= Leinster Senior League (rugby union) =

The Leinster Senior League, inaugurated in 1971–72, is a rugby union competition for senior clubs in the Irish province of Leinster. It has traditionally been ranked second in importance to the Leinster Senior Cup. It declined in importance due to the formation of the All-Ireland League and growth in importance of the Heineken Cup and was eventually merged with the Senior Cup, sometime before 2006, before being revived in 2016.

== Format ==
From 2023, the competition was restricted to teams in the second division of the All-Ireland League, with the Senior Cup being for teams in the First Division.

== List of finals ==
- 1971-72 St. Mary's College
- 1972-73 Wanderers beat Bective Rangers
- 1973-74 Lansdowne beat Wanderers
- 1974-75 Blackrock College beat Bective Rangers
- 1975-76 Wanderers beat Blackrock College
- 1976-77 Landsdowne beat Wanderers
- 1977-78 St. Mary's College beat Old Wesley
- 1978-79 Wanderers beat Terenure College
- 1979-80 St. Mary's College beat Greystones RFC
- 1980-81 Landsdowne beat Wanderers
- 1981-82 Blackrock College beat Wanderers
- 1982-83 Blackrock College beat Terenure College
- 1983-84 Terenure College beat St. Mary's College
- 1984-85 Wanderers beat Landsdowne
- 1985-86 Landsdowne beat Terenure College
- 1986-87 Landsdowne beat Dublin University FC
- 1987-88 Landsdowne beat St. Mary's College
- 1988-89 St. Mary's College beat Old Wesley
- 1999-90 Wanderers beat Terenure College
- 1990-91 Blackrock College beat Clontarf
- 1991-92 Clontarf beat Old Belvedere
- 1992-93 Old Belvedere
- 1993–94
- 1994–95
- 1995-96 Terenure College beat Landsdowne
- 1996–97
- 1997-98 Landsdowne beat Terenure College
- 1998-99 Terenure College
- 1999–2000
- 2000-01 Terenure College
- 2001-02 Landsdowne
- 2002–03
- 2003–04
- 2004–05
- c.2005-16 no competition (merged with Leinster Senior Cup as Leinster Senior League Cup)
- 2016-17 Old Belvedere 19 - 16 Lansdowne
- 2017-18 Lansdowne 9 - 0 Clontarf
- 2018-19 Lansdowne 42 - 5 Terenure College
- 2019-20 Terenure College 24 - 0 Old Wesley
- 2020-21 not played
- 2021-22 Lansdowne 34 - 13 Clontarf
- 2022-23 Terenure College 17 - 15 Lansdowne
- 2023–24
- 2024-25 Naas 31 - 28 Blackrock College
- 2025-26 MU Barnhall 39 - 28 Greystones
- 2026-27 Blackrock College 54 - 26 Nass

== See also ==
- Connacht Senior League
- Munster Senior League
- Ulster Senior League
