= Old Belvedere R.F.C. =

Irish rugby union club, based in Dublin

Old Belvedere
- Full name: Old Belvedere Rugby Football Club
- Union: (Ireland) IRFU
- Branch: Leinster
- Nickname(s): Belvo; The Lodge
- Founded: c. 1918–19
- Region: Dublin
- Ground(s): Ollie Campbell Park; Ballsbridge; Dublin 4 (Capacity: 1,000)
- Chairman: James McCarthy
- President: Paul Dowling
- Coach: Quenton O’Neale
- Captain: Calum Dowling
- League: A.I.L. Div. 1a
- 2024–25: 1st (Promoted)
Team kit

Official website
- oldbelvedere.ie

Old Belvedere R.F.C. is a senior Irish rugby union club based on Anglesea Road in Ballsbridge, Dublin, Ireland. Old Belvedere was originally founded in 1918–19 by former pupils of Belvedere College. Old Belvedere enters senior men's teams in the All-Ireland League, the Leinster Senior League and the Leinster Senior Cup. In 2010–11 they were All-Ireland League champions. Between 1940 and 1946 the club won the Leinster Senior Cup seven times in a row. This remains a competition record. Old Belvedere also enters men's and women's teams in various senior, junior and youth leagues.

== History ==
=== Early years ===
Old Belvedere Rugby Football Club was originally established in 1918–19 following a meeting at Belvedere College. The club initially played in the Dublin League. At the final meeting during their debut season, it was decided to enter senior rugby union and open the club to other Jesuit college students and "to outsiders, who may wish to join us." Their first senior match was against a now defunct club, Merrion. On Saint Patrick's Day 1920, Old Belvedere played their first Leinster Senior Cup game which they lost 0–3 to Wanderers. Kevin Barry played for the Old Belvedere seconds during the 1920–21 season but his arrest and execution, along with the internment of other players, during Irish War of Independence era contributed to the demise of the original club before the start of the 1922–23 season.

=== Reformed ===
Old Belvedere reformed as a junior club in April 1930. This time membership was restricted to former pupils of Belvedere College. The team reached the final of the Leinster Junior League in their first season following their return, losing 11–3 to Bective Rangers. Six future club presidents - George J. Morgan, Eddie Gleeson, Tommy Whelan, Paddy Kevans, John Cummins and Bob O'Connell - all played in this final. The club won their first trophy, the Metropolitan Cup, in 1936 and retained it in 1937. These results encouraged the club to apply for senior status which was gained in time for the 1937–38 season.

=== Seven in a row ===
Old Belvedere recorded their first win in the Leinster Senior Cup in 1940 when they defeated Blackrock College 11–6 after receiving a bye into the second round. Old Belvedere subsequently won the Leinster Senior Cup seven times in a row between 1940 and 1946. Their unbeaten run in the cup came to an end on 26 April 1947 when they lost the 1947 final to Wanderers. Another highlight from this era saw an Old Belvedere XV defeat a visiting New Zealand Services XV 12–6 in December 1946. Old Belvedere was the first Irish side to play a touring side after the Second World War, beating Racing Club de France 6–0 in Lansdowne Road. Several prestigious wins were recorded in the 1950s against Cardiff, Bristol, Wasps, Northampton and Leicester.

=== New Zealand connection ===
The 1970s and 1980s were a lean period for the first team. Old Belvedere decided to become an open club again in 1976. Tom McGurk and the former St Mary's centre, Gary O'Hagan, became the first two non–Belvederian players to play for Old Belvedere since the club's earliest days. In 1990 Ollie Campbell contacted Dr. Oliver Bourke, a friend who had emigrated to New Zealand, about the possibility of sending Old Belvedere youth players to Timaru for the summer. The ad hoc arrangement saw several players, including Peter McKenna, playing in New Zealand. The New Zealand connection also saw Steve McDowall and Bruce Deans coach and play with Old Belvedere. In 1998 Old Belvedere established a more formal arrangement with the Canterbury Rugby Football Union.

=== All Ireland League era ===
Old Belvedere won the Leinster Senior League title in 1992–93, gaining promotion to the All-Ireland League Division 2. This team was coached by Donal Spring and featured Bruce Deans. In 2006–07, with a team captained by Scott Hutton and featuring Andrew Dunne, Old Belvedere won their eleventh Leinster Senior Cup after a lapse of thirty nine years. Old Belvedere won the 2010–11 All-Ireland League title after defeating Cork Constitution 20–17 in the final at Donnybrook Stadium on 1 May 2011. In 2016–17 Old Belvedere won the Leinster Senior League title for a second time. They also finished as runners up in both the Leinster Senior Cup and the All-Ireland Cup.

== Women's team ==
In the 1990s Old Belvedere introduced a women's team. Old Belvedere fields two women's rugby union teams, one in the All-Ireland League Division 1 and another in the Leinster Division 1. Between 2013 and 2015 Old Belvedere won three consecutive All Ireland Division One titles. In 2015–16 and 2017–18 they also finished as runners up.

== Grounds ==
Old Belvedere played their first match, during the 1918–19 season, against Old St Mary's at Beech Hill, Donnybrook. Old Belvedere and Old St Mary's shared this ground. Old Belvedere won the match 6–0. The original Old Belvedere team continued to play at Beech Hill before briefly relocating to Vernon Avenue. When the club was relaunched in 1930, a new ground was leased in Ballymun. The ground lease on Anglesea Road was acquired in 1944 but the first match was not played there until February 1949 due to the amount of work required to level and drain the pitches. In June 1949, the old stand from Croke Park was acquired from the GAA in exchange for a strip of land required to build the Cusack Stand, Belvedere College owned the land beside Croke Park. Floodlights were installed in 1972. The stand was destroyed in a fire in 1993. The concrete terrace that exists today dates from 1958. The present pavilion was opened in 1962 and the old bar and ballroom were replaced in 1995 after the 1993 fire.

== Notable players ==
(British & Irish Lions) British and Irish Lions

- Ollie Campbell; 1980, 1983
- George J. Morgan; 1938
- Karl Mullen; 1950
- Tony O'Reilly; 1955, 1959
- Jack Conan; 2021

Ireland internationals

- Ollie Campbell
- Jack Conan
- Louis Crowe
- Michael Dargan
- Ray Finn
- Neil Francis
- Fergus McFadden
- Derek McGrath
- Peter McKenna
- George J. Morgan
- Karl Mullen
- Rory O'Loughlin
- Des O'Brien
- Tony O'Reilly
- Brendan Quinn
- Frank Quinn
- Kevin Quinn

Ireland sevens internationals

- Andrew Dunne
- Rory O'Loughlin

Ireland women internationals

- Ailis Egan
- Sharon Lynch
- Alison Miller
- Jenny Murphy
- Sene Naoupu
- Yvonne Nolan
- Claire McLaughlin
- Fiona O'Brien
- Marie Louise Reilly
- Sophie Spence
- Nora Stapleton
- Hannah Tyrrell
- Megan Williams

Ireland women sevens internationals

- Sene Naoupu
- Sophie Spence
- Hannah Tyrrell
- Erin King

New Zealand internationals

- Bruce Deans
- Steve McDowall

Others

- Kevin Barry – Irish Volunteer executed during Irish War of Independence
- Tom McGurk – television and radio presenter

== Coaches ==
Years	
1990s	Donal Spring
c. 1996	Bruce Deans
c. 2007	Mike O'Donovan
2013–17	Paul Cunningham
2017–	Eddie O'Sullivan

== Honours ==
Senior Men's

- All-Ireland League
  - Winners: 2010–11: 1
- All-Ireland Cup
  - Runners Up: 2016–17: 1
- Leinster Senior League
  - Winners: 1992–93, 2016–17: 2
  - Runners Up: 1991–92: 1
- Leinster Senior Cup
  - Winners: 1939–40, 1940–41, 1941–42, 1942–43, 1943–44, 1944–45, 1945–46, 1950–51, 1951–52, 1967–68, 2006–07, 2011-12: 12
  - Runners Up: 1946–47, 1948–49, 1954–55, 1999–2000, 2009–10, 2015–16, 2016–17: 7

Senior Women's

- All Ireland Division One
  - Winners: 2013, 2014, 2015 : 3
  - Runners Up: 2015–16, 2017–18 : 2
