= The Colours Match =

Annual rugby union fixture

The Colours Match - Cluiche na nDathanna
Sport	Rugby Union Football
Inaugural Match	13 December 1952
Teams Involved	University College Dublin; Dublin University
Inaugural Winner	University College Dublin
Current Holder	University College Dublin
Captain	Daniel Barron
Current Edition	72nd
Most Recent Match	12 February 2026
Venue	College Park, Trinity College
Trophy	The Colours Cup
Series	University College Dublin: 42; Dublin University: 26; Drawn: 4
Largest winning Margin	UCD 50–20 DU (6 March 2008)
Longest Winning Sequence	UCD (10) [1997/98—2005/06]
Most Captaincies	Shane Moore, UCD (3) [1999/00—2001/02]
Most Matches Played	Brian Cawley, UCD (11) [2008/09—2018/2019] Bill Mulcahy, UCD (8) [1953/54—1960/61]
Next Meeting	2025

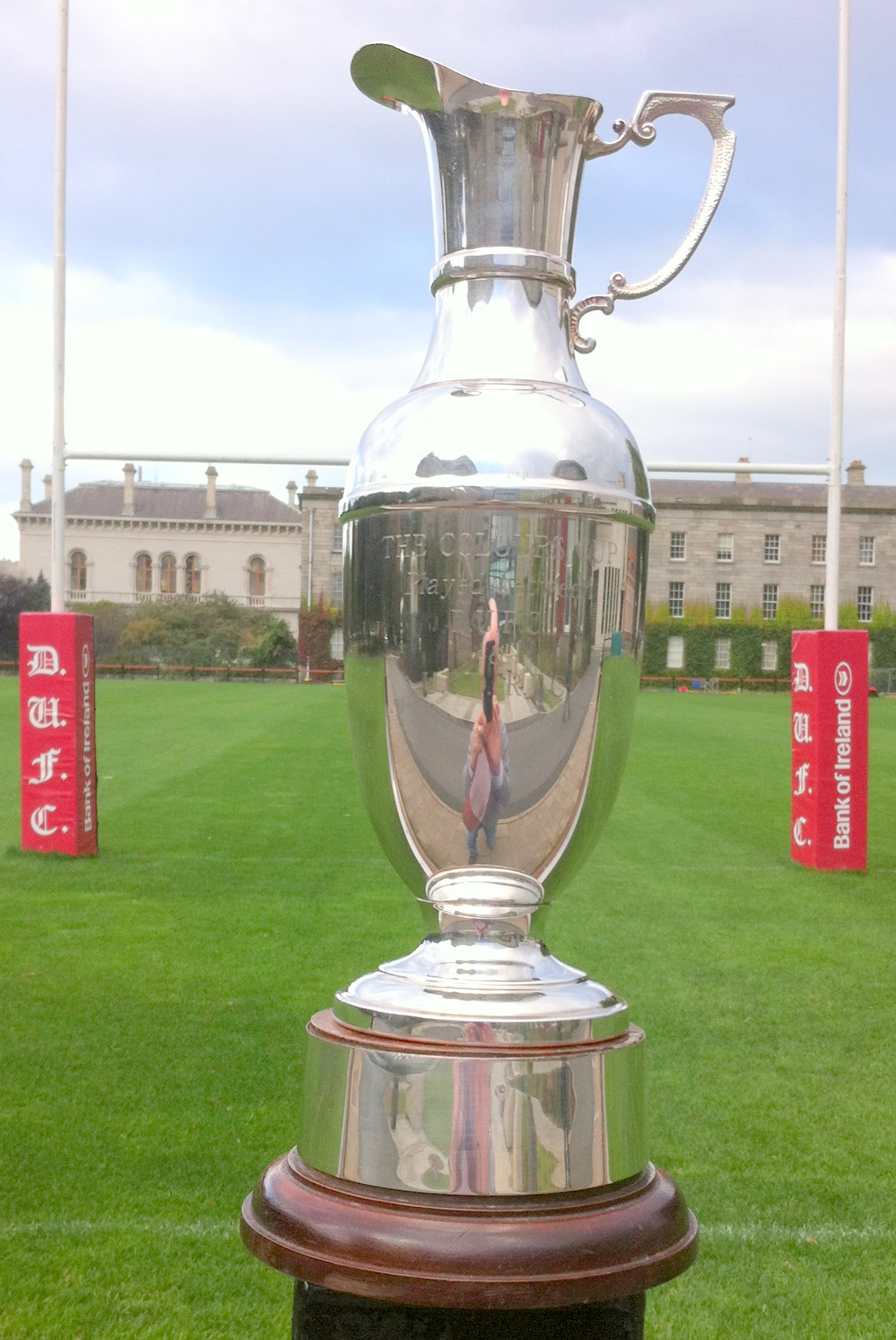
The Colours Cup

The Colours Match (Irish: Cluiche na nDathanna) is an annual rugby union fixture between Trinity College Dublin (Dublin University Football Club) and University College Dublin (University College Dublin R.F.C.) played since 1952. Rugby matches between UCD RFC and DUFC predate the inauguration of "The Colours Match", going back to 1919.

== Background ==
Between 1919 and 1952 "friendly" matches took place annually between the clubs on a home and away basis. Their first meeting took place at Terenure on 18 October 1919, won by Trinity. There were also memorable encounters between UCD and TCD in the Leinster Senior Cup when the draw brought the sides together.

Following the Senior Cup win of UCD over DUFC in 1948 by a dropped goal to nil, the idea of a Colours match was discussed between Harry Thrift of Trinity and Sarsfield Hogan of UCD, who had served together on the International Rugby Board, on which basis each University club would award Colours for the season. Lengthy negotiations ensued and with the cooperation of the IRFU committee and of the Lansdowne and Wanderers RFCs a scheme for an annual Colours match was finally agreed.

The two Universities would play once a year in December. Each University would act as the host in turn and be responsible for the management of the match and for the entertainment. The host University, after consultation with the other side, would invite the referee for the match. A formal teams' dinner would be held after the match.

It was envisaged that the match would be played on a Saturday. Increasing numbers of representative matches and the limited number of Saturdays on which Lansdowne Road was available led to pressure to change the match from Saturdays to a mid-week date.

== History ==
The Colours Match was inaugurated on 13 December 1952 at Lansdowne Road with the first title taken by UCD Trinity gained their first win in 1954 and the first drawn match came in 1955. The first 26 matches and the 35th to 38th matches were held at Lansdowne Road stadium in Dublin. The 27th to 33rd fixtures and the 39th through 60th matches were played at Donnybrook Rugby Ground, the traditional home of the Leinster rugby union team. The 61st 63rd, 65th and 67th encounters took place at the UCD Bowl, Belfield, the 62nd match at Donnybrook Rugby Ground and the 64th, 66th and 68th editions in College Park Rugby Ground, Trinity College.

== Trophy ==
A trophy, The Colours Cup, presented to the winner of the annual Colours Match, was inaugurated in 2002 to mark the Golden Jubilee of the first Colours Match in December 1962. It was first presented to the winners of the 51st Colours Match, UCD, in November 2002. The cup is in the form of a claret jug.

University College are the current holders beating Trinity College by 19 points to 13 points on 12 February 2026 at College Park, Trinity College Dublin.

== Other editions ==
Colours Matches are also played between Trinity and UCD in women's rugby union and other sports, such as association football, Gaelic football, hurling, swimming, boxing, water polo, field hockey, golf, sailing, tennis, and fencing.

== Famous participants ==
- Dick Spring Politician Trinity College
- Peter Sutherland Chairman BP University College
- Brian O'Driscoll Ireland Captain University College
- Jamie Heaslip Ireland Captain Trinity College
- Paddy Johns Ireland Captain Trinity College

== Results ==
=== 1950s ===
Edition	Academic Year	Win	Score	Captain	Loss	Score	Captain	Venue	Date	Comment
1	1952/53	University College Dublin	13	Tim O'Toole	Dublin University	6	Robin Roe*	Lansdowne Road	Sat 13 December 1952	
2	1953/54	University College Dublin	14	Alec Spain	Dublin University	12	Bill Tector	Lansdowne Road	Sat 5 December 1953	
3	1954/55	Dublin University	11	Jim Clinch	University College Dublin	6	Harry Crowe	Lansdowne Road	Sat 4 December 1954	
4	1955/56	University College Dublin	6	Billy O'Gorman	Dublin University	6	Paddy Moss*	Lansdowne Road	Sat 3 December 1955	Match drawn
5	1956/57	University College Dublin	11	Bill Mulcahy	Dublin University	3	Graham Taylor	Lansdowne Road	Sat 1 December 1956	
6	1957/58	University College Dublin	3	Niall Brophy	Dublin University	0	Peter Dowse*	Lansdowne Road	Sat 7 December 1957	
7	1958/59	Dublin University	6	Tony Reid-Smith	University College Dublin	0	Brian Wain	Lansdowne Road	Sat 6 December 1958	
8	1959/60	Dublin University	6	Tony Reid-Smith	University College Dublin	3	Henry Wall	Lansdowne Road	Sat 5 December 1959	

- Acting Captain

=== 1960s ===
Edition	Academic Year	Win	Score	Captain	Loss	Score	Captain	Venue	Date
9	1960/61	University College Dublin	10	Henry Wall	Dublin University	3	Ian Hill	Lansdowne Road	Sat 3 December 1960
10	1961/62	University College Dublin	3	Gerry Tormey	Dublin University	0	Caleb Powell	Lansdowne Road	Sat 2 December 1961
11	1962/63	University College Dublin	12	Jimmy Kelly	Dublin University	3	Martin Rees	Lansdowne Road	Sat 24 November 1962
12	1963/64	Dublin University	8	Bob Read	University College Dublin	3	Aidan Brady*	Lansdowne Road	Sat 14 December 1963
13	1964/65	University College Dublin	11	Aidan Brady	Dublin University	3	Aubrey Bourke	Lansdowne Road	Sat 28 November 1964
14	1965/66	University College Dublin	13	John Murray	Dublin University	0	Dave Buchanan*	Lansdowne Road	Sat 27 November 1965
15	1966/67	University College Dublin	6	Al Moroney	Dublin University	0	Dave Buchanan	Lansdowne Road	Wed 30 November 1966
16	1967/68	Dublin University	12	Gerry Murphy	University College Dublin	11	John O'Hagan	Lansdowne Road	Wed 29 November 1967
17	1968/69	Dublin University	8	Gerry Murphy	University College Dublin	6	Peter Sutherland	Lansdowne Road	Wed 4 December 1968
18	1969/70	University College Dublin	6	Derek Scally	Dublin University	3	Chris Hawkesworth*	Lansdowne Road	Wed 3 December 1969

- Acting Captain

=== 1970s ===
Edition	Academic Year	Win	Score	Captain	Loss	Score	Captain	Venue	Date
19	1970/71	University College Dublin	3	Shay Deering	Dublin University	0	Horace McKinley	Lansdowne Road	Wed 2 December 1970
20	1971/72	University College Dublin	10	Tom Grace	Dublin University	3	Ben Underwood	Lansdowne Road	Wed 1 December 1971
21	1972/73	University College Dublin	19	Conor Sparks	Dublin University	6	Ben Underwood	Lansdowne Road	Wed 6 December 1972
22	1973/74	Dublin University	18	Richard "Dick" Spring	University College Dublin	6	Mick Sherry	Lansdowne Road	Wed 5 December 1973
23	1974/75	University College Dublin	30	Paddy Gahan	Dublin University	12	John Boyd	Lansdowne Road	Wed 4 December 1974
24	1975/76	Dublin University	18	John Robbie	University College Dublin	3	Jimmy Burns	Lansdowne Road	Wed 26 November 1975
25	1976/77	University College Dublin	15	Stephen Hall*	Dublin University	7	Mick Gibson	Lansdowne Road	1 December 1976
26	1977/78	Dublin University	21	Willy Ryan	University College Dublin	12	Stephen Hall	Lansdowne Road	30 November 1977
27	1978/79	Dublin University	12	Donal Spring	University College Dublin	9	Garry Coakley	Donnybrook	6 December 1978
28	1979/80	Dublin University	10	Donal Spring	University College Dublin	0	Sammy Lyons	Donnybrook	28 November 1979

- Acting Captain

=== 1980s ===
Edition	Academic Year	Win	Score	Captain	Loss	Score	Captain	Venue	Date	Comment
29	1980/81	Dublin University	9	Hugo MacNeill	Dublin University	3	Barry O'Brien	Donnybrook	Wed 26 November 1980	
30	1981/82	University College Dublin	12	John Duffy*	Dublin University	12	Greg Dilger	Donnybrook	Wed 2 December 1981	Match drawn
31	1982/83	University College Dublin	8	Derek McGrath	Dublin University	6	Killian Egan*	Donnybrook	Wed 1 December 1982	
32	1983/44	University College Dublin	12	Willie Burns	Dublin University	9	Paul Clinch	Donnybrook	Wed 7 December 1983	
33	1984/85	Dublin University	17	Paul Clinch	University College Dublin	9	Willie Burns*	Donnybrook	Wed 5 December 1984	
34	1985/86	University College Dublin	16	Bobby Byrne	Dublin University	3	Garry McMahon	Donnybrook	Wed 4 December 1985	
35	1986/87	Dublin University	12	Michael Fitzgibbon*	University College Dublin	9	John Mulhall*	Lansdowne Road	Wed 3 December 1986	
36	1987/88	University College Dublin	15	David Madigan	Dublin University	9	Michael Fitzgibbon	Lansdowne Road	Wed 2 December 1987	
37	1988/89	Dublin University	10	Donal Sheehan	University College Dublin	6	Ray Power	Lansdowne Road	Wed 7 December 1988	
38	1989/90	Dublin University	6	Paddy Kenny	University College Dublin	6	Finbar Griffin	Donnybrook	Wed 6 December 1989	Match drawn

- Acting Captain

=== 1990s ===
Edition	Academic Year	Win	Score	Captain	Loss	Score	Captain	Venue	Date
39	1990/91	Dublin University	24	Ian Morgan	University College Dublin	10	Dara O'Flaherty	Donnybrook	Sun 25 November 1990
40	1991/92	University College Dublin	21	Kevin Hogan	Dublin University	15	Phil Barlow	Donnybrook	Sun 1 December 1991
41	1992/93	University College Dublin	19	Andrew Donovan	Dublin University	12	Steve Tracey	Donnybrook	Sun 13 December 1992
42	1993/94	University College Dublin	11	Andrew Donovan	Dublin University	7	Paddy Spicer	Donnybrook	Sun 12 December 1993
43	1994/95	Dublin University	17	Neil Ryan	University College Dublin	12	Greg McConkey	Donnybrook	Sun 18 December 1994
44	1995/96	Dublin University	19	Ray McIlreavy	University College Dublin	13	John Ryan	Donnybrook	Wed 13 December 1995
45	1996/97	University College Dublin	21	Denis Finn	Dublin University	19	Willy Robb	Donnybrook	Fri 29 November 1996
46	1997/98	University College Dublin	36	Gordon Cantwell	Dublin University	21	John Doddy	Donnybrook	Fri 27 March 1998
47	1998/99	University College Dublin	37	Gordon Cantwell	Dublin University	21	Brian Buckley	Donnybrook	Wed 10 February 1999
48	1999/00	University College Dublin	29	Shane Moore	Dublin University	11	Colm Curneen	Donnybrook	Tues 16 November 1999

=== 2000s ===
Edition	Academic Year	Win	Score	Captain	Loss	Score	Captain	Venue	Date	Comment
49	2000/01	University College Dublin	26	Shane Moore	Dublin University	3	Colm Curneen	Donnybrook	Wed 24 January 2001	
50	2001/02	University College Dublin	17	Shane Moore	Dublin University	13	Donal Crotty	Donnybrook	Tues 20 November 2001	
51	2002/03	University College Dublin	12	David Blaney	Dublin University	6	Donal Crotty	Donnybrook	Fri 8 November 2002	
52	2003/04	University College Dublin	25	Dermot Blaney	Dublin University	18	Martin Garvey	Donnybrook	Wed 17 December 2003	
53	2004/05	University College Dublin	20	Philip Bredin	Dublin University	20	Martin Garvey	Donnybrook	Fri 19 November 2004	Match drawn
54	2005/06	University College Dublin	25	Kevin Croke	Dublin University	13	Matt Crockett	Donnybrook	Fri 11 November 2005	
55	2006/07	Dublin University	16	Brian Hastings	University College Dublin	13	Conor Geoghegan	Donnybrook	Fri 17 November 2006	
56	2007/08	University College Dublin	50	Michael Hastings	Dublin University	20	John Doddy	Donnybrook	Thurs 6 March 2008	Largest winning margin
57	2008/09	Dublin University	20	Shane Young	University College Dublin	18	Michael Hastings	Donnybrook	Fri 14 November 2008	
58	2009/10	University College Dublin	28	Matt Nagle	Dublin University	8	Johnny Iliff	Donnybrook	Tues 4 March 2010	

=== 2010s ===
Edition	Academic Year	Win	Score	Captain	Loss	Score	Captain	Venue	Date
59	2010/11	Dublin University	31	Scott LaValla	University College Dublin	22	Andrew Cummiskey	Donnybrook	Sat 16 April 2011
60	2011/12	University College Dublin	31	Andrew Cummiskey	Dublin University	9	David Joyce	Donnybrook	Fri 18 November 2011
61	2012/13	University College Dublin	17	Risteard Byrne	Dublin University	10	Michael McLoughlin	Belfield Bowl	Fri 22 February 2013
62	2013/14	University College Dublin	16	Shane Grannell	Dublin University	12	Jack Kelly	Donnybrook	Fri 7 March 2014
63	2014/15	University College Dublin	32	Emmet McMahon	Dublin University	29	Patrick Lavelle	Belfield Bowl	Thurs 16 April 2015
64	2015/16	Dublin University	28	Nicholas McCarthy	University College Dublin	15	Steve Murphy	College Park, Trinity College	Thurs 23 March 2016
65	2016/17	University College Dublin	32	Jamie Glynn	Dublin University	19	Brian Slater	UCD Bowl, Belfield	Fri 7 April 2017
66	2017/18	Dublin University	11	Michael Courtney	University College Dublin	10	Jamie Glynn	College Park, Trinity College	Thurs 5 April 2018
67	2018/19	Dublin University	18	Colm Hogan	University College Dublin	12	Alex Penny	UCD Bowl, Belfield	Thurs 4 April 2019
—N/a	2019/20	Dublin University	—N/a	James Hickey	University College Dublin	—N/a	Jonny Guy	Cancelled, COVID-19 Pandemic	Thurs 26 March 2020

=== 2020s ===
Edition	Academic Year	Win	Score	Captain	Loss	Score	Captain	Venue	Date
—N/a	2020/21	Dublin University	—N/a	Max Kearney	University College Dublin	—N/a	Ronan Foley	Cancelled, COVID-19 Pandemic	Sat 16 January 2021
68	2021/22	Dublin University	34	Mick O'Kennedy	University College Dublin	27	Jack Ringrose	College Park, Trinity College	Fri 1 April 2022
69	2022/23	University College Dublin	21	Bobby Sheehan	Dublin University	19	Louis O'Reilly	UCD Bowl, Belfield	Fri 31 March 2023
70	2023/24	Dublin University	22	Diarmuid McCormack	University College Dublin	13	Bobby Sheehan	College Park, Trinity College	Sat 30 March 2024
71	2024/25	University College Dublin	37	Bobby Sheehan	Dublin University	36	James Hickey	UCD Bowl, Belfield	Thu 13 March 2025
72	2025/26	University College Dublin	19	Daniel Barron	Dublin University	13	David Walsh	College Park, Trinity College	Thu 12 February 2026

=== By total wins ===
University	Titles
University College Dublin	42
Trinity College Dublin	26
Drawn	4

== See also ==
- List of British and Irish varsity matches
