= Aidan Brady (rugby union) =

Irish rugby union player

- Full name: Aidan Malachy Brady
- Born: 16 October 1939 Dublin, Ireland
- Died: 16 April 2019 (aged 79) Dublin, Ireland

Rugby union career
- Position: Hooker
International career
Years	Team	Apps	(Points)
1966–68	Ireland	4	(0)

Aidan Malachy Brady (16 October 1939 — 16 April 2019) was an Irish rugby union international.

Brady, born in Dublin, was educated at Blackrock College and went on to study at UCD School of Medicine. He featured in two Leinster Senior Cup successes with UCD and captained the club to a win over Trinity in the 1964/65 Colours Match.

A hooker, Brady gained four Ireland caps during his career. His first selection, via UCD, came against Scotland at Lansdowne Road in the 1966 Five Nations Championship. Two years later, while playing in Northern Ireland for Malone, he made a further three Five Nations appearances, including wins over Scotland and Wales.

Brady practiced medicine in Chatham, Ontario, Canada.

== See also ==
- List of Ireland national rugby union players
