= Eugene Davy =

Eugene O'Donnell Davy (26 July 1904 – 11 November 1996) was an Ireland international rugby union fly-half.

Davy was born into an affluent family in County Dublin on 26 July 1904. He was one of nine surviving children of Thomas Davy, a merchant, and his wife Alice. According to 1911 Irish census, both Davy's parents were originally from County Tipperary and his family were living at 29 Terenure Road East, Rathgar. He attended Belvedere College where he was a contemporary of Kevin Barry. He attended University College Dublin and captained the university rugby team in the 1925–26 season.

Davy's club side was Lansdowne Football Club. The club won the Leinster Senior Cup five consecutive times from 1927 to 1931 and the Bateman Cup (the all-Ireland championship) on three occasions between 1928–29 and 1930–31.

He won 34 international caps for Ireland between 1925 and 1934. His debut was on 14 March 1925 against Wales. He played his final international against England on 10 February 1934. In his international career he scored eight tries and three drop goals and was part of the Irish team that shared the 1926 Five Nations Championship. In 1930 he made history by scoring three tries in eight minutes in a 14–11 win over Scotland at Murrayfield. As of January 2009, he is among the top twenty try-scorers in Irish rugby history.

He was manager of Ireland on their victorious 1967 tour of Australia. He also served as president of the IRFU in 1967–68.

In 1926 Davy and his brother James founded Davy Stockbrokers, now one of Ireland's leading providers of financial services.

He died on 11 November 1996, aged 92.

In 1999 UCD inaugurated the 'Davy Bursary' in his honour. He was one of thirty-two former Belvedere pupils profiled in Oliver Murphy's book Belvedere’s Rugby Heroes (2006).
