= Jammie Clinch =

Irish rugby union player

- Full name: James Daniel Clinch
- Born: 28 September 1901 Clondalkin, Dublin, Ireland
- Died: 1 May 1981 (aged 79) Dublin, Ireland
- Notable relative(s): Andrew Clinch (father); Paul Clinch (grandson)

Rugby union career
- Position: Flanker
International career
Years	Team	Apps	(Points)
1923–31	Ireland	30	(0)

James Daniel Clinch (28 September 1901 – 1 May 1981) was an Irish medical practitioner and rugby union international who was capped in 30 Test matches for Ireland from 1923 to 1931.

== Early life ==
Born in Clondalkin, Clinch was the son of the Ireland and British Lions forward Andrew Clinch. He attended both Catholic University School and St Andrew's College.

== Rugby career ==
Clich represented Leinster in provincial rugby and won Leinster Senior Cup titles with Dublin University in 1920 and 1921.

A flanker, Clinch took part in the 1924 British Lions tour to South Africa, but didn't feature in any of the Test matches. This did still give him and Andrew the distinction of being the first father and son duo to have been on a Lions tour. His 30 caps for Ireland equalled George Hamlet's record for the most by an Ireland forward and remained a record until passed by Ronnie Kavanagh in 1961.

== Medicine ==
Clinch initially studied medicine at Trinity College Dublin during his playing career. He never graduated despite seven years of study and worked for a while as an insurance salesman, as well as serving a stint in the British Army.

In 1934, Clinch resumed his medical studies at the Royal College of Surgeons and after graduating moved to Wales, where he worked as a general practitioner.

== Personal life ==
Clinch was married with six children. His grandson is noted academic and economist Peter Clinch.

== See also ==
- List of Ireland national rugby union players
