= Dublin University Football Club =

Irish rugby union club, based in Trinity College Dublin

Dublin University
- Full name: Dublin University Football Club
- Union: (Ireland) IRFU
- Branch: Leinster
- Nickname: Trinity Rugby
- Founded: 1854; 172 years ago
- Region: Dublin
- Ground: College Park, Dublin (Capacity: 500)
- Chairman: John Coulter
- President: Greg Duffy
- Coach(es): Tony Smeeth, Hugh Maguire
- Captain: David Walsh
- League: All-Ireland Div. 1B
- 2025–26
1st kit	2nd kit

Official website
- www.dufc.ie

Dublin University Football Club (DUFC) is the rugby union club of Trinity College, in Dublin, Ireland, which plays in Division 1B of the All-Ireland League.

== History ==
Dublin University is the oldest rugby club in Ireland, and the world's oldest extant football club of any code, formed in 1854 by students returning to the country after education at Cheltenham College and Rugby School. Early rule variants of modern football and rugby union were being codified at these public schools, and were subsequently key to the later development of the laws of Rugby union in 1870. making the club older than the sport that it plays.

Football in Trinity College pre-dates the foundation of the club and the codification of association football and later rugby football, with a poem by Edward Lysaght showing that it was being played in College Park in the 1780s, when football more closely resembled medieval football and caid.

The first known record of the club appears in the Dublin Daily Express of 1 December 1855:

FOOTBALL. - A match will be played in the College Park today (Saturday) between original and new members of the club. Play to commence at two o'clock College time.

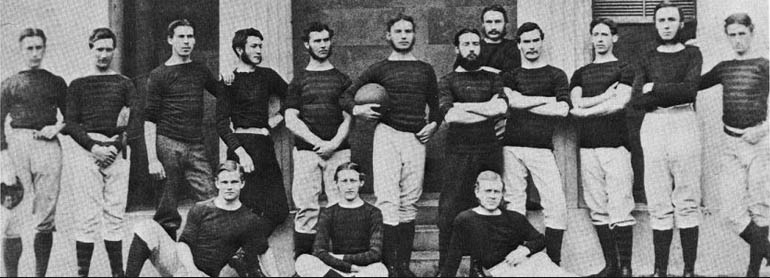
Dublin University team of the 1870s

In 1868, DUFC drew up its own laws for the many intra-club matches it was hosting at that college. In 1874, the club initiated discussions with other Irish clubs that had recently formed to create a selection panel for a representative team to play against an England team. The panel to select this team became the Irish Football Union, a predecessor to the current Irish Rugby Football Union.

The club's most notable achievement in recent years was winning the All-Ireland League second division in the 2003–04 season, which also gained the club promotion to the top tier of Irish club rugby union. This level of competition was short-lived, however, with the club returning to Division 2 after two seasons.. In 2018, the under-20s were All-Ireland champions, beating Clontarf FC to lift the Fraser McMullen Cup. In 2022, the under-20s again won the Fraser McMullen Cup, with a 28–23 win over rivals University College Dublin.

== Present status ==
The DUFC senior team currently plays in Division 1B of the All-Ireland League. The 1st XV plays against University College Dublin in the annual Colours Match Since inception in 1952, Trinity has won on 26 occasions, the latest being the 2024 match.

The club also has a women's team, which has played in AIL division 3.

The club also fields three Junior teams who compete in the Leinster J1, J3 and J4 Metro Leagues, and two under-20 teams who play in the JP Fanagan Premier and Pennant leagues respectively.

In October 2020, the club had three players, Liam Turner, Michael Silvester and Jack Dunne, play in Leinster's Pro14 win over Zebre.

== Grounds ==
The club's main playing field is College Park within the grounds of Trinity in the Dublin city centre. It also has two other football fields used mainly by the Junior teams on Santry Avenue, Santry.

== Notable players ==
=== Ireland ===
Dublin University Football Club has a long tradition of its players gaining the highest international honours, with over 160 past players being capped for Ireland since 1875.

- Thomas St. George McCarthy
- Francis Browning
- Lawrence Bulger
- Andrew Clinch
- Thomas Arnold Harvey
- James Cecil Parke
- Noel Purcell
- Bethel Solomons
- Sir Thomas Ranken Lyle
- Mark Sugden
- Robert Barnes
- Robin Roe
- Philip Orr
- Dick Spring
- Hugo MacNeill
- Des Fitzgerald
- Brendan Mullin
- Paddy Johns
- Niall Woods
- Malcolm O'Kelly
- Trevor Hogan
- Kieran Lewis
- Matt McCullough
- Roger Wilson
- Jamie Heaslip
- Niyi Adeolokun
- Eric O'Sullivan
- Linda Djougang (women's)
- Ryan Baird
- Dan Sheehan
- Joe McCarthy
- Fiona Tuite (women's)
- Thomas Clarkson
- Paddy McCarthy

=== British & Irish Lions ===
DUFC also has a long history of providing British & Irish Lions tourists, with the most recent contribution being Jamie Heaslip in 2013.

- Cecil Boyd: 1896
- Lawrence Bulger: 1896
- Andrew Clinch: 1896
- Arthur Meares: 1896
- Jim Sealy: 1896
- Jas.E. Wallace: 1903
- Jos.E. Wallace: 1903
- Robertson Smyth: 1903
- Jammie Clinch: 1924
- C.V. Boyle: 1938
- Robin Roe: 1955
- M.G. Roberts: 1971
- Philip Orr: 1977, 1980
- John Robbie: 1980
- Hugo MacNeill: 1983
- Des Fitzgerald: 1986 (cancelled)
- Jamie Heaslip: 2009, 2013
- Joe McCarthy: 2025
- Dan Sheehan: 2025
- Thomas Clarkson: 2025

=== Ireland coaches ===
Dublin University past players Roly Meates and Gerry Murphy both went on to coach Ireland at different times. Meates is also an honorary life member of DUFC, having coached the club for 28 years.

- Roly Meates: 1975-77
- Gerry Murphy: 1992-95

=== Internationals ===
- (Sweden) Phillip Murphy

== Honours ==
- All-Ireland Cup (1): 1925-26
- Leinster Senior Cup (19): 1883, 1884, 1886, 1887, 1890, 1893, 1895, 1897, 1898, 1900, 1905, 1907, 1908, 1912, 1920, 1921, 1926, 1960, 1976
