= MU Barnhall RFC =

Irish rugby union club, based in Leixlip, Co.Kildare

MU Barnhall
- Full name: MU Barnhall Rugby Football Club
- Union: (Ireland) IRFU
- Branch: Leinster
- Founded: 1969; 57 years ago
- Location: Leixlip, County Kildare
- Ground: Parsonstown
- Chairman: Noel Dillon
- President: Paul Murphy
- Director of Rugby: Sam Cawley
- Coach: Adrian Flavin
- Captain: Robert Holt
- League: A.I.L. Div. 2A
- 2024–25: 3rd.
Team kit

Official website
- mubarnhall.com

MU Barnhall RFC is an Irish rugby union club.

== History ==
Barnhall Rugby Club was founded on 16 May 1969 by employees of Irish Meat Packers, Barnhall, Parsinstown, Leixlip, County Kildare. The first full season was 1969/70 when Barnhall played in the J5 O’Connor Cup. At the start of the following 1970/71 season, the committee decided to find games for a second team. The rationale for this move was that the club had no chance of progression or even survival unless a second team was put on the field. Since 1999 Barnhall have established themselves as an All-Ireland League team having spent most of their time in Division Two. 2008 brought Relegation to Parsonstown. Having narrowly avoided relegation for a second consecutive year in 2009. In 2010, the club changed its name to NUIM Barnhall, reflecting the club's tie-in with the National University of Ireland, Maynooth; and in 2015 to the current MU Barnhall, reflecting the university's change of style to 'Maynooth University'.

Barnhall play in Division 2A of the All-Ireland League.

Over the years notable players have included Trevor Brennan.

== Honours ==
- All-Ireland League Division 2B
  - Winners: 2018-19: 1
- All-Ireland League Division 2A
  - Winners: 2025-26: 1
- Leinster Senior League Shield
  - Winners: 2013-14: 1
- Leinster Senior League
  - Winners: 2025-26: 1
- Fraser McMullen All Ireland U20
  - Winners: 2025-26: 1

== Youth Development ==
MU Barnhall RFC have a large underage rugby programme. The mini-section in the club has players from under-8's level to under-13's.

The youth teams from under 13's to under 19's follow the IRFU's Long Term Player Development Plan(LTPD) and the emphasis moves from participation and fundamentals to learning to play the game and learning to train for the game. The under 19's team play in the Under-19 Premier League. Barnhall were very successful in the Under 16(now Under 17) competition winning the All Ireland in 2005/2006 and runners up in 2001 and 2006/2007. The 2005/2006 squad also went on to win the All-Ireland competition.

== Women's Rugby ==
In 2007 Barnhall entered the Leinster Women's league for the first time. Managed by Jennie Coleman and coached by Keith Bewley and Kevin Sheil the team went as far as the final in their inaugural year losing out to Longford in the final at Malahide.

The team draws its players mostly from the Tag-rugby leagues which are played every Summer in Parsonstown and from NUI Maynooth whose rugby programme has close links with Barnhall RFC.

In 2010 the Barnhall Women won the Leinster Div 3 to become Leinster champions.

== Representative Rugby ==
Over the years Barnhall has produced players who have gone on to play representative rugby for Leinster, Ireland and even abroad. Trevor Brennan began his career in Parsonstown before going on to play for Bective Rangers in the AIL and then captaining St Mary's College RFC to AIL division 1 success. Trevor was contracted to Leinster when he moved back to Barnhall who had just achieved senior status and were promoted to AIL Division 2. He was capped 13 times for Ireland before moving to French side Toulouse where he appeared in three Heineken Cup finals in a row winning two of them.

Brendan Burke made his AIL debut at the age of 17 and earned a Leinster contract by becoming one of the top try-scorers of all time in the AIL with 49 tries. He played for the Irish under-19's and Irish 7's teams and is currently playing with English Division 1 team Bedford.

Klein Jan Tromp arrived in Barnhall from South Africa in 2001. Klein was quoted in a South African rugby magazine saying that his year in Barnhall re-ignited his passion to play rugby and on his return to South Africa he played both Currie Cup and Super 14 rugby for the Cheetahs and the Cats.
