= Paul Clinch =

Ireland international rugby union player

- Full name: Paul Daniel Clinch
- Born: 25 March 1961 (age 65) Aldershot, England
- School: Belvedere College
- University: Trinity College Dublin
- Notable relative(s): Jammie Clinch (grandfather); Andrew Clinch (great grandfather)

Rugby union career
- Position: Centre
International career
Years	Team	Apps	(Points)
1989	Ireland	2	

Paul Daniel Clinch (born 25 March 1961) is an Irish former international rugby union player.

Clinch, a Belvedere College product, is the grand grandson of 1890s Ireland forward Andrew Clinch and grandson of 30-times capped Ireland flanker Jammie Clinch, both of whom also toured with the British Lions.

A centre, Clinch was a varsity captain at Trinity College, led Lansdowne in the 1988/89 season and captained Leinster against the touring 1989 All Blacks. He won Ireland selection for their uncapped 1988 tour of France and then 1989 tour of North America, where he featured in international matches against Canada and the United States, for which in 2023 he was retrospectively awarded caps.

Clinch coached Lansdowne to a Leinster Senior Cup title in 1997.

== See also ==
- List of Ireland national rugby union players
