= George J. Morgan =

Irish rugby union player

George Morgan
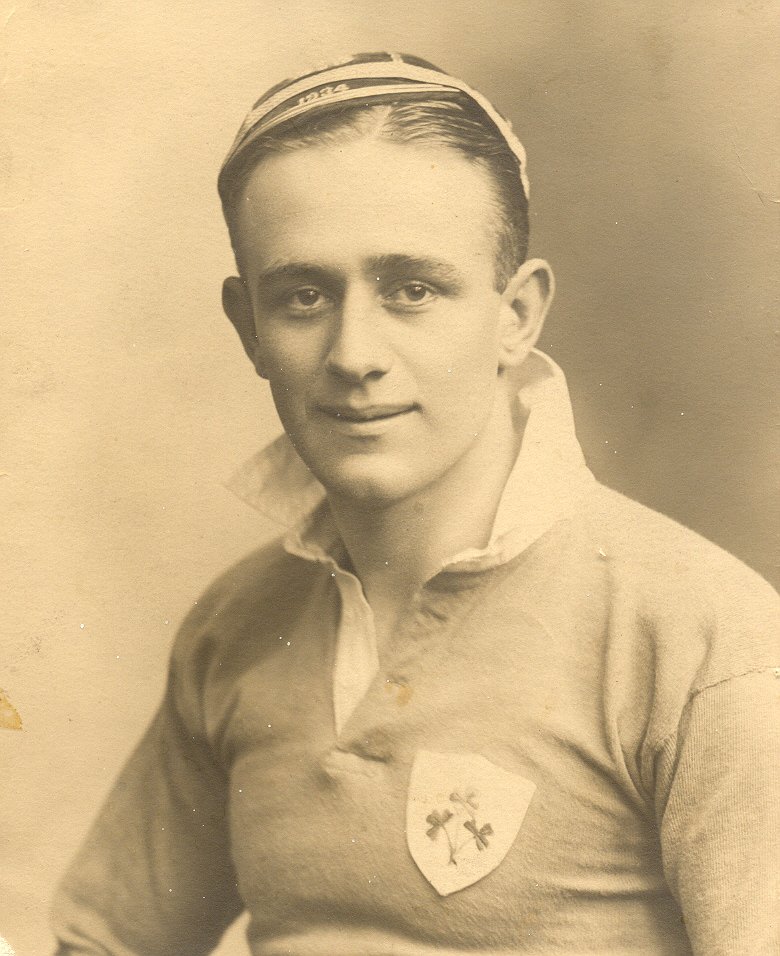
- Born: George Joseph Morgan; 24 March 1912 Dublin
- Died: 18 April 1979 (aged 67) Dublin
- Height: 5 ft 10 in (178 cm)
- School: Belvedere College S.J.
- Occupation: Bank Official

Rugby union career
International career
Years	Team	Apps	(Points)
1934-38	Ireland		
1938	British & Irish Lions		

George Joseph Morgan (24 March 1912 – 18 April 1979), known as George J. Morgan, was an Irish international rugby union player who represented Ireland on 19 occasions and was also a member of the 1938 British Lions tour to South Africa. At club level, he played for both Clontarf RFC and Old Belvedere RFC, as well as playing at inter-provincial level for Leinster Rugby and guest appearances for the Barbarians. He played in the scrum-half position.

== Sporting history ==
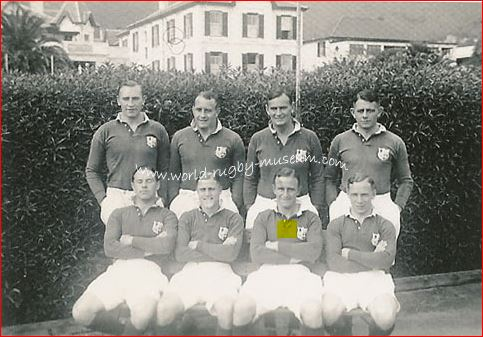
The eight Irishmen selected for the 1938 British Lions tour to South Africa

Morgan was educated at Belvedere College in Dublin. At the age of just 13, he played on the Belvedere College Junior Cup-winning team of 1925. He made his debut for Ireland against England on 10 February 1934 in Lansdowne Road. He scored a try in the first half, although Ireland lost 3-14. This was the first of his 18 consecutive caps in the Four Nations competition. His career was brought to a premature conclusion by the onset of World War II. He gained one additional cap playing against New Zealand on 7 December 1935. Ireland lost 9-17.

He was appointed Irish captain for the 1936-1937 season and retained the honour for the following two seasons (apart from one match against Wales in 1938). In 1938, he was selected as one of eight Irishmen on the 1938 British Lions tour to South Africa. He was not selected for the first two tests against the Springboks but did play in the final test which the Lions won. He was also honoured as Captain of the Lions in their winning match against North East Districts.

At club level, he captained Clontarf RFC to their first-ever Leinster Senior Cup victory in 1936. When his school club Old Belvedere won senior status in 1937, George joined them and captained them to a first Leinster Senior Cup win in 1940. This was to be the first of seven consecutive Leinster Senior Cup wins for the Old Belvedere Club. He played on four occasions for the Barbarians F.C. between 1935 and 1937. As an administrator he was a member of the Irish Selectors from 1944 to 1947.

He is one of few sportsmen to have played both rugby and cricket for Ireland. He played his cricket with Clontarf Cricket Club and won an international cap when selected for 'The Gentlemen of Ireland' XI against the MCC in July 1934.

== Personal life ==
On leaving school, he joined the (then) Royal Bank of Ireland. He worked in Dublin at the Smithfield and O'Connell Street branches of the bank. He was later appointed manager of the Drumcondra Branch of The Royal Bank. His final appointment was as manager of the Talbot Street branch of AIB.

In September 1939, George married Kay Conroy. They had five children and lived on Clontarf Road. He was elected president of the Old Belvedere RFC from 1959 to 1961 and president of the Belvedere College Past Pupils Union in 1963-1964. He was also a trustee and honorary life member of the Old Belvedere Rugby Club.
