= Linda Djougang =

Irish rugby union player

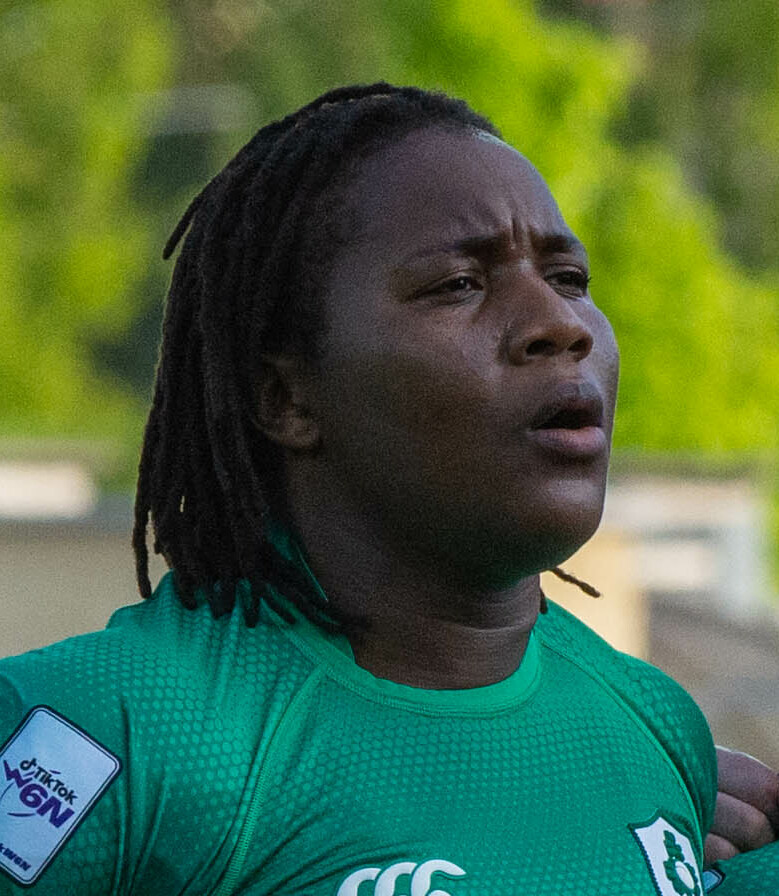
- Djougang with Ireland in 2023
- Born: 17 May 1996 (age 30) Cameroon
- Height: 1.7 m (5 ft 7 in)
- Weight: 82 kg (181 lb)
- University: Trinity College Dublin
- Occupation(s): Rugby player, nurse

Rugby union career
- Position(s): Loosehead Prop, Tighthead Prop
- Current team: Old Belvedere RFC
Senior career
Years	Team	Apps	(Points)
- ASM Romagnat
- Old Belvedere RFC
International career
Years	Team	Apps	(Points)
2019–	Ireland	60	(50)
- Correct as of 17 October 2026

Linda Djougang (born 17 May 1996) is an Irish rugby player and nurse from Rush, Co Dublin. She plays for Old Belvedere, Leinster and Ireland women's national rugby union team. She works fulltime as a nurse in Dublin and is a brand ambassador for Energia Group and ALDI.

== Background ==
Djougang moved to Ireland from Douala in Cameroon at the age of 9. She grew up in Rush, County Dublin where she attended Rush and Lusk Educate Together National School and then attended St. Joseph's Secondary School in Rush. She studied general nursing at Trinity College Dublin from 2015 to 2020. She worked as a part-time care assistant from 2016 to 2020. She also worked as an intern at Grant Thornton International. In 2020, she began working at Tallaght University Hospital. Djougang speaks English and French fluently.

== Rugby career ==
Djougang began playing rugby at the age of 17 when a friend invited her to a game of tag rugby.

It was not until she was in university at Trinity College Dublin, while on a work placement, that she first encountered rugby. She was spotted playing ‘tag rugby’ in Wanderers RFC whose team manager Michelle Byrne invited her to join the club.

A year after starting with Wanderers she got a trial with Leinster. She took a year out of college in 2017 to concentrate on rugby and moved to All Ireland League club Old Belvedere in order to get experience at the top level. In 2018 she made her inter-provincial debut for Leinster, versus Ulster.

She soon began playing for Wanderers Rugby Club before moving to Old Belvedere. She has also played for the Dublin University Football Club.

In December 2019 she scored a try for Leinster against Harlequins in the first women's club game to be played in Twickenham.

In August 2021, the Irish Rugby Football Union announced that Djougang would move from Leinster Rugby to ASM Romagnat. Djougang originally played as a blindside flanker before moving to loosehead prop and then tighthead prop.

She was named in Ireland's XVs side for the 2025 Six Nations Championship in March. On 11 August 2025, she made the Irish squad to the Rugby World Cup.

== Awards ==
- 2021 Energia Women's Rugby Award - nominee
- 2020 Zurich Women's XV Player of the Year - nominee
- 2019 Trinity Sports Person of the Year - winner
