= Leinster Senior League Shield =

The Leinster Senior League Shield was a rugby competition in Ireland, involving lower-ranked senior rugby clubs in Leinster, i.e. clubs from Leinster competing in the lower divisions of the All-Ireland League. It ran from 2011-12 until 2015–16. Previous to this, all senior teams competed together in the Leinster Senior League Cup.

The teams were drawn into two groups, the winners and runners-up of which entered the semi-finals.

== Finals ==
- 2011-12 Old Wesley 25-16 Greystones
- 2012-13 Skerries 7-6 Naas
- 2013-14 MU Barnhall 13-6 Naas
- 2014-15 Wanderers 33-28 Greystones
- 2015-16 Greystones 68-25 Wanderers

== See also ==
- Leinster Senior League Cup
