= Ray Finn =

Ray Finn may refer to:

- Ray Finn (footballer) (1926–2000), Australian rules footballer
- Ray Finn (rugby union) (born 1953), Irish rugby union international
