= Leinster League (disambiguation) =

Leinster League is a rugby union competition.

Leinster League may also refer to:

- Leinster Senior League (rugby union)
- Leinster Senior League (association football)
- Leinster Senior League (cricket)
