= Peter Clinch =

Peter Clinch may refer to:

- Peter Clinch (economist) Irish academic and economist
- Peter Clinch (politician) (1753–1816), Irish-born politician
