= Andrew Clinch =

Ireland international rugby union player

- Born: Andrew Daniel Clinch; 28 November 1867 Dublin, Ireland
- Died: 1 February 1937 (aged 69) Dublin, Ireland
- School: Belvedere College
- University: Trinity College Dublin
- Notable relative(s): Jammie Clinch (son); Paul Clinch (great-grandson); Peter Clinch (great-grandson)

Rugby union career
- Position: Forward
Senior career
Years	Team	Apps	(Points)
- Dublin University
–	Wanderers		
International career
Years	Team	Apps	(Points)
1892-1897	Ireland	10	(0)
1896	British Lions	4	(0)

Andrew Daniel Clinch MD JP (28 November 1867 – 1 February 1937), was an Irish rugby union forward who played club rugby for Dublin University and international rugby for Ireland and the British and Irish Lions.

== Biography ==
Educated at Belvedere College S.J. Andrew Daniel (Coo) Clinch represented Leinster, Ireland and the British and Irish Lions in a distinguished playing career and later became president of the Irish Rugby Football Union. He was a member of the squad on the 1896 British Lions tour to South Africa.

His son, Jammie Clinch, also played rugby for Ireland and the British and Irish Lions.

His grandfather James Clinch was a jeweler and made Claddagh Rings in Galway in the early 1800s

His great-grandson Peter Clinch is an Irish academic and economist, who has served as Chairperson of Science Foundation Ireland.

His great-great-granddaughter Catherine Clinch stars in the Irish language film An Cailín Ciúin
