= Leinster Senior League =

Leinster Senior League may refer to:

- Leinster Senior League (rugby union)
- Leinster Senior League (association football)
- Leinster Senior League (cricket)
