= All-Ireland Cup (rugby union) =

The All-Ireland Cup, also known as the Bateman Cup, is a knock-out competition for the winners of the four provincial rugby union cups in Ireland.

== History ==
The Bateman Cup ran from 1922 to 1939 as a competition for the four provincial cup-winners, but did not continue after the Second World War. The competition was revived in 1975 for the centenary of the Irish Rugby Football Union. In 2006, an All-Ireland Cup was instituted for the top teams in the All-Ireland League, and in 2010 this was changed to the old Bateman Cup format, with only the four provincial cup winners taking part, and the Bateman Cup trophy presented to the winners. The Bateman Cup was originally presented to the IRFU by Dr Godfrey Bateman, a member of a well-known West Cork family, in memory of his sons Reginald and Arthur who were killed during the First World War, who played for Sir Patrick Dun's Hospital in the Dublin Hospitals Rugby Cup.

== Past finals ==
=== 1922–39 (Bateman Cup) ===
Source: IRFU (3 May 2014)

- 1921–22 Lansdowne 6–5 Cork Constitution
- 1922–23 Bective Rangers 6–5 Instonians
- 1923–24 Queen's University 29–11 UCD
- 1924–25 Bective Rangers 6–3 Garryowen
- 1925–26 Dublin University 6–3 Garryowen
- 1926–27 Instonians 16–8 Lansdowne
- 1927–28 Young Munster 6–3 Lansdowne
- 1928–29 Lansdowne 19–12 Galwegians
- 1929–30 Lansdowne 19–12 North of Ireland
- 1930–31 Lansdowne 16–5 Collegians
- 1931–32 Queen's University 19–0 Cork Constitution
- 1932–33 not played
- 1933–34 not played
- 1934–35 North of Ireland 14–0 Bective Rangers
- 1935–36 UCC 17–0 UCG
- 1936–37 Queen's University 8–0 UCC
- 1937–38 UCD 16–6 Young Munster
- 1938–39 Blackrock College 4–3 North of Ireland

=== Centenary tournament ===
- 1974–75 St Mary's College 9–9 Galway Corinthians (St Mary's won on try count)

=== 2006–10 (AIB Cup) ===
- 2005–06 Cork Constitution 37–12 St Mary's College
- 2006–07 Garryowen 20–7 Belfast Harlequins
- 2007–08 Shannon 12–9 Blackrock College
- 2008–09 Ballynahinch 17–6 Cork Constitution
- 2009–10 Cork Constitution 15–11 Garryowen

=== 2010s (Bateman Cup) ===
- 2010–11 Bruff 24–18 Dungannon
- 2011–12 Garryowen 24–6 Ballymena
- 2012–13 Cork Constitution 24–19 St Mary's College
- 2013–14 Cork Constitution 19–6 UCD
- 2014–15 Cork Constitution 24–9 Clontarf
- 2015–16 Cork Constitution 38–19 Galwegians
- 2016–17 Cork Constitution 18–13 Old Belvedere
- 2017–18 Lansdowne 32–12 Cork Constitution
- 2018–19 Garryowen 45–21 City of Armagh

=== 2020s ===
- 2019–20† Lansdowne & Cork Constitution joint winners
- 2020–21† not played
- 2021–22 Lansdowne 46–13 Young Munster
- 2022-23 Terenure College 71-13 Buccaneers
- 2023-24 Terenure College 22-15 Young Munster
- 2024-25 Lansdowne 38-26 Instonians
- 2025-26 Clontarf 21-16 Ballynahinch

† Lansdowne and Cork Constitution were declared joint winners of the 2019–20 competition as it was unfinished due to the COVID-19 pandemic with the 2020–21 competition cancelled completely

== Performance by club ==
| Club | Winners | Runners-up | Winning years |
|---|---|---|---|
| Cork Constitution | 8 | 4 | 2005–06, 2009–10, 2012–13, 2013–14, 2014–15, 2015–16, 2016–17, 2019–20† |
| Lansdowne | 8 | 2 | 1921–22, 1928–29, 1929–30, 1930–31, 2017–18, 2019–20†, 2021–22, 2024–25 |
| Garryowen | 3 | 3 | 2006–07, 2011–12, 2018–19 |
| Queen's University | 3 | - | 1923–24, 1931–32, 1936–37 |
| Bective Rangers | 2 | 1 | 1922–23, 1924–25 |
| Terenure College | 2 | 0 | 2022–23, 2023-24 |
| North of Ireland | 1 | 2 | 1934–35 |
| UCD | 1 | 2 | 1937–38 |
| St Mary's College | 1 | 2 | 1974–75 |
| Instonians | 1 | 2 | 1926-27 |
| Young Munster | 1 | 2 | 1927–28 |
| UCC | 1 | 1 | 1935–36 |
| Blackrock College | 1 | 1 | 1938–39 |
| Ballynahinch | 1 | 1 | 2008–09 |
| Clontarf | 1 | 1 | **2025-26** |
| Bruff | 1 | - | 2010–11 |
| Dublin University | 1 | - | 1925–26 |
| Shannon | 1 | - | 2007–08 |
| Galwegians | - | 2 | - |
| Ballymena | - | 1 | - |
| Belfast Harlequins | - | 1 | - |
| Collegians | - | 1 | - |
| Dungannon | - | 1 | - |
| Galway Corinthians | - | 1 | - |
| UCG | - | 1 | - |

Bold = Current Champions
† Shared title

== See also ==
- Connacht Senior Cup
- Leinster Senior Cup
- Munster Senior Cup
- Ulster Senior Cup
- All-Ireland Junior Cup
