= Frank Quinn (rugby union) =

Irish rugby union player

- Full name: Francis Peter Quinn
- Born: 5 September 1954 (age 72) Dublin, Ireland
- School: Belvedere College

Rugby union career
- Position: Wing
International career
Years	Team	Apps	(Points)
1981	Ireland	3	(0)

Francis Peter Quinn (born 5 September 1954) is an Irish former international rugby union player.

Born in Dublin, Quinn is a nephew of Ireland internationals Seamus and Frankie Byrne. He attended Belvedere College and was half-back partner to Ollie Campbell on their 1972 Leinster Schools Senior Cup-winning side.

Quinn, an Old Belvedere player, was capped three times by Ireland in the 1981 Five Nations, playing as a winger against France, Wales and England. He left Irish rugby at the end of the year to take up a job offer in Johannesburg.

== See also ==
- List of Ireland national rugby union players
