= Tony Ward (rugby union) =

Irish rugby union international

Personal information
- Full name: Anthony Joseph Patrick Ward
- Born: 8 October 1954 (age 72) Dublin

Playing information
- Position: Fly-half
Club
Years	Team	Pld	T	G	FG	P
1975–1982	Garryowen
1982–1984	St. Mary's College RFC
1985–1991	Greystones RFC
	Total	0	0	0	0	0
Representative
Years	Team	Pld	T	G	FG	P
1976–1985	Munster
1986–1988	Leinster
1976–1977	Ireland A	2				6
1978–1987	Ireland	19				113
1980	British and Irish Lions	1				18
19xx–19xx	Barbarians

Anthony Joseph Patrick Ward (born 8 October 1954) is an Irish former rugby union and football player during the 1970s and 1980s. He played rugby as a fly-half for Munster, Leinster, Ireland, the British and Irish Lions, and the Barbarians. Ward was selected 1979 European rugby player of the year. He was born in Leeds before his Irish family moved back to Ireland.

== Playing career ==
=== Ireland ===
Ward won 19 caps for Ireland between 1978 and 1987. He made his international debut against Scotland at Lansdowne Road on 21 January 1978 at the age of 23, helping Ireland win 12–9. During the 1978 Five Nations Championship he scored 38 points, a record for a debutant. He made one major tour with Ireland, to Australia in 1979. During his career as an Ireland international he scored 113 points, including 29 penalties, 7 conversions and 4 drop goals. He played his last game for Ireland on 3 June 1987 in a 32–9 win over Tonga during the 1987 Rugby World Cup. Ward retired from international duty after the 1988 Ireland rugby union tour of France where he scored the winning points for the first win in France since 1972.

=== Munster ===
Ward also inspired Munster to a legendary win over New Zealand, scoring two drop goals and a conversion in a 12–0 victory at Thomond Park on 31 October 1978. To date Munster are the only Irish provincial men's team ever to beat the All-Blacks.

=== British and Irish Lions ===
Ward also played one Test game for the British and Irish Lions during the 1980 South Africa tour. He set a Lions Test record by scoring 18 points, including 5 penalties and a drop goal. It was also a record for any player against South Africa.

=== Awards ===
Ward was the first ever recipient of a European Rugby Player of the Year award for his performances in the 1979 Five Nations Championship.

== Association football ==
Tony Ward
Personal information
- Position: Midfielder

Youth career
- 1967–1972: Rangers AFC

Senior career*
Years	Team	Apps	(Gls)
1973–1977	Shamrock Rovers	39	(9)
1981–1982	Limerick	4	(0)

International career
1970	Republic of Ireland U15	3	(0)
- * Club domestic league appearances and goals

Ward also played under age football, where he played on the Republic of Ireland national Under-15 football team alongside Liam Brady.

A midfielder, Ward played for both Shamrock Rovers and Limerick United.

He made his League of Ireland debut for his boyhood team at Home Farm on 1 December 1973. In his second season with Rovers, 1974–75 he scored 6 league goals. Ward didn't play for the whole 1974–75 season and only played sporadically in his last season at Glenmalure Park. On his final appearance for the Hoops he scored in the same ground where he made his debut on 27 March 1977.

He played for Limerick United in the 1981–82 UEFA Cup and in 1982 he helped them win the FAI Cup.

His last game for Limerick was in Pat Nolan's testimonial in August 1982.

== Later years ==
=== Journalism ===
Since retiring as a sportsman, Ward has worked as a sports journalist, most notably with the Irish Independent, and as a rugby commentator for Raidió Teilifís Éireann (RTÉ).

Ward started as a co-commentator for the 1988 Five Nations Championship, and remained in that role for many years.

While playing rugby he had been a geography and PE teacher in St Andrews secondary school.

=== Coach ===
During the 1990s he worked a coach at St Andrew's College in Booterstown, Ireland. He helped with developing the youth rugby team.

== Personal ==
Ward's early years were spent in Leeds until his father's premature death in 1959 necessitated the family's return to Ireland. His grandfather Jack Donnelly played for St James's Gate in their first ever League of Ireland season of 1921/22 and scored in the club's first league fixture, a 5–1 win over Dublin United on 17 September 1921. The Gate won both the League and FAI Cup that season as well as the Leinster Senior Cup.

== Honours ==
Rugby

- Munster Senior Cup (rugby union) 2
  - Garryowen Football Club 1975, 1979
- Munster Senior League (rugby union)
  - Garryowen Football Club 1982
- IRFU Interprovincial Championship 3
  - Munster Rugby 1975–76, 1977–78, 1978–79

Association football

- FAI Cup
  - Limerick 1982
- Castrol Cup
  - Shamrock Rovers 1973

Individual

- Rugby World Golden Boot 2
  - Ireland national rugby union team 1978, 1979
- Rugby Writers of Ireland Player of the Year
  - Ireland national rugby union team 1979

== See also ==
- List of players who have converted from one football code to another

== Sources ==
- Paul Doolan; Robert Goggins. The Hoops. ISBN 0-7171-2121-6.
- The Good, the Bad and the Rugby - The Biography of Tony Ward - (ISBN 0-86121-463-3)
- Dave Galvin; Gerry Desmond. Irish Football Handbook. ISBN 0-9517987-3-1.
- Twelve Feet Tall, The Autobiography by Tony Ward (ISBN 9781471153570)
