= Niall Brophy =

Irish rugby union player

- Born: Niall Henry Brophy; 19 September 1935 Dublin, Ireland
- Died: 10 March 2023 (aged 87)
- Height: 1.83 m (6 ft 0 in)
- Weight: 83 kg (183 lb)
- School: O'Connell School and Blackrock College

Rugby union career
- Position: Wing
- Current team: Retired
Amateur team(s)
Years	Team	Apps	(Points)
- UCD
–	Blackrock College R.F.C.		
Senior career
Years	Team	Apps	(Points)
- Leinster
International career
Years	Team	Apps	(Points)
1957–67	Ireland	20	(12)
1959, 1962	Lions	2	(0)
- Correct as of 27 Jan 2012

Niall Henry Brophy (19 September 1935 – 10 March 2023) was an Irish rugby union player. He represented University College Dublin R.F.C., Blackrock College R.F.C., London Irish R.F.C., Barbarian F.C., Leinster, Ireland and the British and Irish Lions. He played as a winger. He also represented UCD and IUAA in athletics.

== Early life in sports ==
Brophy grew up in Clontarf with a keen interest in several sports and attended school in O'Connell School, where he was a keen athlete and member of Ronnie Delaney's relay team there. He subsequently attended Blackrock College. In 1954, he was Leinster Schools Athletic champion in both 100 yards and 220 yards and also took the same titles in the Irish Schools Athletics Championship. That same year, on St. Patrick's Day, Brophy captained Blackrock College to victory over Belvedere, captained by future Irish rugby teammate Tony O'Reilly, in the Leinster Schools Senior Cup (11–3).

== UCD rugby and athletics ==
Brophy graduated with a B.Comm from UCD. In athletics, Brophy had five appearances for UCD in Track & Field Championships in Ireland, taking gold in both the 100 yards and 220 yards in 1956 and again in 1960.

In rugby, Brophy, along with teammate Bill Mulcahy, became the first UCD players to represent the British and Irish Lions (then known as the British Lions), during their tour to Australia and New Zealand.

== Ireland ==
Brophy made his Ireland debut against France on 26 January 1957, during the 1957 Five Nations Championship. He scored his first try for Ireland in this game. His last test for Ireland was against Australia during Ireland's tour there in May 1967. Ireland won the match 5–11.

== British and Irish Lions ==
Brophy received his first Lions call-up in 1959 for the tour to Australia and New Zealand, but was not capped on this tour because of injury. He was called up again for the 1962 tour to South Africa, and this time won 2 Lions caps.

== After rugby ==
Brophy was President of the Leinster Branch in 1981–82, Blackrock College RFC in 1985-86 and the IRFU in 1997–98. He was inducted into the Rugby Writers of Ireland Hall of Fame in 2003, and into the Guinness Hall of Fame in 2011.

Brophy was also named in UCD's 'Team of the Century'.

Brophy was a regular golfer, playing in Portmarnock, Foxrock and Royal Porthcawl. He died on 10 March 2023, at the age of 87.
