= J. V. Smith =

English rugby union player (1926–2021)

John Vincent Smith (23 May 1926 – 17 September 2021) was an English rugby union player and administrator. He played for the national team at the 1950 Five Nations, and later served as President of the Rugby Football Union. At the time of his death aged 95 he was the oldest surviving England international.

He played at club level for Cambridge University, Barbarian, Stroud, and Rosslyn Park.

Smith died on 17 September 2021, at the age of 95.
