= Louis Crowe =

Irish rugby union player

- Full name: Louis Charles Crowe
- Born: 30 March 1928 Cahir, Co. Tipperary, Ireland
- Died: 19 September 1968 (aged 40) Hatfield, England
- School: Belvedere College
- University: University College Dublin

Rugby union career
- Position: Wing
International career
| Years | Team | Apps | (Points) |
| 1950 | Ireland | 3 | (3) |

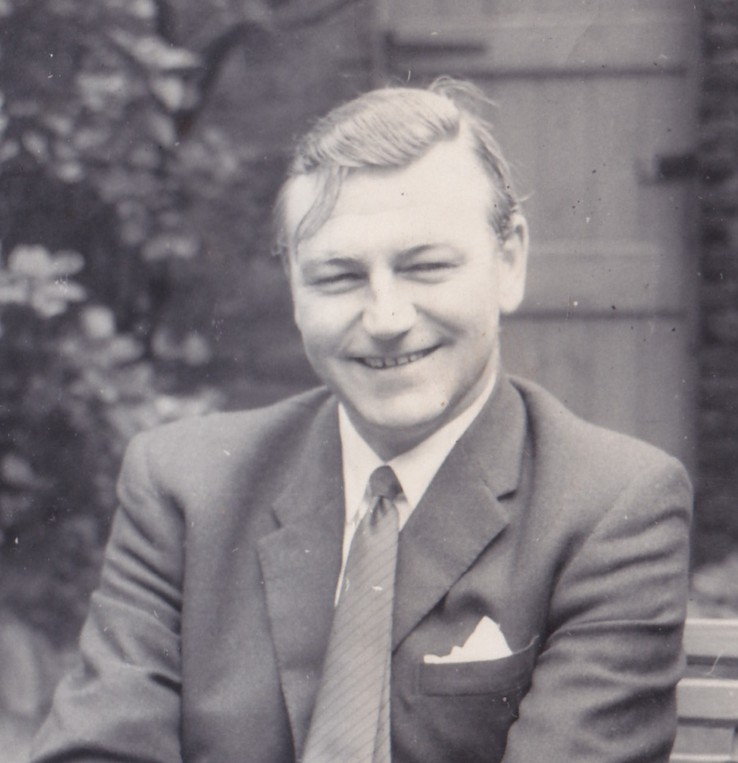
Louis Crowe

Louis Charles Crowe (30 March 1928 – 19 September 1968) was an Irish international rugby union player.

Born in Cahir, County Tipperary, Crowe was educated at Belvedere College after the family moved to Dublin and at University College Dublin where he studied science and then medicine.

Crowe started out in senior rugby as a fly-half and centre for his first few seasons at Old Belvedere, before earning an Ireland call up after impressing on the wing. He made three appearances during the 1950 Five Nations Championship and in the same year claimed the 100/220 yard sprint double at the Irish AAU Championships.

== See also ==
- List of Ireland national rugby union players
