= Trevor Brennan =

Irish former rugby union player

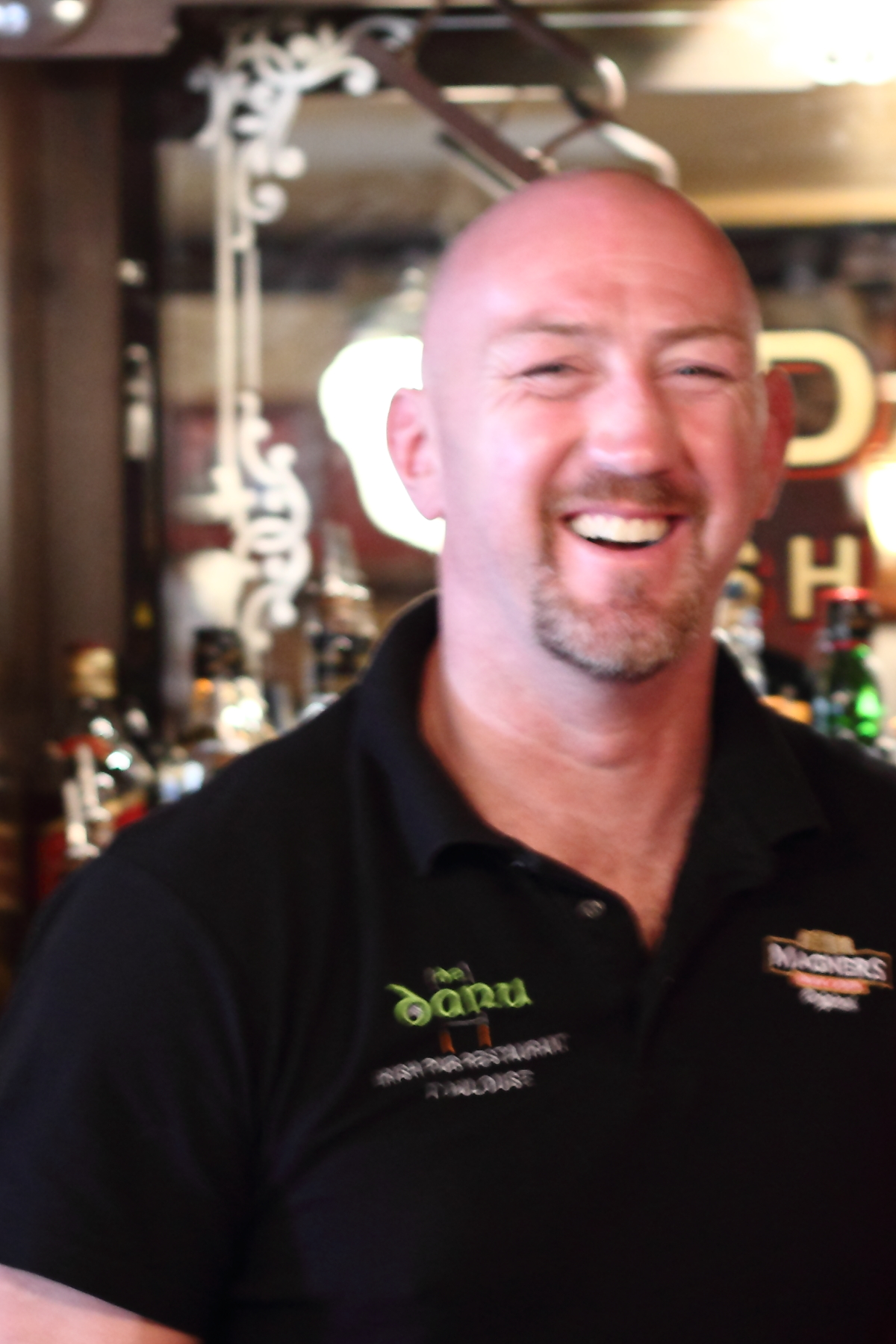
- Trevor Brennan at De Danú, his pub in Toulouse
- Born: 22 September 1973 (age 53) Leixlip, Ireland
- Height: 6 ft 5 in (1.96 m)
- Weight: 17 st 5 lb (110 kg)

Rugby union career
- Position: Second row or Flanker
Amateur team(s)
| Years | Team | Apps | (Points) |
- Barnhall
| 2001–2002 | Bective Rangers | | |
| – | St Marys College RFC | | |
Senior career
| Years | Team | Apps | (Points) |
| 2002–2007 | Stade Toulousain | 126 | (35) |
Provincial / State sides
| Years | Team | Apps | (Points) |
| 1996–2001 | Leinster Rugby | 47 | (5) |
- Correct as of 6 October 2014
International career
| Years | Team | Apps | (Points) |
| 1998–2001 | Ireland | 13 | (0) |

Trevor Brennan (born 29 September 1973) is an Irish former rugby union player. He played for Barnhall, Bective Rangers, St Marys College RFC, Leinster, Stade Toulousain and Ireland, being capped 13 times. He played either in the second row or as a flanker. In 2007 he attacked a fan and was banned for life, later reduced to five years.

== Career ==
Born in Leixlip, Ireland, Brennan began his career with Barnhall. He captained St Mary's College RFC to their first AIB League title in 2000.

Brennan made his debut for the senior Ireland team in a 13-37 defeat against South Africa on 13 June 1998 and went on to make 13 test appearances, including the 1999 Rugby World Cup. During this tournament that Brennan's abrasive image was tested, after a fight with Australia's Toutai Kefu, who was aided by two teammates who held Brennan's arms back.

After leaving Leinster for Stade Toulousain, Brennan fell out of favour with the Irish national team. He subsequently went on to play in three consecutive European Cup finals as part of the Stade Toulousain team, with two wins (Perpignan 2003, Stade Français 2005) and one defeat (against Wasps 2004).

== Ban and retirement ==
During a Toulouse v Ulster match at the Stade Ernest Wallon on 21 January 2007, Brennan jumped into a section of the crowd housing Ulster supporters and struck a male spectator. Brennan alleged afterwards that abuse towards his apparent "watered-down pints" in his Toulouse bar triggered his action. His uncle took this further alleging sectarian abuse had taken place, a claim initially supported by the club before swiftly being retracted. In their investigation of the incident European Rugby found no such abuse took place. They found that Brennan was being baited over the standard of the bar he co-owns in Toulouse.

Brennan announced his retirement on 3 March 2007, before the result of the disciplinary process. For his attack he was banned for life from playing rugby, fined £17,000 and ordered to pay £3,000 compensation to Bamford.

In June 2007, the ban was reduced to a 5-year suspension following an appeal. It was held that the life ban was 'disproportionate' to the offence. Bamford's recollection of events was recorded in the Independent Appeal Committee Decision's statement.

Following his retirement, Brennan and his family have remained in Toulouse, where he owns an Irish bar. He coached the Toulouse Crabos B under 18 team. Brennan has had occasional columns, written by Gerry Thornley, published in the Irish Times, and has appeared on television as a rugby commentator. After his retirement, he began operating a rugby tours company.

In 2007, Brennan's autobiography Heart and Soul, ghost-written by Gerry Thornley, won the William Hill Irish Sports Book of the Year.

In 2008, Ireland rugby fitness coach Mike McGurn and Brennan were part of the Ireland International rules football coaching staff in the International rules series against Australia. Both Brennan and McGurn played Gaelic football in their youth and were invited by the Irish manager Seán Boylan and the GAA to give their expertise from rugby in the game which is a mix of Aussie Rules and Gaelic football.

As of 2023, his sons Daniel (born 1998) and Joshua (born 2001) were both playing in the Top 14. Daniel has represented France at youth levels, and Joshua has been capped by the French senior side.
