= Andrew Dunne =

- Born: Andrew Dunne; 18 October 1979 (age 47) Dublin, Ireland
- Height: 5 ft 9 in (1.75 m)
- Weight: 13 st 3 lb (84 kg)
- School: Belvedere College S.J.
- University: UCD, Royal College of Surgeons, Ireland

Rugby union career
- Position: Fly-half
- Current team: Old Belvedere
Youth career
- Old Belvedere
Senior career
Years	Team	Apps	(Points)
2001–2003	Leinster	11	(35)
2003–2005	Harlequins	31	(161)
2005–2006	Bath	6	(23)
2006–2007	Leinster	5	(7)
2007–2010	Connacht	26	(78)
- Correct as of 19 January 2021
International career
Years	Team	Apps	(Points)
2008	Ireland Wolfhounds	2	(8)
National sevens team
Years	Team		Comps
2001	Ireland		

Andrew "Andy" Dunne born 18 October 1979 in Castleknock Dublin, Ireland is a former professional rugby union player for Leinster Rugby, NEC Harlequins, Bath Rugby and Connacht. He retired in 2009 following a ten-year career. He was educated at Belvedere College in Dublin where he won Schoolboy International caps in both rugby and cricket. He progressed to a Commerce degree in UCD on a sports scholarship, winning a Colours match in 1999 playing with Brian O'Driscoll. He later returned to his home club by joining Old Belvedere RFC, where he won 2 Leinster Senior Cups, and three All Ireland League titles - Division 2 (2006/7), Division 1B (2009/10) and finally was captain for the Dublin 4 club's All Ireland triumph of 2011.

The flyhalf represented Ireland in the 2001 Rugby Sevens World Cup in Mar Del Plata in Argentina, scoring the tournament's fastest try (7 seconds). In his first season of Premiership rugby in the UK the young Irish man won the Daily Telegraph Try of the Season. In the same season he went on to score the winning conversion in the 2004 European Challenge Cup vs Aurelien Rougerie's Clermont. His career did not progress significantly in the following years as expected due to a combination of injuries, club transfers and non-selection.

He was a member of the 2008 Six Nations training squad and won two caps with the Ireland A team that season.

== Retirement ==
Following knee surgery Dunne, retired in 2009 aged 29.

He qualified as a Chartered Physiotherapist soon afterwards and went on to work with Cricket Ireland in the 2014 Cricket World Cup in Bangladesh.

He is currently a member of the ISCP based in Dublin.
