= Harry Harbison =

Irish rugby union player

- Full name: Harry Thomas Harbison
- Born: 19 August 1957 (age 69) Dublin, Ireland

Rugby union career
- Position: Hooker
International career
Years	Team	Apps	(Points)
1984–87	Ireland	8	(0)

Harry Thomas Harbison (born 19 August 1957) is an Irish former rugby union international.

A Dublin native, Harbison was a hooker who was capped in eight Tests for Ireland, featuring in the 1984 and 1987 Five Nations Championships. He earned a place on the 1987 Rugby World Cup team but hurt his back during training and had to return home before the opening match against Wales, for which he would have been the starting hooker.

Harbison played for University College Dublin RFC while studying for an engineering degree and in 2011 was named on their Team of the Century. He also competed for the Bective Rangers, a club later captained by his son Conor.

== See also ==
- List of Ireland national rugby union players
