= Old Wesley R.F.C. =

Irish rugby union club, based in Dublin

(Republic of Ireland) Old Wesley
- Full name: Old Wesley Rugby Football Club
- Union: (Ireland) IRFU
- Branch: Leinster
- Founded: 1891; 135 years ago
- Ground(s): Donnybrook Rugby Ground, Dublin (Capacity: 6,000)
- Chairman: Andrew Bowers
- President: Patricia Parfrey
- Coach: Morgan Lennon
- Captain: Kiaran O'Shea
- League: All-Ireland Div. 1A
- 2025-26: 1st.
Team kit

Official website
- www.oldwesley.ie

Old Wesley Rugby Football Club was founded in 1891 from the past pupils of Wesley College, Dublin. It plays in Division 1A of the All-Ireland League. The club won the Leinster Senior Cup in 1909 and 1985 as well as winning the AIL Division 2 title in 1989 the AIL Division 2A title in 2015 and the AIL Division 1B in 2026. They celebrated their centennial year in 1991 with a match against a star-studded Barbarians team featuring Internationals such as Eric Rush, Pierre Berbizier and Tony Underwood. They won the eleven-try match in dramatic fashion with a last minute drop-goal by Adrian Hawe to win 37-36.

Through the early 1990s they were one of the most successful teams in Leinster, reaching three cup finals and consistently playing in the 1st Division of the AIL League. Old Wesley RFC were relegated from Division 1 in 1997 and the early years of professionalism marked a tough period for the club.

Old Wesley RFC were crowned AIL Division 3 Champions 2008/2009 following a 30 - 12 victory over Corinthians, gaining promotion to AIL Division 2.

Old Wesley RFC won AIL Division 2A in the 2014/2015 season, gaining promotion to Division 1B

Old Wesley RFC won AIL Division 1B in the 2025/2026 season, gaining promotion to Division 1A.

The club runs 6 men's teams from the 1st XV to 5th XV, and an Under 20s team. Old Wesley RFC also has a full underage structure from U14s down to u6s, these teams train and play on a Sunday.

== Honours ==
- Leinster Senior League Shield
  - Winners: 2011-12: 1

== Club Personnel ==
- In 2025, Patricia Parfrey was named as the Club President
- Kieran O'Shea was named the Club Captaion for 2025/2026 season
- The head coach for the 1XV team is Morgan Lennon

== Underage Teams ==
The Old Wesley RFC U-20 Team won the Premiership 2 title in 2019 and 2023/24 Purcell Cup Finalist.

In addition the club runs a full mini & youth rugby section with teams from U-8 level to U-17 level.

== Touch Rugby ==
Established in 2015 and based at the Energia Park (Donnybrook Stadium), the Old Welsey RFC Touch Rugby Club is the largest FIT affiliated club in Ireland.

== Location ==
Based in Donnybrook, Dublin 4 on the banks of the Dodder River, Old Wesley RFC share their ground with Bective Rangers FC and the Leinster Branch of the IRFU.

Until 2007 Old Wesley RFC played their junior matches at the Kilgobbin ground near Sandyford which they shared with Lansdowne FC. A new ground at Ballycorus was officially opened on 25 November 2007.

== Notable players ==
- Philip Orr
- Alan Doherty
- Eric Miller,
- Henry Hurley
- Chris Pim
- Robbie Love
- Dave Bursey
- Austen Carry
- George Hamlet
- Eric Campbell
- Andrew Porter - Mini player
- Ryan Baird - Mini player
- Stephen Smyth
