= Eric Campbell (rugby union) =

Irish rugby union player

- Full name: Charles Eric Campbell
- Born: 12 December 1942 Tullow, Co. Carlow, Ireland
- Died: 24 January 2006 (aged 63)

Rugby union career
- Position: Lock
International career
Years	Team	Apps	(Points)
1970	Ireland	1	(0)

Charles Eric Campbell (12 December 1942 — 24 January 2006) was an Irish rugby union international.

Campbell was born in Tullow, County Carlow and attended Dublin's Mountjoy School.

A lock, Campbell played for Old Wesley and Leinster, gaining a solitary Ireland cap in a draw against the Springboks at Lansdowne Road in 1970. It had been several decades since an Old Wesley player had been capped for Ireland.

Campbell worked as an oil company representative at the time of his rugby career.

== See also ==
- List of Ireland national rugby union players
