= Alanna Fitzpatrick =

Ireland international rugby union player

- Born: 17 October 2004 (age 22) Portarlington, County Laois, Ireland
- Height: 167 cm (5 ft 6 in)
- Weight: 64 kg (141 lb; 10 st 1 lb)

Rugby union career
Youth career
- PortDara Falcons
Senior career
Years	Team	Apps	(Points)
2022-	Blackrock		
National sevens team
Years	Team		Comps
2023-	Ireland		

Alanna Fitzpatrick (born 17 October 2004) is an Irish rugby union player who plays for Blackrock and the Ireland women's national rugby sevens team.

== Career ==
Fitzpatrick is from Portarlington, County Laois. She played interprovincial rugby from the age of 15 years-old. She played for PortDara Falcons and was part of the successful PortDara U-18 side who won the Leinster Cup in 2021. In April 2022, she was called up to the Irish under-18 team for the U18 Six Nations. She plays All Ireland League rugby for Blackrock, making her debut in November 2022.

Fitzpatrick made her debut for the Ireland women's national rugby sevens team at the Rugby European Sevens Championship Series in Hamburg, Germany in July 2023. At 18 years-old, she became one of the youngest players to ever represent Ireland in a senior rugby international, just a few weeks after finishing her Leaving Cert. She subsequently played for Ireland in Sevens Rugby in January 2024 at the SVNS Series tournament in Perth, Western Australia. The Irish team claimed their first World Series tournament victory at the event.

In 2024, She competed for Ireland at the Summer Olympics in Paris.
