= Tom Grace =

British Lions & Ireland international rugby union player (born 1948)

Thomas Oliver Grace (born 24 October 1948) is an Irish former rugby player. He played for University College Dublin RFC and St. Mary's College RFC winger in the 1960 and 1970s as well as for his province Leinster. He appeared for the Ireland national rugby union team during his career. He is best remembered for scoring Ireland's only try in the 10–10 draw with the All Blacks in 1973 at Lansdowne Road.

He represented the British and Irish Lions on the 1974 tour to South Africa. Grace played senior rugby for Newbridge College.

An accountant by profession he was one of Ireland's leading insolvency practitioners. He was Honorary Treasurer of the Irish Rugby Football Union for 13 years before retiring in 2020.
