= John Murphy (rugby union, born 1963) =

Irish rugby union player

- Full name: John Noel Murphy
- Born: 8 February 1963 (age 63) Dublin, Ireland

Rugby union career
- Position: Hooker
International career
Years	Team	Apps	(Points)
1992	Ireland	1	(0)

John Noel Murphy (born 8 February 1963) is an Irish former rugby union international.

Murphy grew up near Dublin in the town of Bray, attending Presentation College.

A hooker, Murphy played for Greystones, Leinster and Brisbane club Souths, before earning his only Ireland cap in 1992 at age 29. He was called up to play against Australia at Lansdowne Road, following a strong performance for Leinster against the same opponent a fortnight earlier and was in the starting XV, with regular hooker Steve Smith dropped.

== See also ==
- List of Ireland national rugby union players
