= Philip Orr =

Irish rugby union footballer

Philip Andrew Orr (born 14 December 1950) is a former Irish international rugby union loosehead prop who played for the British Lions. Born in Dublin, Orr was educated at The High School, Dublin, and Trinity College Dublin. He played for Old Wesley for over 20 years and was captain of the team that lifted the Leinster Senior Cup in 1985, his club's first Leinster Senior Cup title in 76 years. In the 1983–84 season he achieved a new record of caps for an Irish prop, reaching 43, all consecutive. For many years Orr was his country's most-capped prop with a then-world record 58 appearances. Orr would have reached 50 consecutive caps were it not for being dropped during the 1986 Five Nations Championship, a decision that "defied belief". He was recalled after one match and made his fiftieth appearance against Scotland.

"One of the most durable forwards of his or any other generation" and a ball-carrying prop, he made his debut against France in 1976 and was part of the Irish teams that won a Triple Crown in 1982 and 1985. French tighthead prop, Jean-Pierre Garuet, called Orr his most difficult opponent, a "colossus ('colosse')" his predecessor Robert Paparemborde had warned him about. The only major international team Orr never played against was the Springboks, who were absent from world rugby for a generation.

Orr toured with the Lions to New Zealand in 1977, winning one cap, and was a replacement during the tour of South Africa in 1980. In all he played 17 times for the Lions but was not available for the 1983 tour to New Zealand due to business reasons. His last international appearance came on 7 June 1987, at the advanced age of 36 years and 162 days, in Ireland's quarter-final defeat to Australia during the inaugural Rugby World Cup.

In 1991, Orr was president of Old Wesley in its centenary year. In 2009, he was elected to the Irish Rugby Football Union Committee, and was the president of the organisation between 14 July 2017 and 13 July 2018.

Orr played for the Barbarians on six occasions from 1977 to 1984. He has been a Barbarian trustee for a number of years.

He owned a clothing manufacturing company in Dublin.

== See also ==
- Rugby World, "Phil Orr Profile", April 1977, December 1982, October 1985
