= 1950 Five Nations Championship =

Rugby union competition

- Date: 14 January - 25 March 1950
- Countries: England; Ireland; France; Scotland; Wales

Tournament statistics
- Champions: Wales (11th title)
- Grand Slam: Wales (4th title)
- Triple Crown: Wales (8th title)
- Matches played: 10

The 1950 Five Nations Championship was the twenty-first series of the rugby union Five Nations Championship. Including the previous incarnations as the Home Nations and Five Nations, this was the fifty-sixth series of the northern hemisphere rugby union championship. Ten matches were played between 14 January and 25 March. It was contested by England, France, Ireland, Scotland and Wales. Wales won their 11th title, and also the Grand Slam and the Triple Crown.

== Participants ==
The teams involved were:

Nation	Venue	City	Captain
England	Twickenham	London	Ivor Preece
France	Stade Olympique Yves-du-Manoir	Colombes	Guy Basquet
Ireland	Lansdowne Road/Ravenhill	Dublin/Belfast	Karl Mullen
Scotland	Murrayfield	Edinburgh	Doug Elliot/Peter Kininmonth
Wales	St. Helen's/National Stadium	Swansea/Cardiff	John Gwilliam

== Table ==
Pos	Team	Pld	W	D	L	PF	PA	PD	Pts
1	Wales	4	4	0	0	50	8	+42	8
2	Scotland	4	2	0	2	21	49	−28	4
3	Ireland	4	1	1	2	27	12	+15	3
3	France	4	1	1	2	14	35	−21	3
5	England	4	1	0	3	22	30	−8	2

== Results ==
1950-01-14

Scotland	8–5	France
Try: Macdonald; Budge c Con: Lockhart		Try: Merquey; Con: Prat (1/1)

Edinburgh

1950-01-21

England	5–11	Wales
Try: Smith; Con: Hofmeyr (1/1)		Try: C Davies; Cale c Con: Robins (0/1); L Jones (1/1); Pen: L Jones

London

1950-01-28

France	3–3	Ireland
Drop: Lauga		Pen: Burges

Colombes

1950-02-04

Wales	12–0	Scotland
Try: Thomas; K Jones; Con: L Jones (0/2); Pen: L Jones; Drop: Cleaver

Cardiff

1950-02-11

England	3–0	Ireland
Try: Roberts

London

1950-02-25

France	6–3	England
Try: Pilon; Cazenave		Try: Smith

Colombes

1950-02-25

Ireland	21–0	Scotland
Try: Blayney c Curtis c Crowe c Con: Norton (3/3); Pen: Norton 2

Dublin

1950-03-11

Ireland	3–6	Wales
Pen: Norton		Try: Jones; Thomas

Belfast

1950-03-18

Scotland	13–11	England
Try: Scott; Abercrombie c Sloan c Con: Gray (2/3)		Try: Smith; Smith; Con: Hofmeyr (1/2); Pen: Hofmeyr

Edinburgh

1950-03-25

Wales	21–0	France
Try: Matthews c K Jones c K Jones c John; Con: L Jones (3/4); Pen: L Jones

Cardiff
