= Greystones RFC =

Irish rugby union club based in Greystones, Co.Wicklow

Greystones
- Full name: Greystones Rugby Football Club
- Union: (Ireland) IRFU
- Branch: Leinster
- Founded: 1937; 89 years ago
- Region: County Wicklow
- Ground(s): Dr Hickey Park; Mill Road; Greystones
- Chairman: Marc Evans
- President: Gary Nolan
- Director of Rugby: Cillian Willis
- Coach: Danny Kenny
- Captain: Eoin Marmion
- League: All-Ireland Div. 2A
- 2024–25: 4th.
Team kit

Official website
- www.greystonesrfc.ie

Greystones Rugby Football Club is a rugby union club based in Greystones, County Wicklow in the Republic of Ireland, playing in Division 2A of the All-Ireland League. The club was formed in 1937. They won their first trophy in 1944 when they won the Metropolitan League .

== Notable former players ==
=== Ireland ===
The following Greystones players represented Ireland at full international level.

- Reggie Corrigan
- Tony Doyle
- Paul McNaughton
- John N. Murphy
- John J. Murphy
- Nick Popplewell
- Brian Rigney
- John Robbie
- Tony Ward

=== British and Irish Lions ===
As well as representing Ireland, several Greystones players also represented the British and Irish Lions. Both Robbie and Popplewell were attached to Greystones when they represented the Lions.

- John Robbie: 1980
- Tony Ward: 1980
- Nick Popplewell: 1993

=== Other internationals ===
- (Samoa) Tom Curtis
- (South Africa) Pieter Muller
- (United States) Dylan Fawsitt
- (United States) Chip Howard
- (Netherlands) Quermy Warmerdam

== Honours ==
- A.I.L. Division 2B
  - Winners : 2016-17, 2022-23
- Metro League Division 7
  - Winners : 2015-16:
- Leinster Senior Shield
  - Winners : 2015-16:
- A.I.L. Division Two
  - Winners: 2006-07:
- A.I.L. Division Three
  - Winners: 2003–04, 2004-05: 2
- Leinster Senior League
  - Runners Up : 1980: 1
- Leinster Club Senior Cup
  - Runners Up : 1983, 1994, 1995: 3
- Metropolitan League
  - Winners: 1944: 1
- Metropolitan Cup
  - Winners: 1996: 1
