= Daniel Sheehan =

Daniel Sheehan may refer to:

- D. D. Sheehan (1873–1948), Irish nationalist and author
- Daniel E. Sheehan (1917–2000), American Roman Catholic prelate, archbishop of Omaha
- Daniel Sheehan (attorney), co-founder of the Christic Institute

== See also ==
- Dan Sheehan (rugby union) (born 1998), Irish rugby union player
- Dan Sheahan, American baseball player
