= De La Salle Palmerston =

Irish rugby union club based in Kilternan, Co.Dublin

(Ireland) De La Salle Palmerston
- Full name: De La Salle Palmerston Football Club
- Union: IRFU; Leinster
- Nickname: Salmo (formerly Palmo)
- Founded: 1899; 127 years ago
- Ground(s): Kirwan Park, Kilternan, County Dublin (Capacity: 22,000)
Team kit

Official website
- www.dlspfc.ie

De La Salle Palmerston FC is an Irish rugby union team. The senior team currently play in the Leinster League. The senior side had a short spell in Division 1 starting in the 1998–99 season. The club grounds, Kirwan Park are located between Stepaside and Kilternan.

The club in its present form was founded in 1985, after the amalgamation of the De La Salle (1965) and Palmerston (1899) clubs.

The senior club field a first XV, seconds, thirds, fourths, women's, special needs and an under-20 team. The club has a large minis and youth section fielding teams from "Daisy Pickers" 3/4 year old and then from under 6's to under 18's. De La Salle Palmerston is also home to the Dublin Rebels, the most successful team in the American Football Ireland league.
