= Ray Finn (rugby union) =

Irish rugby union player

- Full name: Raymond Gerard Andrew Finn
- Born: 25 November 1953 (age 72) Dublin, Ireland

Rugby union career
- Position: Centre
International career
Years	Team	Apps	(Points)
1977	Ireland	1	(0)

Raymond Gerard Andrew Finn (born 25 November 1953) is an Irish former rugby union international.

Finn, a Dublin-born centre, was a Leinster Schools Senior Cup winner with Belvedere College.

While competing with University College Dublin, Finn gained an Ireland cap in a 1977 Five Nations Championship match against France at Lansdowne Road. He later played for Letterkenny RFC.

== See also ==
- List of Ireland national rugby union players
