= Blackrock College RFC =

Irish rugby union club, based in County Dublin

Blackrock College
- Full name: Blackrock College Rugby Football Club
- Union: (Ireland) IRFU
- Branch: Leinster
- Nickname: Rock
- Founded: 1882; 144 years ago
- Region: County Dublin
- Ground(s): Stradbrook Road; Blackrock, Dublin
- Chairman: Pat Finn
- President: Mick Dwan
- League: All-Ireland Div. 1B
- 2025–26: 6th.
Team kit

Official website
- www.blackrockcollegerfc.ie

Blackrock College Rugby Football Club is a rugby union club located in Blackrock, Dublin, Ireland. The club was founded in 1882 by former pupils of Blackrock College. Their senior team currently plays in Division 1B of the All-Ireland League

Blackrock College RFC was founded in 1882 making it one of the oldest senior rugby clubs in Ireland. While it bears the name and is closely affiliated to the school at Williamstown, it is a very open local club.

The club fields adult men's and women's teams, under 20s and has a mini and youth section, all of whom are involved in the various competitions throughout Leinster.

The men's senior adult team in Blackrock College RFC is in division 1B of the AIL. The club has a long tradition of producing players for the International side many of whom have also represented the Lions.

== Honours ==
- Leinster Senior Cup (8) 1937, 1939, 1957, 1961, 1983, 1988, 1992, 1999
- Leinster Senior League (5) 1975, 1982, 1983, 1991, 2026-27
- League Section B (1) 1989
- Smithwicks Floodlit Cup (2) 1993, 1997
- Castle Trophy (2) 1978, 1983
- Bateman Cup (1) 1939
- All Ireland League 2nd Division (1) 2000
- Paddy Moore Memorial Shield (2) 2002, 2008
- Jerry Fogarty Memorial Cup (4) 2001, 2002, 2005, 2007
- Brian McLoughlin Memorial Cup (1) 2008
- Brendan Merry Memorial Plate (1) 2008
- Junior 1 League (10) 1900, 1922, 1935, 1948, 1974, 1975, 1977, 1979, 1984, 2016
- Leinster Junior Cup (5) 1889, 1892, 1893, 1898, 1899
- Metropolitan Cup (9) 1929, 1938, 1962, 1975, 1976, 1977, 1984, 2001, 2024
- Junior 2 (Minor) League (14) 1925, 1926, 1927, 1930, 1937, 1938, 1958, 1961, 1964, 1982, 1993, 2005, 2006, 2007
- Albert O’Connell Cup (8) 1959, 1965, 1975, 1976, 1982, 2001, 2004, 2005
- Winters Cup (5) 1965, 1967, 1974, 1975, 1997
- Junior 3 League (3) 1972, 1974, 1998
- Moran Cup (11) 1966, 1975, 1976, 1986, 1989, 1991, 1992, 1993, 1995, 2002, 2004
- Junior 4 League (2) 1983, 1990
- James O’Connor Cup (6) 1965, 1988, 1991, 2004, 2005, 2007
- Guilfoyle Cup (3) 1987, 1990, 1991, 2012
- Tom Fox Cup (7) 1971, 1973, 1980, 1981, 1992, 1993, 2001
- Greenlea Cup (10) 1974, 1975, 1976, 1977, 1983, 1984, 1993, 1998, 1999, 2000
- McCorry Cup (9) 1972, 1988, 1990, 1991, 1997, 1998, 2003, 2004, 2007, 2010
- Junior Pennant (3) 1975, 1976, 1977
- Fraser McMullen All Ireland U’20 Cup (2) 1997, 1998
- J. P. Fanagan Cup (6) 1997, 1998, 2000, 2006, 2007, 2008
- Under 20s Pennant (3) 2001, 2003, 2007
- Hartigan Cup (Under 20s) (2) 2004, 2009
- Under 20s Purcell Cup (1) 2008
- Women All Ireland League (5) 1993, 1995, 1996, 1997, 2008
- Women All Ireland Cup Winners (3) 2002, 2006, 2007
- Youths (2) 2009 League & Cup Double
- Lorcan Sherlock Golf Cup (6) 1938, 1960, 1964, 1969, 1981, 1997

== Notable former players ==
=== Ireland ===
The following Blackrock players represented Ireland at full international level.

- Niall Brophy
- Ned Byrne
- Shane Byrne
- Bob Casey
- Brian O'Driscoll
- Victor Costello
- Ian Madigan
- Mick Doyle
- Willie Duggan
- Guy Easterby
- Neil Francis
- Ray McLoughlin
- Luke Fitzgerald
- Hugo MacNeill
- Leo Cullen
- Job Langbroek
- Brendan Mullin
- Alain Rolland
- Paul Wallace
- Niall Woods
- Ciaran Scally
- Richardt Strauss
- Trevor Hogan
- Andrew Conway
- Alanna Fitzpatrick
- Jordi Murphy
- Hugo Keenan

=== British & Irish Lions ===
As well as representing Ireland, the following Blackrock players also went on to represent the British & Irish Lions.

- Niall Brophy: 1959, 1962
- Ray McLoughlin: 1966
- Mick Doyle: 1968
- Fergus Slattery: 1971, 1974
- Willie Duggan: 1977
- Hugo MacNeill: 1983
- Brendan Mullin: 1989
- Paul Wallace: 1997
- Shane Byrne: 2005
- Brian O'Driscoll: 2001, 2005, 2009, 2013
- Luke Fitzgerald: 2009

=== Ireland Sevens Olympians ===
- Alanna Fitzpatrick: 2024
- Beibhinn Parsons; 2024
- Kathy Baker: 2024
- Hugo Keenan: 2024
- Bryan Mollen: 2020, 2024
- Gavin Mullin: 2024

=== Other internationals ===
The following Blackrock players have also played at international level.

- (New Zealand) Stephen Bachop
- (South Africa) Gavin Johnson
- (New Zealand) Mike Brewer
- (United States) AJ MacGinty
- (United States) Brett Thompson
- (Japan) Luke Thompson
