= John Robbie =

Irish rugby union player

John Cameron Robbie
- Born: John Cameron Robbie; 17 November 1955 (age 70) Dublin, Ireland
- School: High School Dublin
- University: Trinity College; Christ's College, Cambridge

Rugby union career
- Position: Scrum-half
International career
Years	Team	Apps	(Points)
1976–81	Ireland	9	(9)
1980	Lions	1	(0)

John Cameron Robbie (born 17 November 1955) is a well known radio presenter in South Africa on Talk radio 702, and a former Ireland international rugby union player who played scrum half. His previous rugby career has also seen him take up the role of rugby commentator, both on television and in the press, particularly at the Independent Newspapers. He is a Laureus Sport for Good Foundation Ambassador.

== Life and career ==
John Robbie went to The High School, Dublin, where he was a member of the Leinster Schools Cup winning side in 1973. He then attended Trinity College and Christ's College, Cambridge, and was captain of the rugby teams at both universities.

He received his first cap for Ireland against Australia in Lansdowne Road on 17 January 1976, and went on to receive 9 caps for Ireland. He toured South Africa in 1980 with the British and Irish Lions playing in one test match, and at the time played club rugby for Greystones RFC; see 1980 British Lions tour to South Africa. He moved to South Africa in 1981. He was later picked twice for the South African rugby team but never received a cap, at the time he was playing for Transvaal.

As a talk show host, he has "interviewed a range of important figureheads, from heads of government and key players in the political arena, to sporting heroes, business gurus..." and is "not afraid to ask the difficult questions. He's hard-hitting, while remaining fair and honest." He became known for his motto "Cut the Slush!", pushing the other party to get to the point.

After a career in talk radio spanning 30 years, he has announced his retirement from radio with his farewell segment being his usual morning slot on 15 December 2016.
