= University College Dublin R.F.C. =

Irish rugby union club, based in County Dublin

UCD
- Full name: University College Dublin Rugby Football Club
- Union: (Ireland) IRFU
- Branch: Leinster
- Nickname: Collidge
- Founded: 1910; 116 years ago
- Region: Dublin
- Ground: UCD Bowl (Capacity: 3,000)
- Chairman: Collie Condon
- President: David Carrigy
- Coach: Kevin Croke
- Captain: Bobby Sheehan
- League: All-Ireland Div. 1A
- 2024–25: 8th.
Team kit

Official website
- ucdrugby.com

University College Dublin Rugby Football Club (also referred as UCD) is a rugby union club based in Dublin, Ireland, and plays in Division 1A of the All-Ireland League. They play their home games at UCD Bowl.

The club was founded in 1910 and they won their first trophy, the Leinster Junior Challenge Cup, in 1914. In 1924 they won their first Leinster Club Senior Cup. Since 1952 they have also played an annual challenge game, the Colours Match against their rivals Dublin University. In 1993 when the AIB League was expanded to four divisions to include 46 senior clubs, UCD and four other university clubs joined the league.

In 2001 UCD won the AIB League Division 2 title, gaining promotion to Division 1. They have continued to play in the same division until the 2008–09 season when they finished second from bottom and were relegated. They were the first Irish university rugby club to play in AIB League top division and have now been joined by rivals Dublin University Football Club.

== Notable players ==
=== Ireland national rugby union team ===
In 1920 Andy Courtney became the first UCD player to represent the Ireland national rugby union team. The following UCD players also represented Ireland at full international level.

- Barry Bresnihan
- John Cantrell
- Eugene Davy
- Mick Doyle
- Tony Ensor
- Tom Grace
- Harry Harbison
- Denis Hickie
- Rob Kearney
- Dan Leavy
- Fergus McFadden
- Luke McGrath
- Kevin McLaughlin
- Ray McLoughlin
- Seán O'Brien
- Brian O'Driscoll
- Kevin O'Flanagan
- Darragh O'Mahony
- Garry Ringrose
- Rhys Ruddock
- Ciaran Scally
- Fergus Slattery
- James Tracy
- Josh van der Flier
- Paddy Wallace

=== British & Irish Lions ===
In 1959 Niall Brophy and Bill Mulcahy become the first UCD players to represent the British & Irish Lions. Since then several UCD players have also played for the Lions.

- Niall Brophy: 1959, 1962
- Bill Mulcahy: 1959
- Barry Bresnihan: 1966, 1968
- Ray McLoughlin: 1966
- Mick Doyle: 1968
- Fergus Slattery: 1971, 1974
- Tom Grace: 1974
- Denis Hickie: 2005
- Brian O'Driscoll: 2001, 2005, 2009, 2013
- Rob Kearney: 2009, 2013
- Seán O'Brien: 2013, 2017

=== Ireland national rugby sevens team ===
- Harry McNulty
- Billy Dardis
- Hugo Keenan
- James Norton

=== Other internationals ===
The following UCD players have also played at international level.

- (New Zealand) David Hewett
- (Russia) Vasily Artemiev
- (Sweden) Stefan Obradovic
- (United States) Ben Barclay
- (United States) Jamie Jane
- (Turks and Caicos Islands) Sean O'Neill
- (Italy) Ian McKinley

See also Category:University College Dublin R.F.C. players

== Honours ==
- All-Ireland Cup
  - 1937–38
- Leinster Senior Cup
  - 1923–24, 1937–38, 1947–48, 1962–63, 1963–64, 1969–70, 1976–77, 2010–11, 2013–14, 2015–16, 2019–20: 11
- Leinster Junior Challenge Cup
  - 1914: 1
