= St Mary's College RFC =

Irish rugby union club, based in County Dublin

St. Mary's College
- Full name: St. Mary's College Rugby Football Club
- Union: (Ireland) IRFU
- Branch: Leinster
- Nickname(s): Mary's, Maro's, Blues, Blue Army
- Founded: 1900; 126 years ago
- Region: County Dublin
- Ground: Templeville Road (Capacity: 4,000)
- League: All-Ireland Div. 1A
- 2025–26: Champions
Team kit

Official website
- www.stmaryscollegerfc.com

St Mary's College Rugby Football Club is a rugby union club based in South Dublin, Ireland, playing in Division 1A of the All-Ireland League. The club was founded in 1900 by former pupils of St. Mary's College, Dublin and was originally known as Old St Mary's. The club won the Leinster Senior Cup for the first time in 1958. In 2000 they won the AIB League for the first time under the captaincy of Trevor Brennan.

The club was formerly sited at College Drive, Templeogue from 1955 until the 1970s, including clubhouse and grounds which have since been developed as Fortfield Square apartments. In the 1970s, the club moved to Templeville Road to rugby grounds formerly owned and used by Templeogue College, the Holy Ghost Fathers sister school of St Mary's College.

== Honours ==
- All Ireland League (3): 1999–2000, 2011–12, 2025–26
- All-Ireland Cup (1): 1974–75
- Leinster Senior League (4): 1972, 1978, 1980, 1989
- Leinster Senior Cup (11): 1958, 1969, 1971, 1974, 1975, 1987, 1993, 1995, 2005, 2010, 2013
- Leinster Junior Challenge Cup (4): 1905, 1907, 1908, 1911

== Notable players ==
=== Ireland ===
The following St Mary's players represented Ireland at full international level:

- Trevor Brennan
- Jack McGrath
- Victor Costello
- Vince Cunningham
- Paul Dean
- Ciaran Fitzgerald
- Keith Gleeson
- Tom Grace
- Denis Hickie
- Shane Jennings
- Sean Lynch
- John Moloney
- Rodney O'Donnell
- Malcolm O'Kelly
- Johnny Sexton
- Tony Ward
- Rhys Ruddock
- Jordan Larmour
- Caelan Doris

=== Ireland 7s ===
The following St Mary’s players have represented the Ireland national rugby sevens team:

- Terry Kennedy

=== British & Irish Lions ===
As well as representing Ireland, the following St Mary's players have also represented the British & Irish Lions.

- Sean Lynch: 1971
- John Moloney: 1974
- Tom Grace:1974
- Rodney O'Donnell: 1980
- Tony Ward: 1980
- Ciaran Fitzgerald: 1983
- Paul Dean: 1989
- Vince Cunningham: 1993
- Malcolm O'Kelly: 2001
- Denis Hickie: 2005
- Johnny Sexton: 2013, 2017
- Jack McGrath: 2017
