= Peter Clinch (economist) =

Irish economist

Peter Clinch is an Irish academic and economist, who has served as Chairperson of Science Foundation Ireland.

== Career ==
Clinch's academic specialisms are sustainable economic growth and environmental economics. In 2002, he co-authored After the Celtic Tiger with Brendan Walsh and Frank Convery pointing out fragilities in the Irish economy in advance Ireland's economic crisis. Clinch was a critic of Irish government decisions on planning policy and decentralisation during the Irish Celtic Tiger boom describing the latter as “totally inconsistent with the National Spatial Strategy" and was said to be unenthusiastic about Ireland's social partnership model. He was subsequently employed as Special Adviser to the Taoiseach (prime minister) of Ireland between June 2008 and January 2011 where he advised on medium-term economic policy, enterprise policy and environmental policy which included drafting the productivity growth plan “Building Ireland’s Smart Economy” published by the Government in December 2008. He was a participant in the first Irish Global Economic Forum in September 2009.

He is Jean Monnet (Full) Professor and Chair of Public Policy at University College Dublin. He is a former Vice-President of University College Dublin UCD where he had responsibility for Innovation and Corporate Partnerships.

Clinch is chairperson of Science Foundation Ireland and former Chair of the National Competitiveness Council of Ireland.

He has over 100 publications.

== Awards and honours ==
- Fellow of the Academy of Social Sciences
- Lifetime Honorary Member of the Royal Town Planning Institute
