= Clontarf F.C. =

Irish rugby club

Clontarf
- Full name: Clontarf Rugby Football Club
- Union: (Ireland) IRFU
- Branch: Leinster
- Nickname(s): Tarf, The Bulls
- Founded: 1876; 150 years ago
- Region: County Dublin
- Ground: Castle Avenue (Capacity: 3,200)
- President: Austin Foxe
- Coach(es): Andy Wood, Karl Curren, Ian Smith
- Captain: Dylan Donnellan
- League: A.I.L. Div. 1A
- 2024–25: 1st. (Champions)
Team kit

Official website
- www.clontarfrugby.com

Clontarf Football Club is an Irish Rugby union club based in Clontarf, Dublin. The club play in Division 1A of the All-Ireland League.

== History ==
=== Origins and early history ===
Clontarf Football Club currently play at Castle Avenue, where they moved to in 1896. The club gets its mascot from the meaning of Clontarf, which translates as "meadow of the bull". The red and blue colors are used by most sporting clubs in the area. The club was formed before the establishment of the Irish Rugby Football Union.

=== Separate and shared facilities ===
Since 1896, the grounds at Castle Avenue have been shared with Clontarf Cricket Club. Until 1947, both games were played on the same ground, and the wicket was fenced off in the winter. In 1982, following a fire which destroyed the bar and lounge, an agreement was reached between both clubs to go their separate ways. Subsequently, each club was provided with separate premises and the use of a common main bar and hall for each club's season.

=== Playing highlights ===
In 1902, Clontarf was admitted to Senior Ranks — Leinster League — and in the following year reached the final of the Leinster Club Senior Cup, where they were beaten by Lansdowne by one goal (5 points) to one try (3 points).

Other notable moments in the club's history include winning the Leinster Club Senior Cup in 1936, a feat which remained unmatched amongst Clontarf teams for another 63 years, until the cup returned to Castle Avenue in April 1999. However, the intervening years were not without success as various teams representing the club won leagues and cups in the 1940s, 1950s, 1960s, and 1970s.

Clontarf won the Leinster Floodlight Competition in 1989, 1990, 1997, and 1998, the All Ireland Floodlight Competition in 1990, and the All Ireland League Division II in 1996/97. Since attaining Division 1 status in 1997, Clontarf has maintained its position as one of the top twelve clubs in Ireland. It has reached three All Ireland League division one finals, two of them to record winners Shannon. The club has produced a number of professional rugby players such as Cian Healy, Emile Prior, Brian O'Driscoll, Tadgh Furlong, Matt D'Arcy, Michael None, and Joey Carbery.{{November 1 1995 }}a

During their 1966 world tour the club had only one loss to the Athletic Rugby Football Club of New Zealand captained by I.N. McEwan. Among the teams played were Black heath from England, and Cardiff of Wales.

In 2014, Clontarf won the All-Ireland League for the first time in the club's history, topping the table by a point, after a finish which saw Clontarf beat Ballynahinch at Castle Avenue while Old Belvedere lost to Garryowen, giving Clontarf the title. Four days after this victory, the same Clontarf side faced Barbarians F.C. to mark the 1000 year anniversary of the Battle of Clontarf. Clontarf were winners on the day, running out 43–42.

== In the community ==
On a local level, the club runs a "mini" rugby team and youth rugby is of importance to the club. The club has won several mini rugby competitions over recent seasons. For the 2018/2019 season, a Girls Youth team was set up and trains twice a week at the club.

The club has had an association with the local St Paul's College, Raheny and Mount Temple Comprehensive School, as well as Belvedere College in central Dublin, for several years. The club also has a social committee, with theme nights, awards balls, golf outings, and Tag Rugby runs during the summer months.

== Teams ==
Clontarf have teams from senior level down as young as under-8. At senior level, there are five teams, the firsts play in the AIL Division 1, while the rest of the senior teams play in the Leinster Metropolitan Leagues. In 2007/2008 the first team won the Leinster League cup beating St Mary's College in the final. They were also a runner-up in the J1 Section A league, and runners-up in the J4 league. The J2 team won the J2 section B gaining promotion to J2 section A. In 2014/2015, the J4 team won the Leinster Branch Metro League Division 6 title and won promotion to division 5. The J6 team won the 2016/2017 Leinster Branch Metro League Division 11 title and won promotion to division 10.

== Honours ==
- All-Ireland League Winners 2014, 2016, 2022, 2025. Runners up 2013, 2017
- Leinster Club Senior Cup Winners 1936, 1999, 2002, 2024-25
- Metropolitan Cup Winners 2012

== International players ==
- Mick McGrath - plays for the Ireland national rugby sevens team
- Cian Healy - plays for Ireland and British and Irish Lions
- Tadhg Furlong - plays for Ireland and British and Irish Lions
- Joey Carbery - plays for Ireland
- Noel Reid - plays for SU Agen Lot-et-Garonne and formerly Ireland
