= Bective Rangers =

Irish rugby union club based in Dublin, Co.Dublin

Bective Rangers FC
- Full name: Bective Rangers Football Club
- Union: (Ireland) IRFU (Leinster Branch)
- Nickname: Rangers
- Founded: 1881; 145 years ago
- Ground(s): Donnybrook Rugby Ground, Dublin (Capacity: 6,000)
- President: Jimmy White
- Coach: Ben Manion
- Captain: Matthew Gilsenan
Team kit

Bective Rangers Football Club is a rugby union club in Dublin, Ireland founded in 1881. The Club is affiliated to the Leinster Branch of the Irish Rugby Football Union and played in Division 1A of the Leinster League until the 2024-25 Season. Having won the All Ireland League Provincial Qualifier in April 2025, the club will return to the Energia All Ireland league Division 2C in the 2025/26 Season. The club plays its games at the Donnybrook Rugby Ground in Donnybrook with a second grounds at Glenamuck. The Club fields teams from Minis, Youth, U20s Juniors, Senior and Vets.

== History ==
The club origins stem from the establishment of Bective House College by Dr. John Lardner Burke at 15 Rutland Square (now Parnell Square East) in 1834. Bective house was one of a number of houses on the square owned by the Earl of Bective for whom the house was named. The school later moved to North Great George's Street and later again to Clontarf but kept its original name. Notable past pupils of the school included Bram Stoker, author of Dracula.

The title of Earl of Bective was taken from the Earl's estate at Bective Abbey and castle in County Meath.

The club was originally named Bective College and later Bective FC from the 1870s and was established by past pupils of the school. It was officially founded in 1881.

== Honours ==
- All-Ireland Cup
  - 1922–23, 1924–25
- Leinster Senior Cup
  - 1889, 1892, 1910, 1914, 1923, 1925, 1932, 1934, 1935, 1955, 1956, 1962
- Leinster League Division 1
  - 2021-22, 2022-23, 2024-2025
- All-Ireland Junior Cup
  - 2024-25
- Spencer Cup
  - 2024-25
- All Ireland league Provincial Qualifier
  - 2025

== Notable former players ==
- (South Africa) Danie Poolman
- (Ireland) Trevor Brennan
- (Ireland) James Leo Farrell
- (Wales) Cliff Morgan
- (Ireland) Paddy O'Donoghue
- (Ireland) Harry Harbison
- (Ireland) Denis Coulson

== Notable former coaches ==
- (Wales) Mike Ruddock (head coach c. 1990)
- (Ireland) Harry Williams (head coach 1997-2001)
- (Ireland) Bernard Jackman (head coach 2019-2024)

== Notable persons ==
- Louis Magee; President of the IRFU 2014/2015
- Joe Nolan
