= Leinster Senior Cup (rugby union) =

The Leinster Senior Cup
Sport	Rugby union
Region	Leinster
Trophy	Leinster Challenge Cup
Established	1881
Inaugural winner	Dublin University
Most wins	Lansdowne (29)
Current season	2025-26
Date of final	13 September 2025
Venue of final	Energia Park (Donnybrook)
Current edition	139th
Current holder	Terenure College RFC
Match score	Terenure College RFC 29 - 21 Lansdowne RFC
Organising body	Leinster Rugby
Current sponsor	Bank of Ireland

The Leinster Senior Cup is a major rugby competition in Ireland, involving all senior rugby clubs in Leinster, i.e., clubs from Leinster competing in the All-Ireland League. From 2006 until 2016 it was known as the Leinster Senior League Cup during the period when the Leinster Senior League had been discontinued, but reverted to its traditional name for the 2016–17 season upon the revival of the Senior League. From 2011 to 2016 only the top senior teams competed and those in the lower divisions of the All-Ireland League competed for the Leinster Senior League Shield.

From 2023, the competition was restricted to teams in the First Division of the All-Ireland League, with the Senior League being for teams in the Second Division.

== History ==
=== The Inaugural Leinster Challenge Cup ===
The Leinster Challenge Cup competition was founded in the 1881–82 season. A meeting of the Leinster Branch of the Irish Rugby Football Union took place at John Lawrence's Rooms (Sports Outfitters) at 63 Grafton Street on Monday 31 October 1881. The meeting was chaired by William Joshua Goulding, Hon. President I.R.F.U. (1880–81) and was attended by representatives of Dundalk, Dublin University, Kingstown, Lansdowne, Phoenix, Rathmines School, and Wanderers Football Clubs. During the meeting questions were posed and answers given about the proposed All-Ireland Challenge Cup competition. Arising from this discussion, W.O. Neville (Dundalk proposed, seconded by H. Morrell (Dublin University), that a Leinster Challenge Cup be established to advance and encourage rugby football in Leinster. The Leinster Challenge Cup would be open to all clubs in Leinster affiliated to the Union. The meeting decided that a circular should be sent to all Leinster clubs inviting their participation and subscriptions to the Cup Fund. A further meeting of the Leinster Branch I.R.F.U. took place on Friday 11 November 1881 to consider the rules, dates of matches, drawing of rounds and other competition details. At this meeting a Challenge Cup Committee was formed. The closing date for entries to the inaugural Leinster Challenge Cup was set for Wednesday 30 November.

The Challenge Cup Committee - C.B. Croker (Lansdowne), the first Hon. Treasurer of the Leinster Branch, G. Drought (Phoenix), F. Kennedy (Wanderers), first Hon. Secretary of the Leinster Branch, E.A. McCarthy (Kingstown), H. Morrell (Dublin University) and Richard M. Peter (Dundalk) - meet on Thursday 1 December to draw up the ties. The Committee decided on an entry fee of ten shillings per club, that all clubs entering the competition should guarantee a donation to the Cup Fund of at least two guineas, that all matches were to be played at Lansdowne Road, that the ground was to be engaged for several matches and that the proceeds of a 6d (six penny) gate were to be added to the Cup Fund. Clubs were allowed to nominate their own umpires. The Committee proposed to purchase, if possible, a Challenge Cup costing some £50. Through the press, the Committee encouraged lovers of the noble game to attend matches and to support the Cup Fund.

The names of the five clubs which had entered, each of whom had guaranteed to donate £5 to the Cup Fund, were placed in a hat and drawn as follows: Match A: Dublin University v Phoenix, on the Wanderers Club portion of the Lansdowne Road grounds; Match B: Wanderers v Kingstown, on the Lansdowne Club portion of the grounds; Match C: Lansdowne, a bye. The first round ties were played on Saturday 10 December 1891, k.o. 2.45 pm, with two forty minute halves. The winner of Match A would play Lansdowne on Saturday 25 February 1882 for a place in the final. The Winner of Match B was to get a bye to the final, which would be played on Saturday 25 March 1882. The reasons for the long interval between the first and second rounds were Christmas holidays which extended into January and the International matches on 31 January (Wales), 7 February (England) and 14 February (Scotland). In the event of a Wanderers v Lansdowne meeting in the second round, the club captains would toss for choice of ground at Lansdowne Road. In the event of a draw at any stage, the Cup Committee would fix a date for a second match to be played, so as not to alter the existing rules of the game.

The first round matches resulted in a win for Dublin University (5 goals, 2 tries) over Phoenix (nil) - a goal equals a converted try, while the Wanderers v. Kingstown match was a scoreless draw. The Wanderers v Kingstown tie was replayed on Thursday 23 February 1882. Kingstown won by a goal and a try to nil. The second round match between Dublin University v Lansdowne resulted in a win for Trinity by 2 goals (1 converted try, 1 dropped goal) and 2 tries to nil. On 18 March, in the presence of one of the largest attendances of spectators that has ever been seen on the ground, the inaugural Leinster Challenge Cup Final between Dublin University v Kingstown was won by Trinity by one goal to nil and the title of the premier club of the province for the season. Both clubs were photographed before the match by Messrs Robinson of Grafton Street. The members of the winning team were presented with silver crosses. The reports on the match do not mention presentation of the Challenge Cup to the DUFC Captain. In celebration the Trinity students living in Botany Bay in College lit an enormous bonfire with a pyrotechnic display of fireworks. The Cup appears to have been first presented to the winning captain in 1883.

=== Leinster Senior Cup ===
From 1882 through 1897 newspaper reports refer to this competition consistently as 'The Leinster Challenge Cup'. From 1898 through 2006, press reports refer to the competition as 'The Leinster Senior Cup'. How and why did this change in title come about? The change in reference title probably had more to do with semantics rather than any change(s) in the rules governing the competition. At a General Meeting of the Leinster Branch of the I.R.F.U. held in the Wicklow Hotel on 11 November 1888, a resolution was adopted to inaugurate a Leinster Junior Cup competition on the same basis as applied to the Leinster Challenge Cup. Following the Hon. Treasurer's report to the Annual General Meeting a month earlier, it had been proposed that the Leinster Branch purchase a 'Challenge Cup' for such competition. At the Leinster Branch A.G.M in October 1891, a motion that the 2nd XVs of Senior Clubs be allowed to compete in the Leinster Junior Cup was rejected. Essentially the same motion returned the Leinster Branch AGM in October 1895, but was amended to refer the matter to a subcommittee to draft rules to govern the proposed competition under which the latter might be approved and discussion adjourned to the next General Meeting. At the reconvened meeting in November 1895, delegates were informed that the original motion had been withdrawn because of intense opposition. The meeting then reconstituted itself as a special meeting to consider a new resolution "that a Cup be presented by the Leinster Branch for competition amongst Second Fifteens of senior clubs on a league basis". After much discussion and consideration of umpteen amendments and counter proposals, the final phrase of the original motion was amended to read "amongst Junior Clubs and Second Fifteens of senior clubs on a league basis". This was passed unanimously. Thus the Leinster Branch I.R.F.U. from the 1886–87 season now had a Leinster Junior Cup, the winners of which received a Challenge Cup, a Junior League Cup for Junior Clubs and the 2nd XVs of Senior Clubs, and a Leinster Challenge Cup, contested by Senior Clubs. Thus, to avoid confusion in reports of competitions, the Leinster Challenge Cup became referred to as the Leinster Senior Cup, the winners of which were presented with the original Challenge Cup.

From 1940 to 1947 Old Belvedere completed the still unrivalled feat of winning the Leinster Senior Cup 7 consecutive times, narrowly losing their 8th consecutive final to Wanderers. This broke the next longest sequence of wins by Lansdowne from 1927 through 1931, who had broken the record of four consecutive wins by Dublin University from 1895 through 1898.

=== Leinster Senior League Cup ===
In recent times the competition declined in importance due to the introduction of the All-Ireland League in the 1990–91 season and the formation of a professional provincial team, Leinster, to compete in the Heineken Cup. Following the demise of the Leinster Senior League some time around 2006, the two competitions were combined as the Leinster Senior League Cup. From 2011-12 until 2015-16 senior teams from the lower divisions of the All-Ireland League have participated in the Leinster Senior League Shield instead of the League Cup. Thus competition inaugurated in 1882 continues to be contested by the strongest clubs in the province of Leinster. While the name of the competition has changed, the original Challenge Cup trophy is still presented.

The Leinster Senior League Cup competition has evolved over the past decade. In 2006-07 the top 8 teams of 20 in the league progressed to quarter-finals. From season 2007-08 through 2010-11 there were five Pools of four teams; within each Pool the teams played each other once. The winner of each Pool plus the best three runners-up from the five pools on points (and points scored for and against difference) qualified for the quarter-finals. In seasons 2011-12 and 2012-13 there were two Sections A and B, with the winners and runners-up in each section qualifying for the semi-finals. The winner of Section A played the Runner-up of Section B in the semi-final and vice versa. In season 2013-14 the winners of the two Sections qualified directly for the final. In seasons 2014-15 and 2015-16 there were three Sections A, B and C; within each Section the clubs played each other once. The winner of each Section and the best runner-up on points (and points scored for and against difference) progressed to the semi-finals.

=== Leinster Senior Cup ===
From 2016 to 2017, the Senior League was revived, and the Senior Cup reverted to a knock-out format.

The winners of the Leinster Senior League Cup compete with the other three provincial cup winners for the All-Ireland Cup.

== The Challenge Cup trophy ==
The report of the 1883 Leinster Challenge Cup final in the Irish Times contains a description of the Challenge Cup: The Cup, which is a solid silver, and is very massive, is in the Etruscan style. The body is elegantly ornamented in the highest style of the silversmith's art. On one side is a view of a football field and pavilion, showing a scrummage in full progress. On the top of the lid there is a beautifully modelled figure in correct football costume in the art of "dropping". The cup stands on a handsome ebony plinth, around which are slung on chains four massive silver shields on which to inscribe the names of the successful clubs. The work has been executed by Messrs Edmond Johnston of Grafton Street and is finished in the style for which the house has become so justly celebrated. Edmond Johnston achieved renown as a silversmith for two works in particular. He made the Liam MacCarthy All-Ireland Hurling Cup in 1921. He worked on the restoration of the Ardagh Chalice and was given permission to make replicas of it which were exhibited at the expositions in Chicago in 1893, Paris in 1900 and Glasgow in 1901. An EJ intertwined was his maker's mark.

== Leinster Challenge Cup ==
=== 1880s ===
- 1882 Dublin University 1 goal - nil Kingstown F.C.
- 1883 Dublin University 1 goal - nil Lansdowne (after replay)
- 1884 Dublin University 1 goal - nil Lansdowne
- 1885 Wanderers 1 try - nil Dublin University
- 1886 Dublin University 1 goal, 1 try to nil Lansdowne (after replay)
- 1887 Dublin University 2 goals - nil Wanderers (after replay & extra time)
- 1888 Wanderers 1 try - nil Dublin University(after replay)
- 1889 Bective Rangers 1 goal, 1 try - 1 goal Wanderers

=== 1890s ===
- 1890 Dublin University 1 goal, 1 try - nil Lansdowne
- 1891 Lansdowne 3 goals - nil Dublin University Football Club
- 1892 Bective Rangers 6 - 0 Wanderers
- 1893 Dublin University 3 - 0 Lansdowne
- 1894 Wanderers 5 - 0 Dublin University (after extra time)
- 1895 Dublin University 15 - 0 Bective Rangers
- 1896 Dublin University 3 - 0 Old Wesley
- 1897 Dublin University 5 - 0 Old Wesley

== Leinster Senior Cup ==
=== 1890s ===
- 1898 Dublin University 16 - 0 Lansdowne
- 1899 Monkstown 8 - 0 Lansdowne

=== 1900s ===
- 1900 Dublin University 15 - 0 Wanderers
- 1901 Lansdowne 8 - 3 Dublin University
- 1902 Monkstown 3 - 0 Lansdowne
- 1903 Lansdowne 5 - 3 Dublin University
- 1904 Lansdowne 5 - 3 Clontarf
- 1905 Dublin University 22 - 11 Lansdowne
- 1906 Wanderers 3 - 0 Monkstown
- 1907 Dublin University 18 - 3 Wanderers
- 1908 Dublin University 8 - 6 Old Wesley
- 1909 Old Wesley 20 - 0 Blackrock College

=== 1910s ===
- 1910 Bective Rangers 5 - 3 Wanderers
- 1911 Wanderers 9 - 0 Bective Rangers
- 1912 Dublin University 3 - 0 Bective Rangers
- 1913 Dublin University 10 - 3 Bective Rangers
- 1914 Bective Rangers 11 - 6 Dublin University
- 1915 No competition - World War I
- 1916 No competition - World War I
- 1917 No competition - World War I
- 1918 No competition - World War I
- 1919 No competition - World War I

=== 1920s ===
- 1920 Dublin University 5 - 0 Wanderers
- 1921 Dublin University 5 - 0 UCD
- 1922 Lansdowne 15 - 5 Monkstown
- 1923 Bective Rangers 18 - 0 UCD
- 1924 UCD 12 - 3 Monkstown
- 1925 Bective Rangers 3 - 0 UCD
- 1926 Dublin University 11 - 3 UCD
- 1927 Lansdowne 8 - 0 Dublin University
- 1928 Lansdowne 13 - 0 Blackrock College
- 1929 Lansdowne 45 - 0 Monkstown

=== 1930s ===
- 1930 Lansdowne 9 - 0 Bective Rangers
- 1931 Lansdowne 17 - 5 Wanderers
- 1932 Bective Rangers 11 - 3 UCD
- 1933 Lansdowne 6 - 4 UCD
- 1934 Bective Rangers 8 - 3 Blackrock College
- 1935 Bective Rangers 10 - 6 Dublin University
- 1936 Clontarf 16 - 8 Blackrock College
- 1937 Blackrock College 9 - 8 Clontarf
- 1938 UCD 5 - 3 Clontarf
- 1939 Blackrock College 17 - 3 Clontarf

=== 1940s ===
- 1940 Old Belvedere 9 - 0 Clontarf
- 1941 Old Belvedere 3 - 0 Blackrock College (after replay)
- 1942 Old Belvedere 11 - 0 Wanderers (after replay)
- 1943 Old Belvedere 7 - 3 UCD
- 1944 Old Belvedere 6 - 3 UCD
- 1945 Old Belvedere 12 - 10 Clontarf
- 1946 Old Belvedere 16 - 11 UCD
- 1947 Wanderers 8 - 4 Old Belvedere
- 1948 UCD 4 - 0 Dublin University
- 1949 Lansdowne 11 - 9 Old Belvedere

=== 1950s ===
- 1950 Lansdowne 6 - 0 UCD
- 1951 Old Belvedere beat Dublin University
- 1952 Old Belvedere beat Old Wesley
- 1953 Lansdowne 16 - 3 Wanderers
- 1954 Wanderers 15 - 12 Lansdowne (after replay)
- 1955 Bective Rangers beat Old Belvedere
- 1956 Bective Rangers beat Lansdowne
- 1957 Blackrock College beat Clontarf
- 1958 St. Mary's College beat Blackrock College
- 1959 Wanderers 13 - 6 Lansdowne

=== 1960s ===
- 1960 Dublin University 14 - 11 St. Mary's College (after replay)
- 1961 Blackrock College 8 - 6 UCD (after replay)
- 1962 Bective Rangers 19- 6 Wanderers
- 1963 UCD 12 - 3 St. Mary's College
- 1964 UCD 11 - 6 Bective Rangers
- 1965 Lansdowne 9 - 6 Clontarf
- 1966 Terenure College 11 - 8 St. Mary's College
- 1967 Terenure College 6 - 5 UCD
- 1968 Old Belvedere 11 - 6 UCD
- 1969 St. Mary's College 14 - 11 Dublin University (after replay)

=== 1970s ===
- 1970 UCD 14 - 3 Terenure College
- 1971 St. Mary's College beat UCD
- 1972 Lansdowne 16 - 10 UCD
- 1973 Wanderers 13 - 10 St. Mary's College
- 1974 St. Mary's College 9 - 3 Bective Rangers
- 1975 St. Mary's College 10 - 9 Old Wesley (after replay)
- 1976 Dublin University 10 - 6 Blackrock College (replay, extra time)
- 1977 UCD 9 - 6 Terenure College
- 1978 Wanderers 9 - 4 UCD
- 1979 Lansdowne 24 - 3 Terenure College

=== 1980s ===
- 1980 Lansdowne 16 - 4 Blackrock College
- 1981 Lansdowne 7 - 6 Old Belvedere
- 1982 Wanderers 12 - 0 Bective Rangers (after replay)
- 1983 Blackrock College 13 - 6 Greystones
- 1984 Wanderers 29 - 4 UCD
- 1985 Old Wesley 13 - 6 Wanderers
- 1986 Lansdowne 15 - 9 Blackrock College
- 1987 St. Mary's College 13 - 12 Lansdowne
- 1988 Blackrock College 12 - 6 Dublin University
- 1989 Lansdowne 29 - 0 Terenure College

=== 1990s ===
- 1990 Wanderers 9 - 3 Monkstown
- 1991 Lansdowne 13 - 9 Terenure College
- 1992 Blackrock College 12 - 6 Old Wesley
- 1993 St. Mary's College 12 - 6 Old Wesley
- 1994 Terenure College 12 - 8 Greystones
- 1995 St. Mary's College 29 - 3 Greystones
- 1996 Terenure College 17 - 7 Lansdowne
- 1997 Lansdowne 40 - 8 Bective Rangers
- 1998 Lansdowne 23 - 17 Skerries
- 1999 Clontarf beat DLS Palmerston

=== 2000s ===
- 1999-00 Blackrock College 23 - 12 Old Belvedere
- 2000-01 Terenure College 38 - 7 Clontarf
- 2001-02 Clontarf 18 - 3 County Carlow
- 2002-03 County Carlow 23 - 11 DLS Palmerston
- 2003-04 County Carlow 23 - 19 DLS Palmerston
- 2004-05 St. Mary's College 26 - 7 DLS Palmerston
- 2005-06 Clontarf 23 - 16 St. Mary's College

== Leinster Senior League Cup ==
=== 2000s ===
- 2006-07 Old Belvedere 19 - 16 Clontarf
- 2007-08 Clontarf 9 - 6 St. Mary's College
- 2008-09 Lansdowne 9 - 5 Clontarf

=== 2010s ===
- 2009-10 St. Mary's College 9 - 3 Old Belvedere
- 2010-11 UCD 24 - 23 St. Mary's College
- 2011-12 Old Belvedere 16 - 3 Blackrock College
- 2012-13 St. Mary's College 32 - 20 Lansdowne
- 2013-14 UCD 23 - 18 Terenure College
- 2014-15 Clontarf 32 - 28 UCD
- 2015-16 UCD 23 - 13 Old Belvedere

== Leinster Senior Cup ==
=== 2010s ===
- 2016-17 Lansdowne 33 - 26 Old Belvedere
- 2017-18 Lansdowne 53 - 22 Terenure College
- 2018-19 Lansdowne 49 - 22 Dublin University

=== 2020s ===
- 2019-20 UCD 22 - 19 Clontarf
- 2020-21 Not held because of COVID-19 restrictions
- 2021-22 Terenure College 20 - 18 Lansdowne
- 2022-23 Terenure College 50 - 24 Clontarf
- 2023-24 Lansdowne 45 - 44 Terenure College
- 2024-25 Clontarf 19 - 17 Lansdowne
- 2025-26 Terenure College 29 - 21 Lansdowne
- 2026-27 Lansdowne 36 - 19 St Mary's College

== Club statistics ==
Club	Wins	First win	Last win	No. finals	% win	First final	Last final
Lansdowne	29	1882-83	2023-24	47	61.7%	1882-83	2025-26
Dublin University	22	1882	1988	36	61.1%	1882	2018-19
Wanderers	13	1885	1990	25	52.0%	1885	1990
Old Belvedere	12	1939-40	2011-12	20	60.0%	1939-40	2016-17
Bective Rangers	12	1889	1962	21	57.1%	1889	1997
St Mary's College	11	1958	2012-13	18	61.1%	1958	2012-13
UCD	11	1923-24	2019-20	29	37.9%	1920-21	2019-20
Blackrock College	8	1937	1999-00	18	44.4%	1909	2011-12
Terenure College	8	1965-66	2025-26	16	50%	1965-66	2025-26
Clontarf	7	1935-36	2024-25	20	31.6&	1903-04	2024-25
County Carlow	2	2002-03	2003-04	3	66.7%	2001-02	2003-04
Monkstown	2	1899	1902	7	28.6%	1899	1990
Old Wesley	2	1909	1985	9	22.2%	1896	1993
DLS Palmerston	0	–	–	4	0.0%	1999	2004-05
Greystones	0	–	–	3	0.0%	1983	1995
Skerries	0	–	–	1	0.0%	1998	1998
Kingstown FC	0	–	–	1	0.0%	1882	1882
Totals	139	–	–	278	–	1881-82	2025-26

== See also ==
- Connacht Senior Cup
- Munster Senior Cup
- Ulster Senior Cup
