= Leinster League Division One =

First rugby division of the Leinster League

- Founded: 1994
- No. of teams: 14
- Country: Ireland
- Most recent champion: Cill Dara RFC (2007–08)
- Relegation to: Leinster League Division Two

Leinster League Division One, as the name implies, is the first division of the Leinster League and started in the 1994/95 season.

Suttonians, Co. Carlow, Arklow, Mullingar, Garda, Navan, Naas, Wexford Wanderers, Portlaoise, Dundalk and Enniscorthy entered the division through the qualifying matches in the 1993/1994 season.

The number of teams in the division was reduced from 14 to 12 in the 2007/08 season, but this was reversed in the 2008/09 season.

== 2008/2009 Season ==
- Boyne
- Cill Dara
- Dundalk
- Enniscorthy
- Garda
- Monkstown
- Navan
- Newbridge
- Portlaoise
- Seapoint
- Skerries
- Tullamore
- Tullow
- Wicklow

=== 2008/2009 Table ===
2008–2009 Leinster League Division One League Table
Club	Played	Won	Drawn	Lost	Points for	Points against	Points difference	Bonus Points	Points
Navan	7	7	0	0	219	31	188	3	31
Seapoint	7	6	0	1	141	71	70	2	26
Monkstown	7	6	0	1	148	52	96	2	26
Skerries	7	5	0	2	203	88	115	5	25
Boyne	7	5	0	2	134	98	36	2	22
Dundalk	7	5	0	2	121	87	34	2	22
Cill Dara	7	4	1	2	196	85	4	22	
Tullamore	7	4	0	3	152	72	80	4	20
Portlaoise	6	2	0	4	106	109	−3	4	12
Garda	7	2	0	5	71	171	−101	0	8
Tullow	7	1	1	5	76	160	−84	2	8
Enniscorthy	6	0	0	6	83	158	−75	3	3
Newbridge	7	0	0	7	71	238	−167	1	1
Wicklow	7	0	0	7	31	305	−274	1	1
Correct as of 19 November 2008

== 2007/2008 Season ==
- Ashbourne
- Boyne
- Cill Dara
- Dundalk
- Garda
- Monkstown
- Navan
- Portlaoise
- Seapoint
- Skerries
- Tullamore
- Wicklow

At the end of the season, Ashbourne were relegated to Division Two and Enniscorthy, Newbridge and Tullow were promoted, making it 14 teams once again for 2008/2009.

=== 2007/2008 Table ===
2008–2009 Leinster League Division One League Table
Club	Played	Won	Drawn	Lost	Points for	Points against	Points difference	Bonus Points	Points
Cill Dara	11	10	1	0	279	183	96	4	46
Seapoint	11	9	2	0	329	97	232	4	44
Navan	11	8	1	2	247	111	136	4	38
Tullamore	11	6	1	4	202	177	25	3	29
Dundalk	11	5	0	6	186	164	26	5	25
Portlaoise	11	4	1	6	184	248	−64	5	23
Monkstown	11	4	1	6	136	221	−85	2	20
Boyne	11	4	0	7	175	255	−80	4	20
Garda	11	4	1	6	163	230	−67	1	19
Skerries	11	3	0	8	127	170	−43	5	17
Wicklow	11	3	1	7	121	223	−102	3	17
Ashbourne	11	1	1	9	110	180	−70	4	10
Correct as of 3 March 2008

== 2006/2007 Season ==
- Boyne
- Cill Dara
- Dundalk
- Enniscorthy
- Garda
- Kilkenny
- Monkstown
- Mullingar
- Naas
- Navan
- Portlaoise
- Seapoint
- Skerries
- Tullamore

At the end of the season, Mullingar, Enniscorthy and Kilkenny were relegated to Division Two and Ashbourne and Wicklow were promoted. Naas won promotion to AIB Division Three.

=== 2006/2007 Table ===
2006–2007 Leinster League Division One League Table
Club	Played	Won	Drawn	Lost	Points for	Points against	Points difference	Bonus Points	Points
Naas	13	12	0	1	364	141	223	9	57
Seapoint	13	10	0	3	335	156	179	8	48
Navan	13	10	0	3	357	266	91	7	47
Tullamore	13	8	1	4	209	206	3	3	37
Boyne	13	7	1	5	238	207	31	5	35
Cill Dara	13	7	0	6	187	194	−7	5	33
Skerries	13	6	0	7	191	286	−95	5	29
Garda	13	5	0	8	191	215	−24	5	25
Portlaoise	13	4	1	8	184	196	−12	6	24
Monkstown	13	4	0	9	220	228	−8	7	23
Dundalk	13	4	0	9	215	234	−19	6	22
Mullingar	13	5	0	8	189	326	−137	−1	19
Enniscorthy	13	4	0	9	154	243	−89	3	19
Kilkenny	13	3	1	9	129	165	−136	1	15
Correct as of 21 November 2007

== Past winners ==
- 1994/1995 Dundalk
- 1995/1996 Suttonians
- 1996/1997 Co Carlow
- 1997/1998 Naas
- 1998/1999 Barnhall
- 1999/2000 Naas
- 2000/2001 Navan
- 2001/2002 Kilkenny
- 2002/2003 Kilkenny
- 2003/2004 Seapoint RFC
- 2004/2005 Naas
- 2005/2006 Monkstown
- 2006/2007 Naas
- 2007/2008 Cill Dara
- 2008/2009 Navan
- 2009/2010 Seapoint RFC

== Wins by club ==
- Naas (4 times)
- Kilkenny (twice)
- Navan (Twice)
- Seapoint RFC (Twice)
- Barnhall (once)
- Cill Dara (once)
- Co Carlow (once)
- Dundalk (once)
- Monkstown (once)
- Suttonians (once)
