= Athy RFC =

Rugby union club in Athy, County Kildare, Ireland

(Republic of Ireland) Athy
- Full name: Athy Rugby Football Club
- Union: (Republic of Ireland) IRFU
- Branch: Leinster
- Founded: 1880; 146 years ago
- Location: Athy, County Kildare, Ireland
- Region: South Kildare
- Ground(s): The Showgrounds, Athy
- President: Leslie O'Mara
- Coach: Phil De Barra
- Captain: Craig Miller
- League(s): Leinster League, Division 1A
Team kit

Athy Rugby Football Club (Athy RFC) is an amateur rugby union club based in Athy, County Kildare, Ireland. Founded during the 1879–80 season, it is one of the oldest rugby clubs in Ireland. The club is affiliated to the Leinster Branch of the Irish Rugby Football Union and plays its home games at The Showgrounds, Athy, which has been its home since the club was re-established in 1924. Its senior men's team competes in Division 1A, the top division of the Leinster League, and the club also fields women's, youth and mini rugby teams.

Athy has been closely linked with the Provincial Towns Cup since entering the first edition of its forerunner competition in 1889, and has won the trophy seven times, including back-to-back titles in 2025 and 2026. Players who began their rugby at the club include Ireland internationals Joey Carbery and Jeremy Loughman, former Leinster flanker Martin Moloney and Olympic sevens player Amy Larn.

== History ==
=== Foundation and early years ===
Athy RFC was formed in the 1879–80 season. Records from the club's first decades are sparse, but W. C. Taylor and R. Anderson are listed among its founding members, and the Anderson family has remained involved with the club into the 21st century. A report in the publication Sport in January 1880 remarked on the sociable post-match gatherings that followed Athy's home fixtures.

In 1889 Athy was one of eight clubs to enter the inaugural Leinster Junior Challenge Cup, alongside Blackrock College, Clontarf, Cabra, Rangers, Claremont, Farra and Santry, and was one of five clubs that helped to fund the competition in its first year. The trophy, purchased in 1892, was later restricted to junior clubs based outside Dublin and renamed the Provincial Towns Cup in the mid-1920s.

The club remained active until shortly before the First World War, when it lapsed. In the years that followed, a number of rugby players from the Athy district played for neighbouring Carlow.

=== Re-formation and The Showgrounds ===
The club's revival traced back to a 1920 match in which Carlow were beaten by Enniscorthy. At the dinner afterwards, the defeat was blamed on three Athy-based players in the Carlow side: R. H. Anderson, Charles K. Duncan and W. O. Taylor. In response, a team was raised in Athy under Taylor's captaincy and beat Carlow twice, 6–3 in Carlow and 26–3 in Athy. Carlow officials then persuaded Taylor not to form a separate club, arguing that two clubs in neighbouring towns would weaken both.

Athy RFC was nonetheless formally re-established at a meeting in the Leinster Arms Hotel in the late summer of 1924. The local agricultural show committee allowed a pitch to be laid out inside the jumping enclosure of the Showgrounds, on condition that the show jumps were not moved. To fit a full-size pitch in the available space, it was set at a 45-degree angle to the boundary fences; visiting teams nicknamed it the "crooked grounds", and the awkward angles were regarded as an advantage for the home side. The Showgrounds has remained the club's home ever since. For a short period in the 1920s the team was known as the Athy "Atoms".

=== Provincial Towns Cup tradition ===
After re-forming, Athy became one of the stronger provincial clubs in Leinster. Having reached the semi-final in 1926–27, the club lost three consecutive Provincial Towns Cup finals between 1928 and 1930, to Balbriggan, Carlow and Wexford Wanderers. Athy won the cup for the first time in the 1937–38 season, beating Dundalk 6–5 at Lansdowne Road, and won it again in 1939–40 with a 12–3 win over the same opponents.

Further finals followed in 1943, 1948, 1962, 1965 and 1977, all ending in defeat; the last of these, a 9–6 loss to Carlow, was the first Towns Cup final hosted at a participating club's ground. Athy won the cup again in 1978, beating Curragh 14–9 in Dundalk under the captaincy of J. Miller, and a week later defeated Metropolitan Cup winners St Mary's College to take the President's Plaque.

The years between 1977 and 1984 were the club's most successful period in the competition, with five finals and three titles. Athy beat Carlow 8–3 in 1981, lost 6–3 to Edenderry in 1983, and beat Portlaoise 13–6 in Roscrea in 1984. The club reached one further final in 1991, losing 34–15 to Navan at the Curragh, and did not return to the decider for another 34 years.

=== Contributions to provincial rugby ===
Members of the club have donated several trophies to Leinster competitions. Bill Hosie of Athy presented the Hosie Cup to the North Midlands Area in 1966 for a Junior 1 competition, and in 1970 the Anderson family presented the Anderson Cup to the Leinster Branch for a provincial Junior 3 competition. The club also donated the Speirs Cup, a Junior 3 trophy contested within the North Midlands Area, and hosted the 50th Hosie Cup final in 2016.

== Present day ==
=== Leinster League ===
Athy rose through the divisions of the Leinster League in the late 2010s and early 2020s, winning three promotions in four seasons to reach Division 1A for the first time in 2024–25. After losing their first three matches in the top division, the team finished fifth. The 2025–26 league campaign proved more difficult, with Athy involved in a fight against relegation before retaining their place; 2026–27 is the club's third consecutive season in Division 1A.

=== Return to Towns Cup success ===
In 2025 Athy ended a 41-year wait for the Provincial Towns Cup. Victories over New Ross (34–17), Dundalk (24–11) and two-time defending champions Tullow (39–33) set up a final against County Carlow, the fifth meeting of the two clubs in a Towns Cup final. Played at the home of Naas RFC on 27 April 2025, the final finished 18–17 to Athy, with tries from David Downey, Jack Henry and Cathal Fennessy and a decisive second-half penalty from Darragh Farrell.

Athy's fifth-place league finish, combined with the promotion of Division 1A champions Bective Rangers to the All-Ireland League, earned the club a place in the All-Ireland Junior Cup for the first time in 2025–26, as Leinster's fourth representative. Athy beat Tuam 47–14 in Galway and then Suttonians 41–10 at The Showgrounds, scoring 38 unanswered points after trailing at half-time, before losing to Seapoint in the semi-final in December 2025. The Kildare Nationalist described 2025 as arguably the most successful year in the club's history.

On 19 April 2026 Athy retained the Provincial Towns Cup, beating Tullow 41–26 in the final at Edenderry RFC. Winger Ciaran Fennessy scored a hat-trick as Athy built a 27–0 half-time lead on the way to the club's seventh title. This final success followed on from earlier wins over Navan (57–10), Wexford (36–30), and Longford (48–12) in the semi final. The 2026–27 season opened with another trophy, as Athy beat Suttonians to win the Colm O'Shea Cup, a season curtain-raiser between the holders of the Provincial Towns Cup and the Metropolitan Cup.

=== Club structure ===
As of 2023, the club fielded three senior men's teams and a senior women's team, along with boys' and girls' teams from under-7 to under-18 level and mixed mini rugby sections. Several of its youth players have represented Leinster and Ireland at underage level. The club's colours are royal blue and white hooped jerseys, white shorts, and royal blue and white hooped socks.

== Honours ==
=== Men ===
- Provincial Towns Cup (7): 1938, 1940, 1978, 1981, 1984, 2025, 2026
  - Runners-up (10): 1928, 1929, 1930, 1943, 1948, 1962, 1965, 1977, 1983, 1991
- Leinster President's Plaque (1): 1978
- Colm O'Shea Cup (1): 2026
- North Midlands Hosie Cup (7): 1972, 1979, 1980, 1988, 2022, 2023, 2024
- Leinster League Division 2A (1): 2021–22
- Leinster League Division 2B (1): 2019–20
- Provincial Towns Plate (2): 1982, 2024

=== Women ===
- Leinster Paul Cusack Women's Plate (1): 2024

== Notable players ==
The following players came through Athy RFC's youth sections and went on to play senior rugby for Ireland or Leinster.

Player	Senior teams	Notes
Joey Carbery	Ireland, Leinster, Munster, Bordeaux Bègles	Fly-half and the fourth generation of his family to play for the club. Made his Ireland debut against New Zealand in November 2016, and returned to Leinster for the 2026–27 season after two seasons in France.
Jeremy Loughman	Ireland, Munster	Loosehead prop who played on the same Athy underage team as Carbery. Won his first Ireland cap against Fiji in November 2022 and featured at the 2023 Rugby World Cup.
Martin Moloney	Leinster, Exeter Chiefs	Flanker who made 11 senior appearances for Leinster between 2021 and 2024, having debuted against Munster, and won an Under-20 Six Nations Grand Slam with Ireland in 2019.
Amy Larn	Ireland Sevens	Played all of her underage rugby with Athy before joining the Ireland sevens programme, and was part of Ireland's squad at the 2024 Summer Olympics.

== See also ==
- Leinster Towns Cup
- Leinster League
