= IRFU Women's Interprovincial Series =

Irish rugby union competition

- Current season or competition: 2026 IRFU Women's Interprovincial Series
- Sport: Women's rugby union
- Number of teams: 4
- Province: Connacht; Leinster; Munster; Ulster
- Holders: Munster (17th title)
- Most titles: Munster (17 titles)
- Website: www.irishrugby.ie

Location of IRFU Women's Interprovincial Series Provinces:
Republic of Ireland Northern Ireland

The IRFU Women's Interprovincial Series, previously known as the IWRFU Interprovincial Championship, is the top level women's rugby union competition in Ireland. It is organised by the Irish Rugby Football Union. It is the women's equivalent of the former IRFU Interprovincial Championship.

The competition takes place every December and features four teams representing Connacht, Leinster, Munster and Ulster. The competition effectively acts as a selection trials process for both the Celtic Challenge regional cross-border competition featuring the Wolfhounds and Clovers teams, and the Ireland women's national rugby union team that competes in the subsequent Women's Six Nations Championship.

Since 2016 the IRFU has also organised a similar under 18s competition.

== Format ==
The competition has historically used a round-robin format, similar to the one used in both the Six Nations Championship and the Women's Six Nations Championship. Each team playing the other three teams once. The following year the fixtures are reversed.

In recent seasons, the competition has also featured playoffs, consisting of a third-place playoff or minor final, and a final

== Winners ==
Year	Winner	Final	Runner-up	Venue
1996-97	Connacht	29-5	Ulster	Ashbourne RFC
1997-98	Connacht		(round-robin)	Galway
1998-99	(Ireland) Irish Exiles	12-3	Ulster	Cooke RFC
1999-2000	Ulster		(round-robin)	
2000-01	Ulster		Munster	
2001-02	Munster		Ulster	
2002-03	Munster	27-00	Leinster	Clonmel RFC
2003-04	Munster	25-10	Leinster	Navan R.F.C.
2004-05	Munster	10-10^	Leinster	Clontarf F.C.
2005-06	Leinster	17–07	Munster	Clontarf F.C.
2006-07	Munster	11–10	Leinster	Musgrave Park, Cork
2007-08	Munster	11–10	Leinster	Galway Sportsgrounds
2008-09	Munster	10–05	Leinster	Civil Service Sports Club, Belfast
2009-10	Munster	09-06	Leinster	Donnybrook Stadium
2010-11	Munster	21-03	Leinster	Donnybrook Stadium
2011-12	Leinster	25-05	Munster	Highfield R.F.C.
2012-13	Munster	15-12	Leinster	Ashbourne RFC
2013-14	Leinster	21-06	Munster	Thomond Park
2014-15	Munster	07-00	Leinster	Ashbourne RFC
2015-16	Munster	15-07	Leinster	Thomond Park
2016-17	Leinster	05-08^^	Connacht	Tuam RFC
2017-18	Munster	11-05	Leinster	Thomond Park
2018-19	Leinster	14-14^*	Munster	Donnybrook Stadium
2019-20	Leinster	25-12	Connacht	Donnybrook Stadium
2020-21	Cancelled due to COVID-19			
2021-22	Munster	19-07	Leinster	Donnybrook Stadium
2022-23	Munster		Leinster	round-robin
2023-24	Leinster	33-14	Munster	Musgrave Park
2024-25	Leinster	27-07	Munster	Kingspan Stadium
2025-26	Munster	50–15	Leinster	Donnybrook Stadium
2026-27	Munster	14–05	Leinster	Dexcom Stadium

^ Munster win title due to superior points table difference

^^ Both sides finished the campaign with two wins and a loss but Leinster's superior scoring difference +52 during round-robin (Connaught's +26)

^* Both sides finished the campaign with two wins and a draw but Leinster's superior scoring difference +64 during round-robin (Munster's +37)

=== All-time record ===
Although Ulster won the first two championships, the competition has habitually been dominated by Munster and Leinster, with the former winning 16 titles and the latter eight. Connacht have yet to win the competition, although they have finished as runners up twice in late 2010s.

Province	Titles	Runners-up	Years
Munster Rugby	17	6	2001, 2002, 2003, 2004, 2006, 2007, 2008, 2009, 2010, 2012, 2014, 2015, 2017, 2021-2022, 2022-2023, 2025, 2026
Leinster Rugby	8	16	2005, 2011, 2013, 2016, 2018, 2019, 2023-2024, 2024-2025
Ulster Rugby	2	1	1999, 2000
Connacht Rugby	-	2	-
