= Leinster Towns Cup =

Rugby union cup competition in Leinster, Ireland

Provincial Towns Cup
- Bank of Ireland Provincial Towns Cup
- Sport: Rugby union
- Formerly: Leinster Junior Challenge Cup (1888–1925)
- First final: 1926
- Organiser: Leinster Branch, IRFU
- Region: Leinster (outside the Dublin metropolitan area)
- Teams: 27 (2026)
- Current champions: Athy (7th title)
- Most titles: County Carlow (12 titles)
- Sponsor: Bank of Ireland

The Provincial Towns Cup (also known as the Leinster Towns Cup, and currently the Bank of Ireland Provincial Towns Cup for sponsorship reasons) is an annual rugby union knock-out competition for junior clubs in Leinster based outside Dublin. It is organised by the Leinster Branch of the Irish Rugby Football Union (IRFU).

The competition traces its history to the Leinster Junior Challenge Cup, established in 1888, and its trophy is one of the oldest in Irish rugby union. The Junior Cup was reorganised as the Provincial Towns Cup in 1925, and the first final under the new name was played in 1926. The IRFU has described it as the leading event in provincial rugby in Leinster.

Twenty-four clubs have won the cup. County Carlow hold the record for the most titles, with 12. The current champions are Athy, who won the 2025 and 2026 finals.

== History ==
=== Leinster Junior Challenge Cup (1888–1925) ===
The Provincial Towns Cup grew out of the Leinster Junior Challenge Cup. At its annual general meeting in October 1888, the Leinster Branch heard a proposal that it should buy a challenge cup for a junior competition, and at a general meeting in the Wicklow Hotel, Dublin, on 11 November 1888 it resolved to start a Leinster Junior Cup run along the same lines as the senior Leinster Challenge Cup. The first final was played in 1889. The competition was intended for clubs below senior level, and in October 1891 the Branch voted down a motion that would have allowed the second XVs of senior clubs to take part.

The trophy that is still used today was bought in 1892 and presented for the first time that year to Blackrock College. Provincial clubs also won the Junior Cup during this period, among them County Carlow in 1913 and Kilkenny in 1920. The Junior Cup was contested over 32 seasons up to 1925; no competition was held from 1915 to 1919 because of the First World War.

=== Establishment and early years (1926–1945) ===
In 1925 the Leinster Branch reorganised its junior competitions, and the Junior Challenge Cup became the Provincial Towns Cup, a knock-out competition for junior clubs from outside Dublin, with the old trophy passed on to the new competition. The first final was played at Donnybrook in 1926, when Enniscorthy beat County Kildare (Naas) 6–0. The winning side was captained by the great-grandfather of Killian Lett, who would himself captain Enniscorthy to the cup in 2015.

Enniscorthy retained the title in 1927 against Balbriggan, the first club from the north-east of the province to reach a final. Balbriggan won the cup the following year, beating Athy after a replay; their side included W. J. McCormick, who went on to win a cap for Ireland against England in 1930. Athy lost three finals in a row between 1928 and 1930, while County Carlow won the first of their record 12 titles in 1929 and added two more in 1931 and 1933.

In the mid-1930s the most prominent side in the competition was Shannon Buccaneers, an Athlone club founded in the early 1930s by Diarmuid Murtagh, whose players included Walter Amos and the British and Irish Lion Sammy Walker. The Buccaneers reached five finals between 1934 and 1939, winning in 1935 and 1936, but the outbreak of the Second World War effectively brought the club to an end. Its name was later revived by Buccaneers RFC.

Dundalk won three titles in the 1930s, in 1932, 1937 and 1939, and contested three successive finals against Athy and the Buccaneers between 1938 and 1940. Athy's first title came in 1938 with a 6–5 win over Dundalk; Dundalk won in 1939, and Athy beat them again in the 1940 final.

Skerries, founded in 1926, won their first Towns Cup in 1941 under captain Joey Sherwin, defeating Wexford Wanderers 7–5 at Lansdowne Road. By 1944 they had won the trophy three times, beating a Curragh second team 17–0 in that year's final, also at Lansdowne Road. The Curragh club had won its first title in 1942.

=== Post-war years (1946–1969) ===
Tullamore won their first title in 1946, beating Skerries in the final. Dundalk then won four finals in five years between 1945 and 1949, after which they would wait 21 years for another title. Skerries completed a hat-trick of wins from 1950 to 1952, the first of them after a replay against Rathdowney.

The 1950s and 1960s saw the cup shared more widely. North Kildare (1953 and 1958) and Mullingar (1954 and 1956) won their only titles in this period, and Kilkenny won the cup for the first time in 1955, after a replay against North Kildare. County Carlow added three more titles, in 1957, 1961 and 1965. In 1962 Delvin, a club founded in 1953, beat Athy 12–0 in the final at Tullamore. Navan won their first title in 1964, again after a replay, and had won the cup three times by the end of the decade. The Curragh won their second title in 1967, and Edenderry won for the first time in 1969.

=== Skerries' four in a row (1970–1989) ===
Dundalk ended their 21-year wait in April 1970, beating Navan in a final played in Drogheda. Captained by Vinny McGee, their side included Eamonn McGuire, who had won eight caps for Ireland. Dundalk had beaten Skerries in the first round that year, but Skerries then won the next four finals, from 1971 to 1974, a run no other club has matched. In the 1973 final against North Kildare, full-back Colm Sherlock kicked four penalties to give Skerries a 12–11 win over a side that had scored two tries, and he captained the team to the fourth title in 1974. The same Skerries side qualified for the Leinster Senior Cup through the McGowan Cup, and in 1975 became the first junior club to beat a senior club in that competition, defeating Dublin University. Skerries' eleventh and most recent title came in 1979.

Roscrea won the cup in 1975 and 1980, both times by a single point. Athy enjoyed a golden era in the late 1970s and early 1980s, reaching nine semi-finals and five finals in a decade. After losing to County Carlow in 1977, they won the cup in 1978, 1981 and 1984, the last with a win over Portlaoise in a final played at Roscrea. Portlaoise won their first title in 1982, and Edenderry their second in 1983. Arklow took their first title in 1985 at the expense of Drogheda, who lost all four of the finals they contested between 1967 and 1985. Kilkenny won in 1986, and in 1987 they were captained in the final by the former Ireland international Willie Duggan, losing to Dundalk. Navan won in 1988.

=== County Carlow's dominance (1990–1999) ===
Navan won back-to-back titles in 1990 and 1991, the first by a single point against County Carlow. Carlow then dominated the decade, winning five titles in six years between 1992 and 1997; the exception was 1995, when they lost in the semi-finals to Naas, who went on to lift the cup. Carlow's finals regularly drew crowds of more than 5,000, and as many as 7,000 were estimated to have watched them beat Tullamore 20–15 in the 1994 final at Tullow's Black Gates ground. Their fifth title of the decade came with a 21–3 win over Navan at Naas in 1997, the same season in which they qualified for the All-Ireland League and left the junior ranks. In 2003 they won the Leinster Senior Cup, becoming the only club to have won both that competition and the Provincial Towns Cup.

Naas won the cup in 1995 and again in 1998, and Navan beat Ashbourne in the 1999 final.

=== 2000–2019 ===
Navan retained their title in 2000, and Kilkenny won back-to-back titles in 2001 and 2002. In 2002 Kilkenny also won the South East League and, for the first time, the Leinster League. Portlaoise (2003), Arklow (2004), Naas (2005) and Tullamore (2006) all won the cup before Navan took back-to-back titles in 2007 and 2008, bringing their total to ten. Navan also won the All-Ireland Junior Cup in 2008, and gained senior status the following year.

The 2009 final, the 84th, brought together Tullamore, who had just won the All-Ireland Junior Cup and were chasing a double, and Boyne, a club formed in 1997 by the merger of Drogheda and Delvin. Boyne won 27–21 at Ashbourne for their first title and beat Tullamore again in the 2010 final. Tullamore also lost the 2011 final, to Dundalk, before winning the cup in 2013. Boyne followed Navan into senior rugby in 2011, as did Skerries in 2012 and Dundalk in 2015.

Enniscorthy were the most successful side of the 2010s, winning four titles in eight seasons. In 2015 their captain, Killian Lett, lifted the cup after Ivan Poole kicked a late penalty to beat Kilkenny 9–8 at Cill Dara, and in 2019 they retained the trophy with a 10–9 win over Wicklow at Navan's Balreask Old ground. The decade also produced three first-time winners. Ashbourne beat Kilkenny 6–3 in 2014, Wicklow beat Enniscorthy in 2016, and Tullow, at their third attempt after defeats in 2008 and 2012, beat Skerries 20–3 at Athy on Easter Sunday 2017.

=== 2020–present ===
The 2020 competition was not completed after the IRFU brought the domestic club season to an early end because of the COVID-19 pandemic, and the cup was not awarded in 2020 or 2021. When the competition resumed in 2022, Kilkenny ended a 20-year wait for the title, beating Ashbourne 32–6 at Cill Dara RFC on Easter Sunday.

Tullow beat the holders, Kilkenny, in the 2023 final in Athy and retained the cup in 2024 against Ashbourne, with former Irish international and British and Irish Lion Seán O'Brien in their team. Their bid for a third successive title ended in the 2025 semi-finals, where Athy beat them 39–33. Athy went on to beat County Carlow 18–17 in the final at Naas RFC's ground in Forenaughts, winning the cup for the first time in 41 years in their first final appearance in 34 years. It was the fifth final between the two clubs, and Athy's second win in those meetings after Carlow had won the first three. Athy retained the title in 2026, beating Tullow 41–26 at Edenderry RFC on 19 April, in the highest scoring final in the competitions history by a team (Athy, 41 points) and combined score (67 points).

== Trophy ==
The trophy was bought by the Leinster Branch in 1892 for £25 from Wests of Grafton Street, Dublin, and was first presented that year to Blackrock College, the winners of the Junior Cup. As the cup was bought several years after the competition began, the trophy is slightly younger than the competition itself. It still bears the title "Leinster Junior Challenge Cup" and is one of the oldest trophies in Irish rugby. When the junior competitions were reorganised in the 1920s, the same trophy was designated for the new Provincial Towns Cup.

== Format ==
The Provincial Towns Cup is a straight knock-out competition for junior clubs in Leinster outside the Dublin metropolitan area. The draw is open, so smaller clubs can be drawn against the strongest junior sides in the province. Clubs from the top divisions of the Leinster League usually receive byes into the second round; in 2026, for example, five of the 27 entrants were given byes. Clubs that have gained senior status enter their junior (second) sides; and Skerries' J1 team reached the 2017 final. The final is usually played in April at a neutral host club's ground.

Ben Gormley, while president of the Leinster Branch, described the competition as "the Holy Grail of Junior rugby in the province".

== Finals ==
Where two scores are shown, the first match was drawn and the final was replayed.

Year	Winners	Score	Runners-up	Ref.
1926	Enniscorthy	6–0	Co. Kildare (Naas)	
1927	Enniscorthy	11–0	Balbriggan	
1928	Balbriggan	0–0, 8–0	Athy	
1929	County Carlow	9–0	Athy	
1930	Wexford Wanderers	6–3	Athy	
1931	County Carlow	9–0	Navan	
1932	Dundalk	7–0	Longford	
1933	County Carlow	6–5	Wexford Wanderers	
1934	Enniscorthy	5–3	Shannon Buccaneers	
1935	Shannon Buccaneers	16–0	Naas	
1936	Shannon Buccaneers	6–3	Dundalk	
1937	Dundalk	18–3	Shannon Buccaneers	
1938	Athy	6–5	Dundalk	
1939	Dundalk	3–0	Shannon Buccaneers	
1940	Athy	12–3	Dundalk	
1941	Skerries	7–5	Wexford Wanderers	
1942	Curragh	9–0	Dundalk	
1943	Skerries	4–3	Athy	
1944	Skerries	17–0	Curragh	
1945	Dundalk	17–0	Curragh	
1946	Tullamore	13–0	Skerries	
1947	Dundalk	9–6	Curragh	
1948	Dundalk	3–0	Athy	
1949	Dundalk	3–0	Naas	
1950	Skerries	0–0, 3–0	Rathdowney	
1951	Skerries	12–0	Rathdowney	
1952	Skerries	6–5	Naas	
1953	North Kildare	9–0	Rathdowney	
1954	Mullingar	3–0	Naas	
1955	Kilkenny	3–3, 9–3	North Kildare	
1956	Mullingar	6–3	Kilkenny	
1957	County Carlow	6–6, 9–3	Mullingar	
1958	North Kildare	6–3	Naas	
1959	Kilkenny	3–0	North Kildare	
1960	Tullamore	17–8	Wexford Wanderers	
1961	County Carlow	11–3	Navan	
1962	Delvin	12–0	Athy	
1963	Enniscorthy	3–3, 5–3	Skerries	
1964	Navan	6–6, 5–0	Kilkenny	
1965	County Carlow	9–6	Athy	
1966	Navan	8–3	Wexford Wanderers	
1967	Curragh	6–3	Drogheda	
1968	Navan	6–3	Arklow	
1969	Edenderry	6–3	Drogheda	
1970	Dundalk	8–3	Navan	
1971	Skerries	14–6	Navan	
1972	Skerries	19–6	Kilkenny	
1973	Skerries	12–11	North Kildare	
1974	Skerries	6–3	Arklow	
1975	Roscrea	8–7	Curragh	
1976	Tullamore	9–3	Drogheda	
1977	County Carlow	9–6	Athy	
1978	Athy	14–9	Curragh	
1979	Skerries	12–7	County Carlow	
1980	Roscrea	11–10	Portlaoise	
1981	Athy	8–3	County Carlow	
1982	Portlaoise	7–6	Naas	
1983	Edenderry	6–3	Athy	
1984	Athy	13–6	Portlaoise	
1985	Arklow	9–6	Drogheda	
1986	Kilkenny	10–0	Curragh	
1987	Dundalk	13–6	Kilkenny	
1988	Navan	7–3	Portlaoise	
1989	Enniscorthy	6–0	Mullingar	
1990	Navan	14–13	County Carlow	
1991	Navan	34–15	Athy	
1992	County Carlow	25–15	Enniscorthy	
1993	County Carlow	9–9, 25–18	Mullingar	
1994	County Carlow	20–15	Tullamore	
1995	Naas	17–6	Enniscorthy	
1996	County Carlow	25–10	Mullingar	
1997	County Carlow	21–3	Navan	
1998	Naas	13–3	Kilkenny	
1999	Navan	18–10	Ashbourne	
2000	Navan	9–7	Dundalk	
2001	Kilkenny	9–8	Portlaoise	
2002	Kilkenny	33–13	County Carlow	
2003	Portlaoise	20–3	Navan	
2004	Arklow	8–3	Portlaoise	
2005	Naas	23–16	Boyne	
2006	Tullamore	25–3	Wicklow	
2007	Navan	14–3	Skerries	
2008	Navan	30–13	Tullow	
2009	Boyne	27–21	Tullamore	
2010	Boyne	32–25	Tullamore	
2011	Dundalk	35–20	Tullamore	
2012	Enniscorthy	23–17	Tullow	
2013	Tullamore	38–6	Longford	
2014	Ashbourne	6–3	Kilkenny	
2015	Enniscorthy	9–8	Kilkenny	
2016	Wicklow	28–21	Enniscorthy	
2017	Tullow	20–3	Skerries	
2018	Enniscorthy	20–13	Tullow	
2019	Enniscorthy	10–9	Wicklow	
2020	Not awarded			
2021	Not awarded			
2022	Kilkenny	32–6	Ashbourne	
2023	Tullow	24–20	Kilkenny	
2024	Tullow	38–20	Ashbourne	
2025	Athy	18–17	County Carlow	
2026	Athy	41–26	Tullow	

== Roll of honour ==
Club	Champions	Runners-up	Winning years	Losing years
County Carlow	12	5	1929, 1931, 1933, 1957, 1961, 1965, 1977, 1992, 1993, 1994, 1996, 1997	1979, 1981, 1990, 2002, 2025
Skerries	11	4	1941, 1943, 1944, 1950, 1951, 1952, 1971, 1972, 1973, 1974, 1979	1946, 1963, 2007, 2017
Navan	10	6	1964, 1966, 1968, 1988, 1990, 1991, 1999, 2000, 2007, 2008	1931, 1961, 1970, 1971, 1997, 2003
Dundalk	10	5	1932, 1937, 1939, 1945, 1947, 1948, 1949, 1970, 1987, 2011	1936, 1938, 1940, 1942, 2000
Enniscorthy	9	3	1926, 1927, 1934, 1963, 1989, 2012, 2015, 2018, 2019	1992, 1995, 2016
Athy	7	10	1938, 1940, 1978, 1981, 1984, 2025, 2026	1928, 1929, 1930, 1943, 1948, 1962, 1965, 1977, 1983, 1991
Kilkenny	6	8	1955, 1959, 1986, 2001, 2002, 2022	1956, 1964, 1972, 1987, 1998, 2014, 2015, 2023
Tullamore	5	4	1946, 1960, 1976, 2006, 2013	1994, 2009, 2010, 2011
Naas	3	7	1995, 1998, 2005	1926, 1935, 1949, 1952, 1954, 1958, 1982
Tullow	3	4	2017, 2023, 2024	2008, 2012, 2018, 2026
Curragh	2	6	1942, 1967	1944, 1945, 1947, 1975, 1978, 1986
Portlaoise	2	5	1982, 2003	1980, 1984, 1988, 2001, 2004
Mullingar	2	4	1954, 1956	1957, 1989, 1993, 1996
Shannon Buccaneers	2	3	1935, 1936	1934, 1937, 1939
North Kildare	2	3	1953, 1958	1955, 1959, 1973
Arklow	2	2	1985, 2004	1968, 1974
Boyne	2	1	2009, 2010	2005
Edenderry	2	0	1969, 1983	–
Roscrea	2	0	1975, 1980	–
Wexford Wanderers	1	4	1930	1933, 1941, 1960, 1966
Ashbourne	1	3	2014	1999, 2022, 2024
Wicklow	1	2	2016	2006, 2019
Balbriggan	1	1	1928	1927
Delvin	1	0	1962	–
Drogheda	0	4	–	1967, 1969, 1976, 1985
Rathdowney	0	3	–	1950, 1951, 1953
Longford	0	2	–	1932, 2013

=== Notes ===
- 1926 Co. Kildare (Naas) is counted under Naas.
- The competition was not awarded in 2020 or 2021.

== Notable players ==
Several Ireland internationals have played in the Provincial Towns Cup, among them Seán O'Brien, Mick Doyle, Jimmy Kelly, Willie Duggan, Ned Byrne, Tony Ensor, Ciaran Fitzgerald, Jim Glennon, Phil Lawlor and Geordan Murphy. Earlier internationals to appear in the competition include W. J. McCormick, who won the cup with Balbriggan in 1928 and was capped in 1930, and Eamonn McGuire, a member of Dundalk's 1970 winning side. Shannon Buccaneers' players in the 1930s included the British and Irish Lion Sammy Walker.

== See also ==
- Leinster League
- Leinster Senior Cup (rugby union)
- Ulster Towns Cup
- List of oldest rugby union competitions
