= Gerry Culliton =

Irish rugby union player

- Full name: Gerard Culliton
- Born: 15 June 1936 Clonaslee, County Laois, Irish Free State
- Died: 7 September 2012 (aged 76) Rearymore, County Laois, Ireland
- School: Cistercian College

Rugby union career
Senior career
Years	Team	Apps	(Points)
–	Tullamore		
–	Wanderers		
–	Leinster		
International career
Years	Team	Apps	(Points)
–	Ireland	19	
Coaching career
- Years: Team
- –: Portlaoise

Gerard Culliton (15 June 1936 – 7 September 2012) was an Irish international rugby union player. A native of Clonaslee in County Laois, he won 19 caps for Ireland, playing in four different positions.

== Career ==
Culliton was educated at Cistercian College, Roscrea. While at school he played hurling and represented Laois GAA at junior level. He was going to be called up to the Laois senior team, but was invited by a friend to play a rugby match for Tullamore RFC. He played the match under a pseudonym; however, he later received a phone call from the Gaelic Athletic Association (GAA), stating that he had been seen playing rugby and was thus banned from playing Gaelic games under Rule 27, which prohibited any GAA player from playing rugby, football, hockey or cricket at the time.

After playing for Tullamore for two years, Culliton moved to Wanderers in Dublin, where he played for seventeen years. He went on to play provincial rugby for Leinster and then received a call-up to the Ireland national rugby union team, making his debut against England in 1959 at Lansdowne Road. He played for Ireland for six years. He also played for the Barbarians against South Africa national rugby union team and New Zealand.

In the 1970s, he started coaching Portlaoise RFC. In 1971, the GAA repealed Rule 27, allowing Culliton to rejoin the GAA. He started coaching hurling for Clonaslee–St Manman's and coached that club to its first Laois Senior Hurling Championship title since 1910, when Laois was still referred to as Queen's County.

== Personal life ==
Culliton was a Christian and carried out the Lough Derg pilgrimage fifty times. Away from rugby, he worked as a farmer. He had six children, with his son Garrett representing Ireland at the Paralympics four times. He died on 7 September 2012 at his home in Rearymore, County Laois.
