= Eamonn McGuire =

Irish rugby union player

- Full name: Eamonn Paul McGuire
- Born: 28 June 1939 Galway, Ireland
- Died: 14 September 2013 (aged 74) Dundalk, County Louth, Ireland
- School: St Joseph's College
- University: University College Galway

Rugby union career
- Position: Flanker
International career
Years	Team	Apps	(Points)
1963–64	Ireland	8	(0)

Eamonn Paul McGuire (28 June 1939 — 14 September 2013) was an Irish rugby union international.

McGuire, born and raised in Galway, was a speedy flanker who learnt his rugby during his time at St Joseph's College.

A regular fixture in the Connacht team through the 1960s, McGuire had several seasons with University College Galway while studying engineering, winning Connacht Senior League and Cup titles. He was on the Combined Universities side which beat the Springboks at Thomond Park in 1965.

Capped eight times for Ireland, McGuire debuted in a rare 0–0 draw against England at Lansdowne Road in the 1963 Five Nations Championship. He had a disallowed try in Ireland's one-point loss to the All Blacks later that year, with the referee deeming contentiously that the ball wasn't grounded over the line. In 1964, McGuire played in a win at Twickenham Stadium, the team's first win over the English in 16 years.

McGuire was a Leinster Towns Cup winner with Dundalk in 1970 and coached the club to success again in 1987. He lived the remainder of his life in Dundalk and was for a period the Chief fire officer for County Louth.

== See also ==
- List of Ireland national rugby union players
