= Seamus Kelly =

Seamus Kelly may refer to:

- Seamus Kelly (footballer) (born 1974), Irish footballer
- Seamus Kelly (rugby union, born 1991), American rugby union player
- Seamus Kelly (rugby union, born 1931), Irish rugby union player
