= Ian Dowling =

Physiotherapist and Ireland dual-code rugby international footballer

Personal information
- Born: Ian Dowling; 5 October 1982 (age 44) Kilkenny, Ireland
- Height: 1.81 m (5 ft 11 1/2 in)
- Weight: 93 kg (14 st 9 lb; 205 lb)

Playing information
Representative
Years	Team	Pld	T	G	FG	P
2004	Ireland	3

Rugby union career
- Position: Wing
Amateur team(s)
Years	Team	Apps	(Points)
- Kilkenny
–	Shannon		
Senior career
Years	Team	Apps	(Points)
2005–2011	Munster	98	(75)
- Correct as of 15 December 2011
International career
Years	Team	Apps	(Points)
2009	Ireland	2	(0)
2006–2010	Ireland Wolfhounds	5	(15)
- Correct as of 15 December 2011

Ian Dowling (born 5 October 1982) is an Irish physiotherapist and former rugby union and rugby league footballer.

== Playing career ==
He played underage and junior club rugby with Kilkenny RFC. He won an All-Ireland League medal with Shannon RFC before joining Munster, with whom he has won two European Rugby Cups both in Cardiff in May 2006 and May 2008. He also has played for the Ireland national rugby league team and Ireland A level. Caretaker Ireland coach Michael Bradley named him in the Ireland squad for the summer 2008 tour to New Zealand and Australia. Dowling played 27 times in the Heineken Cup for Munster, scoring 5 tries. Dowling won his first cap with the Irish International Rugby Union Team on their 2009 summer tour of North America when he lined out against Canada on 23 May 2009.

Dowling announced in April 2011 that he was retiring from rugby, due to a hip injury, after medical consultation.

"It's been a fabulous experience. I've made some great friends and take with me really great memories, the two Heineken Cup wins obviously the highlights. But besides that, I've had wonderful times with Munster," said Dowling.

== Personal life ==
Dowling is a qualified physiotherapist by trade. He has worked with the Tipperary senior county footballers.

He is married to the niece of Irish comedian, singer and actress June Rodgers.
