= Brian Deeny =

Irish rugby union player

- Born: 2 March 2000 (age 26) Wexford, Ireland
- Height: 1.98 m (6 ft 6 in)
- Weight: 119 kg (18.7 st; 262 lb)
- School: St Peter's College, Wexford
- University: University College Dublin

Rugby union career
- Position: Lock
Youth career
- -: Wexford Wanderers RFC
Senior career
Years	Team	Apps	(Points)
2021–	Leinster	48	(20)
- Correct as of 21 March 2026
International career
Years	Team	Apps	(Points)
2019–2020	Ireland U20s	7	(5)
- Correct as of 25 April 2022

Brian Deeny (born 3 February 2000) is an Irish rugby union player, currently playing for United Rugby Championship and European Rugby Champions Cup side Leinster. His preferred position is lock.

== Youth ==
Prior to his rugby career Deeny played gaelic football for St Peter's College, winning a Leinster Schools Senior Football A title. He went on to study biomedical sciences at Trinity College Dublin. Deeny played the majority of his junior rugby for Wexford Wanderers and later Clontarf.

== Leinster ==
Deeny was named in the Leinster Rugby academy for the 2021–22 season. He made his debut in Round 16 of the 2021–22 United Rugby Championship against the Sharks. He signed his first senior contract, and was promoted to the full Leinster squad for the 2022–23 United Rugby Championship in March 2022.

== Ireland ==
Deeny appeared for the Irish under-20s at the 2019 World Rugby Under 20 Championship.
