= Fionn Carr =

Irish rugby union player (born 1985)

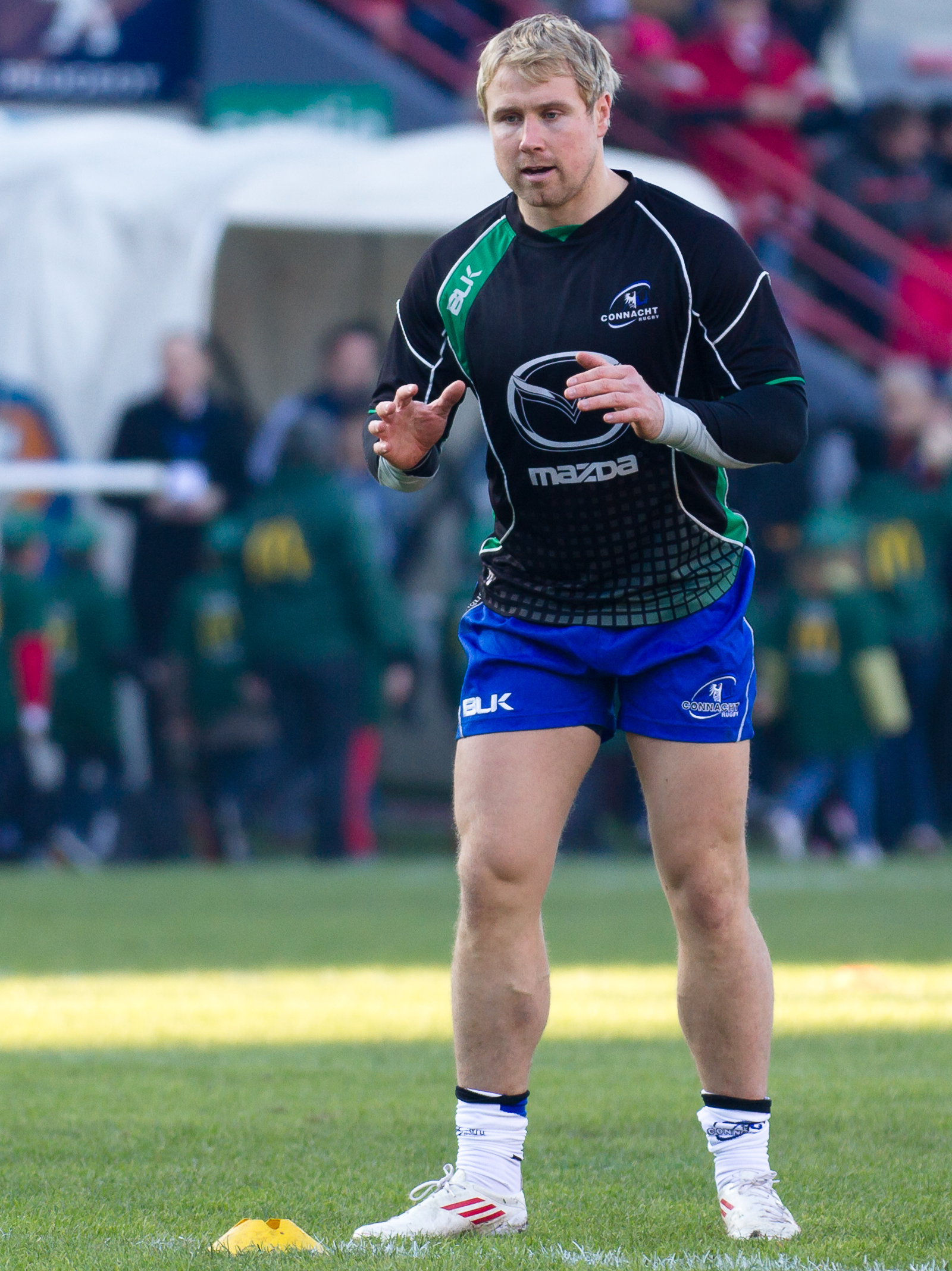
- Born: Fionn Carr; 17 December 1985 (age 40) Ardclough, County Kildare, Ireland
- Height: 1.80 m (5 ft 11 in)
- Weight: 93 kg (14 st 9 lb)
- School: Newbridge College
- University: University College Dublin

Rugby union career
- Position(s): Wing, Fullback
- Current team: Naas
Amateur team(s)
Years	Team	Apps	(Points)
- Naas
- UCD
- Blackrock College
2016–	Naas		
Senior career
Years	Team	Apps	(Points)
2007–2008	Leinster	1	(0)
2008–2011	Connacht	73	(170)
2011–2013	Leinster	37	(40)
2013–2016	Connacht	37	(40)
- Correct as of 8 May 2015
International career
Years	Team	Apps	(Points)
2004	Ireland Schools	2	(0)
2005	Ireland U19	1	(0)
2006	Ireland U21	10	(15)
2009–2011	Ireland Wolfhounds	2	(0)
- Correct as of 28 February 2014
National sevens team
Years	Team		Comps
2017	Ireland 7s		4
- Correct as of 19 December 2020

Fionn Carr (born 17 December 1985) is a former Irish rugby union player. He played mainly as a wing but could also line out as fullback. Carr spent most of his professional career with Connacht in the Pro12, and also played for fellow Irish province Leinster. He represented Ireland at Schools, Under-19 and Under-21 levels, as well as for the Ireland national rugby sevens team.

Carr also played at amateur rugby for Naas in the All-Ireland League. He is currently the backs coach for Catholic University School in Dublin.

== Youth ==
Carr began playing rugby at a young age with Naas RFC. At school level, he represented Newbridge College, playing once for the Junior Cup team and twice for the Senior Cup team. He later earned a rugby scholarship to University College Dublin, where he studied Arts. During his second year, Carr left the UCD rugby team and joined Blackrock College.

== Professional club career ==
Carr played once for Leinster during the 2007–08 Celtic League, starting on the wing against Glasgow Warriors.

=== Connacht ===
After finishing in UCD, Carr signed for the western province of Connacht. He was the top try-scorer for Connacht during the 2008–09 Celtic League campaign, scoring eight tries in the league. This tally put him one behind the top try-scorer Thom Evans. He also scored three tries for the team in six appearances in the 2008–09 European Challenge Cup. He ended his first stint at Connacht at the end of the 2010-11 season with 34 tries, 22 of them in the league and 12 in the Challenge Cup. At the time this made him the province's all-time top try-scorer.

=== Return to Leinster ===
Carr joined Leinster for the start of the 2011–12 season. He made his first appearance for the team since the 2007–08 season against the Ospreys. He made his first ever appearance in the Heineken Cup on 20 November 2011, against the Glasgow Warriors. In his first season back in his native province, he played 18 times in the league, with 3 of those appearances being from the bench, scoring 5 tries. He also made 2 appearances from the bench in the 2011–12 Heineken Cup, as Leinster won the competition.

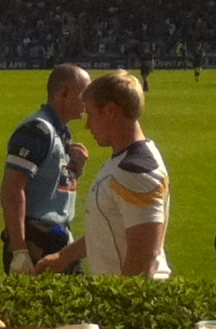
Fionn Carr during the 2012 Pro12 Grand Final

The following season, Carr played 16 times for the province, but did not play in the Heineken Cup pool stages or the successful Amlin Cup campaign, with all of his appearances coming in the Pro 12. He scored only 3 tries, with those coming against Newport Gwent Dragons, Cardiff Blues and Zebre. He left Leinster at the end of the 2012–13 season, having scored 8 tries in his two seasons there, all of them coming in the league.

=== Return to Connacht ===
Carr returned to Connacht for the 2013–14 season, having turned down the offer of a new contract with Leinster. His return debut came in the opening game of the 2013–14 Pro12 against Zebre. Carr started the game and scored a try. He played his first ever Heineken Cup game for Connacht on 11 October 2013, against Saracens in Galway. Carr left Connacht at the end of the 2015-16 season.

=== All Ireland League ===
Carr joined Naas RFC in the All Ireland League in the summer of 2016.

== International career ==
Carr played for Ireland at various under-age levels, including Under-19 and Under-21.

Carr also played for Ireland's second tier international team, which is currently known as Ireland Wolfhounds and was previously Ireland A. His first appearance for Ireland A came in a 2009 Churchill Cup against Canada. He also started against the England Saxons on 31 January 2010, in a 17–13 loss. In 2010, the Irish Times referred to Carr as "Perhaps the fastest winger in the country one of Ireland’s outstanding performers against England Saxons this season". Despite his strong try-scoring record while with the province, Carr did not receive a full international cap.

Carr played for the Ireland national rugby sevens team in the Rugby Europe 2017 Sevens Grand Prix Series, playing as the starting centre. Carr's performance in the 2017 Grand Prix helped the team qualify for the 2018 Hong Kong Sevens and the 2018 Rugby World Cup Sevens.
