= Peter Bracken =

Ireland international rugby union player

- Born: Peter Bracken; 1 December 1977 (age 48) Tullamore, Ireland
- Height: 1.88 m (6 ft 2 in)
- Weight: 118 kg (18 st 8 lb)
- School: Tullamore Vocational School; St. Andrew's College, Dublin

Rugby union career
- Position: Prop
Youth career
- Tullamore
Amateur team(s)
Years	Team	Apps	(Points)
- UL Bohemians
–	Galwegians		
Senior career
Years	Team	Apps	(Points)
2001–2005	Connacht	38	(5)
2005–2007	Wasps	51	(5)
2007–2009	Bristol	14	(0)
2009	Harlequins	0	(0)
2009–2010	Dragons	8	(0)
2010–2011	Carcassonne	25	(0)
International career
Years	Team	Apps	(Points)
2006	Barbarians	1	(0)
2003–2007	Ireland A	5	(0)

Peter Bracken (born 1 December 1977) is a rugby union coach and former player and retired cage fighter. He played as a prop, primarily at tighthead.

In his formative rugby years he played for Tullamore and also at St. Andrew's College, Dublin, which he attended on Scholarship.

== Playing career ==
Bracken initially begun his career with Munster Rugby and UL Bohemians, and later joined Connacht Rugby for whom he played with for five seasons. During this time, he also featured in the AIL with Galwegians RFC. In 2005, he moved to the English Premiership to play for London Wasps, who, with Bracken, won an Anglo-Welsh Cup in 2006, and a Heineken Cup in 2007. Bracken featured heavily in the campaign and came on as a substitute in the final as Wasps defeated Leicester Tigers 25-9. He joined Bristol in 2007, although injury limited the number of games he played, and was subsequently released in January 2009. He joined Harlequins for the remainder of the 2008-09 season, before joining Newport Gwent Dragons in October 2009. His final season as a professional was in the French D2 with US Carcassonne in 2010-11.

== Achievements ==
Bracken has represented the Barbarians, playing against England in May 2006. He was a member of the Irish squads on their tour of Australia and New Zealand in 2006, and their 2007 tour of Argentina, as well as the extended squad for the 2007 World Cup.

He has previously been capped by Ireland A, schoolboys and at under-18 levels.

== Coaching career ==
Following his retirement from professional rugby, Bracken became heavily involved with rugby coaching and is an IRFU Elite Coach. He has been involved with multiple amateur and professional teams as a scrum coach, such as with Boston Irish Wolfhounds in the United States' Rugby Super League, Connemara RFC in the AIL, and the Irish women's team. He also provides specialised scrum coaching and analysis through his company, The Scrum Doctor.

Bracken was a member of the Irish women's back-room team during their fourth-place finish in the 2014 World Cup, and during Ireland's Six Nations Championship victory in 2015.
