= Frank Byrne (rugby union) =

Irish rugby union player

- Full name: Noel Francis Byrne
- Born: 18 December 1938 (age 87) Curragh, County Kildare, Ireland

Rugby union career
- Position: Wing
International career
Years	Team	Apps	(Points)
1962	Ireland	1	(0)

Noel Francis Byrne (born 18 December 1938) is an Irish former international rugby union player.

Born in Curragh, County Kildare, Byrne is the younger brother of 1950s Ireland winger Seamus and played his early rugby with Naas. He was a three-quarter and won his solitary Ireland cap while playing with University College Dublin, replacing an injured Niall Brophy for a 1962 Five Nations match against France in Paris.

Byrne became a dentist in Bray.

== See also ==
- List of Ireland national rugby union players
