= Bill Mulcahy =

Irish rugby union player

- Born: William Albert Mulcahy; 7 January 1935 Rathkeale, County Limerick, Ireland
- Died: 28 February 2025 (aged 90) Skerries, County Dublin, Ireland
- Height: 1.86 m (6 ft 1 in)
- Weight: 102 kg (225 lb)
- School: St. Munchin's College

Rugby union career
- Position: Lock
Amateur team(s)
Years	Team	Apps	(Points)
- St. Vincent's Hospital
–	Bohemians		
–	UCD		
–	Bective Rangers		
–	Skerries RFC		
Senior career
Years	Team	Apps	(Points)
1955–69	Leinster	40	
International career
Years	Team	Apps	(Points)
1958–65	Ireland	35	(0)
1959, 1962	Lions	6	(0)

William Albert Mulcahy (7 January 1935 – 28 February 2025) was an Irish rugby union player. He represented UL Bohemians R.F.C. University College Dublin R.F.C., Bective Rangers, Skerries RFC, Leinster, Ireland and the British and Irish Lions. He was educated at St Munchin's College, Limerick.

== UCD ==
Mulcahy, along with teammate Niall Brophy, became the first players from UCD to represent the British and Irish Lions (then known as the British Lions) during their 1959 tour to Australia and New Zealand.

== Ireland ==
Mulcahy made his debut for Ireland against Australia on 18 January 1958. His last match for Ireland was against South Africa on 10 April 1965. He was part of Ireland's team when they recorded first test victories against Australia (1958) and South Africa (1965).

== British and Irish Lions ==
Mulcahy received his first Lions call-up in 1959 to tour Australia and New Zealand. He played in 15 out of the 33 tour games, and earned 2 test caps, one against Australia on 6 June and the other against New Zealand on 19 September. He toured with the Lions again on their 1962 tour to South Africa. Mulcahy played in 17 out of the 24 tour games, including all four of the tests.

== After rugby ==
After retiring from rugby, Mulcahy became an Administrator and went on to become President of the Leinster Branch in 1995–96, the first President from Skerries RFC.

Mulcahy was inducted into the Guinness Hall of Fame in 2009. He died on 28 February 2025, at the age of 90.
