= Jeremy Loughman =

Irish rugby union player

- Born: 22 July 1995 (age 31) Reno, United States
- Height: 1.85 m (6 ft 1 in)
- Weight: 118 kg (260 lb; 18 st 8 lb)
- School: Blackrock College

Rugby union career
- Position: Prop
Amateur team(s)
Years	Team	Apps	(Points)
2014–2018	UCD		
2018–	Garryowen		
Senior career
Years	Team	Apps	(Points)
2016	Leinster	5	(0)
2017–	Munster	139	(30)
- Correct as of 31 October 2026
International career
Years	Team	Apps	(Points)
2015	Ireland U20	5	(0)
2022	Ireland A	1	(0)
2022–	Ireland	10	(0)
- Correct as of 18 July 2026

Jeremy Loughman (born 22 July 1995) is an Irish rugby union player who plays as a prop for United Rugby Championship club Munster and the Ireland national team.

== Early life ==
Loughman was born in Reno, Nevada and lived there until he was four-years-old, when his family moved to Sevenoaks, Kent due to his father's work in the oil and gas industry. The family stayed there for eight years before moving to Athy, County Kildare, where Loughman first played rugby for Athy RFC, while he attended Árdscoil na Tríonóide and was capped at Leinster Under-18 Youths level. He then moved to Blackrock College, Dublin for his fifth and sixth year, where he won the Leinster Schools Rugby Senior Cup in 2013 and 2014.

== Munster ==
Loughman joined Munster on a three-month development contract in December 2017, having previously been a member of the Leinster Academy. He made his first appearance for Munster A on 8 December 2017, featuring off the bench in the provinces' 25–14 defeat against Bedford Blues in the 2017–18 British and Irish Cup. He made his debut for Munster on 1 January 2018, coming on as a replacement for James Cronin in the 2017–18 Pro14 fixture against Ulster. Loughman's contract was extended until the end of the 2017–18 season in April 2018, before being extended again for the whole of the 2018–19 season.

Loughman signed a one-year contract extension with Munster in December 2018. Loughman made his Champions Cup debut for Munster on 9 December 2018, featuring off the bench in their 30–5 win against French pool 2 opponents Castres. He scored his first try for Munster in their 31–12 win against Zebre on 23 March 2019. In his first Champions Cup start for Munster, in their opening 2019–20 tournament pool 4 fixture against Welsh side Ospreys on 16 November 2019, Loughman won the Man-of-the-Match award and scored a try in the provinces 32–13 away win.

Loughman signed a two-year contract with Munster in February 2020, a deal that will see him remain with the province until at least June 2022. He earned his 50th cap for Munster in their 38–10 win against Ulster in round 2 of the Pro14 Rainbow Cup on 7 May 2021. Loughman signed a two-year contract extension in January 2022, and started in Munster's 19–14 win against the Stormers in the final of the 2022–23 United Rugby Championship on 27 May 2023.

== International career ==
Loughman received his first senior international call-up when he was brought into the Ireland squad by head coach Andy Farrell ahead of their Six Nations round 4 fixture against England in March 2022, and was also selected in the squad for the 2022 Ireland rugby union tour of New Zealand. Loughman made his first appearance for Ireland when he started in their uncapped match against the Māori All Blacks on 29 June, however, he was removed from the field in the first minute for a head injury assessment. Loughman appeared to display symptoms of concussion, but passed the assessment by an independent doctor and returned to the field, only to be removed permanently at half-time as a precaution. Progressive Rugby, who advocate for greater welfare in rugby, criticised the decision to allow Loughman to return to the field, though Ireland head coach Andy Farrell defended the decision, insisting that Loughman passed the necessary tests but was removed at half-time in the best interests of Loughman himself.

New Zealand Rugby later admitted that a "communications gap" was responsible for allowing Loughman to return to the field and that, as Loughman was displaying symptoms of concussion, the head injury assessment was not necessary, as World Rugby guidelines stipulate that a player displaying such symptoms be immediately removed from play. Loughman was then ruled out of Ireland's first test against New Zealand on 2 July, but returned to start in the second uncapped match against the Māori All Blacks on 12 July, which Ireland won 30–24 to draw the series 1–1. Loughman started for Ireland A in their 47–19 defeat against an All Blacks XV on 4 November 2022, and made his senior international debut for Ireland eight days later when he started in their 35–17 win against Fiji during the 2022 Autumn Nations Series.

Despite initially missing out on selection, Loughman was called-up to Ireland's training squad for the 2023 Rugby World Cup warm-up matches after provincial teammate Dave Kilcoyne sustained an injury, and featured as a replacement in the 29–10 win against England on 19 August and the 17–13 win against Samoa on 26 August before being selected in Ireland's 33-man squad for the 2023 Rugby World Cup. He featured as a replacement in Ireland's opening 82–8 win against Romania on 9 September.

== Statistics ==
=== International analysis by opposition ===
Against	Played	Won	Lost	Drawn	Tries	Points	% Won
England	1	1	0	0	0	0	100
Fiji	1	1	0	0	0	0	100
Romania	1	1	0	0	0	0	100
Samoa	1	1	0	0	0	0	100
Total	4	4	0	0	0	0	100

Correct as of 9 September 2023

== Honours ==
=== Munster ===
- United Rugby Championship
  - Winner (1): 2022–23
