= Amy Larn =

Irish rugby sevens player

- Born: 14 July 2004 (age 22)
- Height: 168 cm (5 ft 6 in)
- Weight: 64 kg (141 lb; 10 st 1 lb)

Rugby union career
- Position: Scrum-half
National sevens team
Years	Team	Comps
2024–	Ireland	

Amy Larn (born 14 July 2004) is an Irish rugby union and sevens player. She competed for Ireland at the 2024 Summer Olympics.

== Career ==
Larn played club rugby for Athy RFC. She was part of the Under-18 side that won bronze at the Europe Sevens Championships in 2022. She has also played county football and captained the Kildare minor team in 2022. She made her senior Kildare starting debut in February 2024.

She just completed her first year of a BA at Maynooth University.

=== Rugby career ===
Larn made her World Series debut in the Singapore leg in May. She represented Ireland at the 2024 Summer Olympics in Paris. She was initially a travelling reserve but was brought into the squad due to captain, Lucy Mulhall, sustaining an injury.

She was called into the Ireland fifteens side for the 2025 Six Nations Championship in March.
