= All-Ireland Junior Cup (rugby union) =

Irish rugby union cup competition

- Sport: Rugby Union
- Instituted: 2005
- Inaugural season: 2005–06
- Number of teams: 16
- Country: Ireland
- Holders: Seapoint (2025–26)
- Most titles: Tullamore, Ashbourne (3 titles)
- Website: All-Ireland Junior Cup

The All-Ireland Junior Cup, known as the Energia Men's Junior Cup for sponsorship reasons, is an annual knockout competition for rugby union clubs in Ireland. The top 4 Junior clubs from each of the 4 provinces qualify for the competition each season.

Beginning in 2005, the competition consisted of just 8 teams for the first season and was won by Rainey Old Boys from Ulster. It was expanded to 16 teams from the second season onwards. In the 20 seasons of the competition it has been dominated by teams from Leinster who have won it 13 times. Tullamore and Ashbourne have the most titles with 3 each.

== Roll of honour ==
=== Wins by team ===
	Teams	Titles	Seasons
1	Tullamore	3	2008–09, 2011–12, 2012–13
1	Ashbourne	3	2016–17, 2017–18, 2018–19
3	Seapoint	2	2006–07, 2025-26
3	Enniscorthy	2	2013–14, 2015–16
3	Clogher Valley	2	2021–22, 2022–23
6	Rainey Old Boys	1	2005–06
6	Navan	1	2007–08
6	City of Derry	1	2009–10
6	Crosshaven	1	2010–11
6	Dundalk	1	2014–15
6	Kilfeacle & District	1	2019–20
6	Ballyclare	1	2023–24
6	Bective Rangers	1	2024–25

=== Wins by Province ===
	Province	Wins	Runners-up
1	Leinster	13	6
2	Ulster	5	10
3	Munster	2	2
4	Connacht	—	2

== List of finals ==
Season	Winners	Score	Runners-up	Venue
2005–06	Rainey Old Boys	27-5	Youghal	Lansdowne Road
2006–07	Seapoint	47-15	Coleraine	Dubarry Park
2007–08	Navan	20-6	Tullamore	Dubarry Park
2008–09	Tullamore	23-13	Navan	Dubarry Park
2009–10	City of Derry	19-17	City of Armagh	Dubarry Park
2010–11	Crosshaven	17-9	Monivea	Templeville Road, Templeogue
2011–12	Tullamore	9-3	Monivea	Dubarry Park
2012–13	Tullamore	29-10	Enniscorthy	Beech Park, Kildare
2013–14	Enniscorthy	10-9	Clogher Valley	Ashtown (Coolmine RFC)
2014–15	Dundalk	55-5	Bangor	Chambers Park, Portadown
2015–16	Enniscorthy	23-7	Instonians	Milltown (Ashbourne RFC)
2016–17	Ashbourne	22-20	Enniscorthy	Donnybrook Stadium
2017–18	Ashbourne	18-9	Kilfeacle & District	Togher, Portlaoise
2018-19	Ashbourne	16-11	Enniscorthy	Carbury (Edenderry RFC)
2019–20	Kilfeacle & District	28-24	Dromore	Ashtown (Coolmine RFC)
2020–21	cancelled due to the COVID-19 pandemic			
2021–22	Clogher Valley	13-11	Ballyclare	Ravenhill Stadium
2022–23	Clogher Valley	30-18	Enniskillen	Ravenhill Stadium
2023–24	Ballyclare	48-8	Bective Rangers	Mill Road, Dundalk
2024–25	Bective Rangers	37-31	Enniskillen	Milltown (Ashbourne RFC)
2025–26	Seapoint	13-10	Dromore	Milltown (Ashbourne RFC)

== See also ==
- Bateman Cup
