= Katie Fitzhenry =

- Born: 23 April 1989 (age 37) Coolcotts, County Wexford, Ireland
- University: Waterford IT
- Occupation(s): Women’s National WNTS and Talent Identification Manager for Irish Rugby

Rugby union career
- Position: Centre
- Current team: Blackrock College RFC
Senior career
Years	Team	Apps	(Points)
2006–2011	Wexford Wanderers RFC		
2011–present	Blackrock College RFC		
Provincial / State sides
Years	Team	Apps	(Points)
2010	Leinster		
International career
Years	Team	Apps	(Points)
2015–2021	Ireland	14	
National sevens team
Years	Team		Comps
- Ireland

Katie Fitzhenry (born 23 April 1989) is a women's rugby union player from Coolcotts in Wexford, County Wexford, Ireland. She plays as a centre for Blackrock College RFC, Leinster Rugby, the Ireland women's national rugby union team and the Ireland women's national rugby sevens team.

== Career ==
Fitzhenry started playing rugby after experiencing tag rugby at Loreto Secondary School when she was 16. She had previously played camogie and Gaelic football for Wexford GAA. After leaving school, she was one of the founding members of Wexford Wanderers RFC's women's team. She made her provincial debut for Leinster against Ulster in 2010 following a successful trial.

She played for Wexford Wanderers from 2006 to 2011 and moved to Dublin club Blackrock College in 2011 to play at a higher level.

Following this, she was signed by the Irish Rugby Football Union as a centrally contracted rugby sevens player and was one of the first players to sign up to the Irish Institute of Sport's career development course at Griffith College. While balancing training for both the rugby union and rugby sevens teams, she managed a number of juice bars and ice cream parlours. In 2015, she made her debut for the Ireland women's national rugby union team in the Women's Six Nations Championship against Italy. A week later she made her first start for Ireland, playing as a centre against France.

In 2017, Fitzhenry was selected as part of Ireland's 2017 Women's Rugby World Cup squad. She played in the tournament and she scored a try in Ireland's seventh place playoff against Wales at Ravenhill Stadium in Belfast, Northern Ireland.

Fitzhenry missed a lot of the 2018–2019 season due to a cruciate ligament knee injury. She returned to the Ireland women's national rugby sevens in October 2019.

In 2020 and 2021 she was selected on Ireland's Six Nations squads. She made 14 appearances for Ireland's XV and announced her retirement from international rugby in May 2021.

Fitzhenry played camogie for Wexford underage and later played ladies gaelic football with Thomas Davis in Dublin, won an All-Ireland Junior Ladies Football title with Thomas Davis in 2014.

She studied Sport and Recreation Management in Waterford IT (2008–2011) and now works for Irish Rugby as the Women's National WNTS and Talent Identification Manager.
