= Kilkenny RFC =

Irish rugby union club based in Kilkenny, Co.Kilkenny

Coordinates: 52.62234611°N 7.25123548°W

(Ireland) Kilkenny
- Full name: Kilkenny Rugby Football Club
- Union: IRFU; Leinster
- Founded: 1886; 140 years ago
- Ground(s): Foulkstown, Kilkenny
- President: David Mathews
- Coach: David O'Connor
Team kit

Kilkenny RFC is an Irish rugby union team based in Kilkenny, County Kilkenny, playing in Division 1B of the Leinster League as of the 2024–25 season. The club colours are black and white.

== Honours ==
- Leinster Junior Challenge Cup: 1920
- Leinster Towns Cup: 1955, 1959, 1986, 2001, 2002, 2022
- Leinster League Division One: 2001/2002, 2002/2003
- South East League: 2002, 2005
