= Philip Lawlor =

Irish rugby union player

- Full name: Philip John Lawlor
- Born: 2 July 1965 (age 61) County Kildare, Ireland

Rugby union career
- Position: No. 8
International career
Years	Team	Apps	(Points)
1990–93	Ireland	3	(0)

Philip John Lawlor (born 2 July 1965) is an Irish former rugby union international.

Lawlor, a Newbridge College product, grew up in County Kildare and comes from a well known family. His mother Patsy and elder brother Anthony both served in the Seanad Éireann as Senators for Fine Gael.

Originally with Naas RFC, Lawlor later played for Bective Rangers and Leinster as a back-row forward. He was capped three times for Ireland, debuting against Argentina at Lansdowne Road in 1990. His next opportunity came against the touring Australians in 1992 and he featured once in the 1993 Five Nations Championship.

== See also ==
- List of Ireland national rugby union players
