= 2024 IRFU Women's Interprovincial Series =

Irish rugby union competition

- Sport: Women's rugby union
- Number of teams: 4
- Province: Connacht; Leinster; Munster; Ulster
- Holders: Leinster (7th title)
- Most titles: Munster (15 titles)
- Website: www.irishrugby.ie

Location of IRFU Women's Interprovincial Series Provinces:
Republic of Ireland Northern Ireland

The 2024 IRFU Women's Interprovincial Series was contested by women's teams representing the four provincial rugby unions of Ireland, under the same branding and uniforms as the senior men's teams in the United Rugby Championship. The competition currently uses a single round-robin format, similar to the one used in both the Six Nations Championship and the Women's Six Nations Championship. Each team plays the other three teams once. The following year the fixtures are reversed. As in previous seasons the competition also featured playoffs and a final.

== Regular series ==
=== Round 1 ===
10 August 2024
2:30pm

(1 BP) Munster (Ireland)	29-22	(Ireland) Ulster (2 BP)
Try: Alana McInerney (3); Chloe Pearse; Chisom Ugwueru; Con: Kate Flannery (2)	Report	Try: Tara O’Neill; India Daley; Lucy Thompson; Brittany Hogan; Con: Vicky Irwin

Virgin Media Park
Referee: Cathal Roddy (IRFU)

10 August 2024
4:45pm

(1 BP) Leinster (Ireland)	38-19	(Ireland) Connacht
Try: Ella Roberts; Katie Whelan (2); Aoife Dalton; Emma Tilly; Caoimhe Molloy; Con: Nikki Caughey (4)	Report	Try: Faith Oviawe (2); Laoise McGonagle; Con: Nicole Fowley (2)

Energia Park

=== Round 2 ===
17 August 2024
2:30pm

Ulster (Ireland)	25-25	(Ireland) Connacht (1 BP)
Try: Lucy Thompson; India Daley; Stacey Sloan; Con: Vicky Irwin (2); Pen: Abby Moyles (2)	Report	Try: Méabh Deely (2); Faith Oviawe; Laoise McGonagle; Con: Méabh Deely; Pen: Méabh Deely

Kingspan Stadium

17 August 2024
4:45pm

(1 BP) Munster (Ireland)	32-21	(Ireland) Leinster
Try: Beth Buttimer; Claire Bennett; Chisom Ugwueru penalty try Alana McInerney; Con: Kate Flannery; Pen: Kate Flannery	Report	Try: Ailsa Hughes; Aoife Dalton; Leah Tarpey; Con: Nikki Caughey (2); Jemma Farrell

Virgin Media Park

=== Round 3 ===
24 August 2024
2:30pm

(2 BP) Connacht (Ireland)	24-29	(Ireland) Munster (1 BP)
Try: Faith Oviawe; Orla Dixon (2), Edel McMahon; Con: Nicole Fowley (2)	Report	Try: Chloe Pearse; Chisom Ugwueru; Alana McInerney (2); Beth Buttimer; Con: Kate Flannery (2)

Dexcom Stadium

24 August 2024
4:45pm

Ulster (Ireland)	14-39	(Ireland) Leinster (1 BP)
Try: Brittany Hogan (2); Con: Abby Moyles (2)	Report	Try: Robyn O'Connor; Ruth Campbell; Leah Tarpey; Linda Djougang; Emma Tilly; Eimear Corri; Kelly Burke; Con: Jemma Farrell (2); Nikki Caughey

Kingspan Stadium

== Table ==
Pos	Team	Pld	W	D	L	PF	PA	PD	TF	TA	TB	LB	Pts	Qualification or relegation
1	Munster Women	3	3	0	0	90	67	+23	15	11	3	0	15	Qualified for Interprovincial final
2	Leinster Women (C)	3	2	0	1	98	65	+33	16	10	2	0	10	Qualified for Interprovincial final
3	Connacht Women	3	0	1	2	68	92	−24	11	14	2	1	5	Qualified for third/fourth place final
4	Ulster Women	3	0	1	2	61	93	−32	9	16	1	1	4	Qualified for third/fourth place final

First match(es) will be played: Unknown. Source: Unknown
Rules for classification: 1) competition points; 2) match points difference; 3) match points for
(C) Champion

== Finals day ==
Third/Fourth play-off

31 August 2024
2:30pm

Ulster (Ireland)	19-33	(Ireland) Connacht
Try: Sophie Barrett; Abby Moyles (2); Con: Abby Moyles	Report	Try: Edel McMahon; Faith Oviawe (2); Hannah Clarke; Beibhinn Gleeson; Con: Nicole Fowley (4)

Kingspan Stadium

Women's Interprovincial Final

31 August 2024
4:45pm

Munster (Ireland)	7-27	(Ireland) Leinster
Try: Alana McInerney; Con: Kate Flannery	Report	Try: Leah Tarpey (2); Aoife Wafer; Con: Nikki Caughey (2); Dannah O'Brien; Pen: Nikky Caughey; Dannah O'Brien

Kingspan Stadium

== Provinces ==
Team	Coach / Director of Rugby	Captain	Stadium	Capacity
Connacht Rugby	Emer O’Dowd		Dexcom Stadium	6,129 (expandable to 8,129)
Leinster Rugby	Tania Rosser		Energia Park	6,000
Munster Rugby	Fiona Hayes		Virgin Media Park	8,008
Ulster Rugby	Murray Houston		Kingspan Stadium	18,196 (9,000 seated)

== Press reaction ==
IRFU Head of Women's Development, Amanda Greensmith, commented: “Following on from the announcement of the Women’s Energia All-Ireland League fixtures for the upcoming 2024/25 season, we’re delighted to now confirm the schedule for this year’s Vodafone Women’s Interprovincial Championship.

“The quality, competitiveness and excitement has been building year-on-year and we’re looking forward to four weekends of Women’s Interprovincial rugby, marking the start of a busy and important season ahead both domestically and internationally.

“The support of Vodafone as title sponsor and of TG4 and BBC NI in broadcasting the Championship has been a real positive in recent years as the competition, teams and players are given the platform to showcase themselves to a wider audience, growing the sport and building exciting momentum behind the Women’s game.”
