= Skerries RFC =

Irish rugby union club, based in Skerries, Co. Dublin

- Union: (Ireland) IRFU
- Branch: Leinster
- Nickname: The Goats
- Founded: 1926; 100 years ago
- Ground(s): Holmpatrick, (Rokelyoke) Skerries (Capacity: 600)
- Chairman: Clyde Davidson
- President: David Quirke
- Director of Rugby: Derek O'Sullivan
- Coach: Johnny Tydnall
- Captain: Kieran Leonard
- League: A.I.L. Div 2B
- 2024–25: 9th.
Team kit

Official website
- www.skerriesrfc.ie

Skerries RFC is an Irish rugby union team based in Skerries, Dublin in the province of Leinster. They play in Division 2B of the All-Ireland League.

The club was founded and became a member of the Leinster Branch of the IRFU in 1926. They played their first recorded match against Drogheda, and won by 9 points to 8.

The club has 2 pitches: 1x grass and 1x 3G state-of-the-art pitch (opened November 2019).

The club has a long-standing relationship with the local secondary school Skerries Community College, formerly De La Salle Secondary College Skerries, where many past and current players attended. The college makes use of the grounds at Holmpatrick for training and home matches. The club has a long relationship with Dunbar RFC located on the east coast of Scotland, who they have been playing since 1952. This association is the longest continuous club fixture between a pair of Irish and Scottish rugby clubs.

The club is community based and field the following teams (Levels):

Male: 2 adult (Senior AIL & Junior Leinster Metro), U19s (JP Fanagan), youths: U13 to U18 & minis: U6 to U12.

Female: Girls U14 and U16 teams. All girls up to age 18 are most welcome as the club actively build their female participation, those aged 6 to 12 playing mini rugby combined with boys.

== Honours ==
- Leinster Senior League Shield
  - Winners: (1) 2012-13
- Leinster Towns Cup
  - Winners: (11) 1941, 1943, 1944, 1950, 1951, 1952, 1971, 1972, 1973, 1974, 1979
  - Runners Up: (5) 1946, 1963, 1944, 2007, 2017

== Notable players ==
(British & Irish Lions) British and Irish Lions

- Bill Mulcahy (1959, 1962)

Ireland

- Bill Mulcahy
- Jim Glennon
- Killian Keane
- Ciarán Frawley
