= Dundalk R.F.C. =

Irish rugby union club based in Dundalk, Co.Louth

Dundalk
- Full name: Dundalk Rugby Football Club
- Union: (Ireland) IRFU
- Branch: Leinster
- Nickname: The Hoops
- Founded: 1877; 149 years ago
- Location: Dundalk, County Louth, Ireland
- Ground: Mill Road (Capacity: 1,000)
- President: Kenneth Dorian
- Coach: Tommy Campbell
- Captain: Ultan Murphy
- League: Leinster League Division 1A
- 2025–26: Leinster League Division 1B; 1st of 8 (promoted)
Team kit

Official website
- www.dundalkrfc.ie

Dundalk Rugby Football Club (/dʌnˈdɔː(l)k/ dun-DAW(L)K) is an amateur Irish rugby union club from Dundalk, County Louth. The men's team compete in Division 1A of the Leinster League.

The club was established in 1877 and became a founder member of the Provincial Towns Union, which then merged into what became the Northern Branch of the Irish Rugby Football Union. They later joining the Leinster branch of the IRFU. They have been a junior club throughout their existence, with the exception of the 2015–16 season when they competed in Division 2C of the All-Ireland League.

Their first tournament win was a Leinster Junior Cup victory in 1908–09. They won their first Leinster Towns Cup in 1931–32 and have won the competition ten times, with the most recent victory coming in 2010–11. They have been Leinster League Division 1 winners twice, in 1994–95 and in 2014–15.

They moved to their present home ground at Mill Road in 1967, having previously played at Ballymascanlon. In earlier years, matches were played at a number of grounds in the town, including the grounds at Dundalk Grammar School, the Polo Field, Mount Avenue, and the Athletic Grounds. The team has played in black and white hooped shirts with white or black shorts since its reformation in 1906. The club's crest is based on the town's coat of arms.

== History ==
=== Origins (1877–1912) ===
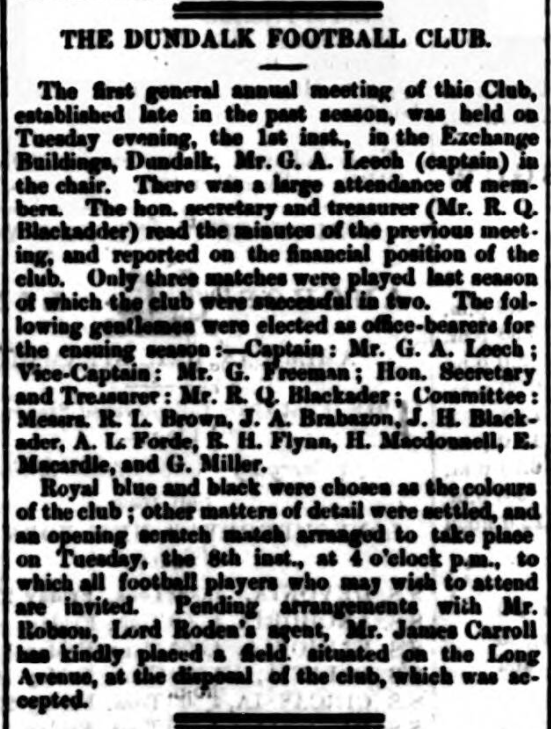
Report in Dundalk Herald of the first annual meeting of Dundalk R.F.C., 5 October 1878

Dundalk R.F.C. was established as 'Dundalk Football Club' in 1877–78 by a group of 'gentleman amateurs' from the town's merchant and professional classes, most of whom were already active in other local amateur clubs founded in the 1870s such as the cricket club, the rowing and sailing clubs, the rifle association, and the cycling club. Founder members included Graves A. Leech (the club's first captain) and Robert Q. Blackader (the club's first Secretary and Treasurer). It is known that the club was established in either late 1877 or early 1878 because of a report of its first annual meeting appearing in the Dundalk Herald of 5 October 1878, which states that the club was "established late in the past season". The first recorded visit of an established team to the town was that of Wanderers on 8 March 1879, which was played at the Pigeon House Field (a division of the Demesne).

Dundalk were founder members of the Provincial Towns Rugby Football Union in 1882 alongside Armagh, Bessbrook, Derry, and Dungannon. This union then voted to become a branch of the Irish Rugby Football Union in 1884. Dundalk (and another club formed at the Great Northern Railway works in the town in 1884) competed in the Provincial Towns Cup (the competition that later became the Ulster Towns Cup, and not the Leinster-based competition of the same name). The rise of the G.A.A. and Gaelic football in the late 1880s, together with the departure from the town of some of the club's leading members (including Robert Blackader, now the club president, and his replacement as club captain and Secretary, T.J.E. Ashley) saw it decline. But Ireland's first Triple Crown in 1894, together with the "dying out" of the "Gaelic craze", saw the enthusiasm for rugby pick up, and the club was reorganised as 'Dundalk Rugby Football Club' for 1894–95. That season, they reached the final of the (Ulster) Provincial Towns Cup for the first time and were defeated by Dungannon at the Dundalk Athletic Grounds. Dundalk successfully protested that Dungannon had fielded ineligible players and the game was replayed in Dungannon, with Dungannon again winning.

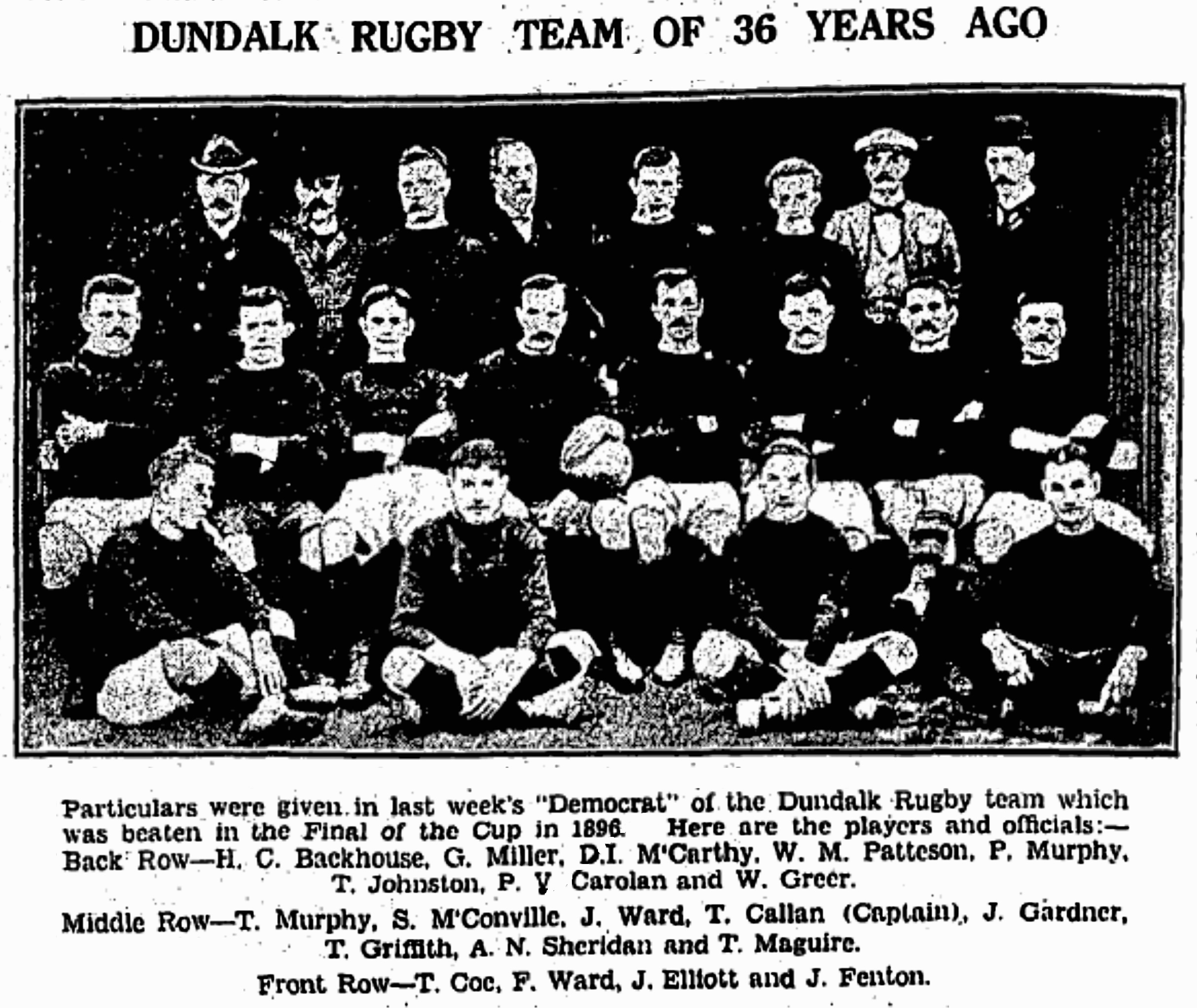
Dundalk R.F.C. 1894–95, reprinted in Dundalk Democrat, 16 April 1932

In the following seasons the club was only sporadically active, and by 1903 had become dormant while G.N.R. had switched codes to association football. The club was revived in 1906 under the presidency of Henry C. Backhouse, adopted colours of black and white striped shirts, and moved to play in Leinster competition exclusively. They won their first honour in the 1908–09 season when they defeated St Mary's College in a replay to win the Leinster Junior Challenge Cup for the only time. They reached the final again the following year but were defeated by Merrion in a replay.

=== Re-establishment and success (1922–1967) ===
The club subsequently declined again and it did not begin the 1912–13 season, most likely because of a lack of playing members as Gaelic football had again become the dominant footballing code in north Louth. Led by the efforts of Frank Corr, who became honorary secretary, it was re-established in 1922. The re-established club's president was Paul V. Carolan, who had also been its president in the 1890s, while other committee members with connections going back to the 1880s and 1890s included Henry C. Backhouse, John M. Cox, and Augustine N. Sheridan.

In 1932, they won their first Provincial Towns Cup (which had been reorganised from the Leinster Junior Challenge Cup in 1925), defeating Longford on a 7–0 scoreline at Lansdowne Road. They contested 10 more finals between 1936 and 1949, winning six—in 1936–37, 1938–39, 1944–45, and then three in a row in 1946–47, 1947–48, and 1948–49. The rugby team's 1949 Towns Cup victory was nearly part of a unique sporting treble for the town that weekend, with Dundalk F.C. winning that season's FAI Cup final the next day. But in Gaelic football, Louth were defeated in the National League final.

Dundalk also won the Ryan Midland Cup (a competition run between 1927–28 and 1940–41) twice during this period—in 1934–35 (the first year they were invited to enter) and again in 1936–37. The latter victory resulted in a 'cup double' for the club to go with that season's Towns Cup win. But the 1937 final became notorious subsequently because the IRFU had attempted to postpone it but apparently did not tell the two teams competing—Dundalk and Birr. Both teams turned up at Lansdowne Road on the day but no match referee was present. The match went ahead with the president of the Dundalk club taking charge, but it was ended by an IRFU official after 50 minutes with Dundalk leading 7–0 because the same day's Bateman Cup final was due to start. The 1950s and 1960s were comparatively lean for Dundalk with no further appearances in a Towns Cup decider.

=== New home and more success (1967–2000) ===
The club moved to its present home ground at Mill Road in 1967 and the official opening came two years later after a £20,000 investment in the pitches and a new pavilion. That season, 1969–70, Dundalk reached the Towns Cup final for the first time in 21 years and defeated Navan, 8–3, to win the Cup for the eighth time.

They won the McGowan League (a North Leinster regional competition) for the first time in 1976–77. The following season, the club initiated a new tournament called the Blackstock Trophy, named after former club president, Reggie Blackstock. It was intended to be an annual inter-provincial tournament contested by Dundalk, Ennis, Lisburn, and Ballina and hosted by each club on rotation. Dundalk won in 1978 and won again in 1983, which was also the final edition of the tournament. Also in 1983–84, they won the McGowan League for the second time. The following season, 1984–85, they won the Portadown Floodlit Tournament (known as the 'Nutty-Krust Cup' for sponsorship purposes). A third McGowan League was won in 1985–86, which qualified Dundalk for the 1986 Roscrea Festival of Rugby—a 16-team junior rugby tournament that Dundalk went on to win.

1986–87 would be the club's most successful season in its history to that point. Having already won the Roscrea festival, they then retained the McGowan League for the first time and reached the final of the Leinster Junior 1 League. They lost 10–6 to Lansdowne seconds, which cost them a place in the following season's Leinster Senior League. However, they had also reached the Towns Cup final for the first time since 1970 and they won the Cup for the ninth time with a 13–6 victory over Kilkenny. In 1992–93, they reached a second Junior 1 League final where they lost to St Mary's. But they won a fifth McGowan League title the same season, and retained it the following year.

After the creation of the All-Ireland League (AIL), the IRFU formed new leagues for junior sides. The Leinster League was formed in 1994–95, replacing the Junior 1 League, and Dundalk were the inaugural winners of the Division One title, but automatic promotion to the AIL was not introduced until the following season. The following season, under the New Zealander player-coach, Mark Benton, they won the Nutty Krust Cup for a second time. In the Leinster League, they were pipped to the title by Suttonians on points-difference. Suttonians were then promoted to the AIL.

=== Modern era (2000–present day) ===
The new Leinster League competition meant that the existing junior rugby competitions that the club had entered in previous years either faded away or were reorganised as youths tournaments. Subsequently, Dundalk went through another lean period in both the Towns Cup and the Leinster League, with only a losing Towns Cup final appearance in 2000, before they won the Cup for the tenth time in 2011, with a 35–20 victory over Tullamore.

They finished top of Division 1A of the Leinster League in 2014–15 under player-coach Ene Fa'atau (brother of Samoa international Lome Fa'atau). This win ensured qualification for a 'round robin' tournament between the four provincial league winners, in which two clubs would be promoted to the All-Ireland League Division 2C for 2015–16. Dundalk defeated De La Salle Palmerstown 22–10 to secure promotion, thus becoming a 'senior' club for the first time. The same season they won the McGowan Cup for the first time since 1993–94 (the competition having undergone several format changes since the formation of the Leinster League), and the All-Ireland Junior Cup for the first time (the club's first national title in its history), defeating Bangor in the final, 55–5. Fa'atau left at the end of the season and in their first season in the All-Ireland League, Dundalk struggled to compete and were relegated to Leinster League Division 1A again for 2016–17.

The 2019–20 playing season was suspended and ultimately cancelled as a result of the COVID-19 pandemic. The 2020–21 season was also cancelled. The 2021–22 season saw the club relegated from the top-tier of the Leinster League for the first time. They won Division 1B in the 2025–26 season and were promoted to Division 1A.

== Colours and crest ==
Dundalk's colours have been black and white hooped shirts with white shorts and black and white socks since the club was reformed in 1906. Black shorts instead of white were first introduced in the 1990s. The colours originally adopted by the club at its first annual meeting in 1878 were royal blue and black.

The club badge consists of the coat of arms of the town of Dundalk emblazoned on a silver badge with the club name and year of establishment. The Coat of Arms of Dundalk was officially granted by the Office of the Chief Herald at the National Library of Ireland in 1968, and is a replication of the Seal Matrix of the 'New Town of Dundalk', which itself dates to the 14th Century.

=== Kit suppliers and sponsors ===
Dundalk's kit supplier is Canterbury of New Zealand. The main shirt sponsor for the senior men's team is Kilsaran Concrete.

Away colours

Dundalk do not typically require away colours. However, in the 2018–19 season, a once-off pink shirt was commissioned to support breast cancer research and Louth Palliative Care in tribute to Caroline Gray, wife of Dundalk player Jonathan Gray, who had died following the illness. The logo of Breast Cancer Research was used in place of the official sponsor for the shirts.

== Home grounds ==
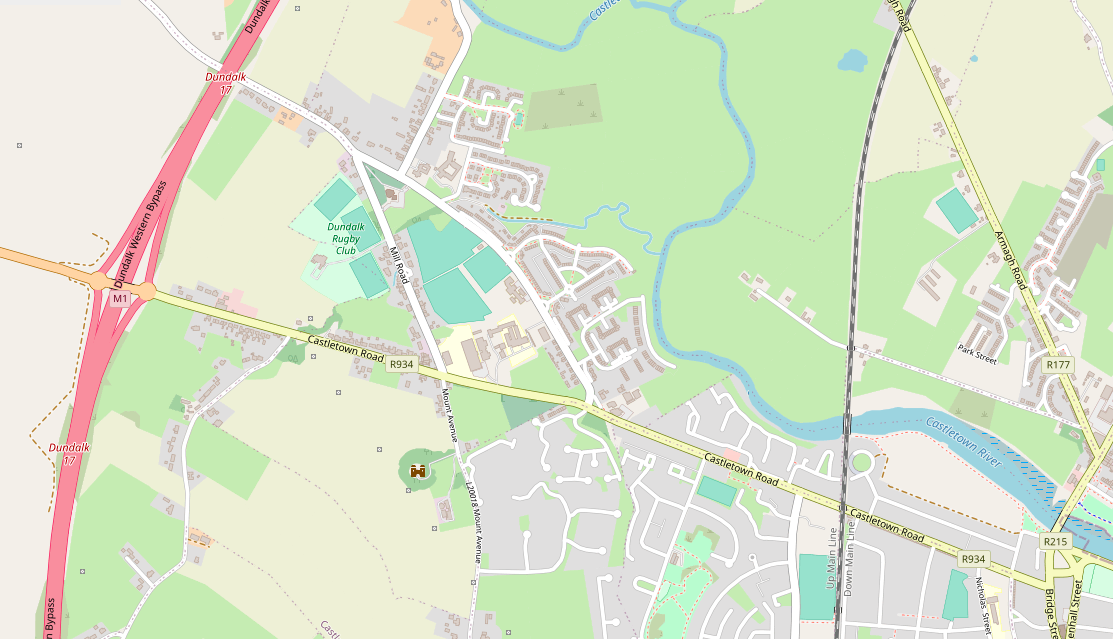
Location of Mill Road playing grounds, home of Dundalk R.F.C.

The club has had a number of home grounds during its history. At first, it played at the Pigeon House Field at the Demesne then, in the late 1800s, it mostly played at the grounds of the Dundalk Educational Institution (now Dundalk Grammar School) or the Dundalk Athletic Grounds. The Athletic Grounds were owned and rented out by the Dundalk Young Ireland's Athletic Grounds Company for cricket, Gaelic games, and athletics, as well as football and rugby. When the club reformed in 1906, it opted for the Polo Field—another division of the Demesne. After being re-established in 1922, the club again played at the Grammar School Grounds then moved to Mount Avenue before the end of the decade. It remained there for the 1930s before returning to the Athletic Grounds for most of the 1940s and 1950s. After the closure of the Athletic Grounds in 1960, the club based itself at the grounds of the Ballymascanlon House Hotel until it secured land of its own at Mill Road in 1967 when Club President Don McDonough bought 17 acres of land. The official opening took place in September 1969 when the local side played a Wolfhounds XV. Floodlights were first installed at the ground in 1972.

The Mill Road playing grounds are 3 km from the Market Square in the town centre. By road, the grounds are reached from Exit 17 off the M1 onto the Castletown Road (N53). The grounds are 1.3 km from Exit 17. By bus, Route 162 from Dundalk to Monaghan stops at the junction of the Castletown Road and Mill Road. Since 2014, Mill Road has also served as the home field for American football side Louth Mavericks.

== Rivalries ==
Dundalk have played an annual pre-season friendly against Belfast club Church of Ireland Young Men's Society (CIYMS) R.F.C. since 1947, for which the Lockington Cup is awarded.

The club also played an annual friendly against Portadown called the Rainey Cup from 1961 until 1988. The fixture became intermittent subsequently and was played for the final time in 1996 because of the busier playing schedules caused by the introduction of the All Ireland and provincial leagues in the early 1990s. When the two clubs met in an All-Ireland Junior Cup quarter-final in 2013, the trophy was awarded to the victorious Portadown side but plans to renew the annual contest did not materialise.

The Louth Derby is contested between Dundalk and fellow Leinster League side Boyne from Drogheda.

== Players ==
=== Teams ===
In addition to the men's first fifteen, the club has a second team and, in some seasons, a third team. Boys teams are fielded at four age brackets between Under-12 (U12) and U19, depending on the age profile of the club's youth members. Girls teams are fielded at U15 and U18 level. Dundalk also cater for children's teams between U8 and U12 at academy level—'the Sharks'.

=== Notable players ===
Players capped for Ireland who have played for Dundalk

- (Ireland) Frederick William Kidd (3 caps)
- (Ireland) William Cox Neville (2 caps)
- (Ireland) Colm Callan (10 caps)
- (Ireland) Eamonn McGuire (8 caps)

== First XV honours ==
- All-Ireland Junior Cup: 1
  - 2014–15
- Leinster League: 2
  - 1994–95, 2014–15
- Leinster League Division 1B: 1
  - 2025-26
- Leinster Towns Cup: 10
  - 1931–32, 1936–37, 1938–39, 1944–45, 1946–47, 1947–48, 1948–49, 1969–70, 1986–87, 2010–11
- Leinster Junior Challenge Cup: 1
  - 1908–09
- McGowan League/Cup: 8
  - 1976–77, 1983–84, 1985–86, 1986–87, 1992–93, 1993–1994, 2014–15, 2023–24
- Nutty Krust Cup: 2
  - 1984–85, 1995–96
- Ryan Cup: 2
  - 1934–35, 1936–37
