= Seamus Kelly (rugby union, born 1931) =

Rugby player (1931–2012)

- Born: 15 March 1931 Wexford, Ireland
- Died: 9 September 2012 (aged 81) Ferrybank, Wexford, Ireland
- School: Clongowes Wood College

Rugby union career
- Position: Out-half
International career
Years	Team	Apps	(Points)
1954–60	Ireland	5	(12)

Seamus Kelly (15 March 1931 – 9 September 2012) was an Irish international rugby union player.

A Wexford native, Kelly developed his game at hometown club Wexford Wanderers and during his time in schoolboy rugby at Clongowes Wood College. He was an out-half and played with Dublin club Lansdowne through the 1950s. His goal-kicking prowess saw him accumulate over 1,000 points in senior rugby, the first Irish player to achieve this feat.

Kelly's career coincided with Jack Kyle's time as Ireland out-half, which limited his international opportunities. He appeared sporadically between 1954 and 1960, debuting in a Five Nations win over Scotland at Ravenhill, to become the first national player to come from Wexford. Capped five times, Kelly scored a total of 12 points, with four penalties.

== See also ==
- List of Ireland national rugby union players
