= 2026 IRFU Women's Interprovincial Series =

Irish rugby union competition

2026 Vodafone Women's Interprovincial Championship
- Number of teams: 4 Connacht; Leinster; Munster; Ulster
- Champions: Munster (17th title)
- Runners-up: Leinster
- Matches played: 8
- Tries scored: 64 (average 8 per match)
- Top try scorer: Beth Buttimer (Munster) – 8

Official website
- www.irishrugby.ie

Location of IRFU Women's Interprovincial Series Provinces:
Republic of Ireland Northern Ireland

The 2026 IRFU Women's Interprovincial Series was contested by women's teams representing the four provincial rugby unions of Ireland, under the same branding and uniforms as the senior men's teams in the United Rugby Championship. The competition used a single round-robin format, similar to the one used in both the Six Nations Championship and the Women's Six Nations Championship. Each team played the other three teams once, with the fixtures reversed from the 2025 edition. Unlike the Six Nations, but as in previous seasons of the Interprovincial Series, the competition also featured a playoff final.

The fixture schedule was confirmed in May 2026, with all matches once again streamed live on the Spórt TG4 YouTube channel and the finals day staged at Dexcom Stadium in Galway. In contrast to 2025, when the Irish national squad was away at the 2025 Women's Rugby World Cup, the 2026 edition saw a large number of Ireland internationals return to provincial duty ahead of the WXV Global Series, while all four provinces had new faces on their coaching tickets: Sana Govender took charge of Leinster and Craig Hansberry of Connacht.

Munster retained the title, winning a record seventeenth championship with a 100% record. Having beaten Leinster 39–19 in the opening round, they won a tight final 14–5 against the same opposition, with hooker Beth Buttimer scoring both tries and finishing as the tournament's top try scorer with eight. Ulster finished third, beating hosts Connacht 29–10 in the play-off at Dexcom Stadium for their first win of the championship, and their first Interprovincial victory since 2023.

== Regular series ==
=== Round 1 ===
8 August 2026
2:30pm

(1 BP) Munster Women (Ireland)	39–19	(Ireland) Leinster Women
Try: Beth Buttimer (4), Alana McInerney, Eilís Cahill, Katie Corrigan; Con: Caitríona Finn (2)	Report	Try: Sarah Delaney, Erin King, Hannah Wilson; Con: Dannah O'Brien (2)

Virgin Media Park, Cork

8 August 2026
4:15pm

Ulster Women (Ireland)	10–15	(Ireland) Connacht Women
Try: Sophie Barrett	Report	Try: Anna McGann (2); Con: Méabh Deely; Pen: Deely

Affidea Stadium, Belfast

=== Round 2 ===
15 August 2026
2:30pm

(1 BP) Munster Women (Ireland)	62–0	(Ireland) Ulster Women
Try: Chisom Ugwueru; Clodagh O'Halloran (2); Beth Buttimer (2); Katie Corrigan; Emily Lane; Aoife Corey; Alana McInerney; Andrea Murphy; Con: Enya Breen (3); Caitríona Finn (3)	Report

Virgin Media Park, Cork

15 August 2026
4:30pm

(1 BP) Leinster Women (Ireland)	36–21	(Ireland) Connacht Women
Try: Maggie Boylan (2); Hannah Wilson; Emma Tilly; Stacey Flood; Niamh Murphy; Con: Dannah O'Brien (3)	Report	Try: Aoibheann Reilly (2); Stacy Hanley; Con: Méabh Deely (3)

Energia Park, Dublin

=== Round 3 ===
22 August 2026
2:30pm

Ulster Women (Ireland)	5–75	(Ireland) Leinster Women (1 BP)
Try: Olivia McKinley	Report	Try: Robyn O'Connor (4); Katie Whelan (4); Vicky Elmes Kinlan (11 tries in total)

Affidea Stadium, Belfast

22 August 2026
4:15pm

Connacht Women (Ireland)	12–47	(Ireland) Munster Women (1 BP)
Try: Uillin Eilian; Jemima Adams Verling; Con: Síofra Hession (1)	Report	Try: Alana McInerney (3); Alisha Flynn (2); Caitríona Finn; Abbie Salter-Townshend; Con: Finn (6)

Dexcom Stadium, Galway

== Table ==
Pos	Team	Pld	W	D	L	PF	PA	PD	TF	TA	TB	LB	Pts	Qualification or relegation
1	Munster Women (CH)	3	3	0	0	148	31	+117	24	5	3	0	15	Qualified for Interprovincial final
2	Leinster Women (RU)	3	2	0	1	130	65	+65	20	11	2	0	10	Qualified for Interprovincial final
3	Connacht Women	3	1	0	2	48	93	−45	7	15	0	0	4	Qualified for third/fourth place final
4	Ulster Women	3	0	0	3	15	152	−137	3	23	0	1	1	Qualified for third/fourth place final

Updated to match(es) played on 22 August 2026. Source: irishrugby.ie
Rules for classification: 1) competition points; 2) match points difference; 3) match points for

== Finals day ==
Third/Fourth play-off

29 August 2026
2:00pm

Connacht Women (Ireland)	10–29	(Ireland) Ulster Women
Try: Aoife Heaney; Méabh Deely	Report	Try: Olivia McKinley; Maebh Clenaghan (2); Niamh Marley; Siobhán Sheerin; Con: Abby Moyles (2/5)

Dexcom Stadium, Galway
Referee: Robbie Jenkinson (Ireland)

Women's Interprovincial Final

29 August 2026
4:30pm

Munster Women (Ireland)	14–5	(Ireland) Leinster Women
Try: Beth Buttimer (2); Con: Caitríona Finn (1); Enya Breen (1)	Report	Try: Kathy Baker

Dexcom Stadium, Galway

== Provinces ==
Team	Coach / Director of Rugby	Captain	Stadium	City	Capacity
Connacht Rugby	Craig Hansberry	Aoibheann Reilly / Ailish Quinn (co-captains)	Dexcom Stadium	Galway	12,500
Leinster Rugby	Sana Govender	Sarah Delaney	Energia Park	Dublin	6,000
Munster Rugby	Matt Brown	Maeve Óg O'Leary	Virgin Media Park	Cork	8,008
Ulster Rugby	Neil Alcorn	India Daley	Affidea Stadium	Belfast	18,196 (9,000 seated)
