= Leinster Junior Challenge Cup =

The Leinster Junior Challenge Cup was the forerunner of the Leinster Towns Cup. The cup was established in 1888.

It was established as a competition for clubs below senior level who were affiliated to the Leinster branch of the Irish Rugby Football Union. The first competition was played during the 1888-1889 season.

The conditions of the competition were changed for 1926 competition and only teams who were located at least 18 miles from the General Post Office in O'Connell Street were eligible to compete.

== Past winners ==
- 1889 Blackrock College P & P
- 1890 Santry
- 1891 Ranelagh School
- 1892 Blackrock College P & P
- 1893 Blackrock College P & P
- 1894 Old Wesley
- 1895 Old Wesley
- 1896 General Post Office F.C.
- 1897 General Post Office F.C.
- 1898 Blackrock College P & P
- 1899 Blackrock College P & P
- 1900 Clontarf
- 1901 Santry RFC
- 1902 R.I.C. RFC
- 1903 R.I.C. RFC
- 1904 Co Carlow
- 1905 St Mary's College RFC
- 1906 R.I.C. RFC
- 1907 St Mary's College RFC
- 1908 St Mary's College RFC
- 1909 Dundalk
- 1910 Merrion
- 1911 St Mary's College RFC
- 1912 Co Carlow
- 1913 Co Carlow
- 1914 University College Dublin RFC
- 1915
- 1916
- 1917
- 1918
- 1919 Co Carlow
- 1920 Kilkenny
- 1921 Railway Union
- 1922 Co Carlow
- 1923 Enniscorthy
- 1924 County Kildare (Naas)
- 1925 Enniscorthy RFC beat Naas 10-3

== See also ==
- Leinster Rugby
- Rugby union in Ireland
