= County Carlow Football Club =

Irish rugby union club based in Carlow, Co.Carlow

(Ireland) Co Carlow Football Club
- Full name: Co Carlow Football Club
- Union: IRFU; Leinster
- Founded: 1873; 153 years ago
- Ground: Oak Park, County Carlow (Capacity: ~400)
- President: Adam Kavanagh
- Coach: Dave Barron
- League: Leinster League
1st kit	2nd kit

Official website
- www.carlowrugby.ie

County Carlow Football Club is a rugby union club in Carlow, Ireland, playing in Division 1B of the Leinster League. The club was founded in October 1873, and is one of the oldest rugby clubs in Ireland. As was usual in the days preceding the development of Gaelic football and soccer and prior to the foundation of the Rugby Football Union, the earlier clubs were known simply as "football clubs" with no mention of rugby in the title. The County Carlow club was formed, therefore, (and is correctly known) as "County Carlow Football Club".

== History ==
The club was constituted at a meeting in the Club House Hotel, Carlow in October 1873. It was to be known as the County Carlow Football Club. The founder, Colonel Horace Rochfort of Clogrennan, County Carlow, was elected the first president. The club colours were registered as black and amber. Colonel Rochfort, a landowner of approximately 3,000 acres (12 km^{2}) in counties Dublin, Laois and Carlow, was a keen sportsman of the time. He was also the founder of the County Carlow Cricket Club in 1831, and the founder and first secretary of the All Ireland Polo Club in the Phoenix Park, Dublin, in 1873, having founded the County Carlow Polo Club in 1872.

County Carlow Football Club played unofficially for the first 25 years of its existence, with Trinity (Dublin University), Wanderers and Kingstown providing the most frequent early opposition. Fixtures with Bective and Lansdowne were recorded in the 1880s, and in the late 1880s the formation of Athy, Baltinglass, Carlow College (1882) and Portarlington College provided an alternative opposition to the Dublin clubs and heralded the early days of provincial rugby.

Affiliation of County Carlow FC to the Leinster Branch of the IRFU was achieved on 1 December 1899 when it was proposed by T.Thornhill of Wanderers and seconded by J.B. Moore of Lansdowne. Hence the club became eligible to compete in the Leinster Junior Challenge Cup, which they won in 1904, becoming the first provincial club to do so. County Carlow FC won the Junior Cup on four subsequent occasions before the competition was restructured to become the Provincial Towns Cup in 1926.

County Carlow FC have appeared in 16 finals of the Provincial Towns Cup and were victorious on 12 occasions - (the most appearances and the most wins by any club). In 1997, they became the first club ever to achieve the Provincial Cup and League double. The Provincial League win of that year earned them a place in the All Ireland Round Robin qualifier competition with Midleton (Munster), Connemara (Connaught) and Omagh Academicals (Ulster). County Carlow won the play off, and became a senior club for the first time in its history for the 1997/1998 season.

In 1997/1998 - their first season as a senior club - County Carlow FC won Division 4 of the All Ireland League. Promotion to Division 2 was achieved two years later, and by the end of the 2000/2001 season they attained Division 1 status, finishing second in Division 2 to UCD.

Historically, County Carlow FC won the Leinster Senior Cup in 2003, becoming the only club to have won both the Provincial Towns Cup and the Leinster Senior Cup. The win in 2003 was also the first time in the 120-year history of the competition that the Leinster Senior Cup was won by a non-Dublin club. This historic win was repeated in 2004 when County Carlow FC recorded back to back wins, beating DLS Palmerston in the final on both occasions.

County Carlow FC played for 5 consecutive seasons in Division 1 but were relegated to Division 2 for the 2006/2007 season and subsequently to Division 3 for the 2007/2008 season. The club currently plays in Division 1B of the Leinster Senior League.

== Club honours ==
- Leinster Senior Cup (2) 2003, 2004
- AIB League Division 4 (1) 1998
- Navan 10-a-side (1) 2002
- Leinster Junior Challenge Cup (5) 1904, 1912, 1913, 1919, 1922
- Provincial Towns Cup (12) 1929, 1931, 1933, 1957, 1961, 1965, 1977, 1992, 1993, 1994, 1996, 1997
- Provincial Towns Plate (4) 1964, 1968, 1971, 1973
- South East Cup (8) 1975, 1976, 1985, 1988, 1990, 1991, 1992, 1996
- IRFU Award Top Club in Leinster 1993
- IRFU Award Top non-league club in Ireland 1997
