= Wicklow RFC =

Irish rugby union club based in Wicklow, Co.Wicklow

(Ireland) Wicklow
- Full name: Wicklow Rugby Football Club
- Union: IRFU; Leinster
- Founded: 1963; 63 years ago
- Ground: Ashtown Lane
- Chairman: Duncan Duke
- President: Brian Clarke
- Coaches: Dan Van Zyl (men); Jason Moreton (women)

Wicklow RFC is an Irish rugby union team based in Wicklow, Leinster, playing in Division 1A of the Leinster League. Apart from the First XV (Junior 1), the club also fields a Second XV (Junior 2), Third XV (Anderson Cup), U19, U17, U15, U14, U13. Senior women 1st XV play in the AIL the top league in the country and 2nd team in Division 4a Leinster league. Girls U18, U16 and U14s sides and a mini-rugby section.

== Honours ==
- Leinster Towns Cup: 1
  - 2015-16
