= Tullamore RFC =

Irish rugby union club based in Tullamore, Co.Offaly

Tullamore
- Full name: Tullamore Rugby Football Club
- Union: (Ireland) IRFU
- Branch: Leinster
- Nickname: Tulliers
- Founded: 1937; 89 years ago
- Ground(s): Spollanstown, Tullamore
- Chairman: Jimmy Martin
- President: Robbie Champ
- Director of Rugby: Paul Wrafter
- Coach(es): Johan Taylor, Kevin Finlay
- Captain: Colm Heffernan
- League: Leinster League Div 1a
- 2024–25: 10th - Relegated
Team kit

Official website
- www.tullamorerugby.com

Tullamore RFC is an Irish rugby union team based in Tullamore, County Offaly, playing in Division 1a of the Leinster League

== History ==
On Sunday 16 January 1927 a scrap team from Tullamore was sent to Edenderry only to be beaten. Tullamore R.F.C. was formed at a meeting on Saturday 5 February 1927. Mr. Danny Williams was elected president. The club appears to have held "Practices" each Wednesday, Saturday and Sunday at grounds on Arden Road. The first annual Dinner Dance was held at the end of the 1927–1928 season. Although the club was attracting a good following, this was its last season. With a club in Kilbeggan proving more successful the Tullamore players joined up with their friends in Kilbeggan.

=== Founding a Club ===
The present club was founded after a match at Derrinturn between Carberry and Tullamore. It was decided to hold a general meeting, which was held in Colton's hotel on Monday 19 April 1937. The honour of being the first president of the new club was bestowed on Dr. J. M. Prior Kennedy. Tullamore opened their first season in October with a game away to Birr at half-time Tullamore were leading 6-0 but in the end had to give way and were beaten 8–6. Of the 20 games played that season Tullamore won 6, Lost 11 and drew 3.

=== Town's Cup Success ===
From the 1937–38 season to 1946 Tullamore were five times in the Semi-final of the Provincial Towns Cup and victory coming eventually in 1946, defeating Skerries in the final.

Fourteen years passed before Tullamore repeated its 1946 performance and won the cup again. On 10 April 1960 Tullamore defeated Wexford 17–8 in Kilkenny in the final. At the victory Dinner, held in Spollanstown a perpetual trophy was presented by Dermot Kilroy and Oliver McGlinchey that was to be known as the Midland Shield for use in the Midland League Competition. The 1960s was memorable for what happened off the pitch and not on it. After several years of negotiations, offers acceptances and fresh proposals the Tullamore rugby club took over Spollanstown. A final settlement was reached with the Tullamore soccer club in 1970. The Provincial Towns Cup was won again in 1976 and they qualified for the play-off in the Senior Cup. The main man in the cup final win over Drogheda was Matt Geraghty the team manager of the 1st team for the 1998–99 season. Tullamore won 9–3. In September 78 the club visited the U.S. Taking in Boston, New York, Buffalo and other centres.

The years up to 1986 do not differ remarkably to the previous years. There were cup victories each year, but none for the 1st XV since the cup of 1976.

=== Youths ===
During the early 70s the club started to take positive steps to promote Juvenile rugby. In October 1974, Oliver McGlinchey with the help of big John Cahill and Denis Magner, two teachers in the town decided that Tullamore RFC needed to produce its own replacement stock for the adult teams. They set about training and coaching the youths of the area, and to date this has been a huge success and the fruits of their labour, as well as other dedicated members, can be admired in the trophy cabinet.

The club now fields U8, U10, U12, U14, U16 and U18 teams and has fielded a number of international players namely, Ronan Kelly, Peter Bracken, Ivan Dunne, Colin Finnerty and Ray Farrell. These players also represented Leinster, as did Paul Marsden, Alan Kerin and Kevin Wynne.

== Honours ==
- All-Ireland Junior Cup : 2008–09, 2011–12, 2012–13
- Leinster League Division Two: 1995/1996
- Provincial Towns Cup: 1946, 1960, 1976, 2006
- Provincial Towns Seconds Cup: 1968, 1992, 2000, 2002
- Anderson Cup (Third XV): 1981, 1986, 1992, 1998
- Dunne Cup (Fourth XV): 1979, 1983, 2000
- Coonan Cup (Fifth XV): 1985, 1992, 1994
- Provincial Third XV League: 1995/1996, 1996/1997
- Provincial Towns Plate: 1990, 1992

== National team players ==
The following Tullamore RFC players have gone on to play for the Ireland national rugby team:

- Jordan Conroy (playing since 2016 for the national sevens team)
- Megan Burns (playing since 2018 for the women's national sevens team)
