= Enniscorthy RFC =

Irish rugby union club based in County Wexford

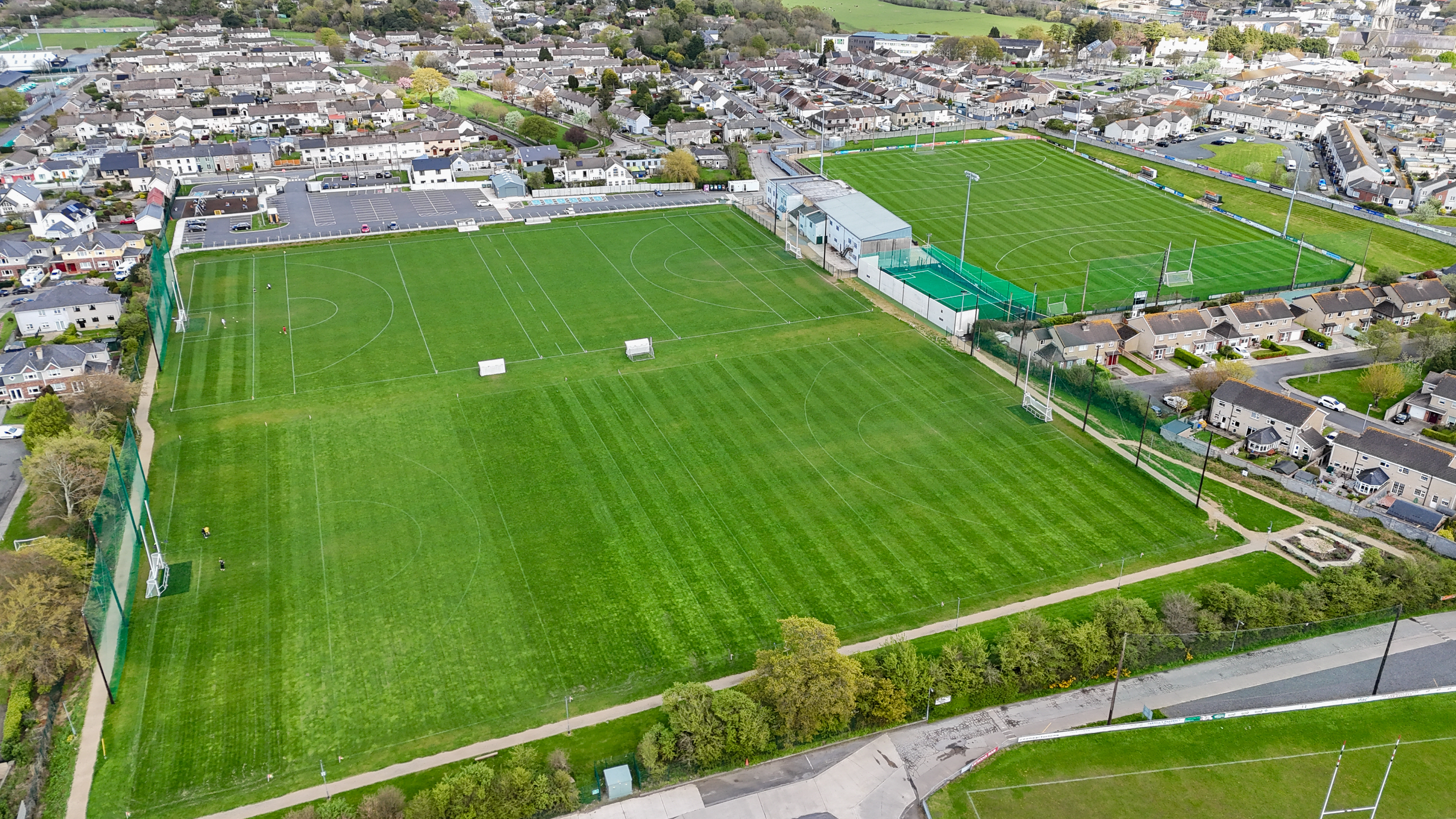
- Full name: Enniscorthy Rugby Football Club
- Union: (Ireland) IRFU
- Branch: Leinster
- Founded: 1912; 114 years ago
- Region: Wexford
- Ground(s): Alcast Park, Enniscorthy
- League: A.I.L. Div. 2C
- 2024–25: 1st - Promoted
Team kit

Official website
- www.enniscorthyrugby.com

Enniscorthy RFC is a rugby union club based in Enniscorthy, County Wexford in Ireland. Founded in 1912, as of 2024 it was playing in Division 2C of the All-Ireland League. The clubhouse and pitch are located on the Ross Road in Enniscorthy.

The club won the last Leinster Junior Challenge Cup in 1925, and went on to win the successor Leinster Rugby Provincial Towns Cup several times, including in 2012, 2015, 2018, and 2019. It has also twice won the All Ireland Junior Cup (in 2014 and 2016).

Enniscorthy RFC was voted "club of the year" at the 2022 Guinness Rugby Writers Awards.
