= Wexford Wanderers RFC =

Irish rugby union club based in County Wexford

(Ireland) Wexford Wanderers
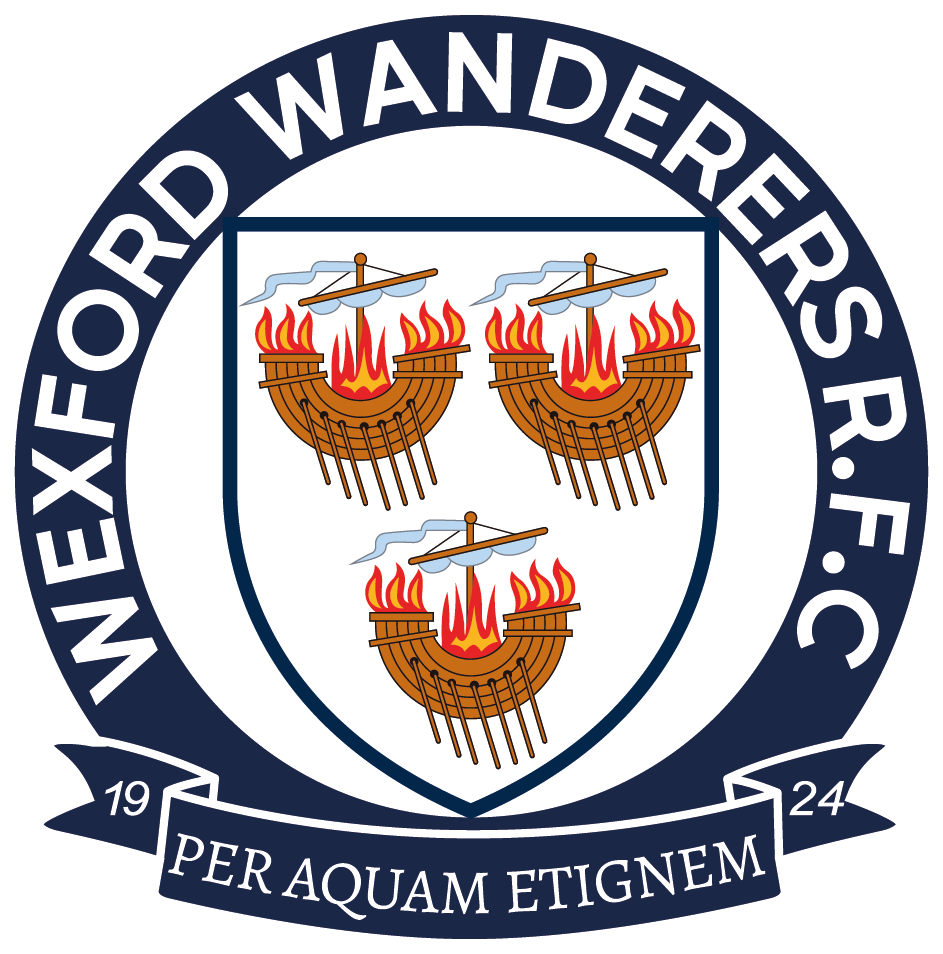
- Full name: Wexford Wanderers Rugby Football Club
- Union: IRFU; Leinster
- Nickname: Wanderers
- Founded: 1924; 102 years ago
- Ground(s): O'Driscolls Park, Park Lane, Wexford
- League: Leinster League 1B (as of 2026)
Team kit

Wexford Wanderers RFC is an Irish rugby union team based in Wexford, County Wexford, playing in Division 1B of the Leinster League. Founded in 1924, the club's colours are blue, white and black. In addition to the first XV and second XV, there are also youth sides from "pre mini", minis (U6s to U12s), and youth (up to U18). Wexford Wanderers also has a women's and girls section with teams from U12 to Senior Women.

Former Leinster and Ireland centre Gordon D'Arcy played youth rugby at the club. Other former male players include Seamus Kelly, Neville Furlong, Jack Stafford, Brian Deeny and Greg McGrath. Robyn O'Connor and Katie Fitzhenry played for both the Irish Women's 15s and 7s teams.

== Honours ==
- Leinster Towns Cup (Provincial Towns Cup): 1930
