= Edenderry RFC =

Irish rugby union club based in Coolavacoose, Co.Kildare

(Ireland) Edenderry
- Full name: Edenderry Rugby Football Club
- Union: IRFU; Leinster
- Nickname: Derry
- Founded: 1951; 75 years ago
- Ground(s): Coolavacoose, Carbury
Team kit

Edenderry RFC is an Irish rugby union team originally based in County Offaly, but now playing in Coolavacoose, Carbury, County Kildare. They play in Division 2A of the Leinster League. The club colours are white and royal blue.

== History ==
Edenderry Rugby Football Club were founded in 1951 in Edenderry, County Offaly. They first started playing on a rugby pitch given to them near the town's golf course. In 1969, Edenderry won the Leinster Provincial Towns Cup. shortly after the victory, the club decided to move grounds across the county border to Carbury in County Kildare with a new clubhouse being constructed in 1974 and extended in 1986. A further fundraising effort to improve the clubhouse was spearheaded by Moss Keane who played with a team of Irish internationals against an Edenderry XV in a charity match in 1990. The renovations were finished in 1999 with the Irish Minister of Finance, Charlie McCreevy and the President of the Irish Rugby Football Union, Billy Lavery opening it.

Edenderry have been used as hosts for the Provincial Towns Cup by the Leinster branch of the IRFU. They have also hosted training sessions for the Leinster Rugby provincial side. In 2018, the IRFU selected Edenderry to host the final of the national All-Ireland Junior Cup. In 2019, Edenderry received a grant of €24,878 to install new floodlights at their ground.
