= Mullingar RFC =

Irish rugby union club based in Mullingar, Co. Westmeath

(Ireland) Mullingar
- Full name: Mullingar Rugby Football Club
- Union: IRFU; Leinster
- Nickname: The Gar
- Founded: 1925; 101 years ago
- Ground(s): Cullion, Mullingar

Mullingar RFC is a rugby union team based in Mullingar, County Westmeath in Ireland. It fields teams in Men's Division 2A of the Leinster League and Women's Leinster Division 2A. The club has three adult teams, as well as children's sections. The club's grounds are located at Shay Murtagh Park, Cullion in Mullingar. The club's colours are scarlet and grey jerseys, navy shorts and red socks.
