= Boyne RFC =

Irish rugby union club in Drogheda, Co. Louth

Boyne RFC is a rugby union team in Drogheda, Ireland, with the men playing in Division 1A of the Leinster League.

== History ==
The club was formed in 1996 by the amalgamation of Drogheda RFC and Delvin RFC.

The 2008–2009 season saw the Boyne 1st team claim Ireland's oldest trophy – the Leinster Towns Cup. The final was held in Ashbourne RFC on 19 April 2009 and Boyne beat their opponents on the day, Tullamore, 27–21. Boyne retained the cup in 2010, again facing Tullamore, winning 32–25.

== Ground changes ==
The club is currently based at Shamrock Lodge rugby grounds in Drogheda, County Louth. There was a proposal to build a new ground which was agreed in principle in recent times. However, as with many other projects this has fallen victim to the global recession and all plans are on ice for the moment.

== All Ireland League (AIL Division 2B) 2011-2017 ==
In 2011 at the business end of the Leinster 1A division Boyne were crowned champions in doing so gaining the club a historic first in becoming a recognized senior club. In an expansion year for the AIL Ulster bank league, four new teams were added one from the premier tier of each province. This meant Boyne were elevated on the final day of the Leinster League 2011. In their maiden escapade through the trials and tribulations of senior rugby Boyne finished 9th in Division 2B made up of sixteen teams from all across the country. After securing safety Boyne managed even more during the 2012/2013 season with ten victories and only five defeats bringing the Drogheda-based club up as high as fifth in the table come the seasons end. With many changes at the club during the summer of 2013 many saw a slightly more difficult season ahead, that is what followed Boyne only winning five and losing ten matches to finish fourteenth in what was their third season playing in the AIL division 2B. The 2014/2015 season followed suit with both changes in personnel on and off the field it took until the new year to rescue a season from certain relegation back to the provincial Leinster league. On the last day of the season Boyne secured their senior status with an away win at Bruff bringing them to thirteenth overall on the table.

=== Division 2C ===
It was agreed by the IRFU in the 2015 summer that instead of four, the divisions would be divided into five creating the Division AIL 2C. Made up of all the teams who were not in the promoted from the previous season and newly promoted and local rivals Dundalk RFC. With a smaller division and both home and away fixtures many saw this as Boyne's opportunity to climb back up the league and bring back success that had eluded them in recent years. This was not the case however despite an opening day victory Boyne only won another six league games losing twelve leaving them eighth in the league just avoiding the playoff relegation and automatic relegation spots. The 2016/2017 season brought about more changes in personnel on and off the field. Opening day wins against Bruff followed by a draw and a victory against Middleton and Seapoint in rounds four and five were not enough to keep Boyne out of trouble come April. Without a win from late October until late March Boynes stay in the All Ireland ranks looked all but over. A late surge brought about by a never say die attitude the club is renowned for gave them a breath of life and brought the season down to a wire. A 25–25 draw against Bruff on the final day of the season let Boyne ride the way one more game as the result brought them above Kanturk RFC on points difference condemning them to automatic relegation and Boyne to a playoff against runners up in the Play-off promotion round robin Omagh RFC. Boynes stay in the national ranks ended at home against Omagh RFC as they went down 29–9 against the Tyrone club. This ended a stay in the AIL that spanned six years.
