= Ashbourne RFC =

Irish rugby union club based in Ashbourne, Co.Meath

Ashbourne
- Full name: Ashbourne Rugby Football Club
- Union: (Ireland) IRFU
- Branch: Leinster
- Nickname: Ash
- Founded: 1974; 52 years ago
- Ground: Milltown
- President: Ham
- Coach: Scott Broughan
Team kit

Ashbourne RFC is an Irish rugby union team based in Ashbourne, County Meath, playing in Division 1A of the Leinster League. The club colours are black and gold. In 2020 the president of Ashbourne was announced as Conor Cunningham Aka Ham; he will act as president for the foreseeable future.

The club's ground at Milltown, Ashbourne, County Meath has hosted Ireland women's national rugby union team international matches.

The club has won the All-Ireland Junior Cup a joint record three times, winning in 2017, 2018 and 2019.
