= Naas RFC =

Irish rugby union club, based in Naas, Co.Kildare

Naas
- Full name: Naas Rugby Football Club
- Union: (Ireland) IRFU
- Branch: Leinster
- Nickname: Cobras
- Founded: 1922; 104 years ago
- Region: Kildare
- Ground(s): Forenaughts, Naas
- Chairman: Denis Murray
- President: Ross Murphy (2025-26)
- League: All-Ireland Div. 1B
- 2024–25: 7th.
Team kit

Official website
- www.naasrugby.com

Naas RFC is an Irish rugby union club based in Naas, Leinster. They play in Division 1B of the All-Ireland League. The club colours are green and white hoops with black shorts and green socks. The Club is the biggest rugby club in Kildare with one of the biggest underage structures in Leinster and 14 LRR referees (May 2025). The club grounds are located at Forenaughts, 2 km to the East of the town.

== History ==
The club was founded in 1881 and reformed in 1922. It was one of the leading Junior Clubs in Irish rugby before attaining All Ireland League Status in the 1999/2000 season. Back then the Club pitches were located in the town in the area where Ashgrove Estate and the Tennis Club are now. Subsequent travels took the Club to Doyle's Field at Tipper East (where the Paddocks estate is now) with the changing rooms being the jockeys room in Naas Racecourse!

In 1974 the Club purchased land at (its current location) Fournaghts, 2 km to the East of Naas town, with the first games taking place there two years later in 1976.

In the 2021/22 season, Naas RFC celebrated its 100th continuous season of playing rugby in Naas.

== Honours ==
- Leinster Senior League: 1
  - 2024-25

== Recent Events ==
The club was awarded Leinster Senior Club of the Year in May 2025.

== Notable players ==
- International players associated with the Club
  - Mark Deering, Seamus Byrne, Frank Byrne, Philip Lawlor, Geordan Murphy, Jamie Heaslip, Adam Byrne, Jamie Osborne
- Ireland national rugby sevens team:
  - Fionn Carr, Billy Dardis Jimmy O'Brien (rugby union) Erin King
- Ireland U20s Internationals
  - Fionn Carr; Adam Byrne; Billy Dardis; Adam Coyle; Jamie Osborne (rugby union), Diarmuid Mangan, Andrew Osborne, Oscar Cawley
- Youth Internationals
  - Kevin Cleary Jr, Joseph Moran, Eoghan Conran, Kaylin Domican, David Lynch (captain), Michael Moran, Enda Daly, Colin McEntee, Micheal Skeleton (Captain), Adam Byrne. Maebh Obrien (7's), Erin King .
- Leinster Youths Representatives
  - Dave Conneran, Enda Daly, Michael Moran, Eoghan Conran, Gavin Dooley, Adam Denvir, Kaylin Domican, Rob Campbell, Daniel O'Byrne, Jared Owens, Adam Byrne, Richard Cronin, Mark Rushe, Joseph Moran, Niall Gorry, Karl Denver, James Morrin, Eoghan Griffin, Colin McEntee, Micheal Skelton, & Adam Coyle, Kevin Mcloughlin and Niall O'Neill . Naas RFC member Patrick Keena was the Manager (2012-2015 ) of the Leinster U18 club side .
- Leinster Girls
  - Emily McKeown, Niamh Hederman, Romy Morin, Chantelle Vitoria, Aoife Hederman, Bev Mahon, Aisling Breslin, Maebh Obrien, Nollaig Maguire, Millie Sheridan, Emma Lackey, Mary Healy, Annie Maguire, Ali Miley, Casey O'Brien, Rachel Murtagh, Katie Maguire, Ellen Murray, Katie Ann O’Neill, Erin King
- 100 AIL Cap Players
  - Andrew Kearney, David Aherne, Johnny Holmes, Johnny Delaney, Henry Bryce, Brian Fitzgerald, Paul Monahan, David Benn, Peter Osborne, Will O Brien, Adam Coyle, Ryan Casey, Fionn Higgins, Pauley Tolofua, Eoin Walsh
- 200 AIL Cap Players
  - Paul Monahan, David Benn

== Success at Naas RFC ==
- Won the Provincial Towns Cup on 3 occasions – 2005, 1998, 1995 and appeared in the final on 10 occasions (Lost 1926, 1935, 1949, 1952, 1954, 1958, 1982).
- Won AIL division 2A in 2016.
- Won the Cup and Leinster League double in 2005, 1998.
- Won 2 Provincial Towns Plates – 1969 and 1981.
- Provincial 2nd XV Cup – 4 wins, 1996, 1999, 2017, 2022
- Anderson Cup - Junior 3rds – 5 wins, 1996, 2002, 2003, 2006, 2014,2016 – joint top winners.
- Dunne Cup - Junior 4ths – 6 wins (record number), 1980, 1993, 1994, 1999, 2004, 2005.
- Leinster League Division 1 Champions – 4 wins, 1997/1998, 1999/2000, 2004/2005, 2006/2007.
- ALL IRELAND PROVINCIAL LEAGUE CHAMPIONS – 2000, 2007.
- Hosie Cup (North Midlands J1) – 10 wins, 1981, 1982, 1988, 1992, 1993, 1995, 1998, 1999, 2005, 2007, 2022
- Lalor Cup (North Midlands J1) – 5 wins, 1978, 1995, 1999, 2000,2025.
- Speirs Cup (North Midlands J3) – 4 wins, 1984, 1992, 1993, 1995.
- Scully Cup (North Midlands J4) – 8 wins, 1992, 1993, 1994, 1997, 1998, 2006, 2008, 2011.
