= Navan R.F.C. =

Irish rugby union club based in Navan, Co.Meath

Navan RFC
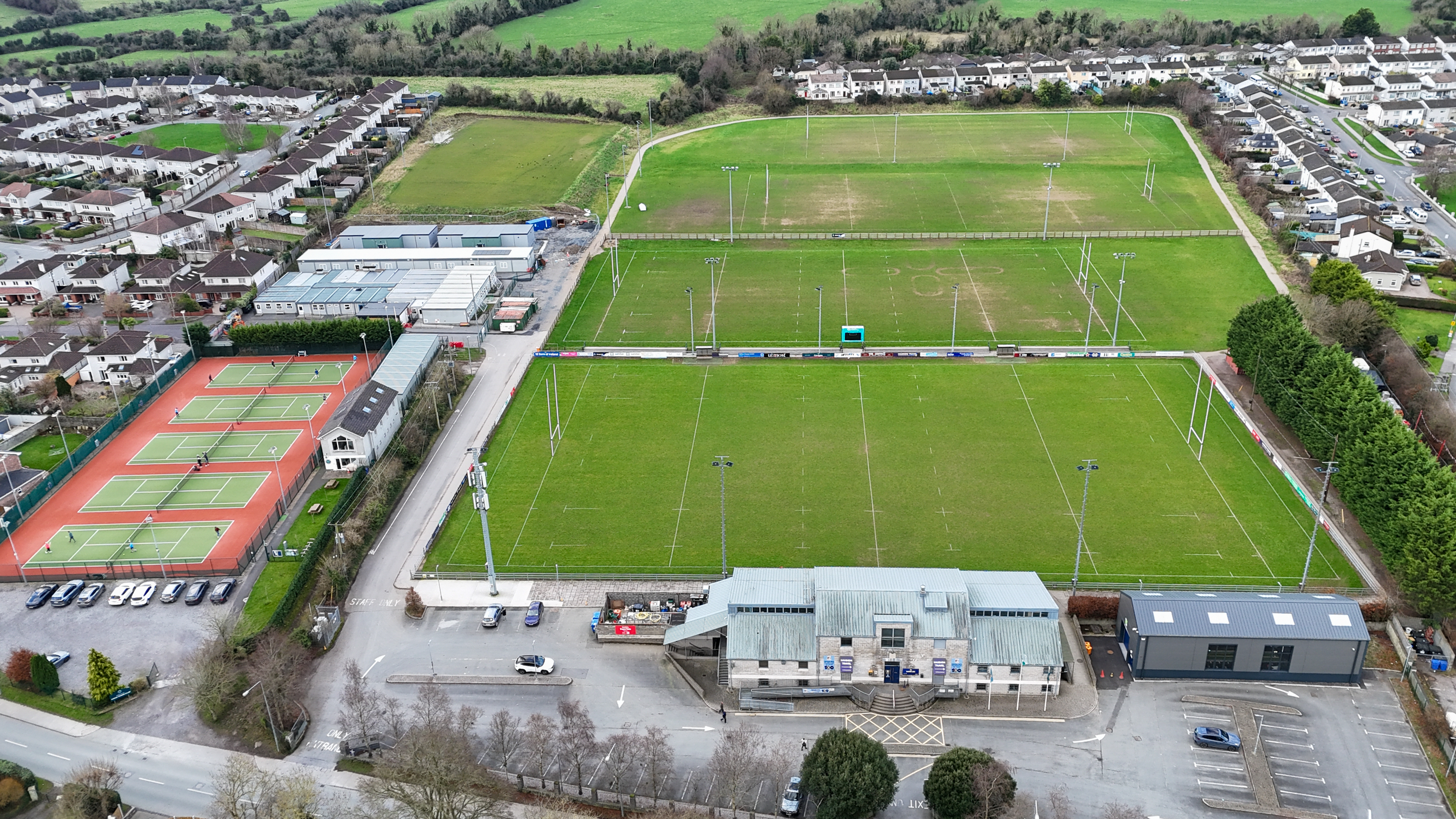
- Full name: Navan Rugby Football Club
- Union: (Ireland) IRFU
- Branch: Leinster
- Founded: 1925; 101 years ago
- Region: Meath
- Ground(s): Balreask Old, Navan (Capacity: 5,000)
- Chairman: Stephen Mackarel
- President: Eddie Lyons
- Coach: Dan van Zyl
- Captain: Ben McEntagart
- League: All-Ireland League Division 2B North
- 2026–27: AIL Div 2B (2025/26) - 9th
Team kit

Official website
- navanrugby.com

Navan Rugby Football Club is an Irish rugby union club, based in Navan, County Meath, Ireland. The senior men's team plays in Division 2B North of the All-Ireland League. The club was founded in 1925.

== History ==
Navan were founded in 1925 and played their first match at the Meath County Showgrounds groundsharing with Navan O'Mahonys GAA. They spent most of their existence in their first forty years as a nomadic club with no fixed home ground. In 1964, the club purchased land in Balreask Old Townland for IR£660 for a permanent rugby pitch and clubhouse. In 2000, the clubhouse was renovated and funded via land sales and through support of the Minister for the Environment. In 2019, Navan received an anonymous donation to fund the erection of new rugby posts.

=== Achievements ===
Navan won their first trophy, the Ryan Cup in 1930. They also won the Provincial Town Cup ten times between 1964 and 2008. Navan won their first Leinster League Division 1A which entered them into the inter-provincial play-offs to enter the All-Ireland League but were unsuccessful in gaining promotion. In 2008 they won their only All-Ireland Junior Cup title. In 2009, they won the Leinster title again and in the play-offs, they defeated City of Derry, Cashel and Monivea to earn qualification into the All-Ireland League for the first time. In 2016, the All-Ireland league was restructured with Navan being placed in Division 2C, the lowest division. Navan won promotion in their first season and also won promotion from Division 2B the next year. In 2019, they won promotion to Division 1B after defeating Queen's University in the promotion play-off.
