= Portlaoise RFC =

Irish rugby union club based in Portlaoise, Co.Laois

(Republic of Ireland) Portlaoise
- Full name: Portlaoise Rugby Football Club
- Union: IRFU; Leinster
- Founded: 1966; 60 years ago
- Ground(s): Togher, Portlaoise
- Chairman: John Brennan
- President: Harry Nicolls
- Coach: Patrick McEvoy

Portlaoise RFC is an Irish rugby union team based in Portlaoise, Leinster, playing in Division 2B of the Leinster League. The club is based just off the N77 in Togher, near the M7 interchange.
