= Leinster League Division Three =

- Founded: 1994
- No. of teams: 14
- Country: Ireland
- Most recent champion: Rathdrum RFC (2007–08)
- Promotion to: Leinster League Division Two

Leinster League Division Three is the third division of the Leinster League and started in the 1994/95 season.

The number of teams was reduced from 14 to 13 in 2007/2008, and again from 13 to 9 in 2008/2009.

== History ==
Ashbourne, Barnhall, Birr, Coolmine, CYM, Delvin, New Ross, Old Kilcullen, Railway Union, Tullow and Wicklow entered the division through the qualifying matches in the 1993/1994 season.

Old Kilcullen later amalgamated with Curragh RFC to form Newbridge and Delvin with Drogheda RFC to form Boyne.

== 2008/2009 Season ==
- Athy
- Balbriggan
- Birr
- CYM
- Malahide
- North Kildare
- Railway Union
- Swords
- Wexford Wanderers

=== 2008/2009 Table ===
2008-2009 Leinster League Division Two League Table
Club	Played	Won	Drawn	Lost	Points for	Points against	Points difference	Bonus Points	Points
North Kildare	6	6	0	0	143	39	104	3	27
Athy	6	6	0	0	121	58	63	0	24
Railway Union	6	4	0	2	139	68	71	2	18
Balbriggan	6	4	0	2	144	98	46	2	18
Wexford Wanderers	6	3	0	3	96	104	−8	1	13
CYM	7	2	0	5	83	133	−50	2	10
Malahide	7	1	1	5	71	135	−64	3	9
Birr	6	1	0	5	39	72	−33	1	5
Swords	6	0	1	5	26	155	−129	0	2
Correct as of 16 November 2008

== 2007/2008 Season ==
- Arklow
- Athy
- Balbriggan
- Birr
- Clane
- Clondalkin
- CYM
- Gorey
- Malahide
- North Kildare
- Rathdrum
- Swords
- Wexford Wanderers

At the end of the season, Arklow, Clane, Clondalkin and Gorey were promoted to Division Two, with Railway Union being relegated from Division Two.

=== 2007/2008 Table ===
2007-2008 Leinster League Division Three League Table
Club	Played	Won	Drawn	Lost	Points for	Points against	Points difference	Bonus Points	Points
Rathdrum	12	11	1	0	321	97	224	8	54
Clane	12	9	1	2	341	80	261	10	48
Gorey	12	9	0	3	205	90	115	5	41
Arklow	12	8	1	3	209	120	89	6	40
Clondalkin	12	8	0	4	308	134	174	6	38
Athy	12	7	1	4	235	82	153	7	37
North Kildare	12	7	0	5	237	193	44	5	33
Swords	12	6	0	6	158	199	−41	3	27
Balbriggan	12	5	0	7	124	251	−127	0	20
Birr	12	3	0	9	110	258	−148	2	14
Wexford Wanderers	12	2	0	10	106	307	−201	1	9
Malahide	12	1	0	11	93	264	−171	2	6
CYM	12	0	0	12	48	420	−372	2	'2
Correct as of 10 March 2008

== 2006/2007 Season ==
- Arklow
- Athboy
- Balbriggan
- Birr
- Clane
- Clondalkin
- CYM
- Gorey
- Longford
- Malahide
- Rathdrum
- Swords
- Tullow
- Wexford Wanderers

At the end of the season, Tullow and Longford were promoted to Division Two. Athboy went to play in the Magee Cup (North East Junior 3).

=== 2006/2007 Table ===
2006-2007 Leinster League Division Three League Table
Club	Played	Won	Drawn	Lost	Points for	Points against	Points difference	Bonus Points	Points
Tullow	13	12	1	337	67	270	8	56	
Longford	13	12	0	1	331	124	207	6	54
Rathdrum	13	11	0	2	301	100	201	7	51
Clondalkin	13	9	1	3	215	132	83	4	42
Clane	13	7	0	6	325	151	174	8	36
Malahide	13	7	1	5	247	207	40	5	35
Balbriggan	13	6	1	6	220	183	37	6	32
Birr	13	6	0	7	126	157	−31	3	27
Arklow	11	5	0	6	135	184	−49	4	24
Swords	12	4	1	7	193	190	3	5	23
CYM	13	3	1	9	184	305	−121	3	17
Gorey	13	2	1	10	118	244	−126	2	12
Wexford Wanderers	12	1	0	11	90	314	−224	3	7
Athboy	11	0	0	11	27	491	−464	0	0
Correct as of 21 November 2007

== Past winners ==
- 1994/1995 CYM
- 1995/1996 Railway Union
- 1996/1997 Malahide
- 1997/1998 Wicklow
- 1998/1999 Aer Lingus
- 1999/2000 Portarlington
- 2000/2001 Seapoint
- 2001/2002 New Ross
- 2002/2003 Cill Dara
- 2003/2004 Rathdrum
- 2004/2005 Newbridge
- 2005/2006 North Kildare
- 2006/2007 Tullow
- 2007/2008 Rathdrum
