= Leinster League Division Two =

- Sport: Rugby union
- Instituted: 1994
- Number of teams: 14
- Nation: Ireland
- Holders: Newbridge RFC (2007–08)
- Related competitions: Leinster League Division One; Leinster League Division Three

Leinster League Division Two is the second division of rugby union in the Leinster League. It started in the 1994/95 season.

== History ==
Kilkenny, Seapoint, Curragh, Drogheda, Roscrea, North Kildare, Athy, Gorey, Longford, Edenderry and Tullamore entered the division through the qualifying matches in the 1993/1994 season.

Curragh later amalgamated with Old Kilcullen RFC to form Newbridge and Drogheda with Delvin RFC to form Boyne.

== Teams ==
As of the 2025/2026 season, the teams in the division included:

- Arklow
- Balbriggan
- Cill Dara
- Coolmine
- Edenderry
- Longford
- Newbridge
- New Ross
- North Kildare

== Past winners ==
- 1994/1995 Seapoint
- 1995/1996 Tullamore
- 1996/1997 Barnhall
- 1997/1998 Ashbourne
- 1998/1999 Coolmine RFC
- 1999/2000 Garda
- 2000/2001 Arklow
- 2001/2002 Boyne
- 2002/2003 Seapoint
- 2003/2004 Portarlington
- 2004/2005 Mullingar
- 2005/2006 Dundalk
- 2006/2007 Ashbourne
- 2007/2008 Newbridge
- 2008/2009 Coolmine RFC
