= Kate Farrell McCabe =

Irish rugby union player (born 2001)

- Born: 4 January 2001 (age 25) Dublin, Ireland
- Height: 1.67 m (5 ft 6 in)
- Weight: 57 kg (126 lb)
- School: Ballyoughter National School Gorey Community School
- University: Technological University of Dublin

Rugby union career
Amateur team(s)
Years	Team	Apps	(Points)
- Gorey RFC
Senior career
Years	Team	Apps	(Points)
- Suttonians RFC
National sevens team
Years	Team		Comps
2019-	Ireland		

Kate Farrell McCabe (born 4 January 2001) is an Irish rugby union player. She plays for Suttonians RFC and the Ireland women's national rugby sevens team. She represented Ireland at the 2022 Rugby Sevens World Cup.

== Early and personal life ==
Born in Dublin, Ireland, Farrell McCabe moved to Wexford before her first birthday. Her father was a coach with Gorey RFC. In her youth, she was a show jumping rider, a Gaelic footballer, and a camogie player. She attended Ballyoughter National School, Gorey Community School, and Technological University of Dublin. She has a sister and two brothers.

== Career ==
She won three All-Ireland Rugby Sevens medals with Gorey Community School in Wexford. She plays All Ireland League for Suttonians RFC. She was a try scorer as the side won the Ireland League Women's Division Conference final in February 2022.

She played for the Irish under-18 rugby sevens team in 2019. That year she was called up to the senior Irish sevens side. She made her senior debut against France. She played for the senior Ireland side at the Rugby Sevens World Cup in 2022. She subsequently played for Ireland in Sevens Rugby in January 2024 at the SVNS Series tournament in Perth, Western Australia. The Irish team claimed their first World Series tournament victory at the event.
