= Malahide RFC =

Irish rugby union club based in Malahide, Co.Dublin

Malahide
- Full name: Malahide Rugby Football Club
- Union: (Ireland) IRFU
- Branch: Leinster
- Nickname: The Lions
- Founded: 1922; 104 years ago
- Location: Malahide, Dublin, Ireland
- Ground: Estuary Road
- President: Peter Guerrini
- Director of Rugby: Pat Hayes
- Coach: Conall Boomer
- Captain: Lee Byrne
- League: A.I.L. Div. 2B
- 2024–25: 10th - Relegated
Team kit

Official website
- malahiderfc.ie

Malahide RFC is an Irish rugby union club based in Malahide, Fingal County, playing in Division 2C of the All-Ireland League. The club was founded in 1922 but disbanded in 1944 because of a lack of members during World War II. The club was reformed in 1978 and in 2006 the club moved into its new grounds on Estuary Road. The club colours are black and amber, the same colours as Malahide Cricket Club and Malahide Yacht Club.

== History ==
Malahide RFC was founded in 1922. Its patron was Lord Talbot of Malahide. In those years Malahide RFC fielded two senior teams, playing in Leinster Branch IRFU, League and Cup competitions. Matches were played in Malahide Castle grounds, on the site where Malahide Cricket Club now reside. Many players lived outside the village and travelled from Rush, Skerries and Dublin to play for Malahide RFC At the end of each season an Honour Cap was awarded to the outstanding players for that season. The award took the form of a velvet cap, black in colour and rimmed with gold tassels with the relevant year embroidered on the front of the cap. On 27 September 1944, an Extraordinary General Meeting was held in the pavilion. It was presided over by Dr. H. Micheal and in attendance were eleven members. Shortage of members, local support was waning and World War II was taking its toll on membership. The decision was taken to disband the club.

Many of the people associated with the early club still had connections with Malahide. So it was that some of these men held a re-union in the Grove Hotel, Malahide, Some younger people also attended. As a result of a meeting, Malahide RFC was reformed in 1978. Two pitches were rented in Malahide Castle grounds, now under the control of Fingal County Council as Lord Talbot had bequeathed the Castle and demesne to the Irish Government. In 1989 the club purchased their own land on the Back Road, opposite Malahide Castle. In March 1992 the clubhouse and pitch were officially opened.

The mid-1990s were a very successful period in the club's history. In 1996 Malahide won the Leinster League Division Four and were promoted into Division Three which they won the next season. Malahide stayed in Division Two for two seasons but were relegated in 2000.

On 16 September 2006 the club's new grounds at Estuary Road were officially opened. The opening was marked by former Malahide resident and Irish rugby legend Ollie Campbell and with a one-off blitz tournament between Malahide and Clontarf, Suttonians, Skerries, Coolmine, Swords, Balbriggan and Old Belvedere. In 2009 the club unveiled the new players strip. The kit retained old traditional black & gold colours but with a new modern variation.

In 2010 the club appointed Rick Evans as the first team head coach. The club won the league by winning all their games bar one, ending the season with a 57–3 win over Railway Union away. The first team were promoted to Leinster Division 2 for the 2011/12 season.

== Facilities ==
The 13,500-square-foot (1,250 m^{2}) clubhouse has state of the art facilities including two rugby pitches (one floodlit), one all weather training area and use of the adjacent Seabury pitch plus, four changing rooms, a referees changing room, a high quality weights room and a physio room. The clubhouse also has a Rugby Bar and a function room suitable for seating over 120 people, kitchen facilities and a conference room capable of holding up to 200 people.

== Teams ==
=== Senior teams ===
Malahide RFC field three Senior teams.

=== Youth and Mini Rugby ===
At youth level, teams are fielded at Under 13, 14, 15, 17 and 19 in Dublin Metropolitan Leagues and mini level teams are fielded at, Under 6, 7, 8, 9, 10 and 12, also competing in Dublin Metropolitan competitions. Many players have gone on to represent the Leinster Metro team.

The club also has an association with Malahide Community School: the school teams play their home matches at the club and many pupils have gone on to represent the club at senior level and youth levels.

== Honours ==
- Leinster League Division 3 (2): 1996/97, 2010/11
- Leinster League Division 4 (1): 1995/96
- Leinster J4 League Section C (1): 2009/10
- Leinster Metro League Division 9 (1): 2013/2014
