= Tullow RFC =

Rugby union club in County Carlow, Ireland

(Ireland) Tullow RFC
- Full name: Tullow Rugby Club
- Union: IRFU; Leinster
- Nickname: Tullow
- Founded: 1928; 98 years ago
- Ground(s): Blackgates, Tullow
Team kit

Tullow RFC is an Irish rugby union club in Tullow, County Carlow. It plays in Division 1A of the Leinster League as at the 2024–25 season.

== History ==
The club was founded in 1928, but closed after around 30 years. It was re-established in 1971. The first president in the club was Larry Kenny. Some of the same families involved in 1928 are still actively involved.

== Facilities ==
The club house, which extends to 4,500 sq. ft. includes bar facilities, a large ballroom, kitchen facilities, 4 large changing rooms with showers, physiotherapy room, weights gym, 2 full sized playing fields and training areas. The pitches and training area have state of the art floodlights as well as two dugouts and a supporters stand on the main field.

== Notable players ==
Ireland and Leinster hooker Bernard Jackman started his senior career with the club and later coached the team as well, before moving on to Division Two outfit Coolmine

== Honours ==
- Leinster Towns Cup: 2016-17, 2022-23
