= Bernard Jackman =

Irish rugby union player

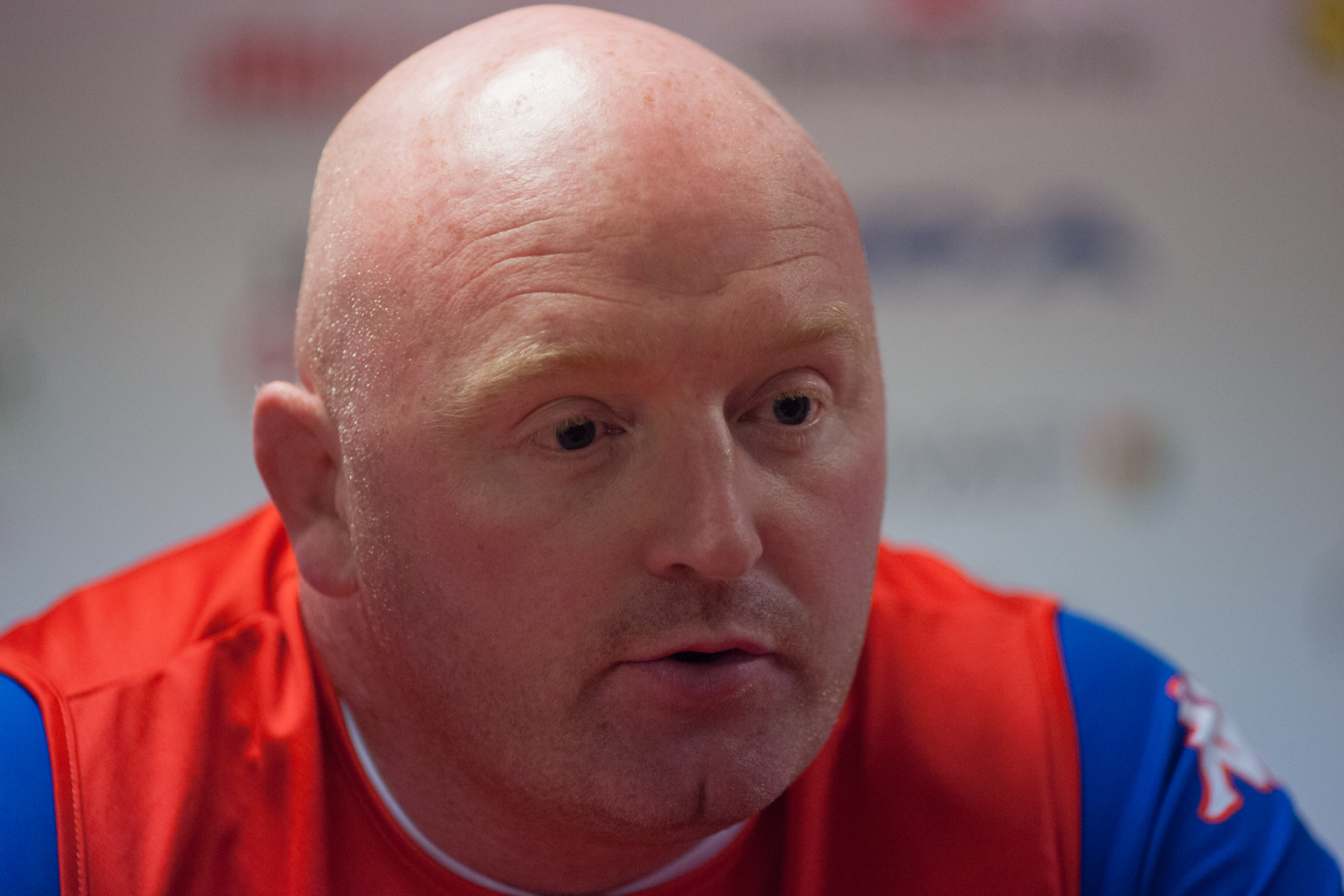
- Jackman in 2014
- Born: Bernard Jackman; 5 May 1976 (age 50) Tullow, County Carlow, Ireland
- Height: 1.83 m (6 ft 0 in)
- Weight: 115 kg (18 st 2 lb; 254 lb)
- School: Newbridge College
- University: Dublin City University

Rugby union career
- Position: Hooker
Senior career
Years	Team	Apps	(Points)
- Tullow RFC
- Newbridge (Ireland)
- County Carlow FC
- Lansdowne
- Clontarf FC
1999–2001	Sale Sharks	23	
2001–2002	Clontarf FC		
Provincial / State sides
Years	Team	Apps	(Points)
1997–1999	Connacht	18	(5)
2002–2005	Connacht	52	(20)
2005–2010	Leinster	91	(20)
- Correct as of 5 December 2014
International career
Years	Team	Apps	(Points)
	Ireland A	4	
2000–2008	Ireland	9	
- Correct as of 5 December 2014
Coaching career
- Years: Team
- 2011–2016: FC Grenoble (Forwards Coach)
- 2016–2017: FC Grenoble (Head Coach)
- 2017–2018: Dragons (Head Coach)
- 2019-2024: Bective Rangers FC (Head Coach)

Bernard Jackman (born 5 May 1976) is an Irish former rugby union player who played for Connacht, Leinster and Sale Sharks. At international level, he has also played for Ireland. He released his autobiography, Blue Blood in 2011. He coached at FC Grenoble from 2011 to 2017, becoming head coach in 2016. He was head coach of Welsh Pro14 side the Dragons from 2017 to 2018 and was head coach of Bective Rangers FC from 2019 to 2024.

Since 2018 he has contributed regularly as a rugby analyst and co-commentator for RTÉ Sport, eir Sport, Premier Sports and other media outlets. In 2023 he was appointed Acting Head of High Performance Sport at Horse Sport Ireland in preparation for the 2024 Olympic Games.

== Early life ==
Born 5 May 1976, Tullow, County Carlow, Ireland, Jackman was educated at College and Dublin City University where he studied a degree in business studies and Japanese.

== Playing career ==
=== Club rugby ===
Jackman was persuaded by Warren Gatland to turn professional and subsequently had two spells playing for Connacht. In between he also played for Sale Sharks, helping them win the 2001–02 European Challenge Cup.

In 2005, Jackman signed for Leinster. A broken leg hindered his early Leinster career but he eventually established himself as a first team regular. He was a prominent member of the team that won the 2007–08 Celtic League title and he also earned himself a recall into the senior Ireland squad. He retired from the professional game after a concussion injury in 2010. Bernard Jackman has become an acting ambassador for Acquired Brain Injury Ireland, standing strongly behind the concussion awareness campaign 'Mind your Head in Sport'. John Fogarty another Leinster Hooker had to retire with a similar concussion injury soon after.

=== Ireland international ===
Jackman represented Ireland at U19, U21 and college levels and captained Ireland A before graduating to the senior Ireland team. He was included in the squad for the 1998 tour of South Africa but was not capped. He was capped twice during the 2005 tour of Japan and won two further caps during the 2007 tour of Argentina. He was also included in Ireland's 2008 Six Nations Championship squad and featured in all five games.

== Coaching career ==
Jackman has coached several junior Leinster teams, including Tullow RFC, Newbridge RFC and Coolmine RFC. He has guided Newbridge to victory in both a league title and the Lalor Cup. In May 2009, he was appointed Director of Rugby and forwards coach of Clontarf FC.

In 2011 he was appointed on a consultancy basis as skills and forwards coach with FC Grenoble and made full-time for the 2012/2013 season. In June 2016, following the departure of Fabrice Landreau, he became Head Coach of FC Grenoble. In March 2017, with the club bottom of the Top14 Jackman left Grenoble. Grenoble were subsequently relegated at the end of the 2016–17 season.

For 2017–18, he became head coach at the Dragons in Wales. Jackman parted company with the Dragons in December 2018 after 18 months in charge.

In May 2019, Jackman was announced as the new head of coaching of Bective Rangers FC, a Dublin-based club and one of Ireland's oldest existing rugby clubs. On his appointment to Bective Rangers, Jackman said "I always found Bective to be a club with great people and having helped out the squad at the end of [last] season I think they have the potential for future success”. Jackman stepped down from Bective after the 2023/2024 season to focus on his role as Head of Performance with Horse Sport Ireland.

== Honours ==
Sale Sharks

- European Challenge Cup
  - Winners: 2001–02: 1

Leinster

- Celtic League
  - Winners: 2007–08: 1
  - Runners up: 2005–06: 1
- Heineken Cup
  - Winners: 2008–09: 1

== Books ==
- Blue Blood – The Bernard Jackman Autobiography, ISBN 0-9563598-2-5
