= Nick Popplewell =

Irish rugby union player

- Born: Nicholas Popplewell; 6 April 1964 (age 62) Dublin, Ireland
- Height: 1.78 m (5 ft 10 in)
- Weight: 115 kg (18 st 2 lb; 254 lb)
- School: Newtown School

Rugby union career
- Position: Prop
Amateur team(s)
Years	Team	Apps	(Points)
1982–1984	Gorey RFC		
1984–1997	Greystones RFC		
Senior career
Years	Team	Apps	(Points)
1996–1999	Newcastle Falcons		
Provincial / State sides
Years	Team	Apps	(Points)
1987–1997	Leinster		
International career
Years	Team	Apps	(Points)
1989–1998	Ireland	48	(13)
1993	British and Irish Lions	3	(0)

Nicholas Popplewell (born 6 April 1964) is an Irish former rugby union player who won 48 caps for his country between 1989 and 1998. He played club rugby for Gorey RFC, Greystones RFC, Wasps RFC, Newcastle Falcons, and also captained Leinster Rugby for a season. At Newcastle he made 19 appearances as they won the 1997-98 Premiership. He started all three tests for the British & Irish Lions on the tour to New Zealand in 1993, and was seen as one of the stars of the tour.

After retiring from rugby, he became an estate agent, and gained a master's degree in business studies.
