= Lucy Mulhall =

Ireland international rugby union player

- Full name: Lucy Mulhall Rock
- Born: 29 September 1993 (age 33) Wicklow, Leinster, Ireland
- Height: 156 cm (5 ft 1 in) (Note: According to the IRFU, Mulhall's height is recorded at 156 cm.; World Rugby has Mulhall's height at 163 cm tall.)
- Weight: 61 kg (134 lb)
- University: Trinity College Dublin

Rugby union career
Senior career
Years	Team	Apps	(Points)
- Rathdrum
National sevens team
Years	Team		Comps
2015–2024	Ireland		

Lucy Mulhall Rock (born 29 September 1993) is a retired Irish rugby sevens player and the former captain of the Women's Irish rugby sevens team.

== Rugby career ==
Mulhall debuted for the Ireland women's sevens team in 2015, and plays club rugby for Rathdrum.

As of 23 January 2022, Mulhall has scored over 440 points for Ireland in the World Rugby Women's Sevens Series.

Mulhall was studying science student at Trinity College Dublin and played Gaelic football for Wicklow prior to becoming a rugby sevens player.

She led Ireland at the 2024 Summer Olympics in Paris.
