= Aidan Kearney (rugby union) =

Irish rugby player (born 1979)

- Born: 24 May 1979 (age 47) Dublin, Ireland
- Height: 2.01 m (6 ft 7 in)
- Weight: 115 kg (18 st 2 lb)
- School: St Paul's College; St Michael's College

Rugby union career
- Position(s): Second row, back row
Amateur team(s)
Years	Team	Apps	(Points)
1998-2000	UCD		
2000-2003	Dungannon		
2003-2005	Clontarf		
2005-2013	Suttonians		
Senior career
Years	Team	Apps	(Points)
2000–2002	Ulster	0	(0)
2002-2004	Leinster	25	(30)
International career
Years	Team	Apps	(Points)
1997-1998	Ireland U19	6	
1998-1999	Irish Universities	3	
1998-2000	Ireland U21	7	
2001-2002	Development Side	2	
National sevens team
Years	Team		Comps
2001	Ireland 7s		4

Aidan Kearney (born 24 May 1979) is a retired Irish rugby union player. He played as a second row and occasionally in the back row representing Leinster and Ulster professionally between 2000 and 2004. Notable for his athleticism, Kearney also played for the Ireland sevens side at the 2001 Rugby World Cup Sevens and was a member of the Ireland side which won the FIRA U19 World Championships in France in 1998 alongside Brian O'Driscoll.

After retirement Kearney took up coaching and has had roles with Suttonians RFC, Dublin City University, Trinity College, Dublin and CYM RFC as well as working as a rugby operations officer with the IRFU.
