= Hugh Dolan (rugby union) =

Irish rugby union player (1921–2011)

- Died: February 2011 (aged 90)
- School: Blackrock College
- University: University College Dublin
- Occupation: Doctor

Rugby union career
- Position: Prop/Lock
International career
Years	Team	Apps	(Points)
1946	Ireland		

Hugh Dolan (1921 – 2011) was an Irish physician and international rugby union player.

Dolan was a native of Carrick-on-Shannon. The son of a veterinary surgeon, Dolan was one of seven siblings and attended Blackrock College, before undertaking medical studies at University College Dublin.

A forward, Dolan played rugby with the University College Dublin first XV and represented Leinster in provincial matches from 1942 to 1948. He appeared for an Ireland XV in the 1946 Victory Internationals, for which he was retrospectively awarded an international cap in 2023.

Dolan later practiced medicine in Roscrea, County Tipperary, serving during this time as president of Roscrea RFC. He was Chief Medical Officer for County Louth from 1969 to 1988, then in 1991 was appointed chairman of the North Eastern Health Board. He retired in 2002.

== See also ==
- List of Ireland national rugby union players
