= Birr RFC =

Irish rugby union club based in Birr, Co.Offaly

(Ireland) Birr
- Full name: Birr Rugby Football Club
- Union: IRFU; Leinster
- Nickname: The Birr Grizzly Bears
- Founded: 1887; 139 years ago
- Ground(s): Riverside, Birr (Capacity: varies)
Team kit

Official website
- www.birrrugby.ie

Birr RFC is an Irish rugby union team based in Birr, County Offaly, playing in Division 2B of the Leinster League. Formed in 1887 the club is one of the oldest clubs the country. The club colours are green and black.

== History ==
=== Early years ===
Birr RFC was first founded in 1887, the local newspaper reports on a rugby match in Chesterfield School (on the Banagher Road) between a Birr XV and a team from Galway Grammar School.

The club grew, disbanded and reformed in its early years, mainly as a result of both world wars.

The club purchased our Moorpark Grounds, consisting of 4.5 acres in the centre of Birr Town in 1963 after reforming and proceeded to win the Midland League in 1963-64 and has been in continuous existence since then.

=== 1970s-1980s ===
During the 1970s, an underage rugby culture evolved in Birr RFRC. The club also purchased a further 7.5 acres of land in 1975 approx 4 km south of Birr off the N52 road in Ballyeigan. Leinster Provincial honors followed at Under 15 level in 1976-77 and at Under 17 level in 1977-78.

For many years, Dooley's Hotel provided facilities for Birr RFC. In the early 1970s the County Arms Hotel provided facilities until 1983 after a merger with the Ormond Lawn Tennis Club. A new clubhouse with meeting, changing and entertaining facilities was built, at a cost of over £150,000 with local fundraising, bank loans and the assistance of a Department of Education Sports Capital Grant and a Department of Labour Youth Employment Grant. Following the demise of The Ormond Lawn Tennis Club the club reverted to the Birr Rugby Club.

=== 1990s ===
In 1996/97, Birr 1st XV team gained promotion from Division 4. Birr 2nd XV won their section also in Division 4.

In 1997/98, Birr maintained Division 3 status, narrowly failing to gain promotion to Division 2. Having secured a bye in the first round of the Smithwicks Provincial Towns Cup, Birr defeated New Ross, and Mullingar to be beaten in the semi-final by Naas, the eventual winners of the Cup.

In 1998/99, Birr reached the semi-finals of the Provincial Town's Cup for the second time in its history. Again, the club was beaten, this time by Naas to a scoreline of 15-3. Birr's youths section embarked on their very first international tour when 39 players and eleven accompanying coaches/adults were hosted by Ellon RFC, near Aberdeen, in Scotland. The travelling party won the locally arranged tournament at both under 10's and under 12's.

Losing many of its players to retirement, the 1999/2000 season was disappointing for the club as it was demoted to Division 4 of the Leinster League. The disappointment of the season was lifted when the club embarked on a tour to Argentina. The youth section hosted Ellon RFC at mini level. Ellon RFC won the specially commissioned CARA Cup and both club twinned at Youth level.

=== 21st century ===
In 2000, following negotiations with the then Birr Town Council, and including an exchange of freehold and leasehold properties, Birr RFC acquired a long term lease on Council lands at Riverside. This site contains 2 full-size rugby pitches in the centre of Birr town.

In the 2000/2001 season, the club gained promotion by winning Division 4. Due to the Foot & Mouth epidemic in both the UK and Ireland, travel restrictions forced the cancellation of many tours including the return tour to Scotland by the mini section.

=== 2010-2020s ===
Birr 1st XV won the Provincial Towns (J2) Plate in the 2011-12 & 2018-19 seasons.

The 2015-16 season saw the 1st introduction of Women's Rugby in Birr at Under 15 and Under 18 level.

Several club players, at underage level, represented Ireland at youth level from U18, U19 and U20s.

== Notable players ==
- Peter Dooley
- Shane Delahunt
- Michael Milne
- Jack Regan

== Honours ==
- Provincial Towns (J2) Plate: 2011-12; 2018-19
- Midland League: 1963-64
