= Portarlington RFC =

Irish rugby union club based in Portarlington, Co. Laois

(Ireland) Portarlington / PortDara Falcons
- Full name: Portarlington Rugby Football Club
- Union: IRFU; Leinster
- Nickname: Port
- Founded: 1974; 52 years ago
- Ground(s): Lea Road, Portarlington, County Laois
Team kit

Portarlington RFC is an Irish rugby union club based in Portarlington, County Laois, their men's senior team are playing in Division 2B of the Leinster League. Their ladies' team is an amalgamation with Cill Dara RFC and is called PortDara Falcons and are playing in Division 3 of the Ladies Leinster League.

The club colours are maroon and white.
