= Peter Dooley =

Irish rugby union player

- Born: 4 August 1994 (age 32) Birr, County Offaly, Ireland
- Height: 1.83 m (6 ft 0 in)
- Weight: 117 kg (18.4 st; 258 lb)
- School: St. Brendan's Community School

Rugby union career
- Position: Prop
Amateur team(s)
Years	Team	Apps	(Points)
–2012	Birr		
2013–	Lansdowne		
Senior career
Years	Team	Apps	(Points)
2014–2022	Leinster	104	(25)
2022–2026	Connacht	60	(5)
2026–	Leinster	0	(0)
- Correct as of 20 March 2026
International career
Years	Team	Apps	(Points)
2013–2014	Ireland U20	18	(0)
- Correct as of 20 June 2014

Peter Dooley (born 4 August 1994) is an Irish rugby union player for Leinster. His preferred position is loosehead prop. In 2016 he was awarded a senior contract with Leinster following completion of his time in the academy, having previously played with the Leinster senior team, making his debut in October 2014 against Edinburgh He was voted the Leinster Young Player of the year in 2015.

== Rugby career ==
=== Early career ===
Dooley started his rugby playing underage at Birr RFC in County Offaly. Playing number 8 in his teenage years, Dooley was part of the Leinster under-age set up. After entering the Leinster academy he was advised to switch to change position to Loosehead Prop.

=== Ireland ===
Dooley has represented Ireland at under-age level. In June 2021 he was called up to the senior Ireland squad for the Summer tests.
