= Garda RFC =

Irish rugby union club based around Westmanstown, Co. Dublin

(Ireland) Garda RFC
- Full name: Garda Rugby Football Club
- Union: IRFU; Leinster
- Founded: 1965; 61 years ago
- Ground(s): Westmanstown Sports Centre, Dublin
- Chairman: Willie Cooper
- President: Eamon O'Grady
- Captain: Brendan D`Arcy
Team kit

Garda RFC is the rugby union team with players drawn mostly from local areas of Westmanstown (Lucan, Leixlip, Dunboyne, Clonsilla, Castleknock, Blanchardstown) and members of Garda Síochána, the national police force of Ireland. It currently plays in Division 2B of the Leinster League.

== History ==
The club was founded in February 1965 by rugby union enthusiasts at the Garda Station in Pearse Street.

One of its first coaches was the former Ireland and British and Irish Lions prop, Gordon Wood, who was also the father of the rugby icon Keith Wood. His memory is honoured by the Gordon Wood Trophy, competed for annually by the Garda and the Irish Defence Forces rugby teams.

Other trophies contested by the club include the Eugene Crowley Cup against Monkstown, the Doyle Cup against Greystones, the Trevaskis Cup against Clontarf and the George Treiner Cup against Terenure.

== Honours ==
- O'Connell Cup: 1968
- Spencer Cup: 1986, 1989, 1990, 1991, 1992, 1993, 1997, 2002, 2005
- Keating Cup: 1989
- Bill Marshal Trophy: 1989
- Leinster J2 League: 1997
- Leinster League Division Two: 2000
- Leinster League Division 1B Champions: 2011
