= Mainham Cemetery =

- Interactive map of Mainham Cemetery

Details
- Established: Ancient, 6th century or earlier
- Location: Mainham, Clane, County Kildare
- Country: Ireland
- Coordinates: 53°18′57″N 6°41′50″W
- Type: Non-denominational
- Style: Lawn cemetery
- Owned by: Kildare County Council
- Size: 1.8 hectares (4.4 acres)
- No. of graves: Thousands
- Find a Grave: Mainham Cemetery

Mainham Cemetery (Irish: Reilig Mhaighneán) is a cemetery located in Clane, County Kildare, Ireland. The complex contains a medieval fortified church, the tomb of the Wogan Browne family, and a large modern graveyard with outdoor altar.

== History ==
The Clane area and its ford were often the site of conflict between the High Kings of Ireland (based at Tara) and the Kings of Leinster (based at Naas). According to Irish legend, a duel took place near to the bullaun stone between Mesgegra, King of Leinster, and Conall Cernach, champion of Ulaid (Ulster). Mesgegra only had one hand, so Conall fought with one arm tied to his side. Conall was the victor, beheading Mesgegra; his head was buried at Mainham, and his body at King Mesgegra's Mound near the River Liffey. His wife Búan was so shocked by the sight of his severed head that she also died, and is said to be buried under the mound at Mainham. This story is recounted in Tallaind Etair ("The Siege of Howth") in the 12th-century Book of Leinster.

The placename is derived from Maighend, Abbot of Kilmainham in the 6th century AD.

A medieval fortified church was built by the Knights Hospitaller around the 13th century. It was ruined by the 17th century.

The mausoleum of the Wogan Browne family of landlords is at the southern edge, built in 1743. There was a dispute between Catholic landowner Stephen Fitzwilliam Browne and the local Church of Ireland rector; the rector, Mr Daniells, wanted five guineas to build inside the cemetery.

It is currently operated by Kildare County Council. They plan to add a columbarium for cremated remains.

== Buildings ==
=== Graveyard ===
In three sections, with the area that surrounding the ancient church and is enclosed by a circular wall.

=== Church ===
Measuring 65 ft × 18 ft (19.8 m × 5.5 m), it has a tower on its southeastern corner with arrowslits and a spiral staircase. Its fortified nature reflects its location on the edge of The Pale.

=== Motte ===
The motte is believed to be a relict of the first Anglo-Norman motte and bailey, built by John de Hereford in the 13th century. Legend (detailed above) links it with King Mesgegra and Queen Búan.

=== Mausoleum ===
A rectangular church-like structure. Inside is a stone altar with the figures of Browne and his wife Judith Wogan, kneeling either side of the crucified Christ, with the wall embellished in stucco with fluted pilasters and a frieze of seraphim. An earlier tomb of Thomas Browne (d. 1693) was also placed in the mausoleum.

== Notable burials ==
- One gravestone, that of Peter Mackey (d. 1872), bears an inscription "This cross is carved from the original tomb of Wolfe Tone;" Wolfe Tone died in 1798 and was buried in Bodenstown, and his newer tomb was completed in 1873.
- A memorial to Blessed Fr John Sullivan SJ stands in the cemetery.
- Johnny Grealy (1894–1981), member of the Old IRA and Anti-Treaty IRA; later involved with Clan na Gael in the United States
- It is a religiously mixed cemetery, even containing some Greek Orthodox burials.
