= Tullow Agricultural Show =

Annual event in County Carlow, Ireland

- Frequency: Annually, each August
- Locations: Tullow, Co Carlow, Ireland
- Established: 1946

The Tullow Agricultural Show, also known as the County Carlow Show, is a county show that takes place outside the town of Tullow in County Carlow, Ireland each year, typically in mid-August. It is one of a large number of agricultural shows that takes place annually across the country that celebrate rural communities and provide an understanding of Irish rural life.

The show was founded in 1946 for local farmers and businesses to promote their products, and was also a social occasion for the community. It regularly attracts 15,000 visitors each year,

The show was cancelled during the COVID-19 pandemic. In 2025, to mark its 75th edition, the Tánaiste (Ireland's Deputy Prime-Minister), Simon Harris, officially opened the show.
