= Clane (barony) =

Clane Claonadh (Irish)
- Barony
- Interactive map of Clane
- Sovereign state: Ireland
- County: Kildare

Area
  - Total: 129.59 km^{2} (50.03 sq mi)

Clane (Irish: Claonadh) is a barony in County Kildare, Ireland.

== Etymology ==
Clane derives its name from the town of Clane (Irish Claonadh, "slope"/"incline").

== Location ==
Clane barony is found in northern County Kildare, west of the River Liffey and incorporating much of the Bog of Allen.

== History ==
Clane barony was part of the ancient lands of the Uí Broin before the 13th century.

== List of settlements ==
Below is a list of settlements in Clane barony:

- Caragh
- Clane
- Coill Dubh
- Prosperous
- Staplestown
