= Tullow Museum =

- Músaem na Tulaí
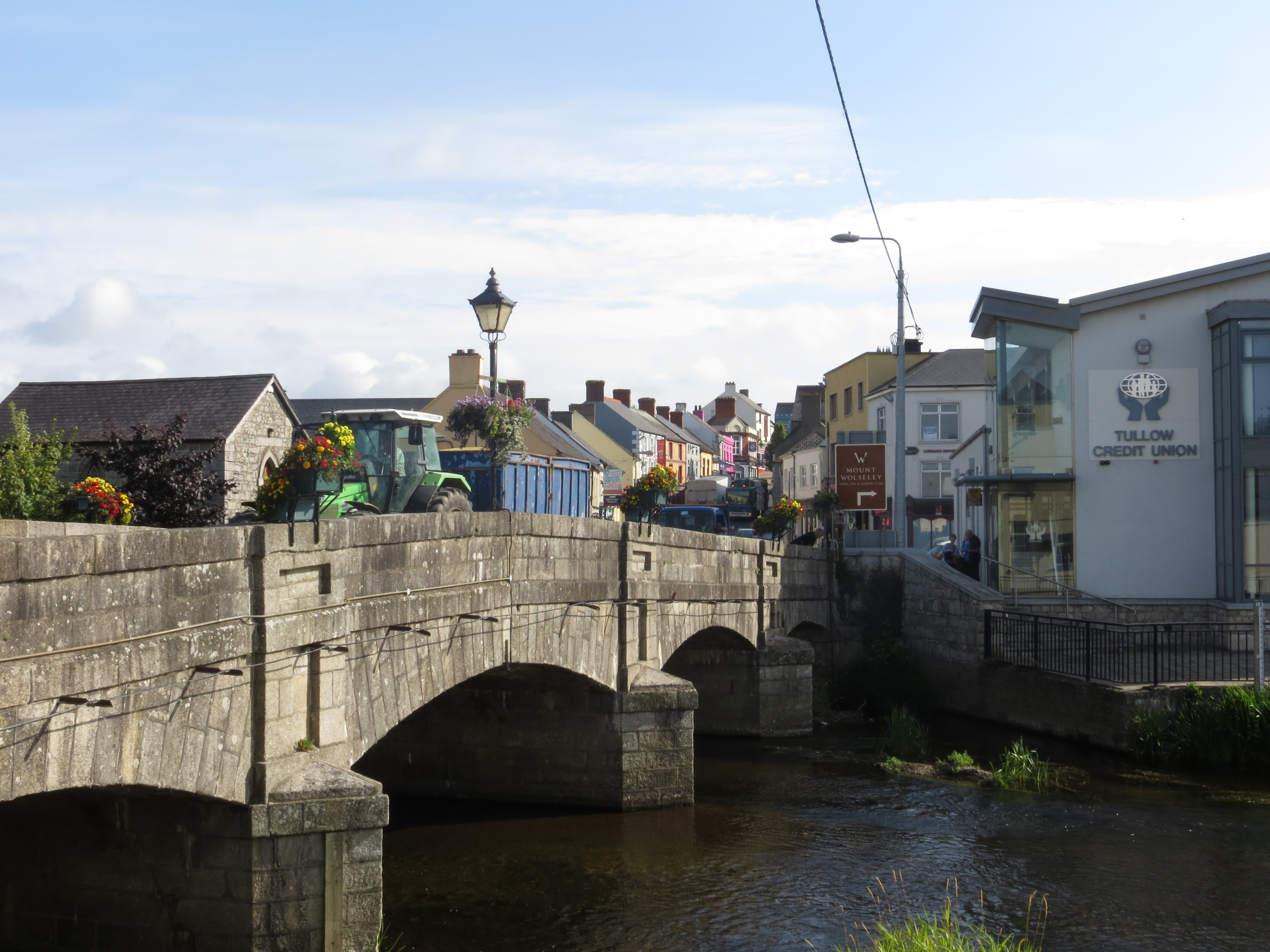
- Tullow Bridge; Tullow Museum is visible at left

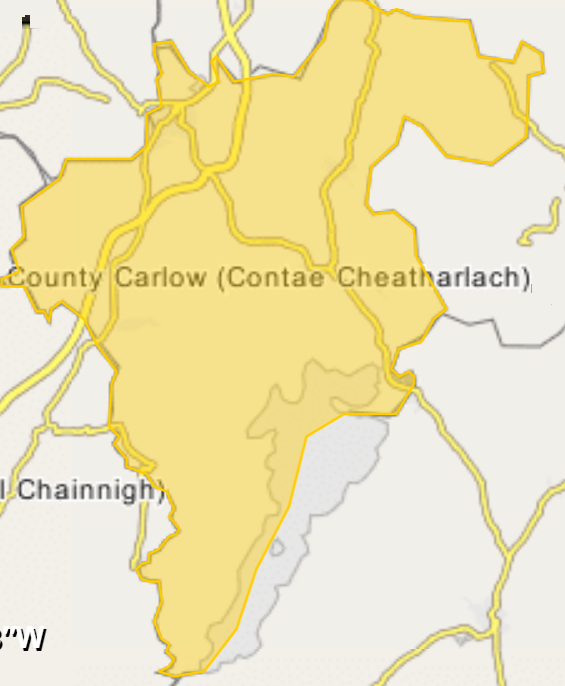
- Location within County Carlow Location within Ireland
- Location: Bridge Street, Tullow, County Carlow, Ireland
- Coordinates: 52.8023°N 6.7379°W
- Type: Local museum
- Website: tullowmuseum.com

Tullow Museum (Irish: Músaem na Tulaí) is a local museum in Tullow, County Carlow in Ireland. It documents the history of Tullow town and the surrounding area.

== History ==
Tullow Museum is located in the former Tullow Methodist church on Bridge Street at the River Slaney Bridge in Tullow. It is run on a voluntary basis by the Tullowphelim Historical Society. The church dates from around 1850.

The museum contains a collection of objects relating to the town's history. There is a focus on Father John Murphy and the events of the 1798 Rebellion, with a display of what are purported to be his last vestments. The museum also has a collection of local historical photographs, and genealogical information on local gravestones. Other items relate to Sir Ernest Shackelton.
