= Swords RFC =

Irish rugby union club based in Swords, Co. Dublin

(Ireland) Swords
- Full name: Swords Rugby Football Club
- Union: IRFU; Leinster
- Founded: 1948; 78 years ago (as Aer Lingus)
- Ground(s): ALSAA Sports Complex, Swords
Team kit

Swords RFC are an Irish rugby team based in Swords, County Dublin, Fingal County, men's team playing in Division 7 of the Metro League and women's team playing the 2026/27 in Division 4 of the Leinster League. The club colours are green and navy.

== History ==
The club started out as Aer Lingus, and disbanded some time later on as a result of failing attendances, but was resurrected in the early 1960s.

1993 saw the club's first major triumph, in the then Leinster Junior 3A League, beating Terenure College, after putting St Mary's College to the sword in the semi-final. In the 2000/2001 season they played in the First Division of the Leinster League before being relegated at the end on account of points difference.

They changed their name to ALSAA (Aer Lingus Social and Athletic Association) in the 2002/2003 season, and then changed to their present name in July 2005.

== Honours ==
- Leinster League Division Three: 1998/1999 (as Aer Lingus)
