= Clondalkin RFC =

Irish rugby union club in Dublin, Ireland

Clondalkin Rugby Club
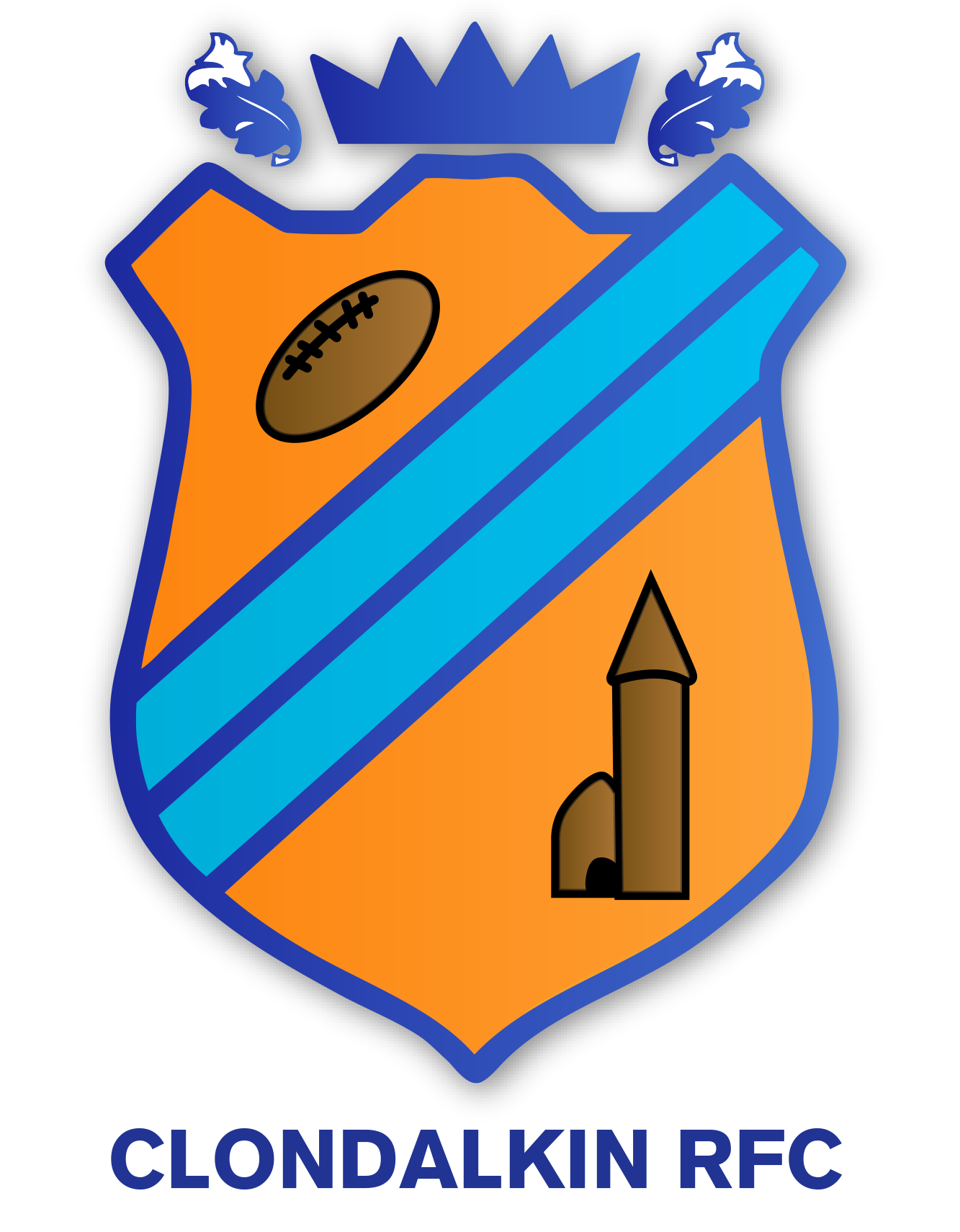
- Full name: Clondalkin Rugby Football Club
- Union: IRFU; Leinster
- Nickname: 'Clon'
- Founded: 1973; 53 years ago
- Ground(s): Baldonnel, Clondalkin, D22Y9H9
- President: Gael Stowe
Team kit

Official website
- www.clondalkinrugby.com

Clondalkin Rugby Football Club (Irish: Cumann Rugbaí Chluain Dolcáin) is a rugby union club based in Clondalkin, Dublin, Ireland. The club, which is known as 'Clon' or 'CRFC', has its grounds at Baldonnel, Clondalkin, Dublin 22. The club plays in the Leinster League and was previously located at Kingswood Cross from 1973 to 2022. The club colours are yellow and blue and these colours feature on the club's crest which also includes a round tower, in reference to Clondalkin's Round Tower.

== History ==
Clondalkin RFC was founded in 1973. The club's first game was against Old Kilcullen RFC and the outing confirmed that the potential existed for a rugby club in Clondalkin, so the club was formed and affiliated to the Leinster Branch. For the first five years, the club was based at Moyle Park College, one of the largest secondary schools in Clondalkin and the club adopted the school's colours as an acknowledgement of the support it received from the school in its formative years.

Gradually, the club began to expand, the number of teams in the club grew and a junior section was established. Described in 2011 as "Leinster rugby's fastest growing club", to cater for its expansion the club purchased grounds at Kingswood Cross. Instrumental in the move was a local bank manager and club member, Paddy Gordon, after whom the grounds were named.

The club sold the grounds at Gordon Park in 2021 and, after purchasing a site at Kingwood Farm in Baldonnel, moved to new larger grounds during 2022.

== Teams ==
The club has senior men's teams, senior women's teams and a youth and mini section featuring players from the ages of 5 up to 18 - boys and girls. The senior men's first team compete in Leinster League (J1) Division 2A, while the senior women's team compete in Division 2. A number of current and former senior players now help to coach the youth and mini teams. Current Leinster player and Ireland international, James Lowe is a regular visitor to the club.
