= Suttonians RFC =

Rugby union football club in Dublin, Ireland

Suttonians Rugby Football Club
- Union: IRFU; Leinster Branch
- Emblem(s): Crest features three castles representing Dublin roots, the coat of arms of the St. Lawrence family and the harp of Leinster "Fág an Bealaċ" (Clear the way)
- Founded: 1899 (re-formed 1924)
- Location: Sutton, Dublin, Ireland
- Ground(s): JJ McDowell Memorial Grounds, Station Road, Sutton, D13 C3K8
- League: Leinster League Division 1A
Team kit

Official website
- www.suttoniansrfc.ie

Suttonians Rugby Football Club is affiliated to the Irish Rugby Football Union. The men's 1st XV team plays in Division 1A of the Leinster League. The women's 1st XV, nicknamed 'Tribe', play in Division 1 of the women's All Ireland League. The clubhouse and grounds are based at the JJ McDowell Memorial Grounds on Station Road, Sutton, Fingal. The club fields five senior sides with underage teams from under 6 age grade up to under 20, men's and women's.

Suttonians is one of only four Northside Dublin clubs to have played in the All Ireland Leagues (Clontarf, Skerries and Malahide being the others).

== History ==
=== Beginning ===
In Sutton, in September 1899, the club was founded as Sutton Rugby Football Club. It was largely made up of members of the Royal Irish Constabulary and the Coast Guard. The Great War was responsible for the disbandment of the club and the scattering of its members. The club was re-formed in 1924 as Suttonians Rugby Football Club.

The club's original 'tin shed' clubhouse, which was located at the main Howth Road entrance to the grounds, remained in use until a new clubhouse was built in the present location on Station Road in 1970/71.

=== Reformation ===
With little or no direct association to the old club, a group of young men banded together in the summer of 1924 to reform the club with the new name of Suttonians Rugby Football Club. With a membership of about 18 people, the local politician Senator Andrew Jameson provided financial assistance and assistance in the procurement of playing grounds from Howth Castle, off Saxe Lane, Sutton. Suttonians RFC became affiliated to the Leinster Branch of the Irish Rugby Football Union in 1927 and has since then taken part in branch competitions at all levels.

=== Selection of colours, crest and motto ===
By 1930, the membership had expanded to include over 50 players. The club’s strip, of the time, was a blue shirt with an emblazoned white star. This strip was abandoned in or about 1932/33 and the present colours of "royal blue, white and emerald green" were adopted. These colours were those worn by Jack McDowell's horse 'Caughoo' when it won the English Grand National in 1947.

The club crest and motto (which include the mottoless Dublin and part of the St. Lawrence coats of arms) were adopted by the club at a general meeting held in the Royal Hotel Howth in the 1950s. "Fág an Bealach", which translates from Irish as "clear the way", was chosen as the club motto.

=== Move to Station Road ===
In 1934, the club moved from Saxe Lane to its present location at Station Road, Sutton. The recently excavated sand pit there was made available and significant effort on the part of its members turned it into a playing field. It remains the club’s main pitch to this day although it has been filled in. The first match played on it was against neighbouring Malahide RFC on 24 November 1934.

=== 1930s and 1940s ===
In the 1932/33 season, the club's 1st XV were the beaten finalists in the Minor (nowadays referred to as Junior 2) League.

The 1940s opened quietly, but a team was gradually formed under the guidance of Seamus Henry.

During the 1946/47 season, the team was narrowly beaten in extra time in the Minor League final by UCD's 3rd XV, having overcome such teams as Blackrock College, Terenure College, Old Belvedere, CYMS and Palmerston throughout the campaign. In the Metropolitan Cup competition (competed for annually by Dublin’s Junior 1 teams), Suttonians defeated Monkstown, UCD and Belvedere before defeating Clontarf in a "local derby" cup final. The 'Met Cup' had come to Sutton in fulfilment of a dream conceived by Seamus Henry and realised with the efforts of players like Tom Geary, Brendan McClancy, Walter Scott and Oliver Campbell - whose son Ollie Campbell played international rugby in later years. In the 1946/47 season, the 1st XV played 22 matches, won 20, drew one and lost one, accumulating 191 points while conceding 59.

=== 1950s and 1960s ===
The club won Minor League titles in 1949/50 and again in 1951/52. It was after the second of these victories that the team was promoted to the ranks of Junior Rugby.

During the 1960s, the club went into decline with many players going to Senior Clubs and the loss of the top pitch. In 1964, the club put up the Spencer Memorial Cup (commemorating a former club captain who died as a result of an injury received while playing rugby). An annual competition was initiated, restricted to Metropolitan Clubs of Junior status or below.

=== 1970s ===
In 1971 the new pavilion, situated at a new location on Station Road, was opened by Robert Ganly, then president of the Leinster Branch of the IRFU. The committee hoped this would redress the standing of the club in the area by providing better facilities. Foxfield Youth RFC arrived to train and practise at Sutton about this time. They won the McAuley Cup (U15s) in 1976 and shortly afterwards merged their identity with Suttonians enabling the club to boast a strong juvenile section. This allowed the club to win the Harry Gale Cup (U19s) in 1978, the McAuley Cup in 1979 and the Culliton Cup (u18s) in 1987.

=== 1980s and 1990s ===
In 1981, the club won the Spencer Cup for the first time (The cup was also brought to Sutton in 1988). In 1982, a second pitch adjoining Station Road was purchased. The clubhouse was extensively damaged in a fire at the start of the 1984 season, and was redesigned and rebuilt during the following season.

In the 1993/94 season, the club won the Leinster League, the Spencer Cup and were finalists in the Metropolitan Cup. The club won the Leinster League during the 1995/96 season and was promoted to the then 4th Division of the All Ireland League. In 1997, the club won the 4th Division of the All Ireland League with a 100% record, one of only three teams to have ever achieved this in any division.

=== 2000s ===
For the first time, the club was involved in Division 3 playoffs after a fourth-place finish during the 2004/05 season, losing out to runaway Division 3 winners Greystones. In the 2005/06 season, Suttonians achieved gained promotion to All Ireland League Division 2, progressing to the semi-final of the Leddin Finance Leinster Senior Cup, and competed in the inaugural All Ireland Cup as one of only five sides representing Leinster. The club finished thirteenth in their first season of AIL Division 2, having been placed in joint third at the Christmas break.

=== 2010s ===
In the 2010s, the decade began with Suttonians finishing in ninth position of AIL Division 3. The team won all games bar the final match against newly promoted Midleton.

In this period, the club it was relegated - first from the AIL to the Leinster League Division 1A, then to Division 1B. At the end of the 2016/17 season, the club avoided further relegation by winning a play-off against Carlow RFC and barely securing its place in the division.

The following season saw victory in a Promotion Play-off game against DLSP to gain access to Division 1A again. However, the fortune of other Leinster clubs relegated from the AIL went against Suttonians. The 2018/19 season saw the club's Men's 1st XV win promotion to Leinster League 1A with 11 wins in 14 games and topping the table by seven points.

The decade also saw the emergence and success of women's rugby at the club, with the Ladies 1st XV engaged in the Leinster Division 2 and narrowly missing winning the league in 2018. That same year however, the Ladies 1st XV won the Leinster Rugby Paul Flood Cup, disposing of three Division 1 teams along the way to reach the final. The 2018/19 has seen the Women's 1st XV win promotion to the 2019/20 All Ireland Women's league after winning the Leinster Women's division 2 with 14 wins from 14 matches and a 16 point difference to the second placed club. They won promotion to the AIL leagues with wins over established women's teams in a tough qualification process.

=== 2020s ===
The new decade began well with Suttonians finishing in the top half of the Division 1A table while beating the top two teams in the table in the final four games of the season. This followed two seasons cut short and ultimately suspended by the onset of Covid-19.

== Players ==
Drawing on the local community, Suttonians has been for many years a 'parish' style club attracting members from the immediate surroundings and just beyond. Still featuring a majority of home-grown players, the club has been home to a number of players from further afield, many of whom strong links with the club. Aaron Mauger plied his trade with the club for a season, before he broke into the professional ranks in New Zealand. Similarly, the club introduced Irish international Ian Keatley to the game of rugby.

The club has produced several under-age Interprovincials and Internationals, including one Ladies under-age representative, and the latest being a Leinster Rugby Junior selection. Leinster Rugby academy player Jack Aungier, who is a former Ireland u-20s International, played his rugby from minis up to under-age level. After a period with the Leinster academy, Aungier moved to Connacht and scored a debut try for Connacht against Ulster in the Aviva Stadium in August 2020.

== Academy ==
Founded in the 2002/03 season, the Suttonians Academy was generated with the aim of identifying and working with elite players, who demonstrate development potential, among the under 18 and under 20 age grades. Additional coaching is provided to help those players improve their skills. All players remain fully amateur and work or attend college during their time in the academy. Every summer, two Suttonians Academy players are sent to Durban, South Africa and spend the summer months attending the academy of the Super Rugby franchise The Sharks.

== Teams ==
Senior
1st XV

- Leinster League Division 1A
- Spencer Cup

2nd XV

- Leinster Seconds League Division 1A
- Jim Byrne Cup

3rd XV

- Metro League Division 10

Women's XV

- All Ireland League
- All Ireland Cup

== Notable players ==
=== Current players ===
- (Ireland) Jack Aungier (full international)
- Sean Cribbin (Olympian & Ireland Sevens)
- (Ireland) Ian Keatley (full international)

=== Former players ===
- (Ireland) Aidan Kearney
- (New Zealand) Aaron Mauger (full international)
- (Ireland) Tom Sexton
