= North Meath RFC =

Irish rugby union club, based in Kells, Co. Mayo

(Ireland) North Meath
- Full name: North Meath Rugby Football Club
- Union: IRFU; Leinster
- Founded: 2007; 19 years ago
- Ground(s): The Grange, Kells
- Coach: Simon deevy
- Captain: Nathan Keirnan
Team kit

North Meath RFC is an Irish rugby union team based in Kells, County Meath. They play in the North East McGee Cup & The Anderson Cup. They won The 2nd Towns cup in 2011. The club colours are black and yellow. The club also has a Women's team, founded in November 2016 by John Fitzgerald and Victor Grey. They are currently in a Division 4 Development League playing under Manager John Fitzgerald and Coach Ben Traynor. Their captain in Maye Muldoon.
