= Clane RFC =

Irish rugby union club based in Clane, Co. Kildare

(Republic of Ireland) Clane RFC
- Full name: Clane Rugby Football Club
- Union: IRFU; Leinster
- Founded: 1984; 42 years ago
- Ground: Ballingappa Road
Team kit

Clane RFC is an Irish rugby union team based in Clane, County Kildare, playing in Division 3 of the Leinster League. The club colours are black and red. The club has teams at all underage levels, from U7 to U18. The U18 side reached the final of the Leinster League in May 2016, losing 30–27 via a last minute penalty to Portarlington in Donnybrook.

The club shares its grounds with Clane United FC on the Ballinagappa Road.

== Honours ==
- Hosie Cup: 2000/2001, 2001/2002, 2008/2009
- Leinster League Division 3 2025/2026
