= Clane =

Town in County Kildare, Ireland

Clane Claonadh
- Town
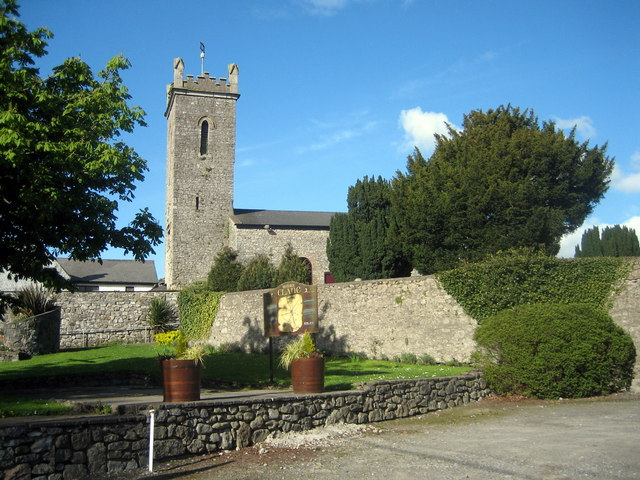
- Clane Abbey

- Location in Ireland
- Coordinates: 53.29185°N 6.68612°W
- Country: Ireland
- Province: Leinster
- County: County Kildare
- Elevation: 70 m (230 ft)

Population (2022)
  - Total: 8,152
- Time zone: UTC±0 (WET)
  - Summer (DST): UTC+1 (IST)
- Eircode: W91
- Telephone area code: 045
- Irish Grid Reference: N872278
- Website: clanecommunity.ie

Clane (/ˈkleɪn/; Irish: Claonadh) is a town in County Kildare, Ireland. With a population of 8,152 in 2022, it is the ninth-largest town in Kildare and the 66th-largest in Ireland. The town is on the River Liffey. Clane gives its name to the associated townland, civil parish, electoral division and surrounding barony.

== Location ==
Clane is 29 km (18 mi) west of Dublin city centre, and is on the crossroads of the R403 and R407 regional roads.

== History ==
The town most probably owes its origin to the foundation of Clane Friary in the sixth century, from about 520 A.D., when Ailbe of Emly, Bishop of Ferns, founded an Abbey in Clane and made St. Senchel the Elder its first Abbot. Saint Ultan Tua, who used to put a stone into his mouth to prevent him from speaking during Lent, and his brother Fotharnaise, are said to have been buried in Clane. They were brothers of Maighend, Abbot of Kilmainham, from whom the parish and church of Mainham, near Clane, were probably called. King Mesgegra's Mound claims links to the legendary first-century AD king Mesgegra of Leinster. It was later used by Normans.

The ruins of the Franciscan monastery founded at Clane by Sir Gerald FitzMaurice, 3rd Lord Ophaly, in 1272 still exist. In 1542, Henry VIII's Commissioner granted the site and precincts of this House of Friars, manor or preaching-house of the preaching Friars of Clane to Robert Eustace, Roger Roche and Ed. Brown for £177. Besides about 70 acres (28 ha) of land in the neighbourhood, its possessions consisted of a church, cemetery, chapter-house, dormitory, store, kitchen, two chambers, stable and orchard. The dormitory and other buildings probably stood on the north side of the Abbey Church, and have long since completely disappeared.

The parish of Clane has the distinction of being the place where the rebellion of 1798 broke out; a battle between the United Irishmen and the Yeomen forces led by Richard Griffith took place on Coiseanna Hill by the modern Woods Centre. The rebels were easily defeated, and the survivors fled to Timahoe with the rest of the North Kildare rebels.

== Features and amenities ==
Clane has two Liffey tributaries: the Butter Stream in the southwest, with a small park, and the Gollymochy River on the eastern side.

Sections of The Pale remain as ditches and hedgerows in private fields to the north of Clane.

Clane Friary and Abbey Cemetery lie to the south of the village. The Abbey, on Main Street, was formerly a church, then a ruin, and has since been restored into a community centre and garden of remembrance. The Wogan Mausoleum and churchyard lies at Mainham.

The Liffeyside Nature Park is a small wilderness area leading to a paved path by the River Liffey.

Clane General Hospital is a private hospital founded in 1985 that offers surgical and outpatient procedures, including a fertility clinic.

== Demographics ==
Clane is a commuter town for Dublin, which lies 29 km (18 mi) to the east.

As of the 2022 census, Clane had a population of 8,152 people, an increase from 7,280 in the 2016 census. According to the 2011 census, 2,565 people then spoke Irish in Clane (with 880 people speaking it daily). 984 people speak a language other than English or Irish, with Polish the most common foreign language (with 336 speakers).

== Transport ==
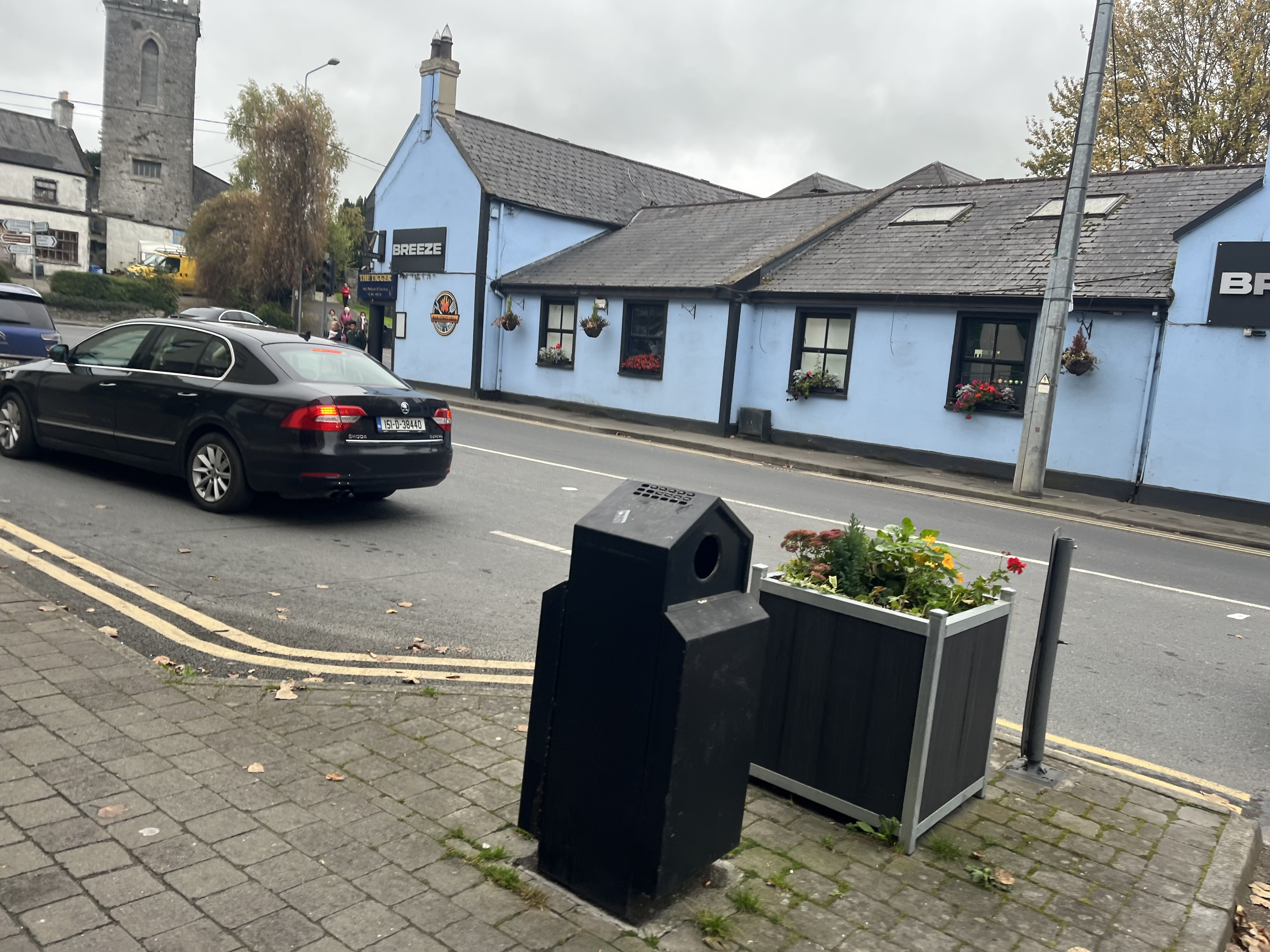
The R407 passes through Clane

A commuter railway station in Sallins, approximately 6 km (4 mi) from Clane, has a service to Dublin. The town is also served by Go-Ahead Ireland, which operates regular bus services between Edenderry and Dublin on routes 120/a/b/c/d/e/f/x. A rapid town link service, provided by private operator JJ Kavanagh and Sons operates hourly between Clane, Sallins and Naas, and the route 139 served by the same company, operates regularly between Naas and the Institute of Technology, Blanchardstown.

== Sport ==
There are 10 golf courses within 16 km (10 mi) of the town, including the K Club, where the 1995 European Open was held, and which hosted the 2006 Ryder Cup.

Clane Rugby Club has two senior sides and a youth program, with pitches situated on the Ballinagappa Road.

Clane GAA is located on the Prosperous Road and is one of the most successful senior clubs in Kildare. The club last won the Kildare Senior Football Championship in 1997. Clane United is the local soccer club.

== Education ==
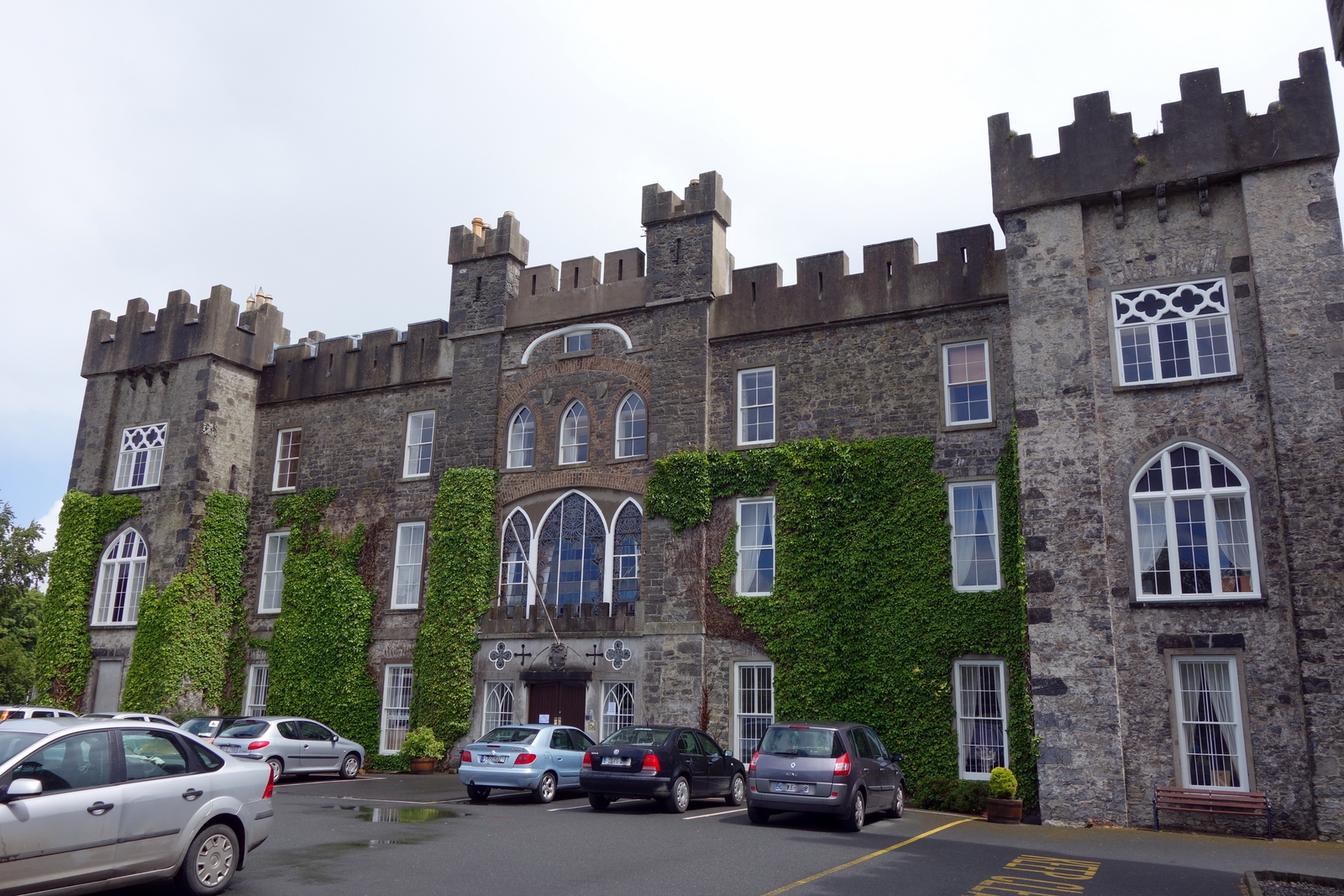
Clongowes Wood College

Primary schools (national schools) serving the area include Hewetsons N.S. (located near Millicent), Scoil Bhríde G.N.S. (on the Prosperous Road), and Scoil Phádraig B.N.S. (also on the Prosperous Road).

Secondary schools serving the area include Scoil Mhuire Community School and Clongowes Wood College.

According to the 2011 census, 53% of residents of Clane have completed second-level education and 38.4% had gone on to third level.

== Religion ==
Saint Patrick's & Saint Brigid's Church is the Catholic place of worship, part of the Catholic parish of Clane and Rathcoffey. It first opened in 1884 and was renovated after a 2008 fire that left the church unsafe. The local Church of Ireland church is Church of St Michael and All Angels, Millicent (C of I parish of Clane and Donadea), a 19th-century building noted for its architecture and interior. Mainham Cemetery is to the north, a medieval site with Knights Hospitaller fortified church and a Gaelic Irish mound.

== In literature ==
The town of Clane is one of the settings in the early life of Stephen Daedalus, the protagonist in James Joyce's novel, A Portrait of the Artist as a Young Man. (Joyce had been educated at nearby Clongowes Wood College).

== People ==
- Willam Dongan, 1st Earl of Limerick (ca. 1626–1698), was a supporter of King Charles I of England during the English Civil War and the contemporary wars in Ireland; afterwards he worked for the restoration of King Charles II of England. He was a landowner in Clane barony with 32,000 acres (12,950 ha) in Ireland.
- Charles Handy, social commentator
- Graham Hopkins, musician
- Josef Locke, tenor
- Rob Smith, musician and DJ
- Mark Walsh, jockey
- Ronnie Wood, musician

== See also ==
- List of towns and villages in Ireland

== Bibliography ==
- Hermann Geissel, 1996: The Shady Road to Clane
- Bryan Sammon, Paddy Behan and Liam Burke, 2006: Clane: The Village We Knew
- Journal the Kildare Archaeological Society, references include Volume I: pp17, 25–33, 91, 168, 189, 292, 311, 312, 313. Volume II: pp50–51, 158, 370, 457(Corrigenda). Volume IV: pp35–46, 68, 460. Volume V: pp349. Volume VI: pp180, 302–303, 343, and on specific topics:
- Bridge of Clane, Volume III: p106.
- Clane Abbey Volume III: pp101–106.
- Clane Abbeyland Volume XIII: p64.
- Clane Priory Volume III: pp105–106. Volume XII: p393.
- Clane Rangers Volume VI: p347.
- Clergy of Clane, Volume IV: pp36, 44, 46, 169.
- Moat at Clane, Volume I: pp27, 313, 405. Volume III: pp107–111.
- Parish Register of Clane, Volume IV: pp40–41.
- St. Brigid's thimble, chair, road and well Volume III: p269.
- Union of Clane Volume XVII: pp118–120.
- Clane & Rathcoffey Ecclesiastical History Committee, 2011: A History of Christianity in Clane & Rathcoffey
