= Newbridge RFC (Ireland) =

Irish rugby union club based in Rosetown, Co.Kildare

(Ireland) Newbridge
- Full name: Newbridge Rugby Football Club
- Union: IRFU; Leinster
- Nickname: The Bridge
- Founded: 1996; 30 years ago
- Ground(s): Rosetown, Athgarvan (Capacity: 3,000)
Team kit

Newbridge RFC is an Irish rugby union club based in County Kildare, playing in Division 2A of the Leinster League.

== History ==
The club was founded in 1996 after the amalgamation of the Curragh and Old Kilcullen clubs.

Close to the end of the 1995/1996 season, it seemed clear that the future of rugby in County Kildare was under threat. Despite them having very successful youth teams, both the Curragh and Old Kilcullen clubs were struggling a great deal because of those players moving away.

In May 1995, there were talks of a possible merger between them, but had fizzled out by August of that year. They eventually resumed with their plans in November, with both clubs being represented by four executive members each.

== Honours ==
- Leinster League Division Two: Winners 2007/2008
- Leinster League Division Three: Winners 2004/2005
- North Midlands Hosie Cup Winners 1996/1997, Runners up 2009/2010.
- North Midlands Lalor Cup J2 Winners 2006/2007, Runners up 2010/2011
- North Midlands Spiers Cup J3 Winners 2007/2008
- Anderson Cup Provincial J3 Winners 1996/1997
- Dunne Cup Provincial J4 Towns Cup Winners 2009/2010
- Leinster League Division 2 2nds Winners 2005/2006
- Leinster League Division 1B, Winners 2009/2010
- Naas Floodlit Cup: 2003
- Provincial Towns Seconds Cup : Winners 2011/2012,
- Provincial Towns Seconds Cup : Winners 2012/2013.
- North Midlands Hosie Cup : Winners 2012/2013, 2025/2026.
- Leinster League Division 2B : Winners 2024/2025
- Provincial Towns Plate : Winners 2024/2025
