= King Mesgegra's Mound =

Historic royal site in County Kildare, Ireland

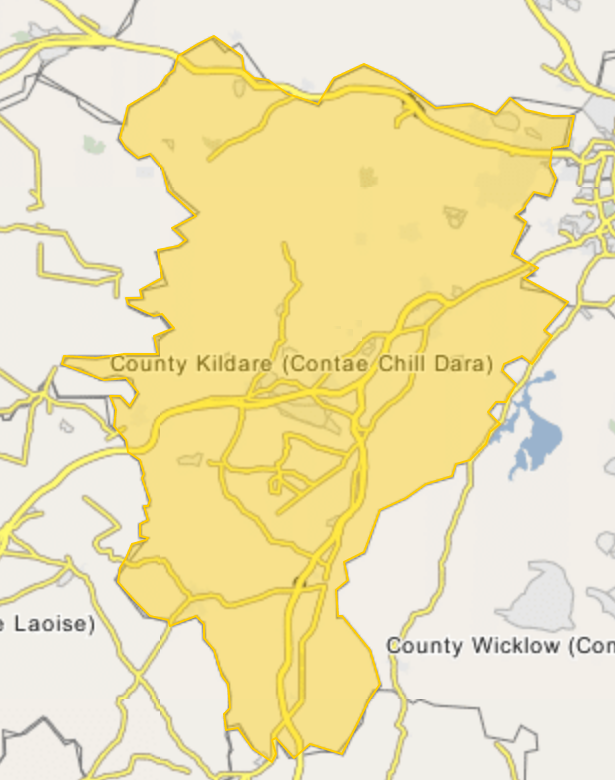
- Location within County Kildare
- 53.287093°N 6.684180°W
- Type: Motte
- Periods: Iron Age
- Location: Carrigeen, Clane, County Kildare, Ireland

Site notes
- Material: earth
- Diameter: 43 m (141 ft)
- Public access: yes

King Mesgegra's Mound is a motte and ancient Irish royal site located in Clane, County Kildare, Ireland.

== Location ==
King Mesgegra's Mound is located south of Clane, 160 metres (540 ft) northwest of a fording point on the River Liffey.

== History and archaeology ==
According to Ulster Cycle legends, Mesgegra, King of Leinster, confronted the Ulster warrior Conall Cernach at the ford in Clane. Conall beheaded Mesgegra at the bullaun stone and placed his head in the hollow. Mesgegra's body was buried under King Mesgegra's Mound, while his head was buried at Mainham Cemetery, north of Clane, along with his wife Buan. This story is recounted in Tallaind Etair ("The Siege of Howth") in the 12th-century Book of Leinster.

The mound was later built on in the 12th century by the Normans who took control of Clane, probably by Richard de Hereford.

Sunday's Well, a warm spring now covered over, is at its base. At 13 °C (55 °F), it is one of only ten such springs in Ireland.
