= North Kildare RFC =

Irish rugby union club based in Kilcock, County Kildare

(Republic of Ireland) North Kildare
- Full name: North Kildare Rugby Football Club
- Union: IRFU; Leinster
- Founded: 1928; 98 years ago
- Ground(s): The Maws, Kilcock

North Kildare RFC is an Irish rugby union team based between Maynooth and Kilcock, County Kildare. It is part of the North Kildare Club, which also includes cricket, hockey, bowls, tennis and bridge sections. The rugby club, whose colours are cerise, white and blue, caters for adult, youths, mini and girls rugby.

As of 2025, the club's first was playing in Division 2A of the Leinster League. Its teams also participate in IRFU Leinster Branch and North Midlands Area competitions. The First XV were promoted to Division 2A of the Leinster League at the end of the 2015 season, the second promotion in 3 years. In the 2015/16 season the club finished 3rd in 1B, the highest the club had ever reached in Leinster since the Leinster League began in 1993/94.

== Notable former players ==
- Bob Casey
- Devin Toner
- Will Connors

== Honours ==
- Provincial Towns Cup: 1953, 1958
- Leinster League (J2s) Division 2A: 2023/2024
- Leinster League Division Three: 1999/2000, 2005/2006, 2008/2009, 2010/2011
- Leinster League Division Two A: 2014/5
