= CYM RFC =

(Ireland) CYM RFC
- Full name: CYM Rugby Football Club
- Union: IRFU; Leinster
- Founded: 1924
- Ground(s): Terenure Road North, Dublin
Team kit

CYM RFC is an Irish rugby team based in Terenure, Dublin who play in the Leinster Metro League. The club colours are green, purple and white. In addition to rugby, the club also runs among others tennis, bowls, table tennis, cricket and football sections.

== History ==
The club was founded in 1924 by eight members of the Catholic Young Men's Society. Later that year saw the acquisition of St. Mary's, the club's headquarters, which is still in use. In the spring of 1925 the first CYM side took the field changed in stables, accompanied by a horse used for cutting grass and rolling the field.

== Notable officials ==
- E.J. Daly, President of the IRFU Leinster Branch 1952/53
- Eddie Egan, President of the IRFU Leinster Branch 1982/83

== Friendship Cup ==
The Friendship Cup is an annual match between CYM and Haddington RFC. Both teams have been playing this historic fixture since 1949, making it the longest running rivalry (and friendly) between an Irish and a Scottish club.

== Honours ==
- Leinster League Division Three: 1994/1995
- John Madden Cup 2022/2023
- John Madden Cup 2023/2024
