= Leinster League =

Junior rugby union league in Leinster, Ireland

- Sport: Rugby union
- No. of teams: 32 (2026–27)
- Country: Ireland
- Most recent champion: Boyne (2025–26)
- Promotion to: All-Ireland League (via the All-Ireland Provincial League Championship)
- Website: leinsterrugby.ie

The Leinster League, also referred to as the Leinster Junior League, is the top league competition for rugby union clubs in the province of Leinster that play below the national All-Ireland League (AIL). In Irish club rugby, clubs outside the AIL are classed as junior clubs, while AIL members hold senior status. The league is run by the Leinster Branch of the Irish Rugby Football Union (Leinster Rugby).

The champions of Division 1A represent Leinster in the All-Ireland Provincial League Championship, a play-off between the winners of the four provincial junior leagues which offers promotion to the AIL.

For the 2026–27 season the league consists of 32 clubs split into four divisions of eight: Division 1A, Division 1B, Division 2A and Division 2B. The current Division 1A champions are Boyne, who won the 2025–26 title.

== Format ==
=== League structure ===
Each division is played as a double round-robin, with every club meeting each of the others home and away; Division 1A is a 14-game league. The season runs from September to early March. The 2026–27 Division 1A campaign opened on 12 September 2026, while the 2024–25 title was settled on the final day of the league, 1 March 2025. This leaves the provincial champions free to contest the All-Ireland Provincial League Championship in March and April.

The Division 1A champions are presented with the Eddie Egan Memorial Trophy.

Most Leinster League clubs also enter their second XV in the Seconds League (J2), which is organised into corresponding divisions. Leinster's AIL clubs field their second and lower teams in the separate Metro League.

=== Promotion and relegation ===
At the end of each season the bottom club in Divisions 1A, 1B and 2A is relegated, and the champions of Divisions 1B, 2A and 2B are promoted. The runners-up in Divisions 1B, 2A and 2B can also go up through a promotion/relegation play-off against the second-from-bottom club in the division above.

Whether these play-offs take place depends on movement between the Leinster League and the AIL. When a Leinster club is relegated from the AIL and the Division 1A champions are not promoted to take its place, the play-offs are not held, and the second-from-bottom club in Division 1A can be relegated automatically. If the Division 1A champions do win promotion to the AIL, the play-offs go ahead.

The league also sits within the national club pyramid. Leinster clubs relegated from the AIL drop into the Leinster League, as Bective Rangers did in 2018, while the Division 1A champions can win promotion to the AIL through the All-Ireland Provincial League Championship.

=== All-Ireland Provincial League Championship ===
The Division 1A champions join the winners of the Connacht Junior League, the Munster Junior League and Ulster Rugby's Championship 1 in the All-Ireland Provincial League Championship. The four clubs meet in two semi-finals, played as a double-header at a single venue, and the semi-final winners contest the final. The winner is promoted to the AIL; from 2026–27 this means a place in the league's new regionalised Division 2B North or Division 2B South.

In recent seasons the beaten finalist has also been given a promotion/relegation play-off against an AIL club. In 2024, Leinster champions Monkstown lost the final to Ballyclare but then won promotion by beating Bangor in the play-off.

The knockout format was introduced in 2022. Before that, the provincial champions contested a round-robin series: the table-toppers were promoted to the AIL, and the runners-up played off against the second lowest AIL club.

=== All-Ireland Junior Cup ===
The top four clubs in Division 1A qualify for the following season's All-Ireland Junior Cup, a knockout competition for the top four junior clubs from each of the four provinces. If one of those clubs wins promotion to the AIL, its place passes to the next club in the table. Athy, for example, finished fifth in 2024–25 and entered the 2025–26 competition after Bective Rangers were promoted.

== History ==
=== Early seasons and the round-robin era ===
The league was running by the early 2000s. Kilkenny won it for the first time in 2001–02, during the most successful season in the club's history.

Seapoint won 13 of their 14 league games in 2009–10, then topped the provincial round-robin to earn a place in the AIL's Division 3 for 2010–11. Boyne won Division 1A in 2010–11 and reached the AIL, beginning a six-year spell at senior level. Skerries, the 2011–12 champions, were also promoted. Tullamore won the league for the first time in 2012–13, and Wanderers topped the 2014 round-robin as Leinster champions. Dundalk won 12 of their 14 league games in 2014–15. They then won the round-robin and beat De La Salle Palmerston 22–10 in a play-off to earn a place in the AIL's new Division 2C.

Enniscorthy represented Leinster in 2016 but lost the play-off to Sligo after finishing second in the round-robin. Malahide won their first Division 1A title in 2016–17, only a season after coming up from Division 1B. They clinched it with a 17–16 win away to Enniscorthy and went on to win the round-robin. Ashbourne took their first title in 2017–18, eight points clear of Enniscorthy, but the round-robin was won by Connacht's Ballina. Enniscorthy finally broke through in 2018–19. Beaten only once in 14 league games, they won the title with two rounds to spare, sealing it with a home win over Kilkenny, and then won the round-robin to return to senior rugby for the first time since 1931.

The 2019–20 season was brought to an early end in March 2020 by the COVID-19 pandemic, and that year's round-robin qualifiers were not played.

=== Recent seasons ===
Bective Rangers, relegated to the junior ranks in 2018, won back-to-back Division 1A titles in 2021–22 and 2022–23, but were beaten in the promotion play-offs by Instonians and Clogher Valley respectively. Monkstown took the 2023–24 title, finishing on 61 points, twelve clear of Seapoint; they lost the provincial final to Ballyclare but secured senior status through the play-off against Bangor. Bective regained the title in 2024–25, their third in four seasons, and beat Munster champions Thomond 39–34 in the final at Cill Dara RFC to return to the AIL.

Boyne, promoted as Division 1B champions in 2024–25, won Division 1A at the first attempt in 2025–26, their first top-flight title since 2011. They reached the All-Ireland Provincial League Championship final but lost 46–8 to Enniskillen at the Palace Grounds in Armagh, and remain in Division 1A for 2026–27.

In 2025–26 the lowest tier was run as a combined Division 2B/3 of eleven clubs, with the top five meeting again in a second phase. Portlaoise won promotion to Division 2A by beating Roscrea 25–17 in a final-day decider.

== Clubs (2026–27) ==
=== Division 1A ===
The following eight clubs are competing in Division 1A in 2026–27:

Club	Location	Ground
Athy	Athy	The Showgrounds
Boyne	Drogheda	Shamrock Lodge
Dundalk	Dundalk	Mill Road
Seapoint	Killiney	Kilbogget Park
Suttonians	Dublin (Sutton)	John J McDowell Memorial Grounds
Tullamore	Tullamore	Spollenstown
Tullow	Tullow	Black Gates
Wicklow	Wicklow	Ashtown Lane

=== Division 1B ===
The following eight clubs are competing in Division 1B in 2026–27:

Club	Location	Ground
Ashbourne	Ashbourne	Milltown House
Coolmine	Dublin (Clonsilla)	Ashbrook
County Carlow	Carlow	Oak Park
De La Salle Palmerston	Dublin (Kilternan)	Kirwan Park
Gorey	Gorey	Clonattin
Kilkenny	Kilkenny	Foulkstown
Mullingar	Mullingar	Shay Murtagh Park
Wexford Wanderers	Wexford	Park Lane

=== Division 2A ===
The following eight clubs are competing in Division 2A in 2026–27:

Club	Location	Ground
Cill Dara	Kildare	Silken Thomas Park
Clondalkin	Dublin (Clondalkin)	Baldonnel Farm
Longford	Longford	Precision Health Park
New Ross	New Ross	FBD Park
Newbridge	Newbridge	Rosetown
North Kildare	Kilcock	The Maws
Portlaoise	Portlaoise	Togher
Roscrea	Roscrea	Streamstown

=== Division 2B ===
The following eight clubs are competing in Division 2B in 2026–27:

Club	Location	Ground
Arklow	Arklow	The Oval
Balbriggan	Balrothery	Bowhill
Clane	Clane	Ballinagappa Road
Edenderry	Carbury	Coolavacoose
Garda	Westmanstown	Westmanstown
Midland Warriors		
North Meath	Kells	The Grange
Portarlington	Portarlington	Lea Road

== Champions by League ==
=== Division 1A champions ===
Until 2008–09 the top tier was known as Division 1.

Season	Champions	Outcome in the promotion series	Ref.
2001–02	Kilkenny	Unknown	
2002–03	Unknown	Unknown	
2003–04	Unknown	Unknown	
2004–05	Unknown	Unknown	
2005–06	Unknown	Unknown	
2006–07	Naas	Promoted	
2007–08	Cill Dara	Not Promoted	
2008–09	Navan	Promoted	
2009–10	Seapoint	Won the round-robin; promoted to the AIL	
2010–11	Boyne	Promoted to the AIL	
2011–12	Skerries	Promoted to the AIL	
2012–13	Tullamore	Promoted	
2013–14	Wanderers	Won the round-robin; promoted to the AIL	
2014–15	Dundalk	Won the round-robin and play-off; promoted to the AIL	
2015–16	Enniscorthy	Round-robin runners-up; lost play-off to Sligo	
2016–17	Malahide	Won the round-robin; promoted to the AIL	
2017–18	Ashbourne	Not promoted	
2018–19	Enniscorthy	Won the round-robin; promoted to the AIL	
2019–20	Ashbourne	Not held (COVID-19 pandemic)	
2020–21	Not held (COVID-19 pandemic)	Not held	
2021–22	Bective Rangers	Not promoted (beaten by Instonians)	
2022–23	Bective Rangers	Not promoted (lost semi-final to Clogher Valley)	
2023–24	Monkstown	Lost final to Ballyclare; promoted via play-off	
2024–25	Bective Rangers	Won final 39–34 v Thomond; promoted to the AIL	
2025–26	Boyne	Lost final 8–46 to Enniskillen; not promoted	

=== Division 1B champions ===
Division 1B was first contested in 2009–10.

Season	Champions	Ref.
2009–10	Coolmine	
2010–11	Garda Westmanstown	
2011–12	Cill Dara	
2012–13	Tullow	
2013–14	Ashbourne	
2014–15	Kilkenny	
2015–16	Malahide	
2016–17	Wicklow	
2017–18	Kilkenny	
2018–19	Suttonians	
2019–20	Monkstown	
2020–21	Not held (COVID-19 pandemic)	
2021–22	Boyne	
2022–23	Tullow	
2023–24	County Carlow	
2024–25	Boyne	
2025–26	Dundalk	

=== Division 2A champions ===
Until 2008–09 this tier was known as Division 2.

Season	Champions	Ref.
2006–07	Ashbourne	
2007–08	Newbridge	
2008–09	Coolmine	
2009–10	Portarlington	
2010–11	Longford	
2011–12	Portarlington	
2012–13	Kilkenny	
2013–14	Gorey	
2014–15	North Kildare	
2015–16	Portlaoise	
2016–17	Longford	
2017–18	County Carlow	
2018–19	Clondalkin	
2019–20	Mullingar	
2020–21	Not held (COVID-19 pandemic)	
2021–22	Athy	
2022–23	De La Salle Palmerston	
2023–24	Mullingar	
2024–25	Clondalkin	
2025–26	Coolmine	

=== Division 2B champions ===
Division 2B was first contested in 2011–12.

Season	Champions	Ref.
2011–12	Gorey	
2012–13	Railway Union	
2013–14	New Ross	
2014–15	Edenderry	
2015–16	Roscrea	
2016–17	New Ross	
2017–18	Wexford Wanderers	
2018–19	Edenderry	
2019–20	Athy	
2020–21	Not held (COVID-19 pandemic)	
2021–22	New Ross	
2022–23	Edenderry	
2023–24	Roscrea	
2024–25	Newbridge	
2025–26	Portlaoise	

=== Division 3 champions ===
Season	Champions	Ref.
2006–07	Tullow	
2007–08	Rathdrum	
2008–09	North Kildare	
2009–10	—N/a	
2010–11	—N/a	
2011–12	Guinness	
2012–13	Wexford Wanderers	
2013–14	Swords	
2014–15	Wexford Wanderers	
2015–16	Arklow	
2016–17	North Meath	
2017–18	Garda Westmanstown	
2018–19	North Meath	
2019–20	Roscrea	
2020–21	Not held (COVID-19 pandemic)	
2021–22	Portarlington	
2022–23	North Meath	
2023–24	Ratoath	
2024–25	Midland Warriors	
2025–26	Clane	

== (Roll of Honour) ==
=== Division 1A ===
The following clubs have won the top tier of the Leinster League (Division 1 until 2008–09 and Division 1A since 2009–10). Only seasons for which the champions are known are included.

Club	Titles	Winning seasons
Bective Rangers	3	2021–22, 2022–23, 2024–25
Boyne	2	2010–11, 2025–26
Ashbourne	2	2017–18, 2019–20
Enniscorthy	2	2015–16, 2018–19
Monkstown	1	2023–24
Malahide	1	2016–17
Dundalk	1	2014–15
Wanderers	1	2013–14
Tullamore	1	2012–13
Skerries	1	2011–12
Seapoint	1	2009–10
Navan	1	2008–09
Cill Dara	1	2007–08
Naas	1	2006–07
Kilkenny	1	2001–02

=== Division 1B ===
Club	Titles	Winning seasons
Boyne	2	2021–22, 2024–25
Tullow	2	2012–13, 2022–23
Kilkenny	2	2014–15, 2017–18
Dundalk	1	2025–26
County Carlow	1	2023–24
Monkstown	1	2019–20
Suttonians	1	2018–19
Wicklow	1	2016–17
Malahide	1	2015–16
Ashbourne	1	2013–14
Cill Dara	1	2011–12
Garda Westmanstown	1	2010–11
Coolmine	1	2009–10

=== Division 2A ===
Includes Division 2, as the tier was known until 2008–09.

Club	Titles	Winning seasons
Coolmine	2	2008–09, 2025–26
Clondalkin	2	2018–19, 2024–25
Mullingar	2	2019–20, 2023–24
Longford	2	2010–11, 2016–17
Portarlington	2	2009–10, 2011–12
De La Salle Palmerston	1	2022–23
Athy	1	2021–22
County Carlow	1	2017–18
Portlaoise	1	2015–16
North Kildare	1	2014–15
Gorey	1	2013–14
Kilkenny	1	2012–13
Newbridge	1	2007–08
Ashbourne	1	2006–07

=== Division 2B ===
Club	Titles	Winning seasons
Edenderry	3	2014–15, 2018–19, 2022–23
New Ross	3	2013–14, 2016–17, 2021–22
Roscrea	2	2015–16, 2023–24
Portlaoise	1	2025–26
Newbridge	1	2024–25
Athy	1	2019–20
Wexford Wanderers	1	2017–18
Railway Union	1	2012–13
Gorey	1	2011–12

=== Division 3 ===
Club	Titles	Winning seasons
North Meath	3	2016–17, 2018–19, 2022–23
Wexford Wanderers	2	2012–13, 2014–15
Clane	1	2025–26
Midland Warriors	1	2024–25
Ratoath	1	2023–24
Portarlington	1	2021–22
Roscrea	1	2019–20
Garda Westmanstown	1	2017–18
Arklow	1	2015–16
Swords	1	2013–14
Guinness	1	2011–12
North Kildare	1	2008–09
Rathdrum	1	2007–08
Tullow	1	2006–07

== See also ==
- All-Ireland League (rugby union)
- All-Ireland Junior Cup (rugby union)
- Provincial Towns Cup
- Metropolitan Cup
- Leinster Senior League (rugby union)
- Munster Junior League (rugby union)
- Leinster Rugby
