= Longford RFC =

Irish rugby union club based in Longford, Co.Longford

(Ireland) Longford
- Full name: Longford Rugby Football Club
- Union: IRFU; Leinster
- Founded: 1921; 105 years ago
- Ground(s): CPL Park, Longford
- President: Karen Lennon
- Coach: Glen Baskett
- Captain: Alan Crowe
Team kit

Longford RFC is an Irish rugby union team based in Longford, County Longford, playing in Division 2A of the Leinster League. The club colours are black and white.

== History ==
Longford can certainly stake a claim as one of the oldest clubs in Ireland. It is widely accepted that there was some rugby in the area during the 1890s, owing to the presence of two army garrisons. However, it was only in 1921 that the formal establishment of a club was recorded.

The club ceased its playing activities in the post-war years, but remained affiliated to the IRFU in order to secure tickets to international matches. They started playing again in 1967.

== Notable players ==
- William Frazer 'Horsey' Browne
- Mel Deane
- Shane Mallon
