= Rathdrum RFC =

Irish rugby union club in Rathdrum, Co. Wicklow

(Ireland) Rathdrum
- Full name: Rathdrum Rugby Football Club
- Union: IRFU; Leinster
- Ground(s): Ivy Leaf Grounds, Rathdrum
Team kit

Rathdrum RFC is an Irish rugby team based in Rathdrum, County Wicklow.
