= Arklow RFC =

Irish rugby union club based in Arklow, Co. Wicklow

(Ireland) Arklow
- Full name: Arklow Rugby Football Club
- Union: IRFU; Leinster
- Nickname: ARFC
- Founded: 1936; 90 years ago
- Ground(s): The Oval, Arklow
Team kit

Arklow RFC is an Irish rugby team based in Arklow, County Wicklow, playing in Division 2B of the Leinster League. The club colours are black and red. The club was founded in 1936 and plays its home games at The Oval in Arklow. Among the club's most notable alumni is Leslie Griffin, who represented Ireland in the 1949 Five Nations Championship, becoming one of the few Arklow RFC players to earn senior international honours. The club operates under the Leinster branch of the Irish Rugby Football Union and competes in Division 2B of the Leinster League. They have a 1st and 2nd Senior team, ladies team (the Arklow Amazons). The club also has 18s, 16s, u14s and u12s girls teams and Under 16s, u15, u14s boys teams.
