= New Ross RFC =

Irish rugby union club based in New Ross, Co. Wexford

(Republic of Ireland) New Ross RFC
- Full name: New Ross Rugby Football Club
- Founded: 1970; 56 years ago
- Location: County Wexford, Ireland
- Ground: Southknock
- League(s): Leinster League Division 2A; Leinster Towns Cup
Team kit

New Ross RFC is an Irish rugby union team based in New Ross, County Wexford, playing in Division 2A of the Leinster League.

Along with fielding competitive Men's J1 and J2 teams weekly (along with a 3rd team for competing in the Anderson Cup / Provincial J3), New Ross also has a ladies team and an underage section. The underage section ranges from under-8s up to youth levels. The club's youth section has provided the club with both Provincial and International representation.

New Ross RFC is the home club of Irish international Tadhg Furlong. Furlong played rugby in New Ross from minis up to under-19s. In 2010, he helped New Ross win the Leinster League premier division, playing on a team that also included three-time All-Ireland winning hurler Walter Walsh.

== Leinster League history ==
- 2019/2020 - Finished 3rd in LL Division 2B
- 2018/2019 - Relegated from LL Division 2A
- 2017/2018 – Finished 6th in division 2A
- 2016/2017 – Winners of Leinster League division 2B
- 2015/2016 – Relegated from LL division 2A
- 2014/2015 – Finished 5th in LL Division 2A
- 2013/2014 – Winners of Division Leinster League division 2B
- 2012/2013 – Relegated from LL Division 2A
- 2011/2012 – Finished 5th in LL Division 2A
- 2010/2011 – Relegated from LL Division 1B
- 2009/2010 – Finished 4th in Division 1B

== Notable players ==
- Tadhg Furlong
