= Tullow =

Town in County Carlow, Ireland

Tullow An Tulach (Irish)
- Town
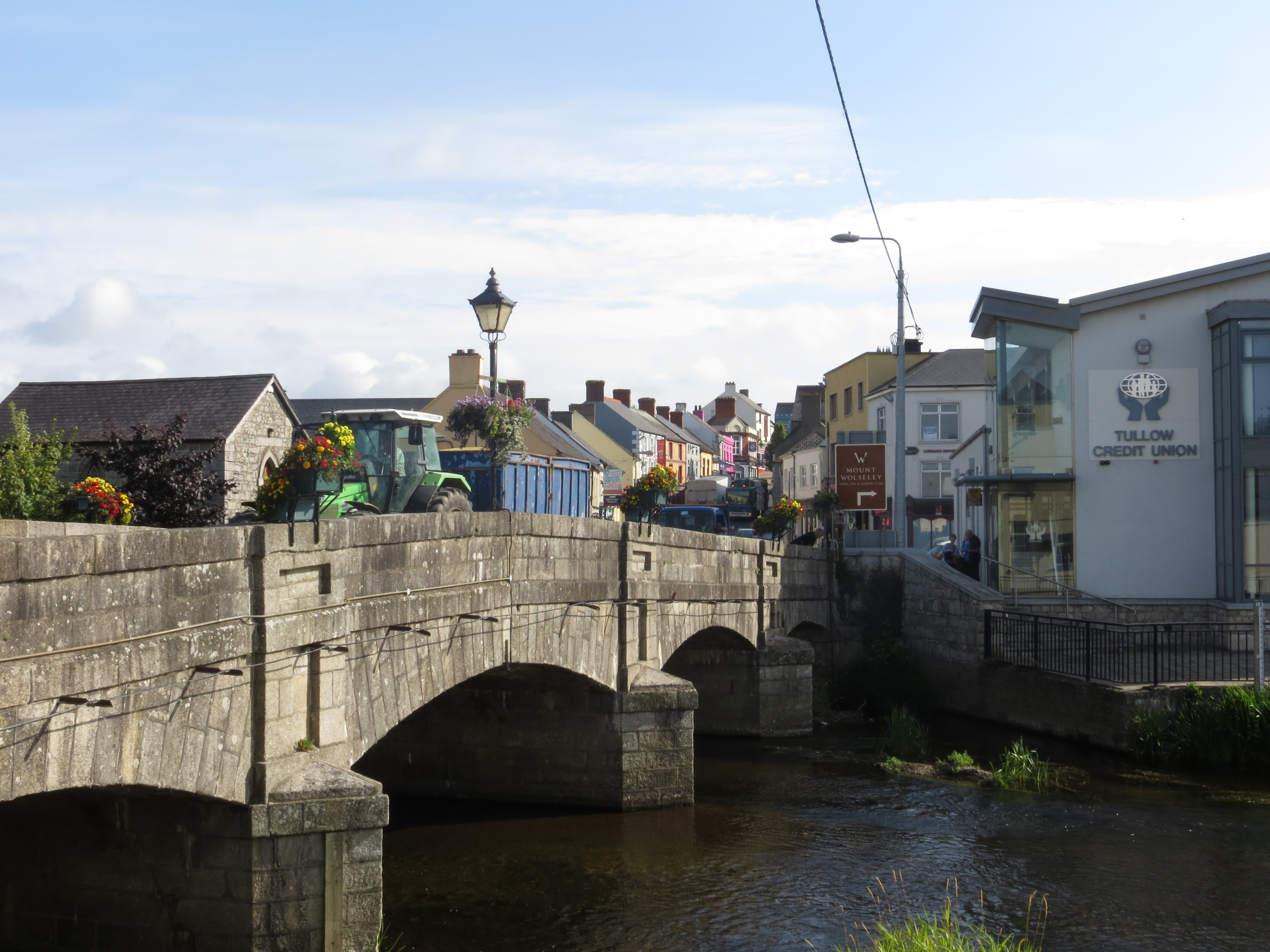
- N81 crossing the River Slaney in the centre of Tullow

- Location in Ireland
- Coordinates: 52.8003°N 6.7369°W
- Country: Ireland
- Province: Leinster
- County: County Carlow
- Elevation: 95 m (312 ft)

Population (2022)
  - Total: 5,138
- Time zone: UTC±0 (WET)
  - Summer (DST): UTC+1 (IST)
- Eircode routing key: R93
- Telephone area code: +353(0)59
- Irish Grid Reference: S852728

Tullow (/ˈtʊloʊ/; Irish: An Tulach, meaning 'the hillock'), formerly Tullowphelim (Irish: Tulach Ó bhFéidhlim), is a market town in County Carlow, Ireland. It is located on the River Slaney where the N81 road intersects with the R725. As of 2022, the population was 5,138. Tullowphelim is the name of both a townland and civil parish in which Tullow lies.

== History ==
Anglo-Norman landowner Hugh de Lacy built a castle in Tullow c. 1181 at the site of a crossing on the river Slaney. The castle was captured by Oliver Cromwell in 1650. There are no extant remains of the castle and the circumstances of its demolition are uncertain. The castle may have been pulled down during the reign of Queen Anne and the stones used in the construction of a barracks in the town.

A monastery and school was founded in the fifth century in Tullow by St Fortchern (or Fortiarnán), a pupil of St Patrick and St Lommán. Although there are no traces of the monastery today, a granite font and cross base at St. Columba's Church in Tullow may be associated with it. Tullowphelim holy well is located on Barrack Street in Tullow. It is dedicated to the Virgin Mary, mother of Jesus. It is reputed to be the site of the monastery founded by St Fortiarnán. The current shrine dates to the 1920s. A pattern was held annually on 8 September until about 1800. The Book of Lecan and the Book of Ballymote mention that Saint Darchaorthainn (Derchartainn) and her sister St. Eithne the daughters of Cormac were nuns at Tullow and are believed to be buried in the vicinity. They along with Fortchern and Toranann are regarded as the patron saints of Tullow.

Tullow was also the site of an Augustinian friary. During the dissolution of the monasteries, the land belonging to the friary was granted to James Butler, 9th Earl of Ormond. Similarly to Tullow Castle, the friary buildings were demolished but the exact date is uncertain. The Abbey Cemetery is located within the site of the former monastery.

There is a statue of Father John Murphy, one of the leaders of the 1798 Rebellion, who was captured near Tullow and executed in the Market Square on 2 July. There is a small museum with information about this period and other local history located in the former Tullow Methodist church on Bridge Street.

Bishop Daniel Delany founded the Brigidine Sisters in Tullow in 1807.

The Tullow Agricultural Show takes place every August just outside the town.

== Sport ==
=== Gaelic games ===
St. Patrick's are the local GAA club in the town. They currently compete at Intermediate level of Gaelic football in Carlow and have been crowned Senior champions on ten occasions. There is currently no hurling team in Tullow with the club last fielding a team at Junior level back in 2020.

=== Association football ===
Parkville United AFC, who play at Hawkins Lane Tullow, compete in the Carlow premier division and Slaney Rovers AFC from Rathvilly, who play at Tullow town pitch.

=== Rugby union ===
Tullow RFC are the local rugby team. Former Ireland international player Seán O'Brien played with the club.

== Literature ==
There is quote in Brendan Behan's Borstal Boy that mentions Tullow: "Littlewood was twenty and married. We thought he was as old as the Hills of Tullow."

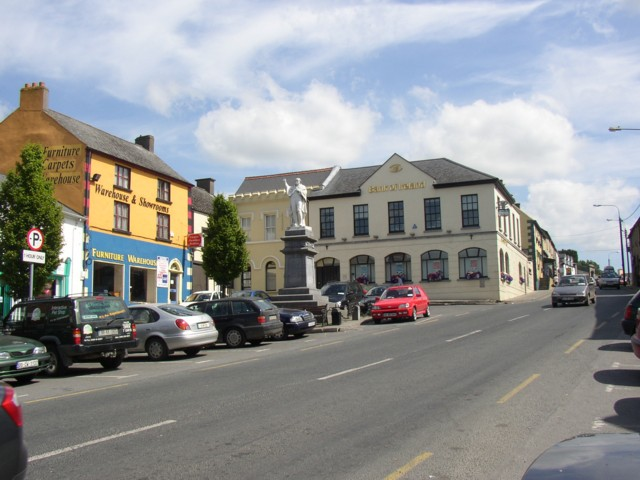
Statue of Father John Murphy, Tullow.

== Transport ==
=== Railway ===
The town was at one time connected to the Irish railway network, on a branch line from Naas in County Kildare. Tullow railway station opened on 1 June 1886, closed for passenger and goods traffic in 1947 and finally closed on 1 April 1959.

=== Bus ===
Bus Éireann route 132 provides a once a day each way (Mondays to Fridays inclusive) commuter link to Dublin via Tallaght. There are also a limited range (usually one/two journeys a day each way) of Bus Éireann Expressway services linking the town to Dublin, New Ross, Waterford and Rosslare Europort. JJ Kavanagh and Sons route from Hacketstown to Carlow also serves the town. The main stopping place for buses is on the Square.

== Weather ==
A local weather station operates in Tullow, which records all local weather and provides a five-day local forecast. Tullow recorded the lowest temperature in 2010 at −17.7 °C. It is also based in a basin so the weather patterns are slightly different.

== Business ==
Tullow Oil is one of Europe's largest independent exploration and production companies with worldwide operations.

== Notable people ==
- Christabel Bielenberg, author of The Past is Myself, lived in Tullow.
- Herbie Brennan, author of the young adult Faerie Wars series, lives in Tullow.
- Daniel Delany, Bishop of Kildare and Leighlin, founded the Brigidine Sisters in 1807 and the Patrician Brothers in 1808.
- Denis Donoghue, literary critic, was born in Tullow.
- Seán O'Brien, professional rugby union player for Leinster and Ireland is from Ardristan, Tullow and played for local teams - Tullow CS and Tullow RFC
- Saoirse Ronan, Oscar nominated actress went to school in Ardattin, Tullow.

== See also ==
- List of abbeys and priories in Ireland (County Carlow)
- List of towns and villages in Ireland
- Market Houses in Ireland
