= Roscrea RFC =

Irish rugby union club, based in Roscrea, Co. Tipperary

(Ireland) Roscrea
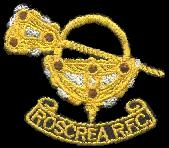
- Roscrea RFC Crest
- Full name: Roscrea Rugby Football Club
- Union: IRFU; Leinster
- Founded: 1950; 76 years ago
- Ground(s): Streamstown, Roscrea
Team kit

Roscrea RFC is an Irish rugby union club based in Roscrea, County Tipperary, playing in Division 3 of the Leinster League. The club colours are maroon and white.

== History ==
A rugby club was formed in Roscrea following a meeting in 1940. This club, whose colours were all white, played its home games at Beechwalk. Travel was restricted during The Emergency (WWII), so games were limited and the club seems to have faded by 1944. Another club, the Rossory Rangers based at Shanboe, was also short-lived. Meanwhile, some Roscrea players played with Birr in subsequent years.

A meeting, to form a new Roscrea club, was held in March 1950. While the club looked at acquiring a pitch at Benamore and a site the Limerick road, a pitch was ultimately acquired at Mount Heaton. The new club's first official match, a friendly against Birr, was held on 1 October 1950.

The newly formed Roscrea club won the Garryowen Cup in 1952. However, it was not until 1970 that a second trophy, the Manseragh Cup, was won. In 1975 and 1980, the club won the Provincial Towns cup - the premier competition for junior clubs in Leinster. Midland's leagues were won during this period and they also qualified to compete in the Leinster senior cup twice. The structure of Leinster rugby changed in the 1990s with the junior league and 4 divisions.

For a number of years, Roscrea played in division two and in 1999 they gained promotion to division one. Roscrea had to compete against teams from larger towns like Dundalk, Kilkenny, Naas and Navan. This they did and finished in the top half of the league, retaining their division status.

Roscrea were relegated at the end of the 2017–18 season and, as of 2020, were playing in Division 3 of the Leinster League.

== Honours ==
- Garryowen Cup: 1953–'54
- Manseragh Cup: 1969–'70
- Emerson Cup: (Provincial 7-a-side) 1974–'75; 1977–'78
- Leinster Senior Cup: (Qualified) 1971–'72; 1979–'80
- Gale Cup: 1974–'75; 1976–'77; 1982–'83; 2000–'01; 2005–'06
- Provincial Towns Cup: 1974–'75; 1979–'80
- Provincial Towns Plate: 1976–'77; 1984–'85; 1997–'98; 2005–'06
- Midland League: 1970–'71; 1971–'72; 1979–'80; 2001–'02; 2006–'07
- Midland League 2nd XV: 1974–'75; 1976–'77; 1979–'80; 1983–'84; 2002–'03; 2003–'04; 2006–'07; 2009–'10; 2011–'12
