= Balbriggan RFC =

Rugby union team in County Dublin, Ireland

(Ireland) Balbriggan RFC
- Full name: Balbriggan Rugby Football Club
- Union: IRFU; Leinster
- Founded: 1925; 101 years ago

Balbriggan RFC is an Irish rugby union team based at Bowhill, Balrothery just outside of Balbriggan town. Founded in 1925, it is a junior club that plays in Division 2A of the Leinster League. The club colours are green and white.

The club's women's team plays in Division 1 of the Leinster League. The club also has youths boys and girls teams as well as men's, women's, minis and special needs teams. In 2020, the club opened a long anticipated clubhouse.

George Thomas Hamlet, a former president of the club, was also president of the Irish Rugby Football Union and played rugby for Ireland on 29 occasions. In 1928, Balbriggan won the Leinster Towns Cup defeating Athy.
