= Cill Dara RFC =

Irish rugby union club based in Kildare, Co.Kildare

(Ireland) Cill Dara RFC
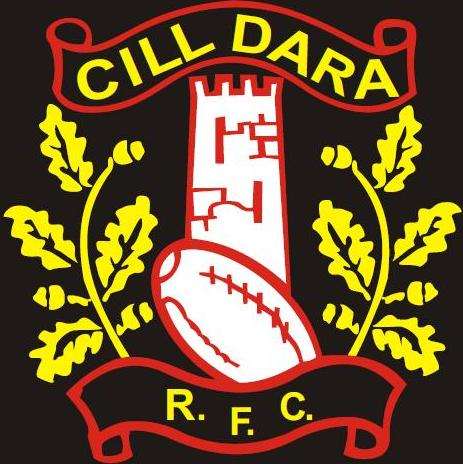
- Crest of Cill Dara RFC
- Full name: Cill Dara Rugby Football Club
- Union: IRFU; Leinster
- Founded: 1976; 50 years ago
- Ground(s): Silken Thomas Park, Kildare
- Chairman: Brian Flanagan
- Coach(es): Bernard Behan; Barry White; Wayne Kerr; Jack Ryan
Team kit

Cill Dara RFC is an Irish rugby union club based in Kildare, Leinster, playing in Division 2A of the Leinster League. The club's colours are a combination of red, white and black.

== History ==
Rev. Father E.D. O' Connor, O. Carm, and former president, Joe Flanagan, were the driving forces behind the founding of the club in 1976. The club affiliated to the Leinster Branch of the IRFU the next year.

The fledgling club found little success in their first seasons, but did field two teams.

The club grew over the next 40 years and counts Fergus McFadden as a former youth player. It currently has over 200 mini and youth members and fields two senior men's and one senior women's teams in an amalgamation with Naas, Newbridge, and Portarlington rugby clubs.
