= Gorey RFC =

Irish rugby union club based in Gorey, Co.Wexford

(Ireland) Gorey
- Full name: Gorey Rugby Football Club
- Union: IRFU; Leinster
- Nickname: none
- Founded: 1968; 58 years ago
- Ground(s): Clonattin, Gorey (Capacity: 1,500)
- Chairman: Eoin Canavan
- President: Declan Gibney
- Coach(es): Joe Duffy (Men) Tommy O'Reilly, Fergal Bolger, Tommy Martin, Dolores Hughes and Georgia Harris (Women)
Team kit

Gorey RFC is an Irish rugby union team based in Gorey, County Wexford, playing in Division 1A of the Leinster League. The senior ladies play in division 3. In 2016 they secured promotion via winning Div 3 and again in 2019. They also won the Paul Cusack cup back to back. Lack of players saw the women relegated back to division 3 in 2022.

The club colours are green, white and blue with black shorts. A team of great heart, dedication and serve a mean pint. They have secured a position in the 1A Leinster League (2015).

Gorey RFC have many sponsors and these include: French's, SuperValu, Stafford's Bakery, Weatherglaze, Casey Concrete, Gardiner Grain, James Tomkins Garage Ltd. and Wright Insurance Brokers.
