= Coolmine RFC =

Irish rugby union club, based in Ashbrook, Co.Dublin

(Ireland) Coolmine Rugby Football Club
- Founded: 1980; 46 years ago
- Location: Coolmine, Dublin, Ireland
- Ground: Ashbrook
- League: Leinster Senior League
Team kit

Coolmine Rugby Football club is a rugby union club located at Ashbrook, near the suburbs of Castleknock and Blanchardstown in west County Dublin, Ireland, playing in Division 2A of the Leinster League. The club was established in 1980. Coolmine RFC has junior club status in Leinster.

== History ==
Coolmine RFC was founded on 26 November 1980 in Coolmine, close to the growing suburbs of Blanchardstown and Castleknock by Mr. Eugene Cadogan and Dr Bill Linehan. The club originally played matches on pitches rented from the local council and used Coolmine Sports Complex as its main facility. The first mini rugby at Coolmine was played in 1981. The club won the Dowling cup for the first time in 1984. In 1985, new lands were purchased at nearby Ashbrook, and pitches were officially opened in 1987. In 1991, the club was promoted to the Junior 1 league and work began on a new clubhouse facility. The new clubhouse was officially opened by then President of Ireland, Mary Robinson, in 1993.

== Coolmine RFC today ==
Coolmine RFC's senior team currently plays in Division 2A of the Leinster League as a junior rugby club. The club has several senior teams, an under-20s team, a Vet's team, junior teams ranging from U12s to U16s, and mini rugby teams from U6 to U10 levels.
