= 1977 Five Nations Championship squads =

Rugby union competition squads

These are the 1977 Five Nations Championship squads:

== England ==
Head coach: Peter Colston

1. Bill Beaumont
2. Martin Cooper
3. Barrie Corless
4. Fran Cotton
5. Robin Cowling
6. Peter Dixon
7. Alastair Hignell
8. Nigel Horton
9. Charles Kent
10. Tony Neary
11. Mike Rafter
12. Mike Slemen
13. Steve Smith
14. Peter Squires
15. Roger Uttley (c.)
16. Peter Wheeler
17. Malcolm Young

== France ==
Head coach: Jean Desclaux

1. Jean-Michel Aguirre
2. Jean-Luc Averous
3. Jean-Pierre Bastiat
4. Roland Bertranne
5. Gérard Cholley
6. Jacques Fouroux (c.)
7. Dominique Harize
8. Jean-François Imbernon
9. Alain Paco
10. Michel Palmie
11. Robert Paparemborde
12. Jean-Pierre Rives
13. Jean-Pierre Romeu
14. François Sangalli
15. Jean-Claude Skrela
- France used the same 15 players during the competition

== Ireland ==
Head coach: Roly Meates

1. Stephen Blake-Knox
2. Jimmy Bowen
3. Ned Byrne
4. Shay Deering
5. Willie Duggan
6. Tony Ensor
7. Thomas Feighery
8. Ray Finn
9. Brendan Foley
10. Mike Gibson
11. Tom Grace (c.)
12. Ronnie Hakin
13. Moss Keane
14. Robbie McGrath
15. Ian McIlrath
16. Alistair McKibbin
17. Stewart McKinney
18. Freddie McLennan
19. Charles Murtagh
20. Phil Orr
21. Michael Quinn
22. John Robbie
23. Fergus Slattery
24. Harold Steele
25. Pa Whelan
26. Frank Wilson

== Scotland ==
Head coach: Bill Dickinson

1. Jim Aitken
2. Ian Barnes
3. Mike Biggar
4. Alex Brewster
5. Sandy Carmichael
6. Alastair Cranston
7. Lewis Dick
8. Bill Gammell
9. Andy Irvine
10. Wilson Lauder
11. Alan Lawson
12. Don MacDonald
13. Duncan Madsen
14. Ian McGeechan (c.)
15. Alastair McHarg
16. Doug Morgan
17. Norman Pender
18. Jim Renwick
19. David Shedden
20. Billy Steele
21. Alan Tomes
22. Bill Watson
23. Ron Wilson

== Wales ==
Head coach: John Dawes

1. Phil Bennett (c.)
2. Clive Burgess
3. David Burcher
4. Terry Cobner
5. Gerald Davies
6. Gareth Edwards
7. Gareth Evans
8. Trefor Evans
9. Steve Fenwick
10. Allan Martin
11. Graham Price
12. Derek Quinnell
13. Glyn Shaw
14. Jeff Squire
15. Geoff Wheel
16. Clive Williams
17. J. J. Williams
18. J. P. R. Williams
19. Bobby Windsor
