= 1978 Five Nations Championship squads =

Rugby union competition squads

== England ==
Head coach: Peter Colston

1. Bill Beaumont (c.)
2. Mike Burton
3. David Caplan
4. Maurice Colclough
5. Barrie Corless
6. Fran Cotton
7. Robin Cowling
8. Peter Dixon
9. Paul Dodge
10. Dusty Hare
11. Alastair Hignell
12. Nigel Horton
13. Charles Kent
14. Andy Maxwell
15. Bob Mordell
16. Tony Neary
17. Barry Nelmes
18. Alan Old
19. Mike Rafter
20. John Scott
21. Mike Slemen
22. Peter Squires
23. Peter Wheeler
24. Malcolm Young

== France ==
Head coach: Jean Desclaux

1. Jean-Michel Aguirre
2. Jean-Luc Averous
3. Jean-Pierre Bastiat (c.)
4. Christian Bélascain
5. Roland Bertranne
6. Louis Bilbao
7. Daniel Bustaffa
8. Gérard Cholley
9. Jérôme Gallion
10. Jean-François Gourdon
11. Francis Haget
12. Jean-François Imbernon
13. Guy Noves
14. Alain Paco
15. Michel Palmie
16. Robert Paparemborde
17. Jean-Pierre Rives
18. Jean-Claude Skrela
19. Bernard Vivies

== Ireland ==
Head coach: Noel Murphy

1. Ned Byrne
2. Willie Duggan
3. Tony Ensor
4. Mick Fitzpatrick
5. Mike Gibson
6. Tom Grace
7. Moss Keane
8. Alistair McKibbin
9. Stewart McKinney
10. Freddie McLennan
11. Paul McNaughton
12. John Moloney (c.)
13. Lawrence Moloney
14. John O'Driscoll
15. Phil Orr
16. Fergus Slattery
17. Donal Spring
18. Harold Steele
19. Tony Ward
20. Pa Whelan

== Scotland ==
Head coach: Nairn McEwan

1. Mike Biggar
2. Richard Breakey
3. Sandy Carmichael
4. Alastair Cranston
5. Colin Deans
6. Bill Gammell
7. David Gray
8. Bruce Hay
9. Brian Hegarty
10. Graham Hogg
11. Andy Irvine
12. Don Macdonald
13. George Mackie
14. Duncan Madsen
15. Ian McGeechan
16. Alastair McHarg
17. Ian McLauchlan
18. Doug Morgan (c.)
19. Norman Pender
20. Jim Renwick
21. David Shedden
22. Alan Tomes
23. Ron Wilson

== Wales ==
Head coach: John Dawes

1. Phil Bennett (c.)
2. Terry Cobner
3. Gerald Davies
4. Gareth Edwards
5. Charlie Faulkner
6. Steve Fenwick
7. Ray Gravell
8. Allan Martin
9. Graham Price
10. Derek Quinnell
11. Jeff Squire
12. Geoff Wheel
13. J. J. Williams
14. J. P. R. Williams
15. Bobby Windsor
- Wales used the same 15 players during the competition
