= 1981 Five Nations Championship squads =

Rugby union competition squads

== England ==
Head coach: Mike Davis

1. Bill Beaumont (c.)
2. Phil Blakeway
3. John Carleton
4. Maurice Colclough
5. David Cooke
6. Fran Cotton
7. Huw Davies
8. Paul Dodge
9. Dusty Hare
10. Bob Hesford
11. John Horton
12. Nick Jeavons
13. Mike Rafter
14. Marcus Rose
15. Gordon Sargent
16. John Scott
17. Austin Sheppard
18. Mike Slemen
19. Colin Smart
20. Steve Smith
21. Peter Wheeler
22. Clive Woodward

== France ==
Head coach: Jacques Fouroux

1. Pierre Berbizier
2. Roland Bertranne
3. Serge Blanco
4. Alain Caussade
5. Manuel Carpentier
6. Didier Codorniou
7. Philippe Dintrans
8. Pierre Dospital
9. Serge Gabernet
10. Jean-François Imbernon
11. Jean-Luc Joinel
12. Pierre Lacans
13. Yves Lafarge
14. Guy Laporte
15. Patrick Mesny
16. Robert Paparemborde
17. Laurent Pardo
18. Daniel Revailler
19. Jean-Pierre Rives (c.)
20. Bernard Vivies

== Ireland ==
Head coach: Tom Kiernan

1. Ollie Campbell
2. John Cantrell
3. Willie Duggan
4. Mick Fitzpatrick
5. Brendan Foley
6. Michael Gibson
7. Kenneth Hooks
8. David Irwin
9. Moss Keane
10. Hugo MacNeill
11. Freddie McLennan
12. Paul McNaughton
13. John O'Driscoll
14. Phil Orr
15. Francis Quinn
16. John Robbie
17. Fergus Slattery (c.)
18. Donal Spring
19. Tony Ward
20. Pa Whelan

== Scotland ==
Head coach: Jim Telfer

1. Jim Aitken
2. John Beattie
3. Jim Calder
4. Bill Cuthbertson
5. Colin Deans
6. Gordon Dickson
7. David Gray
8. Bruce Hay
9. Andy Irvine (c.)
10. Roy Laidlaw
11. David Leslie
12. Steve Munro
13. Jim Renwick
14. Keith Robertson
15. Norrie Rowan
16. John Rutherford
17. Alan Tomes

== Wales ==
Head coach: John Lloyd

1. Rob Ackerman
2. Clive Burgess
3. Gareth Davies
4. Clive Davis
5. Alun Donovan
6. Gwyn Evans
7. Steve Fenwick (c.)*
8. Ray Gravell
9. Rhodri Lewis
10. Allan Martin
11. Peter Morgan
12. Dai Nicholas
13. Gary Pearce
14. Alan Phillips
15. Graham Price
16. Clive Rees
17. David Richards
18. Jeff Squire (c.)**
19. Ian Stephens
20. Geoff Wheel
21. Brynmor Williams
22. Gareth Williams
23. Gerald Williams
24. J. P. R. Williams
- captain in the first two games
  - captain in the last two games
