= 1976 Ireland rugby union tour of New Zealand and Fiji =

Summary
| P | W | D | L |
Total
| 8 | 5 | 0 | 3 |
Test match
| 2 | 1 | 0 | 1 |
Opponent
| P | W | D | L |
New Zealand
| 1 | 0 | 0 | 1 |
Fiji
| 1 | 1 | 0 | 0 |

Tour chronology
- ← Argentina 1970 Australia 1979 →

1976 Ireland rugby union tour of New Zealand and Fiji. The Ireland national rugby union team toured New Zealand and Fiji for the first time in 1976. Although Ireland had first played the All Blacks in 1905, this tour saw Ireland play them away for the first time. However, the tour is probably best remembered for the final game against Fiji. A tired Ireland team arrived in Fiji only to discover that, as a result of a scheduling mistake, the senior Fiji team were actually on tour in Australia. The Fiji Rugby Union managed to bring together a small group of first-team players and stand-ins. The official attendance was 12,000, but Fijian newspapers reported closer to 17,000, with many locals packed into tight surroundings. The try-line was exceptionally close to the deadball-line, with Tony Ensor at one point running over both the try-line and deadball-line. As well as playing in extremely hot weather, the teams also had to deal with a pitch invasion by dozens of frogs. Despite Ireland's inexperience with such conditions, they ran out winners, 0–8. Mike Gibson, Willie Duggan, Philip Orr and Moss Keane all returned to New Zealand with the British Lions for their 1977 tour.

== Matches ==
Scores and results list Ireland's points tally first.

| Opposing Team | For | Against | Date | Venue |
|---|---|---|---|---|
| South Canterbury | 19 | 4 | 15 May | Fraser Park, Timaru |
| North Auckland | 12 | 3 | 19 May | Okara Park, Whangārei |
| Auckland | 10 | 13 | 22 May | Eden Park, Auckland |
| Manawatu | 22 | 16 | 26 May | The Showgrounds Oval, Palmerston North |
| Canterbury | 4 | 18 | 29 May | Lancaster Park, Christchurch |
| Southland | 18 | 3 | 1 June | Rugby Park, Invercargill |
| New Zealand | 3 | 11 | 5 June | Athletic Park, Wellington |
| Fiji | 8 | 0 | 9 June | Buckhurst Park, Suva |

== Touring party ==
- Manager: K. Quilligan
- Assistant Manager: Roly Meates
- Medical Officer: T.C.J. O’Connell
- Captain: Tom Grace

=== Backs ===
- Joseph Brady (Wanderers)
- Donal Canniffe (Lansdowne)
- Tony Ensor (Wanderers)
- Mike Gibson (NIFC)
- Tom Grace (University College Dublin)
- Ian McIlrath (Ballymena)
- Barry McGann (Cork Constitution)
- Robbie McGrath (Wanderers)
- Wallace McMaster (Ballymena)
- Larry Moloney (Garryowen)
- Mick Quinn (Lansdowne)
- John Robbie (Dublin University)

=== Forwards ===
- John Cantrell (University College Dublin)
- Roger Clegg (Bangor)
- Jim Davidson (Dungannon)
- Shay Deering (Garryowen)
- Willie Duggan (Blackrock College)
- Tom Feighery (St Mary's College)
- Brendan Foley (Shannon)
- Ronnie Hakin (CIYMS)
- Stewart McKinney (Dungannon)
- Moss Keane (Lansdowne)
- Philip Orr (Old Wesley)
- Phil O'Callaghan (Dolphin)
- Emmet O'Rafferty (Wanderers)
- Harry Steele (Ballymena)
- Pat Whelan (Garryowen)

== See also ==
- History of rugby union matches between All Blacks and Ireland
