= 1979 Ireland rugby union tour of Australia =

Summary
P	W	D	L
Total
8	7	0	1
Test match
2	2	0	0
Opponent
P	W	D	L
Australia
2	2	0	0

Tour chronology
- ← New Zealand & Fiji 1976 South Africa 1981 →

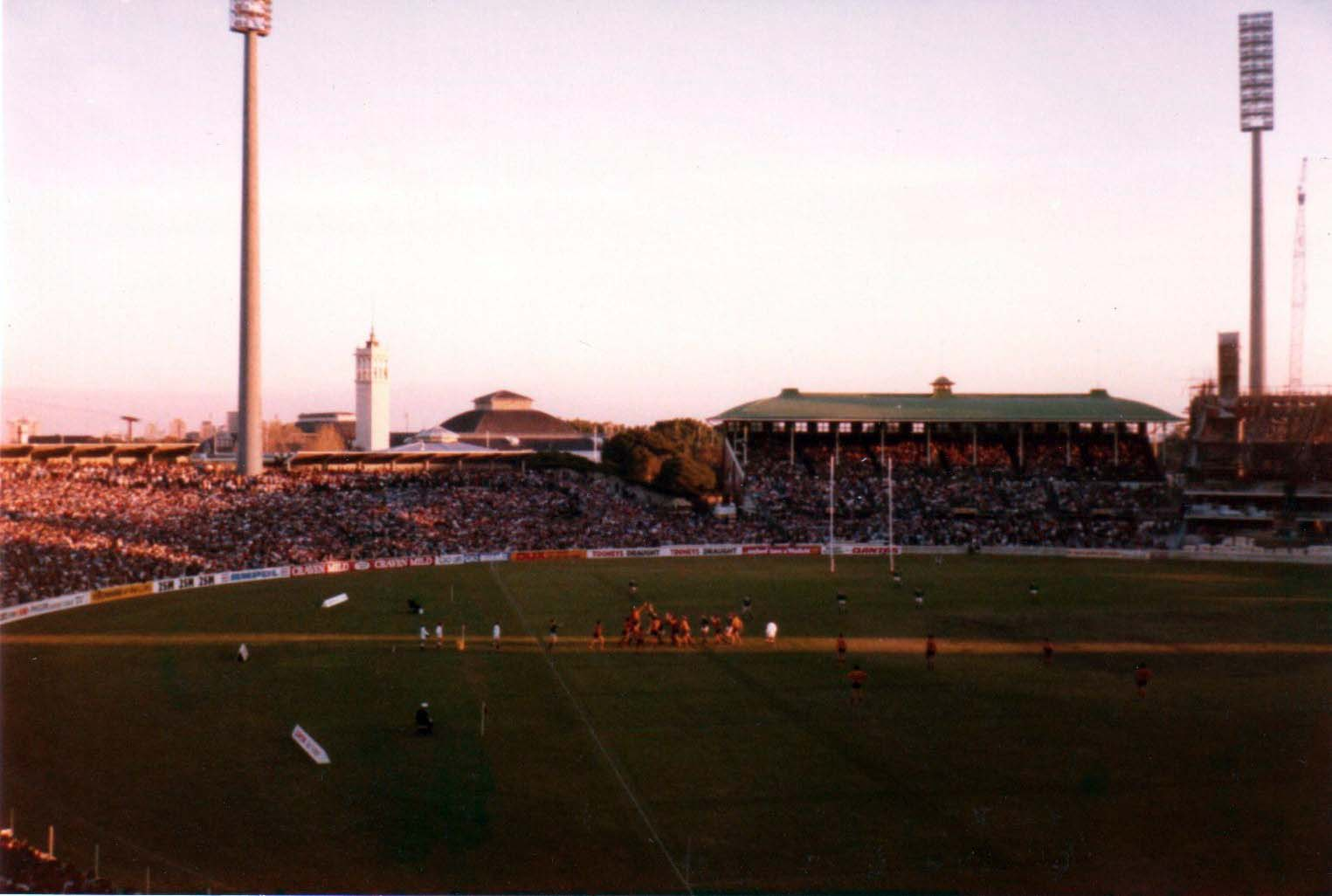
Ireland line-out, second Test

The 1979 Ireland rugby union tour of Australia was a series of eight matches played by the Ireland national rugby union team in Australia in May and June 1979.

The tour was one of Ireland's most successful to date. Ireland won seven of the eight matches they played, including both tests against Australia. The only defeat came against Sydney. The tour also marked a notable episode in the rivalry between the two Ireland fly halves, Tony Ward and Ollie Campbell. Ward had been an ever present during both the 1978 and 1979 Five Nations Championships and he also played in the early games during this tour. However he was then dropped before the first test in favour of Campbell. Campbell subsequently emerged as man of the tour, setting an Irish record when he scored 60 points during the remaining games. On 3 June in Brisbane he scored 19 points, helping Ireland to a 27–12 victory. Campbell scored four penalties, one drop goal and converted two Colin Patterson tries. In the second test on 16 June Campbell scored two drop goals and a penalty as Ireland won 9–3. These two tests also marked the beginning and the end of the careers of two Ireland rugby legends. The first test saw the debut of Ciaran Fitzgerald while the second saw Mike Gibson make his final Ireland appearance. While on this tour Ned Byrne was the victim of a hit and run road accident which left his leg broken in three places.

== Matches ==
Scores and results list Ireland's points tally first.

Opposing Team	For	Against	Date	Venue
Western Australia	39	3	20 May	Perry Lakes Stadium, Perth
Australian Capital Territory	35	7	23 May	Manuka Oval, Canberra
New South Wales	16	12	26 May	Sydney Sports Ground, Sydney
Queensland	18	15	29 May	Ballymore, Brisbane
Australia	27	12	3 June	Ballymore, Brisbane
New South Wales Country	28	7	5 June	Wade Park, Orange
Sydney	12	16	9 June	Sydney Sports Ground, Sydney
Australia	9	3	16 June	Sydney Cricket Ground, Sydney

== Test matches ==
3 June 1979

Australia	12–27	Ireland
Tries: Brendan Moon; Con: Paul McLean; Pen: Paul McLean (2)		Tries: Colin Patterson (2); Con: Ollie Campbell (2); Pen: Ollie Campbell (4); Drop Goal: Ollie Campbell

Ballymore, Brisbane
Attendance: 16,500
Referee: R G Byres (Australia)

16 June 1979

Australia	3–9	Ireland
Tries: Con: Pen: Paul McLean		Pen: Ollie Campbell; Drop Goals: Ollie Campbell (2)

SCG, Sydney
Attendance: 33,476
Referee: R. G. Byres (Australia)

== Touring party ==
- Manager: J. Coffey
- Assistant Manager: Noel Murphy
- Medical Officer: T.C.J. O’Connell
- Captain: Fergus Slattery

=== Backs ===
- Paul Andreucetti (St Mary's College)
- Ollie Campbell (Old Belvedere)
- Frank Ennis (Wanderers)
- Mike Gibson (NIFC)
- David Irwin (Queen's University)
- Terry Kennedy (St Mary's College)
- Freddie McLennan (Wanderers)
- Paul McNaughton (Greystones)
- John Moloney (St Mary's College)
- Rodney O'Donnell (St Mary's College)
- Colin Patterson (Instonians)
- Tony Ward (Garryowen)

=== Forwards ===
- Ned Byrne (Blackrock College)
- Christy Cantillon (Cork Constitution)
- Willie Duggan (Blackrock College)
- Ciaran Fitzgerald (St Mary's College)
- Mick Fitzpatrick (Wanderers)
- Brendan Foley (Shannon)
- Moss Keane (Lansdowne)
- Alan McLean (Ballymena)
- Gerry McLoughlin (Shannon)
- John O'Driscoll (London Irish)
- Philip Orr (Old Wesley)
- Fergus Slattery (Blackrock College)
- Harry Steele (Ballymena)
- Pat Whelan (Garryowen)

== See also ==
- History of rugby union matches between Australia and Ireland
