= Dunboyne =

Town near Dublin, Ireland

Dunboyne Dún Búinne (Irish)
- Town
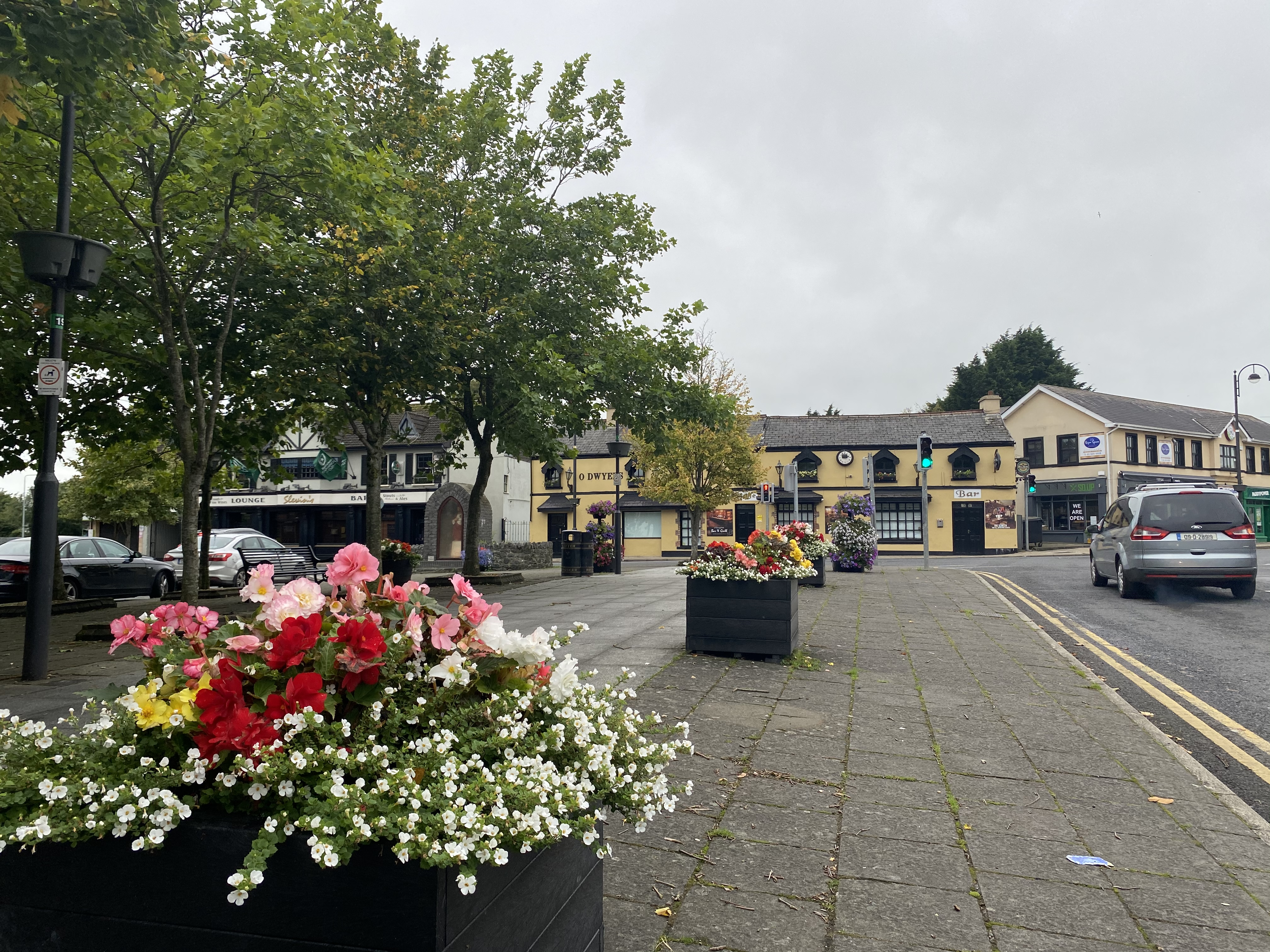
- Town centre, 2020

- Location in Greater Dublin Dunboyne (Ireland)
- Coordinates: 53.420°N 6.475°W
- Country: Ireland
- Province: Leinster
- County: Meath
- Elevation: 70 m (230 ft)

Population (2022)
  - Total: 7,155
- Time zone: UTC±0 (WET)
  - Summer (DST): UTC+1 (IST)
- Eircode routing key: A86
- Telephone area code: +353(0)1
- Irish Grid Reference: O010422

Dunboyne (Irish: Dún Búinne, meaning 'Búinne's stronghold') is a town in County Meath, Ireland, 15 km (9 mi) north-west of Dublin city centre. It is a commuter town for Dublin. In the 20 years between the 1996 and 2016 censuses, the population of Dunboyne more than doubled from 3,080 to 7,272 inhabitants. As per the 2022 census, the population decreased slightly to 7,155. The town is in a townland and civil parish of the same name.

== Location ==
Dunboyne is centred on the crossroads formed by the R156 regional road and the old Maynooth Road (formerly designated R157).

== History ==
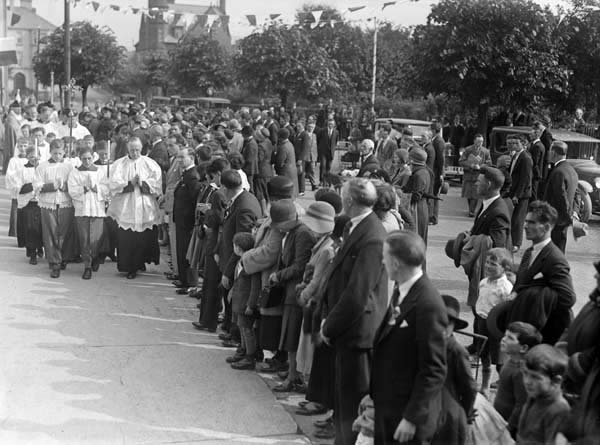
Procession through the streets of Kilbride, in 1931, marking the consecration of a new chapel of ease in the parish

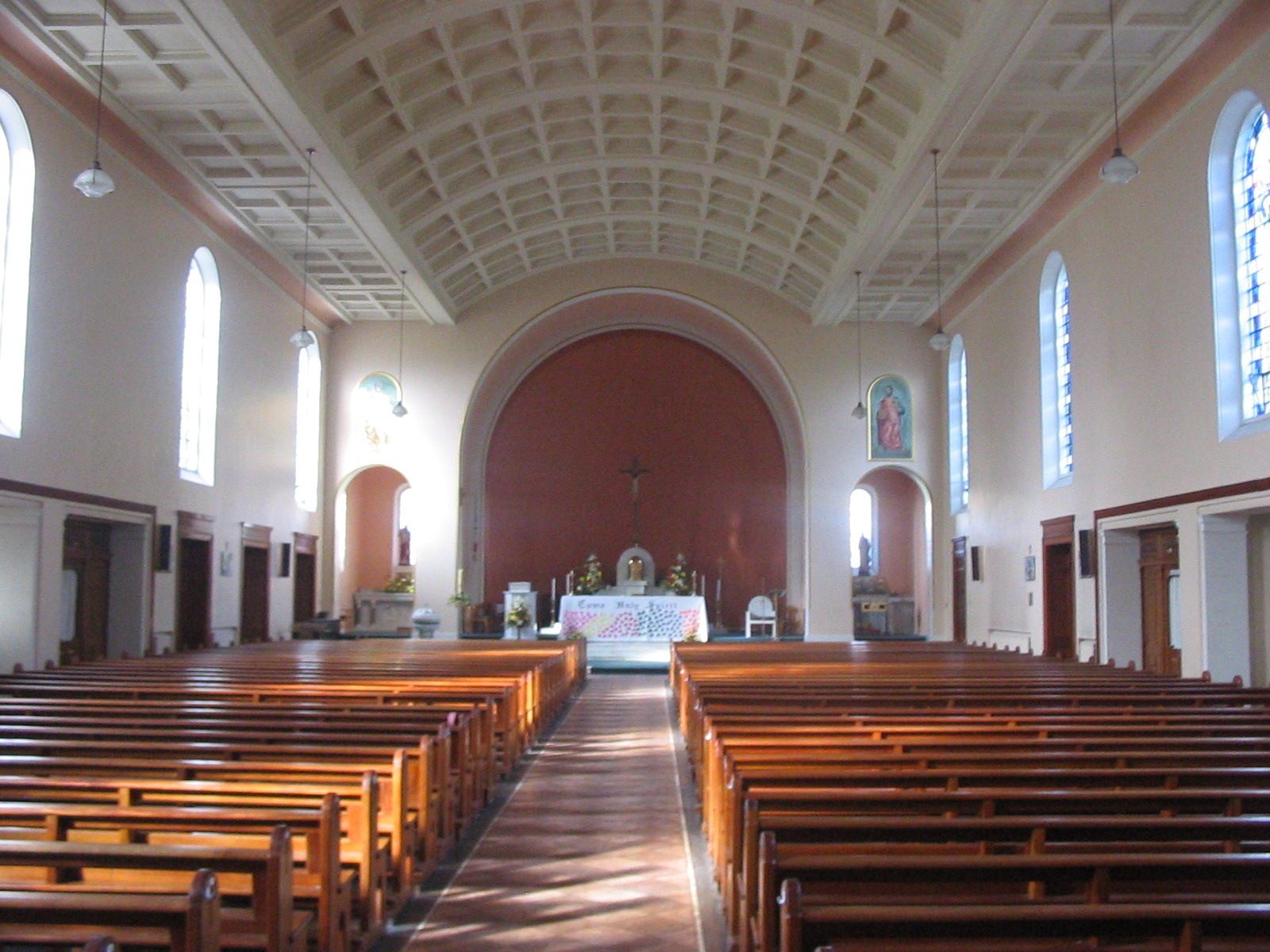
The Catholic Church of Saints Peter & Paul was built in 1959

Dunboyne's Irish language name, Dún Búinne, indicates it was the fort of Bui who was the wife of the god Lugh. Dunboyne was home to many men who fought for and against British rule in the Irish Rebellion of 1798. During the War of Independence the town was Division Headquarters to the IRA (Irish Republican Army) 1st Eastern Division, a unit formed in April 1921 under Divisional commander, Seán Boylan. The Division consisted nine brigades: 1st Brigade (south Meath & north Kildare); 2nd (Navan & Trim); 3rd (Kells, Virginia & Mullagh); 4th, Delvin; 5th (Mullingar & north Westmeath); 6th, Edenderry; 7th (Naas & south Kildare); 8th Fingal; and 9th (Drogheda & south Louth). Dunboyne got its name from Boann, the goddess of the River Boyne. The River Tolka runs through Dunboyne.

=== Dunboyne Castle ===
Dunboyne Castle, originally a tower house, was built as a seat for a branch of the Butler dynasty, the Lords Dunboyne. This tower house was destroyed during the Cromwellian invasion of Ireland, and a Georgian country house was built on the property in the mid-18th century.

Later passing to the Mangan family, the country house was the seat of Simon Mangan, HM Lieutenant for County Meath in the 1890s and 1900s. The house was sold in 1950 and became a convent, in which nuns lived and operated a mother and baby institution. The Árd Mhuire Mother and Baby Home in Dunboyne, which was opened by the Sisters of the Good Shepherd in 1955, closed in 1991. A partial section of the building was dismantled. The convent was sold and converted into a hotel which opened in 2006.

== Sport ==
=== Athletics ===
Dunboyne Athletic Club was founded in 1928 and is located on the Rooske Road. The club's facilities include throwing facilities, a clubhouse and a 400-metre all-weather track which opened in 2019.

=== Gaelic games ===
The local Gaelic Athletic Association (GAA) team, St Peters Dunboyne GAA, won the Meath Senior Football Championship in 1998, 2005 and 2018. Dunboyne man Seán Boylan managed the Meath senior football team to All Ireland victories in 1987, 1988, 1996 and 1999.

Dunboyne's Ladies Gaelic football team, Dunboyne Ladies GFC, was founded in 1996. The team has won several titles, and won the Leinster Ladies' Senior Club Football Championship in 2021.

=== Motor racing ===
Dunboyne was a motor racing venue between 1958 and 1967 for both cars and motorbikes. The racing circuit was a 4 mile long triangular shaped circuit with a combination of fast straights and hairpin bends. The start/finish line was in the centre of Dunboyne village and the racing circuit itself consisted of public roads around the village. During the late 1950s and 1960s, races such as the Leinster Trophy, Dunboyne Trophy and Holmpatrick Trophy were held.

=== Football ===
Dunboyne has two association football clubs, Dunboyne FC and Dunboyne AFC. Dunboyne AFC's grounds are on the Summerhill Road which has a floodlit astro turf pitch, three 11 a-side pitches, two small-sided pitches, club shop, and clubhouse. Dunboyne FC plays in the Phoenix Park. Dunboyne A.F.C was officially opened by Pele in November 2009 in recognition of the club receiving the FAI Club of the Year award for 2009.

=== Other sports ===
The GUI National Golf Academy is located 5 km outside Dunboyne on the Maynooth Road. It has a driving range, putting green and short game area. There is also a golf society in Dunboyne.

Two Irish rugby internationals from the area, brothers Tom and Conleth Feighery, received a number of international caps in the 1970s.

== Education ==
=== Primary schools ===
Primary schools serving the area include Dunboyne Junior Primary School, Dunboyne Senior Primary School, Gaelscoil Thulach na nÓg and St Peter's National School (Church of Ireland).

In 2002 the headmaster at Gaelscoil Thulach na nÓg was dismissed by the board of patrons for writing a letter to the parents of the children which was deemed by the Board of Management to be misconduct. The parents of the school were divided on the issue, with some reportedly believing that the incident was unfairly represented in the press.

=== Post-primary ===
The local secondary school is St. Peter's College.

Dunboyne College of Further Education, located in Dunboyne Business Park, provides full-time courses at FETAC level 5. It is for PLC. The college operates under the authority of the County Meath Vocational Education Committee. As of 2016, 38 post-leaving certificate courses were offered by the college.

== Amenities ==
Pubs in Dunboyne

Following a public meeting in 1985, fundraising commenced for a social and recreational centre in Dunboyne. Over £400,000 was raised and the Irish government contributed grants totalling £35,000. A community centre was opened by then-President of Ireland, Dr Patrick Hillery, in 1989. With the establishment of St Peter's College on the adjoining site in 1994, the opportunity arose to undertake a venture which later became a model for school/community ventures elsewhere in Ireland. The money that would have been spent on putting sports facilities into the college, £280,000, was instead invested in the centre. Through further fundraising, the committee added another £150,000 to this and the result was a major extension of the building in 1997. This arrangement provided the college with a larger sports hall than it otherwise would have had while, outside of school hours, the extension enabled the centre to cater to the growing community. Health and fitness facilities were added in 2000 and a floodlit all-weather pitch (another joint venture with St Peter's College) was developed in 2003.

== Transport ==
=== Road ===
Dunboyne is situated primarily on the Station Road (L2228) Regional Road, at the intersection of the Maynooth Road (L2227) The town also lies parallel with the M3 motorway, which connects to L2228 using the R157 at a roundabout west of the town.

=== Rail ===
There are two rail stations in Dunboyne. Dunboyne railway station, which was built to service the town and is situated to the east of the town and M3 Parkway railway station which was built to service commuters using the M3 coming down from Navan. They were built as part of the reopening of the Navan-Clonsilla line under the Irish Governments Transport 21 development programme. However, due to a lack of funding, this railway stops after the M3 Parkway railway station just outside of Dunboyne. The original Dunboyne railway station was opened on 29 August 1862 and closed on 1 April 1963.

=== Bus ===
Dunboyne is served by three bus routes: the 70 and 70d (operated by Dublin Bus) and 270 (operated by Go-Ahead Ireland). There is also a limited Bus Éireann service to/from Dunshaughlin, Navan and Kells on route 109 and to Mullingar, Killucan, Rathmolyon and Summerhill on route 118.

Bus Éireann route 109 provides two journeys a day in the morning to Kells via Dunshaughlin and Navan and two return journeys in the evening. No Bus Éireann services serve Dunboyne on Sundays. Bus Éireann route 111 between Dublin and Athboy stops at the M3 parkway station, outside Dunboyne.

== Geography ==
The Castle River flows into the Tolka River and flooding in and around Dunboyne has been attributed to problems further down the Tolka. Alleviation works have resulted in the risk of flooding being lessened. The last major flood was in 2002, preceded by a flood in 2000.

On 11 May 2007, the town was hit by a small tornado in which slates were torn from roofs and branches from trees during a brief storm.

== In media ==
The 1970s television series, The Riordans, set in the fictional townland of Leestown, was filmed in Dunboyne.

The 2025 single When a Good Man Cries, by Irish singer-songwriter CMAT, mentions the town in the lyric "The people's mess, Dunboyne Diana". The term "Dunboyne Diana" has been used to refer to the singer, and included on merchandise.

== People ==
- Thomas Blood (1618–1680), an Irish colonel best known for attempting to steal the Crown Jewels of England in 1671
- Seán Boylan, former manager of the Meath GAA football team and the Irish International Rules team lives in Dunboyne
- John Bruton, former Taoiseach leader of Fine Gael, lived most of his life in the area
- John Butler, 12th Baron Dunboyne, inherited the title of Baron Dunboyne in 1785
- Thomas Cusack, a Lord Chancellor of Ireland in the 1500s
- Dermot Farrell, Archbishop of Dublin, was formerly the parish priest to Dunboyne
- Virginia Kerr, Irish operatic soprano, is from the area
- Darragh Lenihan, association footballer who has played for Middlesbrough and Blackburn Rovers
- Niall Quinn, a British Formula 3 driver and rookie driver for A1 Team Ireland was born in Dunboyne
- Brian Smyth, Meath's first All-Ireland Football winning captain in 1949, resided in Dunboyne.
- CMAT, singer-songwriter and musician, and winner of the 2022 Choice Music Prize, lived in Dunboyne as an adolescent

== See also ==
- List of towns and villages in Ireland
