= Eileen Flynn =

Eileen Flynn may refer to:

- Eileen Flynn (1955–2008), Irish schoolteacher in the Eileen Flynn case
- Eileen Flynn (politician) (born 1989/1990), Irish senator
