= Frank Ennis =

Irish rugby union player

- Full name: Francis Noel Gerard Ennis
- Born: 24 December 1955 (age 70) Dublin, Ireland

Rugby union career
- Position: Fullback / Winger
International career
Years	Team	Apps	(Points)
1979	Ireland	1	(0)

Francis Noel Gerard Ennis (born 24 December 1955) is an Irish former rugby union international.

Ennis was born in Dublin and attended St Paul's College, Raheny.

Capped once for Ireland, Ennis featured on the successful 1979 tour of Australia, coming off the bench in the 1st Test at Ballymore Stadium in Brisbane to replace Rodney O'Donnell at fullback. He was a Leinster provincial representative and played for Dublin club Wanderers, before retiring from senior rugby in 1988.

== See also ==
- List of Ireland national rugby union players
