= Stranmillis University College =

College of Queen's University Belfast

- Motto: Docendo discimus
- Motto in English: We learn by teaching
- Established: 1922
- Affiliations: Queen's University Belfast
- Principal: Prof. Jonathan Heggarty MBE
- Students: 1,430 (2024/25)
- Undergraduates: 1,055 (2024/25)
- Postgraduates: 375 (2024/25)
- Location: Stranmillis Road; Belfast; BT9 5DY, Belfast, Northern Ireland; 54.573°N 5.937°W
- Nickname: Stran
- Website: http://www.stran.ac.uk

Stranmillis University College is a university college of Queen's University Belfast. The institution is located on the Stranmillis Road in Belfast. It had 1,430 students in 2024/25. The school offers the BEd, PGCE and TESOL, as well as other courses.

== History ==
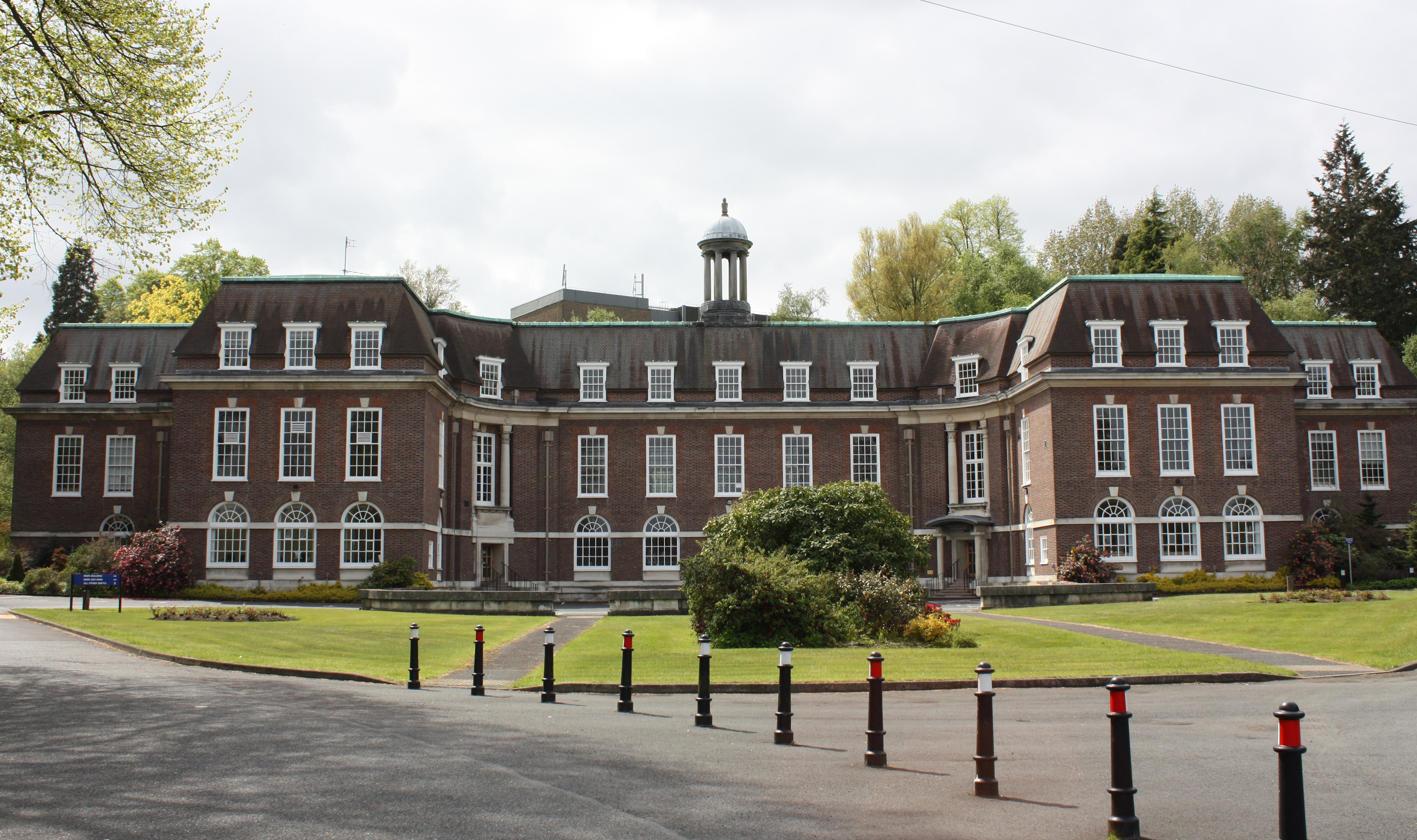
Stranmillis University College

The college was established in 1922 to provide state-funded teacher training by the then newly created Government of Northern Ireland to ensure that there would be a non-denominational teacher training college within Northern Ireland's boundaries after the partition of Ireland. This status was undermined early in its existence, after a statement by Catholic bishops to the effect that a graduate of the institution would not be allowed to teach in a Catholic school. While Stranmillis remained the principal provider of teachers to state schools, in latter years, students could pay privately to complete their certificate in Catholic education. Throughout its existence, Stranmillis has been welcoming of people from all faith backgrounds. During the Second World War it was taken over by a military hospital from 1939 until May 1944 when the hospital relocated to Portrush, County Antrim.

== Architecture ==
The main building of the college is attributed to Roland Ingleby Smith, chief architect of the Northern Ireland Ministry of Finance at the time of its construction in 1928-1930. The design, however, may have been partly or even wholly the work of an architect in the Government of Northern Ireland Works Division, T. F. O. Rippingham.

T. F. O. Rippingham is directly credited with the design of other college buildings, especially the Henry Garrett Building (1944).

== Association with Queen's University Belfast ==
The university college has been associated with Queen's University since 1968 when it became a college of the university and commenced offering the university's degrees. In 1999 this status was upgraded to the current university college status. The university college is financially and organisationally independent of the university.

== Students' Union ==
Stranmillis Students' Union is the SU for Stranmillis University College Belfast, a College of Queen's University, Belfast. The union is a democratic organisation which aims to ensure that every student has the highest quality of education and the most enjoyable student experience during their time at University. They offer academic representation, advice and a range of clubs and societies, as well as opportunities for volunteering and fundraising for charities. Every student that attends Stranmillis is a member of the Students' Union.

The Students' Union is run by a body of ten students (as of 2022) known as the Students' Union Executive (SU Exec) and consists of the President, Deputy President, Secretary, International Secretary, Welfare Secretary, Entertainment Secretary, Clubs & Societies Secretary, Academic Secretary, Services Secretary and Publicity Secretary. The President is the leader of the Executive and is responsible for the life of all students on campus. The Executive are all elected into their roles by an anonymous vote from the student body. The President is an annually-changing role, where they are elected in their last year of study, completing their year in office as a Graduate student. The President is the only member of the Executive who is an 'employee' of the Union, with the other nine members in part-time, voluntary roles which they complete alongside their academic studies.

== Belfast School of Theology ==
In 2024, the Belfast School of Theology (formerly the Belfast Bible College) moved their premises to Stranmillis College.

== Notable alumni ==
- Willie Anderson; former Ireland rugby union international
- Jonny Bell; former Ireland rugby union international
- Ronnie Hakin; former Ireland rugby international
- Billy Johnston; former Northern Ireland football (soccer) international
- Ronnie Lamont MBE; former Ireland rugby international and British & Irish Lion 1966
- Ken Maginnis; former MP for Fermanagh and South Tyrone
- Ian McIlrath; former Ireland rugby union international; President of the Irish Rugby Football Union 2018-19
- Bridget McKeever; former Ireland women's field hockey international
- Stewart McKinney; former Ireland rugby union international and British & Irish Lion 1974
- Stephen O'Neill; former Tyrone Gaelic footballer
- Graham Reid; playwright
- Sammy Wilson; MP for East Antrim

== See also ==
- Education in Northern Ireland
- List of universities in Northern Ireland
