= Brian Baird (newsreader) =

Newsreader (1929–1998)

Brian Baird (1929–1998) was a newsreader that worked for the Northern Ireland television channel UTV during the 1970s and well into the 1980s, and a teacher and lecturer at Stranmillis Teacher Training College. He also worked for a time for the BBC Radio in Belfast, and was a past president of the Ulster Society of Rugby Football Referees.

Belfast-born Brian Baird started his career as a teacher in Methodist College Belfast, before relocating with his wife in 1956 to teach English at Malay College in Kuala Kangsar, a small town in Malaysia, after answering a newspaper advertisement seeking Education Officers for teaching work abroad. The position he filled had recently been vacated by author Anthony Burgess. Five years later, he moved with his wife Stella and son Stephen to the island of Penang, where his son Patric Baird was born, before returning to Belfast in 1963. Then, for many years, he was the face and the voice of the Ulster Television news report. He died in 1998 after a long illness.
