= Harry McKibbin Jr. =

Rugby union player from Northern Ireland

- Full name: Christopher Henry McKibbin
- Born: 24 June 1948 (age 78) Belfast, Northern Ireland
- Notable relative(s): Harry McKibbin (father); Des McKibbin (uncle); Alistair McKibbin (brother); Roger Wilson (nephew)

Rugby union career
- Position: Fullback / Wing
International career
Years	Team	Apps	(Points)
1976	Ireland	1	(0)

Christopher Henry McKibbin (born 24 June 1948) is an Irish former international rugby union player.

McKibbin was born in Belfast and is the eldest child of Ireland player and administrator Harry McKibbin.

An Instonians fullback, McKibbin won his solitary Ireland cap against Scotland in a 1976 Five Nations match at Lansdowne Road, coming on off the bench to substitute an injured Mike Gibson.

McKibbin's uncle Des McKibbin, brother Alistair McKibbin, and nephew Roger Wilson were also Ireland internationals.

== See also ==
- List of Ireland national rugby union players
