= Roger Wilson (rugby union, born 1981) =

Rugby union player from Northern Ireland

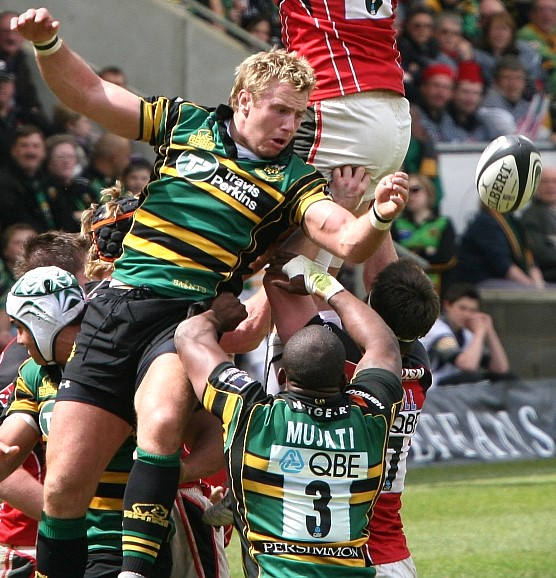
- Wilson line-out for Northampton Saints in 2010
- Born: 21 September 1981 (age 45) Belfast, Northern Ireland
- Height: 1.89 m (6 ft 2 in)
- Weight: 108 kg (17 st 0 lb)

Rugby union career
- Position: Number 8
Amateur team(s)
Years	Team	Apps	(Points)
2000–2002	Dublin University		
2002–2003	Belfast Harlequins		
2017-	Instonians		
Senior career
Years	Team	Apps	(Points)
2003–2008	Ulster	113	(55)
2008–2012	Northampton	117	(25)
2012–2017	Ulster	104	(15)
- Correct as of 18 Feb 2018
International career
Years	Team	Apps	(Points)
2005–2008	Ireland A	12	(5)
2005	Ireland	1	(0)
2014	Barbarians	1	(0)
2014	World XV	1	(0)
- Correct as of 09 Feb 2015

Roger Wilson (born 21 September 1981) is an Irish former rugby union player, who played at number eight for Ulster, Northampton Saints and Ireland. Since retiring in 2017, he has worked in the United States, coaching American football players in rugby tackling techniques.

== Career ==
=== Club ===
Despite a one-time interest in a football career, Wilson played school rugby at RBAI and was a member of the 1998 and 2000 schools cup winning teams. After being spotted during his time at Trinity College, following a third division game, Wilson signed his first professional contract with Ulster. He held down a regular starting spot in the Ulster XV after his debut in September 2003 against the Ospreys, aged 21, and claimed the Ulster Player of the Year Award for the 2003–04 and 2006-07 seasons. Wilson played every game for Ulster in the 2006–07 season and accumulated the most minutes on the pitch (1,591 minutes and 26 caps).

On 25 January 2008, Northampton Saints announced that he had signed to the club for the 2008–09 season. He became a regular starter and earned over 100 caps for the Saints, helping them win the 2008–09 European Challenge Cup and the 2009–10 LV Cup, and reach the final of the 2010–11 Heineken Cup. On 18 January 2012, Ulster confirmed that Wilson was to return to the province for the start of next season. He joined Ulster on a three-year deal. He retired at the end of 2016-17 season, having made more than 200 appearances for Ulster.

=== Representative ===
Wilson won his only Ireland cap in June 2005 during the tour to Japan. He was part of the Ireland A squad that participated in the Churchill Cup in the USA and Canada in June 2006. He was again selected for the Ireland A Churchill Cup Tour in June 2007. He was called up to the senior Ireland squad for the 2015 Six Nations Championship. Wilson has commented that he has been frustrated at not being able to play more for Ireland, however he is happy that he has been able to sustain a long career at the highest level of professional rugby.

In May 2014 he was called up to play for the Barbarians against an England XV and in the same month he was Ireland's only representative in a World XV which played in an exhibition game against South Africa.

=== Coaching ===
After retiring, Wilson became head coach of Instonians rugby club in Belfast in June 2017. He later moved to Dallas, Texas, initially working as a strength and conditioning coach at the Michael Johnson Performance Centre, before setting up Tacklesmart, a coaching company teaching rugby tackling techniques to American football players.

== Honours ==
Ulster Rugby

- Celtic Cup: Winners 2003
- Celtic League: Winners 2006

Northampton Saints

- European Rugby Challenge Cup: Winners 2009
- LV Cup: Winners 2010
- Heineken Cup: Runners-Up 2011

== Personal life ==
Wilson's grandfather, Harry McKibbin and his two uncles, Harry Jnr and Alistair, have also represented Ireland at rugby union. Wilson married his Brazilian girlfriend Nathalia Melo in June 2015.
