= Emmet O'Rafferty =

Irish rugby union player

- School: Castleknock College
- Occupation: Businessman

Rugby union career
- Position: Lock
International career
Years	Team	Apps	(Points)
1976	Ireland	1	

Emmet O'Rafferty is an Irish businessman and former international rugby union player.

O'Rafferty spent his early years in Canada, where his Arklow-born father had moved to practice medicine. He learned his rugby while attending Castleknock College in Dublin as a boarder.

A Wanderers and Leinster second-row forward, O'Rafferty earned an Ireland call up for the 1976 tour of New Zealand and Fiji. He didn't feature against the All Blacks, but played in their win over Fiji in Suva, for which the Irish Rugby Football Union retrospectively awarded him an Ireland cap in 2023.

O'Rafferty is the founder and chairman of Top Security.

== See also ==
- List of Ireland national rugby union players
