= Belfast School of Theology =

- Type: Private Religious College
- Established: 1943
- Affiliations: University of Cumbria
- Principal: James Burnett
- Location: Stranmillis College; Stranmillis Road; Belfast; BT9 5DY, Belfast, Northern Ireland; 54.573°N 5.937°W
- Website: bst.ac.uk

The Belfast School of Theology is a private theological and Christian training college in Belfast, Northern Ireland. The college was formerly named Belfast Bible College until 2024. The institution currently operates within the campus of Stranmillis University College, and offers courses in Christian theology, delivered in partnership with the University of Cumbria. The college is interdenominational, rather than being affiliated with a specific denomination.

== History ==
The college was established in 1943 as the Belfast Bible School and Missionary Training Home. It moved to Glenburn House in 1983. At the time, the college had 35 full-time students.

The college previously offered degrees conferred through a partnership with Queen's University Belfast. Following the ending of this partnership in 2019, degrees are now awarded in collaboration with the University of Cumbria.

In April 2024, the Belfast Bible College changed its name to become the Belfast School of Theology. In August 2025, the BST moved its operations from Glenburn House to the second floor of Stranmillis University College in South Belfast.

== Courses ==
Belfast School of Theology offers undergraduate and postgraduate programmes in partnership with the University of Cumbria. At the undergraduate level, the school provides a BA (Hons) in Theology, available full-time over three years or part-time over six years, as well as a Certificate in Theology that serves as an introductory qualification. At the postgraduate level, it offers a Graduate Certificate, Graduate Diploma, Postgraduate Certificate, Postgraduate Diploma, and an MA in Practical Theology. The MA is delivered online and part-time to accommodate students engaged in ministry and related professional contexts.

Entry requirements to undergraduate courses are typically two grades at 'C' or above at A-Level. Entry requirements for the Graduate Diploma are typically an undergraduate degree graded 2.2 or higher, or a professional qualification at the same level, as well as one year of active engagement in some form of Christian Ministry. Applicants to the MA Theology programme must typically achieve an undergraduate honours degree classed as 2.1 or above in any subject. They must also have "a reasonable amount of experience in serving in Christian Ministry." All courses can be studied both full- and part-time.
