= T. F. O. Rippingham =

English-born architect

Thomas Francis Ord Rippingham
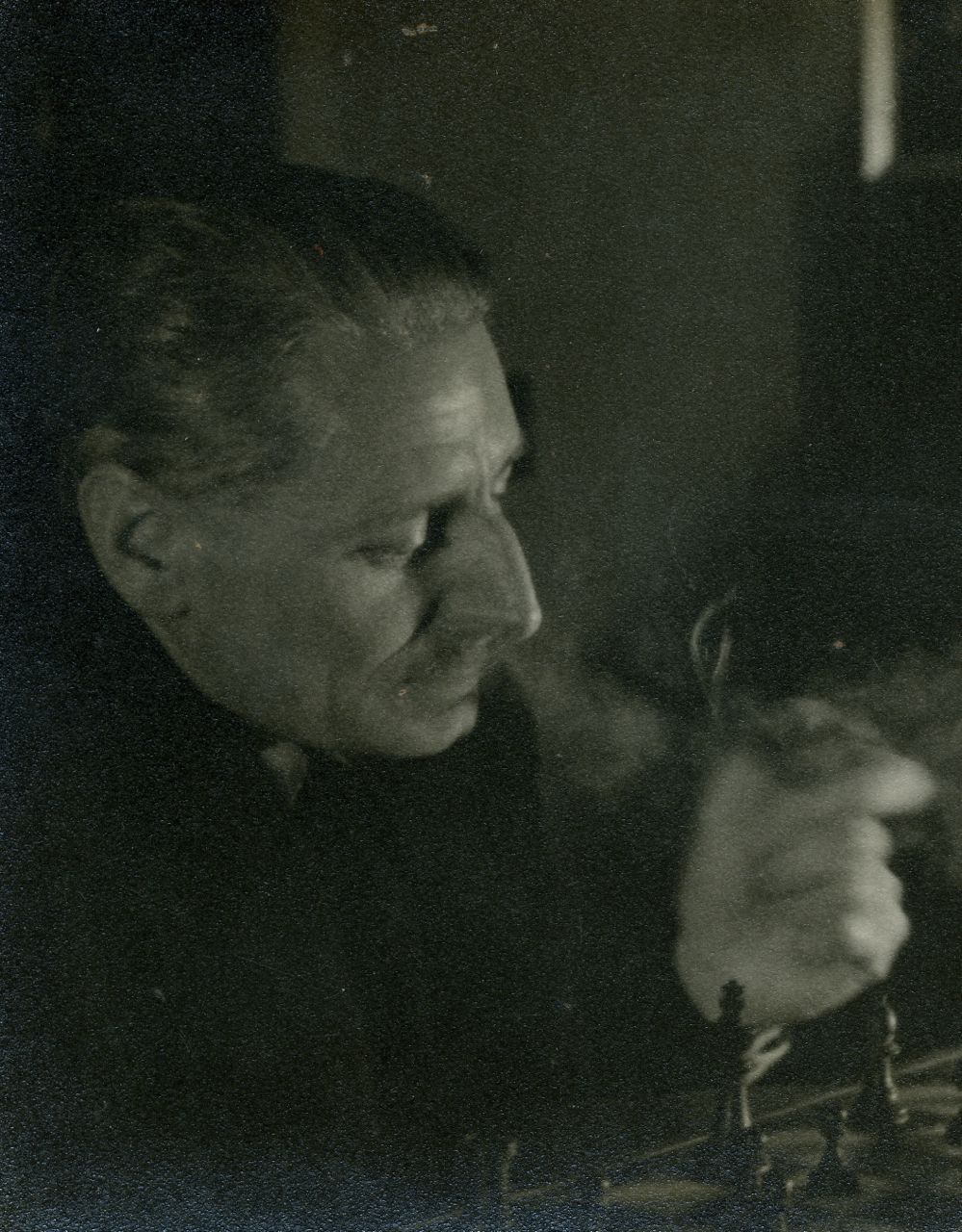
- Born: 29 January 1896; Aston, Birmingham, England
- Died: 17 December 1964 (aged 68); Bangor, County Down, Northern Ireland
- Occupation: Architect
- Buildings: Stranmillis College, Belfast; Telephone House, Belfast
- Projects: Police Stations in Northern Ireland; Cregagh Housing Estate, Belfast

Thomas Francis Ord Rippingham (29 January 1896 – 17 December 1964) was an English-born architect who spent most of his professional life in Northern Ireland, mainly working for the Northern Ireland Civil Service (NICS).

"Rip", as he was affectionately known to his friends, family and colleagues, was given the name Thomas Joseph Francis Rippingham at birth. His father was Thomas Henry Rippingham (11 February 1855 – 6 February 1928) and his mother was Annie Josephine Harris (1859 – 23 January 1936). Rippingham was born at 51 Kendal Road, Deritend, Aston, Birmingham, England, and was educated at St. Phillip's Grammar School, Edgbaston, which was situated alongside Cardinal Newman's Oratory in Birmingham. After he left St. Phillip's he was an articled pupil, for two and a half years, and then an assistant, for three and a half years, to A. Hill Parker, ARIBA, of The Avenue, Worcester, England.

Rip enlisted in the Royal Warwickshire Regiment on 2 March 1916 and was called up for service in the Royal Army Ordnance Corps on 1 November 1916, Regimental No. 024526. He served in the R.A.O.C. for three years and four months, with three years and two months “in the field” in France and at the Somme in the First World War. On 30 March 1920, he was transferred from the R.A.O.C. Unit 51. O.A.S. (either the Ordnance Ammunition Section or the Ordnance Architectural Section) to the Army Reserve, Middlesex Regiment, with the rank of Sergeant.

T.F.O. Rippingham worked on many projects and designs which have become part of the Ulster landscape. One of his most characteristic and well known designs was that for the police stations which were built throughout Northern Ireland in the years following the creation in 1921 of Northern Ireland as a separate polity, following the Partition of Ireland.

== Works ==
- Stranmillis College, Belfast:
  - Main building(1928–1930).
  - Henry Garrett Building (1944).
- Northern Ireland Police Stations(1920s–30s) – originally constructed at Ballyronan, Bushmills, Cloughmills, Dromara, Dundrum, Florencecourt, Gilford, Greencastle, Lisbellaw, Loughbrickland, Saintfield, and Seaforde and other places.
- Telephone House, Belfast (1931–1934).
- Cregagh Housing Estate, Belfast (1945–1950).
- Buildings for the postal service in Northern Ireland, in: Banbridge, Bangor, Belfast (2 buildings), Holywood, Limavady.
- Petty Sessions Court House, Chichester Street, Belfast.
- Other buildings in Northern Ireland include:
  - a public (state) primary school in the Cregagh Estate.
  - an estate of houses for the Admiralty, Antrim.
  - housing for power station workers, Ballylumford.
  - a factory office building, Armagh.
  - a small war memorial monument, Belfast City Hall.
  - the conservation of Hillsborough Castle, Hillsborough.
  - the restoration of Carrickfergus Castle, Carrickfergus.
  - private houses (probably no more than ten).
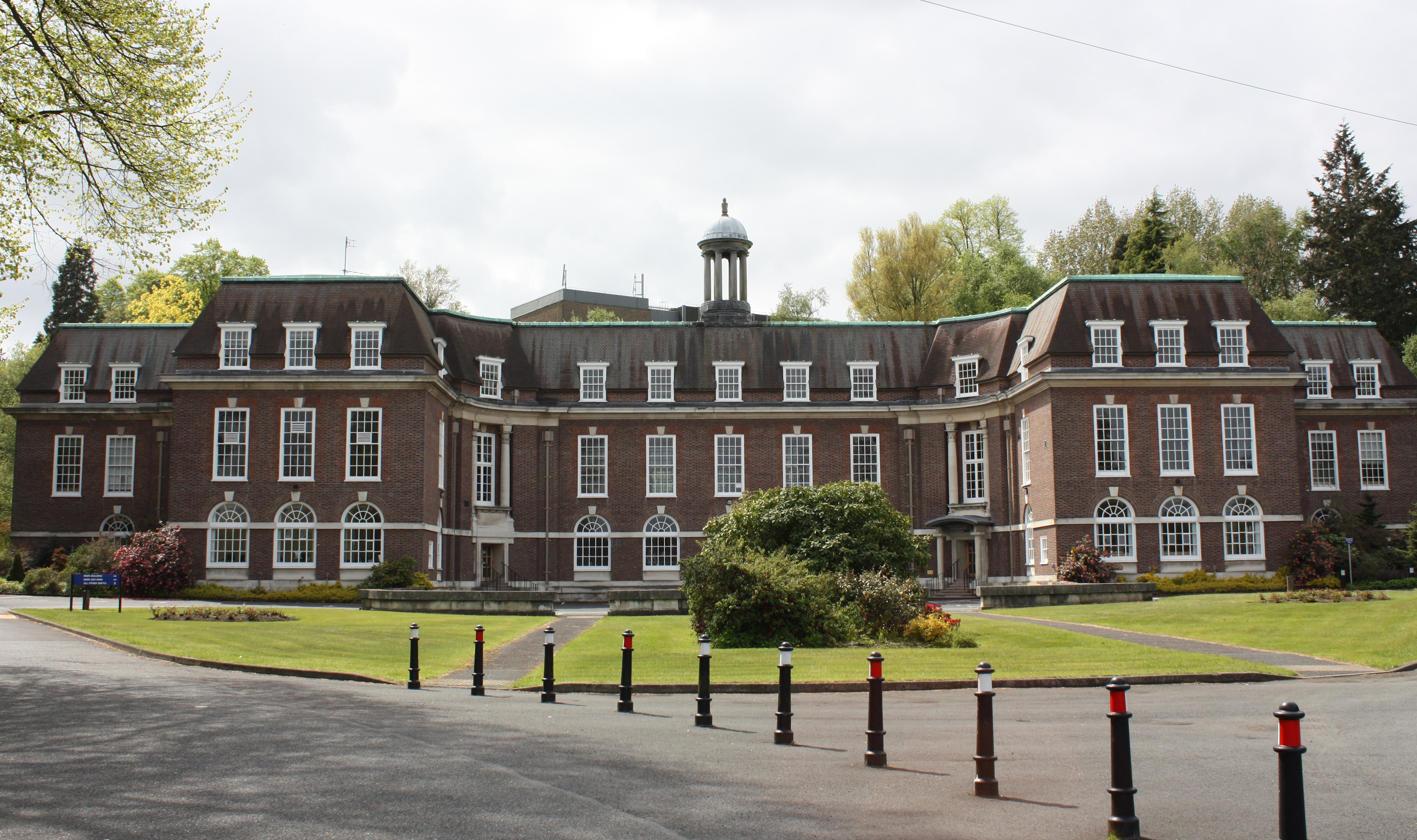
The main building, Stranmillis University College, May 2010

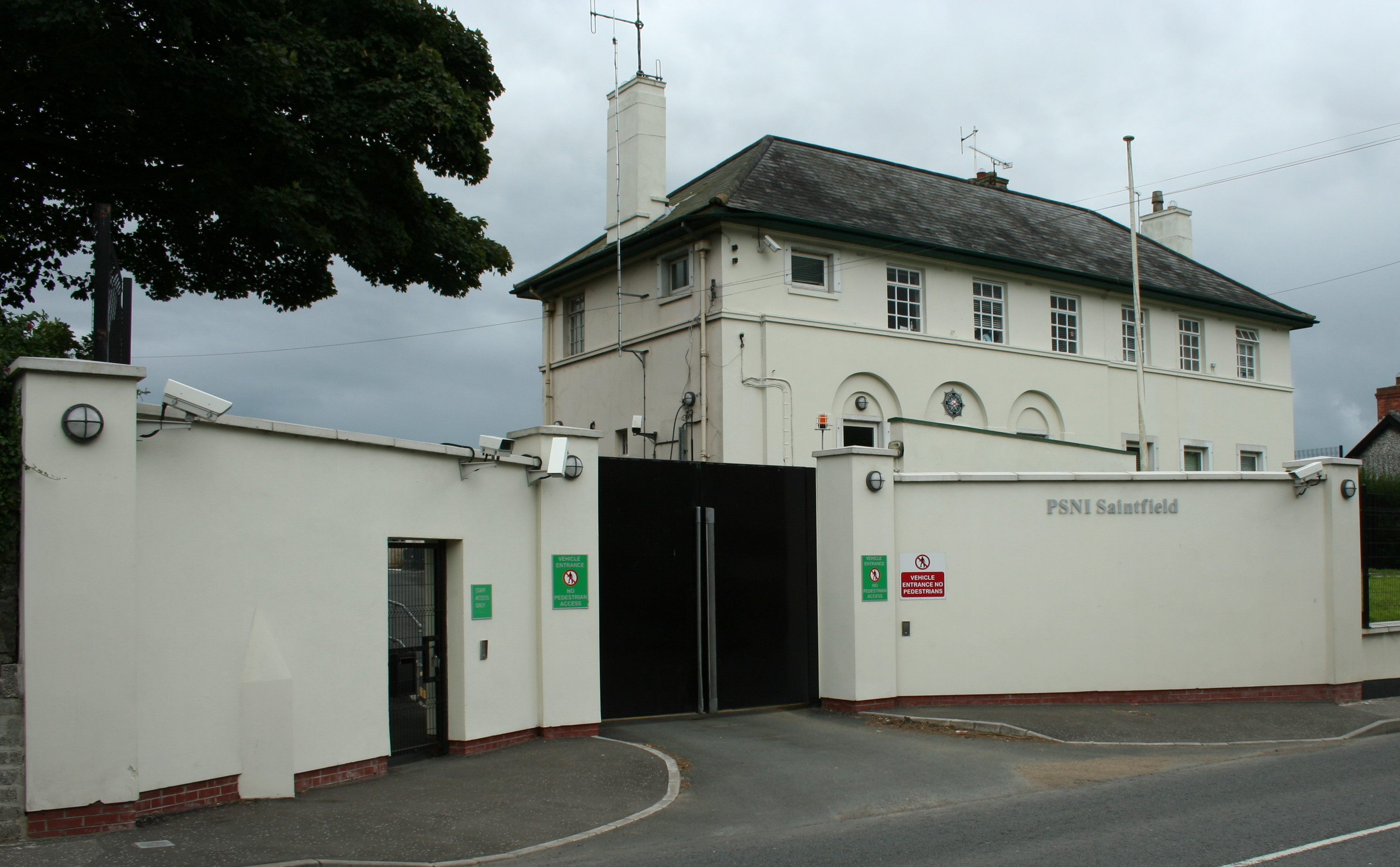
Saintfield P.S.N.I. Station - the Rippingham building is almost hidden by modern defensive walls

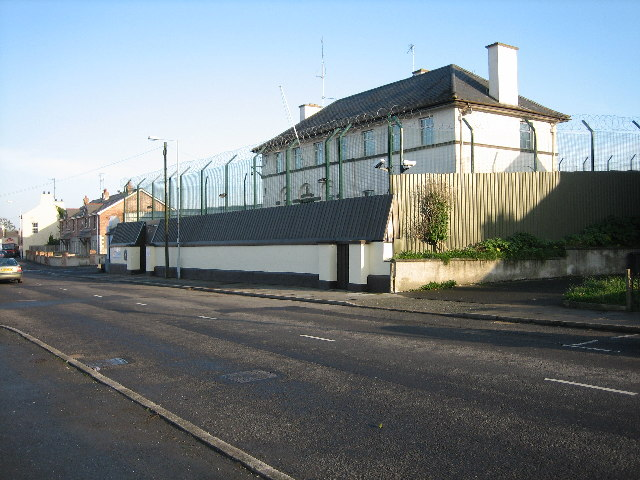
Dromara P.S.N.I. Station

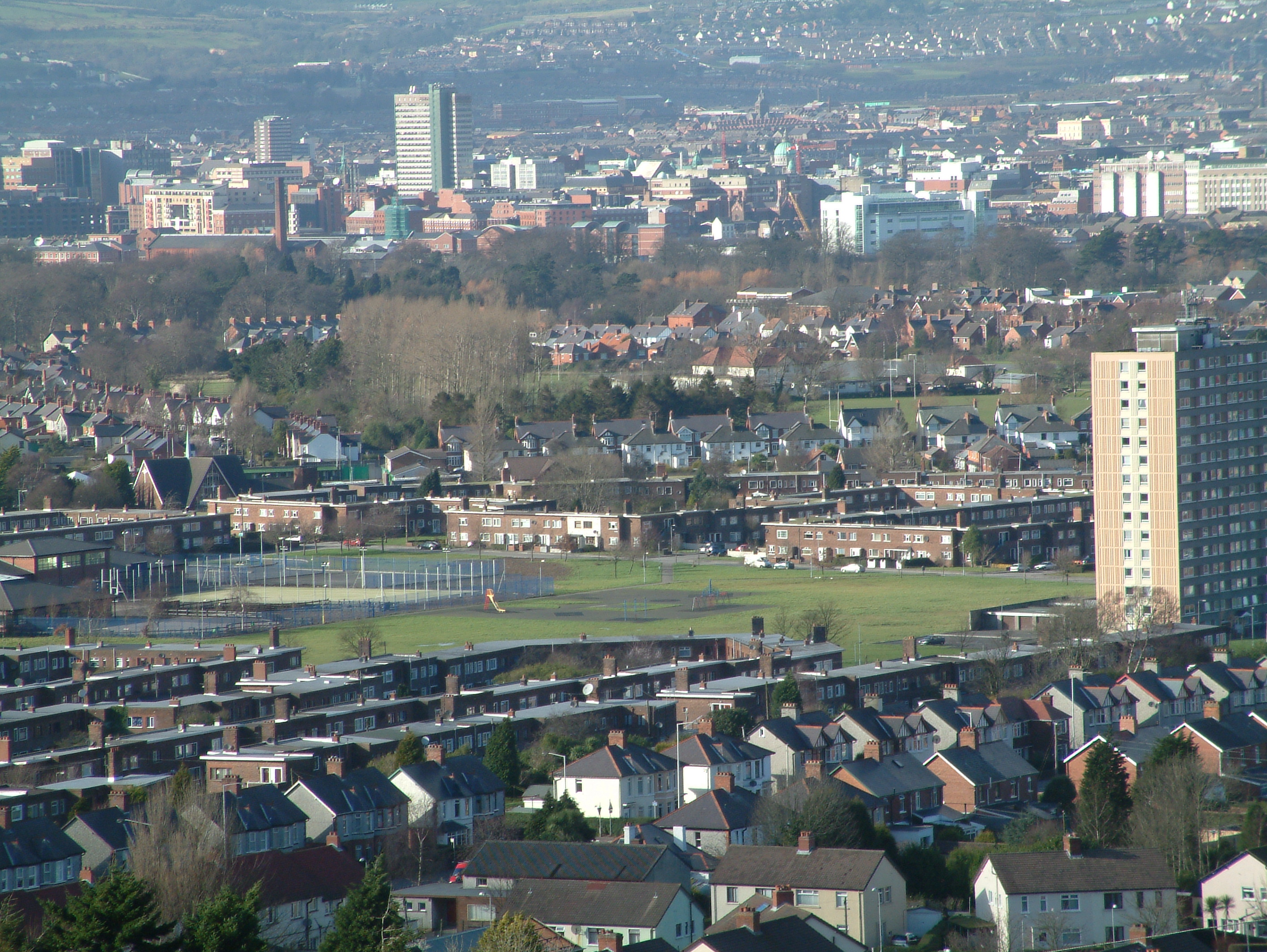
Cregagh Housing Estate in South East Belfast

== See also ==
- Stranmillis College
- Cregagh
