= Des McKibbin =

Rugby union player from Northern Ireland

- Full name: Desmond McKibbin
- Born: 6 March 1927 Belfast, Northern Ireland
- Died: 2 October 1999 (aged 72) Dublin, Ireland

Rugby union career
- Position: Prop / Lock
International career
Years	Team	Apps	(Points)
1950–51	Ireland	8	(3)

Desmond McKibbin (6 March 1927 — 2 October 1999) was an Ireland rugby union international from Northern Ireland.

McKibbin was born in Belfast and educated at Royal Belfast Academical Institution.

A forward, McKibbin played his rugby for Instonians and gained eight Ireland caps. He featured in all four matches of the 1951 Five Nations which Ireland won, with only a final round draw with Wales costing them a grand slam.

McKibbin was Ireland's team manager on the 1985 tour of Japan, after which he served two years as IRFU president.

His elder brother Harry, as well as nephews Alistair and Harry Jr, were also capped for Ireland.

== See also ==
- List of Ireland national rugby union players
