= Cregagh =

Area of Belfast, Northern Ireland

- Area
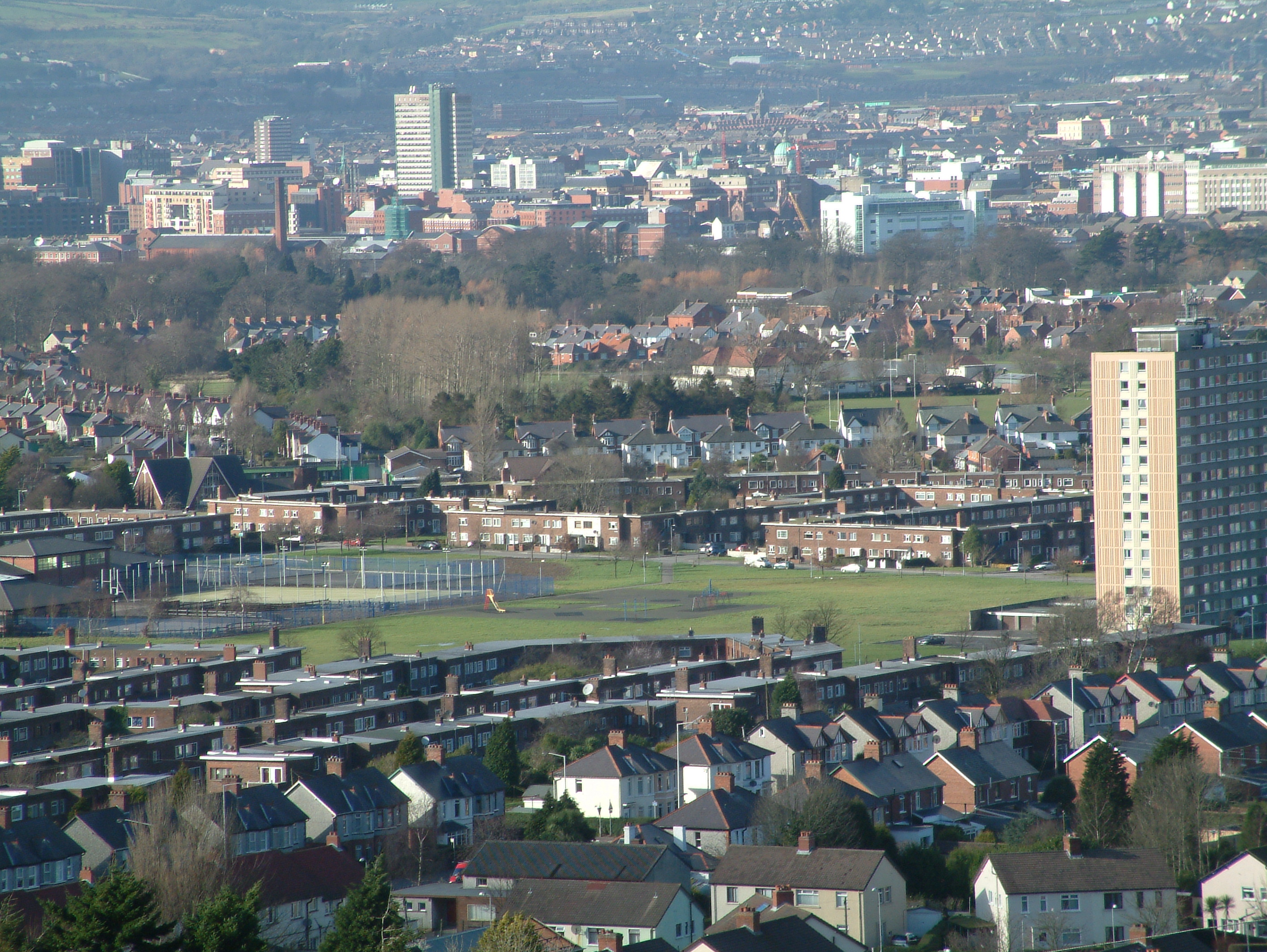
- Cregagh Estate in Southeast Belfast

- Location within Northern Ireland
- Coordinates: 54°35′03″N 5°53′56″W
- Sovereign state: United Kingdom
- Country: Northern Ireland
- County: County Down
- Municipality: Belfast

Cregagh (from Irish an Chreagaigh 'the rocky place') is an area in the southeast of Belfast, Northern Ireland. It is the name of a townland and has been adopted as the name of an electoral ward of Belfast City council. The townland dates back to medieval times, when it was part of the territory held by the O'Neills of Clannaboy. The area is centred on the Cregagh Road. The Woodstock/Cregagh Road is a continuous arterial route in the city, with the Woodstock making up the lower half of the route and the Cregagh the upper half. It runs from the Albertbridge Road, close to the Short Strand, to the A55 Outer Ring road.

== Woodstock Road ==
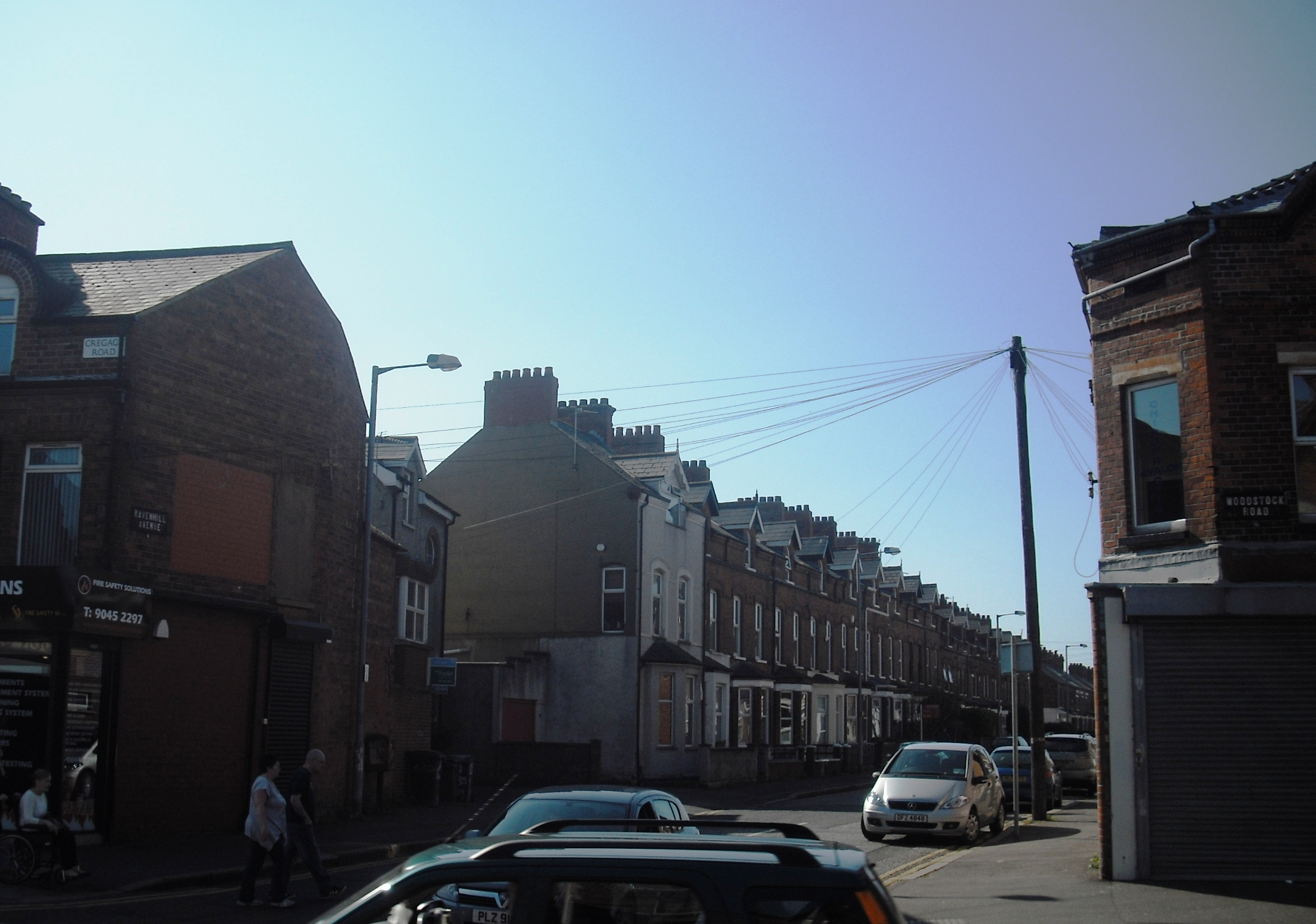
Ravenhill Avenue with the Woodstock Road to the right and the Cregagh Road to the left

The Woodstock Road forms the beginning of the continuous road that includes Cregagh and which runs from close to the River Lagan to the outskirts of Belfast. The road begins at the end of Woodstock Link, which itself starts at a junction which turns off from the Albertbridge Road facing Mountpottinger Road. The Mount, a prominent conference facility built in 1997, is located close to this junction on the Woodstock Link. Following the junction with the Beersbridge Road the Woodstock Road is mainly lined with shops and other places of business. The area, also known as Willowfield, is also home to a number of churches, including the Church of Ireland place of worship Willowfield Parish Church, Saint Anthony's Roman Catholic Church. and the Cregagh Gospel Hall. Other amenities include a public library and a Police Service of Northern Ireland station. The Willowfield area formerly lent its name to the Belfast Willowfield constituency of the old Parliament of Northern Ireland.

An Ulster loyalist flute band, Crimson Star, is based in the area and their badge is shown on a mural painted on a wall on Ardenvohr Street just off the Woodstock Road. During the Troubles notorious Ulster Volunteer Force hitman Robert "Squeak" Seymour ran a video shop on the Woodstock Road. It was whilst working at his shop that Seymour was shot and killed by two Provisional Irish Republican Army operatives on 15 June 1988.

The Woodstock Road continues as far as Ravenhill Avenue where it becomes the Cregagh Road. The Woodstock Road was formerly known as the lower Cregagh Road and in the nineteenth century it was mainly made up of farmland. Until the 1920s parts of the Cregagh Road, which is now entirely urbanised, were agricultural.

== Lower Cregagh Road ==
At its lower stage, the Cregagh Road, like the Woodstock Road, is lined with several shops. This area also has a number of churches, the most prominent of which are Cregagh Methodist Church and Cregagh Presbyterian Church.

Just off the Cregagh Road, on Gibson Park Avenue, are two locally well-known sporting venues, Cregagh Cricket Club and Malone Rugby Club. Cregagh Cricket Club celebrated its centenary in 2006. The cricket ground is also used by Northern Amateur Football League club Orangefield Old Boys and is part of Cregagh Sports Club, effectively a merger of the cricket and association football clubs, with both sharing the same Gibson Park Avenue facilities. This alliance was concluded in the early 1980s, with the two clubs being previously unconnected. Ravenhill Stadium, the home of Ulster Rugby, lies a short distance away, about halfway between the Cregagh Road and the Ravenhill Road to the east.

== Cregagh Estate ==
The Cregagh Estate is located off the Cregagh Road, starting after the roundabout junction with Ladas Drive and Mount Merrion Avenue. The junction is immediately after Bell's Bridge which crosses the Loop River, one of Belfast's myriad minor rivers. The estate was built as a public housing project in 1946–1947 and was designed by government architect T. F. O. Rippingham. Tenants have subsequently been offered the opportunity to purchase their homes. The estate is characterised by its uncommon flat roofs and staggered house fronts. The streets in the Cregagh Estate are named after the rivers and streams of the island of Ireland (e.g. Callan Way, Kilbroney Bend).

Although predominantly Protestant from its inception, Cregagh had a significant Catholic minority for a number of years and at the start of the Troubles, Catholics even joined in local vigilante patrols under the auspices of the Cregagh Tenants Association. This co-operation ended in 1972 with the arrival of the Ulster Defence Association (UDA) and before long most of the Catholic residents had left the area for west Belfast. Around this time housing allocation in the area came under UDA control and the local "Tartan gangs" were taken over as the junior UDA. Subsequently, however the UDA declined in the area, and east Belfast in general, and the Ulster Volunteer Force became more important, with UVF murals being painted on Cregagh's walls. By 2018 however the only murals on Cregagh estate are one commemorating Victoria Cross winners Eric Norman Frankland Bell, Geoffrey Cather, William McFadzean and Robert Quigg and another showing local boy George Best.

== Upper Cregagh Road ==
Beyond the Cregagh estate the road is made up of mainly private housing and continues as far as Upper Knockbreda Road. Cregagh Library and the former home of Castlereagh Borough Council are found on this part of the road. The latter building has been extensively refurbished and is now the Museum of Orange Heritage. The neighbouring Montgomery Road is the location for the former Robinson Centre leisure facility and the Castlereagh campus of Belfast Metropolitan College. The area was sometimes nicknamed the "Bible belt". Immediately beyond the end of the Cregagh Road, on the opposite side of the Upper Knockbreda Road, is a forested area known as Cregagh Glen. The Upper Knockbreda Road, otherwise known as the A55 Outer Ring, was completed in 1967 to link Cregagh with the Knock area on the outskirts of east Belfast.

Some of the streets in Cregagh are named after Second World War generals (e.g. Montgomery, Alanbrooke) while a significant number are named after First World War battlefields (e.g. Picardy, Hamel). This connection with the wars reflects the numbers of people from the area who died in those wars. This was also a reason why the location was chosen for a large number of ex-servicemen's homes, with 150 of the so-called "homes fit for heroes" promised by David Lloyd George built around this area in the late 1920s. However this area, which was known locally as "the Colony", remained the only significant public housing scheme for ex-soldiers to be undertaken in Belfast in the aftermath of the First World War.

A memorial to the dead of the First World War, consisting of a Celtic Cross, was unveiled in 1929 before being rededicated in 1932 by Edward, Prince of Wales. Castlereagh council expanded the memorial a number of times during the 1990s, adding a stone for the Ulster Special Constabulary, another stone for the Ulster Defence Regiment and a back plaque commemorating members of both of these groups and the Royal Ulster Constabulary as well as civilians killed during the Troubles and local residents who died during the Second World War.

== Notable people ==
The late footballer George Best grew up in the Cregagh Estate (No. 16 Burren Way), and as a boy played football on the open playing fields at the centre of the estate. These playing fields, Cregagh Green, are now protected for community recreation in perpetuity as a Fields in Trust Active Space. Best's funeral originated from Burren Way where his father continued to live until his death in April 2008. George Best is commemorated by a mural in the Cregagh estate and formerly by another on the Woodstock Road.

Singer-songwriter David McWilliams, who achieved mainstream success with his song "Days of Pearly Spencer", was born in the Cregagh estate although he moved to Ballymena at an early age.

Former Democratic Unionist Party (DUP) politician Iris Robinson grew up in the Cregagh estate and met her husband, future First Minister of Northern Ireland Peter Robinson, at Castlereagh College, where they both studied.

== Politics ==
Sections of the Woodstock and Cregagh roads mark the official boundary between the Westminster constituencies of Belfast East and Belfast South, with the area being divided between the two. This division is replicated in the Belfast East and Belfast South Stormont constituencies, which make use of the same electoral map. In local government, the area falls under the authority of Belfast City Council, with the roads running through the Titanic and Lisnasharragh district electoral areas (DEAs).

The Cregagh area also lends its name to one of the Lisnasharragh DEA's six wards. With the upper Cregagh Road forming the ward's eastern edge, it encompasses the Cregagh Estate and streets as far south as Upper Knockbreda Road, and as far west as Knockbreda Park and Mount Merrion Avenue. As part of the DEA, Cregagh has been represented by Councillors Michael Long and Eric Hanvey (Alliance Party of Northern Ireland) (APNI), Brian Smyth (Green Party), Davy Douglas and Bradley Ferguson (DUP), and Séamus De Faoite (Social Democratic and Labour Party) since May 2023.

The ward lies within the Belfast East constituencies. Following the 2022 Assembly election, Naomi Long and Peter McReynolds (APNI), Joanne Bunting and David Brooks (DUP), and Andy Allen (Ulster Unionist Party) (UUP) have represented the area as Members of the Legislative Assembly (MLAs). Gavin Robinson (DUP) has represented the constituency in the House of Commons since 2015. East Belfast has historically been strongly Unionist, with Nationalist parties consistently performing poorly at elections, and Cregagh reflects this trend. However, the constituency does have a strong centrist presence, appearing to be something of a stronghold for the Alliance Party. It is between this party and the DUP, which has proven to be the dominant political rivalry in the area.

== Transport ==
Woodstock and Cregagh are served by Service 6 of the Metro buses provided by Translink which links the areas with Belfast city centre at one end and Forestside Shopping Centre at the other.
