= Freddie McLennan =

Former Irish rugby union player

- Born: 8 February 1951 (age 75)
- School: Newbridge College
- Occupation: Architect

Rugby union career
- Position: Wing
Amateur team(s)
Years	Team	Apps	(Points)
- Wanderers
International career
Years	Team	Apps	(Points)
1977–1981	Ireland	18	(16)

Freddie McLennan (born 8 February 1951) is a former Irish rugby union international player, playing for Ireland on the left wing.

McLennan was educated at Newbridge College and played schools rugby for them. He played his club rugby career for Wanderers FC.

McLennan was capped 18 times for Ireland and scored a number of times for the national side. His debut came against France in March 1977. He formed part of the 1979 Ireland rugby union tour of Australia and was part of Ireland's 1981 tour of South Africa. He featured in Ireland's Five Nations Championship squads in 1977, 1978, 1979, 1980 and 1981. McLennan's last games in an Irish shirt came on tour in June 1981 against South Africa at Kings Park Stadium in Durban – in the first test he scored a try but Ireland went on to lose, in the second he received a knee to the head and became concussed.

A qualified architect by trade, McLennan decided to remain in South Africa after the Irish rugby team left, along with teammate John Robbie, and made a life for himself there.
