= Seamus Deering =

Irish rugby union player

- Full name: Seamus Joseph Deering
- Born: 18 November 1906 Dunlavin, Co. Wicklow, Ireland
- Died: 15 March 1989 (aged 82)

Rugby union career
- Position: Lock
International career
Years	Team	Apps	(Points)
1935–37	Ireland	9	(0)

Seamus Joseph Deering (18 November 1906 — 15 March 1989) was an Irish international rugby union player.

Born in Dunlavin, Co. Wicklow, Deering was the younger brother of rugby player turned politician Mark Deering.

Deering, a second row forward, played his rugby for Bective and Garryowen. He was capped nine times for Ireland between 1935 and 1937, which included an appearance against the 1935–36 All Blacks.

Post rugby, Deering was employed as a Wages Board inspector for the Department of Agriculture.

Deering was the father of 1970s Ireland flanker Shay Deering.

== See also ==
- List of Ireland national rugby union players
