= Harry McKibbin =

Irish rugby international (1915–2001)

- Full name: Henry Roger McKibbin
- Born: 13 July 1915 Belfast, Northern Ireland
- Died: 3 September 2001 (aged 86) Belfast, Northern Ireland
- School: Royal Belfast Academical Institution
- University: Queen's University Belfast
- Notable relative(s): Des McKibbin (brother); Alistair McKibbin (son); Harry McKibbin Jr (son); Roger Wilson (grandson)
- Occupation: Solicitor

Rugby union career
- Position: Centre
International career
Years	Team	Apps	(Points)
1938–39	Ireland	4	(7)
1938	British Lions	3	(5)

Henry Roger McKibbin CBE (13 July 1915 – 3 September 2001) was an Ireland rugby union international from Northern Ireland who became a prominent rugby administrator.

== Biography ==
McKibbin, born in Belfast, was an elder brother of Ireland forward Des McKibbin. He attended Royal Belfast Academical Institution and was a 1st XV player for four years, captaining the 1934 Ulster Schools' Cup-winning side. A goal-kicking centre, McKibbin played for Queen's University RFC while studying for a legal degree. He featured in two Senior Cup successes with Queen's.

In 1938, McKibbin gained the first of his four Ireland caps as a 22-year old in the Home Nations match against Wales in Swansea and then won a place on the British Lions squad for that year's tour to South Africa, where he was the only back that played all three Tests. This included a five-point win over the Springboks in Cape Town, with his penalty goal and conversion proving important. He finished the trip with 32 points from 16 tour appearances.

McKibbin was capped for Ireland in three 1939 Home Nations matches to round out his international career.

During World War II, McKibbin served with the Royal Artillery and escaped Dunkirk on the HMS Icarus in the 1941 evacuation. He fought the Japanese in the Burma jungles from 1942 to 1945 and ultimately reached the rank of major.

McKibbin, a solicitor by profession, was assistant manager for the 1962 British Lions tour to South Africa and served as president of the Irish Rugby Football Union from 1974 to 1975. In the 1976 New Year Honours, McKibbin was a recipient of the Commander of the Order of the British Empire for "services to Irish Rugby Football".

Two sons, Alistair and Harry Jr, were also Ireland internationals.

== See also ==
- List of Ireland national rugby union players
