= Tom Feighery =

Irish rugby union player

- Full name: Thomas Anthony Oliver Feighery
- Born: 16 January 1945 (age 81) Dublin, Ireland
- Notable relative: Con Feighery (brother)

Rugby union career
- Position: Prop
International career
Years	Team	Apps	(Points)
1977	Ireland	2	(0)

Thomas Anthony Oliver Feighery (born 16 January 1945) is an Irish former international rugby union player.

Feighery, a Dublin doctor, played for Leinster, University College Dublin and St Mary's College.

A prop, Feighery won an international call up for the 1976 tour of New Zealand, but didn't feature in any of the Test matches. He made his belated debut in Ireland's 1977 Five Nations opener against Wales, the day before his 32nd birthday, then gained a second cap at home against England.

Feighery is the elder brother of Ireland player Con Feighery.

== See also ==
- List of Ireland national rugby union players
