= Laurent Pardo (rugby union) =

France international rugby union player

Laurent Pardo (born Bayonne, 19 February 1958) is a former French rugby union player. He played as fullback, wing and centre.

He played for Aviron Bayonnais, from 1978/79 to 1982/83. He won the Challenge Yves-du-Manoir in 1980 and was runners-up of the Top 14 in 1981/82. He played afterwards for US Montferrand, from 1982/83 to 1986/87. He also played for Racing Club de France, Stade Hendayais, in France, and for San Sebastián, in Spain.

He had 14 caps for France, from 1980 to 1985, scoring 3 tries, 12 points on aggregate. He played three times at the Five Nations Championship in 1981, 1982 and 1985, being winner in the first edition. He had 9 caps and scored all the points of his international career at the competition.

He is currently vice-president of Stade Hendayais.
