= Gwyn Evans (rugby union, born 1957) =

British Lions & Wales international rugby union footballer

- Born: Gwyn Evans; 6 September 1957 (age 69) Maesteg, Wales
- School: Maesteg Comprehensive
- University: University College, Swansea

Rugby union career
- Position: Fullback
Amateur team(s)
Years	Team	Apps	(Points)
- Maesteg RFC
–	Barbarian F.C.		
International career
Years	Team	Apps	(Points)
1981–1983	Wales	12	(74)
1983	British Lions	2	(3)

Gwyn Evans (born 6 September 1957 in Maesteg) is a former Wales international rugby union player. In 1983 he toured New Zealand with the British & Irish Lions. He played club rugby for Maesteg RFC.

== Notes ==
Sporting positions
Preceded by (Italy) Isidoro Quaglio	Italy National Rugby Union Coach; 1977–1978	Succeeded by (France) Pierre Villepreux
