= Frank Wilson (rugby union, born 1952) =

Rugby union player from Northern Ireland

- Full name: Francis Wilson
- Born: 1 September 1952 (age 74) Belfast, Northern Ireland

Rugby union career
- Position: Fullback
International career
Years	Team	Apps	(Points)
1977	Ireland	3	(0)

Francis Wilson (born 1 September 1952) is a former Ireland rugby union international from Northern Ireland.

Wilson, born in Belfast, attended Belfast Boys' Model School and was a member of their 1971 Ulster Schools' Cup-winning side, which remains the only time the school has claimed the title. Mainly a fullback, he was capped three times for Ireland, all in the 1977 Five Nations Championship. He captained his club CIYMS to the 1977-78 Ulster Cup title.

== See also ==
- List of Ireland national rugby union players
