= Steve Munro (rugby union) =

Scotland international rugby union player

- Born: Stephen Munro; 11 June 1958 (age 68) Ayr, Scotland
- Height: 6 ft 0 in (1.83 m)

Rugby union career
- Position: Wing
Amateur team(s)
Years	Team	Apps	(Points)
- Ayr
–	West of Scotland		
Provincial / State sides
Years	Team	Apps	(Points)
- Glasgow District
1984	Whites Trial		
1986	Combined Scottish Districts		
International career
Years	Team	Apps	(Points)
- Scotland U16
1979-80	Scotland 'B'	2	(0)
1980-84	Scotland	10	(8)

Steve Munro (born 11 June 1958) is a former Scotland international rugby union player. He played as a Wing.

== Rugby Union career ==
=== Amateur career ===
Munro was described as a fast and powerful winger.

He played for Ayr. He was Scotland's leading try scorer in the 1978-79 season with 36 tries, all bar one try scored with Ayr.

He moved on to play for West of Scotland.

=== Provincial career ===
He played for Glasgow District against New Zealand in 1979, then for the Whites Trial side on 7 January 1984 in a 21 - 3 win, and for Combined Scottish Districts on 1 March 1986 against South of Scotland.

=== International career ===
He was first noticed by Scotland Schools and capped by them.

He was capped by Scotland 'B' to play Ireland 'B' on 1 December 1979 and played in the Scotland 'B' side against France 'B' in the spring of 1980.

He went on to receive 10 full senior caps for Scotland from 1980 to 1984. He scored two tries at Twickenham on 21 February 1981, although Scotland remained on the losing side. His last cap against Wales in 1984 came after an international absence of two years, but his performance for Whites Trial earlier that year ensured his selection.
