= Ned Byrne =

Irish hurler and rugby union player

Edward Michael Joseph Byrne
Personal information
- Native name: Éadbhard Micheál Seosamh Ó Broin (Irish)
- Born: 14 September 1948 (age 78) Kilkenny, Ireland

Sport
- Sport: Hurling
- Position: Forward
Club
- Years: Club
- James Stephens
Club titles
- Kilkenny titles: 2
Inter-county
- Years: County
- 1971-1972: Kilkenny
Inter-county titles
- Leinster titles: 2
- All-Irelands: 1

Edward Michael Joseph "Ned" Byrne (born 14 September 1948) is a former Irish Gaelic footballer and rugby player. He played hurling with his local club James Stephens and the Kilkenny senior inter-county team in the 1970s, and between 1977 and 1978 represented Ireland at rugby union.

== Early life ==
Byrne was born in Kilkenny in 1948. He was educated locally at Kilkenny CBS where he first became interested in the game of hurling. Byrne later attended the Cistercian College in Roscrea where he continued hurling but also started playing rugby union.

This was at a time when Gaelic Athletic Association members were not allowed to play non-Gaelic games and Byrne was duly banned from being a member of the college hurling team in fifth year. In his final year at school Byrne left the college rugby team and played hurling instead.

== Hurling career ==
=== Club ===
Byrne played his club hurling and football with his local St. Canice's GAA club. He won county minor titles in both codes in 1964, however, the club disbanded shortly after and Byrne joined the famous James Stephens club. Here he won a senior county title in 1969.

Byrne captured a second county medal in 1975, however, he later left the team to concentrate on his rugby career. In doing this he missed out on the greatest day in James Stephens’ history as the club defeated the mighty Blackrock in the All-Ireland club final in 1976. In the early 1990s Byrne returned to James Stephens as trainer of the club's senior hurling team.

=== Inter-county ===
Byrne first came to prominence on the inter-county scene as a member of the unsuccessful Kilkenny minor hurling team in 1964. He later joined the senior team, however, it would be 1971 before he became a regular on the team, making his debut in the National Hurling League. That year Byrne won a Leinster title, however, Kilkenny were later beaten by Tipperary in a thrilling All-Ireland final. The following year he captured a second Leinster medal before later lining out in his second All-Ireland final. Arch-rivals Cork provided the opposition and, for a while, it looked as if the Leesiders were cruising to victory. Kilkenny fought back to win the game and Byrne collected an All-Ireland medal.

== Rugby career ==
Byrne had played rugby union since his secondary school days. He later played with the Kilkenny and Wanderers in the 1960s. Immediately following the 1972 All-Ireland hurling final victory Byrne joined Blackrock College and he soon started to make the Leinster team for representative matches. His talent was quickly noted and he later made his debut for Ireland in a 1977 Five Nations Championship game against Scotland. Byrne won five more caps in the front row but never finished on a winning team.

In 1979, he was the first-choice tight-head prop in the Ireland team that went on a tour to Australia. That tour remains famous for Ollie Campbell taking over Tony Ward’s out-half spot, however, for Byrne it was memorable for quite a different reason.

A group of players were coming back from a race meeting one night when, standing on a path waiting to cross the road, he was hit by a car which didn't stop. His leg was broken in three places and he wasn't able to play rugby again until early 1982. Byrne, however, recovered sufficiently to help Blackrock win the Leinster Senior Cup and Leinster Senior League in 1983.
