= Eileen Flynn case =

1982-85 Irish series of court cases

Eileen Roche (née Flynn; 1955 – 9 September 2008) was a schoolteacher in County Wexford, Ireland, who was dismissed in 1982 for cohabiting with a married man. In 1985, the High Court ruled this did not constitute unfair dismissal.

== Dismissal ==
Flynn was raised a Roman Catholic, and graduated from University College, Galway. She began teaching Irish and history in 1978 at the Holy Faith Convent in New Ross, a girls' Catholic school run by the Sisters of the Holy Faith. In 1980–1981, she began a relationship with Richie Roche, a separated father of three who ran a pub in the town. Divorce was illegal in Ireland at the time. The school principal warned her that parents had complained of the scandal and that she would be sacked if she continued; Flynn maintained that her private life was not the school's business. In November 1981 Flynn moved into Roche's house and in April 1982 announced her pregnancy to the new principal, Sister Mary Anna Power, who offered to arrange for her to give birth in London and put the child up for adoption. The same month the school manager said that she would be dismissed unless she changed her "lifestyle". Flynn gave birth in Ireland on 6 June 1982 and determined to raise the child with Roche. On 6 August, the manager said that because of her "open rejection of the norms and behaviour and the ideals which [the] school exists to promote" she must resign or be dismissed. She refused to resign and was dismissed on 22 August with effect from 20 November.

== Court cases ==
On 29 August 1982, Flynn told the principal she had contacted a solicitor and would contest the dismissal. In March 1983, she took her case to the Employment Appeal Tribunal, alleging unfair dismissal under the Unfair Dismissals Act, 1977, which prohibits pregnancy discrimination. In February 1984, the tribunal rejected her appeal. She appealed to the Circuit Court, where two parents of students testified at having made written complaints about Flynn to the school. Judge Noel Ryan upheld the tribunal verdict, commenting that the nuns had been too lenient with Flynn. On 8 March 1985 in the High Court, Declan Costello upheld Ryan's verdict, on the basis that her dismissal was not due to her pregnancy per se but rather to her non-marital relationship. Flynn could not afford an appeal to the Supreme Court. She was represented in court by solicitor Simon Kennedy.

=== Commentary ===
The case was the subject of much media comment and public controversy in the period. Colm Tóibín described the reports on the Gay Byrne Show as reminiscent of a Thomas Hardy novel. Feminist and liberal commentators at the time and in retrospect have seen it as one of a series of events illustrating a conservative Catholic society unsympathetic to women; others include the 1983 abortion referendum, the 1984 death of Ann Lovett, the 1984 Kerry Babies case, the 1985 moving statues, and the 1986 divorce referendum. The fact that Richie Roche was a Sinn Féin activist meant that RTÉ would not interview him for fear of breaching Section 31 of the Broadcasting Act. (Flynn herself was not in Sinn Féin.)

Flynn was not a member of the Association of Secondary Teachers, Ireland (ASTI) union; an ASTI official later suggested members would have had mixed feelings about supporting her case. The Unfair Dismissals Act 1977 has been amended since 1985; however, Flynn herself, as well as political and legal commentators, have contended that the law would permit similar dismissal; in particular that section 37(1) of the Employment Equality Act 1998 allowed schools to sanction teachers for "undermining the religious ethos of the institution". This provision was weakened in 2015 for schools in receipt of public funding (which applies to virtually all religiously run schools).

== Subsequent life ==
Flynn later give birth to a second child as well as raising Roche's three previous children. The couple ran public houses and married in a civil ceremony on 8 September 1997, just seven months after the law legalising divorce in Ireland was brought into force following the 1995 referendum. Eileen Roche resumed teaching about 2005, in the Christian Brothers primary school. She died suddenly on 9 September 2008 and her funeral was held on 12 September 2008.

== See also ==
- Education controversies in the Republic of Ireland

== Sources ==
- Flynn v. Power [1985] IEHC 1, [1985] IR 648 (8 March 1985)
- Upton, John (1995). "Teachers Contracts of Employment: A Perspective from the Irish Courts". Law & Justice: The Christian Law Review. 124/125: 54.
- Whyte, Gerry (2005). "Protecting Religious Ethos in Employment Law: A Clash of Cultures". Dublin University Law Journal. 27: 169.
