= Jimmy Bowen (rugby union) =

Irish rugby union player

- Full name: Daniel St James Bowen
- Born: 11 February 1957 (age 69) Cork, Ireland

Rugby union career
- Position: Wing
International career
Years	Team	Apps	(Points)
1977	Ireland	3	(0)

Daniel St James Bowen (born 11 February 1957) is an Irish former rugby union international.

Bowen was born and raised in Cork, attending Presentation Brothers College.

A winger, Bowen was capped three times for Ireland in the 1977 Five Nations Championship, aged 19 at the time of his debut against Wales. The following year, he was part of the Munster side that beat the touring All Blacks, with his line break setting up the game's only try. He had six knee operations during an injury plagued career, which was spent with Cork Constitution, Lansdowne, and St Mary's College.

== See also ==
- List of Ireland national rugby union players
