= Graham Hogg (rugby union, born 1948) =

Scotland international rugby union player

- Born: Charles Graham Hogg; 2 March 1948 Hawick, Scotland
- Died: 8 August 2017 (aged 69) Edinburgh, Scotland

Rugby union career
- Position: Wing
Amateur team(s)
| Years | Team | Apps | (Points) |
| - | Hawick Wanderers | | |
| – | Hawick Linden | | |
| – | Hawick | | |
| – | Boroughmuir | | |
Provincial / State sides
| Years | Team | Apps | (Points) |
| - | Edinburgh District | | |
International career
| Years | Team | Apps | (Points) |
| 1978 | Scotland | 2 | (0) |
Coaching career
- Years: Team
- –: Boroughmuir
- –: Edinburgh District
- 1996: Edinburgh Rugby
- –: Scottish Districts
- –: Scotland Students
- –: Scotland A
- –: Currie

Graham Hogg (2 March 1948 – 8 August 2017) was a Scotland international rugby union player and rugby union coach.

== Rugby Union career ==
=== Amateur career ===
A product of Hawick High School, Hogg played for Hawick Wanderers and Hawick Linden before moving to play for Hawick.

Hogg moved to Edinburgh University to study; and he then played for Boroughmuir.

In 1976, he was part of the Boroughmuir side that won the Melrose Sevens.

=== Provincial career ===
He played for Edinburgh District.

=== International career ===
His was capped twice by Scotland in 1978.

=== Coaching career ===
He coached Borughmuir and then Edinburgh District. When the side turned professional in 1996 he then coached Edinburgh Rugby. He then moved on to coach the combined Scottish Districts side and the Scotland Students side and then Scotland 'A'. He coached Scotland 'A' to the 1998 Grand Slam.

He then moved to coach Currie. He coached Currie to win the Scottish Premiership in 2006-07 and in 2009–10 seasons. Hogg had arrived at the club when they were in Division 4.

=== Administrative career ===
For a short while he was a Director of Currie.

He later became chairman of the club.

== Civil Service career ==
He worked with the Inland Revenue with HMRC.
