= Rhodri Lewis =

Wales international rugby union player

- Full name: John Rhodri Lewis
- Born: 25 February 1959 (age 67) Maesteg, Wales
- Height: 6 ft 2 in (188 cm)

Rugby union career
- Position: Flanker
International career
Years	Team	Apps	(Points)
1981–82	Wales	7	(4)

John Rhodri Lewis (born 25 February 1959) is a Welsh former rugby union international.

Born and raised in Maesteg, Lewis attended Maesteg Comprehensive and studied at South Glamorgan Institute. He was a flanker, best known for college rugby at the time of his Wales call-up, having only just signed with Cardiff RFC. Prior to college, he had played briefly at Bridgend. He earned seven Test caps for Wales across the 1981 and 1982 Five Nations campaigns. After his playing career, he coached Gloucestershire club Lydney RFC.

== See also ==
- List of Wales national rugby union players
