= Shay Deering =

Irish rugby union player

- Full name: Seamus Mary Deering
- Born: 5 August 1948 Dublin, Ireland
- Died: 3 November 1988 (aged 40) Mullingar, Co. Westmeath

Rugby union career
- Position: Flanker
International career
| Years | Team | Apps | (Points) |
| 1974–1978 | Ireland | 8 | (0) |

Seamus Mary Deering (5 August 1948 – 3 November 1988) was an Irish rugby union international.

Born in Dublin, Deering was a son of the 1930s Ireland lock of the same name and a nephew of Ireland player turned politician Mark Deering. He attended St Mary's College and captained them to a Leinster Schools Cup title.

Deering, a flanker, played for University College Dublin and Garryowen. He gained eight caps for Ireland between 1974 and 1978, captaining the team for his final appearance against the All Blacks at Lansdowne Road.

A veterinary inspector by profession, Deering died of cancer in 1988, aged 40. The Shay Deering Trophy was named in his honour and is awarded annually to the winner of the Garryowen and St Marys match.

== See also ==
- List of Ireland national rugby union players
