= Donald MacDonald (rugby union) =

Scotland international rugby union player

Donald Macdonald
- Born: Donald Shaw Mackinnon Macdonald; 25 September 1951 (age 75)

Rugby union career
Amateur team(s)
| Years | Team | Apps | (Points) |
- Oxford University RFC
Senior career
| Years | Team | Apps | (Points) |
- London Scottish
Provincial / State sides
| Years | Team | Apps | (Points) |
- West of Scotland
International career
| Years | Team | Apps | (Points) |
| 1977–78 | Scotland | 7 | |

Donald Shaw Mackinnon Macdonald (born 25 September 1951) was a Scottish international rugby union player.

He was capped for Scotland seven times between 1977 and 1978. He also played for Oxford University RFC, London Scottish FC, and West of Scotland FC.

His older brother Dugald Macdonald was also capped for South Africa against the 1974 British Lions tour to South Africa.
