= Ron Wilson (rugby union) =

Scottish rugby union player (born 1954)

- Born: Ronald Wilson; 7 January 1954 (age 72) Teddington, England

Rugby union career
- Position: Fly half
Amateur team(s)
Years	Team	Apps	(Points)
- London Scottish
Provincial / State sides
Years	Team	Apps	(Points)
- Anglo-Scots
International career
Years	Team	Apps	(Points)
1975	Scotland 'B'	1	(0)
1976–83	Scotland	9	(3)

Ron Wilson (born 7 January 1954) is a former Scotland international rugby union player. His regular playing position was Fly half.

== Rugby Union career ==
=== Amateur career ===
He went to Fettes College and was described as having a 'strong and accurate kick' at fly-half.

Wilson played for and captained London Scottish.

=== Provincial career ===
He played for the Anglo-Scots district.

=== International career ===
His first and only cap for Scotland 'B' came on 18 January 1975 against France 'B'.

He had 9 full senior caps for Scotland from 1976 to 1983.
