= Ollie Campbell =

Irish rugby union player

- Born: 5 March 1954 (age 72) Dublin, Ireland
- School: Belvedere College
- Occupation: Businessman

Rugby union career
- Position: Flyhalf
Amateur team(s)
| Years | Team | Apps | (Points) |
- Old Belvedere
| – | Leinster | | |
Senior career
| Years | Team | Apps | (Points) |
- Club
International career
| Years | Team | Apps | (Points) |
| 1976–84 | Ireland | 22 | (217) |
| 1980, 1983 | British Lions | 7 | |

Seamus Oliver Campbell (born 5 March 1954) is an Irish former rugby union player. He played flyhalf for Ireland from 1976 to 1984 and represented the British Lions on two tours. He helped orchestrate Ireland's Triple Crown victory at the 1982 Five Nations Championship, breaking a drought of over 30 years. Writing in the Irish Times in 2004, Gerry Thornley described Campbell as "possibly the most complete Irish outhalf since Jackie Kyle".

Old Belvedere's sports ground on Anglesea Road in Dublin was renamed Ollie Campbell Park in his honour in 2019.

== Youth and club rugby ==
Campbell was educated at Belvedere College, a famous rugby school in Dublin, where he was on the teams that won the Leinster Schools Senior Cup in 1971 and 1972. Campbell played for Old Belvedere at club level and Leinster at provincial level, during the amateur era. While playing for Old Belvedere, he travelled to the United States in 1978, where he played in New York City against the Old Maroon Rugby Club.

== International career ==
Campbell won 22 caps for Ireland from 1976–1984, scoring 217 test points. Campbell's international career was more brief than this span suggests, as he played only four full seasons for Ireland from 1980–84. Of his career totals, he won 22 caps and scored 182 points in the Five Nations tournament. He toured twice with Ireland, to Australia in 1979 and to South Africa in 1981.

Campbell won his first cap for Ireland at the age of 21 against Australia in 1976 but did not secure another cap with Ireland until 1979. Campbell had to battle for the No.10 jersey with Tony Ward, European player of the year in 1978 and 1979. Campbell's next cap was during Ireland's 1979 tour to Australia. He set an Irish record on the 1979 tour to Australia when he scored 60 points, 19 of them in Brisbane which was an Irish record for points in a match against Australia.

The defining moment in Campbell's career came in 1982, with Campbell as the architect-in-chief of Ireland’s 1982 Triple Crown victory, Ireland's first since 1949. Ireland entered the tournament winless in its past eight matches. Campbell started the 1982 Five Nations by scoring eight points in Ireland's 20–12 win against Wales, and also playing a major hand in all three of Ireland's tries. He then scored another eight points in the following match, a 16–15 win against England. In Ireland's third match, Campbell kicked all of Ireland's 21 points (including a career-best 6 penalties) against Scotland at Lansdowne Road to secure the Triple Crown. Campbell was the leading scorer in the 1982 Five Nations with 46 points.

In the 1983 Five Nations Championship, leading Ireland to a joint Five Nations Championship shared with France. Campbell was again the tournament's leading scorer with 52 points and scored 21 points against England to set an Irish record for the most points against England in a Five Nations match. Campbell played his last match for Ireland in 1984 against Wales.

Campbell was also capped seven times for the British Lions. He earned three caps during the 1980 Lions tour to South Africa, where he was the Lions' leading scorer in the last two tests with six and five points. He earned another four caps on the 1983 Lions tour to New Zealand, where he was the Lions' leading scorer in the four test matches with 15 points. He scored 184 points in total for the Lions.

== Retirement ==
Campbell retired from rugby in 1986 following two years of struggles with hamstring injuries.

In 2007, he was presented with the Newbridge RFC Legend in Rugby Award along with the Irish Rugby Squad which won the 1982 Triple Crown and was elected an Honorary Life Member of Newbridge RFC.

Campbell has worked in the family clothing business since retirement from rugby in 1984.

== See also ==
- Ireland national rugby union team
- 1982 Five Nations Championship
