= Rodney O'Donnell =

Irish rugby union player

Rodney Christopher O'Donnell (born 16 August 1956) is a former Ireland international rugby union player. He made his Ireland debut in Australia in 1979 when Ireland won both tests (the first Northern Hemisphere side to win 2 tests in the Southern Hemisphere). He toured South Africa in 1980 with the British Lions and at the time played club rugby for St. Mary's College RFC. His rugby career was ended by a neck injury suffered on the Lions tour.
