= Charles Kent (rugby union) =

England international rugby union player

Charles Phillip Kent (4 August 1953 – 23 March 2005 (aged 51)) played rugby union for Rosslyn Park and England.

Charles Kent was born in Bridgwater in Somerset and educated at Blundell's School in Tiverton and studied medicine between 1972 and 1975 at Worcester College, Oxford. Kent won four Blues playing for Oxford including one as captain in 1974.

Kent played his early club rugby at Bridgwater & Albion rugby club, where he was an enthusiastic member until his death, and played at senior level for Rosslyn Park, appearing in the final of the John Player Cup at Twickenham in 1976 when Park lost 23–14 to Gosforth.

Kent made his England debut against Scotland in 1977. Kent scored a fine individual try against Scotland but made only four more international appearances before his medical workload saw him drop out of representative rugby. His last England appearance came as a replacement against France in 1978.

Kent, a keen squash player and horseman, collapsed and died suddenly after riding out with a group of friends on Dartmoor.

== Sources ==
- Scrum.com, Details of England Players & Officials, Extracted 4 October 2011
- About Rugby: England's Kent dies, The Daily Telegraph, 31 March 2005
