= Con Feighery =

Irish rugby union player

- Full name: Conleth Francis Patrick Feighery
- Born: 13 August 1946 (age 80) Dublin, Ireland

Rugby union career
- Position: Lock / Prop
International career
Years	Team	Apps	(Points)
1972	Ireland	3	(0)

Conleth Francis Patrick Feighery (born 13 August 1946) is an Irish professor of immunology and former rugby union international of the 1970s. He is a Fellow Emeritus at Trinity College Dublin.

Born in Dublin, Feighery was capped three times for the Ireland national rugby union team in 1972. His debut match, against France at Stade Yves-du-Manoir, was Ireland's first win in Paris for 20 years.

Feighery, a forward, played for Leinster, Lansdowne and University College Dublin.

== See also ==
- List of Ireland national rugby union players
