= Bill Gammell =

Scotland international rugby union player (born 1952)

- Born: William Benjamin Bowring Gammell; 29 December 1952 (age 73) Edinburgh, Scotland

Rugby union career
- Position: Wing
Amateur team(s)
Years	Team	Apps	(Points)
- Edinburgh Wanderers
Provincial / State sides
Years	Team	Apps	(Points)
- Edinburgh District
International career
Years	Team	Apps	(Points)
1976-77	Scotland 'B'	2	
1977-78	Scotland	5	(8)

Sir William Benjamin Bowring Gammell FRSE (born 29 December 1952) is a Scottish businessman and former Scotland international rugby union player. He attended Fettes College, where he was friends with future British Prime Minister Tony Blair, and the University of Stirling, where he obtained a BA in Economics and Accountancy.

He played for Edinburgh Wanderers and Edinburgh District before being capped by Scotland 'B' to play France 'B' in 1976 and 1977. He then was given a full senior cap for Scotland in 1977. He went on to earn five international caps in total. He scored two tries on his debut, against Ireland at Murrayfield in 1977, and played against Japan in 1977 in Tokyo when he scored four tries in the Scots' 74–9 victory.

After his rugby career was ended by injury, Gammell founded Cairn Energy in Edinburgh in 1981. Gammell's father invested in US oil company Bush-Overbey, owned by future US President George H. W. Bush. The two families became friends, with George W. Bush attending Gammell's wedding in Glasgow in 1983. Gammell was appointed Cairn's Chief Executive on its initial listing in 1988.

In the mid-1990s, he led the company in a radical reallocation of its assets, moving out of US and North Sea oil and gas concerns and into neglected fields in South Asia. The company's fortunes soared in 2004, when a field it had bought in 2001 (for $7.5 million) from Shell in the Indian province of Rajasthan was found to contain close to 1.1 billion barrels of oil, catapulting it into the FTSE 100. In 2006, Gammell founded Winning Scotland, a charity that builds confidence and resilience in young people.

In the 2006 New Year Honours list, Gammell was made a Knight Bachelor "for services to Industry in Scotland", and in 2017 he was elected a Fellow of the Royal Society of Edinburgh. Gammell received an Honorary Doctorate from Heriot-Watt University in 2007, and an Honorary Doctorate in Business Administration from Robert Gordon University in 2011.
