= Bernard Viviès =

French rugby union player (born 1955)

- Born: 3 September 1955 (age 71) Rieumes, France
- Height: 5 ft 10 in (178 cm)
- Weight: 177 lb (80 kg)

Rugby union career
- Position: Fly-half / Fullback
International career
| Years | Team | Apps | (Points) |
| 1978–83 | France | 10 | (20) |

Bernard Viviès (born 3 September 1955) is a French rugby union coach and former international.

Born in Rieumes, Viviès played mostly as a fly-half and fullback. Debuting for France in 1978, he gained 10 international caps during his career and was a member of the grand slam-winning 1981 Five Nations side. He won a French championship in 1982 with SU Agen, where he had his elder brother Christian as a teammate for three seasons.

Viviès was an assistant coach to Bernard Laporte for the national team from 2001 to 2007, serving as the backs coach.

== See also ==
- List of France national rugby union players
