= Ronnie Hakin =

Rugby union player from Northern Ireland

- Full name: Ronald Frederick Hakin
- Born: 3 September 1950 (age 76) Belfast, Northern Ireland
- Height: 6 ft 5 in (196 cm)

Rugby union career
- Position: Lock / No. 8
International career
Years	Team	Apps	(Points)
1976–77	Ireland	6	(0)

Ronald Frederick Hakin (born 3 September 1950) is a former Ireland rugby union international from Northern Ireland.

Hakin was a lock and no. 8 from Belfast, where he played for the CIYMS club. He was capped six times for Ireland from 1976 to 1977, featuring in two Five Nations campaigns and the 1976 tour of New Zealand. In the early 1980s, he competed in English rugby with Bath, during which time he represented Somerset at county level. He was on the bench in Bath's 1983–84 John Player Cup final win over Bristol. Outside of rugby, he worked as a school teacher.

== See also ==
- List of Ireland national rugby union players
