= Alistair McKibbin =

Rugby union player from Northern Ireland

- Full name: Alistair Richard McKibbin
- Born: 13 January 1958 (age 68) Belfast, Northern Ireland

Rugby union career
- Position: Centre
International career
Years	Team	Apps	(Points)
1977–80	Ireland	14	(0)

Alistair Richard McKibbin (born 13 January 1958) is a former Ireland rugby union international from Northern Ireland.

Born in Belfast, McKibbin is the son of rugby union administrator Harry McKibbin, himself a former international centre for Ireland (as well as the British Lions). McKibbin's uncle Des and elder brother Harry Jr were also capped for Ireland, making him the fourth member of the family to represent the country.

McKibbin, an Irish Schoolboys representative, made his full international debut with Ireland in the 1977 Five Nations opener, two days after his 19th birthday. He gained a total of 14 Ireland caps, as a centre.

A nephew, Roger Wilson, continued the family tradition when he was capped for Ireland in 2005.

== See also ==
- List of Ireland national rugby union players
