= Ian McIlrath =

Rugby union player from Northern Ireland

- Full name: John Alexander McIlrath
- Born: 10 March 1946 (age 80) Ballymena, Northern Ireland

Rugby union career
- Position: Centre
International career
Years	Team	Apps	(Points)
1976–77	Ireland	5	(0)

John Alexander "Ian" McIlrath (born 10 March 1946) is a former Ireland rugby union international from Northern Ireland.

Educated at Ballymena Academy, McIlrath was a Ballymena RFC centre who gained five caps for Ireland, making his debut against touring Australia at Lansdowne Road in 1976. He featured on the 1976 tour of New Zealand and made his final international appearance in the 1977 Five Nations Championship.

McIlrath was a primary school principal by profession, until his retirement in 2006. He began serving on the Irish Rugby Football Union committee in 2008 and was appointed president in 2018, replacing Philip Orr.

== See also ==
- List of Ireland national rugby union players
