= Jean-François Imbernon =

French rugby union player (born 1951)

Jean-Francois Imbernon
- Born: 17 October 1951 (age 75) Perpignan or Sahorre, France
- Height: 1.97 m (6 ft 5 1/2 in)
- Weight: 105 kg (231 lb)

Rugby union career
- Position: Lock
Amateur team(s)
Years	Team	Apps	(Points)
- USA Perpignan
International career
Years	Team	Apps	(Points)
1976-1983	France	23	(00)

Jean-François Imbernon (born October 17, 1951 in Perpignan or Sahorre, France) is a retired French international rugby union player.

He played as a Lock for USA Perpignan. He had 23 caps for France, from 1976 to 1983, without scoring. He earned his first cap with the French national team on 7 February 1976 against Ireland at Parc des Princes.

== Honours ==
- Selected to represent France, 1976–1983
- French rugby champion finalist 1977 with USA Perpignan
- Grand Slam : 1977, 1981
- Mediterranean Games 1979
