= Mike Slemen =

British Lions & England international rugby union player

- Born: Michael Anthony Charles Slemen; 11 May 1951 Liverpool, Merseyside, England
- Died: 20 July 2020 (aged 69)
- University: St Luke's College, Exeter

Rugby union career
- Position: Wing
Senior career
Years	Team	Apps	(Points)
- Liverpool
International career
Years	Team	Apps	(Points)
1976–1984	England	32	(32)
1980	British and Irish Lions		
1980	World XV		

Michael Anthony Charles Slemen (11 May 1951 – 20 July 2020) was an England international rugby union player. He toured South Africa in 1980 with the British and Irish Lions and at the time played club rugby for Liverpool.

== Early life ==
Mike Slemen was born on 11 May 1951 in Liverpool, and educated at St Edward's College, Liverpool.

== Rugby union career ==
Slemen made his international debut on 6 March 1976 at Twickenham in the England vs Ireland match. Of the 32 matches he played for his national side he was on the winning side on 15 occasions. He played his final match for England on 4 February 1984 at Murrayfield in the Scotland vs England match. He also played for a World XV on 9 August 1980 against Argentina in Buenos Aires, losing 36–22.

== Career and later life ==
He taught Physical Education (part-time) at the Merchant Taylors' School, Crosby and was also the expedition leader of the Duke of Edinburgh Award.

== Personal life ==
Slemen married to Eileen Rance in 1974. He died on 20 July 2020, aged 69.
