= Harry Steele (rugby union) =

Rugby union player from Northern Ireland

- Full name: Harold William Steele
- Born: 4 September 1948 (age 78) Cookstown, Northern Ireland

Rugby union career
- Position: Lock
International career
Years	Team	Apps	(Points)
1976–79	Ireland	10	(0)

Harold William Steele (born 4 September 1948) is a former Ireland rugby union international from Northern Ireland.

Born in Cookstown, Steele was a lock who was capped ten times for Ireland, debuting in the 1976 Five Nations. He last appeared for Ireland on the successful two-Test tour of Australia in 1979, playing in both wins.

Steele, who became a food technologist, competed for Ballymena, Queen's University, Ulster and Rainey Old Boys.

== See also ==
- List of Ireland national rugby union players
