= Mick Fitzpatrick (rugby union) =

Irish rugby union player

- Full name: Michael Patrick Fitzpatrick
- Born: 25 November 1950 (age 75) Dublin, Ireland

Rugby union career
- Position: Prop
International career
Years	Team	Apps	(Points)
1978–85	Ireland	10	(0)

Michael Patrick Fitzpatrick (born 25 November 1950) is an Irish former rugby union international.

Born in Dublin, Fitzpatrick was educated at St Paul's College, Raheny.

Fitzpatrick, a tighthead prop, won a Leinster Senior Cup title with Dublin University in 1976. He gained 10 Ireland caps from 1978 to 1985, forming a front row combination with Leinster teammates John Cantrell and Philip Orr.

== See also ==
- List of Ireland national rugby union players
