= Pat Whelan =

Irish rugby union player

- Full name: Patrick Charles Whelan
- Born: 2 May 1950 (age 76) Limerick, Ireland
- School: Crescent College
- Occupation: Property developer

Rugby union career
- Position: Hooker
International career
Years	Team	Apps	(Points)
1975–81	Ireland	19	(0)

Patrick Charles "Pa" Whelan (born 2 May 1950) is an Irish former rugby union international.

Whelan, Limerick born and raised, is a product of Crescent College and moved to Dublin for tertiary studies, where he began playing for Lansdowne. He represented Munster for the first time in 1971/72 and after returning to Limerick for business reasons began a long association with Garryowen, which he would captain to a Munster Cup title.

Succeeding Ken Kennedy as Ireland hooker in 1975, Whelan earned 19 caps over a seven-year span and although occasionally displaced from his position, had won his spot back by the time he retired with a neck injury in 1981.

Whelan is now a prominent property developer in Limerick and a rugby union administrator.

Appointed team manager of Ireland in 1995, Whelan resigned from the role unexpectedly three years later, citing personal and business reasons, but amid allegations that he had assaulted Sunday Times journalist Tom English in a Limerick sports bar. In 2016, Whelan was appointed to a three-season term as chairman for Six Nations Rugby.

== See also ==
- List of Ireland national rugby union players
