= List of Ireland national rugby union players =

List of Ireland national rugby union players is a list of men who have played for the Ireland national rugby union team.

Note the list only includes men who have played in a Test match (which includes those who played against the 1888–89 New Zealand Native football team)

- Those who represented the British and Irish Lions but were never capped for Ireland are not included - for example William Joseph Ashby was part of the first Lions team to tour South Africa in 1910 but was never capped for Ireland.
- Those who represented Ireland in matches where no caps were awarded are not included - for example James Myles represented Ireland during the 1899 Ireland rugby union tour of Canada but was never capped for Ireland.
- On 16 April 2023 the IRFU announced it had decided to award caps to 12 players who featured for Ireland but were not awarded caps at the time for games which were not then recognised as International Test Matches.

== List ==
denotes players currently active at national level. As of 21 November 2026, 1,186 men have represented Ireland.

Name	Number	Opponent	Date of debut	Caps
Robert Walkington	1	England	15/02/1875	10
Henry Lawrence Cox	2	England	15/02/1875	4
Richard J. Bell	3	England	15/02/1875	2
Abraham Cronyn	4	England	15/02/1875	3
John Thomas Myles	5	England	15/02/1875	1
Richard Galbraith	6	England	15/02/1875	3
Edward Nangle MacIlwaine	7	England	15/02/1875	2
William Stewart Allen	8	England	15/02/1875	1
Robert Maude Maginniss	9	England	15/02/1875	2
Abram Combe	10	England	15/02/1875	1
Francis Thomas Hewson	11	England	15/02/1875	1
George A. Andrews	12	England	15/02/1875	2
Edgar Galbraith	13	England	15/02/1875	1
George Stack	14	England	15/02/1875	1
William Henry Ashe	15	England	15/02/1875	3
Sandy MacDonald	16	England	15/02/1875	13
Maurice Barlow	17	England	15/02/1875	1
Henry Deans Walsh	18	England	15/02/1875	2
William Gaffikin	19	England	15/02/1875	1
Brabazon Casement	20	England	15/02/1875	3
Hamilton Moore	21	England	13/12/1875	2
Waller Hobson	22	England	13/12/1875	1
James Ireland	23	England	13/12/1875	2
William Andrew Cuscaden	24	England	13/12/1875	1
R. Greer	25	England	13/12/1875	1
Ashley John Westby	26	England	13/12/1875	1
William L. Finlay	27	England	13/12/1875	2
David Arnott	28	England	13/12/1875	1
Henry Carr Brown	29	England	05/02/1877	2
Frederick Kidd	30	England	05/02/1877	3
Augustus Mayberry Whitestone	31	England	05/02/1877	5
Thomas Gisborne Gordon	32	England	05/02/1877	3
Henry Jackson	33	England	05/02/1877	1
William Henry Wilson	34	England	05/02/1877	2
Henry Gray Edwards	35	England	05/02/1877	2
Hugh Kelly	36	England	05/02/1877	6
Thomas Dickson Brown	37	England	05/02/1877	2
William Hamilton	38	England	05/02/1877	1
George Melville Shaw	39	Scotland	19/02/1877	1
James Heron	40	Scotland	19/02/1877	2
J. Currell	41	Scotland	19/02/1877	1
Henry Walker Murray	42	Scotland	19/02/1877	3
Robert Matier	43	England	11/03/1878	2
George Fagan	44	England	11/03/1878	1
Edward Croker	45	England	11/03/1878	1
William Moore	46	England	11/03/1878	1
Frederick Schute	47	England	11/03/1878	2
Barney Hughes	48	England	11/03/1878	12
W. Griffiths	49	England	11/03/1878	1
Thomas Harrison	50	Scotland	17/02/1879	3
John Christopher Bagot	51	Scotland	17/02/1879	5
William Joshua Goulding	52	Scotland	17/02/1879	1
Ashley Cummins	53	Scotland	17/02/1879	3
Arthur Archer	54	Scotland	17/02/1879	1
John Wilgar Taylor	55	Scotland	17/02/1879	8
William Neville	56	Scotland	17/02/1879	2
George Scriven	57	Scotland	17/02/1879	8
Harrison Purdon	58	Scotland	17/02/1879	5
William Pike	59	England	24/03/1879	5
Jonathan Willington Walsh Willis	60	England	24/03/1879	1
James Bristow	61	England	24/03/1879	1
John Joseph Keon	62	England	24/03/1879	1
John Cuppaidge	63	England	24/03/1879	3
William Heron	64	England	02/02/1880	2
Meredith Johnston	65	England	02/02/1880	8
Arthur Forrest	66	England	02/02/1880	8
Francis Kennedy	67	England	02/02/1880	3
Alfred Miller	68	England	02/02/1880	3
William Wallis	69	Scotland	14/02/1880	5
William Peirce	70	England	05/02/1881	1
Harry Spunner	71	England	05/02/1881	3
David Browning	72	England	05/02/1881	2
John Burkitt	73	England	05/02/1881	1
Henry Morell	74	England	05/02/1881	4
Alfred Robinson McMullen	75	England	05/02/1881	2
Robert Edward McLean	76	Scotland	19/02/1881	10
John Johnston	77	Scotland	19/02/1881	9
Joseph Richard Atkinson	78	Wales	28/01/1882	2
Thomas St George McCarthy	79	Wales	28/01/1882	1
William Wesley Pole Fletcher	80	Wales	28/01/1882	3
Ernest Henry Greene	81	Wales	28/01/1882	4
Gerrard Charles Bent	82	Wales	28/01/1882	2
John Kennedy	83	Wales	28/01/1882	2
Edward Adye McCarthy	84	Wales	28/01/1882	1
Arthur Joseph Downing	85	Wales	28/01/1882	1
Frederick Heuston	86	Wales	28/01/1882	3
Robert George Thompson	87	Wales	28/01/1882	1
Edward Wolfe	88	England	06/02/1882	1
Robert Nelson	89	England	06/02/1882	4
Thomas Johnson-Smyth	90	England	06/02/1882	1
Olivier Sawyer Stokes	91	England	06/02/1882	2
Robert Morrow	92	Scotland	18/02/1882	10
Joe Pedlow	93	Scotland	18/02/1882	2
Alexander Charles O'Sullivan	94	Scotland	18/02/1882	1
John Buchanan	95	Scotland	18/02/1882	3
Rowland Scovell	96	England	05/02/1883	2
Isaac Peyton Warren	97	England	05/02/1883	1
Stewart Bruce	98	England	05/02/1883	3
David Francis Moore	99	England	05/02/1883	4
Henry King	100	England	05/02/1883	2
Samuel Collier	101	Scotland	17/02/1883	1
Daniel Ross	102	England	04/02/1884	5
William Higgins	103	England	04/02/1884	2
Francis John Levis	104	England	04/02/1884	1
Henry Brabazon	105	England	04/02/1884	3
William Rutherford	106	England	04/02/1884	6
John O'Sullivan	107	Scotland	16/02/1884	2
George Wheeler	108	Scotland	16/02/1884	2
Louis Maxwell McIntosh	109	Scotland	16/02/1884	1
Walter Kelly	110	Scotland	16/02/1884	1
Thomas Henry Montague Hobbs	111	Scotland	16/02/1884	2
Alexander Gordon	112	Scotland	16/02/1884	1
John Forbes Maguire	113	Scotland	16/02/1884	1
Robert Warren	114	England	07/02/1885	15
William Hallaran	115	Wales	12/03/1884	1
Alfred James Hamilton	116	Wales	12/03/1884	1
Frederick Moore	117	Wales	12/03/1884	4
William Collis	118	Wales	12/03/1884	1
Lambert Walter Moyers	119	Wales	12/03/1884	1
Walter Edgeworth-Johnstone	120	Wales	12/03/1884	1
John Fitzgerald	121	Wales	12/03/1884	1
Herbert Guy Cook	122	Wales	12/03/1884	1
Harry McDaniel	123	Wales	12/04/1884	1
Charles Jordan	124	Wales	12/04/1884	1
John Ross	125	England	07/02/1885	5
Ernest Crawford I	126	England	07/02/1885	2
Henry Neill	127	England	07/02/1885	9
Thomas Shanahan	128	England	07/02/1885	6
Thomas Ranken Lyle	129	England	07/02/1885	6
Thomas Allen	130	England	07/02/1885	2
Robert Bradshaw	131	England	07/02/1885	3
D. V. Hunter	132	Wales	07/03/1885	1
J. A. Thompson	133	Scotland	21/02/1885	2
William Hogg	134	Wales	07/03/1885	1
Joseph Chambers	135	England	06/02/1886	5
Victor Le Fanu	136	England	06/02/1886	11
Ralph Henry Massy-Westropp	137	England	06/02/1886	1
Maxwell Carpendale	138	Scotland	20/02/1886	4
Joseph F. Ross	139	Scotland	20/02/1886	1
Robert Warren Herrick	140	Scotland	20/02/1886	1
James McMordie	141	Scotland	20/02/1886	1
Henry Miller	142	Scotland	20/02/1886	1
John Waites	143	Scotland	20/02/1886	7
Frank Stoker	144	Scotland	20/02/1886	5
Dolway Walkington	145	England	05/02/1887	8
Charles Tillie	146	England	05/02/1887	4
Daniel Rambaut	147	England	05/02/1887	4
Robert Montgomery	148	England	05/02/1887	5
James McLaughlin	149	England	05/02/1887	4
John Dick	150	England	05/02/1887	3
Edward Walsh	151	England	05/02/1887	7
Robert Stevenson	152	England	05/02/1887	14
John Macauley	153	England	05/02/1887	2
Malcolm Moore	154	Scotland	19/02/1887	3
Patrick O'Connor	155	Wales	12/03/1887	1
Thomas Taggart	156	Wales	12/03/1887	1
W. Davison	157	Wales	12/03/1887	1
Robert Mayne	158	Wales	03/03/1888	2
William Ekin	159	Wales	03/03/1888	2
James Moffatt	160	Wales	03/03/1888	7
Ernest Stoker	161	Wales	03/03/1888	2
Alfred Walpole	162	Scotland	10/03/1888	2
William Morton	163	Scotland	10/03/1888	1
Thomas Edwards	164	New Zealand Natives	01/12/1888	6
David Woods	165	New Zealand Natives	01/12/1888	2
Michael Bulger	166	New Zealand Natives	01/12/1888	1
James Stevenson	167	New Zealand Natives	01/12/1888	2
Herbert Andrews	168	New Zealand Natives	01/12/1888	3
Edmund Forrest	169	New Zealand Natives	01/12/1888	13
John O'Conor	170	New Zealand Natives	01/12/1888	17
John Lytle	171	New Zealand Natives	01/12/1888	8
Joseph Jameson	172	New Zealand Natives	01/12/1888	7
Luke Holmes	173	Scotland	16/02/1889	2
Robert Yeates	174	Scotland	16/02/1889	2
Thomas Pedlow	175	Scotland	16/02/1889	2
Llewellyn Charles Nash	176	Scotland	16/02/1889	6
Charles Stack	177	Scotland	16/02/1889	1
Thomas Donovan	178	Scotland	16/02/1889	1
Robert Dunlop	179	Wales	02/03/1890	11
Alaster McDonnell	180	Wales	02/03/1890	4
John Cotton	181	Wales	02/03/1890	1
Henry Richey	182	Wales	02/03/1889	2
Henry Peter Gifford	183	Scotland	22/02/1890	1
Ralph Johnston	184	Scotland	22/02/1890	3
J. Roche	185	Scotland	22/02/1890	7
Eddie Doran	186	Scotland	22/02/1890	2
William Davis	187	Scotland	22/02/1890	9
Hugh Galbraith	188	Wales	01/03/1890	1
Benjamin Tuke	189	England	15/03/1890	9
Sam Lee	190	England	07/02/1891	19
Charles Rooke	191	England	07/02/1891	19
Herbert Wells	192	Scotland	21/02/1891	4
Edwin Cameron	193	Scotland	21/02/1891	2
Robert Stokes	194	Scotland	21/02/1891	2
George Collopy	195	Scotland	21/02/1891	2
Edward Frazer	196	Scotland	21/02/1891	2
Robert Pedlow	197	Wales	07/03/1891	1
Thomas Fogarty	198	Wales	07/03/1891	1
Thomas Peel	199	England	06/02/1892	3
William Gardiner	200	England	06/02/1892	17
Thomas Thornhill	201	England	06/02/1892	4
T. J. Johnston	202	England	06/02/1892	6
Arthur Wallis	203	England	06/02/1892	5
Robert Smith	204	England	06/02/1892	1
Frederick Davies	205	Scotland	20/02/1892	5
Andrew Clinch	206	Scotland	20/02/1892	10
Sam Gardiner	207	England	04/02/1893	2
Robert Johnston	208	England	04/02/1893	2
Harry Lindsay	209	England	04/02/1893	13
Michael Egan	210	England	04/02/1893	2
Lucius Gwynn	211	Scotland	18/02/1893	7
Walter Brown	212	Scotland	18/02/1893	5
Brian O'Brien	213	Scotland	18/02/1893	2
Herbert Forrest	214	Scotland	18/02/1893	2
William Sparrow	215	Wales	11/03/1893	2
Robert Hamilton	216	Wales	11/03/1893	1
James Lytle	217	England	03/02/1894	12
George Walmsley	218	England	03/02/1894	1
Thomas Crean	219	England	03/02/1894	9
Patrick J. Grant	220	Scotland	24/02/1894	2
Andrew Bond	221	Scotland	24/02/1894	2
G. R. Symes	222	England	02/02/1895	1
Thomas Stevenson	223	England	02/02/1895	7
Joseph Magee	224	England	02/02/1895	2
Louis Magee	225	England	02/02/1895	27
Alfred Brunker	226	England	02/02/1895	2
Hugh McCoull	227	England	02/02/1895	4
John Fulton	228	Scotland	02/03/1895	16
Alexander Montgomery	229	Scotland	02/03/1895	1
Jack O'Connor	230	Scotland	02/03/1895	1
Edward MacIlwaine	231	Scotland	02/03/1895	2
William O'Sullivan	232	Scotland	02/03/1895	1
Arthur Gwynn	233	Wales	16/03/1895	1
Michael Delany	234	Wales	16/03/1895	1
Lawrence Bulger	235	England	01/02/1896	8
Glyn Allen	236	England	01/02/1896	9
Bill Byron	237	England	01/02/1896	11
Jim Sealy	238	England	01/02/1896	9
George McAllan	239	Scotland	15/02/1896	2
John MacIlwaine	240	England	06/02/1897	7
Mick Ryan	241	England	06/02/1897	17
Jack Ryan	242	England	06/02/1897	14
Pierce O'Brien-Butler	243	Scotland	20/02/1897	6
Frank Purser	244	England	05/02/1898	3
James Franks	245	England	05/02/1898	3
John Joseph Davis	246	England	05/02/1898	2
Frederick Smithwick	247	Scotland	19/02/1898	2
Ainsworth Barr	248	Wales	19/03/1898	4
Thomas Little	249	Wales	19/03/1898	7
Ned McCarthy	250	Wales	19/03/1898	1
Ian Davidson	251	England	04/02/1899	9
George Harman	252	England	04/02/1899	2
Barney Allison	253	England	04/02/1899	12
Bill Brown	254	England	04/02/1899	1
Tom Ahearne	255	England	04/02/1899	1
Tom McGown	256	England	04/02/1899	3
Gerry Doran	257	Scotland	18/02/1899	8
Carl Reid	258	Scotland	18/02/1899	4
Edward Fitzhardinge Campbell	259	Scotland	18/02/1899	4
Arthur Meares	260	Scotland	18/02/1899	4
Cecil Moriarty	261	Wales	18/03/1899	3
John Ferris	262	England	03/02/1900	3
Samuel Irwin	263	England	03/02/1900	9
Charles Elliot Allen	264	England	03/02/1900	21
Percy Nicholson	265	England	03/02/1900	3
Jack Coffey	266	England	03/02/1900	19
Fred Gardiner	267	England	03/02/1900	22
Cecil Boyd	268	Scotland	24/02/1900	3
Bertie Doran	269	Scotland	24/02/1900	8
Thomas Arnold Harvey	270	Wales	17/03/1900	8
Arthur Freear	271	England	09/02/1901	3
Archibald Heron	272	England	09/02/1901	1
Patrick Healy	273	England	09/02/1901	10
Harry Irvine	274	Scotland	23/02/1901	1
Hugh Ferris	275	Wales	16/03/1901	1
Charles Fitzgerald	276	England	08/02/1902	3
Harry Corley	277	England	08/02/1902	8
Alfred Tedford	278	England	08/02/1902	23
George Hamlet	279	England	08/02/1902	30
John Pringle	280	Scotland	22/02/1902	2
Henry Anderson	281	England	14/02/1903	4
David Taylor	282	England	14/02/1903	1
Duncan Harvey	283	England	14/02/1903	5
Robertson Smyth	284	England	14/02/1903	3
Jos Wallace	285	Scotland	28/02/1903	10
George Bradshaw	286	Wales	14/03/1903	1
James Cecil Parke	287	England	13/02/1904	20
Campbell Robb	288	England	13/02/1904	5
Thompson Robinson	289	England	13/02/1904	10
Fred Kennedy	290	England	13/02/1904	2
Jas Wallace	291	England	13/02/1904	2
John Moffatt	292	Scotland	27/02/1904	4
Ernest Caddell	293	Scotland	27/02/1904	13
Maurice Landers	294	Wales	02/03/1904	5
Harry Thrift	295	Wales	02/03/1904	18
Henry Millar	296	Wales	02/03/1904	4
Reg Edwards	297	Wales	02/03/1904	1
Hercules Beresford-Knox	298	Wales	02/03/1904	10
Basil Maclear	299	England	11/02/1905	11
Hugh Wilson	300	England	11/02/1905	18
Harold Sugars	301	New Zealand	25/11/1905	3
George Henebrey	302	England	10/02/1906	6
Francis Casement	303	England	10/02/1906	3
William Purdon	304	England	10/02/1906	3
Michael White	305	England	10/02/1906	6
Bertie Gotto	306	South Africa	24/11/1906	1
George McIldowie	307	South Africa	24/11/1906	4
Charles Thompson	308	England	09/02/1907	13
Thomas Greeves	309	England	09/02/1907	5
Robert Forbes	310	England	09/02/1907	1
William Coogan	311	England	09/02/1907	2
James Sweeney	312	England	09/02/1907	3
Billy Hinton	313	Wales	09/03/1907	16
Frederick Harvey	314	Wales	09/03/1907	2
Gerald Beckett	315	England	08/02/1908	3
Herbert Aston	316	England	08/02/1908	2
Frank Smartt	317	England	08/02/1908	3
Tommy Smyth	318	England	08/02/1908	14
Bethel Solomons	319	England	08/02/1908	10
Thomas Harpur	320	England	08/02/1908	3
Edward Morphy	321	England	08/02/1908	1
Charles Adams	322	England	08/02/1908	16
Ernest Deane	323	England	13/02/1909	1
Godfrey Pinion	324	England	13/02/1909	4
Michael Garry	325	England	13/02/1909	7
Oliver Piper	326	England	13/02/1909	8
Dick Magrath	327	Scotland	27/02/1909	1
John Blackham	328	Scotland	27/02/1909	6
Thomas Halpin	329	Scotland	27/02/1909	13
Frederick McCormac	330	Wales	13/03/1909	3
John Joseph O'Connor	331	France	20/03/1909	1
Joseph Quinn	332	England	12/10/1910	15
Alexander Foster	333	England	12/10/1910	17
Alfred Taylor	334	England	12/10/1910	4
Dickie Lloyd	335	England	12/10/1910	19
Harry Read	336	England	12/10/1910	13
William Riordan	337	England	12/10/1910	1
Herbert Moore	338	Scotland	26/02/1910	8
Cyril O'Callaghan	339	Wales	12/03/1910	7
Robert Lyle	340	Wales	12/03/1910	2
Arthur McClinton	341	Wales	12/03/1910	2
William Smyth	342	Wales	12/03/1910	3
Charles MacIvor	343	France	28/03/1910	7
William Beatty	344	France	28/03/1910	3
William Tyrrell	345	France	28/03/1910	9
Alexander Jackson	346	England	11/02/1911	10
Sam Boyd Campbell	347	England	11/02/1911	12
James Smyth	348	England	11/02/1911	3
Michael Heffernan	349	England	11/02/1911	4
Richard Graham	350	France	01/01/1912	1
Robert Hemphill	351	France	01/01/1912	4
George McConnell	352	France	01/01/1912	4
Billy Edwards	353	France	01/01/1912	2
D'Arcy Patterson	354	France	01/01/1912	8
Myles Abraham	355	England	10/02/1912	5
George Killeen	356	England	10/02/1912	10
Robin Wright	357	Scotland	24/02/1912	1
G. S. Brown	358	Scotland	24/02/1912	3
Charles Stuart	359	South Africa	30/11/1912	1
Snipe Watson	360	South Africa	30/11/1912	1
George Holmes	361	South Africa	30/11/1912	3
John Minch	362	South Africa	30/11/1912	5
Robert Burgess	363	South Africa	30/11/1912	1
Geoffrey Schute	364	South Africa	30/11/1912	3
John Clune	365	South Africa	30/11/1912	6
Gordon Young	366	England	08/02/1913	1
James Finlay	367	England	08/02/1913	6
Ernest Jeffares	368	England	08/02/1913	2
Paddy Stokes	369	England	08/02/1913	12
J. W. McConnell	370	Scotland	22/02/1913	1
Frank Bennett	371	Scotland	22/02/1913	1
Andrew Todd	372	Wales	08/03/1913	3
George Harold Wood	373	Wales	08/03/1913	2
Albert Stewart	374	Wales	08/03/1913	3
Stanhope Polden	375	Wales	08/03/1913	4
Patrick O'Connell	376	Wales	08/03/1913	6
John Dowse	377	France	01/01/1914	3
Jack Parr	378	France	01/01/1914	4
Bill Collopy	379	France	01/01/1914	19
Frank Montgomery	380	England	14/02/1914	3
Vincent McNamara	381	England	14/02/1914	3
James Taylor	382	England	14/02/1914	3
Henry Jack	383	Scotland	28/02/1914	3
Jasper Brett	384	Wales	14/03/1914	1
Ernie Crawford	385	England	14/02/1920	30
James Dickson	386	England	14/02/1920	3
Thomas Wallace	387	England	14/02/1920	3
William John Cullen	388	England	14/02/1920	1
Arthur Horan	389	Wales	13/03/1920	2
Charles Henry Bryant	390	England	14/02/1920	2
Thomas Noel Butler	391	England	14/02/1920	1
Henry Coulter	392	England	14/02/1920	3
Robert Crichton	393	England	14/02/1920	15
William David Doherty	394	England	14/02/1920	7
William Roche	395	England	14/02/1920	3
Patrick Joseph Roddy	396	Scotland	28/02/1920	2
Basil McFarland	397	Scotland	28/02/1920	4
William Duggan	398	Scotland	28/02/1920	2
James O'Neill	399	Scotland	28/02/1920	1
Alfred Price	400	Scotland	28/02/1920	2
Tony Courtney	401	Scotland	28/02/1920	7
Bill Cunningham	402	Wales	13/03/1920	8
Michael J. Bradley	403	Wales	13/03/1920	19
Norman Potterton	404	Wales	13/03/1920	1
George Stephenson	405	France	03/04/1920	42
John Trevor Smyth	406	France	03/04/1920	1
Decco Browne	407	France	03/04/1920	1
Denis Cussen	408	England	12/02/1921	15
Henry Sneyd Tomey Cormack	409	England	12/02/1921	3
Thomas Mayne	410	England	12/02/1921	3
Tom McClelland	411	England	12/02/1921	16
John Joseph Bermingham	412	England	12/02/1921	4
Charles Hallaran	413	England	12/02/1921	15
Noel Purcell	414	England	12/02/1921	4
John Thompson	415	Wales	12/03/1921	8
Thomas Wallis	416	France	09/04/1921	5
Cecil T. Davidson	417	France	09/04/1921	1
Donal Sullivan	418	England	11/02/1922	4
Jim Wheeler	419	England	11/02/1922	5
Sam McVicker	420	England	11/02/1922	4
Reuben Owens	421	England	11/02/1922	2
Henry Stephenson	422	Scotland	25/02/1922	14
Joseph Clarke	423	Scotland	25/02/1922	7
John Egan	424	Scotland	25/02/1922	1
Ivor Popham	425	Scotland	25/02/1922	4
Joseph Gillespie	426	Wales	11/03/1922	2
Joe Stewart	427	France	08/04/1922	10
Robert McClenahan	428	England	10/02/1923	3
Finlay Jackson	429	England	10/02/1923	1
William Hall	430	England	10/02/1923	6
James Gardiner	431	England	10/02/1923	13
Dick Collopy	432	England	10/02/1923	13
Dunlop Cunningham	433	England	10/02/1923	6
Jack Mahony	434	England	10/02/1923	1
Robert Gray	435	England	10/02/1923	4
Peter Dunn	436	Scotland	24/02/1923	1
Jammie Clinch	437	Wales	10/03/1923	30
Arthur Douglas	438	France	14/04/1923	5
Alfred Atkins	439	France	26/01/1924	1
John McDowell	440	France	26/01/1924	2
Jim McVicker	441	France	26/01/1924	20
Bob Collis	442	France	26/01/1924	7
I. M. B. Stuart	443	England	09/02/1924	2
Tom Hewitt	444	Wales	08/03/1924	9
Frank Hewitt	445	Wales	08/03/1924	9
Alex Spain	446	New Zealand	01/11/1924	1
Norman Brand	447	New Zealand	01/11/1924	1
Mark Sugden	448	France	01/01/1925	28
William F. Browne	449	England	28/02/1925	12
George Beamish	450	England	28/02/1925	25
Terence Millin	451	Wales	14/03/1925	1
Eugene Davy	452	Wales	14/03/1925	34
Standish Cagney	453	Wales	14/03/1925	13
Robert Flood	454	Wales	14/03/1925	1
Rex Hamilton	455	France	23/01/1926	1
Joseph Neill	456	France	23/01/1926	1
Jimmy Farrell	457	France	23/01/1926	29
Allan Buchanan	458	England	13/02/1926	6
Charles Payne	459	England	13/02/1926	16
Jack Gage	460	Scotland	27/02/1926	4
Charles Hanrahan	461	Scotland	27/02/1926	20
Maurice Atkinson	462	France	01/01/1927	2
Jim Ganly	463	France	01/01/1927	12
Paul Murray	464	France	01/01/1927	19
Norman Ross	465	France	01/01/1927	2
Hugh McVicker	466	England’	12/02/1927	5
Theodore Pike	467	England	12/02/1927	8
Reginald Odbert	468	France	28/01/1928	1
Jack Arigho	469	France	28/01/1928	16
Thomas Bramwell	470	France	28/01/1928	1
Rowland Byers	471	Scotland	25/02/1928	5
Jerry Mullane	472	Wales	01/03/1928	2
Mike Dunne	473	France	31/12/1928	16
Hugh Browne	474	England	09/02/1929	3
John Synge	475	Scotland	23/02/1929	1
Morgan Crowe	476	Wales	09/03/1929	13
Mark Deering	477	Wales	09/02/1929	1
Edward de Vere Hunt	478	France	25/01/1930	5
Claude Carroll	479	France	25/01/1930	1
Frederick Williamson	480	England	08/02/1930	3
Henry O'Hara O'Neill	481	England	08/02/1930	6
Noel F. Murphy	482	England	08/02/1930	11
William John McCormick	483	England	08/02/1930	1
Ter Casey	484	Scotland	22/02/1930	2
Major Egan	485	France	01/01/1931	3
Ned Lightfoot	486	France	01/01/1931	11
Hal Withers	487	France	01/01/1931	5
Jack Siggins	488	France	01/01/1931	24
Jack Russell	489	France	01/01/1931	19
Laurence McMahon	490	England	14/02/1931	12
Victor Pike	491	England	14/02/1931	13
John Entrican	492	Scotland	28/02/1931	1
Dermot Morris	493	Wales	14/03/1931	6
Shaun Waide	494	England	13/02/1932	1
Danaher Sheehan	495	England	13/02/1932	1
Billy Ross	496	England	13/02/1932	9
Ernest Ridgeway	497	Scotland	27/02/1932	5
Robin Pratt	498	England	11/02/1933	5
Robert Barnes	499	Wales	11/03/1933	1
Charles Beamish	500	Wales	11/03/1933	12
Paddy Coote	501	Scotland	01/04/1933	1
Joseph O'Connor	502	Scotland	01/04/1933	11
James Rearden	503	England	10/02/1934	2
Mebs Bardon	504	England	10/02/1934	1
Sam Walker	505	England	10/02/1934	15
George J. Morgan	506	England	10/02/1934	19
Bob Graves	507	England	10/02/1934	15
David Lane	508	Scotland	24/02/1934	4
Ham Lambert	509	Scotland	24/02/1934	2
John Reid	510	Scotland	24/02/1934	2
Daniel Langan	511	Wales	10/03/1934	1
Aidan Bailey	512	Wales	10/03/1934	13
Noel McGrath	513	Wales	10/03/1934	1
John Megaw	514	Wales	10/03/1934	2
Phil Crowe	515	England	09/02/1935	2
Seamus Deering	516	England	09/02/1935	9
Mike Sayers	517	England	09/02/1935	10
Patrick Lawlor	518	England	09/02/1935	6
Victor Hewitt	519	Scotland	23/02/1935	6
Jack Doyle	520	Wales	09/03/1935	1
Vesey Boyle	521	New Zealand	07/12/1935	9
Leslie Malcolmson	522	New Zealand	07/12/1935	7
Thomas Dunn	523	New Zealand	07/12/1935	1
Clive Wallis	524	New Zealand	07/12/1935	1
Freddie Moran	525	England	08/02/1936	9
Robert Alexander	526	England	08/02/1936	11
George Cromey	527	England	13/02/1937	9
Thomas Corken	528	England	13/02/1937	3
Ted Ryan	529	Wales	03/04/1937	3
Charles Reidy	530	Wales	03/04/1937	1
Paddy Mayne	531	Wales	03/04/1937	6
Maurice Daly	532	England	12/02/1938	1
Victor Lyttle	533	England	12/02/1938	3
David O'Loughlin	534	England	12/02/1938	6
Sinclair Irwin	535	England	12/02/1938	5
Ronnie Craig	536	Scotland	26/02/1938	2
Hector Kennedy	537	Scotland	26/02/1938	2
Denis Tierney	538	Scotland	26/02/1938	3
Harry McKibbin	539	Wales	12/03/1938	4
Des Torrens	540	Wales	12/03/1938	4
Con Murphy	541	England	11/02/1939	5
Charles Teehan	542	England	11/02/1939	3
James G. Ryan	543	England	11/02/1939	3
Tommy Headon	544	Scotland	25/02/1939	2
Brendan Quinn	545	France	25/01/1947	1
Kevin Quinn	546	France	25/01/1947	5
Johnny Harper	547	France	25/01/1947	3
Barney Mullan	548	France	25/01/1947	8
Jack Kyle	549	France	25/01/1947	46
Ray Carroll	550	France	25/01/1947	3
Matthew Neely	551	France	25/01/1947	4
Karl Mullen	552	France	25/01/1947	25
John Daly	553	France	25/01/1947	7
Colm Callan	554	France	25/01/1947	10
Ernie Keeffe	555	France	25/01/1947	6
Bill McKay	556	France	25/01/1947	23
Bob Agar	557	France	25/01/1947	10
Don Hingerty	558	France	25/01/1947	4
Bertie O'Hanlon	559	England	08/02/1947	12
Deryck Monteith	560	England	08/02/1947	3
Ernest Strathdee	561	England	08/02/1947	9
Dudley Higgins	562	Scotland	22/02/1947	6
Mick Lane	563	Wales	29/03/1947	17
Des McKee	564	Australia	06/12/1947	12
Paddy Reid	565	Australia	06/12/1947	4
Kevin O'Flanagan	566	Australia	06/12/1947	1
Jimmy Corcoran	567	Australia	06/12/1947	2
Albert McConnell	568	Australia	06/12/1947	7
Dick Wilkinson	569	Australia	06/12/1947	1
Jimmy Nelson	570	Australia	06/12/1947	16
Desmond McCourt	571	Australia	06/12/1947	1
Jim McCarthy	572	France	01/01/1948	28
Jack Mattsson	573	England	14/02/1948	1
Hugh de Lacy	574	England	14/02/1948	2
Des O'Brien	575	England	14/02/1948	20
Mick O'Flanagan	576	Scotland	28/02/1948	1
George Norton	577	France	29/01/1949	11
Tom Gavin	578	France	29/01/1949	2
Tom Cullen	579	France	29/01/1949	1
Tom Clifford	580	France	29/01/1949	14
Noel Henderson	581	Scotland	26/02/1949	40
Leslie Griffin	582	Scotland	26/02/1949	2
John Burgess	583	France	28/01/1950	2
Des McKibbin	584	France	28/01/1950	8
Arthur Curtis	585	France	28/01/1950	3
George Phipps	586	England	11/02/1950	5
Louis Crowe	587	England	11/02/1950	3
Hex Uprichard	588	Scotland	25/02/1950	2
John Blayney	589	Scotland	25/02/1950	1
Jack Molony	590	Scotland	25/02/1950	1
Cornelius Griffin	591	France	27/01/1951	2
Richard Chambers	592	France	27/01/1951	6
Johnny O'Meara	593	France	27/01/1951	22
John Smith	594	England	10/02/1951	12
Harry Millar	595	England	10/02/1951	5
Paddy Lawlor	596	Scotland	24/02/1951	12
Jim Brady	597	Scotland	24/02/1951	12
Aengus McMorrow	598	Wales	10/03/1951	1
Gerry Murphy	599	South Africa	08/12/1951	6
Tony Browne	600	South Africa	08/12/1951	1
Robin Thompson	601	South Africa	08/12/1951	11
Jack Notley	602	France	26/01/1952	2
Archie O'Leary	603	Scotland	23/02/1953	3
Michael Dargan	604	Scotland	23/02/1953	2
Mick Hillary	605	England	29/03/1952	1
Niall Bailey	606	England	29/03/1952	1
William O'Neill	607	England	29/03/1952	6
Robin Roe	608	England	29/03/1952	21
Patrick Kavanagh	609	England	29/03/1952	2
Robin Gregg	610	France	24/01/1953	7
Maurice Mortell	611	France	24/01/1953	9
Fuzzy Anderson	612	France	24/01/1953	13
Ewart Bell	613	France	24/01/1953	4
Ronnie Kavanagh	614	France	24/01/1953	35
Tom Reid	615	England	14/02/1953	13
Seamus Byrne	616	Scotland	28/02/1953	3
Alexander Cecil Pedlow	617	Wales	13/03/1954	30
Gerald Reidy	618	Wales	13/03/1954	5
Joe Gaston	619	New Zealand	09/01/1954	8
John Hewitt	620	England	13/02/1954	4
Gordon Wood	621	England	13/02/1954	29
Jim Murphy-O'Connor	622	England	13/02/1954	1
Robin Godfrey	623	Scotland	27/02/1954	2
Seamus Kelly	624	Scotland	27/02/1954	5
Paddy Berkery	625	Wales	13/03/1954	11
Herbie McCracken	626	Wales	13/03/1954	1
Bill Tector	627	France	22/01/1955	3
Tony O'Reilly	628	France	22/01/1955	29
Paddy O'Donoghue	629	France	22/01/1955	11
Bill O'Connell	630	France	22/01/1955	1
Marney Cunningham	631	France	22/01/1955	7
Dickie Roche	632	England	12/02/1955	4
Mick Madden	633	England	12/02/1955	3
Sean McDermott	634	Scotland	26/02/1955	2
Dave MacSweeney	635	France	22/01/1955	1
George Ross	636	Wales	12/03/1955	1
James McKelvey	637	France	28/01/1956	2
Sean Quinlan	638	France	28/01/1956	4
Andy Mulligan	639	France	28/01/1956	22
Cecil Fagan	640	France	28/01/1956	3
Adrian Kennedy	641	France	28/01/1956	1
Jim Ritchie	642	France	28/01/1956	2
Noel Feddis	643	England	11/02/1956	1
Brendan Guerin	644	Scotland	25/02/1956	1
Leo Lynch	645	Scotland	25/02/1956	1
Charlie Lydon	646	Scotland	25/02/1956	1
Timothy McGrath	647	Wales	10/03/1956	7
Niall Brophy	648	France	26/01/1957	20
Hubert O'Connor	649	France	26/01/1957	4
Tony O'Sullivan	650	France	26/01/1957	15
Jim Brennan	651	Scotland	23/02/1957	2
David Hewitt	652	Australia	18/01/1958	18
Ronnie Dawson	653	Australia	18/01/1958	27
James B. Stevenson	654	Australia	18/01/1958	5
Bill Mulcahy	655	Australia	18/01/1958	35
Jim Donaldson	656	Australia	18/01/1958	4
Noel A. A. Murphy	657	Australia	18/01/1958	41
Mick English	658	Wales	15/03/1958	16
Dion Glass	659	France	19/04/1958	4
Syd Millar	660	France	19/04/1958	37
Eric Brown	661	France	19/04/1958	1
Johnny Dooley	662	England	14/02/1959	3
Gerry Culliton	663	England	14/02/1959	19
Kevin Flynn	664	France	18/04/1959	22
Tom Kiernan	665	England	13/02/1960	54
Wally Bornemann	666	England	13/02/1960	4
Barton McCallan	667	England	13/02/1960	2
Jerry Walsh	668	Scotland	27/02/1960	26
Locky Butler	669	Wales	12/03/1960	1
Paddy Costello	670	France	09/04/1960	1
Ken Armstrong	671	South Africa	17/12/1960	2
Ron McCarten	672	England	11/02/1961	3
Jonathan Moffett	673	England	11/02/1961	2
Ian Dick	674	Wales	11/03/1961	8
Tom Nesdale	675	France	15/04/1961	1
Dennis Scott	676	France	15/04/1961	3
Kenneth Houston	677	South Africa	13/05/1961	6
Larry L'Estrange	678	England	10/02/1962	1
Ray Hunter	679	England	10/02/1962	10
Gerry Gilpin	680	England	10/02/1962	3
John Quirke	681	England	10/02/1962	3
Jimmy Dick	682	England	10/02/1962	1
Ray McLoughlin	683	England	10/02/1962	40
Willie John McBride	684	England	10/02/1962	63
Noel Turley	685	England	10/02/1962	1
Mike Hipwell	686	England	10/02/1962	12
Gerry Hardy	687	Scotland	24/02/1962	1
Frank Byrne	688	France	14/04/1962	1
Jimmy Kelly	689	France	14/04/1962	11
Mick O'Callaghan	690	Wales	17/11/1962	3
Patrick Dwyer	691	Wales	17/11/1962	5
Dave Kiely	692	Wales	17/11/1962	5
Patrick Casey	693	France	26/01/1963	12
John Murray	694	France	26/01/1963	1
Brian Marshall	695	England	09/02/1963	1
Eamonn McGuire	696	England	09/02/1963	8
Johnny Fortune	697	New Zealand	07/12/1963	2
Alan Duggan	698	New Zealand	07/12/1963	25
Mike Gibson	699	England	08/02/1964	69
Fergus Keogh	700	Wales	07/03/1964	2
Paddy Lane	701	Wales	07/03/1964	1
Al Moroney	702	Wales	07/03/1964	3
Mick Leahy	703	Wales	07/03/1964	1
Roger Young	704	France	23/01/1965	26
Seán MacHale	705	France	23/01/1965	12
Ken Kennedy	706	France	23/01/1965	45
Mick Doyle	707	France	23/01/1965	20
Ronnie Lamont	708	France	23/01/1965	12
Paddy McGrath	709	England	13/02/1965	10
Henry Wall	710	Scotland	27/02/1965	2
Mick Molloy	711	France	29/01/1966	27
Barry Bresnihan	712	England	12/02/1966	25
Aidan Brady	713	Scotland	26/02/1966	4
Ollie Waldron	714	Scotland	26/02/1966	3
Harry Rea	715	Australia	21/01/1967	2
Brendan Sherry	716	Australia	21/01/1967	6
Phil O'Callaghan	717	Australia	21/01/1967	21
Ken Goodall	718	Australia	21/01/1967	19
Des Scott	719	England	11/02/1967	5
Sam Hutton	720	Scotland	25/02/1967	4
Terry Moore	721	Australia	13/05/1967	12
Brian O'Brien	722	France	27/01/1968	3
Billy McCombe	723	France	27/01/1968	5
Tom Doyle	724	England	10/02/1968	3
Lawrence Hunter	725	Wales	09/03/1968	2
John Moroney	726	Wales	09/03/1968	6
Jim Tydings	727	Australia	26/10/1968	1
Barry McGann	728	France	25/01/1969	25
Jimmy Davidson	729	France	25/01/1969	6
Colin Grimshaw	730	England	08/02/1969	1
Bill Brown	731	South Africa	10/01/1970	4
Eric Campbell	732	South Africa	10/01/1970	1
Fergus Slattery	733	South Africa	10/01/1970	61
Eddie Grant	734	France	30/01/1971	4
Sean Lynch	735	France	30/01/1971	17
Dennis Hickie	736	France	30/01/1971	6
Barry O'Driscoll	737	France	30/01/1971	4
Tom Grace	738	France	29/01/1972	25
Wallace McMaster	739	France	29/01/1972	18
John Moloney	740	France	29/01/1972	27
Con Feighery	741	France	29/01/1972	3
Stewart McKinney	742	France	29/01/1972	25
Kevin Mays	743	New Zealand	20/01/1973	4
Richard Milliken	744	England	10/02/1973	14
Jim Buckley	745	England	10/02/1973	2
Tony Ensor	746	Wales	10/03/1973	2
Seamus Dennison	747	France	14/04/1973	3
Mick Quinn	748	France	14/04/1973	10
Roger Clegg	749	France	14/04/1973	5
Vincent Becker	750	France	19/01/1974	2
Moss Keane	751	France	19/01/1974	51
Paddy Agnew	752	France	19/01/1974	2
Pat Lavery	753	Wales	02/02/1974	2
Shay Deering	754	Wales	02/02/1974	8
Alan Doherty	755	Presidents XV	07/09/1974	1
James Crowe	756	New Zealand	23/11/1974	1
Patrick Parfrey	757	New Zealand	23/11/1974	1
Pat Whelan	758	England	18/01/1975	19
Willie Duggan	759	England	18/01/1975	41
Mick Sherry	760	France	01/03/1975	2
Ian McIlrath	761	Australia	17/01/1976	5
Ollie Campbell	762	Australia	17/01/1976	22
John Robbie	763	Australia	17/01/1976	9
John Cantrell	764	Australia	17/01/1976	9
Feidlim McLoughlin	765	Australia	17/01/1976	1
Philip Orr	766	France	07/02/1976	58
Brendan Foley	767	France	07/02/1976	11
Donal Canniffe	768	Wales	21/02/1976	2
Ronnie Hakin	769	Wales	21/02/1976	6
Larry Moloney	770	Wales	21/02/1976	4
Joe Brady	771	England	06/03/1976	2
Stephen Blake-Knox	772	England	06/03/1976	3
Harry Steele	773	England	06/03/1976	10
Harry McKibbin	774	Scotland	20/03/1976	1
Frank Wilson	775	Wales	15/01/1977	3
Alistair McKibbin	776	Wales	15/01/1977	14
Jimmy Bowen	777	Wales	15/01/1977	3
Robbie McGrath	778	Wales	15/01/1977	16
Tom Feighery	779	Wales	15/01/1977	2
Ned Byrne	780	Scotland	19/02/1977	6
Charlie Murtagh	781	Scotland	19/02/1977	1
Ray Finn	782	France	19/03/1977	1
Freddie McLennan	783	France	19/03/1977	18
Paul McNaughton	784	Scotland	21/01/1978	15
Tony Ward	785	Scotland	21/01/1978	20
Mick Fitzpatrick	786	Scotland	21/01/1978	10
Donal Spring	787	Scotland	21/01/1978	7
John O'Driscoll	788	Scotland	21/01/1978	32
Terry Kennedy	789	New Zealand	04/11/1978	13
Colin Patterson	790	New Zealand	04/11/1978	11
Dick Spring	791	France	20/01/1979	3
Gerry McLoughlin	792	France	20/01/1979	18
Colm Tucker	793	France	20/01/1979	3
Michael E. Gibson	794	France	20/01/1979	10
Moss Finn	795	England	17/02/1979	14
Ronnie Elliott	796	Scotland	03/03/1979	1
Rodney O'Donnell	797	Australia	03/06/1979	5
Ciaran Fitzgerald	798	Australia	03/06/1979	25
Frank Ennis	799	Australia	03/06/1979	1
Kevin O'Brien	800	England	19/01/1980	3
Jim Glennon	801	England	19/01/1980	7
Ian Burns	802	England	19/01/1980	1
David Irwin	803	France	01/03/1980	25
Hugo MacNeill	804	France	07/02/1981	37
Frank Quinn	805	France	07/02/1981	3
Kenny Hooks	806	Scotland	21/03/1981	6
John J. Murphy	807	South Africa	30/05/1981	3
Paul Dean	808	South Africa	30/05/1981	32
Jerry Holland	809	South Africa	30/05/1981	3
John A. Hewitt	810	South Africa	30/05/1981	2
Trevor Ringland	811	Australia	21/11/1981	34
Donal Lenihan	812	Australia	21/11/1981	52
Mike Kiernan	813	Wales	23/01/1982	43
Keith Crossan	814	Scotland	20/02/1982	41
Ronan Kearney	815	France	20/03/1982	4
Rory Moroney	816	France	21/01/1984	3
J. J. McCoy	817	Wales	04/02/1984	16
Willie Duncan	818	Wales	04/02/1984	2
Harry Harbison	819	Wales	04/02/1984	8
Tony Doyle	820	England	18/02/1984	2
Des Fitzgerald	821	England	18/02/1984	34
Derek McGrath	822	Scotland	03/03/1984	5
Hugh Condon	823	Scotland	03/03/1984	1
Brendan Mullin	824	Australia	10/11/1984	56
Michael T. Bradley	825	Australia	10/11/1984	40
Willie Anderson	826	Australia	10/11/1984	27
Phillip Matthews	827	Australia	10/11/1984	38
Willie Sexton	828	Australia	10/11/1984	3
Brian Spillane	829	Scotland	02/02/1985	13
Nigel Carr	830	Scotland	02/02/1985	11
Brian McCall	831	France	02/03/1985	3
David Morrow	832	France	01/02/1986	3
Paul Kennedy	833	Wales	15/02/1986	2
Ralph Keyes	834	England	01/03/1986	8
Terry Kingston	835	Wales	25/05/1987	30
John MacDonald	836	Canada	30/05/1987	4
Paul Collins	837	Canada	30/05/1987	2
Job Langbroek	838	Tonga	03/06/1987	1
Neil Francis	839	Tonga	03/06/1987	36
Phil Danaher	840	Scotland	16/01/1988	28
John Fitzgerald	841	Scotland	16/01/1988	12
Don Whittle	842	France	20/02/1988	1
Tom Clancy	843	Wales	05/03/1988	9
Denis McBride	844	Wales	05/03/1988	32
Mick Moylett	845	England	19/03/1988	1
John F. Sexton	846	England	23/04/1988	4
Vince Cunningham	847	England	23/04/1988	16
Fergus Aherne	848	England	23/04/1988	16
Steve Smith	849	England	23/04/1988	25
Noel Mannion	850	Samoa	29/10/1988	16
Pat O'Hara	851	Samoa	29/10/1988	15
Fergus Dunlea	852	Wales	04/02/1989	3
Paul Haycock	853	England	18/02/1989	1
Philip Rainey	854	England	18/02/1989	1
Nick Popplewell	855	New Zealand	18/11/1989	48
Brian Smith	856	New Zealand	18/11/1989	9
Kenny Murphy	857	England	20/01/1990	11
Peter Russell	858	England	20/01/1990	4
Gary Halpin	859	England	20/01/1990	11
Alain Rolland	860	Argentina	27/10/1990	3
Paddy Johns	861	Argentina	27/10/1990	59
Philip Lawlor	862	Argentina	27/10/1990	3
Simon Geoghegan	863	France	02/02/1991	37
Rob Saunders	864	France	02/02/1991	12
Brian Rigney	865	France	02/02/1991	8
Mick Galwey	866	France	02/02/1991	41
Brian Robinson	867	France	02/02/1991	25
Gordon Hamilton	868	France	02/02/1991	10
Jim Staples	869	Wales	16/02/1991	26
David Curtis	870	Wales	16/02/1991	13
Jack Clarke	871	Wales	16/02/1991	29
Richard Wallace	872	Namibia	20/07/1991	29
Nicky Barry	873	Namibia	27/07/1991	1
Mick Fitzgibbon	874	Wales	18/01/1992	6
Derek McAleese	875	France	21/03/1992	1
Paul Hogan	876	France	21/03/1992	1
Ronald Carey	877	New Zealand	30/05/1992	2
Neville Furlong	878	New Zealand	30/05/1992	2
Paul McCarthy	879	New Zealand	30/05/1992	5
Kelvin Leahy	880	New Zealand	30/05/1992	1
Mark McCall	881	New Zealand	30/05/1992	13
Paddy Kenny	882	New Zealand	06/06/1992	1
John N. Murphy	883	Australia	31/10/1992	1
Colin Wilkinson	884	Scotland	16/01/1993	1
Niall Malone	885	Scotland	16/01/1993	3
Richard Costello	886	Scotland	16/01/1993	1
Ciaran Clarke	887	France	20/02/1993	5
Peter Clohessy	888	France	20/02/1993	54
Brian Glennon	889	France	20/02/1993	1
Eric Elwood	890	Wales	06/03/1993	35
Conor O'Shea	891	Romania	13/11/1993	35
Ken O'Connell	892	France	15/01/1994	2
Maurice Field	893	England	19/02/1994	17
Jonny Bell	894	Australia	05/06/1994	36
Niall Woods	895	Australia	05/06/1994	8
Keith Wood	896	Australia	05/06/1994	58
David Corkery	897	Australia	05/06/1994	27
Gabriel Fulcher	898	Australia	11/06/1994	20
Alan McGowan	899	USA	05/11/1994	1
Paul Burke	900	England	21/01/1995	13
Niall Hogan	901	England	21/01/1995	13
Anthony Foley	902	England	21/01/1995	62
Ben Cronin	903	Scotland	04/02/1995	2
Davy Tweed	904	France	04/03/1995	4
Eddie Halvey	905	France	04/03/1995	8
Darragh O'Mahony	906	Italy	06/05/1995	4
David O'Mahony	907	Italy	06/05/1995	1
Paul Wallace	908	Japan	31/05/1995	45
Chris Saverimutto	909	Fiji	18/11/1995	3
Jeremy Davidson	910	Fiji	18/11/1995	32
Allen Clarke	911	Fiji	18/11/1995	8
Sean McCahill	912	Fiji	18/11/1995	1
Henry Hurley	913	Fiji	18/11/1995	2
Kurt McQuilkin	914	USA	06/01/1996	5
Victor Costello	915	USA	06/01/1996	39
David Humphreys	916	France	17/02/1996	72
Simon Mason	917	Wales	02/03/1996	3
Rob Henderson	918	Western Samoa	12/11/1996	32
James Topping	919	Western Samoa	12/11/1996	8
Dominic Crotty	920	Australia	23/11/1996	5
Stephen McIvor	921	Australia	23/11/1996	3
Eric Miller	922	Italy	04/01/1997	48
Denis Hickie	923	Wales	01/02/1997	62
Ross Nesdale	924	Wales	01/02/1997	13
Brian O'Meara	925	England	15/02/1997	9
Paul Flavin	926	Scotland	01/03/1997	2
Kevin Nowlan	927	New Zealand	15/11/1997	3
John McWeeney	928	New Zealand	15/11/1997	1
Conor McGuinness	929	New Zealand	15/11/1997	14
Malcolm O'Kelly	930	New Zealand	15/11/1997	92
Kieron Dawson	931	New Zealand	15/11/1997	21
David Erskine	932	New Zealand	15/11/1997	15
Kevin Maggs	933	New Zealand	15/11/1997	70
Reggie Corrigan	934	Canada	30/11/1997	47
Dylan O'Grady	935	Italy	20/12/1997	1
Andy Ward	936	France	07/03/1998	28
Killian Keane	937	England	04/04/1998	1
Justin Bishop	938	South Africa	13/06/1998	25
Justin Fitzpatrick	939	South Africa	13/06/1998	26
Dion O'Cuinneagain	940	South Africa	13/06/1998	19
Trevor Brennan	941	South Africa	13/06/1998	13
Pat Duignan	942	Georgia	14/11/1998	2
Girvan Dempsey	943	Georgia	14/11/1998	82
Ciaran Scally	944	Georgia	14/11/1998	4
Brian O'Driscoll	945	Australia	12/06/1999	133
Matt Mostyn	946	Australia	12/06/1999	6
Tom Tierney	947	Australia	12/06/1999	8
Mike Mullins	948	Argentina	28/08/1999	16
Angus McKeen	949	Romania	15/10/1999	1
Gordon D'Arcy	950	Romania	15/10/1999	82
Alan Quinlan	951	Romania	15/10/1999	27
Bob Casey	952	England	05/02/2000	7
Shane Horgan	953	Scotland	19/02/2000	65
Ronan O'Gara	954	Scotland	19/02/2000	128
Peter Stringer	955	Scotland	19/02/2000	98
Simon Easterby	956	Scotland	19/02/2000	65
John Hayes	957	Scotland	19/02/2000	105
Peter McKenna	958	Argentina	03/06/2000	1
Geordan Murphy	959	USA	10/06/2000	72
Guy Easterby	960	USA	10/06/2000	28
Frankie Sheahan	961	USA	10/06/2000	29
David Wallace	962	USA	10/06/2000	72
Marcus Horan	963	USA	10/06/2000	67
Tyrone Howe	964	Japan	11/11/2000	14
Gary Longwell	965	Japan	11/11/2000	26
Emmet Byrne	966	Italy	03/02/2001	8
Shane Byrne	967	Romania	02/06/2001	41
Mick O'Driscoll	968	Romania	02/06/2001	23
Jeremy Staunton	969	Samoa	11/11/2001	5
Paul O'Connell	970	Wales	03/02/2002	108
Keith Gleeson	971	Wales	03/02/2002	27
John Kelly	972	Italy	23/03/2002	17
Leo Cullen	973	New Zealand	22/06/2002	32
Donncha O'Callaghan	974	Wales	22/03/2003	94
Mark McHugh	975	Tonga	14/06/2003	1
Simon Best	976	Tonga	14/06/2003	23
Anthony Horgan	977	Samoa	20/06/2003	7
Aidan McCullen	978	Samoa	20/06/2003	1
Paul Shields	979	Samoa	20/06/2003	2
Gavin Duffy	980	South Africa	19/06/2004	10
Johnny O'Connor	981	South Africa	13/11/2004	12
Tommy Bowe	982	USA	20/11/2004	69
Denis Leamy	983	USA	20/11/2004	57
Matt McCullough	984	Japan	12/06/2005	4
Roger Wilson	985	Japan	12/06/2005	1
Kieran Campbell	986	Japan	12/06/2005	3
Trevor Hogan	987	Japan	12/06/2005	14
Bernard Jackman	988	Japan	12/06/2005	9
David Quinlan	989	Japan	12/06/2005	2
Kieran Lewis	990	Japan	19/06/2005	3
Neil Best	991	New Zealand	12/11/2005	18
Rory Best	992	New Zealand	12/11/2005	123
Andrew Trimble	993	Australia	19/11/2005	70
Jerry Flannery	994	Romania	26/11/2005	41
Eoin Reddan	995	France	11/02/2006	71
Isaac Boss	996	New Zealand	17/06/2006	22
Bryan Young	997	New Zealand	17/06/2006	8
Paddy Wallace	998	South Africa	11/11/2006	30
Stephen Ferris	999	Pacific Islands	26/11/2006	35
Luke Fitzgerald	1000	Pacific Islands	26/11/2006	34
Jamie Heaslip	1001	Pacific Islands	26/11/2006	95
Brian Carney	1002	Argentina	26/05/2007	4
Tony Buckley	1003	Argentina	26/05/2007	25
Barry Murphy	1004	Argentina	02/06/2007	4
Tomás O'Leary	1005	Argentina	26/05/2007	24
Shane Jennings	1006	Argentina	02/06/2007	13
Rob Kearney	1007	Argentina	02/06/2007	95
Keith Earls	1008	Canada	08/11/2008	101
Donnacha Ryan	1009	Argentina	22/11/2008	47
Tom Court	1010	Italy	15/02/2009	32
Darren Cave	1011	Canada	23/05/2009	11
Ian Dowling	1012	Canada	23/05/2009	2
Ian Keatley	1013	Canada	23/05/2009	7
John Muldoon	1014	Canada	23/05/2009	3
Niall Ronan	1015	Canada	23/05/2009	4
Ian Whitten	1016	Canada	23/05/2009	2
Ryan Caldwell	1017	Canada	23/05/2009	2
Mike Ross	1018	Canada	23/05/2009	61
Denis Hurley	1019	USA	31/05/2009	1
Cian Healy	1020	Australia	15/11/2009	137
Johnny Sexton	1021	Fiji	21/11/2009	118
Seán Cronin	1022	Fiji	21/11/2009	72
Seán O'Brien	1023	Fiji	21/11/2009	56
Kevin McLaughlin	1024	Italy	06/02/2010	8
John Fogarty	1025	New Zealand	12/06/2010	1
Dan Tuohy	1026	New Zealand	12/06/2010	11
Chris Henry	1027	Australia	26/06/2010	24
Rhys Ruddock	1028	Australia	26/06/2010	27
Damien Varley	1029	Australia	26/06/2010	3
Devin Toner	1030	Samoa	13/11/2010	70
Fergus McFadden	1031	Italy	05/02/2011	34
Mike McCarthy	1032	Scotland	06/08/2011	19
Felix Jones	1033	Scotland	06/08/2011	13
Conor Murray	1034	France	14/08/2011	125
Peter O'Mahony	1035	Italy	25/02/2012	114
Declan Fitzpatrick	1036	New Zealand	09/06/2012	7
Simon Zebo	1037	New Zealand	09/06/2012	35
Ronan Loughney	1038	New Zealand	09/06/2012	1
Richardt Strauss	1039	South Africa	10/11/2012	17
Michael Bent	1040	South Africa	10/11/2012	4
Iain Henderson	1041	South Africa	10/11/2012	86
Dave Kilcoyne	1042	South Africa	10/11/2012	56
Craig Gilroy	1043	Argentina	24/11/2012	10
Paddy Jackson	1044	Scotland	24/02/2013	25
Luke Marshall	1045	Scotland	24/02/2013	11
Ian Madigan	1046	France	09/03/2013	30
Stephen Archer	1047	Italy	16/03/2013	2
Paul Marshall	1048	Italy	16/03/2013	3
Robbie Henshaw	1049	USA	08/06/2013	87
Stuart Olding	1050	USA	08/06/2013	4
Jamie Hagan	1051	USA	08/06/2013	1
Tommy O'Donnell	1052	USA	08/06/2013	13
Mike Sherry	1053	USA	08/06/2013	1
James Downey	1054	Canada	15/06/2013	1
Jack McGrath	1055	Samoa	09/11/2013	56
Dave Kearney	1056	Samoa	09/11/2013	19
Martin Moore	1057	Scotland	02/02/2014	10
Jordi Murphy	1058	England	22/02/2014	30
Robbie Diack	1059	Argentina	07/06/2014	2
Rodney Ah You	1060	Argentina	07/06/2014	3
Kieran Marmion	1061	Argentina	07/06/2014	28
James Cronin	1062	Argentina	13/06/2014	3
Rob Herring	1063	Argentina	13/06/2014	43
Noel Reid	1064	Argentina	13/06/2014	1
Jared Payne	1065	South Africa	08/11/2014	20
Dave Foley	1066	Georgia	16/11/2014	2
Dominic Ryan	1067	Georgia	16/11/2014	1
Robin Copeland	1068	Georgia	16/11/2014	1
Jack Conan	1069	Scotland	15/08/2015	62
Nathan White	1070	Scotland	15/08/2015	13
Tadhg Furlong	1071	Wales	29/08/2015	91
CJ Stander	1072	Wales	07/02/2016	50
Stuart McCloskey	1073	England	27/02/2016	34
Josh van der Flier	1074	England	27/02/2016	84
Ultan Dillane	1075	England	27/02/2016	19
Finlay Bealham	1076	Italy	12/03/2016	59
Quinn Roux	1077	South Africa	18/06/2016	16
Tiernan O'Halloran	1078	South Africa	18/06/2016	6
Sean Reidy	1079	South Africa	18/06/2016	2
Matt Healy	1080	South Africa	25/06/2016	1
Joey Carbery	1081	New Zealand	05/11/2016	38
Billy Holland	1082	Canada	12/11/2016	1
Jack O'Donoghue	1083	Canada	12/11/2016	2
Garry Ringrose	1084	Canada	12/11/2016	76
Niyi Adeolokun	1085	Canada	12/11/2016	1
Dan Leavy	1086	Canada	12/11/2016	11
Luke McGrath	1087	Canada	12/11/2016	19
John Ryan	1088	Canada	12/11/2016	24
James Tracy	1089	Canada	12/11/2016	6
Niall Scannell	1090	Italy	11/02/2017	20
Andrew Conway	1091	England	18/03/2017	30
Jacob Stockdale	1092	USA	10/06/2017	43
Dave Heffernan	1093	USA	10/06/2017	7
Andrew Porter	1094	USA	10/06/2017	82
James J. Ryan	1095	USA	10/06/2017	86
Rory Scannell	1096	USA	10/06/2017	3
Rory O'Loughlin	1097	Japan	17/06/2017	1
Kieran Treadwell	1098	Japan	17/06/2017	11
John Cooney	1099	Japan	24/06/2017	11
Bundee Aki	1100	South Africa	11/11/2017	74
Darren Sweetnam	1101	South Africa	11/11/2017	3
Chris Farrell	1102	Fiji	18/11/2017	15
Adam Byrne	1103	Argentina	25/11/2017	1
Jordan Larmour	1104	Italy	10/02/2018	32
Tadhg Beirne	1105	Australia	16/06/2018	76
Will Addison	1106	Italy	03/11/2018	5
Ross Byrne	1107	Italy	03/11/2018	22
Sammy Arnold	1108	USA	24/11/2018	1
Jack Carty	1109	Italy	24/02/2019	11
Jean Kleyn	1110	Italy	10/08/2019	5
Mike Haley	1111	Italy	10/08/2019	1
Caelan Doris	1112	Scotland	01/02/2020	60
Rónan Kelleher	1113	Scotland	01/02/2020	54
Max Deegan	1114	Wales	08/02/2020	4
Will Connors	1115	Italy	24/10/2020	9
Hugo Keenan	1116	Italy	24/10/2020	50
Ed Byrne	1117	Italy	24/10/2020	6
Jamison Gibson-Park	1118	Italy	24/10/2020	56
James Lowe	1119	Wales	13/11/2020	45
Billy Burns	1120	Wales	13/11/2020	7
Shane Daly	1121	Georgia	29/11/2020	2
Eric O'Sullivan	1122	Scotland	05/12/2020	1
Ryan Baird	1123	Italy	27/02/2021	36
Craig Casey	1124	Italy	27/02/2021	32
Gavin Coombes	1125	Japan	03/07/2021	3
Robert Baloucoune	1126	USA	10/07/2021	12
James Hume	1127	USA	10/07/2021	3
Tom O'Toole	1128	USA	10/07/2021	27
Nick Timoney	1129	USA	10/07/2021	17
Caolin Blade	1130	USA	10/07/2021	4
Paul Boyle	1131	USA	10/07/2021	1
Harry Byrne	1132	USA	10/07/2021	5
Fineen Wycherley	1133	USA	10/07/2021	1
Dan Sheehan	1134	Japan	06/11/2021	43
Mack Hansen	1135	Wales	05/02/2022	33
Michael Lowry	1136	Italy	27/02/2022	1
Jimmy O'Brien	1137	South Africa	05/11/2022	14
Jeremy Loughman	1138	Fiji	12/11/2022	10
Jack Crowley	1139	Fiji	12/11/2022	35
Cian Prendergast	1140	Fiji	12/11/2022	12
Joe McCarthy	1141	Australia	19/11/2022	28
Jack Belton	1142	France	26/01/1946	
Hugh Dolan	1143	France	26/01/1946	
Harry Greer	1144	France	26/01/1946	
Jack Guiney	1145	France	26/01/1946	
Des Thorpe	1146	France	26/01/1946	
Paul Traynor	1147	Argentina	24/08/1952	
John Birch	1148	Argentina	13/09/1970	
Frank O'Driscoll	1149	Argentina	13/09/1970	2
Leo Galvin	1150	Argentina	10/11/1973	1
Emmet O'Rafferty	1151	Fiji	08/06/1976	1
Rab Brady	1152	Japan	26/05/1985	
Paul Clinch	1153	Canada	02/09/1989	
Gerry Quinn	1154		1946	
Terry Coveney	1155		1946	
Austin Carry	1156		1946	
Gordon Dudgeon	1157		1946	
Teddy Coolican	1158		1946	
Ciarán Frawley	1159	Italy	05/08/2023	17
Tom Stewart	1160	Italy	05/08/2023	8
Calvin Nash	1161	Italy	05/08/2023	12
Oli Jager	1162	Wales	24/02/2024	1
Jamie Osborne	1163	South Africa	06/07/2024	19
Tom Clarkson	1164	Argentina	15/11/2024	17
Sam Prendergast	1165	Argentina	15/11/2024	20
Cormac Izuchukwu	1166	Fiji	23/11/2024	5
Gus McCarthy	1167	Fiji	23/11/2024	7
Jack Boyle	1168	Wales	22/02/2025	4
Darragh Murray	1169	Georgia	05/07/2025	4
Tommy O'Brien	1170	Georgia	05/07/2025	10
Michael Milne	1171	Georgia	05/07/2025	5
Thomas Ahern	1172	Georgia	05/07/2025	2
Jack Aungier	1173	Georgia	05/07/2025	1
Ben Murphy	1174	Georgia	05/07/2025	2
Shayne Bolton	1175	Portugal	12/07/2025	1
Hugh Gavin	1176	Portugal	12/07/2025	1
Alex Kendellen	1177	Portugal	12/07/2025	1
Paddy McCarthy	1178	New Zealand	01/11/2025	4
Tom Farrell	1179	Japan	08/11/2025	3
Edwin Edogbo	1180	Italy	14/02/2026	1
Nathan Doak	1181	Wales	06/03/2026	2
Sean Jansen	1182	Japan	11/07/2026	3
Sam Illo	1183	Japan	11/07/2026	3
Billy Bohan	1184	Japan	11/07/2026	1
Bryn Ward	1185	Japan	11/07/2026	1
James McNabney	1186	Fiji	15/11/2026	1

Caps updated after the third match of the 2026 Nations Championship Northern Hemisphere Series.
