= William Hogg =

William Hogg may refer to:

- William Hogg (rugby union), Irish international rugby union player
- William Clifford Hogg (1875–1930), civic leader, son of Texas Governor Jim Hogg
- Billy Hogg (1879–1937), English footballer, outside right, played in Scotland
- Bill Hogg (1881–1909), New York baseball player
- Billy Hogg (Scottish footballer) (fl. 1920s), Scottish football wing forward
- Willie Hogg (born 1955), British cricket player

== See also ==
- William Lindsay-Hogg of the Lindsay-Hogg baronets
