= Thomas Halpin =

Thomas Halpin may refer to:

- Thomas Halpin (runner), American middle distance runner
- Thomas Halpin (rugby union), Irish rugby union player
- Tom Halpin, Irish submission wrestler and Brazilian jiu-jitsu competitor
- Thomas Scot Halpin, American artist and musician
