= William Pike =

William Pike may refer to:

- William Pike (martyr)
- William Pike (British Army officer)
- William Pike (jockey)
- William Pike (rugby union)
- William Thomas Pike, English publisher, printer, editor and journalist
