= William Gardiner (rugby union) =

Rugby union player from Northern Ireland

- Born: Co. Armagh, Ireland
- Died: 21 March 1924 Dungannon, Northern Ireland

Rugby union career
- Position: Three-quarter
International career
Years	Team	Apps	(Points)
1892–98	Ireland	17	(6)

William Gardiner was an Irish international rugby union player.

A native of County Armagh, Gardiner was a North of Ireland three-quarter, capped 17 times for Ireland in the 1890s. He appeared in the 1894 triple crown-winning team and held the captaincy for his final match against Wales in 1898.

Gardiner's nephew James Gardiner was capped for Ireland.

Married with three children, Gardiner was a weaving company director and died of a stroke in 1924.

== See also ==
- List of Ireland national rugby union players
