= William Riordan =

William Riordan may refer to:

- Bill Riordan, Australian politician
- William F. Riordan, American justice of the New Mexico Supreme Court
- William Riordan (rugby union), Irish international rugby union player
- Jim Riordan (William James Riordan), Australian politician and judge
