= Hex Uprichard =

Rugby union player from Northern Ireland

- Full name: Robert John (Hex) Uprichard
- Born: 31 December 1922 Portadown, Northern Ireland
- Died: 6 April 2010 (aged 87) Boston, Lincs, England
- School: Portadown College
- University: Queen's University
- Occupation: RAF officer

Rugby union career
- Position: Centre
International career
Years	Team	Apps	(Points)
1950	Ireland	2	(0)

Robert John Hex Uprichard (31 December 1922 — 6 April 2010) was an Irish international rugby union player.

Uprichard was born in Portadown, County Armagh, and was educated with his four brothers at Portadown College. He attended Queen's University Belfast and during his time in the city played rugby for the North of Ireland club.

A Royal Air Force officer, Uprichard captained the Lincolnshire county side, in postings to both RAF Binbrook and RAF Swinderby. His Ireland call up in 1950 was considered a surprise, as he had not attended trials or appeared for Ulster. He came into the side for George Phipps, who was ill with influenza, to gain caps against Scotland and Wales.

He went by the nickname Hex.

== See also ==
- List of Ireland national rugby union players
