= Richard Graham (rugby union, born 1889) =

Irish rugby union player

- Full name: Richard Irvine Graham
- Born: 22 July 1889 Celbridge, Kildare, Ireland
- Died: 15 April 1912 (aged 22) Midhurst, Kent, England
- University: Trinity College Dublin

Rugby union career
- Position: Forward
International career
Years	Team	Apps	(Points)
1911	Ireland	1	(0)

Richard Irvine Graham (22 July 1889 – 15 April 1912) was an Irish international rugby union player.

Born in Celbridge, Graham was a member of the Dublin University first XV and received his only Ireland cap in 1911, replacing forward Michael Garry for their final Home Nations fixture, a 25–5 win over France at Cork.

Graham died in 1912 of an undisclosed illness, aged 22.

== See also ==
- List of Ireland national rugby union players
