= Ernest Ridgeway =

Irish rugby union player

- Full name: Ernest Charles Ridgeway
- Born: 16 September 1911 Dublin, Ireland
- Died: 2 May 1986 (aged 74) Dublin, Ireland

Rugby union career
- Position: Utility back
International career
Years	Team	Apps	(Points)
1932–35	Ireland	5	(3)

Ernest Charles Ridgeway (16 September 1911 — 2 May 1986) was an Irish international rugby union player.

Born in Dublin, Ridgeway was capped five times for Ireland. He featured in most backline positions in matches for his club Wanderers and was a long kick of the ball, but was best suited to playing as a three-quarter. His first international opportunity came deputising injured fullback Dermot Morris in 1932, for their wins over Scotland and Wales. When he returned to the side in 1935 it was as a centre and he scored a try to help defeat Scotland at Lansdowne Road.

== See also ==
- List of Ireland national rugby union players
