= Potterton (disambiguation) =

Potterton is a village near Aberdeen, Scotland.

Potterton may also refer to:

- Potterton, West Yorkshire, England, a hamlet
- Frederic Potterton (died 1912), Anglican priest in Ireland
- Gerald Potterton (1931–2022), Canadian animator and director
- Homan Potterton (1946–2020), Irish art historian
- Norman Potterton (1897–1980), Irish rugby player
