= Dave Kiely =

Irish rugby union player

- Full name: Matthew David Kiely
- Born: 27 February 1935 Cork, Ireland
- Died: 27 July 2025 (aged 90) Cork
- University: University College Cork
- Occupation: Surgeon

Rugby union career
- Position: Wing-forward
International career
Years	Team	Apps	(Points)
1962–63	Ireland	5	(0)

Matthew David Kiely is an Irish former international rugby union player.

Kiely is a native of Cork and played his rugby for University College Cork during his medical studies. He won five Ireland caps, debuting against Wales in the 1962 Five Nations, a delayed match which didn't take place until November due to a smallpox epidemic in Wales. His other international matches all came in the 1963 Five Nations. He was a Munster representative player, as was his younger brother Paddy.

A surgeon by profession, Kiely was also an amateur golfer.

== See also ==
- List of Ireland national rugby union players
