= Reginald Odbert =

Irish rugby union player

- Full name: Reginald Vere Massey Odbert
- Born: 9 February 1904 Monkstown, Dublin, Ireland
- Died: 18 July 1943 (aged 39) near Appleby, Lincolnshire, England
- School: Blackrock College

Rugby union career
- Position: Centre
International career
Years	Team	Apps	(Points)
1928	Ireland	1	(0)

Reginald Vere Massey Odbert (9 February 1904 — 18 July 1943) was an Irish international rugby union player.

== Biography ==
Odbert was born in Monkstown, Dublin, and educated at Blackrock College. He was son of Herbert Massey Odbert and his wife Annie Emily.

A Royal Air Force officer, Odbert captained the RAF rugby team and in 1928 was capped for Ireland, playing as the left centre in a match against France at Ravenhill.

Odbert served as station commander of RAF Syerston, with rank of Group Captain. He died in a plane accident while participating in a gunnery training course on 18 July 1943. The plane crashed near Appleby, Lincolnshire, killing the 39 year old Odbert and five others. His body was buried at the cemetery in Newark on Trent, Nottinghamshire.

== See also ==
- List of Ireland national rugby union players
