= William Moore (rugby union) =

Rugby union player from Northern Ireland

- Full name: William David Moore
- Born: Connor, County Antrim, Ireland
- Died: 30 January 1926 Virginia Water, Surrey, England
- Occupation: Physician

Rugby union career
- Position: Forward
International career
Years	Team	Apps	(Points)
1878	Ireland	1	(0)

William David Moore was an Irish international rugby union player.

Moore was born in Connor, County Antrim, and while a Queen's College Belfast varsity player was capped as a forward for Ireland in a match against England at Lansdowne Road in 1878.

A medical graduate of the Royal University of Ireland, Moore got his licentiate from the Royal College of Physicians in 1888 and for many years was the medical superintendent of Holloway Sanatorium in Virginia Water, Surrey.

== See also ==
- List of Ireland national rugby union players
