= Hector Kennedy =

Rugby union player from Northern Ireland

Hector Kennedy MBE
- Born: 1 July 1917
- Died: 15 July 1975 (aged 58) Washington DC, United States

Rugby union career
- Position: Prop
International career
Years	Team	Apps	(Points)
1938	Ireland	2	(0)

Hector Kennedy (1 July 1917 — 15 January 1975) was an Irish international rugby union player.

Kennedy was educated at Royal Belfast Academical Institution and Queen's University Belfast.

A prop, Kennedy played for Instonians and was varsity captain at Queen's University. He moved to England to practise medicine after getting his degree, playing there for Bradford and Yorkshire. In 1938, Kennedy was capped twice for Ireland in the 1938 Home Nations, for away matches against Scotland and Wales.

Kennedy served as a major in the Royal Army Medical Corps during World War II. He was awarded an MBE in 1945 for his gallantry in North West Europe and also received the Croix de Guerre.

== See also ==
- List of Ireland national rugby union players
