= Walter Kelly (rugby union) =

Irish rugby union player

- Full name: Walter Blake Kelly
- Died: 18 November 1892 (aged 36)
- University: Trinity College Dublin

Rugby union career
- Position: Forward
International career
Years	Team	Apps	(Points)
1884	Ireland	1	(0)

Walter Blake Kelly was an Irish international rugby union player.

Kelly, a Wanderers forward, was capped for Ireland against Scotland at Edinburgh in 1884. He was also a rower of note during his time at Trinity College Dublin and won multiple Irish sculling championships.

After retiring due to health issues, Kelly died young of heart disease in 1892.

== See also ==
- List of Ireland national rugby union players
