= Barney Hughes (rugby union) =

Irish rugby union player (died 1927)

- Full name: Robert Wood Hughes
- Died: 15 January 1927

Rugby union career
- Position: Forward
International career
Years	Team	Apps	(Points)
1878–86	Ireland	12	(0)

Robert Wood Hughes, known as Barney Hughes, was an Irish international rugby union player.

A strong-scrummaging forward, Hughes played for Belfast club North of Ireland and was capped 12 times for Ireland from 1878 to 1886, with all of his matches coming against either England or Scotland.

Hughes served as president of the Northern Branch of the IRU in 1889–90.

Outside of rugby, Hughes was a teacher, working as an assistant master at both Lurgan College and the Royal Belfast Academical Institution, then later became senior inspector of schools.

== See also ==
- List of Ireland national rugby union players
