= Maurice Barlow =

Irish rugby union player

- Born: 10 May 1850 Dublin, Ireland
- Died: 22 April 1935 (aged 84) Woollahra, NSW, Australia

Rugby union career
- Position: Forward
International career
| Years | Team | Apps | (Points) |
| 1875 | Ireland | 1 | (0) |

Maurice Barlow (10 May 1850 — 22 April 1935) was an Irish international rugby union player.He also represented the New South Wales (NSW) side in Australia in 1882.

Born in Dublin, Barlow played rugby for Wanderers was gained his only Ireland cap as a forward in the team's inaugural international match, against England at The Oval in February 1875. Barlow emigrated to Australia three weeks after his Ireland cap.

Employed as a surveyor, Barlow immediately took up rugby in Sydney with the Wallaroo FC where he had a long career extending well into the 1880s. In 1877 he was joined at the Wallaroos by fellow 1875 Ireland representative player Henry Deane Walsh.

In his final season Barlow represented NSW (now Waratahs) in their second ever interstate fixture against Queensland (now Reds) in 1882.

== See also ==
- List of Ireland national rugby union players
