= Leslie Malcolmson =

Rugby union player from Northern Ireland

- Full name: George Leslie Morris Malcolmson
- Born: 2 May 1910 Lurgan, Co. Armagh, Ireland
- Died: 29 April 1993 (aged 82) Belfast, Northern Ireland

Rugby union career
- Position: Fullback
International career
Years	Team	Apps	(Points)
1935–37	Ireland	7	(0)

George Leslie Morris Malcolmson (2 May 1910 — 29 April 1993) was an Irish international rugby union player.

Born in Lurgan, Malcolmson played for Belfast club North of Ireland and also spent time in England, where he competed with Northampton. He underwent RAF training at No. 3 Flying Training School in Grantham, Lincolnshire

Malcolmson was a versatile back, who played as a centre on his Ireland debut against the All Blacks at Lansdowne Road in 1935, but gained his other six caps at fullback. The Irish Rugby Annual named Malcolmson as one of the four "Irish stars" of the 1935-36 season, described him as demonstrating a "keen sense of position, safe pair of hands and a lengthy and accurate kick with either foot". He played all of Ireland's 1936 and 1937 Home Nations matches.

== See also ==
- List of Ireland national rugby union players
