= Robert McClenahan =

Rugby union player from Northern Ireland

- Full name: Robert Orr McClenahan
- Born: 10 May 1902 Belfast, Ireland
- Died: 10 October 1957 (aged 55) Belfast, Northern Ireland

Rugby union career
- Position: Wing
International career
Years	Team	Apps	(Points)
1923	Ireland	3	(0)

Robert Orr McClenahan (10 May 1902 — 10 October 1957) was an Irish international rugby union player.

McClenahan was a wing three-quarter from Belfast, capped three times for Ireland in the 1923 Five Nations. He captained Instonians to their first ever Bateman Cup title in 1926–27.

An accountant, McClenahan was a governor of the Royal Belfast Academical Institution and remained involved in rugby as an administrator, serving on the senior committee of the Ulster branch of the IRFU.

== See also ==
- List of Ireland national rugby union players
