= Frederick McCormac =

Irish rugby union player

- Full name: Frederick Maxwell McCormac
- Born: 21 May 1884 Dalkey, Ireland
- Died: 1973

Rugby union career
- Position: Scrum-half
International career
Years	Team	Apps	(Points)
1909–10	Ireland	3	(0)

Frederick Maxwell McCormac (1884 – 1973) was an Irish international rugby union player.

Born in Dalkey, McCormac was a halfback and played his early rugby for London Irish, before returning to Ireland in 1906 to take up a position with the Irish Land Commission. He subsequently joined Dublin club Wanderers, from where he was called up by Ireland for the first time in 1909, going on to attain three international caps.

McCormac served as an officer in the Royal Inniskilling Fusiliers and was proprietor of The Fountain in Loughton.

== See also ==
- List of Ireland national rugby union players
