= Jack Mattsson =

Irish rugby union player

- Full name: John Alfred Mattsson
- Born: 16 July 1917 Bandon, County Cork, Ireland
- Died: 16 October 1999 (aged 82) Cork, Ireland

Rugby union career
- Position: Fullback
International career
Years	Team	Apps	(Points)
1948	Ireland	1	(0)

John Alfred Mattsson (16 July 1917 — 16 October 1999) was an Irish international rugby union player.

Mattsson was a County Cork native and played for his rugby for Wanderers.

Although only capped once, Mattsson had the distinction of being part of Ireland's grand slam-winning 1948 Five Nations campaign. He came in at fullback for their second fixture, against England at Twickenham, deputising an unavailable Dudley Higgins. His performance was regarded as solid in a one-point win, with Ireland's Saturday Night highlighting his fielding and kicking, while also noting he'd been bettered by Dickie Guest in one of the England winger's two tries.

== See also ==
- List of Ireland national rugby union players
