= Freddie Moran =

Irish rugby union player

- Full name: Frederick George Moran
- Died: 17 October 1979

Rugby union career
- Position: Wing
International career
Years	Team	Apps	(Points)
1936–39	Ireland	9	(18)

Frederick George Moran was an Irish international rugby union player.

Moran was the son of a sports administrator who headed Ireland's Amateur Athletic Union.

A speedy Clontarf wing three-quarter, Moran was capped nine times for Ireland in the late 1930s, scoring six tries. He won national championships in both the 100 yard and 220 yard sprints every year from 1935 to 1938. His winning time for the 100 yards in 1937, clocked at 9.8 seconds, was an Irish record. Ireland's boycott of the 1936 Summer Olympics and the ensuing war prevent him from competing at the Olympics. He was also a British open clay pigeon shooting champion.

Moran's granddaughter Sonya McGinn represented Ireland in badminton at the 2000 Summer Olympics in Sydney.

== See also ==
- List of Ireland national rugby union players
