= Thomas Dunn (rugby union) =

Rugby union player from Northern Ireland

- Full name: Thomas Browne Dunn
- Born: 1 July 1913 Belfast, Ireland
- Died: 22 December 1975 (aged 62)

Rugby union career
- Position: Prop
International career
Years	Team	Apps	(Points)
1935	Ireland	1	(0)

Thomas Browne Dunn (1 July 1913 — 22 December 1975) was an Irish international rugby union player.

Born in Belfast, Dunn was a forward and played his club rugby for North of Ireland. He scored Ulster's try in their 3–3 draw with the touring 1935–36 All Blacks and subsequently gained his only Ireland cap against the same opponent.

Dunn worked as a managing director of a printing firm. He was the grandfather of Ireland winger Justin Bishop.

== See also ==
- List of Ireland national rugby union players
