= Norman Ross (rugby union) =

Rugby union player from Northern Ireland

Norm Ross
- Full name: Norman Glendinning Ross
- Born: 15 July 1903 Clough, Ballymena, Ireland
- Died: 28 July 1977 (aged 74) Gunnedah, NSW, Australia

Rugby union career
- Position: No. 8
International career
Years	Team	Apps	(Points)
1927	Ireland	2	(0)

Norman Glendinning Ross (15 July 1903 – 28 July 1977) was an Irish international rugby union player.

== Biography ==
A Ballymena–born forward, Ross was attached to Belfast club Malone RFC and was capped twice for Ireland during their championship–winning 1927 Five Nations campaign. He debuted for Ireland in their tournament opener in France and kept his place for a match against England at Twickenham. After the England fixture, Ross broke his nose playing for Malone and was sidelined as a result.

Ross was a great-nephew of pastoralist Samuel McCaughey and also immigrated to Australia, along with his brother Ronald. He became a successful grazier in Gunnedah, New South Wales, and married a local named Millicent Mary Staughton.

== See also ==
- List of Ireland national rugby union players
