= Gerald Beckett =

Irish rugby union player

- Full name: Gerald Gordon Paul Beckett
- Born: 23 June 1886 Dublin, Ireland
- Died: 1 September 1950 (aged 64) Greystones, County Wicklow, Ireland

Rugby union career
- Position: Centre
International career
Years	Team	Apps	(Points)
1908	Ireland	3	(3)

Gerald Gordon Paul Beckett (23 June 1886 — 1 September 1950) was an Irish international rugby union player.

Born in Dublin, Beckett was the son of politician William Beckett, a local Irish Unionist Party councillor, and attended Wesley College. He was an uncle of the writer Samuel Beckett.

Beckett played his rugby for Dublin University and gained three Ireland caps as a centre three-quarter in 1908, scoring a try to help defeate Scotland at Lansdowne Road in his second match. His career was ended by injury later that season. He also represented Ireland as a water polo player.

A 1911 graduate of Trinity College, Beckett left for the Gold Coast in 1912 to be Medical Officer to the West African Medical staff, until being seconded to the Royal Army Medical Corps during World War I, serving in Salonika. He was later chairman of the Irish Pensions Appeal Tribunal and in 1930 took over as Medical Officer of Health for County Wicklow.

== See also ==
- List of Ireland national rugby union players
