= Joseph Neill =

Rugby union player from Northern Ireland

- Full name: Joseph McFerran Neill
- Born: 10 May 1905 Whitehead, County Antrim, Ireland
- Died: 10 June 1967 (aged 62)

Rugby union career
- Position: Wing-forward
International career
Years	Team	Apps	(Points)
1926	Ireland	1	(0)

Joseph McFerran Neill (10 June 1905 — 10 June 1967) was an Irish international rugby union player.

Born in Whitehead, County Antrim, Neill was educated at Royal Belfast Academical Institution and Queen's University Belfast. He gained an Ireland cap as a wing-forward against France at Belfast in 1926. After graduating from Queen's University, Neill began working for the Belfast Harbour Commissioners and became chief engineer in 1956.

== See also ==
- List of Ireland national rugby union players
