= Mike Sayers =

Irish rugby union player

- Full name: Herbert James Michael Sayers
- Born: 1 May 1911 Madras, India
- Died: 6 December 1943 (aged 32) Ampthill, England
- School: Stonyhurst College

Rugby union career
- Position: Wing-forward
International career
Years	Team	Apps	(Points)
1935–39	Ireland	10	(3)

Herbert James Michael Sayers (1 May 1911 — 6 December 1943) was an Irish international rugby union player.

Born in Madras, Sayers was the only child of India-based civil servant Sir Frederick Sayers. He picked up rugby union as a schoolboy at Stonyhurst College in England and went on to attend Sandhurst.

Sayers married the daughter of Woolworth chairman W. L. Stephenson, owner of the yacht Velsheda.

A loose forward, Sayers played for Aldershot Services, the Army, Lansdowne, Richmond and Rosslyn Park. He represented Ireland during the late 1930s, debuting in their championship-winning 1935 Home Nations campaign as a wing-forward, a position he played exclusively aside from one match as a stand in wing three-quarter.

Sayers was an army major, attached to the Canadian Artillery regiment during World War II, and died on active service as the passenger in a plane that crashed in Buckinghamshire on 6 December 1943, at the age of 32.

== See also ==
- List of Ireland national rugby union players
