= William Hall (rugby union) =

Rugby union player from Northern Ireland

- Full name: William Herdman Hall
- Born: 16 August 1901 Belfast, Ireland
- Died: 20 October 1983 (aged 82) Belfast, Northern Ireland
- Occupation: Chartered accountant

Rugby union career
- Position: Fly-half
International career
Years	Team	Apps	(Points)
1923–24	Ireland	6	(0)

William Herdman Hall (16 August 1901 — 20 October 1983) was an Irish international rugby union player.

Born in Belfast, Hall was rugby captain for his final year at Royal Belfast Academical Institution and then became a foundation player for Instonians, winning back to back Ulster Senior Cups in 1922 and 1923.

Hall gained six Ireland caps as a fly-half, debuting against England at Leicester in 1923. The following year, Hall formed with John McDowell an all-Instonians Ireland halfback combination for a match against France.

== See also ==
- List of Ireland national rugby union players
