= Sam Boyd Campbell =

Irish rugby union player

Sam Boyd Campbell MC
- Full name: Samuel Burnside Boyd Campbell
- Born: 29 June 1889 Cuddapah, British India
- Died: 28 February 1971 (aged 81) Ballycastle, County Antrim, Northern Ireland
- School: Foyle College
- University: University of Edinburgh
- Occupation: Medical doctor

Rugby union career
- Position: Forward
International career
Years	Team	Apps	(Points)
1911–13	Ireland	12	(0)

Samuel Burnside Boyd Campbell (29 June 1889 — 28 February 1971) was an Irish international rugby union player.

Born in British India, Campbell was the son of Irish Presbyterian missionaries and attended Foyle College in Derry, followed by medical studies at the University of Edinburgh.

Campbell gained 12 Ireland caps as a forward between 1911 and 1913.

In World War I, Campbell volunteered with the 36th Ulster Division and was attached to the 108th Field Ambulance of the Royal Army Medical Corps. He was involved in the Battle of the Somme and earned a Military Cross in 1918.

Campbell was a professor of medicine at Queen's University Belfast and a consultant physician to Royal Victoria Hospital. He retired to Ballycastle, County Antrim, in 1954.

== See also ==
- List of Ireland national rugby union players
