= Ernest Caddell =

Irish rugby player (1881–1942)

Ernest Caddell MC
- Full name: Ernest Duncan Caddell
- Born: 18 November 1881 Dundalk, Co. Louth, Ireland
- Died: 27 May 1942 (aged 60) Farnham, Surrey, England

Rugby union career
- Position: Scrum-half
International career
Years	Team	Apps	(Points)
1904–08	Ireland	13	(6)

Ernest Duncan Caddell (18 November 1881 — 27 May 1942) was an Irish international rugby union player.

Born in Dundalk, Co. Louth, Caddell attended Portora Royal School and Trinity College Dublin.

Caddell was a Dublin University and Wanderers halfback, capped 13 times for Ireland from 1904 to 1908, often forming a halfback combination with Thomas Robinson. He scored two tries in a win over England at Lansdowne Road in 1907.

A British Army officer, Caddell served with the Field Ambulance in World War I, during which he was mentioned in dispatches and awarded with the Military Cross. He had several overseas postings over the next two decades before retiring in 1936, with the rank of lieutenant colonel.

== See also ==
- List of Ireland national rugby union players
