= Tommy Headon =

Irish rugby union player

- Full name: Thomas Anthony Aloysius Headon
- Born: 21 June 1918 Ballyporeen, Co. Tipperary, Ireland
- Died: 21 August 1966 (aged 48)

Rugby union career
- Position: Prop
International career
| Years | Team | Apps | (Points) |
| 1939 | Ireland | 2 | (0) |

Thomas Anthony Aloysius Headon (21 June 1918 — 21 August 1966) was an Irish international rugby union player.

Born in Ballyporeen, Co. Tipperary, Headon grew up in Dublin and attended O'Connell School.

Headon won a national championship (NACA) in shot-put in 1938.

A prop, Headon played his rugby for University College Dublin (UDC) and London Irish. He was capped twice for Ireland during the 1939 Home Nations, appearing against Scotland at Lansdowne Road and Wales at Belfast.

Headon graduated with first-class honours from UCD and became managing director of Urney Chocolates.

== See also ==
- List of Ireland national rugby union players
