= Tom Gavin =

Irish rugby union player

- Full name: Thomas Joseph Gavin
- Born: 28 March 1922 Coventry, England
- Died: 25 December 2009 (aged 87) Coventry, England
- School: Cotton College
- University: Christ's College, Cambridge
- Occupation: Priest / Educator

Rugby union career
- Position: Centre
International career
Years	Team	Apps	(Points)
1949	Ireland	2	(0)

Thomas Joseph Gavin (28 March 1922 — 25 December 2009) was an Irish Roman Catholic priest, educator and international rugby union player.

== Biography ==
Born to Irish parents in Coventry, Gavin attended local primary schools, followed by Cotton College junior seminary, where he learned his rugby. He studied for the priesthood at St Mary's College, Oscott, and was ordained in 1946.

Gavin graduated from Christ's College, Cambridge, in 1949 with a first in classics.

A centre, Gavin played his rugby for Warwickshire clubs Coventry, Moseley and Nuneaton, as well as London Irish.

Gavin became the only person to play international rugby while an ordained Catholic priest in 1949, when he was capped twice by Ireland in the Five Nations, having refused an ordinance from the Archbishop of Dublin John Charles McQuaid to make himself unavailable. He played the first two fixtures of what was a triple crown-winning campaign for Ireland.

Between 1967 and 1978, Gavin served as headmaster of Cotton College.

Gavin headed the Birmingham archdiocesan educational service and from 1978 to 2004 was the priest of St Thomas More Parish, Coventry. He organised the 1982 visit to Coventry of Pope John Paul II, who arrived by helicopter to Baginton Airport and held a Mass to 300,000 worshipers.

== See also ==
- List of Ireland national rugby union players
