= Luke Holmes (rugby union, born 1868) =

Rugby union player from Northern Ireland

- Full name: Luke Jackson Holmes
- Born: 11 March 1868 Belfast, Ireland
- Died: 19 March 1939 (aged 71) Antrim, Northern Ireland
- School: Methodist College Belfast
- Occupation: Solicitor

Rugby union career
- Position: Fullback
International career
Years	Team	Apps	(Points)
1889	Ireland	2	(0)

Luke Jackson Holmes (11 March 1868 — 19 March 1939) was an Irish international rugby union player.

Born in Belfast, Holmes attended Methodist College Belfast and after finishing school played rugby for Lisburn. He was capped twice as a fullback for Ireland in 1889, debuting against Scotland in Belfast. His other match is notable as being Ireland's first ever away win over Wales. He also represented Ulster as a hockey player.

Holmes had a solicitor's practice in Antrim.

== See also ==
- List of Ireland national rugby union players
