= William Gaffikin =

Rugby union player from Northern Ireland

- Born: 31 July 1853
- Died: 17 July 1939 (aged 85)

Rugby union career
- Position: Forward
International career
Years	Team	Apps	(Points)
1875	Ireland	1	(0)

William Gaffikin (31 July 1853 — 17 July 1939) was an Irish international rugby union player.

Raised in Belfast, Gaffikin was the youngest son of local councillor and linen merchant Thomas Gaffin. He attended the Royal Belfast Academical Institution and was a rugby player in his youth, gaining an Ireland cap in the team's first ever international match in 1875, against England at The Oval.

Gaffikin went into the linen trade and became head of his father's company.

== See also ==
- List of Ireland national rugby union players
