= Robert Bradshaw (rugby union) =

Irish rugby union player

- Full name: Robert MacNevin Bradshaw
- Born: 27 May 1861 Gorey, County Wexford, Ireland
- Died: 23 December 1907 (aged 46) Ballinascorney, Brittas, County Dublin, Ireland

Rugby union career
- Position: Forward
International career
Years	Team	Apps	(Points)
1885	Ireland	3	(0)

Robert MacNevin Bradshaw (27 May 1861 – 23 December 1907) was an Irish international rugby union player.

Born in Gorey, County Wexford, Bradshaw was described as a "middle-weight forward of great pace and dash" by Dublin newspaper Sport, and was said to be particularly injury prone. He played his rugby for Wanderers in Dublin and captained the club to the 1885 Leinster Senior Cup title. His three Ireland appearances also came in 1885. He served as club president of Wanderers and founded their clubhouse on South Frederick Street.

Bradshaw ran a land agency business in Dublin.

== See also ==
- List of Ireland national rugby union players
