= Thomas Donovan (rugby union) =

Irish rugby union player

- Full name: Thomas Matthew Donovan
- Born: 27 February 1867 Blarney, County Cork, Ireland
- Died: 30 June 1938 (aged 71) Sydney, NSW, Australia

Rugby union career
- Position: Forward
International career
Years	Team	Apps	(Points)
1889	Ireland	1	(0)

Thomas Matthew Donovan (27 February 1867 — 30 June 1938) was an Irish international rugby union player.

The eldest of eight siblings, Donovan hailed from Blarney in County Cork and attended Queen's College Cork, before undertaking further studies at the University of Edinburgh. He gained his solitary Ireland cap while with Edinburgh University RFC, playing as a forward against Scotland at Belfast in 1889. An all-round sportsman, Donovan also won Irish Championships in the 440 yards and decathlon, as well as three Scottish amateur boxing titles.

Immigrating to Australia, Donovan settled in the town of Richmond near Sydney, where he was a medical officer.

== See also ==
- List of Ireland national rugby union players
