= Abram Combe (rugby union) =

Rugby union player from Northern Ireland

- Born: 16 July 1852 Belfast, Ireland
- Died: 20 August 1917 (aged 65) Lurgan, Ireland

Rugby union career
- Position: Forward
International career
Years	Team	Apps	(Points)
1875	Ireland	1	(0)

Abram Combe (16 July 1852 — 20 August 1917) was an Irish international rugby union player.

Combe was born in Belfast, to a Scottish father, and attended Royal Belfast Academical Institution.

A foundation player for Belfast's North of Ireland club, Combe was capped once for Ireland, as a forward in their first ever international against England at The Oval in 1875.

Combe became an engineer like his father and was partner in the textile firm Combe Barbour & Combe Ltd.

== See also ==
- List of Ireland national rugby union players
