= George Stack (rugby union) =

Rugby union player from Northern Ireland

- Full name: George Hall Stack
- Born: 2 March 1850 Omagh, Ireland
- Died: 14 November 1876 (aged 26) Dublin, Ireland
- University: Trinity College Dublin
- Occupation: Barrister

Rugby union career
International career
Years	Team	Apps	(Points)
1875	Ireland	1	(0)

George Hall Stack (2 March 1850 — 14 November 1876) was an Irish international rugby union player.

The son of a Omagh barrister, Stack attended Raphoe College in County Donegal and studied law at Trinity College Dublin, playing rugby for the Dublin University Football Club.

Stack was influential in the formation of what became the Irish Rugby Football Union, hosting the meeting where it was decided to found an organising body. He served as a committeeman and captained Ireland for their historic first ever international in 1875, against England at The Oval, which would be his only national cap.

In 1876, Stack died from an accidental opiate overdose, at the age of 26.

== See also ==
- List of Ireland national rugby union players
