= George McConnell (rugby union) =

Irish rugby union player

- Born: 1 August 1889 Fanad, County Donegal, Ireland
- Died: 24 March 1948 (aged 58) Carnoustie, Scotland

Rugby union career
- Position: Forward
International career
Years	Team	Apps	(Points)
1912–13	Ireland	4	(0)

George McConnell (1 August 1889 — 24 March 1948) was an Irish international rugby union player.

Born in Fanad, County Donegal, McConnell played rugby with Edinburgh University while studying medicine. He was capped four times as a forward for Ireland across the 1912 and 1913 Five Nations Championships.

McConnell served with the Royal Army Medical Corps in Salonika during World War I.

A doctor, McConnell practised medicine in the Scottish town of Carnoustie, which he moved to in 1919.

== See also ==
- List of Ireland national rugby union players
