= John Wilgar Taylor =

Rugby union player from Northern Ireland

- Born: 30 June 1859 County Armagh, Ireland
- Died: 16 December 1924 (aged 65) Belfast, Northern Ireland

Rugby union career
- Position: Forward
International career
Years	Team	Apps	(Points)
1879–83	Ireland	8	(0)

John Wilgar Taylor (30 June 1859 — 16 December 1924) was an Irish international rugby union player.

The son of a merchant, Taylor was raised in County Armagh and attended Queen's University Belfast.

Taylor, a forward, captained Belfast club North of Ireland FC and was capped eight times for Ireland from 1879 to 1883, which included a stint as team captain. He was also captain of the North of Ireland Cricket Club, leading two Northern Cricket Union Challenge Cup-winning sides.

A Fellow of the Ulster Medical Society, Taylor had a medical practice on Ormeau Road in Belfast.

== See also ==
- List of Ireland national rugby union players
