= Patrick Lawlor (rugby union) =

Irish rugby union player

- Full name: Patrick Joseph Lawlor
- Born: circa 1908 Dunlavin, Wicklow, Ireland
- Died: 30 October 1965 Dunlavin, Wicklow, Ireland

Rugby union career
- Position: Wing forward
International career
Years	Team	Apps	(Points)
1935–37	Ireland	6	(3)

Patrick Joseph Lawlor was an Irish international rugby union player.

A native of Dunlavin, County Wicklow, Lawlor was a Bective Rangers wing–forward and gained six Ireland caps. He featured in all three matches of their 1935 Home Nations campaign, then didn't get called upon in 1936 due to injury problems, before returning for a further three appearance in 1937.

== See also ==
- List of Ireland national rugby union players
