= William Sparrow =

Irish rugby union player

- Born: circa 1869 Kilkenny, Ireland
- Died: 3 November 1939 Buckrose, Yorkshire, England

Rugby union career
- Position: Fullback
International career
Years	Team	Apps	(Points)
1893–94	Ireland	2	(0)

William Sparrow (1869 – 1939) was an Irish international rugby union player.

Sparrow was born in Kilkenny and attended Trinity College Dublin, where he played rugby. He gained two Ireland caps as a fullback, facing Wales at Llanelli in 1893, then England at Blackheath the following year.

Ordained in 1895, Sparrow served as a curate at several English parishes, before his appointment as vicar of Luttons Ambo, Malton in 1904, a position he held up until his death.

== See also ==
- List of Ireland national rugby union players
