= John Entrican =

Rugby union player from Northern Ireland

- Full name: John Cuthbertson Entrican
- Born: 24 September 1908 Cookstown, Ireland
- Died: 19 May 1985 (aged 76) Pontefract, England

Rugby union career
- Position: Fullback
International career
Years	Team	Apps	(Points)
1931	Ireland	1	(0)

John Cuthbertson Entrican (24 September 1908 — 19 May 1985) was an Irish international rugby union player.

The son of a Presbyterian minister, Entrican was a Queen's University Belfast, Ulster and Ireland fullback.

Entrican debuted for Ireland during the 1931 Five Nations Championship, deputising an injured James Egan at fullback for a match against Scotland at Lansdowne Road. His performance received mixed reviews, but Ireland were able to secure a 8–5 win. This remained his only international appearance.

== See also ==
- List of Ireland national rugby union players
