= Samuel Collier (rugby union) =

Irish rugby union player

- Full name: Samuel Ruddell Collier
- Born: 1 October 1863 Brookborough, County Cavan, Ireland
- Died: 29 August 1941 (aged 77) Bedford, Bedfordshire, England

Rugby union career
- Position: Halfback
International career
Years	Team	Apps	(Points)
1883	Ireland	1	(0)

Samuel Ruddell Collier (1 October 1863 — 29 August 1941) was an Irish international rugby union player.

Born in Brookborough, County Cavan, Collier was the son of a Methodist minister and attended Methodist College Belfast, followed by medical studies at Trinity College Dublin.

Collier was capped once for Ireland, as a halfback against Scotland at Belfast during the 1883 Home Nations, while also gaining Ireland representative honours as a lacrosse player.

A doctor by profession, Collier was a fellow of the Obstetrical Society of London. He practised medicine in Wimbledon for 46 years and also served as the borough's mayor.

== See also ==
- List of Ireland national rugby union players
