= Edgar Galbraith =

Irish rugby union player

- Born: 16 June 1853 Dublin, Ireland
- Died: 16 June 1899 (aged 46) Agra, India

Rugby union career
- Position: Forward
International career
Years	Team	Apps	(Points)
1875	Ireland	1	(0)

Edgar Galbraith (16 June 1853 — 16 June 1899) was an Irish international rugby union player.

Born in Dublin, Galbraith was a forward with Dublin University Football Club and gained his solitary Ireland cap in the team's first ever international, against England at The Oval in 1875.

Galbraith worked in British India for the Indian Civil Service and was only a few months into his appointment as Commissioner of Agra when he died of an inflamed liver in 1899.

== See also ==
- List of Ireland national rugby union players
