= Sandy MacDonald (rugby union) =

Rugby union player from Northern Ireland

- Full name: James Alexander MacDonald
- Born: 20 December 1853 Newtownards, County Down, Ireland
- Died: 23 April 1928 (aged 74) Taunton, Somerset, England

Rugby union career
- Position: Forward
International career
Years	Team	Apps	(Points)
1875–84	Ireland	13	(0)

James Alexander MacDonald (20 December 1853 — 23 April 1928) was an Irish international rugby union player.

Born in Newtownards, County Down, MacDonald was a pioneer of Irish rugby football and gained 13 caps as a front row forward for Ireland, including their first international against England in 1875. He captained the team his last year in 1884 and retired as Ireland's caps-record holder, later surpassed by Charles Rooke.

MacDonald also played association football for Cliftonville FC.

A physician, MacDonald attained medical degrees from Queen's College, Belfast, and the Royal University of Ireland. He had a medical practice in Taunton, Somerset, and served as chairman of the Council of the British Medical Association.

== See also ==
- List of Ireland national rugby union players
