= Ted Ryan (rugby union) =

Irish rugby union player

- Full name: Edmund Gerald Ryan
- Born: 14 July 1912 Scarriff, County Clare, Ireland
- Died: 14 February 1992 (aged 79) Stamullen, County Meath, Ireland

Rugby union career
- Position: Prop
International career
Years	Team	Apps	(Points)
1937–38	Ireland	3	(0)

Edmund Gerald Ryan (14 July 1912 — 14 February 1992) was an Irish international rugby union player.

A Scarriff-born banker, Ryan played his rugby in Cork with Dolphin RFC and made his debut for Ireland in 1937, as a member of their front row in a win over Wales at Belfast. He gained a further two caps in 1938, against England and Scotland, before rugby was paused during the war.

Ryan later worked in Dundalk and during the 1970s served as president of Dundalk RFC.

== See also ==
- List of Ireland national rugby union players
