= Hercules Beresford-Knox =

Irish rugby union player

- Full name: Hercules John Beresford-Knox
- Born: 2 August 1880 Gortnor Abbey, County Mayo, Ireland
- Died: 10 March 1975 (aged 94) Liverpool, England

Rugby union career
- Position: Forward
International career
| Years | Team | Apps | (Points) |
| 1904–08 | Ireland | 10 | (0) |

Hercules John Beresford-Knox (2 August 1880 — 10 March 1975) was an Irish international rugby union player.

Born in County Mayo, Beresford-Knox was educated at the High School, Dublin, and Trinity College Dublin, where he studied medicine. He played varsity rugby and also competed for Lansdowne. From 1904 to 1908, Beresford-Knox was capped 10 times as a forward for Ireland, which included a match against the touring 1905-06 All Blacks.

Beresford-Knox had a medical practice on Rodney Street in Liverpool.

== See also ==
- List of Ireland national rugby union players
