= Leo Lynch =

Irish rugby union player

- Full name: Michael Leo Lynch
- Born: 7 May 1930 Dublin, Ireland
- Died: 9 November 2023 (aged 93)
- School: Castleknock College

Rugby union career
- Position: Lock
International career
Years	Team	Apps	(Points)
1956	Ireland	1	(0)

Michael Leo Lynch (7 May 1930 — 9 November 2023) was an Irish international rugby union player.

An electrical engineer, Lynch was capped for Ireland in a 1956 Five Nations match against Scotland at Lansdowne Road, partnering former Castleknock College schoolmate Brendan Guerin in the second row of the scrum. He played his club rugby for Milltown, Lansdowne and University College Dublin.

== See also ==
- List of Ireland national rugby union players
