= Patrick Healy (rugby union) =

Irish rugby union player

- Born: Limerick, Ireland
- Died: June 1948

Rugby union career
- Position: Forward
International career
Years	Team	Apps	(Points)
1901–04	Ireland	10	(0)

Patrick Healy was an Irish international rugby union player.

A powerfully built Garryowen forward, Healy served as club captain and was capped 10 times in international rugby for Ireland from 1901 to 1904, twice featuring in wins over England.

Healy also an Irish amateur heavyweight boxing champion.

== See also ==
- List of Ireland national rugby union players
