= Ivor Popham =

Irish rugby union player

- Born: County Cork, Ireland
- Died: 28 July 1924 Crosshaven, County Cork, Ireland
- School: CBS Cork

Rugby union career
- Position: Forward
International career
Years	Team	Apps	(Points)
1922–23	Ireland	4	(0)

Ivor Popham was an Irish international rugby union player.

Popham was educated at Christian Brothers College, Cork, where he learned his rugby.

A Cork Constitution wing-forward, Popham was a speedy player with four Ireland caps. He made three appearances in the 1922 Five Nations and played one match of the 1923 Five Nations for Ireland.

== See also ==
- List of Ireland national rugby union players
