= Robert Morrow (rugby union) =

Rugby union player from Northern Ireland

- Full name: J. Robert Whiteside Morrow
- Born: circa 1862 County Down, Ireland
- Died: 25 April 1944

Rugby union career
- Position: Fullback
International career
Years	Team	Apps	(Points)
1882–88	Ireland	10	(0)

J. Robert Whiteside Morrow was an Irish international rugby union player.

A fullback, Morrow could kick with either foot and was a reliable tackler.

Morrow was called up by Ireland from Belfast club Albion and gained a total of 10 caps from 1882 to 1888. His career coincided with an unsuccessful period for Ireland and he finished on the losing team each time he appeared, making him the most capped Irish player not to have won a match. He also played rugby for Lisburn.

== See also ==
- List of Ireland national rugby union players
