= Lawrence Hunter (rugby union) =

Rugby union player from Northern Ireland

- Full name: Lawrence Mervyn Hunter
- Born: 10 October 1943 (age 83) Dunmurry, Northern Ireland

Rugby union career
- Position: Centre
International career
Years	Team	Apps	(Points)
1968	Ireland	2	(0)

Lawrence Mervyn Hunter (born 10 October 1943) is an Irish former international rugby union player.

Born in Dunmurry, County Antrim, Hunter was educated at Wallace High School in Lisburn, where he was a first XV captain in the 1959/60 season. Like his elder brother Raymond, an Ireland cricket and rugby dual-international, Hunter represented Ulster in both sports. He was a fast bowler and played for the Lisburn Cricket Club.

Hunter, a centre, played his rugby with Belfast club Civil Service. He won two Ireland caps, debuting against Wales in the 1968 Five Nations. His other cap came later that year in Ireland's win over the touring Wallabies at Lansdowne Road.

== See also ==
- List of Ireland national rugby union players
