= Thomas Stevenson (rugby union) =

Rugby union player from Northern Ireland

- Full name: Thomas Herbert Stevenson
- Born: 19 August 1872 Derry, Ireland
- Died: 21 March 1908 (aged 35) Woolwich, England
- University: Queen's College Belfast; University of Edinburgh
- Occupation: Medical doctor

Rugby union career
- Position: Centre
International career
Years	Team	Apps	(Points)
1895–97	Ireland	7	(3)

Thomas Herbert Stevenson (19 August 1872 — 21 March 1908) was an Irish international rugby union player.

Born in Derry, Stevenson was a strong-running centre, capped seven times for Ireland from 1895 to 1897, having made his mark competing in varsity rugby. He played for Queen's College Belfast and later Edinburgh University, from where he obtained his medical qualifications.

Stevenson received a commission as a lieutenant in the Royal Army Medical Corps (RAMC) in 1900 and served six years in India. He was promoted to captain in 1903 and at the end of that year was one of four RAMC members to accompany the British expedition to Tibet.

In 1908, Stevenson died when he developed blood poisoning after undergoing an operation, aged 35.

== See also ==
- List of Ireland national rugby union players
