= Don Hingerty =

Irish rugby union player

- Full name: Donal Joseph Hingerty
- Born: 11 January 1920 Dublin, Ireland
- Died: 12 December 2007 (aged 87)
- School: O'Connell School
- University: University College Dublin
- Notable relative: Dave Hingerty (son)
- Occupation: Professor

Rugby union career
- Position: Wing-forward
International career
Years	Team	Apps	(Points)
1947	Ireland	4	(0)

Donal Joseph Hingerty (11 January 1920 — 12 December 2007) was an Irish international rugby union player.

Educated at O'Connell School in Dublin, Hingerty played rugby for University College Dublin and debuted for Ireland in a 1945 wartime international, before making three further unofficial appearances in 1946. He was capped officially in the 1947 Five Nations, where he played all four of Ireland's fixtures.

Hingerty was a Professor of Biochemistry at University College Dublin.

== See also ==
- List of Ireland national rugby union players
