= Godfrey Pinion =

Rugby union player from Northern Ireland

- Born: 13 September 1884 Belfast, Ireland
- Died: 7 December 1956 (aged 72) Belfast, Northern Ireland

Rugby union career
- Position: Fly-half
International career
Years	Team	Apps	(Points)
1909	Ireland	4	(2)

Godfrey Pinion (13 September 1884 — 7 December 1956) was an Irish international rugby union player.

Pinion was educated at Methodist College Belfast and earned Ulster Schools representative honours. Soon after finishing school, Pinion relocated to Liverpool, where he was at first employed by the Mersey Docks and Harbour Company.

A fly-half, Pinion played rugby for Liverpool and Birkenhead Park from 1904 to 1909, making several appearances with Lancashire, before returning to Belfast. He competed for Belfast club Collegians and was capped four times as a fly-half for Ireland in the 1909 Home Nations Championship.

Pinion worked as an executive in the insurance industry.

== See also ==
- List of Ireland national rugby union players
