= Robert Dunlop (rugby union) =

Irish rugby player

Robert Dunlop CBE
- Born: Belfast, Ireland
- Died: 30 November 1935 Larne, Northern Ireland
- University: Trinity College Dublin
- Occupation: Police officer

Rugby union career
- Position: Three-quarter
International career
Years	Team	Apps	(Points)
1889–94	Ireland	11	(1)

Robert Dunlop was an Irish international rugby union player.

A Belfast native, Dunlop was a varsity rugby player for Dublin University FC during his studies at Trinity College Dublin and gained 11 Ireland caps as a three-quarter, which included a match in their 1894 triple crown.

Dunlop entered the Royal Irish Constabulary as a cadet in 1893 and later joined the Royal Ulster Constabulary upon its formation. After the murder of Gerald Smyth in 1920, Dunlop was chosen to succeed him as Divisioner Commissioner for Cork and Kerry. He was based in County Antrim at the time of his retirement in 1929.

In 1935, Dunlop died of a seizure at his home in Larne. His death occurred two days after his wife's funeral.

== See also ==
- List of Ireland national rugby union players
