= Jerry Mullane =

Irish rugby union player

- Full name: Jeremiah Patrick Mullane
- Born: 30 April 1906 Ballagh, Newcastle West, County Limerick, Ireland
- Died: 7 April 1930 (aged 23) South Infirmary Cork, County Cork, Ireland
- School: Blackrock College
- University: University College Cork
- Occupation: Creamery Manager (Bruree)

Rugby union career
- Position: Wing-forward
Senior career
Years	Team	Apps	(Points)
–	Newcastle West and Bohemians		
International career
Years	Team	Apps	(Points)
1928	Ireland	2	(0)

Jeremiah Patrick Mullane (1906–1930) was an Irish international rugby union player.

A native of Ballagh, Killeedy, County Limerick, Mullane attended Blackrock College, where he was rugby captain, and subsequently studied dairy science at University College Cork. He played rugby for Munster, University College Cork and Limerick clubs Newcastle West and Bohemians.

Mullane got his Ireland opportunity in 1928 as a replacement for forward Charles Hanrahan, whose brother had been killed in an accident playing rugby. He debuted as a wing-forward against Wales in Cardiff and gained a second cap in an end of year match against France in Paris.

In 1930, Mullane died of a sudden illness in Cork, at the age of 23.

== See also ==
- List of Ireland national rugby union players
