= Frederick Williamson (rugby union) =

Irish rugby union player

- Full name: Frederick William Williamson
- Born: 25 January 1905 Wexford, Ireland
- Died: 13 May 1995 (aged 90) Richmond, England

Rugby union career
- Position: Centre/ Fullback
International career
Years	Team	Apps	(Points)
1930	Ireland	3	(0)

Frederick William Williamson (25 January 1905 — 13 May 1995) was an Irish international rugby union player.

Although primarily a centre three-quarter, Williamson was called upon by Ireland in 1930 to succeed Joe Stewart at fullback and gained three caps. He was the first Ireland back to be selected from Dolphin RFC.

Williamson later played rugby for Wanderers in Dublin.

== See also ==
- List of Ireland national rugby union players
