= Harry Irvine =

Rugby union player from Northern Ireland

- Full name: Henry Augustus Stewart Irvine
- Born: 24 March 1875 Belfast, Ireland
- Died: 8 August 1943 (aged 68) Transvaal, South Africa

Rugby union career
- Position: Forward
International career
| Years | Team | Apps | (Points) |
| 1901 | Ireland | 1 | (2) |

Henry Augustus Stewart Irvine (24 March 1875 – 8 August 1943) was an Irish international rugby union player.

Born in Belfast, Irvine was the son of Canon Richard Irvine and attended Methodist College Belfast.

Irvine served as a lieutenant in the Northern Ireland Yeomanry during the Second Boer War, where he was involved in the sieges of Ladysmith and Maffeking. While in South Africa, Irvine played rugby for Griqualand West, featuring against the touring British Lions. He played for Collegians when he returned to Belfast on sick leave and was capped for Ireland against Scotland at Inverleith in 1901, kicking a conversion for his side in a losing cause. A second cap eluded him as he had to return to the war. He ended up settling in Transvaal, working for their Department of Native Affairs.

== See also ==
- List of Ireland national rugby union players
