= William Morton (rugby union) =

Irish rugby union player

- Full name: William Andrews Morton
- Born: 20 July 1866 Nenagh, County Tipperary, Ireland
- Died: 19 March 1948 (aged 81) County Offaly, Ireland

Rugby union career
- Position: Forward
International career
Years	Team	Apps	(Points)
1888	Ireland	1	(0)

William Andrews Morton (20 July 1866 — 19 March 1948) was an Irish international rugby union player.

Born in Nenagh, County Tipperary, Morton attended St Columba's College and Trinity College Dublin.

Morton was a doctor by profession and had a medical practice in Birr, County Offaly. He captained the Birr Football Club and gained his solitary Ireland cap in 1888, as a forward against Scotland at Edinburgh.

== See also ==
- List of Ireland national rugby union players
