= Mick Madden (rugby union) =

Irish rugby union player

- Full name: Michael N. Madden
- Born: 24 November 1929 Cork, Ireland
- Died: 26 August 2012 (aged 82) Killarney, Ireland

Rugby union career
- Position: Lock
International career
Years	Team	Apps	(Points)
1955	Ireland	3	(0)

Michael N. Madden (24 November 1929 — 26 August 2012) was an Irish international rugby union player.

A powerful second row forward, Madden played rugby for Sundays Well in his native Cork and gained three Ireland caps during the 1955 Five Nations. He missed the opening fixture, then came into the Ireland side against England after their captain Robin Thompson withdrew, and did well enough to retain his place for the two remaining matches.

== See also ==
- List of Ireland national rugby union players
