= Harry Spunner =

Irish rugby union player

- Full name: Henry Francis Spunner
- Born: 1846 or 1847 County Tipperary, Ireland
- Died: 28 June 1903 (aged 56 or 57) Cork, Ireland

Rugby union career
- Position: Halfback / Centre
International career
Years	Team	Apps	(Points)
1881–84	Ireland	3	(0)

Henry Francis Spunner was an Irish international rugby union player.

Born in County Tipperary, Spunner was a foundation player for Wanderers, a club in Dublin. He gained three Ireland caps, playing as a halfback against England and Scotland in 1881, then as a centre three-quarter against Wales in 1884.

Spunner left Dublin in the late 1880s and became a land agent in Cork.

== See also ==
- List of Ireland national rugby union players
