= Alfred Brunker =

Irish rugby union player

- Full name: Alfred Arthur Brunker
- Born: 15 February 1875 Rathmines, County Dublin, Ireland
- Died: 24 August 1946 (aged 71) Dublin, Ireland

Rugby union career
- Position: Forward
International career
Years	Team	Apps	(Points)
1895	Ireland	2	(0)

Alfred Arthur Brunker (15 February 1875 – 24 August 1946) was an Irish international rugby union player.

Raised in Dublin, Brunker was a forward with the city's Lansdowne club and gained two Ireland caps. He made both of his international appearances in 1895, playing matches against England at Lansdowne Road and Wales at Cardiff.

Brunker served as captain of the Royal Dublin Golf Club.

A businessman by profession, Brunker was the Dublin Chamber of Commerce president in his later years.

== See also ==
- List of Ireland national rugby union players
