= George Henebrey =

Irish rugby union player

- Full name: George Joseph Henebrey
- Born: 16 February 1879 Windgap, County Kilkenny, Ireland
- Died: 22 February 1945 (aged 66) Walton-on-Thames, Surrey, England

Rugby union career
- Position: Fullback
International career
Years	Team	Apps	(Points)
1906–09	Ireland	6	(0)

George Joseph Henebrey (16 February 1879 — 22 February 1945) was an Irish international rugby union player.

Henebrey was born in Windgap, County Kilkenny, and educated at Rockwell College.

A fullback, Henebrey was capped six times for Ireland between 1906 and 1909, which included a match against the touring 1906–07 Springboks. He played his club rugby for Garryowen and Lansdowne.

Henebrey left for Brazil in 1911 and on his return five years later served with the Royal Navy as a paymaster. He subsequently moved to Walton-on-Thames, where he was a bank manager.

== See also ==
- List of Ireland national rugby union players
