= Des Torrens =

Irish rugby union player

- Full name: John Desmond Torrens
- Born: 10 March 1915 Ennis, County Clare, Ireland
- Died: 8 July 1981 (aged 66) Biggleswade, Bedfordshire, England

Rugby union career
- Position: Centre
International career
| Years | Team | Apps | (Points) |
| 1938–39 | Ireland | 4 | (3) |

John Desmond Torrens (10 March 1915 — 8 July 1981) was an Irish international rugby union player.

A native of Ennis, Torrens played for Limerick club UL Bohemians and Liskeard in Cornwall.

Torrens was primarily an out-half but gained his four Ireland caps as a centre. He made his debut against Wales in 1938 and made three appearances the following year, scoring a try in their win over Scotland.

== See also ==
- List of Ireland national rugby union players
