= Robert Lyle (rugby union) =

Rugby union player from Northern Ireland

- Full name: Robert Knox Lyle
- Born: 22 June 1884 Antrim, Ireland
- Died: 25 June 1968 (aged 84) Belfast, Northern Ireland

Rugby union career
- Position: Centre
International career
Years	Team	Apps	(Points)
1910	Ireland	2	(0)

Robert Knox Lyle (22 June 1884 — 25 June 1968) was an Irish international rugby union player.

Lyle was born at Muckamore Manse in Antrim and attended Dublin's St Andrew's College.

A centre three-quarter, Lyle played rugby for Dublin University during his studies at Trinity College, from where he gained his two Ireland caps, appearing against Wales and France.

Lyle went to Princeton Theological Seminary in the United States. After being ordained in 1913, Lyle served as a missionary in Manchuria. He was a minister at Greystones, County Wicklow from 1927 to 1952, as well as a one-time Moderator of Dublin Synod of the Presbyterian Church.

== See also ==
- List of Ireland national rugby union players
