= Thomas Corken =

- Full name: Thomas Samuel Corken
- Born: 15 September 1910 Lisburn, Antrim, Ireland
- School: Methodist College Belfast

Rugby union career
- Position: Hooker
International career
| Years | Team | Apps | (Points) |
| 1937 | Ireland | 3 | (0) |

Thomas Samuel Corken (born 15 September 1910) was an Irish international rugby union player.

Corken was a native of Lisburn and attended Methodist College Belfast.

A hooker, Corken was capped three times for Ireland through the 1937 Home Nations, making his debut against England at Twickenham. He played his rugby for Collegians and was also a cricketer of note.

== See also ==
- List of Ireland national rugby union players
