= Alfred Atkins =

Irish rugby union player

- Full name: Alfred Patrick Atkins
- Born: 9 April 1900 Dublin, Ireland
- Died: 25 March 1979 (aged 78) Biddenham, England

Rugby union career
- Position: Three-quarter
International career
Years	Team	Apps	(Points)
1924	Ireland	1	(3)

Alfred Patrick Atkins (9 April 1900 — 25 March 1979) was an Irish international rugby union player.

Atkins was born in Dublin and educated at Belvedere College. During World War I, Atkins served with the Royal Flying Corps as a pilot and was badly injured in a plane crash.

A three-quarter, Atkins was a noted place kicker and played for Bective Rangers. He scored a try from the wing in his only appearance for Ireland, a win over France at Lansdowne Road in 1923.

== See also ==
- List of Ireland national rugby union players
