= Geoffrey Schute =

Irish rugby union player

- Full name: Frederick Geoffrey Schute
- Born: 5 October 1890 Dublin North, Ireland
- Died: circa 1956

Rugby union career
- Position: Forward
International career
Years	Team	Apps	(Points)
1912–13	Ireland	3	(3)

Frederick Geoffrey Schute (born 5 October 1890) was an Irish international rugby union player.

Schute was born in Dublin North and attended Dublin University, where he played rugby.

A forward, Schute was a son of former player Frederick Schute and the two were the first father son combination to represent Ireland. He debuted in Ireland's match against the 1912–13 Springboks at Lansdowne Road.

Schute immigrated to Australia in 1914, but returned to Europe soon after, serving in Flanders with the Royal Irish Fusiliers during World War I. His brother John Hartley Schute was killed in action.

== See also ==
- List of Ireland national rugby union players
