= Thomas Johnson-Smyth =

Rugby union player from Northern Ireland

- Full name: Thomas Roger Johnson-Smyth
- Born: 12 June 1857 Lisburn, Ireland
- Died: 5 February 1900 (aged 42) Natal, South Africa

Rugby union career
- Position: Forward
International career
Years	Team	Apps	(Points)
1882	Ireland	1	(0)

Thomas Roger Johnson-Smyth (12 June 1857 — 5 February 1900) was an Irish international rugby union player.

Born in Lisburn, Johnson-Smyth was a forward and gained his solitary Ireland cap against England at Lansdowne Road in 1882. He served as a captain with the Frontier Field Force in Sudan during the 1880s. In the Second Boer War, Johnson-Smyth was a major in the 1st Battalion of the Durham Light Infantry and was killed in the Battle of Vaal Krantz.

== See also ==
- List of Ireland national rugby union players
