= Jack Molony =

Irish rugby union player

- Full name: Jack Ursala Molony
- Born: 21 October 1924 Thurles, Ireland
- Died: 9 September 2008 (aged 83) Donnybrook, Dublin, Ireland

Rugby union career
- Position: Second row
International career
Years	Team	Apps	(Points)
1950	Ireland	1	(0)

Jack Ursala Molony (21 October 1924 — 9 September 2008) was an Irish international rugby union player.

Molony attended CBS Thurles and Roscrea College, then studied medicine at University College Dublin, where he won a Leinster Senior Cup as a varsity rugby player in 1948. He also competed for Bective Rangers, Leinster and was capped once for Ireland, playing in the second row against Scotland at Lansdowne Road during the 1950 Five Nations.

A doctor, Molony specialised in the field of rheumatology.

Molony's grandson, Ross Molony, played for Leinster and Ireland Wolfhounds.

== See also ==
- List of Ireland national rugby union players
