= Edward Morphy =

Irish rugby union player

Edward Morphy MC
- Full name: Edward MacGillicuddy Morphy
- Born: 28 January 1886 Dublin, Ireland
- Died: 16 July 1925 (aged 39) Beaufort, North Borneo

Rugby union career
- Position: Forward
International career
Years	Team	Apps	(Points)
1908	Ireland	1	(0)

Edward MacGillicuddy Morphy (28 January 1886 – 16 July 1925) was an Irish international rugby union player.

The son of a judge, Morphy was a forward and gained a single Ireland cap, featuring against England at Richmond in the 1908 Home Nations. He played his club rugby for Dublin University, for which he was active until 1910.

Morphy served as an officer in the Royal Garrison Artillery and received the Military Cross during World War I.

== See also ==
- List of Ireland national rugby union players
