= John Cuppaidge =

Irish rugby union player

- Full name: John Loftus Cuppaidge
- Born: 25 December 1856 Dublin, Ireland
- Died: 23 September 1934 (aged 77) Brisbane, Queensland, Australia
- University: Trinity College Dublin
- Occupation: Doctor

Rugby union career
- Position: Forward
International career
Years	Team	Apps	(Points)
1879–80	Ireland	3	(0)

John Loftus Cuppaidge (25 December 1856 — 23 September 1934) was an Irish international rugby union player.

Cuppaidge was born in Dublin and educated at Trinity College Dublin, where he played varsity rugby while studying medicine. He gained three caps for Ireland as a forward.

Emigrating to Australia in 1884, Cuppaidge had medical practises in the Queensland towns of Roma and Gympie. He remained in Australia for the remainder of his life, except for six years as a doctor in Totnes, Devon, around the turn of the century. While in Gympie, Cuppaidge served as commander of the 5th Light Horse Field Ambulance. He established a base hospital in Townsville at the beginning of the war.

== See also ==
- List of Ireland national rugby union players
