= Patrick O'Connor (rugby union) =

Irish rugby union player

- Full name: Patrick John O'Connor
- Born: 18 April 1863
- Died: 26 December 1919 (aged 56)

Rugby union career
- Position: Halfback
International career
Years	Team	Apps	(Points)
1887	Ireland	1	(0)

Patrick John O'Connor (18 April 1863 — 26 December 1919) was an Irish international rugby union player.

Raised in Dublin, O'Connor attended Clondalkin College and Blackrock College.

O'Connor played for Dublin club Lansdowne, forming a halfback partnership with the 15-times capped Robert Warren, with whom he also teamed with for his solitary Ireland cap in 1887, against Wales at Birkenhead.

An auctioneer by profession, O'Connor took over his father's Queen street business during the 1880s and became well known around Dublin, specialising in the sale of cattle.

== See also ==
- List of Ireland national rugby union players
