= John Burkitt =

Irish rugby union player

- Full name: John Colley Smyth Burkitt
- Born: 1 July 1860 Kilkee, County Clare, Ireland
- Died: 23 November 1929 (aged 69) Ashby-de-la-Zouch, Leicestershire, England

Rugby union career
- Position: Forward
International career
Years	Team	Apps	(Points)
1881	Ireland	1	(0)

John Colley Smyth Burkitt (1 July 1860 — 23 November 1929) was an Irish international rugby union player.

Born in Kilkee, County Clare, Burkitt was capped for Ireland as a forward in a match against England at Manchester in 1881. He was a doctor by profession and had a medical practice in Whitwick for 40 years. During World War I, Burkitt was a colonel with the Leicestershire Yeomanry and took command of a Field Ambulance brigade in France.

== See also ==
- List of Ireland national rugby union players
