= Cornelius Griffin (rugby union) =

Irish rugby union player (1923–1981)

- Full name: Cornelius Stephen Griffin
- Born: 31 October 1923 St Pancras, London, England
- Died: 16 December 1981 (aged 58) Winchester, England

Rugby union career
- Position: Three-quarter
International career
Years	Team	Apps	(Points)
1951	Ireland	2	(0)

Cornelius Stephen Griffin (31 October 1923 — 16 December 1981) was an Irish international rugby union player.

Born in St Pancras, London, Griffin played for London Irish and capped by Ireland in 1951, as a wing three-quarter for the first two matches of their championship-winning Five Nations campaign.

Griffin joined Havant RFC in 1952 when he relocated to Portsmouth. He later played for Portsmouth RFC, where he took over as captain in 1954. While in Portsmouth, Griffin represented Hampshire.

== See also ==
- List of Ireland national rugby union players
