= William Beatty (rugby union) =

Rugby union player from Northern Ireland

- Full name: William John Beatty
- Born: 23 October 1888 Holywood, County Down, Ireland
- Died: 10 February 1919 (aged 30) Charleroi, Belgium

Rugby union career
- Position: Forward
International career
Years	Team	Apps	(Points)
1910–12	Ireland	3	(0)

William John Beatty (23 October 1888 — 10 February 1919) was an Irish international rugby union player.

Born in Holywood, County Down, Beatty was a forward with London club Richmond, capped three times for Ireland between 1910 and 1912, twice featuring in away wins over France.

Beatty, an Army major, died of pneumonia in 1919, while in Charleroi, Belgium.

== See also ==
- List of Ireland national rugby union players
