= Abraham Cronyn =

Irish rugby union player

- Full name: Abraham Prim Cronyn
- Born: 3 September 1855 Kilkenny, Ireland
- Died: 26 April 1937 (aged 81) Seaford, Sussex, England
- University: Trinity College Dublin.

Rugby union career
- Position: Forward
International career
Years	Team	Apps	(Points)
1875–80	Ireland	3	(0)

Abraham Prim Cronyn (3 September 1855 — 26 April 1937) was an Irish international rugby union player.

== Biography ==
The son of a doctor, Cronyn was an Irish national champion in the quarter-mile and gained three caps as a rugby forward for Ireland, which included the team's first ever international match in 1875.

Cronyn served in the Boer War as an officer with the 97th Regiment.

A member of the clergy, Cronyn was curate of Powerscourt in County Wicklow and Holy Trinity in County Waterford, before serving overseas chaplaincies and later settling in England, moving to Seaford, Sussex, for his retirement.

== See also ==
- List of Ireland national rugby union players
