= William Wallis (rugby union) =

Irish rugby union player

- Full name: William Armstrong Wallis
- Born: 2 July 1856 Dublin, Ireland
- Died: 11 November 1927 (aged 71) Dublin, Ireland

Rugby union career
- Position: Forward
International career
Years	Team	Apps	(Points)
1880–83	Ireland	5	(0)

William Armstrong Wallis (2 July 1856 – 11 November 1927) was an Irish international rugby union player.

A Dublin–born forward, Wallis was capped five times for Ireland during the early 1880s. He played for Dublin club Wanderers and in the 1887/88 season served as their president. In addition to rugby, Wallis was renowned as a horse breeder and trained the 1916 Irish Oaks–winning horse Captive Princess.

== See also ==
- List of Ireland national rugby union players
