= Wally Bornemann =

Irish rugby union player

- Full name: Walter William Bornemann
- Born: 19 January 1936 Dublin, Ireland
- Died: 1 March 2021 (aged 85)

Rugby union career
- Position: Wing
International career
Years	Team	Apps	(Points)
1960	Ireland	4	(0)

Walter William Bornemann (19 January 1936 — 1 March 2021) was an Irish international rugby union player.

Born in Dublin, Bornemann was a Wanderers wing three-quarter and gained selection for Ireland's squad in 1960 on the back of a hat-trick of tries he scored in the final trial match. He featured on a wing in three of their 1960 Five Nations fixtures, as well as a match against the touring Springboks at Lansdowne Road.

Bornemann served as a secretary of Portmarnock Golf Club.

== See also ==
- List of Ireland national rugby union players
