= Snipe Watson =

Irish rugby union player

- Full name: Robert Watson
- Born: Kinsale, County Cork, Ireland
- Died: 7 May 1961 Rathangan, County Kildare, Ireland
- University: Trinity College Dublin
- Occupation: Clergy

Rugby union career
- Position: Wing
International career
Years	Team	Apps	(Points)
1912	Ireland	1	(0)

Robert "Snipe" Watson was an Irish international rugby union player.

A wing three-quarter, Watson played rugby for Wanderers and was capped once for Ireland, appearing against the touring Springboks at Lansdowne Road in 1912. He later served as president of Leinster Rugby.

Watson was a chaplain to the forces in the later stages of World War I and received the Croix de Guerre. He became Canon of Kildare in 1944 and was Rector of Clonsast & Rathangan.

== See also ==
- List of Ireland national rugby union players
