= Reuben Owens =

Irish rugby union player

- Full name: Reuben Hirst Owens
- Born: 19 March 1898 Dublin, Ireland
- Died: 30 August 1973 (aged 75) San Francisco, United States
- University: Trinity College Dublin
- Occupation: Civil engineer

Rugby union career
- Position: Wing-forward
International career
Years	Team	Apps	(Points)
1922	Ireland	2	(0)

Reuben Hirst Owens (19 March 1898 — 30 August 1973) was an Irish international rugby union player.

Owens was a Dublin University wing-forward, capped twice for Ireland in the 1922 Five Nations, playing against England at Lansdowne Road and Scotland at Inverleith. He also represented Ireland at water polo.

A civil engineer, Owens moved to San Francisco during the 1920s to be with his fiancée and worked with City Hall for many year until his appointment as director of Public Works in 1959, four years before he retired.

== See also ==
- List of Ireland national rugby union players
