= Claude Carroll =

Irish rugby union player

- Full name: George Edward Claude Carroll
- Born: 14 April 1908 Thurles, Ireland
- Died: 21 September 1939 (aged 31) Letterkenny, Ireland

Rugby union career
- Position: Lock
International career
Years	Team	Apps	(Points)
1930	Ireland	1	(0)

George Edward Claude Carroll (14 April 1908 — 21 September 1939) was an Irish international rugby union player.

Born in Thurles, Carroll played his rugby for Bective Rangers and was capped once for Ireland, as a forward against France at Belfast in 1930, having received his call up due to selector's desire to add weight to the pack.

Carroll is a distant relation of Ireland scrum-half Peter Stringer, whose grandmother was a first cousin.

== See also ==
- List of Ireland national rugby union players
