= Hugh McCoull =

Rugby union player from Northern Ireland

- Full name: Hugh Charles McCoull
- Born: 20 November 1872 Castlereagh, Down, Ireland
- Died: 10 December 1916 (aged 44) Larne, Down, Ireland

Rugby union career
- Position: Forward
International career
Years	Team	Apps	(Points)
1895–99	Ireland	4	(0)

Hugh Charles McCoull (20 November 1872 – 10 December 1916) was an Irish international rugby union player.

McCoull was born in Castlereagh and educated at Royal Belfast Academical Institution, where he learned his rugby.

After three seasons with Windsor, McCoull made his representative debut for Ulster in 1894. He won his first Ireland call up when he crossed to Belfast Albion the following year, making three appearances in the 1895 Home Nations. A lightly built forward, McCoull didn't return to the side until 1899, as a member of their triple crown–winning campaign. He had spent the intervening years playing association football for Cliftonville.

== See also ==
- List of Ireland national rugby union players
