= Robert E. Forbes =

Irish rugby union player

- Full name: Robert Edwin Forbes
- Born: 11 December 1880 Brentwood, Essex, England
- Died: 2 January 1958 (aged 77) Belfast, Northern Ireland
- Occupation: Civil engineer

Rugby union career
- Position: Forward
International career
Years	Team	Apps	(Points)
1907	Ireland	1	(0)

Robert Edwin Forbes (11 December 1880 — 2 January 1958) was an Irish international rugby union player.

== Biography ==
A civil engineer, Forbes played rugby during his youth for Malone RFC and was capped once for Ireland, featuring as a forward against England at Lansdowne Road in 1907.

Forbes worked for many years at Belfast Corporation (city council), which he joined in 1900. He rose to become estates superintendent of Belfast in 1930 and served in the role until his retirement in 1945.

== See also ==
- List of Ireland national rugby union players
