= Frederick Kidd (rugby union) =

Rugby union player from Northern Ireland

William Kidd
- Full name: Frederick William Kidd
- Born: 3 May 1857 Newry, County Down, Ireland
- Died: 5 September 1917 (aged 60) Dublin, Ireland

Rugby union career
- Position: Three-quarter
International career
Years	Team	Apps	(Points)
1877–78	Ireland	3	(0)

Frederick William Kidd (3 May 1857 — 5 September 1917) was an Irish international rugby union player.

Born in Newry, County Down, Kidd attended Dundalk Academy and Trinity College Dublin. He played his rugby as a three-quarter and had considerable pace, with the 120 yards race being his specialty in varsity athletics. A Lansdowne player, Kidd was capped three times for Ireland during this period.

Kidd was a consulting surgeon and master at Coombe Lying-In Hospital in Dublin. He served as president of the Leinster Branch of the British Medical Association.

== See also ==
- List of Ireland national rugby union players
