= Robert Smith (rugby union, born 1870) =

Irish rugby union player

- Full name: Robert Echlin Smith
- Born: 12 December 1870 Dublin, Ireland
- Died: 2 February 1904 (aged 33) Finchingfield, Essex, England
- Occupation: Physician

Rugby union career
- Position: Forward
International career
Years	Team	Apps	(Points)
1892	Ireland	1	(0)

Robert Echlin Smith (12 December 1870 — 2 February 1904) was an Irish international rugby union player.

A Dublin-born physician, Smith played rugby for Lansdowne and debuted for Ireland in 1892, playing as a forward against England at Manchester, which remained his only international cap.

Smith died in 1904 from injuries sustained when in an attempt to catch a pony he was kicked in the face.

== See also ==
- List of Ireland national rugby union players
