= Joe Pedlow =

Rugby union player from Northern Ireland

- Full name: James Green Pedlow
- Born: 5 October 1862 Edenderry, Ireland
- Died: September 1954 (aged 91) New York, United States

Rugby union career
- Position: Three-quarter
International career
Years	Team	Apps	(Points)
1882–84	Ireland	2	(0)

James Green Pedlow (5 October 1862 – September 1954) was an Irish international rugby union player.

Raised in a Quaker family from Lurgan, Pedlow was the eldest of three brothers to be capped for Ireland, with younger siblings Tom and Robert succeeding him in the national team. He played for Bessbrook and gained two Ireland caps as a three-quarter, debuting against Scotland in Glasgow in 1882.

Pedlow immigrated to the United States in 1885 and got involved in the linen trade. He served on the Western Front with the United States Army during World War I and attained the rank of captain. Post war, Pedlow was based in Budapest as a Red Cross administrator and became Honorary Consul from Hungary to the United States.

== See also ==
- List of Ireland national rugby union players
