= Maurice Landers =

Irish rugby union player

- Full name: Maurice Finbarr Landers
- Born: 15 April 1878 Cork, Ireland
- Died: 7 March 1948 (aged 69) Cork, Ireland

Rugby union career
- Position: Fullback
International career
Years	Team	Apps	(Points)
1904–05	Ireland	5	(0)

Maurice Finbarr Landers (15 April 1878 – 7 March 1948) was an Irish international rugby union player.

The son of a wine merchant, Landers grew up in Cork and played his rugby for Cork Constitution, where he was initially a forward, before establishing himself as a fullback. He was capped five times for Ireland, making his last appearance against New Zealand at Lansdowne Road in 1905. His time with Cork Constitution included a period as club captain and their three successive Munster Senior Cup wins from 1905 to 1907.

Landers was a turf accountant by profession and remained involved in rugby union as an administrator, serving on the selection committees for Munster and Ireland, as well having a term as president of Cork Constitution.

== See also ==
- List of Ireland national rugby union players
