= Ronnie Craig =

Rugby union player from Northern Ireland

- Full name: Ronald Gavin Craig
- Born: 14 April 1916 Belfast, Ireland
- Died: 1 June 2009 (aged 93) Belfast, Northern Ireland
- University: Queen's University
- Occupation: Presbyterian minister

Rugby union career
- Position: Fullback
International career
Years	Team	Apps	(Points)
1938	Ireland	2	(0)

Ronald Gavin Craig (14 April 1916 — 1 June 2009) was an Irish international rugby union player.

== Biography ==
Born in Belfast, Craig gained two Ireland caps as a 21-year old Queen's University student, playing fullback for matches against Scotland at Murrayfield and Wales at Swansea. He also played in Belfast for North of Ireland and later joined Armagh, kicking the winning penalty goal in the 1947 Ulster Towns Cup final against Bangor.

Craig was a Presbyterian minister and served as a moderator of the Presbyterian Church in Ireland. His church commitments limited his promising cricket career with Woodvale as he was unable to play on Sundays.

== See also ==
- List of Ireland national rugby union players
