= Bill O'Connell (rugby union) =

Irish rugby union player

- Full name: William Joseph O'Connell
- Born: 22 April 1930 Limerick, Ireland

Rugby union career
- Position: Lock
International career
Years	Team	Apps	(Points)
1955	Ireland	1	(0)

William Joseph O'Connell (born 22 April 1930) is an Irish former international rugby union player.

A native of Limerick, O'Connell was the first Ireland cap produced by St Munchin's College.

O'Connell, a bank clerk, gained his only cap for Ireland against France at Lansdowne Road during the 1955 Five Nations, deputising Tom Reid in the second row. He lost his place when Reid returned for the next match.

== See also ==
- List of Ireland national rugby union players
