= Henry Morell =

Rugby union player from Northern Ireland

- Full name: Henry Brown Morell
- Born: 15 October 1858 Dungannon, Tyrone, Ireland
- Died: 21 March 1934 (aged 75) Rathdrum, Wicklow, Ireland

Rugby union career
- Position: Forward
International career
Years	Team	Apps	(Points)
1881–82	Ireland	4	(0)

Henry Brown Morell (15 October 1858 – 21 March 1934) was an Irish international rugby union player.

Born in Dungannon, Morell was the son of local Presbyterian minister Charles Lucas Morell, who was a one–time moderator of the General Assembly.

Morell, known in rugby circles as "Barney", was capped four times for Ireland, which included their first ever Test match win, over Scotland in 1881. He played his club rugby for Dublin University.

A police officer, Morell served as an Inspector with the Royal Irish Constabulary and had charge of the Musgrave Street barracks in Belfast. He was later County Inspector for Wicklow.

== See also ==
- List of Ireland national rugby union players
