= James Gardiner (rugby union) =

Rugby union player from Northern Ireland

- Full name: John Burnett Gardiner
- Born: 27 October 1902 Belfast, Ireland
- Died: 11 April 1961 (aged 58) George, South Africa
- School: Campbell College
- Notable relative: Fred Gardiner (uncle)

Rugby union career
- Position: Centre
International career
Years	Team	Apps	(Points)
1923–25	Ireland	13	(3)

John Burnett Gardiner (27 October 1902 — 11 April 1961) was an Irish international rugby union player.

Born in Belfast, Gardiner was the nephew of Ireland forward Fred Gardiner and attended Campbell College.

Gardiner played with Belfast club North of Ireland and was capped 13 times for Ireland from 1923 to 1925. He was utilised by Ireland as a centre three-quarter, although he was at scrum-half on his debut match.

Emigrating to Southern Rhodesia, Gardiner played some rugby for the British colony and became a cattle rancher.

== See also ==
- List of Ireland national rugby union players
