= George Phipps (rugby union) =

Irish rugby union player

- Full name: George Constantine Phipps
- Born: 2 November 1927 Peshawar, British India

Rugby union career
- Position: Three-quarter
International career
Years	Team	Apps	(Points)
1950–52	Ireland	5	(0)

George Constantine Phipps (born 2 November 1927) is an Irish former international rugby union player.

Born in Peshawar, Phipps was educated in England, attending Wellington College.

Phipps served with the British Army like his father, a member of the Royal Army Medical Corps. An officer in the Royal Hampshire Regiment, Phipps played his rugby for English club Rosslyn Park, as well as the Army. He was capped five times for Ireland as a three-quarter, debuting against England at Twickenham in the 1950 Five Nations.

== See also ==
- List of Ireland national rugby union players
