= William Riordan (rugby union) =

Irish rugby union player

- Full name: William Francis Riordan
- Born: 30 August 1883
- Died: 11 July 1937 (aged 53)

Rugby union career
- Position: Forward
International career
Years	Team	Apps	(Points)
1910	Ireland	1	(0)

William Francis Riordan (30 August 1883 – 11 July 1937) was an Irish international rugby union player.

A Cork Constitution forward, Riordan debuted for Ireland as a member of their pack which held England to a 0–0 draw at Twickenham in 1910. He would have played in their subsequent fixture against Scotland if not for a knee injury and this remained his only cap. Other than rugby, Riordan was also an oarsman of note. He rowed for the Cork Boat Club at the Cork regatta and one of the crew which captured the 1905 Leander Cup.

Riordan was proprietor of a licensed premises on Copley Street, Cork.

== See also ==
- List of Ireland national rugby union players
