= Standish Cagney =

Irish rugby union player

Standish John Cagney
- Born: 29 June 1900
- Died: 9 May 1962 (aged 61)
- Occupation: rugby union player

Standish John Cagney (29 June 1900 – 9 May 1962) was a rugby union player. He played thirteen tests for the Ireland national rugby union team. His club team was London Irish RFC.
