= Arthur Horan =

Irish rugby union player

Arthur Horan (13 October 1886 - 15 January 1970) was an Irish rugby union scrum-half who won two caps for the Ireland national rugby team in 1920.

He made his debut on 14 February 1920 against England (one of 11 Irish debutants that day), with his final appearance for the side coming on 13 March 1920 against Wales. He was born in Hackney, London and died in Lewisham.
