= William Pike (rugby union) =

Irish rugby union player

Sir William Pike KCMG DSO
- Full name: William Watson Pike
- Born: 10 March 1860 Glendararry, County Mayo, Ireland
- Died: 26 June 1941 (aged 81) Lincoln, Lincolnshire, England

Rugby union career
- Position: Three-quarter
International career
Years	Team	Apps	(Points)
1879–83	Ireland	5	(0)

Sir William Watson Pike (10 March 1860 — 26 June 1941) was an Irish international rugby union player.

== Biography ==
Born in Glendararry, County Mayo, Pike was capped five times for Ireland as a three-quarter from 1879 to 1883, and also represented Ireland as a field hockey player.

Pike served in the Second Boer War and was Director of Medical Services with the 1st British Army Expeditionary Force in World War I, during which he was made a Knight Commander of the Order of St Michael and St George.

== See also ==
- List of Ireland national rugby union players
