= Thomas Halpin (rugby union) =

Irish rugby union player

- Died: January 1954 (aged 70)

Rugby union career
- Position: Forward
International career
Years	Team	Apps	(Points)
1909–12	Ireland	13	(0)

Thomas Halpin was an Irish international rugby union player.

A plumber from Limerick, Halpin was capped 13 times as a forward for Ireland from 1909 to 1912.

Halpin captained Limerick club Garryowen and was also an oarsman of some renown.

Following an accident, Halpin had a leg amputated in the late 1940s, before his death in 1954 at age 70.

== See also ==
- List of Ireland national rugby union players
