= James Bristow =

Rugby union player from Northern Ireland

- Full name: James Rippingham Bristow
- Born: 4 October 1858 Liverpool, England
- Died: 4 April 1925 (aged 66) Belfast, Northern Ireland

Rugby union career
- Position: Forward
International career
Years	Team	Apps	(Points)
1879	Ireland	1	(0)

James Rippingham Bristow (4 October 1858 — 4 April 1925) was an Irish international rugby union player.

Bristow grew up in a Belfast family with Yorkshire origins. He was educated at Royal Belfast Academical Institution and Uppingham School. In 1879, Bristow was capped for Ireland in a match against England at The Oval. He was also a cricketer of note with the North of Ireland CC and in 1880 opened the batting for a Northern Irish team against the touring Australian national team, with Fred Spofforth claiming his wicket twice.

A banker, Bristow had 49 years with the Northern Banking Company and for the majority of his time there held management positions. He was a senior director and served as chairman of the board.
