= Michael Garry =

Irish rugby union player

- Full name: Michael Gerald Garry
- Born: Shanahea, Kildysart, County Clare, Ireland
- Died: 17 September 1967 (aged 80) Liverpool, Lancashire, England

Rugby union career
- Position: Forward
International career
| Years | Team | Apps | (Points) |
| 1909–11 | Ireland | 7 | (0) |

Michael Gerald Garry was an Irish international rugby union player.

A native of County Clare, Garry was a doctor by profession and played his club rugby for Bective Rangers, from where he was capped seven times as a forward for Ireland between 1909 and 1911.

Garry's brother Joseph died in the sinking of the RMS Lusitania.

Settling in Lancashire, Garry was for over three decades the Medical Officer of Health for the town of Formby.

== See also ==
- List of Ireland national rugby union players
