= Norman Potterton =

Irish rugby union player

- Full name: Henry Norman Potterton
- Born: 3 April 1897 Dublin, Ireland
- Died: 2 February 1980 (aged 82) County Meath, Ireland

Rugby union career
- Position: No. 8
International career
Years	Team	Apps	(Points)
1920	Ireland	1	(0)

Henry Norman Potterton (3 April 1897 — 2 February 1980) was an Irish international rugby union player.

Based in Dublin, Potterton captained the city's Wanderers club. He enlisted with the Ulster Division in 1914, despite being underage, and during the war saw active service in France, where he drove an ambulance. In 1920, Potterton was capped for Ireland in a Five Nations match against Wales at Cardiff, as a back row forward.

== See also ==
- List of Ireland national rugby union players
