= William Hogg (rugby union) =

Irish rugby union player (1861–1941)

- Born: 31 October 1861 Granitefield, Dublin, Ireland
- Died: 30 July 1941 (aged 79) South Dublin, Ireland
- University: Trinity College Dublin
- Occupation: Civil engineer / Merchant

Rugby union career
- Position: Forward
International career
| Years | Team | Apps | (Points) |
| 1885 | Ireland | 1 | (0) |

William Hogg (31 October 1861 — 30 July 1941) was an Irish international rugby union player.

Hogg was born in Granitefield, Dublin, and educated at Trinity College Dublin. He gained an Ireland cap during his university studies, playing amongst the forwards against Wales at Edinburgh in 1885. A civil engineer by profession, Hogg was later involved in business, as managing director of a tea and wine merchants.

== See also ==
- List of Ireland national rugby union players
