= Dermot Morris =

Irish rugby union player

- Full name: Dermot Patrick Morris
- Born: 31 January 1908 Dublin, Ireland

Rugby union career
- Position: Fullback
International career
Years	Team	Apps	(Points)
1931–35	Ireland	6	(0)

Dermot Patrick Morris was an Irish international rugby union player.

Born in Dublin, Morris was a Bective Rangers fullback capped six times for Ireland, debuting in 1931. He appeared in all of Ireland's matches at the 1935 Home Nations, after having only been capped once since his debut on account of injuries.

Morris also competed in golf tournaments and featured at the Irish Amateur Open Championship.

Post rugby, Morris practised as a solicitor in Trim, County Meath.

== See also ==
- List of Ireland national rugby union players
