= 1948 Five Nations Championship =

Rugby union competition

- Date: 17 January - 29 March 1948
- Countries: England; France; Ireland; Scotland; Wales

Tournament statistics
- Champions: Ireland (5th title)
- Grand Slam: Ireland (1st title)
- Triple Crown: Ireland (3rd title)
- Matches played: 10

The 1948 Five Nations Championship was the nineteenth series of the rugby union Five Nations Championship. Including the previous incarnations as the Home Nations and Five Nations, this was the fifty-fourth series of the northern hemisphere rugby union championship. Ten matches were played between 17 January and 29 March. It was contested by England, France, Ireland, Scotland and Wales. The tournament was won by Ireland, who achieved a Grand Slam by defeating all the other participants, a feat they would not accomplish again until 2009 and their first on home soil.

== Participants ==
The teams involved were:

Nation	Venue	City	Captain
England	Twickenham	London	Tommy Kemp/Edward Scott/Bob Weighill
France	Stade Olympique Yves-du-Manoir	Colombes	Guy Basquet
Ireland	Lansdowne Road/Ravenhill Stadium	Dublin/Belfast	Ernest Strathdee/Karl Mullen
Scotland	Murrayfield	Edinburgh	Donny Innes
Wales	National Stadium	Cardiff	Haydn Tanner

== Table ==
Pos	Team	Pld	W	D	L	PF	PA	PD	Pts
1	Ireland	4	4	0	0	36	19	+17	8
2	France	4	2	0	2	40	25	+15	4
2	Scotland	4	2	0	2	15	31	−16	4
4	Wales	4	1	1	2	23	20	+3	3
5	England	4	0	1	3	16	35	−19	1

== Results ==
1 January 1948

France	6–13	Ireland
Try: Soro; Basquet	Report	Try: Reid; McCarthy; Mullan; Con: Mullan (2)

Stade Olympique de Colombes, Paris

Teams

FB	15	Lucien Rouffia (US Romans)
RW	14	Mick Pomathios (SU Agen)
OC	13	Michel Sorondo (US Montauban)
IC	12	Maurice Terreau (US Bourg)
LW	11	Pierre Jeanjean (RC Toulon)
FH	10	André Alvarez (US Tyrosse)
SH	9	Gerard Dufau (RC France)
N8	8	Guy Basquet (SU Agen)
OF	7	Jean Prat (FC Lourdes)
BF	6	Jean Matheu-Cambas (Castres Olympique)
RL	5	Alban Moga (CA Begles)
LL	4	Robert Soro (US Romans)
TP	3	Lucien Caron (Castres Olympique)
HK	2	Lucien Martin (Section Paloise)
LP	1	Eugène Buzy (FC Lourdes)
Coach:

FB	15	(Ulster) Dudley Higgins (NI Civil Service)
RW	14	(Munster) Bertie O'Hanlon (Dolphin)
OC	13	(Ulster) Des McKee (NIFC)
IC	12	(Munster) Paddy Reid (Garryowen)
LW	11	(Leinster) Barney Mullan (Clontarf)
FH	10	(Ulster) Jack Kyle (Queen's University)
SH	9	(Ulster) Ernie Strathdee (Queen's University, c)
N8	8	(Munster) Jim McCarthy (Dolphin)
OF	7	(Ulster) Bob Agar (Malone)
BF	6	(Ulster) Bill McKay (Queen's University)
RL	5	(Munster) Ernie Keeffe (Sundays Well)
LL	4	(Leinster) Colm Callan (Lansdowne)
TP	3	(Ulster) Albert McConnell (Collegians)
HK	2	(Leinster) Karl Mullen (Old Belvedere)
LP	1	(Munster) Jimmy Corcoran (London Irish/UCC)
Coach:

17 January 1948

England	3–3	Wales

Twickenham, London

7 February 1948

Wales	14–0	Scotland

National Stadium, Cardiff

14 February 1948

England	10–11	Ireland
Try: Guest (2); Con: Uren (2)	Report	Try: Callan; Kyle; McKay; Con: Mullan

Twickenham, London

Teams

FB	15	Dick Uren (Waterloo)
RW	14	Dickie Guest (Waterloo)
OC	13	Norman Bennett (Portsmouth)
IC	12	Edward Scott (Redruth, c)
LW	11	Cyril Holmes (Manchester)
FH	10	Ivor Preece (Coventry)
SH	9	Richard Madge (Exeter)
N8	8	Brian Vaughan (Devonport Services)
OF	7	Micky Steele-Bodger (Edinburgh University)
BF	6	Don White (Northampton)
RL	5	Humphrey Luya (Headlingley)
LL	4	Samuel Perry (Cambridge University)
TP	3	George Gibbs (Bristol)
HK	2	Alan Henderson (Cambridge University)
LP	1	Harry Walker (Coventry)
Coach:

FB	15	(Leinster) Jack Mattson (Wanderers)
RW	14	(Munster) Bertie O'Hanlon (Dolphin)
OC	13	(Ulster) Des McKee (NIFC)
IC	12	(Munster) Paddy Reid (Garryowen)
LW	11	(Leinster) Barney Mullan (Clontarf)
FH	10	(Ulster) Jack Kyle (Queen's University)
SH	9	(Munster) Hugh de Lacy (Harlequins)
N8	8	(Munster) Jim McCarthy (Dolphin)
OF	7	(Leinster) Des O'Brien (London Irish)
BF	6	(Ulster) Bill McKay (Queen's University)
RL	5	(Ulster) Jimmy Nelson (Malone)
LL	4	(Leinster) Colm Callan (Lansdowne)
TP	3	(Munster) Chris Daly (London Irish)
HK	2	(Leinster) Karl Mullen (Old Belvedere)
LP	1	(Ulster) Albert McConnell (Collegians)
Coach:

14 February 1948

Wales	3–11	France

National Stadium, Cardiff

21 February 1948

Scotland	9–8	France

Murrayfield, Edinburgh

28 February 1948

Ireland	6–0	Scotland
Try: Mullan; Kyle	Report

Lansdowne Road, Dublin

Teams

FB	15	(Ulster) Dudley Higgins (NI Civil Service)
RW	14	(Munster) Bertie O'Hanlon (Dolphin)
OC	13	(Ulster) Des McKee (NIFC)
IC	12	(Leinster) Mick O'Flanagan (Lansdowne)
LW	11	(Leinster) Barney Mullan (Clontarf)
FH	10	(Ulster) Jack Kyle (Queen's University)
SH	9	(Munster) Hugh de Lacy (Harlequins)
N8	8	(Munster) Jim McCarthy (Dolphin)
OF	7	(Leinster) Des O'Brien (London Irish)
BF	6	(Ulster) Bill McKay (Queen's University)
RL	5	(Ulster) Jimmy Nelson (Malone)
LL	4	(Leinster) Colm Callan (Lansdowne)
TP	3	(Munster) Chris Daly (London Irish)
HK	2	(Leinster) Karl Mullen (Old Belvedere)
LP	1	(Ulster) Albert McConnell (Collegians)
Coach:

FB	15	W.C.W. Murdoch (Hillhead)
RW	14	Graeme Jackson (London Scottish)
OC	13	Charlie Drummond (Melrose)
IC	12	Donny Innes (Aberdeen)
LW	11	David MacKenzie (Edinburgh University)
FH	10	Peter Hepburn (Woodford)
SH	9	Dallas Allardice (Aberdeen)
N8	8	Douglas Elliot (Edinburgh Academicals)
OF	7	Bill Black (Glasgow)
BF	6	Russell Bruce (Gordonians)
RL	5	Leslie Currie (Dunfermline)
LL	4	Howard Campbell (London Scottish)
TP	3	Stewart Coltman (Hawick)
HK	2	Dod Lyall (Gala)
LP	1	Ian Henderson (Edinburgh Academicals)
Coach:

13 March 1948

Ireland	6–3	Wales
Try: Mullan; Daly	Report	Try: B. Williams

Ravenhill, Belfast
Attendance: 32,000

Teams

FB	15	(Ulster) Dudley Higgins (NI Civil Service)
RW	14	(Munster) Bertie O'Hanlon (Dolphin)
OC	13	(Ulster) Des McKee (NIFC)
IC	12	(Munster) Paddy Reid (Garryowen)
LW	11	(Leinster) Barney Mullan (Clontarf)
FH	10	(Ulster) Jack Kyle (Queen's University)
SH	9	(Ulster) Ernie Strathdee (Queen's University)
N8	8	(Munster) Jim McCarthy (Dolphin)
OF	7	(Leinster) Des O'Brien (London Irish)
BF	6	(Ulster) Bill McKay (Queen's University)
RL	5	(Ulster) Jimmy Nelson (Malone)
LL	4	(Leinster) Colm Callan (Lansdowne)
TP	3	(Munster) Chris Daly (London Irish)
HK	2	(Leinster) Karl Mullen (Old Belevdere)
LP	1	(Ulster) Albert McConnell (Collegians)
Coach:

FB	15	Frank Trott (Cardiff)
RW	14	Ken Jones (Newport)
OC	13	Bleddyn Williams (Cardiff)
IC	12	Billy Cleaver (Cardiff)
LW	11	Leslie Williams (Cardiff)
FH	10	Glyn Davies (Pontypridd)
SH	9	Haydn Tanner (Cardiff, c)
N8	8	Gwyn Evans (Cardiff)
OF	7	Leslie Manfield (Cardiff)
BF	6	Ossie Williams (Llanelli)
RL	5	John Gwilliam (Cambridge University)
LL	4	Rees Stephens (Neath)
TP	3	Emlyn Davies (Aberavon)
HK	2	Maldwyn James (Cardiff)
LP	1	Cliff Davies (Cardiff)
Coach:

20 March 1948

Scotland	6–3	England

Murrayfield, Edinburgh

29 March 1948

France	15–0	England

Stade Olympique de Colombes, Paris
