= Cliff Davies (rugby union) =

Welsh rugby union footballer (1919–1967)

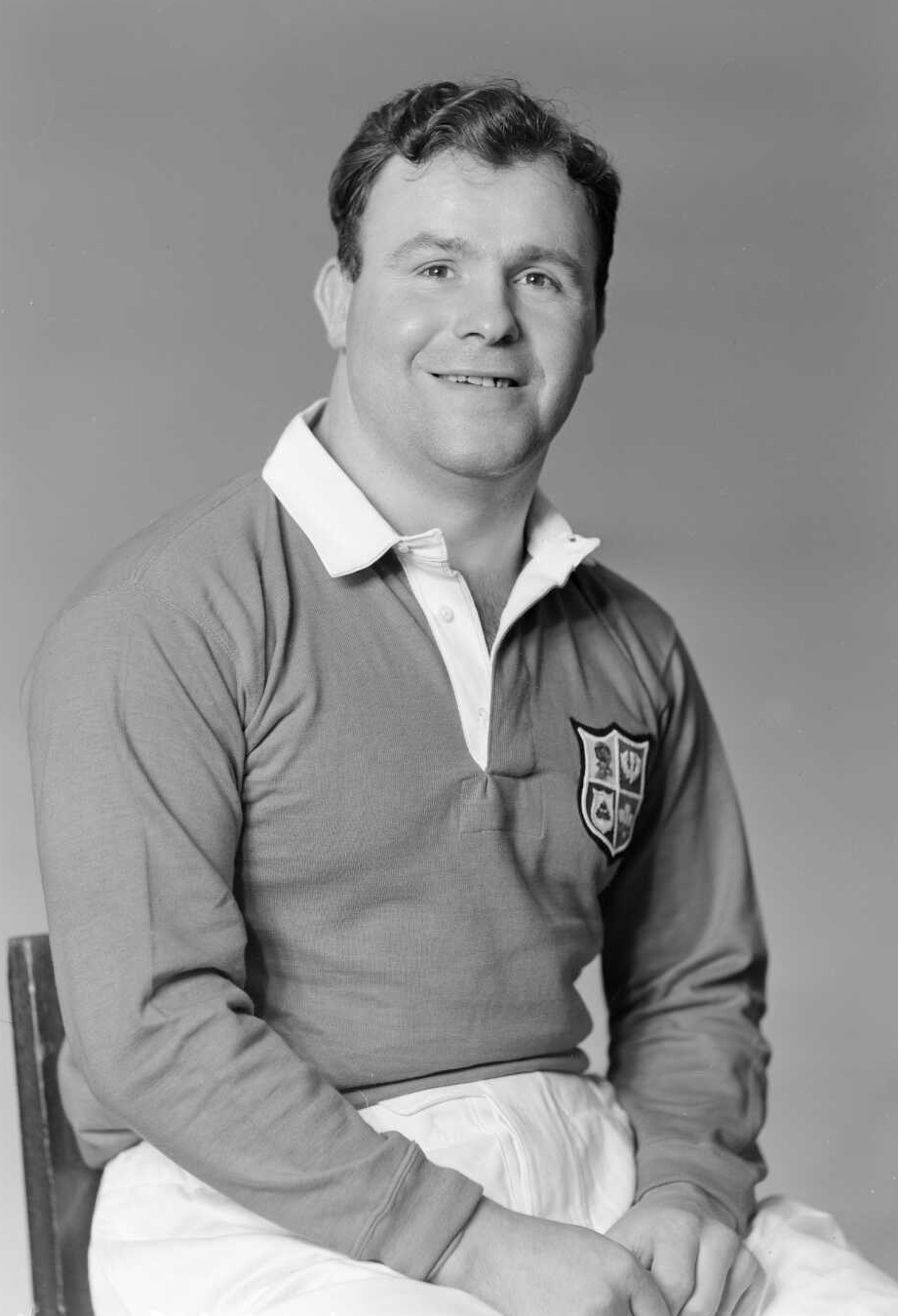
- Davies in New Zealand in 1950
- Born: Clifton Davies; 12 December 1919 Kenfig Hill, Wales
- Died: 28 January 1967 (aged 47) Bridgend, Wales
- Height: 1.75 m (5 ft 9 in)
- Weight: 86 kg (190 lb)
- School: Kenfig Hill Council School
- Occupation: miner

Rugby union career
- Position: Prop
Amateur team(s)
Years	Team	Apps	(Points)
–	Kenfig Hill RFC		
–	Bridgend RFC		
–	Cardiff RFC		
1950–1951	Barbarian F.C.		
International career
Years	Team	Apps	(Points)
1947–1951	Wales	16	(3)
1950	British Lions	1	(0)

Clifton Davies (12 December 1919 – 28 January 1967) was a Welsh international prop who played club rugby for Cardiff and invitational rugby for the Barbarians. He won 16 caps for Wales and was selected to play in the British Lions on the 1950 tour of Australia and New Zealand.

Davies was a short, tough prop forward, who was also known within rugby circles for his cheery demeanor and baritone singing voice.

== Rugby career ==
Davies began his rugby career with local club Kenfig Hill before moving to Bridgend. After the war, Davies was persuaded to join first tier club, Cardiff, by Jack Matthews and joined the Blues in the 1945/46 season. Davies made his international debut for Wales during the 1947 Five Nations Championship, when he was selected to face Scotland at Murrayfield. Under the captaincy of Haydn Tanner, Wales beat the Scottish team convincingly and Davies secured his position in the team for the rest of the season. In his second game for Wales, Davies was involved in a memorable match against France at Stade Colombes. In a bruising encounter, Davies bit the ear of French prop Jean Princlary in the scrum, after the Frenchman's continual harassment of Billy Gore, the Welsh hooker. The Welsh team were happy to win the game by a single drop goal.

During the 1947/48 season, Davies was part of one of the strongest Cardiff teams in the club's history. Out of 41 games, Cardiff lost just two, to Pontypool and Penarth, and also beat the touring Australians. Davies was also picked to face the Australians for Wales, which saw the Welsh team win through two penalty goals from Bill Tamplin. Davies played for all four matches of the 1948 Five Nations Championship, though after a draw against England and a win over Scotland, Davies experienced his first international loss when Wales were beaten by both France and Ireland. The 1949 season was a poor one for Davies, as he was picked for only one game of the tournament in another loss to the French.

1950 was a far better year for Davies, which cemented his position as one of the truly great Welsh props. Davies played in all four of the 1950 Championship which saw Wales win their first Grand Slam since 1911. The Welsh pack included two inexperienced players, David Davies and John Robins, and it was Cliff who steadied the Welsh pack, allowing his hooker to win key possession in the scrums. In the opening game against England, Davies also scored his only international points, finishing off a Lewis Jones run to score a try at Twickenham to give Wales the victory. That year he was chosen for the British Lions tour of Australia and New Zealand, and although playing in only one test, he was a popular character who kept up team morale.

Davies' played in the first three opening games of the 1951 Championship, but was dropped after a draw against Ireland at the Cardiff Arms Park. Davies then faced his final major touring team, when he was part of the Cardiff team that faced the touring South Africa team. It was a close match which Cardiff lost 11–9. Davies played particularly well in the front row, but when he turned up from working down the mine he was unshaven and used his stubble against the South African prop, Jaap Bekker in the scrum. Bekker warned Davies to stop, or he would bite him. Davies did not stop, and Bekker responded by biting a piece out of Davies' ear which caused a heavy bleed.

Davies retired from first class rugby in 1952.

=== International matches played ===
Wales

- Australia 1947
- England 1948, 1950, 1951
- France 1947, 1948, 1949, 1950
- Ireland 1947, 1948, 1950, 1951
- Scotland 1947, 1948, 1950, 1951

British Lions

- New Zealand 1950 (4th Test)

== Bibliography ==
- Godwin, Terry (1984). The International Rugby Championship 1883–1983. London: Willows Books. ISBN 0-00-218060-X.
- Smith, David; Williams, Gareth (1980). Fields of Praise: The Official History of The Welsh Rugby Union. Cardiff: University of Wales Press. ISBN 0-7083-0766-3.
- Thomas, Wayne (1979). A Century of Welsh Rugby Players. Ansells Ltd.
