= Tom Cullen (rugby union) =

Irish rugby union player

- Full name: Thomas Joseph Cullen
- Born: 5 September 1926 Dublin, Ireland

Rugby union career
- Position: Scrum-half
International career
Years	Team	Apps	(Points)
1949	Ireland	1	(0)

Thomas Joseph Cullen was an Irish international rugby union player.

A Dublin-born scrum-half, Cullen played his rugby for University College Dublin and was chosen to partner Jack Kyle for Ireland's opening match of the 1949 Five Nations, against France at Lansdowne Road. He was discarded after Ireland suffered a loss, with Ernest Strathdee recalled in his place.

== See also ==
- List of Ireland national rugby union players
