= 1950 British Lions tour to New Zealand and Australia =

- Date: 10 May – 18 September
- Coach: Leslie B. Osborne
- Tour captain: (Ireland) Karl Mullen
- Test series winners: (v New Zealand) New Zealand (3–0); (v Australia) British and Irish Lions (2–0)
- Top test point scorer: (Wales) Lewis Jones (26)
Summary
P	W	D	L
Total
30	23	1	6
Test match
6	2	1	3
Opponent
P	W	D	L
New Zealand
4	0	1	3
Australia
2	2	0	0

Tour chronology
- ← South Africa 1938 South Africa 1955 →

The British and Irish Lions tour to New Zealand and Australia in 1950 was the first post-war tour made by the Lions rugby union team; there had not been one since 1938.

The 1950 team was the first to be nicknamed "the British Lions", rather than just "British Isles" and sported newly redesigned jerseys and a fresh style of play, managing to win 22 and draw one of 29 matches over the two nations. The Lions won the opening four fixtures before losing to Otago and Southland, but succeeded in holding the All Blacks to a nine-all draw. The Lions performed well in the remaining All Black tests though they lost all three, the team did not lose another non-test in the New Zealand leg of the tour. The Lions won all their games in Australia except for their final fixture against a New South Wales XV in Newcastle. They won both of the two tests against Australia, in Brisbane and in Sydney.

Because the team was travelling by ship, rather than by air as modern tours do, they also stopped off in Colombo, Ceylon (now Sri Lanka) to play an unofficial game against the national team.

== Squad ==
Manager: L.B. Osborne (England)

Player	Position	National team	Club/province	Lions Tests this tour
Grahame Budge	Prop	Scotland	(Scotland) Edinburgh Wanderers	2
Tom Clifford	Prop	Ireland	(Ireland) Young Munster	5
Cliff Davies	Prop	Wales	(Wales) Cardiff	1
John Robins	Prop	Wales	(England) Birkenhead Park	5
Dai Davies	Prop	Wales	(England) Somerset Police	3
Karl Mullen (c)	Hooker	Ireland	(Ireland) Old Belvedere	4
Roy John	Lock	Wales	(Wales) Neath	6
Don Hayward	Lock	Wales	(Wales) Newbridge	3
Jimmy Nelson	Lock	Ireland	(Ireland) Malone	4
Bob Evans	Flanker	Wales	(Wales) Newport	6
Jim McCarthy	Flanker	Ireland	(Ireland) Dolphin	0
Bill McKay	Flanker	Ireland	(Ireland) Queen's University RFC	6
Vic Roberts	Flanker	England	(England) Penryn	0
Peter Kininmonth	No. 8	Scotland	(England) Richmond	3
Rees Stephens	No. 8	Wales	(Wales) Neath	2
Angus Black	Scrum-half	Scotland	(Scotland) Edinburgh University	2
Gordon Rimmer	Scrum-half	England	(England) Waterloo	1
Rex Willis	Scrum-half	Wales	(Wales) Cardiff	3
Jack Kyle	Fly-half	Ireland	(Ireland) Queen's University	6
Noel Henderson	Centre	Ireland	(Ireland) Queen's University	1
Jack Matthews	Centre	Wales	(Wales) Cardiff	6
Ivor Preece	Centre	England	(England) Coventry	1
Bleddyn Williams	Centre	Wales	(Wales) Cardiff	5
Ken Jones	Wing	Wales	(Wales) Newport	3
Mick Lane	Wing	Ireland	(Ireland) University College Cork	2
Ranald Macdonald	Wing	Scotland	(Scotland) Edinburgh University	2
George Norton	Wing	Ireland	(Ireland) Bective Rangers	0
Doug Smith	Wing	Scotland	(England) London Scottish	1
Malcolm Thomas	Wing	Wales	(Wales) Newport	3
Billy Cleaver	Full-back	Wales	(Wales) Cardiff	3
Lewis Jones	Full-back	Wales	(Wales) Llanelli	3

== Results ==
Scores and results list British Isles' points tally first.

Opposing Team	For	Against	Date	Venue	Status
Nelson-Marlborough-Golden Bay-Motueka	24	3	10 May 1950	Nelson	Tour Match
Buller	24	9	13 May 1950	Westport	Tour Match
West Coast	32	3	16 May 1950	Greymouth	Tour Match
Otago	9	23	19 May 1950	Dunedin	Tour Match
Southland	0	11	23 May 1950	Invercargill	Tour Match
New Zealand	9	9	27 May 1950	Carisbrook, Dunedin	Test Match
South Canterbury	27	8	30 May 1950	Timaru	Tour Match
Canterbury	16	5	3 June 1950	Christchurch	Tour Match
Ashburton County-North Otago	29	6	6 June 1950	Ashburton	Tour Match
New Zealand	0	8	10 June 1950	Christchurch	Test Match
Waiparapa Bush	27	13	14 June 1950	Masterton	Tour Match
Hawke's Bay	20	0	17 June 1950	Napier	Tour Match
East Coast–Poverty Bay–Bay of Plenty	27	3	21 June 1950	Gisborne	Tour Match
Wellington	12	6	24 June 1950	Athletic Park, Wellington,	Tour Match
New Zealand	3	6	1 July 1950	Athletic Park, Wellington	Test Match
Wanganui	31	3	5 July 1950	Wanganui	Tour Match
Taranaki	25	3	8 July 1950	New Plymouth	Tour Match
Manawatu–Horowhenua	13	8	12 July 1950	Palmerston North	Tour Match
Waikato- Thames Valley-King Country	30	0	15 July 1950	Hamilton	Tour Match
North Auckland	8	6	19 July 1950	Whangarei	Tour Match
Auckland	32	9	22 July 1950	Auckland	Tour Match
New Zealand	8	11	29 July 1950	Eden Park, Auckland	Test Match
New Zealand Māori	14	9	2 August 1950	Athletic Park, Wellington	Tour Match
Combined Country	47	3	9 August 1950		Tour Match
New South Wales	22	6	12 August 1950	Cricket Ground, Sydney	Tour Match
Australia	19	6	19 August 1950	The Gabba, Brisbane	Test Match
Australia	24	3	26 August 1950	Cricket Ground, Sydney	Test Match
Metropolitan Union	26	17	29 August 1950	Cricket Ground, Sydney	Tour Match
New South Wales	12	17	2 September 1950	Newcastle	Tour Match
Ceylon	44	6	18 September 1950	Colombo	Tour Match

10 May 1950
14:45

Combined XV (Nelson, Marlborough, Golden Bay & Motueka)	3–24	British Lions
Try: Kingi		Try: I.Preece; M.C.Thomas; Pen: M.C.Thomas (6/6)

Nelson
Attendance: 7,000
Referee: Mr E Tindill

13 May 1950
15:00

Buller	9–24	British Lions
Pen: F.Neighbours 3		Try: M.C.Thomas; K.J.Jones; R.MacDonald; J.W.McKay; J.Matthews; Con: G.W.Norton 3 Pen: G.W.Norton

Westport
Attendance: 4,000
Referee: Mr E D Hill
