= Tom Clifford (rugby union) =

Irish rugby union player

- Born: Jeremiah Thomas Clifford; 15 November 1923 Phippsboro, County Tipperary, Ireland
- Died: 1 October 1990 (aged 66)

Rugby union career
- Position: Prop
Amateur team(s)
Years	Team	Apps	(Points)
- Young Munster
International career
Years	Team	Apps	(Points)
1949–1952	Ireland	14	(3)
1950	British and Irish Lions	5	(0)

Tom Clifford (15 November 1923 – 1 October 1990) was an Irish rugby union player who played in the prop position. Clifford played club rugby with Young Munster, represented the Munster provincial team, was capped 14 times for Ireland, and was a member of the Lions team that toured in 1950.

== Early life ==
Tom Clifford was born in Phippsoboro, County Tipperary. When Clifford was three years old, his family moved to Limerick. He attended CBS Sexton Street secondary school, where he participated in the school hurling team.

== Club and provincial rugby career ==
Clifford made his senior début for Young Munster in a friendly match against Cork Constitution aged 15 at fullback. He made his Munster Senior Cup début in 1943 as a wing-forward.

During his time at the club, Young Munster won the Munster Senior League on two occasions, 1944 and 1952 and twice reached the final of the Munster Senior Cup in 1947 and 1948, but lost both times.

Clifford retired from playing rugby in 1957. Young Munster's home ground, Tom Clifford Park, is named after him.

== International career ==
Clifford made his début for Ireland against France at Lansdowne Road on 29 January 1949 in Ireland's first game of the 1949 Five Nations Championship. He played in all four of Ireland's matches in the 1949 tournament which ended with Ireland being crowned the champions and winning the Triple Crown. He also played in all of Ireland's games during the 1950 Five Nations Championship.

Clifford was named in the squad for the 1950 British Lions tour to New Zealand and Australia, the first post-war tour by a British Isles combined team and the first where the team was officially called British Lions. The touring party travelled by boat, departing in April and not returning until October. Clifford featured in 20 of the 29 tour matches, including in five test matches; three against New Zealand and two against Australia, and scoring a try against Taranaki. On his return to Limerick, a crowd of around 8,000 people turned out at Limerick railway station to greet him.

The 1951 Five Nations Championship was again won by Ireland, with Clifford playing in the games against France and England. Clifford's only appearance at home outside of the Five Nations Championship came in December 1951, as South Africa played Ireland as part of their European tour. His final international appearances came during the 1952 Five Nations Championship, with his last game being against Wales on 8 March.

== Personal life ==
Clifford married his wife, Virginia in August 1957.
