= Bob Agar =

Ireland international rugby union player

- Full name: Robert Dunlop Agar
- Born: 29 March 1920 Fenagh, County Carlow, Ireland
- Died: 23 April 1998 (aged 78) Belfast, Northern Ireland
- Occupation: Police officer

Rugby union career
- Position(s): lock, number eight
Amateur team(s)
Years	Team	Apps	(Points)
1939-1943	Civil Service		
1943-1955	Malone		
Provincial / State sides
Years	Team	Apps	(Points)
1943-1950	Ulster		
International career
Years	Team	Apps	(Points)
1947-1950	Ireland	10	(0)

Robert Dunlop Agar (29 March 1920 - 23 April 1998) was an Irish international rugby union player who was part of the team that won Ireland's first Grand Slam in the 1948 Five Nations Championship.

Born in Fenagh, County Carlow, he played Gaelic Football for the Fighting Cocks in Rathtoe, and was introduced to rugby at Kilkenny College. He moved to Mountjoy School in Dublin, and represented Leinster at schoolboy level. In 1939 he moved to Belfast, and joined Civil Service Rugby Club, before moving to Malone RFC in 1943, where he partnered Jimmy Nelson in the second row.

He played for Ulster from 1943 to 1950, and captained the province. In 1945 he was selected for an Irish services team which defeated the British Combined Services at Ravenhill. His first full international for Ireland was against France at Lansdowne Road in 1947. He won ten caps for Ireland, five at number eight and five in the second row, playing in the 1948 team that won the Grand Slam, and the 1949 team that won the Triple Crown. He also represented the Barbarians. He played one game for County Carlow in 1948. He retired from representative rugby in 1950, and from club rugby in 1945.

Off the field, he was a police officer for the Royal Ulster Constabulary, and was awarded the MBE as a Chief Inspector in the 1977 Silver Jubilee and Birthday Honours. He retired in 1980 after 40 years' service. In 1994 he was give the Hall of Fame award in the County Carlow Sports Star Awards. He died in Belfast.
