= Leslie Griffin =

Irish rugby union player

- Full name: Leslie John Griffin
- Born: 14 September 1922 Arklow, County Wicklow, Ireland
- Died: 13 March 2003 (aged 81)

Rugby union career
- Position: Prop
International career
Years	Team	Apps	(Points)
1949	Ireland	2	(0)

Leslie John Griffin (14 September 1922 — 13 March 2003) was an Irish international rugby union player.

Born in Arklow, County Wicklow, Griffin played for Dublin club Wanderers and was capped twice for Ireland during their triple crown-winning 1949 Five Nations campaign, replacing Albert McConnell in the front row for the final two fixtures, against Scotland at Murrayfield and Wales at Swansea. He was a reserve the following season, but didn't add to his caps.

== See also ==
- List of Ireland national rugby union players
