= Mick Lane (rugby union) =

Irish rugby union player (1926–2025)

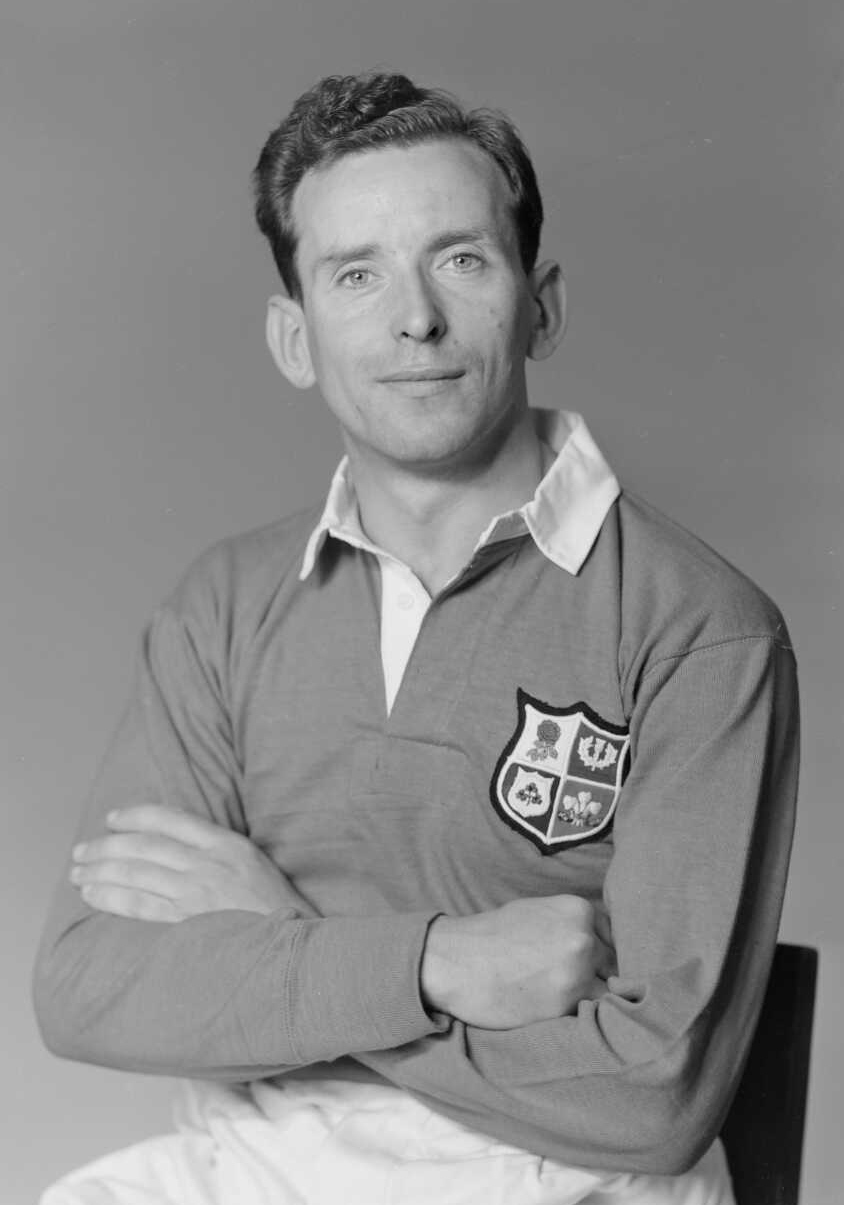
- Lane in New Zealand in 1950
- Born: Michael Francis Lane; 3 October 1926 Cork, County Cork, Ireland
- Died: 9 November 2025 (aged 99) Cork, Ireland

Rugby union career
- Position: Wing
Amateur team(s)
| Years | Team | Apps | (Points) |
- University College Cork RFC
International career
| Years | Team | Apps | (Points) |
| 1947–1953 | Ireland | 17 | (3) |
| 1950 | British and Irish Lions | 2 | (0) |

Michael Francis Lane (3 October 1926 – 9 November 2025) was an Irish rugby union player who played in the wing position. Lane played club rugby with University College Cork, represented the Munster provincial team, was capped 17 times for Ireland, and was a member of the Lions team that toured in 1950.

== Early life ==
Lane was born in Cork, Irish Free State on 3 October 1926.

== Rugby career ==
Lane made his international début for Ireland in March 1947 against Wales in the Five Nations Championship. Injury kept him out of the 1948 Five Nations Championship, but he played in all four of Ireland's matches during the 1949 Championship that saw them clinch the title and the Triple Crown. Lane made his only appearance for the Barbarians invitational team in April 1949 against Cardiff during their Easter tour.

Following three more appearances for Ireland in the 1950 Five Nations Championship, Lane was included in the Lions squad that was selected to tour New Zealand and Australia in 1950. Lane played in a total of 11 matches during the tour, including a test match against both New Zealand and Australia with the other nine appearances in tour matches against local opposition. Following the death of Lewis Jones in March 2024, Lane became the last surviving member of the 1950 Lions touring team.

Lane made three appearances in the 1951 Five Nations that again saw Ireland win the Championship, and played twice against South Africa in December that year as part of their tour of Europe. The first was in the test match for Ireland, and the second was in a tour game representing his province of Munster.

In the second of his two appearances in the 1952 Five Nations, Lane scored his only points for Ireland with a try against Scotland. His final appearances for Ireland came during the 1953 Five Nations.

== Later life and death ==
Lane was inducted into the Rugby Writers of Ireland Hall of Fame in 2011. Lane's nephew, Michael Kiernan, was also an Ireland and Lions international. He died at his home in Cork City, on 9 November 2025, at the age of 99.
