= Albert McConnell =

Rugby union player from Northern Ireland

- Full name: Albert Arthur McGown McConnell
- Born: 29 October 1919 Belfast, Ireland

Rugby union career
- Position: Prop
International career
Years	Team	Apps	(Points)
1947–49	Ireland	7	(0)

Albert Arthur McGown McConnell, known as Bertie McConnell, was an Irish international rugby union player.

A Collegians prop, McConnell made his Ireland debut against the touring Wallabies at Lansdowne Road in 1947. He was capped seven times in total, which included all matches of their historic 1948 Five Nations Championship grand slam, forming a front row with John Daly and Karl Mullen.

McConnell was a physician by profession.

In 1968, McConnell and his family were contestants on the BBC1 game show Ask the Family.

== See also ==
- List of Ireland national rugby union players
