= Colm Callan =

Irish rugby union player

Colm Patrick Callan (also known as Colum) (6 January 1923 – 30 May 2010) was an Irish rugby player who played as a second-row forward for Lansdowne Football Club and was part of the Irish rugby team from 1947 to 1949, winning 10 caps.

Callan was born in Port, Co Louth Ireland and educated at Castleknock College.

Callan played with the Irish team that won their first Grand Slam in the 1948 Five Nations Championship, in all 4 matches. He also was a member of the 1949 Five Nations Championship winning team. He won his first cap on 25 January 1947, in a Championship match against France in Dublin, an 8-12 defeat. His final game was on 12 February 1949, against England, in a 14–5 victory, also in Dublin.

He continued to work in the insurance business following his rugby career and was married for over 60 years to Margaret Callan (née Shackleton) of Doncaster, Yorkshire. He died on 30 May 2010.
