= 1951 Five Nations Championship =

Rugby union competition

- Date: 13 January - 7 April 1951
- Countries: England; Ireland; France; Scotland; Wales

Tournament statistics
- Champions: Ireland (7th title)
- Matches played: 10

The 1951 Five Nations Championship was the twenty-second series of the rugby union Five Nations Championship. Including the previous incarnations as the Home Nations and Five Nations, this was the fifty-seventh series of the northern hemisphere rugby union championship. Ten matches were played between 13 January and 7 April. It was contested by England, France, Ireland, Scotland and Wales. Ireland missed out on a second Grand Slam after drawing against Wales at Cardiff Arms Park, but won the championship.

== Participants ==
The teams involved were:

Nation	Venue	City	Captain
England	Twickenham	London	Vic Roberts/John Kendall-Carpenter
France	Stade Olympique Yves-du-Manoir	Colombes	Guy Basquet
Ireland	Lansdowne Road	Dublin	Karl Mullen
Scotland	Murrayfield	Edinburgh	Peter Kininmonth
Wales	National Stadium/St. Helens	Cardiff/Swansea	John Gwilliam/Jack Matthews

== Table ==
Pos	Team	Pld	W	D	L	PF	PA	PD	Pts
1	Ireland	4	3	1	0	21	16	+5	7
2	France	4	3	0	1	41	27	+14	6
3	Wales	4	1	1	2	29	35	−6	3
4	Scotland	4	1	0	3	39	25	+14	2
4	England	4	1	0	3	13	40	−27	2

== Results ==
1951-01-13

France	14–12	Scotland

Paris

1951-01-20

Wales	23–5	England

Swansea

1951-01-27

Ireland	9–8	France

Dublin

1951-02-03

Scotland	19–0	Wales

Edinburgh

1951-02-10

Ireland	3–0	England

Dublin

1951-02-24

England	3–11	France

London

1951-02-24

Scotland	5–6	Ireland

Edinburgh

1951-03-10

Wales	3–3	Ireland

Cardiff

1951-03-17

England	5–3	Scotland

London

1951-04-07

France	8–3	Wales

Paris
