= Peter Hepburn =

- Full name: Derek Peter Hepburn
- Born: 15 March 1920 London, England
- Died: 30 April 1996 (aged 76) Milton on Stour, England
- School: Eastbourne College

Rugby union career
- Position: Centre / Stand-off
International career
Years	Team	Apps	(Points)
1947–49	Scotland	9	(4)

Derek Peter Hepburn (15 March 1920 — 30 April 1996) was a Scottish international rugby union player.

Born in London, Hepburn was educated at Eastbourne College and served as an Army major in World War II.

Hepburn began playing rugby for Essex club Woodford as a teenager before the war, where he remained through his career, despite offers from more high-profile teams. He made his Scotland debut as a stand-off in their loss to the Wallabies in 1947 and contributed a drop goal. His next four caps, in the 1948 Five Nations, were also as a stand-off, forming a partnership with Dallas Allardice. He was switched to centre for his four 1949 Five Nations matches.

== See also ==
- List of Scotland national rugby union players
