= Barney Mullan =

Rugby union player from Northern Ireland

- Full name: Bernard Mullan
- Born: County Down, Ireland
- Died: 25 September 1986 Naas, County Kildare, Ireland

Rugby union career
- Position: Wing
International career
Years	Team	Apps	(Points)
1947–48	Ireland	8	(36)

Bernard Mullan (died 25 September 1986) was an Irish rugby union international.

Born in County Down, Mullen was a winger and played his rugby for Dublin club Clontarf.

Mullen gained eight caps for Ireland, debuting against France at Lansdowne Road in the 1947 Five Nations. An important component of Ireland's successful 1948 Five Nations campaign, Mullen was the team's place kicker and scored tries in three of the four matches, including the first of Ireland's two in the 6–3 win over Wales that secured the grand slam.

A farmer by profession, Mullen turned down a place on the 1950 British Lions tour due to work commitments.

== See also ==
- List of Ireland national rugby union players
