= Alan Henderson (disambiguation) =

Alan Henderson (born 1972) is an American former basketball player.

Alan Henderson may also refer to:

- Alan Henderson (bobsledder) (born 1965), English-born New Zealand bobsledder
- Alan Henderson (rugby union) (1920–2003), English rugby union player
- Alan Henderson (Home and Away), fictional character
