= Hugh de Lacy (rugby union) =

Irish rugby union player

- Born: 20 November 1919
- Died: 8 November 1979 (aged 59)
- School: Mountjoy School
- University: Trinity College Dublin

Rugby union career
- Position: Scrum-half
International career
Years	Team	Apps	(Points)
1948	Ireland	2	(0)

Hugh de Lacy (20 November 1919 — 8 November 1979) was an Irish international rugby union player.

Hailing from Limerick, de Lacy was one of eight children and attended Mountjoy School in Dublin.

De Lacy received a scholarship to Trinity College Dublin and was varsity rugby player for Dublin University, which he captained in the 1941–42 season. From 1944, de Lacy was based in London and played for Harlequins, from where he gained an Ireland call up for the 1948 Five Nations. He was preferred to Ernest Strathdee as scrum-half for the second and third fixtures, partnering out-half Jack Kyle in wins over England at Twickenham and Scotland at Lansdowne Road. Selectors returned to Strathdee for the tournament decider, as Ireland claimed a first ever grand slam.

In addition to rugby, de Lacy played inter-provincial hockey for Leinster and Munster.

== See also ==
- List of Ireland national rugby union players
