= Dudley Higgins =

Irish international rugby union player

- Full name: James Arthur Dudley Higgins
- Born: 20 May 1920 Rathdrum, County Wicklow, Ireland
- Died: 30 December 1999 (aged 79) Belfast, Northern Ireland
- School: Mountjoy School

Rugby union career
- Position: Fullback
Amateur team(s)
Years	Team	Apps	(Points)
- Civil Service
Senior career
Years	Team	Apps	(Points)
- Ulster
International career
Years	Team	Apps	(Points)
1947-1948	Ireland	6	(0)

James Arthur Dudley Higgins, known as Dudley Higgins, (20 May 1920 – 30 December 1999) was an Irish international rugby union player and administrator. He played club rugby for Civil Service Rugby Club and the Ireland national rugby union team as a fullback. He served as president of Ulster Rugby and multiple terms as president of the Irish Rugby Football Union.

== Life ==
Higgins was born in Rathdrum, County Wicklow. He attended Mountjoy School in Dublin. He moved to Northern Ireland during the Second World War to work for the Northern Ireland Civil Service, eventually becoming the Assistant Secretary in the Department of Health. During this time, he played club rugby for Civil Service. During the 40s, he also played provincial rugby for Ulster. During this time, he was called up to play for the Ireland national rugby union team, making his debut against Scotland in 1947. He was a part of Ireland's successful 1948 Five Nations Championship where Ireland won their first Grand Slam, missing only the game against England and earning the last of his six international caps in the process.

After retiring from playing, Higgins became the president of the Ulster branch of the IRFU in 1960. He would later serve as the vice-president of the IRFU in 1975 but would take over as president following the death of Jim Keane after 12 days. Higgins would serve the rest of Keane's term and was elected for his own term as president in 1976. Following these roles, he would act as treasurer for Ulster and as a selector for Ireland for four years. In 1996, both Higgins and fellow 1948 Grand Slam winner Bertie O'Hanlon were inducted into the Rugby Writers of Ireland Hall of Fame.

Higgins died on 30 December 1999, being survived by his two children.
