= Paddy Reid =

Ireland international rugby union & league footballer

- Born: Patrick Joseph Reid; 17 March 1923 Limerick, Ireland
- Died: 8 January 2016 (aged 92) Limerick, Ireland

Rugby union career
- Position: Centre
Senior career
Years	Team	Apps	(Points)
- Garryowen FC
–	Munster		
International career
Years	Team	Apps	(Points)
1947–1948	Ireland	4	(3)
- Rugby league career

Playing information
- Position: Centre
Club
Years	Team	Pld	T	G	FG	P
1948	Huddersfield
	Halifax
	Total	0	0	0	0	0

Patrick Joseph Reid (17 March 1923 – 8 January 2016) was an Irish dual-code rugby centre. Reid played rugby union for Garryowen and Ireland, and was part of the 1948 Grand Slam-winning team. The following season, he switched codes, joining professional rugby league club Huddersfield, before ending his league career with Halifax.

== Personal life ==
Patrick Joseph Reid was born in Limerick on St Patrick's Day 1924 into a family that ran a local pig business, and was educated at Crescent College. His cousin Tom Reid also played rugby for Garryowen and Ireland, as well as being a Lions tourist to South Africa in 1955. Paddy was also a keen hockey and soccer player, making appearances for Limerick FC. He died on 8 January 2016 in Limerick.

== Rugby union ==
Reid came to note as a rugby player when he represented Garryowen in the 1940s; playing his first game against University College, Galway. Reid captained Garryowen to a senior league and cup double in 1947, and featured for Munster in the interprovincial series.

In December 1947 he won his first international cap, when he was selected to face Australia on their 1947–48 tour. The Irish team started the match with eight new caps, and Reid was partnered with Kevin Joseph Quinn at centre, the only player with any past international experience in the three-quarter positions. Australia were far too strong for Ireland, beating them 16–3.

Despite the loss, the Irish selectors kept faith with Reid and he returned into the Ireland team for the opening game of the 1948 Five Nations Championship. The campaign started well with a victory over France in Paris, and Reid scored his first and only international points, running the ball under the posts after a tactical line-out. The following game saw Karl Mullen appointed Ireland team captain, and the tactical changes he brought to the team turned the squad into a far superior unit. Although Ireland did not possess the talent of other teams, as a unit they began to play a more defensive and tight game, taking their chances wisely. The new tactical play gave Ireland victory over England in a close game at Twickenham. The last two games of the Championship were both played at home, the first a victory over Scotland at Lansdowne Road, for which Reid was omitted. The Scottish victory gave Ireland the Championship title, but the team had not won a Triple Crown title since 1899. Reid was reinstated for the Wales encounter at Ravenhill in Belfast. The Irish pressured Wales in the first half, and a late try by prop John "Jack" Daly gave Ireland a famous Triple Crown and Grand Slam win; a feat the national team would not repeat until 2009.

The Irish team were carried from the ground by their supporters, and after a celebration dinner the team members went their own way. Reid, Daly and Des O'Brien went to a dance after the game, and spent the night in police custody after some "high jinks" with an Orange flute band.

At the end of the 1947–48 season, Reid made an economic decision to switch codes to professional rugby league in England. Although Reid returned to Ireland just three years after leaving, any switch to rugby league ended in lifetime bans from the rugby union game. Despite this, Reid continued to coach in Ireland behind the scenes.

== Rugby league ==
He originally joined Huddersfield in the RFL Championship, along with Triple Crown-winning teammate John "Jack" Daly. Reid scored two tries and a goal against Australia on the first match of their 1948–49 tour, but after a few months, moved to Halifax. In 1949, he was part of the Halifax team that reached the Challenge Cup final, losing in front of 98,000 spectators at Wembley to Bradford Northern. On 25 March 2004, Reid was among six footballers inducted into Rugby League Ireland's inaugural Hall of Fame at the Rugby League Heritage Centre in Huddersfield, alongside John "Jack" Daly, Robert "Bob" Kelly, Seamus McCallion, Tom McKinney and Terry O'Connor.
