= Ossie Williams =

Wales international rugby union player

- Full name: Oswald Williams
- Born: 12 April 1921 Llanelly, Wales
- Died: 23 March 1988 (aged 66) Risca, Wales

Rugby union career
- Position: Wing forward
International career
Years	Team	Apps	(Points)
1947–48	Wales	7	(3)

Oswald Williams (12 April 1921 – 23 March 1988) was a Welsh international rugby union player.

A wing forward, Williams got his start at Llanelly RFC after World War II and was capped seven times for Wales, which included their win over the Wallabies at Cardiff in 1947. He scored the only points of his career through a penalty goal against France in the 1948 Five Nations. Continuing with Llanelly for several more years, Williams ascended to the club captaincy in the 1951–52 season. He also competed with Felinfoel, Furnace and Pontyberem during his career.

Williams worked outside of rugby as a furnace hand at the Llanelly Steelworks.

== See also ==
- List of Wales national rugby union players
