= Des McKee =

Rugby union player from Northern Ireland

- Full name: William Desmond McKee
- Born: 27 August 1923 Belfast, Northern Ireland
- Died: 28 January 1982 (aged 58) Belfast, Northern Ireland
- School: Mourne Grange School; St Columba's College
- Occupation: Builder

Rugby union career
- Position: Centre
International career
Years	Team	Apps	(Points)
1947–51	Ireland	12	(6)

William Desmond McKee CBE (27 August 1923 — 28 January 1982) was an Irish international rugby union player.

A native of Belfast, McKee was educated at Mourne Grange School in Kilkeel and St Columba's College outside Dublin.

McKee, a speedy three-quarter, was Irish 440 yards champion in 1946 and played his rugby for Belfast-based club North of Ireland. He made his Ireland debut on the wing against Australia at Lansdowne Road in 1947, but won most of his 12 international caps as a centre, including all four matches of the grand slam-winning 1948 Five Nations campaign. His second-half try against England at Twickenham proved decisive in a 11–10 win.

Post rugby, McKee became chairman of F. B. McKee and Co., Belfast, succeeding his father. He was president of the Federation of Building and Civil Engineering Contractors, Northern Ireland from 1976 to 1978.

McKee was made a Commander of the Order of the British Empire in the 1979 New Year Honours.

== See also ==
- List of Ireland national rugby union players
