= George Cromey =

Rugby union player from Northern Ireland

- Full name: George Ernest Cromey
- Born: 8 May 1913 Bushmills, Co. Antrim
- Died: 27 September 2006 (aged 93) Ballymoney, Co. Antrim
- School: Methodist College Belfast
- University: Queen's University Belfast
- Occupation: Presbyterian minister

Rugby union career
- Position: Fly-half
International career
Years	Team	Apps	(Points)
1937–39	Ireland	9	(6)
1938	British Lions	1	(0)

George Ernest Cromey (8 May 1913 — 27 September 2006) was a rugby union international from Northern Ireland.

Born in Bushmills, County Antrim, Cromey was one of nine siblings. He attended Methodist College Belfast and was a 1935 graduate of Queen's University Belfast, with an honours degree in classics.

Cromey, a diminutive Queen's University fly-half, was capped nine times by Ireland in the late 1930s. He was also a member of the 1938 British Lions tour of South Africa, where he came into the team for the final Test in Cape Town, which was won 21–16. During the tour, Cromey was asked to be a roommate of Paddy Mayne, in an attempt to control the temperamental lock (later a founding member of the Special Air Service).

A RAF chaplain in World War II, Cromey served as a minister at Ballyweaney Presbyterian Church for 39 years.

== See also ==
- List of Ireland national rugby union players
