= Dod Lyall =

- Full name: George Gibson Lyall
- Born: 23 May 1921 Galashiels, Scotland
- Died: 10 May 1996 (aged 74)

Rugby union career
- Position: Hooker
International career
Years	Team	Apps	(Points)
1947–48	Scotland	5	(0)

George Gibson Lyall (23 May 1921 — 10 May 1996) was a Scottish international rugby union player.

Born in Galashiels, Lyall was a Gala hooker whose career was impacted by World War II, during which he served as a pilot officer in the Royal Air Force. He was captured by Germany in 1944 and sent to a prisoner of war camp.

Lyall represented Scotland in their unofficial internationals played in the immediate post war period, prior to gaining his maiden cap against the touring Wallabies at Murrayfield in 1947. He was Scotland's hooker for all four matches of their 1948 Five Nations campaign. A sciatica issue he picked up as a prisoner in Germany forced him to retire aged 30.

== See also ==
- List of Scotland national rugby union players
