= Willie Duncan (rugby union) =

Rugby union player from Northern Ireland

- Full name: William Robert Duncan
- Born: 14 July 1957 (age 69) Belfast, Northern Ireland

Rugby union career
- Position: Flanker
International career
Years	Team	Apps	(Points)
1984	Ireland	2	(0)

William Robert Duncan (born 14 July 1957) is a former Irish international rugby union player from Northern Ireland.

Born in Belfast, Duncan was a Malone flanker, capped twice by Ireland in the 1984 Five Nations. He made his debut against Wales at Lansdowne Road, then lost his place for the next fixture, before winning a recall at Twickenham when Fergus Slattery had to withdraw with illness.

Duncan played on the Ulster team that defeated the 1984 Wallabies at Ravenhill.

== See also ==
- List of Ireland national rugby union players
