= Tom McKinney =

GB international rugby league footballer

Personal information
- Full name: Thomas McKinney
- Born: 31 December 1926 Ballymena, Northern Ireland
- Died: 10 November 1999 (aged 72) Salford

Playing information

Rugby union
Club
| Years | Team | Pld | T | G | FG | P |
|---|---|---|---|---|---|---|
| ≤1949–1949 | Jed-Forest RFC |

Rugby league
- Position: Prop, Hooker
Club
| Years | Team | Pld | T | G | FG | P |
|---|---|---|---|---|---|---|
| 1949–54 | Salford | 148 | 4 | 0 | 0 | 12 |
| 1955–57 | Warrington | 64 | 3 | 0 | 0 | 9 |
| 1957–59 | St. Helens | 93 | 11 | 5 | 0 | 43 |
Representative
| Years | Team | Pld | T | G | FG | P |
| 1954 | Combined Nationalities | 1 | 1 | 0 | 0 | 3 |
| 1951–55 | Other Nationalities | 8 | 0 | 0 | 0 | 0 |
| 1952 | British Empire XIII | 1 | 0 | 0 | 0 | 0 |
| 1954 | Rugby League XIII | 1 | 0 | 0 | 0 | 0 |
| 1951–57 | Great Britain | 15 | 0 | 0 | 0 | 0 |

Thomas McKinney (31 December 1926 – 10 November 1999) was a Northern Irish rugby union and professional rugby league footballer who played in the 1940s and 1950s. He played club level rugby union (RU) for Jed-Forest RFC, and representative level rugby league (RL) for Great Britain, Other Nationalities, British Empire XIII, Rugby League XIII and Combined Nationalities, and at club level for Salford (two spells), Warrington and St Helens, as a prop or hooker.

== Background ==
Tom McKinney was born in Ballymena, Northern Ireland.

== Playing career ==
=== International honours ===
Tom McKinney represented Combined Nationalities, and scored a try in the 15–19 defeat by France at Stade de Gerland, Lyon on Sunday 3 January 1954, won 7(8?)-caps for Other Nationalities (RL), represented British Empire XIII (RL) while at Salford in 1952 against New Zealand, represented Rugby League XIII while at Salford in 1954 against France, and won caps for Great Britain while at Salford in 1951 against New Zealand, in 1952 against France (non-test), Australia (2 matches), in 1953 against France (non-test), in 1954 against France (non-test), Australia (3 matches), New Zealand, while at Warrington in 1955 against New Zealand (2 matches), France (non-test), New Zealand, in 1956 against France (non-test), while at St. Helens in the 1957 Rugby League World Cup against New Zealand.

In the 1954 Australasian Tour he was brought out of the scrum by Darcy Lawler, Australia's most controversial referee at the time, and accused of biting. A flabbergasted McKinney just opened his mouth to reveal his toothless gums.

=== Championship Final appearances ===
Tom McKinney played in Warrington's 7–3 victory over Oldham the Championship Final during the 1954–55 season at Maine Road, Manchester on Saturday 14 May 1955.

=== County Cup Final appearances ===
Tom McKinney played hooker in St. Helens 2–12 defeat by Oldham in the 1958–59 Lancashire Cup Final during the 1958–59 season at Central Park, Wigan on Saturday 25 October 1958, and played hooker in the 4–5 defeat by Warrington in the 1959–60 Lancashire Cup Final during the 1959–60 season at Central Park, Wigan on Saturday 31 October 1959.

=== Club career ===
Raised in Scotland, Tom McKinney played rugby union for Jed-Forest RFC, in November 1949 he changed to the rugby league code and transferred to Salford, in January 1955 he transferred to Warrington, on Tuesday 22 January 1957 he transferred to St. Helens for £2000 (based on increases in average earnings, this would be approximately £101,200 in 2013), winning a Championship medal during the 1958–59 season, after Friday 25 December 1959 he transferred to Salford.

== Honoured by Rugby League Ireland ==
On Thursday 25 March 2004 six footballers were inducted into Rugby League Ireland's inaugural Hall of Fame at the Rugby League Heritage Centre in Huddersfield, they were; John "Jack" Daly (Huddersfield/Featherstone Rovers), Robert "Bob" Kelly (Keighley/Wakefield Trinity/Batley), Seamus McCallion (Halifax/Leeds/Bramley), Thomas "Tom" McKinney, (Salford/Warrington/St. Helens), Terry O'Connor (Salford/Wigan Warriors/Widnes Vikings), Patrick "Paddy" Reid (Huddersfield/Halifax).
