= Ernest Strathdee =

Rugby union player and broadcaster from Northern Ireland

- Born: 26 May 1921 Belfast, Northern Ireland
- Died: 17 July 1971 (aged 50) Belfast, Northern Ireland
- School: Belfast High School
- University: Queen's University Belfast
- Occupation: Broadcaster

Rugby union career
- Position: Scrum-half
International career
Years	Team	Apps	(Points)
1947–49	Ireland	9	(0)

Ernest Strathdee (26 May 1921 — 17 July 1971) was a rugby union international and broadcaster from Northern Ireland.

== Biography ==
=== Early life ===
Born in Belfast, Strathdee attended Belfast High School and Queen's University Belfast. He was an Ulster Senior Cup winner with Queen's University RFC in 1947.

=== Career ===
Capped nine times for Ireland at scrum-half, Strathdee was a member of the team from 1947 to 1949 and had two matches as captain, including against the visiting 1947–48 Wallabies. He was also led Ireland during their historic 1948 Five Nations campaign, captaining them for the opening fixture against France. After losing his place to Hugh de Lacy for the next two matches, Strathdee returned for the 6–3 win over Wales that secured the grand slam. He was a half-back partner to Queen's teammate Jack Kyle while in the Ireland XV.

Strathdee was a licensed presbyterian minister during his rugby years and later became a television broadcaster, getting his start in sports commentary. He chaired the weekly late-night weekly show What's it all about? on Ulster Television.

=== Death ===
In 1971, Strathdee died in a fire at the Regency Hotel in Belfast. The fire, which also killed two Canadian guests, swept through the top floor of the hotel and was believed to have started in Strathdee's room, after he fell asleep smoking a cigarette.

== See also ==
- List of Ireland national rugby union players
