= Seamus McCallion =

Former Ireland international rugby league footballer

Personal information
- Full name: Seamus McCallion
- Born: 10 April 1964 (age 62) Belfast, Northern Ireland

Playing information
- Position: Hooker
Club
Years	Team	Pld	T	G	FG	P
1983	Kent Invicta	4	0	0	0	0
1984–91	Halifax	200	30	0	3	123
1992	Leeds	0	0	0	0	0
1996	Bramley	2	0	0	0	0
2004	Gateshead Thunder	5	0	0	0	0
	Total	211	30	0	3	123
Representative
Years	Team	Pld	T	G	FG	P
1995–96	Ireland	3	1	0	0	4

Coaching information
Club
Years	Team	Gms	W	D	L	W%
2004	Gateshead Thunder	27	1	1	25	4

Seamus McCallion (born 10 April 1964) is an Irish former professional rugby league footballer who played in the 1980s and 1990s. He played at club level for Halifax, Leeds and Bramley, as a hooker.

== Playing career ==
=== Early career ===
McCallion started his career with Huddersfield-based amateur club Moldgreen, and was selected for the 1983 BARLA Young Lions tour of New Zealand. After playing a few games on trial at Kent Invicta during the 1983–84 season, he was signed by Halifax in March 1984.

=== Halifax ===
McCallion played in all 37-matches in Halifax's victory in the Championship during the 1985–86 season, scoring 7-tries in 30 League matches and 2 in Cup competitions.

McCallion played hooker, and scored a try in Halifax's 19–18 victory over St. Helens in the 1987 Challenge Cup Final during the 1986–87 season at Wembley Stadium, London on Saturday 2 May 1987, and played hooker in the 12–32 defeat by Wigan in the 1988 Challenge Cup Final during the 1987–88 season at Wembley Stadium, London on Saturday 30 April 1988.

McCallion played hooker in Halifax' 12–24 defeat by Wigan in the 1989–90 Regal Trophy Final during the 1989–90 season at Headingley, Leeds on Saturday 13 January 1990.

In 1992, McCallion was sold to Leeds as part of an exchange deal, but never made an appearance for the first team.

=== International honours ===
Seamus McCallion won caps for Ireland while Unattached, and at Bramley in 1995 and 1996 gaining 3-caps.

== Post-playing career ==
In 2003, McCallion was appointed as head coach of Gateshead Thunder. He was replaced by Dean Thomas a year later.

In November 2022, he was appointed as Head Physio at Hull.

== Personal life ==
McCallion's daughter, Orla, plays rugby league for Leeds Rhinos Women.

== Honoured by Rugby League Ireland ==
On 25 March 2004 six footballers were inducted into Rugby League Ireland's inaugural Hall of Fame at the Rugby League Heritage Centre in Huddersfield, they were; John "Jack" Daly (Huddersfield/Featherstone Rovers), Robert "Bob" Kelly (Keighley/Wakefield Trinity/Batley), Seamus McCallion (Halifax/Leeds/Bramley), Thomas "Tom" McKinney, (Salford/Warrington/St. Helens), Terry O'Connor (Salford/Wigan Warriors/Widnes Vikings), Patrick "Paddy" Reid (Huddersfield/Halifax).
