= Noel Henderson =

Irish rugby union player (1928–1997)

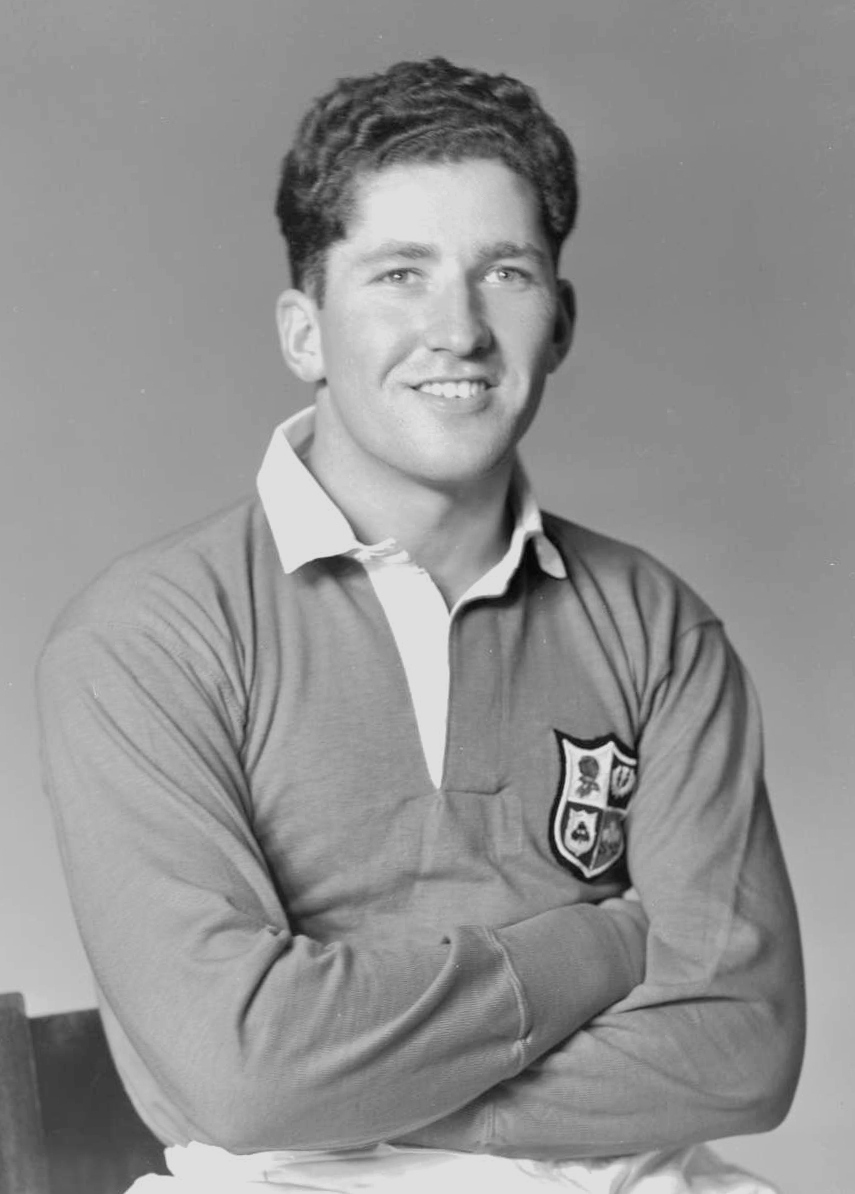
- Henderson in New Zealand in 1950
- Born: Noel Joseph Henderson; 10 August 1928 Drumahoe, Northern Ireland
- Died: 27 August 1997 (aged 69) Belfast, Northern Ireland
- School: Foyle College
- University: Queen's University Belfast

Rugby union career
- Position: Centre
Senior career
Years	Team	Apps	(Points)
1947–1951	Queen's University RFC		
- North of Ireland F.C.
International career
Years	Team	Apps	(Points)
1949–1959	Ireland	40	(54)
1950	British and Irish Lions	1	(0)

Noel Joseph Henderson (10 August 1928 – 27 August 1997) was a rugby union player from Northern Ireland who mostly played outside centre. He played club rugby with Queen's University, North, was capped forty times for Ireland and was a member of the British and Irish Lions team that toured New Zealand in 1950. Henderson later became a "dedicated" rugby administrator. He also played badminton for Ireland at international level. Following Henderson's death, a leading commentator wrote: "His place among the great figures of Irish Rugby is assured". Ireland and Lions great Jack Kyle picked Henderson as part of his greatest-ever Ulster team. Henderson was a pleasant, humorous man who once said: "The state of English rugby is always desperate but not serious … The state of Irish rugby is always serious but not desperate".

== Early life ==
Henderson was born in Drumahoe, County Londonderry. He attended Foyle College in Derry and then Queen's University Belfast. He was a superb player at school and at Queen's, with whom he won the Ulster Senior Cup in 1951.

== Playing career ==
His first appearance for Ireland came against Scotland in 1949 when he was 20 years old. He also played in the following game against Wales, where Ireland clinched both the Triple Crown and the Five Nations Championship. During the 1950 Five Nations, Henderson made only a single appearance for Ireland due to injury, but was still included in the British Lions squad that travelled to New Zealand and Australia that year. At that stage Henderson was a student at Queen's University. He played in a total of 15 matches during the tour, including in the third Test match against New Zealand where he played out of his normal position on the wing. The other matches Henderson played in were 10 tour games against local opposition in New Zealand, the match against the New Zealand Maori team, two tour games in Australia and an unofficial match against the Ceylon national team during a stopoff on the journey home.

Henderson played in all of Ireland's games in the Five Nations Championship between 1951 and 1955, with Ireland winning the Championship in 1951. In 1956, Henderson was made captain of the national team. Henderson scored the winning try in Ireland's 9–6 victory over Australia on 18 January 1958, during their tour of Europe. This was the first time Ireland had beaten one of the visiting Southern Hemisphere teams. He ran half the length of the pitch to touch down halfway between the goalposts and the touchline. In all he captained his country 11 times. Henderson scored several very important drop-goals for Ireland.

In his last game as Ireland captain in 1958 against France, Ronnie Dawson taking over from him, Henderson switched position from centre to full-back. He finished his international career at full-back, playing all four games in the 1959 Five Nations championship in the position. Henderson's 40 caps for Ireland placed him fourth at the all-time international appearances list at the time of his retirement from international rugby; five of these came on the wing.

Henderson played four times for the Barbarians, against East Midlands in 1951, Cardiff and Swansea in 1955 and as captain against Swansea in 1956.

In 1953 Henderson was part of the Queen's University team that toured North America.

== Badminton ==
Henderson's considerable athletic ability enabled him to play representative badminton with his brother George.

== Post-playing career ==
Following his retirement from playing rugby, he became a rugby administrator for his club NIFC and for the Ulster branch of the Irish Rugby Football Union (IRFU). He was an Irish selector and became elected president of the Irish Rugby Football Union for the 1990–91 season.

== Family ==
In June 1953, Henderson married Irish hockey international Elizabeth (Betty) Kyle, brother of Jack, in Fortwilliam Presbyterian Church; they had four daughters His brother George and nephew Graham Henderson were both Irish badminton internationals. Two of his grandchildren, Michael Craig and Hannah Craig, were international squash players for Ireland.
