= Jack Kyle =

Ireland and Lions rugby union player (1926–2014)

Jack Kyle OBE
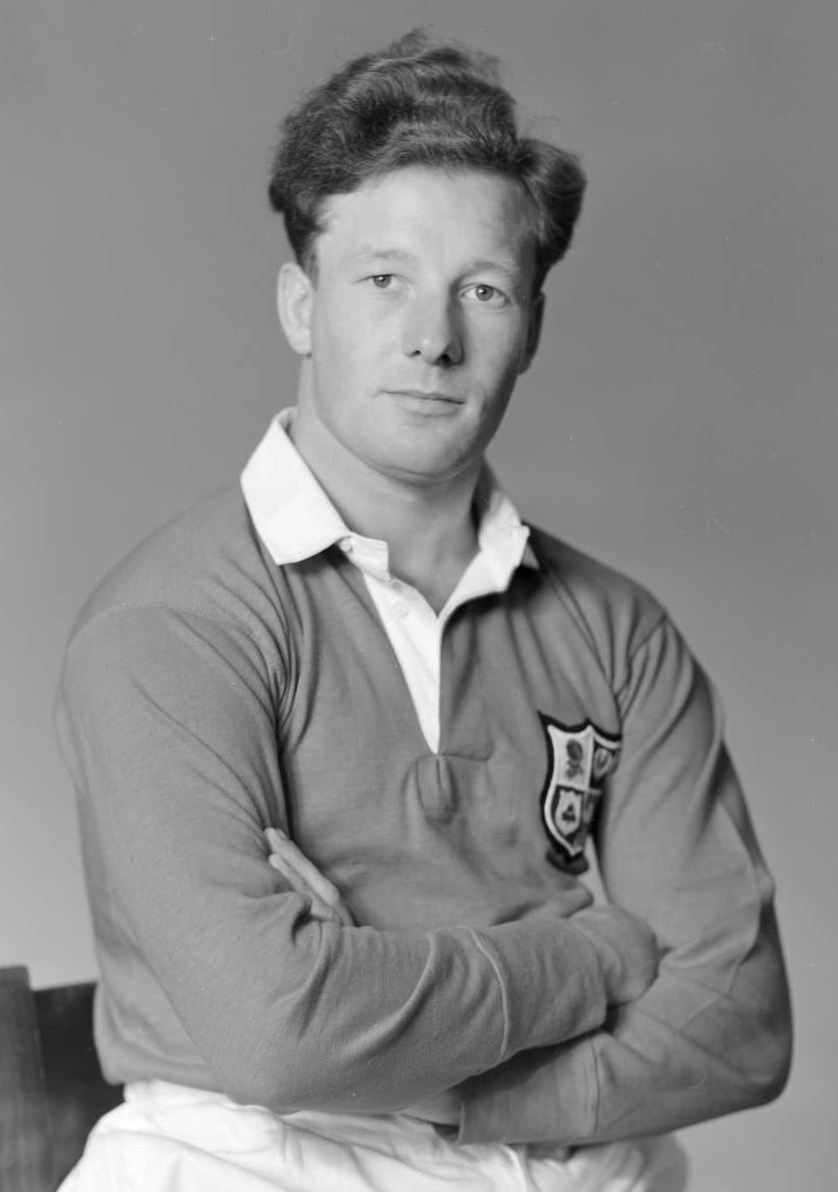
- Kyle in 1950
- Born: John Wilson Kyle; 10 February 1926 Belfast, Northern Ireland
- Died: 28 November 2014 (aged 88) Bryansford, Northern Ireland
- School: Belfast Royal Academy
- University: Queen's University Belfast

Rugby union career
- Position: Out-half
Senior career
Years	Team	Apps	(Points)
- Queen's University
–	North of Ireland		
Provincial / State sides
Years	Team	Apps	(Points)
- Ulster
International career
Years	Team	Apps	(Points)
1946–1958	Ireland	46	(24)
1950	British and Irish Lions	6	(6)
1948–1954	Barbarians	8	(3)

John Wilson Kyle (10 February 1926 – 27 November 2014), most commonly known as Jack Kyle, was a rugby union player who represented Ireland, the British and Irish Lions and the Barbarians during the 1940s and 1950s. Kyle was a member of the Irish team that won the grand slam in the 1948 Five Nations Championship. In 1950, Kyle was declared one of the six players of the year by the New Zealand Rugby Almanac. Kyle is a member of the International Rugby Hall of Fame and was inducted into the IRB Hall of Fame before the two halls merged to form the current World Rugby Hall of Fame. He was named the "Greatest Ever Irish Rugby Player" by the Irish Rugby Football Union in 2002.

Kyle was educated at Belfast Royal Academy and studied medicine at Queen's University Belfast. He graduated in 1951 and, in 1991, was awarded an honorary doctorate by the university. After Queen's he was a member of North of Ireland. In 2007, he was awarded a Lifetime Achievement Award by the Irish Journal of Medical Science and the Royal Academy of Medicine in Ireland. He received an OBE in 1959.

== Early life ==
Kyle was born in Kinnaird Street off the lower Antrim Road, Belfast; aged seven, the family of two boys and three girls moved with parents John Kyle and Elizabeth Warren to the Old Westland Road. Kyle was educated at nearby BRA from 1930–1944 and was head boy.

== Rugby career ==
=== Early career ===
Kyle played for Ulster Schools in 1943 and 1944, also captaining the Ulster Schools Cricket team. Early into his medical studies at Queen's, where he later won an Ulster Senior Cup medal, he was called up to the Ulster Senior XV. He lifted a second Ulster Senior Cup with North in 1955.

=== Ireland ===
Kyle first played for Ireland during the Second World War in a friendly against a British Army XV. However, no caps were awarded. He made his official debut for Ireland on 25 January 1947 against France in the 1947 Five Nations Championship in an 8–12 defeat Lansdowne Road. Between 1947 and 1958, he went on to make 46 full appearances and score 24 points, including seven tries.

The highlight of his Ireland career came during the 1948 Five Nations Championship when he helped Ireland win a grand slam. Kyle played in all four games and he is often credited with masterminding Ireland's success. In 1949, he also helped Ireland win the Triple Crown and, in 1951, they won the title again. Kyle made his last appearance for Ireland against Scotland on 1 March 1958. Following a solo try against France at Ravenhill in 1953, an impressed newspaper journalist parodied The Scarlet Pimpernel with the lines:

They seek him here, they seek him there
Those Frenchies seek him everywhere.
That paragon of pace and guile,
That damned elusive Jackie Kyle.

=== British and Irish Lions ===
In 1950, Kyle also played for the British Lions on their tour to New Zealand and Australia. He played in 20 of the 29 games, including all six Tests. Among his tour highlights was a display that came in the first Test, a 9–9 draw with New Zealand. Of the Lions' nine points, Kyle scored a try, created another for Ken Jones and won a penalty that was converted by John Robins. During the tour, he also scored a try in the 24–3 defeat of Australia.

=== Barbarians ===
Kyle made eight appearances for the Barbarians between 1948 and 1954, scoring three points.

== Later years ==
After retiring from club rugby in 1963, Kyle embarked on humanitarian work in Sumatra and Indonesia. Between 1966 and 2000, he worked as a consultant surgeon in Chingola, Zambia. For his work in Africa, Kyle received a Lifetime Achievement Award from the Royal Academy of Medicine in Ireland and the Irish Journal of Medical Science.

He then returned to Northern Ireland and settled in County Down. He remained involved in rugby and in 2001, established the Jack Kyle Bursary Fund in support of the Queen's University RFC Rugby Academy.

Kyle died on 28 November 2014 after a prolonged illness and is survived by his son Caleb, daughter Justine and nephew David.

Kyle's children unveiled a plaque in his honour at Ulster Rugby on 10 February 2026 – on what would have been their father's 100th birthday.

His sister Elizabeth (Betty) was married to Kyle's international team-mate and close friend Noel Henderson.

Kyle was very proud of the all-island composition of Irish rugby and abhorred the "melding of unionism with religious bigotry".

== Honours ==
Ireland

- Five Nations Championship
  - Winner (3): 1948, 1949, 1951
