= Malone RFC =

Irish rugby union club, based in Belfast

(Northern Ireland) Malone
- Full name: Malone Rugby Football Club
- Union: (Ireland) IRFU
- Branch: Ulster
- Nickname: The Cregagh Red Sox
- Founded: 1892; 134 years ago
- Ground(s): Gibson Park, Cregagh, Belfast
- Chairman: Stuart Duncan
- President: Gareth Millar
- Coach: Josh Pentland
- Captain: Ross Todd
- League: A.I.L. Div. 2B
- 2024–25: 7th.
Team kit

Official website
- malonerfc.co.uk

Malone RFC (Malone Rugby Football Club) is a rugby union club based in Belfast, in Northern Ireland playing in the Division 2B of the All-Ireland League. The club is affiliated with the Ulster Branch, itself part of the Irish Rugby Football Union. It is one of the last remaining Belfast rugby clubs not to have amalgamated and still plays at its original ground. As well as its successful Senior teams, it has a thriving Youth and Mini structure, and was the first Mini rugby team from Ireland to play in the renowned Fundacion Cisneros International rugby tournament in Madrid.

== History ==
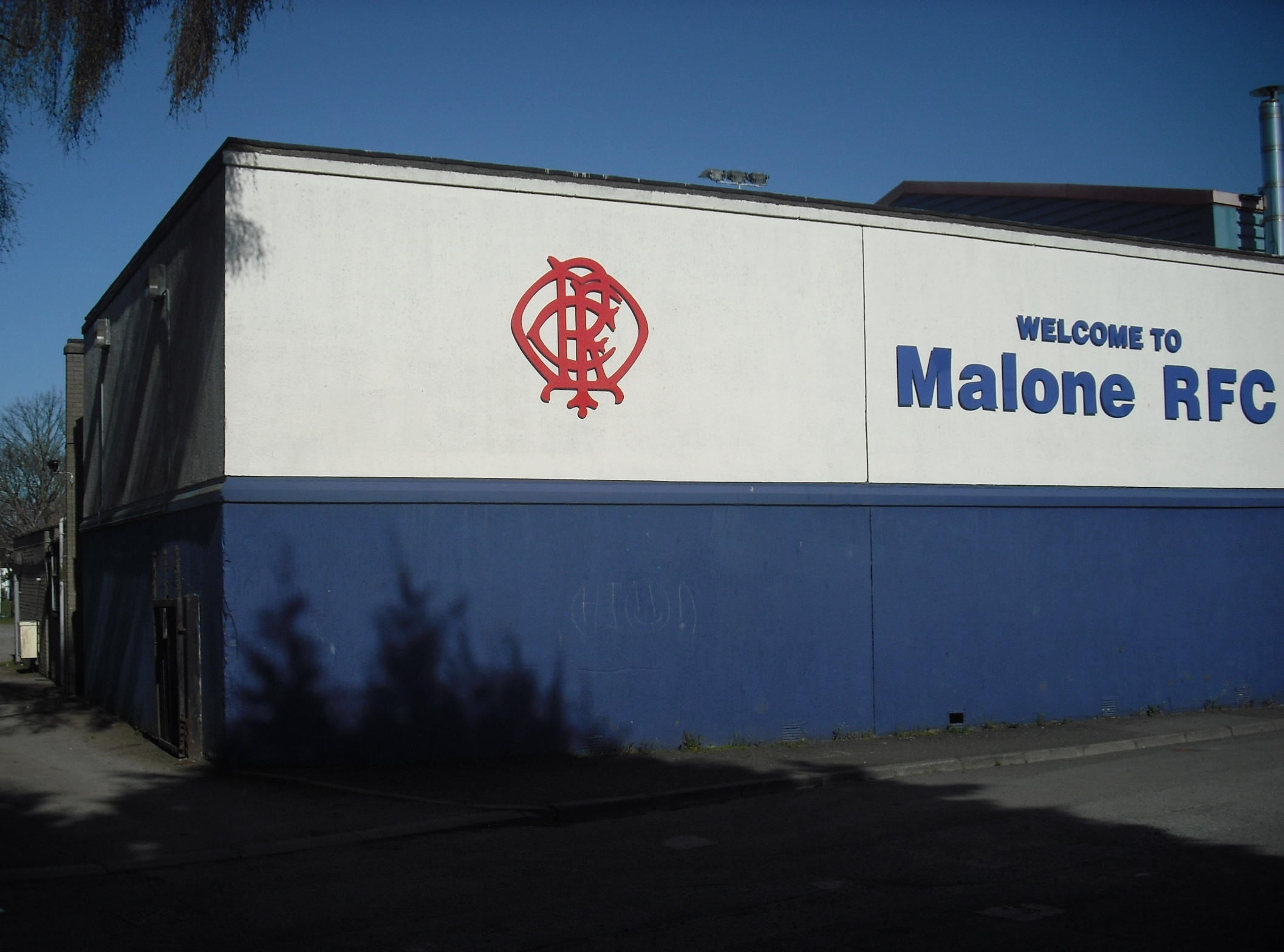
Malone's Gibson Park ground

Malone Football Club was founded in 1892 by residents of Malone Park, Belfast. In 1896 Malone obtained senior status after two victories in the junior league. Malone first played a non-Irish side when it hosted Furness in 1903. The current name Malone Rugby Football Club was adopted in 1932. Malone moved to its present location in Gibson Park, Belfast in 1935, eventually purchasing it in 1953. The present clubhouse dates from 1967. The club hosted games from the 2007 Under 19 Rugby World Championship.

== Honours ==
- Ulster Senior Cup: (7)
  1903-04, 1904–05, 1906–07, 1970–71, 1983–84, 1987–88, 1991–92
- Ulster Senior League: (6)
  1903-04, 1904–05, 1905–06, 1906–07, 1968–69, 1992–93
- Ulster Junior Cup:† (5)
  1931-32, 1967-68, 1974-75, 1977-78, 1980-81
- All-Ireland League Division 2A: (1)
  2017-2018

† Won by 2nd XV

== Notable players ==
(British & Irish Lions) British and Irish Lions

- Alfred Tedford (1903)
- Reg W Edwards (1904)
- Tom Smyth (1910)
- Blair Mayne (1938)
- Jimmy E Nelson (1950)

Ireland

- John Hewitt Ferris (?1875–1903), Scrum Half. 3 caps (1900).
- Alfred Tedford (1877–1942), Forward. 23 caps,(1902–1908), 6 Tries.
- Reg W Edwards (1882–1913), Forward. 1 cap (1904).
- Hugh Gilmer Wilson (1879–1941), Forward. 18 caps, (1905–1910).
- George McIldowie (1886–1953), Forward. 4 caps, (1906–1910), 1 Try.
- R(ichard?) E(dwin?) Forbes (1880-?), Forward. 1 cap (1907).
- Tom Smyth (1884–1924), Prop. 14 caps, (1908–1912), 2 Tries.
- William Victor Edwards (1887–1917), Forward. 2 caps, (1912).
- William Ernest Crawford (1891–1959), Fullback. 30 caps, (1920–1927), 6 conversions and 2 penalties.
- Norman G Ross (?1904-), No. 8. 2 caps, (1927).
- Blair Mayne (1915–1955), Lock. 6 caps,(1937–1939), 1 Try.
- Jack Deryck Erle Monteith (1922–1992), Centre. 3 caps, (1947).
- Ernest Strathdee (1921–1971), Scrum Half. 9 caps (1947–1949).
- Robert D Agar (1920–1998), No. 8. 10 caps (1947–1950).
- Jimmy E Nelson (1921–2014), Lock. 16 caps, (1947–1954).
- Dennis Scott (1933-), Flanker. 3 caps, (1961–1962).
- Aidan Malachy Brady (1939-), Hooker. 4 caps, (1966–1968).
- Sam A Hutton (1940-), Prop. 4 caps, (1967).
- Bill Brown (1943-), Wing. 4 caps, (1970), 1 Try.
- Willie Duncan (1957-), Flanker. 2 caps (1984).
- John P McDonald (1960-), Hooker. 4 caps (1987–1990).
- W Denis McBride (1964-), Flanker. 32 caps, (1988–1997), 4 Tries.
- Colin Wilkinson (1961-), Fullback. 1 cap (1993).
- Maurice Field (1964-), Centre, 17 caps (1994–1997).
- Neil Best (1979-), Flanker. 18 caps, (2005–2007), 2 Tries.
- Tom Court (1980-), Prop. 9 caps (2008-).
- Chris Henry (1984-), Flanker. 11 caps (2010-), 1 Try.
- Neve Jones (1998-), Hooker, flanker. 39 Caps, 55 points. First female to represent Malone RFC at international level

Scotland

- Simon Danielli, (1979-), Wing. 24 caps (2003-), 6 Tries.

United States

- Paul Emerick (2003-), Centre/Wing. 37 caps, 10 Tries.
