= Howard Campbell =

Howard Campbell MC
- Full name: Howard Hindmarsh Campbell
- Born: 10 November 1921 Machakos, Kenya Colony
- Died: 23 February 2012 (aged 90) Reading, England
- School: Oundle School
- University: University of Cambridge
- Occupation: Civil engineer

Rugby union career
- Position: Prop
International career
Years	Team	Apps	(Points)
1947–48	Scotland	4	(0)

Howard Hindmarsh Campbell (10 November 1921 — 23 February 2012) was a Scottish international rugby union player.

Campbell was born in Machakos, near Nairobi. His family were in Kenya through his Perthshire raised father's work as a civil engineer with the public works department. He boarded at Oundle School and attended the University of Cambridge.

In World War II, Campbell served as a Lieutenant in the Royal Engineers. He was awarded a Military Cross for gallantry while taking part in the liberation of North Brabant in the Netherlands.

Campbell, a prop, gained a blue for Cambridge University in the 1946 Varsity Match and the following year won the first of his four Scotland caps, debuting against Ireland at Murrayfield. He also played rugby for London Scottish.

A civil engineer, Campbell lived in South Africa, Sri Lanka and South Africa while working for Shell.

== See also ==
- List of Scotland national rugby union players
