= Bertie O'Hanlon =

Irish rugby union player

- Full name: Bartholomew Reginald O'Hanlon
- Born: 23 October 1924 Ballyclogh, Co. Cork, Ireland
- Died: 25 September 2016 (aged 91) Cork, Ireland
- School: Rockwell College
- Occupation: Insurance executive

Rugby union career
- Position: Wing
International career
Years	Team	Apps	(Points)
1947–50	Ireland	12	(9)

Bartholomew Reginald O'Hanlon (23 October 1924 – 25 September 2016) was an Irish international rugby union player active in the 1940s and 1950s.

== Biography ==
Born in Ballyclogh, County Cork, O'Hanlon attended Rockwell College from age 12 and won a Munster Schools Senior Cup in 1942. He was a substitute for Cork Constitution when they won the 1943 Munster Senior Cup, while still a schoolboy, then featured in two Cup-winning teams with Dolphin after leaving Rockwell.

Between 1947 and 1950, O'Hanlon was an Ireland wing three-quarter during a successful period for the national team, playing all matches in their 1948 grand slam and 1949 triple crown sides. He scored two tries on debut against England at Lansdowne Road and finished his career with a total of 12 caps.

O'Hanlon became the last surviving member of the 1948 grand slam side when Paddy Reid died in January 2016.

== See also ==
- List of Ireland national rugby union players
