= Civil Service Rugby Club =

Rugby team in Northern Ireland

Civil Service NI RFC
- Full name: Civil Service NI Rugby Football Club
- Nickname: Service
- Founded: 1922; 104 years ago
- Location: Maynard Sinclair Pavilion Stormont Estate Belfast Northern Ireland BT4 3TA
- Ground: Stormont Pavilion
- Chairman: P. Anderson
- President: M. Magill
- Captain: M. Martin
- League: Ulster Championship 3
Team kit

Official website
- www.csnirfc.co.uk

Civil Service NI Rugby Football Club is a rugby union club based in Maynard Sinclair Pavilion of Belfast, Northern Ireland. The club was formed in the autumn of 1922 by staff of the newly established Northern Ireland Civil Service. After some years of success playing at a junior level, the club was given senior status by the Ulster Branch in the 1928/29 season and celebrated by winning the senior league at its first attempt. Up until World War II, Civil Service teams enjoyed high placings in the league tables but struggled to convert good performances into trophies.

Playing performances however improved steadily throughout the 1950s and 1960s, Service junior teams won league and cup competitions and the 1st XV won the Ulster Senior League in 1969-70. They also enjoyed something of a tradition in sevens winning a number of the premier competitions in Ulster at that time. In more recent times Civil Service has competed at more modest levels as it no longer has senior status. However, the Club also enjoyed successes in league and cup competitions in the 1990s. The 1st XV won the McCrea Cup in 1998, followed by triumphs in Qualifying League 3 and the North Down Cup.

== Club Captains ==
2025 - 26 - M. Martin

2024 - 25 - J. Mooney

2022 - 24 - C. Stone

2020 - 22 - J. Duffin

2019 - 20 - P. Hoskins

2018 - 19 - H. Matheson

2016 - 18 - B. Morgan

2014 - 16 - C. Burns

2012 - 14 - M. Murray

2011 - 12 - B. Scott

2009 - 11 - D. Cartland

2007 - 09 - J. P. Cartwright

2006 - 07 - S. Gray

2004 - 06 - M. McLaughlin

2003 - 04 - A. Millar

2002 - 03 - A. P. Neeson

2001 - 02 - M. Goldsborough

2000 - 01 - E. Williamson

1999 - 00 - G. Ellis

1997 - 99 - M. McGuigan

1996 - 97 - M. Curran

1995 - 96 - B. McMillan

1994 - 95 - I. T. Millar

1993 - 94 - P. Foy

1991 - 93 - B. McMillan

1989 - 91 - C. G. H. O'Connor

1988 - 89 - R. J. Millar

1986 - 88 - S. McMorran

1985 - 86 - K. McCollum

1984 - 85 - E. J. H. Weir

1982 - 84 - J. P. Bill

1981 - 82 - S. Robinson

1980 - 81 - E. J. H. Weir

1979 - 80 - M. S. R. McLean

1978 - 79 - W. J. McKinney

1976 - 78 - J. G. Rodgers

1975 - 76 - W. J. McKinney

1974 - 75 - J. W. Ferris

1973 - 74 - D. M. Crothers

1972 - 73 - W. F. Rodgers

1971 - 72 - T. F. Dunlop

1969 - 71 - L. M. Hunter

1966 - 69 - T. Johnston

1965 - 66 - D. H.Bell

1964 - 65 - J. Hanna

1963 - 64 - J. J. Kyle

1962 - 63 - S. W. Lindsay

1961 - 62 - T. Johnston

1960 - 61 - R. J. Anderson

1958 - 60 - D. E. K Boyd

1957 - 58 - S. W. Lindsay

1956 - 57 - W. Neagle

1955 - 56 - K. H. Clarke

1953 - 55 - J. F. Davidson

1951 - 52 - J. D. W. Mills

1949 - 51 - J. B. Mills

1947 - 49 - J. A. D. Higgins

1946 - 47 - R. J. Christie

1945 - 46 - S. J. Edgar

1944 - 45 - J. A. Young

1943 - 44 - S. J. Edgar

1942 - 43 - J. A. D. Higgins

1941 - 42 - J. A. Young

1940 - 41 - W. D O'Neill

1939 - 40 - S. J. Edgar

1938 - 39 - R. Shaw

1937 - 38 - S. M. Morgan

1935 - 37 - R. M. Greeves

1934 - 35 - H. O. H. O'Neill

1932 - 34 - G. C. H. Siggins

1931 - 32 - S. M. Morgan

1930 - 31 - H. O. H. O'Neill

1929 - 30 - G. C. H. Siggins

1928 - 29 - L. B. Jago

1927 - 28 - R. R. Butler

1926 - 27 - G. C. H. Siggins

1924 - 26 - T. Shanks

1923 - 24 - W. Jebb

1922 - 23 - H. Frame

== Club Presidents ==
2024 - M. Magill

2021 - 24 - S. McMorran

2019 - 21 - N. Palmer

2016 - 19 - M. Heath

2014 - 16 - B. McCreight

2013 - 14 - G. Rodgers

2008 - 13 - S. McMorran

2006 - 08 - D. Fusco

2004 - 06 - J. G. Rodgers

2002 - 04 - S. B. Mercer

2000 - 02 - W. L. McDowell

1998 - 00 - W. D. McKeeman

1996 - 98 - J. L. Townson

1994 - 96 - E. R. Wilkie

1991 - 94 - S. W. Lindsay, U.D.

1989 - 91 - J. N. Campbell

1988 - 89 - Sir K. Bloomfield, K.C.B.

1987 - 88 - D. Fusco

1985 - 87 - L. E. Arneill

1983 - 85 - K. R. Boyd

1982 - 83 - H. C. Lucas

1981 - 82 - D. D. Owens

1980 - 81 - J. A. Lewis

1979 - 80 - R. S. MacElhinney

1978 - 79 - R. J. Anderson

1977 - 78 - R. J. Simms

1976 - 77 - T. Mc. Nesbitt

1975 - 76 - S. W. Lindsay, U.D.

1974 - 75 - C. J. Platt

1973 - 74 - J. A. Lewis

1972 - 73 - J. A. D. Higgins

1970 - 72 - L. E. Arneill

1969 - 70 - S. J. Edgar

1967 - 69 - L. C. Dennis, M.B.E.

1964 - 67 - R. R. Butler, O.B.E.

1962 - 64 - Sir R. Dunbar, K.B.E., C.B.

1960 - 62 - W. A. Leitch, C.B.

1959 - 60 - L. B. Lagoe

1955 - 59 - Prof. H. G. Lamont, C.B.E.

1953 - 55 - E. A. F. Johnston, C.B.E.

1951 - 53 - J. F. Caldwell, Q.C., C.B.

1949 - 51 - R. S. Brownell, C.B.E.

1947 - 49 - W. H. Smyth, M.B.E.

1946 - 47 - J. A. McKeown, C.B.E.

1945 - 46 - H. V. V. Thompson, O.B.E.

1943 - 45 - E. S. Scales, C.B.E.

1939 - 43 - J. Taylor, O.B.E.

1938 - 39 - G. S. Robertson

1937 - 38 - J. I. Cook, C.B., O.B.E.

1935 - 37 - Capt. C. H. Petherick, C.B.E.

1934 - 35 - S. Sloan, O.B.E.

1933 - 34 - Brig. Gen. H. G. Young, C.I.E. D.S.O.

1932 - 33 - G. C. Duggan, C.B., O.B.E.

1931 - 32 - R. E. Thornley, C.B.

1928 - 31 - Lt. Col. Sir. W. B. Spender, K.C.B., C.B.E., D.S.O., M.C.

1925 - 28 - F. H. Kerr

1922 - 25 - Major G. A. Harris, C.B.E., D.S.O.

== Adult Rugby ==
The health of the current club is built on the foundations put in place by the likes of former 2nd XV Manager Aaron Thompson and Welsh flanker Bryn Sturgeon who helped bring in a raft of new players over a decade ago. Indeed this group of players became the spine of the senior sides over the past decade and led to a resurgence in form and fortune in 2012 the 2nd XV got promotion to the Junior rugby section of Ulster rugby. The Club went on to reclaim both the Wolfhound Cup and the Old Campbellian's Boxing Day Cup after years without their hands on the respective cups.

=== Historic 1st XV League Performance ===
Year	League	Pos	Played	Won	Drawn	Lost	Points Scored	Points Conceded	Points	Captain	Win %
2004/05	Qualifying 4	3	20	14	0	6	276	239	28	Mark McLaughlin	70%
2005/06	Qualifying 3	7	17	6	1	10	314	503	13	Mark McLaughlin	35%
2006/07	Qualifying 3	8	18	5	0	13	158	454	10	Stephen Gray	28%
2007/08	Qualifying 3	8	14	7	1	6	158	169	15	Jonny Cartwright	50%
2008/09	Qualifying 3	11	10	4	1	5	202	217	9	Jonny Cartwright	40%
2009/10	Qualifying 3	13	15	3	0	12	130	259	6	Dan Cartland	20%
2010/11	Qualifying 3	6	15	5	0	10	213	388	10	Dan Cartland	33%
2011/12	Qualifying 3	4	16	6	0	10	185	253	12	Ben Scott	38%
2012/13	Qualifying 3a	4	18	11	1	6	395	297	20	Michael Murray	61%
2013/14	Qualifying 4	4	18	6	1	11	206	354	13	Michael Murray	33%
2014/15	Qualifying 4	3	18	10	0	8	337	280	20	Chris Burns	56%

The club had its most successful league campaign in almost a decade under then Captain Michael Murray 2012-13.

== Honours ==
Ulster Senior Cup: Runner up 1933-34

Ulster Senior League: Winners 1928/29, 1969/70

Ulster Junior Cup: Runner up 1967-68

McCrea Cup: Winners 1997-98

== Distinguished Players ==
The Club has a long tradition of producing players, referees and officials who gained international and representative recognition. Several players were capped by Ulster and Ireland, while others who passed through the ranks of Service teams achieved similar honours, including British Lions status. The Club has provided 4 Presidents of the Ulster Branch and others who served on various committees.

The Club's most distinguished son was perhaps Dudley Higgins, an accomplished full back, who gained caps during the 1948 Five Nations Championship, and in doing so became one of the elite band of players who have won a Grand Slam for Ireland. Dudley went on to become President of the Ulster Branch in 1960/61 and of the IRFU in 1976-77.
