= Vic Roberts =

British Lions & England international rugby union player

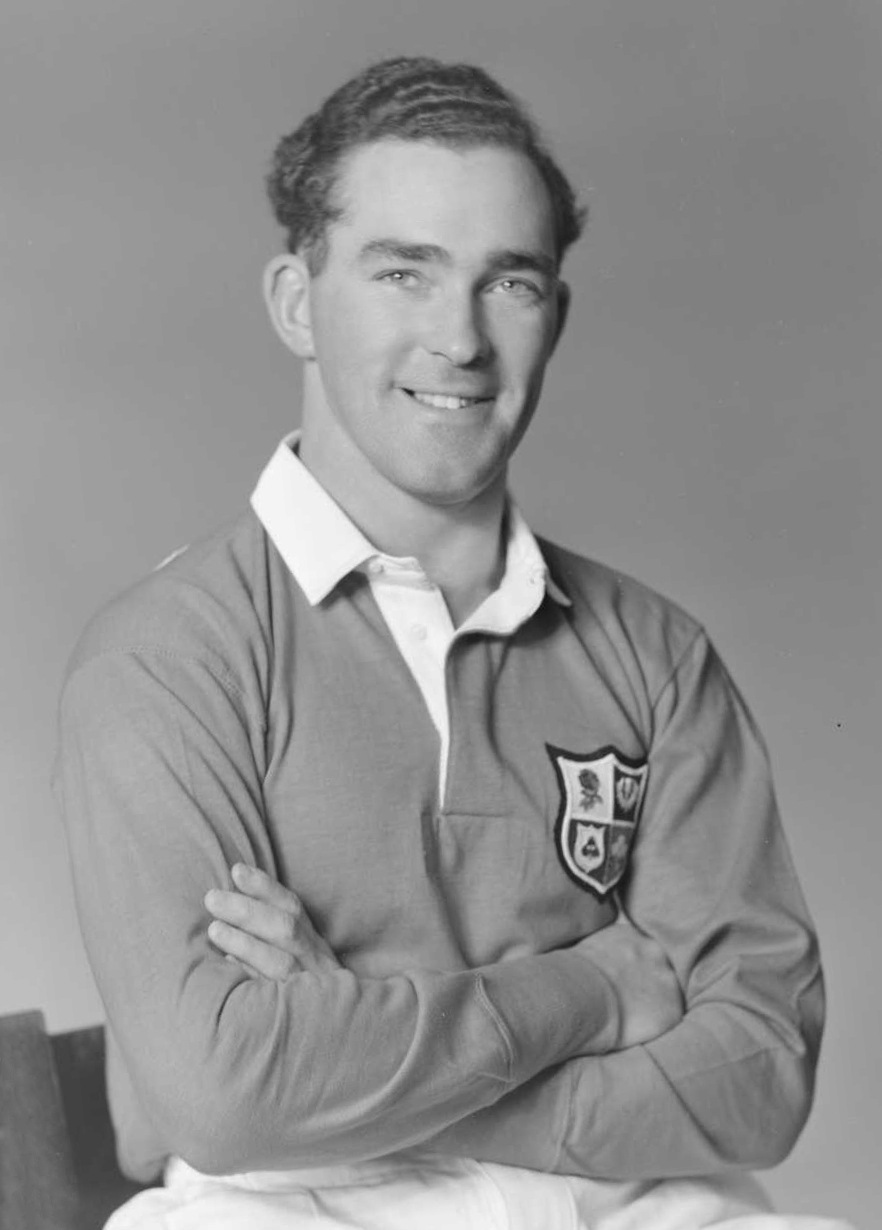
- Roberts in 1950
- Born: Victor George Roberts; 6 August 1924 Penryn, Cornwall, England
- Died: 14 March 2004 (aged 79) Horsham, West Sussex
- School: Falmouth Grammar School

Rugby union career
- Position: Flanker
Senior career
Years	Team	Apps	(Points)
- Penryn RFC
–	Harlequin F.C.		
–	Swansea RFC		
–	Barbarian F.C.		
International career
Years	Team	Apps	(Points)
1947–1956	England	16	(6)

Victor George Roberts (6 August 1924 – 14 March 2004) was an English rugby union player.

== Biography ==
Vic Roberts was capped 16 times for the England national rugby union team between 1947 and 1956. He was also captain of the Roses XV in 1951. He was part of the British Lions in 1950 against Australia and New Zealand. He was later vice-president and co-selector for the Lions.

At club level, Roberts played for Penryn and Harlequins before transferring to Swansea when his job in Customs and Excise took him to the town. He also played for invitational touring side the Barbarians and later became their vice-president.
