= Jim McCarthy (rugby union) =

Irish rugby union player

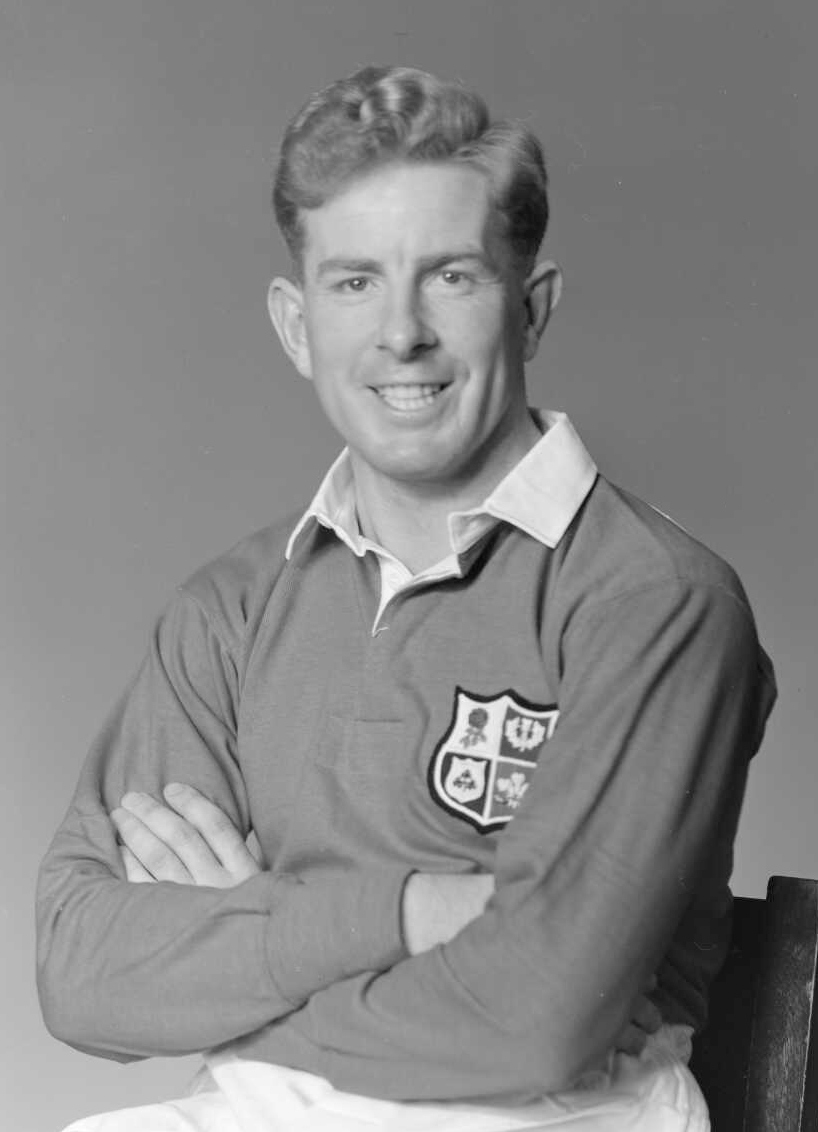
- McCarthy in New Zealand in 1950
- Born: James Stephen McCarthy; 30 June 1924 Cork, Ireland
- Died: 21 April 2015 (aged 90)

Rugby union career
- Position: Flanker
Amateur team(s)
Years	Team	Apps	(Points)
- Dolphin RFC
–	Blackrock College RFC		
Senior career
Years	Team	Apps	(Points)
- Munster
International career
Years	Team	Apps	(Points)
1948–1955	Ireland	28	(24)
1950	The Lions	13	

James Stephen McCarthy (30 June 1924 – 21 April 2015) was an Irish rugby union player who played for Munster, the Irish national team, and the British and Irish Lions. He was a member of the Grand Slam winning Irish squad in the 1948 Five Nations Championship.
