= Dai Davies (rugby union, born 1925) =

Welsh rugby union player

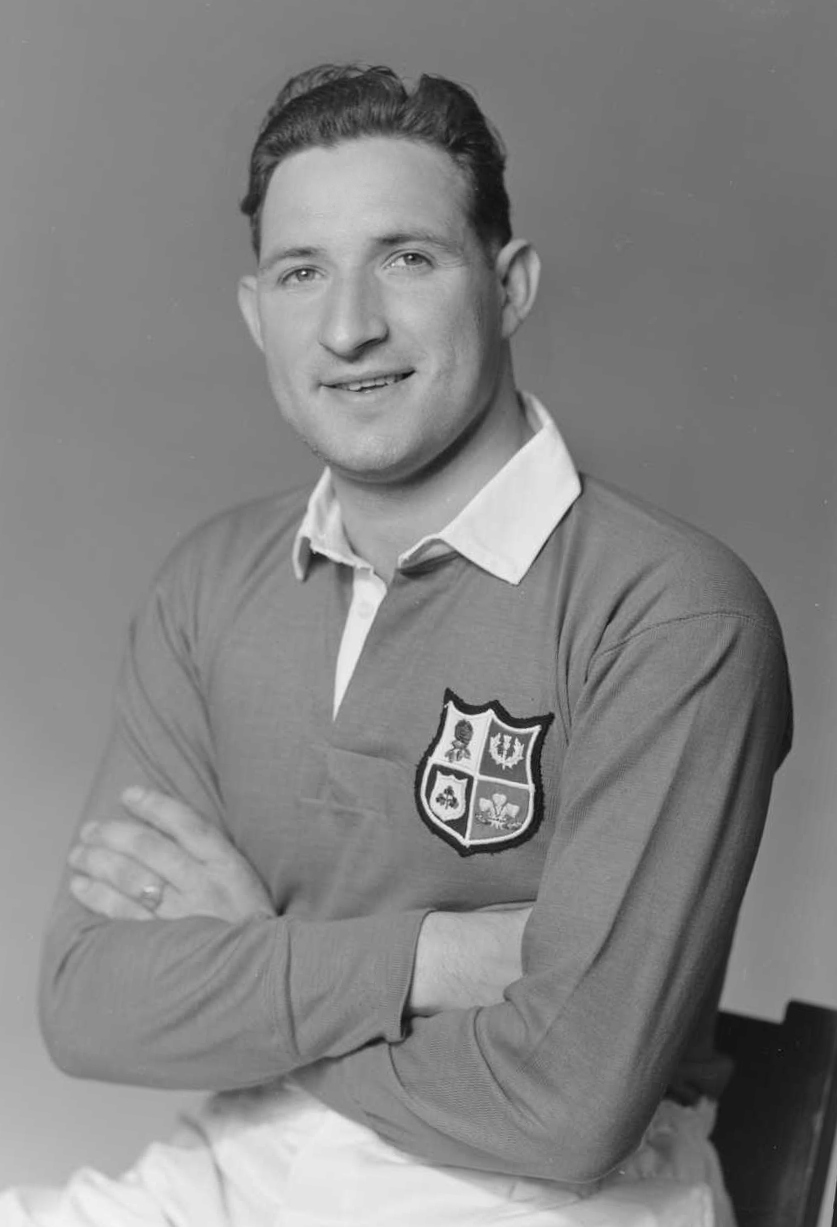
- Davies in New Zealand in 1950
- Born: David Maldwyn Davies; 2 May 1925 Penygraig, Wales
- Died: 25 September 2003 (aged 78) Taunton, England
- School: Craig yr Eos School

Rugby union career
- Position: Hooker
Amateur team(s)
Years	Team	Apps	(Points)
- Penygraig RFC
–	Somerset Police		
–	British Police		
–	Somerset		
–	Barbarian F.C.		
International career
Years	Team	Apps	(Points)
1950-1954	Wales	17	(0)
1950	British Lions	3	(0)

David "Dai" Maldwyn Davies (2 May 1925 – 25 September 2003) was a Wales and British Lions international rugby union player.

Davies made his debut for Wales on 21 January 1950 versus England and was selected for the 1950 British Lions tour to New Zealand and Australia. He played club rugby for Somerset Police.
