= Des O'Brien =

Irish rugby union player

- Full name: Desmond Joseph O'Brien
- Born: 22 May 1919 Dublin, Ireland
- Died: 26 December 2005 (aged 86) Lasswade, Scotland
- School: Belvedere College
- Occupation: Business executive

Rugby union career
- Position: No. 8
International career
Years	Team	Apps	(Points)
1948–52	Ireland	20	(3)

Desmond Joseph O'Brien (22 May 1919 — 26 December 2005) was an Irish rugby union international.

O'Brien, born in Dublin and educated at Belvedere College, was a back-row forward. After winning two Leinster Senior Cup titles with Old Belvedere, his job with Guinness brought him to London in the 1940s, during which time played for Wasps and London Irish, captaining the latter. By the early 1950s, O'Brien worked in Wales and had two seasons with Cardiff.

A Leinster representative player, O'Brien was capped 20 times for Ireland. Debuting as a 28-year old in 1948, he played three of four Tests in that year's Five Nations Championship, with Ireland achieving the grand slam. He captained Ireland against the touring Springboks in 1951, for the 1952 Five Nations and on the 1952 tour of South America.

O'Brien was team manager on the 1966 British Lions tour.

Since the 1960s, O'Brien lived in the Edinburgh area and held executive roles in the brewery industry. He was General Manager of Guinness Scotland and later a Director at Harp Lager.

== See also ==
- List of Ireland national rugby union players
