= Peter Kininmonth =

British Lions & Scotland international rugby union player

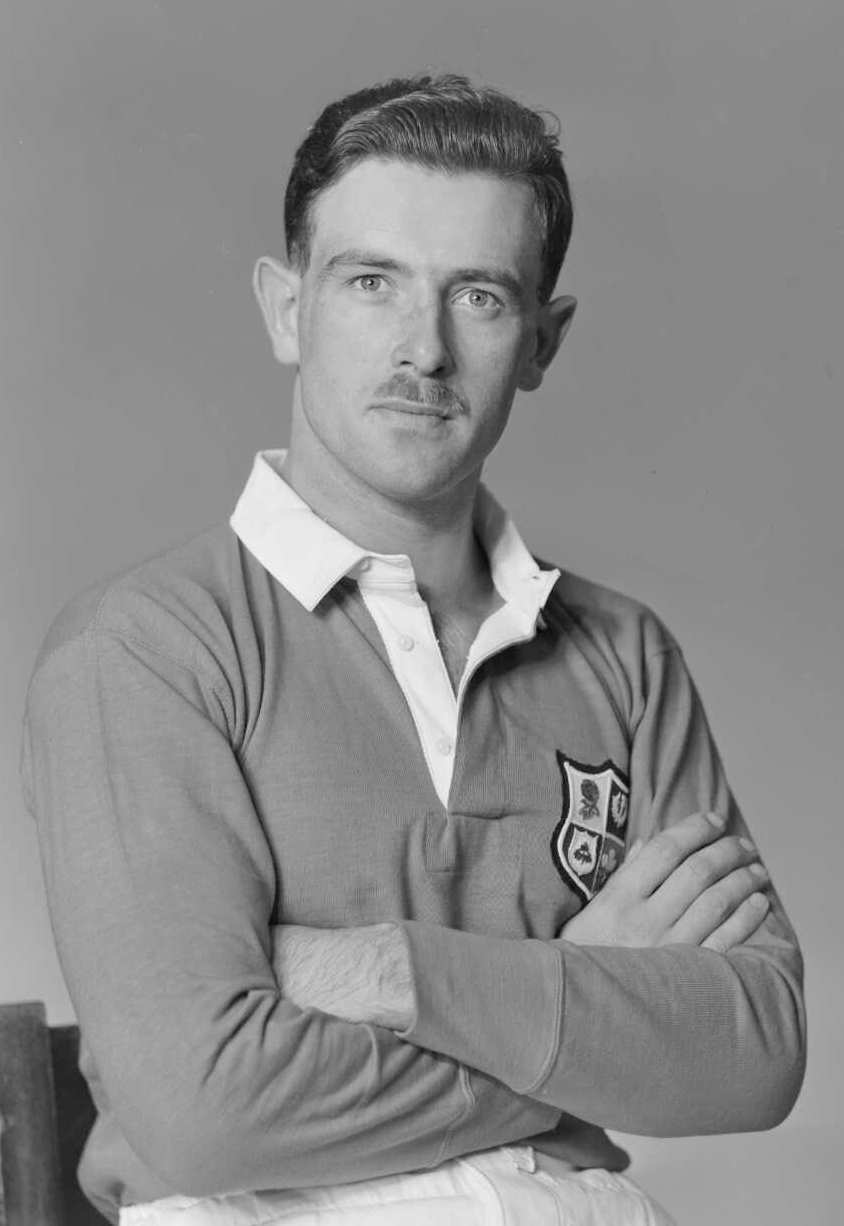
- Kininmonth in New Zealand in 1950
- Born: Peter Kininmonth; 23 June 1924 Bebington, Merseyside, England
- Died: 5 October 2007 (aged 83) Ashmore, England

Rugby union career
Amateur team(s)
| Years | Team | Apps | (Points) |
| – | Oxford University | | |
| – | Richmond RFC | | |
International career
| Years | Team | Apps | (Points) |
| – | Scotland | | |
| – | British and Irish Lions | | |

Peter Wyatt Kininmonth (23 June 1924 – 5 October 2007) was a Scottish international rugby union player, who played for Scotland and the Lions. He also played for Oxford University and Richmond RFC. He was educated at Sedbergh School.

He was on the 1950 British Lions tour to New Zealand and Australia.

He was also a businessman and High Sheriff of Greater London in 1979–80.
