= Bill McKay (rugby union) =

British Lions & Ireland international rugby union player

Dr. Bill McKay
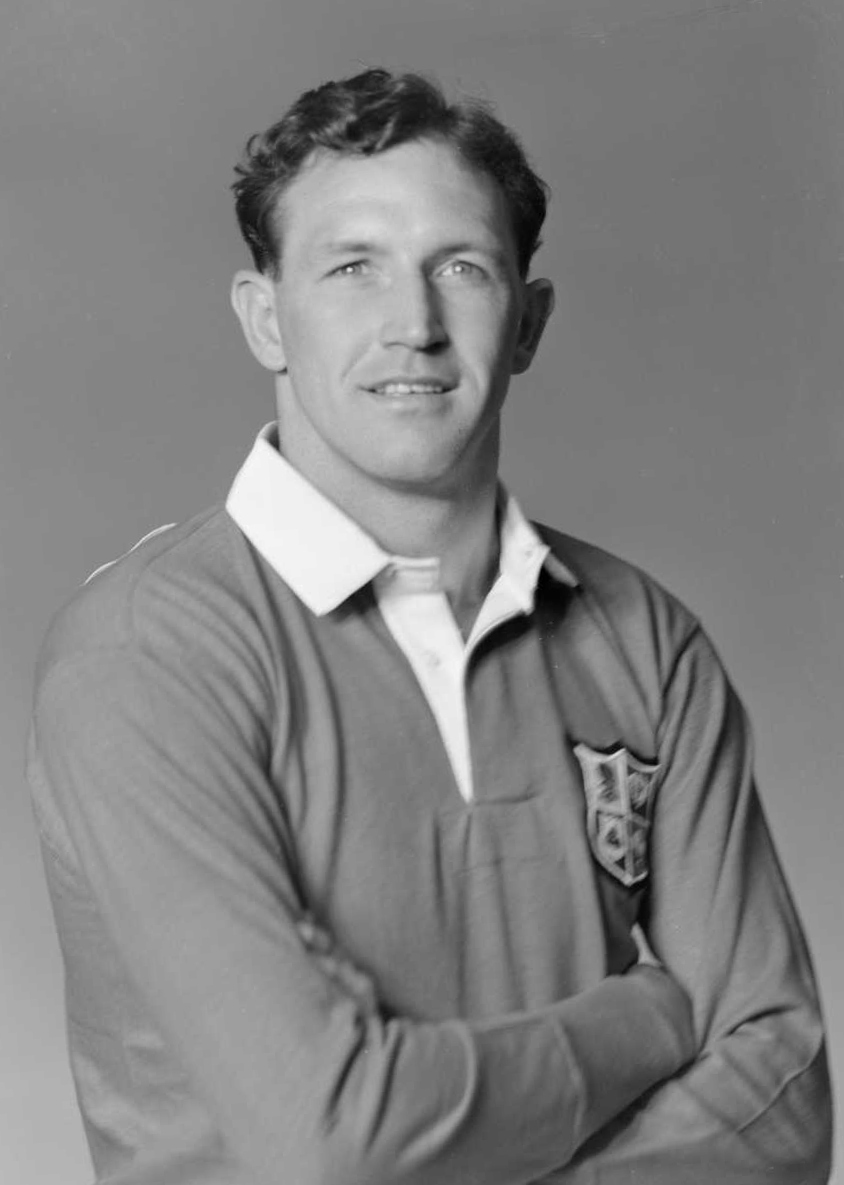
- McKay in New Zealand in 1950
- Born: James William McKay; 12 July 1921 Waterford, County Waterford, Ireland
- Died: 15 October 1997 (aged 76) Gisborne, New Zealand
- School: Coleraine Academy
- University: Queen's University Belfast
- Occupation: Doctor

Rugby union career
- Position: Flanker
Amateur team(s)
| Years | Team | Apps | (Points) |
- Queen's University RFC
International career
| Years | Team | Apps | (Points) |
| 1947–1952 | Ireland | 23 | (9) |
| 1950 | British Lions | 6 | (0) |

James William McKay (12 July 1921 – 15 October 1997) was an Irish rugby union player who played for Ireland, the British Lions and the Barbarians during the 1940s and 1950s.

== Early life ==
McKay served during the Second World War, including with the Chindits unit. He studied at Coleraine Academy and then the Queen's University, Belfast and played rugby for Queen's University RFC.

== Rugby career ==
McKay made his first appearance for Ireland opening match of the 1947 Five Nations Championship against France. He played in every one of Ireland's matches during the Championship, a feat which he repeated in Ireland's Grand Slam championship win in 1948 and their championship win and Triple Crown in 1949. He did likewise in 1950 and was selected for the British Lions team for their tour to New Zealand and Australia. McKay featured in all six Test matches during the tour, four against New Zealand and two against Australia. He also featured in nine other games during the tour against local opposition, scoring ten tries during the tour, the most of any forward. He again featured in all four of Ireland's matches during the 1951 Five Nations Championship, which saw Ireland win their third championship in four years. His final game for Ireland came against France in January 1952. In total, McKay won 23 caps for Ireland.

McKay twice played for Ulster against international opposition, against Australia in 1947 and South Africa in 1951. He also played three games for the Barbarians invitational team, against Cardiff RFC and Swansea RFC in 1948 and against East Midlands in 1951.

Following completion of his studies at Queen's University, Belfast, McKay qualified as a doctor and decided to emigrate to New Zealand.
