= Alan Henderson (rugby union) =

England international rugby union player

- Full name: Alan Peter Henderson
- Born: 26 May 1920 Dartford, England
- Died: 4 April 2003 (aged 82) North Yorkshire, England

Rugby union career
- Position: Hooker
International career
Years	Team	Apps	(Points)
1947–49	England	9	(3)

Alan Peter Henderson (26 May 1920 – 4 April 2003) was an English international rugby union player.

Born in Dartford, Kent, Henderson attended Taunton School and the University of Cambridge, gaining three blues. He was a specialist hooker. Other than varsity rugby, Henderson also played for Kent, Taunton and Richmond, as well as the Wanderers club in Edinburgh, where he was also a cricketer with Grange. From 1947 to 1949, Henderson was capped nine times as an England hooker, before losing his place to John Steeds.

== See also ==
- List of England national rugby union players
