= Queen's University RFC =

Irish rugby union club, based in Belfast

(Northern Ireland) Queen's University
- Full name: Queen's University Belfast Rugby Football Club
- Union: (Ireland) IRFU
- Branch: Ulster
- Founded: 1869; 157 years ago
- Region: Belfast
- Ground(s): Upper Malone; Belfast (Capacity: 1000)
- President: Ian McAvoy
- Coach(es): Derek Suffern, David Creighton, Ben Thompson (video)
- Captain: David Whitten
- League: All-Ireland Div. 1B
- 2024–25: 6th.
Team kit

Queen's University Belfast Rugby Football Club is the rugby union team of Queen's University Belfast, currently playing in Division 1B of the All-Ireland League. Founded in 1869, it is the most successful and oldest continuous rugby union club in Northern Ireland. They originally played as Queen's College, Belfast and have won the Ulster Senior Cup a record 23 times.

In 1993, when the AIB League was expanded to four divisions with forty-six senior clubs, five university clubs, including Queen's, joined the league. Queen's entered Division Four. Since then they played regularly in Division Three and Division Four.

In 2000, they were relegated to the Ulster Senior League but returned to the AIB League two years later.

Their senior team will play in Division 1 of the SONI Ulster Rugby Premiership.

== Notable players ==
See also Category:Queen's University R.F.C. players

=== Ireland ===
The following Queen's players have represented Ireland at full international level.

- James Allison
- Tommy Bowe
- Nigel Carr
- George Cromey
- Alexander Foster
- Noel Henderson
- David Hewitt
- Kenny Hooks
- David Humphreys
- David Irwin
- Jack Kyle
- Gary Longwell
- Bill McKay
- Rob Saunders
- Harry McKibbin
- Iain Henderson
- Paddy Mayne
- Henry O'Neill
- Cecil Pedlow
- Philip Rainey
- Harry Steele
- Robin Thompson
- William Tyrrell
- Roger Young

=== British & Irish Lions ===
The following Queen's players have also represented the British & Irish Lions.

- Alexander Foster: 1910
- William Tyrrell: 1910
- Henry O'Neill: 1930
- George Cromey: 1938
- Harry McKibbin: 1938
- Paddy Mayne: 1938
- Noel Henderson: 1950
- Jack Kyle: 1950
- Bill McKay: 1950
- Cecil Pedlow: 1955
- Robin Thompson: 1955
- David Hewitt: 1959, 1962
- Roger Young: 1966, 1968
- Richard Milliken: 1974
- David Irwin: 1983
- Trevor Ringland: 1983, 1986
- Nigel Carr: 1986
- Phillip Matthews: 1989
- Tommy Bowe: 2009, 2013

== Honours ==
- All-Ireland League
  - 1923-24, 1931–32, 1936–37
- Ulster Senior Cup: 24
  - 1885–86, 1886–87, 1889–90, 1890–91, 1891–92, 1899–1900, 1902–03, 1908–09, 1911–12, 1920–21, 1923–24, 1924–25, 1931–32, 1932–33, 1935–36, 1936–37, 1946–47, 1950–51, 1958–59, 1959–60, 1980–81, 2009–10, 2013–14, 2021–22
- Ulster Senior League: 17 (3 shared)
  - 1890–91, 1899–1900, 1911–12, 1919–20, 1921–22, 1922–23, 1923–24, 1946–47, 1947–48, 1948–49, 1949–50, 1952–53 (shared), 1953–54 (shared), 1956–57 (shared), 1963–64, 1966–67, 1979–80
- Ulster Junior Cup: 15
  - †1888-89, †1889-90, †1920-21, †1932-33, †1933-34, †1937-38, †1946-47, †1947-48, †1948-49, †1950-51, †1951-52, †1958-59, †1963-64, †1968-69, †1969–70
- Irish Universities Dudley Cup
  - Winners: 2013, 2015
- SONI Ulster Rugby Premiership Division 2
  - 2017–18

† Won by 2nd XV † Won by Freshers

== Teams ==
- 1st XV
- 2nd XV
- 3rd XV (Pirates)
- 4th XV (Raiders)
- Ladies 1st XV
