= Jimmy Nelson (rugby union, born 1921) =

Northern Irish rugby union player (1921–2014)

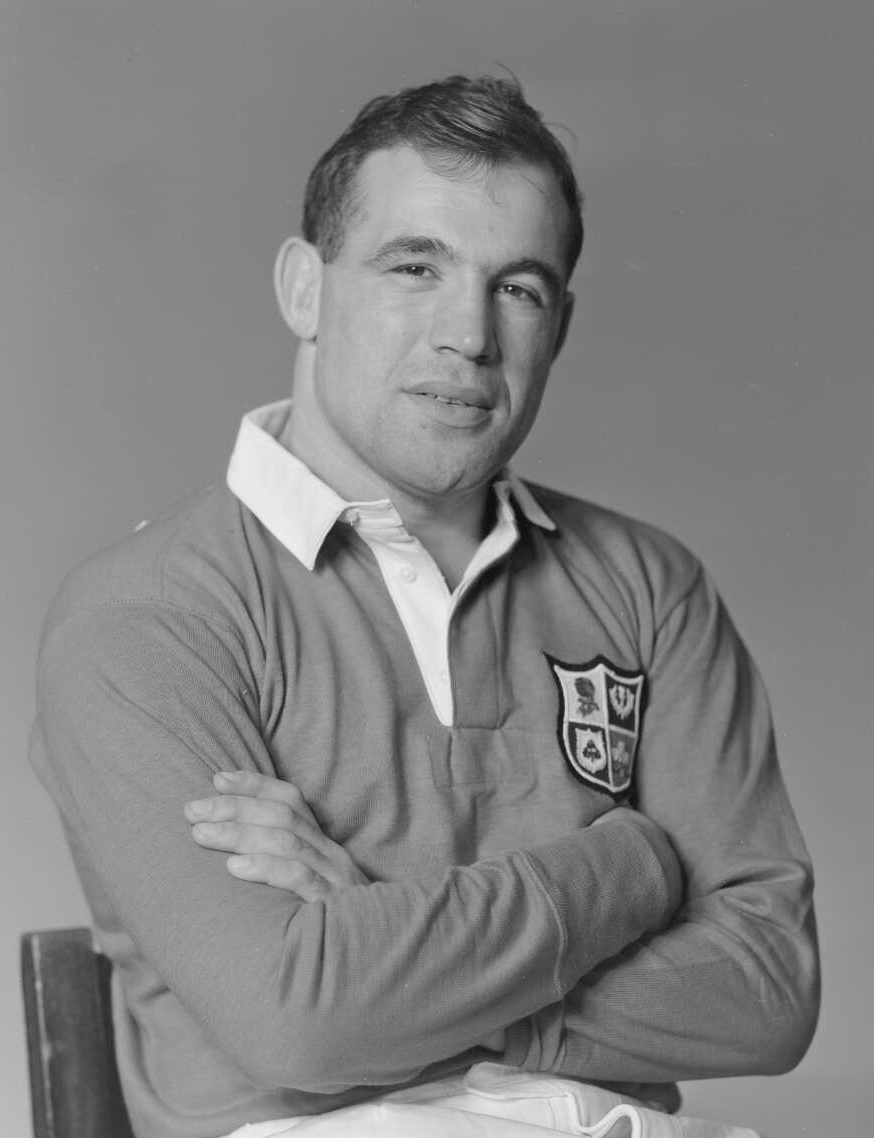
- Nelson in New Zealand in 1950
- Born: James Edward Nelson; 16 September 1921 Belfast
- Died: 13 June 2014 (aged 92) Lisburn, Northern Ireland

Rugby union career
- Position: Lock
Senior career
Years	Team	Apps	(Points)
- Malone RFC
International career
Years	Team	Apps	(Points)
1947–1954	Ireland	16	(9)
1950	British and Irish Lions	4	

James Edward Nelson OBE (16 September 1921 – 13 June 2014) was a rugby union international who represented Ireland from 1947 to 1954.

== Early life and career ==
James Edward Nelson was born on 16 September 1921 in Belfast. He became a qualified accountant

== Rugby union career ==
Nelson played his senior rugby for the Malone club. Nelson made his international debut on 6 December 1947 at Lansdowne Road in the Ireland vs Australia match and went on to play a further fifteen times for Ireland In 1950 he toured Australasia with the British Lions and he played in 19 games, including the four test matches. Of the twenty test matches he played for his national side and the Lions, he was on the winning side on eleven occasions. He played his final match for Ireland on 23 January 1954 at Colombes in the France vs Ireland match. He also played nine games for the Barbarians and captained the side against Cardiff in 1951 and also South Africa in 1952. He went on to serve on the Barbarians' committee from 1963 to 1967 and in 1982 was president of the IRFU.
