= John Daly (rugby) =

Ireland international rugby union & league footballer

Personal information
- Full name: John Christopher Daly
- Born: 12 December 1917 Cobh, Ireland
- Died: 10 October 1988 (aged 70) Chertsey, England

Playing information

Rugby union
- Position: Prop
Club
Years	Team	Pld	T	G	FG	P
	Cobh Pirates RFC
	Cork Constitution
	London Irish
	Total	0	0	0	0	0
Representative
Years	Team	Pld	T	G	FG	P
	Barbarian F.C.	≥1
	Munster Rugby	≥1
1947–48	Ireland	7	1	0	0	3

Rugby league
- Position: Prop
Club
Years	Team	Pld	T	G	FG	P
1948–51	Huddersfield	83	6	0		18
1951–53	Featherstone Rovers	46	1	0		3
	Total	129	7	0	0	21
Representative
Years	Team	Pld	T	G	FG	P
1949	British Empire XIII	1	0	0	0	0
1950–53	Other Nationalities	7	0	0	0	0

John Christopher Daly (12 December 1917 – 10 October 1988) was an Irish rugby union and professional rugby league footballer who played in the 1940s and 1950s. He played representative level rugby union (RU) for Ireland and Munster Rugby, at invitational level for Barbarian F.C., and at club level for Cobh Pirates RFC, Cork Constitution and London Irish, as a prop, and representative level rugby league (RL) for Other Nationalities and British Empire XIII, and at club level for Huddersfield and Featherstone Rovers, as a prop. When Jack Daly ran onto the playing field he used to do a double somersault, and before international matches he would do double back-somersaults to confirm his fitness.

== Background ==
John Daly was born in Cobh, County Cork, Ireland, he served as a signaller with the London Irish Rifles in North Africa, and Italy during World War II, he was involved in the Battle of Monte Cassino, and he died aged 70 in Chertsey, Surrey, England.

== Playing career ==
=== Club career ===
Daly changed rugby football codes from rugby union to rugby league when he transferred to Huddersfield during 1948. He played at prop in Huddersfield's 2–20 defeat by Wigan in the Championship Final during the 1949–50 season at Maine Road, Manchester on Saturday 13 May 1950.

Daly played at prop in Huddersfield's 4–11 defeat by Bradford Northern in the 1949–50 Yorkshire Cup Final during the 1949–50 season at Headingley, Leeds on Saturday 29 October 1949.

In September 1951, he transferred from Huddersfield to Featherstone Rovers, he played at prop in Featherstone Rovers' 12–18 defeat by Workington Town in the 1951–52 Challenge Cup Final during the 1951–52 season at Wembley Stadium, London on Saturday 19 April 1952, in front of a crowd of 72,093.

=== Representative honours ===
Daly won caps in rugby union for Ireland in 1947 against France, England, Scotland, and Wales, and in 1948 against England, Scotland, and Wales.

In rugby league, he represented British Empire XIII in 1949 against France, and won caps for Other Nationalities (RL) in 1950 against France (2 matches), in 1951 against Wales, and England, in 1952 against England, and France, and in 1953 against Wales.

== Honoured by Rugby League Ireland ==
On 25 March 2004 footballer were inducted into Rugby League Ireland's inaugural Hall of Fame at the Rugby League Heritage Centre in Huddersfield, they were; John "Jack" Daly (Huddersfield/Featherstone Rovers), Robert "Bob" Kelly (Keighley/Wakefield Trinity/Batley), Seamus McCallion (Halifax/Leeds/Bramley), Thomas "Tom" McKinney, (Salford/Warrington/St. Helens), Terry O'Connor (Salford/Wigan Warriors/Widnes Vikings), Patrick "Paddy" Reid (Huddersfield/Halifax).
