= John Robins (rugby union) =

British Lions & Wales international rugby union player

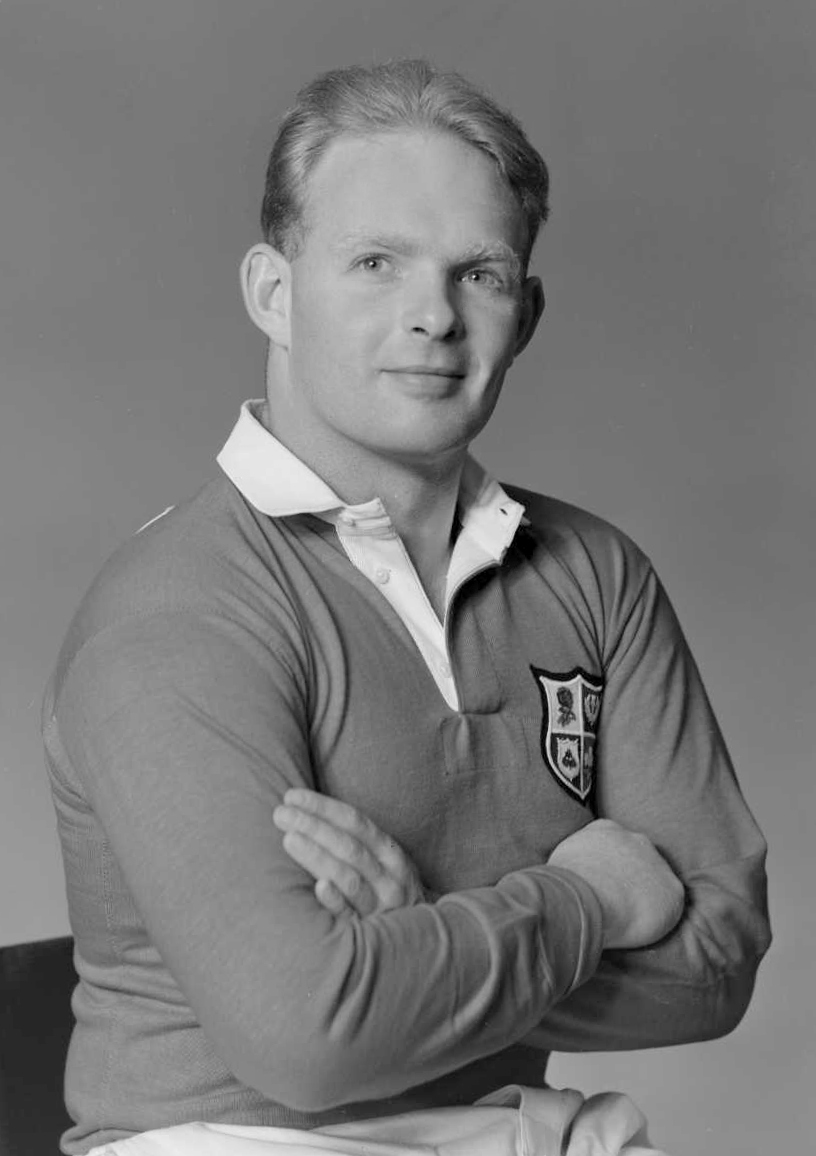
- Robins in New Zealand in 1950
- Born: John Denning Robins; 17 May 1926 Cardiff
- Died: 21 February 2007 (aged 80) Cardiff
- School: Llandaff Cathedral School; Wellington School
- University: Loughborough University

Rugby union career
- Position: Prop
Senior career
Years	Team	Apps	(Points)
- Coventry
–	Bradford		
–	Sale		
–	Birkenhead Park		
–	Leicester Tigers		
–	Barbarians		
International career
Years	Team	Apps	(Points)
1950–1953	Wales	11	(Pts:0)
1950	British Lions	5	(10)

John Denning Robins (17 May 1926 – 21 February 2007) was a Welsh international rugby union player who attained 11 caps for Wales between 1950 and 1953. A prop, he toured New Zealand and Australia with the British and Irish Lions in 1950 and became the first Lions coach, on the 1966 British Lions tour to Australia and New Zealand.

Robins was born in Cardiff. He was educated at Llandaff Cathedral School and Wellington School. He joined the Royal Navy and served in World War II. He played for England in two wartime Services Internationals. He trained as a teacher at Loughborough and returned there as a lecturer before taking up the post of Director of Physical Education and Recreation at Sheffield University and subsequently the same position at University College, Cardiff.

Robins played for Leicester Tigers and was a noted goal-kicker despite being a prop.
