= Guy Basquet =

France international rugby union player (1921–2006)

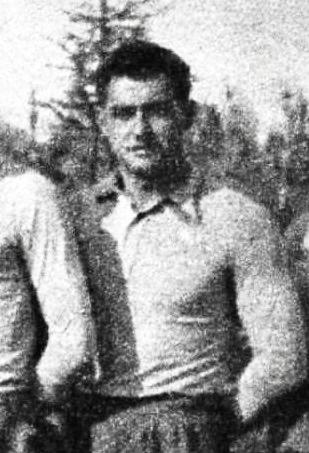
Guy Basquet while playing for SU Agen, in 1943

Guy Basquet was a French rugby union player, born 13 July 1921 in Layrac and died 1 February 2006 in Agen. He was known for scoring a try in his country's first wins on Welsh and English soil in 1948 and 1951, two against Australia in the first French win over a Dominions team in 1948 and another on their first triumph at Murrayfield over Scotland in 1952.

== Biography ==
He was 1 m 81 and weighed 102 kg, he played third line centre and left flank for Agen.

He started out as a basketball player, but rapidly succeeded in the Juniors of Racing Metro, and moved to Agen during the Second World War, (around 1940), the town where he would stay for the rest of his career, until 1953. During the championship final of 1947, he was temporarily sent off during the second half of the first period, a rule which was not rescinded for a further two decades.

He played at Agen alongside Albert Ferrasse, then followed him as head of the FFR, and of the club. He became, in effect, vice-president of the Fédération from 1968 to 1991, the date that Bernard Lapasset became head of the FFR, and ultimately head of the selection committee from 1980, succeeding Élie Pebeyre.

He was also president of the French Barbarians, and of Agen from 1985 until the arrival of Daniel Dubroca. His comments were collected into the book by Roger Driès: Un missionnaire du rugby au cœur de tous les défis, éd. CMCP in 2001.

== Honours ==
=== Club ===
- French Champions : 1945, 1947
  - Finalist: 1943
- Winner of the Coupe de France : 1943, 1945

=== International ===
- 33 caps for France A from 1945 to 1952 (including 24 as captain from 1948 à 1952), therefore part of the 1st team to win in Swansea in 1948, and at Twinckenham in 1951
- 1st tournament in Argentina in 1949
  (and director of the tour of New Zealand in 1961)
