= Karl Mullen =

Irish rugby union player

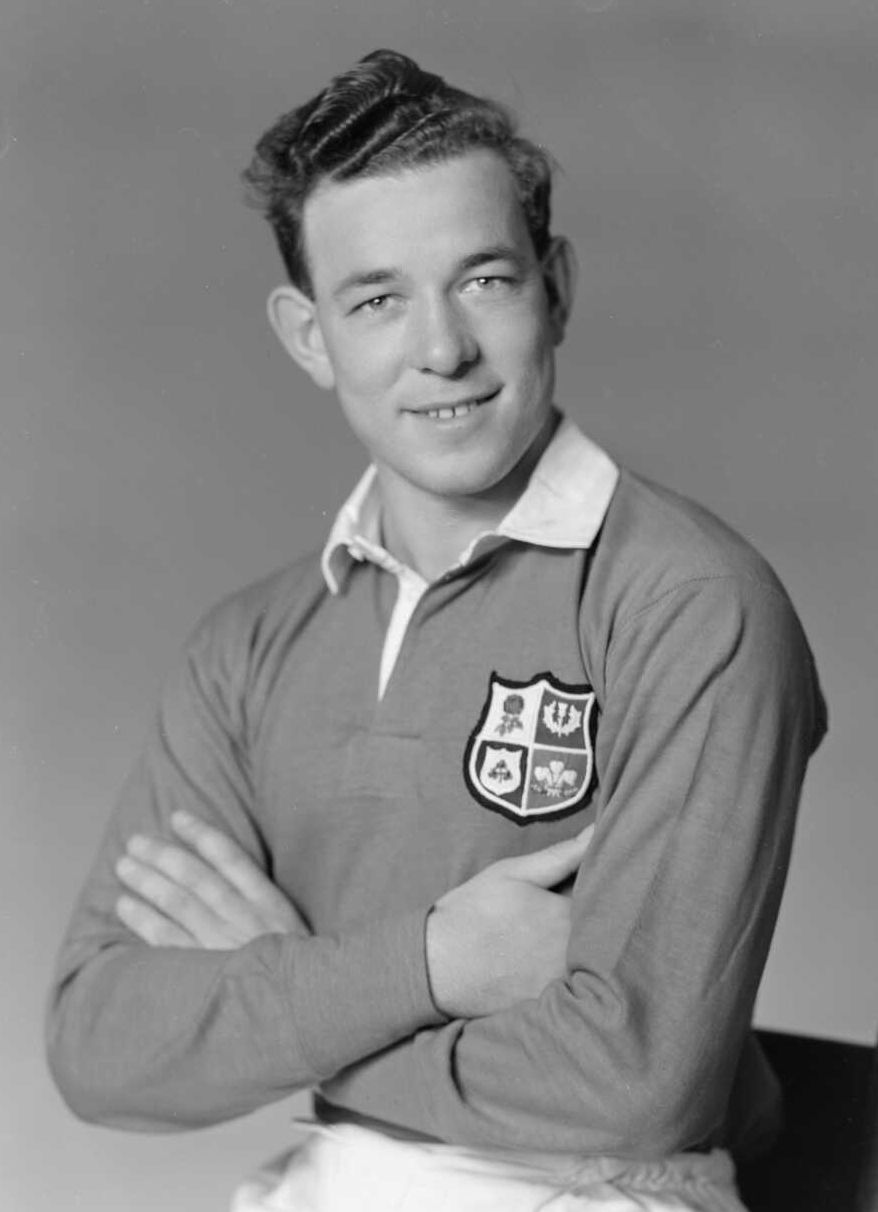
- Mullen in New Zealand in 1950
- Born: Karl Daniel Mullen; 26 November 1926
- Died: 26 April 2009 (aged 82)
- University: Belvedere College; Royal College of Surgeons in Ireland
- Occupation: Gynaecologist

Rugby union career
- Position: Hooker
Amateur team(s)
| Years | Team | Apps | (Points) |
- Old Belvedere
International career
| Years | Team | Apps | (Points) |
| 1947–1952 | Ireland | 25 | |
| 1950 | British Lions | 4 | |

Dr Karl Daniel Mullen (26 November 1926 – 27 April 2009) was an Irish rugby union player and consultant gynaecologist who captained the Irish rugby team and captained the British Lions on their 1950 tour to Australia and New Zealand.

Mullen was born in Courtown Harbour, County Wexford and educated at Belvedere College and the Royal College of Surgeons in Ireland. He played as hooker, winning 25 caps for Ireland from 1947 to 1952. He captained the Irish team to their first Grand Slam in the 1948 Five Nations Championship and was one of eight players from that team who lived to see the country's next Grand Slam in 2009.

He was also selected to captain the 1950 Lions Tour to Australia and New Zealand, during which the Lions lost the Test series against the All Blacks 3-0, with one game drawn, but won the test series against Australia 2-0. He played four tests for the Lions on that tour; two against New Zealand and two against Australia. He missed the third and fourth tests against New Zealand through injury.
