= 1949 Five Nations Championship =

Rugby union competition

- Date: 15 January - 26 March 1949
- Countries: England; Ireland; France; Scotland; Wales

Tournament statistics
- Champions: Ireland (6th title)
- Triple Crown: Ireland (4th title)
- Matches played: 10

The 1949 Five Nations Championship was the twentieth series of the rugby union Five Nations Championship. Including the previous incarnations as the Home Nations and Five Nations, this was the fifty-fifth series of the northern hemisphere rugby union championship. Ten matches were played between 15 January and 26 March. It was contested by England, France, Ireland, Scotland and Wales. Ireland won their 6th title and the Triple Crown.

== Participants ==
The teams involved were:

Nation	Venue	City	Captain
England	Twickenham	London	Nim Hall/Ivor Preece
France	Stade Olympique Yves-du-Manoir	Colombes	Guy Basquet
Ireland	Lansdowne Road/Ravenhill	Dublin/Belfast	Karl Mullen
Scotland	Murrayfield	Edinburgh	Doug Keller
Wales	National Stadium/St. Helens	Cardiff/Swansea	Haydn Tanner

== Table ==
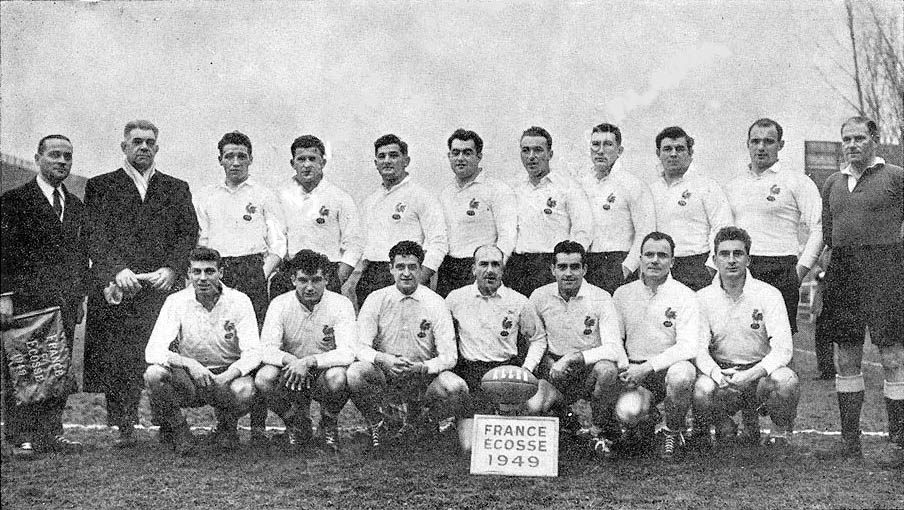
Team of France that opened the season vs Scotland in Paris

Pos	Team	Pld	W	D	L	PF	PA	PD	Pts
1	Ireland	4	3	0	1	41	24	+17	6
2	England	4	2	0	2	35	29	+6	4
2	France	4	2	0	2	24	28	−4	4
2	Scotland	4	2	0	2	20	37	−17	4
5	Wales	4	1	0	3	17	19	−2	2

== Results ==
1949-01-15

France	0–8	Scotland

Paris

1949-01-15

Wales	9–3	England

Cardiff

1949-01-29

Ireland	9–16	France

Dublin

1949-02-05

Scotland	6–5	Wales

Edinburgh

1949-02-12

Ireland	14–5	England

Dublin

1949-02-26

England	8–3	France

Twickenham

1949-02-26

Scotland	3–13	Ireland

Edinburgh

1949-03-12

Wales	0–5	Ireland

Swansea

1949-03-19

England	19–3	Scotland

Twickenham

1949-03-26

France	5–3	Wales

Paris
