= Stadium =

Venue for sports, concerts, or other events

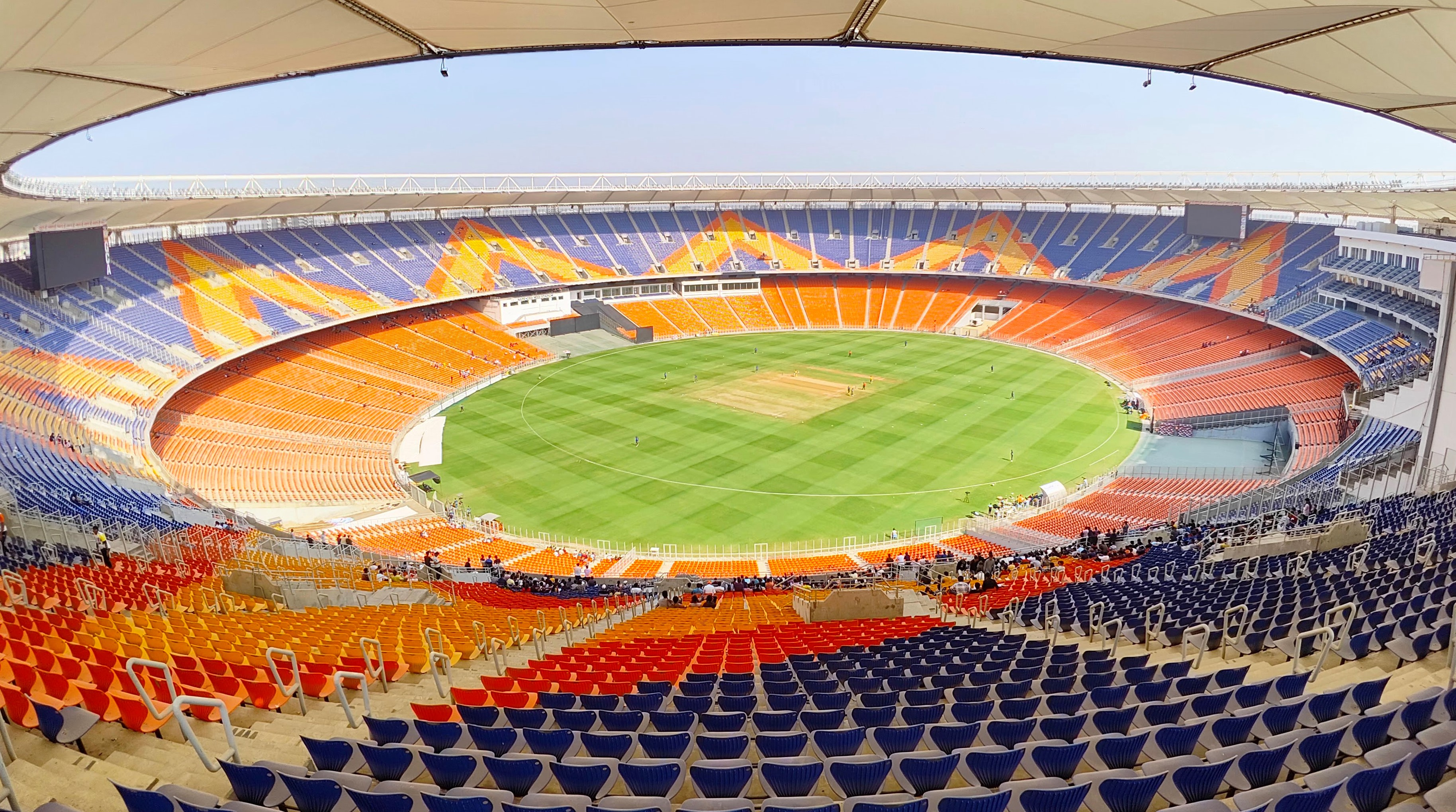
Narendra Modi Stadium, the current largest stadium by capacity, is designed to allow up to 132,000 people to spectate a cricket match.

A stadium (pl.: stadiums or stadia) is a place or venue for (mostly) outdoor sports, concerts, or other events and consists of a field or stage completely or partially surrounded by a tiered structure designed to allow spectators to stand or sit and view the event. Pausanias noted that for about half a century the only event at the ancient Greek Olympic festival was the race that comprised one length of the stadion at Olympia, where the word "stadium" originated. Most of the stadiums with a capacity of at least 10,000 are used for association football. Other popular stadium sports include gridiron football, baseball, cricket, the various codes of rugby, field lacrosse, bandy, and bullfighting. Many large sports venues are also used for concerts. Many modern designs are increasingly incorporating sustainability features such as energy efficiency and proper waste management systems.

== Etymology ==
"Stadium" is the Latin form of the Greek word "stadion" (στάδιον), a measure of length equalling the length of 600 human feet. As feet are of variable length the exact length of a stadion depends on the exact length adopted for 1 foot at a given place and time. Although in modern terms 1 stadion = 600 ft (180 m), in a given historical context it may actually signify a length up to 15% larger or smaller. The equivalent Roman measure, the stadium, had a similar length – about 185 m (607 ft) – but instead of being defined in feet was defined using the Roman standard passus to be a distance of 125 passūs (double-paces). The English use of stadium comes from the tiered infrastructure surrounding a Roman track of such length. Most dictionaries provide for both stadiums and stadia as valid English plurals.

== History ==
The oldest known stadium was probably built by the Indus Valley Civilization in ~2000BC at Dholavira and Juni Kuran.

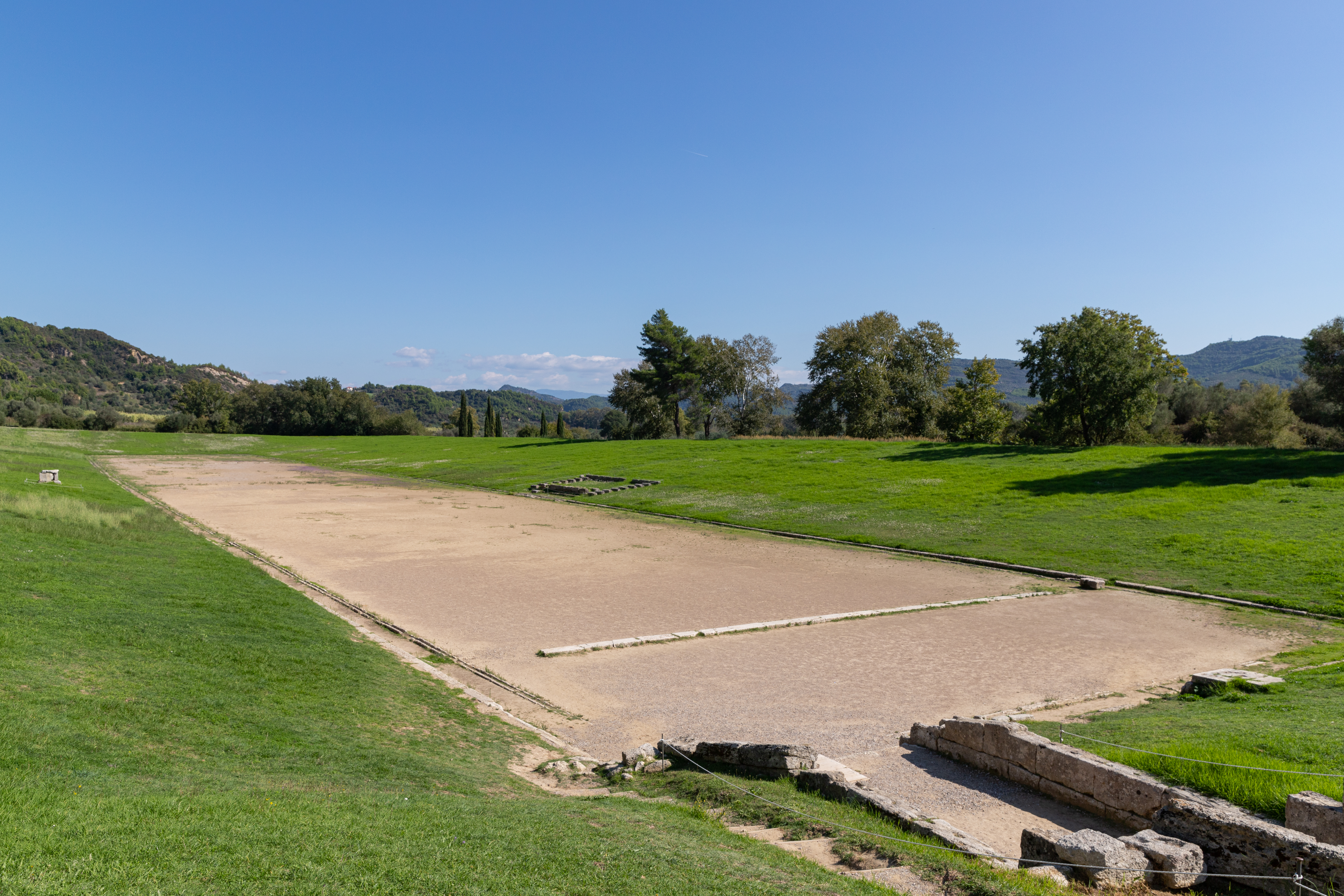
Stadium at Olympia were built ~776 BC

A historically significant stadium is the Stadium at Olympia in Greece, where the ancient Olympic Games were held from 776 BC. Initially the Games consisted of a single event, a sprint along the length of the stadium. Greek and Roman stadiums have been found in numerous ancient cities, perhaps the most famous being the Stadium of Domitian, in Rome. The excavated and refurbished ancient Panathenaic Stadium hosted attempted revivals of the Olympic Games in 1870 and 1875 before hosting the first modern Olympics in 1896, the 1906 Intercalated Games, and some events of the 2004 Summer Olympics. The excavation and refurbishment of the stadium was part of the legacy of the Greek national benefactor Evangelos Zappas, and it was the first ancient stadium to be used in modern times.

=== Antiquity ===
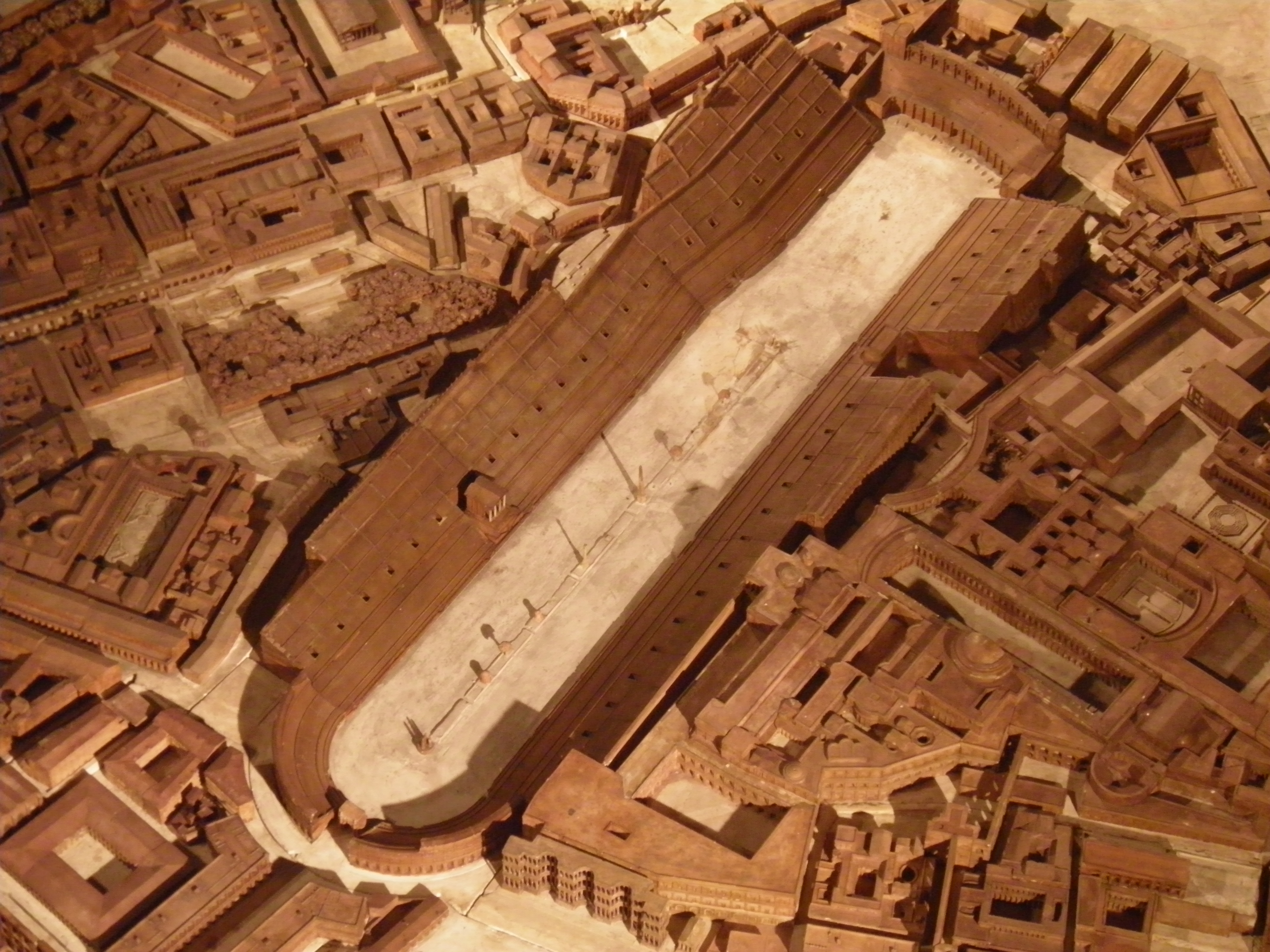
The Circus Maximus (model pictured) was one of many circuses built in Ancient Rome.

Stadiums in ancient Greece and Rome were built for different purposes, and at first only the Greeks built structures called "stadium"; Romans built structures called "circus". Greek stadia were for foot races, whereas the Roman circus was for horse races. Both had similar shapes and bowl-like areas around them for spectators. The Greeks also developed the theatre, with its seating arrangements foreshadowing those of modern stadiums. The Romans copied the theatre, then expanded it to accommodate larger crowds and more elaborate settings. The Romans also developed the double-sized round theatre called amphitheatre, seating crowds in the tens of thousands for gladiatorial combats and beast shows. The Greek stadium and theatre and the Roman circus and amphitheatre are all ancestral to the modern stadium.

Examples of stadiums from antiquity
Name	Country	Earliest date	Track length	Track width
Stadium at Olympia	Greece	776 BC	212.54 m (697.3 ft)	28.5 m (94 ft)
Stadium at Delphi	Greece	500 BC	177 m (581 ft)	25.5 m (84 ft)
Stadium of Domitian	Italy	80 AD	200 m (660 ft)-250 m (820 ft) (estimated)	
Stadium of Philippopolis	Bulgaria	2nd century AD (117–138 AD)	250 m (820 ft)	32 m (105 ft)
Stadium at Aphrodisias	Turkey	1st century B.C.	225 m (738 ft) (approx.)	30 m (98 ft) (approx.)

=== Modernity ===
The first stadiums built in the modern era were basic facilities, designed for the single purpose of fitting as many spectators in as possible. With tremendous growth in the popularity of organized sport in the late Victorian era, especially association football in the United Kingdom and baseball in the United States, the first such structures were built. One such early stadium was the Lansdowne Road Stadium, the brainchild of Henry Dunlop, who organized the first All Ireland Athletics Championships. Banned from locating sporting events at Trinity College, Dunlop built the stadium in 1872. "I laid down a cinder running path of a quarter-mile, laid down the present Lansdowne Tennis Club ground with my own theodolite, started a Lansdowne archery club, a Lansdowne cricket club, and last, but not least, the Lansdowne Rugby Football Club – colours red, black and yellow." Some 300 cartloads of soil from a trench beneath the railway were used to raise the ground, allowing Dunlop to use his engineering expertise to create a pitch envied around Ireland.

Other early stadiums from this period in the UK include the Stamford Bridge stadium (opened in 1877 for the London Athletic Club) and Anfield stadium (1884 as a venue for Everton F.C.).

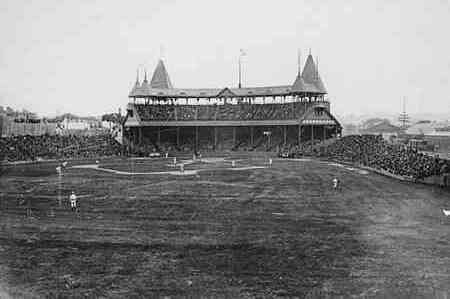
The South End Grounds (pictured in 1893) was one of the first-generation "wooden ballparks".

In the U.S., many professional baseball teams built large stadiums mainly out of wood, with the first such venue being the South End Grounds in Boston, opened in 1871 for the team then known as the Boston Beaneaters (now the Atlanta Braves). Many of these parks caught fire, and those that did not proved inadequate for a growing game. All of the 19th-century wooden parks were replaced, some after a few years, and none survive today.

Goodison Park was the first purpose-built association football stadium in the world. Walton-based building firm Kelly brothers were instructed to erect two uncovered stands that could each accommodate 4,000 spectators. A third covered stand accommodating 3,000 spectators was also requested. Everton officials were impressed with the builder's workmanship and agreed two further contracts: exterior hoardings were constructed at a cost of £150 and 12 turnstiles were installed at a cost of £7 each. The stadium was officially opened on 24 August 1892 by Lord Kinnaird and Frederick Wall of the Football Association. No football was played; instead the 12,000 crowd watched a short track and field event followed by music and a fireworks display. Upon its completion the stadium was the first joint purpose-built football stadium in the world.

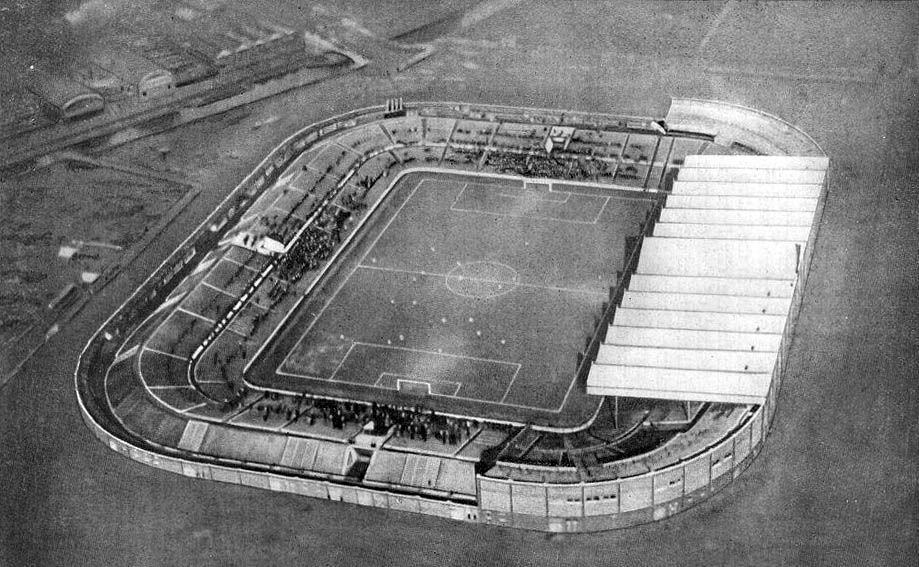
Archibald Leitch designed numerous football stadiums in early twentieth-century England, such as Old Trafford (pictured in the 1920s).

The architect Archibald Leitch brought his experience with the construction of industrial buildings to bear on the design of functional stadiums up and down the country. His work encompassed the first 40 years of the 20th century. One of his most notable designs was Old Trafford in Manchester. The ground was originally designed with a capacity of 100,000 spectators and featured seating in the south stand under cover, while the remaining three stands were left as terraces and uncovered. It was the first stadium to feature continuous seating along the contours of the stadium.

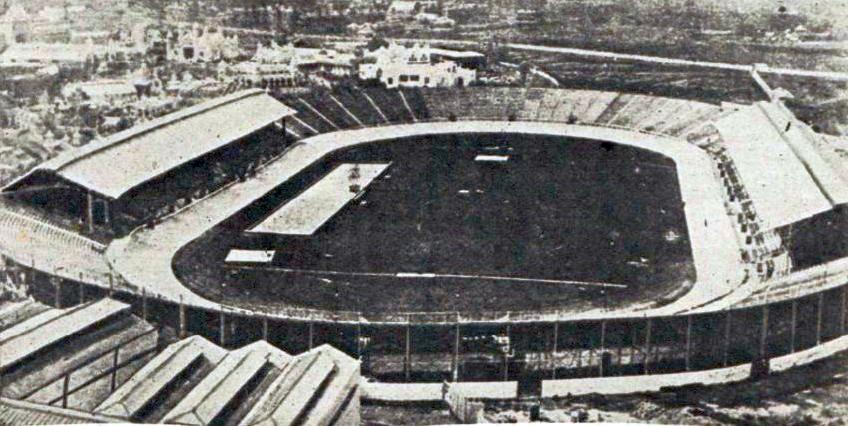
White City Stadium is often cited as the first "modern seater" stadium.

These early venues, originally designed to host football matches, were adopted for use by the Olympic Games, the first one being held in 1896 in Athens, Greece. The White City Stadium, built for the 1908 Summer Olympics in London is often cited as the first modern seater stadium, at least in the UK. Designed by the engineer J.J. Webster and completed in 10 months by George Wimpey, on the site of the Franco-British Exhibition, this stadium with a seating capacity of 68,000 was opened by King Edward VII on 27 April 1908. Upon completion, the stadium had a running track 24 ft wide (7.3 m) and three laps to the mile (536 m); outside there was a 35-foot-wide (11 m), 660-yard (600 m) cycle track. The infield included a swimming and diving pool. The London Highbury Stadium, built in 1913, was the first stadium in the UK to feature a two-tiered seating arrangement when it was redesigned in the Art Deco style in 1936.

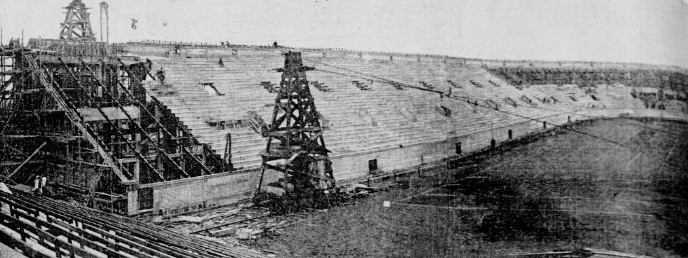
The construction of Harvard Stadium in 1903 pioneered the use of concrete and steel frames.

During these decades, parallel stadium developments were taking place in the U.S. The Baker Bowl, a baseball park in Philadelphia that opened in its original form in 1887 but was completely rebuilt in 1895, broke new ground in stadium construction in two major ways. The stadium's second incarnation featured the world's first cantilevered second deck (tier) in a sports venue, and was the first baseball park to use steel and brick for the majority of its construction. Another influential venue was Boston's Harvard Stadium, built in 1903 by Harvard University for its American football team and track and field program. It was the world's first stadium to use concrete-and-steel construction. In 1909, concrete-and-steel construction came to baseball with the opening of Shibe Park in Philadelphia and, a few months later, Forbes Field in Pittsburgh. The latter was the world's first three-tiered sporting venue. The opening of these parks marked the start of the "jewel box" era of park construction. The largest stadium crowd ever was 199,854 people watching the final match of the 1950 World Cup at Rio de Janeiro's Maracanã on 16 July 1950.

Stadia through the ages

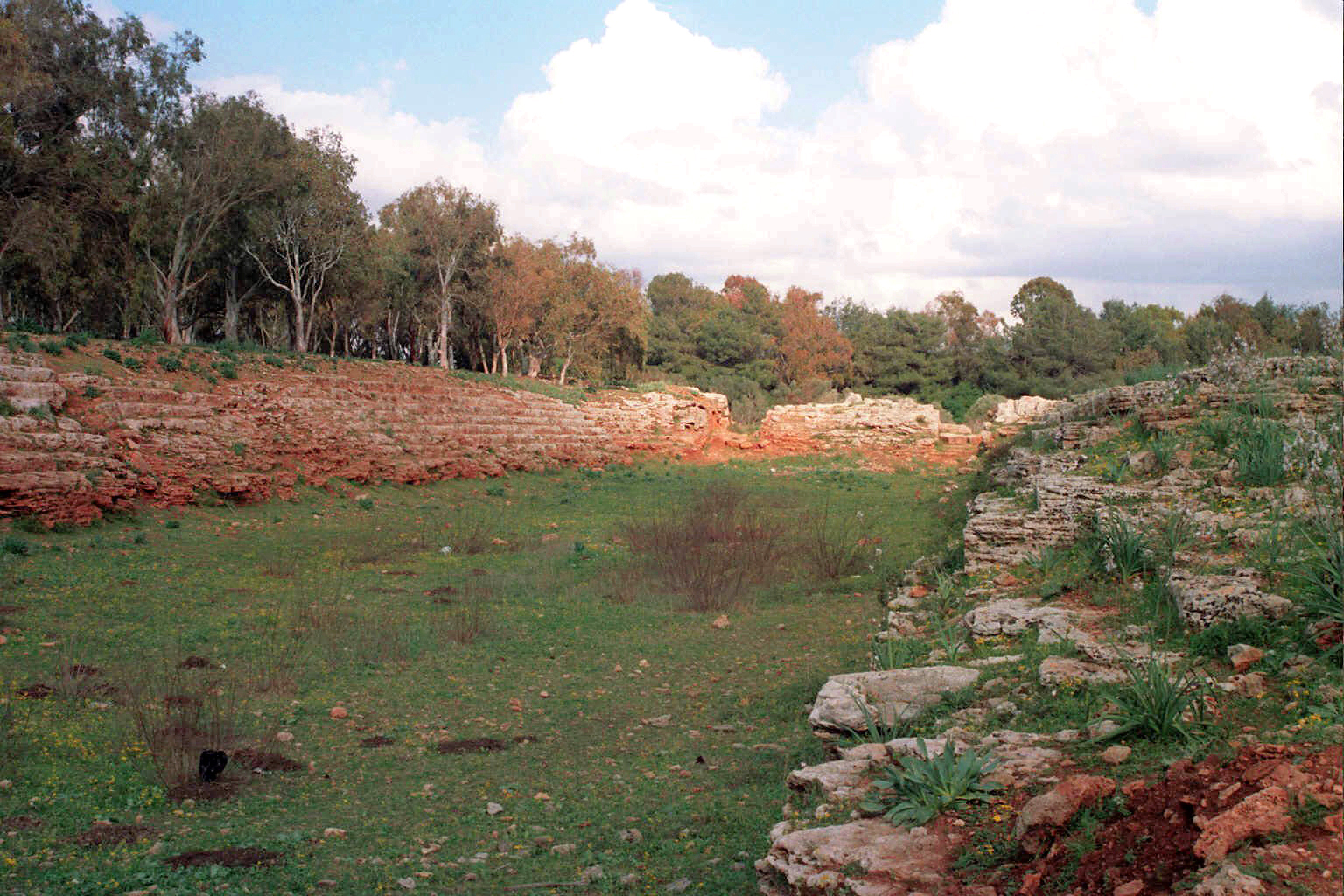
Phoenician Stadium north of Amrit, Syria

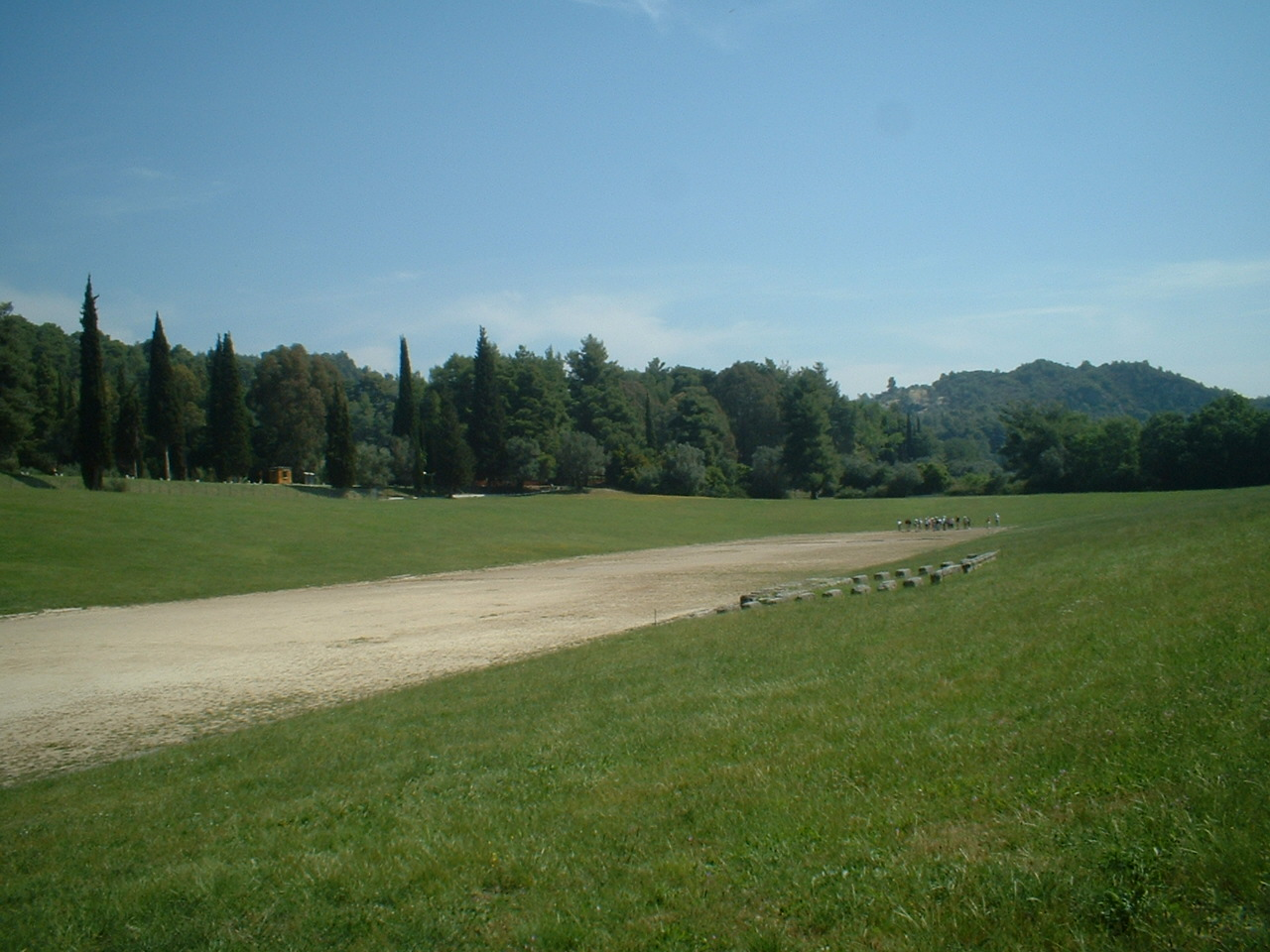
The Olympia stadium

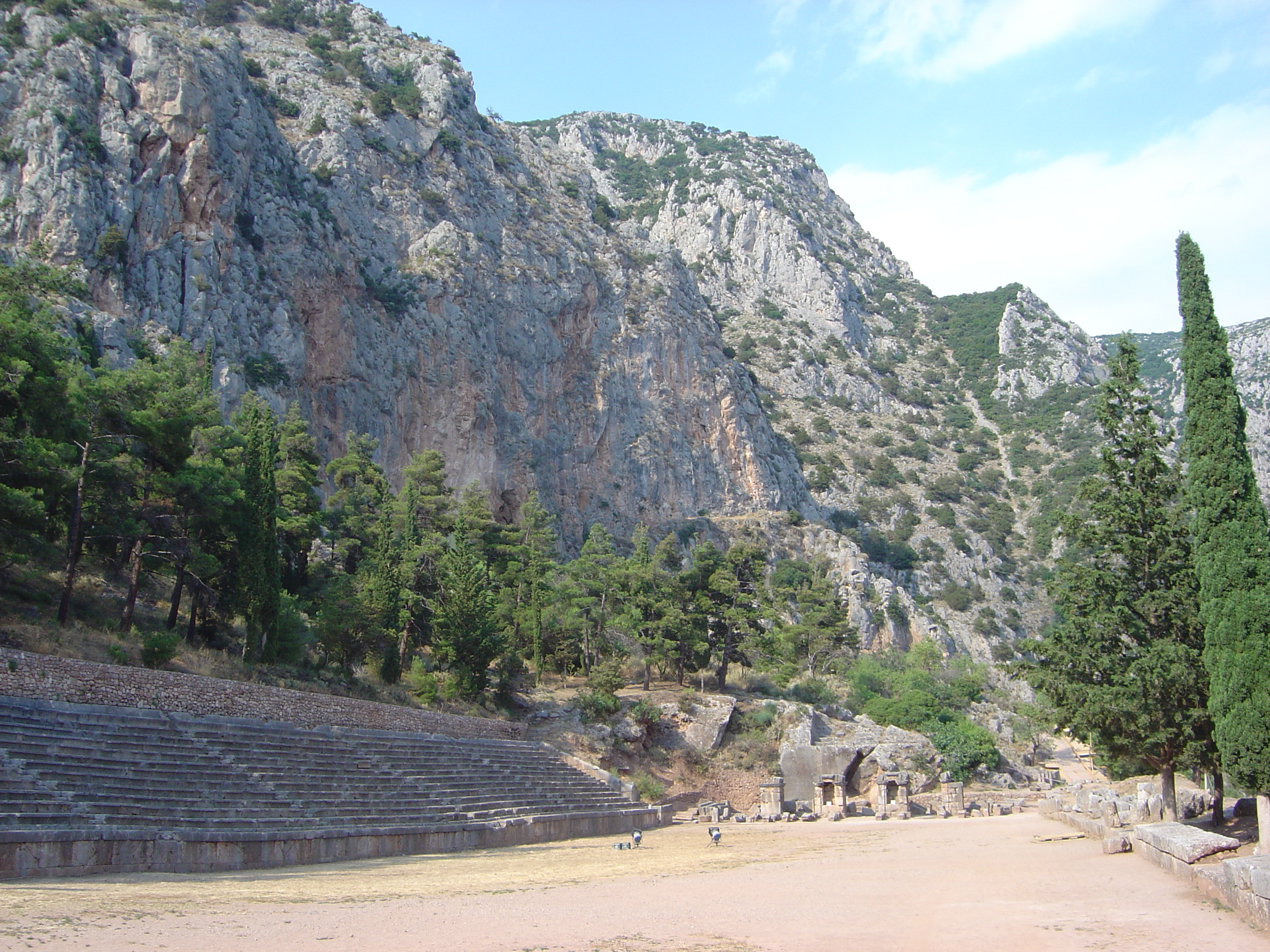
Stadium at the sanctuary of Apollo in Delphi, Greece

The Colosseum in Rome, Italy

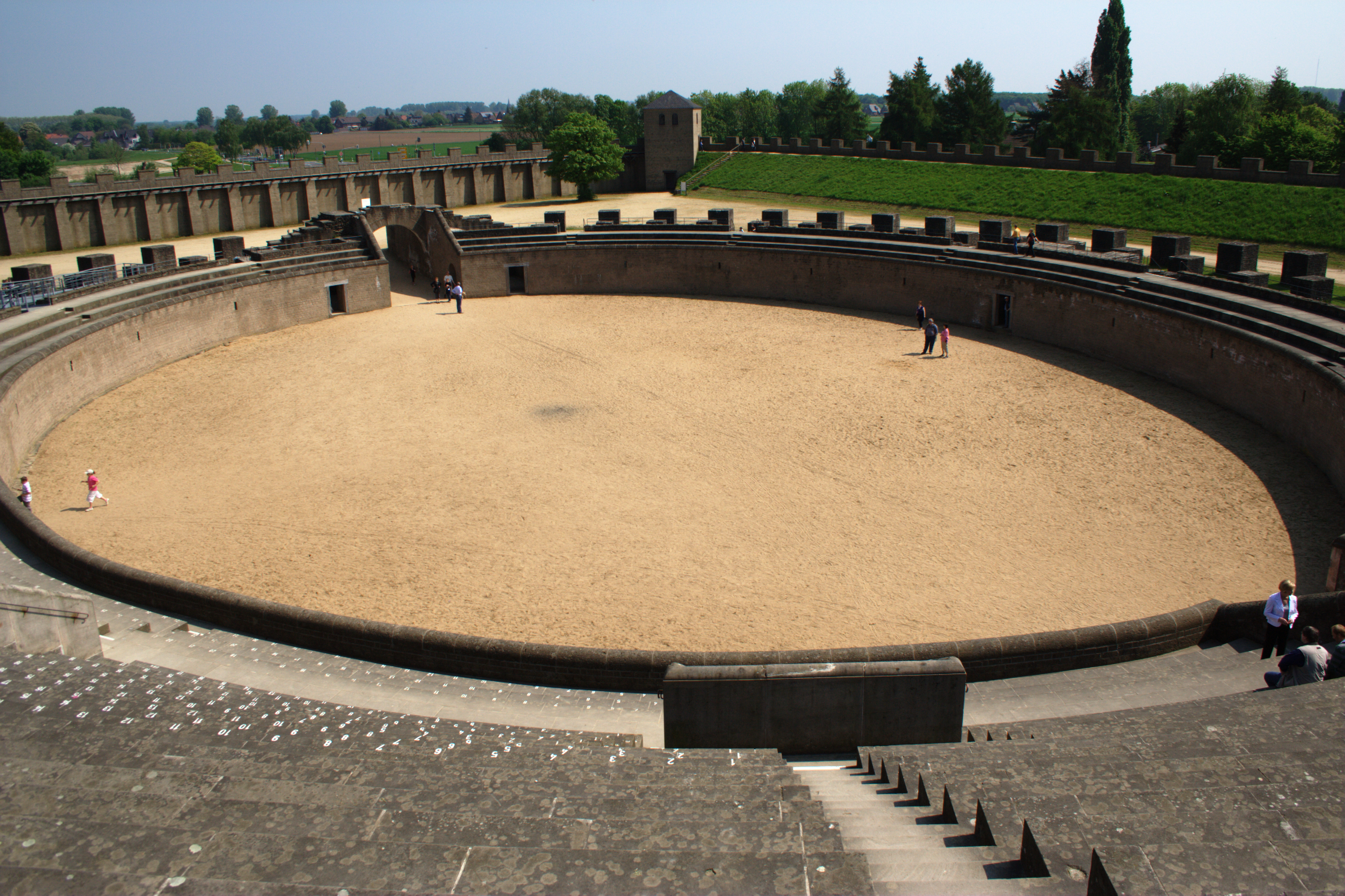
Reconstructed Roman amphitheatre in Xanten, Germany

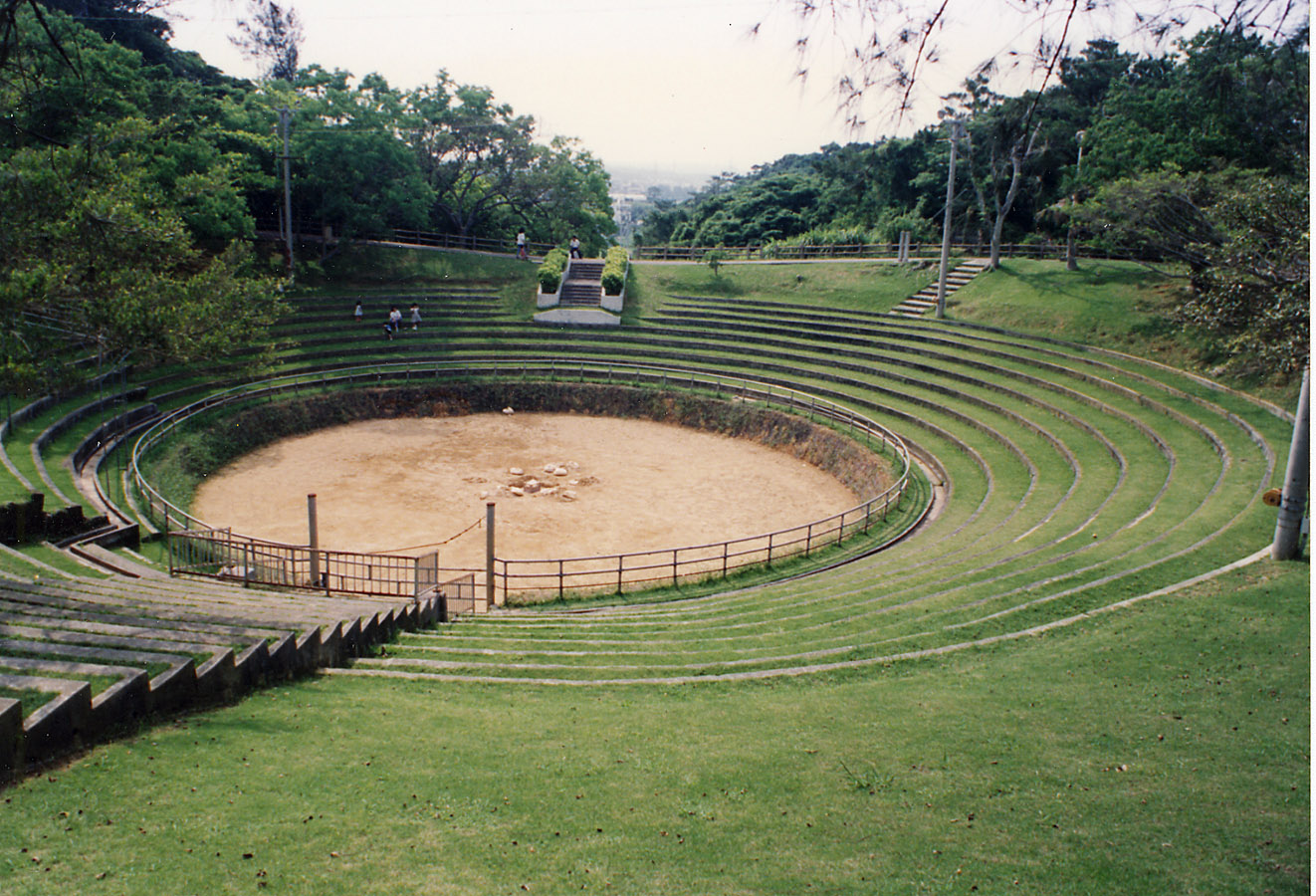
Tōgyū arena in Okinawa, Japan

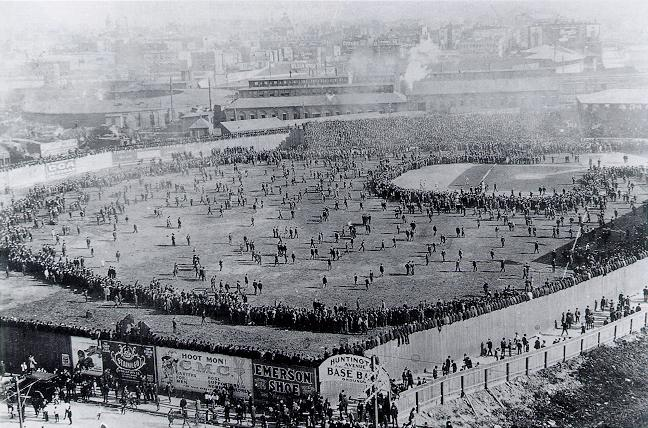
The Huntington Avenue Grounds during the 1903 World Series, United States

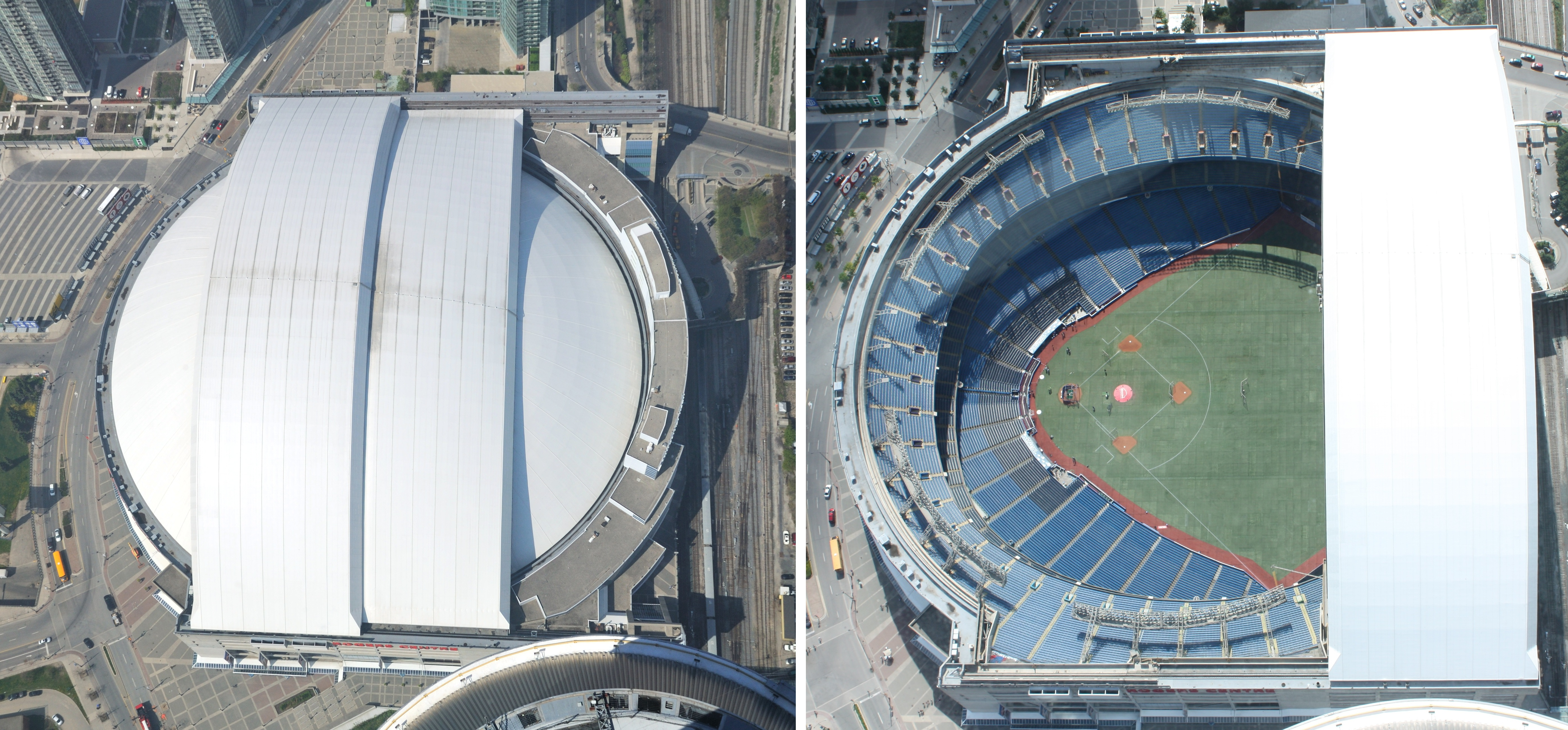
Rogers Centre, the first functional retractable-roof stadium, Canada

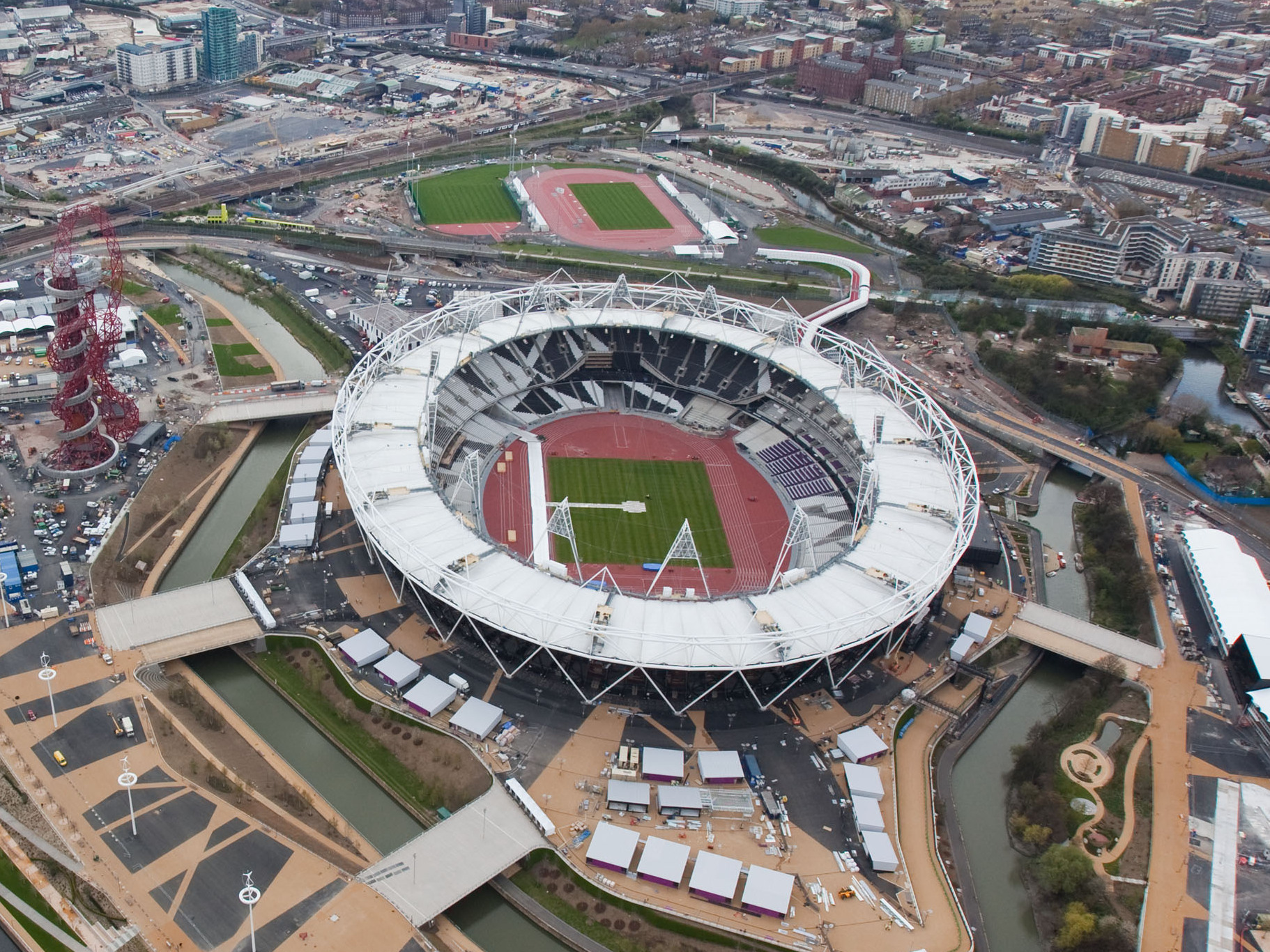
London Olympic Stadium, United Kingdom

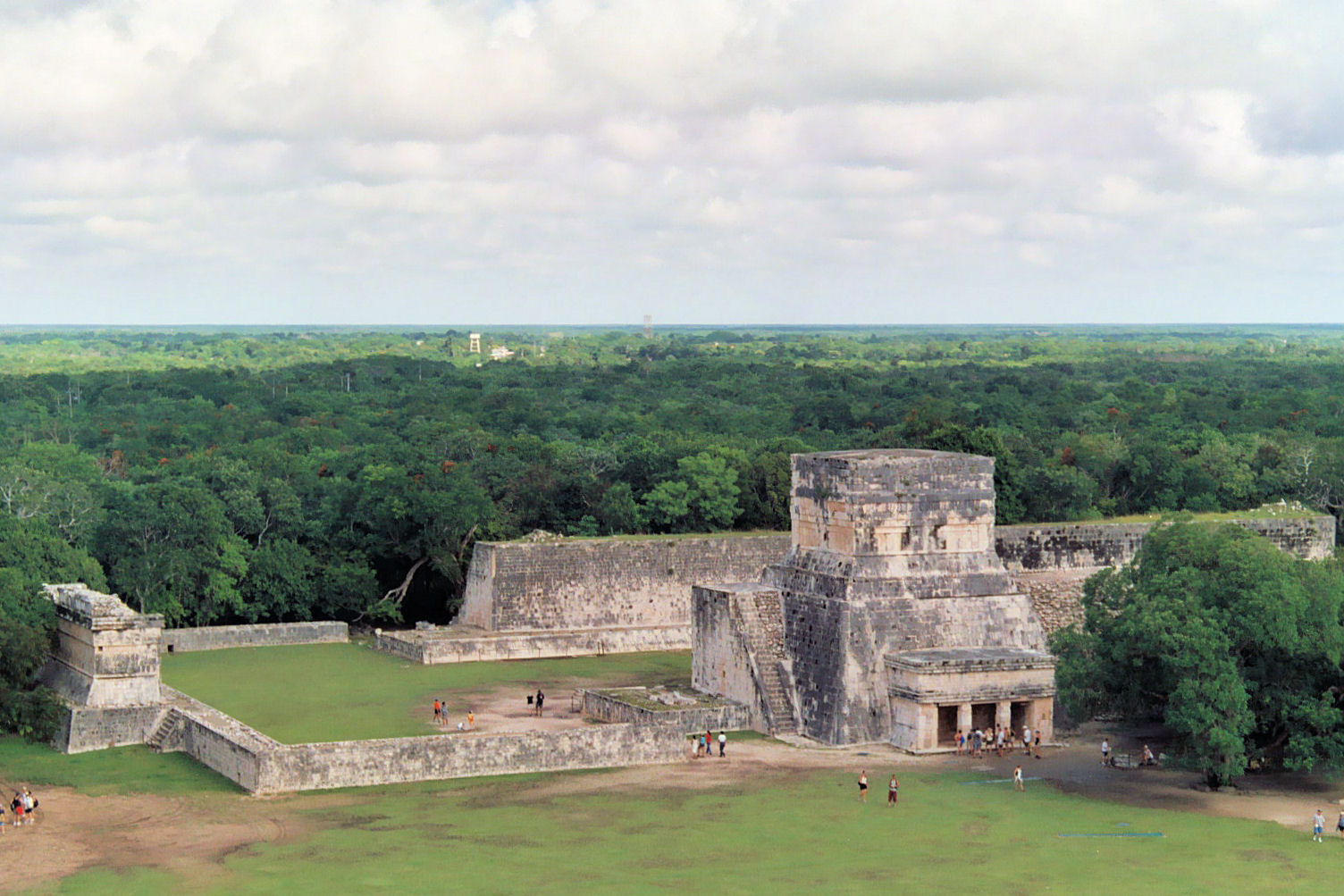
The Grand Ballcourt of Chichen Itza

== Types ==
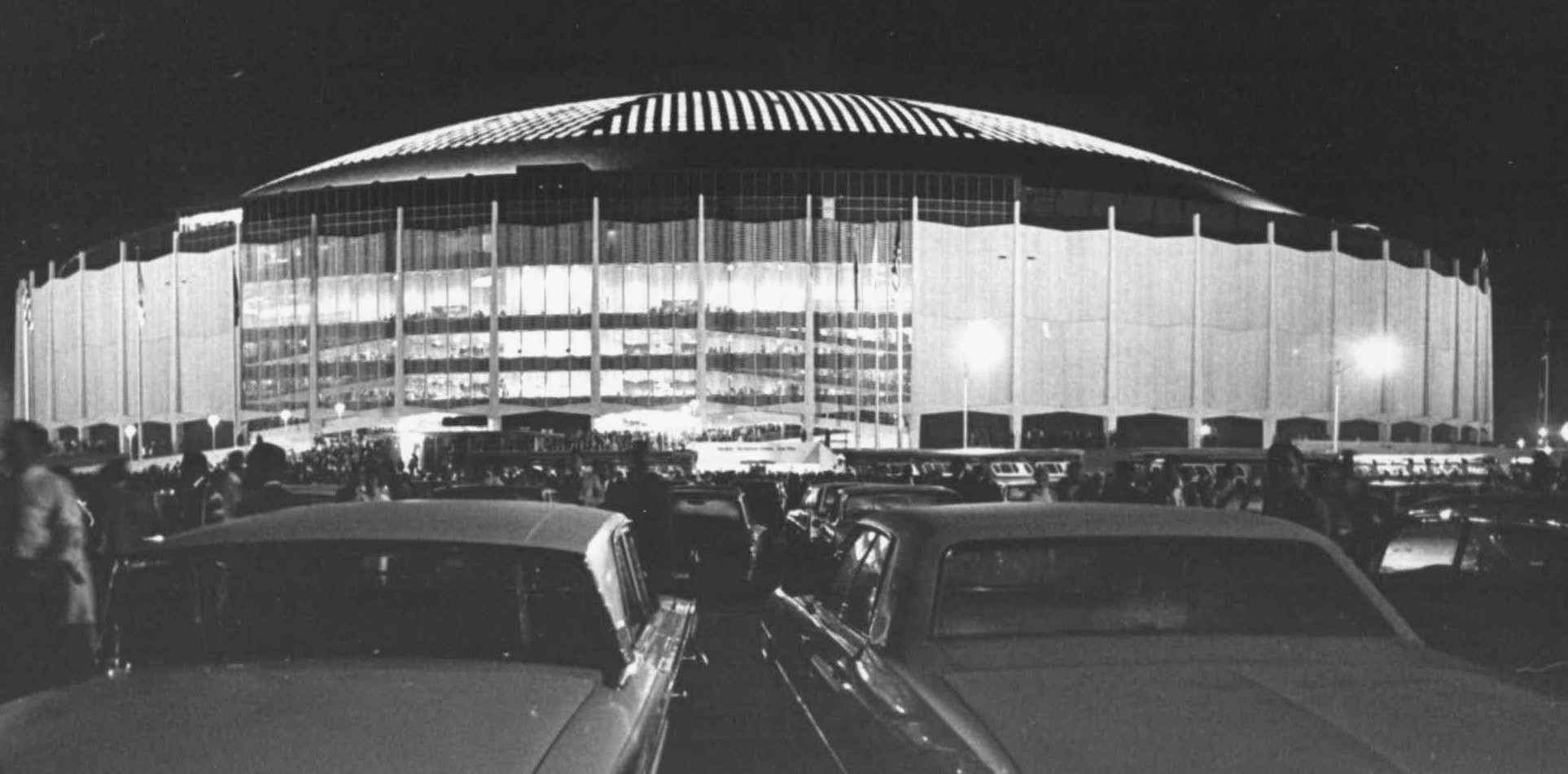
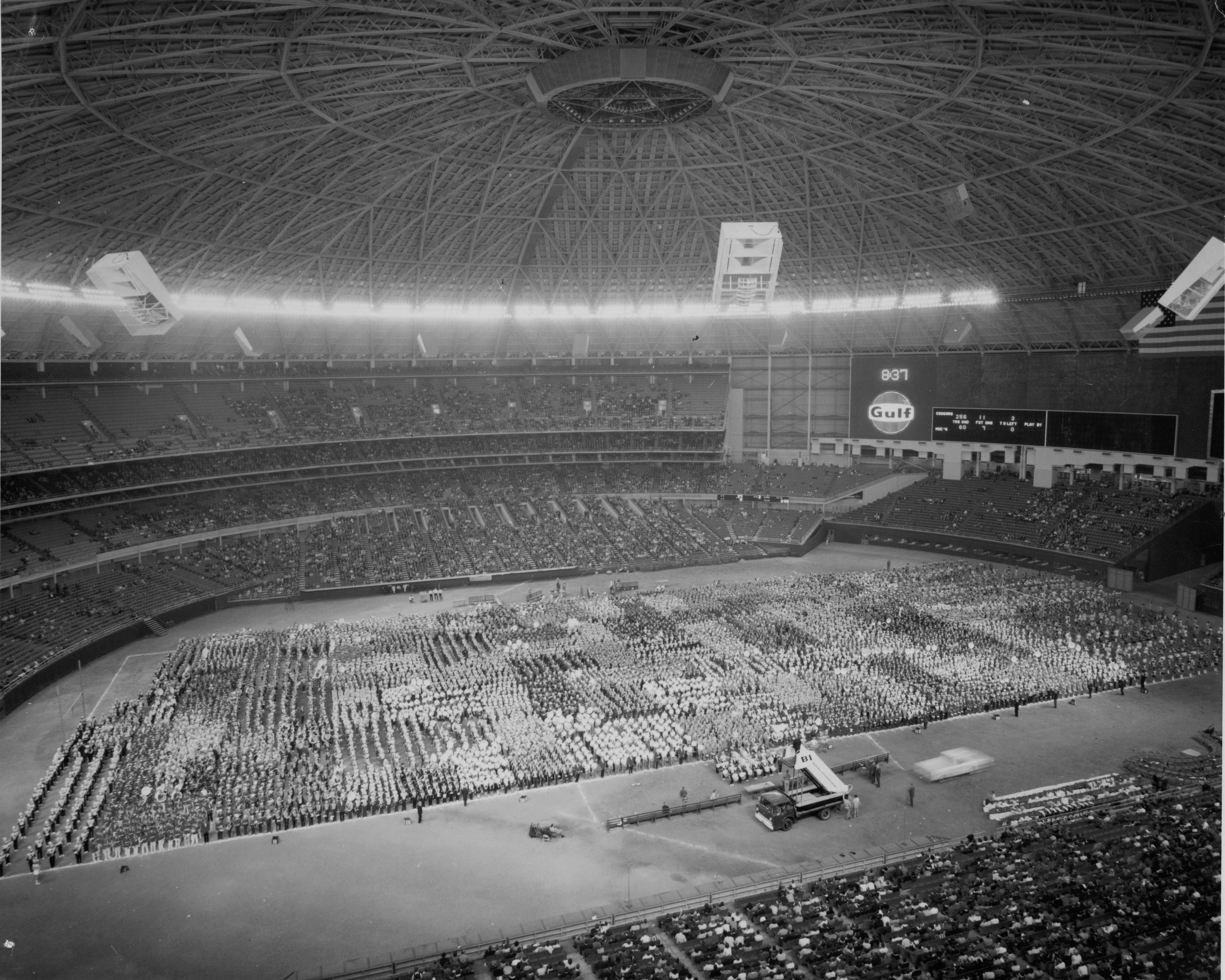
The Houston Astrodome was the first domed stadium, with an enclosing roof.

Domed stadiums are distinguished from conventional stadiums by their enclosing roofs. Many of these are not actually domes in the pure architectural sense, some being better described as vaults, some having truss-supported roofs and others having more exotic designs such as a tensegrity structure. But, in the context of sports stadiums, the term "dome" has become standard for all covered stadiums, particularly because the first such enclosed stadium, the Houston Astrodome, was built with an actual dome-shaped roof. Some stadiums have partial roofs, and a few have even been designed to have moveable fields as part of the infrastructure. Caesars Superdome in New Orleans is a true dome structure made of a lamellar multi-ringed frame and has a diameter of 680 feet (210 m). It is the largest fixed domed structure in the world.

Even though enclosed, dome stadiums are called stadiums because they are large enough for, and designed for, what are generally considered to be outdoor sports such as athletics, American football, association football, rugby, and baseball. Those designed for what are usually indoor sports like basketball, ice hockey and volleyball are generally called arenas.

== Design issues ==
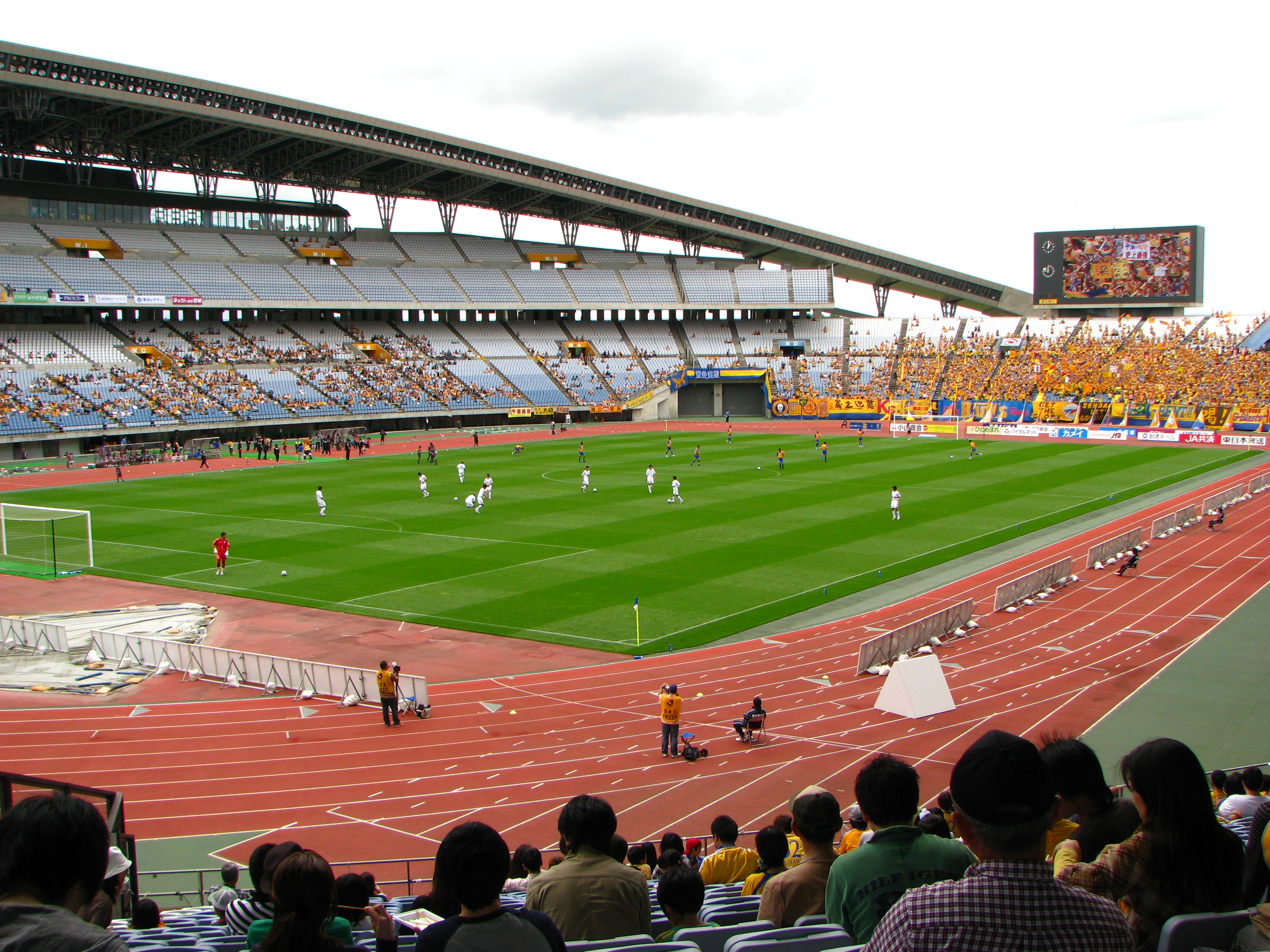
The most common form of multi-purpose stadiums feature a running track surrounding a football pitch.

Different sports require different playing surfaces of various size and shape. Some stadiums are designed primarily for a single sport while others can accommodate different events, particularly ones with retractable seating. Stadiums built specifically for association football are common in Europe; Gaelic games stadiums, such as Croke Park, are common in Ireland, while stadiums built specifically for baseball or American football are common in the United States. The most common multiple use design combines a football pitch with a running track, although certain compromises must be made. The major drawback is that the stands are necessarily set back a good distance from the pitch, especially at the ends of the pitch. In the case of some smaller stadiums, there are not stands at the ends. When there are stands all the way around, the stadium takes on an oval shape. When one end is open, the stadium has a horseshoe shape. All three configurations (open, oval and horseshoe) are common, especially in the case of American college football stadiums. Rectangular stadiums are more common in Europe, especially for football where many stadiums have four often distinct and very different stands on the four sides of the stadium. These are often all of different sizes and designs and have been erected at different periods in the stadium's history. The vastly differing character of European football stadiums has led to the growing hobby of ground hopping where spectators make a journey to visit the stadium for itself rather than for the event held there. In recent years the trend of building completely new oval stadiums in Europe has led to traditionalists criticising the designs as bland and lacking in the character of the old stadiums they replace.

In North America, where baseball and American football are the two most popular outdoor spectator sports, a number of football/baseball multi-use stadiums were built, especially during the 1960s, and some of them were successful.

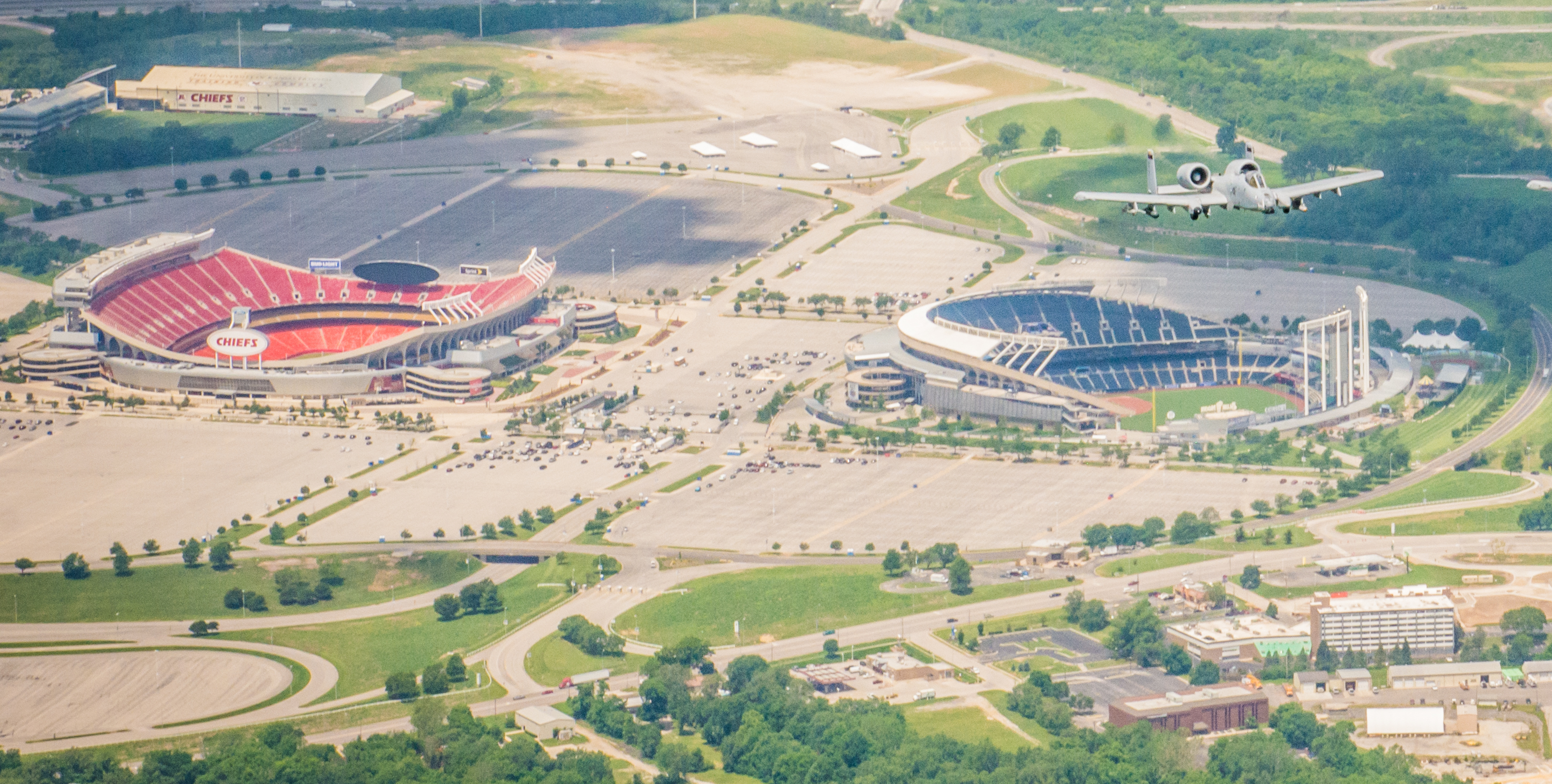
American football–baseball multi-purpose stadiums were replaced by separate venues for the two sports, such as the Truman Sports Complex.

Since the requirements for baseball and football are significantly different, the trend has been toward the construction of single-purpose stadiums, beginning with Kansas City in 1972–1973 and accelerating in the 1990s. In several cases, an American football stadium has been constructed adjacent to a baseball park, to allow for the sharing of mutual parking lots and other amenities. With the rise of Major League Soccer, the construction of soccer-specific stadiums has also increased since the late 1990s to better fit the needs of that sport. In many cases, earlier baseball stadiums were constructed to fit into a particular land area or city block. This resulted in asymmetrical dimensions for many baseball fields. Yankee Stadium, for example, was built on a triangular city block in The Bronx, New York City. This resulted in a large left field dimension but a small right field dimension.

Before more modern football stadiums were built in the United States, many baseball parks, including Fenway Park, the Polo Grounds, Wrigley Field, Comiskey Park, Tiger Stadium, Griffith Stadium, Milwaukee County Stadium, Shibe Park, Forbes Field, Yankee Stadium, and Sportsman's Park were used by the National Football League or the American Football League. (To a certain extent, this continues in lower football leagues as well, with the venue now known as Charles Schwab Field Omaha being used as the home stadium of the United Football League's Omaha Nighthawks.) Along with today's single use stadiums is the trend for retro-style ballparks closer to downtown areas. Oriole Park at Camden Yards was the first such ballpark for Major League Baseball to be built, using early-20th-century styling with 21st-century amenities.

There is a solar-powered stadium in Taiwan that produces as much energy as it needs to function. Stadium designers often study acoustics to increase noise caused by fans' voices, aiming to create a lively atmosphere.

=== Lighting ===
Until the advent of floodlights, most games played on large areas had to rely on natural lighting. Bramall Lane was reportedly the first floodlit stadium. Floodlighting in association football dates as far back as 1878, when there were floodlit experimental matches at Bramall Lane, Sheffield during the dark winter afternoons. With no national grid, lights were powered by batteries and dynamoes, and were unreliable. Since the development of electrical grids, lighting has been an important element in stadium design, allowing games to be played after sundown, and in covered, or partly covered stadiums that allow less natural light, but provide more shelter for the public.

Modern stadium lighting has increasingly shifted toward LED technology. This LED technology achieves energy savings of up to seventy to eighty percent compared to older systems. Professional leagues such as FIBA and FIFA now enforce regulatory requirements ensuring that stadiums meet ultra high definition broadcasting standards. Some nations have introduced funding programs and financial incentives to encourage organizations to make this transition. Research performed by Rami David Orejón-Sánchez suggests that oval-shaped distributions of luminaires produces the most efficient lighting patterns. As a result, many stadiums are pairing these upgrades with renewable energy. The Philadelphia Eagles recently installed over ten thousand solar panels alongside LED lighting. This has reduced the stadiums wattage consumption by more than fifty percent.

Indoor stadiums must use grow lights for natural grass turf. These high-energy systems contribute to light pollution and increase carbon emissions. Spillover lighting into surrounding residential areas has linked to many health concerns that include cardiovascular issues and interrupted sleep.

== Spectator areas and seating ==
An "all-seater" stadium has seats for all spectators. Other stadiums are designed so that all or some spectators stand to view the event. The term "all-seater" is not common in the U.S., as very few American stadiums have sizeable standing-only sections. Poor stadium design has contributed to disasters, such as the Hillsborough disaster and the Heysel Stadium disaster. Since these, all Premier League, UEFA European Championship and FIFA World Cup qualifying matches require all spectators to be seated. Seating areas may be known as terraces, tiers, or decks. Originally set out for standing room only, they are now usually equipped with seating. Seating typically follows stringent requirements - most notably the egress of spectators, which is a requirement to allow clear pathways to exit, which is why many seats in spectator arenas are tip up seats or folding seats. In the UK, it is notable to ensure your seating is Green Guide Compliant.

Another term used in the US is bleachers, which is mostly used for seating areas with bench seats as opposed to individual seats, and which often are uncovered; the name refers to the bleaching effect direct, unshaded sunlight has on the benches and patrons in those sections. Many stadiums make luxury suites or boxes available to patrons at high prices. These suites can accommodate ten to thirty people, depending on the venue. Luxury suites at events such as the Super Bowl can cost hundreds of thousands of dollars.

=== Safety and security ===
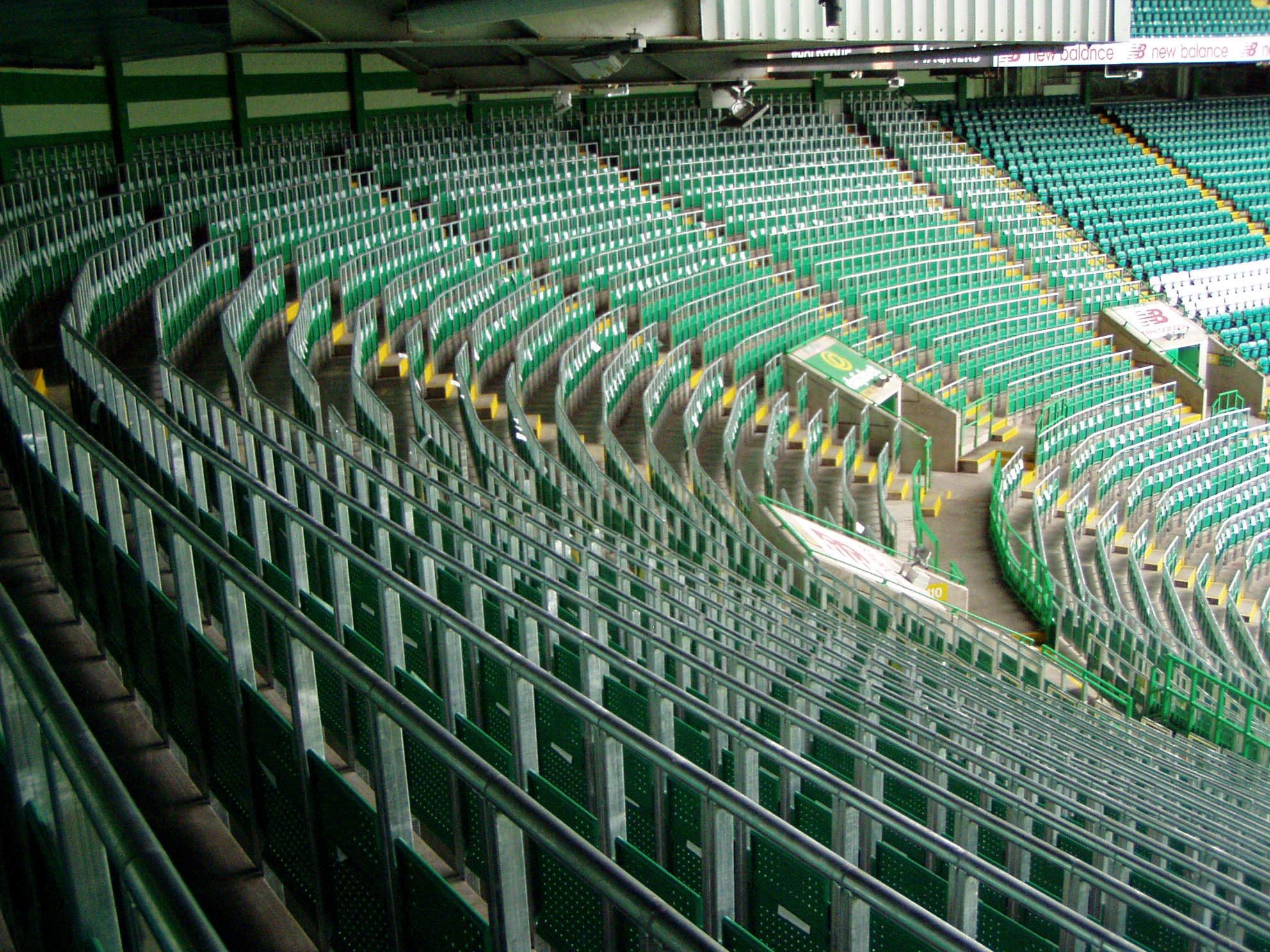
Safe standing designs, such as rail seating (pictured), help prevent crowd crushes, and were widely adopted following the Hillsborough disaster.

Due to the number of people congregating in stadiums and the frequency of events, many notable accidents have occurred in the past, some causing injury and death. For example, the Hillsborough disaster was a human crush at Hillsborough Stadium in Sheffield, England on 15 April 1989. The resulting 97 deaths and 765 injuries makes this the worst disaster in British sporting history. Much effort has been spent to avoid the recurrence of such events, both in design and legislation. Especially where there is a perceived risk of terrorism or violence attention remains high to prevent human death and keep stadiums as places where families can enjoy a public event together. In Europe and South America, during the twentieth century, it was common for violent bands of supporters to fight inside or close to association football stadiums. In the United Kingdom they are known as hooligans. Structural features that increase safety include separate entry and exit accesses for each spectator area, especially separating accesses for home and visitor supporters, dividing walls, glass parapets, vibration attenuation and sprinkler systems. Security features that have been adopted include armed surveillance, Identity document checks, video surveillance, metal detectors, and security searches to enforce rules that forbid spectators to carry dangerous or potentially dangerous items.

== Political and economic issues ==
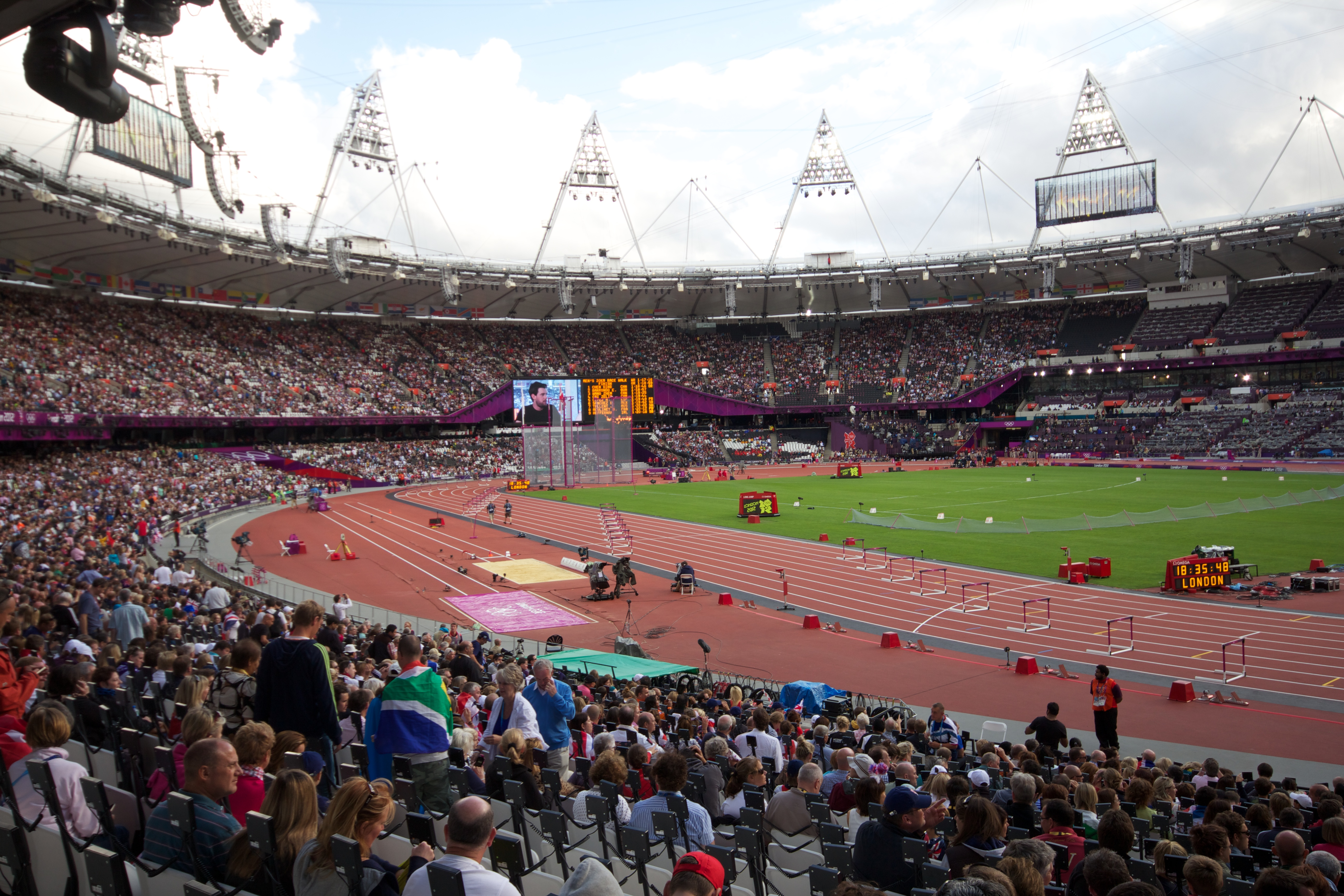
The construction of London Stadium was pledged as part of London's bid for the 2012 Summer Olympics.

Modern stadiums, especially the largest among them, are megaprojects that can only be afforded by the largest corporations, wealthiest individuals, or government. Sports fans have a deep emotional attachment to their teams. In North America, with its closed-league "franchise" system, there are fewer teams than cities which would like them. This creates tremendous bargaining power for the owners of teams, whereby owners can threaten to relocate teams to other cities unless governments subsidize the construction of new facilities.

In Europe and Latin America, where there are multiple association football clubs in any given city, and several leagues in each country, no such monopoly power exists, and stadiums are built primarily with private money. Outside professional sports, governments are also involved through the intense competition for the right to host major sporting events, primarily the Summer Olympics and the FIFA World Cup (of association football), during which cities often pledge to build new stadiums in order to satisfy the International Olympic Committee (IOC) or FIFA.

=== Corporate naming ===
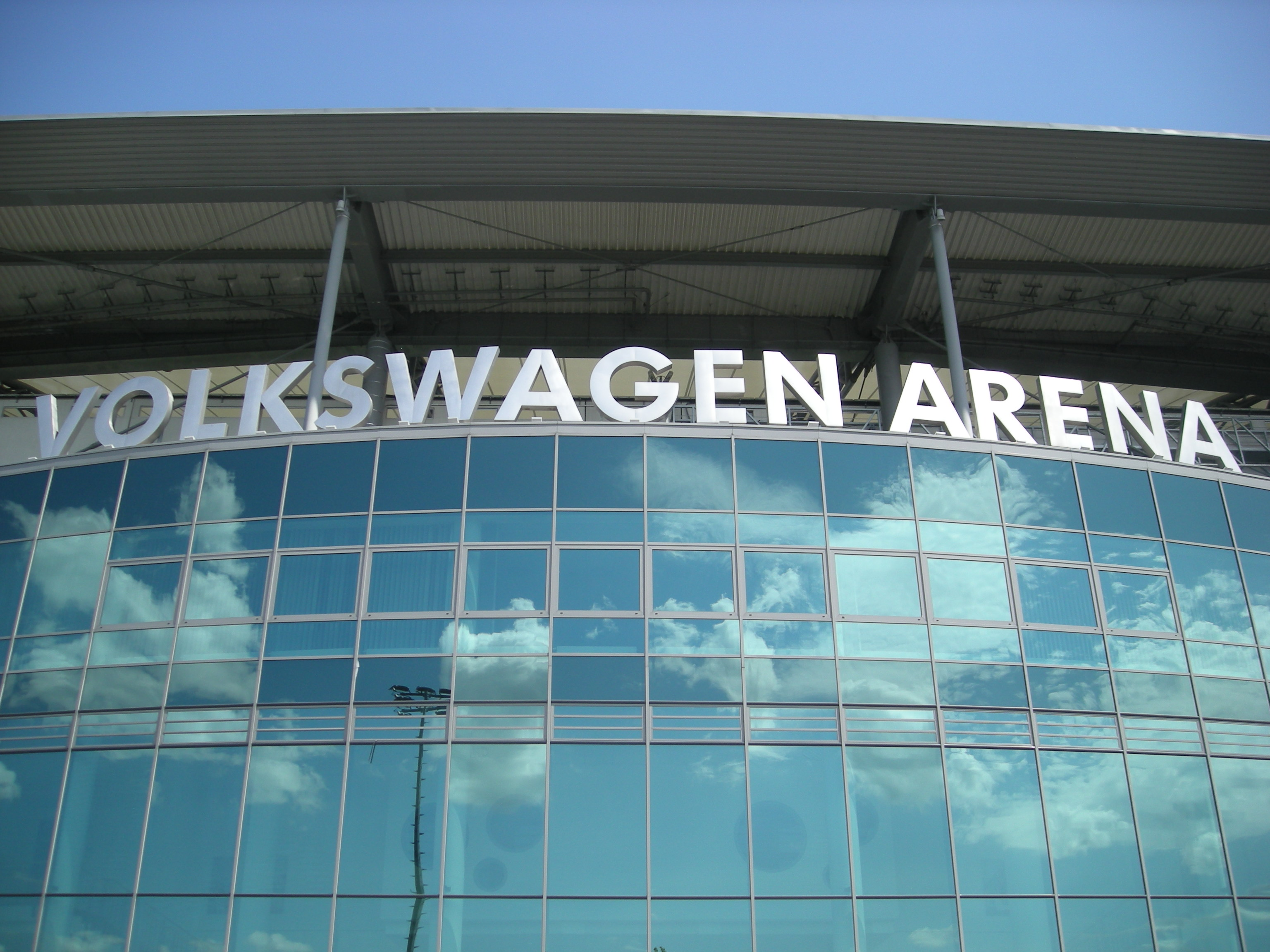
The facade of Volkswagen Arena, one of many stadiums which bear an official sponsor name

In the early 21st century, in an effort to reduce the burden of the massive expense of building and maintaining a stadium, many American and European sports teams have sold the rights to the name of the facility. This trend, which began in the 1970s, but accelerated greatly in the 1990s, has led to sponsors' names being affixed to both established stadiums and new ones. In some cases, the corporate name replaces (with varying degrees of success) the name by which the venue has been known for many years. But many of the more recently built stadiums, like the Volkswagen Arena in Wolfsburg, Germany, have never been known by a non-corporate name. The sponsorship phenomenon has since spread worldwide. There remain a few municipally owned stadiums, which are often known by a name that is significant to their area (for example, Boston's Fenway Park). In recent years, some government-owned stadiums have also been subject to naming-rights agreements, with some or all of the revenue often going to the team(s) that play there.

One consequence of corporate naming has been an increase in stadium name changes, when the namesake corporation changes its name, or if it is the naming agreement simply expires. Phoenix's Chase Field, for example, was previously known as Bank One Ballpark, but was renamed to reflect the takeover of the latter corporation. San Francisco's historic Candlestick Park was renamed as 3Com Park for several years, but the name was dropped when the sponsorship agreement expired, and it was another two years before the new name of Monster Cable Products' Monster Park was applied. Local opposition to the corporate naming of that particular stadium led San Francisco's city council to permanently restore the Candlestick Park name once the Monster contract expired. More recently, in Ireland, there has been huge opposition to the renaming of Dublin's historic Lansdowne Road as the Aviva Stadium. Lansdowne was redeveloped as the Aviva, opening in May 2010.

On the other hand, Los Angeles' Great Western Forum, one of the earliest examples of corporate renaming, retained its name for many years, even after the namesake bank no longer existed, the corporate name being dropped only after the building later changed ownership. This practice has typically been less common in countries outside the United States. A notable exception is the Nippon Professional Baseball league of Japan, in which many of the teams are themselves named after their parent corporations. Also, many newer European football stadiums, such as the University of Bolton and Emirates Stadiums in England and Signal Iduna Park and Allianz Arena in Germany have been corporately named.

This new trend in corporate naming (or renaming) is distinguishable from names of some older venues, such as Crosley Field, Wrigley Field, and the first and second Busch Stadiums, in that the parks were named by and for the club's owner, which also happened to be the name of the company owned by those clubowners. (The current Busch Stadium received its name via a modern naming rights agreement.)

During the 2006 FIFA World Cup in Germany, some stadiums were temporarily renamed because FIFA prohibits sponsorship of stadiums. For example, the Allianz Arena in Munich was called the FIFA World Cup Stadium, Munich during the tournament. Likewise, the same stadium will be known as the "München Arena" during the European Competitions. Similar rules affect the Imtech Arena and Veltins-Arena. This rule applies even if the stadium sponsor is an official FIFA sponsor—the Johannesburg stadium then commercially known as "Coca-Cola Park", bearing the name of one of FIFA's major sponsors, was known by its historic name of Ellis Park Stadium during the 2010 FIFA World Cup. Corporate names are also temporarily replaced during the Olympics.

== Sustainability ==
=== Environmental impact ===
Modern stadiums create major environmental problems due to the substantial use of energy and their reliance on carbon-intensive materials. With sporting events becoming more popular around the world, stadiums are becoming much larger resulting in more energy being used. For example, a single sporting event in an average Major League Baseball (MLB) stadium consumes between 10,000 and 20,000 kilowatts per day, resulting in an annual consumption of up to 1.6 million kilowatts or 1,620 megawatts. By contrast, a home in the United States rarely consumes more than 12,000 kilowatts per year. This high level of energy consumption significantly increases the use of greenhouse gas emissions, which are attained from fossil fuels.

With the use of ordinary materials such as steel, concrete, and asphalt, stadiums are further contributing to environmental destruction. In fact, concrete is one of the most carbon intensive construction materials in the world. As stadium construction continues to evolve, experts recommend that stadiums use more sustainable materials like recycled steel, wood, and bamboo. Not only do they minimize the use of raw materials like iron and coal, but they also assist in the prevention of large waste buildups in landfills.

Transportation issues are also a leading factor in the environmental strain of these stadiums. According to the Health Effects Institute, the increased traffic around modern North American stadiums creates exposure zones that put 30–40% of the people living around them at risk of potential health issues. Many stadiums are attempting to counteract these issues by implementing solar panels and high efficiency lighting to reduce their carbon footprint.

Waste production further compounds the negative environmental effects of stadiums. With stadiums often being sold out, they generate a great amount of solid waste that tends to reside in landfills. Some stadiums have demonstrated effective measures to counteract this. For example, Lincoln Financial Field, home of the Philadelphia Eagles, has achieved a ninety-nine percent diversion of waste from landfills and an operation of hundred percent clean energy, and Allegiant Stadium, home of the Las Vegas Raiders, has implemented a food collection program and a biomass machinery program that has reduced landfill contributions as well.

As a result of these changes, the construction and development of green stadiums has increased. They address these negative effects to the environment by incorporating renewable energy, water conservation, and low-embodied carbon materials. Data from a choice experiment showed fans willingness to pay more to attend games if it was at the expense of green features. According to a scenario analysis, stadiums that incorporate these technologies could increase their ticket sales despite the increase in ticket prices.

=== Social impact ===
Beyond environmental sustainability concerns, stadiums also put pressure on social sustainability. The construction of stadiums can sometimes promote social injustice and inequality, especially in marginalized communities. Stadium construction, often around low income or minority neighborhoods, can displace residents, accelerate gentrification, and put significant environmental stress on communities. Tropicana Field in St. Petersburg Florida, home of the Tampa Bay Rays, is a prime example of this, where its construction disrupted the surrounding black neighborhoods and furthered decades of racial injustice. Built in 1990 on the Gas Plant District, a nearly 86 acre site home to a thriving black community already facing environmental challenges from intensive highway development, the stadium's construction and urban development dismantled the already established community, forcing several families and black-owned businesses out of the area.

Despite this, sport remains a powerful tool that can drive change including social activism, environmental activism, diplomacy, public health and so on. Similarly, so can the stadiums that sports are played in. Given the increase in environmental awareness and calls for team ownership to incorporate sustainable practices into their stadiums, especially renewable energy and waste management, stadiums are increasingly becoming more environmentally viable because of the broader social concern. As stadiums continue to be built and social pressure continues to rise emerges a cycle of continued development in stadium sustainability standards, showing that society is capable of impacting stadium sustainability.

== Music venues ==
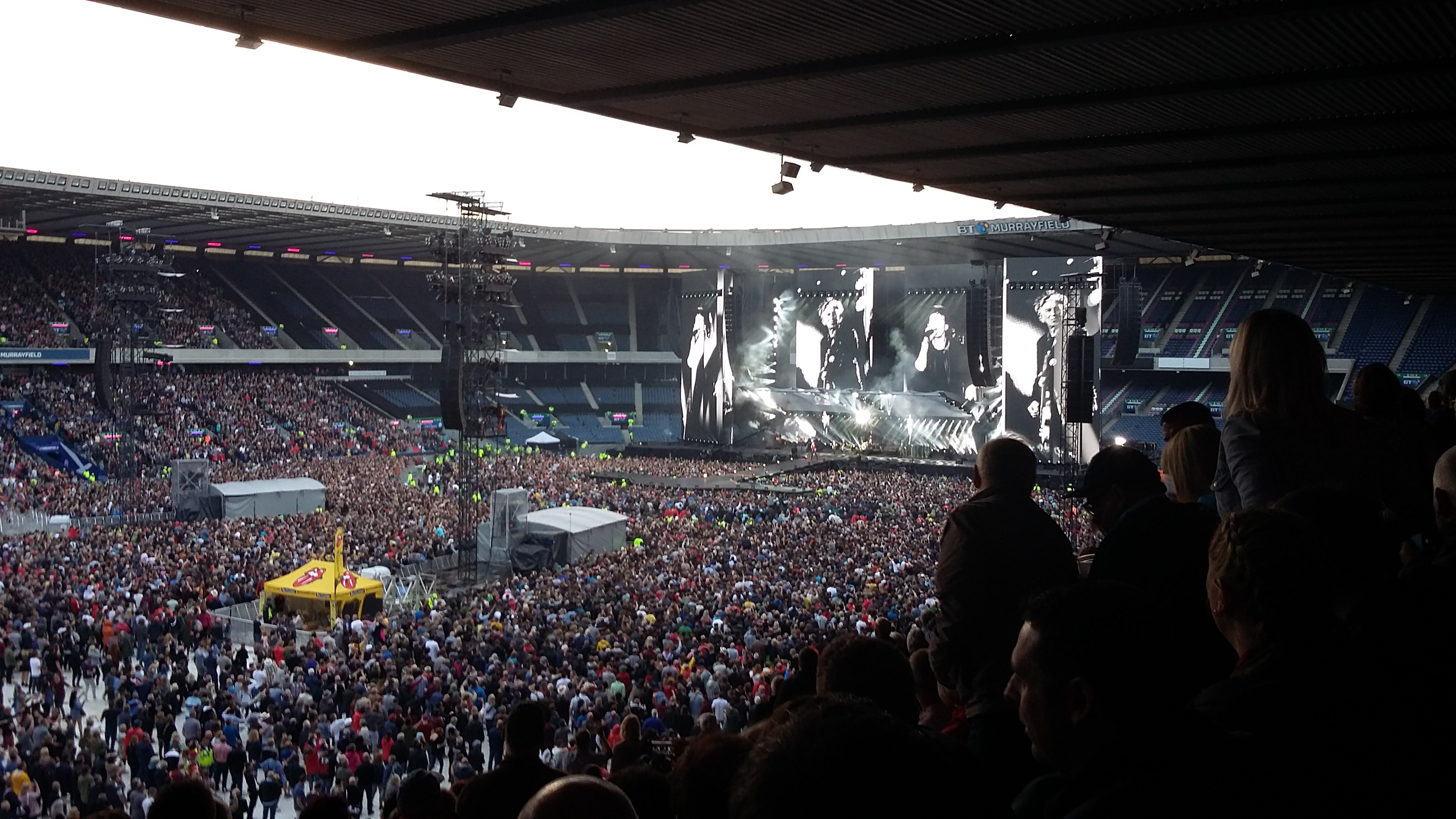
A concert stage set up inside a stadium

Although concerts, such as classical music, had been presented in them for decades, beginning in the 1960s stadiums began to be used as live venues for popular music, giving rise to the term "stadium rock", particularly for forms of hard rock and progressive rock. The origins of stadium rock are sometimes dated to when the Beatles played Shea Stadium in New York in 1965. Also important was the use of large stadiums for American tours by bands in the later 1960s, such as the Rolling Stones, Grand Funk Railroad and Led Zeppelin. The tendency developed in the mid-1970s as the increased power of amplification and sound systems allowed the use of larger and larger venues. Smoke, fireworks and sophisticated lighting shows became staples of arena rock performances. Key acts in this era included Journey, REO Speedwagon, Boston, Foreigner, Styx, Kiss, Peter Frampton and Queen. In the 1980s arena rock became dominated by glam metal bands, following the lead of Aerosmith and including Mötley Crüe, Quiet Riot, W.A.S.P. and Ratt. Since the 1980s, rock, pop and folk stars, including the Grateful Dead, Madonna, Michael Jackson, Beyoncé, Lady Gaga and Taylor Swift, have undertaken large-scale stadium based concert tours.

== See also ==
- Architectural structure
- List of nonbuilding structure types
- Amphitheatre
- Jumbotron
- Performing arts center
- Sport venue
- Sports complex
- Theater
- List of indoor arenas
- List of sports attendance figures
- Lists of stadiums

== Bibliography ==
- John, Geraint; Sheard, Rod; Vickery, Ben (2016). Stadia: The Populous Design and Development Guide. doi:10.4324/9781315751214. ISBN 978-1-317-61448-7.
- Lisle, Benjamin D. (2017). Modern Coliseum: Stadiums and American Culture. Philadelphia: U of Pennsylvania Press. p. 321.
- Serby, Myron W. (1930). The Stadium; A Treatise on the Design of Stadiums and Their Equipment. New York, Cleveland: American Institute of Steel, inc. OCLC 23706869.
