= Kevin Corrigan (disambiguation) =

Kevin Corrigan (born 1969) is an American actor.

Kevin Corrigan may also refer to:

- Kevin Corrigan (lacrosse) (born 1958), American lacrosse coach
- Kevin Corrigan (rugby union), rugby union player
