= Ned Lightfoot =

Irish rugby union player

- Full name: Edward John Lightfoot
- Born: 29 November 1907 Dublin, Ireland
- Died: 25 March 1981 (aged 73)
- School: Castleknock College

Rugby union career
- Position: Wing
International career
Years	Team	Apps	(Points)
1931–33	Ireland	11	(9)

Edward John Lightfoot (29 November 1907 — 25 March 1981) was an Irish international rugby union player.

Born in Dublin, Lightfoot played in the first XV at Castleknock College and played his senior rugby for Lansdowne.

Lightfoot was capped 11 times for Ireland, debuting in the 1931 Five Nations. This included a match against the touring 1931–32 Springboks, as part of an All-Lansdowne three-quarter line, alongside Morgan Crowe, Eugene Davy and his Castleknock teammate Jack Arigho. He scored two tries in Ireland's win over Scotland at Murrayfield in 1932.

== See also ==
- List of Ireland national rugby union players
