= Belgium Fizzapapa's 7's =

- Union: Belgium
- Nickname: Belgium Fizzapapa's 7's
Team kit

Belgium Fizzapapa's 7's is an invitational rugby sevens team. They participate in 7's tournaments all around the world.

== Prize list ==
- Montreal 7's (Canada), September 2026: Finalist Cup
- Tullamore 7's (Ireland), July 2026: Finalist Cup
- Borneo 7's (Malaysia), April 2026: Finalist Plate
- Tullamore 7's (Ireland), July 2025: Winner Cup
- New York 7's (USA), November 2024: 1/2 Finalist Cup
- Montreal 7's (Canada), September 2024: Finalist Cup
- Tullamore 7's (Ireland), July 2024: 1/2 Finalist Cup
- Montreal 7's (Canada), September 2023: Finalist Cup
- Tullamore 7's (Ireland), July 2023: 1/4 Finalist Cup
- Montreal 7's (Canada), September 2022: Finalist Cup
- Tullamore 7's (Ireland), July 2022: Finalist Cup
- Howard Hinton 7's (France), October 2021: 1/2 Cup Finalist
- New York 7's (USA), November 2019: 3rd
- Tullamore 7's (Ireland), July 2019: Winner Cup
- Madrid 7's (Spain), June 2019: 1/4 Finalist Cup
- Borneo 7's (Malaysia), March 2019: 1/4 Finalist Cup
- Tullamore 7's (Ireland), July 2018: 3rd
- Madrid 7's (Spain), June 2018: 3rd
- Benidorm 7's (Spain), May 2018: Winner Plate
- Bornéo 7's (Malaysia), March 2018: Finalist Bowl
- New York 7's (USA), November 2017: Winner Cup
- Brussels 7's (Belgium), July 2017: Finalist Cup
- Madrid 7's (Spain), June 2017: Winner Plate
- Benidorm 7's (Spain), June 2017: Finalist Cup
- Dublin 7's (Ireland), May 2017: 1/2 Cup Finalist
- Waterloo 7's (Belgium), December 2016: 3rd
- Montreal 7's (Canada), September 2016: Finalist Cup
- Budapest 7's (Hungary), July 2016: Finalist Plate
- Benidorm 7's (Spain), May 2016: 1/2 Cup Finalist
- Gand 7's (Belgium), March 2016: Winner Cup
- Borneo 7's (Malaysia), March 2016: Finalist Bowl
- Dubai 7's (United Arab Emirates), December 2015: Winner Plate
- London 7's (England), July 2015: 1/2 Plate Finalist
- Montreal 7's (Canada), July 2015: 3rd Plate
- Benidorm 7's (Spain), May 2015: Winner Club Gold Cup
- Montreal 7's (Canada), September 2014: 3rd
- Budapest 7's (Hungary), July 2014: 3rd
- Benidorm 7's (Spain), May 2013: Finalist Plate
- Montreal 7's (Canada), September 2012: Winner Cup
- Athlone 7's (Ireland), August 2012: Finalist Plate
- Brussels 7's (Belgium), July 2012: Winner Cup
- Montreal 7's (Canada), October 2011: Winner Cup
- SOOS 7's (France), June 2011: Finalist Plate
- Benidorm 7's (Spain), May 2011: 1/4 Cup Finalist
- Geneva 7's (Switzerland), April 2011: 1/2 Plate Finalist
- Benidorm 7's (Spain), May 2010: Winner Plate
- Cracovia 7's (Poland), June 2009: Winner Cup
- Amsterdam 7's (Netherlands), May 2009: Finalist Plate
- Nancy 7's (France), April 2009: Bowl Winner
- Borneo 10's (Malaysia), November 2008: 1/2 Plate Finalist
- Paris 7's (France), October 2008: Finalist Cup
- Montreal 7's (Canada), October 2007: Winner Cup
- Tangier 7's (Morocco), May 2007: Finalist Bowl
- Seville 7's (Spain), July 2006: Finalist Plate
- Bangkok 10's (Thailand), February 2006: Winner Cup
- Montreal 7's (Canada), September 2005: Winner Cup
- Brussels 7's (Belgium), August 2005: Winner Cup
- Roma 7's (Italy), June 2005: 1/2 Plate Finalist
- Sofia 7's (Bulgaria), May 2005: Winner Cup
- Tangier 7's (Morocco), March 2005: 3rd
- Punta Del Este 7's (Uruguay), January 2005: Finalist Plate
- Montreal 7's (Canada), September 2004: Finalist Cup
- Kinsale 7's (Ireland), May 2004: 1/4 Cup Finalist
- São Paulo 7's (Brazil), December 2003: Winner Plate
- Bangkok 7's (Thailand), November 2003: 1/2 Bowl Finalist
- Kandy 7's (Sri Lanka), September 2003: Finalist Plate
- Nivelles 7's (Belgium), June 2003: Winner Cup
- Nairobi 7's (Kenya), June 2003: 1/2 Bowl Finalist
- Belgrade 7's (Serbia), June 2003: Winner Cup
- Sofia 7's (Bulgaria), May 2003: Winner Cup
- Euregio 7's (Belgium), April 2003: Winner Cup
- Krusevac 7's (Serbia), August 2002: 3rd
- Nivelles 7's (Belgium), June 2002: Winner Cup
- Benidorm 7's (Spain), May 2002: 1/2 Cup Finalist
- Chiang Mai 7's (Thailand), December 2001: 11th
- Kandy 7's (Sri Lanka), September 2001: 5th
- Nivelles 7's (Belgium), June 2001: Winner Cup
- Holyland 7's (Israel), September 2000: 1/2 Plate Finalist
- New York 7's (USA), November 1999: Finalist Cup
- Phuket 7's (Thailand), July 1999: 1/2 Cup Finalist
- Holyland 7's (Israel), June 1999: Finalist Bowl
- Prague 7's (Czech Republic), July 1999: 3rd
- Prague 7's (Czech Republic), July 1998: 3rd
- Prague 7's (Czech Republic), July 1997: 3rd

== Emblematic players ==
- Mathew Hocken
- Kevin Croke
- Neil Massinon
- Alain Gérard
- Loic Van Der Linden
- Francis N'Tamack
- Julien Berger
- Kevin Corrigan (rugby union)
- Conor Cleary
- Shane Thompson (godfather)
- David Nemsadze
- Johann Bombaerts
- Maxime Carabignac
- Luc Lafforgue
- Nicolas Nieto
- Guy Gérard (founding president)
