= Rory Moroney =

Irish rugby union player

- Full name: Rory Joseph Matthew Moroney
- Born: 3 October 1957 (age 69) Clonmel, Ireland

Rugby union career
- Position: Centre
International career
Years	Team	Apps	(Points)
1984–85	Ireland	3	(0)

Rory Joseph Matthew Moroney (born 3 October 1957) is an Irish former rugby union international.

Moroney is a native of Clonmel and was educated at Clongowes Wood College.

A centre, Moroney played for Dublin club Lansdowne, where he had a part in three Leinster Senior Cup and two Leinster Senior League titles. He competed at provincial level for both Leinster and Munster.

Moroney, capped three times for Ireland, was a Triple Crown winner in the 1985 Five Nations Championship.

In 1986, Moroney retired from first-class rugby at age 28 due to the commuting time involved.

== See also ==
- List of Ireland national rugby union players
