= Scott Deasy =

Irish rugby union player

- Born: 11 October 1988 (age 38) Cork, Ireland
- Height: 1.8 m (5 ft 11 in)
- Weight: 90 kg (14 st; 200 lb)
- School: Presentation Brothers College
- University: University College Cork

Rugby union career
- Position: Fly-Half
- Current team: Lansdowne
Amateur team(s)
Years	Team	Apps	(Points)
- Cork Constitution
2013–	Lansdowne		
Senior career
Years	Team	Apps	(Points)
2009–2013	Munster	37	(36)
- Correct as of 10 February 2013
International career
Years	Team	Apps	(Points)
- Ireland U19

Scott Deasy (born 11 October 1988) is an Irish rugby union player. He plays at fly-half, centre and fullback.

== Munster ==
After shining at various age grades with Presentation Brothers College, Cork, including three years with the Senior Cup Team, Deasy joined the Munster Academy in 2007.

He made his Munster debut as a replacement for Ronan O'Gara against Connacht in a Celtic League fixture on 26 December 2009. He caught attention when he replaced an injured Paul Warwick early in a league game against Edinburgh on 19 February 2010. Despite having a mixed night with his place-kicking, he scored a superb individual try when he raced through a gap, chipped ahead and won the race to the try-line. He made his first start for Munster on 19 March 2010 in a league fixture against Scarlets, playing fullback and winning the Man-of-the-Match award. Injuries brought Deasy into Munster's 2009–10 Heineken Cup squad, and he made his European debut in the semi-final against Biarritz on 2 May 2010. He played for Munster A during their 2009–10 British and Irish Cup campaign. His performances for club and province earned a full-time contract with Munster, and Deasy joined the senior Munster squad for the 2010–11 season.

Deasy started at fly-half for Munster A in their 31–12 2011–12 British and Irish Cup Final win against Cross Keys. Less than a week later, Deasy started at Fly-half for Munster in their final league game of the 2011–12 Pro 12 season against Ulster, after Ian Keatley withdrew with a knock. Deasy kicked 9 points in the 36–8 win, helping to secure a place in the play-offs for Munster. During the 2011–12 season, Deasy established himself as Munster's third-choice fly-half.

Deasy cites his coaches at PBC as the biggest influence on his career.

It was announced on 14 May 2013 that Deasy would be leaving Munster, to an as yet unannounced club.

Upon leaving Munster, Deasy did not seek another professional contract, and instead signed for amateur club Lansdowne Football Club, with whom he won the All-Ireland League in 2015. Deasy is now Lansdowne's all-time top scorer in the All Ireland League having amassed more than 600 points in the league for Lansdowne
