= Michael Gibson (rugby union) =

Irish rugby union international

- Full name: Michael Edward Gibson
- Born: 3 March 1954 (age 72) Dublin, Ireland
- Height: 6 ft 6 in (198 cm)

Rugby union career
- Position: No. 8
International career
Years	Team	Apps	(Points)
1979–88	Ireland	10	(0)

Michael Edward Gibson (born 3 March 1954) is an Irish former rugby union international. Born in Dublin, Gibson attended St Andrew's College and is a graduate of Trinity College Dublin.

== Professional career ==
Gibson, a 6 ft 6 in number eight, was capped ten times for Ireland, debuting in the 1979 Five Nations campaign. Most of his provincial rugby was with Leinster, with some matches for Munster, and he made an Irish Universities team for a tour of New Zealand during his time at Trinity College. His work with the Guinness Group brought him to various locations during his rugby career, with appearances at club level for Cork Constitution, Lansdowne and London Irish.

== See also ==
- List of Ireland national rugby union players
