= Mick English (rugby union) =

Irish rugby union player

- Born: Michael Anthony Francis English; 2 June 1933 Limerick, Ireland
- Died: 27 April 2010 (aged 76)
- Height: 1.74 m (5 ft 8 1/2 in)
- Weight: 79 kg (12.4 st; 174 lb)
- School: Rockwell College

Rugby union career
- Position: Fly-half
Amateur team(s)
Years	Team	Apps	(Points)
- UL Bohemians
–	Lansdowne		
Senior career
Years	Team	Apps	(Points)
- Munster
International career
Years	Team	Apps	(Points)
1958–1963	Ireland	16	(9)
1959	British Lions	0	(0)

Michael Anthony Francis English (2 June 1933 – 27 April 2010) was an Irish rugby union player, who won 16 caps for Ireland between 1958 and 1963, and was selected for the 1959 British Lions tour to Australia and New Zealand, though injury prevented English from winning any test caps for the touring side.

== Life ==
English was educated at Rockwell College and went on to join UL Bohemians and winning the Munster Senior Cup with the club in 1958, 1959 and 1962, before moving to Dublin and joining Lansdowne, with whom he won a Leinster Senior Cup in 1965. English went on to become Lansdowne's club president during the 1989–90 season.

His career with native province Munster saw English play against touring teams from Australia, South Africa and New Zealand. Internationally, English first played for Ireland in 1958, replacing Jack Kyle as the teams fly-half. In his 16 caps for his country, English scored 9 points, all from drop goals. In 1959, English won selection for the British Lions tour to Australia and New Zealand, and he played against Queensland and East Coast/Poverty Bay, though injury cut short his tour and prevented him from earning any test caps. English won his final cap for Ireland in December 1963.

In recognition of his contributions to Irish rugby, the Rugby Writers of Ireland inducted English into the Hall of Fame in 2008. English died on 27 April 2010 and was survived by his wife, Pauline, daughter Michelle and sons Conor and John.
