= Vincent Becker =

Irish rugby union footballer (born 1947)

- Full name: Vincent Anthony Mary Becker
- Born: 9 October 1947 (age 79) Dublin, Ireland

Rugby union career
- Position: Winger
International career
Years	Team	Apps	(Points)
1974	Ireland	2	(0)

Vincent Anthony Mary Becker (born 9 October 1947) is an Irish former sprinter and rugby union international.

A product of Mungret College, Becker was a Lansdowne and Leinster winger, capped twice for Ireland in their winning 1974 Five Nations Championship campaign. He had started his rugby union career as a scrum-half before transitioning to the wing, a position to which he brought considerable pace, as a two-time Irish national 100 metres champion.

In July 1971, Becker ran a national 100m record of 10.85 seconds in London.

== See also ==
- List of Ireland national rugby union players
