= Seán MacHale =

Irish rugby union player

- Born: 6 April 1936 Ballina, Ireland
- Died: 31 March 2023 (aged 86) Dublin, Ireland

Rugby union career
- Position: Prop
International career
Years	Team	Apps	(Points)
1965–67	Ireland	12	(0)

Seán MacHale (6 April 1936 — 31 March 2023) was an Irish rugby union international.

Born in Ballina, County Mayo, MacHale was a prop, capped 12 times for Ireland from 1965 to 1967. He played in Ireland's first ever win over the Springboks at Lansdowne Road in 1965 and was part of three Five Nations campaigns. At club level, he competed for Galwegians, Lansdowne and Bohemians. He was a business consultant by profession.

== See also ==
- List of Ireland national rugby union players
