= Mick Quinn (rugby union) =

Irish rugby union player

- Born: Michael Anthony Mary Quinn; 31 May 1952 (age 74) Dublin, Ireland
- School: Newbridge College

Rugby union career
- Position(s): Out-Half, Fly-Half
Amateur team(s)
Years	Team	Apps	(Points)
- Lansdowne Football Club
–	Leinster Rugby		
International career
Years	Team	Apps	(Points)
1973-1981	Ireland	10	(18)

Michael Anthony Mary Quinn (31 May 1952) is a former rugby union footballer who played international rugby as a fly-half for Ireland. He played schools rugby for Newbridge College and captained them to victory in the 1970 Schools Cup Final over Blackrock College RFC. He then moved on to play senior rugby for Lansdowne Football Club before earning a call up to the Ireland national team. In 1976 he was a member of the Ireland squad that went on tour of New Zealand and Fiji.

His family once owned the H Williams chain of supermarkets, which was later sold to Quinnsworth and subsequently to Tesco Ireland.
