= Robin Roe =

Irish clergyman and rugby union player

Robin Roe CBE MC (11 October 1928 – 15 July 2010) was an Irish clergyman known for his work as an army chaplain, and a rugby union player.

== Early life and education ==
Roe was born in Skeirke, Borris-in-Ossory, County Laois. He started playing rugby at The King's Hospital school, Dublin when he was ten years old. After studying at Trinity College, he was ordained a deacon in the Church of Ireland in 1953, and priest in 1954. He joined Lansdowne rugby football club for the 1953–54 season. he served a curacy at Sandford, Dublin in the Diocese of Dublin and Glendalough from 1953 to 1955.

== Rugby career ==
Roe was first selected to play for the Barbarians while studying at Trinity College in 1951. He played in a total of eleven matches for the Barbarians and scored two tries. From 1952 to 1957 Roe played in twenty-one matches for Ireland's national rugby team as hooker.

In 1955 Roe toured with the British and Irish Lions in South Africa, where he played approximately a dozen games (two as prop) and scored a try against Griqualand West. After injuring his ribs early in the tour, his appearances were limited but he still played when required. The tour lasted four months, and Roe's roommates were the 19-year-old Tony O'Reilly, Bill Williams and Bryn Meredith. Roe found the rugby in South Africa more demanding than he was accustomed to in Ireland, and he admired the consistent play of O'Reilly. He disliked South Africa's apartheid system as opposed to his beliefs as a priest. Roe's twenty-inch neck brought some ribbing from his teammates. The Catholics on the team joked that he had a great neck for a Roman collar.

In 1955 as an army chaplain based near London, he played about fifteen games for London Irish. Roe thought that Sunbury, the home base of the London Irish, was enjoyable; while the training at London Irish was rigorous, Roe believed that the team at Lansdowne was more settled. Roe regarded fellow hooker Karl Mullen, the man he replaced in the Ireland number 2 jersey and the captain of Ireland and the 1950 British and Irish Lions, as his toughest opponent.

In the summer of 1957 Roe was a member of the first Barbarians side to tour outside Britain or Ireland. The team's tour of Canada was a success, with a 6–0 won-lost record and a 227–23 points for-against ratio.

== Army chaplaincy ==
Roe joined the British Army in 1955, when he was commissioned (on a Short Service Commission) into the Royal Army Chaplains' Department as a Chaplain to the Forces 4th Class (equivalent to a captain in all other units, chaplains are traditionally addressed as padre regardless of rank). He switched to a full commission in 1958, and was promoted to Chaplain to the Forces 3rd Class (equivalent to a major) in 1961.

Roe distinguished himself for bravery while serving as a British Army chaplain attached to the 1st battalion, Lancashire Regiment in Aden in 1967. During the Arab police mutiny (part of the Aden Emergency), Roe heard gunfire and left Radfan Camp to investigate. He found a British Army lorry on fire with a number of British soldiers lying dead and wounded. Under heavy fire Roe helped the wounded soldiers to safety in Radfan Camp. Roe was unarmed, as is the custom for military chaplains. He only left the scene after being forcibly turned back by another officer, after he had been shot at and his personal Land Rover struck by machine gun fire. He was awarded the Military Cross for his courage under fire, the award was gazetted on 19 January 1968.

He was promoted to Chaplain to the Forces 2nd Class (lieutenant-colonel) in 1969, and to 1st Class (colonel) in 1973. In 1977 he was made an Honorary Chaplain to the Queen. He retired from the Army in 1982, and was appointed Commander of the Order of the British Empire (CBE) for his work as a chaplain in that year's Queen's Birthday Honours.

== Later life ==
Roe became Rector of Merrow, Surrey (Diocese of Guildford) in 1982 and served there until his retirement in 1989. He then moved to Shalford, Surrey and continued to take services within the diocese. He died on 15 July 2010.
