= Brian Glennon =

Irish rugby union player

- Full name: Brian Thomas Glennon
- Born: 17 April 1967 (age 59)

Rugby union career
- Position: Centre
International career
Years	Team	Apps	(Points)
1993	Ireland	1	(0)

Brian Thomas Glennon (born 17 April 1967) is an Irish former rugby union international.

Glennon attended De La Salle College Churchtown and captained their rugby team to the Leinster Schools Rugby Senior Cup title in 1985. A centre, he played his rugby for Lansdowne and Leinster, earning one Ireland cap. He came off the bench against France in the 1993 Five Nations, as a second-half replacement for an injured Phil Danaher.

== See also ==
- List of Ireland national rugby union players
