= Angus McKeen =

Irish rugby union player

Angus McKeen (born 13 February 1969) is a retired Irish rugby union footballer. He won one cap for Ireland at the 1999 Rugby World Cup, as well as playing for Lansdowne Football Club and Leinster. His position was tight-head prop-forward. He is a past-pupil of The King's Hospital school in Dublin. McKeen fulfilled his rugby ambition when he won an international cap for Ireland against Romania in the 1999 World Cup. McKeen was the first Lansdowne player to reach the 100 AIL match milestone. In total he represented Lansdowne 130 times in the AIL. He is in second place overall in Lansdowne AIL history. His international debut was against Romania on October 15, 1999 at Lansdowne Road Stadium.
