= Henry Dunlop =

Henry Wallace Doveton Dunlop (1844 – 1930) was a sports promoter, civil servant, engineer and, a former leader of Irish Rugby, founder of Lansdowne Football Club and figure behind the construction of the former Lansdowne Road stadium.

A champion sprinter, he won the 100- and 400-yard races at the inaugural Irish civil service athletics championships in August 1867. Becoming a speed walker ('pedestrianism' was then a mainstay athletics event), he won the 3-mile and 7-mile races at the second civil service athletics championships (4 July 1868); he also won the 2-mile race at the Dublin University athletics sports (the 'college races') on 14 June 1869. After victory in the 2-mile race at the third civil service championships (26 June 1869), he retired unbeaten in competition.

He remained involved in organising athletics events and was honorary secretary (1871–2) of the Dublin University Athletic Club, which managed the college races.

== Royal Irish Athletic Club ==
Dunlop become the key founder of the Royal Irish Athletic Club on 28 June 1872, set up to stage annual national athletics championships. It was renamed the Irish Champion Athletic Club (ICAC) in November 1872, and an executive committee was formed, comprising prominent representatives of athletic and sporting clubs in Dublin, Ulster, Cork, Galway and Limerick. An avowedly amateur body, it adopted rules from English rowing which explicitly excluded from competition professional athletes, as well as mechanics, artisans and labourers.

== Lansdowne and Lansdowne Road ==
After an initial meeting of the Royal Irish Athletic Club at Trinity College, the Provost of the college banned any further meeting on campus. Dunlop had to find a new home for his sporting endeavours. Writing in 1921, Dunlop stated: "I was therefore forced to look for another plot, and after careful consideration chose the present Lansdowne Road one. In conjunction with the late Edward Dillon (my trainer), I took a 69 year lease from the Pembroke Estate, paying a ground rent of £60 per annum, of part only of the premises stretching from the railway to about 60 yards from the Dodder. I laid down a cinder running path of a quarter-mile, laid down the present Lansdowne Tennis Club ground with my own theodolite."

Some 300 cartloads of soil from a trench beneath the railway were used to raise the ground, allowing Dunlop to utilise his engineering expertise to create a pitch envied around Ireland.

His lasting contribution to Irish sport was his founding of Lansdowne Football Club Lansdowne Football Club in 1872 and the creation of the Lansdowne Road ground, the home of Irish rugby.

Until its redevelopment as the Aviva Stadium in 2006–10, Lansdowne Road was regarded as the oldest international rugby ground in continuous use in the world, the first rugby international (Ireland hosting England) to be played there having occurred on 11 March 1878. The redeveloped stadium, opened in May 2010, includes a suite named in Dunlop's honour. Lansdowne Football Club has played rugby union ever since at the grounds, being one of the most prominent and successful rugby clubs in Leinster and Ireland.

== Personal life ==
He was born on 22nd February 1833 in Bombay, India the only son of (William) Henry Glasgow Dunlop (1809–1869), deputy superintendent of the Bombay Water Police, and his wife Mary Anne (1803–1902). His mother was originally from Dublin and his father from Prestwick in Ayrshire; they married in India on 14 February 1839. In 1848 Henry and his older sister, Mary Susan Elizabeth (b. 1840), moved to England into the care of relatives in Plymouth.

Dunlop was an engineering graduate of Trinity College, Dublin. He married Georgina Rebecca Cathcart (1848–1906), daughter of George Lambert Cathcart on 6th August 1873 at Molyneux Chapel, Leeson Park, Dublin. They had a daughter, Mary Pilkington Dunlop, and five sons: William Wallace Cathcart Dunlop; Revd Keith Malcolm Dunlop, Dublin diocesan registrar; Gordon Eyre Dunlop; Revd Douglas Lyall Chandler Dunlop, rector of Oughterard, Co. Galway, whose daughter Sheila married Michael Morris, 3rd Baron Killanin; and Walter Dunlop, principal of Codrington College, Barbados.

Dunlop married secondly (13 May 1911) Ethel, youngest daughter of William Hinch, at St Peter's church, Aungier Street, Dublin, and with her had two sons, one of whom, Eric Wallace Dunlop (1918–2008), was awarded the DFC while serving with the RAF in Burma in 1943, and an MBE in 1957 for services to industrial relations in Northern Rhodesia (Zambia). Henry Dunlop died at his home, 40 Sydney Avenue, Blackrock, on 16 April 1930.
