= Lansdowne Football Club =

Irish rugby union club, based in Dublin

Lansdowne
- Full name: Lansdowne Football Club
- Union: (Ireland) IRFU
- Branch: Leinster
- Founded: 1872; 154 years ago
- Region: County Dublin
- Ground(s): Aviva Stadium (Back Pitch); Lansdowne Road; Ballsbridge; Dublin 4 (Capacity: 1,000)
- President: Graham Quinn
- Coach: Rhys Ruddock
- Captain: Bobby Sheehan
- Top scorer: Matt Healy
- League: All-Ireland League Div. 1A
- 2024–25: 4th.
Team kit

Official website
- lansdownerugby.com

Lansdowne Football Club, is a rugby union team based in Dublin, Ireland. It is called Football Club instead of Rugby Football Club due to being founded before the formation of the IRFU. It was founded in 1872 by Henry Dunlop as the Irish Champion Athletic Club. Its senior team currently plays in Division 1A of the All-Ireland League. The club's playing colours are black, red and yellow hoops, with navy shorts.

Lansdowne have won the Leinster Senior Cup a record 30 times, winning it for the first in 1891. Lansdowne won the All Ireland League for the first time in March 2013 and also won the Fraser McMullen cup in the same season. Lansdowne completed the "All Ireland Double" again in May 2015 winning the All Ireland League and the Fraser McMullen again. In 2017/2018 captained by Ian Prendiville & coached by Mike Ruddock & Mark McHugh Lansdowne won the All Ireland League, The Bateman Cup, The Leinster Senior Cup and The Leinster Senior League Cup. Lansdowne is the first ever Leinster team to win all of these trophies in one season.

Together with Wanderers, Lansdowne have shared the use of Lansdowne Road since 1880, with each club having their own clubhouse at opposite ends of the ground. However, since 1974 the ground itself has been owned by the IRFU.

== Honours ==
- All-Ireland League: 3
  - 2012-13, 2014–15, 2017–18
- All-Ireland Cup: 8
  - 1921-22, 1928–29, 1929–30, 1930–31, 2017–18, 2019-20 (Joint winners), 2021-22, 2024-25
- Leinster Senior League 11
  - 1973-74, 1976–77, 1980–81, 1985–86, 1986–87, 1987–88, 1997–98, 2001–02, 2017–18, 2018–19, 2021–22
- Leinster Senior Cup 30
  - 1890-91, 1900–01, 1902–03, 1903–04, 1921–22, 1926–27, 1927–28, 1928–29, 1929–30, 1930–31, 1932–33, 1948–49, 1949–50, 1952–53, 1964–65, 1971–72, 1978–79, 1979–80, 1980–81, 1985–86, 1988–89, 1990–91, 1996–97, 1997–98, 2007–08, 2016–17, 2017–18, 2018-19, 2023-24, 2026-27
- Metropolitan Cup (17)
  - 1927, 1948, 1959, 1965, 1968, 1981, 1982, 1983, 1989, 2000, 2003, 2007, 2009, 2010, 2017, 2019, 2023
- Fraser McMullen Cup: 4

99-00, **2012-13, 2014–15, 2022-23

== Notable players ==
=== Current Leinster / Connacht / Munster -contracted players ===
- Sam Prendergast - Leinster
- Max Deegan - Leinster
- Tom Farrell - Munster
- James Ryan - Leinster
- Tadhg Beirne - Munster
- Rónan Kelleher - Leinster
- Charlie Tector - Leinster
- Peter Dooley - Leinster
- Dan Sheehan - Leinster
- Harry Byrne - Leinster
- Cormac Foley - Leinster
- Jerry Cahir - Connacht

=== Ireland sevens international players ===
The following Lansdowne players have played for the Ireland national rugby sevens team:

- Ian Fitzpatrick
- Foster Horan
- Adam Leavy
- Fiachra Baynes
- John O'Donnell
- Cian Aherne
- Tom Daly
- Mark Roche
- Peter Sullivan
- Aidan McCullen
- Eric Elwood
- Brian Glennon
- Vinnie Becker
- Sean Galvin
- Tom Roche

4 Lansdowne players represented Ireland at the Tokyo 2020 Olympics : Adam Leavy, Mark Roche, Foster Horan, Ian Fitzpatrick

1 Lansdowne player represented Ireland at the Paris 2024 Olympics : Mark Roche

=== Ireland Club international players ===
- Alan Maher 2007/2008/2009
- Kevin Corrigan 2007
- Greg Stafford 2008
- Colum Murphy 2009
- Robert Quinn 2009
- Matt Healy 2010
- Cian Aherne 2012/2013
- Craig Ronaldson 2012/2013
- Foster Horan 2013
- Charlie Butterworth 2013/2014/2016
- Mark Roche 2014/2015/2016
- Tyrone Moran 2014
- Willie Earle 2014/2017
- Stephen Gardiner 2015
- Ian Prendiville 2015/2016/2017
- Adam Boland 2015
- Phil Donnellan 2016
- Scott Deasy 2016/2017
- Eamonn Mills 2017/2018
- Harry Brennan 2018
- Jack Dwan 2018
- Dan McEvoy 2018
- Jack O'Sullivan 2019
- Alan Bennie 2019
- Cathal Eddy 2024
- Bobby Sheehan 2026

=== Ireland ===
(Republic of Ireland)

118 Lansdowne players have represented Ireland at full international level. The latest Lansdowne player to be capped by Ireland is Harry Byrne. On two occasions in 1931, Lansdowne supplied the entire Irish three-quarter line (Jack Arigho, Eugene Davy, Morgan Crowe and Ned Lightfoot), one of only three clubs ever to have done so at international level world-wide.

- Lawrence Bulger
- Jack Arigho
- Barry Bresnihan
- Brian Carney
- Paul Clinch
- Reggie Corrigan
- Ernie Crawford
- Morgan Crowe
- Bill Cunningham
- Eugene Davy
- Gordon D'Arcy
- Fergus Aherne
- Gabriel Fulcher
- Angus McKeen
- Eric Elwood
- Brian Glennon
- Kurt McQuilkin
- Aidan McCullen
- Noel Mannion
- Vincent Becker
- Mick English
- Michael Gibson
- Shane Horgan
- Bernard Jackman
- Moss Keane
- Patrick Berkery
- Mike Kiernan
- Ham Lambert
- Victor Le Fanu
- Mick English
- Des Fitzgerald
- Noel Feddis
- Con Feighery
- Seamus Kelly
- Barry McGann
- Ned Lightfoot
- Con Murphy
- Kevin O'Flanagan
- Mick O'Flanagan
- Conor O'Shea
- Noel Purcell
- Mick Quinn
- Robin Roe
- Patrick Casey
- Dick Spring
- Gordon Wood
- Devin Toner
- Martin Moore
- Jordi Murphy
- Eoin Reddan
- Dominic Ryan
- Donal Spring
- Mike McCarthy
- David O'Mahony
- Sean MacHale
- Matt Healy
- Max Deegan
- Rónan Kelleher
- Tadhg Beirne
- James Ryan
- Dave Kearney
- Harry Byrne
- Dan Sheehan
- Paul Clinch
- Tom Clancy
- Sam Prendergast
- Tom Farrell
- James Ryan

In 2023 Lansdowne’s Paul Clinch was awarded his first Irish cap for proudly representing Ireland on the tour of North America in 1989 against Canada and the USA making him the oldest Lansdowne member in the 150 year history of the club to receive his first cap. Clinch was one of a dozen players who played for Ireland against non 'original rugby nations' who were awarded their caps retrospectively. As well as playing international rugby union for Ireland, at least five Lansdowne players have also represented Ireland and/or Great Britain at other sports. Noel Purcell was also an international water polo player and represented both Great Britain and Ireland at the 1920 and 1924 Summer Olympics respectively. He helped Great Britain win the gold medal in 1920 Ham Lambert played 21 times for the Ireland cricket team between 1931 and 1947.. Brothers Kevin O'Flanagan and Mick O'Flanagan also played soccer for Ireland. On 30 September 1946 they both played for Ireland in a 1–0 defeat against England at Dalymount Park Brian Carney played as a junior with Lansdowne before switching rugby codes. He represented both Ireland and Great Britain at rugby league before returning to the union code.

=== British & Irish Lions ===
As well as representing Ireland, several Lansdowne players have also represented the British & Irish Lions.

- Lawrence Bolger: 1896 (49)
- Charles Vesey Boyle:1938 (279)
- Gerry Doran: 1899 (70)
- Bill Cunningham: 1924 (229)
- Mike Dunne: 1930 (273)
- Robin Roe: 1955 (376)
- Gordon Wood: 1959 (396)
- Mick English: 1959 (408)
- Barry Bresnihan: 1966, 1968 (459)
- Moss Keane: 1977 (533)
- Michael Kiernan: 1983 (582)
- Des Fitzgerald: 1986 British Lions vs Rest of the World XV , (605)
- Gordon D'Arcy: 2005, 2009 (720)
- Shane Horgan: 2005 (730)
- Tadhg Beirne: 2021, 2025 (838)
- Rónan Kelleher: 2021, 2025 (864)
- Dan Sheehan 2025 (873)
- James Ryan 2025 (880)

=== Other internationals ===
- (Argentina) Felipe Contepomi
- USA Mark O'Keeffe

Rugby league internationals

- Rody Corrigan: 1995
- Phelim Commerford: 1995
- Brian Carney: 1998
- Tom McCabe: 1996

== Ireland league records ==
AIL top try scorers

- Matt Healy: 37
- Dan McEvoy: 30
- Ross McCarron: 28
- Cian Aherne: 26
- Fiachra Baynes: 23
- Brian Glennon: 20
- Marcus Dillon: 20

Forward

- Ron Boucher: 19
- Tyrone Moran: 17
- Collie McEntee: 13

AIL top points scorers

- Scott Deasy: 951
- Craig Ronaldson: 417
- Eric Elwood: 384

Most capped AIL players

- Willie Earl: 145
- Enda Bohan: 142
- Ron Boucher: 134
- Angus McKeen: 130
- Steve Rooney: 128
- Shane Whelan: 114
- Ian Prendiville: 110
- Greg Stafford: 106
- Stephen O'Connor: 104
- Scott Deasy: 104

Most AIL Tries in a Season

- Peter Sullivan: 15 (2018/2019)
- Matt Healy: 14 (2009/2010)
- Ross McCarron 13 (2009/2010)

Most club tries in an AIL match

- 11 Tries

Lansdowne: 76 Trinity: 26 (2017-2018)

Largest win in an AIL match

- Lansdowne: 71 Blackrock: 15 (2005-2006)

== Trustees ==
Michael Kearney, Ciaran O'Reilly, Rory Williams, Dermot McCarron, Michael Ryan

== Past captains ==
- 1872-73 J. D. Ogilby
- 1873-74 J. D. Ogilby
- 1874-75 J. D. Ogilby
- 1875-76 D. T. Arnott
- 1876-77 F. W. Kidd
- 1877-78 J. W. Richards
- 1878-79 G. Scriven
- 1879-80 E. H. Nunns
- 1880-81 J. C. Bagot
- 1881-82 J. B. Moore
- 1882-83 J. B. Moore
- 1883-84 J. B. Moore
- 1884-85 R. G. Warren
- 1885-86 R. G. Warren
- 1886-87 R. G. Warren
- 1887-88 R. G. Warren
- 1888-89 R. G. Warren
- 1889-90 R. G. Warren
- 1890-91 V.C. Le Fanu
- 1891-92 V.C. Le Fanu
- 1892-93 F E. Davies
- 1893-94 F E. Davies
- 1894-95 S. C. Smith
- 1895-96 A. A. Brunker (resigned)R. P. Rowan
- 1896-97 R. W. Jeffares
- 1897-98 R. W. Jeffares
- 1898-99 G. P. Doran
- 1899-1900 G. P. Doran
- 1990-01 B. R. Doran
- 1901-02 B. R. Doran
- 1902-03 J. J. Coffey
- 1903-04 J. J. Coffey
- 1904-05 J. J. Warren
- 1905-06 J. J. Warren
- 1906-07 A. L. Leeper
- 1907-08 M. J. D’Alton (Resigned)J.J. Coffey
- 1908-09 H. G. Sugars
- 1909-10 G. Weldon
- 1910-11 R. Donnelly
- 1911-12 R. Donnelly
- 1912-13 C. R. Wilson
- 1913-14 J. Burke-Gaffney
- 1914-15 J. Burke-Gaffney
- 1919-20 N. M. Purcell
- 1920-21 N. M. Purcell
- 1921-22 W. E. Crawford
- 1922-23 W. E. Crawford
- 1923-24 W. A. Cunningham
- 1924-25 P. J. Whitty
- 1925-26 T. V. Harris
- 1926-27 T. O. Pike
- 1927-28 G. P. S. Hogan
- 1928-29 E. O’D. Davy
- 1929-30 E. O’D. Davy
- 1930-31 J. E. McEnery
- 1931-32 M. J. Dunne
- 1932-33 M. J. Dunne
- 1933-34 T. A. O’Reilly
- 1934-35 E. J. Lightfoot
- 1935-36 J. E. Aright
- 1936-37 Rev. St. J. Pike
- 1937-38 T. P. Sinnott
- 1938-39 T. J. O’Driscoll
- 1939-40 C. J. Murphy
- 1940-41 W. G. Sutherland
- 1941-42 W. G. Sutherland
- 1942-43 R. Mitchell
- 1943-44 N. J. Burke
- 1944-45 C. J. Murphy
- 1945-46 D. Hingerty
- 1946-47 C. Callan
- 1947-48 Rev. W. J. Moynan
- 1948-49 J. F. Coffey
- 1949-50 R. Carroll
- 1950-51 J. C. Dawson
- 1951-52 E. Connellan
- 1952-53 C. V. Crowley
- 1953-54 T. D. McNally
- 1954-55 L. M. Lynch
- 1955-56 J. P. D. Morris
- 1956-57 P. J. Berkeley
- 1957-58 A. Twomey
- 1958-59 M. A. L. Taney
- 1959-60 S. Kelly
- 1960-61 B. G. M. Wood
- 1961-62 N. Feddis
- 1962-63 B. G. M. Wood
- 1963-64 Dr. M. D. Kiely
- 1964-65 Caleb Powell
- 1965-66 A. Twomey
- 1966-67 A. T. A. Duggan
- 1967-68 P. J. Casey
- 1968-69 Noel Dwyer
- 1969-70 Dr. J. Craig
- 1970-71 P. Sutherland
- 1971-72 Dr. E. Kiely
- 1972-73 J. Mitchell
- 1973-74 D. Power
- 1974-75 J. Flanagan
- 1975-76 P. Inglis
- 1976-77 D. Caniffe
- 1977-78 P. Gahan
- 1978-79 Dick Spring
- 1979-80 P. Boylan
- 1980-81 Moss Keane
- 1981-82 Mick Quinn
- 1982-83 Michael Gibson
- 1983-84 V. Becker
- 1984-85 Donal Spring
- 1985-86 M. Ryan
- 1986-87 W. Burns
- 1987-88 P. Collins
- 1988-89 G. Dilger
- 1989-90 V. Ryan
- 1990-91 P. Clinch
- 1991-92 W. Burns
- 1992-93 Fergus Aherne
- 1993-94 Johnny Sexton
- 1994-95 Fergus Aherne
- 1995-96 B. Glennon
- 1996-97 M. McDermott
- 1997-98 Kurt McQuilkin
- 1998-99 Kurt McQuilkin
- 1999-2000 D. O’Mahony
- 2000-01 Colin McEntee
- 2001-02 S. Rooney
- 2002-03 E. Bohan
- 2003-04 E. Bohan
- 2004-05 Liam Toland (Resigned) S. O'Connor
- 2005-06 G. Quinn
- 2006-07 D. Lavin
- 2007-08 A. Maher
- 2008-09 A. Maher
- 2009-10 J. Lyne
- 2010-11 J. Lyne
- 2011-12 R. McCarron
- 2012-13 R. McCarron
- 2013-14 W. Earle
- 2014-15 R. Boucher
- 2015-16 Scott Deasy
- 2016-17 I. Prendiville
- 2017-18 I. Prendiville
- 2018-19 E. Mills
- 2019-20 J. Dwan
- 2020-21 J. Dwan
- 2021-22 J. O’Sullivan
- 2022-23 J. O’Sullivan
- 2023-24 C. Redmond
- 2025-26 A. Marks
- 2026-27 B. Sheehan

== Presidents ==
- 1872-04 H. W. D. Dunlop
- 1904-05 J. Sibtdorpe
- 1905-06 J. B. Moore
- 1906-07 H. Moore
- 1907-08 W. Pigot
- 1908-09 J. Denning
- 1909-10 R. G. Warren
- 1910-11 F. W. Kidd
- 1911-12 R. W. Jeffares Snr.
- 1912-13 A. M. Toomey
- 1913-14 J. Chambers
- 1914-19 F. Denning
- 1919-20 A. A. Brunker
- 1920-21 F. Joynt
- 1921-22 F. Joynt
- 1922-23 B. R. Doran
- 1923-24 J. J. Coffey
- 1924-25 J. J. Warren
- 1925-26 R. Simmons
- 1926-27 J. A. Gardan
- 1927-28 A. C. Sibtdorpe
- 1928-29 M Dawson
- 1929-30 M. J. D’Alton
- 1930-31 C. J. Law
- 1931-32 F. E. Davies
- 1932-33 V. C. Le Fanu
- 1933-34 F. A. Ross
- 1934-35 V. V. Drennan
- 1935-36 R. H. Lambert
- 1936-37 R. Donnelly
- 1937-38 N. M. Purcell
- 1938-39 F. W. Warren
- 1939-40 W. E. Crawford
- 1940-41 W. E. Crawford
- 1941-42 J. A. Cooke
- 1942-43 A. H. Robinson
- 1943-44 W. J. Young
- 1944-45 R. H. Maunsell
- 1945-46 R. W. Jeffares Jr.
- 1946-47 L. B. Heaney
- 1947-48 A. J. Beatty
- 1948-49 R. Noel Mitchell
- 1949-50 Michael J. Dunne
- 1950-51 F. C. Conroy
- 1951-52 E. J. Lightfoot
- 1952-53 Lt. Col. J. J. Burke-Gaffney, M C.
- 1953-54 T. A. O’Reilly
- 1954-55 E. O’D. Davy
- 1955-56 J. Bell
- 1956-57 Dr. M. P. Crowe
- 1957-58 T. C. Fox
- 1958-59 E. W. Garland
- 1959-60 H. W. Jack OBE. D.Sc.
- 1960-61 C. S. P. Randel
- 1961-62 N.H. Lambert
- 1962-63 G. P. S. Hogan B. L.
- 1963-64 Major-Gen S. Collins Powell
- 1964-65 W. G. Sutherland
- 1965-66 J. E. McEnery
- 1966-67 C. J. Murphy
- 1967-68 J. N. Garland
- 1968-69 R. Mitchell
- 1969-70 T. C. Byrne
- 1970-71 T. V. Davy, S.C.
- 1971-72 Rev. W. J. Moynan
- 1972-73 J. F. Coffey
- 1973-74 A. W. Campbell
- 1974-75 H. Vard
- 1975-76 J. C. Dawson
- 1976-77 P. J. Berkery
- 1977-78 J. P. Barrett
- 1978-79 A. McNally
- 1979-80 A. Twomey
- 1980-81 R. Carroll
- 1981-82 L. Lynch
- 1982-83 S. MacHale
- 1983-84 P. Moorhead
- 1984-85 K. Kelleher
- 1985-86 N. Hayden
- 1986-87 Dr. J. Craig
- 1987-88 J. Maguire
- 1988-89 P. Ward
- 1989-90 M. English
- 1990-91 P. J. Casey
- 1991-92 C. Flanagan
- 1992-93 L. McSherry
- 1993-94 C. Powell
- 1994-95 R. J. Mitchell
- 1995-96 B. J. McGann
- 1996-97 P. Inglis
- 1997-98 P. Van Cauwelaert
- 1998-99 A. T. A. Duggan
- 1999-00 Michael Kearney
- 2000-01 J. Flanagan
- 2001-02 J. A. Leddin
- 2002-03 P. Gahan
- 2003-04 F. Forrest
- 2004-05 B. Sparks
- 2005-06 O. O Buachalla
- 2006-07 A. Delany
- 2007-08 P. Halpenny
- 2008-09 J. Kearney
- 2009-10 Mark Dawson
- 2010-11 C. O'Reilly
- 2011-12 P. Boylan
- 2012-13 D. McCarron
- 2013-14 M. A. M. Quinn
- 2014-15 F. Kenny
- 2015-16 D. Lennon
- 2016-17 S. Coyle
- 2017-18 M. Cassidy
- 2018-19 K. Mulligan
- 2019-20 D. Shaw
- 2020-21 C. Goode
- 2021-22 C. Goode
- 2022-23 Mick Dawson
- 2023-24 Steve Rooney
- 2023-24 C. Shaw
- 2025-26 G. Lee
- 2026-27 Graham Quinn
