= Jack Arigho =

Irish rugby union player

John Edward Arigho (July 10, 1907 – November 29, 1999) was an international rugby union player for Ireland. He played 16 caps between 1928–1931 and scored 6 international tries playing on the wing. He also played for Lansdowne Football Club.
