= Shane Whelan =

Australian rules footballer

Personal information
- Full name: Shane Whelan
- Born: 15 June 1946 (age 80)
- Original team: Mornington
- Height: 188 cm (6 ft 2 in)
- Weight: 80.5 kg (177 lb)

Playing career^{1}
Years	Club	Games (Goals)
1967–69	Collingwood	20 (22)
- ^{1} Playing statistics correct to the end of 1969.

Shane Whelan is a former Australian rules footballer who played with Collingwood in the Victorian Football League (VFL).
