= Kevin Corrigan (rugby union) =

Rugby union player

- Height: 1.8 m (5 ft 11 in)
- Occupation: Professional rugby player

Rugby union career
- Position: Hooker
Amateur team(s)
Years	Team	Apps	(Points)
- Lansdowne FC
Senior career
Years	Team	Apps	(Points)
2007–2008	Rotherham Titans		
- Esher RFC
2008–2009	Harlequin F.C.		
2009–2011	Esher RFC		

Kevin Corrigan is a professional rugby union player for Esher. His current position is at Hooker.

Corrigan played for Esher RFC before joining Harlequins. Prior to that he played for the Rotherham Titans and Lansdowne FC. He also played for an Irish league XV the AIB club International in the 2007.
