= C.B.C. Monkstown =

Private Catholic school in County Dublin, Ireland

Christian Brothers College, Monkstown Park

Location
- Monkstown; Dún Laoghaire, County Dublin; Ireland; 53.2899°N 6.1485°W

Information
- Type: Private
- Motto: Latin: Certam Bonum Certamen (Fight the Good Fight)
- Religious affiliation: Catholic
- Established: 1856
- Sister school: Christian Brothers College, Cork
- Chairman: Gerry Horkan
- Principal: Gerry Duffy (Senior School)
- Principal: Lisa Kenny (Junior School)
- Staff: 40 Teachers, 10 Ancillary (Senior); 8 Teachers, 8 Support (Junior)
- Gender: Male
- Age range: 5–18
- Enrollment: 525 (Senior School); 200 (Junior School)
- Colours: Red, yellow and black
- Sports: Rugby, athletics
- Religious Order: Christian Brothers
- Website: www.cbcmonkstown.ie

Christian Brothers College, Monkstown Park (or CBC Monkstown Park) is a private fee-paying Catholic school and Independent Junior school, founded in 1856 in Monkstown, County Dublin, Ireland. The college arrived at Monkstown Park in 1950 from Eblana Avenue in Dún Laoghaire via a short stint on Tivoli Road. As of September 2022, it was in its 73rd academic year of existence at Monkstown Park, the 165th overall.

The intended mission of the college's former patron, the Congregation of the Christian Brothers established in 1802 by Edmund Ignatius Rice, was the education of poor boys in Ireland by providing them with basic levels of literacy. This was the broad aim of the school when it opened its doors in 1856 at Eblana Avenue in what was then known as Kingstown (now Dún Laoghaire), a port town south of Dublin.

As the years went by, the aims of the Christian Brothers got broader and so did those of the Dún Laoghaire school. By the 1920s, the school was preparing boys for the state examinations and sending increasing number of students to third level. The growth in population in Dún Laoghaire, with an increasing Catholic middle class demographic, led to an increase in the demand for the school. To that end, a decision was made to procure Monkstown Park in 1949 and to move the entire secondary department to this location. The school then in effect split, with the secondary department (now known as CBC Monkstown) moving location while the primary school (known as C.B.S. Eblana Avenue) remained at the original site. A private junior school was then opened at the Monkstown College with Eblana Avenue taking secondary students again from 1954.

The ethos of the majority of Christian Brothers schools in Ireland in the early 20th century was a strongly nationalist and Gaelic one. Those schools were known as "CBS" and played Gaelic games. However the Monkstown school, in line with their sister establishment, Christians (CBC Cork), was known as "CBC" and played rugby union as the main team game. Continuing with that differentiation, both schools would be the only 2 of the 96 Christian Brothers schools to abstain from the Free Education Act 1967, which for the first time provided free second-level education for Irish pupils. Both remained in the fee paying sector as of 2017.

The school motto is Certa Bonum Certamen or "fight the good fight" and the school colours are red, black and yellow.

== History ==
St Michaels Christian Brothers School Eblana Avenue, original incarnation of CBC. Continued use as the location of CBS Eblana until its closure in 1992

On 1 January 1856, the Congregation of Christian Brothers opened a school at Eblana Avenue in Dún Laoghaire, or 'Kingstown' as it was then known. The site was provided by Charles Kennedy, a businessman and head of the local Vincent DePaul.

This was just ten years after the Great Famine, and emigration was rife. The school was called St Michaels Christian Brothers School, and initially educated mainly poor boys from the area. Brother Alphonsus Hoope was appointed as superior of the school. Kingstown during the 19th century was rapidly expanding with the harbour town seeing the addition of the piers and the Dublin and Kingstown Railway opening 20 years before the school.

Hoope arranged for two rooms for teaching, which had to be expanded after three weeks to three due to demand. Within two years, a building housing 400 students was built on the site. Kennedy and the local Vincent DePaul raised funds for the school at a gala dinner at what is now the Royal Marine Hotel Dún Laoghaire. The day-to-day operations of the school was financed from "voluntary subscriptions, solicited and collected by the Brothers". The Brothers residence of the time was located behind the main school building. There were 6 Brothers living on the school grounds, a building separate from the main school block. The school premises was valued in 1859 at £60.

During World War I, a significant number of former pupils of the school went to fight in the war, as part of the 200,000 Irishmen who participated in the war effort. The Dún Laoghaire area suffered over 500 military fatalities during the war, with a significant number of these coming from school. Owing to this, people in Flanders sent a statue to the area to honour the dead. It was felt at the time that the school should take it, as so many of the fatalities were from the school. With the changing political environment at the time however, with the Irish War of Independence underway, this was declined by the school. The statue was instead housed in the Dominican Convent in the town, where it resides still to this day in an oratory purposely designed for it.

The Brothers continued to have a major role in the education system when Ireland gained independence. In 1925 they vacated their premises in the school, moving to the nearby York Road, creating additional space for the school. By this time the school was focusing more on its collegiate department, with increased local competition in the area and a demand for Inter Certificate and Leaving Certificate programmes growing as a new middle class sprang up in Dún Laoghaire. Early pupils at the collegiate wing of the school included Dan O'Herlihy and James Dooge.

The school at Eblana prospered to an extent that it became impossible to accommodate both primary and secondary departments in the 19th century buildings, with the Dún Laoghaire parish hall often used to hold classes. Additionally, the Dún Laoghaire site was an urban one, with no greenspace on the site. This was felt to hinder the college against other local schools who could provide on site sports to their students, facilities which the growing middle class demographic of the area expected. A new site was therefore sought for part of the school.

=== Move to Monkstown Park ===
The Brothers sought a site for the new part of the school. Traditions were soon adopted from CBC Cork which had been existence since the early 20th century. In 1949 the Brothers purchased the nearby 22-acre (89,000 m^{2}) estate of Monkstown Park, which had been most recently occupied by the Protestant Corrig School. In order to procure the grounds, the Brothers released lands at Rochestown Avenue to Dún Laoghaire Corporation which had previously been used as the schools playing pitches. Many local people wanted a public park to be maintained at the site.

CBC abstained from joining the Free Education Scheme introduced by Donagh O'Malley in 1969. The primary reason for not joining the scheme was the significant capital costs involved in maintaining a school the size of CBC. CBC had always charged higher fees than their equivalent Christian Brothers schools. To this day, it remains as one of the 51 secondary schools (7% of the total) in the country that is fee paying.

In 1987 the school was further extended with a new administration building including new offices, a cafeteria, staff room and technology department. In 1994, the Edmund Rice Oratory, was opened.

=== 50 years at Monkstown Park and school redevelopment ===
In 2000 the college celebrated its Golden Jubilee at Monkstown Park. The school year began with a ceremonial walk from the old Eblana school site to Monkstown Park. Events included a Jubilee Concert and the opening of a wall with the names of all the pupils from the time in Monkstown from 1950 onwards, attended by the President of Ireland, Mary McAleese.

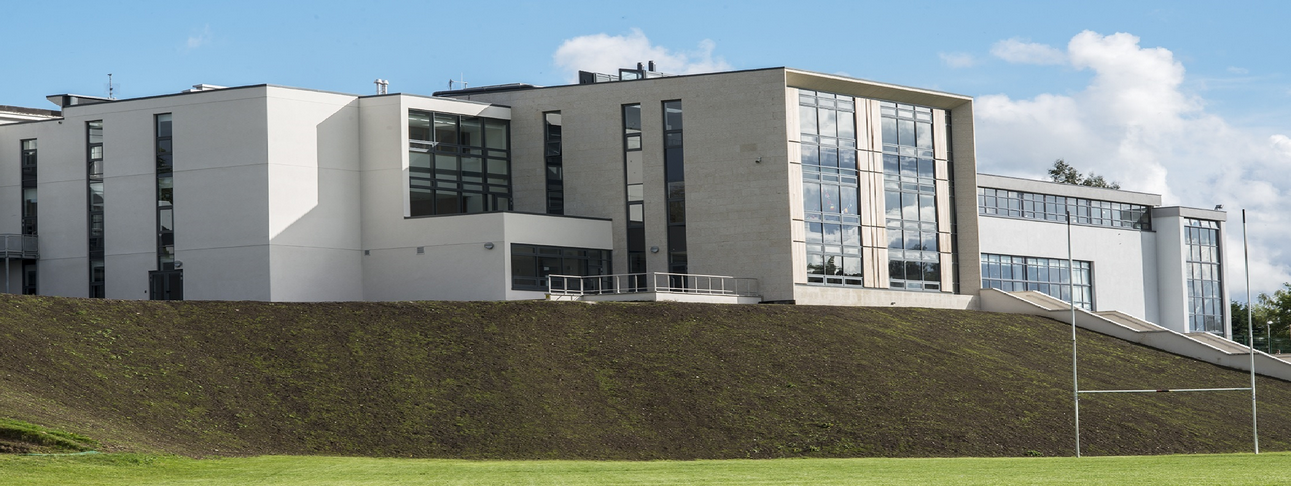
Modern day school buildings with rugby pitches in foreground

In 2002 plans for a new school on the site were announced. Considerable controversy was caused in 2005 in the national media when it was announced, as CBC would receive a portion of the costs of funding the building despite being a fee-paying school from the Irish state. Subsequently, the school proceeded with the project with their own finance.

In 2007 the Christian Brothers decided to transfer the trusteeship of the school to the Edmund Rice Schools Trust along with 96 other Christian Brothers schools.

A new 12 classroom building opened in 2014. This stands alongside the refurbished original 1840s building, the 1965 Sports Hall and the 1987 Administration Block.

== Motto and crest ==
The college motto is "Certa Bonum Certamen", Latin for "Fight the Good Fight". This is written at the top of the original building which is visible on entry to the grounds. All school announcements used to conclude with the motto.

The college crest contains four elements. The college motto is below a shield containing three characters – a star, a tower and a sword. The star is the guiding star of knowledge. The tower represents the tower on the school grounds and the Christian focus of the school. The sword represents power, courage and chivalry.

== Buildings ==
The college is bordered by several historical sites. Carrickbrennan Churchyard is located to the north of the school on the border of the grounds and Monkstown Castle is adjacent to the school. The college is made up of three buildings interconnected. Charles Haliday's house built in 1843 is incorporated into the main school block. The facade of the building long portico of Corinthians columns remains intact and is a protected structure. The tower opposite the main building is also a protected structure. The administrative block was built in 1987 and also contains several classrooms. The concert hall was built in the early 1960s.

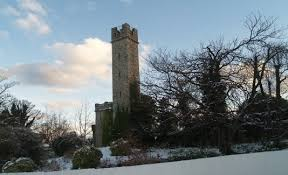
Charles Haliday's Tower Folly, on the east of CBC Monkstown's grounds

The grounds contain an athletics paddock and three rugby pitches.

== Academic and spiritual ==
=== Academic performance ===
The average Leaving Cert score in CBC in 2019 was 461, this compares to the national average of 335.

In 2013 over 70% of CBC students achieved over 400 points in the Leaving Certificate, nationally the number achieving this was 33.7%. In addition (results nationally in brackets); 27% in CBC (3%) got over 550 points, 41% (9.4%) in CBC got over 500 points and 57% got over 450 points (20.1%).

In 2014, one CBC student achieved eight A1 grades, putting him in the top 13 performers in the country

In 2018, one CBC student received 8 H1 results, one of seven students in Ireland to achieve this.

=== Senior school curriculum ===
Part of the schools mission statement is striving for "academic excellence". Boys study for both the Junior Cert and later the Irish Leaving Cert. School hours are between 8:45 am to 4 pm with a half day for sporting activities on Wednesdays at 1 pm. In addition sports activities sometimes take place after 4 pm and optional afternoon and night study is available.

The fourth year (transition year) includes courses in academic subjects, as well as such optional subjects and activities as: Japanese, Sailing, Social work, Tourism, Chess-Boxing and First aid. The Comenius project is also offered which is a project linking CBC with other schools around Europe. Transition Year classes won the Comórtas Scannán TG4 in 2005 and were finalists in 2006, the 2005 group having their film represent Ireland in Italy in 2005.

Aside from the core languages of English and Irish; Latin, Japanese, French and German are taught. In addition to business studies for the junior cert, economics, business and accounting are offered for the leaving cert. Mathematics and applied mathematics are taught. Physics, chemistry and biology are offered as science subjects. Civics, geography, history, technical drawing, art, music, computers and home economics are also offered.

In the 2004 Sunday Times Schools League Table, CBC was listed among the country's top twenty schools, while in the Irish Times tables in 2006, the school was the top all-boys school in Ireland (3rd overall).

=== Monkstown Park Junior School ===
The Junior School consists of around 100 boys & Girls. There are 8 full-time teachers and one principal. Extra-curricular subjects are also taught such as Computers, French, Physical Education, Speech and Drama, Singing and Musical Appreciation and Arts and Crafts. There is also a part-time remedial teacher. Tutors are available to take students studying German and Music and the school runs an activity club on Fridays.

As an Independent school, it operates outside the auspices of the Department of Education, which does not control school hours, curriculum and activities.

In 2014 the school became an associate member of the Edmund Rice Schools Trust network. Under new directors, the school was re-established as Monkstown Park Junior School in July 2014.

=== Spiritual ===
Although the Christian Brothers have departed the faculty, Religious Education is still taught. It is offered for the Junior and Leaving Certificates (as an optional subject). Religion is also taken for those who do not choose to learn it as an exam subject in the Senior Cycle.

The Edmund Rice Oratory is one of the school's latest additions. A school chaplain is available to the college.

== Extracurricular ==
=== Aid work ===
The Zambian Immersion Project is a senior cycle project where pupils fund raise and travel to Zambia and help in charity work. Others complete An Gaisce (Presidents Award) and the Edmund Rice awards which contain significant social work.

The Junior School's 6th class raise money annually for the Chernobyl Children's Project (with their charity Children Helping Children), and culminate their fund raising in a business exhibition at the end of every year. In 2007 they raised €42,000 for the project. In 2008 the school started a new charity: the Edmund Rice's Children's Fund. This encourages a whole school approach.

=== Drama, college musical and music ===
CBC has the distinction of being the first school to ever perform in the national Theatre of Ireland, the Abbey Theatre in 1958. Class V performed Patrick Pearse's Íosagán under the directorship of Thomas MacAnna, a future Tony Award winner, who was the drama and elocution teacher in the school at the time. MacAnna also produced the early Gilbert and Sullivan opera performances at the school.

The annual school musical, a collaboration with the nearby girls school Loreto College, Foxrock has been running for 21 years. Each respective transition year pupils participate, providing the student wishes to participate.

A fifth-year drama is also produced.

=== Writing workshops ===
In 2015, CBC Transition Year's wrote and published a short story book, Brainstorms edited by writer Roddy Doyle. This was as part of Doyle's Fighting Words programme. Author Kevin Barry wrote the introduction.

=== Debating ===
In 2011, CBC became the first school in the history of Leinster Schools' Debating Championships to win both the Individual and Team prizes, thus the school were Leinster's sole representatives at the All Ireland Schools' Debating Championship (Individual: Austin Conlon, Team: Kevin Dooney and Michael Barton). Conlon went on to win the Individual prize at the All Ireland Schools' Debating Championship at University College Cork whilst the Team of Dooney and Barton finished as runners up. Another team from CBC, Stephen Stack and Hugh Guidera, also represented Ireland at the Schools debating competition organised by the Oxford Union at Oxford University.

Rory Conlon and Luke Murray retained the Leinster School's Debating team title in 2012 for the school. Hugh Guidera and Michael Barton reached the Grand Final of the Clifford Chance Durham University Schools' Debating Competition, one of the four "Majors" on the UK Schools Debating circuit and is the largest schools debating competition in the world. This made them the only Irish school to reach one of the UK Majors for this debating season. In addition, Stephen Stack and Michael Barton triumphed at the Trinity College Dublin Schools' Debating Competition.

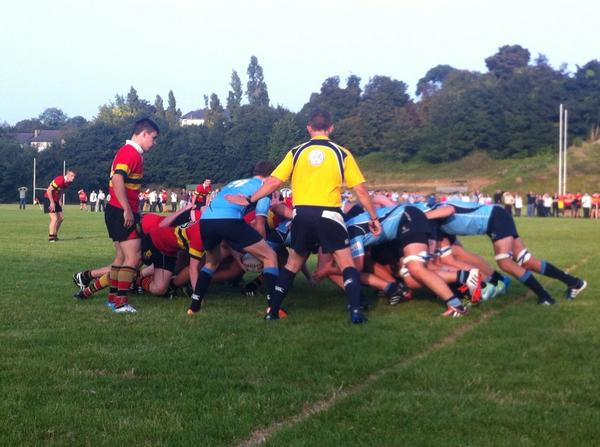
A rugby match at Monkstown Park, September 2014

The school has hosted the Irish Schools Debating team during the World Schools Debating Championships during the COVID-19 pandemic making these virtual events, with CBC students on the Irish team.

In 2023 a CBC student became the first Irish student to win both the Oxford University and Cambridge University schools debating championships, the two largest schools debating competitions in the world.

=== Rugby ===
From the beginning, Rugby Union has been the main competitive team sport of the school. Rugby was played at the old Monkstown Park School (Corrig School) who won the Leinster Schools Rugby Senior Cup in 1889 and 1892. The school's rugby team initially was CBC Dún Laoighaire before the move to the new school in Monkstown. CBC Monkstown won the Leinster Schools Rugby Senior Cup in 1976 and reached the final in 1984. The school won the League Cup at Junior Level in 1998 and 2004, reaching the final in 1997/98, 2000/01, 2007/08, 2008/09, 2010/2011 and 2011/2012. The Senior Cup team played in the Senior league final in 2001, 2003, and 2008, winning the latter. The Senior Cup team have played in the Vincent Murray Cup on five occasions; they won in 2003, 2005 and 2007 whilst losing the final in 2006 and 2010. CBC also won the Powerade Leinster 'School of the Year' award in 2008.

CBC has produced a number of provincial and international rugby players including Paddy O'Donoghue, Patrick Casey, Joseph Brady and Barry O'Connor. Other rugby figures include the former President of the IRFU, John Lyons and the former international referee Donal Courtney. Past pupils Neil Walsh (Ulster Rugby) and Michael Noone play professionally currently.

In 2008 the school undertook a tour of Argentina and Uruguay playing games against a number of teams including Newman Club, a Christian Brothers school in Buenos Aires. Previous tours include Australia in 2001 and South Africa in 2005.

CBC students in Donnybrook Stadium during the 2008 Leinster Schools Rugby Senior Cup

Rugby Honours

- Leinster Schools Rugby Senior Cup – *1889, *1892, 1976 (Runners Up: 1984(* As Corrig School))
- Leinster Schools Rugby Senior League – 2008 (Runners Up: 2002, 2004)
- Leinster Schools Vinnie Murray Cup – 2003, 2005, 2007, 2017 (Runners Up: 2006, 2010)
- Leinster Schools Senior Thirds League – 1995 (Runners Up: 2008)
- Leinster Schools Senior Fourths League – 1991, 1993 (Runners Up: 2006, 2013)
- All Ireland Schools Sevens – 1982
- Leinster Schools Rugby Junior League – 1998, 2005, 2012 (Runners up: 1997, 2001, 2007, 2008, 2010, 2011, 2015)
- Powerarde Leinster Rugby School of the Year – 2008

=== Athletics ===
The school is also involved in athletics and Cross Country competitions. The school consistently produces medalists at All Ireland, Leinster, East Leinster and Edmund Rice Games level, both individual and at team level. The school has an athletics pavilion with a triple and high jump track, a pole vault track, a discus facility and a hammer net.

Major Team Athletics Honours

- All Ireland College of Science Cup (Top Overall school in Ireland) – 1978
- Leinster Schools' Athletics Senior Shield Winners (Top Overall School) – 1976, 1977, 1978, 1994
- All Ireland President's Shield (Second ranked school in Ireland) – 1955, 2007

=== Other sports ===
Other sports taken include golf, swimming, tennis, sailing, orienteering, and squash.

Golf is played in Leopardstown Golf Course and the school enters teams every year at provincial level.

There are two tennis courts, neither of which have nets or chalk outlines, and the school has used Monkstown Tennis Club opposite the school. The school tennis team reached the semifinals of the Leinster Championships in 2009.

Swimming is undertaken at Blue Pool leisure center, Monkstown.

The school uses the facilities at Dún Laoghaire for sailing which is a part of the Transition year programme. The school came third in the Leinster Schools Sailing Championships in 2009.

=== Cricket ===
An effort in start a cricket team in Monkstown in the early 1950s proved to be difficult. The efforts to start a cricket team was chronicled on the March 27 edition of RTÉ's Sunday Miscellany as "Cricket in the Borough" by past pupil Louis Brennan. A revival of the sport within the school occurred in 2002 when a team was formed playing 3 games against Mount Anville, King's Hospital and Blackrock College.

CBC Monkstown Annual 2003 Cover

== Notable alumni ==
The Past Pupils Union of the Christian Brothers College, Monkstown and Dún Laoghaire has been active since the mid-1950s. The CBC Monkstown PPU hosts several annual events.

Notable past pupils from the Dún Laoghaire and Monkstown schools include:

Arts and entertainment

- Ronnie Drew, musician, founded The Dubliners
- Dan O'Herlihy, Academy Award for Best Actor nominee at 27th Academy Awards for Robinson Crusoe
- James Flynn, Academy Award for Best Live Action Short Film nominee at 82nd Academy Awards for The Door
- Jonathan Redmond, Academy Award for Best Film Editing nominee at 95th Academy Awards for Elvis (2022 film)
- Vincent Dowling, stage and television director
- Jonathan Ryan, actor
- Danny Ryan, Lead Guitarist with The Thrills
- Dave Hingerty, former drummer with The Frames
- Bernard Farrell, playwright and television dramatist
- Jim Nugent, Irish national radio RTÉ 2fm and RTÉ television presenter (The Colm & Jim-Jim Breakfast Show)
- Dermot O'Neill, gardener and broadcaster
- Tomás Mac Anna, Tony Award winning Abbey Theatre director
- John Keogh Singer and Pianist with The Greenbeats and Full Circle
- Robbie Brennan former drummer with The Chosen Few, Skid Row, Thin Lizzie, Stepaside

Religion and humanitarianism

- Kevin Doran, Bishop of Elphin
- John O'Shea, founder and CEO of international humanitarian organization GOAL
- Fr. Shay Cullen, founder of the Preda Foundation

Sport

- Patrick Casey, former Irish rugby international
- Eoghan Clarke, hooker with Saracens Rugby
- Noel Feddis, former Irish rugby international
- Joe Brady (rugby union), former Irish rugby international
- Paddy O'Donoghue, former Irish International, former Treasurer of the IRFU
- Peter McKenna, former Irish Rugby International
- Michael Noone – former Leicester Tigers number 8
- Donal Courtney, former International Rugby Board referee
- John Feehan, former Leinster player and current CEO of the Six Nations Championship, the British and Irish Lions and the Pro12
- Brian Kavanagh, CEO of Horse Racing Ireland
- Michael Fitzsimons, 9 time (joint record) All-Ireland Senior Football Championship winner for the Dublin GAA Gaelic football team
- Andy Keogh, Republic of Ireland soccer international
- Peter Farrell, captain of Everton F.C. (1948–1957) and won a total of 35 caps for Ireland for the FAI XI and IFA XI in soccer
- James Furlong, English Premier League player with Brighton & Hove Albion F.C.
- Jordan Devlin, better known as JD McDonagh, professional wrestler with the WWE

Politics, legal and diplomats

- Seán Barrett, Fine Gael Teachta Dála (TD), Ceann Comhairle of Dáil Éireann and former cabinet minister
- Professor James Dooge, former minister for foreign affairs, chairman of Seanad Éireann, noted scientist and chairman of the Dooge Committee (Single European Act)
- James B. Lynch, Fianna Fáil member of the Dáil and Senator.
- Seamus Costello, assassinated Republican Socialist who founded the Irish National Liberation Army
- Niall McCarthy, former Judge of the Irish Supreme Court
- Cahir Davitt, former President of the High Court
- Michael Quinn, High Court Judge of Ireland

Business

- Peter Bellew, CEO of Malaysia Airlines
- Frank McCabe, former Vice President of Intel Corporation and Managing Director of Intel Ireland's operations

Academia and journalistic

- Tim Pat Coogan, former editor of the Irish Press and historian
- Shane Kenny, journalist and broadcaster
- John Ryan, publisher, editor of Magill, war correspondent
- Emmet Malone, soccer correspondent with The Irish Times
- Hugh Cahill, RTÉ Sport rugby commentator
- Stephen Kinsella, Economist
- Professor Ronan Fanning, professor emeritus of Modern History at University College Dublin

== In popular culture ==
CBC has been referenced in the popular satire of "South Dublin culture", the book series Ross O'Carroll Kelly. In Ross O'Carroll-Kelly's Guide to (South) Dublin: How To Get By On, Like, €10,000 A Day, the school is given a section in the book which slates the school's rugby performances but notes the success of debating in the school and the popularity of Irish names. Past pupil Rory Nolan plays the character in the stage production.

The school is also referenced in Sarah Webb's "Shoestring Club" book released in 2012.

== See also ==
- CBS Eblana
