= 2023–24 Munster Rugby season =

- Ground(s): Thomond Park (Capacity: 25,600) (Note: Thomond Park's official capacity is 25,600 but can be expanded up to 26,276 with temporary seating.); Musgrave Park (Capacity: 8,800)
- Chairman: Gerry O'Shea
- CEO: Ian Flanagan
- President: Michael Carroll
- Coach: Graham Rowntree
- Captain: Peter O'Mahony
- League: United Rugby Championship

The 2023–24 Munster Rugby season is Munster's twenty-third season competing in the United Rugby Championship, alongside which they are also competing in the European Rugby Champions Cup. It is Graham Rowntree's second season as head coach. Munster went into the season as the defending league champions, having defeated the Stormers in the final of the previous season.

== Events ==
Former Munster player Mossy Lawler returned to the province to join the coaching team as a skills coach, having spent the previous eight seasons coaching at Connacht. Academy manager Ian Costello was promoted to the newly created position of head of rugby operations, with Gearóid Prendergast, then-director of rugby at Young Munster, replacing him in the role. Lead performance analyst George Murray continues on in his role as technical coach after taking up the role in June 2022.

In players news, two players were promoted from the academy to the senior squad: back-three Patrick Campbell and lock/back-row Cian Hurley. Prop John Ryan returned to the province, whilst Alex Nankivell, who was Ryan's teammate at the Chiefs, also joined the province. Former Connacht centre Seán O'Brien joined the province from English club Exeter Chiefs. Five players joined year one of the Munster academy ahead of the season: prop George Hadden, back-row Brian Gleeson, fly-half Dylan Hicks and back-three players Shay McCarthy and Ben O'Connor.

Fly-half Ben Healy, who won his first cap for Scotland during the 2023 Six Nations, left the province to join Edinburgh, whilst centre Malakai Fekitoa also left to join Italian club Benetton. Lock Paddy Kelly and prop Liam O'Connor were forced to retire upon the conclusion of the previous season due to respective brain and neck injuries, centre Oli Morris and academy back-three Conor Phillips were released by the province, and lock Eoin O'Connor joined English club Exeter Chiefs Club legend Keith Earls, who was contracted until the end of the 2023 Rugby World Cup, confirmed his retirement upon Ireland's exit from the tournament, bringing to an end his 16-year Munster career.

The format for the European Rugby Champions Cup changed for the 2023–24 season, with the two pool-format used during the COVID-19 pandemic dispensed with in favour of four pools of six clubs each, with each pool containing two teams from the United Rugby Championship, Top 14 and Premiership Rugby. The four highest-ranked teams in each pool progress to the knockout stage. Munster were in tier one for the pool draw by virtue of being 2022–23 URC champions, and were drawn in pool 3, where they will face English clubs Exeter Chiefs and Northampton Saints, and French clubs Bayonne and Toulon.

In a world first, Munster will host Super Rugby champions the Crusaders in a so-called Clash of Champions on 3 February 2024, a match that will see former Munster head coach Rob Penney return to the province after he was appointed as Crusaders new head coach ahead of 2024.

Greig Oliver, an elite player development officer with Munster's academy since 2011, died in a paragliding accident in Cape Town, South Africa, on 3 July 2023, where he and his wife were following their son Jack, who is in Munster's academy, with the Ireland under-20s team at the 2023 World Rugby U20 Championship.

Munster began their pre-season fixtures with a 33–12 home defeat against Leinster at Musgrave Park on 8 September and a 24–19 away win against Connacht at the Sportsground on 22 September, before defeating famous invitational touring side the Barbarians 47–35 at Thomond Park on 30 September; this match was the first time the sides' respective men's team faced each other.

== Player movements ==
Below are the players who joined and left the Munster senior and academy squads ahead of the 2023–24 season. Italics indicates players that transferred during the 2023–24 season.

=== Senior squad ===
Players in

- (Ireland) Patrick Campbell promoted from Academy
- (Ireland) John Ryan from (New Zealand) Chiefs
- (New Zealand) Alex Nankivell from (New Zealand) Chiefs
- (Ireland) Cian Hurley promoted from Academy
- (Ireland) Seán O'Brien from (England) Exeter Chiefs

Players out

- (Scotland) Ben Healy to (Scotland) Edinburgh
- (Tonga) Malakai Fekitoa to (Italy) Benetton
- (Ireland) Paddy Kelly retired
- (Ireland) Liam O'Connor retired
- (England) Oli Morris released
- (Ireland) Eoin O'Connor to (England) Exeter Chiefs
- (Ireland) Keith Earls retired

=== Academy squad ===
Players in

- (Ireland) Brian Gleeson
- (Ireland) George Hadden
- (Ireland) Dylan Hicks
- (Ireland) Shay McCarthy
- (Ireland) Ben O'Connor

Players out

- (Ireland) Conor Phillips released

== Coaches and staff ==
Senior squad

Position	Name	Nationality
Head coach	Graham Rowntree	England
Attack coach	Mike Prendergast	Ireland
Forwards coach	Andi Kyriacou	England
Defence coach	Denis Leamy	Ireland
Lead performance analyst and technical coach	George Murray	Ireland
Skills coach	Mossy Lawler	Ireland
Team manager	Niall O'Donovan	Ireland
Head of rugby operations	Ian Costello	Ireland
Head of athletic performance	Ged McNamara	Ireland
Strength and conditioning coach	Adam Sheehan	Ireland
Head of medical	Jamie Kearns	Ireland
Lead physiotherapist	Damien Mordan	Ireland
Physiotherapist	Keith Thornhill	Ireland
Physiotherapist	Ray McGinley	Ireland
Performance analyst	Paul O'Brien	Ireland

Academy squad

Position	Name
Academy and pathway manager	Gearóid Prendergast
Elite player development officer	Brendan O'Connor
Elite player development officer	Tommy O'Donnell
Pathway development coach	Matt Brown
Lead academy athletic development coach	Danielle Cunningham
Academy and pathway performance analyst	Brandon Shanahan

== Players ==
=== Senior squad ===
Munster Rugby senior squad
**Props**: (Ireland) **Stephen Archer**; (Ireland) **Dave Kilcoyne**; (South Africa) Keynan Knox*; (Ireland) **Jeremy Loughman**; (Ireland) **John Ryan**; (Ireland) Roman Salanoa; (Ireland) Josh Wycherley; **Hookers**: (Ireland) Diarmuid Barron; (Ireland) Scott Buckley; (England) Chris Moore*; (Ireland) **Niall Scannell**; **Locks**: (Ireland) Thomas Ahern; (Ireland) **Tadhg Beirne**; (Ireland) Cian Hurley; (South Africa) **Jean Kleyn** (Note: Kleyn changed his World Rugby-recognised international affiliation to South Africa in June 2023.); (South Africa) **RG Snyman**; (Ireland) **Fineen Wycherley**	**Back row**: (Ireland) **Gavin Coombes**; (Ireland) Jack Daly; (Ireland) John Hodnett; (Ireland) Alex Kendellen; (Ireland) **Jack O'Donoghue**; (Ireland) **Peter O'Mahony** (c); (Ireland) Jack O'Sullivan; **Scrum-halves**: (Ireland) **Craig Casey**; (Ireland) Neil Cronin; (Ireland) **Conor Murray**; (Ireland) Paddy Patterson; **Fly-halves**: (Ireland) **Joey Carbery**; (Ireland) **Jack Crowley**	**Centres**: (Ireland) Antoine Frisch; (New Zealand) Alex Nankivell; (Ireland) Seán O'Brien; (Ireland) **Rory Scannell**; **Back three**: (Ireland) **Andrew Conway**; (Ireland) Patrick Campbell; (Ireland) Liam Coombes; (Ireland) **Shane Daly**; (Ireland) **Mike Haley**; (Ireland) **Calvin Nash**; (Ireland) **Simon Zebo**
(c) denotes the team captain, **Bold** denotes internationally capped players.^{*} denotes players qualified to play for Ireland on residency or dual nationality.^{ST} denotes a short-term signing.^{L} denotes a player on loan at the club. Players and their allocated positions from the Munster Rugby website.

=== Academy squad ===
Munster Rugby academy squad
**Props**: (Ireland) Mark Donnelly **(3)**; (Ireland) George Hadden **(1)**; (Ireland) Darragh McSweeney **(2)**; (Ireland) Kieran Ryan **(2)**; **Hookers**: None at present; **Locks**: (Ireland) Edwin Edogbo **(3)**; (Ireland) Evan O'Connell **(2)**	**Back row**: (Ireland) Brian Gleeson **(1)**; (Ireland) Daniel Okeke **(3)**; (Ireland) Ruadhán Quinn **(2)**; **Scrum-halves**: (Ireland) Ethan Coughlan **(3)**; (Ireland) Jack Oliver **(2)**; **Fly-halves**: (Ireland) Tony Butler **(3)**; (Ireland) Dylan Hicks **(1)**	**Centres**: (Ireland) Fionn Gibbons **(2)**; **Back three**: (Ireland) Shay McCarthy **(1)**; (Ireland) Ben O'Connor **(1)**
**Bold** denotes internationally capped players, number in brackets indicates players stage in the three-year academy cycle.^{*} denotes players qualified to play for Ireland on residency or dual nationality. Players and their allocated positions from the Munster Rugby website.

== Pre-season and friendlies ==
8 September 2023
18:00

Munster (Ireland)	12–33	(Ireland) Leinster
	Report

Musgrave Park
Attendance: 8,400

22 September 2023
17:30

Connacht (Ireland)	19–24	(Ireland) Munster
	Report

The Sportsground

30 September 2023
16:30

Munster (Ireland)	52–35	Barbarians
	Report

Thomond Park
Attendance: 10,427

3 February 2024
17:00

Munster (Ireland)	21-19	(New Zealand) Crusaders
	Report

Páirc Uí Chaoimh
Attendance: 40,885
Referee: Chris Busby

23 February 2024
19:45

Harlequins (England)	35-43	(Ireland) Munster
	Report

Twickenham Stoop
Referee: Hamish Smales

== 2023–24 United Rugby Championship ==
2023–24 United Rugby Championship
	Team	P	W	D	L	PF	PA	PD	TF	TA	TB	LB	Pts
1	(Ireland) Munster	18	13	1	4	483	318	+165	65	38	11	3	68
2	(South Africa) Bulls (RU)	18	13	0	5	639	433	+206	85	54	11	3	66
3	(Ireland) Leinster	18	13	0	5	554	350	+204	81	43	11	2	65
4	(Scotland) Glasgow Warriors (CH)	18	13	0	5	519	353	+166	76	35	11	2	65
5	(South Africa) Stormers	18	12	0	6	468	348	+120	58	45	7	4	59
6	(Ireland) Ulster	18	11	0	7	437	409	+28	53	55	5	5	54
7	(Italy) Benetton	18	11	1	6	411	400	+11	51	56	6	2	54
8	(Wales) Ospreys	18	10	0	8	414	449	–35	53	53	8	2	50
9	(South Africa) Lions	18	9	0	9	526	398	+128	67	50	8	6	50
10	(Scotland) Edinburgh	18	11	0	7	416	397	+19	47	52	3	2	49
11	(Ireland) Connacht	18	9	0	9	404	432	–28	51	57	4	5	45
12	(Wales) Cardiff	18	4	1	13	384	410	–26	50	51	4	10	32
13	(Wales) Scarlets	18	5	0	13	313	575	–262	37	77	4	3	27
14	(South Africa) Sharks	18	4	0	14	343	431	–88	47	55	3	6	25
15	(Wales) Dragons	18	3	0	15	300	611	–311	36	84	1	3	16
16	(Italy) Zebre Parma	18	1	1	16	345	643	–298	42	94	4	5	15
If teams are level at any stage, tiebreakers are applied in the following order: 1. number of matches won; 2. the difference between points for and points against; 3. the number of tries scored; 4. the most points scored; 5. the difference between tries for and tries against; 6. the fewest red cards received; 7. the fewest yellow cards received.
Green background indicates teams that are in play-off places and earn a place in the 2024–25 European Champions Cup Pink background indicates teams that are in play-off places and earn a place in the 2024–25 European Challenge Cup; Yellow background indicates the team that won the 2023–24 European Challenge Cup and thus qualify for the 2024–25 European Champions Cup, but are not in a play-off place Plain background indicates teams that earn a place in the 2024–25 European Challenge Cup. Q: qualified for play-offs. H: home field advantage secured for quarter-and semi-final. h: home field advantage secured for quarter-final X: cannot reach play-offs. E: qualified for Champions Cup.

2023–24 United Rugby Championship Regional Shield Pools
(Ireland) Irish Shield
	Team	P	W	D	L	PF	PA	PD	TF	TA	TBP	LBP	Pts	Pos overall
1	(Ireland) Leinster	6	4	0	2	129	93	+36	18	10	2	2	20	3rd
2	(Ireland) Ulster	6	4	0	2	130	126	+4	14	18	0	2	18	6th
3	(Ireland) Munster	6	2	0	4	118	109	+9	14	11	2	3	13	1st
4	(Ireland) Connacht	6	2	0	4	104	153	–49	13	20	0	2	10	11th
(Scotland) (Italy) Scottish/Italian Shield
	Team	P	W	D	L	PF	PA	PD	TF	TA	TBP	LBP	Pts	Pos overall
1	(Scotland) Glasgow Warriors	6	5	0	1	159	85	+74	24	5	3	1	24	4th
2	(Italy) Benetton	6	4	0	2	143	111	+32	18	15	3	0	19	7th
3	(Scotland) Edinburgh	6	3	0	3	121	124	–3	15	16	1	1	14	10th
4	(Italy) Zebre Parma	6	0	0	6	106	209	–103	10	31	0	2	2	16th
(South Africa) South African Shield
	Team	P	W	D	L	PF	PA	PD	TF	TA	TBP	LBP	Pts	Pos overall
1	(South Africa) Bulls	6	5	0	1	185	110	+75	24	12	4	1	25	2nd
2	(South Africa) Stormers	6	5	0	1	153	153	0	17	19	2	0	22	5th
3	(South Africa) Lions	6	2	0	4	155	147	+8	19	18	2	3	13	9th
4	(South Africa) Sharks	6	0	0	6	88	171	–83	11	22	0	3	3	14th
(Wales) Welsh Shield
	Team	P	W	D	L	PF	PA	PD	TF	TA	TBP	LBP	Pts	Pos overall
1	(Wales) Ospreys	6	5	0	1	147	103	+44	21	10	4	0	24	8th
2	(Wales) Scarlets	6	3	0	3	124	132	–8	16	15	3	1	16	13th
3	(Wales) Cardiff	6	2	0	4	169	150	+19	21	21	2	4	14	12th
4	(Wales) Dragons	6	2	0	4	91	146	–55	9	21	0	1	9	15th
If teams are level at any stage, tiebreakers are applied in the following order: 1. number of matches won 2. the difference between points for and points against 3. the number of tries scored 4. the most points scored 5. the difference between tries for and tries against 6. the fewest red cards received 7. the fewest yellow cards received
Green background indicates teams currently leading the regional shield. Upon the conclusion of the regular season, these teams win their respective regional shields. (S) : URC Shield champion

=== Round 1 ===
21 October 2023
17:15

(1 BP) Munster (Ireland)	34–21	(South Africa) Sharks
Try: Edogbo 20'; Barron 25'; Frisch 40'; Conway 66'; Coughlan 77'; Con: Carbery (3) 21' 26' 41'; Pen: Carbery 44'	Report	Try: Kok 37'; Janse van Rensburg 47'; Fassi 81'; Con: Bosch (3) 38' 48' 81'

Thomond Park
Attendance: 11,239
Referee: Gianluca Gnecchi

=== Round 2 ===
29 October 21023
15:00

Benetton (Italy)	13–13	(Ireland) Munster
Try: Smith 36'; Con: Umaga 37'; Pen: Umaga (2) 9' 15'	Report	Try: Ahern 79'; Con: Carbery 80'; Pen: Carbery (2) 13' 73'

Stadio Comunale di Monigo
Attendance: 5,000
Referee: Morné Ferreira

=== Round 3 ===
4 November 2023
17:15

(1 BP) Munster (Ireland)	45—14	(Wales) Dragons
Try: R. Scannell 13'; G. Coombes 17'; Nash (2) 21' 73'; Ahern 47'; Casey 53'; Gleeson; Con: Butler (4) 15' 48' 54' 65'; Crowley 74'	Report	Try: R. Woodman 35'; Seiuli 80'; Con: Reed (2) 36 81'

Musgrave Park
Referee: Sam Grove-White

=== Round 4 ===
10 November 2023
19:35

Ulster (Ireland)	21-14	(Ireland) Munster
Try: Stockdale 26'; Timoney 67'; Con: Doak 68'; Pen: Doak (3) 13' 46' 63'	Report	Try: Casey (2) 7' 17'; Con: Crowley (2) 8' 19'

Kingspan Stadium
Attendance: 14,960
Referee: Frank Murphy

=== Round 5 ===
18 November 2023
17:15

Munster (Ireland)	10-3	(South Africa) Stormers
Try: Edogbo 39'; Con: Crowley 40'; Pen: Crowley 14'	Report	Pen: Feinberg-Mngomezulu 45'

Thomond Park
Attendance: 15,045
Referee: Sam Grove-White

=== Round 6 ===
25 November 2023
18:30

Leinster (Ireland)	21-16	(Ireland) Munster (1 BP)
Try: Gibson-Park 24'; Sheehan 34'; Larmour 65'; Con: Frawley (3) 25' 35' 66'	Report	Try: Casey 5'; Con: Crowley 6'; Pen: Crowley 13' 52' 73'

Aviva Stadium
Attendance: 49,246
Referee: Chris Busby

=== Round 7 ===
1 December 2023
19:35

(1 BP) Munster (Ireland)	40-29	(Scotland) Glasgow Warriors
Try: Edogbo 7'; Ahern (2) 12', 36'; Barron 15'; Nankivell 48'; Hodnett 64'; Con: Crowley (5) 7', 16', 37', 49', 65'	Report	Try: Vailanu 26'; Matthews 41'; Darge 54'; Penalty try 61'; Fraser 78'; Con: Weir 78'

Musgrave Park
Attendance: 8,400
Referee: Marius van der Westhuizen

=== Round 8 ===
26 December 2023
19:35

(1 BP) Munster (Ireland)	3-9	(Ireland) Leinster
Pen: Crowley 51'	Report	Pen: H. Byrne (3) 1', 15', 80'

Thomond Park
Attendance: 25,600
Referee: Andrew Brace

=== Round 9 ===
1 January 2024
15:00

Connacht (Ireland)	22-9	(Ireland) Munster
Try: Aungier 77'; Con: Hanrahan 78'; Pen: Hanrahan (5) 16' 45' 59' 66' 71'	Report	Pen: Butler (3) 22' 31' 57'

Galway Sportsgrounds
Attendance: 7,240
Referee: Chris Busby

=== Round 10 ===
16 February 2024
19:35

Scarlets (Wales)	7-42	(Ireland) Munster (1 BP)
Try: Roberts 49'; Con: Titcombe 50'	Report	Try: Coombes (2) 10' 23'; O'Sullivan 62'; Ahern 65'; O'Brien 72'; McCarthy 76'; Con: Carbery (6) 11' 24' 62' 66' 73' 77'

Parc y Scarlets
Attendance: 7,039
Referee: Ian Kenny

=== Round 11 ===
1 March 2024
19:35

Munster (1 BP) (Ireland)	45-29	(Italy) Zebre Parma (1 BP)
Try: Quinn (2) 5' 58'; Haley 10'; Snyman 25'; O'Brien 33'; Frisch 39'; Daly 79'; Con: Butler (5) 11' 27' 34' 40' 60'; Cards: Quinn (yellow card) 21' to 31'	Report	Try: Hasa 18'; Dominguez 61'; Prisciantelli 68' de Leeuw 74'; Con: Prisciantelli (3) 19' 68' 75'; Pen: Prisciantelli 22'

Musgrave Park
Attendance: 8,023
Referee: Adam Jones

=== Round 12 ===
22 March 2024
19:35

Ospreys (Wales)	17-27	(Ireland) Munster (1 BP)
Try: Giles 33'; Parry 53'; Cuthbert 73'; Con: Williams 54'; Cards: Tipuric (yellow card) 38' to 48'	Report	Try: Daly 3'; O'Brien (2) 5' 16'; Snyman 57'; Con: Carbery (2) 4' 18'; Pen: Carbery 63'

Swansea.com Stadium
Attendance: 3,897
Referee: Hollie Davidson

=== Round 13 ===
30 March 2024
19:35

Munster (Ireland)	20-15	(Wales) Cardiff
Try: Crowley 63'; Beirne 48'; Con: Crowley (2) 49' 64'; Pen: Crowley (2) 37' 74'; Cards: Ryan (yellow card) 58' to 68'	Report	Try: Thomas 54'; Young 59'; Con: de Beer 55'; Pen: Beetham 78'

Thomond Park
Attendance: 15,423
Referee: Andrea Piardi

=== Round 14 ===
20 April 2024
16:05

Bulls (South Africa)	22-27	(Ireland) Munster (1 BP)
Try: Louw 25'; Arendse 43'; Grobbelaar 49'; Con: Goosen (2) 26' 50'; Pen: Goosen 29'; Cards: Goosen (red card) 53'	Report	Try: Daly 18'; Snyman 36'; Hodnett 57'; Murray 73'; Con: Crowley (2) 20' 37'; Pen: Crowley 41'

Loftus Versfeld Stadium
Attendance: 12,975
Referee: Adam Jones

=== Round 15 ===
27 April 2024
16:00

Lions (South Africa)	13-33	(Ireland) Munster (1 BP)
Try: Botha 61'; Con: Hendrikse 62'; Pen: Hendrikse (2) 27' 37'; Cards: Louw (yellow card) 40+2' to 50'	Report	Try: O'Donoghue 33'; Penalty try 40+2'; Daly 47'; Coombes 78'; Con: Crowley 35'; Pen: Crowley (3) 4' 8' 19'

Emirates Airline Park
Attendance: 6,990
Referee: Craig Evans

=== Round 16 ===
11 May 2024
17:15

Munster (Ireland)	47-12	(Ireland) Connacht
Try: Snyman 19'; Nash 26'; Nankivell 45'; Murray 62'; Carbery 69'; Ahern 72'; Daly 79'; Con: Crowley (3) 19' 29' 46'; Carbery (3) 63' 70' 80'	Report	Try: Ralston (2) 38' 64'; Con: Carty 39'; Cards: Hurley-Langton (yellow card) 18' to 28'

Thomond Park
Attendance: 20,183
Referee: Adam Jones

=== Round 17 ===
17 May 2024
19:35

Edinburgh (1 BP) (Scotland)	26-29	(Ireland) Munster (1 BP)
Try: Bennett 24'; Venter 65'; Con: Healy (2) 25' 66'; Pen: Healy (4) 6' 12' 22' 49'	Report	Try: Frisch (2) 16' 35'; Crowley 42'; Coombes 53'; Con: Crowley (3) 36' 43' 54'; Pen: Crowley 69'; Cards: Murray (yellow card) 63' to 73'

DAM Health Stadium
Attendance: 7,774
Referee: Gianluca Gnecchi

=== Round 18 ===
1 June 2024
17:15

Munster (1 BP) (Ireland)	29-24	(Ireland) Ulster (1 BP)
Try: Snyman 7'; Nash 51'; Daly 58'; Clarke 68'; Con: Crowley (3) 9' 53' 59'; Pen: Crowley 74'	Report	Try: Herring 16'; McCann 40+3'; Rea 54'; Con: Cooney (3) 18' 40+4' 55'; Pen: Cooney 22'

Thomond Park
Attendance: 17,496
Referee: Frank Murphy

=== Quarter-final ===
7 June 2024
19:35

Munster (Ireland)	23-7	(Wales) Ospreys
Try: Zebo 1'; Scannell 17'; Con: Crowley (2) 2' 18'; Pen: Crowley (3) 27' 58' 61'	Report	Try: Giles 4'; Con: Williams 5'

Thomond Park
Attendance: 14,072
Referee: Hollie Davidson

=== Semi-final ===
15 June 2024
18:00

Munster (Ireland)	10-17	(Scotland) Glasgow Warriors
Try: Frisch 55'; Con: Crowley 56'; Pen: Crowley 11'; Cards: Nankivell (red card) 73'	Report	Try: Steyn 23'; Cancelliere 50'; Con: Horne (2) 24' 51'; Pen: Horne 74'; Cards: Gray (yellow card) 10' to 20'; M. Fagerson (yellow card) 39' to 49'

Thomond Park
Attendance: 20,052
Referee: Andrea Piardi

== 2023–24 European Rugby Champions Cup ==
Munster were in tier one for the pool draw of the 2023–24 European Rugby Champions Cup by virtue of being 2022–23 URC champions, and were drawn in pool C, where they will face English clubs Exeter Chiefs and Northampton Saints, and French clubs Bayonne and Toulon.

2023–24 European Rugby Champions Cup Pool C
Team	P	W	D	L	PF	PA	Diff	TF	TA	TB	LB	Pts
(England) Northampton Saints (3)	4	4	0	0	137	75	+62	18	10	2	0	18
(England) Exeter Chiefs (8)	4	3	0	1	87	99	–12	13	14	1	0	13
(Scotland) Glasgow Warriors (12)	4	2	0	2	77	63	+14	12	8	1	1	10
(Ireland) Munster (14)	4	1	1	2	93	93	0	13	10	2	1	9
(France) Bayonne (9CC)	4	1	1	2	82	107	–25	11	16	1	1	8
(France) Toulon	4	0	0	4	60	99	–39	7	16	0	2	2
Green background (rows 1 to 2) indicates qualification places for a home Champions Cup round of 16. Blue background (rows 3 to 4) indicates other teams qualified for the Champions Cup round of 16. Yellow background (row 5) indicates qualification place for the Challenge Cup round of 16. Plain background (row 6) indicates elimination from 2023–24 European competition. Starting table — source: European Professional Club Rugby

=== Round 1 ===
9 December 2023
17:30

Munster (Ireland)	17-17	(France) Bayonne
Try: McCarthy 9"; Coombes 19'; Con: Crowley (2) 10' 19'; Pen: Crowley 54'	Report	Try: Tagi 46'; Baget 75'; Con: Machenaud 47'; Dolhagaray 76'; Pen: Machenaud 4'

Thomond Park
Attendance: 18.908
Referee: Luke Pearce

=== Round 2 ===
17 December 2023
13:00

(1 BP) Exeter Chiefs (England)	32-24	(Ireland) Munster (1 BP)
Try: Frost 15'; Vintcent 62'; Dunne 64'; Slade 78'; Con: Slade (3) 16' 63' 65'; Pen: Slade (2) 26' 45'	Report	Try: Nash 6'; Ahern 22'; Frisch 36'; Daly 49'; Con: Crowley (2) 7' 37'

Sandy Park
Attendance: 13,634
Referee: Mathieu Raynal

=== Round 3 ===
13 January 2024
15:15

Toulon (France)	18-29	(Ireland) Munster (1 BP)
Try: Paia'aua 22' du Preez 53'; Con: Jaminet 23'; Pen: Jaminet (2) 15' 34'	Report	Try: Nankivell 30'; Zebo 36'; Ahern 46'; Nash 59'; Con: Crowley (3) 31' 37' 60'; Pen: Crowley 27'

Stade Mayol
Attendance: 15,248
Referee: Nika Amashukeli

=== Round 4 ===
20 January 2024
17:30

(1 BP) Munster (Ireland)	23-26	(England) Northampton Saints
Try: Frisch 37'; O'Mahony 40 + 1'; Coombes 48'; Con: Crowley 38'; Pen: Crowley (2) 31' 63'	Report	Try: Mitchell 18'; Graham 70'; Con: Smith (2) 18' 71'; Pen: Smith (3) 42' 55' 66'; Drop: Smith 59'

Thomond Park
Attendance: 24,620
Referee: Tual Trainini

=== Last 16 ===
7 April 2024
12:30

Northampton Saints (England)	24-14	(Ireland) Munster
Try: Ramm 9'; Freeman 35'; Hendy (2) 60' 72'; Con: Smith (2) 10' 36'	Report	Try: O'Brien 14'; Haley 27'; Con: Crowley (2) 15' 28'

Franklin's Gardens
Attendance: 15,153
Referee: Mike Adamson

== Player statistics ==
Player statistics from the 2023–24 season. Stats from competitive fixtures only are shown. Academy players in italics.

Pos	Player	Apps	Starts	Sub	Mins	Tries	Cons	Pens	Drops	Points	Yel	Red
PR	Stephen Archer	0	0	0	0	0	0	0	0	0	0	0
PR	Mark Donnelly	0	0	0	0	0	0	0	0	0	0	0
PR	George Hadden	0	0	0	0	0	0	0	0	0	0	0
PR	Dave Kilcoyne	0	0	0	0	0	0	0	0	0	0	0
PR	Keynan Knox	0	0	0	0	0	0	0	0	0	0	0
PR	Jeremy Loughman	0	0	0	0	0	0	0	0	0	0	0
PR	Darragh McSweeney	0	0	0	0	0	0	0	0	0	0	0
PR	John Ryan	0	0	0	0	0	0	0	0	0	0	0
PR	Kieran Ryan	0	0	0	0	0	0	0	0	0	0	0
PR	Roman Salanoa	0	0	0	0	0	0	0	0	0	0	0
PR	Josh Wycherley	0	0	0	0	0	0	0	0	0	0	0
HK	Diarmuid Barron	0	0	0	0	0	0	0	0	0	0	0
HK	Scott Buckley	0	0	0	0	0	0	0	0	0	0	0
HK	Chris Moore	0	0	0	0	0	0	0	0	0	0	0
HK	Niall Scannell	0	0	0	0	0	0	0	0	0	0	0
LK	Thomas Ahern	0	0	0	0	0	0	0	0	0	0	0
LK	Tadhg Beirne	0	0	0	0	0	0	0	0	0	0	0
LK	Edwin Edogbo	0	0	0	0	0	0	0	0	0	0	0
LK	Cian Hurley	0	0	0	0	0	0	0	0	0	0	0
LK	Jean Kleyn	0	0	0	0	0	0	0	0	0	0	0
LK	Evan O'Connell	0	0	0	0	0	0	0	0	0	0	0
LK	RG Snyman	0	0	0	0	0	0	0	0	0	0	0
LK	Fineen Wycherley	0	0	0	0	0	0	0	0	0	0	0
BR	Gavin Coombes	0	0	0	0	0	0	0	0	0	0	0
BR	Jack Daly	0	0	0	0	0	0	0	0	0	0	0
BR	Brian Gleeson	0	0	0	0	0	0	0	0	0	0	0
BR	John Hodnett	0	0	0	0	0	0	0	0	0	0	0
BR	Alex Kendellen	0	0	0	0	0	0	0	0	0	0	0
BR	Jack O'Donoghue	0	0	0	0	0	0	0	0	0	0	0
BR	Daniel Okeke	0	0	0	0	0	0	0	0	0	0	0
BR	Peter O'Mahony	0	0	0	0	0	0	0	0	0	0	0
BR	Jack O'Sullivan	0	0	0	0	0	0	0	0	0	0	0
BR	Ruadhán Quinn	0	0	0	0	0	0	0	0	0	0	0
SH	Craig Casey	0	0	0	0	0	0	0	0	0	0	0
SH	Ethan Coughlan	0	0	0	0	0	0	0	0	0	0	0
SH	Neil Cronin	0	0	0	0	0	0	0	0	0	0	0
SH	Conor Murray	0	0	0	0	0	0	0	0	0	0	0
SH	Jack Oliver	0	0	0	0	0	0	0	0	0	0	0
SH	Paddy Patterson	0	0	0	0	0	0	0	0	0	0	0
FH	Tony Butler	0	0	0	0	0	0	0	0	0	0	0
FH	Joey Carbery	0	0	0	0	0	0	0	0	0	0	0
FH	Jack Crowley	0	0	0	0	0	0	0	0	0	0	0
FH	Dylan Hicks	0	0	0	0	0	0	0	0	0	0	0
CE	Antoine Frisch	0	0	0	0	0	0	0	0	0	0	0
CE	Fionn Gibbons	0	0	0	0	0	0	0	0	0	0	
CE	Alex Nankivell	0	0	0	0	0	0	0	0	0	0	0
CE	Seán O'Brien	0	0	0	0	0	0	0	0	0	0	0
CE	Rory Scannell	0	0	0	0	0	0	0	0	0	0	0
B3	Patrick Campbell	0	0	0	0	0	0	0	0	0	0	0
B3	Andrew Conway	0	0	0	0	0	0	0	0	0	0	0
B3	Liam Coombes	0	0	0	0	0	0	0	0	0	0	0
B3	Shane Daly	0	0	0	0	0	0	0	0	0	0	0
B3	Keith Earls	0	0	0	0	0	0	0	0	0	0	0
B3	Mike Haley	0	0	0	0	0	0	0	0	0	0	0
B3	Shay McCarthy	0	0	0	0	0	0	0	0	0	0	0
B3	Calvin Nash	0	0	0	0	0	0	0	0	0	0	0
B3	Ben O'Connor	0	0	0	0	0	0	0	0	0	0	0
B3	Simon Zebo	0	0	0	0	0	0	0	0	0	0	0
