= Frank McCabe =

Frank McCabe may refer to:

- Frank McCabe (horse trainer)
- Frank McCabe (basketball)
- Frank McCabe (businessman)
