= Patrick O'Donoghue =

Patrick O'Donoghue may refer to:

- Patrick O'Donoghue (bishop) (1934–2021), Irish Roman Catholic bishop of Lancaster, England
- Patrick O'Donoghue (politician) (1930–1989), Northern Ireland politician
- Patrick O'Donoghue (Young Irelander) (died 1854), revolutionary
- Paddy O'Donoghue (rugby union), Irish rugby union player and administrator
