= Joe Brady (rugby union) =

Irish rugby union player (born 1952)

- Full name: Joseph Anthony Brady
- Born: 9 April 1952 (age 74) Dublin, Ireland

Rugby union career
- Position: Centre / Winger
International career
Years	Team	Apps	(Points)
1976	Ireland	2	(0)

Joseph Anthony Brady (born 9 April 1952) is an Irish former rugby union international.

Brady, born in Dublin, attended C.B.C. Monkstown and is a product of Killiney-based club Seapoint.

While playing with Wanderers, Brady was capped twice for Ireland in the 1976 Five Nations Championship, against England at Twickenham and Scotland at Lansdowne Road. He was also a member of the Ireland squad that toured New Zealand that year, playing tour matches but not in the Test. His appearances with Ireland were as a centre, a position he had recently switched to, having previously played his rugby as a wing or wing-forward.

== See also ==
- List of Ireland national rugby union players
