= Seapoint RFC =

Irish rugby union club, based in Killiney, County Dublin

- Full name: Seapoint Rugby Football Club
- Union: (Ireland) IRFU
- Branch: Leinster
- Nickname: Point
- Founded: 1934; 92 years ago
- Ground(s): Kilbogget Park, Killiney (Capacity: 4,000)
- President: Karl O’Neil
Team kit

Seapoint RFC is a community-based Irish rugby union club located in Killiney, County Dublin, playing in the Leinster League.

The club also provides a key focal point for players attending rugby schools who live in the Cabinteely/Killiney/Ballybrack and greater Dun Laoghaire area.

Seapoint are the reigning All Ireland Junior Cup champions in season 2025/26, the second national title the club has won in it is history. The club has won many League & Cup titles across the different senior teams and age groups, at Provincial and Metropolitan level.

The clubs First XV participate in the Leinster League, in Division 1A.

== Club colours ==
The Club colours are black, royal blue and green, with hooped jerseys and socks and black shorts.

== Professionals that played in Seapoint ==
- Felix Jones (Munster)
- Michael Noone (Jersey Rugby Football Club)
- Aaron Dundon (Leinster)
- Peter Lydon (London Scottish)
- Eoghan Clarke (Munster)
- Jack Dunne (Exeter Chiefs)

== Honours ==
Since 1973, Seapoint has won the following Leinster Rugby Competitions. Recent honours without citations can be confirmed via Leinster Rugby results site: https://leinsterrugby.sportlomo.com/

=== Cup Competitions ===
==== National ====
- All Ireland Junior Cup (2006–07, 2025-26)

==== Provincial ====
- Metropolitan Cup (J1) (2005, 2006, 2008, 2025)
- Spencer Cup (J1) (1973, 1980, 1995, 2001, 2003, 2004, 2007, 2009)
- Colm O'Shea Cup (2021)
- Jim Byrne Cup (J2) (2023)
- Moran Cup (J3) (2025)
- Harry Gale Cup (Under 20) (1987, 2021, 2024)
- John Madden Cup (2024)

=== League Competitions ===
- Leinster League Division 1 (2004, 2009)
- Leinster League Division 2 (1995, 2003)
- Leinster League Division 3 (2001)
- Leinster Metro League Division 8 (2014)
- Junior 2 League (1977)
- Junior 3 League (1977)
- Junior 1B League (1978)
- Metropolitan League (Under 18) (2000, 2001)

== Representative honours ==
=== Ireland ===
- Felix Jones

=== Ireland U18 (Women) ===
- Roisin Ridge

=== Ireland Under-19 ===
- Gary Foley
- Michael Noone

=== Ireland Under-20 ===
- Gary Foley
- Michael Noone

=== Ireland Schools ===
- Gary Foley
- Michael Noone

=== Leinster & Leinster A ===
- Joe Brady
- Felix Jones
- Arron Dundon
- Michael Noone

=== Munster & Munster A ===
- Felix Jones

=== Leinster Juniors ===
- Mark Barrett
- Sam Boazman
- **Tom Chadwick**
- Mark Coughlan
- Aaron Dundon
- J.P. Finlay
- **Liam Forster**
- Mark Garton
- Barry Gaskin
- Jamie Gill
- Peter Grehan
- Declan Griffin
- **Cormac Hurley**
- Kenny Jones
- Zac Jungmann (c)
- Brian Keegan
- Mark Kelly
- Paul Kelly
- Simon Kelly
- Roie Mamane
- Andy McCleane
- Mark McCoy
- **Matt McKenna**
- **Oisin McKenna**
- **Donal McMahon (c)**
- Bryan Murphy
- Stephen O'Connor
- Tom O'Connor (c)
- Peter O'Farrelly
- Gerry Paley
- Eoin Quinn
- Stephen Verso
- Jonathon Walsh
- Eddie Weaver

(c) - Team Captain

Bold = Currently representing

=== Leinster U19 & 20's ===
- Eoin Cremin
- Gary Foley
- Felix Jones
- Ian Kelly
- Michael Noone
- Zac Jungmann

=== Leinster Youths ===
- Oisin Doyle
- Simon Kelly

=== Leinster Schools ===
- Eoin Cremin
- Gary Foley
- Michael Noone
- Frank Scully
- Simon Kelly
- Ross O'Carroll-Kelly - fictional character from the novel 'Game of Throw Ins'.

=== Connacht Schools ===
- Ken Concannon

Aidan Williams, who served with on the committee of the Association of Referees (Leinster Branch), was the president of that body in the season 1978–1979.
