= Ronan Fanning =

Irish historian (1941–2017)

Ronan Fanning MRIA
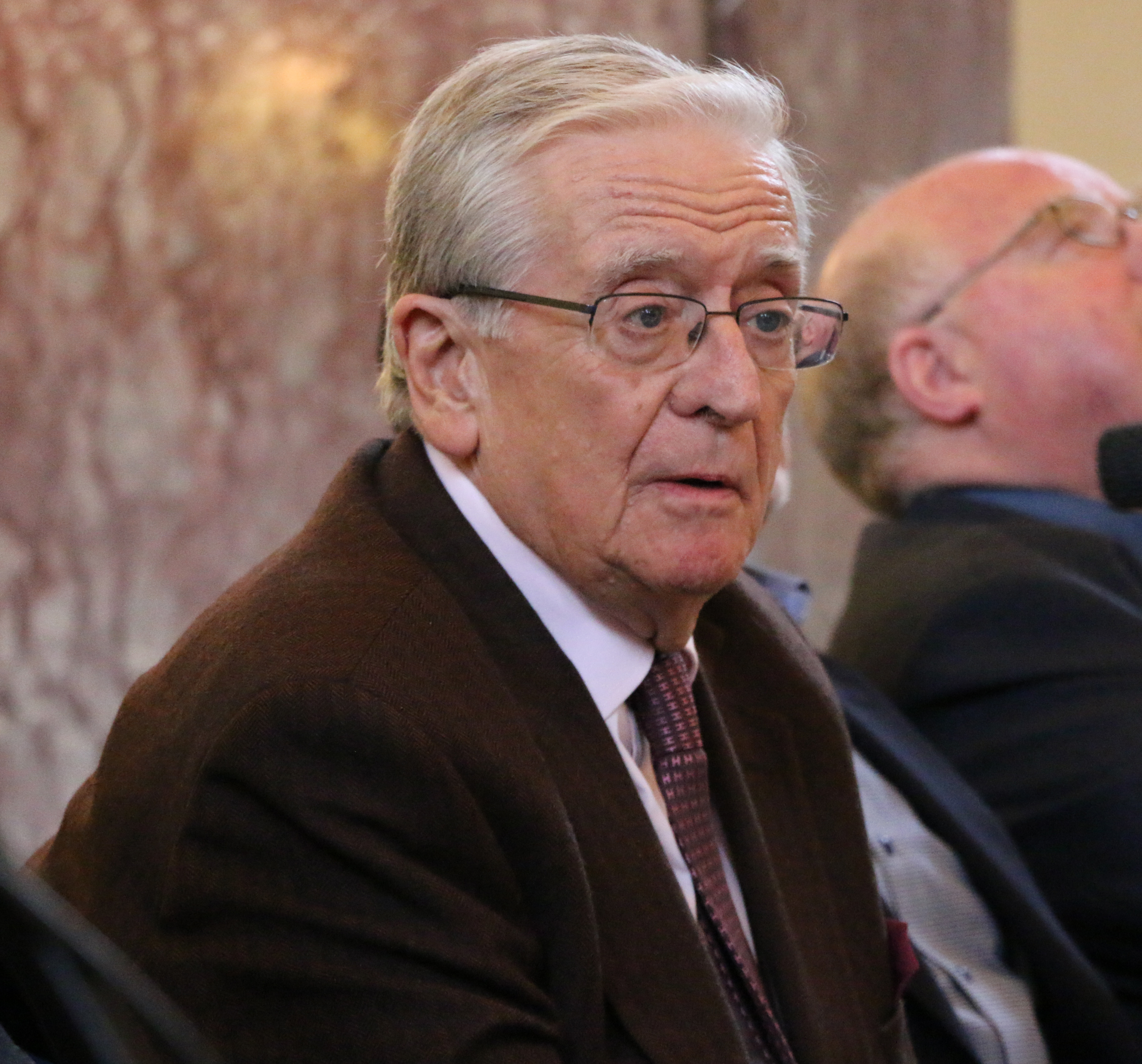
- Professor Ronan Fanning in 2016
- Born: 6 May 1941
- Died: 18 January 2017 (aged 75)
- Occupation: Historian

Ronan Fanning MRIA (6 May 1941 – 18 January 2017) was an Irish historian.

== Biography ==
The son of an Irish doctor and English Montessori teacher, Fanning was educated at St Michael's College, Dublin and C.B.C. Monkstown. He received his undergraduate degree from UCD and his doctoral thesis on "Balfour and Unionism" from Cambridge University. He was Fulbright Professor at Georgetown University in Washington DC in 1976-1977, researching the triangular relationship between Britain, Ireland and the US.

In 1978, he wrote the book, The Irish Department of Finance, (1922-1958), hailed as a pioneering work on the transfer of power from the British government to the Irish administration of W. T. Cosgrave and later to that of Éamon de Valera.

Amongst his other noted books included Fatal Path: British Government and Irish Revolution 1910-1922, which examines the British government's role in Ireland's struggle for Independence.

Fanning's academic work focused primarily on diplomacy and high politics. He was strongly in favour of commemoration of the Easter Rising and critical of former Taoiseach John Bruton's criticism of the Rising.

He was professor of modern History at University College Dublin and director of archives at the School of History and Archives (University College Dublin). A member of the Royal Irish Academy (MRIA), he was a member of the board of the Dictionary of Irish Biography and the Documents on Irish Foreign Policy. He was also a regular political, historical and current affairs columnist at the Sunday Independent.

Fanning died on 18 January 2017. He was 75. President Michael D Higgins described him as an "admired and respected historian whose extensive research and writings delivered a rich legacy to Irish scholarship".

== Publications ==
- Documents on Irish Foreign Policy by Catriona Crowe, Ronan Fanning, Michael Kennedy, Dermot Keogh, Eunan O'Halpin. Royal Irish Academy, ISBN 1-904890-03-2 (1-904890-03-2)
- Independent Ireland, The Educational Company of Ireland, ISBN 0-86167-301-8 (0-86167-301-8)
- The Irish Department of Finance, (1922-58) by Ronan Fanning, Institute of Public Administration (Ireland) Staff Hardcover, Institute of Public Administration, ISBN 0-902173-82-0 (0-902173-82-0)
- Religion and Rebellion by Judith Devlin, Ronan Fanning, University College Dublin Press, ISBN 1-900621-03-7 (1-900621-03-7)
- The Lives of Eliza Lynch by Michael Lillis and Ronan Fanning, Gill and Macmillan (September 2009).
- Fatal Path: British Government and Irish Revolution 1910-1922 by Ronan Fanning, Faber and Faber (August 2013).
- Eamon de Valera: A Will to Power by Ronan Fanning, Faber and Faber (2015)

Ronan Fanning, list of publications.
