= Michael Quinn (judge) =

Irish solicitor, High Court judge since 2018

The Hon. Mr. Justice Michael Quinn

Judge of the High Court
- Incumbent
- Assumed office 27 July 2018
- Nominated by: Government of Ireland
- Appointed by: Michael D. Higgins

Personal details
- Education: University College Dublin; Law Society of Ireland

Michael Quinn is an Irish judge and lawyer who has served as a Judge of the High Court since July 2018. He was formerly a solicitor and partner at a commercial law firm.

== Education ==
Quinn was educated at C.B.C. Monkstown followed by University College Dublin, graduating with a BCL degree in 1981. He was the auditor of the University College Dublin Law Society between 1981 and 1982. His inaugural address was on the topic "The Control of Police Discretion" which was responded to by the then Supreme Court judge Séamus Henchy.

== Legal career ==
He joined the commercial law firm William Fry as an apprentice solicitor in 1982 and qualified as a solicitor in 1985. He became a partner in November 1994. Prior to becoming a member of the judiciary, Quinn was the head of the corporate recovery department at William Fry and senior partner in litigation. He practised as a litigator specialising in Irish insolvency law.

He advised on the restructuring of Waterford Wedgwood and advised the share receiver of the Quinn Group, the receivers appointed by the National Asset Management Agency of Treasury Holdings and the Irish administrators of Nortel. Some of his other work related to TransAer International Airlines, Parmalat, Chorus Communication Limited and Swissair.

Quinn was involved in legal insolvency associations, serving terms as president of the European Association of Insolvency Practitioners and founding the Irish Society of Insolvency Practitioners.

He further qualified as an accredited mediator and is a Bencher of the King's Inns.

== Judicial career ==
Quinn became a High Court judge in July 2018.

He is assigned to the Commercial Division of the High Court. He has heard commercial disputes since his appointment, including between Shane Byrne and a waste management company, and Larry Goodman and a founder of the Blackrock Clinic. He has also heard applications for leave for judicial review.

He manages cases involving examinerships and other insolvency matters. He heard applications for examiners and liquidators to be appointed to insolvent companies arising out of the COVID-19 pandemic in the Republic of Ireland, including CityJet, Joe.ie, the USIT travel agency, and Laura Ashley plc.

He serves on the advisory board of the Judicial Co-operation for Economic Recovery in Europe project and is a judicial member of the European Association of Insolvency Practitioners.
