= Patrick Casey (rugby union) =

Irish rugby union player

- Born: Patrick Joseph Casey; August 4, 1941 Dublin, Ireland
- Died: 23 July 2023 (aged 81)
- University: University College Dublin
- Occupation: Rugby Union player

Rugby union career
- Position: Wing
Senior career
Years	Team	Apps	(Points)
- UCD
–	Lansdowne Football Club		
International career
Years	Team	Apps	(Points)
	Ireland	12	

Patrick Joseph Casey (4 August 1941 - 26 July 2023), commonly called Pat Casey, was an Ireland rugby union player.

Born in Dublin, he began playing rugby at school at C.B.C. Monkstown before moving onto University College Dublin. He played for Lansdowne Football Club (where he is in their hall of fame) and provincially for Leinster. He made his international debut on 16 January, 1963 against France. He was capped 12 times, scoring three tries for Ireland at wing playing alongside the likes of Mike Gibson, Tony O'Reilly, Tom Kiernan and Willie John McBride.

Casey scored one of the greatest tries in Irish rugby history against England in an 18–5 rout at Twickenham in 1964. A move begun by débutante fly half Mike Gibson in their 22 was finished off by Casey. The game was one of the first ever rugby games captured by RTÉ television cameras. At the time, the 13-point margin of victory was the highest ever achieved by any of the "Home Nations" (Ireland, Scotland, Wales) against England at Twickenham. It stood for 58 years until Ireland beat England by 32 points to 15 in the 2022 Six Nations Championship.

Casey also scored a try for Leinster in the same year versus the All Blacks in an 11–8 defeat. A 40-yard interception almost made history for the Irish province.
