= Noel Feddis =

Irish rugby union player

- Born: 29 December 1932 Dublin, Ireland
- Died: 4 March 2021 (aged 88) Dublin, Ireland

Rugby union career
- Position: Wing-forward
International career
Years	Team	Apps	(Points)
1956	Ireland	1	(0)

Noel Feddis (29 December 1932 — 4 March 2021) was an Irish international rugby union player.

Feddis was born in Dublin and educated at C.B.C. Monkstown.

A Lansdowne Player, Feddis was capped for Ireland as a wing-forward against England at Lansdowne Road during the 1956 Five Nations, only a year after he had begun playing top-class rugby.

Feddis later lived in the United States and played for the New York Rugby Club.

== See also ==
- List of Ireland national rugby union players
