= Simon Zebo =

Irish rugby union player

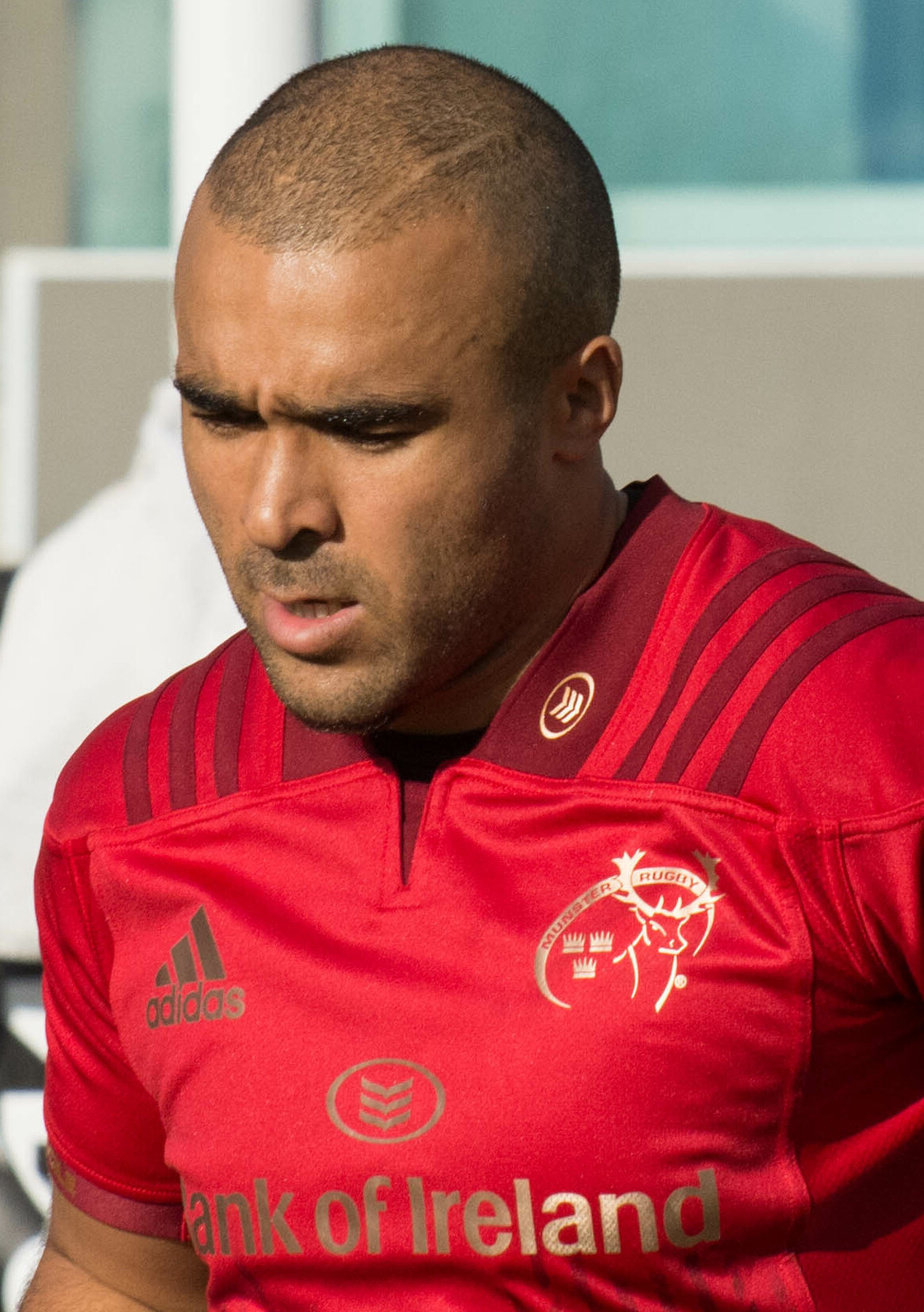
- Zebo in 2017
- Born: 16 March 1990 (age 36) Cork, Ireland
- Height: 1.88 m (6 ft 2 in)
- Weight: 99 kg (15.6 st; 218 lb)
- School: Presentation Brothers College

Rugby union career
- Position(s): Wing, Fullback
Amateur team(s)
Years	Team	Apps	(Points)
2007–2012	Cork Constitution		
Senior career
Years	Team	Apps	(Points)
2010–2018	Munster	144	(300)
2018–2021	Racing 92	60	(125)
2021–2024	Munster	32	(65)
- Correct as of 15 June 2024
International career
Years	Team	Apps	(Points)
2010	Ireland U20	9	(18)
2012–2014	Ireland Wolfhounds	2	(5)
2012–2017	Ireland	35	(45)
- Correct as of 17 June 2017

Simon Zebo (born 16 March 1990) is an Irish former rugby union player who played as a wing or fullback for clubs Munster and Racing 92 and for Ireland and the British and Irish Lions.

== Early life ==
Born in Cork, Zebo attended Beaumont Boys School and Presentation Brothers College, Cork. In his youth he also played hurling for Blackrock GAA and association football for Avondale United.

== Munster ==
=== 2010–2013 ===
Zebo made his Munster debut against Connacht on 18 April 2010 and scored his first try for Munster against Scarlets in April 2011. He made his Heineken Cup debut for Munster against Scarlets on 10 December 2011. Zebo opened his Heineken Cup scoring account with a hat-trick against Northampton Saints on 21 January 2012, during a Man-of-the-Match performance in the round 6 fixture.

In January 2013, Zebo agreed a three-year contract with Munster. He became the first ever player to score two Heineken Cup hat-tricks within a year, scoring three of Munster's five tries in the home match against Racing 92 on 20 January 2013, again being awarded the Man-of-the-Match. He made his return from the foot injury sustained in Ireland's 2013 Six Nations in Munster's 18–12 Heineken Cup quarter-final victory against Harlequins on 7 April 2013. He also started the 16–10 semi-final defeat to Clermont Auvergne on 27 April 2013. Zebo was named Munster Young Player of the Year for the 2012–13 season on 12 May 2013. He was also nominated for Munster Player of the Year.

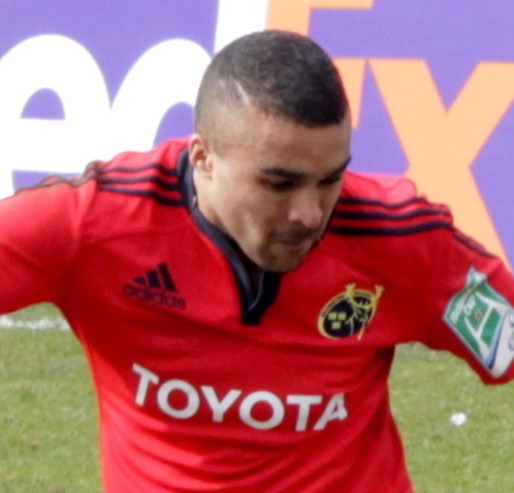
Zebo playing against Harlequins in the 2012–13 Heineken Cup.

Zebo suffered a foot injury during Munster's opening 2013–14 Heineken Cup fixture against Edinburgh on 12 October 2013, ruling him out for 10 weeks.

=== 2014–2018 ===
Zebo returned to full training on 6 January 2014. Zebo came off the bench in the 20–7 away win against Gloucester on 11 January 2014, a win that secured quarter-final qualification in the 2013–14 Heineken Cup. He also came off the bench against Edinburgh in the round 6 fixture on 19 January 2014, scoring a try in the 38–6 win that secured a home quarter-final. Zebo scored a brace of tries against Zebre on 15 February 2014. He started in Munster's Heineken Cup quarter-final against Toulouse on 5 April 2014, scoring a try in the 47–23 win. Zebo started in Munster's semi-final against Toulon on 27 April 2014, scoring a try in the 24–16 defeat.

Zebo scored a try in Munster's win against Benetton on 12 September 2014. He scored a hat-trick against Zebre on 19 September 2014, a game in which he won the Man-of-the-Match award. Zebo started in Munster's first European Rugby Champions Cup game against Sale Sharks on 18 October 2014. He started against Saracens in round 2 of the Champions Cup on 24 October 2014. Zebo started in the round 3 game against Clermont Auvergne on 6 December 2014. He also started in the reverse fixture against Clermont on 14 December 2014. Zebo started against Saracens on 17 January 2015. He started at Fullback against Sale Sharks in round 6 on 25 January 2015, scoring two tries and earning the Man-of-the-Match award in the 65–10 win. Zebo scored a try in Munster's 42–20 win against Connacht on 28 March 2015. In doing so, he equaled Doug Howlett's record of 22 league tries for Munster. Zebo scored a try in Munster's 34–3 win against Edinburgh on 11 April 2015, overtaking Howlett's record. He scored a try in the 30–19 win against Treviso on 25 April 2015. Zebo scored a try in Munster's 21–18 play-off semi-final win against Ospreys on 23 May 2015. He started for Munster in the 2015 Pro12 Grand Final against Glasgow Warriors on 30 May 2015.

Zebo started the opening pool game of the 2015–16 European Rugby Champions Cup against Benetton on 14 November 2015, scoring a try in Munster's 32–7 win. He started against Leicester Tigers in the Champions Cup on 12 December 2015. On 16 January 2016, Zebo scored a try in Munster's round 4 Champions Cup game against Stade Français, equaling Anthony Horgan's record of 41 tries scored for Munster. On 1 February 2016, it was announced that Zebo had signed a new two-year contract with Munster and the IRFU. On 25 March 2016, Zebo scored two tries against Zebre. In doing so, he overtook Anthony Horgan's try-scoring record (41) for Munster. On 16 April 2016, Zebo earnt his 100th cap for Munster, starting at Fullback in the game against Connacht.

On 3 September 2016, Zebo went off injured in Munster's 2016–17 Pro12 fixture against Scarlets. He was subsequently ruled out for 5 weeks with a fractured rib. On 1 October 2016, he made his return from the injury, scoring a try in Munster's 49–5 win against Zebre. On 7 January 2017, Zebo scored his 50th try for Munster in the sides 32–7 away win against Racing 92. On 27 May 2017, Zebo started for Munster against Scarlets in the 2017 Pro12 Grand Final. It was confirmed in October 2017 that Zebo would leave Munster at the end of the 2017–18 season. Zebo's try in Munster's 27–22 Champions Cup semi-final defeat against Racing 92 on 22 April 2018 saw him equal Anthony Foley's club record of 23 tries in European games. He set up Keith Earls' crucial try in Munster's 20–16 win against Edinburgh in the 2017–18 Pro14 semi-final qualifier on 5 May 2018, a match that was Zebo's final appearance for his home province in Thomond Park. Zebo made his final appearance for Munster on 19 May 2018, starting in the provinces 16–15 defeat at the hands of Leinster in their Pro14 semi-final.

== Racing 92 ==
French Top 14 club Racing 92 confirmed in January 2018 that Zebo would be joining them at the beginning of the 2018–19 season. Zebo made his competitive debut for Racing on 25 August 2018, starting at fullback in their 25–9 win against Toulon. He scored his first try for Racing in their 40–17 defeat at the hands of Clermont on 2 September 2018. During Racing 92's 26–22 defeat against Ulster in the Champions Cup on 12 January 2019, Zebo was the target of racial abuse from an Ulster fan; Ulster later issued a lifetime ban to the individual responsible for the racism.

Zebo started for Racing 92 in the 2020 European Rugby Champions Cup Final against English club Exeter Chiefs on 17 October, scoring two tries in their narrow 31–27 defeat and earning praise for his performance. Zebo also paid tribute to his former Munster coach Anthony Foley during the game, who died suddenly on 16 October 2016 while Munster were in Paris to play Racing 92 in a Champions Cup pool game. Zebo's final game for Racing 92 was their 19–6 defeat against Ronan O'Gara's La Rochelle in the semi-finals of the 2020–21 Top 14 season on 18 June 2021.

== Return to Munster ==
After three seasons with Racing 92, Zebo returned to his native province Munster on a one-year contract for the 2021–22 season. Zebo's contract was co-funded by the IRFU, and he took a salary cut to rejoin the club. Zebo made his 'second debut' for Munster in their opening 2021–22 United Rugby Championship fixture against the Sharks on 25 September 2021, scoring two tries in their 42–17 win against the South African side. He was sent off in Munster's 18–13 home win against provincial rivals Ulster in round 10 of the United Rugby Championship on 8 January 2022; no further action was taken against Zebo by a disciplinary panel following the incident.

Zebo signed a two-year contract extension with Munster in January 2022. He scored two tries in Munster's 45–7 win at home to Wasps in round 4 of the 2021–22 Champions Cup on 23 January 2022, which saw Zebo become Munster's all-time leading try-scorer in the competition with 25, as well as the leading Irish try-scorer in the competition with 34, overtaking Brian O'Driscoll for the latter record, and moved up to third in the all-time record for try scorers in the competition, behind only Vincent Clerc (36) and Chris Ashton (40).

Zebo earned his 150th cap for Munster in their 13–11 away defeat against Glasgow Warriors in the rescheduled round 18 of the 2021–22 United Rugby Championship on 11 February 2022, and scored a hat-trick of tries in Munster's 34–20 home win against Edinburgh in round 12 of the URC on 18 February 2022. He started and scored one try in Munster's historic 28–14 win against a South Africa XV in Páirc Uí Chaoimh on 10 November 2022.

He retired from rugby at the end of the 2023–24 season. He retired as Munster’s record try-scorer with 72 in 176 appearances, with 35 of them coming in the Champions Cup.

== Ireland ==
=== 2012–2015 ===
Zebo was selected to train alongside the main 24-man Irish senior squad for the first week of their training for the 2012 Six Nations Championship. He was called up into the Ireland Wolfhounds squad for their game against England Saxons after Luke Fitzgerald failed to recover from injury in time. He made his Wolfhounds debut against England Saxons on 28 January 2012, scoring a try during the game. He was selected in Ireland's senior squad for the 2012 tour to New Zealand and made his senior Ireland debut on 9 June 2012, starting on the left-wing in the first test.

Zebo scored his first try for Ireland against Argentina on 24 November 2012, whilst playing at Fullback. Zebo was named in Ireland's training squad for the 2013 Six Nations Championship on 17 January 2013. He made his Six Nations debut on 2 February 2013, scoring a try as Ireland beat Wales 30–22 in the Millennium Stadium. Zebo hit the headlines when he used a back-heel flick to retain the ball in the lead-up to Cian Healy's try for Ireland against Wales. He started against England on 10 February 2013, but went off injured early in the first half. Zebo was ruled out for 10 weeks after suffering a broken foot during the match. Zebo won the IRUPA award for Supporters' Player of the Year on 8 May 2013. He was also nominated for Players' Player of the Year, but lost out to Ulster's Nick Williams. Zebo was named in the Ireland squad for the 2013 Ireland tour to North America on 19 May 2013. He started against the United States on 8 June 2013.

Zebo was added to the extended Ireland training squad for the 2014 Six Nations Championship on 20 January 2014. He came off the bench for Ireland Wolfhounds in their friendly against England Saxons on 25 January 2014. Zebo was added to the Ireland squad for the 2014 Six Nations fixture against Italy.

Zebo was named in the Ireland squad for their 2014 Tour to Argentina on 19 May 2014. He started the first test against Argentina on 7 June 2014. Zebo also started the second test against Argentina on 14 June 2014, scoring a try.

Zebo was named in the Ireland squad for the 2014 Guinness Series on 21 October 2014. He started in the 29–15 win against South Africa on 8 November 2014. He also started in the 49–7 win against Georgia on 16 November 2014, scoring a try. Zebo started against Australia on 22 November 2014, scoring the opening try in the 26–23 win for Ireland.

Zebo was named in the Ireland squad for the opening rounds of the 2015 Six Nations Championship on 1 February 2015. He started against Italy on 7 February 2015. Zebo started against France on 14 February 2015. He started in the 19–9 win against England on 1 March 2015. Zebo started against Wales on 14 March 2015. England's failure to score enough points against France meant Ireland won the 2015 Six Nations Championship, the first time Ireland have won back-to-back championships since 1948–49.

Zebo was named in the 45-man training squad for the 2015 Rugby World Cup on 24 June 2015. He came off the bench in the first World Cup warm-up against Wales on 8 August 2015, scoring a try in the 35–21 win for Ireland. Zebo started the second warm-up against Scotland on 15 August 2015, scoring another try and earning the Man-of-the-Match award in Ireland's 28–22 win. He was selected in the final 31-man squad for the World Cup when it was announced on 1 September 2015. Zebo started in the final warm-up game against England on 5 September 2015. He came off the bench during the opening pool game against Canada on 19 September 2015. Zebo started the second pool game against Romania on 27 September 2015. Following an injury to Rob Kearney, Zebo started at fullback in Ireland's 16–9 win over Italy on 4 October 2015.

=== 2016–2021 ===
On 20 January 2016, Zebo was named in Ireland's 35-man squad for the 2016 Six Nations Championship. On 7 February 2016, Zebo started at Fullback against Wales in Ireland's opening match of the Six Nations. On 27 February 2016, Zebo came off the bench in Ireland's 21–10 defeat against England. On 26 October 2016, Zebo was named in Ireland's squad for the 2016 end-of-year rugby union internationals. On 5 November 2016, Zebo started in Ireland's test against New Zealand at Soldier Field, Chicago, scoring a try in a 40–29 win that was Ireland's first ever against the All Blacks.

Zebo was named in the Ireland squad for the 2017 Six Nations Championship, and started every game in the tournament. He was also selected in the squad for the 2017 Summer Tour against the United States and Japan. He came off the bench against the United States on 10 June, scoring a try in Ireland's 55–19 win. He also started in the first test against Japan on 17 June, but a knee injury ruled him out of the second test.

After a four-year absence due to his move to play for Racing 92 in France, Zebo returned to the Ireland squad when he was selected by head coach Andy Farrell for the 2021 Autumn internationals.

== British & Irish Lions ==
Zebo was called up the 2013 British & Irish Lions tour to Australia squad as injury-cover for Ireland teammate Tommy Bowe on 8 June 2013. He started against Waratahs on 15 June 2013. Zebo came off the bench against Brumbies on 18 June 2013. He started against Melbourne Rebels on 25 June 2013.

== Retirement as player ==
Zebo announced on 21 May 2024 that he would be retiring at the end of the season.

== Statistics ==
=== International tries ===
Try	Opposing team	Location	Venue	Competition	Date	Result
1	Argentina	Dublin	Aviva Stadium	2012 November Tests	24 November 2012	Won
2	Wales	Cardiff	Millennium Stadium	2013 Six Nations	2 February 2013	Won
3	Argentina	Tucumán	Estadio Monumental José Fierro	2014 Ireland Tour	14 June 2014	Won
4	Georgia	Dublin	Aviva Stadium	2014 November Tests	16 November 2014	Won
5	Australia	Dublin	Aviva Stadium	2014 November Tests	22 November 2014	Won
6	Wales	Cardiff	Millennium Stadium	2015 RWC warm-up	8 August 2015	Won
7	Scotland	Dublin	Aviva Stadium	2015 RWC warm-up	15 August 2015	Won
8	New Zealand	Chicago	Soldier Field	2016 November Tests	5 November 2016	Won
9	United States	Harrison	Red Bull Arena	2017 Summer Tests	10 June 2017	Won

=== International analysis by opposition ===
Against	Played	Won	Lost	Drawn	Tries	Points	% Won
Argentina	3	3	0	0	2	10	100
Australia	2	2	0	0	1	5	100
Canada	1	1	0	0	0	0	100
England	5	2	3	0	0	0	40
France	2	2	0	0	0	0	100
Georgia	1	1	0	0	1	5	100
Italy	4	4	0	0	0	0	100
Japan	1	1	0	0	0	0	100
New Zealand	3	1	2	0	1	5	33.33
Romania	1	1	0	0	0	0	100
Scotland	3	2	1	0	1	5	66.67
South Africa	2	1	1	0	0	0	50
United States	2	2	0	0	1	5	100
Wales	5	2	2	1	2	10	40
Total	35	25	9	1	9	45	71.43

Correct as of 5 July 2017

== Honours ==
=== Presentation Brothers College ===
- Munster Schools Rugby Senior Cup:
  - Winner (1): 2007

=== Cork Constitution ===
- All-Ireland League:
  - Winner (2): 2007–08, 2009–10
- All-Ireland Cup:
  - Winner (1): 2009–10
- Munster Senior Cup:
  - Winner (1): 2008–09

=== Munster ===
- United Rugby Championship
  - Winner (2): 2010-11, 2022–23

=== Ireland Under-20s ===
- Six Nations Under 20s Championship:
  - Winner (1): 2010

=== Ireland ===
- Six Nations Championship:
  - Winner (1): 2015

== Personal life ==
Zebo is the son of a Martinique-born French athlete, Arthur and his Irish wife, Cork-born Lynda. His older sister, Jessika Zebo, is a project co-ordinator who has represented Ireland as a hurdler. In May 2015, Zebo and his partner Elvira Fernández welcomed their first child, a son named Jacob. Their daughter, Sofia, was born in August 2016, their second son, Noah, was born in November 2019, and their second daughter, Isabella, was born in April 2022. The couple married in August 2022.

In October 2026, he released his autobiography, titled Zeebs.
