= CBS Eblana =

School in County Dublin, Ireland

The school

CBS Eblana is the name by which a former Christian Brothers School (CBS) at Eblana Avenue is commonly known. The school was located in Dún Laoghaire, County Dublin, Ireland. It was a second level and primary school located from 1856 until 1992. It closed due to lack of pupils most likely caused by a population shift to the outlying area of Monkstown, Loughlinstown and Shankill.

The school suffered from a fire that started in an empty gym room in 1989. The local fire chief stated in a report that much work would need to be done to bring the school up to a modern standard. The pupils were transferred to nearby St Joseph's National School, Tivoli Road, Dún Laoghaire. The school operated as the sole Christian Brothers school in Dún Laoghaire until 1951 when the school was split into two.

The secondary section was broken off, with a new secondary department opened at Eblana in 1954, the public and free CBS Eblana. Meanwhile, the Christian Brothers bought the fee paying collegiate C.B.C. Monkstown grounds at Monkstown Park, Gables' Hill in Monkstown. Since the mid-1990s, the CBS grounds have been used as a youth hostel. The building is now used by Blackrock Further Education Institute.

== Alumni ==
- Ronnie Drew - singer
- Tony Adams - film producer
