= Paddy O'Donoghue (rugby union) =

Irish rugby union player

Paddy O'Donoghue is a former Irish rugby international prop who also represented the Barbarians and was an administrator in Irish rugby. He was educated at CBC Dún Laoghaire (now CBC Monkstown). He played his club rugby for Bective Rangers, winning the Leinster Club Senior Cup in 1955 and 1956. During this time the club was notable for Welsh international Cliff Morgan who lined out at fly half, the club was nicknamed 'Morgan's Rangers' due to his influence. O'Donoghue also played with IRFU president John Lyons, along with internationals Maurice Mortell, Fergus Keogh, Gerry Hardy, Paddy Costello and Bill Mulcahy.

O'Donoghue won eleven caps for Ireland between 1955 and 1958, making his debut versus France.

Following his retirement, he coached at various levels including his former club. He served as both treasurer and secretary of the IRFU including being in charge of organising the Rugby World Cup in Ireland in 1991. He was replaced as IRFU secretary in 1995.
