= Michael Noone =

Irish rugby union player

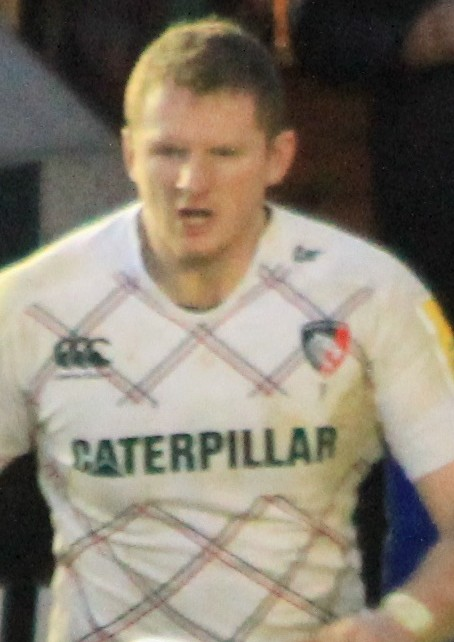
- Born: Michael Noone; 16 October 1989 (age 37) Dublin, Republic of Ireland
- Height: 191 cm (6 ft 3 in)
- Weight: 112 kg (17.6 st)
- School: Presentation College, Bray; C.B.C. Monkstown
- University: National College of Ireland

Rugby union career
- Position: No.8
- Current team: Clontarf
Amateur team(s)
Years	Team	Apps	(Points)
- Seapoint
–	Blackrock College		
Senior career
Years	Team	Apps	(Points)
2011-2012	Doncaster Knights	24	(0)
2011	Rotherham Titans		
2012–2014	Leicester Tigers	10	(25)
2014–	JerseyClontarf		
- Correct as of 18 January 2013
International career
Years	Team	Apps	(Points)
2009	Ireland u20	2	(0)
- Correct as of 10 Feb 2015

Michael Noone (born 16 October 1989) is an Irish rugby union player from County Wicklow, Ireland currently playing for Clontarf

Noone is from Greystones, County Wicklow. He was educated at Presentation College, Bray where he played in the final of the Leinster Schools Junior Cup alongside fellow future professional, Jason Harris-Wright. Noone then moved to C.B.C. Monkstown where they reached the semi-finals of the Senior Cup. Noone has captained Leinster at all under age levels. He also led a strong contingent of CBC players on an undefeated tour to South Africa before being selected to the Irish under 19 squad.

Following school Noone immediately began playing 1st XV club rugby at Seapoint, where he first played the game. In 2010 he moved to Blackrock College. Noone also represented the Ireland national under-20 rugby union team in the 2009/2010 season.

In 2011 Michael Noone played for Doncaster Knights in the RFU Championship. He signed for Leicester in September 2012. In 2014 Noone signed for Jersey. He has now played for Clontarf for 3 years. Winning the All Ireland title in his first year. Noone, now in his third year is currently the capitan. Michael Noone is in a small selection of players to capitan under the age of 30.
