= Hugh Cahill =

Irish journalist and sports commentator

- Education: CBC Monkstown Park, Dublin; Waterford Institute of Technology
- Employer: Raidió Teilifís Éireann (RTÉ)
- Known for: Commentary, broadcasting

Hugh Cahill is an Irish sports commentator, reporter, broadcaster and author. As of 2019, he was the lead rugby commentator at RTÉ, taking over the role from Ryle Nugent in 2017. He provides commentary for the World Rugby Sevens Series globally, and has also presented Game On on RTÉ 2fm, and has fronted RTÉ Sport's horse racing coverage.

He has provided RTÉ commentary from the 2011 Rugby World Cup, 2012 Summer Olympics, 2014 FIFA World Cup, 2016 Summer Olympics, 2018 FIFA World Cup, 2019 FIFA Women's World Cup and UEFA Euro 2020.

In 2018 he published a book, Winners: The horses, the memories, the defining moments.
