= John Keogh (RTÉ) =

John Keogh is an Irish musician, producer, director and television personality. In the 1960s he was the lead singer of the showband, The Greenbeats, and later became a producer at RTÉ. The productions on RTÉ which he produced include The Live Mike and Bull Island. He has also appeared in a number of RTÉ shows including The Lyrics Board where he was a team captain for a season and Killinaskully. He once took part in the 1965 Irish National Song Festival with the song "Yesterday's Dream" coming 3rd.
