= Maurice Mortell =

Irish rugby union player

- Born: 13 March 1930 Bandon, Co. Cork, Ireland
- School: Presentation Brothers College

Rugby union career
- Position: Wing
International career
Years	Team	Apps	(Points)
1953–54	Ireland	9	(15)

Maurice Mortell (born 13 March 1930) is an Irish former international rugby union player.

Mortell was born in Bandon, County Cork, and educated at Presentation Brothers College.

A speed winger, Mortell was an Ireland player in 1953 and 1954, gaining nine caps. He scored five tries for Ireland, managing a try in each of his first three internationals during the 1953 Five Nations.

Mortell won two Leinster Senior Cups playing with Bective Rangers, a club his son Maurice Jr later captained.

== See also ==
- List of Ireland national rugby union players
