= Ryan Woodman =

Welsh rugby union player

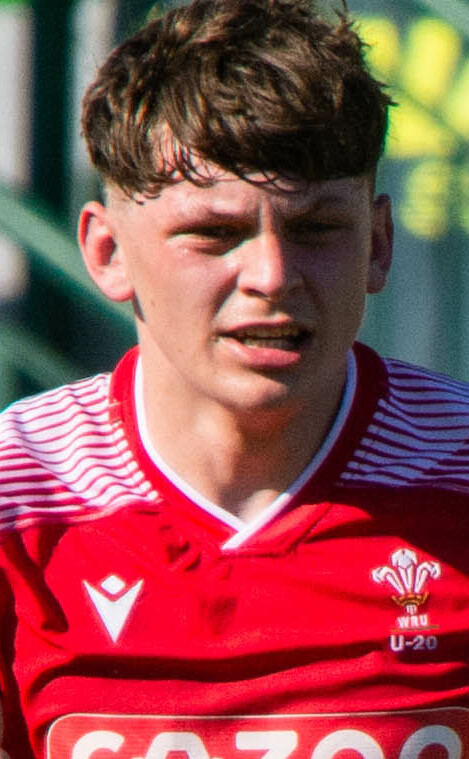
- Born: 2 February 2004 (age 22) Newport, Wales
- Height: 196 cm (6 ft 5 in)
- Weight: 115 kg (18 st 2 lb)

Rugby union career
- Position: Lock / Flanker
- Current team: Dragons
Youth career
- Caldicot RFC
Senior career
Years	Team	Apps	(Points)
2022–	Dragons	52	(5)
International career
Years	Team	Apps	(Points)
2022–2025	Wales U20	22	(5)
2026-	Wales	2	(0)

Ryan Woodman (born 2 February 2004) is a Welsh rugby union player, currently playing for the United Rugby Championship side, the Dragons. His preferred positions are lock or flanker.

== Professional career ==
Woodman was born in Newport and grew up in Caldicot, where he began playing rugby for Caldicot RFC. His family is originally from England but settled in Wales before he was born. Woodman came through the Dragons academy and debuted for the Dragons in 2022.

Woodman represented Wales U20 in 2022, before being named captain in 2023.
