= Eoghan Clarke =

Irish rugby union player (born 1998)

- Born: 12 June 1998 (age 28) Dublin, Ireland
- Height: 1.83 m (6 ft 0 in)
- Weight: 115 kg (18.1 st; 254 lb)
- School: C.B.C. Monkstown

Rugby union career
- Position: Hooker
Amateur team(s)
Years	Team	Apps	(Points)
- Seapoint RFC
2017–2020	Shannon RFC		
Senior career
Years	Team	Apps	(Points)
2021–2023	Jersey Reds	40	(75)
2023–2025	Munster	10	(5)
2025–	Saracens	0	(0)
- Correct as of 27 December 2024
International career
Years	Team	Apps	(Points)
2018	Ireland U20	3	(0)
- Correct as of 6 March 2024

Eoghan Clarke (born 12 June 1998) is an Irish rugby union player who plays as a hooker for Saracens in the Gallagher Premiership.

== Career ==
=== Early life ===
Clarke played his underage rugby at Seapoint RFC and C.B.C. Monkstown.

=== Munster Academy ===
Clarke joined the Munster Academy year one intake ahead of the 2018–19 season. He played with Shannon in the AIL, making his debut for Munster A in September 2018.

=== Jersey Reds ===
Clarke joined the Jersey Reds in 2021.

He made his debut in September 2021 and went on to be the joint top try scorer in the RFU Championship in the 2021/2022 season with 17 tries.

In 2023, he was part of the team that won the RFU Championship for the first time in Reds history. Following financial problems with the club which led to their liquidation in September 2023, he left the club having made 40 appearances.

=== Munster ===
Clarke rejoined Munster in October 2023 on a short-term contract.

He made his senior debut against Bayonne in the Champions Cup clash in December 2023 before making his URC debut against Leinster on St Stephen's Day.

He was re-signed by Munster for the 2024/25 season in February 2024.

=== Saracens ===
On 3 February 2025, Clarke would leave Munster with immediate effect to sign for English club Saracens in the Gallagher Premiership on a deal until the end of the 2025–26 season.

== Ireland ==
Clarke made three appearances for the Ireland under 20s during the 2018 Six Nations, with injuries resulting in him missing the Junior World Cup.
