= Seán O'Brien (rugby union, born 1998) =

Irish rugby union player

- Born: 12 May 1998 (age 28) County Westmeath, Ireland
- Height: 1.87 m (6 ft 1 1/2 in)
- Weight: 101 kg (15.9 st; 223 lb)

Rugby union career
- Position: Centre
Senior career
Years	Team	Apps	(Points)
2020–2021	Connacht	9	(5)
2021–2023	Exeter Chiefs	26	(15)
2023–	Munster	44	(50)
- Correct as of 24 October 2026
International career
Years	Team	Apps	(Points)
2018	Ireland U20	6	(0)

Seán O'Brien (born 12 May 1998) is an Irish rugby union player who plays as a centre for United Rugby Championship club Munster.

== Professional career ==
=== Connacht ===
O'Brien was named in the Connacht academy ahead of the 2020–21 season, and made his Connacht debut in round 9 of the 2020–21 Pro14 against Ulster.

=== Exeter Chiefs ===
O'Brien joined Premiership Rugby side Exeter Chiefs ahead of the 2021–22 season. O'Brien made his debut for the Chiefs on 14 November 2021.

=== Munster ===
O'Brien returned to Ireland to join United Rugby Championship club Munster on a two-year contract from the 2023–24 season.
