= Emmet Malone =

Irish football journalist

Emmet Malone is the Industry and Employment correspondent for the daily broadsheet newspaper, The Irish Times.

He formerly served as a football correspondent.

Malone attended University College Dublin and Dublin City University. He began his career as a freelance before joining the Irish Times staff in 1996. In 2001, he was appointed as the paper's football correspondent. He covers all major football competitions for the paper. In addition, he appears regularly on radio (RTÉ Radio and Newstalk).
