= Frank McCabe (businessman) =

Irish business executive (born 1937)

Frank McCabe (born 1937) is an Irish business executive who worked in the semiconductor business for over 40 years, ranging from the 1950s to the 1990s. He also spent several years as a member of various international Board of Directors and semi state boards in Ireland.

== Early life and education ==
McCabe was born in Ballybay, County Monaghan. He was educated at Christian Brothers College at Monkstown Park. Born into a family of engineers, he completed his bachelor of Engineering in University College Dublin and a MSc at Clarkson University, New York.

== Career ==
McCabe began his career at ASEA in Sweden. McCabe was responsible for the opening of General Electric plants in Dundalk early in his career. In 1979, he moved to Digital Equipment Corporation where he was CEO of their European semiconductors operations, and moved to the head office in Boston in 1983. He also served as chairman of the Shannon Development Authority, which brings investment to the southwest of Ireland.

In 1994, he moved to Intel, becoming senior Vice President and general manager for Ireland. He helped Intel build the Fab 14 plant. By the time of his retirement in 1990, 30% of all Pentium chips worldwide were manufactured from the Irish plant. He was responsible for the acquisition of his former company, Digital Equipment Corporation's semiconductor business.

Following his retirement from Intel he has served on various corporate and state boards including Citibank, the Science Foundation Arizona, and the Board of Science Foundation Ireland.
