= 2025–26 All-Ireland League (rugby union) =

34th season of All-Ireland League

- Countries: Ireland
- Number of teams: 50
- Date: 27 September 2025 – 26 April 2026
- Champions: St Mary's College (3rd title)
- Runners-up: Clontarf
- Promoted: Enniskillen
- Relegated: Belfast Harlequins
- Top point scorer: 1A Mick O'Gara (St Mary's College) – 187 points 1B Tom Larke (Old Wesley) – 172 points 2A Neil Byrne (MU Barnhall) – 133 points 2B Scott McLean (Rainey) – 135 points 2C Joey O'Connor (Clonmel) – 185 points
- Top try scorer: 1A Dylan Donnellan (Clontarf) – 17 tries 1B Bradley McNamara (Instonians) – 13 tries 2A Alan Flannery (Cashel) – 13 tries 2B Rob Deacy (Galwegians) – 15 tries 2C Cian O'Donoghue (Monkstown) – 17 tries

Official website
- www.irishrugby.ie/all-ireland-leagues-old/men/

The 2025–26 All-Ireland League, known as the Energia All-Ireland League for sponsorship reasons, was the 34th season of Irish Rugby's top level domestic competition. The League began on 27 September 2025 and finished with the League final at the Aviva Stadium, Dublin on 26 April 2026.

Clontarf were the defending champions having won their 4th title by defeating reigning champions Cork Constitution in the 2024–25 League Final. They reached the Final again but were beaten by St Mary's College who won their 3rd title. This was the fourth year in-a-row that the reigning champions lost the subsequent final.

Bective Rangers (after a 7-year absence) and Thomond (after a 6-year absence) made a return to the A.I.L. having been promoted from the Junior Provincial leagues replacing Tullamore and Omagh Academicals who were relegated.

Having played in the league since the club was founded in 1999, Belfast Harlequins were relegated from the league on the last day of the season. They will be replaced by Enniskillen who will make their league debut next season.

== Format ==
The League consisted of 5 divisions of 10 teams each playing a double round-robin competition using the standard Rugby union bonus points system. At the completion of the league phase the top 4 teams in Division 1A qualified for the play-off semi-finals, with the two winners meeting in the final.

Initially, the 10th placed teams in Divisions 1A, 1B, 2A and 2B were to be relegated to Divisions 1B, 2A, 2B and 2C respectively while the winners of Divisions 1B, 2A, 2B and 2C were to be promoted up one division. The 9th placed team in Division 1A along with the 2nd to 4th placed teams in Division 1B would enter a play-off competition with the winner to play in Division 1A for 2026–27. This same play-off competition was to apply to the other divisions also. However, in October the IRFU announced a structural change to the league for the 2026–27 season whereby Divisions 2B and 2C would be combined and then split along geographical lines creating two new divisions, 2B North (2BN) and 2B South (2BS). This meant there would be no promotion or relegation between divisions 2B and 2C this season.

The 10th placed team in Division 2C were to be relegated from the A.I.L. to their respective Provincial qualifying league and be replaced by the winner of the All-Ireland Provincial League Championship. The 9th placed team in Division 2C were to play the runner-up of the All-Ireland Provincial League Championship with the winner to play in Division 2B for 2026–27.

=== All-Ireland Provincial League Championship ===
The All-Ireland Provincial League Championship was contested by the winners of the four provincial qualifying leagues in Connacht, Leinster, Munster and Ulster. They played in two semi-finals with the winners meeting in the final, with all matches played at neutral venues. The winner will play in Division 2B of the A.I.L. for 2026–27. The runners-up were to play away against the 9th place team in Division 2C and the winner of this play-off will also play in Division 2B of the A.I.L. for 2026–27.

== Team changes ==
The following promotions and relegations occurred at the end of the 2024–25 season:

| | Promoted | Relegated |
| Division 1A | — | Garryowen, City of Armagh* |
| Division 1B | Old Belvedere, Nenagh Ormond* | Shannon |
| Division 2A | Instonians | Buccaneers, Navan* |
| Division 2B | Wanderers, Dungannon* | Malahide |
| Division 2C | Enniscorthy | Tullamore, Omagh Academicals* |
| A-I PLC | Bective Rangers, Thomond* | — |

* via play-offs

== Division 1A ==
Clontarf began their 13th consecutive season in the top division as reigning champions while last season's runners-up, Cork Constitution continued their ever presence in the league's topflight. Old Belvedere were back in Division 1A after 6 seasons while Nenagh Ormond became the first County Tipperary club to play in the league's top division. Their stay in Division 1A was short lived as they were relegated losing all 18 matches. For the first time since play-offs were introduced to decide the league champions, all four semi-finalists came from the same province (Leinster).

=== Teams ===
| Team | Location | Stadium | Capacity |
|---|---|---|---|
| Ballynahinch | Ballynahinch | Ballymacarn Park | 1,000 |
| Clontarf | Dublin (Clontarf) | Castle Avenue | 3,200 |
| Cork Constitution | Cork (Ballintemple) | Temple Hill | 1,000 |
| Lansdowne | Dublin (Ballsbridge) | Aviva Stadium (Back Pitch) | 1,000 |
| Nenagh Ormond | Nenagh | New Ormond Park | 1,000 |
| Old Belvedere | Dublin (Ballsbridge) | Ollie Campbell Park | 1,000 |
| St Mary's College | Dublin (Templeogue) | Templeville Road | 4,000 |
| Terenure College | Dublin (Terenure) | Lakelands Park | 3,000 |
| UCD | Dublin (Belfield) | UCD Bowl | 3,000 |
| Young Munster | Limerick (Rosbrien) | Tom Clifford Park | 1,000 |

Location of teams in the 2025–26 All-Ireland League Division 1A
Location of Dublin teams in the 2025–26 All-Ireland League Division 1A

=== Final table ===
| Pos | Team | Pld | W | D | L | PF | PA | PD | TF | TA | TB | LB | Pts | Qualification |
|---|---|---|---|---|---|---|---|---|---|---|---|---|---|---|
| 1 | St Mary's College (C) | 18 | 13 | 1 | 4 | 498 | 294 | +204 | 66 | 42 | 8 | 3 | 65 | Play-off semi-finals |
| 2 | Clontarf (L) | 18 | 13 | 0 | 5 | 506 | 413 | +93 | 75 | 56 | 10 | 2 | 64 | Play-off semi-finals |
| 3 | Lansdowne | 18 | 11 | 0 | 7 | 482 | 385 | +97 | 67 | 51 | 8 | 4 | 56 | Play-off semi-finals |
| 4 | Terenure College | 18 | 11 | 0 | 7 | 479 | 388 | +91 | 70 | 55 | 9 | 3 | 56 | Play-off semi-finals |
| 5 | Cork Constitution | 18 | 10 | 0 | 8 | 430 | 391 | +39 | 64 | 55 | 9 | 4 | 53 | |
| 6 | Young Munster | 18 | 8 | 0 | 10 | 533 | 446 | +87 | 76 | 64 | 10 | 7 | 49 | |
| 7 | Old Belvedere | 18 | 9 | 0 | 9 | 443 | 440 | +3 | 58 | 64 | 6 | 3 | 45 | |
| 8 | Ballynahinch | 18 | 8 | 1 | 9 | 434 | 397 | +37 | 61 | 53 | 7 | 3 | 44 | |
| 9 | UCD (W) | 18 | 6 | 0 | 12 | 425 | 637 | −212 | 63 | 95 | 6 | 2 | 32 | Division 1B Play-offs |
| 10 | Nenagh Ormond | 18 | 0 | 0 | 18 | 333 | 772 | −439 | 48 | 112 | 4 | 0 | 4 | Relegation to Division 1B |

Source: 2025–26 AIL Tables
Rules for classification: Tiebreakers for teams tied on points: 1) Difference between points for and against; 2) Number of matches won; 3) Number of matches drawn; 4) Most tries scored; 5) Most league points in matches involving tied teams.
(C) Champions; (L) Losing finalist; (W) Play-off winner

=== Results ===
| Home \ Away | BNH | CTF | CON | LAN | NOR | OBV | STM | TER | UCD | YMS |
|---|---|---|---|---|---|---|---|---|---|---|
| Ballynahinch | — | 20–24 | 28–26 | 34–13 | 47–0 | 38–12 | 0–14 | 12–52 | 57–19 | 35–33 |
| Clontarf | 21–16 | — | 24–27 | 20–17 | 35–24 | 54–51 | 10–14 | 29–24 | 29–12 | 28–26 |
| Cork Constitution | 12–25 | 3–17 | — | 38–12 | 42–19 | 21–15 | 19–57 | 42–14 | 26–7 | 19–18 |
| Lansdowne | 18–10 | 31–18 | 27–22 | — | 62–17 | 41–34 | 7–13 | 13–34 | 38–43 | 31–13 |
| Nenagh Ormond | 3–24 | 12–28 | 17–25 | 19–45 | — | 13–23 | 27–49 | 31–40 | 49–57 | 31–43 |
| Old Belvedere | 32–17 | 12–34 | 18–12 | 11–36 | 61–12 | — | 21–14 | 30–24 | 36–12 | 19–15 |
| St Mary's College | 16–16 | 32–21 | 27–26 | 0–14 | 49–15 | 34–17 | — | 28–21 | 59–12 | 20–22 |
| Terenure College | 52–22 | 31–15 | 21–5 | 3–22 | 40–12 | 27–19 | 14–12 | — | 19–15 | 19–29 |
| UCD | 28–21 | 28–48 | 19–36 | 20–15 | 45–22 | 14–19 | 24–45 | 15–24 | — | 34–12 |
| Young Munster | 22–12 | 33–50 | 26–29 | 35–40 | 57–10 | 22–13 | 8–15 | 37–20 | 82–21 | — |

Source: 2025–26 AIL fixtures & results
Legend: Blue = home team win; Yellow = draw; Red = away team win.

== Division 1B ==
Garryowen were back in Division 1B as they continued to yo-yo between the league's top two divisions. Also making the drop from Division 1A were City of Armagh after just 2 seasons in the topflight. Instonians played at this level for the first time since 2009 as they continued their remarkable run of four consecutive promotions last season. Old Wesley won the division and with it promotion to the top division for the first time in almost 30 years. After 3 seasons in 1B, Queen's were relegated back to Division 2A.

=== Teams ===
| Team | Location | Stadium | Capacity |
|---|---|---|---|
| Blackrock College | Dublin (Blackrock) | Stradbrook Road | 4,000 |
| City of Armagh | Armagh | Palace Grounds | 1,000 |
| Dublin University | Dublin | College Park | 200 |
| Garryowen | Limerick (Dooradoyle) | Dooradoyle | 1,500 |
| Highfield | Cork (Bishopstown) | Woodleigh Park | 4,000 |
| Instonians | Belfast | Shawsbridge Sports Complex | 1,000 |
| Naas | Naas | Forenaughts | 3,000 |
| Old Wesley | Dublin (Donnybrook) | Donnybrook Stadium | 7,000 |
| Queen's University | Belfast | Dub Lane | 1,000 |
| UCC | Cork (Mardyke) | Mardyke Arena | 5,000 |

Location of teams in the 2025–26 All-Ireland League Division 1B
Location of Dublin teams in the 2025–26 All-Ireland League Division 1B

=== Final table ===
| Pos | Team | Pld | W | D | L | PF | PA | PD | TF | TA | TB | LB | Pts | Qualification |
|---|---|---|---|---|---|---|---|---|---|---|---|---|---|---|
| 1 | Old Wesley | 18 | 14 | 0 | 4 | 540 | 355 | +185 | 77 | 51 | 11 | 2 | 69 | Promotion to Division 1A |
| 2 | Dublin University | 18 | 14 | 0 | 4 | 508 | 368 | +140 | 70 | 53 | 10 | 2 | 68 | Division 1B Play-offs |
| 3 | Instonians | 18 | 10 | 0 | 8 | 480 | 428 | +52 | 72 | 60 | 11 | 5 | 56 | Division 1B Play-offs |
| 4 | Garryowen | 18 | 9 | 1 | 8 | 480 | 422 | +58 | 73 | 64 | 9 | 5 | 52 | Division 1B Play-offs |
| 5 | Highfield | 18 | 9 | 0 | 9 | 382 | 402 | −20 | 53 | 57 | 5 | 5 | 46 | |
| 6 | Blackrock College | 18 | 8 | 0 | 10 | 427 | 440 | −13 | 62 | 63 | 8 | 5 | 45 | |
| 7 | City of Armagh | 18 | 9 | 0 | 9 | 412 | 437 | −25 | 59 | 65 | 7 | 2 | 45 | |
| 8 | Naas | 18 | 7 | 0 | 11 | 466 | 522 | −56 | 69 | 75 | 11 | 3 | 42 | |
| 9 | UCC (W) | 18 | 7 | 0 | 11 | 372 | 394 | −22 | 53 | 55 | 6 | 6 | 40 | Division 2A Play-offs |
| 10 | Queen's University | 18 | 2 | 1 | 15 | 315 | 614 | −299 | 48 | 92 | 5 | 5 | 20 | Relegation to Division 2A |

Source: 2025–26 AIL Tables
Rules for classification: Tiebreakers for teams tied on points: 1) Difference between points for and against; 2) Number of matches won; 3) Number of matches drawn; 4) Most tries scored; 5) Most league points in matches involving tied teams.
(W) Play-off winner

=== Results ===
| Home \ Away | BLK | ARM | DBU | GAR | HIF | INS | NAS | OWS | QUB | UCC |
|---|---|---|---|---|---|---|---|---|---|---|
| Blackrock College | — | 31–24 | 24–34 | 18–15 | 15–27 | 20–7 | 30–26 | 20–26 | 29–21 | 14–19 |
| City of Armagh | 12–27 | — | 28–19 | 15–29 | 25–12 | 23–17 | 47–33 | 0–45 | 22–16 | 26–5 |
| Dublin University | 36–26 | 26–17 | — | 31–29 | 19–26 | 29–26 | 21–18 | 27–7 | 48–26 | 13–12 |
| Garryowen | 31–28 | 48–29 | 21–27 | — | 10–15 | 37–14 | 19–24 | 17–41 | 63–21 | 22–19 |
| Highfield | 24–53 | 19–36 | 21–17 | 33–19 | — | 38–35 | 21–24 | 17–21 | 21–14 | 22–13 |
| Instonians | 42–18 | 29–14 | 12–29 | 33–36 | 17–15 | — | 32–13 | 36–14 | 29–22 | 19–17 |
| Naas | 32–20 | 24–17 | 26–40 | 14–28 | 19–14 | 47–26 | — | 15–33 | 46–28 | 24–34 |
| Old Wesley | 27–21 | 21–12 | 30–16 | 19–24 | 19–17 | 32–35 | 35–22 | — | 63–5 | 31–29 |
| Queen's University | 18–20 | 12–31 | 12–52 | 17–17 | 31–19 | 7–40 | 36–31 | 7–36 | — | 10–15 |
| UCC | 19–13 | 24–34 | 7–24 | 24–10 | 15–21 | 17–31 | 41–28 | 35–40 | 27–12 | — |

Source: 2025–26 AIL fixtures & results
Legend: Blue = home team win; Yellow = draw; Red = away team win.

== Division 2A ==
After two successive relegations Shannon played in the third tier of the A.I.L. for the first time in their history. Promoted up from Division 2B were Dungannon who returned to this level for the first time since the league was restructured 10 years ago, while Wanderers played at their highest level since returning to the league in 2014. MU Barnhall won the division with 16 points to spare and will now play in the 2nd tier of the A.I.L. for the first time in their history. With just a single victory Banbridge finished bottom and were relegated along with Old Crescent who lost their play-off match to Sligo.

=== Teams ===
| Team | Location | Stadium | Capacity |
|---|---|---|---|
| Ballymena | Antrim | Eaton Park | 1,000 |
| Banbridge | Banbridge | Rifle Park | 1,000 |
| Cashel | Cashel | Spafield | 2,500 |
| Dungannon | Dungannon | Stevenson Park | 1,000 |
| Galway Corinthians | Galway (Castlegar) | Corinthian Park | 1,000 |
| Greystones | Greystones | Dr Hickey Park | 1,000 |
| MU Barnhall | Leixlip | Parsonstown | 1,000 |
| Old Crescent | Limerick (Rosbrien) | Rosbrien | 4,000 |
| Shannon | Limerick | Thomond Park | 25,100 |
| Wanderers | Dublin (Ballsbridge) | Merrion Road | 1,000 |

Location of teams in the 2025–26 All-Ireland League Division 2A

=== Final table ===
| Pos | Team | Pld | W | D | L | PF | PA | PD | TF | TA | TB | LB | Pts | Qualification |
|---|---|---|---|---|---|---|---|---|---|---|---|---|---|---|
| 1 | MU Barnhall | 18 | 16 | 0 | 2 | 469 | 302 | +167 | 66 | 40 | 10 | 1 | 75 | Promotion to Division 1B |
| 2 | Shannon | 18 | 12 | 0 | 6 | 438 | 280 | +158 | 55 | 37 | 6 | 5 | 59 | Division 2A Play-offs |
| 3 | Dungannon | 18 | 11 | 1 | 6 | 415 | 406 | +9 | 57 | 52 | 7 | 2 | 55 | Division 2A Play-offs |
| 4 | Galway Corinthians | 18 | 11 | 0 | 7 | 366 | 291 | +75 | 52 | 39 | 6 | 4 | 54 | Division 2A Play-offs |
| 5 | Wanderers | 18 | 11 | 0 | 7 | 434 | 395 | +39 | 60 | 57 | 6 | 3 | 53 | |
| 6 | Cashel | 18 | 7 | 1 | 10 | 455 | 385 | +70 | 65 | 51 | 7 | 7 | 44 | |
| 7 | Ballymena | 18 | 9 | 0 | 9 | 355 | 404 | −49 | 47 | 57 | 4 | 4 | 44 | |
| 8 | Greystones | 18 | 6 | 0 | 12 | 363 | 423 | −60 | 50 | 59 | 5 | 7 | 36 | |
| 9 | Old Crescent (R) | 18 | 5 | 0 | 13 | 285 | 413 | −128 | 36 | 57 | 3 | 6 | 29 | Division 2B Play-offs |
| 10 | Banbridge | 18 | 1 | 0 | 17 | 268 | 549 | −281 | 39 | 78 | 3 | 5 | 12 | Relegation to Division 2B |

Source: 2025–26 AIL Tables
Rules for classification: Tiebreakers for teams tied on points: 1) Difference between points for and against; 2) Number of matches won; 3) Number of matches drawn; 4) Most tries scored; 5) Most league points in matches involving tied teams.
(R) Relegated

=== Results ===
| Home \ Away | BMA | BAN | CAS | DUN | GYC | GRE | MUB | OCR | SHN | WAN |
|---|---|---|---|---|---|---|---|---|---|---|
| Ballymena | — | 24–10 | 29–23 | 15–7 | 5–28 | 28–26 | 12–19 | 45–3 | 16–10 | 17–38 |
| Banbridge | 22–26 | — | 14–24 | 25–28 | 5–31 | 10–18 | 14–28 | 15–7 | 0–38 | 7–18 |
| Cashel | 20–22 | 73–14 | — | 25–25 | 12–5 | 19–25 | 15–41 | 10–18 | 12–24 | 19–26 |
| Dungannon | 30–10 | 24–21 | 33–21 | — | 18–17 | 33–14 | 7–28 | 17–13 | 22–14 | 32–38 |
| Galway Corinthians | 31–29 | 45–8 | 10–9 | 22–7 | — | 15–14 | 9–18 | 38–27 | 27–22 | 19–18 |
| Greystones | 22–24 | 29–19 | 7–26 | 24–31 | 36–27 | — | 24–31 | 10–13 | 7–10 | 36–26 |
| MU Barnhall | 41–20 | 32–12 | 35–40 | 51–31 | 15–8 | 11–3 | — | 10–7 | 24–17 | 26–20 |
| Old Crescent | 16–11 | 26–22 | 13–47 | 18–20 | 10–20 | 32–37 | 21–24 | — | 10–21 | 22–17 |
| Shannon | 41–10 | 37–31 | 19–26 | 23–19 | 21–0 | 30–10 | 28–12 | 27–12 | — | 34–17 |
| Wanderers | 17–12 | 41–19 | 25–24 | 17–31 | 17–14 | 38–21 | 14–23 | 22–17 | 25–22 | — |

Source: 2025–26 AIL fixtures & results
Legend: Blue = home team win; Yellow = draw; Red = away team win.

== Division 2B ==
Back-to-back relegations saw Buccaneers drop to 2B along with Navan who lost out in a play-off to Dungannon. After 2 seasons in the bottom division Enniscorthy returned to 2B. Having lost out on promotion via the play-offs the previous season Galwegians won the division and automatic promotion. After being relegated via the play-offs two seasons previously UL Bohemians won promotion back to Division 2A in the same manner.

=== Teams ===
| Team | Location | Stadium | Capacity |
|---|---|---|---|
| Buccaneers | Athlone | Dubarry Park | 10,000 |
| Clogher Valley | Fivemiletown | The Cran | 1,000 |
| Enniscorthy | Enniscorthy | Alcast Park | 1,000 |
| Galwegians | Galway (Renmore) | Crowley Park | 2,000 |
| Malone | Belfast | Gibson Park | 1,000 |
| Navan | Navan | Balreask Old | 4,000 |
| Rainey | Magherafelt | Hatrick Park | 1,000 |
| Skerries | Skerries | Holmpatrick | 1,000 |
| Sligo | Strandhill | Hamilton Park | 1,000 |
| UL Bohemians | Limerick (UL) | UL4G | 1,000 |

Location of teams in the 2025–26 All-Ireland League Division 2B

=== Final table ===
| Pos | Team | Pld | W | D | L | PF | PA | PD | TF | TA | TB | LB | Pts | Qualification |
|---|---|---|---|---|---|---|---|---|---|---|---|---|---|---|
| 1 | Galwegians | 18 | 16 | 0 | 2 | 605 | 265 | +340 | 93 | 36 | 14 | 0 | 78 | Promotion to Division 2A |
| 2 | UL Bohemians (W, P) | 18 | 13 | 0 | 5 | 588 | 364 | +224 | 87 | 52 | 13 | 3 | 68 | Division 2B Play-offs |
| 3 | Clogher Valley | 18 | 13 | 0 | 5 | 467 | 273 | +194 | 71 | 37 | 12 | 2 | 66 | Division 2B Play-offs |
| 4 | Sligo | 18 | 10 | 0 | 8 | 449 | 424 | +25 | 64 | 59 | 11 | 3 | 54 | Division 2B Play-offs |
| 5 | Malone | 18 | 9 | 0 | 9 | 437 | 476 | −39 | 64 | 72 | 9 | 3 | 48 | |
| 6 | Rainey | 18 | 9 | 0 | 9 | 389 | 426 | −37 | 52 | 61 | 6 | 3 | 45 | |
| 7 | Buccaneers | 18 | 6 | 0 | 12 | 348 | 504 | −156 | 49 | 74 | 6 | 5 | 35 | |
| 8 | Enniscorthy | 18 | 5 | 0 | 13 | 419 | 514 | −95 | 61 | 74 | 7 | 2 | 29 | |
| 9 | Navan | 18 | 4 | 1 | 13 | 333 | 514 | −181 | 47 | 76 | 4 | 4 | 26 | |
| 10 | Skerries | 18 | 4 | 1 | 13 | 304 | 579 | −275 | 40 | 87 | 2 | 2 | 22 | |

Source: 2025–26 AIL Tables
Rules for classification: Tiebreakers for teams tied on points: 1) Difference between points for and against; 2) Number of matches won; 3) Number of matches drawn; 4) Most tries scored; 5) Most league points in matches involving tied teams.
(P) Promoted; (W) Play-off winner

=== Results ===
| Home \ Away | BUC | CLV | ENS | GLW | MLN | NAV | RAI | SKR | SLG | ULB |
|---|---|---|---|---|---|---|---|---|---|---|
| Buccaneers | — | 7–45 | 26–33 | 17–38 | 27–22 | 8–20 | 15–7 | 33–14 | 26–33 | 10–14 |
| Clogher Valley | 43–14 | — | 31–0 | 12–31 | 19–21 | 33–15 | 19–14 | 26–0 | 27–26 | 21–29 |
| Enniscorthy | 21–29 | 20–26 | — | 14–28 | 36–25 | 45–5 | 34–24 | 52–19 | 12–42 | 10–21 |
| Galwegians | 7–20 | 0–31 | 41–24 | — | 24–15 | 50–15 | 40–12 | 61–0 | 48–8 | 19–14 |
| Malone | 22–27 | 24–15 | 26–17 | 15–40 | — | 22–17 | 20–37 | 14–17 | 29–25 | 30–29 |
| Navan | 38–10 | 14–24 | 32–29 | 3–24 | 34–35 | — | 10–19 | 20–20 | 30–29 | 21–33 |
| Rainey | 23–22 | 13–15 | 31–14 | 30–40 | 22–13 | 24–19 | — | 33–21 | 19–22 | 26–24 |
| Skerries | 25–23 | 10–28 | 38–26 | 14–52 | 31–52 | 20–17 | 14–17 | — | 17–31 | 20–31 |
| Sligo | 29–12 | 0–24 | 39–15 | 0–19 | 19–35 | 35–18 | 31–21 | 39–7 | — | 24–13 |
| UL Bohemians | 70–22 | 35–28 | 31–17 | 21–43 | 40–17 | 54–5 | 53–17 | 24–17 | 52–17 | — |

Source: 2025–26 AIL fixtures & results
Legend: Blue = home team win; Yellow = draw; Red = away team win.

== Division 2C ==
After 4 seasons in 2B Malahide returned to the bottom division while Bective Rangers and Thomond returned to the A.I.L. after 7 and 6 years respectively in the Junior leagues. Clonmel finished top of the table and won the divisional title with a play-off Final win over Bective Rangers. Having been ever present in the league since the club was founded in 1999, Belfast Harlequins were relegated on the last day of the season on points difference.

=== Teams ===
| Team | Location | Stadium | Capacity |
|---|---|---|---|
| Ballyclare | Ballyclare | The Cloughan | 1,000 |
| Bective Rangers | Dublin (Donnybrook) | Donnybrook Stadium | 6,000 |
| Belfast Harlequins | Belfast | Deramore Park | 1,000 |
| Bruff | Bruff | Kilballyowen Park | 2,000 |
| Clonmel | Clonmel | Ard Gaoithe | 4,000 |
| Dolphin | Cork (Ballyphehane) | Musgrave Park | 8,008 |
| Malahide | Malahide | Estuary Road | 1,000 |
| Midleton | Midleton | Towns Park | 400 |
| Monkstown | Dublin (Sandymount) | Sydney Parade | 1,000 |
| Thomond | Limerick (Moyross) | Liam Fitzgerald Park | 1,000 |

Location of teams in the 2025–26 All-Ireland League Division 2C
Location of Dublin teams in the 2025–26 All-Ireland League Division 2C

=== Final table ===
| Pos | Team | Pld | W | D | L | PF | PA | PD | TF | TA | TB | LB | Pts | Qualification |
|---|---|---|---|---|---|---|---|---|---|---|---|---|---|---|
| 1 | Clonmel (W, C) | 18 | 14 | 0 | 4 | 553 | 390 | +163 | 77 | 57 | 11 | 2 | 69 | Division 2C Play-offs |
| 2 | Bective Rangers | 18 | 12 | 0 | 6 | 572 | 408 | +164 | 90 | 57 | 15 | 4 | 67 | Division 2C Play-offs |
| 3 | Thomond | 18 | 12 | 0 | 6 | 480 | 401 | +79 | 69 | 55 | 9 | 2 | 59 | Division 2C Play-offs |
| 4 | Dolphin | 18 | 11 | 0 | 7 | 492 | 427 | +65 | 73 | 62 | 10 | 2 | 56 | Division 2C Play-offs |
| 5 | Monkstown | 18 | 10 | 0 | 8 | 507 | 418 | +89 | 73 | 62 | 8 | 3 | 51 | |
| 6 | Ballyclare | 18 | 7 | 1 | 10 | 460 | 480 | −20 | 66 | 66 | 10 | 5 | 45 | |
| 7 | Midleton | 18 | 7 | 0 | 11 | 413 | 424 | −11 | 60 | 59 | 6 | 6 | 40 | |
| 8 | Bruff | 18 | 7 | 0 | 11 | 397 | 488 | −91 | 52 | 69 | 6 | 4 | 38 | |
| 9 | Malahide (W) | 18 | 4 | 0 | 14 | 409 | 564 | −155 | 57 | 83 | 7 | 5 | 28 | Provincial League Play-off |
| 10 | Belfast Harlequins | 18 | 5 | 1 | 12 | 338 | 621 | −283 | 49 | 93 | 4 | 2 | 28 | Relegation to Provincial League |

Source: 2025–26 AIL Tables
Rules for classification: Tiebreakers for teams tied on points: 1) Difference between points for and against; 2) Number of matches won; 3) Number of matches drawn; 4) Most tries scored; 5) Most league points in matches involving tied teams.
(C) Champions; (W) Play-off winner

=== Results ===
| Home \ Away | BCL | BEC | BHQ | BRF | CML | DOL | MLD | MID | MNK | THO |
|---|---|---|---|---|---|---|---|---|---|---|
| Ballyclare | — | 45–42 | 34–19 | 37–7 | 29–32 | 38–48 | 31–27 | 27–22 | 34–43 | 5–29 |
| Bective Rangers | 36–17 | — | 37–14 | 57–40 | 34–33 | 29–24 | 33–7 | 22–7 | 34–21 | 30–12 |
| Belfast Harlequins | 24–24 | 24–13 | — | 28–38 | 12–42 | 33–24 | 22–36 | 24–22 | 29–21 | 12–15 |
| Bruff | 19–34 | 25–15 | 30–25 | — | 19–18 | 21–15 | 32–31 | 14–26 | 28–19 | 17–20 |
| Clonmel | 33–27 | 24–20 | 66–14 | 22–20 | — | 21–33 | 39–14 | 31–17 | 35–11 | 24–22 |
| Dolphin | 28–7 | 14–35 | 31–14 | 22–3 | 32–19 | — | 25–22 | 26–19 | 36–14 | 54–28 |
| Malahide | 8–21 | 17–52 | 17–19 | 21–15 | 36–42 | 24–15 | — | 15–24 | 31–25 | 25–35 |
| Midleton | 25–23 | 34–33 | 48–5 | 40–25 | 21–29 | 17–20 | 43–34 | — | 15–19 | 11–13 |
| Monkstown | 21–17 | 21–28 | 68–10 | 36–24 | 10–14 | 29–13 | 57–20 | 33–5 | — | 40–28 |
| Thomond | 17–10 | 29–22 | 55–10 | 22–20 | 19–29 | 54–32 | 34–24 | 31–17 | 17–19 | — |

Source: 2025–26 AIL fixtures & results
Legend: Blue = home team win; Yellow = draw; Red = away team win.

== Play-offs ==
=== Division 1A Play-offs ===
Semi-finals

18 April 2026
14:00 IST (UTC+1)
Semi-final 1

| St Mary's College | 20 - 13 | Terenure College |
| Try: D Leane 20'; C Deane 37'c R Bergin 65'; Con: M O'Gara 37'; Pen: M O'Gara 80' | Report | Try: A La Grue 30'c Con: C Cosgrave 30'; Pen: C Cosgrave 3'; C Gabriel 71' |

Templeville Road
Referee: Andrew Cole (IRFU)

18 April 2026
16:00 IST (UTC+1)
Semi-final 2

| Clontarf | 39 - 28 | Lansdowne |
| Try: F Gilbert 14'c J Coghlan 33'c H Cooney 36'c D Magner 46'c D Donnellan 59'; Con: C Kelly 14', 33', 36', 46'; Pen: C Kelly 54', 70' | Report | Try: J Beukes 18'c, 78'c B Sheehan 24'c B Fitzpatrick 62'c Con: S Madigan 18', 24'; C Tector 62', 78' |

Castle Avenue
Referee: Keane Davison (IRFU)

All-Ireland League Final
See below.

=== Division 1B Play-offs ===
Semi-finals

18 April 2026
14:30 IST (UTC+1)
Semi-final 1

| UCD | 35 - 24 | Garryowen |
| Try: C Moloney; D Hurley; P Clancy; D Maguire; T Quinn; Con: P Clancy (5) | Report | Try: S Sexton; B Fitzgerald; M Clein; F McCall; Con: L Stewart (2) |

UCD Bowl
Referee: Daniel Carson (IRFU)

18 April 2026
14:30 IST (UTC+1)
Semi-final 2

| Dublin University | 32 - 21 | Instonians |
| Try: D Walsh; J O'Sullivan; O Crowley; H Goddard; Con: M Lynch; Z Quirke (2); Pen: M Lynch (2) | Report | Try: O Clarke; B McNamara; J Eagleson; Con: J Eahleson (3) |

College Park
Referee: Padraic Reidy (IRFU)

Play-off Final

25 April 2026
14:30 IST (UTC+1)
Final

| UCD | 28 -24 | Dublin University |
| Try: A Osborne; S Bishti; B Brownlee; Con: P Clancy (2); Pen: P Clancy (3) | Report | Try: H Deane-Johns; J O'Sullivan; A Finlay; Con: M Lynch (3); Pen: M Lynch |

UCD Bowl
Referee: Keane Davison (IRFU)

- UCD retain Division 1A status

=== Division 2A Play-offs ===
Semi-finals

18 April 2026
14:30 IST (UTC+1)
Semi-final 1

| UCC | 40 - 10 | Galway Corinthians |
| Try: E Clarke; T O'Callaghan; C O'Shea; G O'Leary Kareem; D McCarthy; C Ryan; Con: C O'Shea (5) | Report | Try: E Conlon; T Waters |

Mardyke Arena
Referee: Max Weston (IRFU)

18 April 2026
14:30 IST (UTC+1)
Semi-final 2

| Shannon | 34 - 22 | Dungannon |
| Try: O Minogue (4); Con: J Gavin (4); Pen: J Gavin (2) | Report | Try: J Gamble (2); S Montgomery; Con: B McCaughey (2); Pen: B McCaughey |

Thomond Park
Referee: Jack MacNeice (IRFU)

Play-off Final

25 April 2026
14:30 IST (UTC+1)
Final

| UCC | 31 - 12* | Shannon |
| Try: G Kareem; T O'Callaghan; H Murphy; D McCarthy; C Bennett; Con: C O'Shea (3) | Report | Try: H Long; J Gavin; Con: J Gavin |

Mardyke Arena
Referee: Padraic Reidy (IRFU)

* Match abandoned after 60mins due to serious injury with the score at 31-12 to UCC. The IRFU National Competitions Committee subsequently determined that the score of the match at the time of the abandonment would stand. This was accepted by both clubs. UCC therefore retain their Division 1B status.

=== Division 2B Play-offs ===
Semi-finals

18 April 2026
14:30 IST (UTC+1)
Semi-final 1

| Old Crescent | 10 - 16 | Sligo |
| Try: J McEnery; Con: J Williams; Pen: J Williams | Report | Try: A Czeck (2); Pen: C O'Neill (2) |

Rosbrien
Referee: Jonny Erskine (IRFU)

- Old Crescent relegated to Division 2B

18 April 2026
14:30 IST (UTC+1)
Semi-final 2

| UL Bohemians | 27 - 15 | Clogher Valley |
| Try: L Neilan; K Dineen; J Mills; D Ferrar; Con: C Casey (2); Pen: C Casey | Report | Try: Matthew Bothwell; Michael Bothwell; Con: D Maxwell; Pen: D Maxwell |

UL4G
Referee: Sam Holt (IRFU)

Play-off Final

25 April 2026
14:30 IST (UTC+1)
Final

| UL Bohemians | 58 - 33 | Sligo |
| Try: K Dineen (2); D O'Gorman; O Fagan; G Fitzgerald; D Ferrar (2); L O'Shanahan; Con: C Casey (6); Pen: C Casey (2) | Report | Try: C O'Neill; Penalty try M McGlynn (2); L Timms; Con: C O'Neill (3) |

UL4G
Referee: Max Weston (IRFU)

- UL Bohemians promoted to Division 2A

=== Division 2C Play-offs ===
Semi-finals

18 April 2026
14:30 IST (UTC+1)
Semi-final 1

| Clonmel | 44 - 17 | Dolphin |
| Try: F Davies (3); H Buttimer; L Hogan; Con: J O'Connor (5); Pen: J O'Connor (3) | Report | Try: S Boyle; C O'Donnell; D Buckley; Con: H Yarrell |

Ard Gaoithe
Referee: Rob McGreer (IRFU)

18 April 2026
14:30 IST (UTC+1)
Semi-final 2

| Bective Rangers | 21 - 13 | Thomond |
| Try: B Holland; C Poole; Con: M Gilsenan; Pen: M Gilsenan (3) | Report | Try: S Birrane; Con: E Cusack; Pen: E Cusack (2) |

Donnybrook Stadium
Referee: Ross Whitfield (IRFU)

Play-off Final

25 April 2026
14:30 IST (UTC+1)
Final

| Clonmel | 28 - 24 | Bective Rangers |
| Try: F Davies (3); L Hogan; Con: J O'Connor (4) | Report | Try: D McPolin; C Hennessy; O McCloskey; C Poole; Con: M Gilsenan (2) |

Ard Gaoithe
Referee: Stuart Gaffikin (IRFU)

=== Provincial League Championship ===
Semi-finals

28 March 2026
13:00 WET (UTC+0)
Semi-final 1

| Boyne (Leinster) | 36 - 28 | Kilfeacle & District ( Munster) |
| Try: A Brodigan; J Mitchell; E Duffy; Con: K Keogh (2); Pen: K Keogh (4) | Report | Try: R Doody; J an Wyndgaardt (2); M Lambe; Con: L Heuston (4) |

Shay Murtagh Park, Mullingar
Referee: Chris Elliott (IRFU)

28 March 2026
15:00 WET (UTC+0)
Semi-final 2

| Enniskillen (Ulster) | 33 - 8 | Creggs ( Connacht) |
| Try: H Keys; J Carleton; D Hill; J Ferguson; E Keys; Con: E Keys (4) | Report | Try: J Fleming; Pen: R Dowd |

Shay Murtagh Park, Mullingar
Referee: Brían Bennett (IRFU)

Final

11 April 2026
14:30 BST (UTC+1)
Final

| Boyne (Leinster) | 8 - 46 | Enniskillen (Ulster) |
| Try: A Brodigan; Pen: K Keogh | Report | Try: C Balfour; H Keys; J Trotter; C Logan; Steve Balfour; Sam Balfour; Con: E Keys (5); Pen: E Keys (2) |

Palace Grounds, Armagh
Referee: Paul O'Connor (IRFU)

- Enniskillen promoted to All-Ireland League

Play-off

25 April 2026
14:30 IST (UTC+1)
Play-off

| Malahide | 29 - 24 | Boyne |
| Try: J Hurley; J McKeown; D Hayes; C Daly; Con: D O'Halloran (3); Pen: D O'Halloran | Report | Try: M Briscoe; R Kindlon; E Duffy; Con: B Duffy (3); Pen: K Keogh |

Estuary Road

- Malahide retain All-Ireland League status

== Final ==
The All-Ireland League final took place on Sunday, 26 April 2026, at the Aviva Stadium, Dublin. St Mary's College played in the Final for the first time in 16 years. Their opponents were reigning Champions Clontarf, who appeared in their 10th final out of the last 12 seasons. The match was broadcast live on TG4 television. St Mary's claimed their 3rd title with a 46-31 victory in what was the highest scoring A.I.L. final in history.

=== All-Ireland League Final ===
26 April 2026
16:00 IST (UTC+1)

| St Mary's College | 46 - 31 | Clontarf |
| Try: M Carey 13'c L Ramirez 22'; M McCormick 44'c R Shields 51'c J Gimblett 58'c C Dean 76'c Con: M O'Gara 13', 44', 51', 58', 76'; Pen: M O'Gara 8', 63' | Report | Try: J Coghlan 4'c, 78'c A Coleman 20', 66'; H Cooney 56'c Con: C Kelly 4', 57', 78' |

Aviva Stadium
Attendance: 6,894
Referee: Daniel Carson (IRFU)

| St Mary's College | Clontarf |

| FB | 15 | Ruairi Shields |
| RW | 14 | Aaron O'Sullivan | (substituted off) 75' |
| OC | 13 | Myles Carey |
| IC | 12 | Mick O'Gara |
| LW | 11 | Leandro Ramirez | (substituted off) 59' |
| FH | 10 | Conor Dean (c) |
| SH | 9 | Rob Gilsenan |
| LP | 1 | Tom O'Reilly | (substituted off) 52' |
| HK | 2 | Jack Nelson Murray | (substituted off) 57' |
| TP | 3 | Mick McCormick | (substituted off) 52' |
| RL | 4 | Greg Jones |
| LL | 5 | Daniel Leane | (substituted off) 68' |
| BF | 6 | Joch Gimblett |
| OF | 7 | Ronan Watters | | (substituted off) 71' |
| N8 | 8 | Dan Goggin | (substituted off) 52' | (substituted on) 70' |
Substitutes:
| HK | 16 | Richie Bergin | (substituted on) 57' |
| PR | 17 | Oisin Michel | (substituted on) 52' |
| PR | 18 | Andrew Sparrow | (substituted on) 52' |
| LK | 19 | Conor Pierce | (substituted on) 68' |
| BR | 20 | Ethan Baxter |
| BR | 21 | Finn Burke | (substituted on) 52' |
| CR | 22 | Mark Fogarty | (substituted on) 59' |
| WR | 23 | Steven Kilgallen | (substituted on) 75' |
Coach:
(Ireland) Mark McHugh

| FB | 15 | Tadhg Byrd |
| RW | 14 | Dylan O'Grady | | (substituted off) 68' | (substituted on) 74' |
| OC | 13 | Hugh Cooney |
| IC | 12 | Daniel Hawkshaw | | (substituted off) 68' |
| LW | 11 | Alex O'Grady | | (substituted off) 52' |
| FH | 10 | Conor Kelly | (yellow card) 62' |
| SH | 9 | Sam Owens | | | (substituted off) 74' |
| LP | 1 | Ivan Soroka | | (substituted off) 77' |
| HK | 2 | Dylan Donnellan (c) |
| TP | 3 | Charlie Ward | | (substituted off) 60' |
| RL | 4 | Fionn Gilbert |
| LL | 5 | Jim Peters |
| BF | 6 | Paul Deeny | | (substituted off) 52' |
| OF | 7 | Aaron Coleman | | (substituted off) 70' |
| N8 | 8 | Josh Coghlan |
Substitutes:
| HK | 16 | Declan Adamson | | (substituted on) 70' |
| PR | 17 | Alvin Amaniampong | | (substituted on) 77' |
| BR | 18 | Richie Whelan | | (substituted on) 52' |
| WR | 19 | Michael Moloney | | (substituted on) 68' |
| WR | 20 | Dan Magner | | (substituted on) 52' |
| CR | 21 | Conor Gibney | | (substituted on) 68' |
| LK | 22 | Darragh Doyle |
| PR | 23 | Conor Bateman | | (substituted on) 60' |
Coach:
(Ireland) Andy Wood

Player of the match:
Myles Carey

Assistant Referees:

Jonny Erskine (IRFU)
Stuart Douglas (IRFU)
Television match official:

Colin Stanley (IRFU)

== See also ==
- Bateman Cup
- Connacht Senior League
- Leinster Senior League
- Munster Senior League
- Ulster Senior League
