= Kilfeacle and District RFC =

Irish rugby union club in Kilfeacle, Co.Tipperary

(Republic of Ireland) Kilfeacle & District RFC
- Full name: Kilfeacle & District Rugby Football Club
- Union: (Ireland) IRFU
- Branch: Munster
- Nickname: The Hill
- Founded: 1981; 45 years ago
- Location: Kilfeacle
- Region: County Tipperary
- Ground: Morrissey Park
- President: Jamie Keaty
- League: Munster Junior League
Team kit

Kilfeacle & District Rugby Football Club is an amateur rugby union club based in the village of Kilfeacle, County Tipperary. The club was founded in 1981. Today, the club's playing grounds, called Morrissey Park, or more affectionately known as "The Hill", are located in the village of Kilfeacle, 7 kilometres (4 mi) east of Tipperary town on the N74 Tipperary to Cashel road.

The club has over 300 playing and non-playing members. The teams range in age from under 6 to under 18, which compete in East Munster competitions . The club also has 2 adult teams: First XV, Second XV. The Second team compete in a number of competitions: Gleeson League Division 2, Evans League, Webb Cup, and Gleeson Cup. The First team currently compete in the First Division of the Munster Junior League. There are also 2 more provincial cup competitions which the team annually participate; Munster Junior Cup, and Munster Junior Clubs Challenge Cup. The Mansergh Cup and Garryowen Cup are a competitions for men's rugby teams in County Tipperary, which Kilfeacle annually participate in. Kilfeacle were affectionately labelled as 'Kill-People' by Paul O Connell in a Sunday Newspaper Interview.

== History ==
Kilfeacle & District were formed in 1981 as a breakaway club from Clanwilliam, who were based in Tipperary town, when they relocated to the village of Kilfeacle. They added 'District' to the club's name as they had players from several towns and villages in the surrounding area.

The club won its first trophy in 1985 when they won the Garryowen Cup. 10 years later they won the Munster Junior League for the first time as well as the Munster Junior Clubs Challenge Cup. Back to back defeats in the finals of the Munster Junior Cup came in 1999 and 2000 before the club won the cup for the first and so far only time in 2002 with victory over Crosshaven.

Another Munster Junior Clubs Challenge Cup title came in 2009–10 against Clonmel and in 2013 the club won another Garryowen Cup with victory over Nenagh Ormond in the final. A fourth Junior Clubs Challenge Cup title was won in 2016–17 against Bandon before the club reached the final of the All-Ireland Junior Cup the following season, losing to Ashbourne. The 2019–20 season proved to be the club's most successful one to date as they won the All-Ireland Junior Cup in January defeating Ulster's Dromore and then captured the Munster Junior League title for the second time, resulting in the club winning the Munster Junior Club of the Year award.

Successive final appearances in the Munster Junior Cup in 2023 and 2024 resulted in defeats. The 2025–26 season proved very successful for the club as they won their third Munster Junior League title with two games to spare and a week later won the Garryowen Cup with victory over Thurles. They finished their season with another trophy, defeating Bandon to win their 5th Munster Junior Club Challenge Cup title.

== Honours ==
- All-Ireland Junior Cup: (1)
  - 2019–20
- Munster Junior Cup: (1)
  - 2002
- Munster Junior League: (3)
  - 1994–95, 2019–20, 2025–26
- Munster Junior Clubs Challenge Cup: (5)
  - ?, 1994–95, 2009–10, 2016–17, 2025–26
- Garryowen Cup: (3)
  - 1985, 2013, 2026
