= Bandon R.F.C. =

Irish rugby union club, based in Bandon, County Cork

(Ireland) Bandon
- Full name: Bandon Rugby Football Club
- Union: IRFU; Munster
- Founded: 1882; 144 years ago
- Ground(s): Old Chapel, Bandon
- President: Dan Murphy
Team kit

Bandon Rugby Football Club is an Irish rugby union club. They play in Division 1 of the Munster Junior League.

== History ==
Bandon were playing rugby matches during the 1870s against Montenotte, Waterloo, Queenstown and Cork Bankers. By 1880, regular fixtures were being played against Cork Bankers, Cork County and Queen's University. In 1882, Bandon became affiliated with the Irish Rugby Football Union; for this reason, 1882 is the year the club was 'officially' founded.

In 1886, Bandon were the inaugural winners of the Munster Senior Cup, defeating Limerick club Garryowen in the final, though in the years that followed, Bandon ceased playing competitive rugby matches. Following World War I and the Irish War of Independence, Bandon was re-organised by Jim Neville, a solicitor. In the 1926–27 season, Bandon resumed competitive rugby, playing in the Cork County Cup. In 1928, wearing their new blue and white striped jerseys, Bandon defeated UCC in the final of the Minor Cup, becoming the first club from outside of Cork city to win the cup, and in 1929 they won the O'Neill Cup, defeating Kinsale in the final.

A struggling national economy and emigration meant that Bandon ceased playing rugby altogether by 1937, yet efforts to rebuild the club were successful, with a mixture of old players and youngsters new to the sport rejuvenating the club. At this time, the old Devonshire Arms Hotel was used as a base, and the club also changed its name to Bandon Harlequins. A friendly match against the British Army garrison in Camden Fort Meagher in the summer of 1938 was possibly the last rugby match played in Ireland between 'natives' and British soldiers, before the British left a few weeks later. Rugby was somewhat suspended during World War II due to the lack of petrol, but play resumed in 1946, with Bandon dropping Harlequins from its name. In 1952, Bandon won further O'Neill and County Cups, and in 1956 the club went on its first tour, playing Dublin side Old Wesley.

In 1963, Bandon again completed an O'Neill and County Cup double, and in 1968 they reached the final of the Munster Junior Cup for the first time, losing to Highfield. During 1972–77, Bandon had the most successful junior side in Cork. The O'Neill Cup was won for five successive season, the Quinlan Cup was won on four occasion's and, in the 1974–75 season, Bandon earned itself the title "Kings of the County" after winning the O'Neill, Quinlan and County Cups. They repeated the feat in 1980–81. In 1982, the club's centenary, they began playing at a new sports complex, Old Chapel.

Bandon now compete in the Munster Junior League. They won the league during the 1992–93 season, but since then have bounced between divisions 1 and 2. In 2013, Bandon's under-19s won an All-Ireland Cup, whilst in 2017 the club won its first Munster Junior Cup, defeating Young Munster 27–14 in the final. This success came just one year after French coach Régis Sonnes had joined Bandon on a two-year contract from Bordeaux.

Sonnes, who played for Toulouse, Brive and Agen during his career, also coached at Bandon Grammar School, having started his coaching career with Agen before moving to Narbonne, CRC Madrid and the Spanish national team. Following on from the Junior Cup success in 2017, Bandon won the Munster Junior League Division 1 title in 2018.

The club currently has around 350 players and 65 coaches on the books, and has various underage teams and a growing women's team. The club experienced tragedy in January 2020, when member Cameron Blair was murdered.

== Honours ==
- Munster Senior Cup: 1886
- Munster Junior Cup: 2017
- Munster Junior League: 1992–93, 2017–18
