= Clonakilty R.F.C. =

Irish rugby union club, based in Clonakilty

(Ireland) Clonakilty
- Full name: Clonakilty Rugby Football Club
- Union: IRFU; Munster
- Founded: 1977
- Ground(s): The Vale, Shannon Vale Cross, Clonakilty (Capacity: ~600)
Team kit

Clonakilty Rugby Football Club (Clonakilty RFC) is an Irish rugby union club. The club fields teams in Division 1 of the Munster Junior League. The club, in its current form, was established at a meeting in the Kilty Stone Tavern in 1977.

== History ==
Rugby has been played in the Clonakilty area since at least the late 19th century when, in 1890, a side representing Clonakilty competed in the Munster Senior Cup for the first time. This club played their games in The Showgrounds but disbanded in the early 1900s. While Clonakilty RFC was reformed in the 1930s, the club disbanded again before the Second World War. Clonakilty Rugby Club, in its current form, was established following a meeting at the Kilty Stone Tavern in 1977.

The club commenced competitive rugby at Minor A level and won its first trophy, the Dromleena Cup in 1978. Following victories in 1980 and 1982 in the Minor A league, it was decided to move up to Junior grade in 1982/83.

The O'Neill Cup was won in the 1995/96 season (against Bandon in the final) and the Junior 1 team won promotion to the 1st Division as well as winning two local cups and the annual "Jimmy Blewitt Memorial Cup" played between Clonakilty and Donaghadee.

In 2001, Clonakilty reached the top of Munster regional rugby and obtained promotion through a round-robin league by winning over champion sides of the three other provinces. Since then, the club won the title of the Senior Third Division in 2006. Promoted to Senior second division, the club secured a third place finish the following season (2007) in the Second Division. In the following five years the team won several trophies and expanded fan attendance.

This period came to an end in 2013 when Clonakilty were relegated back to junior status for the first time in nine years. The club had struggled all season long, with the countrywide recession hitting the town hard, forcing a number of players to move abroad and resulting in a drop in numbers in the adult squad.

The club's youth division has had several successes. In 2013, the Under 17s won The Munster league, almost repeating the same result a year later, with a number of that squad playing underage rugby with Munster and the Irish National team.

As of 2014, Clonakilty Rugby Football Club were fielding a team in Division 1 of the Junior League, with three three men's adult teams and under 20s two 2 ladies' teams and a range of underage teams from under 8s to under 18s.

== Honours ==
- AIL Division 3: 2005/2006
- AIB Junior Round Robin: 2000/2001
- Munster Junior Cup: 2000/2001
- Munster Junior League Division 1: 2000/2001
- Munster Junior League Division 2: 1999/2000
