= Munster Senior Cup =

Munster Senior Cup may refer to:

- Munster Senior Cup (association football)
- Munster Senior Cup (rugby union)
- Munster Schools Rugby Senior Cup
