= 2024–25 All-Ireland League (rugby union) =

33rd season of All-Ireland League

- Countries: Ireland
- Number of teams: 50
- Date: 20 September 2024 – 27 April 2025
- Champions: Clontarf (4th title)
- Runners-up: Cork Constitution
- Promoted: Bective Rangers, Thomond
- Relegated: Tullamore, Omagh Academicals
- Top point scorer: 1A Conor Kelly (Clontarf) – 188 points 1B Conor McMahon (Nenagh Ormond) – 162 points 2A Josh Eagleson (Instonians) – 170 points 2B Ben McCaughey (Dungannon) – 168 points 2C Joey O'Connor (Clonmel) – 204 points
- Top try scorer: 1A Dylan Donnellan (Clontarf) – 15 tries 1B Calum Dowling & Jack Keating (Old Belvedere) – 15 tries 2A Bevan Prinsloo (Instonians) – 22 tries 2B Callum Smyton (Clogher Valley) – 13 tries 2C JB du Toit (Midleton) – 15 tries

Official website
- www.irishrugby.ie/all-ireland-leagues-old/men/

The 2024–25 All-Ireland League, known as the Energia All-Ireland League for sponsorship reasons, was the 33rd season of Irish Rugby's top level domestic competition. The League began on 20 September 2024 and finished with the League final at the Aviva Stadium, Dublin on 27 April 2025.

Cork Constitution were the defending champions having won their 7th title by defeating defending champions Terenure College in the 2023-24 League Final. They reached the final again but were defeated by Clontarf who won their fourth A.I.L. title.

Ballyclare were competing in the League for the first time ever after gaining promotion to Division 2C by winning the Provincial League Championship final. Monkstown who lost that final, later gained promotion back to the League after a 21-year absence by winning the Provincial League Championship play-off against Bangor.

== Format ==
The League consisted of 5 divisions of 10 teams each playing a double round-robin competition using the standard Rugby union bonus points system. At the completion of the league phase the top 4 teams in Division 1A would qualify for the play-off semi-finals, with the two winners meeting in the final.

The 10th placed teams in Divisions 1A, 1B, 2A and 2B would be relegated to Divisions 1B, 2A, 2B and 2C respectively while the winners of Divisions 1B, 2A, 2B and 2C would be promoted up one division. The 9th placed team in Division 1A along with the 2nd to 4th placed teams in Division 1B would enter a play-off competition with the winner to play in Division 1A for 2025–26. This same play-off competition applied to the other divisions also.

The 10th placed team in Division 2C would be relegated from the A.I.L. to their respective Provincial qualifying league and be replaced by the winner of the All-Ireland Provincial League Championship. The 9th placed team in Division 2C would play the runner-up of the All-Ireland Provincial League Championship with the winner to play in Division 2C for 2025–26.

=== All-Ireland Provincial League Championship ===
The All-Ireland Provincial League Championship was contested by the winners of the four provincial qualifying leagues in Connacht, Leinster, Munster and Ulster. They were drawn to play in two semi-finals at neutral venues with the winners meeting in the final, also at a neutral venue with the winner playing in Division 2C of the A.I.L. for 2025–26.

The runner-up played away against the 9th place team in Division 2C and the winner of this play-off would also play in Division 2C of the A.I.L. for 2025–26, with the loser returning to their relevant provincial league.

== Team changes ==
The following promotions and relegations occurred at the end of the 2023–24 season:

	Promoted	Relegated
Division 1A	—	Dublin University, Shannon*
Division 1B	St Mary's College, Garryowen*	Buccaneers
Division 2A	Nenagh Ormond	Malone, UL Bohemians*
Division 2B	Instonians, Galway Corinthians*	Belfast Harlequins, Dolphin*
Division 2C	Clogher Valley, Galwegians*	Ballina, Bangor*
A-I PLC	Ballyclare, Monkstown*	—

* via play-offs

== Division 1A ==
Cork Constitution started their 33rd consecutive season in the top division of the All-Ireland League (the only club to be ever present in the top division of the league since its inception in 1990) as defending champions, but by the mid-season break were in mid-table outside the play-off places. Garryowen made a quick return to Division 1A after being relegated in 2022–23, but with just one win in nine games were bottom at Christmas in danger of returning to 1B. Their relegation to 1B was confirmed after Round 17 despite victory against Clontarf. St Mary's College returned to the top flight as Division 1B champions after a six-year absence and took over top spot by the mid-season interval from Ballynahinch who dropped to fourth after back-to-back defeats in December. Clontarf and Terenure completed the top four at Christmas. With one round remaining the semi-finalists were decided as Terenure, with 3 defeats in-a-row in March dropped out of the top four as Lansdowne's 3 victories in March ensured them a place in the play-offs alongside Clontarf, St. Mary's and Cork Con.

Location of teams in the 2024-25 All-Ireland League Division 1A
Location of Dublin teams in the 2024-25 All-Ireland League Division 1A

=== Teams ===
Team	Location	Stadium	Capacity
Ballynahinch	Ballynahinch	Ballymacarn Park	1,000
City of Armagh	Armagh	Palace Grounds	1,000
Clontarf	Dublin (Clontarf)	Castle Avenue	3,200
Cork Constitution	Cork (Ballintemple)	Temple Hill	1,000
Garryowen	Limerick (Dooradoyle)	Dooradoyle	1,500
Lansdowne	Dublin (Ballsbridge)	Aviva Stadium (Back Pitch)	1,000
St Mary's College	Dublin (Templeogue)	Templeville Road	4,000
Terenure College	Dublin (Terenure)	Lakelands Park	3,000
UCD	Dublin (Belfield)	UCD Bowl	3,000
Young Munster	Limerick (Rosbrien)	Tom Clifford Park	2,000

=== Final Table ===
Pos	Team	Pld	W	D	L	PF	PA	PD	TF	TA	TB	LB	Pts	Qualification
1	Clontarf (C)	18	14	0	4	494	357	+137	64	45	9	1	66	Play-off semi-finals
2	St Mary's College	18	11	1	6	549	450	+99	68	63	13	4	63	Play-off semi-finals
3	Cork Constitution (L)	18	12	1	5	489	392	+97	68	54	10	2	62	Play-off semi-finals
4	Lansdowne	18	12	0	6	476	339	+137	65	46	8	5	61	Play-off semi-finals
5	Ballynahinch	18	10	1	7	372	430	−58	60	65	8	1	51	
6	Terenure College	18	9	1	8	464	411	+53	60	55	7	5	50	
7	Young Munster	18	7	0	11	387	445	−58	55	59	7	6	41	
8	UCD	18	5	0	13	357	436	−79	49	68	6	4	30	
9	City of Armagh (R)	18	5	0	13	343	464	−121	45	62	4	5	29	Division 1B Play-offs
10	Garryowen	18	3	0	15	307	514	−207	38	51	2	5	19	Relegation to Division 1B

Updated to match(es) played on 5 April 2025. Source: 2024–25 AIL Tables
Rules for classification: Tiebreakers for teams tied on points: 1) Difference between points for and against; 2) Number of matches won; 3) Number of matches drawn; 4) Most tries scored; 5) Most league points in matches involving tied teams.
(C) Champions; (L) Losing finalist; (R) Relegated

=== Results ===
Home \ Away	BNH	ARM	CTF	CON	GAR	LAN	STM	TER	UCD	YMS
Ballynahinch	—	7–0	12–32	5–28	33–7	21–24	36–33	24–24	24–19	28–15
City of Armagh	22–29	—	7–41	26–28	17–26	15–19	22–32	31–29	22–25	16–15
Clontarf	45–16	35–25	—	15–13	29–21	49–46	47–19	10–28	18–5	26–20
Cork Constitution	51–21	31–19	16–20	—	43–10	12–28	27–27	47–45	38–33	25–5
Garryowen	12–17	6–13	19–18	17–19	—	29–27	22–64	9–35	19–29	10–26
Lansdowne	25–27	22–14	26–17	27–10	26–13	—	26–32	32–0	25–10	29–14
St Mary's College	34–21	40–12	27–31	29–30	25–22	5–26	—	32–22	36–14	26–24
Terenure College	24–3	26–30	15–17	25–15	42–26	28–22	27–24	—	25–11	12–20
UCD	10–22	29–21	15–30	17–26	26–15	7–25	21–29	24–27	—	22–24
Young Munster	25–26	24–31	27–14	23–30	25–24	36–21	20–35	34–30	10–40	—

Updated to match(es) played on 5 April 2025. Source: 2024–25 AIL fixtures & results
Legend: Blue = home team win; Yellow = draw; Red = away team win.

== Division 1B ==
After two seasons in Division 1A Shannon returned to Division 1B along with Dublin University who were automatically relegated and both sides found themselves in the bottom half of the table by Christmas with Shannon just 2 points ahead of bottom side Highfield. At the other end of the table Old Belvedere (1st) and Nenagh Ormond (2nd), playing at this level for the first time in their history, having come up from Division 2A as champions, were well clear of the chasing pack at the mid-season break, and Belvo's bonus point victory over Ormond in Round 15 secured the division title and promotion to the top flight. Despite a bonus point victory on the last day of the season, Shannon found themselves being relegated for the second season in-a-row.

Location of teams in the 2024-25 All-Ireland League Division 1B
Location of Dublin teams in the 2024-25 All-Ireland League Division 1B

=== Teams ===
Team	Location	Stadium	Capacity
Blackrock College	Dublin (Blackrock)	Stradbrook Road	4,000
Dublin University	Dublin	College Park	200
Highfield	Cork (Bishopstown)	Woodleigh Park	4,000
Naas	Naas	Forenaughts	3,000
Nenagh Ormond	Nenagh	New Ormond Park	1,000
Old Belvedere	Dublin (Ballsbridge)	Anglesea Road	1,000
Old Wesley	Dublin (Donnybrook)	Donnybrook Stadium	7,000
Queen's University	Belfast	Dub Lane	1,000
Shannon	Limerick	Thomond Park	25,600
UCC	Cork (Mardyke)	Mardyke Arena	5,000

=== Final Table ===
Pos	Team	Pld	W	D	L	PF	PA	PD	TF	TA	TB	LB	Pts	Qualification
1	Old Belvedere	18	15	0	3	619	367	+252	90	48	12	2	74	Promotion to Division 1A
2	Nenagh Ormond (W, P)	18	12	1	5	485	412	+73	58	52	9	2	61	Division 1B Play-offs
3	Blackrock College	18	11	0	7	463	400	+63	63	51	9	3	56	Division 1B Play-offs
4	UCC	18	9	0	9	533	429	+104	76	59	12	5	53	Division 1B Play-offs
5	Old Wesley	18	9	1	8	486	419	+67	64	59	9	4	51	
6	Queen's University	18	8	0	10	439	580	−141	65	81	8	2	42	
7	Naas	18	6	0	12	452	467	−15	60	66	8	7	39	
8	Highfield	18	7	0	11	390	573	−183	51	77	4	2	34	
9	Dublin University (W)	18	7	0	11	326	457	−131	41	63	1	4	33	Division 2A Play-offs
10	Shannon	18	5	0	13	339	428	−89	43	57	2	7	29	Relegation to Division 2A

Updated to match(es) played on 5 April 2025. Source: 2024–25 AIL Tables
Rules for classification: Tiebreakers for teams tied on points: 1) Difference between points for and against; 2) Number of matches won; 3) Number of matches drawn; 4) Most tries scored; 5) Most league points in matches involving tied teams.
(P) Promoted; (W) Play-off winner

=== Results ===
Home \ Away	BLK	DBU	HIF	NAS	NOR	OBV	OWS	QUB	SHN	UCC
Blackrock College	—	27–22	28–24	36–29	36–38	26–20	40–28	28–7	24–10	25–5
Dublin University	13–10	—	23–28	24–22	20–7	19–43	12–27	24–21	20–19	24–21
Highfield	30–21	20–26	—	19–17	22–31	10–30	13–6	17–35	36–10	7–45
Naas	10–38	33–12	42–43	—	27–21	10–51	10–22	61–21	10–15	34–30
Nenagh Ormond	21–17	27–3	38–25	19–18	—	31–32	34–26	22–14	24–18	38–34
Old Belvedere	34–35	36–18	57–21	23–10	34–22	—	13–10	71–14	39–24	43–17
Old Wesley	29–13	38–17	55–14	20–57	22–22	16–21	—	51–38	34–5	44–41
Queen's University	38–22	33–14	52–26	26–15	24–14	24–43	19–14	—	19–13	14–50
Shannon	16–20	20–15	18–21	18–23	15–42	22–24	23–13	66–12	—	20–10
UCC	26–17	25–20	39–14	29–24	25–34	38–5	27–31	29–28	42–7	—

Updated to match(es) played on 5 April 2025. Source: 2024–25 AIL fixtures & results
Legend: Blue = home team win; Yellow = draw; Red = away team win.

== Division 2A ==
Buccaneers returned to Division 2A after two seasons in 1B. By the mid-season break they looked set to be relegated again having lost all 9 of their matches and a home defeat to Greystones in a rescheduled Round 12 fixture on 22 February confirmed their drop to 2B for 2025–26. Instonians play in Division 2A following two successive promotions as champions after their return to the A.I.L. in 2022 and at the halfway point in the season were on course for another repeat as they were clear leaders at the top from second placed Galway Corinthians who, at the third attempt gained promotion to Division 2A via the play-offs. Instonians subsequently gained promotion after Round 16 with victory over Greystones.

Location of teams in the 2024-25 All-Ireland League Division 2A

=== Teams ===
Team	Location	Stadium	Capacity
Ballymena	Antrim	Eaton Park	1,000
Banbridge	Banbridge	Rifle Park	1,000
Buccaneers	Athlone	Dubarry Park	10,000
Cashel	Cashel	Spafield	2,500
Galway Corinthians	Galway (Castlegar)	Corinthian Park	1,000
Greystones	Greystones	Dr Hickey Park	1,000
Instonians	Belfast	Shawsbridge Sports Complex	1,000
MU Barnhall	Leixlip	Parsonstown	1,000
Navan	Navan	Balreask Old	4,000
Old Crescent	Limerick (Rosbrien)	Rosbrien	4,000

=== Final Table ===
Pos	Team	Pld	W	D	L	PF	PA	PD	TF	TA	TB	LB	Pts	Qualification
1	Instonians	18	15	0	3	676	410	+266	102	58	14	2	76	Promotion to Division 1B
2	Cashel	18	14	0	4	576	383	+193	81	53	12	2	70	Division 2A Play-offs
3	MU Barnhall	18	13	0	5	623	451	+172	89	64	14	3	69	Division 2A Play-offs
4	Greystones	18	12	0	6	517	348	+169	74	43	9	4	61	Division 2A Play-offs
5	Galway Corinthians	18	13	0	5	495	336	+159	74	45	8	1	61	
6	Banbridge	18	8	0	10	403	418	−15	56	65	9	4	45	
7	Old Crescent	18	6	1	11	403	477	−74	47	0	5	4	35	
8	Ballymena	18	4	0	14	358	475	−117	51	69	6	8	30	
9	Navan (R)	18	4	1	13	348	444	−96	48	60	3	6	27	Division 2B Play-offs
10	Buccaneers	18	0	0	18	247	904	−657	31	130	2	0	2	Relegation to Division 2B

Updated to match(es) played on 5 April 2025. Source: 2024–25 AIL Tables
Rules for classification: Tiebreakers for teams tied on points: 1) Difference between points for and against; 2) Number of matches won; 3) Number of matches drawn; 4) Most tries scored; 5) Most league points in matches involving tied teams.
(R) Relegated

=== Results ===
Home \ Away	BMA	BAN	BUC	CAS	GYC	GRE	INS	MUB	NAV	OCR
Ballymena	—	6–11	22–12	13–31	10–27	12–28	38–21	17–24	29–21	22–27
Banbridge	30–25	—	62–26	8–38	27–0	22–25	6–22	26–31	29–21	9–6
Buccaneers	19–27	19–35	—	0–43	19–42	10–48	24–52	26–69	7–41	10–42
Cashel	29–24	38–24	36–8	—	13–5	20–15	25–40	39–33	14–17	69–21
Galway Corinthians	19–12	19–16	64–0	39–41	—	40–10	21–15	19–15	14–7	43–21
Greystones	46–12	25–12	71–8	22–25	45–15	—	28–29	33–34	16–13	29–22
Instonians	48–24	33–21	92–21	36–34	31–12	38–22	—	61–29	33–12	35–17
MU Barnhall	31–10	57–22	76–21	30–17	14–31	10–14	35–31	—	34–29	22–10
Navan	22–21	14–31	29–5	14–26	23–63	13–15	12–19	24–50	—	22–22
Old Crescent	29–24	13–12	43–12	34–38	17–22	13–25	29–40	21–29	16–14	—

Updated to match(es) played on 5 April 2025. Source: 2024–25 AIL fixtures & results
Legend: Blue = home team win; Yellow = draw; Red = away team win.

== Division 2B ==
Malone find themselves in Division 2B following two successive relegations, while having survived a relegation play-off the previous season UL Bohemians failed to do so last season and also made the drop from Division 2A. A.I.L. debutants Clogher Valley won Division 2C gaining promotion to 2B and by the halfway point in the season were in the promotion play-off places. Promotion play-off winners Galwegians bounced straight back up after being relegated in 2022–23. Wanderers led the table at the Christmas break from Dungannon while at the other end, just a point separated bottom sides Sligo and Malahide and Sligo's victory over Malahide in Round 16 relegated the Lions. In Round 17 Wanderers' victory over Clogher Valley secured the title and promotion.

Location of teams in the 2024-25 All-Ireland League Division 2B

=== Teams ===
Team	Location	Stadium	Capacity
Clogher Valley	Fivemiletown	The Cran	1,000
Dungannon	Dungannon	Stevenson Park	1,000
Galwegians	Galway (Renmore)	Crowley Park	2,000
Malahide	Malahide	Estuary Road	1,000
Malone	Belfast	Gibson Park	1,000
Skerries	Skerries	Holmpatrick	1,000
Sligo	Strandhill	Hamilton Park	1,000
Rainey	Magherafelt	Hatrick Park	1,000
UL Bohemians	Limerick (UL)	UL4G	1,000
Wanderers	Dublin (Ballsbridge)	Merrion Road	1,000

=== Final Table ===
Pos	Team	Pld	W	D	L	PF	PA	PD	TF	TA	TB	LB	Pts	Qualification
1	Wanderers	18	14	0	4	586	302	+284	83	40	15	3	74	Promotion to Division 2A
2	Dungannon (W, P)	18	14	1	3	465	340	+125	61	46	7	3	68	Division 2B Play-offs
3	Clogher Valley	18	11	0	7	433	371	+62	59	52	5	3	52	Division 2B Play-offs
4	Galwegians	18	8	0	10	395	337	+58	57	43	8	9	49	Division 2B Play-offs
5	Rainey	18	9	0	9	396	356	+40	57	45	6	6	48	
6	UL Bohemians	18	9	0	9	420	425	−5	57	61	7	5	48	
7	Malone*	18	9	0	9	425	423	+2	54	60	4	4	43	
8	Sligo	18	6	1	11	323	396	−73	46	52	4	5	35	
9	Skerries (W)	18	7	0	11	368	527	−159	45	78	3	4	35	Division 2C Play-offs
10	Malahide	18	2	0	16	345	679	−334	48	97	4	4	16	Relegation to Division 2C

Updated to match(es) played on 5 April 2025. Source: 2024–25 AIL Tables
Rules for classification: Tiebreakers for teams tied on points: 1) Difference between points for and against; 2) Number of matches won; 3) Number of matches drawn; 4) Most tries scored; 5) Most league points in matches involving tied teams.
(P) Promoted; (W) Play-off winner

* Malone deducted 1 point for a breach of the international player clearance process.

=== Results ===
Home \ Away	CLV	DUN	GLW	MLD	MLN	SKR	SLG	RAI	ULB	WAN
Clogher Valley	—	18–21	21–10	65–26	10–17	39–24	11–6	17–15	44–12	15–38
Dungannon	33–21	—	28–27	45–14	31–14	21–22	22–22	28–21	23–13	31–28
Galwegians	21–22	8–10	—	29–22	17–14	35–36	24–7	23–17	22–27	8–13
Malahide	15–26	15–45	18–24	—	19–48	35–36	39–35	21–36	22–17	0–54
Malone	20–24	15–17	26–24	47–19	—	42–15	36–37	20–13	30–21	14–35
Skerries	15–40	23–24	7–39	27–21	22–24	—	7–12	24–22	32–26	26–24
Sligo	7–12	7–19	7–24	39–11	21–12	23–17	—	19–22	12–8	12–31
Rainey	32–20	15–22	17–15	21–10	50–13	34–5	24–20	—	0–15	42–29
UL Bohemians	27–21	33–26	24–25	47–33	19–20	32–10	34–25	17–15	—	26–24
Wanderers	42–7	24–19	21–20	38–5	29–13	34–20	43–12	38–10	41–22	—

Updated to match(es) played on 5 April 2025. Source: 2024–25 AIL fixtures & results
Legend: Blue = home team win; Yellow = draw; Red = away team win.

== Division 2C ==
After two successive relegations Dolphin find themselves in Division 2C along with Belfast Harlequins who also make the drop from 2B. However at the halfway stage of the season both were in joint 2nd place behind clear leaders Midleton. Joining the division from the junior ranks are Ballyclare, who are making their debut season in the A.I.L., and Monkstown, returning after a 21-year absence and both were in mid-table at the Christmas break. With just 1 win each both Omagh Academicals and Tullamore were propping up the table at the mid-season break. A bonus point win away to Belfast Harlequins on the last day of the season saw Enniscorthy pip long time leaders Midleton for the title and automatic promotion to 2B, while a final day defeat for season strugglers Tullamore saw them relegated from the league.

Location of teams in the 2024-25 All-Ireland League Division 2C

=== Teams ===
Team	Location	Stadium	Capacity
Ballyclare	Ballyclare	The Cloughan	1,000
Belfast Harlequins	Belfast	Deramore Park	1,000
Bruff	Bruff	Kilballyowen Park	2,000
Clonmel	Clonmel	Ard Gaoithe	4,000
Dolphin	Cork (Ballyphehane)	Musgrave Park	8,008
Enniscorthy	Wexford	Ross Road	1,000
Midleton	Midleton	Towns Park	400
Monkstown	Sandymount	Sydney Parade	1,000
Omagh Academicals	Omagh	Thomas Mellon Playing Fields	1,000
Tullamore	Tullamore	Spollanstown	1,000

=== Final Table ===
Pos	Team	Pld	W	D	L	PF	PA	PD	TF	TA	TB	LB	Pts	Qualification
1	Enniscorthy	18	12	1	5	482	433	+49	70	55	12	2	64	Promotion to Division 2B
2	Midleton	18	12	3	3	402	316	+86	58	35	8	1	63	Division 2C Play-offs
3	Dolphin	18	11	2	5	474	356	+118	66	50	9	3	60	Division 2C Play-offs
4	Ballyclare	18	10	2	6	567	404	+163	79	56	12	3	59	Division 2C Play-offs
5	Monkstown	18	11	0	7	481	459	+22	58	0	8	5	57	
6	Clonmel	18	10	1	7	447	394	+53	52	51	5	7	54	
7	Belfast Harlequins	18	8	2	8	417	454	−37	61	63	8	4	48	
8	Bruff	18	5	0	13	287	433	−146	34	59	2	7	29	
9	Omagh Academicals (R)	18	2	2	14	367	532	−165	51	71	5	7	24	Provincial League Play-off
10	Tullamore	18	2	1	15	292	435	−143	28	56	0	8	18	Relegation to Provincial League

Updated to match(es) played on 5 April 2025. Source: 2024–25 AIL Tables
Rules for classification: Tiebreakers for teams tied on points: 1) Difference between points for and against; 2) Number of matches won; 3) Number of matches drawn; 4) Most tries scored; 5) Most league points in matches involving tied teams.
(R) Relegated

=== Results ===
Home \ Away	BCL	BHQ	BRF	CML	DOL	ENS	MID	MNK	OMA	TUL
Ballyclare	—	37–15	66–0	44–38	25–22	41–10	24–12	31–39	31–12	51–27
Belfast Harlequins	21–21	—	15–17	22–25	32–21	26–29	22–22	22–17	31–26	28–21
Bruff	32–34	5–7	—	7–28	15–20	19–35	11–15	17–20	27–19	20–15
Clonmel	19–17	29–21	28–22	—	10–10	19–26	29–11	21–24	28–26	35–11
Dolphin	28–27	46–33	24–15	20–15	—	54–28	15–15	43–14	53–15	40–19
Enniscorthy	30–29	20–29	34–8	31–25	12–5	—	24–27	16–10	48–27	15–10
Midleton	20–10	39–17	21–6	24–20	18–13	29–26	—	34–28	15–15	17–12
Monkstown	46–33	36–38	24–21	27–29	20–7	29–40	26–24	—	43–38	26–13
Omagh Academicals	19–19	27–21	20–23	31–28	26–29	21–33	7–41	15–26	—	10–17
Tullamore	14–27	16–17	8–22	20–21	17–24	25–25	11–18	17–26	19–13	—

Updated to match(es) played on 5 April 2025. Source: 2024–25 AIL fixtures & results
Legend: Blue = home team win; Yellow = draw; Red = away team win.

== Play-offs ==
=== Division 1A Play-offs ===
Semi-finals

19 April 2025
16:00 IST (UTC+1)
Semi-final 1

Clontarf	17 - 15	Lansdowne
Try: S Owens 21'c B Griffin 40+5'c Con: C Kelly (2/2) 21', 40+5'; Pen: C Kelly (1/1) 38'	Report	Try: R Clarke 4'; C Tector 34'c Con: C Tector (1/2) 34'; Pen: C Tector (1/1) 40'

Castle Avenue
Referee: Robbie Jenkinson (IRFU)

19 April 2025
14:30 IST (UTC+1)
Semi-final 2

St Mary's College	8 - 16	Cork Constitution
Try: E Baxter 9'; Pen: C Hayes (1/2) 68'	Report	Try: D Hyland 54'c Con: J Taylor (1/1) 54'; Pen: J Taylor (3/4) 36', 64', 78'

Templeville Road
Referee: Daniel Carson (IRFU)

All-Ireland League Final
See below.

=== Division 1B Play-offs ===
Semi-finals

19 April 2025
14:30 IST (UTC+1)
Semi-final 1

City of Armagh	10 - 17	UCC
Try: J McCormick 15'c Con: R Olsen (1/1) 16'; Pen: R Olsen 49'	Report	Try: D Squires 8'c G O'Leary Kareem 30'c Con: D Squires (2/2) 9', 31'; Pen: D Squires 74'

Palace Grounds
Referee: Pádraic Reidy (IRFU)

- City of Armagh relegated from Division 1A

19 April 2025
14:30 IST (UTC+1)
Semi-final 2

Nenagh Ormond	25 - 17	Blackrock College
Try: C McMahon 26'; M Doran 40'c W Coffey 49'c Con: C McMahon (2/3) 40+1', 50'; Pen: C McMahon 5', 70'	Report	Try: D McCarthy 11'c M Dwan 39'c Con: C O'Shaughnessy (2/2) 12', 40'; Pen: C O'Shaughnessy 32'

New Ormond Park
Referee: Keane Davison (IRFU)

Play-off Final

26 April 2025
14:30 IST (UTC+1)
Final

Nenagh Ormond	36 - 33	UCC
Try: J Healy 26'c J Rowland 58'c, 80+4'c J O'Flaherty 70'; Penalty try 80'c Con: C McMahon (1/1) 27'; C O'Doherty (2/3) 59', 80+5'; Pen: C McMahon 35'	Report	Try: Penalty try 8'c S Edogbo 40'c S Condon 78'c Con: D Squires (2/2) 40+1', 79'; Pen: D Squires 30', 44', 48', 64'

New Ormond Park
Referee: Andrew Cole (IRFU)

- Nenagh Ormond promoted to Division 1A

=== Division 2A Play-offs ===
Semi-finals

19 April 2025
14:30 IST (UTC+1)
Semi-final 1

Dublin University	20 - 18	Greystones
Try: C O'Reilly 36'c S Woods 75'c Con: M Lynch (2/2) 37', 76'; Pen: M Lynch 32', 43'	Report	Try: R Satherly 53'; F Kenny 64', 67'; Pen: D Baker 40+2'

College Park
Referee: Stuart Gaffikin (IRFU)

19 April 2025
14:30 IST (UTC+1)
Semi-final 2

Cashel	26 - 14	MU Barnhall
Try: A Flannery 11'c J Callery 59'c Con: B Twomey (2/2) 12', 60'; Pen: B Twomey 2', 5', 27', 30'	Report	Try: C Duggan 55'c A Olaosebikan 80'c Con: A Chester (2/2) 56', 80+1'

Spafield
Referee: Stuart Douglas (IRFU)

Play-off Final

26 April 2025
14:30 IST (UTC+1)
Final

Dublin University	18 - 16	Cashel
Try: Z Baird 70'; M Lynch 77'c Con: M Lynch (1/2) 78'; Pen: M Lynch 14', 80+3'	Report	Try: J Pickering 45'c Con: B Twomey (1/1) 46'; Pen: B Twomey 31', 59', 74'

College Park
Referee: Peter Martin (IRFU)

- Dublin University retain Division 1B status

=== Division 2B Play-offs ===
Semi-finals

19 April 2025
14:30 IST (UTC+1)
Semi-final 1

Navan	29 - 19	Galwegians
Try: J Finney 5'c H Watters 40'c, 75'; S Walshe 71'c Con: H Watters (1/1) 6'; M Farrell (2/3) 40+1', 72'; Pen: M Farrell 30'	Report	Try: D Kennedy 9'; J Winters 18'c, 54'c Con: R Roche (2/3) 19', 55'

Balreask Old
Referee: Henry Richmond (IRFU)

19 April 2025
14:30 IST (UTC+1)
Semi-final 2

Dungannon	23 - 22	Clogher Valley
Try: A Milligan 61'c T Gribben 71'c Con: B McCaughey (2/2) 62', 72'; Pen: B McCaughey 25', 40', 80'	Report	Try: T Haire 3'; E Haire 45'c M Bothwell 50'c Con: D Maxwell (2/3) 46', 51'; Pen: D Maxwell 29'

Stevenson Park
Referee: Christopher Lough (IRFU)

Play-off Final

26 April 2025
14:30 IST (UTC+1)
Final

Navan	23 - 28	Dungannon
Try: A Martinez 29'; S Walshe 38', 46'c Con: T Gavigan (1/3) 47'; Pen: T Gavigan 34', 77'	Report	Try: R Abernethy 13'c B McCaughey 52'c C Conroy 68'; Con: B McCaughey (2/3) 14', 53'; Pen: B McCaughey 2', 40+7', 60'

Balreask Old
Referee: Tomás O'Sullivan (IRFU)

- Dungannon promoted to Division 2A, Navan relegated to Division 2B

=== Division 2C Play-offs ===
Semi-finals

19 April 2025
14:30 IST (UTC+1)
Semi-final 1

Skerries	27 - 10	Ballyclare
Try: T Deering 3', 65'; D McEneaney 34'c P O'Neill 77'c Con: R Mulcahy (2/4), 35', 78'; Pen: R Mulcahy 28'	Report	Try: P Gillespie 37'c Con: M McDowell (1/1) 28'; Pen: M McDowell 7'

Holmpatrick
Referee: Shane Gaughan (IRFU)

19 April 2025
14:30 IST (UTC+1)
Semi-final 2

Midleton	18 - 17	Dolphin
Try: K Reid 5'c JB du Toit 14'; Con: C Doyle (1/2) 6'; Pen: C Doyle 49', 80+6'	Report	Try: B O'Mahony 37'; D O'Shaughnessy 46'; J Fitzgerald 68'c Con: J Soli (1/3) 69'

Towns Park
Referee: Paul O'Connor (IRFU)

Play-off Final

26 April 2025
14:30 IST (UTC+1)
Final

Skerries	32 - 26	Midleton
Try: B Walsh 11', 42'; M Sherlock 21'c, 69'; B McKiernan 55'c Con: R Mulcahy (2/5) 22', 56'; Pen: R Mulcahy 38'	Report	Try: JB du Toit 7', 59'c I Rqibi 72'; S Monaghan 78'c Con: C Doyle (3/4) 8', 60', 79'

Holmpatrick
Referee: Daniel Carson (IRFU)

- Skerries retain Division 2B status

=== Provincial League Championship ===
Semi-finals

5 April 2025
13:00 IST (UTC+1)
Semi-final 1

Creggs (Connacht)	20 - 40	Bective Rangers ( Leinster)
Try: M Purcell, X Woodhouse; Con: S Purcell (2); Pen: S Purcell (2)	Report	Try: J Gallagher (2), O Foote, L Mion, G Kelly, Penalty try Con: M O'Hare (4)

Beech Park, Kildare
Referee: Brían Bennett (IRFU)

5 April 2025
15:00 IST (UTC+1)
Semi-final 2

Thomond (Munster)	17 - 10	Dromore ( Ulster)
Try: J McGarry, J Kiely, E Sherlock; Con: J Kiely (1)	Report	Try: A McDonald, G Dillon

Beech Park, Kildare
Referee: Cathal Roddy (IRFU)

Final

12 April 2025
14:30 IST (UTC+1)
Final

Bective Rangers ( Leinster)	39 - 34	Thomond ( Munster)
Try: C Halpenny, M Keane, M Gilsenan, T McCloskey, S O'Meara; Con: M Gilsenan (4); Pen: M Gilsenan (2)	Report	Try: J McGarry, E Sherlock, J Kiely, J Connolly; Con: J Kiely (4); Pen: J Kiely (2)

Beech Park, Kildare
Referee: Shane Gaughan (IRFU)

- Bective Rangers promoted to A.I.L.

Play-off

26 April 2025
14:30 IST (UTC+1)
Play-off

Omagh Academicals	15 - 23	Thomond ( Munster)
Try: C Watherston-Spencer 41'; S Barr 52'c Con: S Elliot (1/2) 53'; Pen: S Elliot 36'	Report	Try: J McGarry 33'; K McGrath 40+1'; J Connolly 62'c Con: J Kiely (1/3) 63'; Pen: J Kiely 26', 52'

Thomas Mellon Playing Fields
Referee: Dermot Blake (IRFU)

- Thomond promoted to A.I.L., Omagh Academicals relegated from A.I.L.

== Final ==
The All-Ireland League final took place on Sunday, 27 April 2025, at the Aviva Stadium, Dublin. The match was broadcast live on TG4 television. Defending champions Cork Constitution played Clontarf, the 4th time the sides met in the Final, with Con having two victories to 'Tarf's one. Clontarf were victorious winning by a single point to claim their fourth League title.

=== All-Ireland League Final ===
27 April 2025
16:00 IST (UTC+1)

Clontarf	22 - 21	Cork Constitution
Try: H Cooney 22'; D Donnellan 33'c C Fahy 74'c Con: C Kellly (2/3) 34', 75'; Pen: C Kelly (1/4) 46'	Report	Try: S French 28'c A Maher 38'c J Sheahan 78'c Con: J Taylor (3/3) 29', 39', 79'

Aviva Stadium
Referee: Keane Davison (IRFU)

Clontarf	Cork Constitution

FB	15	Tadhg Bird
RW	14	Andrew Smith
OC	13	Hugh Cooney
IC	12	Connor Fahy
LW	11	Peter Maher
FH	10	Conor Kelly
SH	9	Sam Owens
LP	1	Charlie Ward		(substituted off) 70'
HK	2	Dylan Donnellan	(c)
TP	3	Ben Griffin
RL	4	Fionn Gilbert
LL	5	Jim Peters		(substituted off) 66'
BF	6	Callum Smith
OF	7	Aaron Coleman
N8	8	John Vinson		(substituted off) 40'
Substitutes:
HK	16	Declan Adamson
PR	17	Conor Bateman		(substituted on) 70'
FL	18	Luke Brady		(substituted on) 66'
SH	19	Will Reilly
WR	20	Stephen Ryan
CE	21	James Conroy
FL	22	Oran Walsh		(substituted on) 40'
PR	23	Alvin Amaniampong
Coach:
(Ireland) Andy Wood

FB	15	George Coomber			(substituted off) 73'
RW	14	Daniel Hurley		(substituted off) 57'
OC	13	Seán French
IC	12	Niall Kenneally
LW	11	Matthew Bowen
FH	10	James Taylor		(substituted off) 66'	(substituted on) 73'
SH	9	Adam Maher		(substituted off) 72'
LP	1	Mark Donnelly
HK	2	Billy Scannell		(substituted off) 58'
TP	3	Luke Masters		(substituted off) 40'
RL	4	Seán Duffy		(substituted off) 73'
LL	5	John Forde
BF	6	Jack Kelleher
OF	7	Ronán O'Sullivan	(yellow card) 40+2'	(substituted off) 66'
N8	8	David Hyland	(c)
Substitutes:
HK	16	Danny Sheahan		(substituted on) 58'
PR	17	David Good			(substituted on) 73'
PR	18	Charlie Connolly		(substituted on) 40'	(substituted off) 73'
LK	19	Eoin Quilter		(substituted on) 66'
FL	20	Jacob Sheahan		(substituted on) 73'
SH	21	Louis Kahn		(substituted on) 72'
CE	22	Eoghan Smith		(substituted on) 66'
WR	23	Rob Jermyn		(substituted on) 57'
Coach:
(Ireland) Jonny Holland

Player of the match:
Hugh Cooney (Clontarf)

Assistant Referees:
Stuart Gaffikin (IRFU)
Christopher Lough (IRFU)
Television match official:
Colin Stanley (IRFU)

== See also ==
- Bateman Cup
- Connacht Senior Cup
- Leinster Senior Cup
- Munster Senior Cup
- Ulster Senior Cup
