= Kanturk RFC =

Irish rugby union club in County Cork, Ireland

(Ireland) Kanturk RFC
- Full name: Kanturk Rugby Football Club
- Union: IRFU; Munster
- Founded: 1927; 99 years ago
- Ground(s): Knocknacolan, Kanturk
- Director of Rugby: Tony Daly
Team kit

Kanturk Rugby Football Club is a rugby union club based in Kanturk, County Cork, Ireland, playing in Division 1 of the Munster Junior League. Founded in 1927, the club reached the All-Ireland League for the first time in 2014.
