= Clanwilliam F.C. =

Irish rugby union club, based in Tipperary, Co. Tipperary

Clanwilliam Football Club is the sixth oldest rugby union club in Ireland. The club is based in Tipperary Town, County Tipperary.

Clanwilliam FC currently caters for all age groups including Mini’s Rugby (U7s to U12s for boys and girls), Youths Rugby (U13s, U14s, U16s & U18s) and the club has two adult teams (1st XV & 2nd XV). The 1st XV currently compete in the First Division of the Munster Junior League.

== History ==
Clanwilliam Football Club were founded in 1879, making them the sixth oldest rugby club in Ireland. The club was formed to capitalise on the popularity of rugby at The Abbey School, and it is speculated that the growth of rugby in the area led to a resurgence in gaelic football, leading to the eventual foundation of the Gaelic Athletic Association in nearby Thurles. The club lived a nomadic existence until 1956 when they moved to Clanwilliam Park and later opened a second team pitch at Collegelands, Tipperary. Clanwilliam Park has been used as the venue for the Munster Schools Junior Cup. In 1947, the club won the Munster Junior Cup. They also won the Munster Challenge Cup in 1996.

In 2018, when the Irish Wheelchair Association in County Tipperary required additional funding, Clanwilliam took it upon themselves to raise €112,000 for the charity.

== Notable Players ==
Clanwilliam FC has a tradition of developing young players, a number of whom have represented Munster Rugby and Ireland national rugby union team at Youth, Junior and Senior levels, including players such as John Lacey, Tommy O'Donnell and Amee-Leigh Costigan.

Former Munster Rugby and Ireland national rugby union team player Alan Quinlan started his career at Clanwilliam prior to rugby union permitting professionalism.
