= Midleton RFC =

Irish rugby union club, based in County Cork

Midleton
- Full name: Midleton Rugby Football Club
- Union: (Ireland) IRFU
- Branch: Munster
- Founded: 1967; 59 years ago
- Ground(s): Towns Park, Midleton (Capacity: ~400)
- President: CJ O'Neill
- Coach: David Lee
- League: A.I.L Div. 2C
- 2025-26: 7th
Team kit

Official website
- midletonrugby.com

Midleton RFC is an Irish rugby union club that plays in Division 2C of the All-Ireland League.

== History ==
The club was founded in the 1927/28 season, but disbanded in 1934. Midleton RFC was reformed on 4 March 1967.

After a number of decades in the junior leagues, Midleton attained senior status after the 1997/1998 campaign with a 30-7 playoff victory over Sligo RFC. Midleton were beaten finalists in the Munster Senior Cup in 2003. As of 2010, the club was playing in Division Three. By 2020, the club was playing in Division 2C of the All-Ireland League.

There was a revamp of club facilities in the mid-2000s.

== Club honours ==
- Munster Junior Cup (2): 1997, 1998
- Cork Charity Cup (3): 1999, 2003, 2006
- Cork Charity Shield (4): 2018, 2019, 2020, 2022
- Munster Junior Clubs' Challenge Cup (1): 1997
- Munster Junior League Division 1 (2): 1996-97, 1997-98
- Munster Junior League Division 2 (1): 1994

== Notable players ==
Former All Black fullback Christian Cullen made a 20 minute appearance for Midleton in a friendly match against Cork Constitution in March 2006. Other former players have included:

- (New Zealand) Jason Holland
- (United States) Junior Sifa
- (Ireland) Christy Condon
- (Ireland) John O'Neill
- (Ireland) Diarmuid O'Sullivan
- (Ireland) Mark Donnelly
