= Munster Senior Cup (rugby union) =

Rugby competition

The Munster Senior Cup is a rugby union competition for the senior clubs affiliated to the Munster branch of the Irish Rugby Football Union.

The competition was founded in 1886 by John Maguire of Cork FC and W.L. Stokes of Garryowen FC.

The winners compete with the other three provincial cup winners for the All-Ireland Cup.

== Roll of honour ==
	Team	Winner	Winning Years
1	Garryowen	40	1889, 1890, 1891, 1892, 1893, 1894, 1895, 1896, 1898, 1899, 1902, 1903, 1904, 1908, 1909, 1911, 1914, 1920, 1924, 1925, 1926, 1932, 1934, 1940, 1947, 1952, 1954, 1969, 1971, 1974, 1975, 1979, 1993, 1995, 1997, 1999, 2007, 2012, 2018, 2024
2	Cork Constitution	30	1905, 1906, 1907, 1910, 1922, 1923, 1929, 1933, 1942, 1943, 1946, 1957, 1961, 1964, 1965, 1967, 1970, 1972, 1973, 1983, 1985, 1989, 2009, 2013, 2014, 2015, 2016, 2017, 2019, 2020
3	Shannon	19	1960, 1977, 1978, 1982, 1986, 1987, 1988, 1991, 1992, 1996, 1998, 2000, 2001, 2002, 2003, 2004, 2005, 2006, 2008
4	UCC	18	1887, 1888, 1897, 1900, 1901, 1912, 1913, 1935, 1936, 1937, 1939, 1941, 1950, 1951, 1955, 1963, 1976, 1981
5	Young Munster	10	1928, 1930, 1938, 1980, 1984, 1990, 2010, 2021, 2022, 2023
6	Dolphin	6	1921, 1931, 1944, 1945, 1948, 1956
7	Bohemians	4	1927, 1958, 1959, 1962
8	Sunday's Well	3	1949, 1953, 1994
8	Highfield	3	1966, 1968, 2026
10	Bandon	1	1886
10	Bruff	1	2011
10	Nenagh Ormond	1	2025

== List of winners ==
=== 1880s ===
- 1885–86 Bandon beat Garryowen
- 1886–87 Queens College beat Limerick County
- 1887–88 Queens College beat Garryowen
- 1888–89 Garryowen beat Limerick County

=== 1890s ===
- 1890 Garryowen beat Queens College
- 1891 Garryowen
- 1892 Garryowen beat Queens College
- 1893 Garryowen beat Cork
- 1894 Garryowen
- 1895 Garryowen beat Cork County
- 1896 Garryowen beat Cork County
- 1897 Queens College beat Rockwell College
- 1898 Garryowen beat Queens College
- 1899 Garryowen beat Queens College 10-3

=== 1900s ===
- 1900 Queens College beat Tralee
- 1901 Queens College beat Cork Constitution
- 1902 Garryowen beat Rockwell College
- 1903 Garryowen beat Queens College
- 1904 Garryowen beat Rockwell College
- 1905 Cork Constitution beat Queens College
- 1906 Cork Constitution beat Garryowen
- 1907 Cork Constitution beat Garryowen
- 1908 Garryowen beat Rockwell College
- 1909 Garryowen beat Lansdowne

=== 1910s ===
- 1910 Cork Constitution beat Lansdowne
- 1911 Garryowen beat Landsdowne
- 1912 UCC beat Garryowen
- 1913 UCC beat Garryowen
- 1914 Garryowen beat UCC
- 1915
- 1916
- 1917
- 1918
- 1919

=== 1920s ===
- 1920 Garryowen beat Cork Constitution
- 1921 Dolphin RFC beat Cork Constitution
- 1922 Cork Constitution beat Garryowen
- 1923 Cork Constitution beat Garryowen
- 1924 Garryowen
- 1925 Garryowen
- 1926 Garryowen
- 1927 Bohemians beat Dolphin
- 1928 Young Munster beat Cork Constitution
- 1929 Cork Constitution beat Young Munster

=== 1930s ===
- 1930 Young Munster beat UCC
- 1931 Dolphin beat Garryowen
- 1932 Garryowen beat Cork Constitution
- 1933 Cork Constitution beat Bohemians
- 1934 Garryowen beat Sundays Well
- 1935 UCC beat Cork Constitution
- 1936 UCC beat Cork Constitution
- 1937 UCC beat Garryowen
- 1938 Young Munster beat UCC
- 1939 UCC beat Bohemians

=== 1940s ===
- 1940 Garryowen beat Dolphin
- 1941 UCC beat Dolphin
- 1942 Cork Constitution beat UCC
- 1943 Cork Constitution beat Army
- 1944 Dolphin beat Garryowen
- 1945 Dolphin beat Army
- 1946 Cork Constitution beat Garryowen
- 1947 Garryowen beat Young Munster
- 1948 Dolphin beat Young Munster
- 1949 Sundays Well beat Dolphin

=== 1950s ===
- 1949–50 UCC beat Garryowen
- 1950–51 UCC beat Dolphin
- 1951–52 Garryowen beat UCC
- 1952–53 Sundays Well beat Garryowen
- 1953–54 Garryowen beat Sundays Well
- 1954–55 UCC beat Old Crescent
- 1955–56 Dolphin beat Sundays Well
- 1956–57 Cork Constitution
- 1957–58 Bohemians beat Highfield
- 1958–59 Bohemians beat Shannon

=== 1960s ===
- 1959–60 Shannon beat UCC 8–8, 6–3 (replay)
- 1960–61 Cork Constitution beat Garryowen
- 1961–62 Bohemians beat Old Crescent
- 1962–63 UCC beat Sundays Well
- 1963–64 Cork Constitution beat Young Munster
- 1964–65 Cork Constitution beat Sundays Well
- 1965–66 Highfield beat UCC
- 1966–67 Cork Constitution beat Highfield
- 1967–68 Highfield beat Cork Constitution
- 1968–69 Garryowen beat Sundays Well

=== 1970s ===
- 1969–70 Cork Constitution beat Garryowen
- 1970–71 Garryowen beat Young Munster
- 1971–72 Cork Constitution beat Garryowen
- 1972–73 Cork Constitution beat Dolphin
- 1973–74 Garryowen beat Shannon
- 1974–75 Garryowen beat Cork Constitution
- 1975–76 UCC beat Dolphin
- 1976–77 Shannon beat Garryowen
- 1977–78 Shannon beat Garryowen
- 1978–79 Garryowen beat Young Munster

=== 1980s ===
- 1979–80 Young Munster beat Bohemians
- 1980–81 UCC beat Shannon
- 1981–82 Shannon beat Young Munster
- 1982–83 Cork Constitution beat Shannon
- 1983–84 Young Munster beat Waterpark
- 1984–85 Cork Constitution beat Shannon
- 1985–86 Shannon beat Garryowen
- 1986–87 Shannon beat Highfield
- 1987–88 Shannon beat Garryowen
- 1988–89 Cork Constitution beat shannon

=== 1990s ===
- 1989–90 Young Munster beat UCC
- 1990–91 Shannon beat Young Munster
- 1991–92 Shannon beat Young Munster
- 1992–93 Garryowen beat Young Munster
- 1993–94 Sundays Well beat Young Munster
- 1994–95 Garryowen beat Young Munster
- 1995–96 Shannon beat Cork Constitution
- 1996–97 Garryowen beat Young Munster
- 1997–98 Shannon beat Young Munster
- 1998–99 Garryowen beat Cork Constitution

=== 2000s ===
- 1999–2000 Shannon beat Young Munster
- 2000–01 Shannon beat Young Munster
- 2001–02 Shannon beat Young Munster
- 2002–03 Shannon beat Midleton
- 2003–04 Shannon beat Garryowen
- 2004–05 Shannon beat Garryowen
- 2005–06 Shannon beat Dolphin
- 2006–07 Garryowen beat Cork Constitution
- 2007–08 Shannon beat Highfield 12–6
- 2008–09 Cork Constitution beat Old Crescent

=== 2010s ===
- 2009–10 Young Munster beat UCC 22–13
- 2010–11 Bruff beat Garryowen 23–19
- 2011–12 Garryowen beat Bruff 19–9
- 2012–13 Cork Constitution beat UL-Bohemians 15–14
- 2013–14 Cork Constitution beat Garryowen 9–6
- 2014–15 Cork Constitution beat Garryowen 26–22
- 2015–16 Cork Constitution beat Young Munster 14–7
- 2016–17 Cork Constitution beat Young Munster 14–0
- 2017–18 Garryowen beat UL Bohemian 18–3
- 2018–19Cork Constitution beat Garryowen 26–23
- 2019–20 Cork Constitution beat Young Munster 24–17

=== 2020s ===
- 2020–21 Young Munster beat Shannon 26–14
- 2021–22 Young Munster beat Garryowen 11–8
- 2022–23 Young Munster beat Nenagh Ormond 27-24
- 2023–24 Garryowen beat Cork Constitution 22-7
- 2024–25 Nenagh Ormond beat Old Crescent 32-20
- 2025–26 Highfield beat Shannon 19-17

== See also ==
- Connacht Senior Cup
- Leinster Senior Cup
- Ulster Senior Cup

== External sources ==
- The Carling Story of Munster Rugby by Charlie Mulqueen
