= Tommy O'Donnell =

Irish rugby union player

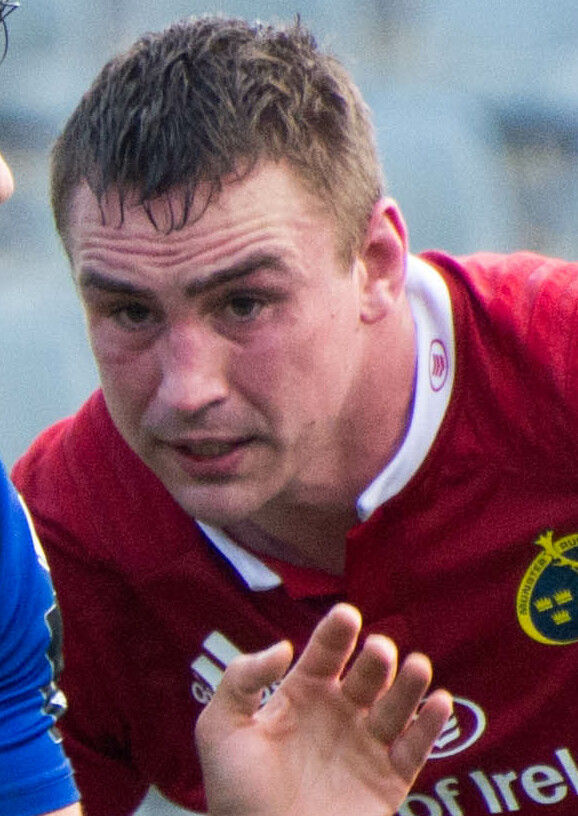
- O'Donnell in 2017
- Born: Thomas O'Donnell; 21 June 1987 (age 39) Cahir, Ireland
- Height: 1.85 m (6 ft 1 in)
- Weight: 105 kg (16.5 st; 231 lb)

Rugby union career
- Position: Flanker
Amateur team(s)
Years	Team	Apps	(Points)
- Clanwilliam
- UL Bohemians
Senior career
Years	Team	Apps	(Points)
2007–2021	Munster	187	(100)
- Correct as of 28 May 2021
International career
Years	Team	Apps	(Points)
2007	Ireland U20	3	(0)
2013–2019	Ireland	13	(10)
2014	Ireland Wolfhounds	1	(0)
2014	Emerging Ireland	3	(5)
- Correct as of 10 August 2019

Tommy O'Donnell (born 21 May 1987) is an Irish former rugby union player, who spent his entire career with his native province of Munster, whilst also earning 13 international caps for Ireland. After retiring in 2021, O'Donnell moved into coaching and joined Munster's academy staff in 2022.

== Early life ==
O'Donnell began playing rugby for Clanwilliam at an underage level, before progressing to senior level. He also played for East Munster and Irish Youths whilst at Clanwilliam.

== Munster ==
O'Donnell made his Munster debut against Scarlets on 22 September 2007, during a Magners League fixture. He was part of the historic Munster team that beat Australia 15–6 at Thomond Park on 16 November 2010. He made his Heineken Cup debut off the bench during Munster's 19–13 victory against Scarlets on 18 December 2011.

He signed a new two-year contract with Munster in March 2012. O'Donnell made his first Heineken Cup start in the quarter-final against Ulster on 8 April 2012. He was named Munster Player of the Year for the 2012–13 season, following in the footsteps of teammates Donnacha Ryan, James Coughlan, Mick O'Driscoll, David Wallace, John Hayes and Ronan O'Gara. O'Donnell signed a new contract with Munster in November 2013 which will see him remain with the province until June 2016. He made his return from a knee injury sustained in September 2013 for Munster A on 6 December 2013.

He was nominated for the 2015 Munster Rugby Senior Player of the Year Award in April 2015. O'Donnell won his 100th cap for Munster on 25 April 2015, scoring a try in the 30–19 win against Benetton and winning the Man-of-the-Match award. He was named in the 2014–15 Pro12 Dream Team, alongside teammate CJ Stander. In December 2015, O'Donnell signed a three-year contract with Munster. On 27 December 2015, O'Donnell made his return from the injury he sustained during the World Cup with Ireland, coming off the bench against Leinster during a 2015–16 Pro12 game.

On 3 September 2016, O'Donnell won the Man-of-the-Match award in Munster's win against Scarlets in the opening round of the 2016–17 Pro12. On 11 November 2016, O'Donnell captained Munster for the first time and led them to a historic 27–14 win against the Māori All Blacks. O'Donnell won his 150th cap for Munster on 21 October 2017, doing so in the 2017–18 European Rugby Champions Cup fixture against Racing 92. O'Donnell made his return from a shoulder injury sustained in early November 2017 on 8 December 2017, playing the full 80 minutes for Munster A in their 2017–18 British and Irish Cup defeat at the hands of Bedford Blues. However, O'Donnell suffered a recurrence of the shoulder injury during Munster's 2017–18 Pro14 round 18 win against Scarlets which subsequently required surgery, ruling him out for the remainder of the 2017–18 season.

He scored two tries in Munster's 64–7 win against Ulster in round 5 of the 2018–19 Pro14 on 29 September 2018. O'Donnell signed a two-year contract extension with Munster in October 2018, a deal that will see him remain with the province until at least June 2021. He suffered an ankle injury during Munster's Champions Cup win against Gloucester on 20 October 2018; he returned from the injury during Munster's fixture against Ulster on 21 December 2018.

After 14 seasons with the province, O'Donnell retired at the end of the 2020–21 season. His final appearance for the province was in their 31–27 win against Cardiff Blues in round 4 of the Pro14 Rainbow Cup on 28 May 2021. O'Donnell joined Munster's academy staff as an elite player development officer ahead of the 2022–23 season.

== Ireland ==
O'Donnell has been capped for Ireland at under-18 and under-20 level and was part of the under-20 Grand Slam-winning team in 2007. He received his first senior call-up on 21 January 2013 when he was drafted into Ireland's 2013 Six Nations Championship training squad. O'Donnell made his debut for Ireland Wolfhounds on 25 January 2013, starting in the friendly against England Saxons. He was added to Ireland's Six Nations squad for the fixture against Scotland on 18 February 2013.

O'Donnell was named in the Ireland squad for the 2013 Ireland tour to North America on 19 May 2013. He made his debut for the senior Ireland team on 8 June 2013, coming on as a replacement against the United States. O'Donnell made his first start for Ireland against Canada on 15 June 2013, also scoring his first try for Ireland in the game.

O'Donnell started for Ireland Wolfhounds in their friendly against England Saxons on 25 January 2014. On 27 January 2014, O'Donnell was named in Ireland's 34-man squad for the opening two fixtures of the 2014 Six Nations Championship. He came off the bench against Scotland on 2 February 2014. O'Donnell came off the bench against Wales on 8 February 2014. O'Donnell was selected in the Emerging Ireland squad on 26 May 2014. He started against Russia in their first 2014 IRB Nations Cup match on 13 June 2014, scoring a try. O'Donnell started in their second game against Uruguay on 18 June 2014. He came off the bench in the 31–10 win Romania on 22 June 2014, a win that secured the 2014 IRB Nations Cup for Emerging Ireland.

O'Donnell was named in the Ireland squad for the 2014 November Tests on 21 October 2014. He came off the bench during the 29–15 win against South Africa on 8 November 2014. O'Donnell started in the 49–7 win against Georgia on 16 November 2014.

He was named in the Ireland squad for the opening rounds of the 2015 Six Nations Championship on 1 February 2015. He started against Italy on 7 February 2015, scoring a try in Ireland's 26–3 win. He came off the bench in the 19–9 win against England on 1 March 2015. England's failure to score enough points against France meant Ireland won the 2015 Six Nations Championship, the first time Ireland had won back-to-back championships since 1948–49.

O'Donnell was named in the 45-man training squad for the 2015 Rugby World Cup on 24 June 2015. He started in the first World Cup warm-up against Wales on 8 August 2015, but went off injured in the second half. On 10 August 2015, it was confirmed that O'Donnell had dislocated his hip, requiring a minimum of 6 weeks non-weight bearing activity, ruling him out of the 2015 Rugby World Cup.

On 20 January 2016, O'Donnell was named in Ireland's 35-man squad for the 2016 Six Nations Championship. On 7 February 2016, O'Donnell started against Wales in Ireland's opening match of the Six Nations. On 13 February 2016, O'Donnell came off the bench against France to replace Seán O'Brien after he went off injured. On 23 January 2017, O'Donnell was named in the Ireland squad for the opening two rounds of the 2017 Six Nations Championship. O'Donnell was also selected in the squad for the 2017 Summer Tour against the United States and Japan. However, an ankle injury ruled O'Donnell out of the tour.

== Statistics ==
=== International analysis by opposition ===
Against	Played	Won	Lost	Drawn	Tries	Points	% Won
Canada	1	1	0	0	1	5	100
England	1	1	0	0	0	0	100
France	1	0	1	0	0	0	0
Georgia	1	1	0	0	0	0	100
Italy	2	2	0	0	1	5	100
Scotland	2	2	0	0	0	0	100
South Africa	1	1	0	0	0	0	100
United States	1	1	0	0	0	0	100
Wales	3	2	0	1	0	0	66.67
Total	13	11	1	1	2	10	84.62

Correct as of 10 August 2019

== Honours ==
=== Ireland ===
- Six Nations Championship:
  - Winner (2): 2014, 2015

=== Emerging Ireland ===
- World Rugby Nations Cup
  - Winner (1): (2014)

== Personal life ==
On 24 June 2016, O'Donnell married Elisse O'Grady in Kenmare, County Kerry.
