= Munster Junior League (rugby union) =

Irish rugby union league

- Sport: Rugby Union
- Instituted: 1991; 35 years ago
- Inaugural season: 1991–92
- Number of teams: 38
- Region: Munster ( Ireland)
- Holders: Kilfeacle & District (2025–26)
- Most titles: Richmond (5 titles)
- Website: www.munsterrugby.ie/domestic/

The Munster Junior League is an annual Rugby Union competition for clubs with Junior status based in the province of Munster in Ireland. It is one of 4 provincial qualifying leagues for the All-Ireland League. The league typically runs from October to March each season with a break over the Christmas period. The current title holders are Kilfeacle & District. Having been runners-up in 2025, they won the league for a third time in 2026.

== History ==
The Munster Branch of the I.R.F.U. held the first pan Munster league competition for Junior clubs in 1991–92 and it has been held every season since (with the exception of the 2020–21 season which was cancelled due to the COVID-19 pandemic). In 1996 due to the expansion of the All-Ireland League, the league winners (Richmond) were promoted directly to the A.I.L. In the following seasons the league winners along with the winners of the Connacht J1 League, Leinster League and Ulster Rugby Championship qualified for the A.I.L. Round Robin competition in which the winners were promoted to the A.I.L. and the runners-up advanced to a play-off match for promotion.

Further expansion of the A.I.L. meant the league winners in 2011 (Cashel) gained promotion directly while the Round Robin series returned the following year. Since 2022 the series was replaced by the All-Ireland Provincial League Championship. Overall, the winners of the league have gained promotion to the A.I.L. on 11 occasions.

In the 34 seasons of the league 15 different clubs have won the league with Richmond, from Limerick being the most successful with 5 titles. Clonmel are the only club to have won 3 titles in-a-row.

== Format ==
The league has had several formats down through the years but since 2023–24 it has reverted to the format that was used just prior to the COVID-19 pandemic. The teams play in 3 divisions with 14 clubs each in Divisions 1 and 2 and the remaining teams in Division 3. The league uses a single round robin format with teams being awarded points based on the standard Rugby union bonus points system.

The team finishing top of Division 1 are declared champions and qualify for the All-Ireland Provincial League Championship. The top 4 teams in Division 1 qualify for the following season's All-Ireland Junior Cup.The bottom 2 teams in Divisions 1 and 2 are relegated while the top 2 teams in Divisions 2 and 3 are promoted.

Specific detailed rules apply where:

- If the league winners gain promotion to the All-Ireland League then the 5th placed team will take their place in the All-Ireland Junior Cup.
- The number of clubs relegated from Divisions 1 and 2 may change depending on whether clubs are promoted to or relegated from the All-Ireland League.

== Winners ==
- 1991–92: Thomond
- 1992–93: Bandon
- 1993–94: Youghal
- 1994–95: Kilfeacle & District
- 1995–96: Richmond†
- 1996–97: Midleton
- 1997–98: Midleton†
- 1998–99: Thomond†
- 1999–00: Bruff
- 2000–01: Clonakilty†
- 2001–02: Highfield†
- 2002–03: Bruff
- 2003–04: Bruff†
- 2004–05: Nenagh Ormond†
- 2005–06: Youghal
- 2006–07: Crosshaven
- 2007–08: Cashel
- 2008–09: Cashel
- 2009–10: Richmond
- 2010–11: Cashel†
- 2011–12: Richmond
- 2012–13: Richmond
- 2013–14: Kanturk†
- 2014–15: Clonmel
- 2015–16: Clonmel
- 2016–17: Clonmel
- 2017–18: Bandon
- 2018–19: Clonmel†
- 2019–20: Kilfeacle & District
- 2020–21: cancelled due to COVID-19 pandemic
- 2021–22: Newcastle West
- 2022–23: Richmond
- 2023–24: Thomond
- 2024–25: Thomond†
- 2025–26: Kilfeacle & District

† Also gained promotion to the All-Ireland League

== Roll of honour ==
	Team	Titles	Seasons
1	Richmond	5	1995–96, 2009–10, 2011–12, 2012–13, 2022–23
2	Clonmel	4	2014–15, 2015–16, 2016–17, 2018–19
2	Thomond	4	1991–92, 1998–99, 2023–24, 2024–25
4	Bruff	3	1999–00, 2002–03, 2003–04
4	Cashel	3	2007–08, 2008–09, 2010–11
4	Kilfeacle & District	3	1994–95, 2019–20, 2025–26
7	Midleton	2	1996–97, 1997–98
7	Youghal	2	1993–94, 2005–06
7	Bandon	2	1992–93, 2017–18
10	Clonakilty	1	2000–01
10	Highfield	1	2001–02
10	Nenagh Ormond	1	2004–05
10	Crosshaven	1	2006–07
10	Kanturk	1	2013–14
10	Newcastle West	1	2021–22

== Teams ==
- List of teams in Munster Junior League since 2025

Team	Location	Home Ground	Colours
Abbeyfeale	Abbeyfeale	The Grove	Black and yellow
Ballincollig	Ballincollig	Tanner Park	Black and white
Bandon	Bandon	Old Chapel	Royal blue and white
Bantry Bay	Bantry	Ballycommane	Red and blue
Carrick-on-Suir	Carrick-on-Suir	Tybroughney	Red and blue
Castleisland	Castleisland	Crageens	Red and blue
Charleville & District	Charleville	Shandrum	Red and white
Clanwilliam	Tipperary	Clanwilliam Park	Black and amber
Clonakilty	Clonakilty	The Vale	Red and green
Cobh Pirates	Cobh	The Paddocks	Black and white
Crosshaven	Crosshaven	Myrtleville Cross	Black, white, blue
Douglas	Cork (Douglas)	Castletreasure	Green and black
Dungarvan	Dungarvan	Ballyrandle	Blue and white
Ennis	Ennis	Drumbiggle Road	Red and black
Fethard & District	Fethard	Town Park	Navy and white
Fermoy	Fermoy	The Showgrounds	Forest green and yellow
Galbally-Mitchelstown	Galbally	Killinane	Red, white, black
Kanturk	Kanturk	Knocknacolan	Green and white
Kinsale	Kinsale	Snugmore	Blue, white, green
Kilfeacle & District	Kilfeacle	Morrissey Park	Sky blue and navy
Killarney	Killarney	Aghadoe	Red and black
Killorglin	Killorglin	Ballymalis	Navy and blue
Mallow	Mallow	Parkadillane	Green and black
Muskerry	Ballyanly	Ellis Park	Blue
Newcastle West	Newcastle West	Cullinagh	Black and white
Old Christians	Glanmire	Rathcooney	Black, red, yellow
Richmond	Limerick (Rhebogue)	Canal Bank	Green and white
Rugbaí Chorca Dhuibhne	Muiríoch	An Baile Loiscthe	Red and white
Scariff	Scariff	Cravens Field	Black and white
Skibbereen	Skibbereen	The Showgrounds	Red and white
St. Mary's	Limerick (Corbally)	Grove Island	Blue and white
St. Senan's	Shannon	Jimmy Slattery Park	Black and white
Sundays Well	Cork (Ballyphehane)	Musgrave Park	Red, white, green
Thurles	Thurles	Loughtagalla Park	Black and white
Tralee	Tralee	O'Dowd Park	Blue and white
Waterpark	Waterford	Ballinakill	Black and red
Waterford City	Waterford	Kilbarry	Navy and white
Youghal	Youghal	Frogmore	Black and amber

Source: Munster Rugby Red Book

== Current season (2026–27) ==
=== Division 1 ===
Table

Pos	Team	Pld	W	D	L	PF	PA	PD	TF	TA	TB	LB	Pts	Qualification
1	Kilfeacle & District	5	5	0	0	181	62	+119	29	9	4	0	24	All-Ireland Provincial League Championship & All-Ireland Junior Cup^{1}
2	Kinsale	5	3	1	1	169	159	+10	24	21	5	1	20	All-Ireland Junior Cup
3	Bandon	5	4	0	1	131	78	+53	16	11	2	1	19	All-Ireland Junior Cup
4	Sundays Well	5	3	0	2	182	140	+42	25	20	4	2	18	All-Ireland Junior Cup
5	St. Mary's	5	3	0	2	126	125	+1	19	17	4	0	16	
6	Old Christians	5	3	0	2	166	112	+54	25	16	3	1	16	
7	Skibbereen	5	3	0	2	112	136	−24	15	21	3	0	15	
8	Crosshaven	5	3	0	2	123	137	−14	16	20	2	1	15	
9	Clonakilty	5	2	0	3	106	102	+4	14	14	2	2	12	
10	Mallow	5	1	1	3	99	139	−40	15	19	3	2	11	
11	Newcastle West	5	1	1	3	71	128	−57	11	18	1	1	8	
12	Kanturk	5	1	0	4	120	176	−56	17	26	3	0	7	
13	Clanwilliam	5	0	1	4	122	138	−16	16	19	2	3	7	Relegation to Division 2
14	Richmond	5	1	0	4	84	160	−76	12	23	1	0	5	Relegation to Division 2

Updated to match(es) played on 8 November 2026. Source: Munster Domestic Rugby - Junior League Division 1
Rules for classification: 1) league points; 2) most wins; 3) most draws 4) most bonus points; 5) most try bonus points; 6) most losing bonus points; 7) lowest points deducted; 8) points difference in league; 9) points difference in matches between tied teams

^{1} If the League Champions gain promotion to the All-Ireland League then the 5th placed team will take their place in the All-Ireland Junior Cup.

=== Division 2 ===
Table

Pos	Team	Pld	W	D	L	PF	PA	PD	TF	TA	TB	LB	Pts	Qualification
1	Ennis	5	5	0	0	210	67	+143	32	9	5	0	25	Promotion to Division 1
2	Muskerry	5	4	0	1	186	104	+82	31	14	5	1	22	Promotion to Division 1
3	Ballincollig	5	4	0	1	174	98	+76	25	16	5	1	22	
4	Youghal	5	4	0	1	160	66	+94	21	9	2	1	19	
5	Cobh Pirates	5	4	0	1	108	99	+9	16	14	2	0	18	
6	Thurles	5	3	0	2	157	77	+80	24	11	3	1	16	
7	Killarney	5	3	0	2	141	110	+31	20	14	2	2	16	
8	St. Senan's	5	3	0	2	136	134	+2	18	20	2	0	14	
9	Tralee	5	2	0	3	106	171	−65	15	27	2	0	10	
10	Carrick-on-Suir	5	2	0	3	84	136	−52	12	20	1	0	9	
11	Waterpark	5	1	0	4	79	160	−81	11	21	1	0	5	
12	Fermoy	5	0	0	5	89	171	−82	13	26	1	1	2	
13	Charleville & District	5	0	0	5	75	205	−130	11	31	0	2	2	Relegation to Division 3
14	Castleisland	5	0	0	5	63	170	−107	10	27	0	0	0	Relegation to Division 3

Updated to match(es) played on 8 November 2026. Source: Munster Domestic Rugby - Junior League Division 2
Rules for classification: 1) league points; 2) most wins; 3) most draws 4) most bonus points; 5) most try bonus points; 6) most losing bonus points; 7) lowest points deducted; 8) points difference in league; 9) points difference in matches between tied teams

=== Division 3 ===
Table

Pos	Team	Pld	W	D	L	PF	PA	PD	TF	TA	TB	LB	Pts	Qualification
1	Abbeyfeale	4	4	0	0	134	78	+56	23	12	4	0	20	Promotion to Division 2
2	Killorglin	4	4	0	0	98	40	+58	14	5	2	0	18	Promotion to Division 2
3	Scariff	4	3	0	1	103	90	+13	16	13	3	0	15	
4	Rugbaí Chorca Dhuibhne	4	3	0	1	118	91	+27	18	14	2	0	14	
5	Galbally-Mitchelstown	3	1	1	1	70	68	+2	10	9	1	0	7	
6	Fethard & District	4	1	0	3	92	94	−2	14	14	2	1	7	
7	Waterford City	4	1	0	3	73	94	−21	10	14	1	1	6	
8	Bantry Bay	4	1	0	3	61	95	−34	6	15	0	1	5	
9	Dungarvan	4	0	1	3	87	146	−59	14	23	2	0	4	
10	Douglas	3	0	0	3	40	80	−40	5	11	0	1	1	

Updated to match(es) played on 15 November 2026. Source: Munster Domestic Rugby - Junior League Division 3
Rules for classification: 1) league points; 2) most wins; 3) most draws 4) most bonus points; 5) most try bonus points; 6) most losing bonus points; 7) lowest points deducted; 8) points difference in league; 9) points difference in matches between tied teams

== See also ==
- Munster Junior Cup
