= Henry Wall (rugby union) =

Irish rugby union player

- Born: 1 December 1935 Cork, Ireland
- Died: 23 August 2016 (aged 80) Cork, Ireland
- School: Castleknock College
- University: University College Dublin
- Occupation: Veterinarian

Rugby union career
- Position: No. 8
International career
Years	Team	Apps	(Points)
1965	Ireland	2	(0)

Henry Wall (1 December 1935 — 23 August 2016) was an Irish rugby union international.

Wall was born in Cork and educated at Castleknock College.

A number eight, Wall played his early rugby for University College Dublin while studying for a veterinary degree and captained the club for two seasons. He played provincial rugby for Munster, notably scoring a try against the touring All Blacks in 1964. The following year, Wall was called up by Ireland for the 1965 Five Nations, to replace an injured Ronnie Lamont. He was aged 28 and playing at the time for Cork club Dolphin. Capped twice, Wall debuted in Ireland's win over Scotland at Murrayfield and also played in the loss to Wales in Cardiff.

== See also ==
- List of Ireland national rugby union players
