= Dolphin RFC =

Irish rugby union club, based in Cork

Dolphin
- Full name: Dolphin Rugby Football Club
- Union: (Ireland) IRFU
- Branch: Munster
- Founded: 1902; 124 years ago
- Ground(s): Musgrave Park, Cork (Capacity: 9,200)
- Chairman: Paul Hourican
- President: Kate Kelly
- Director of Rugby: Kieran Murray
- Coach(es): David O'Mahony, Eamonn Mills Dave O'Mahony,
- Captain: Cam O'Shaughnessy
- League: All-Ireland League, Div. 2C
- 2024–25: 3rd.
Team kit

Official website
- dolphinrfc.com

Dolphin Rugby Football Club is a rugby union club in Cork. The senior team play in Division 2BS of the All-Ireland League. In the 2023–24 season, the club fielded more Adult Teams in competitive action than any other club in Munster, in fielding 6 Adult sides (4 Men's, an U21 side and a Women's Team (in Division 1 of the Munster League). In addition to this 3 Youth Sides, 3 Girls sides and 7 Minis teams.

== History ==
The club was founded in 1902, by members of the Dolphin Swimming Club who were seeking to find a wintertime activity. Initially a Junior club they gained Senior status in 1913 after winning the Munster Junior Cup that year for the first time. Their first Munster Senior Cup came in 1921 and in 1942 the club moved to their current home at Musgrave Park A clubhouse was completed in 1956 with further facilities added in 1976. The club was not a member of the All-Ireland League for the inaugural season in 1990-91 but won promotion to the League the following season. The club won Division 2 of the League in 2002–03, the club's centenary season. In 2021, the club decided the time was right to set up Women and Girls teams. This has been very successful, the Women were promoted to Division 1 of the Munster Senior League and we have U14, U16 & U18.5 sides.In this short period, 7 of the girls have played for Munster U18's, Irish U18 (7's & 15's, Irish U20 and 2 have played for the Munster Senior Women's side.

== Honours ==
- All Ireland League Division 2 Champions 2003
- Munster Senior Cup Winners (6): 1921, 1931, 1944–45, 1948 and 1956.
- Munster Junior Cup (4):1913, 1923, 1926, 1944.
- Munster Junior Plate: 1985.
- Munster Under 20 League: 1984.
- Munster Senior League: (8) 1924, 1926, 1929, 1949, 1955, 1956, 1973 and 1991.

== Notable Past Players ==
Former Irish Coach, Declan Kidney played for the club in the 1980s and early 1990s. Michael Kiernan, with 43, is the club's most capped international player. J S McCarthy and Terry Kingston both captained Ireland. Tomás O'Leary was the scrum half on Ireland's 2009 Grandslam winning team. The club's top try scorer in The AIB League & Cup is James Coughlan with 37, Coughlan was captain of the Munster side that beat Australia in 2010.

The following have represented Ireland at full international level whilst playing with Dolphin;

- Michael Kiernan (43)
- Terry Kingston (29)
- Tony O'Reilly (29) capped also with Old Belvedere + others
- J S McCarthy (28)
- Tomás O'Leary (23)
- Johnny O'Meara (22)
- Phil O'Callaghan (21)
- Charles J. O'Hanrahan (20)
- Niall Scannell (20) 2017 to date
- Mick Doyle (20) also with Blackrock College, UCD, Cambridge University
- Michael Bradley (19)
- Fergus Aherne (16)
- Bertie O'Hanlon (12)
- Paddy Lawlor (12)
- Rory Scannell (3)
- Dave O'Loughlin (6)
- Maurice Mortell
- Jack Clarke
- Gerald Reidy (5)
- Fred Williamson
- Ted Ryan
- James Cronin (3)
- Henry Wall (2)
- Jack Mahony (1)

IRFU Presidents

- 1955/56 C J Hanrahan
- 1973/74 I F Mahony
- 1983/84 G F Reidy
