= Clonmel RFC =

Irish rugby union club, based in Clonmel, Co. Tipperary

(Republic of Ireland) Clonmel RFC
- Full name: Clonmel Rugby Football Club
- Union: (Ireland) IRFU
- Branch: Munster
- Founded: 1882; 144 years ago
- Region: Tipperary
- Ground: Ard Gaoithe
- Chairman: Paddy O'Donnell
- President: Johnny Sheehan
- Director of Rugby: Fergal Buttimer
- Coach: Patrick O Connor
- Captain: Henry Buttimer
- League: A.I.L. Div. 2C
- 2024–25: 6th.
Team kit

Official website
- clonmelrfc.ie

Clonmel RFC is an Irish rugby union team based in Clonmel, County Tipperary, in the province of Munster. They play in Division 2C of the All-Ireland League.

The club was founded in 1882, and fields both men's and women's XV teams as well as several age-grade teams including a minis section. The club has won the Munster Junior League on four occasions. Following the League victory in 2018–19 the club gained senior status by winning promotion to the All-Ireland League for the first time in the club's history.

== Notable players ==
- Niamh Briggs
- Dave Foley
- Eoghan Grace
- Bill Johnston
- Rory Moroney
- Sean Reidy

== Honours ==
- Munster Junior League

Winners: 2014-15, 2015-16, 2016-17, 2018-19

- Munster Junior Cup

Winners: 2014

- Munster Junior Clubs Challenge Cup

Winners: 2018
