= Cashel RFC =

Irish rugby union club, based in Cashel

Cashel
- Full name: Cashel Rugby Football Club
- Union: (Ireland) IRFU
- Branch: Munster
- Founded: 1919; 107 years ago
- Location: Cashel, County Tipperary
- Ground(s): Spafield, Cashel (Capacity: ~2,500)
- League: All-Ireland Div. 2A
- 2024–25: 2nd.
Team kit

Cashel Rugby Football Club is a rugby union club based in Cashel, County Tipperary, Ireland, playing in Division 2A of the All-Ireland League. Cashel RFC has a 'minis rugby' section which caters for children from U7s up to U12s, a juvenile section for U14s, U16s and U18 and halfs, and a Ladies Rugby section which includes Girls Tag, U18s and a Senior Ladies Team and 3 Senior teams 3rds 2nds and a 1st team.

The club was founded in 1919 and has had wins at underage and junior rugby levels in Munster. Its grounds are located at Spafield, near the town of Cashel.

In 2009 the club won an unprecedented nine cups. In the same year, the club also redeveloped its facilities and club house. Cashel R.F.C have three regulation pitches along with a training pitch.

As of the 2019/2020 season Cashel were playing in the Ulster Bank All-Ireland League Division 2A.

== Notable players ==
- Paddy Butler
- Denis Fogarty
- John Fogarty
- Denis Leamy
