= Waterpark RFC =

Irish rugby union club, based in Waterford

(Republic of Ireland) Waterpark RFC
- Full name: Waterpark Rugby Football Club
- Union: (Ireland) IRFU
- Branch: Munster
- Founded: 1925; 101 years ago
- Location: Waterford, Ireland
- Ground: Ballinakill (Capacity: 500)
- League: Division 2, Munster Junior League
Team kit

Waterpark Rugby Football Club is rugby union club in Waterford, Ireland.

It was founded in 1925, and plays it home games at Ballinakill, Waterford. The 1st XV currently competes in Division 2 of the Munster Junior League and in competitions organized by the Munster Branch of the Irish Rugby Football Union.

== Roll of honour ==
- Munster Junior Cup Winners 1938, 1974

All Ireland League Div 3 -Winners 2002/03 (Promoted to Div 2)

All Ireland Div 4 -Runners up 1993/94 (Promoted to Div 3)

All-Ireland League 17's -Winners 2009/10

All Ireland Ladies Div 2 League -Winners 2007/08

All Ireland Ladies Plate -Winners 2007/08

All Ireland Ladies Bowl -Winners 2006/07 -Runners Up 2003/03

Munster Rugby "YOUTH CLUB OF THE YEAR" -Winners 2009/10, 2010/11

Munster Senior Cup -Runners up 1984 (Aidan Walsh)

Munster Junior Cup -Winners 1938, 1941, 1974 (Gerry Halley)

Omagh Senior 7's -Winners 1978 (Gerry Walsh)

Munster Senior 7's -Winners 1980 (Gerry Walsh)

Munster Junior 7's -Runners up 2009/10

Kinsale 7's -Winners 1996, 1998 -Runners up 1999

East Munster Casey Cup -Winners 1989/90, 2001/02, 2002/03, 2005/06, 2008/09, 2009/10

East Munster Ballyrandle Cup -Winners 1980/81, 2005/06, 2009/10

South Munster Junior 2 Cup -Runners up 2011/12

South Munster Division 2 Cup 21's -Winners 2008/09

South Munster Division 1 Cup 21's -Runners up 2009/10

Munster Under 20s Cup -Winners 1979/80 (John O'Neill)

Munster League 19s -Winners 2009/10 (Lorcan Healy), 2010/11 (Gregg Staff)

East Munster League 19s -Winners 2009/10 (Lorcan Healy), 2010/11 (Gregg Staff), 2011/12

East Munster Cup 19s Winners 2009/10 (Lorcan Healy), 2011/12 -Runners Up 2010/11 (Gregg Staff)

Munster League 18's -Winners 2006/07 (Willie Walsh), -Winners 2007/08 (Paul Molloy)

East Munster League 18's -Winners 2005/06 (Paul Hackett) 2006/07 (Willie Walsh) 2007/08 (Paul Molloy)

East Munster Cup 18's -Winners 2006/07 (Willie Walsh) -Winners 2007/08 (Paul Molloy) -Winners 2008/09 (Tom Walsh)

Munster League 17's -Winners 2009/10 (Tom Kiersey), 2010/11 (Jack Donohoe)

East Munster League 17's -Winners 2009/10 (Tom Kiersey), 2010/11 (Jack Donohoe), 2011/12

East Munster Cup 17's -Winners 2010/11 (Jack Donohoe), 2011/12

East Munster Plate 17's -Winners 2009/10 (Tom Kiersey)

Munster League 16's

2005/06 (Paul Molloy), 2006/07 (Jack Molloy) 2007/08 (Greg Staff), 2008/09 (Jack O'Donoghue)

East Munster League 16's -Winners 2005/06, 2006/07, 2007/08, 2008/09, 2009/10, 2012/13, 2013/14, 2014/15

East Munster Cup 16's

-Winners 2004/05 ( William Walsh) 2005/06 (Paul Molloy), 2006/07 (Jack Molloy) 2007/08 (Greg Staff), 2008/09 (Jack O'Donoghue)

East Munster League 15s -Winners 2011/12 -Runners Up 2010/11 (Dylan Power)

East Munster Cup 15'*s -Winners 2010/11 (Dylan Power) -Runners-up 2009/10 (Gareth Molloy)

East Munster Dev League 15's -Winners 2005/06 (Stephen Heffernan)

East Munster Plate 15's -Winners 2010/11, 2011/12

East Munster League 14's -Winners 2004/05, 2008/09

East Munster Cup 14's -Winners 2003/04, 2008/09

East Munster League 13's -Winners 2011/12

East Munster Cup 13's -Winners 2011/12

East Munster Development League 13's -Winners 2003/04 (Jack Molloy)

== Under-age success ==
In the 2006-07 season the club's Under-16s and Under-18s both won the Munster club rugby titles. These are following a number of years of dominance in the club's provincial division East Munster. This has resulted in a large of numbers of players going on to represent Waterpark on the East Munster team (who have also won the last two Munster inter-divisional titles).

== Notable players and coaches ==
Darren Coleman, former player-coach of Waterpark RFC, later became a successful professional head coach, winning the United States Major League Rugby Championship and the Australian Club Championship.
