= Crosshaven RFC =

Rugby union club in County Cork, Ireland

(Republic of Ireland) Crosshaven
- Full name: Crosshaven Rugby Football Club
- Union: (Ireland) IRFU; Munster
- Founded: 1972; 54 years ago
- Ground(s): Myrtleville Cross, Crosshaven
- League: Munster Junior League Division 2
Team kit

Crosshaven RFC (Crosshaven Rugby Football Club) is a rugby union club based in Crosshaven, County Cork, Ireland. The club grounds, located at Myrtleville Cross in Crosshaven, has three pitches, floodlights, parking, changing rooms and a gym.

Founded in 1972, the club's senior team plays in the Munster Junior League Division 2. In addition to the senior men's team, Crosshaven RFC has underage teams ranging from under 8s to under 18s. One product of the youth system is former Munster Rugby and Leicester Tigers scrum-half Frank Murphy who began his playing career with the club.

In the 2010/2011 season, Crosshaven won the All-Ireland Junior Cup, becoming the first club in Munster to win the title.
