= Dylan Donnellan =

Irish rugby union player

- Born: 1 December 1994 (age 31) Galway, Ireland
- Height: 1.78 m (5 ft 10 in)
- Weight: 95 kg (15.0 st; 209 lb)
- School: Clongowes Wood College

Rugby union career
- Position: Hooker
Amateur team(s)
Years	Team	Apps	(Points)
2016-2018	Clontarf		
2018-	Clontarf		
- Correct as of 30 October 2023
Senior career
Years	Team	Apps	(Points)
2014–2016	Biarritz	2	(0)
2018–2019	Leeds Tykes	11	(0)
2023-2024	Leinster	2	(0)
International career
Years	Team	Apps	(Points)
2014–2015	Ireland U20	5	

Dylan Donnellan (born 1 December 1994) is an Irish rugby union player, recently played for United Rugby Championship and European Rugby Champions Cup side Leinster. His preferred position is hooker. He was a member of the Clontarf team that won the All-Ireland League in 2021–22 and captained them to the A.I.L. title in 2024–25, scoring a try in both finals.

== Leinster ==
Donnellan was named in the Leinster Rugby academy for the 2013–14 season. He left the academy and joined Biarritz playing for two seasons in the ProD2 in France. He moved back to Dublin in 2016 playing for local club Clontarf and then moved to Leeds Tykes for a season in 2018-19 before returning to Ireland to play again for Clontarf in the AIL League. He was called up as a short-term injury replacement by Leinster in October 2023 and made his debut in Round 2 of the 2023–24 United Rugby Championship against the Sharks.
