= Highfield R.F.C. =

Irish rugby union club, based in Cork

(Republic of Ireland) Highfield
- Full name: Highfield Rugby Football Club
- Union: (Ireland) IRFU
- Branch: Munster
- Nickname: "The Field"
- Founded: 1930; 96 years ago
- Region: Cork
- Ground(s): Woodleigh Park, Cork (Capacity: ~5,000)
- Chairman: Eugene Carley
- President: Billy Daly
- Coach: James Cronin
- Captain: Jamie Shanahan
- League: All-Ireland Div. 1B
- 2024–25: 8th
Team kit

Official website
- highfieldrfc.ie

Highfield Rugby Football Club is a rugby union club based in Cork, Ireland, playing in Division 1B of the All-Ireland League.

Highfield was founded in 1930 and was elevated to senior status in the province of Munster in 1953. Before moving to its present grounds at Woodleigh Park, the club was based in fields off Magazine Road between Highfield Avenue and Highfield West, where the team derived its name. The current ground is now located near a park called Highfield Lawn. The club currently fields teams in Division 1B of the All-Ireland League. Irish Rugby union international.

The club also has a women's team who participate in Division 1 of the All Ireland League (AIL), featuring two former Irish international players, Laura Guest and Heather O'Brien who were part of the 2013 Six Nations Grand Slam winning team. The Munster Cup competition was retired in 2013 meaning that the club retain the cup as they were the holders in that season.

== Facility ==
In January 2011, Highfield RFC unveiled a new flood-lit, all-weather facility; comprising three 'state-of-the-art' astro-turf pitches. These pitches are available to all Highfield teams for training and allow training programmes during the winter months. The pitches are also used for five-a-side soccer, tag rugby and other sports and activities. In 2019 a new, state-of-the-art gym was added at the grounds.

== Honours ==
=== Senior team ===
- Munster Senior League - 1990
- Munster Senior Cup (3) - 1966, 1968, 2026

=== Junior team ===
- All-Ireland Under-18 champions - 2009
- Munster Junior League Champions - 2001–02
- Munster Junior Cup (5) - 1937, 1942, 1945, 1972, 2019

=== Women's team ===
- Munster Cup (2) - 2005, 2013
- National Women's Cup - 2013
