= University College Cork R.F.C. =

Irish rugby union club, based in Cork

University College Cork
- Full name: University College Cork Rugby Football Club
- Union: (Ireland) IRFU
- Branch: Munster
- Founded: 1872; 154 years ago
- Region: Cork
- Ground: The Mardyke (Capacity: 5,000)
- Chairman: Vivian E Nathan
- President: John Fitzgerald
- Coach: Ger Burke
- Captain: Sam O'Sullivan
- League: All-Ireland Div. 1B
- 2024–25: 4th.
Team kit

Official website
- www.uccrugby.ie

University College Cork Rugby Football Club is an Irish rugby union club which plays in Division 1B of the All-Ireland League. Founded in 1872, they originally played under the college's former name, Queen's College Cork. UCC won the inaugural All-Ireland U-20 Championship in 1996 with a team that included Ronan O'Gara and Frankie Sheahan while more recently, UCC again won the All Ireland U-20 Championship in 2002. In the same year, they also reached the AIB League playoffs for the first time, narrowly missing out on promotion to Division 1. Leading players in that team included Denis Leamy, Stephen Keogh and Frank Murphy, all of whom went on to play for Munster.

== Honours ==
- All-Ireland Cup
  - 1935-36: 1
- Munster Senior League
  - 1913, 1914, 1931, 1933. 1934, 1936, 1942 1943, 1945, 1950, 1961, 1962, 1963, 1974, 1978, 1981, 1985: 17
- Munster Senior Cup
  - 1887, 1888, 1897, 1900, 1901, 1912, 1913, 1935, 1936, 1937, 1939, 1941, 1950, 1951, 1955, 1963, 1976, 1981: 18
- Munster Junior Cup
  - 1921, 1933, 1950, 1953, 1963, 1967, 1969, 1975, 1977, 1979, 2024: 11

== Notable former players ==
=== Ireland ===
In 1879 Ashley Cummins became the first UCC player to represent Ireland. Since then at least 55 UCC players have played for the full national team. 34 of these played for Ireland while still playing for UCC. Donal Lenihan was the last UCC player to be capped by Ireland while still attached to the club.

- Tom Ahearne
- Moss Finn
- Jerry Flannery
- Moss Keane
- John Kelly
- Tom Kiernan
- Paddy McGrath
- Denis Leamy
- Donal Lenihan
- Mick O'Driscoll
- Ben Mitchell
- Ronan O'Gara
- Darragh O'Mahony
- Patrick Parfrey
- William Roche
- Mike Ross
- Donnacha Ryan
- Frankie Sheahan
- Brian Spillane
- Peter Stringer
- Paul Wallace
- Jerry Walsh

=== British & Irish Lions ===
As well as representing Ireland, at least nine UCC players also went on to represent the British & Irish Lions. At least two of these players, Mick Lane and Tom Kiernan, were still UCC players when they toured with the Lions.

- William Roche: 1924
- Mick Lane: 1950
- Tom Kiernan: 1962, 1968
- Jerry Walsh: 1966
- Moss Keane: 1977
- Donal Lenihan: 1983, 1989
- Paul Wallace: 1997
- Ronan O'Gara: 2001, 2005
