= UL Bohemians R.F.C. =

Irish rugby union club based in Limerick, Co.Limerick

ULB RFC
- Full name: UL Bohemian Rugby Football Club
- Union: (Ireland) IRFU
- Branch: Munster
- Nickname: UL Bohs/The Robins
- Founded: 1922 (amalgamated 1999)
- Location: Limerick
- Ground(s): UL4G; Thomond Park; Annacotty (Capacity: 500; 25,600 (15,100 seated); 1,000)
- President: Liam Walsh
- Director of Rugby: Andrew Lacey
- Coach: Simon Malone
- Captain: Darragh O’Gorman
- League: All-Ireland League, 2B
- 2024–25: 6th.
Team kit

Official website
- www.ulbohemian.com

UL Bohemian RFC is a rugby union club based in Limerick, playing in Division 2B of the All-Ireland League. It is affiliated with the University of Limerick. UL Bohemians are sponsored by UL Sport, Samurai Sports and HOMS Solicitors. The symbol of the club is the Red Robin.

Bohemians field four men's (1XV, 2XV, 3XV, U20s) and two women's senior teams along with youth and mini rugby teams from U6s to U19s, and play their home matches at Annacotty, the University's North Campus 4G pitches and Thomond Park.

== History ==
Bohemian RFC was founded in 1922 and had their first Transfield Cup success two years later and their first Munster Senior Cup success in 1927. In 1999, they amalgamated with the University of Limerick in 1999, although the University has its own separate colleges' competition teams.

== Academy ==
The UL Bohemian Rugby Academy was first established in 2000 and is based on the University of Limerick’s sporting campus. It avails of UL's world-class training facilities to provide a pathway for players to achieve their rugby goals, whether that is to play senior, provincial or international rugby.

The academy has a record for producing amasing talent. Tommy O'Donnell, JJ Hanrahan, Dave Kilcoyne and Dave Foley are all academy graduates currently playing at high level. Former Connacht player Keith Matthews is academy manager and Cathal Sheridan is academy sports psychologist.

== Notable players ==
- Tommy O'Donnell
- Jack O'Donoghue
- JJ Hanrahan
- Cathal Sheridan
- Dave Kilcoyne
- Dave Foley
- Sean Henry
- Barry Murphy
- Brian Spillane
