= Munster Junior Cup (rugby union) =

The Munster Junior Cup is a rugby union competition played in the province of Munster, Ireland. The competition was established in 1909 for junior clubs and the second teams of the senior clubs in Munster. The competition has traditionally been dominated by the second teams of senior clubs, with Bandon R.F.C. in 2017 the last junior club to win the cup. Cork Constitution hold the record for the most wins with 21.

== Top Winners ==
	Team	Winner	Winning Years
1	Cork Constitution	21	1949, 1951, 1956, 1957, 1958, 1973, 1982, 1983, 1986, 1987, 1988, 1992, 1994, 1995, 2003, 2005, 2008, 2012, 2018, 2025, 2026
2	Shannon	11	1914, 1920, 1924, 1925, 1939, 1940, 1954, 1961, 1962, 1996, 2015
2	UCC	11	1921, 1933, 1950, 1953, 1963, 1967, 1969, 1975, 1977, 1979, 2024
4	Garryowen	9	1910, 1955, 1970, 1976, 1978, 1993, 2007, 2013, 2023
4	Young Munster	9	1911, 1922, 1927, 1959, 1960, 1984, 1999, 2016, 2022
5	Thomond	7	1971, 1980, 1981, 1985, 1989, 1990, 1991
6	Highfield	5	1937, 1942, 1945, 1972, 2019
6	Nenagh Ormond	5	1931, 1935, 1948, 2000, 2004
7	Dolphin	4	1913, 1923, 1926, 1944
7	Richmond	4	1936, 1943, 1946, 1952
8	UL Bohemians	3	1932, 2009, 2010
9	Waterford City	2	1928, 1930
9	Abbeyfeale	2	1964, 1966
9	Waterpark	2	1938, 1974
9	Midleton	2	1997, 1998
10	Crescent College F.C.	1	1909
10	Limerick City Gaullies	1	1912
10	Presentation	1	1929
10	Tralee	1	1934
10	Clanwilliam	1	1947
10	Old Christians	1	1965
10	St. Mary's	1	1968
10	Clonakilty	1	2001
10	Kilfeacle & District	1	2002
10	Cobh Pirates	1	2006
10	Cashel	1	2011
10	Clonmel	1	2014
10	Bandon	1	2017

== Past winners ==
- 1909 Crescent College F.C.
- 1910 Garryowen
- 1911 Young Munster
- 1912 Limerick City Gaulies
- 1913 Dolphin
- 1914 Shannon
- 1915 Suspended
- 1916 Suspended
- 1917 Suspended
- 1918 Suspended
- 1919 Suspended

== 1920s ==
- 1920 Shannon
- 1921 UCC
- 1922 Young Munster
- 1923 Dolphin
- 1924 Shannon
- 1925 Shannon
- 1926 Dolphin
- 1927 Young Munster
- 1928 Waterford City
- 1929 Presentation

== 1930s ==
- 1930 Waterford City
- 1931 Nenagh Ormond
- 1932 Bohemians beat Cork Constitution
- 1933 UCC
- 1934 Tralee
- 1935 Nenagh Ormond beat Killorglin.
- 1936 Richmond beat Cork Constitution
- 1937 Highfield
- 1938 Waterpark Old Boys
- 1939 Shannon

== 1940s ==
- 1940 Shannon
- 1941 Castleisland/Waterpark
- 1942 Highfield
- 1943 Richmond
- 1944 Dolphin beat Presentation
- 1945 Highfield
- 1946 Richmond
- 1947 Clanwilliam
- 1948 Nenagh Ormond
- 1949 Cork Constitution

== 1950s ==
- 1950 UCC
- 1951 Cork Constitution beat Old Crescent
- 1952 Richmond beat Sunday's Well
- 1953 UCC
- 1954 Shannon beat Cashel
- 1955 Garryowen
- 1956 Cork Constitution beat Old Crescent
- 1957 Cork Constitution
- 1958 Cork Constitution
- 1959 Young Munster

== 1960s ==
- 1960 Young Munster
- 1961 Shannon beat Nenagh Ormond
- 1962 Shannon beat Nenagh Ormond
- 1963 UCC beat Young Munster
- 1964 Abbeyfeale beat Nenagh Ormond
- 1965 Old Christians beat Abbeyfeale
- 1966 Abbeyfeale beat Nenagh Ormond
- 1967 UCC beat Cashel
- 1968 St. Mary's beat Waterford City
- 1969 UCC beat Ennis RFC

== 1970s ==
- 1970 Garryowen
- 1971 Thomond beat Garryowen
- 1972 Highfield beat UCC
- 1973 Cork Constitution beat Bandon
- 1974 Waterpark
- 1975 UCC beat Tralee
- 1976 Garryowen beat Highfield
- 1977 UCC beat Cashel
- 1978 Garryowen - Midleton 17–15
- 1979 UCC beat Richmond

== 1980s ==
- 1980 Thomond beat UCC 15–9
- 1981 Thomond beat UCC 7–6
- 1982 Cork Constitution beat Shannon 43–7
- 1983 Cork Constitution beat Old Christians 9–6
- 1984 Young Munster beat Thomond 15–3
- 1985 Thomond beat Cork Constitution 18–9
- 1986 Cork Constitution beat Young Munster 9–6
- 1987 Cork Constitution beat Highfield 21–0
- 1988 Cork Constitution beat Garryowen 9–4
- 1989 Thomond beat St. Mary's 6–4

== 1990s ==
- 1990 Thomond beat Richmond 16–9
- 1991 Thomond beat Garryowen 19–15
- 1992 Cork Constitution beat Bandon 13–3
- 1993 Garryowen beat Shannon 16–11
- 1994 Cork Constitution beat Shannon 13–9
- 1995 Cork Constitution beat Shannon 17–3
- 1996 Shannon beat UCC 19–17
- 1997 Midleton beat Cork Constitution 8–3
- 1998 Midleton beat Cork Constitution 8–3
- 1999 Young Munster beat Kilfeacle 19–13

== 2000s ==
- 2000 Nenagh Ormond beat Kilfeacle
- 2001 Clonakilty beat Cobh Pirates
- 2002 Kilfeacle beat Crosshaven
- 2003 Cork Constitution beat Nenagh Ormond 23–13
- 2004 Nenagh Ormond beat Bruff
- 2005 Cork Constitution beat UCC 17–5
- 2006 Cobh Pirates beat Cork Constitution 6–5
- 2007 Garryowen beat UL Bohemians
- 2008 Cork Constitution defeated UCC 17–10
- 2009 UL Bohemians beat Garryowen 16–13

== 2010s ==
- 2010 UL Bohemians beat Young Munster 13–6
- 2011 Cashel beat Cork Constitution 23–20
- 2012 Cork Constitution beat Skibbereen 13–10
- 2013 Garryowen beat Cork Constitution 16–13
- 2014 Clonmel beat Clanwilliam 27–9
- 2015 Shannon beat Clonmel 33–19
- 2016 Young Munster beat Cork Constitution 22–13
- 2017 Bandon beat Young Munster 27–14
- 2018 Cork Constitution beat Richmond 21–15
- 2019 Highfield drew with Cork Constitution 23–23 (Highfield won on tries scored (3–1))

== 2020s ==
- 2022 Young Munster beat Thomond 35–24
- 2023 Garryowen beat Kilfeacle & Dist 16–12
- 2024 UCC beat Kilfeacle & Dist 31–9
- 2025 Cork Constitution beat Old Crescent 21–19
- 2026 Cork Constitution beat Nenagh Ormond 38–20

== See also ==
- Munster Junior League
