= 2026–27 All-Ireland League (rugby union) =

35th season of All-Ireland League

- Countries: Ireland
- Number of teams: 50
- Date: 26 September 2026 – 25 April 2027

Official website
- www.irishrugby.ie/energia-all-ireland-league/energia-mens-all-ireland-league

The 2026–27 All-Ireland League, known as the Energia All-Ireland League for sponsorship reasons, is the 35th season of Irish Rugby's top level domestic competition. The League began on 26 September 2026 and will finish with the League final at the Aviva Stadium, Dublin on 25 April 2027.

St Mary's College are the defending champions having won their 3rd title by defeating reigning champions Clontarf in the 2025–26 League Final.

Enniskillen make their debut in the League this season. They replace Belfast Harlequins who were relegated from the league on the last day of last season.

== Format ==
The League consists of 5 divisions of 10 teams each playing a double round-robin competition using the standard Rugby union bonus points system. At the completion of the league phase the top 4 teams in Division 1A qualify for the play-off semi-finals, with the two winners meeting in the final.

The 10th placed teams in Divisions 1A, 1B and 2A are relegated to Divisions 1B, 2A and 2B respectively while the winners of Divisions 1B, 2A and 2B are promoted up one division. Division 2B is divided into North and South sections with the winners of each section playing-off for the Division 2B title. The 9th placed team in Division 1A along with the 2nd to 4th placed teams in Division 1B enter a play-off competition with the winner playing in Division 1A the following season. This same play-off competition also applies to Division 1B/2A. The 9th place team in 2A along with the loser of the 2B Final and runners-up in 2BN and 2BS enter a play-off competition with the winner playing in Division 2A the following season.

The 10th placed teams in each section of Division 2B play-off and the loser is relegated from the league to their respective Provincial qualifying league and are replaced by the winner of the All-Ireland Provincial League Championship. The winner of the play-off plays the runner-up of the All-Ireland Provincial League Championship with the winner playing in Division 2B the following season.

=== All-Ireland Provincial League Championship ===
The All-Ireland Provincial League Championship is contested by the winners of the four provincial qualifying leagues in Connacht, Leinster, Munster and Ulster. They are drawn to play in two semi-finals with the winners meeting in the final, where the winner will play in Division 2B of the A.I.L. for the following season. The runner-up plays against the winner of the Division 2B relegation play-off and the winner of this play-off will also play in Division 2B of the A.I.L. the following season.

== Team changes ==
The following promotions and relegations occurred at the end of the 2025–26 season:

	Promoted	Relegated
Division 1A	—	Nenagh Ormond
Division 1B	Old Wesley	Queen's University
Division 2A	MU Barnhall	Banbridge, Old Crescent*
Division 2B	Galwegians, UL Bohemians*	—
Division 2C	—	Belfast Harlequins
A-I PLC	Enniskillen	—

* via play-offs

== Division 1A ==
Cork Constitution continue their ever presence in the League's top division, playing their 35th season in the league, while Old Wesley return to the top flight for the first time this century.

=== Teams ===
Team	Location	Stadium	Capacity
Ballynahinch	Ballynahinch	Ballymacarn Park	1,000
Clontarf	Dublin (Clontarf)	Castle Avenue	3,200
Cork Constitution	Cork (Ballintemple)	Temple Hill	1,000
Lansdowne	Dublin (Ballsbridge)	Aviva Stadium (Back Pitch)	1,000
Old Belvedere	Dublin (Ballsbridge)	Ollie Campbell Park	1,000
Old Wesley	Dublin (Donnybrook)	Donnybrook Stadium	7,000
St Mary's College	Dublin (Templeogue)	Templeville Road	4,000
Terenure College	Dublin (Terenure)	Lakelands Park	3,000
UCD	Dublin (Belfield)	UCD Bowl	3,000
Young Munster	Limerick (Rosbrien)	Tom Clifford Park	1,000

Location of teams in the 2026–27 All-Ireland League Division 1A
Location of Dublin teams in the 2026–27 All-Ireland League Division 1A

=== Table ===
Pos	Team	Pld	W	D	L	PF	PA	PD	TF	TA	TB	LB	Pts	Qualification
1	Old Belvedere	6	4	1	1	186	93	+93	26	13	4	0	22	Play-off semi-finals
2	Terenure College	6	4	1	1	162	114	+48	21	15	3	1	22	Play-off semi-finals
3	St Mary's College	6	4	0	2	152	130	+22	20	18	2	2	20	Play-off semi-finals
4	UCD	6	4	0	2	173	202	−29	21	31	3	0	19	Play-off semi-finals
5	Clontarf	6	3	0	3	197	142	+55	29	16	4	2	18	
6	Lansdowne	6	3	0	3	169	156	+13	23	20	4	2	18	
7	Old Wesley	6	2	0	4	158	171	−13	23	25	4	1	13	
8	Young Munster	6	2	0	4	122	175	−53	19	25	3	0	11	
9	Ballynahinch	6	2	0	4	121	197	−76	16	28	1	0	9	Division 1B Play-offs
10	Cork Constitution	6	1	0	5	102	162	−60	14	22	1	2	7	Relegation to Division 1B

Updated to match(es) played on 7 November 2026. Source: 2026–27 AIL Tables
Rules for classification: Tiebreakers for teams tied on points: 1) Difference between points for and against; 2) Number of matches won; 3) Number of matches drawn; 4) Most tries scored; 5) Most league points in matches involving tied teams.

=== Fixtures and results ===
Home \ Away	BNH	CTF	CON	LAN	OBV	OWS	STM	TER	UCD	YMS
Ballynahinch	—	27 Feb 2027	31–14	21–17	27 Mar 2027	5 Dec 2026	9 Jan 2027	30 Jan 2027	24–39	20 Mar 2027
Clontarf	39–21	—	5 Dec 2026	6 Feb 2027	6 Mar 2027	38–22	27 Mar 2027	9 Jan 2027	61–15	30 Jan 2027
Cork Constitution	6 Feb 2027	16 Jan 2027	—	28 Nov 2026	7–24	27 Mar 2027	25–24	10–27	6 Mar 2027	12 Dec 2026
Lansdowne	6 Mar 2027	37–21	30 Jan 2027	—	35–26	9 Jan 2027	18–19	5 Dec 2026	27 Mar 2027	27 Feb 2027
Old Belvedere	56–10	11–7	27 Feb 2027	20 Mar 2027	—	30 Jan 2027	5 Dec 2026	20–20	9 Jan 2027	3 Apr 2027
Old Wesley	16 Jan 2027	3 Apr 2027	36–33	12 Dec 2026	28 Nov 2026	—	17–26	20 Mar 2027	6 Feb 2027	26–7
St Mary's College	12 Dec 2026	36–31	20 Mar 2027	3 Apr 2027	16 Jan 2027	27 Feb 2027	—	12–17	28 Nov 2026	35–22
Terenure College	28 Nov 2026	12 Dec 2026	3 Apr 2027	16 Jan 2027	6 Feb 2027	34–26	6 Mar 2027	—	47–25	17–21
UCD	3 Apr 2027	20 Mar 2027	18–13	43–26	12 Dec 2026	33–31	30 Jan 2027	27 Feb 2027	—	16 Jan 2027
Young Munster	32–14	28 Nov 2026	9 Jan 2027	26–36	14–47	6 Mar 2027	6 Feb 2027	27 Mar 2027	5 Dec 2026	—

Updated to match(es) played on 7 November 2026. Source: 2026–27 AIL fixtures & results
Legend: Blue = home team win; Yellow = draw; Red = away team win.

== Division 1B ==
After just one season in 1A, Nenagh Ormond return to Division 1B. MU Barnhall play in the 2nd tier of the A.I.L. for the first time in their history.

=== Teams ===
-->

Team	Location	Stadium	Capacity
Blackrock College	Dublin (Blackrock)	Stradbrook Road	4,000
City of Armagh	Armagh	Palace Grounds	1,000
Dublin University	Dublin	College Park	200
Garryowen	Limerick (Dooradoyle)	Dooradoyle	1,500
Highfield	Cork (Bishopstown)	Woodleigh Park	4,000
Instonians	Belfast	Shawsbridge Sports Complex	1,000
MU Barnhall	Leixlip	Parsonstown	1,000
Naas	Naas	Forenaughts	3,000
Nenagh Ormond	Nenagh	New Ormond Park	1,000
UCC	Cork (Mardyke)	Mardyke Arena	5,000

Location of teams in the 2026–27 All-Ireland League Division 1B
Location of Dublin teams in the 2026–27 All-Ireland League Division 1B

=== Table ===
Pos	Team	Pld	W	D	L	PF	PA	PD	TF	TA	TB	LB	Pts	Qualification
1	Naas	6	4	0	2	222	127	+95	34	20	5	1	22	Promotion to Division 1A
2	Highfield	5	4	0	1	150	104	+46	22	16	3	0	19	Division 1B Play-offs
3	Nenagh Ormond	6	4	0	2	139	121	+18	20	16	2	1	19	Division 1B Play-offs
4	Blackrock College	6	4	0	2	159	163	−4	24	24	3	0	19	Division 1B Play-offs
5	Instonians	6	3	0	3	130	149	−19	19	21	3	1	16	
6	MU Barnhall	6	3	0	3	122	122	0	14	18	1	2	15	
7	City of Armagh	6	2	1	3	121	125	−4	19	17	2	2	14	
8	Dublin University	6	2	1	3	168	180	−12	25	26	3	1	14	
9	Garryowen	6	2	0	4	119	180	−61	14	23	0	1	9	Division 2A Play-offs
10	UCC	5	0	0	5	93	152	−59	14	23	1	2	3	Relegation to Division 2A

Updated to match(es) played on 7 November 2026. Source: 2026–27 AIL Tables
Rules for classification: Tiebreakers for teams tied on points: 1) Difference between points for and against; 2) Number of matches won; 3) Number of matches drawn; 4) Most tries scored; 5) Most league points in matches involving tied teams.

=== Fixtures and results ===
Home \ Away	BLK	ARM	DBU	GAR	HIF	INS	MUB	NAS	NOR	UCC
Blackrock College	—	19–17	9 Jan 2027	27 Feb 2027	31–40	5 Dec 2026	21–10	20 Mar 2027	30 Jan 2027	27 Mar 2027
City of Armagh	6 Mar 2027	—	21–21	20–7	30 Jan 2027	9 Jan 2027	27 Mar 2027	27 Feb 2027	5 Dec 2026	24–12
Dublin University	12 Dec 2026	3 Apr 2027	—	46–22	20 Mar 2027	27 Feb 2027	28 Nov 2026	21–45	29–7	16 Jan 2027
Garryowen	16–43	6 Feb 2027	27 Mar 2027	—	5 Dec 2026	25–20	24–28	30 Jan 2027	9 Jan 2027	6 Mar 2027
Highfield	6 Feb 2027	28 Nov 2026	57–29	16 Jan 2027	—	27 Mar 2027	6 Mar 2027	12 Dec 2026	12–22	19 Dec 2026
Instonians	16 Jan 2027	12 Dec 2026	28–22	3 Apr 2027	7–24	—	6 Feb 2027	32–27	20 Mar 2027	28 Nov 2026
MU Barnhall	3 Apr 2027	23–22	30 Jan 2027	20 Mar 2027	15–17	30–20	—	16 Jan 2027	27 Feb 2027	12 Dec 2026
Naas	54–14	43–17	6 Feb 2027	28 Nov 2026	9 Jan 2027	6 Mar 2027	5 Dec 2026	—	27 Mar 2027	36–12
Nenagh Ormond	28 Nov 2026	16 Jan 2027	6 Mar 2027	12 Dec 2026	3 Apr 2027	21–23	18–16	31–21	—	40–20
UCC	26–31	20 Mar 2027	5 Dec 2026	23–25	27 Feb 2027	30 Jan 2027	9 Jan 2027	3 Apr 2027	6 Feb 2027	—

Updated to match(es) played on 7 November 2026. Source: 2026–27 AIL fixtures & results
Legend: Blue = home team win; Yellow = draw; Red = away team win.

== Division 2A ==
After 3 seasons in 1B, Queen's are back in Division 2A. Galwegians play in Division 2A after an absence of 7 years while UL Bohemians return after 2.

=== Teams ===
Team	Location	Stadium	Capacity
Ballymena	Antrim	Eaton Park	1,000
Cashel	Cashel	Spafield	2,500
Dungannon	Dungannon	Stevenson Park	1,000
Galway Corinthians	Galway (Castlegar)	Corinthian Park	1,000
Galwegians	Galway (Renmore)	Crowley Park	2,000
Greystones	Greystones	Dr Hickey Park	1,000
Queen's University	Belfast	Dub Lane	1,000
Shannon	Limerick	Thomond Park	25,100
UL Bohemians	Limerick (UL)	UL4G	1,000
Wanderers	Dublin (Ballsbridge)	Merrion Road	1,000

Location of teams in the 2026–27 All-Ireland League Division 2A

=== Table ===
Pos	Team	Pld	W	D	L	PF	PA	PD	TF	TA	TB	LB	Pts	Qualification
1	Galway Corinthians	6	5	0	1	138	94	+44	19	13	3	0	23	Promotion to Division 1B
2	Wanderers	6	4	0	2	165	132	+33	23	19	5	2	23	Division 2A Play-offs
3	Ballymena	6	5	0	1	136	107	+29	16	16	2	1	23	Division 2A Play-offs
4	Cashel	6	4	0	2	169	148	+21	25	19	4	1	21	Division 2A Play-offs
5	Dungannon	6	4	0	2	119	86	+33	15	8	1	1	18	
6	Queen's University	6	2	0	4	146	158	−12	21	22	3	2	13	
7	UL Bohemians	6	2	0	4	142	168	−26	18	24	3	1	12	
8	Shannon	6	2	0	4	123	156	−33	16	21	3	1	12	
9	Greystones	6	1	0	5	119	148	−29	15	19	1	3	8	Division 2B Play-offs
10	Galwegians	6	1	0	5	82	142	−60	13	20	0	2	6	Relegation to Division 2B

Updated to match(es) played on 7 November 2026. Source: 2026–27 AIL Tables
Rules for classification: Tiebreakers for teams tied on points: 1) Difference between points for and against; 2) Number of matches won; 3) Number of matches drawn; 4) Most tries scored; 5) Most league points in matches involving tied teams.

=== Fixtures and results ===
Home \ Away	BMA	CAS	DUN	GYC	GLW	GRE	QUB	SHN	ULB	WAN
Ballymena	—	16 Jan 2027	6 Feb 2027	12 Dec 2026	6 Mar 2027	26–14	26–19	28 Nov 2026	27 Mar 2027	17–24
Cashel	5 Dec 2026	—	21–20	30 Jan 2027	33–12	9 Jan 2027	27 Mar 2027	6 Feb 2027	32–17	6 Mar 2027
Dungannon	10–19	27 Feb 2027	—	20 Mar 2027	17–5	30 Jan 2027	9 Jan 2027	14–9	5 Dec 2026	27 Mar 2027
Galway Corinthians	9 Jan 2027	28 Nov 2026	7–27	—	5 Dec 2026	27 Mar 2027	6 Feb 2027	24–3	6 Mar 2027	28–26
Galwegians	12–17	20 Mar 2027	3 Apr 2027	16 Jan 2027	—	27 Feb 2027	30 Jan 2027	19–25	12–35	12 Dec 2026
Greystones	3 Apr 2027	12 Dec 2026	28 Nov 2026	19–26	15–22	—	6 Mar 2027	16 Jan 2027	34–38	6 Feb 2027
Queen's University	20 Mar 2027	29–36	12 Dec 2026	19–34	28 Nov 2026	7–17	—	3 Apr 2027	27 Feb 2027	16 Jan 2027
Shannon	30 Jan 2027	41–35	6 Mar 2027	27 Feb 2027	27 Mar 2027	5 Dec 2026	21–32	—	9 Jan 2027	24–32
UL Bohemians	28–31	3 Apr 2027	16 Jan 2027	0–19	6 Feb 2027	20 Mar 2027	22–40	12 Dec 2026	—	28 Nov 2026
Wanderers	27 Feb 2027	29–10	25–31	3 Apr 2027	9 Jan 2027	29–20	5 Dec 2026	20 Mar 2027	30 Jan 2027	—

Updated to match(es) played on 7 November 2026. Source: 2026–27 AIL fixtures & results
Legend: Blue = home team win; Yellow = draw; Red = away team win.

== Division 2B (North) ==
Banbridge drop down from Division 2A and play in the newly formed Division 2BN along with league debutants Enniskillen.

=== Teams ===
Team	Location	Stadium	Capacity
Ballyclare	Ballyclare	The Cloughan	1,000
Banbridge	Banbridge	Rifle Park	1,000
Clogher Valley	Fivemiletown	The Cran	1,000
Enniskillen	Enniskillen	Ardgart	1,000
Malahide	Malahide	Estuary Road	1,000
Malone	Belfast	Gibson Park	1,000
Navan	Navan	Balreask Old	4,000
Rainey	Magherafelt	Hatrick Park	1,000
Skerries	Skerries	Holmpatrick	1,000
Sligo	Strandhill	Hamilton Park	1,000

Location of teams in the 2026–27 All-Ireland League Division 2BN

=== Table ===
Pos	Team	Pld	W	D	L	PF	PA	PD	TF	TA	TB	LB	Pts	Qualification
1	Clogher Valley	6	5	0	1	179	116	+63	27	19	5	1	26	Division 2B Final
2	Malone	6	5	0	1	174	128	+46	26	18	5	1	26	Division 2B Play-offs
3	Ballyclare	6	4	0	2	186	148	+38	28	22	4	1	21	
4	Enniskillen	6	4	0	2	167	132	+35	24	20	4	1	21	
5	Banbridge	6	3	0	3	189	146	+43	29	20	5	3	20	
6	Skerries	6	2	0	4	158	164	−6	25	26	3	2	13	
7	Sligo	6	2	0	4	114	170	−56	17	24	2	1	11	
8	Malahide	6	2	0	4	161	205	−44	21	30	1	1	10	
9	Navan	6	2	0	4	108	168	−60	16	25	1	1	10	
10	Rainey	6	1	0	5	110	169	−59	14	23	2	2	8	Division 2B Relegation Play-off

Updated to match(es) played on 7 November 2026. Source: 2026–27 AIL Tables
Rules for classification: Tiebreakers for teams tied on points: 1) Difference between points for and against; 2) Number of matches won; 3) Number of matches drawn; 4) Most tries scored; 5) Most league points in matches involving tied teams.

=== Fixtures and results ===
Home \ Away	BCL	BAN	CLV	ENK	MLD	MLN	NAV	RAI	SKR	SLG
Ballyclare	—	17–39	28 Nov 2026	16 Jan 2027	62–41	12 Dec 2026	6 Mar 2027	27 Mar 2027	6 Feb 2075	32–26
Banbridge	27 Feb 2027	—	20 Mar 2027	18–17	5 Dec 2026	3 Apr 2027	9 Jan 2027	30 Jan 2027	26–31	55–27
Clogher Valley	30 Jan 2027	25–24	—	26–7	38–15	27 Feb 2027	27 Mar 2027	9 Jan 2027	6 Mar 2027	5 Dec 2026
Enniskillen	5 Dec 2026	6 Mar 2027	6 Feb 2027	—	27 Mar 2027	30 Jan 2027	50–19	33–29	29–21	9 Jan 2027
Malahide	20 Mar 2027	16 Jan 2027	3 Apr 2027	19–31	—	30–28	28 Nov 2026	27 Feb 2027	12 Dec 2026	23–10
Malone	9 Jan 2027	29–27	34–28	28 Nov 2026	6 Feb 2027	—	5 Dec 2026	6 Mar 2027	32–26	27 Mar 2027
Navan	13–8	12 Dec 2026	17–38	20 Mar 2027	30 Jan 2027	16 Jan 2027	—	23–13	3 Apr 2027	27 Feb 2027
Rainey	12–36	28 Nov 2026	12 Dec 2026	3 Apr 2027	36–33	10–15	6 Feb 2027	—	16 Jan 2027	20 Mar 2027
Skerries	17–31	27 Mar 2027	19–24	27 Feb 2027	9 Jan 2027	20 Mar 2027	44–22	5 Dec 2026	—	30 Jan 2027
Sligo	3 Apr 2027	6 Feb 2027	16 Jan 2027	12 Dec 2026	6 Mar 2027	7–36	15–14	29–10	28 Nov 2026	—

Updated to match(es) played on 7 November 2026. Source: 2026–27 AIL fixtures & results
Legend: Blue = home team win; Yellow = draw; Red = away team win.

== Division 2B (South) ==
Old Crescent who lost their play-off match to Sligo last season drop down to the newly formed Division 2BS.

=== Teams ===
Team	Location	Stadium	Capacity
Bective Rangers	Dublin (Donnybrook)	Donnybrook Stadium	6,000
Bruff	Bruff	Kilballyowen Park	2,000
Buccaneers	Athlone	Dubarry Park	10,000
Clonmel	Clonmel	Ard Gaoithe	4,000
Dolphin	Cork (Ballyphehane)	Musgrave Park	8,008
Enniscorthy	Enniscorthy	Ross Road	1,000
Midleton	Midleton	Towns Park	400
Monkstown	Dublin (Sandymount)	Sydney Parade	1,000
Old Crescent	Limerick (Rosbrien)	Rosbrien	4,000
Thomond	Limerick (Moyross)	Liam Fitzgerald Park	1,000

Location of teams in the 2026–27 All-Ireland League Division 2BS
Location of Dublin teams in the 2026–27 All-Ireland League Division 2BS

=== Table ===
Pos	Team	Pld	W	D	L	PF	PA	PD	TF	TA	TB	LB	Pts	Qualification
1	Clonmel	6	6	0	0	179	90	+89	25	11	4	0	28	Division 2B Final
2	Bective Rangers	6	5	0	1	235	83	+152	34	13	4	1	25	Division 2B Play-offs
3	Midleton	6	5	0	1	253	39	+214	36	6	4	0	24	
4	Old Crescent	6	5	0	1	186	116	+70	27	13	4	0	24	
5	Bruff	6	3	0	3	125	153	−28	16	22	2	1	15	
6	Buccaneers	6	3	0	3	93	210	−117	13	32	2	0	14	
7	Monkstown	6	1	0	5	135	209	−74	19	29	4	2	10	
8	Thomond	6	1	0	5	127	133	−6	17	16	1	2	7	
9	Dolphin	6	1	0	5	107	217	−110	14	32	1	1	6	
10	Enniscorthy	6	0	0	6	56	246	−190	8	35	0	1	1	Division 2B Relegation Play-off

Updated to match(es) played on 7 November 2026. Source: 2026–27 AIL Tables
Rules for classification: Tiebreakers for teams tied on points: 1) Difference between points for and against; 2) Number of matches won; 3) Number of matches drawn; 4) Most tries scored; 5) Most league points in matches involving tied teams.

=== Fixtures and results ===
Home \ Away	BEC	BRF	BUC	CML	DOL	ENC	MID	MNK	OCR	THO
Bective Rangers	—	27 Mar 2027	6 Mar 2027	9 Jan 2027	30 Jan 2027	5 Dec 2026	15–7	42–14	33–36	27 Feb 2027
Bruff	7–57	—	3 Apr 2027	19–20	19–15	27 Feb 2027	12 Dec 2026	20 Mar 2027	30 Jan 2027	16 Jan 2027
Buccaneers	7–59	5–33	—	5 Dec 2026	27–12	30 Jan 2027	27 Mar 2027	27 Feb 2027	9 Jan 2027	20 Mar 2027
Clonmel	12 Dec 2026	6 Feb 2027	16 Jan 2027	—	43–21	20 Mar 2027	28 Nov 2026	3 Apr 2027	16–5	27–10
Dolphin	28 Nov 2026	6 Mar 2027	6 Feb 2027	27 Mar 2027	—	37–12	0–62	16 Jan 2027	22–54	12 Dec 2026
Enniscorthy	16 Jan 2027	25–31	28 Nov 2026	7–40	3 Apr 2027	—	6 Feb 2027	12 Dec 2026	6 Mar 2027	7–55
Midleton	20 Mar 2027	9 Jan 2027	58–0	30 Jan 2027	27 Feb 2027	57–5	—	46–7	5 Dec 2026	3 Apr 2027
Monkstown	6 Feb 2027	31–16	24–28	28–33	5 Dec 2026	9 Jan 2027	6 Mar 2027	—	27 Mar 2027	30 Jan 2027
Old Crescent	3 Apr 2027	28 Nov 2026	12 Dec 2026	27 Feb 2027	20 Mar 2027	26–0	16 Jan 2027	44–31	—	21–14
Thomond	12–29	5 Dec 2026	24–26	6 Mar 2027	9 Jan 2027	27 Mar 2027	12–23	28 Nov 2026	6 Feb 2027	—

Updated to match(es) played on 7 November 2026. Source: 2026–27 AIL fixtures & results
Legend: Blue = home team win; Yellow = draw; Red = away team win.

== Play-offs ==
=== Division 1A Play-offs ===
Semi-finals

17 April 2027
Semi-final 1

1st Division 1A	v	4th Division 1A

17 April 2027
Semi-final 2

2nd Division 1A	v	3rd Division 1A

All-Ireland League Final
See below.

=== Division 1B Play-offs ===
Semi-finals

17 April 2027
Semi-final 1

9th Division 1A	v	4th Division 1B

17 April 2027
Semi-final 2

2nd Division 1B	v	3rd Division 1B

Play-off Final

24 April 2027
Play-off Final

Winner Semi-final 1	v	Winner Semi-final 2

=== Division 2A Play-offs ===
Semi-finals

17 April 2027
Semi-final 1

9th Division 1B	v	4th Division 2A

17 April 2027
Semi-final 2

2nd Division 2A	v	3rd Division 2A

Play-off Final

24 April 2027
Play-off Final

Winner Semi-final 1	v	Winner Semi-final 2

=== Division 2B Play-offs ===
Division 2B Final

17 April 2027
Final

1st Division 2BN	v	1st Division 2BS

Semi-finals

24 April 2027
Semi-final 1

9th Division 2A	v	2nd Division 2BN or 2BS

24 April 2027
Semi-final 2

Loser of Division 2B Final	v	2nd Division 2BN or 2BS

Play-off Final

1 May 2027
Play-off Final

Winner Semi-final 1	v	Winner Semi-final 2

Relegation Play-off

17 April 2027
Relegation Play-off

10th Division 2BN	v	10th Division 2BS

=== Provincial League Championship ===
Semi-finals

3 April 2027
Semi-final 1

Provincial League Winner (Connacht)	v	Provincial League Winner ( Munster)

3 April 2027
Semi-final 2

Provincial League Winner (Leinster)	v	Provincial League Winner ( Ulster)

Final

10 April 2027
Final

Winner Semi-final 1	v	Winner Semi-final 2

Play-off

24 April 2027
Play-off

Winner of Division 2B; Relegation play-off	v	Loser of Provincial League Final

== Final ==
The All-Ireland League Final is scheduled to take place on Sunday, 25 April 2027 at the Aviva Stadium, Dublin.

All-Ireland League Final

25 April 2027
Final

Winner of Division 1A Semi-final 1	v	Winner of Division 1A Semi-final 2

Aviva Stadium

== See also ==
- Bateman Cup
- Connacht Senior League
- Leinster Senior League
- Munster Senior League
- Ulster Senior League
