= Ken Armstrong (rugby union) =

Rugby union player from Northern Ireland

- Full name: William Kenneth Armstrong
- Born: 22 October 1931 Belfast, Northern Ireland
- Died: 1 June 2017 (aged 85) Craigavon, Northern Ireland
- School: Grosvenor High School

Rugby union career
- Position(s): Fly-half, centre
Amateur team(s)
Years	Team	Apps	(Points)
- North of Ireland
-1968	Dungannon		
Provincial / State sides
Years	Team	Apps	(Points)
1959-63	Ulster	13	
International career
Years	Team	Apps	(Points)
1960–61	Ireland	2	(0)
Coaching career
- Years: Team
- 1969-72: Ulster

William Kenneth Armstrong (22 October 1931 — 1 June 2017) was an Irish international rugby union player.

Born in Belfast, Armstrong was educated at Grosvenor High School. He showed promise as a soccer centre-half and was signed by Leicester City, but his time there was brief and he started playing rugby for North of Ireland on his return to Belfast. He was selected for Ulster thirteen times at fly-half and centre between 1959 and 1963, and was capped twice as a fly-half for Ireland, against the Springboks in 1960 and England the following year. He retired from playing at the end of the 1967-68 season, after leading Dungannon to an Ulster Senior League-Senior Cup double. He also represented Ulster in basketball.

He was appointed the first coach of the Ulster provincial rugby team in 1969, working alongside the existing selection committee. Ulster only lost one game in the IRFU Interprovincial Championship in the three years he coached them. He retired from the position in 1972, succeeded by Maurice Crabbe.

Armstrong taught at the Royal School Dungannon for 28 years and served as head of PE, before retiring in 1982.

== See also ==
- List of Ireland national rugby union players
