= Ulster Senior League (rugby union) =

The Ulster Senior League, currently known as the Ulster Rugby Premiership, is a rugby union competition for senior clubs in the Irish province of Ulster. It was formed by the then Northern Branch of the Irish Rugby Football Union in October 1890. It has traditionally being ranked second in importance to the Ulster Senior Cup. It has declined in importance due to the formation of the All-Ireland League and growth in importance of the Heineken Cup.

The Senior League has had a chequered history. Its value was marred in the amateur era by periods when the elite clubs like North, Instonians and Collegians withdrew from the league to allow them to fulfil more friendly fixtures - particularly against English and Welsh opposition. This attitude from some of the senior clubs even lead to the scrapping of the league in 1930, and it was not re-established until after World War II. The practice of withdrawing from the league finally died out in the 1970s.

Mostly the league was played in one section on an all-play-all home and away basis. However, with the expansion of the number of Senior Clubs in 1980, two sections were formed and the top two teams qualified for semi-finals. This allowed for a showpiece final at the end of the season.

The two section arrangement continued until 1990 when the advent of professionalism and preparation for the All-Ireland League, saw the league separated into two sections based on playing ability. Promotion and relegation between the two sections was introduced at this time. This later gave way to a single-division league.

For the 2015-16 season, the Ulster Senior League was revamped as the Ulster Championship League. To avoid the fixture congestion caused by playing in two competitions, Ulster's ten All-Ireland League clubs were divided into two sections, based on last season's league standings - Ballynahinch, Armagh, Ballymena, City of Derry and Malone in Section 1, and Queen's University, Belfast Harlequins, Rainey Old Boys, Banbridge and Dungannon in Section 2 - with each team playing just four matches. For the 2016-17 season it was revamped again as the SONI Ulster Rugby Premiership, sponsored by System Operator for Northern Ireland.

The winners receive the Stevenson Shield.

== Membership 2024-25 ==
=== Division 1 ===
- Ballynahinch
- Banbridge
- City of Armagh
- Dungannon
- Instonians
- Malone
- Queen's University
- Rainey

=== Division 2 ===
- Ballyclare
- Ballymena
- Belfast Harlequins
- Clogher Valley
- Omagh Academicals

== Winners ==
=== 1890s ===
- 1890/91 Queen's College Belfast
- 1891/92 NIFC
- 1892/93 NIFC
- 1893/94 NIFC
- 1894/95 NIFC
- 1895/96 NIFC
- 1896/97 NIFC
- 1897/98 NIFC
- 1898/99 NIFC

=== 1900s ===
- 1899/1900 Queen's College Belfast
- 1900/01 NIFC
- 1901/02 NIFC
- 1902/03 Collegians
- 1903/04 Malone
- 1904/05 Malone
- 1905/06 Malone
- 1906/07 Malone
- 1907/08 Collegians
- 1908/09 NIFC

=== 1910s ===
- 1909/10
- 1910/11 Collegians
- 1911/12 Queen's University
- 1912/13 Collegians
- 1913/14 Season abandoned due political crisis caused by the Home Rule Crisis.
- 1914/15-1918/19 Not played due to World War I

=== 1920s ===
- 1919/20 Queen's University
- 1920/21 NIFC
- 1921/22 Queen's University
- 1922/23 Queen's University
- 1923/24 Queen's University
- 1924/25 Instonians
- 1925/26 Instonians
- 1926/27 Instonians/NIFC
- 1927/28 Instonians
- 1928/29 Civil Service

=== 1930s ===
- 1929/30 Bangor
- 1930/31-1944/45 Not played

=== 1940s ===
- 1945/46 NIFC
- 1946/47 Queen's University
- 1947/48 Queen's University
- 1948/49 Queen's University

=== 1950s ===
- 1949/50 Queen's University
- 1950/51 Collegians/Instonians
- 1951/52 Collegians
- 1952/53 Instonians/Queen's University
- 1953/54 Instonians/Queen's University
- 1954/55 NIFC
- 1955/56 Collegians
- 1956/57 Instonians/Queen's University
- 1957/58 Instonians
- 1958/59 NIFC

=== 1960s ===
- 1959/60 Instonians
- 1960/61 Dungannon
- 1961/62 Collegians
- 1962/63 C.I.Y.M.S.
- 1963/64 Queen's University
- 1964/65 Dungannon
- 1965/66 NIFC
- 1966/67 Queen's University
- 1967/68 Dungannon
- 1968/69 Malone

=== 1970s ===
- 1969/70 Civil Service
- 1970/71 C.I.Y.M.S.
- 1971/72 C.I.Y.M.S.
- 1972/73 Ballymena/C.I.Y.M.S.
- 1973/74 C.I.Y.M.S.
- 1974/75 Bangor
- 1975/76 Ballymena
- 1976/77 Bangor
- 1977/78 Ballymena
- 1978/79 Ballymena

=== 1980s ===
- 1979/80 Queen's University
- 1980/81 Bangor
- 1981/82 Bangor
- 1982/83 Bangor
- 1983/84 Ards
- 1984/85 Instonians
- 1985/86 Ballymena
- 1986/87 Instonians
- 1987/88 Bangor
- 1988/89 Ballymena

=== 1990s ===
- 1989/90 Ballymena
- 1990/91 Dungannon
- 1991/92 NIFC
- 1992/93 Malone
- 1993/94
- 1994/95
- 1995/96 Portadown
- 1996/97 Ballymena
- 1997/98 Ballymena
- 1998/99

=== 2000s ===
- 1999/2000 City of Derry
- 2000/01 Ballymena
- 2001/02 Ballymena
- 2002/03 Belfast Harlequins
- 2003/04 Belfast Harlequins
- 2004/05 Ballymena/Belfast Harlequins
- 2005/06 Ballymena/Dungannon
- 2006/07 Belfast Harlequins
- 2007/08 Belfast Harlequins
- 2008/09 Ballynahinch

=== 2010s ===
- 2009/10
- 2010/11
- 2011/12
- 2012/13 Ballynahinch
- 2013-14 Ballynahinch
- 2014-15 Ballynahinch
- 2015-16 Ballymena
- 2016-17 Armagh
- 2017-18 Armagh
- 2018-19 Ballynahinch

=== 2020s ===
- 2019/20 Rainey Old Boys
- 2020/21 Not played due to COVID-19 pandemic
- 2021/22 Ballynahinch
- 2022/23 Ballynahinch
- 2023/24 Ballynahinch
- 2024/25 Armagh

== See also ==
- Connacht Senior League
- Leinster Senior League
- Munster Senior League
