= Robert Baloucoune =

Irish rugby union player

- Born: 19 August 1997 (age 29) Enniskillen, Northern Ireland
- Height: 1.92 m (6 ft 3 1/2 in)
- Weight: 104 kg (16.4 st; 229 lb)
- School: Portora Royal School

Rugby union career
- Position(s): Wing, Fullback
Amateur team(s)
Years	Team	Apps	(Points)
2016	Enniskillen RFC		
Senior career
Years	Team	Apps	(Points)
2018–	Ulster	82	(185)
- Correct as of 17 October 2026
International career
Years	Team	Apps	(Points)
2021–	Ireland	12	(45)
2022	Emerging Ireland	2	(5)
2025-	Ireland A	1	(10)
- Correct as of 21 November 2026
National sevens team
Years	Team		Comps
2018	Ireland 7s		6

Robert Baloucoune (born 19 August 1997) is an Irish rugby union player who plays on the wing for United Rugby Championship and European Champions Cup side Ulster, and internationally for Ireland.

== Early career ==
Baloucoune was born in Enniskillen, Fermanagh; his father is from Senegal. Baloucoune attended Portora Royal School (later Enniskillen Royal Grammar School) and represented Enniskillen in the Ulster Towns Cup, being part of the team that lost the 2017 final to Ballynahinch 2nds.

He was selected by Ireland 7s for the 2018 Rugby World Cup Sevens, where they won the Challenge Trophy by beating Australia 24–14 and finished ninth overall. He was also part of the squad that won the 2018 Europe Sevens Grand Prix Series, Ireland's first Europe Grand Prix title. His performances for Ireland resulted in him earning a place in Ulster's academy part-way through the 2017–18 season.

== Senior career ==
He made his senior debut for Ulster in their 36–18 win against Welsh side Dragons on 26 October 2018, in round 7 of the Pro14. He made his Champions Cup debut in round 5 of the 2018–19 tournament, starting against French side Racing 92 and scoring a try in Ulster's 26–22 win on 12 January 2019. He made 14 appearances and scored six tries in the 2018–19 season, and signed a development contract ahead of the 2019–20 season.

He sustained a hamstring avulsion injury in training in August 2020, which kept him out until February 2021. In the meantime, he signed a two-year contract extension in January 2021. In the 2021–22 season he made 13 appearances for Ulster and scored nine tries, including a hat-trick against Toulouse in the Champions Cup, and was nominated for Ulster's men's player of the year award.

== International career ==
He was called up as a development player by Andy Farrell, training with the Ireland squad before the 2020 Six Nations Championship.

In June 2021, he was called up to the senior Ireland squad for the Summer tests. He made his debut against the United States on 10 July 2021, playing 80 minutes and scoring a try in the 17th minute.

He was unavailable for 2022 Ireland rugby union tour of New Zealand with injury, but was selected for the Emerging Ireland squad for the Toyota Challenge in South Africa in September 2022.

On 14 February 2026, Baloucoune played his first Six Nations game in a 20–13 victory against Italy. He scored a try after Italy lead 10–5 at half-time, winning the Player of the Match award. He started four matches and scored three tries in total, receiving the BKT Rising Player award for the tournament. His try against Italy was named Men's 15s Try of the Year at the 2026 Rugby Players Ireland awards.
