= Ulster Junior Cup (rugby union) =

The Ulster Junior Cup is a rugby union competition for clubs in the Irish province of Ulster that are not considered strong enough to play in the Ulster Senior Cup. It also includes the second teams of the senior clubs. The perpetual trophy that is awarded to the winners is called The Balmoral Cup

The most successful club is Queen's University with 15 wins. The current holder is Ballyclare

== Performance by Club ==
Club	Winners	Runners-Up	Total Finals	Last Title
Queen's University RFC	15	8	23	1969–70
Dungannon	9	8	17	2002–03
North of Ireland Football Club	9	8	17	1984–85
Ballynahinch	9	3	12	2017–18
City of Armagh	8	7	15	2009–10
Ballymena	8	2	10	2004–05
Collegians	7	6	13	1961–62
Donaghadee	7	2	9	2011–12
Malone	5	4	9	1980–81
Omagh	4	7	11	2016–17
Instonians	5	3	9	2014–15
Coleraine	3	6	9	1985–86
City of Derry	3	2	5	2008–09
Larne	3	0	3	1922–23
King's Scholars	2	4	6	1970–71
Lurgan	2	3	5	1955–56
Cooke	2	2	4	2006–07
Ballyclare	3	2	5	2022–23
Dromore	3	2	5	2023–24
Rainey Old Boys	2	1	3	1978–79
Ards	1	4	5	1976–77
Banbridge	1	4	5	1989–90
C.I.Y.M.S.	1	3	4	1952–53
Clogher Valley	2	3	5	2021–22
Carrickfergus	1	2	3	1913–14
Knock	1	2	3	1910–11
Sydenham	1	2	3	1904–05
Albion	1	1	2	1890–91
Fortwilliam	1	1	2	1903–04
Holywood	1	1	2	1990–91
Windsor	1	1	2	1892–93
Belfast Harlequins	1	0	1	2003–04
Bangor	1	7	8	2015–16
BRA FP	0	2	2	-
Enniskillen	2	5	7	2025-26
Portadown	0	2	2	-
RUC	0	2	2	-
Belmont	0	1	1	-
Civil Service	0	1	1	-
Limavady	0	1	1	-
Queen's Island	0	1	1	-

== Finals ==
=== 1880s and 90s ===
Year	Winner			Runner-up	Notes
1888–89	Queen's College II	15	0	Bangor	
1889–90	Queen's College II	6	0	Albion II	
1890–91	Albion II	6	0	Collegians	
1891–92	Collegians	5	0	Windsor	
1892–93	Windsor	3	0	Collegians	
1893–94	Collegians II	13	0	City of Derry	
1894–95	NIFC II	5	0	Collegians II	
1895–96	Dungannon	6	3	NIFC II	
1896–97	Dungannon II	23	0	Belmont	
1897–98	City of Derry	11	0	Holywood	
1898–99	Dungannon	8	0	NIFC II	

=== 1900s ===
Year	Winner			Runner-up	Notes
1899–1900	Dungannon II	6	0	Collegians II	Replay – Game 1: 0–0)
1900–01	Collegians II	19	0	Fortwilliam II	
1901–02	Collegians II	3	0	NIFC II	
1902–03	Collegians II	3	0	Queen's College II	
1903–04	Fortwilliam	5	3	Collegians II	
1904–05	Sydenham	9	3	Bangor	
1905–06	Donaghadee	13	5	Malone II	
1906–07	NIFC II	8	0	Queen's College II	
1907–08	NIFC II	22	3	Queen's University II	
1908–09	NIFC II	13	3	Sydenham	

=== 1910s ===
Year	Winner			Runner-up	Notes
1909–10	Armagh	8	0	Knock II	
1910–11	Knock II	5	4	Bangor	
1911–12	Dungannon	13	6	Sydenham	
1912–13	Armagh	8	0	Knock II	
1913–14	Carrickfergus	w/o	-	Dungannon	Replay awarded to Carrickfergus when Dungannon withdrew – Game 1: 3–3
1914–15	Not played due to World War I				
1915–16	Not played due to World War I				
1916–17	Not played due to World War I				
1917–18	Not played due to World War I				
1918–19	Not played due to World War I				

=== 1920s ===
Year	Winner			Runner-up	Notes
1919–20	Larne	3	0	Armagh	
1920–21	Queen's University II	9	0	Lurgan	
1921–22	Larne	5	3	Cooke	
1922–23	Larne	23	0	Bangor	
1923–24	Donaghadee	10	3	NIFC II	
1924–25	Lurgan	8	0	Donaghadee	after extra time
1925–26	Donaghadee	4	3	Dungannon	
1926–27	Donaghadee	3	0	NIFC II	after extra time
1927–28	Donaghadee	5	0	Queen's University II	
1928–29	Ballymena	3	0	Instonians II	

=== 1930s ===
Year	Winner			Runner-up	Notes
1929–30	Ballymena	3	0	Enniskillen	after extra time)
1930–31	Armagh	4	3	Instonians II	
1931–32	Malone II	3	0	Queen's Island	
1932–33	Queen's University II	6	4	Armagh	
1933–34	Queen's University II	24	0	Portadown	
1934–35	Coleraine	18	6	Queen's University II	
1935–36	NIFC II	5	3	Queen's University II	
1936–37	Instonians II	3	0	C.I.Y.M.S.	after extra time
1937–38	Queen's University II	6	0	Collegians II	
1938–39	Dromore	3	0	Coleraine	

=== 1940s ===
Year	Winner			Runner-up	Notes
1939–40	Not played due to World War II				
1940–41	Not played due to World War II				
1941–42	Not played due to World War II				
1942–43	Not played due to World War II				
1943–44	Not played due to World War II				
1944–45	Not played due to World War II				
1945–46	City of Derry	5	0	C.I.Y.M.S.	
1946–47	Queen's University II	16	3	Carrickfergus	
1947–48	Queen's University II	13	6	King's Scholars	
1948–49	Queen's University II	9	8	Dungannon	after extra time

=== 1950s ===
Year	Winner			Runner-up	Notes
1949–50	Coleraine	11	8	Queen's University II	
1950–51	Queens University II	8	6	Instonians II	
1951–52	Queens University II	14	3	NIFC II	
1952–53	C.I.Y.M.S. II	12	0	King's Scholars	
1953–54	NIFC II	3	0	Lurgan	
1954–55	King's Scholars	14	0	BRA FP	
1955–56	Lurgan	8	3	Ballyclare	
1956–57	NIFC II	9	3	Portadown	
1957–58	Donaghadee	5	3	BRA FP	
1958–59	Queens University II	3	0	Malone II	

=== 1960s ===
Year	Winner			Runner-up	Notes
1959–60	Instonians II	17	3	RUC	
1960–61	Collegians II	8	6	Ballymena II	
1961–62	Collegians II	6	0	NIFC II	
1962–63	NIFC II	6	0	Lurgan	
1963–64	Queen's Freshers	3	0	Omagh	
1964–65	Armagh	3	0	Dungannon II	
1965–66	Ballynahinch	5	3	Dungannon II	
1966–67	Ballynahinch	15	0	King's Scholars	
1967–68	Malone II	3	0	Civil Service II	
1968–69	Queens University II	6	5	Bangor	

=== 1970s ===
Year	Winner			Runner-up	Notes
1969–70	Queen's University II	3	0	King's Scholars	
1970–71	King's Scholars	11	3	Queen's University II	
1971–72	Ballymena II	15	0	CIYMS II	
1972–73	Ballymena II	20	12	Ards	
1973–74	Instonians II	10	9	Ards	
1974–75	Malone II	10	0	Coleraine	
1975–76	Rainey Old Boys	9	0	NIFC II	
1976–77	Ards	7	0	Malone II	
1977–78	Malone II	9	6	Ards II	
1978–79	Rainey Old Boys	10	6	Malone II	

=== 1980s ===
Year	Winner			Runner-up	Notes
1979–80	Armagh	17	3	Coleraine	
1980–81	Malone II	15	9	Coleraine	
1981–82	Omagh	22	9	Bangor II	
1982–83	Omagh	6	4	Coleraine	
1983–84	Omagh	3	0	Banbridge	
1984–85	NIFC II	9	6	Omagh	
1985–86	Coleraine	6	3	Rainey Old Boys	
1986–87	Cooke	15	12	Enniskillen	
1987–88	Ballynahinch	9	3	Ards II	
1988–89	Ballyclare	18	12	Omagh	

=== 1990s ===
Year	Winner			Runner-up	Notes
1989–90	Banbridge	10	7	RUC	.
1990–91	Holywood	19	9	Omagh	
1991–92	Ballynahinch	13	12	Ballymena II	
1992–93	Omagh	17	6	Donaghadee	
1993–94	Instonians II	17	3	Bangor II	
1994–95	Ballynahinch	14	8	Banbridge	
1995–96	Dungannon II	8	6	Banbridge	
1996–97	Dungannon II	37	12	Omagh	
1997–98	Ballymena II	13	0	Banbridge	
1998–99	Dungannon II	38	8	Armagh	

=== 2000s ===
Year	Winner			Runner-up	Notes
1999–2000	Ballymena II	60	8	Armagh	
2000–01	Ballymena II	24	22	Dungannon II	
2001–02	Ballyclare	31	10	Carrick	
2002–03	Dungannon II	24	5	Clogher Valley	
2003–04	Belfast Harlequins II	27	14	Dungannon II	
2004–05	Ballymena II	33	18	Dromore	
2005–06	Armagh	17	15	Dungannon II	
2006–07	Cooke	20	3	Clogher Valley	
2007–08	Armagh	19	12	Clogher Valley	
2008–09	City of Derry	36	13	Cooke	

=== 2010s ===
Year	Winner			Runner-up	Notes
2009–10	Armagh	12	3	Limavady	
2010–11	Ballynahinch II	22	10	Armagh	
2011–12	Donaghadee	10	0	Coleraine	
2012–13	Clogher Valley	22	21	Ballynahinch II	
2013–14	Ballynahinch II	17	7	Ballyclare	
2014–15	Instonians	14	0	Omagh	
2015–16	Bangor	7	5	Instonians	
2016–17	Ballynahinch II	17	3	Omagh	
2017–18	Ballynahinch II	23	8	Armagh II	
2018–19	Dromore	22	19	Ballynahinch II	

=== 2020s ===
Year	Winner			Runner-up	Notes
2019–20	Enniskillen	18	17	Armagh II	
2020–21	not played due to Covid-19 pandemic			width=200	
2021–22	Clogher Valley	43	12	Armagh II	
2022–23	Ballyclare	43	42	Enniskillen	
2023–24	Dromore	30	17	City of Derry	
2024–25	Enniskillen	23	16	Dromore	
2025–26	Enniskillen	48	14	Ballynahinch II	
