= City of Derry R.F.C. =

Irish rugby union club, based in Derry

(Northern Ireland) City of Derry RFC
- Full name: City of Derry Rugby Football Club
- Nickname: CoD or CDRFC
- Founded: 1881; 145 years ago
- Location: Ulster
- Grounds: Judges Road, Derry; County Londonderry, BT47 6LN; Northern Ireland
- President: Mike Poole
- Coach: Richard McCarter
- League: Ulster Rugby Championship Division 1
Team kit

City of Derry Rugby Football Club is a rugby union club, formed in 1881 in Derry, Ireland. They currently play in the Ulster Rugby Championship Division 1 after relegation from Division 2C of the All-Ireland League in 2022.

The club's purpose-built facility is at Judges Road, situated just outside Strathfoyle. The stadium itself was briefly named after the YouTuber Craig "Mini Ladd" Thompson, who sponsored the club in November 2017. The sponsorship ended on 1 July 2020 after sexual misconduct allegations against minors surfaced against him.

== History ==
The club was established in 1881, winning the Irish Provincial Towns Cup in the following season.

In December 2001, the club was involved in a controversial appeal, involving a £4,000 fine and the deduction of 8 points after fielding an ineligible player. This resulted in the club being relegated from the AIB Division Two. In March 2007, the club hosted a youth project that saw 13 different primary schools compete. Following relegation, the club appointed New Zealander Bevan Lynch in June 2008 as head coach. Lynch set about improving the club's fortunes, and club were unbeaten in all competitions in the 2008–2009 season. In the following 2009–2010 season, they won the All Ireland Junior Cup, the Ulster Qualifying League and were promoted back into the All Ireland League. The club also has under 19, under 17, under 15 and under 13 teams, as well as mini and ladies sections

== Honours ==
- All-Ireland Junior Cup: (1)
  - 2009–10
- Ulster Senior Cup: (1)
  - 1999–2000
- Ulster Senior League: (1)
  - 1999–2000
- Ulster Towns Cup: (12)
  - 1882–83, 1888–89, 1890–91, 1891–92, 1892–93, 1896–97, 1897–98, 1907–08, 1934–35, 1935–36, 2008–09, 2012–13 (Shared with Ballyclare)
- Ulster Junior Cup: (3)
  - 1897–98, 1945–46, 2008–09

== Notable players ==
=== Ireland ===
The following City of Derry players have represented Ireland at full international level.

- Alexander Foster
- Noel Henderson
- Gerald Glynn Allen
- Charles Elliot Allen
- Ken Goodall

=== British and Irish Lions ===
The following City of Derry players have also represented the British and Irish Lions.

- Alexander Foster: 1910
- Noel Henderson: 1950
- Ken Goodall: 1968

== AIB Junior Cup ==
In January 2010, City of Derry beat Armagh by 2 points to win their first ever AIB Junior Cup title.
