= Enniskillen RFC =

Irish rugby union club, based in Northern Ireland

- Full name: Enniskillen Rugby Football Club
- Union: (Ireland) IRFU
- Branch: Ulster
- Nickname: The Skins
- Founded: 1925; 101 years ago
- Location: Enniskillen
- Region: Fermanagh
- Ground: Ardgart (Capacity: 1,000)
- Chairman: Trevor Whittaker
- President: Tommy Dane
- Director of Rugby: Alastair Keys
- Coach: Alastair Keys
- Captain: Steven Fox
- League: Ulster Rugby Championship
- 2025–26: 1st.
Team kit

Official website
- www.enniskillenrfc.com

Enniskillen RFC is a rugby union club, based in the town of Enniskillen in County Fermanagh, Northern Ireland. It is affiliated to the Ulster Branch of the IRFU. The club fields both men's and women's adult teams as well as underage teams at all levels. Having been a Junior club since its founding in 1925, the club attained Senior status in 2026 as both its men's and women's 1st XV teams gained promotion to the All-Ireland League.

== History ==
The club was founded in 1925 and enjoyed early success, winning the McMillan Cup in 1928 and 1929. This continued into the 1930s with the club winning the Provincial Towns Cup in 1934 and 1937. In 1966 the club acquired land in Mullaghmeen, just outside Enniskillen for its permanent home, which is where it remains today. In 1987, the club won the Ulster Junior League for the first time as well as the McMillan Cup again.

The 21st century brought further success for the club as they bridged an 82 year gap to win the Provincial Towns Cup in 2019 and then won the Ulster Junior Cup in 2020. They reached the final of the All-Ireland Junior Cup in 2023 but lost to neighbours and rivals Clogher Valley. In 2024 they won the Provincial Towns Cup for a fourth time. They reached the final of the All-Ireland Junior Cup again in 2025 but lost, this time to Bective Rangers, but they did win the Ulster Junior Cup that season.

2026 proved to be a very successful year for the club as both the men's and women's 1st XV teams won their respective Ulster Junior Cup, Ulster Rugby Championship and promotion to the All-Ireland League for the first time.

== Honours ==
- Ulster Championship: 1986–87, 2025–26
- Ulster Junior Cup: 2020, 2025, 2026
- Provincial Towns Cup: 1934, 1937, 2019, 2024
- McMillan Cup: 1928, 1929, 1987
- Ulster Academy Cup: 2026

== Notable players ==
- Robert Baloucoune
- Claire Boles
- Kathryn Dane
- Aaron Seaman
