= Ards RFC =

Irish rugby union club, based in Newtownards, Co.Down

(Northern Ireland) Ards RFC
- Full name: Ards Rugby Football Club
- Union: IRFU; Ulster
- Nickname: Black Knights
- Founded: 1928; 98 years ago
- Ground(s): Hamilton Park, Newtownards
- President: Robin Johnston
- Director of Rugby: Stephen Nutt
- Coach: Palmer Eccles
- Captain: Robbie Johnston
Team kit

Ards Rugby Football Club is a rugby union club based in Newtownards, County Down, Northern Ireland, playing in the Ulster Rugby Championship Division 2. It is affiliated to the Ulster Branch of the Irish Rugby Football Union. The club currently fields three adult teams and a women's team, North Down Women, who are a combination of players from Ards, Bangor and Donaghadee. Growing Youth teams for both girls and boys rugby play at under-18, under-16 and under-14 levels, as well as a rapidly growing and successful Mini Rugby section in the club. The club works in close collaboration with local schools such as Regent House Grammar School, Movilla High School and Strangford College who provide much of the playing talent at the club.

== Foundation ==
On 11 April 1928, Ards Rugby Football Club was formed at a meeting in Newtownards Academy pavilion. The first competitive game was played on 13 October 1928. Ards RFC played most of their early years in the Ulster Junior Leagues.

== 1st Team ==
In the 1961-62 season Ards won the Towns Cup for the first time captained by Bobby Haslett. In 1977-1978 season Ards achieved senior status when they gained promotion to the Ulster Senior League by defeating Ballymena 2nd XV 12-0 in an Ulster League Section 2 playoff at Shane Park, Instonians. After a downturn in fortunes in the 1990s Ards were relegated from senior rugby for the 2000–2001 season to Qualifying League Section 1. However, in the 2002-2003 season Ards won the AIB All Ireland Qualifying Round Robin playoff and were promoted for a second time to the All-Ireland League. In 2015 Ards were relegated from the All-Ireland League and played in the Ulster Rugby Championship Division 2.

At the end of the 2024-25 season, Ards finished 3rd in Ulster Rugby Championship Division 2 and Runners-Up in the Ulster Junior Shield following a close 17-13 loss to Carrickfergus.

Head Coach Palmer Eccles made no secret of the club's ambitions for the 2025-26 season; to win the Junior Shield and promotion to Ulster Rugby Championship Division 1. Defeating Randalstown 37-17 on a 27th December final they won the 2025-26 Ulster Junior Shield. Finishing second in Ulster Rugby Championship Division 2 they earned a promotion opportunity through a play-off match against CIYMS, winning 41-14 they make a return to Ulster Rugby Championship Division 1 for the 2026-27 season.

== Honours ==
Boston Floodlit Cup, Bangor: 1 1976-77

- Ulster Senior Cup: 2
  - 1984-85, 1986–87
- Ulster Senior League: 1
  - 1983-84
- Ulster Towns Cup: 2
  - 1961-62, 2002–03
- Ulster Junior Cup: 1
  - 1976-77
- Ulster Junior League 1: 3
  - 1971-72, 1974-75, 1977-78
- Qualifying League 1: 1
  - 2002-03
- Ulster Junior Shield: 1
  - 2025-26

== Notable Former Players ==
=== Internationals ===
(British & Irish Lions) British and Irish Lions

- Nigel Carr
- Phillip Matthews
- Paddy Mayne

Ireland

- Nigel Carr
- Kenny Hooks
- Harry Millar
- Phillip Matthews
- Paddy Mayne

New Zealand

- Scott Robertson
