= Instonians =

Irish sports club based in Belfast, Northern Ireland

Instonians is a sports club based in Belfast, Northern Ireland, that incorporates rugby union, men's and ladies' hockey and cricket sections. There is also a golf society that plays under the Instonians name.

Instonians Rugby Football, Cricket and Athletic Clubs merged on 1 April 1962, the combined sections being known as 'Instonians', and then on 31 May 1979 the title of the club was changed to Instonians Rugby Football and Cricket Club. Finally on 1 April 1988, the Instonians Men's Hockey Club joined the association when the title reverted to Instonians.

== Membership ==
The club was closed to former pupils or staff of Royal Belfast Academical Institution, which regards itself as one of the leading schools in Belfast. Instonians was the last 'old boys' club in Ireland to finally open its membership to all in 1990.

== Grounds ==
The club for many years used the Royal Belfast Academical Institution grounds at Bladon Drive, Osborne Park and Orangefield, before moving to its own grounds at Shane Park in 1965. Shane Park was sold for redevelopment in 1999 and the club now groundshares at the Shaw's Bridge Sports Complex with Cooke.

== Rugby ==
Instonians
- Full name: Instonians Rugby Club
- Union: (Ireland) IRFU
- Branch: Ulster
- Founded: 1919; 107 years ago
- Location: Belfast
- Region: Antrim
- Ground: Shaws Bridge Sports Complex
- Chairman: Alan Stewart
- President: Graeme McCausland
- Director of Rugby: Clem Boyd
- Coach: Paul Pritchard
- Captain: David Whitten
- League: A.I.L. Div. 1B
- 2024–25: 1st – promoted
Team kit

Official website
- instonians.org

Instonians Rugby Club started as a section within the Belfast Old Instonians Association. The original part of the modern-day club, it started play in the Ulster Junior League in season 1919–20, and produced play of sufficient quality to merit immediate election to the Ulster Senior League for the following season.

As of 2025 the 1st XV currently plays in the All Ireland League, Division 1B.

Instonians have won the Ulster Senior Cup twenty times, the Ulster Junior Cup four times and the Ulster Senior League seven times (with five shared titles).

31 Instonians rugby players have been capped by Ireland at full International level and the club has produced two British and Irish Lions captains.

=== Honours ===
- All-Ireland Cup: 1
  - 1926–27
- Ulster Senior Cup: 20
  - 1921–22, 1922–23, 1926–27, 1927–28, 1928–29, 1930–31, 1933–34, 1937–38, 1945–46, 1947–48, 1948–49, 1949–50, 1953–54, 1955–56, 1956–57, 1957–58, 1964–65, 1978–79, 1998–99, 2023-24
- Ulster Senior League: 12 (5 shared)
  - 1924–25, 1925–26, 1926–27 (shared), 1927–28, 1950–51 (shared), 1952–53 (shared), 1953–54 (shared), 1956–57 (shared), 1957–58, 1959–60, 1984–85, 1986–87
- Ulster Junior Cup: 5
  - †1936–37, †1959–60, †1973–74, †1993–94, 2014–15

† Won by 2nd XV

== Ladies' Hockey ==
Instonians Ladies' Hockey is somewhat unusual in that the club is associated with a boys' school. However, the ladies' hockey section was the second part of the club to be formed in 1921. Membership was initially made up from wives, sisters, daughters and girlfriends of Inst old boys and staff.

The ladies' hockey club was one of the most successful club sides in Ulster over a period from 1930 until the mid-1960s. They were winners of the Ulster Shield on ten occasions and won the Irish Senior Cup in 1955. The dawning of the 1970s saw a gradual decline in playing standards, and eventually Senior League status was lost.

They took up a nomadic existence moving from ground to ground over the past twenty years. However 2006 saw Instonians Ladies' Hockey Club renew its connection with the parent club with the opening of a new water-based artificial turf pitch at the Shaw's Bridge Sports Complex.

Instonians Ladies currently play in Section Four of the Senior League (following the restructuring of the ladies leagues in 2007 removing Qualifying and Intermediate Sections) of the Ulster Women's Hockey Union.

== Cricket Club ==
Instonians Cricket Club was founded in 1932. The first team currently plays in the Premier League of the NCU Senior League.

=== Honours ===
- NCU Senior League: 6 (2 shared)
  - 1962, 2009 (shared), 2013 (shared), 2014, 2016, 2023, 2025
- NCU Challenge Cup: 3
  - 1964, 2009, 2012
- Ulster Cup: 4
  - 1999, 2007, 2010, 2011
- NCU Junior Cup: 4
  - †1967, †1970, †2001, †2017

† Won by 2nd XI

== Men's Hockey Club ==
Instonians Men's Hockey Club was formed in 1959. The first team is one of the top teams in Ireland, winning the Irish Senior Cup on four occasions with their initial success coming in 1995. Four Irish Club Championships have also been won.

In association with Royal Belfast Academical Institution the club have just completed the purchase and laying of a water-based artificial turf playing surface at the Shaws Bridge Sports Complex.

== Notable former players ==
=== Rugby union ===
(British & Irish Lions) British and Irish Lions

- David Hewitt
- David Irwin
- Ronnie Lamont
- Colin Patterson
- Robin Thompson
- Sam Walker

Ireland

- Keith Crossan
- David Hewitt
- James Hume
- David Irwin
- Ronnie Lamont
- Michael Lowry
- Colin Patterson
- Peter Russell
- Robin Thompson
- Sam Walker
- Roger Wilson

=== Cricket ===
Ireland men's internationals

- Herbie Martin; played rugby union for Instonians.
- Regan West

=== Field hockey ===
Ireland men's internationals

- Paul Gleghorne
- Mark Gleghorne (and England and Great Britain)
- Terry Gregg (and Great Britain)
- Michael Watt

Ireland women's internationals

- Maeve Kyle

=== Olympians ===
(Republic of Ireland) Ireland

- Paul Gleghorne; field hockey – 2016
- Maeve Kyle; athletics – 1956, 1960, 1964
- Michael Watt; field hockey – 2016

(United Kingdom) Great Britain

- Mark Gleghorne; field hockey – 2016
