= Claire Boles =

Ireland international rugby union player

- Born: 28 May 1998 (age 28) Enniskillen, Co Fermanagh
- Height: 1.69 m (5 ft 7 in)
- Weight: 70 kg (154 lb)

Rugby union career
- Position: Back Row
Senior career
Years	Team	Apps	(Points)
–	Enniskillen RFC		
2017-	Railway Union		
Provincial / State sides
Years	Team	Apps	(Points)
- Ulster
2023-	Wolfhounds	7	(0)
International career
Years	Team	Apps	(Points)
2019–	Ireland	8	(0)
- Correct as of 7 September 2025
National sevens team
Years	Team		Comps
2017-	Ireland 7s		

Claire Boles (born 28 May 1998) is an Irish rugby player from Enniskillen, Co Fermanagh. She plays for Railway Union, Ulster and Ireland. She plays for the Ireland women's national rugby union team and the Ireland women's national rugby sevens team. She is a student based in Dublin.

== Club career ==
Enniskillen native Boles began rugby at her school, Enniskillen Collegiate Grammar, before joining the first girls' team at Enniskillen alongside lifelong friend and Ireland teammate Kathryn Dane.

She was part of the first Ulster team to win Ireland's Under-18 interprovincial title in 2016.

She played with the Ulster XV and Sevens sides before being selected for the Ireland U18 Sevens in 2016, and from there she joined the Ireland Sevens programme and made her senior Sevens debut in Clermont in 2017.

Boles, like Irish teammates Stacey Flood and Katie Heffernan, spent two months in Australia in the summer of 2018, where she played with Bond University in the AON University Sevens.

== International career ==
Boles made her debut for Ireland XVs in the 2019 Women's Six Nations against Scotland and was also a replacement against Italy and France in that competition.

She suffered a serious hamstring injury playing for her club in early 2020 that needed surgery so missed the 2020 Six Nations.

She was selected for the Ireland women's national rugby union team for the 2021 Women's Six Nations. She was also selected for the Ireland women's national rugby sevens team for the 2021–22 season.

Boles competed for Ireland at the 2024 Summer Olympics in Paris.

She was named in Ireland's XV's side for the 2025 Six Nations Championship in March. On 11 August, she also made the Irish squad to the Rugby World Cup.

== Personal life ==
Boles is studying chemical engineering at the University College Dublin. She has a twin, Katie, who also played rugby for Enniskillen. She grew up on a farm.
