= Kenny Hooks =

Rugby union player from Northern Ireland

- Full name: Kenneth John Hooks
- Born: 1 January 1960 (age 66) Markethill, Co. Armagh, Northern Ireland
- School: Bangor Grammar School

Rugby union career
- Position: Wing
International career
Years	Team	Apps	(Points)
1981–91	Ireland	6	(4)

Kenneth John Hooks (born 1 January 1960) is a former Ireland rugby union international from Northern Ireland.

== Early life and education ==
Born in Markethill, Hooks attended Bangor Grammar School and earned four Irish Schools caps.

== Career ==
Hooks, a winger, spent his career with Ards, Bangor, Queen's University and Ulster, while appearing in six Test matches for Ireland. He debuted against Scotland in the 1981 Five Nations Championship, then had to wait eight and a half years until his next cap, as a late call up against the 1989 visiting All Blacks. His only Ireland try was the opener in a win over Argentina at Lansdowne Road in 1990, which was the first ever official Test between the countries.

A teacher by profession, Hooks is a school head at The Royal School, Armagh. He was named Ulster Rugby's "Coach of the Year" in 2004, having led the school's rugby XV to the Ulster Schools' Cup title, their first since 1977.

== See also ==
- List of Ireland national rugby union players
