= Omagh Academicals RFC =

Irish rugby union club based in County Tyrone

(Northern Ireland) Omagh Academicals
- Full name: Omagh Academicals Rugby Football Club
- Union: (Ireland) IRFU
- Branch: Ulster
- Nickname: Omagh Accies
- Founded: 1952; 74 years ago
- Location: Omagh
- Region: County Tyrone
- Ground: Thomas Mellon Playing Fields
- Coach: Glenn Kyle
- League: All-Ireland League, Div. 2C,
- 2024–25: 9th - Relegated
Team kit

Official website
- www.omaghrugby.com

Omagh Academicals RFC is a Northern Irish rugby union club from Omagh, County Tyrone, playing in Division 2C of the All-Ireland League.

== History ==
Omagh Academicals RFC were formed in 1952, drawing many of its players from past pupils of Omagh Academy, where the club also draws its name from.

The club occupies a 4 pitch site in the North Omagh, just off the Beltany Road, as well as having a large clubhouse and on-site gym.

Omagh field 4 Men’s teams on a weekly basis, as well as a Women’s side, and various youth and mini’s teams. The 1st XV were first promoted to the All-Ireland League in 1996, but were relegated in 2000, before winning promotion again in 2017. Since then the club has played in Division 2C of the AIL.

== Honours ==
- Ulster Towns Cup: 1
  - 2001-02
- Ulster Junior Cup: 4
  - 1981-82, 1982–83, 1992-83
