= Cooke RFC =

Irish rugby union club, based in Belfast, Northern Ireland

(Northern Ireland) Cooke Rugby Football Club
- Branch: Ulster
- Founded: 1910; 116 years ago
- Location: Belfast
- Ground: Shawsbridge Sports Complex (Capacity: 1,300; 300 balcony)
- President: Robin Boyd

Cooke Rugby Football Club, which was founded in 1910, is the oldest junior rugby club in Belfast, Northern Ireland. They currently field 3 Senior Men's teams, the 1st XV playing in Qualifying 1, and a successful Women's team, which competes in the Women's All-Ireland League.

== History ==
It owes its origins to the members of a Bible class in the Cooke Centenary Presbyterian Church in the Ballynafeigh area. It was originally based at Upper Galwally until 1991 and the first clubhouse was a small black wooden hut. The club then moved to its present modern clubhouse and grounds of 36 acres (150,000 m^{2}) at Shaws Bridge, Belfast.

Cooke had a cricket club which merged with elements within the cricket section of Belfast Harlequins associated with the former Collegians Cricket Club in 1998 and plays as Cooke Collegians. They are also affiliated with the Cooke Ladies Hockey Club and their club colours are black and white.

== Honours ==
=== Rugby ===
- Ulster Junior Cup: 2
  - 1986–87, 2006–07

== External reference ==
Sources: Belfast Newsletter, The Belfast Telegraph.

Cooke Rugby Club
