= Clogher Valley RFC =

Irish rugby union club, based in Fivemiletown, Co.Tyrone

(Northern Ireland) Clogher Valley RFC
- Full name: Clogher Valley Rugby Football Club
- Union: (Ireland) IRFU
- Branch: Ulster
- Founded: 1990; 36 years ago
- Ground(s): The Cran, Fivemiletown, County Tyrone
- President: Mark Henderson
- Coach: Stephen Bothwell
- Captain: Paul Armstrong
- League: All-Ireland League, Div. 2B
- 2024–25: 3rd.
Team kit

Official website
- www.pitchero.com/clubs/cloghervalleyrfc

Clogher Valley Rugby Football Club is an Irish rugby union club based in Fivemiletown, County Tyrone, Northern Ireland. Founded in 1990, they climbed the Ulster rugby pyramid and in 2023 were promoted to senior status, joining the All-Ireland League in Division 2C, and the Ulster Rugby Premiership. Ireland international Chris Farrell is a product of the Clogher Valley youth system.

The club was founded in 1990 by former pupils of Fivemiletown College, competing in Minor League 8 in the Ulster rugby leagues.

They made the final of the Ulster Junior Cup in 2003, 2007 and 2008, and first won the competition in 2012, defeating Ballynahinch at Ravenhill. They won the Ulster Towns Cup in 2007, 2011, 2012 and 2014.

They made the final of the 2014 All-Ireland Junior Cup, losing to Enniscorthy. They won it in 2022, beating Ballyclare in the final at Ravenhill Stadium, and the Ulster Junior Cup, beating City of Armagh 2nd XV.

In 2022–23 they won the Ulster Rugby Championship and were entered into the playoffs for promotion to the All-Ireland League. They achieved senior status for the first time after beating Leinster League champions Bective Rangers and Munster junior champions Richmond, They finished second in Division 2 of the 2023 Ulster Rugby Premiership, and finished as champions of Division 2C of the 2023–24 All-Ireland League, earning automatic promotion to Division 2B.
