= Collegians (Belfast) =

Former sports club in Belfast, Northern Ireland

Collegians Club

Location
- 45a Deramore Park; Belfast, County Antrim, BT9 5JX; Northern Ireland

Information
- Established: 1890
- Merged with North of Ireland Cricket & FC: 1999; 27 years ago
- Colours: Navy, maroon & white
- Affiliation: Methodist College Belfast
- Sports: Hockey, Rugby Union, Athletics, Basketball & Cricket

Collegians was a sports club for former pupils of Methodist College Belfast. In the 109-year history of the club, it had rugby union, cricket, hockey, basketball, and athletics sections. The cricket section merged with Cooke Cricket Club in 1998 to form Cooke Collegians, and the remainder of the club is now called Belfast Harlequins after a merger with the North of Ireland Football Club in 1999.

Collegians was the name for rugby union, hockey and cricket sections. The rugby club celebrated its centenary in 1990. The ladies' hockey section commenced play under the Collegians name in 1896 until around 1906 and then they played for many years on a non-competitive basis under the name of Methodist College Old Girls. The ladies resumed play under the Collegians name in 1942. The Collegians men's hockey section was much younger, commencing play in 1967. During the 1950s and 1960s Collegians also fielded a highly successful basketball team that won several cups.

Debate grew from the 1960s onward over the opening of club membership to all. Change finally came over a period from 1988 to 1990, with each section adopting its own change date. Initially there was a quota imposed to try to preserve the ethos of the club, but the quota system was quickly dispensed with.

Collegians Rugby Club won the Senior Cup on 8 occasions, the Senior League 7 times and the Junior Cup 7 times. Prior to the First World War Collegians were known as the Rosetta Men as they played their home games at Rosetta Park, close to the current Ravenhill ground of Ulster Rugby. William McFadzean VC played rugby for the team prior to the First World War.

In September 1967, Collegians Men's Hockey Club played and won its first ever competitive fixture, with a 1–0 win against Gallaher. In the first season promotion to the Intermediate League was secured with an unbeaten record in the league. This success was carried over to the 1968–69 season and the Intermediate League was again won. However, a restructuring of the leagues meant that the 1st XI had to win the League for the second year in succession to receive promotion to Senior League Section 2. The overall playing record in the first season was played 26, won 22, drawn 1, lost 3. They scored 111 goals and conceded 3.

In their first season in senior hockey, they were pipped for promotion by one point, remaining unbeaten (Played 18, won 8, drew 10). However, the following year promotion to the top section in the Senior League was achieved. The team finished level on points with Annadale, winning a test match by two goals to one to gain their place in Senior League One.

== Honours ==
=== Rugby ===
- Ulster Senior Cup: 8
  - 1905–06, 1909–10, 1912–13, 1925–26, 1951–52, 1960–61, 1961–62, 1982–83
- Ulster Senior League: 8 (1 shared)
  - 1902–03, 1907–08, 1910–11, 1912–13, 1950–51 (shared), 1951–52, 1955–56, 1961–62
- Ulster Junior Cup: 7
  - 1891–92, †1893–94, †1900–91, †1901–02, †1902–03, †1960–61, †1961–62

† Won by 2nd XV
