= Belfast Harlequins Ladies Rugby =

Harlequins Women
- Full name: Belfast Harlequins Women's Rugby
- Founded: 2008
- Region: Belfast
- Ground: Deramore Park
- Chairman: Jen Goodall
- Coach: Charlie Blackburn
- Captain(s): Jordan Agnew, Nuala Mckeown
- League: Deloitte Ulster Women's Championship

Official website
- www.quinswomensrugby.co.uk

Belfast Harlequins Ladies Rugby is a rugby union team based in Belfast, Northern Ireland. The team is part of the multi-sport organization, Belfast Harlequins.

== History ==
In 2008, Belfast Harlequins RFC opened its doors to developing a ladies team within the rugby section. They approached ex-ulster ladies coach, Nathan Moore, in 2008, to coach the squad, and had an open day in May 2008 which attracted over 20 adult ladies.

In the initial ladies development plan, the first year of the club was to develop the players skills and seek occasional friendly games. However, with the influx of players into the club it was decided to go straight into All Ireland Division 2 North.

=== Inaugural season: 2008/2009 ===
The first season (2008/2009) was a hard fought one, with the Harlequins Ladies only winning 2 out of their season fixtures.

=== Inaugural season, 2009/2010 ===
In their second season (2009/2010) the adult squad grew to approximately 30 players and made a good account for themselves finishing mid table in A.I.L Division 2 North and competing in the Carrick 10's in May and entering a Tag team into the IRFU Tag leagues during the summer months. In their third season (2010/2011) the recruitment drive in the Tag leagues and by the dedicated recruitment team saw the adult playing numbers rise to over 40+ and for the first time in Ulster rugby history the club was able to field two competitive teams, one in AIL Division 2 North and the Ulster Development League. Both teams entered the Ulster Provincial Cup, and the 1st XV entered the AIL cup. Again, both of the teams entered the Carrick 10’s tournament and both reached finals in the competition, the 2nd XV (named the Quins Barbarians) reached the bowl final, and the 1st XV reached the cup final and were winners of the Plate. At the end of the season the ladies qualified to the first All-Ireland 7s finals and came away winners of the Plate against a number of AIL 1 team. During the season the club also started development on a youth structure and have formed links with a number of schools in the Belfast area. In 2009/10 there were 6 youth players and in 2010/2011 this number grew to having 16 youth players between the ages of 12-17 years of age.

== Honours ==
- Ulster Junior shield - 2022, 2023

== 7's Tournament ==
The club hosts a 7's tournament every August inviting teams from around the United Kingdom to take part in a day-long competition. In its first year, eight teams took part with a Canadian touring side entering along with teams from Ireland. St. Mary's was the first-ever winners of the tournament in 2010.
