= Stewart McKinney (rugby union) =

Irish rugby union player

Stewart Alexander McKinney (born 20 November 1946) is a former Ireland international rugby union player from County Tyrone who was capped 25 times by his country. An abrasive back-row forward, he played for the British and Irish Lions on their tour of South Africa in 1974. Known as Stew, he kicked a penalty in the Lions narrow 11–9 victory over the Orange Free State in game 14 and later wrote a book chronicling the Lions undefeated tour.

McKinney represented Ulster and played club rugby for Dungannon before moving to England and joining London Irish.

He suffered whiplash on a number of occasions and in later life this has led to dizziness: McKinney's brain will be donated to medical science after his death.
