= Newry R.F.C. =

Irish rugby union club, based in Newry, Co. Down

(Northern Ireland) Newry R.F.C.
- Full name: Newry Rugby Football Club
- Nickname: The Strips
- Founded: 1925; 101 years ago
- Location: Newry, Northern Ireland
- Ground: Telford Park
- Chairman: Paul Little
- Captain: Chris Hanna
- League: Ulster Kukri Qualifying (Section 3)
Team kit

Official website
- www.newryrfc.com

Newry R.F.C. (also known as Newry Rugby Club or Newry RFC) is an Irish amateur rugby union club, founded in 1925 and based Newry, Northern Ireland. The club is a member of the Irish Rugby Football Union Ulster Branch. The club currently fields two senior teams, several junior teams ranging from Minis (6 years old and up) to under-18. The Newry 1st XV currently participate in the Ulster Kukri Qualifying League Section 3 and the Gordon West Cup, while the 2nd XV participate in the Junior Leagues.

== Grounds ==
The club's home ground is known as Telford Park. The team currently has two playing fields located at this ground along with the clubhouse. The clubhouse contains the members' bar and function room. The grounds are located on the outskirts of Newry on the main Newry to Hilltown road between Mackins Concrete and the Cove Bar.
