= Ulster Towns Cup =

Rugby union competition in Ulster, Ireland

The Ulster Towns Cup is a rugby union competition organized by the Ulster branch of the Irish Rugby Football Union.

It is confined to teams outside of Belfast. Since the resumption of play after World War II, where a town is represented by a senior club, their second team is the one that competes.

The Final is traditionally played on Easter Monday at Ravenhill.

The most successful club is Dungannon with 20 wins (19 outright wins and 1 shared win).

The current holders are Ballyclare RFC, following a record 71–14 victory over Clogher Valley in 2023.

== FINALS ==
(Records are incomplete)

=== 1880s ===
- 1883 City of Derry
- 1884 Dungannon
- 1885 Bessbrook
- 1886 Bessbrook & Dungannon (shared)
- 1887 Bessbrook
- 1888 Bessbrook
- 1889 City of Derry

=== 1890s ===
- 1890 Armagh
- 1891 City of Derry
- 1892 City of Derry
- 1893 City of Derry
- 1894 Dungannon
- 1895 Dungannon 1 goal and 1 try – nil Dundalk
- 1896 Dungannon
- 1897 City of Derry
- 1898 City of Derry 3-0 Dungannon
- 1899 Dungannon

=== 1900s ===
- 1900 Competition abandoned over a ground dispute between City of Derry & Dungannon
- 1901 Competition abandoned over a ground dispute between City of Derry & Dungannon
- 1902 Dungannon 18-0 City of Derry
- 1903 Dungannon
- 1904 Bangor 11-3 City of Derry
- 1905 Dungannon 24-0 City of Derry
- 1906 Bangor 12-10 City of Derry
- 1907 Dungannon 15-3 Bangor

(1907 - Bangor successfully protested the result of the original final, as Dungannon fielded an ineligible player and a replay was ordered. The original game finished as a 19–3 victory for Dungannon)

- 1908 City of Derry 8-3 Bangor
- 1909 Bangor 16-8 Armagh

=== 1910s ===
- 1910 Armagh 13-0 Carrickfergus
- 1911 Carrickfergus 11-3 Armagh
- 1912 Dungannon 9-3 Armagh
- 1913 Carrickfergus 8-3 Larne
- 1914 Larne 9-3 Carrickfergus
- 1915-1919 Not played

=== 1920s ===
- 1920 Bangor 5-3 Armagh
- 1921 Larne 7-0 Donaghadee
- 1922 Lurgan 6-0 Larne
- 1923 Bangor 19-8 Dungannon
- 1924 Donaghadee 4-3 Dungannon
- 1925 Lurgan 11-4 Larne
- 1926 Lurgan 17-8 Donaghadee
- 1927 Coleraine 11-3 Lurgan
- 1928 Ballymena 3-0 Lurgan
- 1929 Armagh 8-6 Bangor

=== 1930s ===
- 1930 Bangor 9-7 Dungannon
- 1931 Coleraine 14-9 Larne
- 1932 Ballymena 16-3 Coleraine
- 1933 Banbridge 3-0 Portadown
- 1934 Enniskillen 16-6 Dungannon
- 1935 City of Derry 9-6 Ballymena
- 1936 City of Derry 10-3 Dromore
- 1937 Enniskillen 5-3 Dromore (Replay after 0–0 draw)
- 1938 Coleraine 12-3 Limavady
- 1939 Dromore 17-3 Donaghadee

=== 1940s ===
- 1940-1945 Not played
- 1946 Bangor 11-6 City of Derry (after extra time)
- 1947 Armagh 9-8 Bangor
- 1948 Dungannon 8-0 Ballymena
- 1949 Dungannon 8-3 Ballymena

=== 1950s ===
- 1950 Dungannon 5-3 Lurgan
- 1951 Armagh 3-0 Ballymena
- 1952 Lurgan 11-3 Armagh
- 1953 Ballymena 13-3 Donaghadee
- 1954 Coleraine 5-0 Lurgan
- 1955 Lurgan 3-0 Strabane
- 1956 Bangor 11-6 Lurgan
- 1957 Portadown 12-0 Banbridge
- 1958 Lurgan 11-3 Donaghadee
- 1959 Portadown 11-0 Lurgan

=== 1960s ===
- 1960 Dungannon II 9-6 Ballymena II
- 1961 Dungannon II 14-3 City of Derry
- 1962 Ards 8-3 Dungannon II
- 1963 Ballymena II 9-6 Coleraine
- 1964 Ballynahinch 11-0 Bangor (Replay after 6–6 draw)
- 1965 Dungannon II 3-0 Armagh
- 1966 Dungannon II 5-3 Armagh
- 1967 Coleraine 14-0 Dungannon II
- 1968 Bangor 26-11 Dungannon II
- 1969 Bangor 14-12 Ards

=== 1970s ===
- 1970 Ballymena II 11-3 Dungannon II
- 1971 Armagh 6-3 Ballymena II
- 1972 Bangor II 3-0 Ards
- 1973 Ballymena II 58-7 Ballyclare
- 1974 Ballymena II 23-6 Rainey Old Boys
- 1975 Bangor II 3-0 Dungannon II
- 1976 Ballyclare 19-6 Rainey Old Boys
- 1977 Ballymena II 21-4 Lisburn
- 1978 Ballyclare 18-6 Armagh
- 1979 Ballymena II 6-3 Ballyclare

=== 1980s ===
- 1980 Ballyclare 15-3 City of Derry (Replay after 3–3 draw)
- 1981 Armagh 15-6 Ballynahinch
- 1982 Carrickfergus 3-0 Larne
- 1983 Rainey Old Boys 9-0 Coleraine
- 1984 Coleraine 9-4 Carrickfergus
- 1985 Lisburn 12-6 Rainey Old Boys
- 1986 Ballyclare 18-4 Rainey Old Boys
- 1987 Ballynahinch 9-4 Enniskillen
- 1988 Ballynahinch 9-4 Banbridge
- 1989 Banbridge 9-3 Antrim

=== 1990s ===
- 1990 Ballynahinch 18-11 Ballymena II
- 1991 Ballymena II 13-7 Omagh
- 1992 Carrickfergus 9-3 Ballyclare
- 1993 Banbridge 23-8 Ballyclare
- 1994 Ballymena II 24-10 Rainey Old Boys
- 1995 Ballynahinch 15-13 Banbridge
- 1996 Dungannon II 37-8 Coleraine
- 1997 Coleraine 19-17 Holywood
- 1998 Coleraine 18-8 Dromore
- 1999 Dungannon II 30-10 Coleraine

=== 2000s ===
- 2000 Ballymena II 42-11 Limavady
- 2001 Rainey Old Boys 57-31 Omagh
- 2002 Omagh 32-26 Ballynahinch II
- 2003 Ards 27-20 Coleraine
- 2004 Ballyclare 30-26 Coleraine
- 2005 Ballymena II 23-18 Rainey Old Boys
- 2006 Coleraine 26-22 Clogher Valley
- 2007 Clogher Valley 13-9 Enniskillen
- 2008 City of Armagh 49-6 Portadown
- 2009 City of Derry 14-10 Ballynahinch II

=== 2010s ===
- 2010 Ballymoney 15-14 Clogher Valley
- 2011 Clogher Valley 34-7 Ballynahinch II
- 2012 Clogher Valley 11-0 Ballymena II
- 2013 Ballyclare 28-28 City of Derry II (Trophy Shared)
- 2014 Clogher Valley 15-7 Donaghadee
- 2015 Ballynahinch II 17-13 Clogher Valley
- 2016 Bangor 31-25 Enniskillen
- 2017 Ballynahinch II 17-13 Enniskillen
- 2018 Ballyclare 27-6 Portadown
- 2019 Enniskillen 19-0 Ballyclare

=== 2020s ===
- 2020 Ballyclare v Ballynahinch II (Trophy Shared due to COVID-19 pandemic)
- 2022 Ballyclare 32-27 Dromore
- 2023 Ballyclare 71-14 Clogher Valley
- 2024 Enniskillen 38-22 Ballymena II
- 2024-25 Ballynahinch II 27-17 Dromore
- 2025-26 Dromore 47-24 Omagh
