= Ballyclare RFC =

Irish rugby union club, based in Northern Ireland

- Full name: Ballyclare Rugby Football Club
- Union: (Ireland) IRFU
- Branch: Ulster
- Nickname: The Hares
- Founded: 1949; 77 years ago
- Location: Ballyclare
- Region: County Antrim
- Ground: The Cloughan (Capacity: 1,000)
- Chairman: Bob Beckwith
- President: Lyle Andrew
- Director of Rugby: Andrew Wylie
- Coach: Mike Orchin-McKeever
- Captain: Joel McBride
- League: A.I.L. Div. 2C
- 2024–25: 4th.
Team kit

Official website
- www.ballyclarerfc.co.uk

Ballyclare RFC is a rugby union club based in the town of Ballyclare, County Antrim in Northern Ireland. They play in Division 2C of the All-Ireland League since becoming a senior club in 2024.

== History ==
The club was founded on 20 May 1949 as Ballyclarians. The current grounds at The Cloughan are provided by the Old Ballyclarians Association and the clubhouse and pavilion were officially opened in 1992. The 2020s have been the most successful period in the club's history, winning three Ulster Towns Cups, the Ulster Junior Cup, All-Ireland Junior Cup and in 2024 won the Ulster Championship for the first time. They subsequently won promotion to the All-Ireland League.

== Honours ==
- All-Ireland Junior Cup (1) : 2023-24
- All-Ireland Junior Championship (2) : 1977, 1978
- Ulster Championship (1) : 2023-24
- Ulster Junior Cup (3) : 1988–89, 2001–02, 2022-23
- Ulster Towns Cup (10) : 1976, 1978, 1980, 1986, 2004, 2013, 2018, 2020*, 2022, 2023

(2020 shared with Ballynahinch RFC - unfinished due to the COVID-19 pandemic)
