= Banbridge RFC =

Irish rugby union club, based in Banbridge, Co. Down

(Northern Ireland) Banbridge
- Full name: Banbridge Rugby Football Club
- Union: (Ireland) IRFU
- Branch: Ulster
- Founded: 1926; 100 years ago
- Region: Down
- Ground(s): Rifle Park, Banbridge
- Chairman: John Ewart
- President: Alec Waugh
- Director of Rugby: Marc Eadie
- Coach(es): Head Coach- Neil Doak, Assistant Coach- Paddy McAllister, Assistant Coach- Dale Carson, Athletic Development- Coach Brianna Mulhern
- Captain: Matthew Heasley
- League: All-Ireland Div. 2BN
- 2025–26: 10th.
Team kit

Banbridge Rugby Football Club is a rugby union club based in Banbridge, County Down, Northern Ireland, in the province of Ulster. It plays in Division 2BN of the Energia All-Ireland League since gaining promotion in 2017, and Division 1 of the Ulster Rugby Premiership. In addition to the senior team, the club fields another 4 adult junior-standard teams, 2 Women's Teams, an U21 Team, youth pathway U18, U16, U14 and U12 teams (boys & girls), as well as a large mini rugby section and a Mixed Ability Rugby Team named The Barbarians.

== Formation ==
Late in 1925, a group of former Banbridge Academy pupils interested in the game of rugby, got together to form a team to play Newry. The date of that historic first game was 2 January 1926. One of the players in that first game was F. E. McWilliam; later the well known Irish surrealist sculptor.

Banbridge spent the next 72 years in the ranks of Ulster junior rugby, with mixed fortunes.

== Honours ==
- All Ireland League 2A Winners: 1
  - 2016-2017
- Ulster Towns Cup: 3
  - 1932–33, 1988–89, 1992–93
- Ulster Junior Cup: 1
  - 1989-90

== Senior status ==
At the end of the 1997–98 season, Banbridge won the round-robin play-offs against the other provincial qualifying champions Naas, Monivea and Midleton. Their victory secured promotion to Division Four of the All Ireland League for the 1998–99 season. They have remained as an AIL senior club since then. In the 2016–2017 season Banbridge gained promotion to AIL 1B.

== Touring team ==
- The club also have a touring team called the Bluesox that have travelled to Oldham, Newcastle, Cardiff, Edinburgh, The Netherlands, Isle of Man, Czech Republic, Uxbridge, Estonia, Blackpool. Germany, Devon, Germany, Portugal, Irvine, Italy, Leeds, Cardiff, Aylesbury, Bristol, Newcastle, Galway, Carlise, Spain, Malta and Belgium since 1997. In 2020 the tour to Edinburgh was postponed to 2021 due to the Corona Virus Pandemic.

== Notable current players ==
- Nick Timoney, Ulster rugby union team and Ireland national rugby union team
- Mike Lowry, Ulster rugby union team and Ireland national rugby union team
- Nathan Doak, Ulster rugby union team and Ireland national rugby union team

== Notable past players ==
- Tyrone Howe, Ireland and British and Irish Lions
- Simon Best, Ireland
- Rory Best, Ulster rugby union team, Ireland national rugby union team and British and Irish Lions
- James Hume, Ulster rugby union team, Ireland national rugby union team
- Greg Jones, Ulster rugby union team
- Jonny Murphy, Connacht rugby union team
- Luke Marshall, Ulster rugby union team and Ireland national rugby union team
- Eric O'Sullivan, Ulster rugby union team and Ireland national rugby union team
- Rob Lyttle, Ulster rugby union team
