= Thomond RFC =

Irish rugby union club, based in Limerick, Co. Limerick

(Ireland) Thomond RFC
- Full name: Thomond Rugby Football Club
- Union: IRFU; Munster
- Founded: 1944; 82 years ago
- Ground(s): Liam Fitzgerald Park, Limerick
- President: Leon Ledger
Team kit

Official website
- www.thomond.club

Thomond RFC is an Irish rugby union team based in Limerick. The colours of the club are blue and white.

== History ==
Founded in 1944 after a meeting in the old boat club near the Old Distillery in Thomondgate, the club's first competitive match was in the Munster Junior League against Garryowen at Thomond Park on Sunday, 15 October 1944. Thomond ended up winning the match by 15 points to 3. Captained by Christopher ( Willie ) Beville who was also a co-founder.

Their home ground was named in honour of club stalwart Liam Fitzgerald, who served the club for many years. He started out as a player in the late 1950s, became club captain in the 1963/64 season and held the presidency in 1984/85. Known for being a tireless worker, he could often be seen digging drains amongst other things at the ground, which was previously named Woodview Park. Johnny Hanley was amongst the founding founders who gave them great support as did his sons Sean, Ger and Brendan Hanley.

== Notable players ==
=== Ireland ===
- Jim Tydings
- Keith Earls
- Eddie Halvey

=== Munster ===
- Junior Morrison
- Declan Cusack jr
- Fintan Cross
- Maurice Hartery

== Honours ==
- AIL Division 3: 2000/01
- Clare Cup: 1968/69, 1973/74, 1974/75, 1975/76, 1976/77, 1977/78, 1978/79, 1982/83
- Munster Junior Cup: 1970/71, 1979/80, 1980/81, 1984/85, 1988/89, 1989/90, 1990/91
- Munster Junior League: 1991/92, 1998/99, 2023/24, 2024/25
- North Munster League: 1971/72, 1972/73, 1973/74, 1974/75, 1978/79, 1979/80, 1980/81, 1981/82, 1983/84, 1984/85, 1985/86, 1987/88, 1988/89, 1989/90, 1990/91
- Transfield Cup: 1968/69, 1971/72, 1972/73, 1973/74, 1975/76, 1978/79, 1981/82, 1982/83, 1989/90, 1991/92, 1996/97, 2001/02
