= Belfast Harlequins =

Multi-sports club in Belfast, County Antrim, Northern Ireland

Belfast Harlequins Club
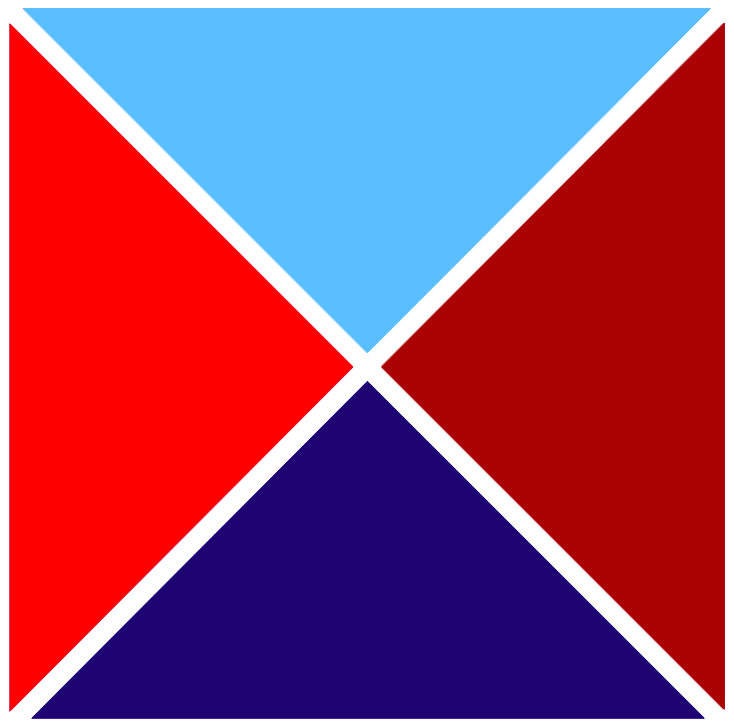

Location
- 45a Deramore Park; Belfast, County Antrim, BT9 5JX; Northern Ireland

Information
- Established: 1999; 27 years ago
- President: Iain Kelly
- Chairperson: Peter Kelly
- Colours: Navy, maroon, red & sky blue
- Affiliation: Methodist College Belfast
- Sports: Hockey, Rugby Union & Squash

Belfast Harlequins is a multi-sports club located off the Malone Road in south Belfast, Northern Ireland. The club name provides the overall umbrella for rugby union, men's and ladies' hockey, and squash. The club is associated on and off the field with Methodist College Belfast (MCB).

== Background of the club ==
Belfast Harlequins was formed in 1999 with the merger of Collegians, North of Ireland Cricket Club and North of Ireland Football Club. The former clubs were three of the oldest and most distinguished clubs in Ireland. "North" sold its famous ground at Ormeau – one of the earliest international rugby venues – to pay for the redevelopment of the Deramore Park facilities.

The club uses a version of the Maltese cross that MCB uses as its sports logo, with the colours being those of navy, sky blue, red and maroon. The North colours were traditionally red, blue and black, with Collegians using navy, white and maroon.

At two extraordinary general meetings held simultaneously in both North and Collegians, the members of both clubs voted to proceed with the merger to form the new club, Belfast Harlequins. As of 12.00 midnight, 18 November 1999, Belfast Harlequins came into existence. The first annual general meeting of the new club took place in March 2000. The new clubhouse at Deramore was opened in June 2002 by the then club president, Alison Watt, along with Jack Kyle OBE and Gilbert Paton.

On and off the field, all three sections of the Belfast Harlequins set-up have been successful. Pictures and memorabilia of both clubs and grounds is placed around the bar area and throughout the club. There is an active social scene, many parties and events take place throughout the season.

== Grounds ==
Deramore is located in the heart of south Belfast, flanked by the River Lagan and Lagan Meadows to the east and south, and overlooked to the north and west by large detached homes.

Deramore Park was the home to Collegians (and of Methodist College from 1919 until the school purchased Pirrie Park from Harland & Wolff in 1932). Deramore Park was bequested in trust for the use of the former pupils of Methody for its life by Charles ("Charlie") Neill in 1941. A special board of trustees exists today in Neill's name, and its consent was required for the merger in 1999, to allow the continued use of Deramore Park by the new club.

Deramore Park has one squash court, three rugby pitches, one cricket pitch, one synthetic hockey pitch, a two-bedroom apartment and one bowling green which Belfast Bowling Club owns and plays on.

In the summer of 2006, Belfast Harlequins hosted several sports in the Special Olympics Ireland Games. The games were held in Belfast for the first time in their history.

Deramore Park was a venue for the 2007 Under 19 Rugby World Championship, which was hosted in Belfast.

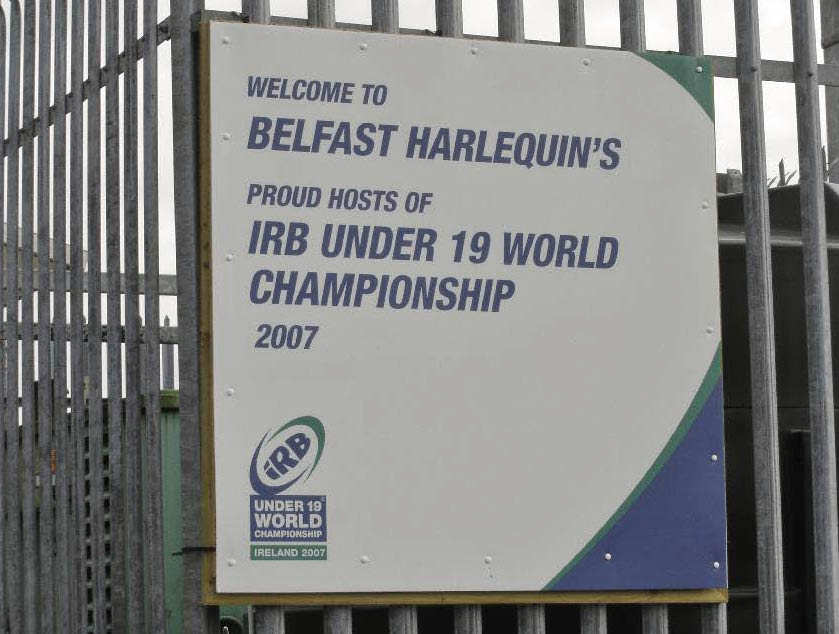
The Welcome sign at Deramore for the Rugby World Cup 2007

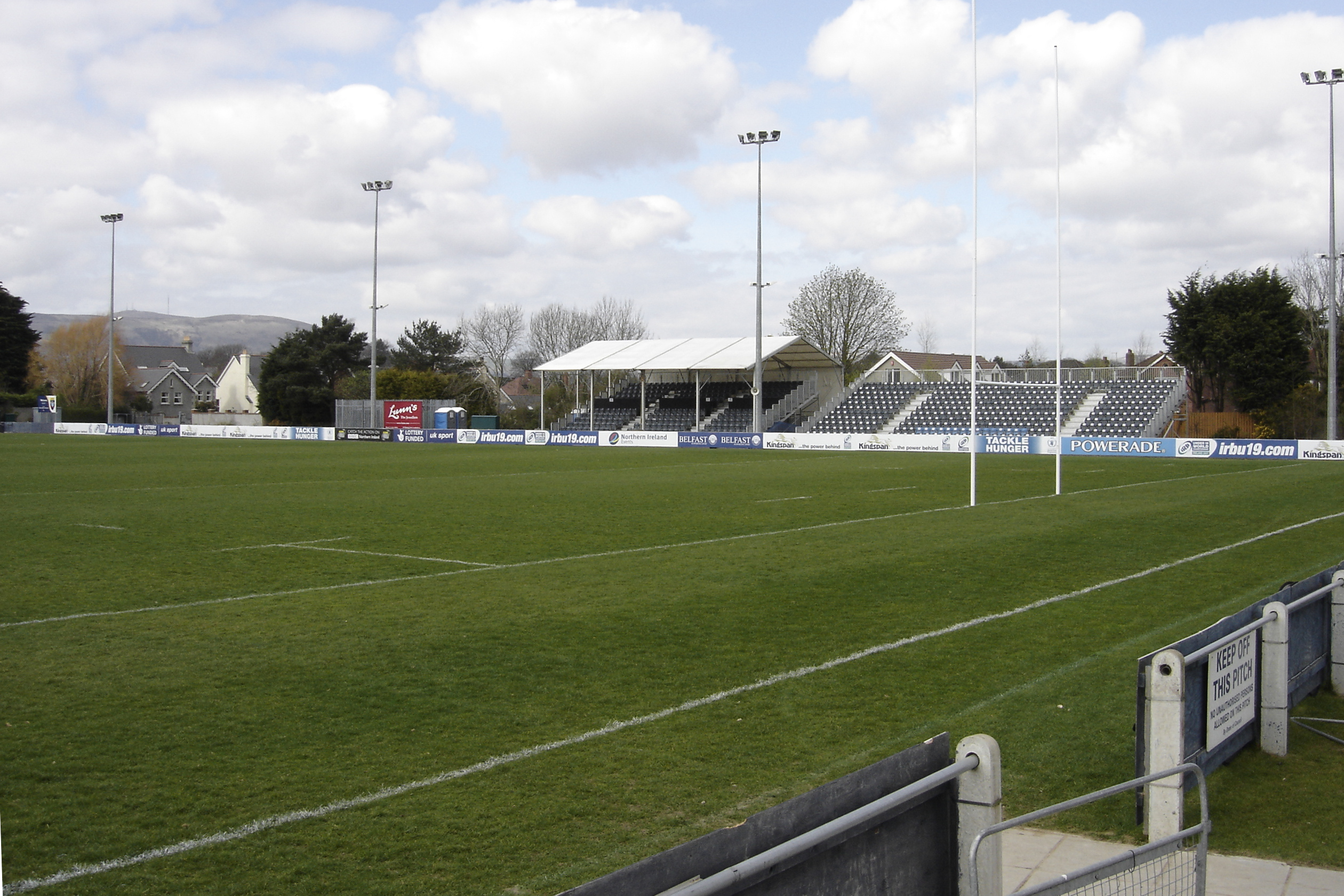
The 1000 seater stand at Deramore for the Rugby World Cup games of April 2007

Clubhouse view of the MCB Hockey Pitch

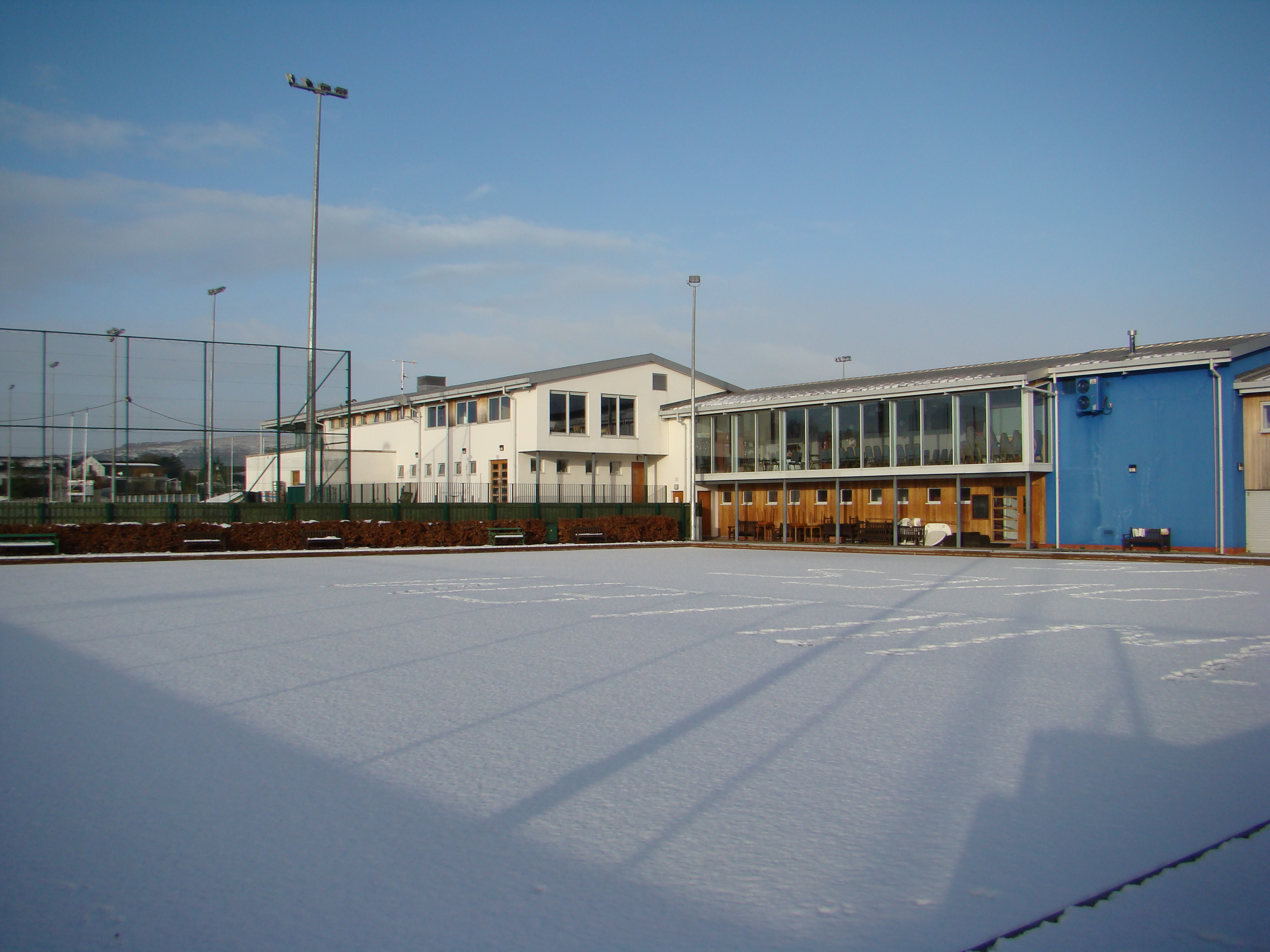
The Bowling Green covered in Snow

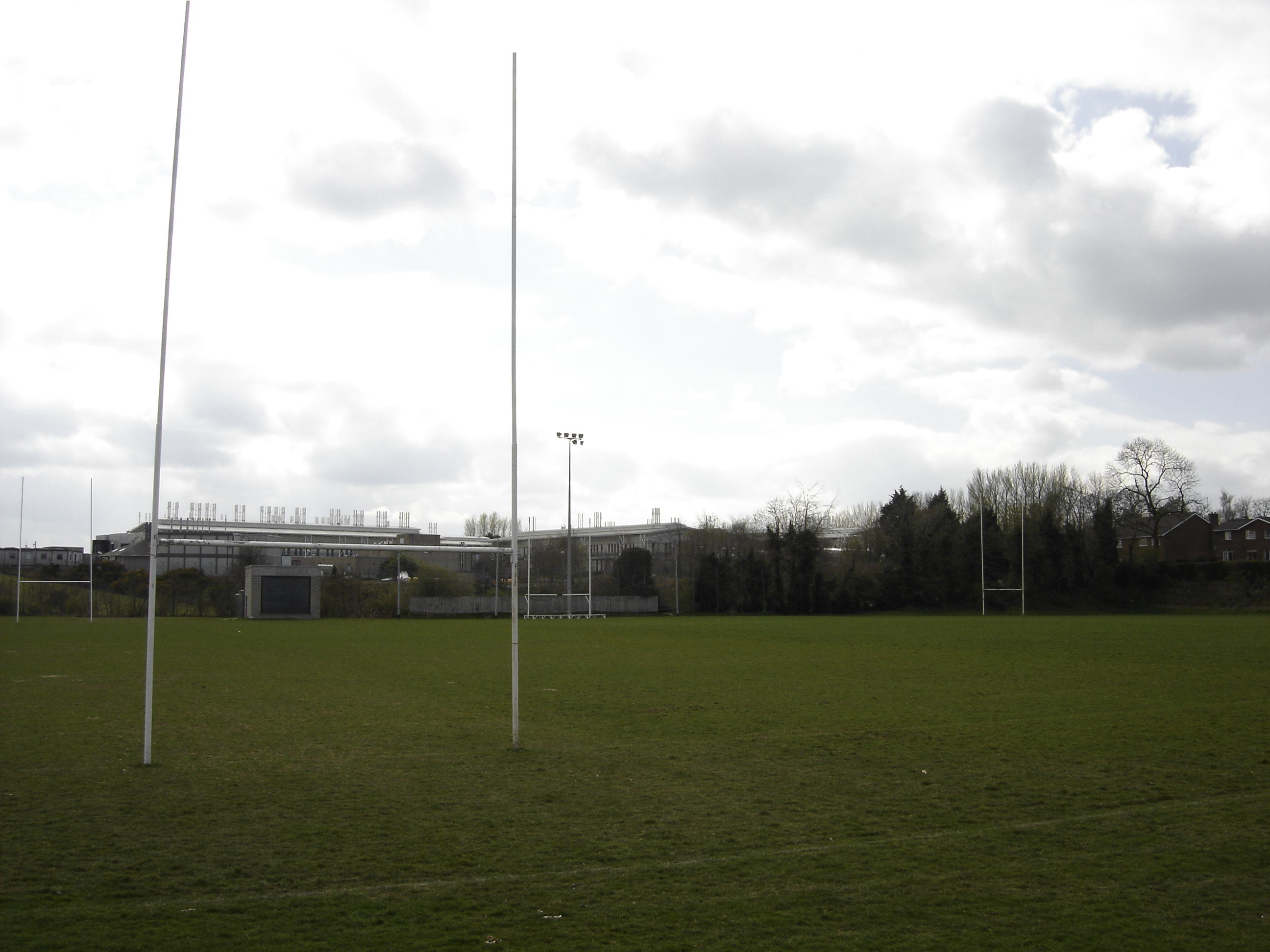
The Back Pitches and Training area, also visible is the Unused Cricket House and the QUB Science Lab.

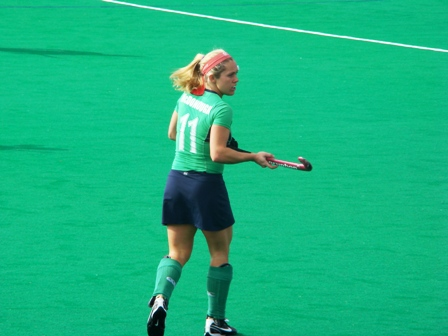
Jenny McDonough playing for Ireland against South Korea in the 2008 Women's Hockey Olympic Qualifier

Harlequins Hockey Branding Logo

== Cricket ==
Collegians Cricket Club had merged with Cooke Cricket Club to form Cooke Collegians in 1998, and so the Belfast Harlequins Cricket Club was effectively a continuation of North. In 2005, however, the cricket section left the Harlequins set-up and now plays at Stormont under the name of Civil Service North of Ireland.

== Hockey ==
The Harlequins hockey sections essentially are that of Collegians as North of Ireland did not have a hockey section since prior to World War I.

In September 1967, Collegians Men's Hockey Club played and won its first ever competitive fixture, with a 1–0 win against Gallaher. In the first season promotion to the Intermediate League was secured with an unbeaten record in the league. This success was carried over to the 1968–69 season and the Intermediate League was again won. However, a restructuring of the leagues meant that the 1st XI had to win the League for the second year in succession to receive promotion to Senior League Section 2. The overall playing record in the first season was played 26, won 22, drawn 1, lost 3. They scored 111 goals and conceded 3.

In their first season in Senior hockey, they were pipped for promotion by one point, remaining unbeaten (Played 18, won 8, drew 10). However, the following year promotion to the top section in the Senior League was achieved. The team finished level on points with Annadale, winning a test match by two goals to one to gain their place in Senior League One.

=== Men's section ===
The Harlequins Men's 1st team play in Premier league set up of the Ulster Branch of the Irish Hockey Union. The Men's section currently fields 4 senior teams, an Under 15s team, and a thriving Mini Hockey section for Under 12s.

The club achieved a place in the top section of the Ulster Senior League as Collegians on two occasions in the 1972–73 and 1988–89 seasons.

In the first season at the new artificial turf pitch at Deramore in 2000–2001 the Belfast Harlequins Men's Team 1st XI won the Linden Cup.

The 2007–2008 season marked the 40th Anniversary of the founding of the men's hockey section.

==== Notable players and administrators ====
Alan Green of BBC Radio 5Live fame spent a few seasons on Collegians First XI prior to pursuing his career in England. He was the first player for Collegians ever to be sent off in a competitive fixture. Players such as former Ireland Under-21 goalkeeper Iain Kelly, Cecil Andrews, Philip Duke, Jonathan Furphy, Clifford Marshall, Ivan Kerr, Alan Smith, David Hutchison and Kevin Ryan formed the backbone of Collegians hockey teams over many years. Recently only Michael Patterson has represented Ulster at Under 16 and 18 level, whilst playing at the club.

The club has had one full Irish International in Ian Kirk-Smith, who gained several full Caps whilst still a Collegian before moving on to Lisnagarvey. The Club has also had several players capped at Ulster Junior level.

On the administrative front Peter Wood served as President of the Ulster Branch of the Irish Hockey Union in 1999.

==== Development ====
In 2006 coaching sessions for Under 15 and Under 12 teams recommenced after a ten-year gap. Approximately fifty boys come to Deramore each week for coaching sessions.

=== Ladies' section ===
Harlequins ladies were promoted from Premier League Ulster Hockey to the EY Irish Hockey League in May 2016.

The Harlequins Ladies played in Section 1 of the Ulster Women's Hockey Union League. The Women's club is the largest in Ulster fielding 7 teams every Saturday.

In 2008 the ladies' 1st XI won a place in the 2008/2009 inaugural All Ireland League.

The ladies' 1st XI has not won a major trophy or competition in its history. The closest was in the Ulster Shield campaigns of 1945, 1993, 1995, 1999 and 2004 when the 1st XI were beaten Finalists. The Plate competition for first round losers in the Ulster Shield has been won on several occasions.

Home games are played on artificial turf at Deramore Park or The Brook Activity Centre and, for more junior teams, occasionally on shale at Pirrie Park.

==== Notable players and Administrators ====
Belfast Harlequins that have represented Ireland at full international level include Jenny McDonough and Suzanne Beaney. Currently Jenna Watt represents Ulster and Ireland at Under-16 Level, Helen Stevenson for Ulster and Irish Under-18 teams. Helen is 1st XI goalkeeper for Harlequins and Methody. Laura Wilson has represented Ireland at Under 18 Level, Rebecca Smith at Ulster Under 18 level and Lauren Hackney at Ulster Under 16 level. Former 1st XI Player Katie Larmour has represented Ulster and Ireland at Under 16, 18 and 21 level. Current 1st XI Goalkeeper, Jade Lamont represents Ulster and Ireland at Under 18 Level. Finally, Lizzie Colvin and Zoe Wilson were members of the Ireland team that reached the final of the 2018 Women's Hockey World Cup winning silver medals

The club has provided a number of Ulster administrators such as former Ulster Women's Hockey Union presidents Gerry Gray and Leslie Spence. Coaches include Alison Watt who has managed the Ulster Ladies' Senior Team. At the Under 16 Schoolgirl Internationals, February 2007, Laura Callaghan made her debut as an International Hockey Umpire.

==== Development ====
Youth hockey is organised by Roisin Walsh, who coaches an Under 14 team that plays in Section 1 of the Under 14s league. The partnership with the school, the 1st XI captain and Methody hockey coach Kelli Thorton, has seen more players coming into the club at all levels.

== Rugby ==
Belfast Harlequins
- Full name: Belfast Harlequins Rugby Football Club
- Union: (Ireland) IRFU
- Branch: Ulster
- Nickname: Quins
- Founded: 1999; 27 years ago
- Location: Belfast
- Ground: Deramore Park (Capacity: 1,000)
- Chairman: Peter Kelly
- President: Martin Malseed
- Director of Rugby: Anthony McKibbin
- Coach: Neil Doak
- Captain: Mark Glover
- League: A.I.L. Div. 2C
- 2024–25: 7th
1st kit	2nd kit	3rd kit

Official website
- www.belfastharlequins.online/rugby

The rugby club plays in the bottom division (Division 2C) of the All-Ireland League. In total, there are 3 senior teams, an under-20 team, an under-18 team, an under-16 team and a ladies' team (Belfast harlequins ladies rugby), who all play in their respective leagues within the Ulster Branch of the Irish Rugby Football Union.

The Belfast Harlequins RFC most successful season was in 2004–2005. They finished third in the league table and played at Lansdowne Road in Dublin in the end of season play-offs. They lost narrowly in the final to Shannon after a poor defensive display in the first half of the game. This is closer than a North or Collegians team had ever come to putting their hands on the Trophy (except for Dungannon RFC and Ballymena RFC who claimed the title in 2000-01 and 2002-03 respectively). The 2006–07 season was a season of ups and downs. Despite winning the Ulster Senior League and reaching the finals of the Ulster Senior Cup and the All-Ireland Cup, the club struggled in the All-Ireland League. In the last game of the season the club failed to beat UCD and were relegated to Division Two.

=== Honours ===
- Ulster Senior Cup: 3
  - 2000–01, 2005–06, 2007–08
- Ulster Senior League: 5 (1 shared)
  - 2002–03, 2003–04, 2004–05 (shared), 2006–07, 2007–08
- Ulster Junior Cup: 1
  - †2003–04

† Won by 2nd XV

== Squash ==
In Squash, Belfast Harlequins have an Irish Junior International in Ben Craig. The team play in the top section of the Ulster League and have had quite a successful run since the new court at Deramore was opened.

== Achievements ==
- 1998–1999
- 1999–2000
- 2000–2001 Men's 1st XI Hockey, Linden Cup Winners. 1st XV Ulster Senior Cup Winners
- 2001–2002 Winners of All Ireland Rugby League Division 2
- 2002–2003 1st XV Ulster Senior League Winners, Men's 3rd XI Hockey Junior 5 Cup
- 2003–2004 RFC Club of the Year, 1st XV Ulster Senior League Winners, 2nd XV Ulster Junior Cup Winners, Winners U20 Roland Barr Competition, Winners of McCrea Cup, YMCA Cup and the Crawford Cup. Men's 4th XI Hockey Minor Cup. Men's 5th XI Hockey Strabane Cup, Men's 3rd XI Hockey Junior 4 Cup
- 2004–2005 Finalists in All Ireland Rugby League Division 1, Men's 3rd XI Hockey Junior 3 Cup
- 2005–2006 1st XV Ulster Senior Cup Winners, Men's 4th XI Hockey Down County Cup.
- 2006–2007 1st XV Rugby Ulster Senior League Winners
- 2007–2008 Belfast Harlequins Ladies won a wild card place in the 2008–2009 inaugural All Ireland League. Rugby 1st XV won Ulster Senior Cup & the Ulster League.

== See also ==
- Collegians
- North of Ireland FC

== External reference ==
Official Websites:

- Belfast Harlequins Rugby
- Belfast Harlequins Hockey
- Methodist College Belfast
- Belfast Harlequins Women's Rugby

== Sources ==
- Collegians Club Centenary Brochure
- 'Farewell to Ormeau' North of Ireland Cricket Club Brochure
