= Ulster Senior Cup (rugby union) =

Irish rugby competition

The Ulster Senior Cup is a knock-out competition for senior rugby union teams in the province of Ulster. It is administered by Ulster Rugby.

The most successful club is Queen's University with 24 wins. The current holders are Ballynahinch.

The winners compete with the other three provincial cup winners for the All-Ireland Cup.

== Entry requirements ==
Entry is currently restricted to rugby clubs from Ulster that play in the All-Ireland League.

== Performance by club ==
Performance Table
Club	Winners	Runners-Up	Total Finals	Last Title
Queen's University	24	19	43	2021-22
Instonians	20	10	30	2023-24
North of Ireland	18	18	36	1972-73
Ballymena	14	11	23	2012-13
Dungannon	10	7	17	2010-11
Collegians	8	12	20	1982-83
Malone	7	16	23	1991-92
C.I.Y.M.S.	6	6	12	1977-78
Ballynahinch	7	4	11	2025-26
Bangor	3	5	8	1985-86
Belfast Harlequins	3	2	5	2007-08
Ards	2	0	2	1986-87
City of Armagh	3	1	4	2019-20
Albion	1	5	6	1888-89
City of Derry	1	2	3	1999-2000
Knock	1	2	3	1910-11
Lisburn	1	1	2	1887-88
Banbridge	0	1	1	n/a
Carrickfergus	0	1	1	n/a
Civil Service	0	1	1	n/a
Fortwilliam	0	1	1	n/a
Holywood	0	1	1	n/a
Rainey Old Boys	0	1	1	n/a

== Finals ==
=== 1880s ===
- 1884-85 NIFC (North of Ireland) 19-4 Lisburn
- 1885-86 Queen's College 6-0 Albion
- 1886-87 Queen's College 5-0 NIFC
- 1887-88 Lisburn 5-0 Albion
- 1888-89 Albion 4-3 Queen's College

=== 1890s ===
- 1889-90 Queen's College 13-0 Albion
- 1890-91 Queen's College 8-0 Albion
- 1891-92 Queen's College 6-0 Albion
- 1892-93 NIFC 3-0 Queen's College (After extra time in Replay)
- 1893-94 NIFC 11-8 Collegians
- 1894-95 NIFC 3-0 Collegians
- 1895-96 NIFC 11-3 Collegians
- 1896-97 NIFC 9-3 Queen's College
- 1897-98 NIFC 13-0 Queen's College
- 1898-99 NIFC 16-3 Collegians

=== 1900s ===
- 1899-1900 Queen's College 16-0 Holywood
- 1900-01 NIFC 14-0 Dungannon
- 1901-02 NIFC 6-0 Malone
- 1902-03 Queen's College 6-0 NIFC
- 1903-04 Malone 10-3 Queen's College
- 1904-05 Malone 8-5 Fortwilliam
- 1905-06 Collegians 8-0 NIFC
- 1906-07 Malone 13-3 Collegians
- 1907-08 NIFC 10-0 Knock
- 1908-09 Queen's University 16-6 NIFC

=== 1910s ===
- 1909-10 Collegians 10-6 Queen's University
- 1910-11 Knock 6-5 NIFC
- 1911-12 Queen's University 13-0 Malone
- 1912-13 Collegians 9-3 Knock
- 1913-14 All Senior Rugby was suspended in early 1914 due to the Home Rule crisis and the Senior Cup was not played.
- 1914-1919 Not played due to World War I

=== 1920s ===
- 1919-20 NIFC 5-0 Queen's University
- 1920-21 Queen's University 19-6 NIFC (at Balmoral)
- 1921-22 Instonians 8-0 Queen's University (at Balmoral)
- 1922-23 Instonians 19-5 Queen's University (at Balmoral)
- 1923-24 Queen's University 16-8 Instonians (at Ravenhill)
- 1924-25 Queen's University 14-3 Instonians (at Ravenhill)
- 1925-26 Collegians 11-3 Queen's University (at Ravenhill)
- 1926-27 Instonians 8-3 NIFC (after extra time)
- 1927-28 Instonians 3-0 NIFC
- 1928-29 Instonians 23-13 NIFC

=== 1930s ===
- 1929-30 NIFC 6-4 Queen's University
- 1930-31 Instonians 7-3 Collegians
- 1931-32 Queen's University 10-3 Collegians
- 1932-33 Queen's University 18-6 Malone
- 1933-34 Instonians 11-6 Civil Service
- 1934-35 NIFC 15-0 Queen's University
- 1935-36 Queen's University 11-0 NIFC (Replay – Game 1: 0-0)
- 1936-37 Queen's University 5-0 Collegians
- 1937-38 Instonians 11-6 NIFC
- 1938-39 NIFC 20-0 Malone

=== 1940s ===
- 1939-1945 Not Played
- 1945-46 Instonians 6-0 NIFC
- 1946-47 Queen's University 16-11 Collegians
- 1947-48 Instonians 12-10 C.I.Y.M.S.
- 1948-49 Instonians 13-9 Queen's University

=== 1950s ===
- 1949-50 Instonians 11-0 Malone
- 1950-51 Queen's University 15-0 NIFC
- 1951-52 Collegians 8-3 Queen's University
- 1952-53 C.I.Y.M.S. 9-6 Collegians
- 1953-54 Instonians 6-0 Queen's University
- 1954-55 NIFC 17-3 Queen's University
- 1955-56 Instonians 6-3 C.I.Y.M.S.
- 1956-57 Instonians 6-3 Ballymena
- 1957-58 Instonians 3-0 Ballymena
- 1958-59 Queen's University beat C.I.Y.M.S.

=== 1960s ===
- 1959-60 Queen's University 14-3 Instonians
- 1960-61 Collegians 6-3 Ballymena
- 1961-62 Collegians 8-0 Queen's University
- 1962-63 Ballymena 8-0 Collegians
- 1963-64 Dungannon 6-0 C.I.Y.M.S.
- 1964-65 Instonians 9-6 Malone
- 1965-66 C.I.Y.M.S. 29-6 Queen's University
- 1966-67 C.I.Y.M.S. 3-0 Dungannon
- 1967-68 Dungannon 12-6 Instonians
- 1968-69 NIFC 23-11 Dungannon

=== 1970s ===
- 1969-70 Ballymena beat C.I.Y.M.S.
- 1970-71 Malone 6-3 NIFC
- 1971-72 C.I.Y.M.S. 22-18 Ballymena
- 1972-73 NIFC 25-12 Malone
- 1973-74 C.I.Y.M.S. 16-6 Bangor
- 1974-75 Ballymena 13-3 C.I.Y.M.S.
- 1975-76 Dungannon 12-9 Instonians
- 1976-77 Ballymena 14-4 NIFC
- 1977-78 C.I.Y.M.S. 14-12 Ballymena
- 1978-79 Instonians 9-6 NIFC

=== 1980s ===
- 1979-80 Bangor 10-6 Instonians
- 1980-81 Queen's University 16-12 Collegians
- 1981-82 Bangor 26-7 Carrickfergus
- 1982-83 Collegians 11-6 City of Derry
- 1983-84 Malone 19-12 NIFC
- 1984-85 Ards 19-7 Instonians
- 1985-86 Bangor beat Malone
- 1986-87 Ards beat Bangor
- 1987-88 Malone beat Bangor
- 1988-89 Ballymena beat Bangor

=== 1990s ===
- 1989-90 Ballymena 17-9 Malone
- 1990-91 Ballymena 13-0 Bangor
- 1991-92 Malone 13-3 NIFC
- 1992-93 Dungannon 20-18 Ballymena
- 1993-94 Dungannon 14-10 Instonians
- 1994-95 Dungannon 21-16 Instonians
- 1995-96 Dungannon 22-10 Malone
- 1996-97 Ballymena 20-13 Malone
- 1997-98 Dungannon beat Malone
- 1998-99 Instonians beat Malone

=== 2000s ===
- 1999-2000 City of Derry beat Dungannon
- 2000-01 Belfast Harlequins 41-12 Dungannon
- 2001-02 Dungannon 32-3 Ballynahinch
- 2002-03 Ballymena 44-3 Dungannon
- 2003-04 Ballymena 11-3 Ballynahinch
- 2004-05 Ballymena 22-20 Belfast Harlequins
- 2005-06 Belfast Harlequins 36-9 Malone
- 2006-07 Dungannon 27-10 Belfast Harlequins
- 2007-08 Belfast Harlequins 22-17 Ballymena
- 2008-09 Ballynahinch 19-0 Ballymena

=== 2010s ===
- 2009-10 Queen's University 37-0 Malone
- 2010-11 Dungannon 25-0 City of Derry
- 2011-12 Ballymena 17-11 Banbridge
- 2012-13 Ballymena 25-6 Rainey Old Boys
- 2013-14 Queen's University 16-10 Ballynahinch
- 2014-15 Ballynahinch 17-10 Malone
- 2015-16 Ballynahinch 19-10 Ballymena
- 2016-17 Ballynahinch 27-10 Dungannnon
- 2017-18 Armagh 17-13 Ballymena
- 2018-19 Armagh 9-7 Ballymena

=== 2020s ===
- 2019-20 Armagh 38-34 Ballynahinch
- 2020-21 Not played due to COVID-19 pandemic
- 2021-22 Queen's University 40-22 City of Armagh
- 2022-23 Ballynahinch 32-15 Queen's University
- 2023-24 Instonians 36-26 Queen's University
- 2024-25 Ballynahinch 50-3 Dungannon
- 2025-26 Ballynahinch 19-14 Instonians

== See also ==
- Connacht Senior Cup
- Leinster Senior Cup
- Munster Senior Cup
