= Dungannon RFC =

Irish rugby union club, based in Dungannon, Co. Tyrone

(Northern Ireland) Dungannon FC
- Full name: Dungannon Football Club 1873
- Union: (Ireland) IRFU
- Branch: Ulster
- Nickname: Gannon
- Founded: 1873; 153 years ago
- Ground(s): Stevenson Park, Dungannon (Capacity: 2,500)
- Chairman: Richard Weir
- President: Shane Kennedy
- Coach(es): Jonny Gillespie, Jonny Graham and Jonny Patton
- Captain: James McMahon
- League: [[All-Ireland League (rugby union)#Division 2A| All Ireland League Div. 2A]
- 2024–25: 2nd - Promoted
Team kit

Official website
- www.dungannonrugby.co.uk

Dungannon FC (Dungannon Football Club) is a rugby union club from Dungannon, County Tyrone, Northern Ireland, playing in Division 2A of the All-Ireland League.

== History ==
The 5th Earl of Ranfurly, who was President of Dungannon Football Club for 24 years and Patron for a further 37 years, was Governor of New Zealand from 1897 to 1904. He brought his love of rugby to New Zealand and gave his name to the most prestigious rugby trophy in the Southern Hemisphere, The Ranfurly Shield. The Club played junior rugby for most of the first half of the 20th century before returning to the senior ranks in 1954 under the captaincy of Roy Saunders the Club's first Honorary Life Member.

As a result of winning the AIB All Ireland League playoffs in 2000–2001 Dungannon has now won every available domestic competition. The AIB League, The All Ireland Floodlit Cup, The Stevenson Shield (Ulster Senior League), The Ulster Senior Cup (a record five times in the 1990s), The Ulster Towns Cup ( a record eighteen times), The Ulster Junior Cup and The Forster Cup.

In 1995 the Club took a bold step in appointing Willie Anderson as its Director of Rugby. It was one of the first Clubs in Ireland to make such a move in a desire to further develop and promote rugby football in the area. The Club has supported the All Ireland League since its inception, although they had to fight their way into it by way of the playoffs after year one. Since then Dungannon have always played in either division One or Division Two. After demotion in 1998 the Club immediately regrouped and bounced back to Division One as winners of Division Two in 1999. Dungannon Rugby Club achieved its most historic victory in May 2001 by winning the AIB All Ireland League Final.

Stevenson Park was purchased in 1969 and has been gradually improved into one of the finest arenas for playing and viewing rugby in Ireland. In 1999/2000 the Club completed the first phase of the development of its facilities by totally renovating and extending the changing facilities. Incorporating new administration offices, new heating and building a new car park. The new development which cost £500,000 was funded by a National Lottery Grant and by the generous donation of members.

== Honours ==
- All-Ireland League: 1
  - 2000-01
- Ulster Senior Cup: 10
  - 1963–64, 1967–68, 1975–76, 1992–93, 1993–94, 1994–95, 1997–98, 2001–02, 2006–07, 2010-11
- Ulster Senior League: 5 (1 shared)
  - 1960–61, 1964–65, 1967–68, 1990–91, 2005–06 (shared)
- Ulster Towns Cup: 20 (1 shared)
  - 1883–84, 1885–86 (shared), 1893–94, 1894–95, 1895–96, 1898–99, 1901–02, 1902–03, 1904–05, 1906–07, 1911–12, 1947–48, 1948–49, 1949–50, †1959-60, †1960-61, †1964-65, †1965-66, †1995-96, †1998-99
- Ulster Junior Cup: 9
  - 1895–96, †1896-97, 1898–99, †1899-1900, 1911–12, †1995-96, †1996-97, †1998-99, †2002-03

† Won by 2nd XV

== Notable players ==
(British & Irish Lions) British and Irish Lions

- Jeremy Davidson
- Stephen Ferris
- Tyrone Howe
- Stewart McKinney

Ireland

- Willie Anderson
- Jonny Bell
- Ryan Caldwell
- Kieran Campbell
- Allen Clarke
- Jeremy Davidson
- Stephen Ferris
- Declan Fitzpatrick
- Justin Fitzpatrick
- Craig Gilroy
- Tyrone Howe
- David Humphreys
- Paddy Jackson
- Paddy Johns
- Mark McCall
- J. J. McCoy
- Stuart McCloskey
- Stewart McKinney

Ulster

- Chris Cochrane
- Bryn Cunningham
- Peter Nelson
- David Pollock

Canada

- Peter Nelson

New Zealand

- Angus Ta'avao
