= Ballynahinch RFC =

Irish rugby union club, based in Ballynahinch, County Down

(Northern Ireland) Ballynahinch RFC
- Full name: Ballynahinch Rugby Football Club
- Union: (Ireland) IRFU
- Branch: Ulster
- Nickname: Hinch
- Founded: 1954; 72 years ago
- Ground(s): Ballymacarn Park, 6 Mountview Road, Ballynahinch
- Chairman: James Kirk
- President: David George
- Director of Rugby: Tim Morton
- Coach: Adam Craig
- League: All-Ireland League, 1A
- 2024–25: 5th.
Team kit

Official website
- www.hinchrfc.co.uk

Ballynahinch Rugby Club is an Irish rugby union club based in the County Down town of Ballynahinch. Founded in 1954, the club is affiliated to the Ulster Branch of the Irish Rugby Football Union.

The first team plays Senior rugby union in the All-Ireland League, Division 1A and the club also fields six Junior standard adult teams. Youth teams (male and female) compete at under-16, under-14, under-12 and the mini-rugby levels.

== History ==
At a meeting in the local Royal British Legion Hall in April 1954, a dozen people attended and agreed that a club should be formed. An application was made to enter the Junior League for the 1954–55 season. The application was accepted by the Ulster Branch.

Membership for the club grew quickly with players coming from all over County Down, Belfast and the Mournes region. It was at this point that the Club started to gather pace and a pitch was required due to the growing player base. A pitch was rented from a local farmer at Ballykine. Even though the grounds had no changing rooms or showers it did the job of providing Ballynahinch club with a home.

In 1964 the club enjoyed success with the winning of the Ulster Towns Cup. The Ulster Junior Cup was won consecutively in 1966 and 1967.

An increasing player and fan base meant that proper grounds were required. In August 1970, at the cost of £6,500, the current playing facilities at Ballymacarn Park were purchased. The 16-acre (6.5 ha) site soon had its own clubhouse in front of the 1st XV pitch.

It was from this point that the club grew to field 7 teams. The 1st XV went on to be one of the top teams in Ulster Junior League rugby for the next 10 years.

== Senior status ==
In the early 1990s, Irish rugby underwent changes with the introduction of professionalism. Ballynahinch for many years had campaigned for senior status. An open promotion-and-relegation system was introduced and in 1995 Ballynahinch achieved their goal.

As a senior club, they won promotion from All Ireland League Division 4 to Division 3 in 1996–97 season. The following season a further promotion was gained to All Ireland Division 2.

The 1998–99 season saw the successful run come to an end when they got relegated back to Division 3, only to go back up again after the 2000–01 season. Mid-table finishes were achieved in Division 2 until the 2005–06 when the club was once again relegated to Division 3.

Ballynahinch played Division 2 rugby again in the 2007–08 season, with another mid-table finish after winning promotion in the 2006–07 campaign.

In 2008–09 the club had its most successful season, winning the AIB All-Ireland Cup by beating Division 1 team Cork Constitution in the final, Ulster Senior League, Ulster Senior Cup and promotion to Division 1 of the AIB League.

== Honours ==
- All-Ireland Cup
  - 2008–09
- Ulster Senior Cup: 7
  - 2008–09, 2014–15, 2015–16, 2016–17, 2022-23, 2024-25, 2025-26
- Ulster Senior League: 8
  - 2008–09, 2012–13, 2013–14, 2014–15, 2018-19, 2021-22, 2022-23, 2023-24
- Ulster Towns Cup: 5
  - 1963–64, 1986–87, 1987–88, 1989–90, 1994–95, †2014-2015, †2016–17, ∆†2019-2020
- Ulster Junior Cup: 8
  - 1965–66, 1966–67, 1987–88, 1991–92, 1994–95, †2010–11, †2013–14, †2016–17, †2017–18

† Won by 2nd XV ∆ Shared due to COVID-19 Pandemic
