= City of Armagh RFC =

Irish rugby union club, based in Armagh, Northern Ireland

(Northern Ireland) City of Armagh
- Full name: City of Armagh Rugby Football Club
- Union: (Ireland) IRFU; Ulster
- Founded: 1875; 151 years ago
- Ground(s): Palace Grounds, Armagh
- Chairman: John Callaghan
- President: Tim Taylor
- Director of Rugby: Paul Johnston
- Coach: Chris Parker
- Captain: Nigel Simpson
- League: All-Ireland League, Div. 1A
- 2024–25: 9th. (Relegated)
Team kit

Official website
- cityofarmaghrfc.com

The City of Armagh Rugby Football Club is a rugby union club based in Armagh, Northern Ireland, playing in Division 1A of the All-Ireland League.

== Honours ==
- Ulster Senior League: 3
  - 2016-17, 2017-18, 2024-25
- Ulster Senior Cup: 3
  - 2017-18, 2018-19, 2019-20
