= All-Ireland League (rugby union) =

Irish rugby union competition

- Current season or competition: 2026–27 All-Ireland League (rugby union)
- Sport: Rugby union
- Instituted: 1990; 36 years ago
- Number of teams: 50
- Nations: Ireland; Northern Ireland
- Holders: St Mary's College (3rd title) (2025–26)
- Most titles: Shannon (9 titles)
- Website: irishrugby.ie/all-ireland-leagues

The All-Ireland League (AIL), known for sponsorship reasons as the Energia All-Ireland League, is the national league system for the 50 senior mens rugby union clubs in Ireland, covering both the Republic of Ireland and Northern Ireland. The league was inaugurated in the 1990–91 season.

The league is the second-highest level of rugby union in Ireland, and the highest amateur level. Professional teams representing the four provinces of Ireland play in the United Rugby Championship.

Division 1 sides may field no more than two professional players in their matchday sides, and only one may be a forward. Division 2 sides may not field professional players. Foreign professional players may not play in the League. Cork Constitution, the inaugural winners, are the only club to have retained top division status since the inception of the league.

== Format ==
The League consists of five divisions of 10 teams each playing a double round-robin competition using the standard Rugby union bonus points system. The season runs from mid-September until mid-April, with an approximately four-week break in matches from mid-December to early-January. At the completion of the league phase the top 4 teams in Division 1A qualify for the play-off semi-finals, with the two winners meeting in the final.

The 10th placed teams in Divisions 1A, 1B and 2A are relegated to Divisions 1B, 2A and 2B respectively while the winners of Divisions 1B, 2A and 2B are promoted up one division. From 2026–27 Division 2B is divided into North and South sections with the winners of each section playing-off for the Division 2B title. The 9th placed team in Division 1A along with the 2nd to 4th placed teams in Division 1B enter a play-off competition with the winner playing in Division 1A the following season. This same play-off competition also applies to Division 1B/2A. The 9th place team in 2A along with the loser of the 2B play-off and runners-up in 2BN and 2BS enter a play-off competition with the winner playing in Division 2A the following season.

The 10th placed teams in each section of Division 2B play-off and the loser is relegated from the league to their respective provincial qualifying league and are replaced by the winner of the All-Ireland Provincial League Championship. The winner of the play-off plays the runner-up of the All-Ireland Provincial League Championship with the winner playing in Division 2B the following season.

=== All-Ireland Provincial League Championship ===
The All-Ireland Provincial League Championship is contested by the winners of the four provincial qualifying leagues in Connacht, Leinster, Munster and Ulster. They are drawn to play in two semi-finals with the winners meeting in the final, where the winner will play in Division 2B of the AIL for the following season. The runner-up plays against the winner of the Division 2B relegation play-off and the winner of this play-off will also play in Division 2B of the AIL the following season.

== History ==
Prior to 1990, there was no national league in Ireland, and each of the four provincial unions had its own cup and league tournament. The IRFU and clubs began original discussions for a national league in 1984, before proposals were voted down. After a poor performance at the inaugural Rugby World Cup again raised the issue of playing standards, and after almost five years of discussion and consultation with clubs, the All-Ireland League (AIL) was introduced in 1990 with 19 teams across two divisions. The AIL was expanded to four divisions in 1993–94, with small variations in the numbers of teams per division in subsequent seasons.

In 2000–01 the league was restructured to three divisions, each with 16 teams. After the 1995 introduction of professionalism in rugby union, the IRFU increased the importance of the provinces, which from 2002 participated in the Celtic League (now the United Rugby Championship) as full-time teams rather than ad hoc selections of club players. Therefore, the best Irish players no longer played in the AIL. In 2004 the IRFU proposed scrapping the All-Ireland League and reintroducing a provincial league system in 2005–06 which would act as qualifiers for a curtailed three-division AIL structure in the second half of the season, but this model did not receive the support of clubs or rugby pundits. In 2007 the IRFU agreed that the structure of the All-Ireland League would remain as three divisions with 16 clubs each for seasons 2008–09 and 2009–10. In 2009–10, division 1 was split into 1A and 1B with eight teams in each as a trial and then continued in season 2010–11. In 2011–12 division 1A and 1B had 10 clubs each and divisions 2 and 3 were reformatted as divisions 2A and 2B with 16 clubs in each division.

== Previous winners ==
=== 1990/91 – 1996/97 ===
From 1991 to 1997 the team finishing top of Division 1 were crowned league champions.

Season	Title No.	(gold) Champions	Pts	(silver) Runners-up	Pts
1990–91	1st	Cork Constitution	14pts	Garryowen	12pts
1991–92	1st	Garryowen	14pts	Shannon	12pts
1992–93	1st	Young Munster	13pts	Cork Constitution	12pts
1993–94	2nd	Garryowen	16pts	Cork Constitution	14pts
1994–95	1st	Shannon	20pts	Blackrock College	14pts
1995–96	2nd	Shannon*	16pts	Garryowen	16pts
1996–97	3rd	Shannon	24pts	Lansdowne	18pts

* Shannon finished ahead of Garryowen on Points Difference

=== 1997/98 – 2010/11 ===
From 1998 to 2011 the league title was decided via play-offs, with 4 teams qualifying for the semi-finals and the winners of the Final were crowned league champions. From 1998 to 2009 the top 4 teams from Division 1 qualified for the semi-finals while for 2010 and 2011 the top 3 teams from Division 1A along with the winner of Division 1B qualified for the semi-finals.

Season	Title No.	(gold) Champions	Result	(silver) Runners-up	Table toppers	Finishing position of Champions
1997–98	4th	Shannon	15-9	Garryowen	Shannon (24pts)	1st
1998–99	2nd	Cork Constitution	14-11 (aet)	Garryowen	Garryowen (16pts)	2nd
1999–00	1st	St Mary's College	25-22	Lansdowne	St Mary's College (37pts)	1st
2000–01	1st	Dungannon	46-12	Cork Constitution	Cork Constitution (57pts)	3rd
2001–02	5th	Shannon	21-17	Cork Constitution	Cork Constitution (52pts)	2nd
2002–03	1st	Ballymena	28-18	Clontarf	Clontarf (61pts)	3rd
2003–04	6th	Shannon	22-16	Cork Constitution	Cork Constitution (51pts)	2nd
2004–05	7th	Shannon	25-20	Belfast Harlequins	Shannon (51pts)	1st
2005–06	8th	Shannon	30-3	Clontarf	Garryowen (61pts)	4th
2006–07	3rd	Garryowen	16-15	Cork Constitution	Cork Constitution (60pts)	3rd
2007–08	3rd	Cork Constitution	18-8	Garryowen	Cork Constitution (58pts)	1st
2008–09	9th	Shannon*	19-19 (aet)	Clontarf	Cork Constitution (52pts)	2nd
2009–10	4th	Cork Constitution	17-10 (aet)	St Mary's College	Cork Constitution (46pts)	1st
2010–11	1st	Old Belvedere	20-17	Cork Constitution	Cork Constitution (47pts)	2nd

* Shannon won on first try rule

=== 2011/12 – 2013/14 ===
From 2012 to 2014 the team finishing top of Division 1A were crowned league champions.

Season	Title No.	(gold) Champions	Pts	(silver) Runners-up	Pts
2011–12	2nd	St Mary's College	66pts	Clontarf	64pts
2012–13	1st	Lansdowne	68pts	Garryowen	50pts
2013–14	1st	Clontarf	64pts	Old Belvedere	63pts

=== 2014/15 – Present ===
Since 2015 the top 4 clubs in Division 1A qualify for the league semi-finals with the winner of the final crowned league champions.

Season	Title No.	(gold) Champions	Result	(silver) Runners-up	Table toppers	Finishing position of Champions
2014–15	2nd	Lansdowne	18-17	Clontarf	Lansdowne (65pts)	1st
2015–16	2nd	Clontarf	28-25	Cork Constitution	Clontarf (64pts)	1st
2016–17	5th	Cork Constitution	25-21	Clontarf	Lansdowne (58pts)	4th
2017–18	3rd	Lansdowne	19-17	Cork Constitution	Lansdowne (71pts)	1st
2018–19	6th	Cork Constitution	28-13	Clontarf	Cork Constitution (73pts)	1st
2019–20; 2020–21	cancelled due to the COVID-19 pandemic					
2021–22	3rd	Clontarf	29-23	Terenure College	Clontarf (77pts)	1st
2022–23	1st	Terenure College	50-24	Clontarf	Clontarf (76pts)	2nd
2023–24	7th	Cork Constitution	33-22	Terenure College	Terenure College (70pts)	2nd
2024–25	4th	Clontarf	22-21	Cork Constitution	Clontarf (66pts)	1st
2025–26	3rd	St Mary's College	46-31	Clontarf	St Mary's College (65pts)	1st

== Roll of honour ==
Team	Wins	Runners up	Winning seasons	Runners-up
Shannon	9	1	1994–95, 1995–96, 1996–97, 1997–98, 2001–02, 2003–04, 2004–05, 2005–06, 2008–09	1991–92
Cork Constitution	7	10	1990–91, 1998-99, 2007–08, 2009–10, 2016–17, 2018–19, 2023–24	1992–93, 1993–94, 2000–01, 2001–02, 2003–04, 2006–07, 2010–11, 2015–16, 2017–18, 2024–25
Clontarf	4	9	2013–14, 2015–16, 2021–22, 2024–25	2002–03, 2005–06, 2008–09, 2011–12, 2014–15, 2016–17, 2018–19, 2022–23, 2025–26
Garryowen	3	6	1991–92, 1993–94, 2006–07	1990–91, 1995–96, 1997–98, 1998–99, 2007–08, 2012–13
Lansdowne	3	2	2012–13, 2014–15, 2017–18	1996–97, 1999–00
St Mary's College	3	1	1999–00, 2011–12, 2025–26	2009–10
Terenure College	1	2	2022–23	2021–22, 2023–24
Old Belvedere	1	1	2010–11	2013–14
Young Munster	1	0	1992–93	—
Ballymena	1	0	2002–03	—
Dungannon	1	0	2000–01	—
Blackrock College	0	1	—	1994–95
Belfast Harlequins	0	1	—	2004–05

== Teams (2026–27) ==
=== Division 1A ===
Team	Location	Stadium	Capacity
Ballynahinch	Ballynahinch	Ballymacarn Park	1,000
Clontarf	Dublin (Clontarf)	Castle Avenue	3,200
Cork Constitution	Cork (Ballintemple)	Temple Hill	1,000
Lansdowne	Dublin (Ballsbridge)	Aviva Stadium (Back Pitch)	1,000
Old Belvedere	Dublin (Ballsbridge)	Ollie Campbell Park	1,000
Old Wesley	Dublin (Donnybrook)	Donnybrook Stadium	7,000
St Mary's College	Dublin (Templeogue)	Templeville Road	4,000
Terenure College	Dublin (Terenure)	Lakelands Park	3,000
UCD	Dublin (Belfield)	UCD Bowl	3,000
Young Munster	Limerick (Rosbrien)	Tom Clifford Park	1,000

Location of teams in the 2026–27 All-Ireland League Division 1A
Location of Dublin teams in the 2026–27 All-Ireland League Division 1A

=== Division 1B ===
Team	Location	Stadium	Capacity
Blackrock College	Dublin (Blackrock)	Stradbrook Road	4,000
City of Armagh	Armagh	Palace Grounds	1,000
Dublin University	Dublin	College Park	200
Garryowen	Limerick (Dooradoyle)	Dooradoyle	1,500
Highfield	Cork (Bishopstown)	Woodleigh Park	4,000
Instonians	Belfast	Shawsbridge Sports Complex	1,000
MU Barnhall	Leixlip	Parsonstown	1,000
Naas	Naas	Forenaughts	3,000
Nenagh Ormond	Nenagh	New Ormond Park	1,000
UCC	Cork (Mardyke)	Mardyke Arena	5,000

Location of teams in the 2026–27 All-Ireland League Division 1B
Location of Dublin teams in the 2026–27 All-Ireland League Division 1B

=== Division 2A ===
Team	Location	Stadium	Capacity
Ballymena	Ballymena	Eaton Park	1,000
Cashel	Cashel	Spafield	2,500
Dungannon	Dungannon	Stevenson Park	1,000
Galway Corinthians	Galway (Castlegar)	Corinthian Park	1,000
Galwegians	Galway (Renmore)	Crowley Park	2,000
Greystones	Greystones	Dr Hickey Park	1,000
Queen's University	Belfast	Dub Lane	1,000
Shannon	Limerick	Thomond Park	25,100
UL Bohemians	Limerick (UL)	UL4G	1,000
Wanderers	Dublin (Ballsbridge)	Merrion Road	1,000

Location of teams in the 2026–27 All-Ireland League Division 2A

=== Division 2B (North) ===
Team	Location	Stadium	Capacity
Ballyclare	Ballyclare	The Cloughan	1,000
Banbridge	Banbridge	Rifle Park	1,000
Clogher Valley	Fivemiletown	The Cran	1,000
Enniskillen	Enniskillen	Ardgart	1,000
Malahide	Malahide	Estuary Road	1,000
Malone	Belfast	Gibson Park	1,000
Navan	Navan	Balreask Old	4,000
Rainey	Magherafelt	Hatrick Park	1,000
Skerries	Skerries	Holmpatrick	1,000
Sligo	Strandhill	Hamilton Park	1,000

Location of teams in the 2026–27 All-Ireland League Division 2BN

=== Division 2B (South) ===
Team	Location	Stadium	Capacity
Bective Rangers	Dublin (Donnybrook)	Donnybrook Stadium	6,000
Bruff	Bruff	Kilballyowen Park	2,000
Buccaneers	Athlone	Dubarry Park	10,000
Clonmel	Clonmel	Ard Gaoithe	4,000
Dolphin	Cork (Ballyphehane)	Musgrave Park	8,008
Enniscorthy	Enniscorthy	Ross Road	1,000
Midleton	Midleton	Towns Park	400
Monkstown	Dublin (Sandymount)	Sydney Parade	1,000
Old Crescent	Limerick (Rosbrien)	Rosbrien	4,000
Thomond	Limerick (Moyross)	Liam Fitzgerald Park	1,000

Location of teams in the 2026–27 All-Ireland League Division 2BS
Location of Dublin teams in the 2026–27 All-Ireland League Division 2BS

== Sponsorship ==
The All-Ireland League was not sponsored in the initial season, but was sponsored for six years by Insurance Corporation of Ireland. The League was sponsored by Allied Irish Banks from 1998 to 2010, Ulster Bank from 2010 to 2019, 2018/19 season was not sponsored and Energia since the 2019–20 season.

Season	Sponsor
1990–1991	No Sponsor
1991–1998	Insurance Corporation of Ireland
1998–2010	Allied Irish Banks
2010–2019	Ulster Bank
2018–2019	No Sponsor
2019–Present	Energia

== See also ==
- All-Ireland Cup
- Connacht Senior Cup
- Leinster Senior Cup
- Munster Senior Cup
- Ulster Senior Cup
- United Rugby Championship
