= 2023–24 Ulster Rugby season =

Ulster Rugby
- 2023–24 season
- Head Coach: Dan McFarland (until 21 February 2024); Dan Soper (interim); Richie Murphy
- Operations Director: Bryn Cunningham
- Captain: Iain Henderson
- United Rugby Championship: 6th in table Quarter-finals
- Champions Cup Challenge Cup: 5th in Pool B Quarter-finals
- Top try scorer: League: Jacob Stockdale (9); All: Nick Timoney (12)
- Top points scorer: League: John Cooney (111); All: John Cooney (141)
Home colours	Away colours	Third colours

The 2023–24 season was Ulster Rugby's 30th season since the advent of professionalism in rugby union. They competed in the United Rugby Championship the European Rugby Champions Cup, and the EPCR Challenge Cup. It was Dan McFarland's sixth season as head coach. Despite some good results, including a home win against Racing 92 in the Champions Cup and an away win against Leinster in the URC, Ulster slipped back in the league, and poor performances against Bath, Harlequins and Toulouse dumped them out of the Champions Cup. After an away defeat in the URC against Ospreys in February, McFarland left his position, replaced by former Ireland under-20 head coach Richie Murphy. CEO Jonny Petrie also left, replaced on an interim basis by Hugh McCaughey. Murphy oversaw two away losses in South Africa and a quarter-final exit in the Challenge Cup, but form improved in the league, with four straight wins, including a home win against Leinster, and a losing bonus point away to Munster secured a quarter-final place, losing away to a full-strength Leinster side, and qualification for next season's Champions Cup.

New signings this season included South African prop Steven Kitshoff and Zimbabwean flanker Dave Ewers, both of whom left at the end of the season. Prop Scott Wilson, hooker Zac Solomon, lock Joe Hopes, and flankers Reuben Crothers and Lorcan McLaughlin made their debuts from the academy. Centre Ben Carson and fullback Shea O'Brien also made their debuts. Scrum-half John Cooney was Ulster's leading scorer with 141 points in all competitions, and was named Ulster's supporters club player of the year for the third time, and selected in the URC team of the season for the fifth time. Number eight Nick Timoney was leading try scorer with 12. Flanker David McCann was named Ulster's player of the year and rugby writers' player of the year. Lock Harry Sheridan was young player of the year.

Ulster Women won their first interpro since 2012, finishing third in the IRFU Women's Interprovincial Series. Back rower Brittany Hogan was Ulster's women's player of the year, and fellow back rower Sophie Barrett was young women's player of the year.

In the All-Ireland League, Instonians topped Division 2B and were promoted for the second season running. Clogher Valley topped Division 2B and were promoted in their first season in senior rugby. Malone were relegated from Division 2A, Belfast Harlequins were relegated from Division 2B, and Bangor dropped into junior rugby after being relegated from Division 2B. Ulster junior champions Ballyclare were promoted to senior level after winning the provincial playoffs.

== Pre-season ==
Ulster renewed their sponsorship deal with Kingspan in July 2023 for the coming season, despite criticism of the firm emerging from the Grenfell Tower Inquiry. Their stadium naming deal would continue until the end of the season. In January 2024 it was announced that Kingspan would remain as Ulster's principal sponsor until the end of the 2024–25 season, to give the team time to find a new sponsor.

In May 2023 Ulster submitted a planning application to install a 3G artificial turf pitch at Ravenhill. Planning permission was granted by Belfast City Council in late June, and work began in late July.

== Men's season ==
=== Personnel changes ===
Signings announced for next season include South African prop Steven Kitshoff, from the Stormers, flanker Dave Ewers, from Exeter Chiefs, and former Munster prop James French. Five academy players joined the senior squad on development contracts: lock Harry Sheridan, scrum-half Conor McKee, hooker James McCormick, back row forward Reuben Crothers and centre Ben Carson. After a successful trial in pre-season, Clontarf tighthead prop Ben Griffin was signed on a development contract in August. Former Leinster, Connacht and Jersey Reds prop Greg McGrath joined as injury cover in October.

Flanker Jordi Murphy and out-half Ian Madigan retired. Lock Frank Bradshaw Ryan left for Montauban. Wings Rob Lyttle and Craig Gilroy announced they would leave at the end of the season. Hooker Declan Moore and scrum-half Michael McDonald moved to Connacht on a season-long loan. Also departing were Sam Carter, Duane Vermeulen, Gareth Milasinovich, Jeffery Toomaga-Allen and Rory Sutherland.

Eleven players joined the academy: props Cameron Doak, Jack Boal and Jacob Boyd; hookers Zac Solomon and Henry Walker; lock Charlie Irvine; back rowers Josh Stevens and Tom Brigg; and outside backs Ethan Graham, Lukas Kenny and Ben McFarlane.

Iain Henderson's central contract with the IRFU was due to expire after the 2023 Rugby World Cup, and there was speculation that he might move abroad. He signed an extension in 2023, keeping him with Ulster and Ireland for a further two seasons.

Centre Angus Curtis retired in mid-season on medical advice after a series of concussions.

=== U20 World Championship ===
Four Ulster players featured for Ireland in the 2023 World Rugby U20 Championship: locks Charlie Irvine and Joe Hopes, flanker James McNabney and fullback Rory Telfer. Ireland made the final, which they lost 50–14 to France.

=== World Cup ===
Seven Ulster players were named in Andy Farrell's initial 42-man Ireland squad, to be reduced to 33 for the Rugby World Cup: locks Iain Henderson and Kieran Treadwell, hookers Rob Herring and Tom Stewart, prop Tom O'Toole, centre Stuart McCloskey and wing Jacob Stockdale.

In Ireland's three warm-up matches, Henderson captained the side against Italy and Samoa; Herring started against Italy and appeared off the bench against England and Samoa, scoring two tries; McCloskey started against Italy and Samoa, and scored a try; Stockdale started against Italy and Samoa and assisted a try; O'Toole started against Italy and came off the bench against Samoa; Stewart made his international debut from the bench against Italy, and his first international start against Samoa. Henderson, Herring, O'Toole and McCloskey were named in the Ireland World Cup squad.

In the World Cup pool stage, Ireland went unbeaten, topped Pool B, and qualified for the quarter-finals. Rob Herring started and scored a try against Romania, and came off the bench against Tonga, scoring another try; Tom O'Toole came off the bench against Romania; Iain Henderson came off the bench against Romania, Tonga and South Africa, and started and scored a try against Scotland; and Stuart McCloskey came off the bench against Scotland. Henderson started in the quarter-final defeat to New Zealand.

=== Friendlies ===
Ulster's first pre-season friendly was against Leinster at Navan R.F.C. on 22 September, which Leinster won 38–21. They played a second friendly against Benetton in Treviso, which the hosts won 24–22. They faced Glasgow Warriors at GAA ground Breffni Park in Cavan on 7 October, winning 19–14.

=== Domestic season: first block ===
Ulster opened the URC season with a close away win against Zebre Parma, with Tom Stewart and Jacob Stockdale scoring two tries each, and flanker Dave Ewers and props Greg McGrath and James French making their Ulster debuts. The following week they won at home against the Bulls, with Ireland international prop Tom O'Toole playing 80 minutes and winning Player of the Match. A spate of injuries saw an experimental side go to Connacht, and flanker Reuben Crothers, centre Ben Carson and academy lock Joe Hopes made their senior debuts in a narrow defeat. The following weekend, Ulster beat Munster at home, with Rob Herring becoming Ulster's most capped player, and academy prop Scott Wilson making his senior debut. On 17 November Ulster defeated the Lions at home in rainy conditions. Prop Marty Moore made his first appearance since sustaining a serious knee injury in January, and flanker Lorcan McLoughlin made his first senior appearance, both from the bench.

There followed three straight defeats, the first away to Glasgow Warriors. Billy Burns made his 100th appearance for the province. Academy back rower James McNabney made his senior debut at number eight, and academy hooker Zac Solomon and new signing Steven Kitshoff made their first appearances from the bench. Nathan Doak unexpectedly made his 50th Ulster appearance, being named on the bench at the last minute following the withdrawal of Jake Flannery, then playing most of the game at out-half after Billy Burns' head injury. The following week Steven Kitshoff made his first home appearance and Tom Stewart scored two tries as Ulster gained two losing bonus points at home to Edinburgh. They then started their Champions Cup campaign with an away defeat against Bath.

Fortunes changed with three straight wins, the first a bonus point victory in the Champions Cup against Racing 92, followed by two Interpros in the URC, each won by a single point. First they beat Connacht, at home, with Kieran Treadwell making his 150th appearance for the province. Then, on New Year's Day, a masterful display of attacking kicking by Billy Burns and two tries by Nick Timoney saw Ulster overcome league leaders Leinster in Dublin.

The first block was finished with two heavy defeats in the Champions Cup, at home against Toulouse and away against Harlequins, meaning Ulster failed to qualify for the knockout rounds and were entered into the Challenge Cup round of 16. After an away defeat against the Ospreys in the URC, Dan McFarland left as head coach. Assistant coach Dan Soper would take charge until after the Six Nations Under 20s Championship, after which Ireland under-20 coach Richie Murphy would take over until the end of the season.

=== Six Nations break ===
The Ireland squad for the 2024 Six Nations Championship included six Ulster players: Tom Stewart, Tom O'Toole, Iain Henderson, Nick Timoney, Stuart McCloskey and Jacob Stockdale. No Ulster players were selected for the opening match against France. The following week against Italy, McCloskey started, and Henderson and O'Toole came off the bench. McCloskey came off the bench in the home win against Wales in round three.

During the Six Nations rest week, Dan Soper oversaw a 49-26 Ulster home win against Dragons, in which Michael Lowry and David McCann scored two tries each. The Six Nations resumed with Ireland narrowly losing away to England, in which Iain Henderson featured from the bench.

=== Domestic season: second block ===
Interim coach Richie Murphy took charge ahead of Ulster's two-week trip to South Africa to play the Sharks and Stormers. He was joined by Ireland scrum coach John Fogarty on a part-time basis (Dan McFarland had previously coached the scrum for Ulster).

After Ulster lost to the Sharks, losing Billy Burns to injury, the departure of Jonny Petrie as Chief Executive was announced by the IRFU. Hugh McCaughey, former Chief Executive of the South Eastern Health and Social Care Trust and a former rugby coach at under-age level, was announced as his interim replacement. With Nathan Doak named at out-half, they then lost narrowly to the Stormers. It was announced that Steven Kitshoff would cut short his stay at Ulster and return to the Stormers at the end of the season. The following week, Ulster won their round of 16 tie against Montpellier in the Challenge Cup, aided by their opponents' poor discipline, being down to 12 players at one point. This earned them a quarter-final against Clermont, which they lost. Kitshoff sustained a season-ending injury, so this was his final match for Ulster. After three straight wins in the URC, over Cardiff, Benetton and Scarlets, Murphy was appointed head coach on a two-year contract. A fourth straight win, at home to Leinster, clinched a quarter final place. A losing bonus point away to table-toppers Munster on the final weekend of the regular season secured sixth place, a quarter-final away to Leinster (which they lost), and a place in next season's Champions Cup.

== Women's season ==
Murray Houston, former head coach of University of Glasgow Women RFC, was appointed head coach of Ulster Women, replacing Neill Alcorn, who had taken up a new post with the IRFU. Assisting him were former Ireland women's internationals Kathryn Dane as contact skills coach, Grace Davitt as backs coach and Amy Davis as technical skills coach, and men's player Eric O'Sullivan as scrum coach.

Ulster Women won their first interprovincial match since December 2012 by defeating Connacht 36–14 in third/fourth place playoff of the Interprovincial Championship.

The second Celtic Challenge featured two Irish teams, the Woldhounds and the Clovers. Ulster players selected for the Wolfhounds were Ella Durkan, Niamh Marley, Kelly McCormill, Sophie Barrett, Keelin Brady, Maebh Clenaghan, India Daley, Brittany Hogan and Fiona Tuite. Sadhbh McGrath was selected for the Clovers. The Wolfhounds topped the table, with the Clovers in third.

== Awards ==
=== Ulster rugby awards ===
The end of season awards were announced online on 12 June. winners were:

==== Men's and boys' awards ====
- Men's player of the year: David McCann
- Personality of the year: Luke Marshall
- Supporters Club player of the year: John Cooney
- Rugby writers' player of the year: David McCann
- Young men's player of the year: Harry Sheridan
- Club Player of the Year: Bradley McNamara, Instonians
- Boys' schools player of the year: Conor Magee, Banbridge Academy
- Boys' youth player of the year: Dylan Fox, Malone

==== Women's and girls' awards ====
- Women's player of the year: Brittany Hogan, Ballynahinch/Old Belvedere
- Young women's player of the year: Sophie Barrett, Enniskillen/Railway Union
- Girls' schools player of the year: Niamh Fulton, Sullivan Upper School
- Girls' youth player of the year: Erin McConalogue, Inishowen

==== Club/community awards ====
- Club of the year: Ballyclare
- Referee of the year: Keane Davison, Omagh
- Ulster Rugby Foundation Community Impact Award – Civil Service
- Dorrington B. Faulkner award (services to rugby: John Carleton, Grosvenor RFC

=== URC awards ===
John Cooney was named at scrum-half in the URC Elite XV.

== Men's personnel ==
=== Staff ===
Position	Name	Nationality
Chief executive officer	Jonny Petrie (to 25 March 2024); Hugh McCaughey (interim)	Scotland; Ireland
Operations director	Bryn Cunningham	Ireland
Head coach	Dan McFarland (to 21 February 2024); Dan Soper (interim); Richie Murphy (from 23 March 2024)	England; New Zealand; Ireland
Assistant coach	Dan Soper	New Zealand
Defence coach	Jonny Bell	Ireland
Forwards coach	Roddy Grant	Scotland
Skills coach	Craig Newby	New Zealand
Scrum coach	John Fogarty (interim)	Ireland
Academy manager	Gavin Hogg	Ireland
Elite performance development officer	Willie Faloon	Ireland
Elite performance development officer	Neil Doak	Ireland

=== Senior squad ===
The below squad reflects the confirmed joiners and leavers for the 2023–24 season. Amendments to the squad will be made as-and-when announcements are confirmed by the province.

==== Players in ====
- (Zimbabwe) Dave Ewers from (England) Exeter Chiefs
- (Ireland) James French (unattached)
- (Ireland) Ben Griffin from (Ireland) Clontarf
- (South Africa) Steven Kitshoff from (South Africa) Stormers
- (Ireland) Greg McGrath from (England) Jersey Reds (short-term injury cover)

==== Promoted from academy ====
- (Ireland) Ben Carson
- (Ireland) Reuben Crothers
- (Ireland) James McCormick
- (Ireland) Conor McKee
- (Ireland) Harry Sheridan

==== Players out ====
- (Ireland) Frank Bradshaw Ryan to (France) Montauban
- (Australia) Sam Carter to (England) Leicester Tigers
- (Ireland) Craig Gilroy released
- (Ireland) Rob Lyttle released
- (Ireland) Ian Madigan retired
- (Australia) Michael McDonald to (Ireland) Connacht (loan)
- (South Africa) Gareth Milasinovich to (France) Valence Romans Drôme Rugby
- (Australia) Declan Moore to (Ireland) Connacht (loan)
- (Ireland) Jordi Murphy retired
- (Scotland) Rory Sutherland to (France) Oyonnax
- (Samoa) Jeffery Toomaga-Allen to (Australia) Queensland Reds
- (South Africa) Duane Vermeulen retired

Ulster Rugby squad (Note: Taking into account signings and departures ahead of 2023–24 season as listed on List of 2023–24 United Rugby Championship transfers.)
**Props**: (Ireland) **Tom O'Toole** (18 apps, 16 starts); (South Africa) **Steven Kitshoff** (14 apps, 10 starts); (Ireland) **Eric O'Sullivan** (11 apps, 9 starts); (Ireland) Andrew Warwick (22 apps, 5 starts, 5 pts); (Ireland) Scott Wilson (15 apps, 3 starts, 5 pts); (Ireland) **Marty Moore** (9 apps, 3 starts); (Ireland) Greg McGrath (3 apps, 2 starts) (Note: Greg McGrath had left the squad by late January 2024.); (Ireland) James French (4 apps, 1 start, 1 (yellow card) ); (Ireland) Callum Reid (2 apps); (Ireland) Ben Griffin (Note: Ben Griffin was released in mid-season.); **Hookers**: (Ireland) **Tom Stewart** (22 apps, 13 starts, 45 pts); (Ireland) **Rob Herring** (12 apps, 10 starts, 15 pts); (Ireland) John Andrew (12 apps, 2 starts); (Ireland) Zac Solomon (1 app); (Ireland) James McCormick; **Locks**: (Ireland) **Iain Henderson** (c) (13 apps, 12 starts, 1 (yellow card) ); (Ireland) Alan O'Connor (17 apps, 13 starts); (Ireland) **Kieran Treadwell** (16 apps, 13 starts, 5 pts, 2 (yellow card) ); (Ireland) Harry Sheridan (19 apps, 10 starts, 10 pts); (Ireland) Cormac Izuchukwu (16 apps, 7 starts, 5 pts); (Ireland) Joe Hopes (1 app)	**Back row**: (Ireland) **Nick Timoney** (21 apps, 21 starts, 60 pts, 1 (yellow card) ); (Ireland) David McCann (18 apps, 17 starts, 40 pts, 1 (yellow card) ); (Ireland) Matty Rea (17 apps, 13 starts, 10 pts, 1 (yellow card) ); (Zimbabwe) Dave Ewers (15 apps, 8 starts); (Ireland) Marcus Rea (9 apps, 5 starts, 5 pts); (Ireland) Reuben Crothers (5 apps, 4 starts, 5 pts); (England) Sean Reffell* (5 apps, 3 starts); (Ireland) James McNabney (3 apps, 3 starts); (Ireland) Greg Jones (3 apps); (Ireland) Lorcan McLoughlin (1 app); **Scrum-halves**: (Ireland) **John Cooney** (21 apps, 18 starts, 141 pts); (Ireland) Nathan Doak (23 apps, 10 starts, 71 pts); (Ireland) David Shanahan (6 apps, 1 start, 5 pts); (Ireland) Conor McKee; **Fly-halves**: (Ireland) **Billy Burns** (20 apps, 16 starts, 5 pts); (Ireland) Jake Flannery (11 apps, 5 starts, 23 pts)	**Centres**: (Ireland) **James Hume** (18 apps, 18 starts, 10 pts, 1 (yellow card) ); (Ireland) **Stuart McCloskey** (17 apps, 17 starts, 20 pts); (Ireland) Stewart Moore (15 apps, 7 starts, 5 pts); (Ireland) Jude Postlethwaite (10 apps, 5 starts); (Ireland) **Luke Marshall** (6 apps, 2 starts, 2 (yellow card) ); (Zimbabwe) Angus Curtis* (1 app, 1 start) (Note: Angus Curtis retired on medical advice on 26 January 2024.); (Ireland) Ben Carson (1 app); **Wings**: (Ireland) **Jacob Stockdale** (20 apps, 19 starts, 55 pts, 1 (yellow card) ); (Ireland) **Robert Baloucoune** (15 apps, 15 starts, 10 pts); (Ireland) Ethan McIlroy (12 apps, 8 starts); (Ireland) Ben Moxham (3 apps, 1 start); (Ireland) Aaron Sexton (2 app, 1 start); **Fullbacks**: (Ireland) **Will Addison** (18 apps, 16 starts, 20 pts, 1 (yellow card) ); (Ireland) **Michael Lowry** (17 apps, 14 starts, 20 pts); (Ireland) Shea O'Brien (1 app)
(c) denotes the team captain, **Bold** denotes internationally capped players. Italics denotes academy players who appeared in the senior team.^{*} denotes players qualified to play for Ireland on residency or dual nationality.^{ST} denotes a short-term signing.

=== Academy squad ===
==== Players in ====
- (Ireland) Jack Boal from (Ireland) Queen's University RFC
- (Ireland) Jacob Boyd from (Ireland) RBAI
- (Ireland) Tom Brigg from (Ireland) Blackrock College
- (Ireland) Cameron Doak from (Ireland) Belfast Harlequins
- (Ireland) Ethan Graham from (Ireland) Ballynahinch RFC
- (Ireland) Charlie Irvine from (Ireland) Queen's University RFC
- (Ireland) Lukas Kenny from (Ireland) Campbell College
- (Ireland) Ben McFarlane from (Ireland) Methodist College Belfast
- (Ireland) Zac Solomon from (Ireland) Belfast Harlequins
- (Ireland) Josh Stevens from (Ireland) Methodist College Belfast
- (England) Henry Walker from (England) Hartpury College

==== Players out ====
Ulster Rugby academy squad
**Props**: (Ireland) Jack Boal **(1)**; (Ireland) Jacob Boyd **(1)**; (Ireland) Cameron Doak **(1)**; (Ireland) George Saunderson **(3)**; (Ireland) Scott Wilson **(2)**; **Hookers**: (Ireland) Zac Solomon **(1)**; (England) Henry Walker* **(1)**; **Locks**: (Ireland) Joe Hopes **(2)**; (Ireland) Charlie Irvine **(1)**	**Back row**: (Ireland) Tom Brigg **(1)**; (Ireland) Lorcan McLoughlin **(2)**; (Ireland) James McNabney **(2)**; (Ireland) Josh Stevens **(1)**; **Scrum-halves**: None currently named; **Fly-halves**: (Ireland) James Humphreys **(3)**	**Centres**: None currently named; **Back three**: (Ireland) Ethan Graham **(1)**; (Ireland) Lukas Kenny **(1)**; (Ireland) Ben McFarlane **(1)**; (Ireland) Rory Telfer **(2)**
Number in brackets indicates players stage in the three-year academy cycle.^{*} denotes players qualified to play for Ireland on residency or dual nationality. Players and their allocated positions from the Ulster Rugby website.

== Men's competitions and results ==
=== Season record ===
Competition	Played	Won	Drawn	Lost	PF	PA	PD	TF	TA
2023-24 Champions Cup	4	1	0	3	88	147	-59	12	22
2023-24 Challenge Cup	2	1	0	1	54	70	-16	8	9
2023-24 URC	19	11	0	8	457	452	5	56	61
Total	25	13	0	12	599	669	-70	76	92

=== Home attendance ===
Domestic League					European Cup					Total	
League	Fixtures	Average Attendance	Highest	Lowest	League	Fixtures	Average Attendance	Highest	Lowest	Total Attendance	Average Attendance
2023–24 United Rugby Championship	8†	13,679	18,196	10,181	2023–24 European Rugby Champions Cup	2	14,437	16,592	12,282	138,305	13,831

=== 2023–24 United Rugby Championship ===
2023–24 United Rugby Championship
	Team	P	W	D	L	PF	PA	PD	TF	TA	TB	LB	Pts
1	(Ireland) Munster	18	13	1	4	483	318	+165	65	38	11	3	68
2	(South Africa) Bulls (RU)	18	13	0	5	639	433	+206	85	54	11	3	66
3	(Ireland) Leinster	18	13	0	5	554	350	+204	81	43	11	2	65
4	(Scotland) Glasgow Warriors (CH)	18	13	0	5	519	353	+166	76	35	11	2	65
5	(South Africa) Stormers	18	12	0	6	468	348	+120	58	45	7	4	59
6	(Ireland) Ulster	18	11	0	7	437	409	+28	53	55	5	5	54
7	(Italy) Benetton	18	11	1	6	411	400	+11	51	56	6	2	54
8	(Wales) Ospreys	18	10	0	8	414	449	–35	53	53	8	2	50
9	(South Africa) Lions	18	9	0	9	526	398	+128	67	50	8	6	50
10	(Scotland) Edinburgh	18	11	0	7	416	397	+19	47	52	3	2	49
11	(Ireland) Connacht	18	9	0	9	404	432	–28	51	57	4	5	45
12	(Wales) Cardiff	18	4	1	13	384	410	–26	50	51	4	10	32
13	(Wales) Scarlets	18	5	0	13	313	575	–262	37	77	4	3	27
14	(South Africa) Sharks	18	4	0	14	343	431	–88	47	55	3	6	25
15	(Wales) Dragons	18	3	0	15	300	611	–311	36	84	1	3	16
16	(Italy) Zebre Parma	18	1	1	16	345	643	–298	42	94	4	5	15
If teams are level at any stage, tiebreakers are applied in the following order: 1. number of matches won; 2. the difference between points for and points against; 3. the number of tries scored; 4. the most points scored; 5. the difference between tries for and tries against; 6. the fewest red cards received; 7. the fewest yellow cards received.
Green background indicates teams that are in play-off places and earn a place in the 2024–25 European Champions Cup Pink background indicates teams that are in play-off places and earn a place in the 2024–25 European Challenge Cup; Yellow background indicates the team that won the 2023–24 European Challenge Cup and thus qualify for the 2024–25 European Champions Cup, but are not in a play-off place Plain background indicates teams that earn a place in the 2024–25 European Challenge Cup. Q: qualified for play-offs. H: home field advantage secured for quarter-and semi-final. h: home field advantage secured for quarter-final X: cannot reach play-offs. E: qualified for Champions Cup.

==== Results ====
21 October 2023	(2 BP) Zebre Parma (Italy)	36-40	(Ireland) Ulster (1 BP)	Stadio Sergio Lanfranchi, Parma
13:00	Try: Licata (2) 4' 13'; Pani 22'; Gregory 40'; Gesi (2) 41' 70'; Con: Prisciantelli (3) 5' 14' 23'	Report; Match centre Player of the match: Kieran Treadwell; Highlights	Try: Flannery 9'; Lowry 16'; Stockdale (2) 28' 60'; Stewart (2) 52' 66'; Con: N. Doak (5) 11' 17' 29' 53' 68'; Cards: Treadwell (yellow card) 34'; French (yellow card) 80'	Attendance: 1,600; Referee: Adam Jones
Ulster lineup: 1. Andrew Warwick, 2. Tom Stewart (c), 3. Greg McGrath, 4. Matty Rea, 5. Kieran Treadwell, 6. Dave Ewers, 7. Marcus Rea, 8. David McCann, 9. Nathan Doak, 10. Jake Flannery, 11. Jacob Stockdale, 12. Angus Curtis, 13. James Hume, 14. Michael Lowry, 15. Will Addison.; Replacements: 16. John Andrew (for Stewart 76'), 17. Callum Reid (for Warwick 49'), 18. James French (for McGrath 50'), 19. Cormac Izuchukwu (for Matty Rea 50'), 20. Nick Timoney (for Marcus Rea 50'), 21. David Shanahan (for Doak 76'), 22. Billy Burns (for Flannery 55'), 23. Stewart Moore (for Hume 3-11', for Curtis 40').; URC Fantasy team of the week: Michael Lowry, Jacob Stockdale				Attendance: 1,600; Referee: Adam Jones

29 October 2023	Ulster (Ireland)	26-19	(South Africa) Bulls	Ravenhill Stadium, Belfast
17:00	Try: Stewart 9'; Stockdale 28'; Con: N. Doak (2) 10' 30'; Pen: N. Doak (4) 42' 50' 63' 73'; Cards: Addison (yellow card) 25'	Report; Match centre Player of the match: Tom O'Toole; Highlights	Try: G. Steenekamp 35'; De Klerk 40'; E. Louw 68'; Con: Goosen (2) 36' 69'	Attendance: 10,181
Ulster lineup: 1. Andrew Warwick, 2. Tom Stewart, 3. Tom O'Toole, 4. Alan O'Connor (c), 5. Cormac Izuchukwu, 6. Dave Ewers, 7. David McCann, 8. Nick Timoney, 9. Nathan Doak, 10. Billy Burns, 11. Jacob Stockdale, 12. Jude Postlethwaite, 13. James Hume, 14. Robert Baloucoune, 15. Will Addison.; Replacements: 16. John Andrew (for Stewart 77'), 17. Callum Reid (for Warwick 63'), 18. Greg McGrath, 19. Harry Sheridan (for Izuchukwu 36'), 20. Marcus Rea (for Ewers 40'), 21. David Shanahan, 22. Stewart Moore (for Stockdale 76'), 23. Michael Lowry (for Addison 56').; URC Fantasy team of the week: Tom Stewart, Tom O'Toole				Attendance: 10,181

4 November 2023	Connacht (Ireland)	22-20	(Ireland) Ulster (1 BP)	The Sportsground, Galway
19:35	Try: Forde 48'; Farrell 53'; Kilgallen 73'; Con: Carty (2) 48' 54'; Pen: Carty 19'	Report; Match centre Highlights	Try: Flannery 33'; Shanahan 41'; Con: Flannery (2) 34' 42'; Pen: Flannery (2)22' 36'	Attendance: 5,468; Referee: Morné Ferreira
Ulster lineup: 1. Eric O'Sullivan, 2. John Andrew, 3. James French, 4. Alan O'Connor (c), 5. Harry Sheridan, 6. Matty Rea, 7. Reuben Crothers, 8. Nick Timoney, 9. David Shanahan, 10. Jake Flannery, 11. Aaron Sexton, 12. Stewart Moore, 13. James Hume, 14. Ben Moxham, 15. Ethan McIlroy.; Replacements: 16. Tom Stewart, 17. Andrew Warwick (for O'Sullivan 52'), 18. Greg McGrath (for French 59'), 19. Joe Hopes (for Matty Rea 65'), 20. David McCann (for Crothers 1'), 21. Nathan Doak (for Shanahan 59'), 22. Billy Burns (for Flannery 59'), 23. Ben Carson (for Hume 47').; URC Fantasy Team of the Week: Jake Flannery, Harry Sheridan				Attendance: 5,468; Referee: Morné Ferreira

10 November 2023	Ulster (Ireland)	21-14	(Ireland) Munster (1 BP)	Ravenhill Stadium, Belfast
19:35	Try: Stockdale 26'; Timoney 67'; Con: N. Doak 68'; Pen: N. Doak (3) 13' 46' 63'	Report; Match centre Player of the Match: David McCann; Highlights	Try: Casey (2) 7' 17'; Con: Crowley (2) 8' 19'; Cards: Daly (yellow card) 13'	Attendance: 14,960; Referee: Frank Murphy
Ulster lineup: 1. Eric O'Sullivan, 2. Tom Stewart (c), 3. Greg McGrath, 4. Cormac Izuchukwu, 5. Kieran Treadwell, 6. David McCann, 7. Marcus Rea, 8. Nick Timoney, 9. Nathan Doak, 10. Billy Burns, 11. Jacob Stockdale, 12. Stuart McCloskey, 13. Stewart Moore, 14. Robert Baloucoune, 15. Ethan McIlroy.; Replacements: 16. Rob Herring (for Stewart 50'), 17. Callum Reid, 18. Scott Wilson (for McGrath 50'), 19. Iain Henderson (for Izuchukwu 50'), 20. Dave Ewers (for Rea 59'), 21. John Cooney (for Doak 69'), 22. Jake Flannery (for Burns 72'), 23. Jude Postlethwaite (for McIlroy 13').; URC Fantasy team of the week: David McCann.				Attendance: 14,960; Referee: Frank Murphy

17 November 2023	Ulster (Ireland)	24-17	(South Africa) Lions (1 BP)	Ravenhill Stadium, Belfast
19:35	Try: Hume 28'; Stockdale 41'; Herring 46'; Con: N. Doak (3) 29' 42' 47'; Pen: Cooney 67'	Report; Match centre Highlights; Player of the match: Dave Ewers	Try: Kriel 10'; Sirgel 34'; Con: Nohamba (2) 12' 35'; Pen: Nohamba 35'	Attendance: 11,471; Referee: Andrea Piardi
Ulster lineup: 1. Andrew Warwick, 2. Rob Herring, 3. Scott Wilson, 4. Alan O'Connor, 5. Iain Henderson (c), 6. Dave Ewers, 7. Reuben Crothers, 8. David McCann, 9. Nathan Doak, 10. Jake Flannery, 11. Jacob Stockdale, 12. Stuart McCloskey, 13. James Hume, 14. Robert Baloucoune, 15. Stewart Moore.; Replacements: 16. John Andrew, 17. Eric O'Sullivan (for Warwick 61'), 18. Marty Moore (for Wilson 44'), 19. Harry Sheridan (for O'Connor 70'), 20. Lorcan McLoughlin (for Crothers 54'), 21. John Cooney (for Doak 51'), 22. Billy Burns (for Flannery 61'), 23. Aaron Sexton.; URC Fantasy team of the week: James Hume, Scott Wilson				Attendance: 11,471; Referee: Andrea Piardi

25 November 2023	(1 BP) Glasgow Warriors (Scotland)	33-20	(Ireland) Ulster	Scotstoun Stadium, Glasgow
19:35	Try: Kennedy 20'; George Turner 41'; Rowe 50'; Matthews (2) 58' 70'; Con: Jordan (4) 21' 42' 59' 71'	Report; Match centre	Try: Stewart 5'; Cooney 10'; Con: Cooney (2) 6' 11'; Pen: Cooney 56'; N. Doak 63'; Cards: Treadwell (yellow card) 50'	Attendance: 7,216; Referee: Ben Whitehouse
Ulster lineup: 1. Eric O'Sullivan, 2. Tom Stewart, 3. Tom O'Toole, 4. Kieran Treadwell, 5. Iain Henderson (c), 6. Harry Sheridan, 7. Reuben Crothers, 8. James McNabney, 9. John Cooney, 10. Billy Burns, 11. Jacob Stockdale, 12. Luke Marshall, 13. James Hume, 14. Robert Baloucoune, 15. Will Addison.; Replacements: 16. Zac Solomon (for Stewart 71'), 17. Steven Kitshoff (for O'Sullivan 49'), 18. Marty Moore (for O'Toole 49'), 19. Alan O'Connor (for Henderson 49'), 20. Matty Rea (for Sheridan 12'-18', 52'); 21. David Shanahan (for Cooney 59'), 22. Nathan Doak (for Burns 19'), 23. Ben Moxham (for Marshall 63').				Attendance: 7,216; Referee: Ben Whitehouse

2 December 2023	(2 BP) Ulster (Ireland)	24-27	(Scotland) Edinburgh	Ravenhill Stadium, Belfast
17:15	Try: Stewart (2) 5' c, 28' m Baloucoune 73' m Hume 80' c Con: Cooney (1/2) 6'; N. Doak (1/2) 81'	Report; Match centre	Try: Vellacott 24' c Schoeman 58' c Hislop 69' c Con: Healy (3/3) 25', 60', 71'; Pen: Healy (2/2) 16', 40'; Cards: Paterson (yellow card) 77'	Attendance: 12,403; Referee: Federico Vedovelli
Ulster lineup: 1. Steven Kitshoff, 2. Tom Stewart, 3. Tom O'Toole, 4. Alan O'Connor (c), 5. Kieran Treadwell, 6. Matty Rea, 7. Nick Timoney, 8. James McNabney, 9. John Cooney, 10. Billy Burns, 11. Jacob Stockdale, 12. Stuart McCloskey, 13. James Hume, 14. Robert Baloucoune, 15. Will Addison.; Replacements: 16. John Andrew (for Stewart 74'), 17. Andrew Warwick (for Kitshoff 60'), 18. Marty Moore (for O'Toole 55'), 19. Cormac Izuchukwu (for Treadwell 74'), 20. Dave Ewers (for McNabney 49-55', for Matty Rea 55'), 21. Nathan Doak (for Cooney 49'), 22. Stewart Moore (for McCloskey 55-71', for Addison 71'), 23. Ben Moxham (for Stockdale 65').				Attendance: 12,403; Referee: Federico Vedovelli

22 December 2023	Ulster (Ireland)	20-19	(Ireland) Connacht (1 BP)	Ravenhill Stadium, Belfast
19:35	Try: Warwick 2'; Timoney 18'; Con: Cooney (2) 3' 20'; Pen: Cooney (2) 50' 65'	Report; Match centre Player of the match: Iain Henderson	Try: Aki 8'; Hurley-Langton 59'; Bolton 68'; Con: Carty 9'; Hanrahan 69'	Attendance: 18,196; Referee: Eoghan Cross
Ulster Lineup: 1. Andrew Warwick, 2. Tom Stewart, 3. Marty Moore, 4. Kieran Treadwell, 5. Iain Henderson (c), 6. Matty Rea, 7. Sean Reffell, 8. Nick Timoney, 9. John Cooney, 10. Jake Flannery, 11. Jacob Stockdale, 12. Stuart McCloskey, 13. James Hume, 14. Robert Baloucoune, 15. Will Addison.; Replacements: 16. John Andrew, 17. Steven Kitshoff (for Warwick 50'), 18. Tom O'Toole (for M. Moore 50'), 19. Alan O'Connor (for Treadwell 69'), 20. Harry Sheridan (for Reffell 53'), 21. Nathan Doak (for Flannery 61'), 22. Jude Postlethwaite (for Hume 65'), 23. Shea O'Brien (for Addison 77').; URC Fantasy team of the week: Kieran Treadwell.				Attendance: 18,196; Referee: Eoghan Cross

1 January 2024	(1 BP) Leinster (Ireland)	21-22	(Ireland) Ulster	RDS Arena, Dublin
17:15	Try: Healy 11'; Russell 23'; Sheehan 62'; Con: Prendergast (2) 12' 24'; H. Byrne 63'	Report; Match centre Player of the match: Billy Burns	Try: Timoney (2) 4' 35'; Stockdale 7'; Con: Cooney (2) 5' 37'; Pen: Cooney 55'	Attendance: 16,248; Referee: Frank Murphy
Ulster lineup: 1. Steven Kitshoff, 2. Rob Herring, 3. Tom O'Toole, 4. Kieran Treadwell, 5. Iain Henderson (c), 6. Matty Rea, 7. Sean Reffell, 8. Nick Timoney, 9. John Cooney, 10. Billy Burns, 11. Jacob Stockdale, 12. Stuart McCloskey, 13. Luke Marshall, 14. Robert Baloucoune, 15. Will Addison; Replacements: 16. Tom Stewart (for Herring 49'), 17. Andrew Warwick (for Kitshoff 63'), 18. Scott Wilson (for O'Toole 63'), 19. Alan O'Connor (for Henderson 64'), 20. Dave Ewers (for Reffell 63'), 21. Nathan Doak (for Burns 74'), 22. Michael Lowry (for Baloucoune 50'), 23. Jude Postlethwaite.; URC Fantasy team of the week: Nick Timoney, Sean Reffell.				Attendance: 16,248; Referee: Frank Murphy

18 February 2024	Ospreys (Wales)	19-17	(Ireland) Ulster (1BP)	Swansea.com Stadium
15:00	Try: K. Williams 64'; Con: D. Edwards 66'; Pen: D. Edwards (3) 29 36' 55'; Drop: D. Edwards 79'; Cards: Morse (yellow card) 48'; Ratti (yellow card) 57'	Report; Match centre	Try: Marcus Rea 33'; Stewart 57'; Con: N. Doak (2) 34' 59'; Pen: Flannery 75'; Cards: Marshall (yellow card) 61'	Attendance: 5,093; Referee: Federico Vedovelli
Ulster lineup: 1. Andrew Warwick, 2. John Andrew, 3. Marty Moore, 4. Harry Sheridan, 5. Iain Henderson, 6. David McCann, 7. Marcus Rea, 8. Nick Timoney, 9. Nathan Doak, 10. Jake Flannery, 11. Jacob Stockdale, 12. Jude Postlethwaite, 13. James Hume, 14. Ethan McIlroy, 15. Will Addison.; Replacements: 16. Tom Stewart (for Andrew 48'), 17. Steven Kitshoff (for Warwick 52'), 18. Scott Wilson (for M. Moore 25'), 19. Cormac Izuchukwu (for Henderson 29'), 20. Matty Rea (for Marcus Rea 70'), 21. David Shanahan (for Doak 59'), 22. Luke Marshall (for Postlethwaite 59'), 23. Robert Baloucoune.				Attendance: 5,093; Referee: Federico Vedovelli

2 March 2024	(1 BP) Ulster (Ireland)	49-26	(Wales) Dragons (1 BP)	Ravenhill Stadium, Belfast
19:35	Try: Addison 4'; Lowry (2) 17' 32'; Sheridan 29'; McCann (2) 56' 75'; Timoney 71'; Con: Cooney (7) 5' 19' 30' 33' 57' 73' 75'; Cards: Timoney (yellow card) 79'	Report; Match centre Player of the Match: Jude Postlethwaite	Try: Benjamin 11'; Screech 51'; Coghlan 64'; Penalty try Con: Reed (2) 12' 65'	Attendance: 12,565; Referee: Ian Kenny
Ulster lineup: 1. Steven Kitshoff, 2. Tom Stewart, 3. Tom O'Toole, 4. Cormac Izuchukwu, 5. Harry Sheridan, 6. David McCann, 7. Marcus Rea, 8. Nick Timoney, 9. John Cooney, 10. Billy Burns, 11. Michael Lowry, 12. Jude Postlethwaite, 13. James Hume (c), 14. Ethan McIlroy, 15. Will Addison.; Replacements: 16. John Andrew (for Stewart 67'), 17. Andrew Warwick (for Kitshoff 52'), 18. Scott Wilson (for O'Toole 67'), 19. Kieran Treadwell (for Izuchukwu 52'), 20. Sean Reffell (for Marcus Rea 52'), 21. Nathan Doak (for Burns 52'), 22. Luke Marshall (for Postlethwaite 67'), 23. Jacob Stockdale (for Addison 52').; URC Fantasy Team of the Week: Harry Sheridan, David McCann.				Attendance: 12,565; Referee: Ian Kenny

23 March 2024	Sharks (South Africa)	22-12	(Ireland) Ulster	Kings Park Stadium, Durban
13:00	Try: Buthelezi 26'; Keyter 45'; Mbonambi 65'; Con: Masuku (2) 28' 47'; Pen: Masuku 53'; Cards: Tshituka (yellow card) 64'	Report; Match centre	Try: Sheridan 18'; Treadwell 56'; Con: Cooney 19'; Cards: Henderson (yellow card) 64'; Hume (yellow card) 64'	Referee: Ben Whitehouse
Ulster lineup: 1. Steven Kitshoff, 2. Tom Stewart, 3. Tom O'Toole, 4. Kieran Treadwell, 5. Iain Henderson (c), 6. Harry Sheridan, 7. David McCann, 8. Nick Timoney, 9. John Cooney, 10. Billy Burns, 11. Michael Lowry, 12. Stuart McCloskey, 13. James Hume, 14. Ethan McIlroy, 15. Will Addison.; 16. John Andrew (for Stewart 66'), 17. Andrew Warwick (for Kitshoff 50'), 18. Scott Wilson (for O'Toole 63'), 19. Cormac Izuchukwu (for Treadwell 73'), 20. Matty Rea (for Sheridan 61'), 21. Nathan Doak (for Burns 41'), 22. Jude Postlethwaite (for Addison 72'), 23. Sean Reffell (for Timoney 50').				Referee: Ben Whitehouse

30 March 2013	Stormers (South Africa)	13-7	(Ireland) Ulster (1 BP)	Cape Town Stadium
17:15	Try: Roos 73'; Con: Libbok 74'; Pen: Libbok (2) 54' 81'	Report; Match centre	Try: Timoney 7'; Con: Cooney 8'; Cards: McCann (yellow card) 60'	Attendance: 24,602; Referee: Sam Grove-White
Ulster lineup: 1. Steven Kitshoff, 2. Rob Herring, 3. Tom O'Toole; 4. Harry Sheridan, 5. Kieran Treadwell, 6. Matty Rea, 7. David McCann, 8. Nick Timoney, 9. John Cooney, 10. Nathan Doak, 11. Ethan McIlroy, 12. Stuart McCloskey, 13. James Hume, 14. Robert Baloucoune, 15. Michael Lowry.; 16. Replacements: 16. Tom Stewart (for Herring 56'), 17. Andrew Warwick (for Kitshoff 56'), 18. Scott Wilson (for O'Toole 56'), 19. Cormac Izuchukwu (for Treadwell 56'), 20. Marcus Rea (for Matty Rea 72'), 21. David Shanahan, 22. Jake Flannery, 23. Stewart Moore (for Lowry 8').				Attendance: 24,602; Referee: Sam Grove-White

19 April 2024	Ulster (Ireland)	19-17	(Wales) Cardiff (1 BP)	Ravenhill Stadium, Belfast
19:35	Try: McCann; Con: Cooney; Pen: N. Doak (2) 27' 35'; Cooney (2) 65' 79'; Cards: Stockdale (yellow card) 48'	Report; Match centre Player of the match: Harry Sheridan	Try: Cabango (2) 11' 42'; Con: De Beer (2) 12' 43'; Pen: De Beer 71'; Cards: Carré (yellow card) 78'	Attendance: 13,679; Referee: Mike Adamson
Ulster lineup: 1. Eric O'Sullivan, 2. Tom Stewart, 3. Scott Wilson, 4. Harry Sheridan, 5. Alan O'Connor, 6. Dave Ewers, 7. Marcus Rea, 8. David McCann, 9. Nathan Doak, 10. Jake Flannery, 11. Jacob Stockdale, 12. Jude Postlethwaite, 13. James Hume, 14. Michael Lowry, 15. Will Addison.; Replacements: 16. John Andrew (for Stewart 60'), 17. Andrew Warwick (for O'Sullivan 51'), 18. Tom O'Toole (for Wilson 51-), 19. Cormac Izuchukwu (for O'Connor 65'), 20. Greg Jones (for Marcus Rea 75'), 21. John Cooney (for Doak 54'), 22. Billy Burns (for Flannery 40'), 23. Ethan McIlroy (for Hume 19').; URC Fantasy Team of the Week: Scott Wilson, Harry Sheridan				Attendance: 13,679; Referee: Mike Adamson

26 April 2024	(1 BP) Ulster (Ireland)	38-34	(Italy) Benetton (2 BP)	Ravenhill Stadium, Belfast
19:35	Try: Stewart 15'; Crothers 32'; Stockdale 39'; Addison 49'; Izuchukwu 66'; Con: Cooney (5) 16' 33' 40' 51' 67'; Pen: Cooney 73'; Cards: Marshall (yellow card) 80'	Report; Match centre Player of the match: John Cooney	Try: Menoncello 5'; Umaga 46'; Halafihi 56'; Nemer 62'; Albornoz 80'; Con: Albornoz (3) 57' 64' 81'; Pen: Umaga 24'	Referee: Sam Grove-White
Ulster lineup: 1. Eric O'Sullivan, 2 Tom Stewart, 3. Scott Wilson, 4. Harry Sheridan, 5. Alan O'Connor (c), 6. Dave Ewers, 7. Reuben Crothers, 8. David McCann, 9. John Cooney, 10. Billy Burns, 11. Jacob Stockdale, 12. Stuart McCloskey, 13. Will Addison, 14. Robert Baloucoune, 15. Michael Lowry.; Replacements: 16. John Andrew (for Stewart 74'), 17. Andrew Warwick (for O'Sullivan 53'), 18. James French (for Wilson 64'), 19. Cormac Izuchukwu (for O'Connor 64'), 20. Greg Jones (for Ewers 57'), 21. David Shanahan (for Cooney 77'), 22. Luke Marshall (for Addison 74'), 23. Ethan McIlroy (for Stockdale 44').; URC Fantasy team of the week: Jacob Stockdale.				Referee: Sam Grove-White

11 May 2024	Scarlets (Wales)	20-31	(Ireland) [Ulster (1 BP)	Parc y Scarlets, Llanelli
15:05	Try: Tuipulotu 60'; Lewis 66'; Con: Costelow (2) 61 67'; Pen: Costelow (2) 10' 26'; Cards: Plumtree (yellow card) 37'; Davies (yellow card) 40+2'	Report; Match centre Player of the match: Stuart McCloskey	Try: McCloskey 42'; Timoney 47'; McCann 54'; Stockdale 63'; Con: Cooney (4) 43' 49' 55' 65'; Pen: Cooney 27'	Attendance: 6,881; Referee: Gianluca Gnecchi
Ulster lineup: 1. Eric O'Sullivan, 2. Rob Herring, 3. Scott Wilson, 4. Kieran Treadwell, 5. Alan O'Connor (c), 6. Cormac Izuchukwu, 7. David McCann, 8. Nick Timoney, 9. John Cooney, 10. Billy Burns, 11. Jacob Stockdale, 12. Stuart McCloskey, 13. Will Addison, 14. Ethan McIlroy, 15. Michael Lowry.; Replacements: 16. Tom Stewart (for Herring 70'), 17. Andrew Warwick (for French 65'), 18. James French (for Wilson 20'), 19. Harry Sheridan (for Treadwell 57'), 20. Reuben Crothers (for Timoney 58'), 21. Nathan Doak (for Cooney 65'), 22. Stewart Moore (for McCloskey 65'), 23. Dave Ewers (for Izuchukwu 55').; URC fantasy team of the week: Stuart McCloskey, Cormac Izuchukwu				Attendance: 6,881; Referee: Gianluca Gnecchi

18 May 2024	Ulster (Ireland)	23-21	(Ireland) Leinster (1 BP)	Ravenhill Stadium, Belfast
19:35	Try: Herring 13'; Stockdale 57'; Con: Cooney (2) 14' 58'; Pen: Cooney (3) 32' 43' 78'	Report; Match centre Player of the match: John Cooney	Try: Ngatai 22'; Foley 26'; Alaalatoa 52'; Con: H. Byrne (3) 23' 29' 54'	Attendance: 15,976; Referee: Andrea Piardi
Ulster lineup: 1. Eric O'Sullivan, 2. Rob Herring, 3. Tom O'Toole, 4. Kieran Treadwell, 5. Alan O'Connor (c), 6. Cormac Izuchukwu, 7. David McCann, 8. Nick Timoney, 9. John Cooney, 10. Billy Burns, 11. Jacob Stockdale, 12. Stuart McCloskey, 13. Will Addison, 14. Michael Lowry, 15. Ethan McIlroy.; Replacements: 16. Tom Stewart (for Herring 49'), 17. Andrew Warwick (for O'Sullivan 54'), 18. Scott Wilson (for O'Toole 65'), 19. Harry Sheridan (for Treadwell 68'), 20. Matty Rea (for Izuchukwu 61'), 21. Nathan Doak (for Burns 73'), 22. Stewart Moore (for McIlroy 54'), 23. Jude Postlethwaite (for McCloskey 73').; URC fantasy team of the week: Jacob Stockdale.				Attendance: 15,976; Referee: Andrea Piardi

1 June 2024	(1 BP) Munster (Ireland)	29-24	(Ireland) Ulster (1 BP)	Thomond Park, Limerick
17:15	Try: Snyman 7'; Nash 51'; Daly 58'; Clarke 69'; Con: Crowley (3) 9', 53', 59'; Pen: Crowley 77'	Report; Match centre	Try: Herring 16'; McCann 40+3'; Rea 54'; Con: Cooney (3) 18', 40+4', 55'; Pen: Cooney 22'	Attendance: 17,496; Referee: Frank Murphy
Ulster lineup: 1. Eric O'Sullivan, 2. Rob Herring, 3. Tom O'Toole, 4. Kieran Treadwell, 5. Alan O'Connor, 6. Cormac Izuchukwu, 7. David McCann, 8. Nick Timoney, 9. John Cooney, 10. Billy Burns, 11. Jacob Stockdale, 12. Jude Postlethwaite, 13. Will Addison, 14. Michael Lowry, 15. Stewart Moore.; Replacements: 16. Tom Stewart (for Herring 59'), 17. Andrew Warwick (for O'Sullivan 53'), 18. Scott Wilson (for O'Toole 66'), 19. Harry Sheridan (for Treadwell 4'), 20. Matty Rea (for O'Connor 18'), 21. Nathan Doak, 22. Aaron Sexton (for Addison 59'), 23. Dave Ewers (for Matty Rea 63').				Attendance: 17,496; Referee: Frank Murphy

==== Quarter-final ====
8 June 2024	Leinster (Ireland)	43-20	(Ireland) Ulster	Aviva Stadium, Dublin
14:30	Try: Henshaw 20'; Lowe (2) 33' 45'; Larmour 62'; Van der Flier 67'; Molony 75'; Con: R. Byrne (4) 21' 34' 63' 68'; Prendergast 76'; Pen: R. Byrne 30'	Report; Match centre	Try: McCann 49'; S. Moore 64'; Lowry 79'; Con: Cooney 65'; Pen: Cooney 42'	Referee: Andrew Brace
Ulster lineup: 1. Eric O'Sullivan, 2. Rob Herring, 3. Tom O'Toole, 4. Harry Sheridan, 5. Cormac Izuchukwu, 6. Matty Rea, 7. David McCann, 8. Nick Timoney, 9. John Cooney, 10. Billy Burns, 11. Jacob Stockdale, 12. Stuart McCloskey, 13. Will Addison, 14. Michael Lowry, 15. Stewart Moore.; Replacements: 16. Tom Stewart (for Herring 69'), 17. Andrew Warwick (for O'Sullivan 50'), 18. Scott Wilson (for O'Toole 69'), 19. Greg Jones (for Izuchukwu 17'), 20. Dave Ewers (for Matty Rea 63'), 21. Nathan Doak (for Burns 57'), 22. Ethan McIlroy (for Stockdale 47'), 23. Jude Postlethwaite (for Addison 63').				Referee: Andrew Brace

=== 2023–24 European Rugby Champions Cup ===
==== Pool B ====
2023–24 European Rugby Champions Cup Pool B
Team	P	W	D	L	PF	PA	Diff	TF	TA	TB	LB	Pts
(France) Toulouse (1)	4	4	0	0	178	69	+109	26	10	4	0	20
(England) Harlequins (5)	4	3	0	1	151	109	+42	22	16	3	0	15
(England) Bath (9)	4	3	0	1	124	102	+22	18	14	3	0	15
(France) Racing 92 (16)	4	1	0	3	116	117	–1	17	16	2	2	8
(Ireland) Ulster (12CC)	4	1	0	3	88	147	–59	12	22	1	0	5
(Wales) Cardiff	4	0	0	4	80	193	–113	11	28	2	1	3
Green background (rows 1 to 2) indicates qualification places for a home Champions Cup round of 16. Blue background (rows 3 to 4) indicates other teams qualified for the Champions Cup round of 16. Yellow background (row 5) indicates qualification place for the Challenge Cup round of 16. Plain background (row 6) indicates elimination from 2023–24 European competition. Starting table — source: European Professional Club Rugby

9 December 2023	(1 BP) Bath (England)	37-14	(Ireland) Ulster	The Recreation Ground, Bath
15:15	Try: Cokanasiga (2) 27' 71'; Dunn 45'; Du Toit 69'; Gallagher 78'; Con: Spencer (2) 46' 70'; Bailey 80'; Pen: Spencer (2) 32' 58'	Report; Match centre	Try: Burns 33'; N. Doak 37'; Con: N. Doak (2) 34' 37'; Cards: Matty Rea (yellow card) 65'	Attendance: 13,918; Referee: Pierre Brousset
Ulster lineup: 1. Steven Kitshoff, 2. Tom Stewart, 3. Tom O'Toole, 4. Alan O'Connor, 5. Iain Henderson (c), 6. Dave Ewers, 7. Nick Timoney, 8. James McNabney, 9. Nathan Doak, Billy Burns, 11. Jacob Stockdale, 12. Stuart McCloskey, 13. James Hume, 14. Robert Baloucoune, 15. Stewart Moore.; Replacements: 16. Rob Herring (for Stewart 46'), 17. Andrew Warwick (for Kitshoff 71'), 18. Marty Moore (for O'Toole 46'), 19. Kieran Treadwell (for O'Connor 49'), 20. Matty Rea (for McNabney 5'), 21. John Cooney (for Doak 51'), 22. Jake Flannery (for Burns 59'), 23. Michael Lowry (for S. Moore 70').				Attendance: 13,918; Referee: Pierre Brousset

16 December 2023	(1 BP) Ulster (Ireland)	31-15	(France) Racing 92	Ravenhill Stadium, Belfast
20:00	Try: Timoney 3' 46'; McCloskey 22'; Matty Rea 36'; Con: Cooney (4) 4' 23' 38' 48'; Pen: Cooney 69'	Report; Match centre Player of the match: Stuart McCloskey	Try: Le Garrec 29'; Tarrit (2) 55' 65'	Attendance: 12,282; Referee: Luke Pearce
Ulster lineup: 1. Steven Kitshoff, 2. Rob Herring, 3. Tom O'Toole, 4. Alan O'Connor, 5. Iain Henderson (c), 6. Dave Ewers, 7. Nick Timoney, 8. Matty Rea, 9. John Cooney, 10. Billy Burns, 11. Jacob Stockdale, 12. Stuart McCloskey, 13. James Hume, 14. Robert Baloucoune, 15. Michael Lowry.; Replacements: 16. Tom Stewart (for Herring 10-23', 55'), 17. Eric O'Sullivan (for Kitshoff 76'), 18. Scott Wilson (for O'Toole 76'), 19. Kieran Treadwell (for O'Connor 59'), 20. Harry Sheridan (for Matty Rea 59'), 21. Nathan Doak (for Cooney 78'), 22. Jake Flannery (for Burns 52'), 23. Stewart Moore (For Hume 78').				Attendance: 12,282; Referee: Luke Pearce

13 January 2024	Ulster (Ireland)	24–48	(France) Toulouse (1 BP)	Ravenhill Stadium, Belfast
20:00	Try: Stewart 41' c Addison 61' c Timoney 68' c Con: Cooney (1/1) 41'; N. Doak (2/2) 62', 68'; Pen: Cooney (1/1) 12'	Report	Try: Lebel 9' c Mauvaka (2) 30' m, 52' m Dupont (2) 34' c, 46' c Roumat 56' c Meafou 80' c Con: Ramos (4/6) 10', 36', 48', 57'; Kinghorn (1/1) 80'; Pen: Ramos (1/1) 18'	Attendance: 16,592; Referee: Matthew Carley
Ulster lineup: 1. Steven Kitshoff, 2. Tom Stewart, 3. Tom O'Toole, 4. Kieran Treadwell, 5. Iain Henderson (c), 6. Dave Ewers, 7. Sean Reffell, 8. Nick Timoney, 9. John Cooney, 10. Billy Burns, 11. Jacob Stockdale, 12. Stuart McCloskey, 13. James Hume, 14. Robert Baloucoune, 15. Michael Lowry.; Replacements: 16. John Andrew (for Stewart 54'), 17. Andrew Warwick (for Kitshoff 64'), 18. Marty Moore (for O'Toole 54'), 19. Alan O'Connor (for Reffell 40'), 20. Matty Rea (for Ewers 7'), 21. Nathan Doak (for Cooney 54'), 22. Luke Marshall, 23. Will Addison (for Stockdale 58').				Attendance: 16,592; Referee: Matthew Carley

20 January 2024	Harlequins (England)	47–19	(Ireland) Ulster	Twickenham Stoop, London
13:00	Try: David (2) 4' c, 64' c Lynagh (2) 24' c, 32' c Care 47' c Esterhuizen 58' m Evans 72' c Con: Smith (6/7) 5', 26', 34', 48', 66', 73'; Cards: David (yellow card) 7'	Report	Try: McCann 14' c McCloskey 70' c Stockdale; Con: Cooney (1/1) 15'; N. Doak (1/2) 70'	Attendance: 12,579; Referee: Mathieu Raynal
Ulster lineup: 1. Steven Kitshoff, 2. Tom Stewart, 3. Tom O'Toole, 4. Kieran Treadwell, 5. Iain Henderson (c); 6. Matty Rea, 7. David McCann, 8. Nick Timoney, 9. John Cooney, 10. Billy Burns, 11. Jacob Stockdale, 12. Stuart McCloskey, 13. James Hume, 14. Robert Balocoune, 15. Michael Lowry.; Replacements: 16. John Andrew (for Stewart 48'), 17. Andrew Warwick (for Kitshoff 54'), 18. Marty Moore (for O'Toole 54-70'), 19. Harry Sheridan (for Treadwell 35'), 20. Marcus Rea (for Matty Rea 70'), 21. Nathan Doak (for Cooney 54'), 22. Luke Marshall (for Hume 40'), 23. Will Addison (for Lowry 70').				Attendance: 12,579; Referee: Mathieu Raynal

=== 2023–24 EPCR Challenge Cup ===
==== Round of 16 ====
7 April 2024	Montpellier (France) (5)	17-40	(12) (Ireland) Ulster	GGL Stadium, Montpellier
12:30	Try: Willemse 9'; Eymeri 23'; Con: Foursans-Bourdette (2) 10' 24'; Pen: Foursans-Bourdette 38'; Cards: Willemse (red card) 41'; Verhaege (yellow card) 65'; Karadze (yellow card) 66'; N'Gandebe (yellow card) 81'	Report; Player of the Match: David McCann	Try: Addison 27'; Baloucoune 42'; Wilson 62'; McCann 67'; McCloskey 77'; Penalty try 80'; Con: Cooney (4) 28' 63' 68' 79'	Referee: Ben Whitehouse
Ulster lineup: 1. Steven Kitshoff, 2. Rob Herring, 3. Tom O'Toole, 4. Alan O'Connor, 5. Iain Henderson (c), 6. Matty Rea, 7. David McCann, 8. Nick Timoney, 9. John Cooney, 10. Nathan Doak, 11. Stewart Moore, 12. Stuart McCloskey, 13. James Hume, 14. Robert Baloucoune, 15. Will Addison.; Replacements: 16. John Andrew (for Herring 65'), 17. Andrew Warwick (for Kitshoff 63'), 18. Scott Wilson (for O'Toole 57'), 19. Harry Sheridan (for O'Connor 49'), 20. Cormac Izuchukwu (for Henderson 79'), 21. David Shanahan (for Cooney 79'), 22. Jake Flannery (for Addison 41-51', for Doak 79'), 23. Dave Ewers (for Matty Rea 49').				Referee: Ben Whitehouse

==== Quarter-final ====
13 April 2024	Clermont (France) (4)	53-14	(12) (Ireland) Ulster	Stade Marcel-Michelin, Clermont-Ferrand
13:30	Try: Yato (2) 18' c, 68' c Sowakula (2) 36' c, 59' c Newsome 44' c Simmons 63' c Jurand 79' m Con: Belleau (4/4) 19', 37', 61', 64'; Delguy (1/1) 45'; Bézy (1/2) 69'; Pen: Belleau (2/3) 28', 32'	Report	Try: Timoney (2) 12' c, 43' c Con: Cooney (2/2) 13', 45'	Attendance: 13,945; Referee: Matthew Carley
Ulster lineup: 1. Steven Kitshoff, 2. Ron Herring, 3. Tom O'Toole, 4. Alan O'Connor, 5. Iain Henderson, 6. Harry Sheridan, 7. David McCann, 8. Nick Timoney, 9. John Cooney, 10. Nathan Doak, 11. Michael Lowry, 12. Stuart McCloskey, 13. James Hume, 14. Robert Baloucoune, 15. Stewart Moore.; Replacements: 16. Tom Stewart (for Herring 40'), 17. Andrew Warwick (for Kitshoff 55'), 18. Scott Wilson (for O'Toole 50'), 19. Cormac Izuchukwy (for O'Connor 64'), 20. Dave Ewers (for Henderson 40'); 21. Jake Flannery (for Doak 64'), 22. Ethan McIlroy (for S. Moore 5'), 23. Marcus Rea (for Timoney 53').				Attendance: 13,945; Referee: Matthew Carley

=== Friendlies ===
22 September 2023	Leinster (Ireland)	38–21	(Ireland) Ulster	Balreask Old, Navan
18:30	Try: H. Byrne; Turner (2); Brownlee; Barron; A. Osborne; Con: H. Byrne; Prendergast (3)	Report	Try: McCann; Sexton; Reid; Con: Shanahan; N. Doak (2)
Ulster lineup: 1. Callum Reid, 2. Tom Stewart, 3. James French, 4. Harry Sheridan, 5. Kieran Treadwell, 6. Dave Ewers, 7. Marcus Rea, 8. David McCann, 9. Dave Shanahan, 10. Billy Burns, 11. Michael Lowry, 12. Jude Postlethwaite, 13. Stewart Moore, 14. Rory Telfer, 15. Will Addison.; Replacements: Nick Timoney, John Andrew, Ben Griffin, Matty Rea, Cormac Izuchukwu, Greg Jones, Reuben Crothers, Lorcan McLoughlin, Conor McKee, Nathan Doak, Robert Baloucoune, Aaron Sexton, Ben Carson, Angus Curtis, Ethan McIlroy, Shea O'Brien.

30 September 2023	Benetton (Italy)	24–22	(Ireland) Ulster	Stadio Comunale di Monigo, Treviso
18:00	Try: Bernasconi; Ratave; Umaga; Izekor; Con: Umaga (2)	Report	Try: Timoney; O'Brien; McCann; Carson; Con: Flannery
Ulster lineup: 1. Callum Reid, 2. John Andrew, 3. Andrew Warwick, 4. Cormac Izuchukwu, 5. Harry Sheridan, 6. Matty Rea, 7. Reuben Crothers, 8. Nick Timoney, 9. Nathan Doak (c), 10. Jake Flannery, 11. Ethan McIlroy, 12. Angus Curtis, 13. Luke Marshall, 14. Robert Baloucoune, 15. Shea O'Brien.; Replacements: Cameron Doak, Tom Stewart, Ben Griffin, Kieran Treadwell, Joe Hopes, Dave Ewers, David McCann, Lorcan McLoughlin, David Shanahan, Conor McKee, Aaron Sexton, Ben Carson, Jude Postlethwaite, Stewart Moore.

7 October 2023	Ulster (Ireland)	19–14	(Scotland) Glasgow Warriors	Breffni Park, Cavan
18:00	Try: Ewers; Hume; Stewart; Con: Flannery (2)	Report	Try: Dobie; Hiddleston; Con: Weir (2)
Ulster lineup: 1. Andrew Warwick, 2. Tom Stewart (c), 3. Greg McGrath, 4. Matty Rea, 5. Kieran Treadwell, 6. Dave Ewers, 7. Marcus Rea, 8. David McCann, 9. Nathan Doak, 10. Jake Flannery, 11. Jacob Stockdale, 12. Jude Postlethwaite, 13. James Hume, 14. Robert Baloucoune, 15. Will Addison.; Replacements: John Andrew, Cameron Doak, Ben Griffin, Cormac Izuchukwu, Nick Timoney, Conor McKee, Billy Burns, Stewart Moore, Harry Sheridan, Reuben Crothers, David Shanahan, Ethan McIlroy, Ben Carson, Ben Moxham, Shea O'Brien, Angus Curtis, Aaron Sexton.

== Women's personnel ==
=== Staff ===
Position	Name	Nationality
Head coach	Murray Houston	Scotland
Contact skills coach	Kathryn Dane	Ireland
Backs coach	Grace Davitt	Ireland
Technical skills coach	Amy Davis	Ireland
Scrum coach	Eric O'Sullivan	Ireland

=== Squad ===
Ulster Senior Women's Squad
**Props**: (Ireland) Megan Brodie; (Ireland) Bronach Cassidy; (Ireland) Ava Fanning; (Ireland) **Sadhbh McGrath**; (Ireland) Aishling O'Connell; **Hookers**: (Ireland) Beth Cregan (c); (Ireland) Maebh Clenaghan; (Ireland) Sarah Roberts; (Ireland) Megan Simpson; **Locks**: (Ireland) Brenda Barr; (Ireland) Claire Boles; (Ireland) Keelin Brady; (Ireland) Taryn Schutzler	**Back row**: (Ireland) Sophie Barrett; (Ireland) India Daley; (Ireland) Chloe Donnan; (Ireland) **Brittany Hogan**; (Ireland) Gemma McCamley; (Ireland) Sarah Shrestha; (Ireland) Stacey Sloan; (Ireland) Fiona Tuite; **Scrum-halves**: (Ireland) Laura Cairns; (Ireland) Rachael McIlroy; (Ireland) Amber Redmond; **Fly-halves**: (Ireland) Toni McCartney; (Ireland) Amanda Morton; (Ireland) Abby Moyles	**Centres**: (Ireland) Mya Alcorn; (Ireland) Peita McAlister; (Ireland) Kelly McCormill; **Wings**: (Ireland) Megan Edwards; (Ireland) Emma Jordan; (Ireland) Maeve Liston; (Ireland) Niamh Marley; (Ireland) Lucy Thompson; (Ireland) Fern Wilson; **Fullbacks**: (Ireland) Ella Durkan; (Ireland) Jill Stephens
(c) denotes the team captain, **Bold** denotes internationally capped players. Italics denotes players selected for the 2023–24 Celtic Challenge.

== Women's competitions and results ==
=== 2023-24 Women's Interprovincial Series ===
	Team	P	W	D	L	PF	PA	LP	Pts
1	Munster	3	2	0	1	59	18	3	11
2	Leinster	3	2	0	1	58	16	3	11
3	Connacht	3	2	0	1	54	87	1	9
4	Ulster	3	0	0	3	43	127	2	2

12 August 2023	Ulster	14–41	Munster	Palace Grounds, Armagh
15:00	Try: Durkan; Clenaghan; Con: Durkan (2)	Report	Try: Carroll (3); O'Halloran; Ormond; Boylan; Heylmann; Con: Flannery (3)
Ulster: 1. Sadhbh McGrath, 2. Beth Cregan (c), 3. Gemma McCamley, 4. Fiona Tuite, 5. Keelin Brady, 6. Chloe Donnan, 7. Maebh Clenaghan, 8. Sophie Barrett, 9. Laura Cairns, 10. Abby Moyles, 11. Megan Edwards, 12. Ella Durkan, 13. Kelly McCormill, 14. Niamh Marley, 15. Maeve Liston.; Replacements: 16. Sarah Roberts, 17. Aisling O'Connell, 18. Taryn Schutzler, 19. Brenda Barr, 20. Amber Redmond, 21. Peita McAlister, 22. Toni Macartney, 23. Stacey Sloan.

19 August 2023	Leinster	57–5	Ulster	Energia Park, Dublin
13:00	Try: Haney (2); Corri; Tarpey; Campbell; Clarke; Boyne; Whelan; Wafer; Con: O'Connor (5); O'Brien	Report	Try: Marley
Ulster: 1. Gemma McCamley, 2. Beth Cregan (c), 3. Aisling O'Connell, 4. Keelin Brady, 5. Taryn Schutzler, 6. Sophie Barrett, 7. Maebh Clenaghan, 8. India Daly, 9. Laura Cairns, 10. Abby Moyles, 11. Maeve Liston, 12. Peita McAllister, 13. Kelly McCormill, 14. Niamh Marley, 15. Ella Durkan.; Replacements: 16. Sarah Roberts, 17. Megan Simpson, 18. Ava Fannin, 19. Stacey Sloan, 20. Rachael McIlroy, 21. Megan Edwards, 22. Emma Jordan, 23. Toni Macartney.

26 August 2023	Connacht	29–24	Ulster	The Sportsground, Galway
14:30	Try: Brady; Fenton; Ryder (2); O'Loughlin; Con: Fowley (2)	Report	Try: O'Connell; Durkan; Cregan; Cassidy; Con: Durkan (2)
Ulster: 1. Ava Fannin, 2. Beth Cregan (c), 3. Aisling O'Connell, 4. Keelin Brady, 5. Taryn Schutzler, 6. Sophie Barrett, 7. Maebh Clenaghan, 8. India Daly, 9. Laura Cairns, 10. Abby Moyles, 11. Niamh Marley, 12. Emma Jordan, 13. Kelly McCormill, 14. Maeve Liston, 15. Ella Durkan.; Replacements: 16. Bronach Cassidy, 17. Megan Brodie, 18. Brittany Hogan, 19. Stacey Sloan, 20. Brenda Barr, 21. Rachael McIlroy, 22. Toni Macartney, 23. Megan Edwards.

==== 3rd-4th place playoff ====
2 September 2023	Connacht	14-36	Ulster	Musgrave Park, Cork
14:00	Try: Brady; Dixon; Con: Fowley (2)	Report	Try: McIlroy; Daley; Durkan; Cregan; Marley; O'Connell; Con: Durkan (3)
Ulster: 1. Ava Fannin, 2. Beth Cregan (c), 3. Aisling O'Connell, 4. Keelin Brady, 5. Taryn Schitzler, 6. India Daley, 7. Maebh Clenaghan, 8. Brittany Hogan, 9. Rachael McIlroy, 10. Abby Moyles, 11. Niamh Marley, 12. Kelly McCormill, 13. Peita McAlister, 14. Maeve Liston, 15. Ella Durkan.; Replacements: 16. Bronach Cassidy (for Cregan 71'), 17. Megan Simpson (for Brodie 71'), 18. Megan Brodie (for O'Connell 29), 19. Stacey Sloan (for Hogan 40'), 20. Brenda Barr (for Sloan 71'), 21. Laura Cairns (for McIlroy 52'), 22. Toni Macartney (for Moyles 66'), 23. Megan Edwards (for Liston 71').

=== 2023–24 Celtic Challenge ===
Two Irish teams were entered in this year's Celtic Challenge competition - the Wolfhounds, a combined Ulster-Leinster team, and the Clovers, a combined Munster-Connacht team. Ulster players selected for the Wolfhounds are Ella Durkan, Niamh Marley, Kelly McCormill, Sophie Barrett, Maebh Clenaghan, India Daley, Brittany Hogan, Fiona Tuite, Claire Boles and Abby Moyles. One Ulster player, Sadhbh McGrath, was selected for the Clovers. The Wolfhounds finished top of the table with five wins out of five; the Clovers finished third with three wins and two losses.

== Senior club rugby ==
=== All-Ireland League ===
Ballynahinch finished 5th and City of Armagh 8th in Division 1A. Queen's University were 9th in Division 1B, and avoided relegation via the playoffs. Banbridge were 4th, Ballymena 7th, and Malone were relegated after finishing 10th in Division 2A. Instonians were promoted for the second season in a row after topping Division 2B, while Dungannon were 5th, Rainey 7th, and Belfast Harlequins were relegated after finishing 10th. Clogher Valley topped Division 2C, achieving promotion in their first AIL season, Omagh Academicals were eighth, and Bangor went into the relegation playoffs after finishing 9th. Ballyclare were promoted to the AIL for the first time after finishing top the Ulster Championship and winning the playoff final against Leinster League champions Monkstown. Monkstown were also promoted in place of Bangor, who lost the relegation playoff.

=== Ulster Rugby Premiership ===
The Ulster Rugby Premiership ran in August and September 2023. Division 1 consisted of eight teams in two pools of four. Teams in each pool played each other once, and the winners of each pool played each other in the final on 16 September. The bottom two teams played in a playoff, the winner of which qualified for the Ulster Senior Cup, along with the other six Division 1 teams. The loser would be entered into the new Senior Shield. Division 2 consisted of five teams who played each other once. The team that finished top also qualified for the Senior Cup.

==== Division 1A ====
	Team	P	W	D	L	Pts	Status
1	Ballynahinch	3	3	0	0	15	Champions
2	Queen's University	3	2	0	1	10	Senior Cup
3	Dungannon	3	1	0	2	5	Senior Cup
4	Banbridge	3	0	0	3	1	Senior Cup

==== Division 1B ====
	Team	P	W	D	L	Pts	Status
1	City of Armagh	3	2	0	1	11	Senior Cup
2	Rainey	3	1	1	1	8	Senior Cup
3	Malone	3	1	1	1	7	Senior Cup
4	Ballymena	3	1	0	2	4	Senior Shield

==== Final ====
16 September 2023	Ballynahinch	38–17	City of Armagh	Ballymacarn Park
		Report		Referee: Stuart Douglas

==== 7th/8th place playoff ====
16 September 2023	Ballymena	19–29	Banbridge	Eaton Park
		Report		Referee: Daniel Carson

==== Division 2 ====
	Team	P	W	D	L	Pts	Status
1	Instonians	4	4	0	0	18	Senior Cup
2	Clogher Valley	4	3	0	1	16	
3	Omagh Academicals	4	1	1	2	6	
4	Bangor	4	1	0	3	5	
5	Belfast Harlequins	4	1	0	3	4	

=== Ulster Senior Cup ===
Quarter-finals
23 September 2023
Malone	8
City of Armagh	19
23 December 2023
Ballynahinch	21
Instonians	22
23 September 2023
Dungannon	27
Banbridge	36
23 September 2023
Queen's University	40
Rainey	24

Semi-finals
9 March 2023
City of Armagh	21
Instonians	22
9 March 2023
Banbridge	21
Queen's University	22

Final
4 May 2024
Instonians	36
Queen's University	26

=== Ulster Senior Shield ===
Semi-finals
1 February 2024
Belfast Harlequins	21
Ballymena	24
3 February 2024
Omagh Academicals	17
Clogher Valley	48

Final
13 April 2024
Ballymena	22
Clogher Valley	31
