= 2021–22 European Rugby Champions Cup pool stage =

The 2021–22 European Rugby Champions Cup pool stage was the first stage of the 27th season of European club rugby union, and the eighth under the European Rugby Champions Cup format. Due to the COVID-19 pandemic delaying the end of the 2019–20 tournament, twenty-four clubs from the three major European domestic and regional leagues competed in the Champions Cup on a one-year exceptional basis.

Several round 2 matches between teams from France and the UK were postponed. This was due to new travel restrictions between the UK and France introduced by the French government on 18 December 2021. This resulted in multiple 0–0 draws and 2 match points given to each team.

Locations
Locations of teams of the 2021–22 European Rugby Champions Cup group stage.
Red: Pool A; Blue: Pool B.

== Seeding ==
For the purposes of the pool draw, the 24 clubs were separated into tiers based on their league finishing position, and clubs from the same league in the same tier were not drawn into the same pool. The number 1 and number 2 ranked clubs from each league are in Tier 1, the number 3 and number 4 ranked clubs are in Tier 2, the number 5 and 6 ranked clubs are in Tier 3, and the number 7 and number 8 ranked clubs are in Tier 4.

Pool play will feature the Tier 1 teams playing the Tier 4 teams in their pool (that are not from the same league) twice in a home and away manner, while the Tier 2 and 3 clubs will follow in a similar manner.

The four teams from each pool with the best points will qualify for the knockout stage. Teams finishing 5th through 8th after pool play will join the Challenge Cup at the round of 16 stage (joining eight qualifiers from the Challenge Cup pool stage) In total, eight weekends of play will be provided for, one less than in previous seasons.

| Tier | Rank | Top 14 | Premiership | United Rugby Championship (Pro14) |
|---|---|---|---|---|
| 1 | 1 | (France) Toulouse | (England) Harlequins | (Ireland) Leinster |
| 1 | 2 | (France) La Rochelle | (England) Exeter Chiefs | (Ireland) Munster |
| 2 | 3 | (France) Racing 92 | (England) Bristol Bears | (Ireland) Ulster |
| 2 | 4 | (France) Bordeaux Bègles | (England) Sale Sharks | (Ireland) Connacht |
| 3 | 5 | (France) Clermont | (England) Northampton Saints | (Wales) Scarlets |
| 3 | 6 | (France) Stade Français | (England) Leicester Tigers | (Wales) Ospreys |
| 4 | 7 | (France) Castres | (England) Bath | (Wales) Cardiff |
| 4 | 8 | (France) Montpellier | (England) Wasps | (Scotland) Glasgow Warriors |

== Pool stage ==
The draw took place on 21 July 2021, at the Lausanne, Switzerland.

Teams in the same pool play two other teams twice, at home and away, in the group stage. The top eight teams in each pool progress to the round of 16, with the teams ranked 9-11 progressing to the 2021–22 European Rugby Challenge Cup round of 16.

Teams are awarded group points based on match performances. Four points are awarded for a win, two points for a draw, one attacking bonus point for scoring four or more tries in a match and one defensive bonus point for losing a match by seven points or fewer.

In the event of a tie between two or more teams, the following tie-breakers are used, as directed by EPCR:

1. Where teams have played each other
  1. The club with the greater number of competition points from only matches involving tied teams.
  2. If equal, the club with the best aggregate points difference from those matches.
  3. If equal, the club that scored the most tries in those matches.
2. Where teams remain tied and/or have not played each other in the competition (i.e. are from different pools)
  1. The club with the best aggregate points difference from the pool stage.
  2. If equal, the club that scored the most tries in the pool stage.
  3. If equal, the club with the fewest players suspended in the pool stage.
  4. If equal, the drawing of lots will determine a club's ranking.

Key to colours
| Top 8 in each pool, advance to round of 16. |
| Teams ranked 9th–11th in each pool advance to 2021–22 European Rugby Challenge Cup round of 16 |

(Q) denotes the team has qualified for the Champions Cup quarter-finals

(q) denotes the team has qualified for the Challenge Cup quarter-finals

=== Pool A ===
Pool A Standings
| Team | P | W | D | L | PF | PA | Diff | TF | TA | TB | LB | Pts |
|---|---|---|---|---|---|---|---|---|---|---|---|---|
| (France) Racing 92 | 4 | 4 | 0 | 0 | 126 | 24 | +102 | 16 | 3 | 3 | 0 | 19 |
| (Ireland) Ulster | 4 | 4 | 0 | 0 | 114 | 96 | +18 | 15 | 9 | 3 | 0 | 19 |
| (France) La Rochelle | 4 | 3 | 1 | 0 | 97 | 64 | +33 | 11 | 7 | 2 | 0 | 16 |
| (Ireland) Leinster | 4 | 3 | 0 | 1 | 198 | 62 | +136 | 30 | 8 | 3 | 0 | 15 |
| (England) Sale Sharks | 4 | 2 | 1 | 1 | 89 | 48 | +41 | 13 | 5 | 1 | 1 | 12 |
| (England) Exeter Chiefs | 4 | 2 | 0 | 2 | 127 | 82 | +45 | 19 | 7 | 3 | 0 | 11 |
| (France) Montpellier | 4 | 2 | 0 | 2 | 78 | 157 | –79 | 9 | 23 | 2 | 0 | 10 |
| (France) Clermont | 4 | 1 | 1 | 2 | 79 | 82 | –3 | 8 | 10 | 0 | 2 | 8 |
| (Scotland) Glasgow Warriors | 4 | 1 | 0 | 3 | 82 | 117 | –35 | 7 | 15 | 0 | 1 | 5 |
| (England) Northampton Saints | 4 | 0 | 0 | 4 | 56 | 124 | –68 | 6 | 17 | 0 | 2 | 2 |
| (England) Bath | 4 | 0 | 1 | 3 | 48 | 148 | –100 | 6 | 22 | 0 | 0 | 2 |
| (Wales) Ospreys | 4 | 0 | 0 | 4 | 33 | 123 | –90 | 3 | 17 | 0 | 0 | 0 |

==== Round 1 ====
10 December 2021
20:00

| Northampton Saints (England) | 14–45 | (France) Racing 92 (1 BP) |
| Try: Skosan 29' c Dingwall 48' c Con: Biggar (1/1) 30'; Furbank (1/1) 49' | Report | Try: Lauret (3) 8' c, 42' c, 64' c Imhoff (2) 23' c, 37' m Con: Machenaud (4/5) 9', 24', 43', 65'; Pen: Machenaud (4/4) 3', 5', 21', 59' |

cinch Stadium at Franklin's Gardens
Attendance: 12,205
Referee: Mike Adamson (Scotland)

11 December 2021
15:15

| (1 BP) Leinster (Ireland) | 45–20 | (England) Bath |
| Try: Gibson-Park (2) 5' m, 29' m Furlong 12' c Lowe 18' c Keenan 25' c Kelleher 48' c van der Flier 58' c Con: R. Byrne (5/7) 13', 19', 25', 49', 59' | Report | Try: du Toit 38' c Hamer-Webb 79' c Con: Bailey (2/2) 39', 79'; Pen: Bailey (2/2) 3', 15' |

Aviva Stadium
Attendance: 25,403
Referee: Pierre Brousset (France)

11 December 2021
18:30

| (1 BP) Clermont (France) | 23–29 | (Ireland) Ulster |
| Try: Penaud (2) 35' c, 57' c Con: Hanrahan (2/2) 35', 59'; Pen: Hanrahan (3/4) 40'+1, 63', 80'+1 | Report | Try: McCloskey 26' c Timoney 68' c Con: Cooney (2/2) 28', 69'; Pen: Cooney (5/5) 2', 7', 14', 38', 74' |

Stade Marcel-Michelin
Attendance: 14,443
Referee: Wayne Barnes (England)

11 December 2021
20:00

| (1 BP) Exeter Chiefs (England) | 42–6 | (France) Montpellier |
| Try: Hogg 24' c Gray (3) 42' c, 53' c, 60' c S. Simmonds 71' c Armand 80'+1 c Con: J. Simmonds (6/6) 25', 43', 54', 62', 73', 80'+2 | Report | Pen: Foursans-Bourdette (2/2) 4', 11' |

Sandy Park
Attendance: 9,577
Referee: Craig Evans (Wales)

12 December 2021
13:00

| Ospreys (Wales) | 13–21 | (England) Sale Sharks |
| Try: Morgan 50' c Con: Thomas (1/1) 51'; Pen: Anscombe (1/1) 10'; Thomas (1/1) 61' | Report | Try: Janse van Rensburg 3' c Ashman 13' c J. du Preez 26' c Con: MacGinty (3/3) 4', 13', 26' |

Swansea.com Stadium
Attendance: 4,664
Referee: Andrea Piardi (Italy)

12 December 2021
16:15

| La Rochelle (France) | 20–13 | (Scotland) Glasgow Warriors (1 BP) |
| Try: Wardi 31' c Buliruarua 58' c Con: West (2/2) 33', 59'; Pen: West (2/3) 39', 62' | Report | Try: Steyn 51' c Con: Thompson (1/1) 52'; Pen: Thompson (2/3) 8', 15' |

Stade Marcel-Deflandre
Attendance: 6,801
Referee: Matthew Carley (England)

==== Round 2 ====
17 December 2021
20:00

| (1 BP) Ulster (Ireland) | 27–22 | (England) Northampton Saints (1 BP) |
| Try: Herring 2' c Penalty try 16'; McIlroy 20' m Gilroy 58' m Con: Cooney (1/3) 3'; Pen: Cooney (1/1) 46' | Report | Try: Mitchell 61' m Skosan 79' m Pen: Furbank (4/4) 7', 19', 23', 30' |

Kingspan Stadium
Attendance: 14,712
Referee: Andrea Piardi (Italy)

17 December 2021
21:00

| (1 BP) Montpellier (France) | Cancelled; 28–0 | (Ireland) Leinster |

Altrad Stadium
Referee: Wayne Barnes (England)

- Montpellier awarded the 5 match points and a 28–0 victory following COVID cases within the Leinster team.

18 December 2021
13:00

| Bath (England) | Cancelled; 0–0 | (France) La Rochelle |

Recreation Ground
Referee: Craig Evans (Wales)

- Initially postponed (with the intent to reschedule) due to travel restrictions between UK and France, but later cancelled with a 0–0 draw verdict and 2 match points to each team.

18 December 2021
15:15

| Sale Sharks (England) | Cancelled; 0–0 | (France) Clermont |

AJ Bell Stadium
Referee: Frank Murphy (Ireland)

- Initially postponed (with the intent to reschedule) due to travel restrictions between UK and France, but later cancelled with a 0–0 draw verdict and 2 match points to each team.

18 December 2021
18:30

| (1 BP) Racing 92 (France) | Cancelled; 28–0 | (Wales) Ospreys |

Paris La Défense Arena
Referee: Luke Pearce (England)

- Racing 92 awarded the 5 match points and a 28–0 victory following COVID cases within the Ospreys team.

18 December 2021
17:30

| Glasgow Warriors (Scotland) | 22–7 | (England) Exeter Chiefs |
| Try: Matthews 78' c Con: Weir (1/1) 80+1'; Pen: Thompson (5/6) 13', 48', 52', 60', 75' | Report | Try: Simmonds 70' c Con: Simmonds (1/1) 71' |

Scotstoun Stadium
Attendance: 7,246
Referee: Andrew Brace (Ireland)

==== Round 3 ====
15 January 2022
15:15

| Ospreys (Wales) | 10–25 | (France) Racing 92 |
| Try: K. Williams 20' m Con: Anscombe (1/1) 21'; Pen: Anscombe (1/2) 31' | Report | Try: Imhoff 33' m Vakatawa 57' c Thomas 71' c Con: Gibert (2/2) 58', 72'; Pen: Machenaud (1/1) 6'; Russell (1/1) 56' |

Swansea.com Stadium
Attendance: 0
Referee: Christophe Ridley (England)

15 January 2022
18:30

| (1 BP) La Rochelle (France) | 39–21 | (England) Bath |
| Try: Danty 17' c Picquette (2) 23' c, 43' m Leyds 51' c Rhule 55' c Con: Popelin (4/5) 18', 24', 52', 56'; Pen: Popelin (2/2) 8', 13' | Report | Try: Jonker 57' c Simpson 60' c McConnochie 63' c Con: B. Spencer (3/3) 58', 61', 64' |

Stade Marcel-Deflandre
Attendance: 5,000
Referee: Craig Evans (Wales)

15 January 2022
17:30

| Exeter Chiefs (England) | 52–17 | (Scotland) Glasgow Warriors |
| Try: O'Flaherty (3) 18' c, 56' c, 65' m S. Simmonds (2) 24' c, 51' c Cowan-Dickie 59' m Nowell 74' c Ewers 77' c Con: Simmonds (4/6) 19', 25', 52', 57'; Slade (2/2) 75', 78' | Report | Try: McDonald 31' c M. Fagerson 44' c Con: Thompson (2/2) 32', 46'; Pen: Thompson (1/1) 7' |

Sandy Park
Attendance: 11,841
Referee: Romain Poite (France(

16 January 2022
13:00

| (1 BP) Leinster (Ireland) | 89–7 | (France) Montpellier |
| Try: Conan (2) 2' c, 75' c R. Byrne 13' c Gibson-Park 8' c Molony 23' c Alaalatoa 33' c Larmour 38' m Van der Flier (2) 43' c, 50' c J. O'Brien 45' c Sheehan (2) 64' c, 68' c Lowe 80' c Con: R. Byrne (7/8) 4', 10', 14', 24', 35', 44', 46'; Sexton (5/5) 51', 65', 70', 75', 80' | Report | Try: Dakuwaqa 26' c Con: Foursans (1/1) 27' |

RDS Arena
Attendance: 5,000
Referee: Wayne Barnes (England)

16 January 2022
15:15

| (1 BP) Northampton Saints (England) | 20–24 | (Ireland) Ulster (1 BP) |
| Try: Biggar 36' c Hutchinson 79' c Con: Biggar (1/1) 37'; Furbank (1/1) 79'; Pen: Biggar (2/2) 19', 43' | Report | Try: Baloucoune 6' m Doak 13' c Lowry (2) 14', 40'; Con: Doak (2/3) 14', 40' |

cinch Stadium at Franklin's Gardens
Attendance: 13,271
Referee: Pierre Brousset (France)

16 January 2022
18:30

| Clermont (France) | 25–19 | (England) Sale Sharks (1 BP) |
| Try: Lee 12' c Raka 22' m Penaud 39' c Con: Lopez (2/3) 13', 40'; Pen: Lopez (2/2) 68', 73' | Report | Try: JL. du Preez 5' m Roebuck 25' c Rodd 32' c Con: R. du Preez (2/3) 27', 33' |

Stade Marcel-Michelin
Attendance: 5,000
Referee: Frank Murphy (Ireland)

==== Round 4 ====
22 January 2022
13:00

| Bath (England) | 7–64 | (Ireland) Leinster (1 BP) |
| Try: Clark 32' c Con: Bailey (1/1) 33' | Report | Try: J. O'Brien (4) 14' m, 34' c, 48' m, 75' c Van der Flier 22' c Larmour 29' c Frawley 40+1' c Porter 46' c Keenan 51' m Sheehan 69' c Con: Sexton (5/8) 23', 30', 36', 40+1', 46'; R. Byrne (2/2) 70', 76' |

Recreation Ground
Attendance: 13,761
Referee: Andrea Piardi (Italy)

22 January 2022
17:30

| (1 BP) Ulster (Ireland) | 34–31 | (France) Clermont (1 BP) |
| Try: Herring (2) 7' m, 38' c Lowry 22' m Vermeulen 49' c Baloucoune 65' c Con: Doak (2/4) 40', 50'; Burns (1/1) 67'; Pen: Doak (1/1) 45' | Report | Try: van Tonder 69' m Raka 72' c Cancoriet 75' c Con: Lopez (2/3) 73', 76'; Pen: Parra (4/4) 12', 18', 25', 35' |

Kingspan Stadium
Attendance: 12,000
Referee: Luke Pearce (England)

22 January 2022
20:00

| Glasgow Warriors (Scotland) | 30–38 | (France) La Rochelle (1 BP) |
| Try: McKay 41' c Smith (2) 74' c, 80' c Con: Thompson (1/1) 41'; Weir (2/2) 75', 80+1'; Pen: Thompson (3/3) 9', 25', 33' | Report | Try: Rhule 19' c P.A. Boudehent 40+2' m Bourgarit 45' c P.I. Boudehent 50' c Con: Popelin (3/4) 21', 46', 50'; Pen: Popelin (3/4) 10', 49', 50'; West (1/1) 77' |

Scotstoun Stadium
Attendance: 6,723
Referee: Karl Dickson (England)

23 January 2022
13:00

| (1 BP) Sale Sharks (England) | 49–10 | (Wales) Ospreys |
| Try: Roebuck (2) 13' c, 73' c Reed 28' c Ashman 44' c D. du Preez 50' c Langdon 68' c Metcalf 79' c Con: MacGinty (4/4) 14', 29', 47', 52'; R. du Preez (3/3) 70', 74', 79' | Report | Try: Deaves 57' c Con: Hawkins (1/1) 58'; Pen: Hawkins (1/1) 38' |

AJ Bell Stadium
Attendance: 4,000
Referee: Pierre Brousset (France)

23 January 2022
16:15

| Racing 92 (France) | Cancelled; 28–0 | (England) Northampton Saints |

Paris La Défense Arena
Referee: Nika Amashukeli (Georgia)

- Racing 92 awarded the 5 match points and a 28–0 victory following COVID cases within the Northampton Saints team.

23 January 2022
18:30

| (1 BP) Montpellier (France) | 37–26 | (England) Exeter Chiefs (1 BP) |
| Try: Bouthier 12' c Willemse 17' c Serfontein 21' c Reinach 69' c Con: Foursans (3/3) 13', 19', 23'; Garbisi (1/1) 70'; Pen: Foursans (2/2) 29', 66'; Garbisi (1/1) 80' | | Try: S. Simmonds (3) 3' m, 32' c, 49' c O'Brien 35' c Con: J. Simmonds (3/4) 33', 36', 51' |

Altrad Stadium
Attendance: 5,000
Referee: Frank Murphy (Ireland)

=== Pool B ===
Pool B Standings
| Team | P | W | D | L | PF | PA | Diff | TF | TA | TB | LB | Pts |
|---|---|---|---|---|---|---|---|---|---|---|---|---|
| (England) Leicester Tigers | 4 | 4 | 0 | 0 | 102 | 64 | +38 | 14 | 7 | 3 | 0 | 19 |
| (England) Harlequins | 4 | 4 | 0 | 0 | 135 | 101 | +34 | 18 | 15 | 3 | 0 | 19 |
| (Ireland) Munster | 4 | 4 | 0 | 0 | 115 | 47 | +68 | 12 | 5 | 2 | 0 | 18 |
| (England) Bristol Bears | 4 | 3 | 1 | 0 | 108 | 38 | +70 | 16 | 4 | 3 | 0 | 17 |
| (Ireland) Connacht | 4 | 1 | 0 | 3 | 118 | 104 | +14 | 16 | 14 | 3 | 3 | 10 |
| (France) Bordeaux | 4 | 1 | 1 | 2 | 58 | 54 | +4 | 8 | 7 | 1 | 1 | 8 |
| (France) Toulouse | 4 | 1 | 1 | 2 | 61 | 65 | –4 | 8 | 8 | 1 | 0 | 7 |
| (France) Stade Français | 4 | 1 | 1 | 2 | 63 | 95 | –32 | 7 | 14 | 1 | 0 | 7 |
| (Wales) Cardiff | 4 | 1 | 0 | 3 | 85 | 118 | –33 | 13 | 16 | 2 | 1 | 7 |
| (England) Wasps | 4 | 1 | 1 | 2 | 51 | 102 | –51 | 6 | 13 | 0 | 0 | 6 |
| (France) Castres | 4 | 0 | 0 | 4 | 77 | 91 | –14 | 9 | 9 | 1 | 4 | 5 |
| (Wales) Scarlets | 4 | 0 | 1 | 3 | 31 | 125 | –94 | 4 | 19 | 0 | 0 | 2 |

==== Round 1 ====
12 December 2021
13:00

| Cardiff (Wales) | 7–39 | (France) Toulouse (1 BP) |
| Try: Adams 20' c Con: Tovey (1/1) 21' | Report | Try: Jelonch 24' c Ahki 38' c Dupont 56' c Bonneval 66' m Tekori 75' c Con: Ntamack (4/5) 25', 39', 57', 77'; Pen: Ntamack (2/3) 8', 16' |

Cardiff Arms Park
Attendance: 10,107
Referee: Karl Dickson (England)

11 December 2021
16:15

| (1 BP) Bordeaux Bègles (France) | 13–16 | (England) Leicester Tigers |
| Try: Dubié 40'+1 c Con: Lucu (1/1) 40'+2; Pen: Lucu (2/3) 3', 53' | Report | Try: Porter 21' c Con: Ford (1/1) 22'; Pen: Ford (3/4) 17', 69', 77' |

Stade Chaban-Delmas
Attendance: 22,383
Referee: Andrew Brace (Ireland)

11 December 2021
17:30

| (1 BP) Bristol Bears (England) | Cancelled; 28–0 | (Wales) Scarlets |

Ashton Gate
Referee: Mathieu Raynal (France)

- Due to the Scarlets team having to isolate following trip to South Africa, Scarlets had to forfeit the match on safety grounds, meaning Bristol were awarded 5 match points and a 28–0 victory.

12 December 2021
13:00

| (1 BP) Connacht (Ireland) | 36–9 | (France) Stade Français |
| Try: Blade 11' c Porch 28' m Wootton 40' c Masterson 70' c Kilgallen 73' m Prendergast 80'+1 m Con: Carty (3/6) 11', 40'+1, 71' | Report | Pen: Sanchez (3/3) 15', 18', 48' |

Galway Sportsgrounds
Attendance: 5,277
Referee: Luke Pearce (England)

12 December 2021
15:15

| Wasps (England) | 14–35 | (Ireland) Munster (1 BP) |
| Try: Barbeary 31' c Le Bourgeois 64' c Con: Gopperth (2/2) 32', 65' | Report | Try: Earls 35' c Campbell 43' m Conway 48' c Buckley 57' c Con: Carbery (3/4) 36', 49', 57'; Pen: Carbery (3/4) 7', 28', 67' |

Coventry Building Society Arena
Attendance: 6,716
Referee: Romain Poite (France)

12 December 2021
18:30

| (1 BP) Castres (France) | 18–20 | (England) Harlequins |
| Try: Raisuqe 18' m Laveau 75' c Con: Urdapilleta (1/2) 76'; Pen: Urdapilleta (2/2) 37', 39' | Report | Try: Lynagh 32' c Dombrandt 51' c Con: Smith (2/2) 33', 52'; Pen: Smith (2/3) 47', 74' |

Stade Pierre-Fabre
Attendance: 8,625
Referee: Nika Amashukeli (Georgia)

==== Round 2 ====
18 December 2021
13:00

| (1 BP) Harlequins (England) | 43–17 | (Wales) Cardiff |
| Try: Care 9' c Smith 18' c Dombrandt (2) 57' c, 67' m Marchant 62' c Esterhuizen 77' c Con: Smith (5/6) 10', 19', 59', 64', 79'; Pen: Smith (1/1) 28' | Report | Try: Winnett 4' c Botham 16' m Cabango 33' m Con: Williams (1/3) 5' |

Twickenham Stoop
Attendance: 14,000
Referee: Frank Murphy (Ireland)

18 December 2021
20:00

| Munster (Ireland) | 19–13 | (France) Castres (1 BP) |
| Try: O'Donoghue 57' c Con: Healy (1/1) 58'; Pen: Healy (4/5) 7', 28', 34', 69' | Report | Try: Kornath 76' c Con: Urdapilleta (1/1) 77'; Pen: Urdapilleta (2/3) 39', 62' |

Thomond Park
Attendance: 21,250
Referee: Matthew Carley (England)

19 December 2021
13:00

| Scarlets (Wales) | Cancelled; 0–0 | (France) Bordeaux Bègles |

Parc y Scarlets
Referee: Christophe Ridley (England)

- Initially postponed (with the intent to reschedule) due to travel restrictions between UK and France, but later cancelled with a 0–0 draw verdict and 2 match points to each team.

19 December 2021
13:00

| (1 BP) Leicester Tigers (England) | 29–23 | (Ireland) Connacht (1 BP) |
| Try: Dolly 17' m Hegarty 22' c Steward 56' c Saumaki 62' c Con: Burns (1/2) 23'; Hegarty (2/2) 57', 63'; Pen: Hegarty (1/1) 70' | Report | Try: Porch 26' c Carty 39' c Con: Carty (2/2) 27', 40'; Pen: Carty (2/2) 4', 47' |

Mattioli Woods Welford Road
Attendance: 17,222
Referee: Mike Adamson (Scotland)

19 December 2021
16:15

| Toulouse (France) | Cancelled; 0–0 | (England) Wasps |

Stade Ernest-Wallon
Referee: Mike Adamson (Scotland)

- Initially postponed (with the intent to reschedule) due to travel restrictions between UK and France, but later cancelled with a 0–0 draw verdict and 2 match points to each team.

19 December 2021
18:30

| Stade Français (France) | Cancelled; 0–0 | (England) Bristol Bears |

Stade Jean-Bouin
Referee: Andrew Brace (Ireland)

- Initially postponed (with the intent to reschedule) due to travel restrictions between UK and France, but later cancelled with a 0–0 draw verdict and 2 match points to each team.

==== Round 3 ====
14 January 2022
21:00

| (1 BP) Castres (France) | 13–16 | (Ireland) Munster |
| Try: Larregain 27' c Con: Botica (1/1) 28'; Pen: Botica (2/2) 54', 66' | Report | Try: G. Coombes 77'; Con: Crowley (1/1) 79'; Pen: Crowley (3/3) 10', 46', 49' |

Stade Pierre-Fabre
Attendance: 5,000
Referee: Luke Pearce (England)

14 January 2022
20:00

| (2 BP) Cardiff (Wales) | 33–36 | (England) Harlequins (1 BP) |
| Try: Lane (2) 11' c, 55' m Ratti 18' c Lewis 52' c Domachowski 55' m Con: J. Evans (4/5) 12', 18', 53', 56' | Report | Try: Lynagh 6' c Green 40' m Northmore 46' c Care 60' c Smith 75' c Con: Smith (4/5) 7', 48', 61', 76'; Pen: Smith (1/1) 80' |

Cardiff Arms Park
Attendance: 0
Referee: Tual Trainini (France)

15 January 2022
13:00

| Wasps (England) | 30–22 | (France) Toulouse |
| Try: Alo 18' c Shields 22' c Barbeary 67' c Con: Gopperth (3/3) 18', 24', 68'; Pen: Gopperth (3/4) 42', 55', 79' | Report | Try: Cros 1' c Mauvaka 60' m Meafou 80' c Con: Ramos (2/3) 2', 80'; Pen: Ramos (1/1) 33' |

Coventry Building Society Arena
Attendance: 8,000
Referee: Chris Busby (Ireland)

15 January 2022
15:15

| (2 BP) Connacht (Ireland) | 28–29 | (England) Leicester Tigers (1 BP) |
| Try: O'Halloran (2) 15' c, 48'; Prendergast 27' c Marmion 43' c Con: Carty (4/4) 16', 27', 44', 59' | Report | Try: Heyes 2' m Murimurivalu (2) 9' m, 55' c Clare 71' m Saumaki 79' c Con: Burns (2/5) 56', 72' |

Galway Sportsgrounds
Attendance: 3,064
Referee: Mathieu Raynal (France)

15 January 2022
20:00

| (1 BP) Bristol Bears (England) | 28–17 | (France) Stade Français |
| Try: Purdy 14' c O'Conor (2) 23' c, 59' c Randall 49' c Con: Sheedy (4/4) 15', 24', 50', 60' | Report | Try: Barré 40' c Burban 65' c Con: Sánchez (2/2) 40', 66'; Pen: Sánchez (1/2) 47' |

Ashton Gate
Attendance: 14,828
Referee: Andrew Brace (Ireland)

16 January 2022
16:15

| (1 BP) Bordeaux Bègles (France) | 45–10 | (Wales) Scarlets |
| Try: Woki 20' c Bielle-Biarrey (3) 26' c, 46' m, 73' c Cros 29' c Lamothe 57' c Ducuing 63' m Con: Jalibert (3/4) 21', 27', 30'; Bielle-Biarrey (1/2) 58'; Cordero (1/1) 74' | Report | Try: L. Williams 51' m G. Davies 61' c |

Stade Chaban-Delmas
Attendance: 5,000
Referee: Karl Dickson (England)

==== Round 4 ====
21 January 2022
20:00

| (1 BP) Harlequins (England) | 36–33 | (France) Castres (2 BP) |
| Try: Dombrandt (3) 13' m, 42' c, 80+3' c Jones 22' c Taulani 27' c Con: Allan (3/4) 22', 28', 43'; Smith (1/1) 80+6'; Pen: Allan (1/1) 39' | Report | Try: Barlot 2' m Zeghdar 9' m Kockott 34' c Nakosi 50' m Cocagi 61' m Con: Botica (1/5) 35'; Pen: Botica (2/2) 1', 20' |

Twickenham Stoop
Attendance: 14,800
Referee: Mike Adamson (Scotland)

22 January 2022
14:00

| Toulouse (France) | Cancelled; 0–28 | (Wales) Cardiff (1 BP) |

Stade Ernest-Wallon
Referee: Tom Foley (England)

- Cardiff were awarded the 5 match points and a 28–0 victory following COVID cases within the Toulouse team.

22 January 2022
15:15

| Leicester Tigers (England) | Cancelled; 28–0 | (France) Bordeaux Bègles |

Mattioli Woods Welford Road
Referee: Andrew Brace (Ireland)

- Leicester were awarded the 5 match points and a 28–0 victory following COVID cases within the Bordeaux Bègles team.

22 January 2022
17:30

| Scarlets (Wales) | 21–52 | (England) Bristol Bears (1 BP) |
| Try: Elias 22' c McNicholl 69' m Con: Patchell (1/1) 23'; Pen: Patchell (3/3) 6', 29', 43' | Report | Try: Radradra (2) 10' c, 79' m Lloyd 16' c Thacker 62' c O'Conor 68' c Naulago 69' m Sheedy 76' c Con: Sheedy (5/7) 11', 17', 63', 68', 76' |

Parc y Scarlets
Attendance: 8,567
Referee: Mathieu Raynal (France)

23 January 2022
14:00

| (1 BP) Stade Français (France) | 37–31 | (Ireland) Connacht (2 BP) |
| Try: Lapegue (2) 18' c, 73' c Laumape 41' m Hamdaoui 51' m Chapuis 67' c Con: Sánchez (1/3) 20'; Segonds (2/2) 68', 74' | Report | Try: Wootton 6' c Blade 37' c Farrell 47' c Butler 60' c Con: Carty (4/4) 7', 38', 48', 60'; Pen: Carty (1/1) 23' |

Stade Jean-Bouin
Attendance: 5,000
Referee: Wayne Barnes (England)

23 January 2022
15:15

| (1 BP) Munster (Ireland) | 45–7 | (England) Wasps |
| Try: Murray 8' c Zebo (2) 17' c, 78' c O'Donoghue 29' c Loughman 43' c Scannell 80+2' c Con: Healy (4/4) 9', 18', 30', 44'; Crowley (2/2) 79', 80+3'; Pen: Healy (1/1) 15' | Report | Try: Robson 26' c Con: Atkinson (1/1) 26' |

Thomond Park
Attendance: 13,047
Referee: Tual Trainini (France)
