= Dan Soper =

New Zealand rugby union coach

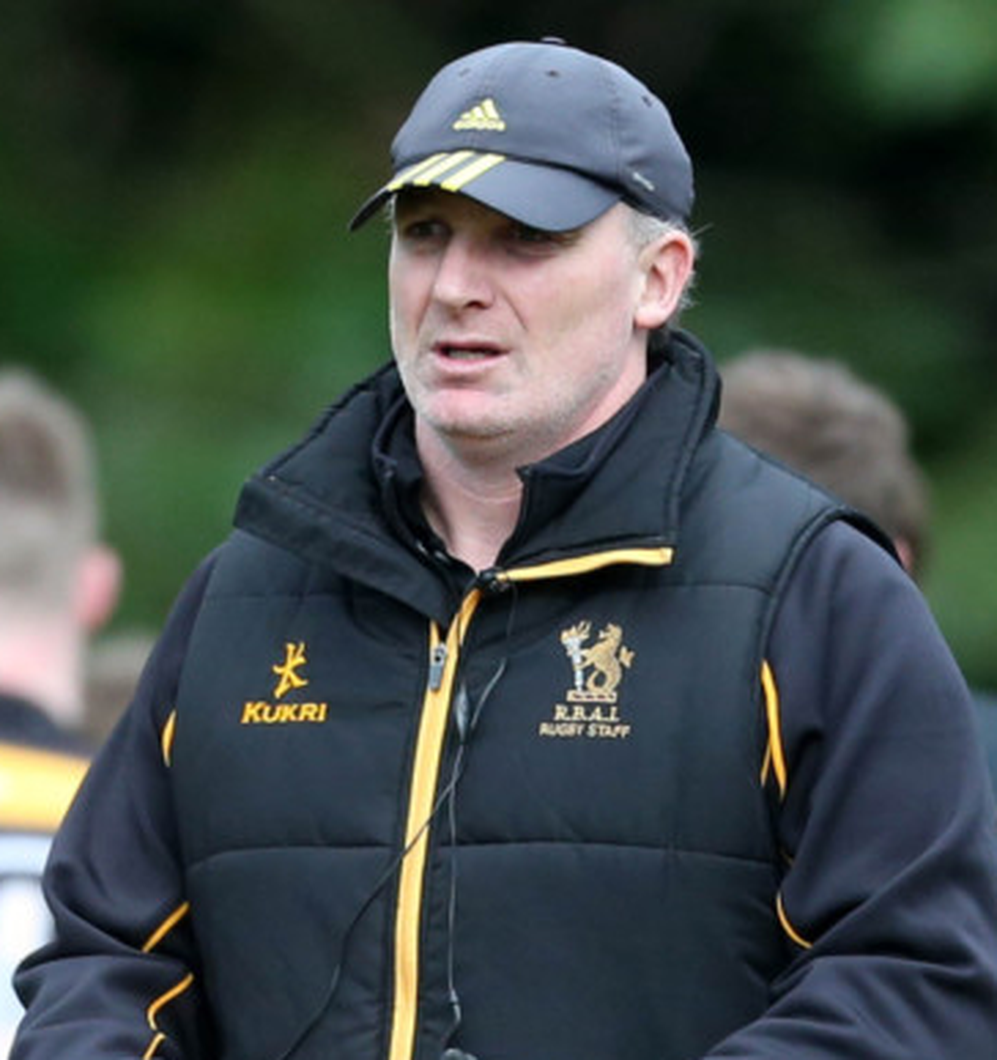
- Born: 1977 (age 48–49); Alexandra, New Zealand
- Education: University of Otago (BA)
- Family: Wife (Caroline) and children (Emma, Callum and Katie)
- Rugby league career

Playing information

Rugby union
Club
Years	Team	Pld	T	G	FG	P
1999–2000	Petrarca Rugby	6	0

Rugby league
- Position: Fullback
Club
Years	Team	Pld	T	G	FG	P
1997	Otago Sharks	6	1			260
	Banbridge RFC

Coaching information
Club
Years	Team	Gms	W	D	L	W%
2008–2009	Ballynahinch RFC
2018	Ulster Rugby
	Total	0	0	0	0

Daniel Soper is a rugby union coach from New Zealand who has been assistant coach at Ulster since 2021.

Born in Alexandra, he played for Otago Sharks, setting a club scoring record of 260 points in 1997, and represented North Otago in the National Provincial Championship. He first came to Northern Ireland in 1998 to play for Banbridge RFC, and had a season in Italy, playing for Petrarca Padova in the 1999–2000 Heineken Cup. Returning to Northern Ireland, he played and coached at Ballynahinch RFC and Banbridge RFC while working as a schoolteacher at Wallace High School, Lisburn, Sullivan Upper School, Ballyclare High School, and Royal Belfast Academical Institution.

In club rugby, he coached Ballynahinch to the "grand slam" of the Ulster Senior Cup, the All-Ireland Cup and the Ulster Senior League in 2009. He became head coach of Banbridge in 2010, and led them to two promotions in the All Ireland League. In schools rugby, he coached future Irish international Darren Cave at Sullivan Upper, and led the RBAI rugby team, featuring future internationals James Hume and Michael Lowry, to three consecutive Ulster Schools' Cup titles between 2015 and 2017. He also coached the Ulster under-18 schools team. He joined Ulster as skills coach ahead of the 2018–19 season, and was promoted to assistant coach, in place of the departing Dwayne Peel, before the 2021–22 season. When McFarland left midway through the 2023–24 season, Soper took charge temporarily until the end of the Six Nations Under 20s Championship, after which Ireland under-20 coach Richie Murphy would take over until the end of the season. For the 2025-26 season, he moved a transition and development role.
