= David McCann (rugby union) =

Irish rugby union player

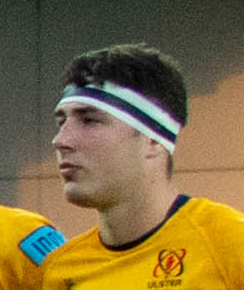
- Born: 20 June 2000 (age 26)
- Height: 1.91 m (6 ft 3 in)
- Weight: 110 kg (17 st; 240 lb)
- School: Royal Belfast Academical Institution

Rugby union career
- Position(s): Flanker, Number eight
Amateur team(s)
Years	Team	Apps	(Points)
2021-2023	Banbridge	9	(20)
Senior career
Years	Team	Apps	(Points)
2020–	Ulster	96	(110)
- Correct as of 31 October 2026
International career
Years	Team	Apps	(Points)
2019–2020	Ireland U20	9	(10)
2022	Emerging Ireland	2	(5)
2025-	Ireland A	2	(0)
- Correct as of 20 November 2026

David McCann (born 20 June 2000) is an Irish rugby union player who plays in the back row for Ulster

He attended Royal Belfast Academical Institution, with whom he won the Ulster Schools' Cup in 2016 and 2017, played club rugby with Banbridge, and joined the Ulster academy ahead of the 2018–19 season. He won Academy Player of the Year in the 2020 Ulster Rugby Awards. He captained Ulster 'A' and the Ireland under-20s. He made his senior debut for Ulster on 2 October 2020 in a 35–24 home victory against Benetton Treviso, and signed a senior contract ahead of the 2020–21 season. He was named Uster's men's player of the year and rugby writers' player of the year for the 2023-24 season in the 2024 Ulster Rugby Awards.
