= Nathan Doak =

Northern Irish rugby union player

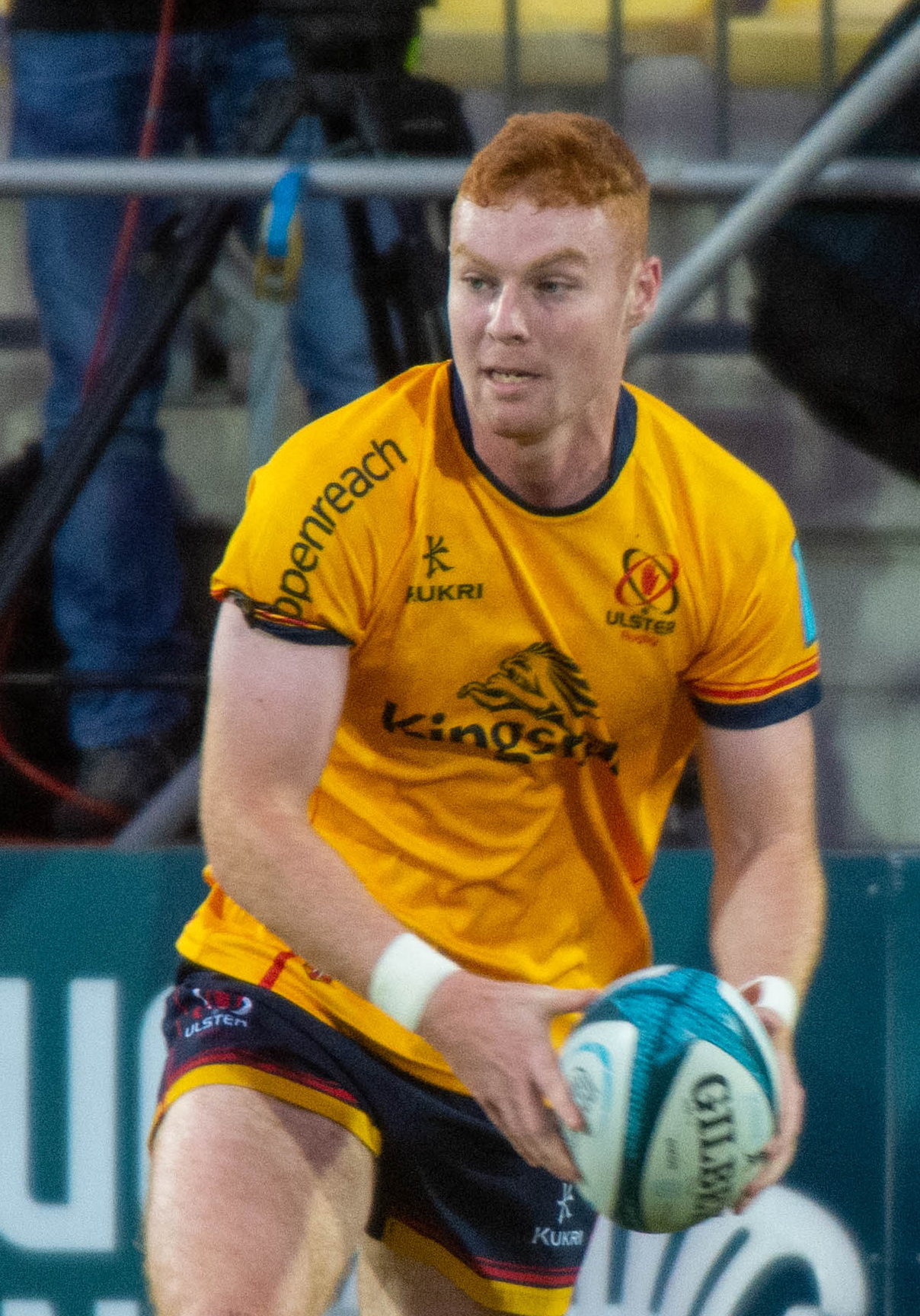
- Born: 17 December 2001 (age 24) Northern Ireland
- Height: 1.85 m (6 ft 1 in)
- Weight: 83 kg (13.1 st; 183 lb)
- School: Wallace High School
- Notable relative: Neil Doak (father)

Rugby union career
- Position: Scrum-half
Senior career
Years	Team	Apps	(Points)
2021–	Ulster	114	(498)
- Correct as of 24 October 2026
International career
Years	Team	Apps	(Points)
2021	Ireland U20	4	(58)
2022	Emerging Ireland	2	(5)
2025	Ireland A	2	(2)
2026-	Ireland	2	(0)
- Correct as of 11 July 2026

Nathan Doak (born 17 December 2001) is an Irish rugby union player who plays scrum-half and fly-half for Ulster in the United Rugby Championship and the European Rugby Champions Cup.

The son of the former Ulster scrum-half and head coach Neil Doak, his brother Cameron is also a rugby union player. He was a mascot and a ball-boy at Ravenhill as a child. He started playing rugby at Wallace High School in Lisburn, and was part of the team that shared the Ulster Schools' Cup with The Royal School, Armagh, after the final was called off due to the COVID-19 pandemic. He won the Ulster Boys' Schools Player of the Year award in 2020.

He played for Ulster A in the 2019–20 Celtic Cup, before joining the Ulster academy for the 2020–21 season. He made his Ulster debut in Round 10 of the 2020–21 Pro14 against Munster.

He signed a development contract with Ulster ahead of the 2021-22 season. He impressed in the absence of John Cooney with injury, scoring 48 points in nine appearances, and was awarded a senior contract in December. He made his first Champions Cup start against Northampton Saints in January 2022, scoring a try in a 24-20 victory. He finished the season with 23 appearances and 134 points, and was nominated for Young Men's Player of the Year in the 2022 Ulster Rugby Awards. He finished the 2022–23 season with 20 appearances and 80 points for Ulster. He unexpectedly made his 50th Ulster appearance against Glasgow Warriors in November 2023, being named on the bench at the last minute following the withdrawal of Jake Flannery, then playing most of the game at out-half after Billy Burns went off with a head injury. Since the departure of former head coach Dan McFarland and the arrival of interim head coach Richie Murphy, he has been selected more regularly at out-half.

He made his 100th appearance for Ulster in an away loss to Scarlets in the URC in January 2026.

== National team ==
Doak represented Ireland at U18 and U19 level. He was selected for the Ireland national under-20 rugby union team for the 2021 Six Nations Under 20s Championship. He played in the victory against Wales, scoring three penalties, three conversions and a 50-metre try; in the defeat to England, scoring a penalty and a conversion; in the win over Italy, scoring two penalties and two conversions; and in the defeat to France, scoring two conversions and three penalties.

He was selected for the Emerging Ireland squad for the Toyota Challenge in South Africa in September 2022. He was called up to the Ireland squad for the 2024 tour of South Africa after Craig Casey was injured in the first test, but as he was behind Conor Murray and Caolin Blade on the depth chart, did not earn a cap. He was selected in the Ireland squad for the 2026 Six Nations Championship, and made his senior international debut from the bench in a 27-17 win against Wales on 6 March 2026.
