= Harry Sheridan =

Irish rugby union player

- Born: 21 September 2001 (age 25) Holywood, County Down
- Height: 1.95 m (6 ft 5 in)
- Weight: 121 kg (19.1 st; 267 lb)
- School: Sullivan Upper School
- University: Trinity College Dublin

Rugby union career
- Position(s): lock, flanker
Amateur team(s)
| Years | Team | Apps | (Points) |
| 2021-2023 | Dublin University | 25 | (25) |
Senior career
| Years | Team | Apps | (Points) |
| 2023– | Ulster | 65 | (35) |
- Correct as of 31 October 2026
International career
| Years | Team | Apps | (Points) |
| 2021 | Ireland U20 | 5 | (0) |
| 2024 | Emerging Ireland | 2 | (0) |
| 2026 | Ireland A | 1 | (0) |
- Correct as of 05 February 2026

Harry Sheridan is an Irish rugby union player who plays lock and flanker for Ulster Rugby.

Born in Holywood, County Down, he attended Sullivan Upper School, where he initially played prop, before converting to lock. He was the school's leading scorer in 2020. He missed out on a place in the Ulster academy when he left school, instead going to Trinity College Dublin to study Management Science and Information Systems. He played rugby for Dublin University in the All-Ireland League, and stayed in touch with Ulster academy coach Kieran Campbell, including sending him videos of his performances.

During the COVID-19 pandemic, he studied online from home, meaning he could train with the Ulster sub-academy. He was selected for Ulster 'A' against Leinster 'A' in January 2021, the first time he had played blindside flanker, and trained with the Ulster senior team. He played all but five minutes of the 2021 under-20 Six Nations Championship for Ireland. He joined the Ulster academy ahead of the 2021–22 season.

For the 2022–23 academic year he received a Trevor West Scholarship for exceptional contribution to sport at Trinity College. He made his senior Ulster debut off the bench in January 2023 in the Champions Cup against La Rochelle, replacing Iain Henderson, before making his first start at home against Sale Sharks. He scored his first Ulster try in a URC defeat to Glasgow Warriors in February 2023. He signed a development contract for the 2023-24 season, to be upgraded to a full senior contract the following year. He was named Ulster's young men's player of the year for the 2023-24 season in the 2024 Ulster Rugby Awards.

He has a black belt in Taekwondo.
