= Cameron Doak =

Irish rugby union player

- Born: 17 December 2003 (age 22)
- Height: 1.90 m (6 ft 3 in)
- Weight: 126 kg (19.8 st; 278 lb)
- School: Wallace High School
- Notable relative(s): Neil Doak (father); Nathan Doak (brother)

Rugby union career
- Position: Prop
Senior career
Years	Team	Apps	(Points)
2025–26	Harlequins	2	(0)

Cameron Doak (born 17 December 2003) is an Irish professional rugby union footballer who played for Prem club Harlequins. His preferred position is Prop.

== Early life ==
Doak was educated at Wallace High School, Lisburn and played at loosehead prop for their rugby union team which reached the Schools’ Cup final in 2020, although the final was cancelled due to the COVID-19 pandemic. He featured for Ireland at youth level.

== Career ==
Doak joined the Ulster Rugby Academy from the 2023–24 season. He also played for City of Armagh RFC in the All-Ireland League. He left Ulster at the conclusion of the 2024–25 season.

Doak signed for the Senior Academy of English Prem side Harlequins ahead of the 2025–26 season. He made his debut in the Premiership Rugby Cup against Newcastle Red Bulls in September 2025. He left Harlequins at the end of the 2025-26 season, having made two appearances for the club.

== Personal life ==
He is the son of former professional Neil Doak. His brother Nathan Doak is also a rugby union player.
