= Greg McGrath =

Irish rugby union player

- Born: 21 January 1997 (age 29) Republic of Ireland
- Height: 1.83 m (6 ft 0 in)
- Weight: 125 kg (276 lb; 19 st 10 lb)
- School: Bridgetown Vocational College

Rugby union career
- Position: Tighthead Prop/Loosehead Prop
Amateur team(s)
Years	Team	Apps	(Points)
2016-	Lansdowne		
Senior career
Years	Team	Apps	(Points)
2020–2021	Leinster	3	(0)
2021–2022	Connacht	7	(0)
2022–2023	Jersey Reds	25	
2023-2024	Ulster	3	(0)
- Correct as of 10 November 2023
International career
Years	Team	Apps	(Points)
2017	Ireland U20s	5	(0)
- Correct as of 18 June 2017

Greg McGrath (born 21 January 1997) is an Irish rugby union player from Wexford, currently playing for URC and European Rugby Champions Cup side Ulster. He previously played for Leinster, Connacht, and Jersey Reds. His preferred position is tighthead prop.

A former Ireland under-20 international who played club rugby for Lansdowne, McGrath made his debut as a replacement for Leinster in Round 10 of the 2020–21 Pro14 against Connacht. He signed for Connacht ahead of the 2021-22 season. He was released by Connacht at the end of the season, and joined Jersey Reds in the English Championship. After the liquidation of Jersey Reds, he joined Ulster as cover for players unavailable due to injury or World Cup duty.
