= Neil Doak =

Irish rugby union player & cricketer

- Born: Neil George Doak; 21 June 1972 (age 54) Lisburn, Northern Ireland
- Height: 1.73 m (5 ft 8 in)
- Notable relative: Nathan Doak (son)

Rugby union career
- Position: Scrum-half
Amateur team(s)
Years	Team	Apps	(Points)
- North of Ireland
–	Ballymena		
–	Malone		
–	Belfast Harlequins		
Senior career
Years	Team	Apps	(Points)
1995–2005	Ulster	76	
Coaching career
- Years: Team
- 2008–2017: Ulster (Attack Coach)
- 2013: Ireland (Backs Coach)
- 2014: Emerging Ireland (Backs Coach)
- 2018–2020: Worcester Warriors (Attack Coach)
- 2020: Georgia (Back and Attack Coach)
- 2024–2025: Ireland U20
- Correct as of 16 March 2026
- Cricket career

Cricket information
- Batting: Right-handed
- Bowling: Off-spin

Career statistics
Competition	First-class	List A
Matches	2	3
Runs scored	58	86
Batting average	19.33	43.00
100s/50s	0/0	0/1
Top score	27*	84*
Balls bowled	6	90
Wickets	0	0
Bowling average	–	–
5 wickets in innings	–	–
10 wickets in match	–	–
Best bowling	–	–
Catches/stumpings	3/–	1/–
- Source: Cricket Archive, 12 March 2019

Neil George Doak (born 21 June 1972) is a Northern Irish former cricketer and rugby union player. He is the former head coach of the Ireland U20 rugby union team.

He has served as attack and backs coach with English club side Worcester Warriors, and Georgia during the 2020 Autumn Nations Cup. Doak previously worked as attack and backs coach of Irish provincial side Ulster from 2008 to 2017, where he also spent his professional playing career. During his time with Ulster, he had brief stints as a coach with Ireland and Emerging Ireland.

== Rugby union ==
=== Playing career ===
Doak played at amateur level for four Irish clubs, all based in Ulster. These were North of Ireland FC, Ballymena RFC, Malone RFC and Belfast Harlequins. In addition to these clubs, Doak also played for the Ulster provincial side. He played 76 times for Ulster, before retiring in April 2005.

Doak came close to representing his country at international level. He was named in the Ireland squad for the 2002 Six Nations Championship, the 2003 World Cup and was named as a substitute for a match against Fiji in 1995, but never earned a senior cap for the Ireland side.

=== Coaching career ===
Following his retirement from playing, Doak began working as part of Ulster's academy system. He served as an Elite Player Development Officer and head coach of the under-19 and under-20 sides. Doak was promoted to the senior set up in 2007, taking the role of skills coach and managing the province's second-tier side, Ulster A. In 2008 he was promoted again, this time becoming the team's attack and backs coach. During his time with Ulster, Doak also took up temporary roles within the Irish setup. In 2013, he served as Ireland's backs coach during their tour to North America. In 2014, he served as backs coach to Emerging Ireland in the 2014 IRB Nations Cup.

In the summer of 2014, Ulster sacked head coach Mark Anscombe on short notice. Ireland defence coach Les Kiss took over as director of rugby on an interim basis for the start of the 2014–15 season. In October 2014, Kiss returned to his position with the Ireland team, with and Doak took over the role of head coach. It was announced that Kiss would return to his role with Ulster on a full-time basis following the 2015 World Cup, leaving Doak in charge of the province for the remainder of the season and the start of the 2015–16 campaign. He served in this role under Kiss until the end of the 2016–17 season, when he was replaced by Jono Gibbes.

In March 2018, it was announced that Doak had joined English Premiership side Worcester Warriors. He was hired as attack and backs coach, taking up the role for the 2018–19 season. He left Worcester at the end of the 2019–20 season.

Doak coached Georgia during the 2020 Autumn Nations Cup.

In December 2024, he became head coach of the Ireland U20, appointing Ian Keatley as an assistant coach. Since Doak took charge of the under-20s they have finished 6th in the 2025 U20 Six Nations and 11th in the U20 World Championship. Doak was replaced as coach of the Ireland Under-20s on the 1st of October 2025, less than one year after taking charge.

In the spring of 2026 Neil took over the Head Coaching role at Banbridge RFC

== Cricket ==
In addition to playing rugby, Doak was also an accomplished cricketer, representing Ireland internationally.

A right-handed batsman and off spin bowler, he made his debut for the Irish cricket team in June 1993, playing against Scotland in a first-class match. He went on to play for Ireland on 32 occasions, his last match coming against Zimbabwe in June 2000, though this was more than three years after his previous appearance in the third place play-off of the 1997 ICC Trophy against Scotland.

Of Doak's matches for Ireland, two were first-class matches against Scotland, and three had List A status. In all matches for Ireland, he scored 479 runs at an average of 26.61, his highest score being 84 not out against Surrey in a Benson & Hedges Cup match on 14 May 1996, an innings for which he won the man of the match award, despite finishing on the losing side. He took 31 wickets, at an average of 21.84, with his best bowling figures being four wickets for nine runs against Gibraltar in the 1996 European Championship and against Israel in the 1997 ICC Trophy.

Doak played for Ireland in three international tournaments; the 1994 ICC Trophy, the 1996 European Championship, during which he won a man of the match award for a performance against Denmark where he took 4/44 and scored 51 not out, and the 1997 ICC Trophy, during which he won a man of the match award for the above-mentioned performance against Israel.

== Family ==
Doak's son Nathan is a professional rugby union player, playing scrum half for Ulster and the Ireland national under-20 rugby union team. Another son, Cameron, plays prop, and joined the Ulster Rugby academy in 2023.

== See also ==
- List of Irish cricket and rugby union players
