= Richie Murphy =

Irish rugby union player and coach

- Born: 29 July 1974 (age 52)
- School: Presentation College, Bray
- Notable relative(s): John Murphy (uncle); Ben Murphy (son); Jack Murphy(son)

Rugby union career
- Position: Out-half
Amateur team(s)
Years	Team	Apps	(Points)
1994-1997	Greystones		
1997-2001	Clontarf		
2001-2002	Greystones		
2004-05	Wicklow		
2004-05	Carlow		
2005-2008	Old Belvedere		
Provincial / State sides
Years	Team	Apps	(Points)
1998-99	Leinster	2	(9)
Coaching career
- Years: Team
- 2010-2015: Leinster (skills & kicking)
- 2013: Emerging Ireland (assistant)
- 2013-21: Ireland (skills & kicking)
- 2021-24: Ireland U20 (head)
- 2024-: Ulster (head)

Richie Murphy (born 29 July 1974) is an Irish rugby union coach and former player. After three successful seasons as head coach of the Ireland national under-20 rugby union team, he became head coach of Ulster in 2024.

He was educated at Presentation College, Bray, and captained the school to the Leinster Schools Junior Cup in 1990. He played out-half for Greystones, Clontarf, Carlow and Old Belvedere in the All-Ireland League, represented Leinster, including two appearances in the 1998–99 Heineken Cup. and turned down opportunities to play professionally in England and Italy, preferring to stay in Ireland. He was the All-Ireland League's record points scorer until 2017, when he was overtaken by Dolphin's Barry Keeshan.

He worked for Leinster as a player development officer, and became the province's Senior Skills and Kicking Coach in 2010, helping to develop players like Johnny Sexton, Ian Madigan and Fergus McFadden. Sexton would phone him for guidance while at the 2011 Rugby World Cup with Ireland. In 2013 he was backs coach for Emerging Ireland for the Tbilisi Cup under head coach Allen Clarke. He became skills and kicking coach for the senior Ireland team in 2013, being appointed to the role full-time in 2015. He became head coach of the Ireland national under-20 rugby union team in 2021, taking over from Kieran Campbell. Under his leadership Ireland won two Grand Slams in a row in the 2022 and 2023 Under 20s Six Nations, were losing finalists in the 2023 World Rugby U20 Championship, and finished second and unbeaten in the 2024 Under-20s Six Nations. After the departure of Dan McFarland, Ulster named Murphy as interim head coach from the end of the 2024 Under-20s Six Nations to the end of the 2023–24 season. He signed a two-year contract with Ulster in May.

He is the nephew of the former Ireland international Johnny Murphy, and has two sons who are rugby players: Ben Murphy plays scrum-half for Connacht, and Jack Murphy plays out-half for Ulster.

== Managerial statistics ==
As of match played 31 October 2026

Team	Nation	From	To	Record				
Team	Nation	From	To	G	W	D	L	Win %
Ireland U20	(Ireland)	2021	2024	25	20	2	3	80
Ulster	(Ireland)	2024	Present	63	28	3	32	44.44
Total				88	48	5	35	54.55
