= John Cooney (rugby union) =

Irish rugby union player (born 1990)

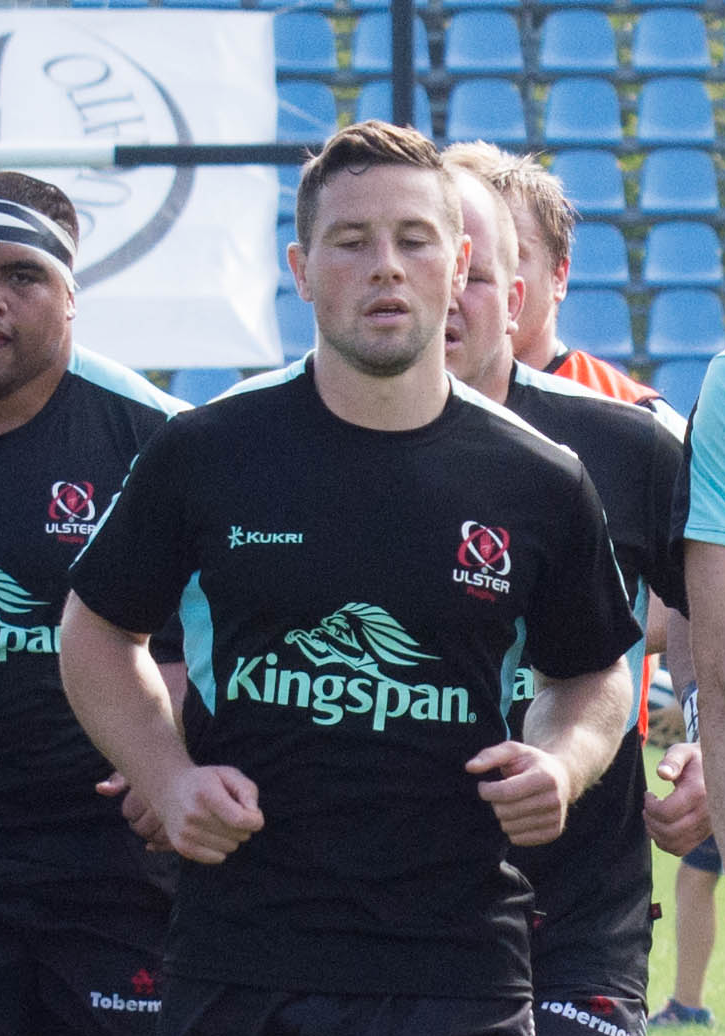
- Cooney training with Ulster, 2017
- Born: John Clark Michael Cooney; 1 May 1990 (age 36) Dublin, Ireland
- Height: 178 cm (5 ft 10 in)
- Weight: 85 kg (13.4 st; 187 lb)
- School: Gonzaga College
- University: University College Dublin

Rugby union career
- Position: Scrum-half
Amateur team(s)
Years	Team	Apps	(Points)
- Terenure College
–	Lansdowne		
–	De La Salle Palmerston		
Senior career
Years	Team	Apps	(Points)
2011–2015	Leinster	27	(15)
2014–2015	→ Connacht (loan)	14	(20)
2015–2017	Connacht	26	(81)
2017–2025	Ulster	154	(1,168)
2025–	Brive	20	(74)
- Correct as of 15 May 2026
International career
Years	Team	Apps	(Points)
2008	Ireland Schools	2	
2009–2010	Ireland U20	11	(5)
2013–	Emerging Ireland	5	(5)
2017–	Ireland	11	(7)
- Correct as of 25 April 2020

John Clark Michael Cooney (born 1 May 1990) is an Irish rugby union player who plays scrum-half for CA Brive in the French Pro D2, having previously played for Leinster and Connacht and Ulster, and has eleven caps for Ireland. He has been nominated for EPCR European Player of the Year once, been named in the Pro14 Dream Team four times, and been Ulster's player of the year twice.

He was the first player to play over 20 games for three different Irish provinces. Ulster described him as a "talismanic player ... known for his sniping runs, kicking success, and ability to dictate games" whose "performances for the province had seen him consistently rank among the top points-scorers in the PRO14, now United Rugby Championship, competition."

== Early life and family ==
Born in Dublin, Cooney grew up in the suburb of Terenure, and was educated at Gonzaga College and University College Dublin. His father, John Cooney Senior was born in Blantyre in South Lanarkshire, Scotland, and worked as a journalist for the Glasgow Herald before becoming European correspondent, and later religious affairs correspondent for The Irish Times and the Irish Independent. He also published a critical biography of the former Catholic Primate of Ireland John Charles McQuaid, Ruler of Catholic Ireland. His mother is from County Sligo. His uncle by marriage is the journalist and author Martin Sixsmith.

== Club career ==
=== Leinster ===
Cooney made his senior debut for Leinster on 2 September 2011, when he started against Ospreys in Swansea during the opening game of the 2011–12 Pro12. He continued to make appearances for Leinster in the league, playing four more times, though each of these appearances came from the bench. Most of his appearances came while Leinster's front-line players were away at the 2011 World Cup, though he also scored his first try for the team later in the season in a win over Benetton Treviso. He made his European debut for the side in the final of the 2011–12 Heineken Cup, coming on as a replacement scrum-half in Leinster's 42–14 win over Irish rivals Ulster and winning a medal in the process.

In the following season, he continued to feature for Leinster in the league making a total of 13 appearances in the 2012–13 Pro12, scoring try against Scarlets on 23 February 2013. Nine of these appearances came as a replacement. In Europe, he did not feature in the 2012–13 Heineken Cup as Leinster were knocked out in the pool stages. He did, however, come on as a replacement in three of the team's games in the 2012–13 European Challenge Cup, including the final against Stade Français, earning himself another European medal in the process.

He did not feature as regularly for Leinster in the 2013–14 season as he had the year before, finding himself behind internationals Eoin Reddan and Isaac Boss on the depth chart. He made his first appearance in the 2013–14 Pro12 against Cardiff Blues as a replacement, and went on to make a further four appearances in the league, all of these coming as starts. He scored a try against Zebre on 9 February 2014. In the 2013–14 Heineken Cup, he made one appearance for the side, being used as a replacement against Northampton Saints in the pool stages.

=== Connacht ===
It was announced in June 2014 that Cooney would be spending the 2014–15 season on loan at another Irish province, with both he and Leinster teammate Quinn Roux joining Connacht on loan. While Roux would return to Leinster in January 2015, Cooney agreed a deal to play with Connacht until the end of the season.

=== Ulster ===
After the IRFU prevented South African international Ruan Pienaar from extending his contract, Ulster signed Cooney from Connacht as his replacement ahead of the 2017–18 season. He made 25 appearances in his first season with the province, including 22 starts, and scored five tries, 37 conversions and 42 penalties, totalling 225 points. He also made 14 try assists. He was named at scrum-half in the Pro14 Dream Team for the season, having topped the league in points scored, try assists, penalties and passes, and come second in clean breaks. In the 2018 Ulster Rugby Awards, he was named Player of the Year, Rugby Writers' Player of the Year, and Supporters' Club Player of the Year.

In his second season with Ulster, he made 20 appearances, including 18 starts, and scored 142 points, including three tries, made eight try assists, and was named "man of the match" twice. He was again named in the Pro14 Dream Team. In the 2019–20 season he made 20 appearances including 18 starts, and scored 180 points including ten tries. He was named Player of the Year at the 2020 Ulster Rugby Awards, made his third straight Pro14 Dream Team. and was included in the longlist of nominations for EPCR European Player of the Year, The following season he was Supporters' Club Player of the Year, after making 19 appearances and scoring 174 points, including seven tries, and making 19 try assists and 26 clean breaks. He led the Pro14 in points scored with 115, try assists with 13, and clean breaks with 22, and made his fourth straight Pro14 Dream Team when he was included in the 2020–21 team. His season was ended in April by a neck injury sustained in the Challenge Cup semi-final against Leicester Tigers. A hamstring injury sustained against Glasgow Warriors in the opening match in September 2021, and a calf injury sustained against Munster in January 2022, reduced his involvement in the 2021–22 season, but he made his 100th appearance for the province in the URC quarter-final victory over Munster on 3 June 2022.

In December 2022 he won the inaugural URC Difference Maker award for his volunteer work with Belfast Central Mission's befriending service.

He was named Ulster's supporters club player of the year for the 2023-24 season in the 2024 Ulster Rugby Awards, and selected in the URC's team of the season for the fifth time.

He left Ulster at the end of the 2024-25 season, to join French club CA Brive.

== International career ==
Cooney represented Ireland four times at U-18s level and played eleven times for the Irish U-20s squad. Cooney also represented Emerging Ireland in the 2013 Tbilisi Cup. He came on as a replacement for Michael Heaney in the opening game, a win over Georgia, and started the two remaining games, a defeat to South Africa President's XV and a victory over Uruguay.

He made his debut for the senior Ireland team against Japan in June 2017. He made 11 appearances for Ireland, the last coming against England in the 2020 Six Nations Championship.

== Honours ==
Ireland under-20

- Six Nations Under 20s Championship (1): 2010

Leinster

- Heineken Cup (1): 2011–12
- Pro12 (2): 2012–13, 2013–14
- European Rugby Challenge Cup (1): 2012–13

Connacht

- Pro14 (1): 2015–16 Pro14

Individual

- URC Team of the Year (5): 2017–18, 2018–19, 2019–20, 2020–21, 2023–24
