= Dave Ewers =

Zimbabwean rugby union player (born 1990)

- Born: David Peter Ewers; 3 November 1990 (age 36) Harare, Zimbabwe
- Height: 1.93 m (6 ft 4 in)
- Weight: 125 kg (19 st 10 lb)
- School: Ivybridge Community College

Rugby union career
- Position: Number 8
Senior career
| Years | Team | Apps | (Points) |
| 2010-2023 | Exeter Chiefs | 236 | (195) |
| 2011-2012 | → Cornish Pirates (loan) | 14 | (0) |
| 2023-2024 | Ulster | 16 | (0) |
| 2024-2025 | Stormers | 9 | (0) |
- Correct as of 2 June 2025

David Peter Ewers (born 3 November 1990) is a Zimbabwean former rugby union player who played in the back row for Exeter Chiefs, Cornish Pirates, Ulster and the Stormers.

== Early life ==
Ewers attended Hillcrest Preparatory School in Mutare, before his family left Zimbabwe when he was 13, returning to his English grandparents in Ivybridge. His father was a teacher and working on a farm at the time.

Ewers attended the AASE programme run by Ivybridge Community College in 2009 and 2010. Ewers was a member of the Ivybridge squad 1st XV which contended the AASE final of 2009 & 2010 and won the North of England 7s Tournament the same year.

== Rugby playing career ==
=== Club level ===
Ewers was signed up by Exeter Chiefs in 2010 and made his first start in the British and Irish Cup against Newport. Before becoming a senior member of the Chiefs squad, Ewers was dual-registered and frequently played for Cornish Pirates. He was a member of the Chiefs side that reached six consecutive Premiership finals, winning in 2017 and 2020, and won the European Champions Cup in 2020. He made 226 appearances for the Chiefs, and scored 40 tries.

In 2023 he joined Ulster for a season, then moved to the Stormers for the 2024/25 season, before announcing his retirement.

=== International level ===
Ewers was selected for the England squad to face the Barbarians in the summer of 2014. In February 2016 he was called up to England's 2016 Six Nations squad.
