= NP =

NP may refer to:

== Arts and entertainment ==
- NP (novel), by Japanese author Banana Yoshimoto

== Organizations ==
- Nacionalista Party, a political party in the Philippines
- Nashua-Plainfield Community School District, Iowa, United States
- National Party (disambiguation), various political parties
- Ngee Ann Polytechnic, Singapore
- Nigeria Police Force
- Northern Pacific Railway (AAR reporting mark NP)
- November Project, free, open-to-the-public exercise group

== Places ==
- NP postcode area, Newport, Wales, UK
- Nepal (ISO 3166-1 alpha-2 country code NP)
  - .np, the country code top level domain (ccTLD) for Nepal

== Science, technology and mathematics ==
=== Biology and medicine ===
- Nucleoside phosphorylase, an enzyme
- Nurse practitioner
- Kallikrein 8, an enzyme
- Neptunium, symbol Np, a chemical element
- Nosocomial pneumonia
- Natriuretic peptide

=== Mathematics and computer science ===
- NP (complexity), Nondeterministic Polynomial, a computational complexity class
  - NP-complete, a class of decision problems
  - NP-hard, a class of problems in computational complexity
  - Co-NP, a complexity class
- Numpy a Python mathematical library
- Named Pipe a method for Inter-Process Communications (IPC)

=== Physics and chemistry ===
- NP junction or PN junction in a semiconductor device
- Neopentane, the simplest double-branched-chain alkane
- Neper (Np), a logarithmic unit for ratios
- Neptunium, a chemical element with symbol Np
- Power number (N_{p}), relating resistance force to inertia force
- Phosphorus nitride

=== Other uses in science and technology ===
- New Proposal, in the International Organization for Standardization (ISO) standardization process
- Not placed, a term used in printed circuit board design to denote the omitting of a component
- Nanoparticle
- Noun phrase, in grammar

== Other uses ==
- No problem
- Notary public, post-nominal

== See also ==
- Enpi (disambiguation)
- NPS (disambiguation)
- PN (disambiguation)
- N (disambiguation)
- P (disambiguation)
