= Portadown College =

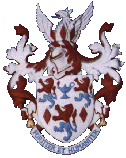
- School Crest

Location
- Killicomain Road; Portadown, County Armagh, BT63 5BU; Northern Ireland

Information
- Type: Grammar School
- Motto: Fortiter et Humaniter (With Courage and Courtesy)
- Established: 1924
- Chairman: P. H. Aiken
- Headmistress: G. Gibb
- Gender: Mixed
- Age: 14 to 18
- Enrolment: 780
- Houses: Shillington; Seale; MacCallum
- Colours: Black, Blue
- Website: http://www.portadowncollege.com/

Portadown College is an academically selective, co-educational post-14 grammar school in Portadown, County Armagh, Northern Ireland.

== History ==
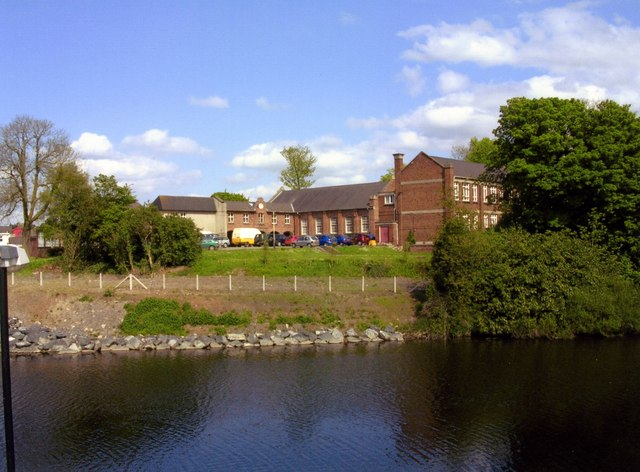

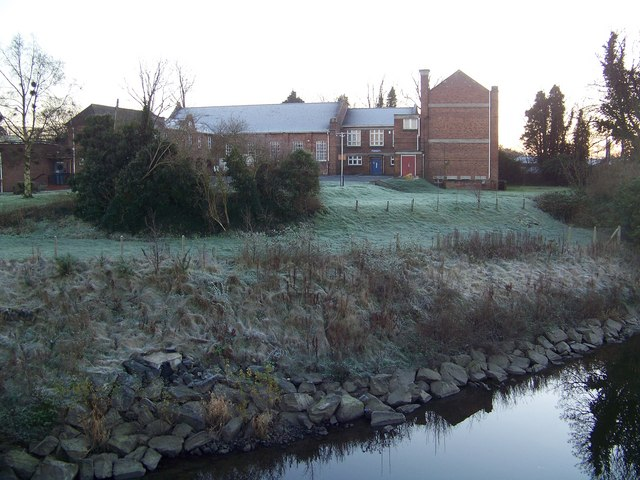
Bann House, former Portadown College building

=== Preparatory Department ===
Portadown College Preparatory Department was founded in 1921 as the Carleton Collegiate School in the former St Mark's Parochial Hall in Carleton Street, Portadown. The founding headmaster, Mr W.J. Warren, was previously the joint principal of Banbridge Academy before serving in World War I in 1914-18. The Prep was located in Bann House until 1949, when it moved to a second and larger site on the Killicomain Road. The Preparatory Department closed in 2006 and the old building now houses the Art department of the college.

=== Bann House (1924 - 1962) ===
The new school grew rapidly and required larger premises. In October 1924, a house on the Edenderry bank of the River Bann was purchased by a group of prominent local citizens (for a sum of £4,400) and made available to Mr Warren to establish Portadown College. Edenderry House was much extended during this time, a cloistered courtyard and assembly hall block was added in 1927, and finally a large new classroom and laboratory wing added in 1936. When the college moved further out, the site was first used as a Technical College and now as Bann House - the area headquarters for the musical activities of the Southern Education and Library Board. The remains of the original old house burned down in 1981.

=== Killicomain Road (1962 - Present) ===
In 1962 the college moved to a new purpose-built site on the Killicomain Road, beside the Preparatory Department.

The college has made a major contribution to the current 'two-tier' system of secondary education in the Craigavon area, known as the Dickson Plan.

=== Head teachers ===
#	Name	Tenure
1	W. J. Warren	1924-1946
2	Donald Woodman BEM	1946-1973
3	Harry Armstrong	1973-1993
4	Tom Flannagan	1993-2006
5	Deborah O'Hare	2006-2009
6	Simon Harper	2009-2019
7	Gillian Gibb	2020–present

== House system ==
The school's pupils are divided into historical houses. The three houses are Shillington (red), Seale (green), and MacCallum (yellow). The house structure provides the basis for a wide range of inter-house competitions, including sports, music and debating.

The houses are named after the following:

- MacCallum is named after RAF Gp Capt John Evelyn Matier MacCallum, a former pupil and rugby captain. He was killed in action in 1943, during World War II.
- Seale is named after brothers RAF Sqn Ldr W. T. C. Seale and Lt. Theophilus John Seale of the Royal Irish Fusiliers. The two brothers were killed in action during World War II in 1941 and 1944 respectively.
- Shillington is named after three individuals. They are Ulster Unionist politician Major David Graham Shillington, Tom Shillington and Lt. Geoffrey St. George Shillington Cather VC. The latter was killed during the Battle of the Somme in the Great War in 1916.

== Sport ==
Portadown College has been officially recognised in the field of sporting excellence and has been awarded the status of a Sportsmark School. Representative teams participate in Rugby, Boys and Girls Hockey, Netball, Football, Volleyball, Golf, Tennis, Cricket, Rowing and Athletics.

The School Rugby teams compete annually in the Ulster Schools Cup, with the best performance the reaching of the semi-finals. The Subsidiary Shield has been won three times in 1973, 1990 and 1997. In 2010 the 1st XV Rugby Team won the Ulster Schools Trophy.

Girls' hockey teams enjoy success in the Belfast Telegraph Ulster Schools Cup and McDowell Cup competitions. Portadown College hockey teams have won the trophy on four occasions in 1963, 1964, 1996 and the most recent win in 2025 against The Royal School, Armagh.

The Under 18 Boys Volleyball team are current Northern Ireland and All Ireland Champions and the under 16 Boys Volleyball team are current Northern Ireland and All Ireland Champions. The Under 18 Boys Hockey Team are the current Great British Champions after beating RBAI 2nd XI 4–3 in the final.

== School facilities ==
Subjects such as geography, home economics and ICT have miscellaneous classrooms throughout the school. There are over 20 subjects taught at the school, which are served by approximately 50 classrooms, subject study rooms and technicians. The school's science department is one of the largest and best-funded science departments in Northern Ireland. Modern language subjects on offer include, French and Spanish. The school discontinued its teaching of German as a GCSE in 2017 and Latin was removed from the school curriculum many years ago

Sports facilities include three rugby pitches, two all-weather pitches, two outdoor basketball courts, two tennis courts, a synthetic cricket pitch, two long jump sand pits and a concrete throwing circle for discus and shot put events. There is also a dedicated sports hall with gym and a second indoor sports hall. Although sport plays a key role in the school's extracurricular activities, there are a number of other societies that include: drama, debating, Duke Of Edinburgh Award expedition and charity group.

Until Late 2019, 814 (Portadown College) Squadron of NI Wing, Air Training Corps was Headquartered at the school. The 814 No. Remains in service in the town with the new 814 (Portadown) Squadron.

== Academic selection ==
The college became a selective grammar school in 1969, accepting students to the Senior School at 14 after transferring from local Junior High Schools. The school usually accepts 200 students to study GCSEs each year. After this, students who achieve at least 5 B-grades and 3 C-grades at GCSE are accepted to study A-levels. Portadown College consistently produces GCSE results above Northern Ireland averages. In 2017 93.7% of GCSE results from the school were A*-C grades, compared to a Northern Ireland average of 80.9% in the same year.

== Notable former pupils ==
- Rory Best, Ulster and Ireland rugby union player and captain
- Simon Best, Ulster and Ireland rugby union player
- Dame Mary Peters MBE, Lord Lieutenant of Belfast and Olympic Gold Medallist
- Gloria Hunniford, BBC Television Personality
- Newton Emerson, political commentator and satirist who founded the Portadown News
- Waldo Maguire, BBC broadcaster, WW2 codebreaker
- Tom McGurk, Journalist, television presenter
- Ernest Nicholson, theologian, Biblical scholar and Provost of Oriel College, Oxford
- Mark Russell, Chief Executive of The Children’s Society
- Colin Turkington, Auto Racer
- Emma Little-Pengelly, deputy First Minister of Northern Ireland
- Major General Colin Weir DSO MBE, Senior British Army Officer

Coat of arms of Portadown College

Crest
On a wreath of the colours in front of a griffin's head Argent beaked Gules between two wings Silver three lozenges also Gules.
Escutcheon
Argent in chief between two lions rampant per fess Gules and Azure an ancient lamp of the last enflamed Gules and in base a like lion between two lozenges also Gules.
Motto
Fortiter Et Humaniter

== Feeder Schools ==
- Clounagh Junior High School
- Killicomaine Junior High School
- Tandragee Junior High School
