= Portadown RFC =

Irish rugby union club, based in Portadown, Co.Armagh

(Northern Ireland) Portadown RFC
- Full name: Portadown Rugby Football Club
- Union: IRFU; Ulster
- Nickname: PRFC
- Founded: 1879; 147 years ago
- Ground(s): Chambers Park, Portadown (Capacity: 1,000)
- Chairman: Ian Wray
- President: Andrew Matchett
- Coach(es): Mark Neilly, Barry Gribben, Andrew Chambers
Team kit

Portadown RFC is an Irish rugby union team based in Portadown, County Armagh. They play in the Kukri Ulster Championship 1, the top level of Junior rugby in Ulster. The club colours are blue and white.

== History ==
=== Origins ===
In February 1879, the Irish Rugby Football Union was formed, and listed Portadown as an affiliated club, with Thomas John (TJ) Collen as the honorary secretary. Collen played for the first County Armagh side against Ulster on 27 November 1880. The first recorded captain was Arthur Farrell, who was the son of the proprietor of the Portadown News.

The first recorded Portadown match took place at Ormeau on 11 December 1879 against Ulster F.C.; the result favoured the home side with three tries to nil. The team lined out as follows:

Back – Patrick, Half back – Wheeler and Whiteside Quarter back – Waddell and Harrison Forwards – Donaldson, Davidson, Lindsay, Harpur, Collen, Shillington, O’Hanlon, Bright, Stanley and Farrel (Captain)

The next game was played on 22 January 1880 against Armagh F.C. and resulted in a win for Portadown by 1 goal and three tries to nil.

=== Post-war ===
The late 1940s to early 1950s was a period of slow rehabilitation after the Second World War. Although Jimmy Chambers played occasionally until 1948, the dominant personality in the club was Thomas Charles Wells, who joined in 1948 and remained until his death in 1976.

On Wednesday, 4 September 1963, several hundred spectators turned up to see the local side take on Ulster in the first match on Chambers Park, the town's new playing fields on the Lurgan Road. 1979 saw the club celebrate its centenary year, and saw the election of international player, Charlie Murtagh as club captain.

As of the 2010/11 Season the first team played in Kukri Qualifying League 1, having been relegated from AIB League Division Three after a playoff defeat to the City of Derry Rugby Club. The club colours are blue and white.

== Honours ==
- Ulster Towns Cup: 2
  - 1956-57, 1958-59
