= Drumcree =

Drumcree may refer to:

Events

- the Drumcree conflict

Places in Northern Ireland

- Drumcree, a parish in County Armagh
- Drumcree, a townland in Drumcree parish
- Drumcree Church, a church in Drumcree parish
- Drumcree College, a school in Drumcree parish

Places in the Republic of Ireland

- Drumcree, County Westmeath
