= Portadown News (satirical news website) =

Northern Ireland satire website

The Portadown News
- Website type: Online satirical newspaper
- Creator: Newton Emerson
- Website: PortadownNews.com
- Commercial: No
- Launched: 2001
- Current status: No longer updated

The Portadown News was a satirical web-based newspaper dealing with Northern Irish politics and culture. It was written (initially anonymously) by journalist and political commentator Newton Emerson, who had been raised in Portadown in County Armagh. Its format and style were similar to The Onion.

The site was updated fortnightly, with the first issue appearing in March 2001. In November 2001 Freeserve dropped the site after receiving complaints. In April 2001, the following month, Emerson was forced to leave his job with a Belfast telecommunications company after Robin Livingstone, the editor of the nationalist-republican Belfast newspaper Andersonstown News, named him as the website's editor. Livingstone accused Emerson of pro-unionist bias. Emerson had written anonymously out of fear of reprisals but suffered no consequences from being outed beyond receiving occasional email threats.

The website resulted in a weekend spin-off newspaper column in the Sunday World, and a bestselling book. Emerson has also written for The Irish Times, The Irish News and the Irish edition of The Daily Mirror. In 2005, Emerson stopped writing the Portadown News in order to write a column for The Mirror, but the site remained online. As of 13 March 2017, the site is not available.
