= St John the Baptist's College, Portadown =

Location
- 4 Moy Road, Portadown; County Armagh; Northern Ireland; 54.4309°N 6.4637°W

Information
- Type: Secondary school
- Motto: Parat in via (Preparing for the journey)
- Religious affiliation: Catholic
- Established: 1 September 2017
- Local authority: Education Authority (South Eastern)
- Principal: Noella Murray
- Gender: Co-educational
- Age: 11 to 16
- Enrolment: 473 (2021-22)
- Colour
- Sports: Gaelic Football, soccer, netball
- Website: stjohnthebaptistcollege.co.uk

St John the Baptist's College is a non-selective, co-educational, secondary school located in Portadown, Northern Ireland.

== History ==
It was established in September 2017 on the site of the former Drumcree College which closed in August 2017. When it opened, it was a Key Stage 3 model but it was re-designated as an 11-16 school in 2021. This enabled it to offer instruction up to GCSE level. As of 2021, it was the school's aim to extend this further to 11-18 status and enable students to study to A Level.

== Academics ==
The college offers instruction in subjects such as Art and Design, English, French, Geography, Horticulture, History, Home Economics, Irish, Mathematics, Music, Religion, Science, Technology and Design. It also offers instruction in Polish and Portuguese. The college is one of eleven schools in the Craigavon Learning Community organised by the Southern Regional College which enables schools to share resources and expertise.

The college participates in the Shared Education Programme which is designed to promote good relations between children and young people from different traditions. Its link school is Clounagh Junior High School.

== Extra-curricular ==
Sporting activities at the school include netball, Gaelic football, and soccer.

Other extra-curricular activities and clubs include an art club, ranganna Gaelige, chess and draughts club, 'eco club', 'high achievers maths and English provision', homework club, coding club, choir, media club, credit union savings club, music lessons, traditional music group, horticulture and a book club.

== Recognition ==
- ICT Excellence Award ("highly commended")
- Digital Schoolhouse Status
- Google Reference school
