= ARFC =

ARFC may refer to:

In association football (soccer):

- Adamstown Rosebuds FC
- Albert Rovers F.C.
- Albion Rovers F.C.
- Albion Rovers F.C. (Newport)
- Ards Rangers F.C.
- Arniston Rangers F.C.
- Athersley Recreation F.C.

In rugby union:

- Aberavon RFC
- Abercarn RFC
- Abercrave RFC
- Abercynon RFC
- Aberdare RFC
- Abergavenny RFC
- Abertillery RFC
- Aberystwyth RFC
- Alnwick RFC
- Ammanford RFC
- Annan RFC
- Antrim RFC
- Ardee RFC
- Ards RFC
- Arklow RFC
- Army Rugby Football Club
- Ashbourne RFC
- Athboy RFC
- Ayr RFC
