= Enpi =

Enpi may refer to:

- Enpi (elbow strike), a Japanese martial arts term meaning "elbow strike"
- Enpi (kata), a kata found in Shotokan and other karate styles
- ENPI, European Neighbourhood and Partnership Instrument, the funding instrument of the European Union's European Neighbourhood Policy

== See also ==
- EMPI (disambiguation)
- NP (disambiguation)
