= Killicomaine Junior High School =

Coordinates: 54.417°N 6.459°W

Location
- Upper Church Lane; Portadown, Armagh; Northern Ireland

Information
- Type: Secondary School
- Established: 1958
- Founder: Dickson Plan
- Chairman: David Thompson
- Principal: Jane Murphy
- Staff: 45
- Gender: Mixed
- Age: 11 to 14
- Enrolment: 600
- Houses: Blacker; Schomberg; Jackson; Walker
- Colours: Black, Red and Gold
- Website: http://www.killicomaine.co.uk/

Killicomaine Junior High School is a controlled school in Portadown, Northern Ireland.

It accepts male and female pupils following primary education. Children attend for three years and generally transfer to either Portadown College or Craigavon Senior High School. The school plays rugby, football, and hockey along with others. It was founded in 1958.

It follows Craigavon two-tier system, commonly called the Dickson Plan. In the Dickson plan, pupils attend a Junior High for three years before transferring to a different school for further education.

Though non-denominational, the school has a Protestant ethos, with local Protestant clergy going to the school every Friday for assembly and to take religious classes.
