= PN =

PN may refer to:

== Arts and entertainment ==
- Purple Noon, a 1960 film
- Patriotic Nigras, a griefing group in the game Second Life
- Portadown News, newspaper in Northern Ireland
- Portadown News (satirical website), website based in Northern Ireland

== Business and economics ==
- Pacific National, a rail freight company in Australia
- Participatory notes, issued to unregistered overseas investors in Indian stock markets
- Pennsylvania Northeastern Railroad (reporting mark PN)
- Promissory note, a contract where one party makes an unconditional promise in writing to pay a sum of money to another
- West Air (China) (IATA airline code PN)

== Organizations ==
=== Navies ===
- Pakistan Navy
- Peruvian Navy
- Philippine Navy
- Portuguese Navy

=== Political parties ===
- National Renaissance Front, Partidul Naţiunii, a political party in Romania
- Partit Nazzjonalista, a political party in Malta
- Perikatan Nasional, a political coalition in Malaysia
- Partido Nacional (Uruguay), a political party in Uruguay

== Places ==
- Penang
- Pitcairn Islands (ISO 3166-1 country code)
- Palmerston North, a city in New Zealand
- Province of Pordenone, a province in the autonomous region of Friuli-Venezia Giulia in Italy

== Science, technology, and mathematics ==
=== Aircraft ===
- Naval Aircraft Factory PN, a series of United States Navy flying boats of the 1920s and 1930s

=== Biology ===
- Parenteral nutrition
- Phylogenetic nomenclature, an approach to naming groups of living things
- Pyridoxine, the alcohol form of vitamin B_{6}

=== Electronics and computing ===
- .pn, the country code top level domain (ccTLD) for Pitcairn Islands
- p–n junction, a type of junction in electronics
- Adobe Presenter, an Adobe software

=== Mathematics ===
- Path graph of size $n$, denoted by $P_n$
- Petri net, one of several mathematical modeling languages for the description of distributed systems
- Polish notation, a prefix notation proposed by Jan Łukasiewicz
- Polynomial vector spaces, denoted by $\mathbb{P}_n$
- Pseudorandom number sequence

=== Other uses in science and technology ===
- Part number, an identifier of a particular part design used in a particular industry
- Particle number, in air-quality measurement
- petanewton, a quadrillion newtons
- Planetary nebula, in astronomy
- Post-Newtonian expansion, an approximation of General Relativity
- Proportional navigation, a concept in missile guidance systems
- Pseudorandom noise, a deterministic sequence of pulses used in spread spectrum communication and rangefinding
- Phosphorus mononitride (PN), an inorganic compound found in space
- Telephone number (or just phone number), a sequence of numbers assigned to a telephone subscription

== Other uses ==
- Polynesian languages
- Pottery Neolithic
- Primera Nacional, second division association football league in Argentina
- Proper noun, a linguistic term for the name of an entity
- Public News, an alternative newspaper in Houston (1982-1998)
