= Drumcree College =

Coordinates: 54.433°N 6.464°W

- Portadown, County Armagh; Northern Ireland

Information
- Type: Maintained
- Established: 1985

Drumcree College was a Roman Catholic secondary school located in Portadown, County Armagh, Northern Ireland. It officially opened after the amalgamation of St Brigid's Girls' High School and St Malachy's Boys' High School in 1985 becoming Drumcree High School. In 1997, the school was officially renamed Drumcree College due to the provision of Post 16 courses which were available at the time. However, pupil numbers continued to decline and it was decided in 2016 to close and to become a junior high (11–13 years) school. Drumcree College closed in August 2017 and the renamed St John the Baptist's College opened the following month.
