= Portadown Town Hall =

Municipal building in Portadown, Northern Ireland

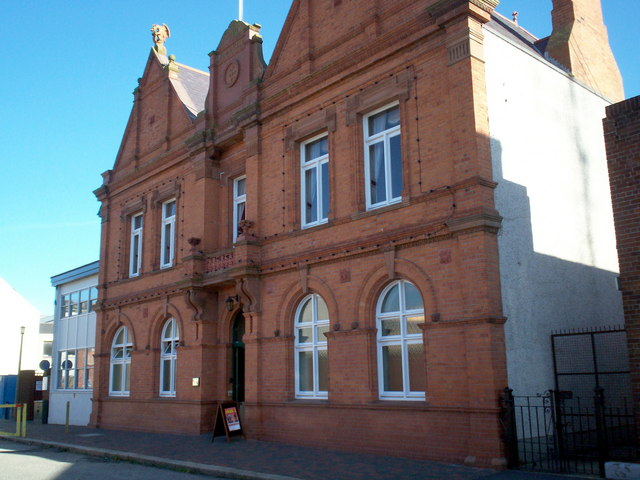
- Portadown Town Hall

- Shown in Northern Ireland
- 54.4221°N 6.4418°W
- Location: Edward Street, Portadown

History
- Built: 1890

Site notes
- Architect(s): Robert and Thomas Roe
- Architectural style: Victorian style

Listed Building – Grade B1
- Official name: Town Hall, Edward Street, Portadown, County Armagh
- Designated: 14 August 1981
- Reference no.: HB 14/14/014

Portadown Town Hall is a municipal structure in Edward Street, Portadown, County Armagh, Northern Ireland. The structure, which is primarily used as a theatre, is a Grade B1 listed building.

== History ==
In the late 19th century the town commissioners for Portadown decided to procure various improvements to the town including the construction of new municipal buildings. The new building was designed by Robert and Thomas Roe in the Victorian style, built in red brick with terracotta dressings and was completed in 1890. The design involved a symmetrical main frontage with three bays facing onto Edward Street; the central bay featured, on the ground floor, a doorway flanked by pilasters and brackets supporting a balcony and, on the first floor, a French door, also flanked by pilasters, with a pediment containing a date stone and the inscription "Town Hall" above. The outer bays, which were gabled, were fenestrated by pairs of segmental windows on the ground floor and by pairs of rectangular windows on the first floor. Internally, the principal room was the main assembly hall.

The area was advanced to the status of urban district in 1899 and to municipal borough with the town hall as its headquarters in July 1947. A mayoral chain was commissioned and presented to the council by the local rose breeder, Mrs Sam McGredy: the chain was made from gold medals awarded to the family for rose breeding. The town hall was also used for public events from an early stage and performers included the Irish singer, Bridie Gallagher, in May 1952.

The building continued to serve as the meeting place of the urban district council for much of the 20th century, but ceased to be the local seat of government after the enlarged Craigavon Borough Council was formed in 1973. It was subsequently converted for use as a theatre and became a regular venue for the local production company, the Gateway Theatre Group.
