= Charlie Murtagh =

Rugby union player from Northern Ireland

- Full name: Charles William Murtagh
- Born: 30 August 1949 (age 77) Lurgan, Co. Armagh, Northern Ireland
- Height: 6 ft 4 in (193 cm)

Rugby union career
- Position: Lock
International career
Years	Team	Apps	(Points)
1977	Ireland	1	(0)

Charles William Murtagh (born 30 August 1949) is a former Ireland rugby union international from Northern Ireland.

Born in Lurgan, Murtagh was a lock who played for Dungannon, Portadown and Ulster. He gained his only Ireland cap in a match against Scotland at Murrayfield during the 1977 Five Nations Championship.

Murtagh coached Portadown in the late 1980s.

== See also ==
- List of Ireland national rugby union players
