= Waldo Maguire =

British broadcaster

Waldo Maguire (31 May 1920 – 23 November 2005) was a British broadcaster for the BBC. He had a long career with the BBC, culminating in his appointment in 1966 as the Controller of BBC Northern Ireland. He served in this position until 1972. Returning in 1975 to New Zealand where he had worked before joining the BBC in Northern Ireland, where he worked for South Pacific Television.

Born in Portadown, Co. Armagh, Ulster as Benjamin Waldo Maguire, he attended Portadown College and Trinity College, Dublin, where he studied philosophy and mathematics. After graduating with a BA in 1942 from Trinity, he joined the British Army and he was recruited to work at Bletchley Park as a codebreaker. There he met the woman who would become his wife, Lilian Martin. They were married until her death in 1998 and had four sons.

He was awarded the OBE in 1973 and retired from the BBC the following year. He suffered two strokes, the first in 1972 while on a fishing trip in Co. Donegal, and the second in 1999.

== Quote ==
- I’m a Christian ... and therefore I find it very difficult to go to church in Northern Ireland.
