= Clounagh Junior High School =

Coordinates: 54.417°N 6.459°W

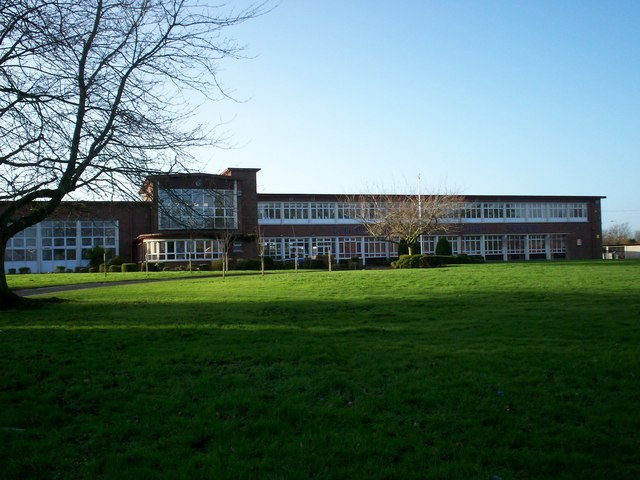
- Clounagh Junior High School, 2008

Location
- Brownstown Road; Portadown, BT62 3QA; Northern Ireland

Information
- Established: 1957
- Chairman: David Blevins
- Principal: Phillip Elliott
- Staff: 70 approx
- Gender: Mixed
- Age: 11 to 14
- Enrollment: 660
- Houses: Carson; Scot; Nuffield; Alexander
- Colours: Blue and Gold
- Website: Clounagh JHS

Clounagh Junior High School is a controlled school on the Brownstown Road, Portadown, Northern Ireland. It accepts male and female pupils following primary education. Generally, children attend for three years (from ages 11–14) however, those with special educational needs stay for an extra two years. After the children leave, they are ordinarily transferred to either Portadown College or Craigavon Senior High School.

It follows Craigavon two-tier system, commonly called the Dickson Plan. As of 2023, the school principal is Phillip Elliott following the retirement of former principal Raymond Hill.
