= NPS =

NPS may refer to:

== Organizations ==
- National Park Service, Taiwan
- National Park Service, U.S.
- National Pension System, India
- National Pension Service, Korea
- National Phobics Society, UK charity
- National Piers Society, UK charity
- National Poetry Slam, competition
- National Police Service, UK
- National Probation Service, a statutory criminal justice service for England and Wales
- National Prosecution Service, Philippines
- Nederlandse Programma Stichting, a Dutch broadcasting foundation now part of Omroep NTR
- Nigerian Prisons Services
- NPS MedicineWise, known prior to 2009 as the National Prescribing Service, a medical information provider in Australia
- Nunavik Police Service in Quebec, Canada

== Science, medicine and pharmaceutics ==
- Nail–patella syndrome, an autosomal dominant genetic disorder
- Neuropeptide S, a neuropeptide found in human and mammalian brain
- Novel psychoactive substance or new psychoactive substance (often used interchangeably)
- Nonpoint source pollution
- NPS Pharmaceuticals, acquired by Shire in 2015

== Technology ==
- Network Policy Server, component of Microsoft Server 2008

== Pipes and pipe threads ==
- National pipe straight, a non-taper pipe thread among the national pipe thread standards
- Nominal Pipe Size, a North American set of standard sizes for pipes

== Politics ==
- National Party of Scotland, 1928–1934
- National Party of Suriname
- New Socialist Party (San Marino) (Italian: Nuovo Partito Socialista)
- People's Movement of Serbia (Serbian: Narodni pokret Srbije), a political party in Serbia

== Education ==
- National Public School, Indiranagar, Bangalore, India
- Naval Postgraduate School, California, US

== Literature ==
- New Penguin Shakespeare, a series of the works of Shakespeare published by Penguin Books

== Business ==
- Net promoter score, in customer relations

== Sports ==
- Neutral Paralympic Athletes at the 2024 Summer Paralympics
