= Phosphorus nitride =

Phosphorus nitride refers to several chemical compounds of phosphorus and nitrogen:

- Phosphorus mononitride
- Tetraphosphorus hexanitride
- Triphosphorus pentanitride
