= EMPI =

EMPI may refer to:

- Enterprise master patient index, a large-scale medical records database system
- EMPI, American manufacturers of various aftermarket parts for air-cooled Volkswagens and the EMPI Imp.

== See also ==
- ENPI
