= Antrim RFC =

Rugby union football club in Northern Ireland

Antrim RFC (Antrim Rugby Football Club) is a rugby club based at Allen Park in Antrim, County Antrim, Northern Ireland. It is affiliated to the Ulster Branch of the Irish Rugby Football Union. The club presently field a First XV in the Ulster Minor League East 1 Section, finishing runner up in the 2013/14 season. The squad train at Allen Park. The club also include a Viking Minis section for children between the ages of 5 and 11, maintaining close links with local primary schools and in particular, Antrim Grammar School.

Traditionally, the team wear blue and white with navy shorts and navy socks.

== History ==
Back in the 1960s the town of Antrim suffered a population explosion from the extent of being situated on the main route between Belfast and the North West. A government paper known as the Butler report suggested that the new town should be able to support a rugby club. On the strength of this report, several local enthusiasts including Councillors Jack Allen and Jarvis Campbell got together and Antrim RFC was formed in the Summer of 1966. Jarvis Campbell became the first president and Jack Allen became the founder chairman. To this day, 2 of the founder members (Neville Laverty and Dennis Manson) remain active with the club. Initially a 1st and 2nd XV were formed and played a season of friendlies and cup matches. The teams were formed from local players who left neighbouring clubs plus a large influx of schoolboys mainly from the Ballymena. After one season, the 1st XV and the 2nd XV entered the Ulster Junior and Intermediate leagues respectively. In 1970 a 3rd XV was formed and the club soon had a 4th XV come 1976. Conveniently in 1974, Antrim Grammar School was formed and the club were able to enjoy an influx of ex schoolboys and teachers ever since. After the 1st XV winning the league in 1980, the club were able to attract more players and field a 5th XV. Progress continued as the 3rds and 4ths gained successive promotions through the leagues and the 1sts won a further promotion in 1987.

However successful the team were on the pitch, off it also came success. Until the early 1970s, the pitch was still a field beside the Antrim Borough Council offices on the Steeple Road with changing rooms being a converted cow shed. In 1971 the club acquired ground on the Randalstown Road and amalgamated with Antrim Hockey Club. To raise money to develop the pitches, a clubhouse was opened in the Antrim Castle Grounds which was the base of the Hockey section in 1972 and opened by none other than Willie John McBride. In 1979 the official move was made to the club's present home Allen Park, which was named after local Mayor, and the then Club President Jack Allen. The facilities included a floodlit training area, four grass rugby pitches, two grass hockey pitches and one all weather training pitch. Come 1986, the club extended the changing rooms and added a new club house which was opened by Sir Ewart Bell (President of the IRFU).

== 1st XV Honours ==
Gordon West cup 2001, 2002 (First side to ever defend it and joint top most wins)Gordon West Cup History

Junior League section 5 winners 1980

Ulster Towns Cup runners up 1989

== Reformation ==
In 1995 the Hockey Club severed their ties with the rugby team and moved to Muckamore Cricket Club.

After becoming recognised as one of the most ambitious teams in the Qualifying league, Antrim RFC went on to win the Gordon West Memorial in 2001 at Ravenhill. A year later, the squad defended their title and brought the trophy back to Allen Park, remaining to this very day, the only team to defend it successfully. However, due to a lack of recruitment to a 2ndXV and a significant number of player retirements in 2006, the team could not complete its fixtures post Christmas 2007 and did not field a rugby team for rest of the 2007 season. The players dispersed to play their rugby elsewhere. In the new season a group of older players and former schoolboys decided to start a team again in order to keep the team going on a social basis. In 2007 Antrim re-entered the Magners Minor Leagues and after finding their footing, went on to finish 3rd in 2009. The league was once again restructured and with the team holding their own and with player numbers increasing on a continuous basis, the playing squad formed their own sub committee and appointed a proper coach, found a new sponsor for the match kits and approached the Ulster Branch with a proposal to rejoin the Kukri Qualifying Section. The application was accepted and the club turned over a new leaf and fielded their first team within the league in 4 years against Letterkenny RFC. With only one team, the club had struggled in the league and opted to field a team in the Minors once again to allow the youngsters to learn their trade.

In 2013 the club, worked closely with Ulster Rugby and the IRFU to develop a coaching initiative which resulted in the club re-establishing the minis section once again. Working closely within the local primary schools and youth clubs, the club developed the Antrim Viking Minis brand. This was to tie in with the local history of the area and give the children something to belong to. The Viking Minis were able to field their first competitive team in almost 10 years and make their debut in the half time of the Heineken Cup game of Ulster vs Saracens in the reopening of the newly refurbished Ravenhill stadium.

== Representative Players Past and Present ==
Ricky Lutton (Ulster, Emerging Ireland)

Alan Cluff (Junior Ulster Captain, English Universities)

Stephen Dinsmore (Junior Ulster)

David Arther (Junior Ulster)

George Arther (Junior Ulster, Ulster U-19s, Ulster U-21s)

Colin Jones (Junior Ulster)

Hugh Octavius Wallace (Ulster U-20s, Irish Colleges)

Rick McKee (Irish Colleges)

Michael Laverty (Ulster U-19s)

Adrian Cochrane-Watson (Ulster U-20s)

Gareth Falls (Ulster Schools)

Gary Wilson (Ulster Schools)

Richard Manson (Ulster Schools,)

Jason Bonnes (Ulster U-18s)

Neil Manson (Ulster Youths U-16s, Ulster Youths U-18s, Rugby league Ireland )
