= Newton Emerson =

Northern Ireland political commentator

Newton Emerson (born 1969) is a political commentator from Portadown in Northern Ireland, who now lives in Belfast. He described himself as a 'liberal unionist' in 2001. He contributes to both the Sunday Times, and The Irish News as well as The Irish Times.

He first came to prominence as writer of the Portadown News website, similar to American publication, The Onion, poking fun at both sides of the political divide.

Emerson was forced to leave his job at a computer company, but maintained the website until 2005. In 2008, he presented the documentary, Lost City of Craigavon, which was broadcast on the BBC.
