= Portadown =

Town in County Armagh, Northern Ireland

Coordinates: 54.421027°N 6.458244°W

Portadown: Irish: Port an Dúnáin; Scots: Portadoun or Portadoon
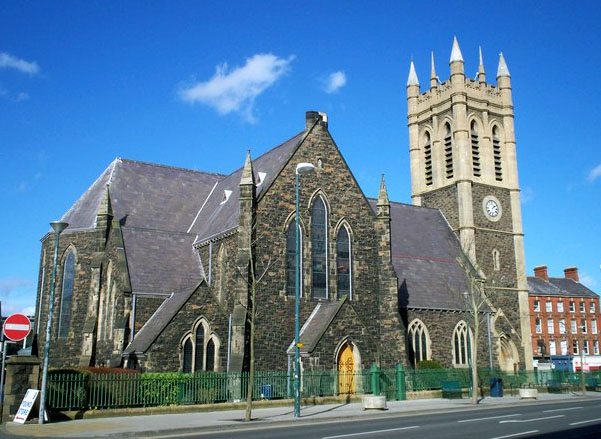
- St Mark's Church of Ireland in the centre of Portadown

- Location within Northern Ireland
- Population: 22,000 (2021 estimate)
- Irish grid reference: J008537
  - Belfast: 24 mi (39 km)
  - Dublin: 74 mi (119 km)
- District: Armagh City, Banbridge and Craigavon
- County: County Armagh
- Country: Northern Ireland
- Sovereign state: United Kingdom
- Post town: CRAIGAVON
- Postcode district: BT62, BT63
- Dialling code: 028
- Police: Northern Ireland
- Fire: Northern Ireland
- Ambulance: Northern Ireland
- UK Parliament: Upper Bann
- NI Assembly: Upper Bann

Portadown (From Irish: Port an Dúnáin, 'landing place of the little fort' pronounced [pɔɾˠt̪ˠ ə ˈd̪ˠuːnˠaːnʲ]) is a town in County Armagh, Northern Ireland. The town stands on the River Bann in the north of the county, about 24 miles (39 km) southwest of Belfast. It is in the Armagh City, Banbridge and Craigavon Borough Council area and had a population of about 22,000 at the 2021 Census. For some purposes, Portadown is treated as part of the "Craigavon Urban Area", alongside Craigavon and Lurgan.

Although Portadown was founded during the early 17th century British Plantation of Ulster, it was not until the Victorian era and the arrival of the railway that it developed as a major town. It earned the nickname "hub of the North" because it was a major railway junction; here the Great Northern Railway's line diverged for Belfast, Dublin, Armagh and Derry. In the 19th and 20th centuries, Portadown was also a major centre for the production of textiles (mainly linen).

Portadown is the site of the long-running Drumcree dispute. Catholics have opposed yearly marches by the Protestant Orange Order through a majority-Catholic part of town. This often sparked protests and violence. In the 1990s, the dispute escalated and prompted a massive police and army operation, drawing worldwide attention to Portadown.

== History ==
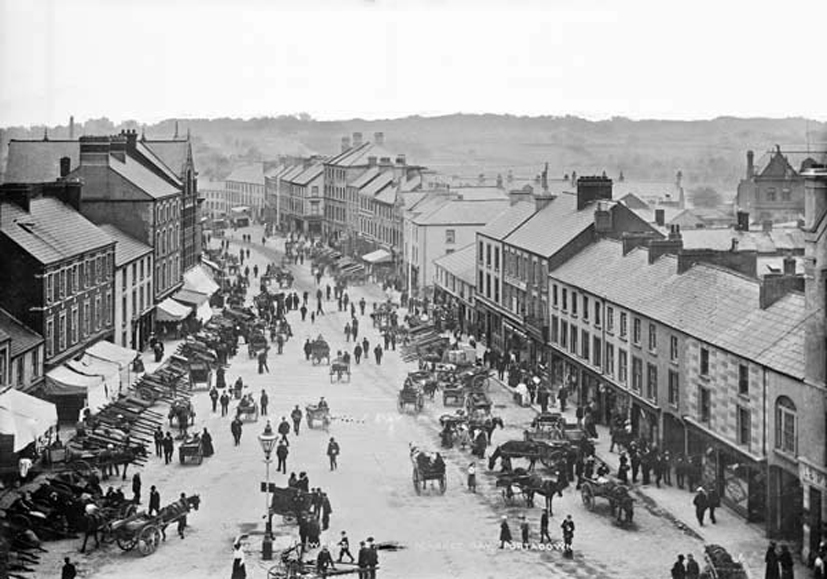
Portadown High Street on market day (c. 1900)

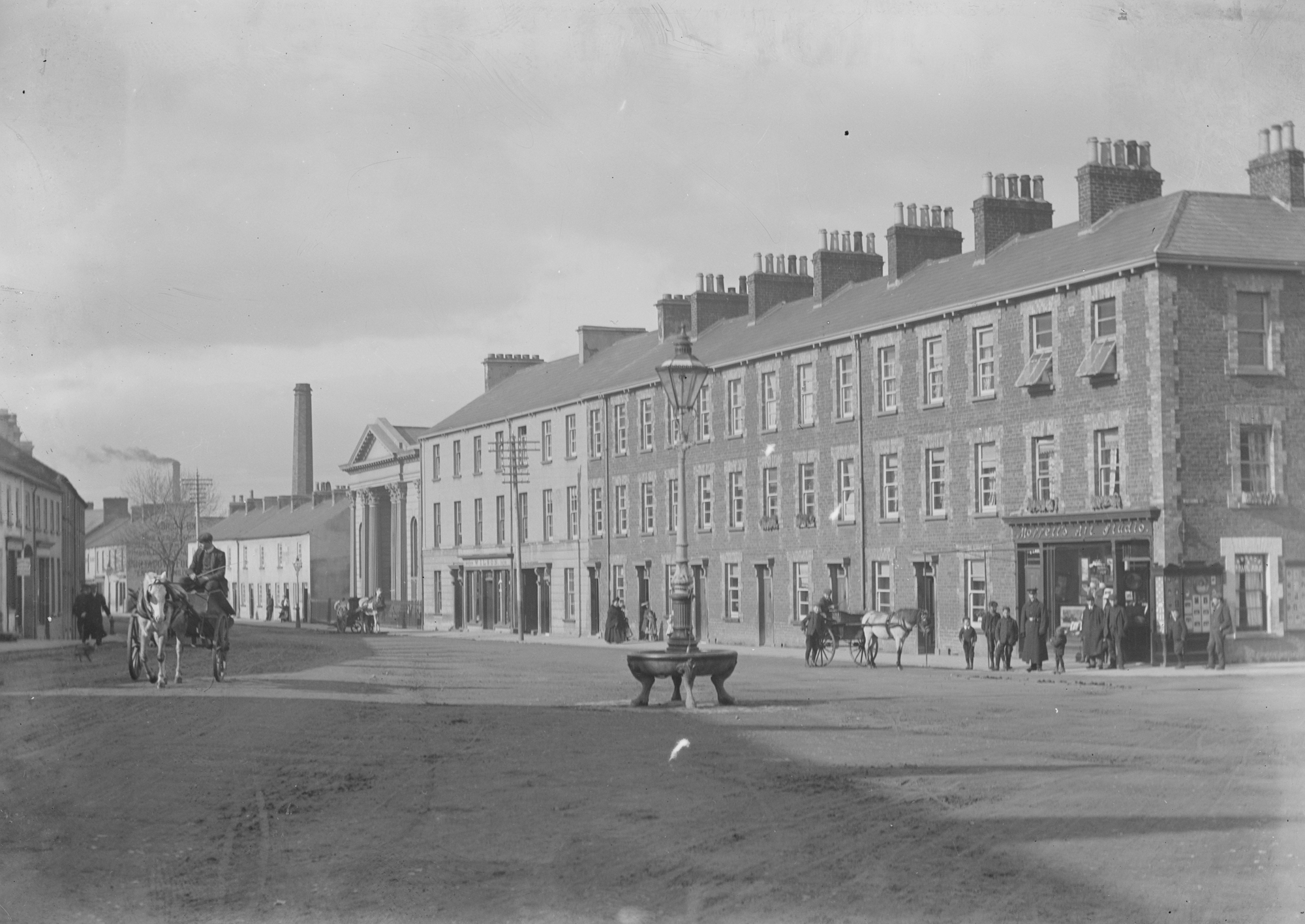
The Edenderry area of Portadown in the early 1900s

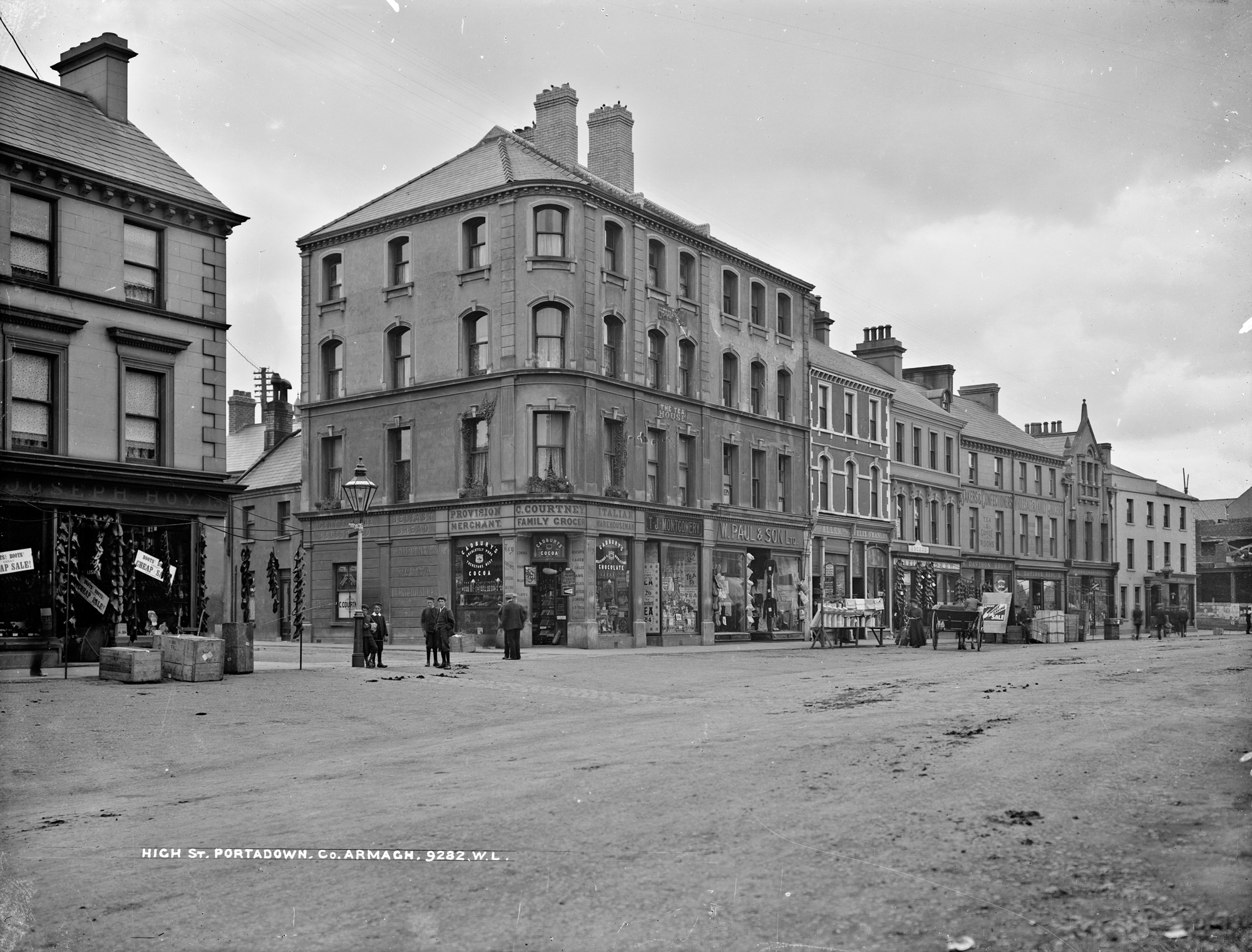
High Street in the early 1900s

=== Early history and Plantation of Ulster ===
The Portadown area had long been populated by Irish Gaels.

At the beginning of the 1600s, this area was within the district of Clancann (Clann Chana), which was part of the larger territory of Oneilland (Uí Nialláin). This district was named after the dominant local clan—the McCanns (Mac Cana)—who had occupied the area since before the 13th century. The McCanns were then a vassal sept of the O'Neills (Uí Néill). On the eastern banks of the River Bann was the district of Clanbrasil (Clann Bhreasail).

The town's name comes from the Irish Port a' Dúnáin (or, more formally, Port an Dúnáin), meaning the port or landing place of the small fort. This was likely a fort of the McCanns.

From 1594 until 1603, the O'Neills and an alliance of other clans fought in the Nine Years' War against the English Tudor conquest of Ireland. This ended in defeat for the Irish clans, and the Crown seized and redistributed much of their land.

In 1608, King James VI and I began the Plantation of Ulster – the organised colonisation of the region by Protestant settlers from Britain, known as 'planters'.

In 1610, as part of the Plantation, the lands of Portadown were granted to William Powell. In 1611, he sold his grant of land to Reverend Richard Rolleston, who in turn sold it in two portions to Richard Cope and Michael Obins. Obins built a large Elizabethan-style mansion for himself and his family, and a number of houses nearby for English tenants. This mansion was in the area of the present-day Woodside estate.

The present-day People's Park was part of its grounds. The park is now bounded on either side by Obins Street and Castle Street, both of which are references to "Obins' Castle". In 1631, Obins was granted a licence for a "fair and market". He built the first bridge across the River Bann shortly thereafter.

=== Irish rebellion of 1641 ===
During the Irish Rebellion of 1641, Obins Castle was captured by a force of dispossessed Irish led by the McCanns, Magennises and O'Neills. In November 1641, Irish rebels—likely under the command of Toole McCann—killed about 100 captured British settlers by forcing them off the Bann bridge and shooting those who swam ashore.

This was one of the worst atrocities of the rebellion. It fuelled revenge killings by the English during the conflict that followed and was used to justify the Cromwellian conquest of Ireland. The Irish Confederate troops abandoned Obins Castle during the Cromwellian conquest. Hamlet Obins (who had survived its capture) repossessed it in 1652. It was later passed to his son, Anthony Obins.

=== Industrialisation ===
In 1741, Anthony Obins was involved with development of the Newry Canal. He was succeeded by Michael Obins in 1750. The latter set up a linen market in Portadown in 1762, which laid the foundations of Portadown's major industry.

Michael Obins died in 1798 and left a son, Michael Eyre Obins, to succeed him. In 1814, Eyre Obins took holy orders; he sold the estate to the Sparrow family of Tandragee.

George Montagu, 6th Duke of Manchester (known as Viscount Mandeville) married Millicent Sparrow in 1822 and came into possession of the estate. This family's legacy in the town includes such street names as Montagu Street, Millicent Crescent and Mandeville Street, and buildings such as the Fergus Hall (formerly the Duke's School and Church Street PS), and the Carleton Home. (Formerly the Duke's townhouse, this was later used as a maternity hospital/nurses accommodation. It has since been adapted as private apartments).

The Blacker family, descended from Danes who had invaded and settled in Ireland in the 9th century, founded an estate at Carrick, on the Portadown–Gilford road. The land had been bought by Colonel Valentine Blacker from Sir Anthony Cope of Loughgall. It became known as Carrickblacker, and is now the site of Portadown Golf Club. One of the notables in the Blacker family, Colonel William Blacker, High Sheriff of Armagh, took part in the "Battle of the Diamond" and was a founding member of the Orange Order. In August 1796, Portadown District LOL No. 1 was formed, becoming the first Orange District.

This, and subsequent events such as the founding of a 'provisional' Grand Lodge in the town after the 'voluntary' dissolution of the Order in 1825, led to the town being known as 'The Orange Citadel'. It was a center of sectarian strife for two centuries. Many of the Blacker family were soldiers or churchmen. The family estate was purchased in 1937 by Portadown Golf Club. In 1988 the club demolished Carrickblacker House to make way for a new clubhouse.

=== World War II ===
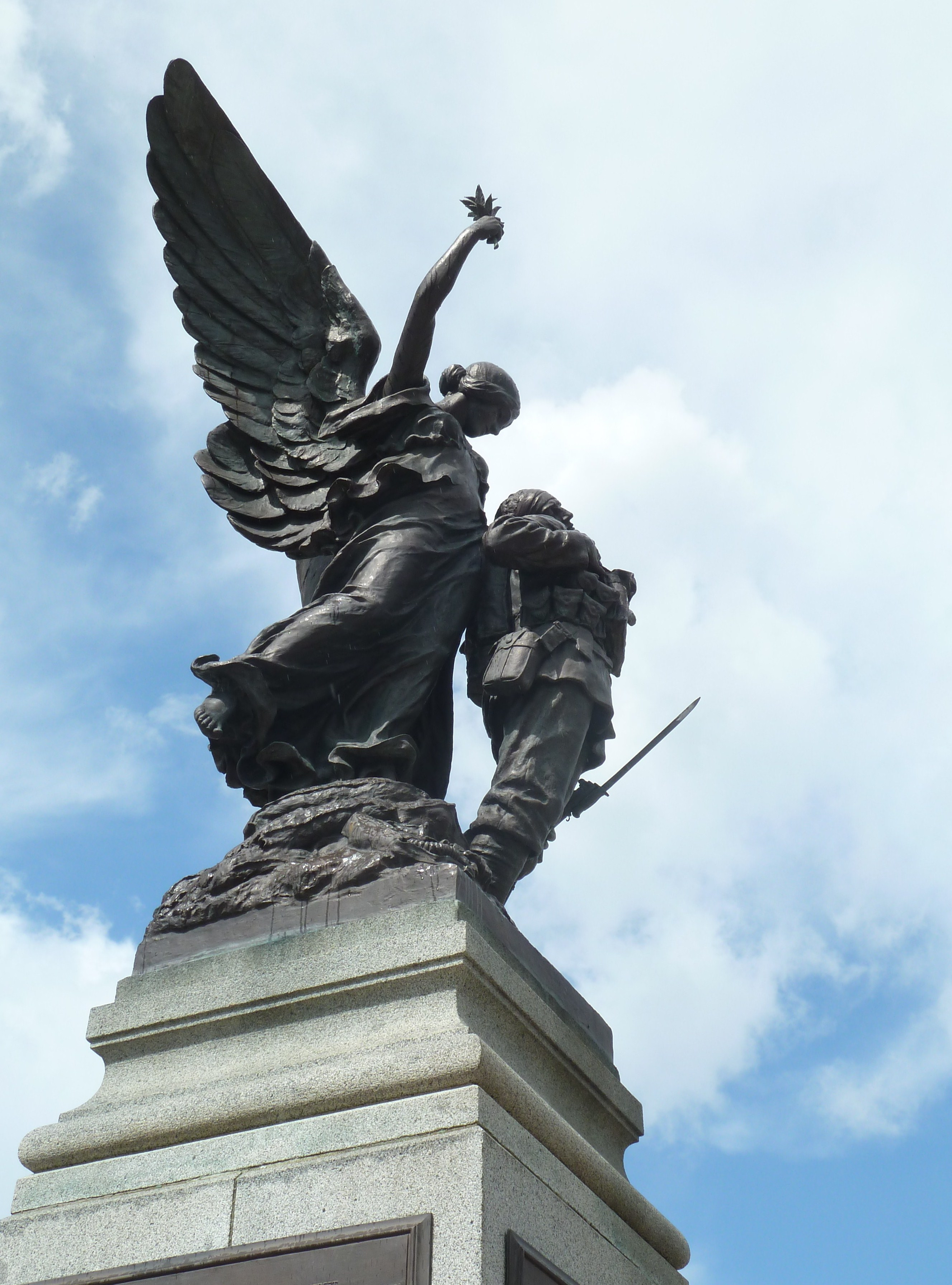
Portadown War Memorial

A large prisoner-of-war (POW) camp was built at Portadown during World War II. It was at the site of a former sports facility on what was then the western edge of town. This area is now covered by housing from Fitzroy Street and the Brownstown Estates. The camp housed (mostly) German POWs. For a time these POWs were guarded by Welsh servicemen (known as "Bluecaps") who had been transferred from assignments with troops in Germany. They were billeted at St Patrick's Hall in Thomas Street.

The local newspaper carried a story of another POW camp, adjacent to Killicomaine Castle (also known as Irwin's Castle), in what was then known as "Cullen's Lane" but is now called "Princess Way". That area was later part of the Killicomaine estate, housing built in 1954 and largely contemporary with other estates built by the then Portadown Borough Council and the former Northern Ireland Housing Trust (now called the Northern Ireland Housing Executive).

A third camp was built on the Carrickblacker estate towards the end of World War II, possibly as an overflow for the nearby Elmfield Camp in Gilford. It was used as accommodation for Allied troops and no Axis POWs were ever imprisoned there.

In 2005, a public air-raid shelter was uncovered during excavation works near the riverbank just outside the town centre. One of ten built by the council during World War II, it is one of only two now remaining. The other is at the new roundabout on the Gilford Road. These are rare examples of public air raid shelters in Northern Ireland.

=== The Troubles ===
During the Troubles, there were numerous shootings, bombings and riots in Portadown. The conflict led to the deaths of 45 people in the town.

Loyalists killed 25 people: eighteen Catholic civilians, three Protestant civilians, two members of the security forces, a republican paramilitary and a loyalist paramilitary. Irish republicans killed 18 people: nine members of the security forces, one loyalist paramilitary, seven Protestant civilians and one Catholic civilian. The security forces killed one Protestant civilian, and another loyalist was killed by his own bomb. In 1993 and 1998, the town centre was devastated by two large car bombs planted by republicans.

The Troubles resulted in the town becoming residentially segregated: the northwestern part of the town became almost wholly populated by the Catholic/Irish nationalist minority, while the rest of the town became almost wholly Protestant/unionist. Portadown's 'Catholic district' is now bordered by the railway line and by a security barrier ("peace wall") along Corcrain Road.

The Troubles also intensified the long-running Drumcree marching dispute, over Orange marches through the Catholic part of town. Each July from 1995 to 2000, the dispute drew worldwide attention as it sparked protests and violence throughout Northern Ireland, prompted a massive police/British Army operation, and threatened to derail the peace process. When the Army sealed off the Catholic part of Portadown with large steel, concrete and barbed-wire barricades, the situation was reported by news media as like a "war zone" and a "siege".

Each summer, during the "marching season", there are many Protestant/loyalist marches in the town. Loyalists put up numerous flags and raise arches over some streets. These marches, and the raising of these flags and arches near the homes of Catholic families, continues to be a source of tension and sometimes a catalyst for violence.

Community leaders in Portadown have been involved with the Ulster Project since it began in 1975. The project involves teenagers from both of Northern Ireland's main communities. The goal is to foster goodwill and friendship between them. Each year, a group of teenagers are chosen to travel to the United States, where they stay with an American family for a few weeks.

== Geography ==
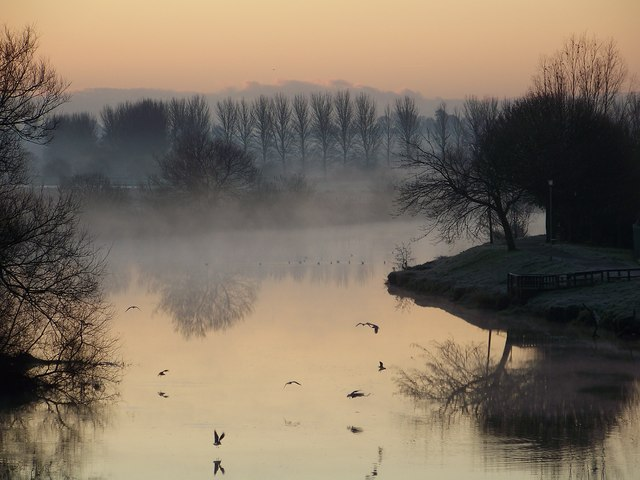
River Bann at Portadown

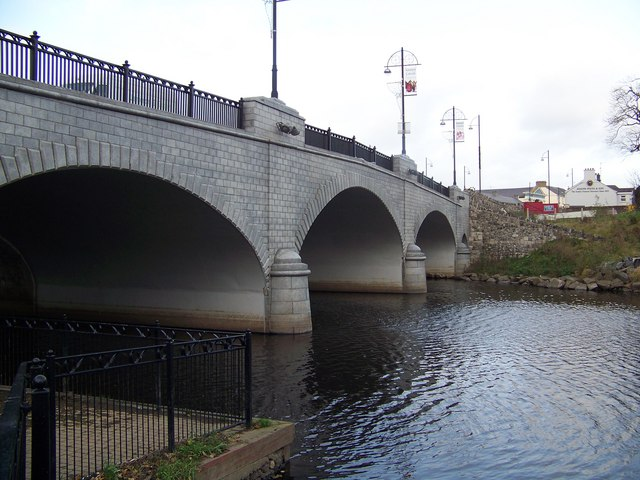
The Bann Bridge

Portadown is located in a relatively flat part of Northern Ireland, near the southern shore of Lough Neagh. Two small wetland areas are on the outskirts of the town; one at Selshion in the west and another at Annagh in the south. The Ballybay River flows into the town from the west before joining the River Bann.

=== River Bann ===
Most of the town is built on the western side of the River Bann, which supported its industry and prosperity. Construction in 1740 of the Newry Canal (linking Carlingford Lough with Lough Neagh) enabled Portadown to become a hub for the water traffic between Newry and Belfast.

There are three bridges across the river at Portadown. Bridge Street and Northway are both road bridges, and there is a railway bridge beside the Northway. The 'Bann Bridge' on Bridge Street is the oldest. It was unusual in that it was built over dry earth. After the bridge was completed, the course of the River Bann was diverted by some 100 yards to straighten a meander and run under the bridge. The old riverbed was then built upon.

In the 21st century, an archaeological dig in the area of the old riverbed uncovered the bones of some of those who were drowned in the 1641 massacre in the town.

=== Townlands ===
Just like the rest of Ireland, the Portadown area has long been divided into townlands, whose names came mostly from the Irish language. Portadown sprang up along a road (High Street/Market Street) that marked the boundary between two of these – Tavanagh and Corcrain. Over time, the surrounding townlands have been built upon and they have given their names to many roads and housing estates.

The following is a list of townlands within Portadown's urban area, alongside their likely etymologies:

West bank of the River Bann (parish of Drumcree):

- Annagh (from Irish Eanach 'marsh')
- Ballyoran (from Baile Uaráin meaning "townland of the spring")
- Baltylum (from Bailte Loma meaning "bare townlands/farmsteads")
- Clounagh or Clownagh (from Cluaineach meaning "water-meadow place" or Cluain Each, "horses' meadow")
- Corcrain (from Corr Chrainn meaning "round hill of the tree" or Corr Chreatháin, "round hill of the bushy place or aspen")
- Drumcree (from Droim Crí meaning "boundary ridge")
- Garvaghy (from Garbh Achadh meaning "rough field")
- Mahon or Maghon (from Maighean meaning "the plain")
- Selshion (from Soilseán meaning "shining place")
- Tavanagh (from Tamhnach meaning "grassland")

East bank of the River Bann (parish of Seagoe):

- Ballyhannon (from Baile Uí Sheanacháin meaning "O'Shannon's townland")
- Bocombra (formerly Bocomra, from Bac Iomarach meaning "ridged bank")
- Edenderry (from Éadan Doire meaning "hill-brow of the oak grove")
- Kernan (formerly Kerhanan, from Caorthannán meaning "place of rowans")
- Killycomain or Killicomain (from Coill Uí Chomáin meaning "Ó Comáin's woodland")
- Levaghery (from Leathmhachaire meaning "half plain")
- Lisnisky (from Lios an Uisce meaning "ringfort of the water") – the fields in Lisnisky separate Portadown from Craigavon
- Seagoe Upper (from Suidhe Gobha meaning "seat of Gobhan")

=== Climate ===
The climate of Portadown is like that of much of the rest of the UK and Ireland, being a temperate oceanic climate. It has mild temperatures throughout the year. historically summer temperatures have not reached levels to be deemed very hot and winter not very cold, but climate change has resulted in more extreme temperatures in the 21st century.

Summer temperatures can reach more than 20 °C (68 °F) though it is rare for them to go higher than 30 °C (86 °F). The consistently humid climate that prevails over Ireland can make these temperatures feel uncomfortable when they stray into the high 20s °C (80–85 °F), more so than similar temperatures in hotter but drier climates in the rest of Europe. It also receives a steady amount of rainfall throughout the year.

Climate data for Portadown
Month	Jan	Feb	Mar	Apr	May	Jun	Jul	Aug	Sep	Oct	Nov	Dec	Year
Mean daily maximum °C (°F)	7.4 (45.3)	8.1 (46.6)	10.2 (50.4)	12.6 (54.7)	15.6 (60.1)	18.0 (64.4)	19.7 (67.5)	19.3 (66.7)	16.9 (62.4)	13.4 (56.1)	10.0 (50.0)	7.7 (45.9)	13.3 (55.9)
Mean daily minimum °C (°F)	1.9 (35.4)	1.6 (34.9)	3.1 (37.6)	4.3 (39.7)	6.7 (44.1)	9.6 (49.3)	11.7 (53.1)	11.4 (52.5)	9.5 (49.1)	6.8 (44.2)	3.9 (39.0)	2.1 (35.8)	6.1 (43.0)
Average precipitation mm (inches)	74.5 (2.93)	54.0 (2.13)	65.6 (2.58)	57.6 (2.27)	57.8 (2.28)	58.4 (2.30)	62.7 (2.47)	76.3 (3.00)	68.1 (2.68)	85.5 (3.37)	74.6 (2.94)	77.1 (3.04)	812.3 (31.98)
Average precipitation days (≥ Days of rainfall >= 1 mm)	14.3	11.0	13.3	11.6	11.8	10.9	11.7	13.0	12.2	13.7	13.6	13.3	150.3
Source: Met Office

== Demography ==
For census purposes, Portadown is not treated as a separate settlement by the Northern Ireland Statistics and Research Agency (NISRA), but is combined with Craigavon, Lurgan and Aghacommon as the "Craigavon Urban Area". Within this, the town roughly corresponds to the Portadown sector, although this excludes Kernan, Seagoe, and part of Killycomain. It is within the larger Portadown District Electoral Area (DEA), which stretches to the County Tyrone border.

On the day of the last census (21 March 2021), the Portadown sector of Craigavon Urban Area had a population of 21,091. Of this population:

- 46.7% were Protestant or raised Protestant, 39.5% were Catholic or raised Catholic, 1.8% belonged to other religions, and 12% had no religion.
- 90.2% were White, and 9.8% were of other ethno-racial groups.
- 72.4% were born in Northern Ireland, and 27.6% were born in other countries.
- 80.8% spoke English as their main language, and 19% did not speak English as their main language, with the second most spoken being Portuguese (6%).

Portadown has become the most ethnically-mixed town in Craigavon Urban Area, with the foreign-born population rising ten-fold from 2011 to 2021, from 17% to 27%.

The statistics for the 2011 and 2001 censuses is combined from the electoral wards that made up Portadown urban area: Annagh, Ballybay, Ballyoran, Brownstown, Corcrain, Edenderry, Killycomain and Tavanagh.

On the day of the 2011 census the combined population of these wards was 22,899. Of this population:

- 60.9% were Protestant or raised Protestant, 31.8% were Catholic or raised Catholic, and 7.3% were of other religious backgrounds or no religious background.
- 83% were born in Northern Ireland, and 17% were born in other countries.

== Governance ==
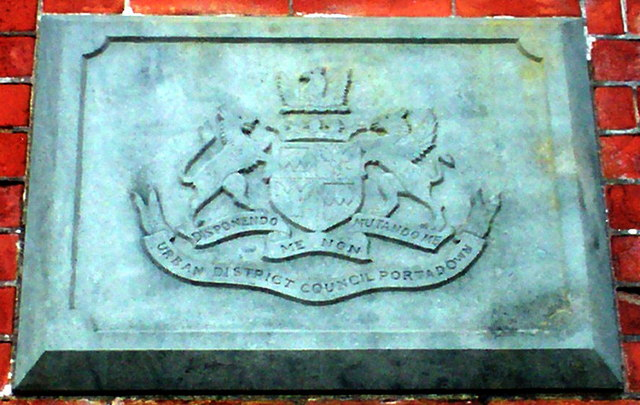
Old Town Council plaque

Portadown is part of the Upper Bann constituency for elections to the Northern Ireland Assembly and Parliament of the United Kingdom. The boundaries of the Assembly constituency and Parliament constituency are identical. This has long been a safe unionist seat.

Portadown came under the governance of Portadown Borough Council following the Local Government (Ireland) Act 1898. This was abolished with the Local Government (Boundaries) Act (Northern Ireland) 1971 and the Local Government Act (Northern Ireland) 1972. Henceforth, the town had been under the jurisdiction of the larger Craigavon Borough Council.

However, after local government reform, the town is now part of one of Northern Ireland's largest councils, the Armagh, Banbridge and Craigavon Borough Council. Councillors are elected to the council every four years by proportional representation.

The councillors for the District Electoral Area are:

Name	Party
Lavelle McIlwrath	DUP
Sydney Anderson	DUP
Julie Flaherty	UUP
Darryn Causby	Ind. Unionist
Eamon McNeill	SDLP
Paul Duffy	Sinn Féin

== Religious sites ==
Portadown is located along the River Bann, which forms the boundary between two parishes. The part of the town to the west of the Bann is in Drumcree parish, while the part of the town on the east of the Bann is in Seagoe parish.

=== Protestant churches ===
In 1826, Saint Martin's Church of Ireland (Anglican) was built, and later renamed Saint Mark's. Before this, Church of Ireland members attended either Drumcree Parish Church or Seagoe Parish Church.

The current Seagoe Parish Church of St. Gobhan's (Church of Ireland), was built in 1814. It replaced the many previous church foundations, dating from circa 7th century, that were located about one hundred yards distant. The ancient cemetery of Seagoe is adjacent to this site. The church is linked to Seagoe Primary School, which is maintained by the Church. It is one of the few remaining Anglican primary schools. The former Primus of the Scottish Episcopal Church, Most Revd David Chillingworth was rector at Seagoe for 19 years. St Columba's Parish on the Loughhall Road, and Knocknamuckley Church of Ireland (St. Matthias) on the Bleary Road are also extant parishes.

There are two Presbyterian churches, First Portadown (aka Edenderry) Presbyterian Church (1822) and Armagh Road Presbyterian Church (1859).

The Methodist church has operated at several different sites. It now stands in Thomas Street.

In addition, there are Baptist meeting halls on Thomas Street and Killicomaine Road; an Elim Pentecostal church on Clonavon Avenue; a Quaker meeting hall on Portmore Street; and a large Free Presbyterian congregation meets in Levaghery. The pentecostal Light of the World Ministries are located in the town, as are the evangelical neocharismatic Vineyard Church. The Salvation Army have a hall in Edward Street.

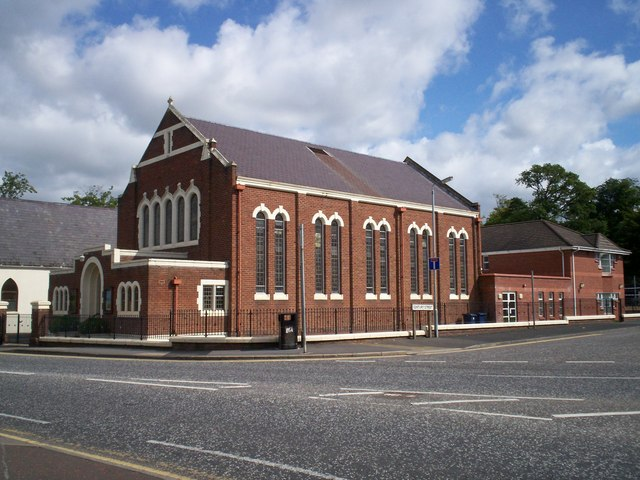
Edenderry Methodist

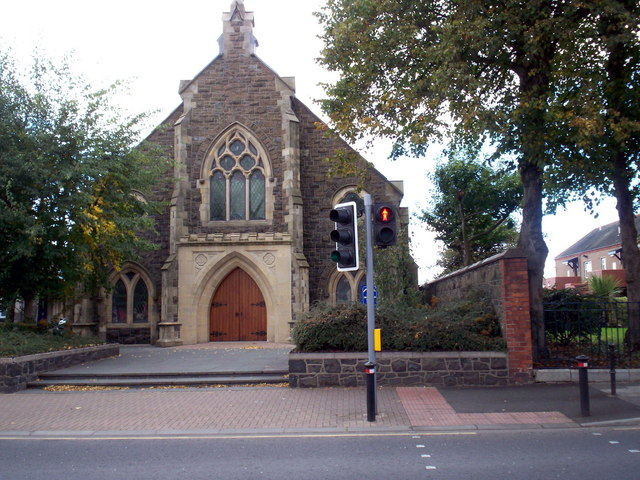
Armagh Road Presbyterian

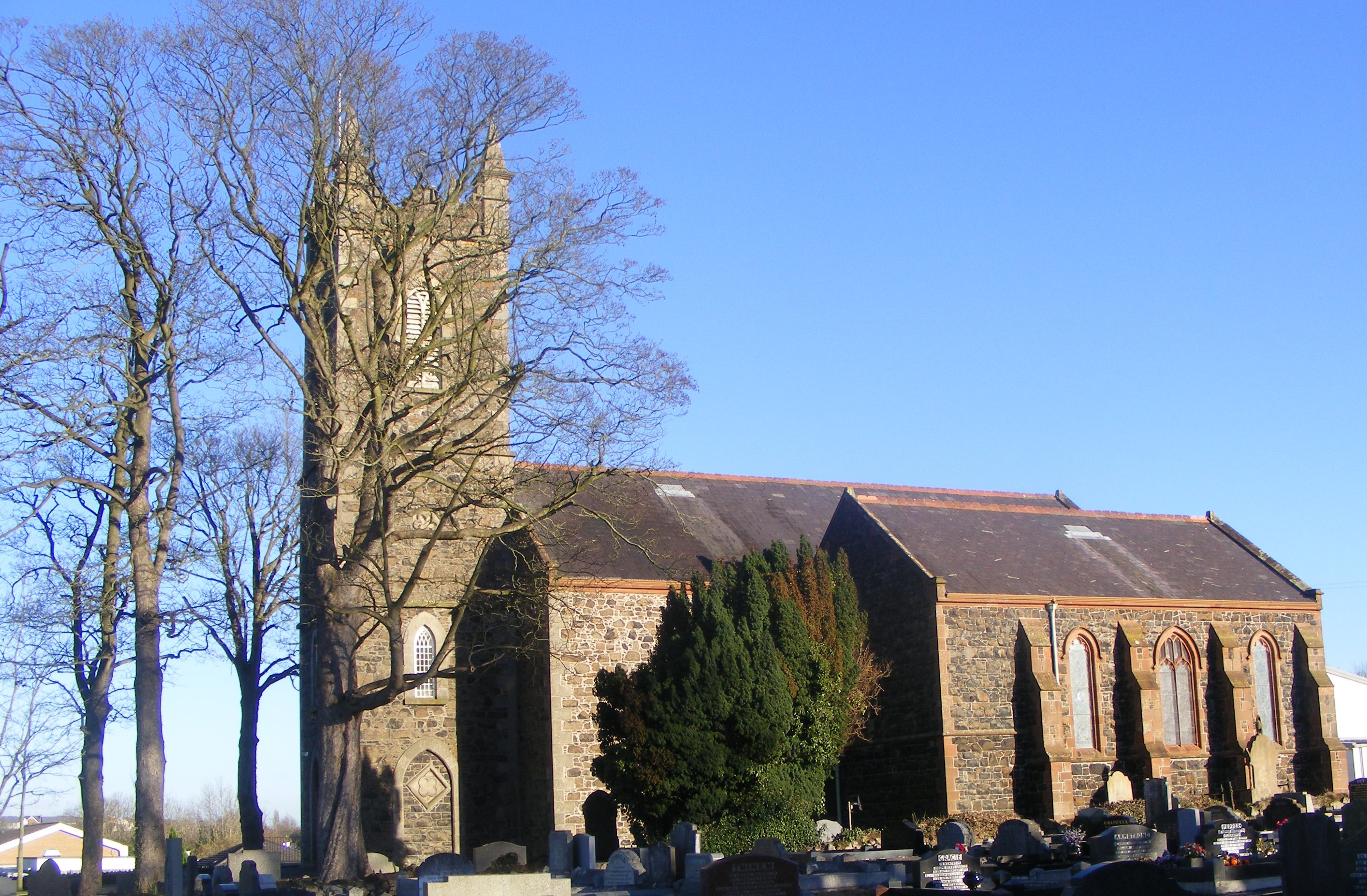
Seagoe Parish

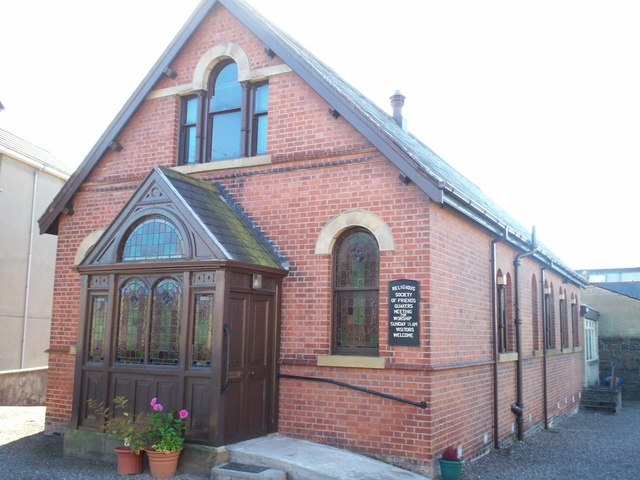
Friends Meeting House

=== Catholic churches ===
Saint John the Baptist's Church was built in the townland of Ballyoran in 1783. The original church had become surrounded by a large graveyard. A second Catholic church, Saint Patrick's, was built on William Street in 1835.

In the 1980s Saint John's was taken down brick-by-brick, moved and rebuilt at the Ulster Folk and Transport Museum in Cultra, County Down. A new Saint John's church was built in 1977 close to where the original stood. It is at the intersection of the Garvaghy Road and the Dungannon Road.

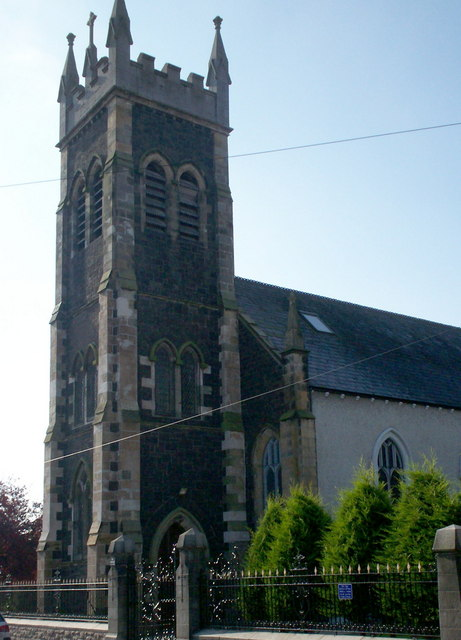
Saint Patrick's Roman Catholic

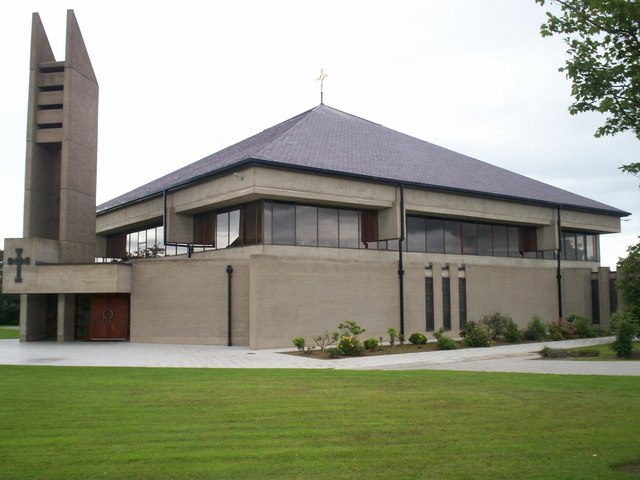
Saint John's Roman Catholic

=== Other churches ===
The Church of Jesus Christ of Latter-day Saints has a church on the Brownstown Road. In addition the Jehovah's Witnesses have a Kingdom Hall, on the town outskirts in Kernan.

== Transport ==
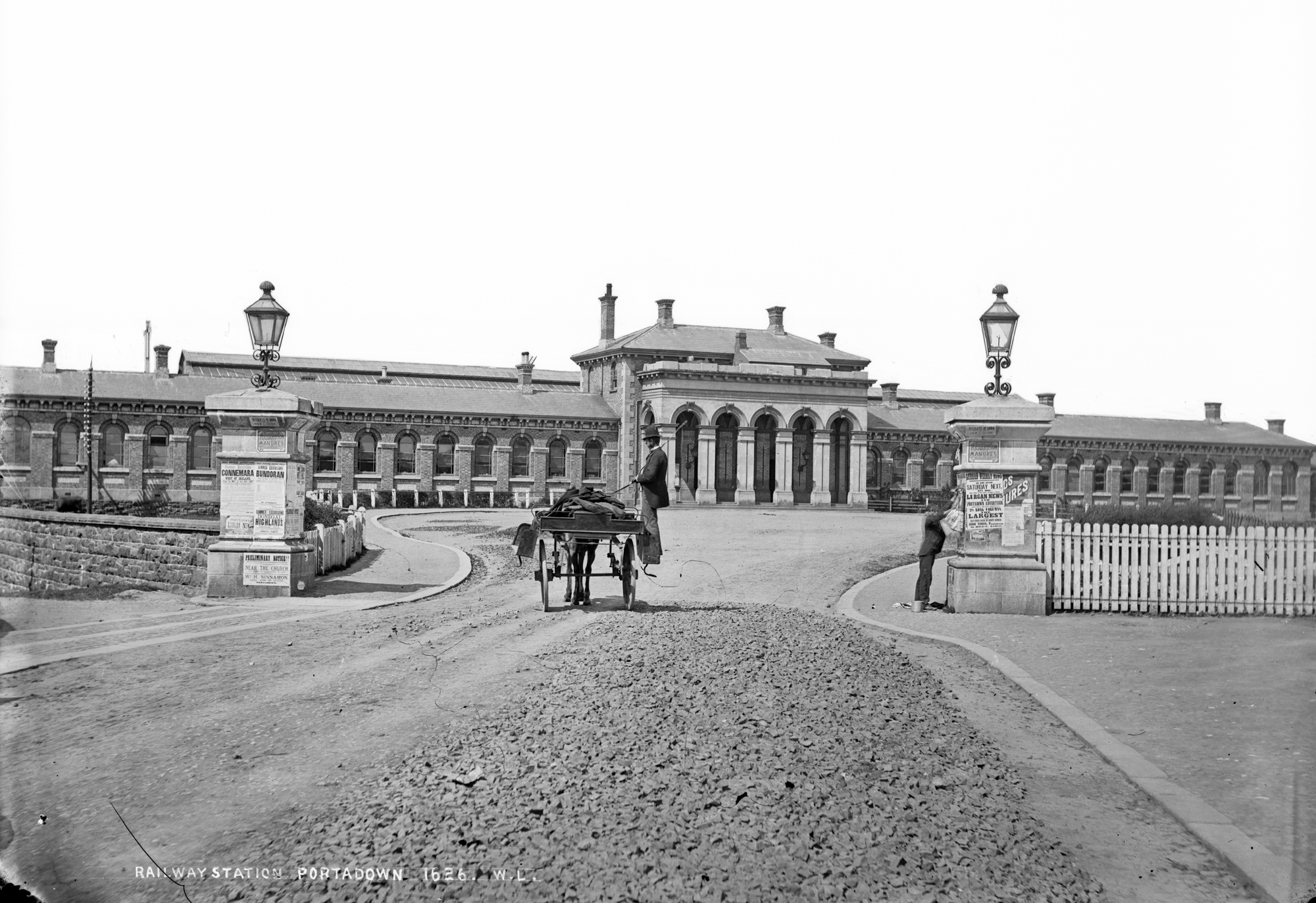
The old railway station in Edenderry (c. 1879)

A combination of road, canal and rail links, all converging on Portadown railway station, gave it the nickname "Hub of the North". This supported employment through mass industry and marketing and shipping of agricultural products from the area. The Newry Canal, opened in 1742, linked Carlingford Lough and the Irish Sea with Lough Neagh. It joined the River Bann a couple of miles to the southeast of Portadown. The canal opened up waterborne trade and left Portadown ideally situated to take full advantage of the trading routes. However, the canal went into decline with the growth of the railway network and it closed to commercial traffic in 1936.

About a century later, establishment of the Great Northern Railway resulted in extending overland trading routes and shortening delivery times shortened. The town's first railway station opened in 1842.

At Portadown railway station, lines were built serving destinations in four directions: one went northeast toward Belfast, one northwest toward Dungannon, one southwest to Armagh, and one southeast toward Newry and onward to Dublin. Today only the Belfast–Dublin line remains. Repair yards were opened in 1925 and these large concrete buildings dominated the skyline on the west of the town centre. The current station opened in 1970.

National Cycle Route 9 links Portadown with Belfast and Newry.

== Economy ==
Portadown's major employers have included:

- Irwin's Bakery was established in 1912 as a grocery retailer by William David Irwin, grandfather of the existing joint managing directors. It expanded into Great Britain and the Republic of Ireland in the 1980s.
- Wade (Ireland) Ltd. Wade Ceramics had a substantial plant in Portadown in Watson Street, Edenderry, adjacent to the Victorian Railway Station. The factory closed in 2002.
- Ulster Carpets Ltd was established in the town in 1938 and was the major employer producing woolen Axminster.
- Henry Denny & Sons (NI) Ltd. meat processors were originally established in Obins Street. It moved to Corcrain after being acquired in 1982 by the Kerry Group.

=== Linen manufacturing ===
Much of the town's industry in the 19th and 20th centuries was centred on the linen trade. The 1881 edition of Slater's Directory (a comprehensive listing of Irish towns) listed 15 manufacturing employers in Portadown at that time.

== Landmarks ==
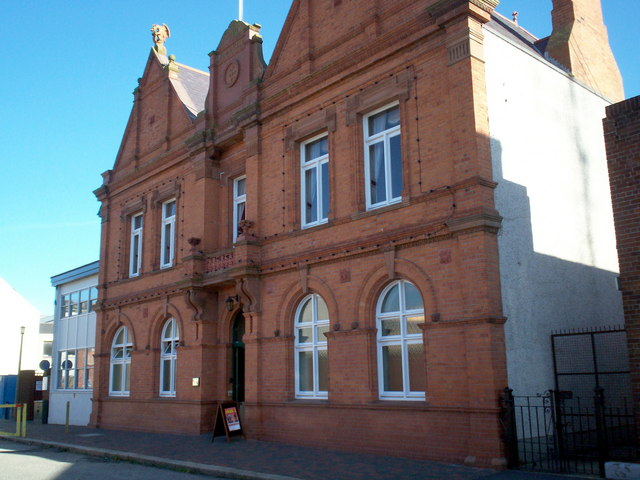
Portadown Town Hall

Portadown Town Hall, in Edward Street, was once the seat of the town's local government. Reforme of local government in 1972 resulted in a change in venue. The Town Hall, an 1890 Victorian building, has been extensively refurbished to offer a commercial in-house theatre and conference facilities.

The Millennium Court Arts Centre contains two galleries featuring exhibits by local artists.

Ardress House is a 17th-century farmhouse that was remodelled in Georgian times. Today it is owned by the National Trust. It is open to the public and offers guided tours, local walks, and recreations of farmyard life.

Carleton Street Orange Hall

Carleton Street Orange Hall was built in 1875 to host the Portadown Orange Order District. Guided tours are offered, with displays and artefacts on show.

The Newry Canal Way is a fully accessible, restored canal towpath now usable as a bicycle route between Newry Town Hall and the Bann Bridge in Portadown. The Canal was the first summit-level canal in Britain and Ireland and has 14 locks between its entrance at Carlingford Lough and the other end at Lough Neagh.

One of the attractions on the Newry Canal Way is Moneypenny's Lock, a site that includes an 18th-century lock-keeper's house, stables and bothy. This provided accommodation for workers on the canal and their horses in the days when the canal was part of the industrial transport network. Today it is administered jointly by the Museum Services and the Lough Neagh Discovery Centre at Oxford Island.

The only fully restored Royal Observer Corps Cold War Nuclear Monitoring Bunker in Northern Ireland is located just outside the town off Dungannon Road. Opened in 1958 it, and an additional 57 other bunkers spread throughout Northern Ireland, would have been used to monitor and report the effects of a Nuclear Attack. The bunker was closed and abandoned in 1991. Nearly 20 years later, it was fully restored to its 1980s appearance and opened as a museum in 2010.

== Notable people ==
=== Deceased people ===
- Harris Boyle (1953–1975) was a high-ranking Ulster Volunteer Force (UVF) member who was blown up when he and another member planted a bomb on the Miami Showband's minibus.
- Marion Greeves MBE (1894–1979) was the first of what have been only two female members of the Senate of Northern Ireland. She served as an independent from June 1950 until June 1969.
- Sir Robert Hart (1835–1911) was a British consular official in China, who served from 1863 to 1911 as the second Inspector-General of China's Imperial Maritime Custom Service (IMCS).
- Eric Mervyn Lindsay OBE (1907–1974) was an astronomer who was instrumental in setting up Armagh Planetarium. He was also responsible for persuading the Irish government and Harvard University to found a telescope at Boyden Station in South Africa for the purpose of charting the southern skies. A crater on the moon has been named after him.
- Harold McCusker (1940–1990) was an Ulster Unionist politician who served as MP for Upper Bann till his death. He was tipped to be a future party leader.
- Robert Russell (c. 1858–1938) was an Irish mathematician and academic who served as Erasmus Smith's Professor of Mathematics at Trinity College Dublin
- Alexander Walker (1930–2003) was a film critic who worked for the Birmingham Post in the 1950s and the London Evening Standard from 1960 until his death. He was a highly influential figure within the film industry and also wrote a number of books on the topic.
- D'Arcy Wentworth (1762–1827), was a surgeon and founder of an Australian political dynasty.
- Billy Wright (1960–1997) was a loyalist paramilitary leader who spent much of his life in Portadown. He led the Mid Ulster Brigade of the UVF before founding a breakaway group called the Loyalist Volunteer Force (LVF) in 1996. He was assassinated by the Irish National Liberation Army (INLA).

=== Living people ===
- Gloria Hunniford (born 1940) is a TV and radio presenter and formerly a singer. She is the mother of Caron Keating.
- Victor Sloan MBE (born 1945) is a photographer and artist who lives and works in Portadown. Employing primarily the medium of photography, he manipulates his negatives and reworks his prints with paints, inks, toners and dyes. He also uses video and printmaking techniques.
- David Simpson (born 1959) is a former Democratic Unionist Party (DUP) Member of Parliament for Upper Bann.
- Brendan McKenna is an Irish republican activist and spokesman of the Garvaghy Road Residents' Coalition. He was a Sinn Féin political adviser until 2007 and became General Secretary of éirígí in 2009.
- Les Binks is a drummer who is best known for having been the drummer of Judas Priest between March 1977 and July 1979.
- Aaron McCusker (born 1978) is an actor most famous for playing Jamie Maguire in Channel 4's comedic drama series Shameless.
- Paddy Johns (born 1968) was an Irish rugby union player from 1990 until 2000; he represented Ulster and Ireland. He played at the 1995 Rugby World Cup finals and the 1999 Rugby World Cup finals.
- Colin Turkington (born 1982) is an auto racing driver and is the reigning British Touring Car Champion.
- Adam Carroll (born 1982) is also an auto racing driver. He raced for A1 Team Ireland in the A1 Grand Prix series and won in 2008-09. Carroll has also raced for FMS International in the GP2 Series.
- Leigh Alderson (born 1986) is a male ballet dancer, model, actor and choreographer. Alderson was nominated for The Arts Personality of the Year Award in the Ulster Tatler Awards in two consecutive years, 2009 and 2010.
- Newton Emerson is a journalist and founder of the satirical online newspaper Portadown News.
- Chris Pennell, English rugby union player, was raised in the town.
- Lady Mary Peters (born 6 July 1939) is a former British athlete, best known for the pentathlon and shotput. She was born in England but relocated at age 11 to Portadown and was educated at Portadown College.
- Michael Andrew Martin O'Neill MBE (5 July 1969) Football manager
- Tim Mullen (born 1976), racing driver

== Education ==
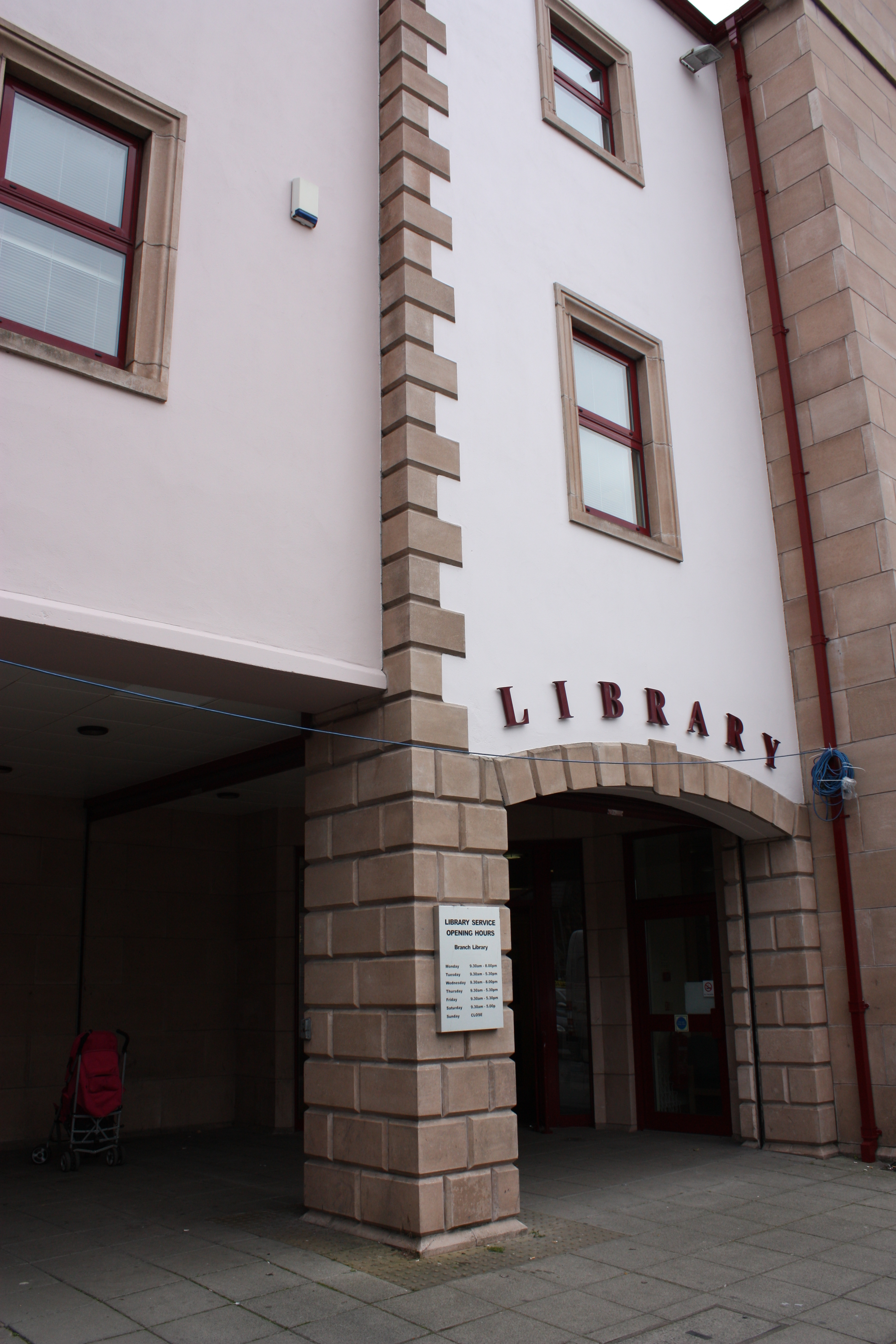
Portadown Library

Portadown has (or had) a large selection of academic institutions, past and present. Today, schools in Portadown operate under the Dickson Plan, a transfer system in north Armagh that allows pupils at age 11 the option of taking the 11-plus exam to enter grammar schools. Pupils in comprehensive junior high schools are sorted into grammar and non-grammar streams. Pupils can get promoted to or demoted from the grammar stream during their time in those schools, depending on the development of their academic performance. At age 14 they can take subject-based exams across the syllabus to qualify for entry into a dedicated grammar school to pursue GCSEs and A-levels.

=== Primary education ===
The state-run Thomas Street Primary School, and Church Street Primary School, formerly the "Duke's School", were both incorporated into Millington Primary School in 1970. Other state-run primary schools include Ballyoran Primary School, Bocombra Primary School, Edenderry Primary School, Hart Memorial Primary School, Moyallan Primary School, Portadown Primary School, Richmount Primary School, and the Anglican Seagoe Primary School. Derrycarne Primary School is now used as an Orange Hall by the Orange Order.

Primary schools managed by the Council for Catholic Maintained Schools are Presentation Convent Primary School, St John the Baptist Primary School (Irish: Bunscoil Eoin Baiste), which has both English-medium and Irish-medium units within it, and St. John's Primary School. St Columba's Primary School in Carleton Street is now closed.

A multi-denominational, integrated primary school, known as Portadown Integrated Primary School, opened in 1990.

=== Post-primary education ===
- Portadown College (Controlled) - a grammar school which opened in 1924
- Clounagh Junior High School (Controlled)
- Craigavon Senior High School (Controlled),
- Killicomaine Junior High School (Controlled)
- St John the Baptist's College (Catholic Maintained)
- Southern Regional College - Portadown Technical College, later Portadown College of Further Education, was merged with Lurgan CFE and Banbridge CFE to form the Upper Bann Institute of Further Education. Further Education in the region was consolidated again when the institute was merged with other FE colleges in Armagh, Newry and Kilkeel to form the Southern Regional College.

== Healthcare ==
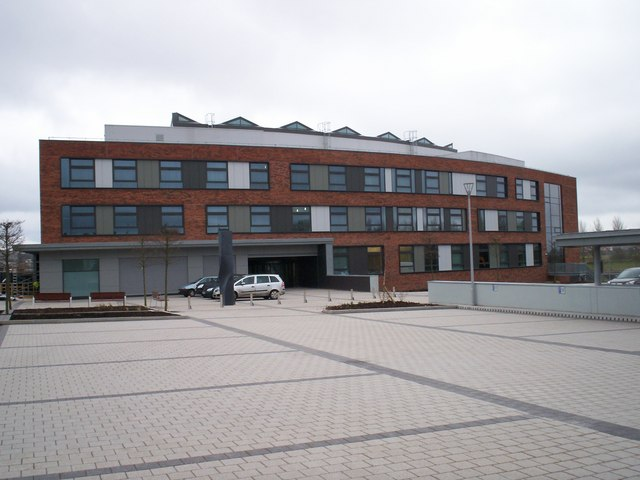
Portadown Health Centre

Access to a GP is provided at Portadown Health Centre. Hospital care and Accident and Emergency services are available at Craigavon Area Hospital, built 1972 on the outskirts of town as part of the Craigavon development.

== Sport ==
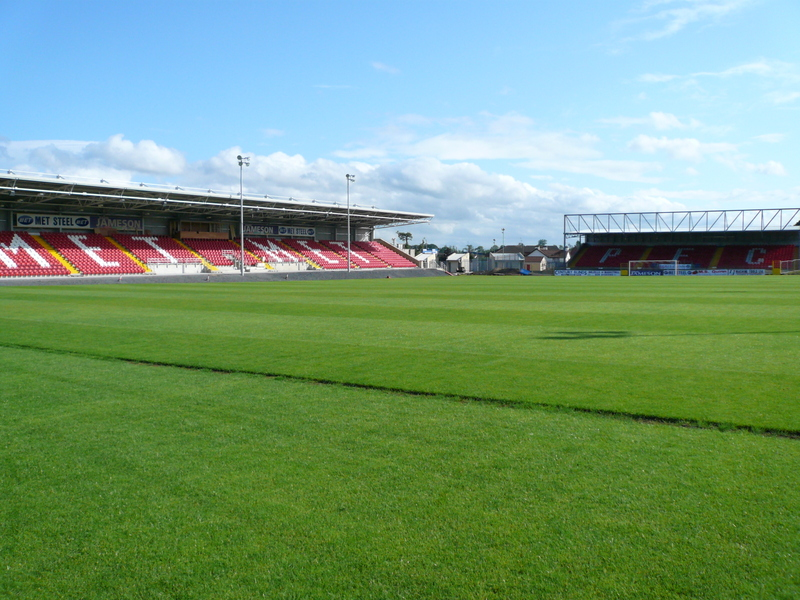
Shamrock Park

Association football is played by Portadown F.C. and Annagh United in the NIFL Championship, and Bourneview Young Men F.C., Hanover F.C., St Mary's Youth F.C. and Seagoe F.C. in the Mid-Ulster Football League.

Rugby is played by Portadown Rugby Club, and Gaelic football is played by Tír na nÓg GAA Club.

== Media ==
Portadown's main local newspaper is the Portadown Times, which is published by Johnston Publishing (NI). Although the newspaper focuses on the Portadown area, it also serves towns and villages across north Armagh. It was founded in 1924 and is issued weekly.

Between 2001 and 2005, Portadown resident Newton Emerson ran a controversial satirical online newspaper called the Portadown News. The website, which was updated biweekly, attracted media attention by poking fun at Northern Ireland politics and culture.

== See also ==
- List of towns in Northern Ireland
- List of villages in Northern Ireland

== Bibliography ==
- Craigavon Borough Council Elections 1993 – 2005
- Culture Northern Ireland
