= Dickson Plan =

School transfer system in Armagh, Northern Ireland

The Dickson Plan is a school transfer system implemented in North County Armagh in Northern Ireland.

It is a two tier system in which many pupils in Craigavon and surrounding areas, such as Portadown and Tandragee, attend Junior High Schools during KS3 before transferring to Senior High Schools to complete their compulsory education during KS4.

Junior High Schools in the Dickson Plan are not academically selective. At age 14, students may transfer to a Grammar school, or to a non-selective secondary school. Pupils can transfers to schools that implement the Dickson Plan as well as schools which follow the more common 11–16 or 11–18 approach.

The Dickson Plan wasn't affected by the 2008 education reforms which removed academic selection in the rest of Northern Ireland.

In the early 2010s, Education Minister John O'Dowd intended to abolish the Dickson Plan, by amalgamating the Junior and Senior Highs, with the decision being approved by the Southern Education and Library Board. Overwhelming parental support for the Dickson plan, with more than 80% of local parents supporting the system, led to these plans being scrapped.

In 2015, three Catholic schools (St Paul's Junior High, St Mary's Junior High and St Michael's Grammar) within the Lurgan area opted out of the Dickson plan and amalgamated to form a new school, St Ronan's College. It is a non-selective co-educational Catholic comprehensive school which caters for up to 1,750+ pupils. A new building had been under construction since 2021, and opened in September 2025.
