= Portadown News =

Northern Irish newspaper

- Type: Weekly Newspaper
- Format: Tabloid
- Owner: James Morton
- Founded: 1859
- Language: English

The Portadown News was a weekly newspaper based in Portadown, Northern Ireland. It was established in 1859 as the Portadown Weekly News, and County Armagh Advertiser. It served the communities of Portadown, Lurgan, Craigavon and the wider County Armagh Area. From 1888–1903, it was known as The Portadown & Lurgan News, and Tenant Farmers' Gazette. The name was changed by to simply The Portadown News until 1956.

The Portadown News gained success and became the staple newspaper in Portadown, outperforming the Portadown Times. This was until the 1950s when the Times was taken over by James Morton, and went on to overtake the News in circulation. Morton took over the News in the early 1970s and ran both as a bi-weekly operation when it was known as the Portadown News and Craigavon Times. This continued for a decade until he made the decision to close the Portadown News in 1982.

In March 2019, the archives were digitized and uploaded to the British Newspaper Archive.
