= Whistle (disambiguation) =

A whistle is a single-note woodwind instrument, in the percussion section of the orchestra, and with many other applications in sport and other fields.

Whistle may also refer to:

== Music ==
- Whistle (band), a 1980s hip-hop band

=== Songs ===
- "Whistle" (Blackpink song), 2016
- "Whistle" (Flo Rida song), 2012
- "Whistle" (Jax Jones and Calum Scott song), 2023
- "Whistle" (Kylie Minogue and múm song), 2013
- "Whistle (While You Work It)", a 2015 song by British recording artist Katy Tiz
- "Whistle (North Korean song)", a 1990 song released by Pochonbo Electronic Ensemble.

=== Other ===
- Whistle register, in singing, the highest register of the human voice
- Whistling
- Tin whistle or pennywhistle

== Literature ==
- Whistle (novel), a 1978 novel by James Jones, the final volume in his World War II trilogy
- Whistle!, a 1998 manga by Daisuke Higuchi

== Film ==
- The Whistle (film), a 1921 American silent drama film directed by Lambert Hillyer
- Whistle, a 2002 short film by Duncan Jones
- Whistle (2003 film), a 2003 South Indian Tamil film
- Whistle (2013 film), a 2013 South Indian Kannada film
- Bigil, a 2019 Tamil film dubbed into Telugu as Whistle
- Whistle (2025 film), a 2025 Canadian-Irish film
- Whistle (2025 documentary film), a 2025 Australian documentary film directed by Christopher Nelius

== Science and technology ==
- Liquid whistle, a device for mixing and emulsification
- Steam whistle, a device used to produce sound in the form of a whistle using pressurized steam
- Train whistle, an audible signaling device on a steam locomotive
- Whistle (unidentified sound)
- Physics of whistles

== Places ==
- Whistle Cove, a cove in South Georgia
- Whistle Lake, a lake in Anacortes, Washington, USA
- Whistle Pass, a snow pass on Alexander Island in Antarctica

== People with the surname ==
- Rob Whistle (born 1961), Canadian ice hockey player

== Others ==
- Whistle (company), a subsidiary of Mars Petcare
- Whistle (organisation), a West Ham United F.C. supporters' pressure group
- Whistle (superhero), a fictional DC Comics character
- Whistled language
- Whistle Orange Soda, a soft drink made by Vess
- A unit of time used in Indian cooking
- Whistle, or whistle and flute, rhyming slang for suit

== See also ==
- Whistler (disambiguation)
- Whistleblower (disambiguation)
- Whistle Stop (disambiguation)
