= StreamYard =

Live streaming and webinar software

StreamYard, Inc.
- Release: July 12, 2018; 8 years ago
- Platform: Android, iOS, Web app
- Type: Live streaming software, webinar software
- License: Freeware
- Website: streamyard.com

StreamYard (officially StreamYard, Inc.) is a live streaming and webinar software developed by Geige Vandentop and Dan Briggs and based in Tualatin, Oregon. In 2018, the software was released for use on the web.

The software expanded into an application available for download in the Apple App Store. On January 7, 2021, software company Hopin acquired StreamYard for $250 million. On April 9, 2024, technology company Bending Spoons confirmed it has agreed to acquire StreamYard Top Corp (also known as Hopin), which owns and operates the products StreamYard, Streamable, and Superwave.

== Background ==
StreamYard is used by artists, live-streamers and webinar hosts from around the world to broadcast video online. It is also a common way for online live-stream hosts to bring guests on their broadcast.

The format of StreamYard is similar to that of its discontinued counterpart, Google Hangouts, which was replaced by Google Chat in 2019. The host of the broadcast utilizes a shareable link to invite friends or guests to be part of the broadcast or meeting.

=== Supported platforms ===
Web browsers such as Google Chrome, Opera, and Firefox support StreamYard.

StreamYard allows broadcasting to platforms including Facebook, YouTube, Instagram, LinkedIn, X (formerly Twitter), Kick, Brightcove, Hopin, Vimeo and Twitch.
