= Evernote Corporation =

American software company

- Type: Private
- Industry: Productivity Technology
- Founded: 2004; 22 years ago in Sunnyvale, California, United States
- Founder: Stepan Pachikov
- Headquarters: Redwood City, California, United States
- Number of locations: 7 (Redwood City, Austin, San Diego, Beijing, New Delhi, Tokyo, Zurich)
- Key people: Francesco Patarnello (CEO)
- Products: Evernote
- Parent: Bending Spoons
- Website: evernote.com

Evernote Corporation is a privately owned company headquartered in Redwood City, California that develops Evernote. Its current CEO, Francesco Patarnello, has been in his position since January 2023 following the acquisition by Bending Spoons. Evernote has domestic offices in Austin, San Diego, and Bothell, Washington. It has international offices in India, Switzerland, Chile, and Japan. As of February 2023, the company employed nearly 400 people.

== History ==
After being founded in 2004 by Russian–American computer entrepreneur Stepan Pachikov, EverNote Corporation ('EverNote' stylized with a capital 'N' at the time) started marketing software for Windows desktop PCs, tablet PCs and handheld devices like the handwriting recognition software ritePen and the note-taking and web clipping application EverNote (also with a capital 'N'), a Windows application which stored notes on an 'infinite roll of paper'. Under new CEO Phil Libin, the company shifted its focus to the Web, smartphones and also the Apple Mac, starting with Evernote (now with lower-case 'n') 3.0 in 2008. The Evernote Web service launched into open beta on June 24, 2008, and reached 11 million users in July 2011. In October 2010, the company raised a US$20 million funding round led by DoCoMo Capital with participation from Morgenthaler Ventures and Sequoia Capital. Since then, the company raised an additional $50 million in funding led by Sequoia Capital and Morgenthaler Ventures, and another $70 million in funding led by Meritech Capital and CBC Capital. On November 30, 2012, Evernote raised another $85 million in funding led by AGC Equity Partners/m8 Capital and Valiant Capital Partners. On November 9, 2014, Evernote raised an additional $20 million in funding from Nikkei, Inc.

On May 7, 2013, TechCrunch reported that Evernote launched Yinxiang Biji Business into the Chinese market at the Global Mobile Internet Conference.

Linda Kozlowski was named chief operating officer of Evernote in June 2015, but left before the end of the year.

Libin stepped down as CEO in July 2015 and was replaced by former Google Glass executive Chris O'Neill, but remained Executive Chairman. In October 2015, Evernote announced it would lay off 18 percent of its workforce and close three out of 10 global offices. In September 2016, Libin stepped down as executive chairman. In February 2017, CEO O'Neill said in a blog post that the business was cash-flow positive.

In August 2018, Chief Technical Officer Anirban Kundu, Chief Financial Officer Vincent Toolan, Chief Product Officer Erik Wrobel, and head of HR Michelle Wagner left the company. Wrobel and Wagner both joined in 2016. On September 18, 2018, 54 employees—about 15 percent of the workforce—were laid off. In a blog post, O'Neill said, "After a successful 2017, I set incredibly aggressive goals for Evernote in 2018. Though we have steadily grown, we committed too many resources too quickly. We built up areas of our business in ways that have proven to be inefficient. Going forward, we are streamlining certain functions, like sales, so we can continue to speed up and scale others, like product development and engineering."

On October 29, 2018, Evernote announced that Ian Small, former CEO of TokBox, would replace O'Neill as CEO of Evernote.

In January 2023, Evernote was acquired by Bending Spoons, an Italian mobile app development company. At the same time Francesco Patarnello took over as CEO from Ian Small.

In February of 2023, Bending Spoons laid off 129 Evernote staffers. In April of 2023 the firm announced upcoming price increases and new features. In July 2023, Evernote relocated its center of operations from the US to Europe, which is where parent company Bending Spoons is headquartered, and laid off all existing employees.

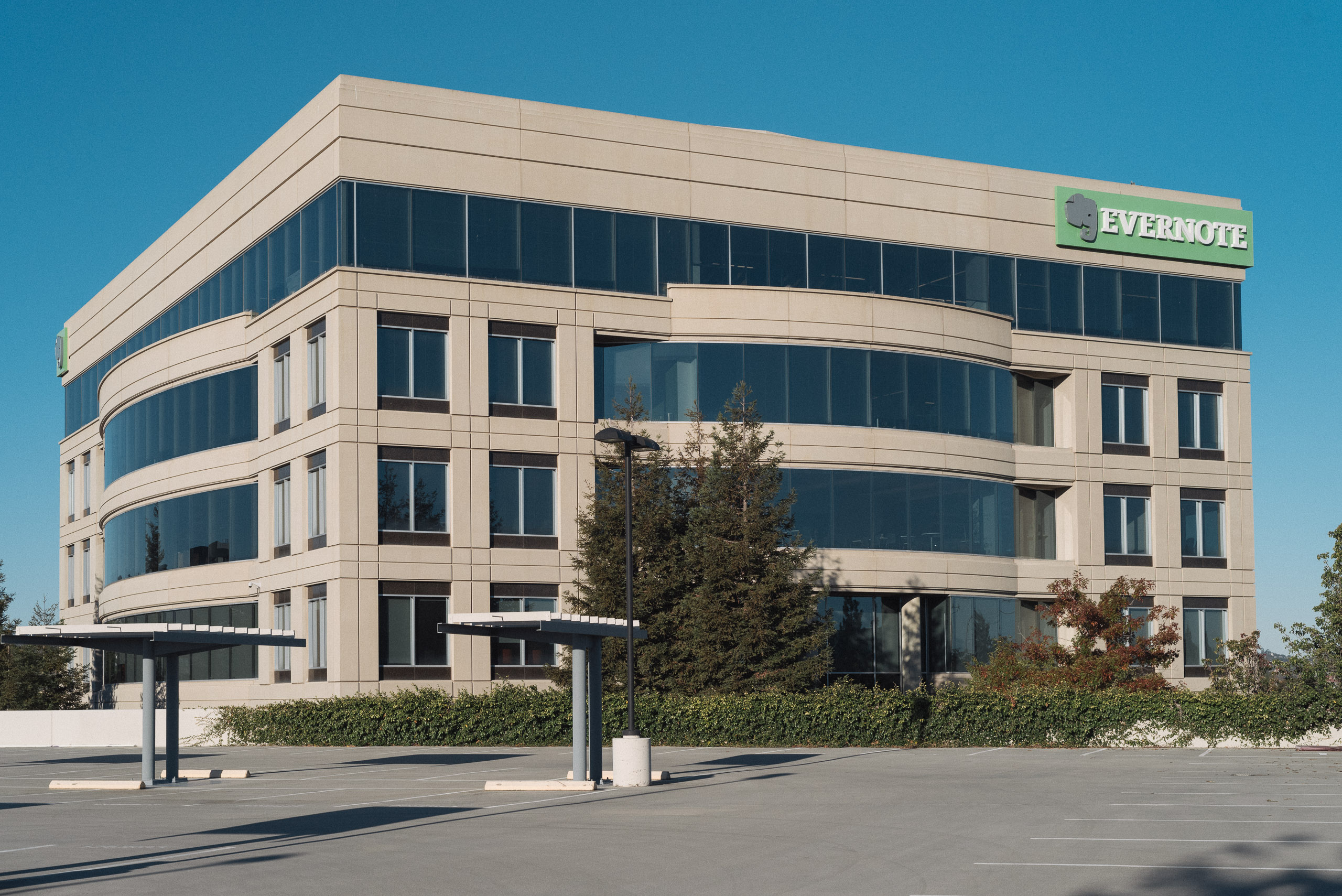
Evernote Corporation's headquarters in Redwood City, California (2016)

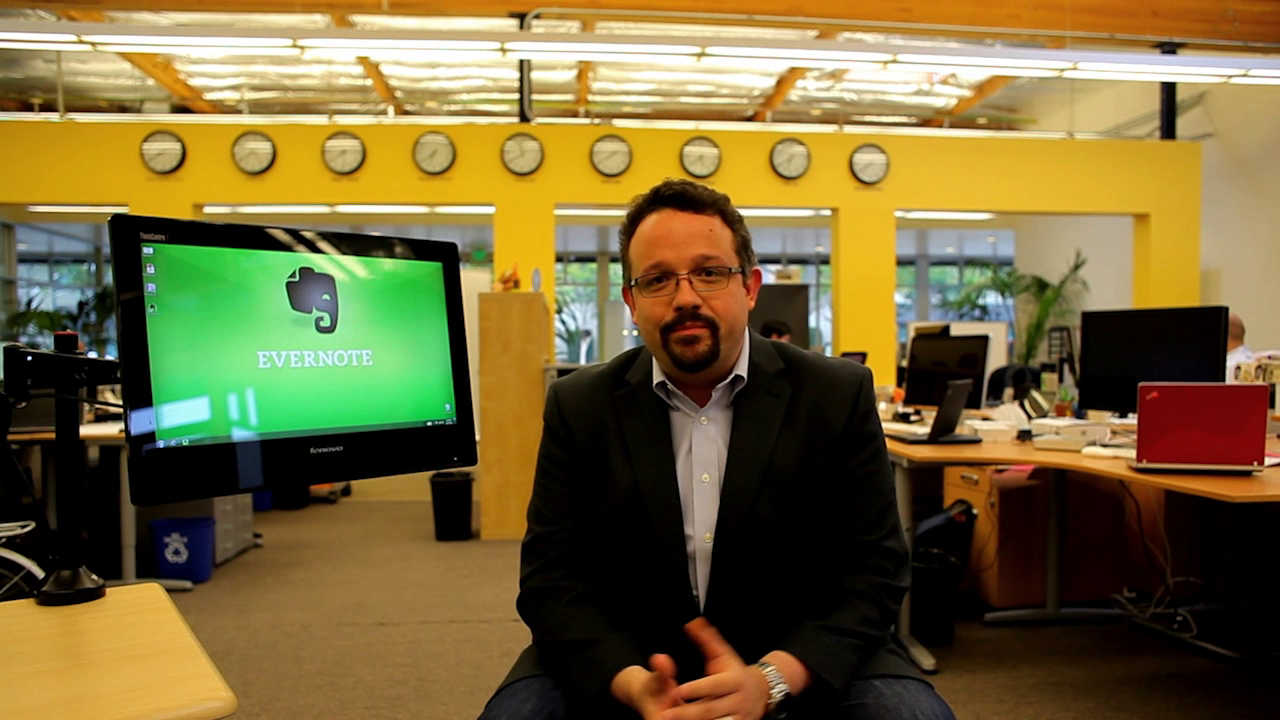
Phil Libin, co-founder, former CEO, and former executive chairman of the Evernote Corporation
