= Bending spoons =

Bending Spoons may refer to:

- Bending Spoons S.p.A., Italian technology conglomerate
- Spoon bending, magic trick involving the deformation of spoons
