= GNUKhata =

Indian accounting software

- Original author: Krishnakant Mane
- Stable release: 2.6.1 / January 27, 2016; 10 years ago
- Repository: https://gitlab.com/gnukhata/core_engine
- Written in: Python (programming language)
- License: GNU Affero General Public License
- Website: gnukhata.org

GNUKhata is an Indian accounting libreware. It was developed by Krishnakant Mane, a visually-impaired computer engineer and supporter of the GNU Free Software movement. It is based on the double-entry bookkeeping system.

== About the software ==
GNUKhata is developed by the visually-impaired software professional Krishnakant Mane who has stressed his goal "to make technology work for the underprivileged" through his Digital Freedom Foundation. GNUKhata has been described as "an [Indian-focused] accounting and inventory software".

Ankush Das, writing in ITSFOSS.com, describes the product as: "GNU Khata is an accounting tool. Or shall I say a collection of accounting tools? It is like the Evernote of economy management. It is so versatile that it can be used from personal Finance management to large scale business management, from store inventory management to corporate tax works."

== Developer ==
The GNUKhata ('Khata' meaning account in Hindi) program was created by Krishnakant Mane, who is a software developer and engineer from the locality of Dadar in Mumbai, who is visually-impaired and lost his eyesight at the age of three.
