= Sirron Norris =

American illustrator and commercial artist

- Born: 1972 or 1973 (age 53–54); Cleveland, Ohio, U.S.
- Education: Art Institute of Pittsburgh
- Occupations: illustrator, designer, muralist, arts educator
- Website: http://www.sirronnorris.com

Sirron Norris is an American illustrator, muralist, and arts educator. He is known for his work on the FOX animated television show Bob's Burgers and for numerous cartoon-style public murals, including ones at Balmy Alley, Clarion Alley, and Mission Dolores Park, and galleries around San Francisco. His murals often include political messages, local themes, and his signature blue bear. He has worked with several local non-profits, including SPUR and El Tecolote.

Norris' studio and gallery is based in the Mission District, San Francisco.

== Early life ==
Norris was born in Cleveland, Ohio. He is from a Black family, and has cited in interviews how living in the Midwest was a difficult experience.

Norris graduated from the Art Institute of Pittsburgh and moved to San Francisco from Pittsburgh in 1997.

== Career ==
=== Murals ===
Norris began painting murals in 1999 as a means of advertising his work. His first mural is located outside a corner store at the intersection of 20th and Bryant Street. Prior to this, he worked in video game graphics and had no formal training in painting murals.

Some works can also be found indoors, such as his murals in the pediatric emergency rooms of the Zuckerberg San Francisco General Hospital, funded through the support of the San Francisco Arts Commission, and SPUR. Norris was commissioned to paint a Mickey Mouse mural at the Walt Disney Family Museum in 2019.

=== Bob's Burgers ===
Norris was the lead artist on the television pilot of Bob's Burgers and designed the backgrounds for the show. The exterior buildings were inspired by the homes around him in the Mission District. Show creator Loren Bouchard lived down the street from him and was hiring local artists to work on the pilot, which included the show's character designer Jay Howell. In 2016, he painted a mural of Bob and Linda Belcher from the show on the outside of the house he resided in while working on the show. It was removed by the homeowner in 2017 due to copyright concerns.

=== Illustration and design work ===
Norris designed the poster for the San Francisco Public Library Summer Read SF program in 2012.

In 2013, Norris collaborated on a line of wristwatch bands for an activity tracker with the now defunct health start-up Basis. In 2017, he was commissioned by Whistle Labs to paint a mural outside the Dog Eared Books bookstore for a charitable promotional campaign.

Norris was featured in the 2018 collection of Hearts in San Francisco benefitting the San Francisco General Hospital Foundation.

== Reception ==
His critics have claimed that since his work is commercial in nature, he is "selling out or betraying the street art tradition" and perceive him to be a "gentrification" artist." Some have vandalized his works with graffiti. However, while he has been commissioned by large companies such as Mitsubishi and Sony, Norris is a self-proclaimed commercial artist and doesn't describe his murals as "street art." His "Victorion: El Defensor de la Mission" mural, painted in 2007, features an anthropomorphized giant robot assembled with Victorian homes tackling the issues of gentrification within the Mission District.

In 2010, he was met with community backlash when he was commissioned to paint over an existing mural in the Mission District. He has also since apologized about repainting the existing mural and has worked with the original artist on a new piece at the same location.

=== Awards and recognition ===
In 2000, he was the artist-in-residence at the De Young Museum. In 2002, he was the artist-in-residence at the Yerba Buena Center for the Arts. In 2005, he spent three months as an artist-in-residence at Recology.

In 2017, he received the "Greater Bay Area Journalism Award" for "Kaepernick" in El Tecolote, a part of his ongoing political comic series entitled "Cityfruit".
