= Guardly =

Canadian security company

- Type: Private
- Industry: Corporate Security
- Founded: 2010
- Founder: Josh Sookman
- Headquarters: Toronto, Ontario, Canada
- Area served: Worldwide
- Key people: Josh Sookman, CEO
- Products: Enterprise Mobile Safety Platform; Mobile Safety Apps; Incident Management System; Indoor Positioning System; Mobile Mass Notification System
- Website: www.guardly.com

Guardly is a Canadian-based security company with headquarters in Toronto. In July 2022, SmartLocksGuide.com acquired Guardly. The company designs and provides mobile safety and security solutions for enterprise organizations, campuses, and municipalities. It is best known for its mobile safety application that allows users to connect to security, public authorities and a list of emergency contacts when the safety app is activated. Guardly is also attributed as the first company to offer an indoor positioning system to locate users who are within a building during an emergency, and the first to offer a mass notification system that integrates with indoor positioning data to locate people in need of help. The company's technology was featured on the Discovery Channel’s Future Tech TV series.

== History ==
Guardly was founded in 2010 by Josh Sookman, the company's current CEO. Prior to Guardly, he worked for both BlackBerry Partners Fund and RBC Venture Partners. The company received an undisclosed amount in its first round of Seed Funding in September 2011, led by Golden Venture Partners and Extreme Venture Partners, with a matching contribution from the Federal Economic Development Agency for Southern Ontario (FedDev Ontario). Guardly raised another $1.45 million in January 2014 during a second Seed Funding Round, led by Freestyle Capital with participation from Golden Venture Partners and the MaRS Investment Accelerator Fund.

Guardly was founded as a personal security application for consumers. In the event of an emergency, the app would notify a set of contacts chosen by the user as well as alert authorities. By September 2012 Guardly began to partner with educational organizations to implement its software into campus security systems on campus. During the same quarter, Guardly expanded its offerings by partnering with other companies that also sold products into the educational market including Code Blue Corp, a manufacturer of Blue Light Phones used on college campuses as a way to notify campus police from various locations on campus. The partnership expanded upon Code Blue's technological capabilities by including Guardly mobile safety applications as a new endpoint from which to report emergencies to campus police. The app allowed campus security to identify the user and track their movements once the app was activated. Guardly also partnered with Desire2Learn in 2012, presenting its app as an add on to Desire2Learn's Campus Life mobile app.

In 2013, the Crime Prevention Association of Toronto partnered with Guardly to implement the company's technologies into neighborhood watch programs. Guardly's mobile mass notification system was integrated into an app called notifEYE, later launched by the Crime Prevention Association of Toronto. In January 2014 the company began to branch out into enterprise security solutions. The infrastructure includes a variety of smartphones coupled with its mobile safety applications, its indoor positioning system, and its incident management application.

== Products and services ==
Guardly provides an enterprise mobile safety platform for communication and emergency notification. It incorporates cloud, mobile, indoor positioning, and real time tracking. The Guardly Safety app allows users to communicate with dispatch by phone and secure instant messaging, while tracking real-time location. The app has the ability to allow users to connect to a select group of their contacts as well as authorities in the event of an emergency. The contacts are connected through conference call and instant messaging and also allows for location tracking when activated by the user. Guardly added an indoor positioning system to its app in 2013.

Guardly's incident management system provides web based incident management and assistance to dispatch personnel for monitoring and managing emergency situations. During an incident, dispatchers can speak with the caller by phone or text and view photos sent by end users of the system. The system is configurable to monitor for alerts within multiple geographical regions using the company's geofencing technology and routing information to multiple security operation centers or sites.

Guardly's Indoor Positioning System is said to be able to show a rough geographical location and also transmit a specific floor and a specific room where someone in an emergency is located. The company further expanded its offerings with a mobile mass notification system. The system allows mass notification to up to 500,000 people within a geotargeted area and can be used in conjunction with the indoor positioning system.
