= List of Jewish comic book characters =

This is a list of fictional Jewish comic book characters. Characters on this list range from secular with Jewish parentage to fully practicing. These are characters specific to comic-book universes; characters from TV or film universes are not present on this list, nor are characters from autobiographical/memoir comics such as Maus and American Splendor.

== DC Comics ==
- Atom Smasher
- Colossal Boy
- Doctor Manhattan
- The Kane family
  - Batman (Bruce Wayne)
  - Batwoman (Kate Kane)
  - Martha Wayne
  - Alice (Beth Kane)
- Hal Jordan
- Harley Quinn
- Morgan Edge
- Nite Owl
- Nyssa Raatko
- Phantom Stranger
- Ragman
- Seraph
- Sandman
- Whistle

== Marvel Comics ==
- Arnie Roth
- Doc Samson
- Dominic Fortune
- Gertrude Yorkes
- Iceman
- Kitty Pryde
- Legion
- Magneto
- Mettle
- Moon Knight
- Polaris Magneto's daughter
- Quicksilver (Marvel Comics) Magneto's son
- Robert Grayson
- Sabra
- Sasquatch
- Scarlet Witch, Magneto's daughter
- Shadow Knight
- Songbird
- Speed (character) Scarlet Witch's son
- Thing
- Vance Astrovik
- Wiccan Scarlet Witch's son

== Other comic presses ==
- Dark Horse Comics
  - The Escapist
- First Comics
  - Reuben Flagg
- Image Comics:
  - Masada
- In 2010, Judaica Press published an educational comic about the Jewish Hero Corps, targeted at Jewish children.
  - Dreidel Maidel
  - Kippah Kid
  - Magen David
  - Matzah Woman
  - Menorah Man
  - Minyan Man
  - Shabbos Queen
- Malibu Comics
  - Prime
- Mendy Enterprises/The Golem Factory
  - Mendy Klein
  - Rivkie Klein
  - Yaakov Klein
  - Sara Klein
  - Reb Zushe
- New England Comics
  - Arthur
- Wildstorm Comics
  - Sublime

== See also ==
- List of comic creators
