= Braintrust =

Artificial intelligence software company

- Type: Private
- Industry: Artificial intelligence
- Founded: August 2023; 3 years ago
- Founder: Ankur Goyal
- Headquarters: San Francisco, California, U.S.
- Area served: Worldwide
- Key people: Ankur Goyal (CEO)
- Products: AI evaluation and observability software
- Website: www.braintrust.dev

Braintrust is an American artificial intelligence software company that develops evaluation and observability tools for large language model (LLM) applications and AI systems. The company was founded in 2023 by Ankur Goyal and is headquartered in San Francisco, California.

== History ==
Braintrust was founded in August 2023 by Ankur Goyal, a co-founder of Impira and former head of machine learning platform at Figma. The company was initially incubated by investor Elad Gil.

In December 2023, Braintrust raised US$5.1 million in seed funding led by Greylock Partners. In October 2024, the company raised US$36 million in a Series A funding round led by Andreessen Horowitz, valuing the company at approximately US$150 million.

In February 2026, Braintrust raised US$80 million in a Series B funding round led by ICONIQ Capital, with participation from existing investors including Andreessen Horowitz and Greylock. That month, the company held its first user conference, Trace, at the California Academy of Sciences in San Francisco.

== Technology ==
Braintrust develops software for evaluating, monitoring, and improving AI model outputs and application performance. The company developed a database architecture known as Brainstore for storing and querying AI observability data. Braintrust also developed tools including Loop, an AI-assisted workflow system for generating prompts and evaluation datasets, and Braintrust Gateway, a proxy layer for routing and monitoring AI model calls. Companies publicly associated with the platform include Notion, Stripe, and Airtable.
