= Remini (application) =

Photo manipulation application

- Developer: Bending Spoons
- Release: July 21, 2021; 5 years ago
- Operating system: iOS, Android, Web browser
- Type: Image editing
- License: Freemium
- Website: https://remini.ai

Remini is a mobile application originally developed by Chinese developer BigWinePot Inc, that uses artificial intelligence (AI) to alter, restore, and enhance images and videos. In June 2021, Remini was acquired by Italian technology conglomerate Bending Spoons.

While Remini has a limited set of free tools available, the app requires a subscription for use of most features. Currently, the app relies on Google's Nano Banana image generation models to create content.

== Features ==
Remini was initially known for restoring and improving the quality of blurry or low-resolution images by using deep learning and models to increase their sharpness and clarity. Further, the app can remove scratches and improve faded colours from old photographs.

Remini also includes a number of artistic "AI filters" which use image generation to emulate a number of different visual styles, such as making an image appear to be made from clay or look like a painting. Other popular filters include one that can create an image showing two people what their children may look like or another that generates a professional headshot-like portrait. Users are required to upload 8-12 photos of themselves under a variety of conditions and angles for the program to draw their likeness from, however some have criticised Remini for making unnecessary changes to their bodies in generated images.

== See also ==
- Facetune
- FaceApp
- VSCO
