= One Front Street =

Office skyscraper in San Francisco, California

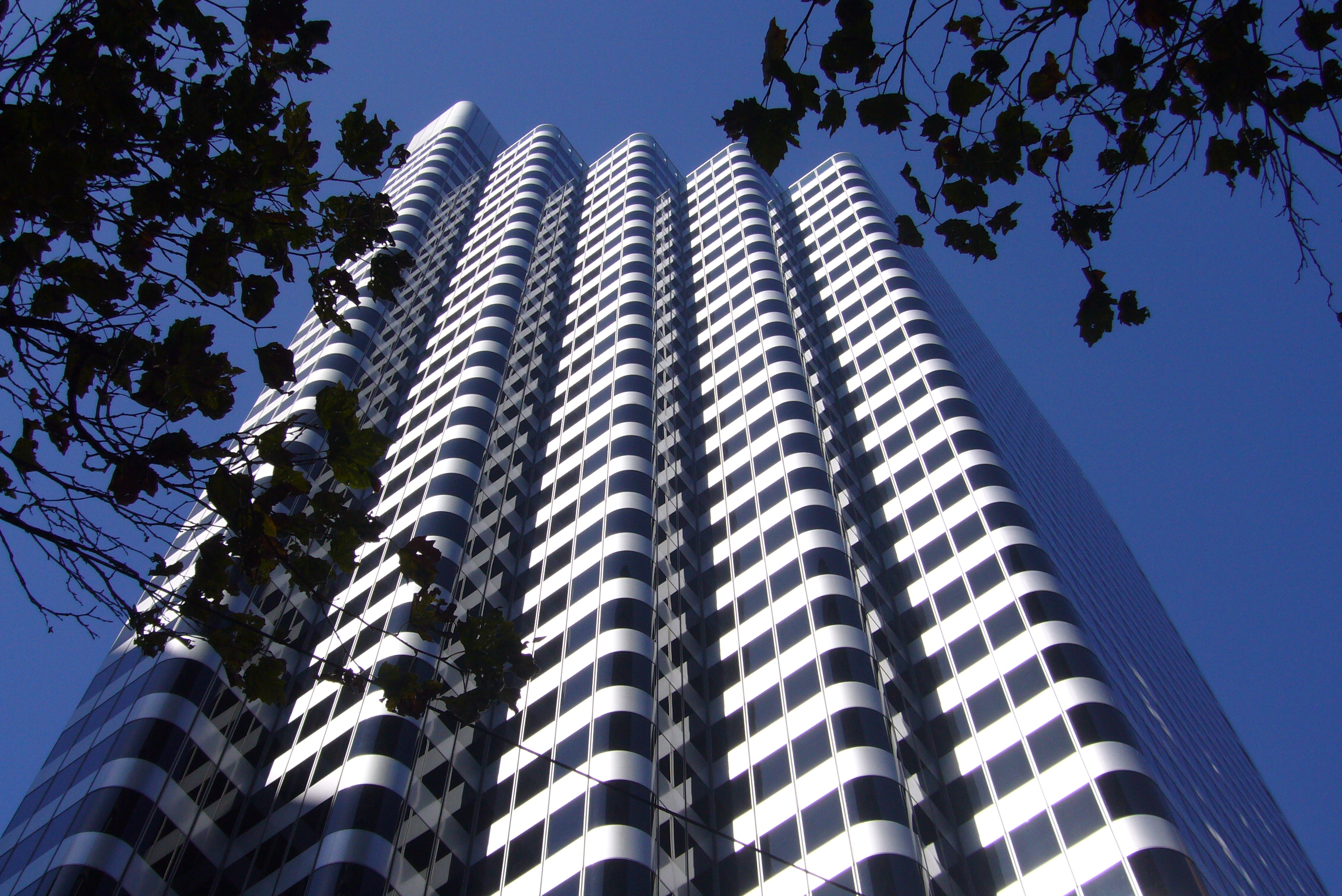
- Interactive map of the One Front Street area
- Former names: Shaklee Terraces; 444 Market Street

General information
- Type: Commercial offices
- Location: One Front Street; San Francisco, California
- Coordinates: 37.791806°N 122.398806°W
- Completed: 1979
- Owner: One Front Street Owner LP (Paramount Group, Inc.)
- Operator: Paramount Group, Inc.

Height
- Roof: 164 m (538 ft)

Technical details
- Floor count: 38
- Floor area: 638,000 sq ft (59,300 m^{2})
- Lifts/elevators: 17

Design and construction
- Architect: Skidmore, Owings & Merrill

One Front Street, formerly known as Shaklee Terraces, is an office skyscraper in the Financial District of San Francisco, California. The 164 m (538 ft), 38-floor tower was completed in 1979, at which point the official address was 444 Market Street. The address was later changed as the number 4 is seen as causing bad luck in many Asian cultures. The composition of the façade closely resembles that of the Shell Building by Emil Fahrenkamp, which was built in Berlin in 1931. The Shaklee Corporation was once headquartered in the tower until the company relocated its corporate operations to east suburban Pleasanton in 1999. In 1999-2001 Scient Corporation, a dot-com era consulting firm, had its head office on the upper floors of the building, prior to its move to Southern Pacific Building.

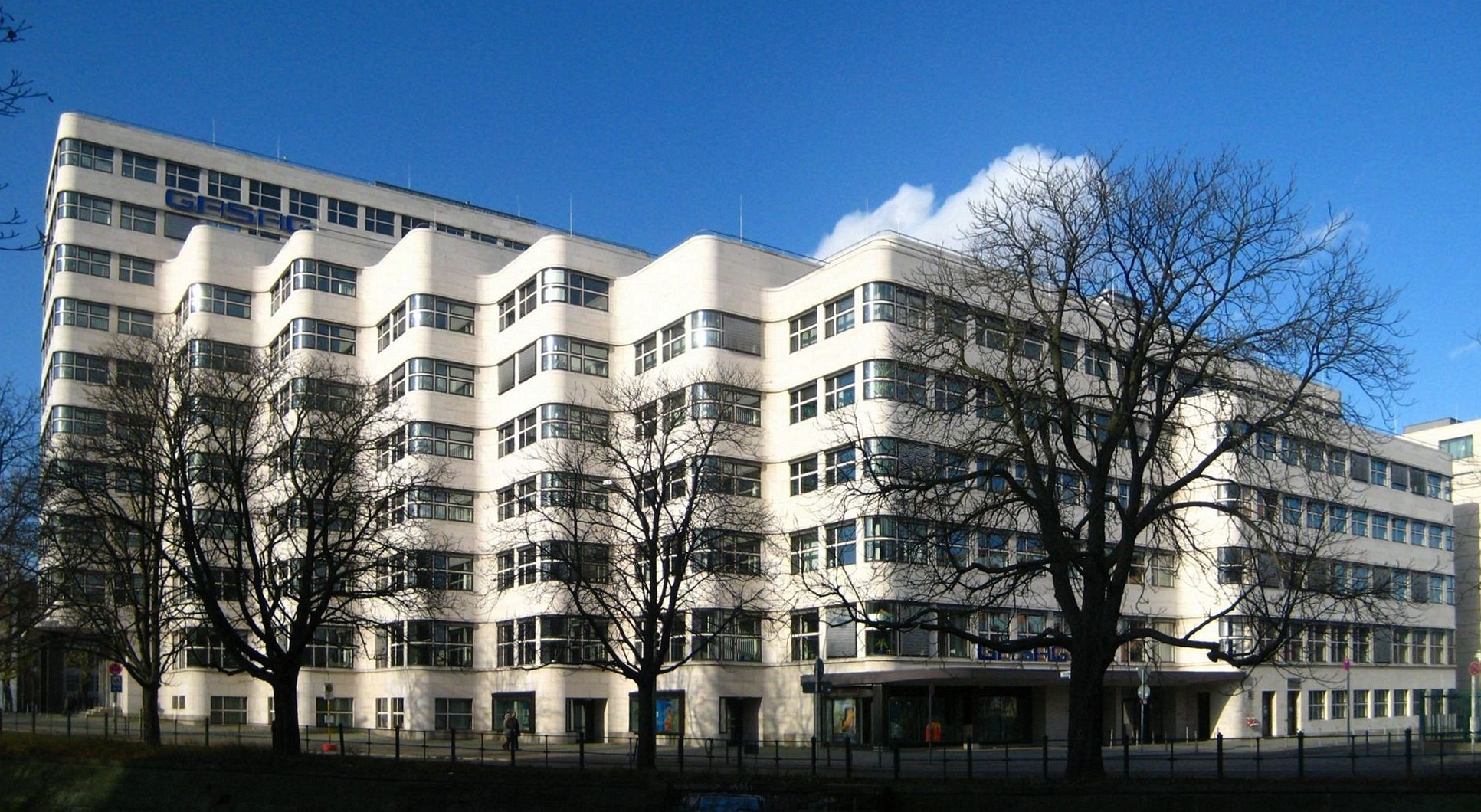
The design is similar to the Shell-Haus building in Berlin, Germany, built in 1931.

== Tenants ==
Tenants include:

- JPMorganChase (First Republic Bank)
- Lookout, Inc.
- Jones Lang LaSalle
- Cigna
- SF Travel Association
- Willkie Farr & Gallagher
- Airtable

== See also ==
- List of tallest buildings in San Francisco
