= Plasq =

plasq
- Type: Private
- Genre: Software
- Headquarters: United States
- Area served: Worldwide
- Website: plasq.com

plasq is an international software limited liability company comprising software developers and user interface designers from the United States, Australia, Switzerland, Norway and France. They primarily develop for Mac OS X and iOS; however, a Microsoft Windows version of Comic Life is available.

== History ==
Plasq is a worldwide limited liability company which began in Melbourne, Australia, but is now based in the United States; however, its employees are located in several countries. It was started by Cris Pearson and Keith Lang. The company is almost entirely internet based, as the employees are so far apart and must communicate via chat rooms. Additionally, all of their products are sold exclusively online, except for Comic Life, which can also be purchased in a boxed edition from Freeverse. The company originally focused on developing audio related software, although they have since released many other genres of software. In early 2010, Pearson and Lang left plasq to start Skitch, Inc, the company that currently develops the Skitch screenshot markup software.

== Products ==
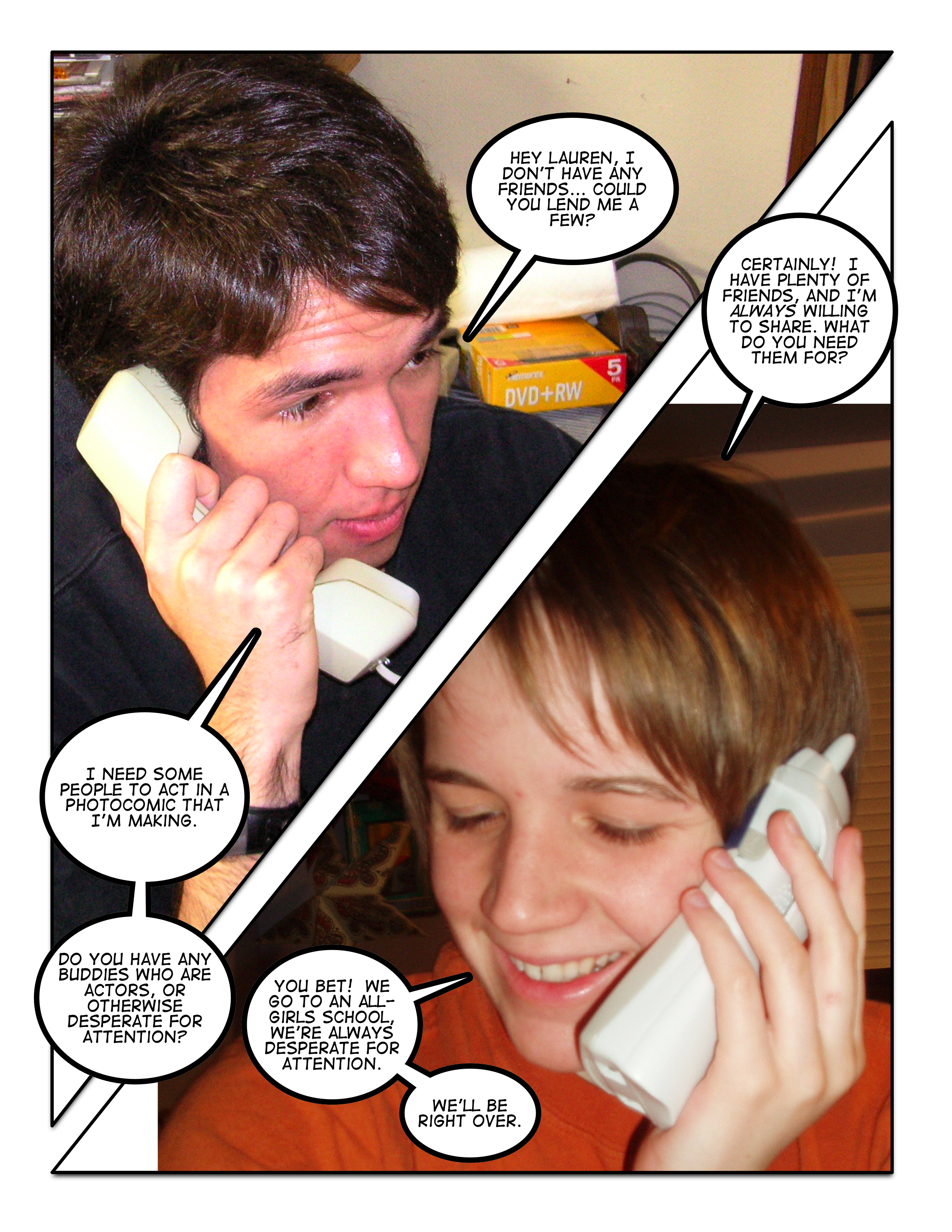
A page from a photocomic made with Comic Life

=== Comic Life ===
Comic Life is a software application which allows the creation of comics and similar documents. Comic files can be printed, exported, or uploaded to MobileMe. A "pro" version, called Comic Life Magiq, is also available.

==== Comic Touch ====
Comic Touch is an iOS app for altering images. Speech and thought bubbles, as well as captions and effects, can be added.

=== Doozla ===
Doozla is a children's drawing program for Mac OS X. It uses large icons and narrations in order to be easily accessible to children. Numerous modes are available which allow the user to draw on a blank canvas, illustrate several background images, or take an image from a webcam.

=== Skitch ===
Skitch is a screenshot editing and sharing utility for Mac OS X which was originally developed by plasq, but is currently run by the company Skitch, Inc. Skitch permits the user to add shapes and text to an image, and then share it online. Images can also be exported to various image formats. Skitch was acquired by Evernote on 18 August 2011. Evernote offers the app for free on both the iOS and Android markets. Also, there is a version of Skitch for Windows 8 Metro with general purpose of editing photos
