= Whistleblower (disambiguation) =

A whistleblower is a person who exposes misconduct occurring within an organization.

Whistleblower may also refer to:

- Whistle Blower (film), a 2014 Korean film
- Whistleblower (Irish TV series), a 2008 Irish television drama series
- Whistleblower (American TV program), a 2018 American true-crime television series
- "Whistleblower" (The Office), an episode of the American television series The Office
- The Whistleblower, a 2010 thriller film
- The Whistleblowers, a 2007 crime drama
- The Whistle Blower, a 1986 British spy thriller film
- Outlast: Whistleblower, downloadable content for the video game Outlast
- Whistleblower (album), a 2007 album by Finnish musician Vladislav Delay
