= Tummaa =

Studio album by Vladislav Delay
- Released: August 12, 2009
- Genre: Experimental, jazz
- Length: 66:01
- Label: The Leaf Label
- Producer: Vladislav Delay

Vladislav Delay chronology
Whistleblower (2007)	Tummaa (2009)	Vantaa (2011)

Tummaa is a studio album by Finnish producer Sasu Ripatti under the name Vladislav Delay. It was released in 2009.

It is unique among the Vladislav Delay solo discography for its use of live instrumentation provided by other musicians, namely Argentinian musician Lucio Capece on woodwinds and Scottish composer Craig Armstrong on keyboards.

The album's name means "dark" in Finnish and is a reference to kaamos, the Finnish polar night, during which time Delay recorded this album.

Tummaa is often cited as Ripatti's most jazz-oriented Vladislav Delay album.

== Critical reception ==
Professional ratings
Review scores
Source	Rating
AllMusic	4/5 stars
Drowned in Sound	7/10 stars
Pitchfork	6.2/10
Resident Advisor	4/5 stars

Tummaa has generally been well received by critics. Resident Advisor's Noah Barron gave it four stars out of five and called it "understated and affecting." Drowned In Sound's Noel Gardner gave it a score of 7 and called it "a persuasive advert for both electronic and experimental music in 2009." Pitchfork's Jess Harvell was more mixed, calling it "just fine as these low-impact, Delay-branded outings go" but criticizing it for its lack of similarity to Ripatti's work as Luomo.

== Track listing ==
1. "Melankolia" (Melancholia) (10:57)
2. "Kuula (Kiitos)" (Ball [Thanks]) (9:01)
3. "Mustelmia" (Bruising) (8:12)
4. "Musta Planeetta" (Black Planet) (5:10)
5. "Toive" (Wish) (11:08)
6. "Tummaa" (Dark) (10:18)
7. "Tunnelivisio" (Tunnel Vision) (11:15)
