= Phil Libin =

Russian entrepreneur

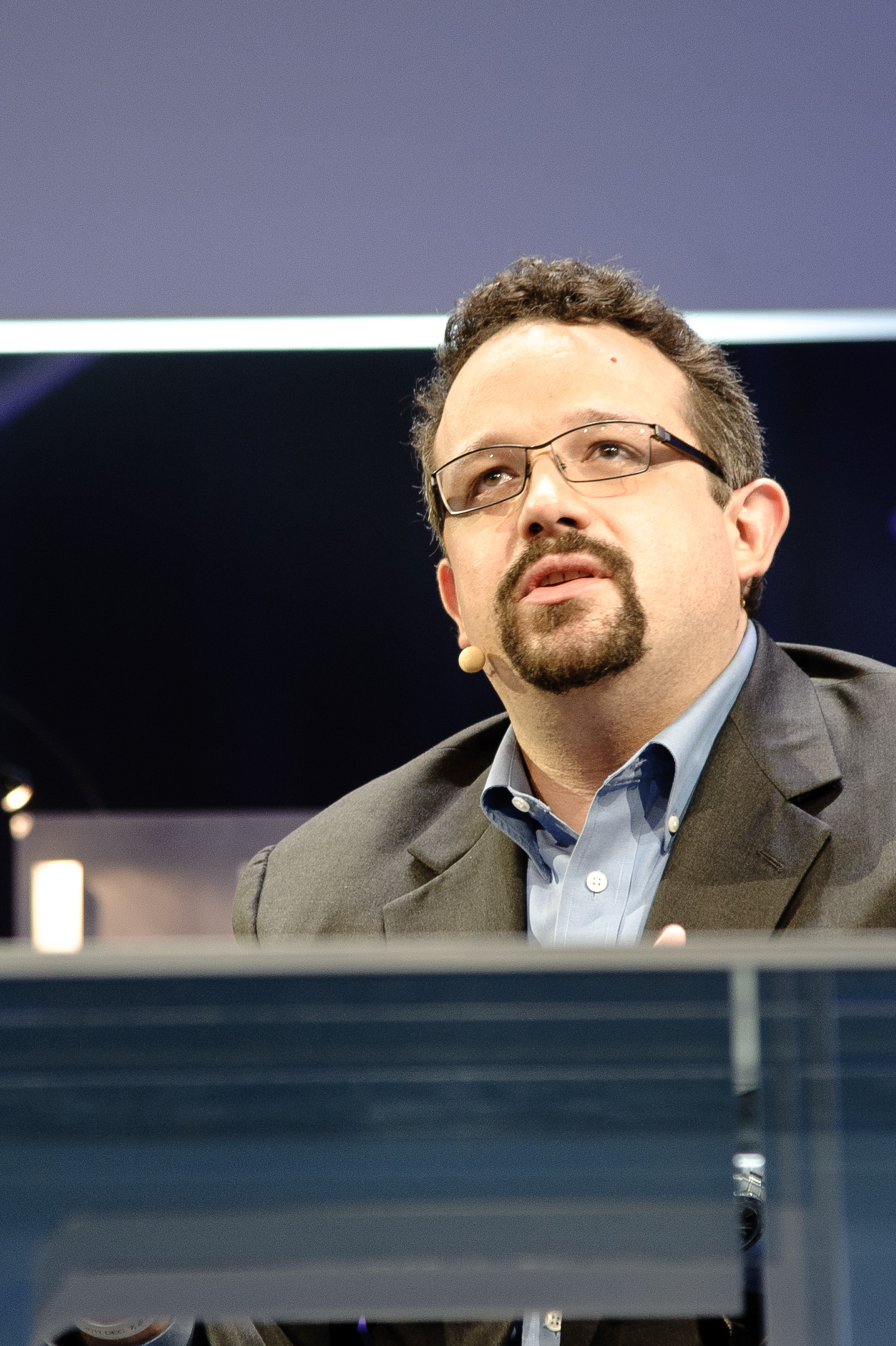
Phil Libin, Evernote CEO, at LeWeb

Phil Libin (Russian: Филлип Либин) was born February 1, 1972 in Leningrad, USSR and moved to America when he was eight years old. He was CEO of the Silicon Valley software company Evernote from 2007 to 2015, then became Executive Chairman of Evernote's board. In September 2015, Libin joined General Catalyst Partners as its fourth general partner in Silicon Valley. In September 2016, Libin stepped down as Executive Chairman of Evernote's board of directors to focus on his role at General Catalyst Partners.

Currently, Libin runs the Startup "mmhmm" and the startup studio All Turtles. Libin is a proponent of the benefits of hybrid and remote work and resides in Bentonville, Arkansas.

Before joining Evernote, Libin founded and was president of CoreStreet, a company that provided credential and identity management technologies to governments and large corporations. In 2009, CoreStreet was acquired by ActivIdentity, now owned by HID Global. Libin was also the founder and CEO of Engine 5, a Boston-based Internet software development company acquired by Vignette Corporation (VIGN) in 2000 for $26 million. Post-acquisition, Libin was principal architect and chief technologist for applications at Vignette.

Libin graduated from The Bronx High School of Science in 1989 and attended Boston University with a concentration in Computer Science, but left just before graduating to focus on his plans to launch a software company. In 2019, he returned to BU to finish his degree and now sits on the BU University Advisory Board.

Libin has a chapter advising Tim Ferriss' book Tools of Titans.
