= RingCentral =

American communications firm

RingCentral, Inc.
- Type: Public company
- Traded as: NYSE: RNG (Class A); Russell 1000 component; S&P 600 component
- Industry: Cloud computing communications
- Founded: 1999; 27 years ago
- Founders: Vlad Shmunis; Vlad Vendrow
- Headquarters: Belmont, California, U.S.
- Key people: Vlad Shmunis (Executive Chairman of the Board and CEO); Vaibhav Agarwal (CFO); John Marlow (CAO); Vlad Vendrow (CTO); Kira Makagon (President and COO)
- Products: RingCentral Contact Center; RingCX; AIR; RingEX
- Revenue: ▲US$2.5 billion (2025)
- Operating income: ▲US$121 million (2025)
- Net income: ▲US$−43.39 million (2025)
- Total assets: ▼US$1.48 billion (2025)
- Total equity: ▼US$−588 million (2025)
- Number of employees: 3,126 (August 2025)
- ASN: 40627
- Website: ringcentral.com

RingCentral, Inc. is an American provider of AI-powered cloud-based communication and collaboration products and services.

CEO Vlad Shmunis and CTO Vlad Vendrow founded the company in 1999. Investors included Doug Leone, Sequoia Capital, Khosla Ventures, Scale Venture Partners, and DAG Ventures. It completed its IPO in 2013.

== History ==
RingCentral was founded by Vlad Shmunis and Vlad Vendrow. The company originally operated as RingZero, focused on small business communications on Microsoft Windows.

RingCentral received its first round of venture capital investment in 2006. By 2011, it had secured $45 million in capital investment, with Cisco and Silicon Valley Bank among its investors. It completed its IPO on September 27, 2013, followed by a follow-on offering in March 2014 that raised an additional $39.8 million.

In 2018, RingCentral became a founding partner of the Chase Center as well as the exclusive cloud communications provider for the Golden State Warriors.

In February 2020, RingCentral and Avaya unveiled the Avaya Cloud Office application.

In April 2020, RingCentral launched RingCentral Video, a video-conferencing product that completed its Message Video Phone (MVP) solution. The RingCentral MVP app launched in May 2020.

In 2021, RingCentral entered an exclusive UCaaS partnership with Mitel, granting Mitel's users access to RingCentral's cloud communications platform. In December, the company introduced common integrations for MVP with enhanced data protections.

Mo Katibeh, formerly of AT&T, was appointed as president and COO in January 2022.

RingCentral began offering its MVP and Contact Center features to Amazon Web Services (AWS) in February 2023. That same year, it launched RingSense, an AI platform.

In April 2023, Vodafone Italy and RingCentral partnered to roll out Vodafone Business UC, followed by a similar rollout in Portugal in May 2023, combining RingCentral’s messaging and video tools with Vodafone’s fixed and mobile voice services. The next generation of RingCentral for Microsoft Teams 2.0 was announced in May 2023. The embedded app integrates RingCentral's cloud PBX, softphone dialer, SMS, and fax capabilities directly into the Microsoft Teams platform interface.

In June 2023, RingCentral became the first global cloud provider to offer fully compliant cloud phone system services in India.

On August 28, 2023, Tarek Robbiati was appointed CEO. In 2024, founder Vlad Shmunis returned to the CEO role.

RingCentral was included in Time’s “America’s Best Companies of 2026” list. On July 28th, 2026, RingCentral released a notice that it had been the target of an unauthorized “social engineering campaign” and began an investigation.

== Acquisitions ==
In June 2015, RingCentral acquired Glip, a persistent workstream collaboration platform that integrates team messaging, document sharing, task and event management, and other collaboration functionalities into the RingCentral platform. In October 2018, it acquired Dimelo, a Paris-based OmniChannel contact center provider.

In January 2019, the company acquired Connect First, a Boulder, Colorado-based outbound and blended customer engagement provider.

In December 2020, the company acquired DeepAffects, which specializes in intelligence-assisted speech recognition. In March 2021, it purchased Kindite, an encryption service provider.

RingCentral expanded its video communications portfolio by acquiring Hopin, an online audience engagement technology provider, in August 2023.

== Products ==
RingCentral's integrated platform ensures compatibility across its entire product line. For example, RingEX (UC) can be used with RingCentral's RingCX and Contact Center. It provides a cloud-based business phone system with PBX features, including: multiple extensions, call control, Outlook, Microsoft Teams, Salesforce, Google Docs, DropBox, and Box integration; SMS; video conferencing and web conferencing; fax; auto-receptionist; call logs; and rule-based call routing and answering. RingCentral also offers AI assistance tools, such as AIR and AI Virtual Assistant, across its unified communications and contact center platforms.

=== RingEX ===
RingEX is a unified UCaaS platform that integrates business phone, video conferencing, team messaging, SMS, and fax, along with AI-powered features. RingEX integrates directly with Microsoft Teams through RingCentral for Teams 2.0. Additionally, RingEX powers Vodafone Business UC, combining RingCentral’s messaging and video tools with Vodafone’s fixed and mobile voice services.

RingEX can be expanded to include essential CX capabilities through the Customer Engagement Bundle (CEB), a unified workspace that brings voice and SMS support together with real-time queue management and reporting.

=== AI Receptionist ===
AI Receptionist (AIR) is RingCentral’s generative AI-powered voice agent, launched in 2025. AIR automatically answers inbound calls and routes callers by context, triages inquiries using natural language, and sends SMS confirmations. It provides transcripts and analytics for each call, featuring customizable voice and multilingual support.

=== RingCX ===
Launched in 2023, RingCX is RingCentral’s CaaS platform that combines UC services (i.e. message, video, phone, SMS, fax) with a contact center solution powered by a generative AI feature set. AI Workforce Management, which provides predictive forecasting and scheduling, launched in November 2025 as part of the RingWEM suite.

=== AI Representative Pro ===
AI Representative Pro, a voice-first AI agent platform that automates customer interactions across SMS, chat and digital channels, was launched in March 2026. AIR Pro embeds directly into RingCentral’s existing communications and contact center ecosystem.

=== AI Conversation Expert ===
Formerly known as RingSense, AI Conversation Expert (ACE) is RingCentral’s conversation intelligence and analytics engine. ACE uses voice and natural language processing to extract business intelligence from interaction data by leveraging generative AI. The platform features a centralized insights dashboard that aggregates interaction data into six strategic modules to provide high-level visibility into customer trends and streamline workflows.
