= Komoot =

Mobile navigation app

- Operating system: Android, iOS
- Type: Navigation software
- License: Proprietary software
- Website: komoot.com

Komoot is a mobile app for navigation and route planning.

== History ==
Komoot was founded in 2010 and is based in Germany. The app was launched in 2013.

== Partnerships ==
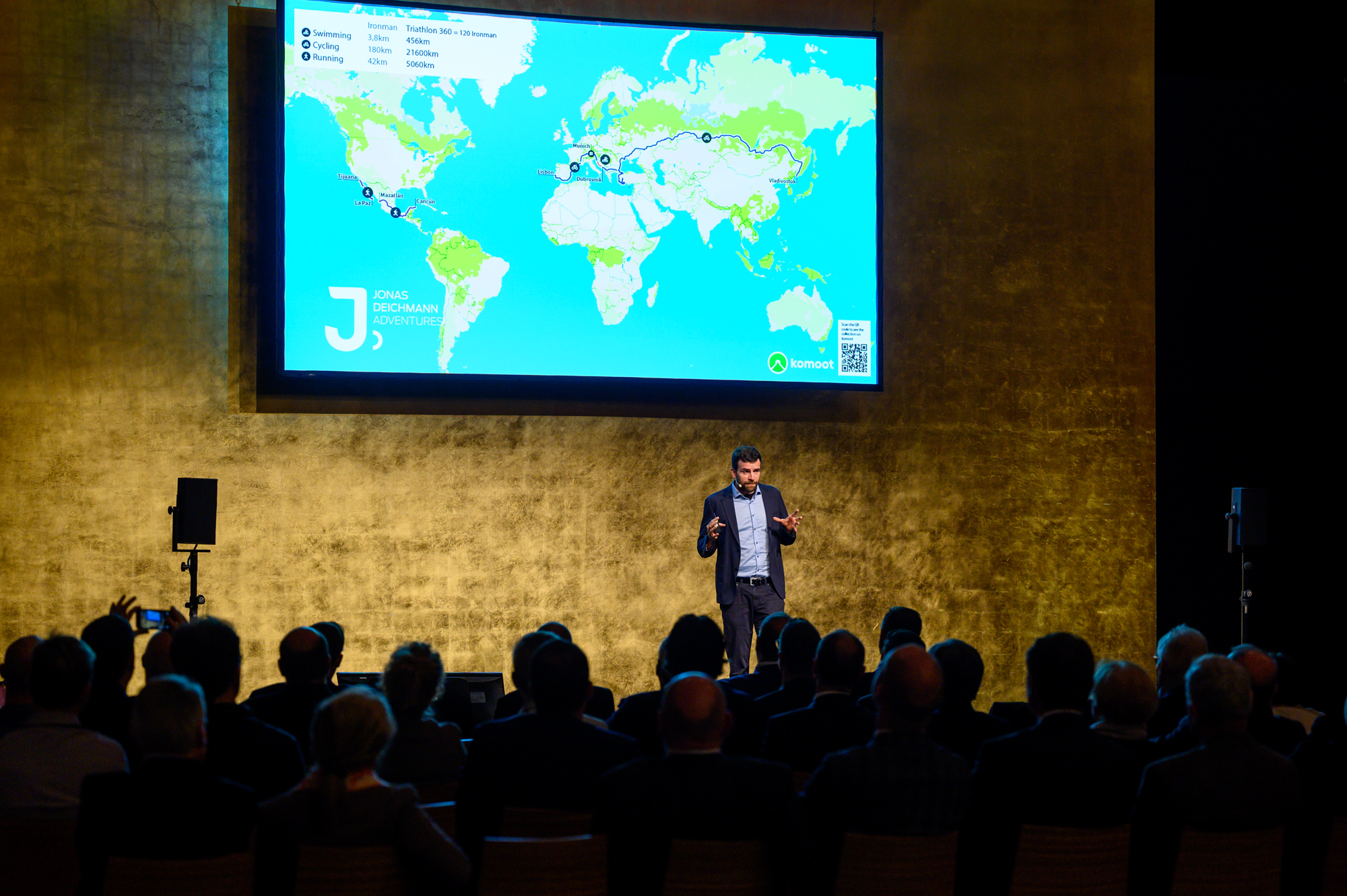
Komoot partner Jonas Deichmann giving a presentation at DZ Bank

Komoot partners with various sporting events including Transcontinental Race and Silk Road Race. It also sponsors various athletes, for example Lael Wilcox and Jonas Deichmann.

Komoot was acquired by Bending Spoons in March 2025. Roughly 85% of the staff was let go within the first two weeks of the acquisition.

== Features ==
The app has both free and paid-for features. It can create routes for various activities including walking, running, cycling, and mountain biking. It can report what percentage of a route consists of a given surface (roads, cycle tracks, gravel).

== Technology ==
The app uses OpenStreetMap.
