= Freestyle Capital =

Venture capital firm

- Type: Private
- Industry: Venture Capital
- Founded: 2009
- Founder: Dave Samuel; Josh Felser
- Headquarters: San Francisco, California, U.S.
- Key people: Dave Samuel, Co-Founder and General Partner; Jenny Lefcourt, General Partner
- Website: freestyle.vc

Freestyle Capital is an early-stage venture capital firm based in San Francisco, California. General Partners Dave Samuel and Jenny Lefcourt are both entrepreneurs who entered venture capital after founding multiple companies. The firm was founded in 2009 and typically invests in 10-12 companies per year with an average investment between $1.5 million to $3 million. Previous investments include Intercom, Patreon, Narvar, Digit, BetterUp, Airtable and Snapdocs.

== History ==
Freestyle was founded in 2009 by Dave Samuel and Josh Felser. Prior to Freestyle, Felser and Samuel founded two companies: Spinner, which they sold to AOL in 1999 for $320 million, and Grouper (later renamed Crackle), which they sold to Sony Corp. in 2006 for $65 million.

In 2011, Freestyle announced a formal fund of $27 million. Freestyle raised its second fund of $40 million in 2013 and their third fund of $60 million in 2015.

Jenny Lefcourt joined Freestyle toward the end of Fund II and became an equal partner at the close of Fund III. Notable investments from the first three funds include Intercom, Patreon, Narvar, Digit, Wag, BetterUp, Airtable and Snapdocs.

In 2017, Freestyle raised $90 million for its fourth fund.

According to the firm’s website, Josh Felser stepped down as full-time general partner in the summer of 2020 to focus his efforts on companies that foster a more resilient planet.

In March 2022, Freestyle closed its sixth fund at $130 million, making it the firm’s largest fund to date. The fund was raised in a month from existing investors.

== Partners ==
Dave Samuel earned his bachelor degree from MIT. In 1996, Samuel founded and was the CEO of Spinner, one of the first online radio services, which was acquired by AOL for $320 million in 1999. In 2004, he co-founded Crackle, one of the first internet video services, which was acquired by Sony Pictures Entertainment for $65 million in 2006. In addition to his work at Freestyle, Samuel is the founder and chairman of tech toilet seat company Brondell Inc.

Jenny Lefcourt earned her B.S. in economics from Wharton School of the University of Pennsylvania, and attended the Stanford Graduate School of Business. In 1998 she left Stanford to found WeddingChannel.com, which was acquired by The Knot, and Bella Pictures, which was acquired by CPI Corp (now defunct). In 2014, Lefcourt joined Freestyle and was promoted to general partner in 2015. She is also a founding member and board member of All Raise, and an angel investor in Discord, Minted and Main Street Hub.

== Notable Investments ==
As of March 2022, about 29% of current fund companies have a woman founder or co-founder.
