= Johnny Boufarhat =

Australian-born British entrepreneur and technology founder

- Born: 1 June 1994 (age 32); Sydney, Australia
- Education: Dubai American Academy
- Alma mater: University of Manchester
- Occupations: Entrepreneur, businessman
- Known for: Founder of Hopin

Johnny Boufarhat (born 1 June 1994) is an Australian-born British entrepreneur and businessman, best known for founding the virtual events platform Hopin in 2019. He came to prominence as one of the youngest self-made billionaires in the United Kingdom, reportedly achieving billionaire status at the age of 26.

== Early life ==
Boufarhat was born in Sydney, Australia, to a Lebanese father who is a mechanical engineer, and an Armenian mother, an accountant. His family relocated to Dubai, United Arab Emirates, where he attended the Dubai American Academy.

He later moved to the United Kingdom for his university studies, enrolling at the University of Manchester where he studied mechanical engineering and graduated in 2016. At university, he was described by peers as quiet and focused on his work.

== Career ==
=== Health challenges and founding vision ===
After graduation, Boufarhat suffered from a serious allergic reaction that led to an autoimmune disorder, leaving him largely housebound for several months. During this period, he developed the idea for Hopin—an online events platform enabling people to meet, collaborate, and network virtually.

=== Launch ===
In January 2019, Boufarhat officially launched Hopin. The company began as a small remote-first team and later set up its headquarters in London.

Although the platform experienced a surge in demand in 2020 during the COVID-19 pandemic, as companies, schools, and conferences shifted to virtual operations. The company reached a peak valuation of $7.75 billion in August 2021. According to the Financial Times, Boufarhat sold about $195 million worth of his shares in the company. By 2022, Hopin had more than 800 employees in over 45 countries.

=== Departure ===
As demand for in-person events returned post-pandemic, Hopin underwent strategic restructuring.

On 2 August 2023, Boufarhat stepped down as CEO of Hopin. He was succeeded by Josh Stein, the company's chief financial officer.

== Personal life ==
Boufarhat keeps a low public profile. He has spoken about following a carnivore diet, which he credits with helping manage his autoimmune condition. In 2021, Boufarhat resided in Barcelona. In 2022, Boufarhat became a resident of Switzerland. As of 2023, he splits his time between London and Barcelona.

Boufarhat has been recognised in the Forbes 30 Under 30 Europe list in the technology category in 2022. He appeared in the Sunday Times Rich List in 2022 and 2023. Boufarhat's estimated net worth in 2023 was £1.714 billion.
