= Brightcove =

American software company

Brightcove, Inc.
- Type: Subsidiary
- Traded as: Nasdaq: BCOV
- Industry: Internet video
- Founded: 2004; 22 years ago
- Founders: Jeremy Allaire; Bob Mason
- Headquarters: Boston, Massachusetts, United States
- Key people: Marc DeBevoise (CEO); Rob Noreck (CFO)
- Revenue: ▼US$201 million (2023)
- Number of employees: 670 (2023)
- Parent: Bending Spoons
- Website: brightcove.com

Brightcove, Inc. is an American software company that produces an online video platform. Founded in 2004 by Jeremy Allaire and Bob Mason, the company is based in Boston, Massachusetts and went public in 2012. In 2025, it was acquired by Bending Spoons.

== History ==
Brightcove was founded in 2004 by Jeremy Allaire, who served as executive chairman until April 2016, and Bob Mason. The company was named after Bright Cove Harbor in Cape Cod, Massachusetts, where one of the founders liked to kayak.

In March 2006, Brightcove acquired Seattle-based Metastories, makers of StoryMaker, a publishing tool for video, audio, images, and text. In May of that year, it established a distribution partnership with TiVo and a content delivery partnership with Limelight Networks.

Coinciding with a series of deals with UK media companies, Brightcove opened an office in London in July 2007.

In November 2009, Brightcove was named as one of the top two U.S. video platform vendors.

In August 2010, Brightcove announced a content delivery partnership with Akamai Technologies. Along with Akamai Technologies, its other partnerships include the ones with Sitecore, Cleeng, FreeWheel, YuMe, Conviva, Oracle, DoubleClick, and other organizations.

Brightcove went public in February 2012 with its stock priced at $11 per share.

In November 2014, Brightcove brought on its new chief financial officer Kevin R. Rhodes. He was later replaced by Robert Noreck, who had previously served as a Senior Vice President. Noreck assumed the role of executive vice president as well.

In July 2017, the company announced that CEO David Mendels agreed to step down at the end of the month. Andrew Feinberg, previously Brightcove's president and chief operating officer was named acting CEO until April 2018, Jeff Ray was then appointed as the new CEO.Ray was succeeded by Marc DeBevoise, former president of CBS Interactive and chief digital officer of ViacomCBS, in February 2022.DeBevoise was named president of OverDrive in March 2026.

Bending Spoons, an Italian technology company, agreed to acquire Brightcove for $233 million in November 2024. The acquisition was completed in February 2025.

=== Internet TV partnerships ===
In December 2005, Brightcove partnered with Reuters to create a program to syndicate customized news video players.

In 2006, Brightcove completed Internet TV partnership deals with a number of large media companies including, The New York Times (NYTimes.com and About.com), Discovery Communications (Discovery Channel, Travel Channel), and Sony BMG.

In 2007, Brightcove capitalized on a trend of magazine and newspaper publishers expanding into online video by signing deals with print media companies, including Time Inc., TV Guide, and Washingtonpost.Newsweek Interactive.

A number of television and cable media companies, such as Fox Entertainment Group, use Brightcove as an alternate, non-exclusive distribution channel for their video content.

== Products ==
Brightcove provides enterprise-level streaming and online video platform services, including hosting, distribution, and management.

In May 2026, Brightcove released Prism, redesigning their platform and adding live 4K streaming, digital rights management tools, and support for vertical video. In September, Brightcove launched Brightcove Gen 2, with a redesigned user interface, agentic AI functionality, and new localization and accessibility capabilities.

=== Former services ===
==== Brightcove Studio ====
The Brightcove Studio was home to the Brightcove Internet TV platform. Geared toward professional video publishers, the studio was used to create, customize, distribute, and monetize video player widgets. Videos, lineups, players, and online channels were all created and managed through a content management system called the Brightcove Console, an Adobe Flex-based internet application. Monetization was achieved through video sales and advertising.

==== Brightcove.tv ====
Brightcove.tv was a video website dedicated to promoting Brightcove content. On December 17, 2008, Brightcove shut down Brightcove Network accounts that had not been upgraded to paid Brightcove platform accounts. At the same time, they shut down the Brightcove.TV website (which is separate from the corporate Brightcove website).

==== App Cloud ====
In May 2011, Brightcove announced its App Cloud online product that was targeted at the development of mobile applications. App Cloud allows companies to develop apps once using its online interface, and then deploy them as iPhone and Android native apps.

App Cloud was made generally available in November 2011. NBC used App Cloud to power its NBCU Screen It Emmy screener app for the iPad. The app allows 15,000 members of the Academy of Television Arts & Sciences who vote on the Emmy awards to gain authenticated access to view NBC's programs. The App Cloud was terminated in early 2013.

== Awards ==
- Brightcove was awarded two Technology and Engineering Awards in 2021.
- In 2024, the company was named "Best Overall Video Marketing Company" in the MarTech Breakthrough Awards
