= Bending Spoons =

Italian technology company

Bending Spoons S.p.A.
- Type: Public
- Traded as: Nasdaq: BSP
- Industry: Software as a service
- Founded: 2013; 13 years ago in Copenhagen, Denmark
- Founders: Luca Ferrari; Francesco Patarnello; Matteo Danieli; Luca Querella; Tomasz Greber
- Headquarters: Milan, Italy
- Products: Airtable; AOL; Brightcove; Eventbrite; Evernote; Harvest; Issuu; Komoot; Meetup; Mosaic S.r.l; MileIQ; Miro; Netscape; Remini; Splice; StreamYard; Tractive; Vimeo; WeTransfer
- Revenue: ▲US$1.31 billion (2025); US$671 million (2024)
- Operating income: ▲US$278 million (2025); US$127 million (2024)
- Net income: ▼US$−0.2 million (2025); US$89 million (2024)
- Number of employees: ▲1,743 (2025); 712 (2024)
- Website: bendingspoons.com

Bending Spoons S.p.A. is an Italian technology conglomerate founded in 2013. Based in Milan, the company acquires products (such as Airtable, AOL, Eventbrite, and Vimeo) with existing product‑market fit and manages them for long-term ownership, often increasing revenue and lowering expenses (including by reducing headcount). The company employs full-stack developers to rewrite acquired codebases using artificial intelligence, proprietary tools, and open-source software (often Python, FastAPI, and TypeScript). On July 1, 2026, the company became public via an initial public offering on the Nasdaq in the United States.

== History ==
Luca Ferrari, Francesco Patarnello, and Matteo Danieli worked on an unsuccessful venture-funded product startup called Evertale. They were left with $40,000, which became the seed capital for Bending Spoons in June 2013, also founded in Copenhagen. The company name was inspired by a scene from the science fiction movie The Matrix. The company moved to Milan in 2014.

On 17 April 2020, the Italian government released a statement on its website announcing that Bending Spoons had been selected to design and develop Italy's official COVID-19 contact tracing app, Immuni. The app was released on 1 June 2020. Immuni was later decommissioned on December 31, 2022.

In 2025, the company received 800,000 job applications and made 286 hires.

In April 2026, it was revealed that Bending Spoons had picked banks to organize a potential $20 billion U.S. initial public offering in 2026. On June 8, the company filed a Form F-1 with the SEC to list on Nasdaq's Global Select Market under the ticker symbol BSP, targeting a valuation of approximately $20 billion and seeking to raise $1.5 billion. The filing disclosed revenue of $1.31 billion for full-year 2025 and $601 million for the first quarter of 2026, compared with $259 million in the same period a year earlier. Bending Spoons' shares opened for trading on July 1. The company raised $1.68 billion, pricing shares at $29.00. During its first day of trading, the stock surged nearly 40% to close at $40.50 per share. The listing follows a growth strategy focused on acquiring and restructuring over 50 legacy digital brands, including AOL, Evernote and WeTransfer.

In October 2026, Berkshire Hathaway invested an additional $330 million into Bending Spoons.

== Acquisitions ==
Bending Spoons' earliest acquisitions include video editing application Splice, which it acquired from GoPro in 2018, and AI-powered photo editing platform Remini in 2021.

In September 2022, Bending Spoons acquired FiLMiC and converted its video-recording app FiLMiC Pro to a subscription revenue model. In December 2023, the original FiLMiC team were laid off, and development of FiLMiC Pro was continued in-house by Bending Spoons.

In November 2022, Bending Spoons agreed to acquire Evernote. The acquisition was concluded in January 2023. In July 2023, Evernote laid off all of its existing staff and announced it would relocate to Europe to be closer to Bending Spoons' headquarters. Also in 2023, the company acquired Alight Creative, creators of video editing software Alight Motion.

Bending Spoons made a series of acquisitions in 2024. In January, it acquired the assets of New York City-based mobile app developer Mosaic Group from IAC Inc.; subsequently, Mosaic's entire workforce of 330 staff members was laid off, as they were not part of the acquisition. Also that month, Bending Spoons acquired Meetup, a social media platform for organizing in-person and virtual activities. In April, the company announced that it would acquire Hopin, owner of the popular live streaming studio StreamYard. Later in July, the company announced it had acquired digital publishing platform Issuu. Also in July, the company agreed to acquire the Dutch file transfer service WeTransfer, then announced in September they were laying off 75% of the company's workforce. In November, the company agreed to acquire video platform company Brightcove for $233 million. In March, Brightcove laid off 33% of employees.

In 2025, Bending Spoons acquired several companies, including Komoot in March for near €300 million, soon after which it laid off three quarters of the staff. The company also acquired professional services software provider Harvest in June, California-based MileIQ for $233 million in July, video sharing platform Vimeo in September for $1.38 billion, and AOL in October for $1.5 billion. In December, the acquisition of Eventbrite for approximately $500 million was announced, which closed on March 10, 2026. The following month, Vimeo laid off most of their staff, including the entire video team. AOL later laid off more than 100 employees in February 2026. In April, Bending Spoons expanded its portfolio into the IoT and pet-tech sector by acquiring Tractive, an Austrian company specialized in GPS tracking and health monitoring for pets. The acquisition closed in May 2026. In August 2026, Bending Spoons acquired cloud collaboration service Airtable for $1.285 billion, marking their first purchase since going public a month prior. In September 2026, it agreed to acquire collaboration platform Miro for $1.36 billion. In November 2026, it agreed to acquire Mailchimp from Intuit for $3.68 billion.

=== Acquisition history ===
Date	Company	Products	Purpose	Country	Value (USD)	Adjusted (USD)	References
2018	Vemory Inc./Path 36 LLC (Note: Acquired from GoPro)	Splice App	Mobile video editing	United States	—	—	
June 2021	BigWinePot Inc.	Remini	Mobile photo editing	China	—	—	
September 2, 2022	FiLMiC Inc.	Filmic Pro	Mobile video capture and editing	United States	—	—	
September 2, 2022	FiLMiC Inc.	DoubleTake	Mobile video capture and editing	United States	—	—	
September 2, 2022	FiLMiC Inc.	Filmic Firstlight	Mobile photo capture and editing	United States	—	—	
2023	Alight Creative Inc.	Alight Motion	Mobile video motion design	Republic of Korea	—	—	
January 3, 2023	Evernote Corporation	Evernote	Note-taking and task-management	United States	200,000,000	211,000,000	
May 30, 2023	Humamy S.r.l.		Vegetarian meal home delivery	Italy	—	—	
January 10, 2024	Mosaic Group/Apalon (Note: Acquired from IAC/InterActiveCorp)	Clime	Weather forecasting	United States	100,000,000	103,000,000	
January 10, 2024	Mosaic Group/Apalon	iTranslate	Translation, language learning	United States	100,000,000	103,000,000	
January 10, 2024	Mosaic Group/Apalon	Robokiller	Spam call filtering	United States	100,000,000	103,000,000	
January 11, 2024	Meetup		Social networking	United States	—	—	
April 9, 2024	Hopin	StreamYard	Live streaming studio	United Kingdom	—	—	
July 19, 2024	Issuu		Electronic publishing	Denmark	—	—	
July 31, 2024	WeTransfer		File transferring	Netherlands	—	—	
January 10, 2025	Loomly		Social media management	United States	—	—	
February 4, 2025	Brightcove		Video hosting	United States	223,000,000	223,000,000	
March 20, 2025	Komoot		Navigation	Germany	—	—	
June 10, 2025	Iridesco LLC	Harvest	Time tracking software	United States	—	—	
July 8, 2025	MileIQ		Mileage tracking	United States	223,000,000	223,000,000	
November 24, 2025	Vimeo		Video hosting	United States	1,380,000,000	1.380×10^{9}	
January 2026	AOL (Note: Acquired from Yahoo Inc.)		Email services	United States	1,400,000,000	1.400×10^{9}	
March 10, 2026	Eventbrite		Ticket marketplace	United States	500,000,000	500,000,000	
May 18, 2026	Tractive		Pet monitoring	Austria	900,000,000	900,000,000	
September 4, 2026	Formagrid Inc.	Airtable	Cloud collaboration service	United States	1,285,000,000	1.285×10^{9}	
Planned	Miro		Cloud collaboration platform	United States	1,360,000,000	1.360×10^{9}	
Planned	Mailchimp		Email marketing platform	United States	3,680,000,000		

== Business model and reception ==
Bending Spoons' strategy has been likened to private equity: it acquires established, subscription-based software products and seeks to raise their profitability through a combination of technology, artificial intelligence, price increases and staff reductions. Unlike a typical private equity firm, it retains the brands it acquires rather than reselling them.

The company's post-acquisition changes have drawn criticism from customers and commentators, particularly over price increases. Following its 2025 acquisition of the time-tracking and invoicing service Harvest, Bending Spoons restructured the product's pricing from a flat per-seat model to a base rate supplemented by usage-based fees, resulting in sharply higher renewal costs for some long-standing customers (in some cases up to 1500% more). In August 2026, Bloomberg News reported that one freelance customer's annual subscription was set to rise roughly twelvefold at renewal, from around $211 to more than $2,500.

Co-founder and chief product officer Matteo Danieli attributed part of the scrutiny to the fact that several acquired products, such as Evernote, had devoted user bases before acquisition, and said that customer retention across the portfolio had remained "remarkably stable" despite the changes.

== Playond ==
Logo of the defunct Playond mobile gaming subscription service.

In 2019, Bending Spoons launched a mobile gaming subscription titled Playond. The service provided subscribers access to a catalog of premium iOS games, competing with similar platforms like Apple Arcade or GameClub. Some criticised the service for re-releasing games which previously used a one-off payment model under a subscription, sometimes resetting user progress or locking the user out of games they had previously bought after the licensing rights had been moved to Bending Spoons. Notable titles at launch included Crashlands, Morphite, Sleep Attack, Daggerhood, and Jydge. All games also allowed for limited free play with an 'energy' system, to entice new users to subscribe.

In March 2020, Bending Spoons announced the closure of the Playond service with the titles in their library being returned to the App Store pages of their original developers. As a result of the closure, many games briefly became free-to-play as a result of the service's authentication servers being shut down.

== See also ==
- Mergers and acquisitions
