= Whistleblower (album) =

Studio album by Vladislav Delay
- Released: January 4, 2007
- Genre: Experimental; ambient
- Length: 68:51
- Label: Huume Recordings
- Producer: Vladislav Delay

Vladislav Delay chronology
The Four Quarters (2005)	Whistleblower (2007)	Tummaa (2009)

Whistleblower is a studio album by Finnish producer Sasu Ripatti under the name Vladislav Delay. It was released in 2007 on Ripatti's own Huume Recordings.

== Critical reception ==
Professional ratings
Review scores
Source	Rating
Pitchfork	7.1/10
PopMatters	3/5 stars
Resident Advisor	4.5/5 stars

Whistleblower has been generally well received by critics. Peter Chambers of Resident Advisor gave an extremely positive review, awarding the album four and a half stars out of five and saying, "Every time Ripatti makes an album he seems to be remaking music itself, re-defining what is possible to sound out through timbre, rhythm, melody."

Other reviews were more mixed. Andy Battaglia of Pitchfork Media gave the album 7.1 out of 10, but criticized its lack of similarity to Ripatti's more house-oriented work as Luomo, calling the album a "tease" and saying "the Luomo aura helps as much as it hurts, mostly by making Delay's dubby hesitations and ambient lack of pacing resonate all the more for the decisions they imply." Nate Dorr of PopMatters awarded it 6 out of 10 and calling it "above all an exercise in atmosphere."

== Track listing ==
1. "Whistleblower" (9:44)
2. "Wanted To (Kill)" (12:44)
3. "Stop Talking" (9:12)
4. "I Saw A Polysexual" (9:19)
5. "Lumi" (5:23)
6. "He Lived Deeply" (12:54)
7. "Recovery Idea" (10:00)
