= Hopin (company) =

Software company

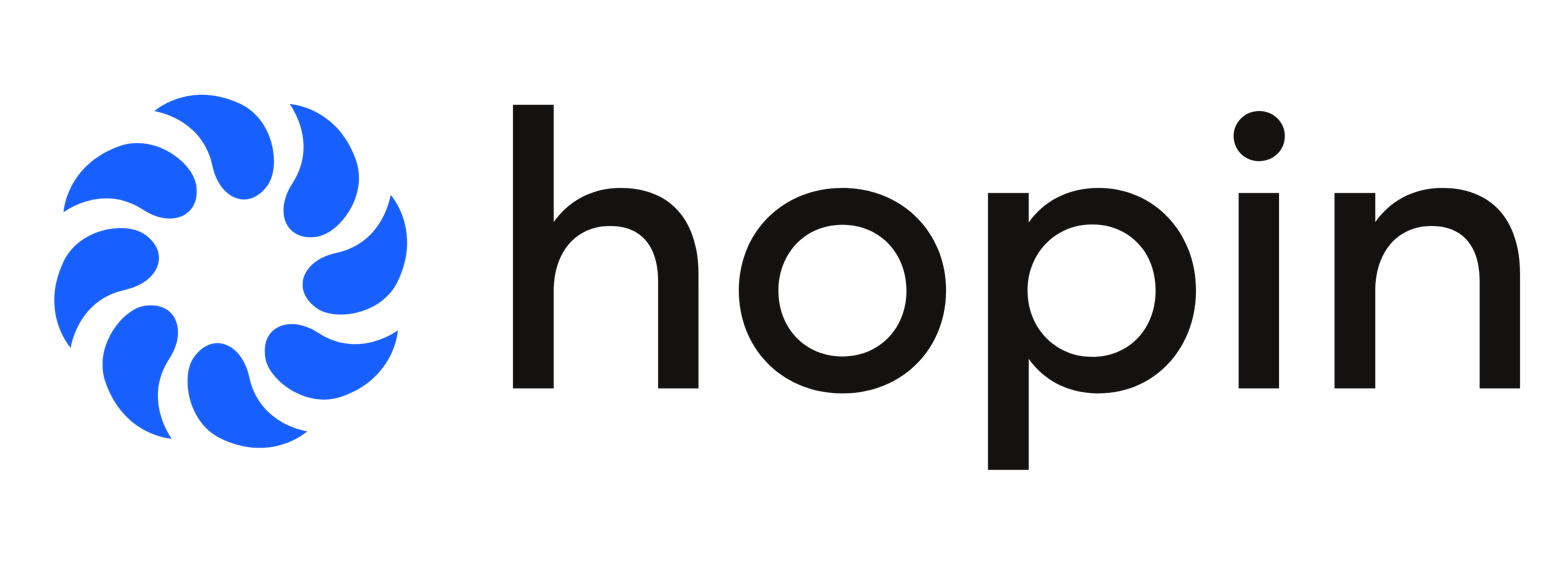
- Industry: Videoconferencing, VoIP, and Instant messaging
- Founded: January 10, 2020; 6 years ago
- Founder: Johnny Boufarhat
- Defunct: 2024
- Fate: Acquired by Bending Spoons
- Successor: Bending Spoons; RingCentral
- Website: hopin.com

Hopin was a technology company of British origin. It developed a proprietary video teleconferencing online event-hosting platform. It was a fully-remote company without an office address.

== History ==
Hopin was founded in 2020 by Johnny Boufarhat. Its platform allowed meeting participants for conference attending and networking online, exchange virtual business cards, and get a summary of their connections after an event. It become increasingly popular in the wake of the COVID-19 pandemic.

Hopin raised over $1 billion in funding from various investors, including Accel, IVP, Coatue Management, Northzone, Salesforce Ventures, and others. Its peak valuation was $7.8 billion in August 2021.

The company made several rounds of layoffs in 2022 as demand for online events shrank and in-person events resumed.

In August 2023, following a share buyback for shareholders of over $500M+, the company sold its events unit assets—including its technology, customers and engineering and product teams—to RingCentral for $15–50 million. Boufarat stepped down as CEO. The company continued to operate its live-streaming and video hosting products Streamyard and Streamable. The company's valuation was approximately $400 million.

In February 2024, Hopin moved its headquarters to the United States and closed its UK Corporate entity. Hopin was acquired by Bending Spoons in April 2024.

== See also ==
- Impact of the COVID-19 pandemic on science and technology
- List of video telecommunication services and product brands
