= Stepan Pachikov =

American businessman

- Степан Александрович Пачиков
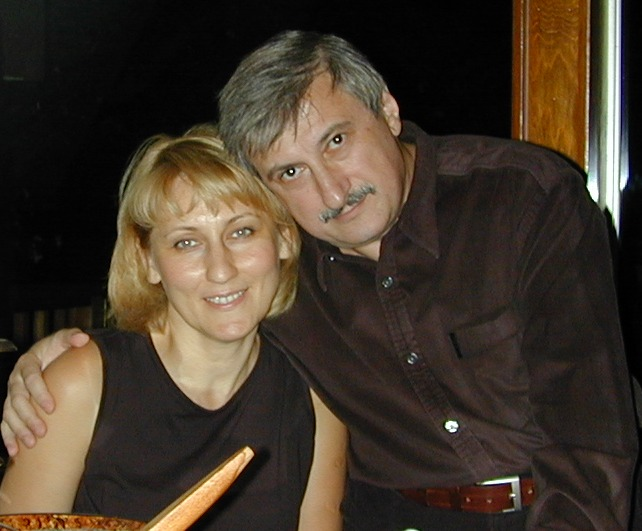
- Born: Stepan Alexandrovich Pachikov; February 1, 1950 (age 76); Vartashen District, Azerbaijan SSR
- Education: Academy of Sciences of the Soviet Union (PhD)
- Occupations: Businessman; Entrepreneur; Software engineer
- Known for: Founder of Evernote

Stepan Alexandrovich Pachikov (Russian: Степан Александрович Пачиков; born February 1, 1950) is the co-founder of ParaGraph Intl., Parascript, Evernote, among other software companies that contributed heavily to the development of Handwriting recognition and VRML technologies.

== Background and education ==
Pachikov was born in Vartashen District (now Oğuz), in Azerbaijan SSR the son of Alexander Stepanovich Pachikov and Ekaterina Pankova. Pachikov has Udi, Ukrainian and Russian ancestry. The word 'pachikov' in the Udi language means "the son of two branches".

He attended Novosibirsk State University, Tbilisi State University (Georgia) and Moscow State University where he received an honorary master's degree in economic applications of mathematical methods. He received his PhD in fuzzy logic from the USSR Academy of Sciences.

== Career ==
In 1989–1997, he worked in Moscow at ParaGraph International, a Soviet-American joint venture that dealt with handwriting recognition software for the Apple Newton. In 1992 he opened the US branch of ParaGraph in Silicon Valley, where he created and distributed software called Calligrapher for handwritten input on tablets and touchscreens. From 1997 to 1998, he served as vice president and established a Pen & Internet division of Silicon Graphics.

Pachikov is a co-founder and board-member of Parascript, which was spun off from ParaGraph in 1996. It provides optical character recognition (OCR) and handwriting recognition to Lockheed Martin, which packages processing machines for the US Postal Service. It also provides most of the automated signature verification for absentee ballot processing in US elections. In 2008, he founded and became chief architect of the application, services, and vision behind the Evernote line of services. Since 1986, he has been President of the Moscow Computer Children Club, supported at the time by world chess champion Garry Kasparov, where children are taught computer programming, web design, etc.

By 2004 he was a US citizen.
