= Whistle (company) =

American pet device company

- Type: Private
- Industry: Pet devices
- Founded: 2012; 14 years ago
- Founders: Ben Jacobs (CEO); Kevin Lloyd (CTO); Steven Eidelman (COO)
- Headquarters: San Francisco, California, U.S.
- Key people: Ben Jacobs, CEO
- Products: Whistle Dog Tracker (GPS device)
- Parent: Mars Petcare
- Website: Official website

Whistle Labs, Inc. was a pet-technology company headquartered in San Francisco, California. It produced and marketed the Whistle GPS Pet Tracker, a device worn on a pet's collar to monitor activity and location. In addition to serving pet owners, the devices have been used by veterinary researchers for canine health and behavior studies.

Whistle was acquired by Mars Petcare in 2016 and operated under Mars until 2025, when Tractive acquired Whistle. After this acquisition, the Whistle brand and product line were discontinued and Whistle customers were given the option to transition into Tractive's platform.

== History ==
The idea for Whistle grew out of their first CEO Ben Jacobs' experiences on pet-care accounts at Bain & Company, and was developed with COO Steve Eidelman while researching the pet-care industry for venture capital firm DCM. They hired Kevin Lloyd as CTO and the three founded Whistle in 2012. The company started with 20 employees and raised $6 million in a venture funding round led by DCM. Other investors included the former CEO of Mars Petcare and the President of Humane Society Silicon Valley.

Whistle's first product, an activity monitor for dogs that tracked their exercise, was released in 2013. The company raised an additional $10 million in a Series A funding round and $15 million in Series B. A February 2014 agreement with PetSmart placed the Whistle device in all the company's stores and led to co-marketing efforts. Whistle also began working with veterinary schools to analyze the data collected from the app. For example, in 2014 the Pennsylvania School of Veterinary Medicine at the University of Pennsylvania used data from Whistle devices for their research on chronic pain conditions in dogs; and researchers at the College of Veterinary Medicine at North Carolina State University have used it to study epilepsy in dogs. The company also has an advisory panel of veterinarians.

Whistle began experimenting with the SigFox internet of things network for its devices in May 2014. In January 2015, the company acquired Tagg, a competing startup based in San Diego, for an undisclosed sum for its battery life and location-tracking intellectual property, and Tagg's CEO, Scott Neuberger, joined Whistle. Tagg had started as a Qualcomm subsidiary in 2010 and released its tracking device one year before Whistle. By 2015, Whistle had distributed 100,000 devices and had about 40 employees.

In April 2016, Whistle was acquired by Mars Petcare, the pet product subsidiary of the food and candy bar maker Mars, for $117 million.

== Acquisition by Tractive and transition ==
In 2025, Tractive — an international pet-tracking and health monitoring company headquartered in Austria — acquired Whistle from Mars Petcare. Following the acquisition, Whistle's product line was discontinued, and customers were offered transition options to Tractive's platform.

== Products ==
Whistle produced and marketed wearable monitoring devices for pets. The Whistle Activity Monitor, which was sometimes called a "Fitbit for dogs", tracked the duration, time, and intensity of a pet's exercise, providing the data to users over Wi-Fi networks or to a phone app using Bluetooth. The GPS pet tracker is for finding lost pets. It also produced an alert if the pet's behavior changes, for example a reduction in sleep, indicating anxiety.

The GPS and location tracking product was announced in May 2014. An integration with Jawbone Up that May allowed Jawbone users to compare their exercise to their dog's in the same app. In February 2017, Whistle 3 was introduced. It was half the size of prior models and intended for smaller dogs or cats.

Whistle started with a model called Whistle 3. They released Whistle GO in 2019. Whistle GO was an earlier version of the Whistle brand but was an improvement of the Whistle 3. Its main features were GPS location tracking, and health and fitness monitoring. Whistle GO had an improved battery life and provided more health information than its previous model.
