= Airtable =

Cloud collaboration service

- Former name: Formagrid Inc.
- Website type: Collaborative software
- Founded: 2012; 14 years ago
- Headquarters: One Front Street; San Francisco, California, U.S.
- Owner: Bending Spoons
- Founders: Howie Liu; Andrew Ofstad; Emmett Nicholas
- Industry: Internet
- Website: airtable.com
- Registration: Required
- Current status: Active

Airtable is an American cloud collaboration service company headquartered in San Francisco. It was founded in 2012 by Howie Liu, Andrew Ofstad, and Emmett Nicholas. It provides spreadsheet, database, and AI agent services.

== History ==
Airtable was founded in 2013 by Howie Liu, Andrew Ofstad, and Emmett Nicholas.

In February 2015, Airtable raised $3 million from Caffeinated Capital, Freestyle Capital, Data Collective, and CrunchFund. In May 2015, the company secured an additional $7.6 million in funding from Charles River Ventures and Ashton Kutcher.

In March 2018, Airtable raised $52 million in Series B funding, followed by the announcement of the launch of Airtable Blocks. In November 2018 it raised $100 million in Series C funding.

In September 2020, Airtable raised $185 million in Series D funding. This was followed by a Series E funding round in March 2021, where Airtable secured $270 million, led by Greenoaks with participation from WndrCo, Caffeinated Capital, CRV, and Thrive.

The company's growth culminated in December 2021 when Airtable raised $735 million in a Series F funding round, boosting its valuation to $11 billion.

In December 2022, the company laid off 254 employees, which was one-fifth of the company's workforce. Three executives also left at this time.

In September 2023, Airtable laid off an additional 237 of its employees.

In October 2025, Airtable acquired DeepSky (formerly Gradient), an AI research and analysis startup that had raised approximately $40 million in venture funding. Concurrently, the company hired David Azose, previously at OpenAI, as its new chief technology officer.

In January 2026, Airtable launched Hyperagent, originally known as Superagent, as a standalone product. The system, based on DeepSky technology, coordinates specialized AI agents working in parallel to perform research and analysis tasks.

In August 2026, Bending Spoons announced an acquisition of Airtable for $1.3 billion. This was followed by an announcement of the mass-layoff of "a large portion" of the company.

== Products ==
Airtable is a spreadsheet-database hybrid, with the features of a database but applied to a spreadsheet. The fields in an Airtable table are similar to cells in a spreadsheet, but have types such as 'checkbox', 'phone number', and 'drop-down list', and can reference file attachments like images.

Users can create a database, set up column types, add records, link tables to one another, collaborate, sort records and publish views to external websites. Users cannot download their database in full, but can download some of the data by manually downloading CSVs for each table.

=== Updates ===
- April 2015: Airtable launches its API and embedded databases.
- July 2015: Introduced Airtable Forms to collect and organize data.
- August 2015: Airtable made "Add to Slack" option available to integrate Airtable with Slack.
- December 2015: Airtable redesigned its iOS app.
- December 2015: Airtable introduced barcode as new field type.
- June 2023: Airtable launched a beta program and expanded access to Airtable AI.
- June 2025: Airtable relaunched as an AI-native app.
- January 2026: Airtable launched Superagent, an AI agent.

== See also ==
- Cloud collaboration
- Document collaboration
- Collaborative software
- Collaborative real-time editor
