= Tractive =

Austrian technology company

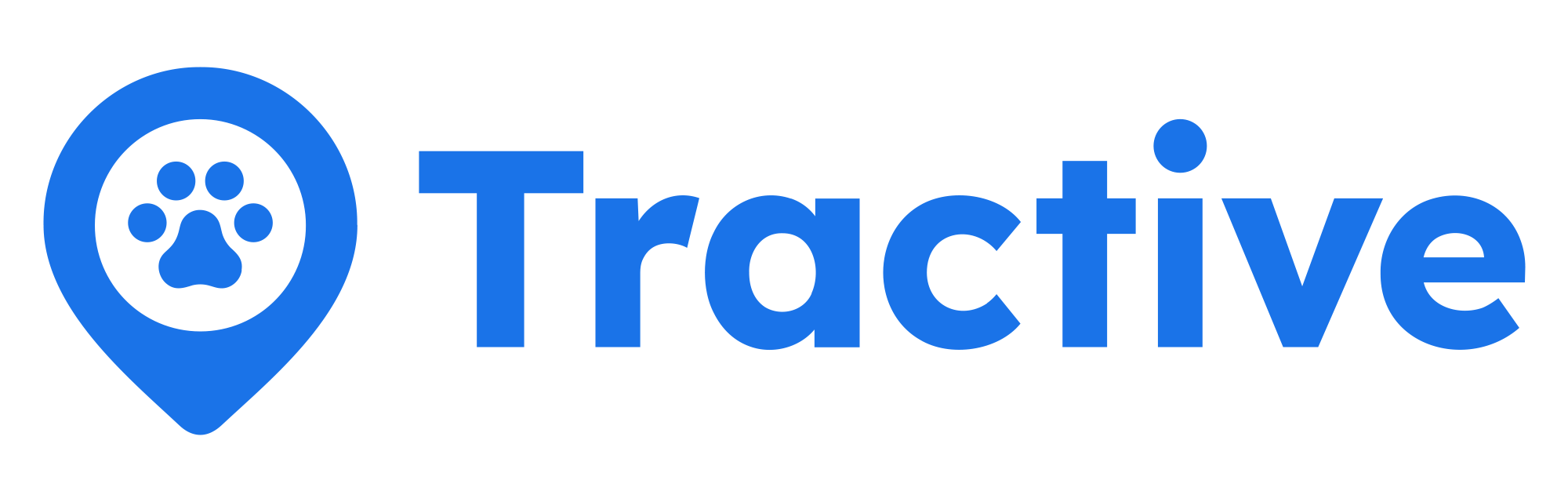
- Type: Private
- Industry: Software Technology, Hardware
- Founded: 2012
- Founders: Michael Hurnaus; Michael Lettner; Michael Tschernuth
- Headquarters: Pasching, Austria
- Key people: Michael Hurnaus (Former CEO); Wolfgang Reisinger (Former COO); Andrew Bleiman (Former EVP, North America); Dominik Hurnaus (CTO); Martin Theißen (CMO)
- Number of employees: < 140 (2026); 300 (2025)
- Parent: Bending Spoons
- Website: www.tractive.com

Tractive is an Austrian technology company specializing in GPS tracking and health monitoring devices for dogs and cats. Founded in 2012, the company offers products that enable pet owners to monitor their animals' real-time location, activity levels, and health metrics through a collar-attached device and dedicated mobile application.

== History ==
Tractive was established in October 2012 by Michael Hurnaus, Michael Lettner, Michael Tschernuth and the founders of Adidas Runtastic, including Florian Gschwandtner, in Pasching, Austria. The company's initial focus was on developing GPS tracking devices for dogs and cats. In 2013, Tractive unveiled its first GPS tracker prototype at the Consumer Electronics Show (CES) in Las Vegas. By 2014, the first-generation tracking devices were released, earning the "Innovation of the Year" award at the Austrian Futurezone Awards.

In 2020, Tractive expanded its operations to North America by opening an office in Seattle, Washington, under the subsidiary Tractive Inc. The Seattle office focuses on marketing, partnerships, and operations. In 2023, the company further expanded its European presence by establishing Tractive Deutschland GmbH in Düsseldorf, Germany.

In 2024, Tractive surpassed €100 million in annual recurring revenue (ARR). In August 2025, Tractive acquired the U.S.-based pet technology company Whistle, known for its GPS and health tracking devices for pets.

In early 2025, Tractive introduced additional health tracking features, including resting heart rate, respiratory rate, and barking, to its existing activity and sleep monitoring.

In March 2026, Tractive announced that they have entered an agreement to be acquired by Italian conglomerate Bending Spoons. The acquisition was completed in May 2026. Immediately following the acquisition, around 50% of Tractive employees were made redundant. Founder and CEO Michael Hurnaus and COO Wolfgang Reisinger resigned shortly after the acquisition deal closed.

== Products and features ==
=== GPS tracking ===
Tractive's GPS trackers utilize LTE-M, Bluetooth, and Wi-Fi to provide real-time location tracking of pets. Users can monitor their pets' locations via a mobile application available for iOS and Android, or through a web interface. The devices support the creation of virtual fences (geofences), alerting owners when a pet leaves a designated safe area.

=== Health monitoring ===
In 2025, Tractive introduced advanced health monitoring features, including resting heart rate and respiratory rate tracking. These metrics are analyzed against individual baselines and comparative data from similar pets to detect potential health issues early. The devices also monitor activity levels, sleep patterns, and barking behavior, providing insights into pets' overall well-being.

=== Subscription model ===
The functionality of Tractive's devices requires a subscription plan, covering the costs associated with the built-in SIM card and data usage. Subscription plans start at $5 per month, offering features such as real-time tracking, health monitoring, and global coverage.

== Funding and capitalization ==
Tractive raised $500,000 in 2012 and €2 million in 2016 from former race car driver Harold Primat. In 2018, they raised an additional "seven-digit" sum from Monkfish Equity, the investment vehicle of the founders of Runtastic and Trivago.

In 2021, Tractive closed a $35 million growth investment round led by Guidepost Growth Equity, a U.S.-based private equity firm. The capital was used to expand the company's presence in North America, invest in hardware and software development, and grow the team across its European and U.S. offices.

== Integrations and partnerships ==
In 2023, Tractive launched a joint research project with the Max Planck Institute for Animal Behavior to investigate deviations in pet behavior before natural disasters. In 2024, Tractive integrated with the fitness tracking app Strava, allowing users to share their pets' activities and track fitness goals. In 2025, the company partnered with Homey, an LG smart home platform, enabling pet owners to create automations between Tractive devices and other smart home devices. Additionally, Tractive collaborated with Lassie, a pet insurance provider, to offer comprehensive pet health and safety solutions.

== Recognition ==
Tractive's GPS and health tracker was recognized by Consumer Reports as a top-rated pet tracker in 2024. In 2025, The New York Times Wirecutter named it the top pick for pet trackers.

The company has also received multiple Kununu Top Company awards, including recognition in 2022, 2023, and 2024, for employee satisfaction and workplace culture.
