= Whistle Stop =

A whistle stop is a stopping point at which trains stop only on request.

Whistle Stop or Whistle-Stop may also refer to:

- Whistle Stop (1946 film), starring George Raft and Ava Gardner
- Whistle Stop (1963 film) (Russian: Полустанок) a Soviet comedy directed by Boris Barnet
- Whistle Stop (album), a 1961 jazz studio album by Kenny Dorham
- "Whistle Stop", a 1994 episode of L.A. Law
- "Whistle Stop", a 2010 episode of In Plain Sight
- Whistle Stop, a fictional town in the novel Fried Green Tomatoes at the Whistle Stop Cafe and later film adaptation
- "Whistle-Stop", a song by Roger Miller from the 1973 Disney film Robin Hood

== See also ==
- Whistle-stop train tour, a style of political campaign
