= Wag (company) =

American pet care company

Wag Labs, Inc.
- Type: Private
- Industry: Pet care
- Founded: 2015; 11 years ago
- Founder: Brendan Rogers; Joshua Viner; Jonathan Viner; Jason Meltzer
- Fate: bankruptcy (21 July 2025)
- Headquarters: San Francisco, California, U.S.
- Key people: Garrett Smallwood (CEO); Olivia Munn (Creative Strategist)
- Website: wagwalking.com

Wag Labs (better known as simply Wag!) is an American pet care company that offers a technology platform to connect pet owners with independent pet professionals for on-demand and scheduled dog walking, training, and other petcare services through a mobile application. The app has been referred to as "the Uber for Dogs".

== History ==
Wag! was founded in 2015 in Los Angeles, California. In early 2018, Wag! raised $300 million in venture capital funds from Softbank. The company had previously raised $68 million in venture capital.

Celebrity users include Mariah Carey, Kendall Jenner, and Chloë Grace Moretz. Actress Olivia Munn serves as an investor and creative strategist.

In December 2019, the Wall Street Journal reported SoftBank sold its entire $300 million stake in Wag Labs back to the company at an investment loss.

Wag! announced its bid to go public through a special-purpose acquisition company (SPAC) deal with CHW Acquisition Corp in February 2022 at a $350 million valuation.

The company filed for Chapter 11 bankruptcy on 21 July 2025, citing consumer demands away from traditional services.

== Criticisms and incidents ==
In June 2017, a Wag! contractor was videotaped allegedly "making himself at home" in a user's apartment, including resting on a sofa and taking beers. In November 2017, a Wag! contractor was videotaped allegedly stealing packages from a New York City apartment building. The New York Daily News reported on a dog lost by Wag! in September 2017, and only finding the pet weeks later.

In February 2020, a Yorkie named Bella was found dead after a Wag! Service. Wag! responded with a statement that included “safety is a company-wide priority for Wag! and incidents of this nature are very rare. In fact, the average service rating on the Wag! platform is 4.97 (on a 5-point scale), and every 8 seconds a service is booked on Wag! – with 90% of Wag! customers booking a service weekly.”

== Response to COVID-19 ==
In March 2020, Wag! created a new service type called Wag! Now for miscellaneous pet care needs for pet owners in San Francisco. The service was later released to the entire United States and Wag! partnered with GreaterGood.Org to create the #stayhomeandfoster initiative, connecting independent contractors with dog and cat rescues and shelters to deliver supplies and foster pets to foster homes. As part of the initiative, Olivia Munn connected Henry Golding "with Wag! and GreaterGood.org. The two groups were able to find Golding the perfect match in Stella, a shelter dog from START Animal Rescue." In February 2020, all Wag! employees shifted to remote work. The company released communications to pet owners and independent contractors on how best to complete walks with social distancing. According to Adweek, "pet care app Wag sent an email to its users encouraging pet owners to limit interaction with dog walkers by communicating through the in-app chat feature and having the dog’s harness and leash on ahead of time, making for a 'simple handoff.' The company also provides small lockboxes to pet owners who request them, making the exchange of household keys a no-contact situation—'essentially, a built-in social distance feature,' said a Wag spokesperson. According to Wag, nearly 70% of its services are completed with a lockbox or hidden key."
