= Whistle (character) =

DC Comics superhero character

Publication information
- Publisher: DC Comics
- First appearance: Whistle: A New Gotham City Hero (Sep. 2021)
- Created by: E. Lockhart

In-story information
- Species: Metahuman
- Abilities: Superhuman strength and hearing

Whistle is a superheroine introduced by DC Comics in 2021, with an eponymous graphic novel written by E. Lockhart and illustrated by Manuel Preitano. Whistle is the alias of Willow Zimmerman, a Jewish 16-year-old activist, student and volunteer living in Gotham City. She struggles to balance adolescence, fighting for social causes, and caring for her sick mother prior to gaining new superpowers. Willow Zimmerman / Whistle is notable as one of the first new superhero characters to originate as explicitly Jewish in decades.

== Character creation ==
E. Lockhart, writer of Whistle: A New Gotham City Hero, states that she drew inspiration for the novel from her own Jewish upbringing, and modeled Down River after the Lower East Side of New York City. She was also inspired by Kamala Khan / Ms. Marvel from Marvel Comics, as that character is the first Muslim superhero to headline a comic book series. Manuel Preitano is the artist that made Whistle come to life on the page.

== Fictional biography ==
Willow Zimmerman (16) lives in the run-down, predominantly Jewish neighborhood of Down River in Gotham City. She volunteers at the local pet shelter and is very involved in her community. She takes care of her ill mother, who is an adjunct professor of Jewish studies, but has no health insurance. Whistle reconnects with her estranged Uncle Edward in order to gain employment to take care of medical bills. After encountering Killer Croc at the synagogue and gaining super powers as a result, Whistle and Willow lead the double life to support her family and fight crime and evil. Whistle is accompanied by her Great Dane, Lebowitz, who shares her superpowers and accompanies her in efforts to save Down River. Whistle also draws upon her Jewish heritage for inspiration.

== Reception ==
Caitlin Chappell of CBR.com praised Whistle: A New Gotham City Hero for introducing a relatable character from the 21st Century into the DC Universe, noting that Willow Zimmerman / Whistle is a complex character who is deeply rooted in her community. However, Chappell also notes that the novel "doesn't feel like a superhero comic until a little after the halfway point."
