= Evernote =

Notetaking software and online service

- Developer: Bending Spoons
- Release: Evernote Web: June 24, 2008

Stable release(s) [±]
- Android: 10.28 / March 7, 2022; 4 years ago
- iOS: 10.28 / March 7, 2022; 4 years ago
- macOS: 10.32.4 / March 3, 2022; 4 years ago
- Windows: 10.32.4 / March 3, 2022; 4 years ago
- Operating system: Microsoft Windows, macOS, Android, iOS
- Type: Note-taking software, integrated software
- License: Freemium, SaaS
- Website: evernote.com

Evernote is a note-taking and task-management application developed by the Evernote Corporation. Evernote was founded in 2007 by Russian entrepreneur Stepan Pachikov. The company released the first public version of the Evernote web application on June 24, 2008. The service gained popularity for its ability to synchronize notes across multiple devices and platforms, allowing users to capture and organize information such as text, images, and web content.

== History ==
In October 2010, Evernote raised $20 million in funding led by Sequoia Capital, DoCoMo Capital, Troika Dialog and Morgenthaler Ventures as the service continued to expand its user base. The funding round came as the company saw a large amount of growth since its launch in 2008.

In 2012, Evernote launched Evernote Business, a version of the service for teams that enabled users to share notes and collaborate within an organization.

Also in 2012, Evernote had launched its China based service under the name, Yinxiang Biji (Chinese: 印象笔记) which in June 2018 transitioned into a company with its own full autonomy.

Evernote was acquired by the Italian technology company Bending Spoons in November 2022.

== Usage ==
Evernote is used for creating and managing textual notes, with the ability to embed photos, audio, and saved web content.

Notes are stored in virtual "notebooks" which can be arranged hierarchically, and can be tagged, annotated, edited, searched, and exported.

=== Data entry ===
In addition to textual notes, Evernote supports image capture from cameras on supported devices and voice note recording. In some situations, text that appears in captured images can be recognized using optical character recognition (OCR) and annotated.

Evernote supports touch and tablet screens with handwriting recognition and the ability to e-mail notes to the service, allowing for automated note entry via email rules or filters.

Where suitable hardware is available, Evernote can automatically add geolocation tags to notes.

== Data storage and access ==
Users with internet access and an Evernote account will have their notes automatically synchronized with a master copy held on Evernote's servers.

This approach gives a user access to edit their data across multiple machines and operating system platforms from anywhere, but still view, input, and edit data when an internet connection is not available. Offline changes will only be saved as a draft until internet connection is established.

Evernote uses industry standard security to encrypt and protect users information.

Where Evernote client software is not available, online account holders can access their note archives via a web interface or through a media device. The service also allows selected files to be shared for viewing and editing by other users.

== Accounts ==
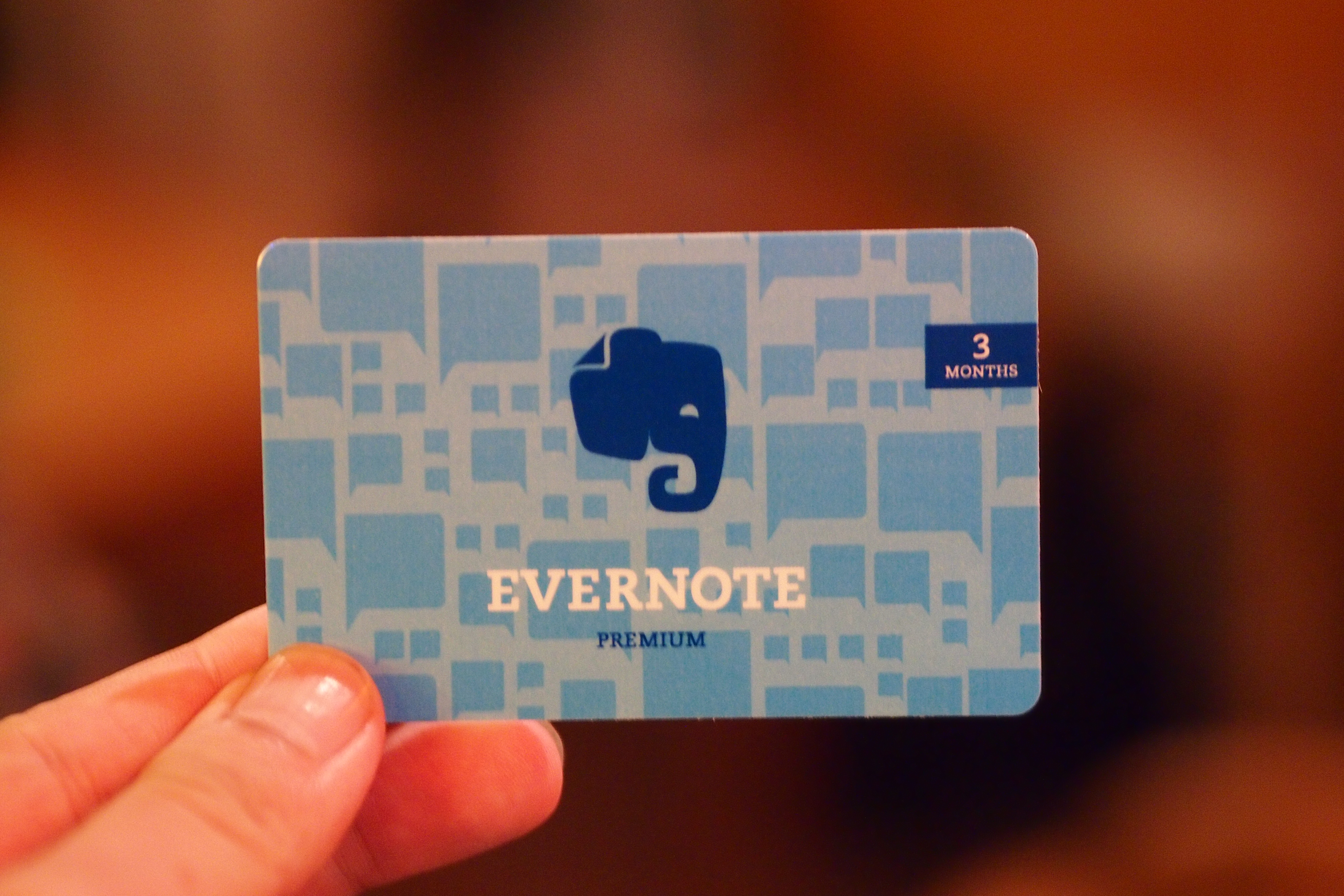
Evernote Premium gift card

Evernote has various account options, including free and paid tiers.

As of February 2025, Evernote has a free plan of 50 notes (of a maximum size of 200 MB) and 1 notebook, syncing to 1 device. Paid plans include Personal, Professional and Teams offerings. Enterprise services are also available upon request.

Accounts on the Professional tier have a 20 GB upload limit per month, can export notes as PDF files, and can forward emails directly into Evernote, which includes a 20% discount on Adobe Acrobat Standard.

The free service, meanwhile, does not make files available offline on iOS and Android devices; while sometimes they are available from cache, editing these files can cause conflicts when synchronizing.

== Supported platforms ==
Evernote clients are available for Android, iOS (iPad, iPhone, and previously, iPod Touch), macOS, Microsoft Windows, and Web.

Additionally, portable versions of Evernote are available for flash drives and U3 drives. There are no officially supported native clients for BSD or Linux, but the company provides an API for external Linux clients.

There is substantial variation in supported features on different platforms. For example, it is possible to edit Rich Text Format and sketches on Windows, while on Apple Macintosh it is possible to edit rich text, but only view sketches.

Web clipping support is installed by default on the Internet Explorer and Safari browsers when the Evernote software is installed on Windows or macOS.

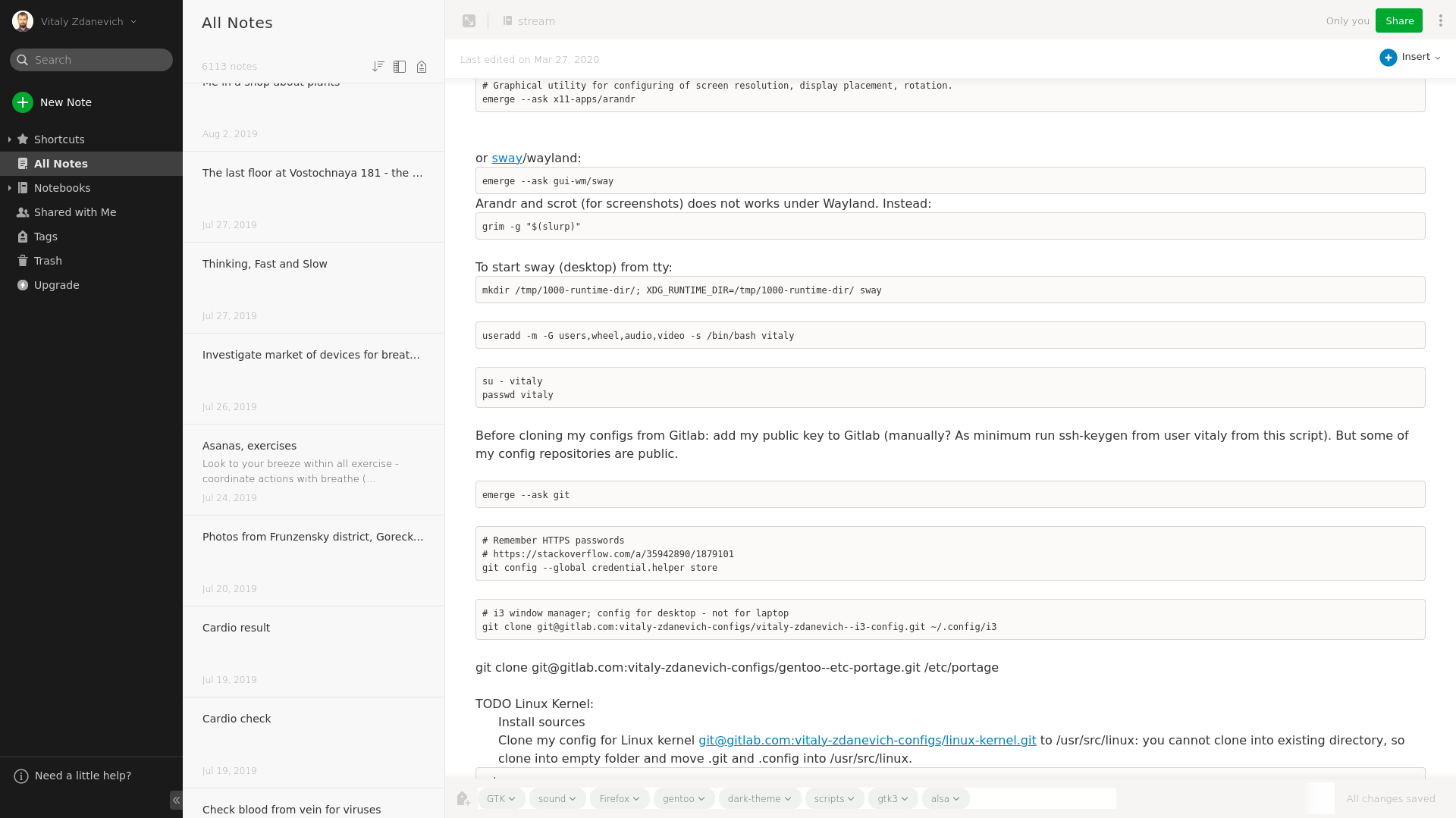
Evernote web in 2020

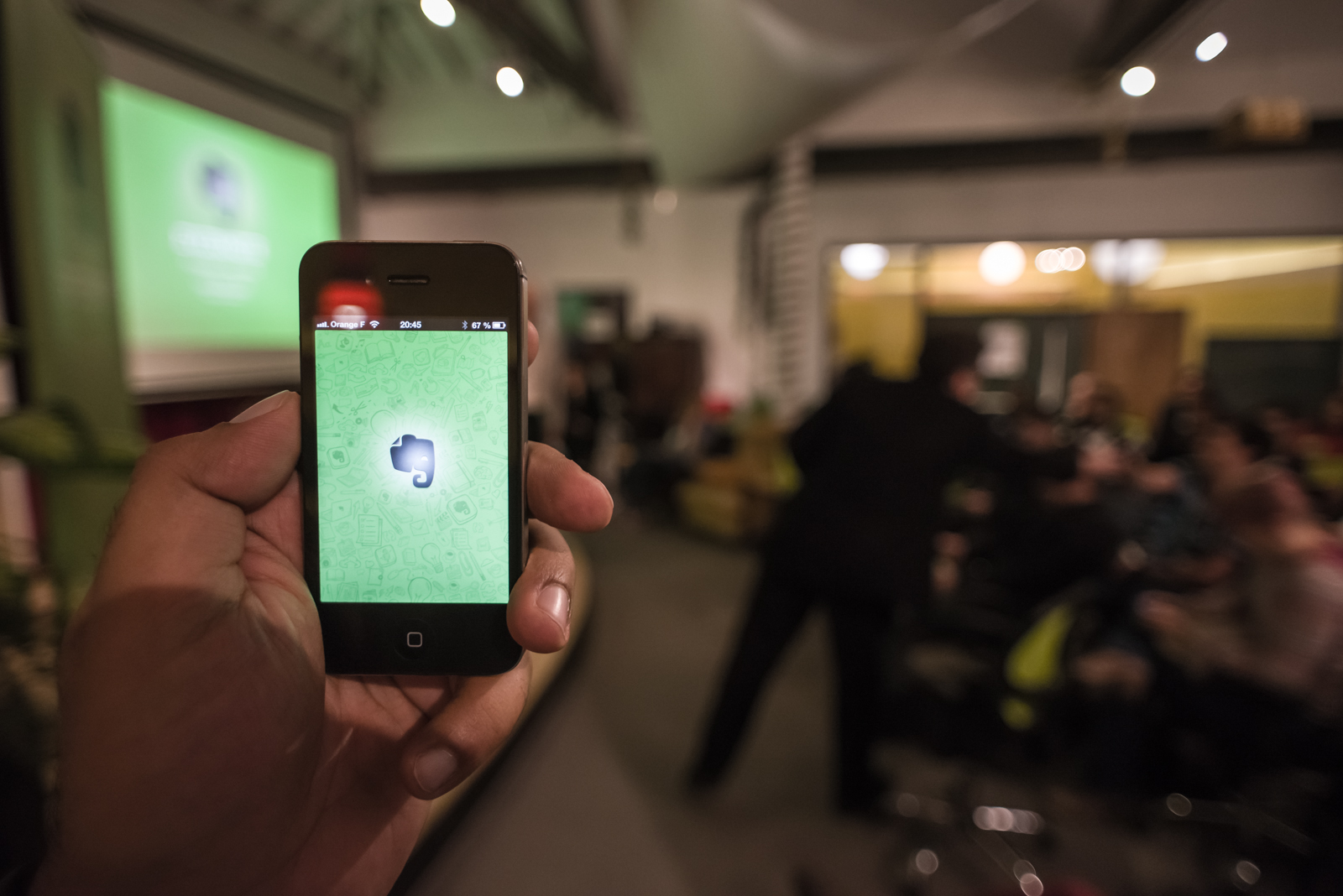
Evernote client on an iOS device (iPhone 4/4S)

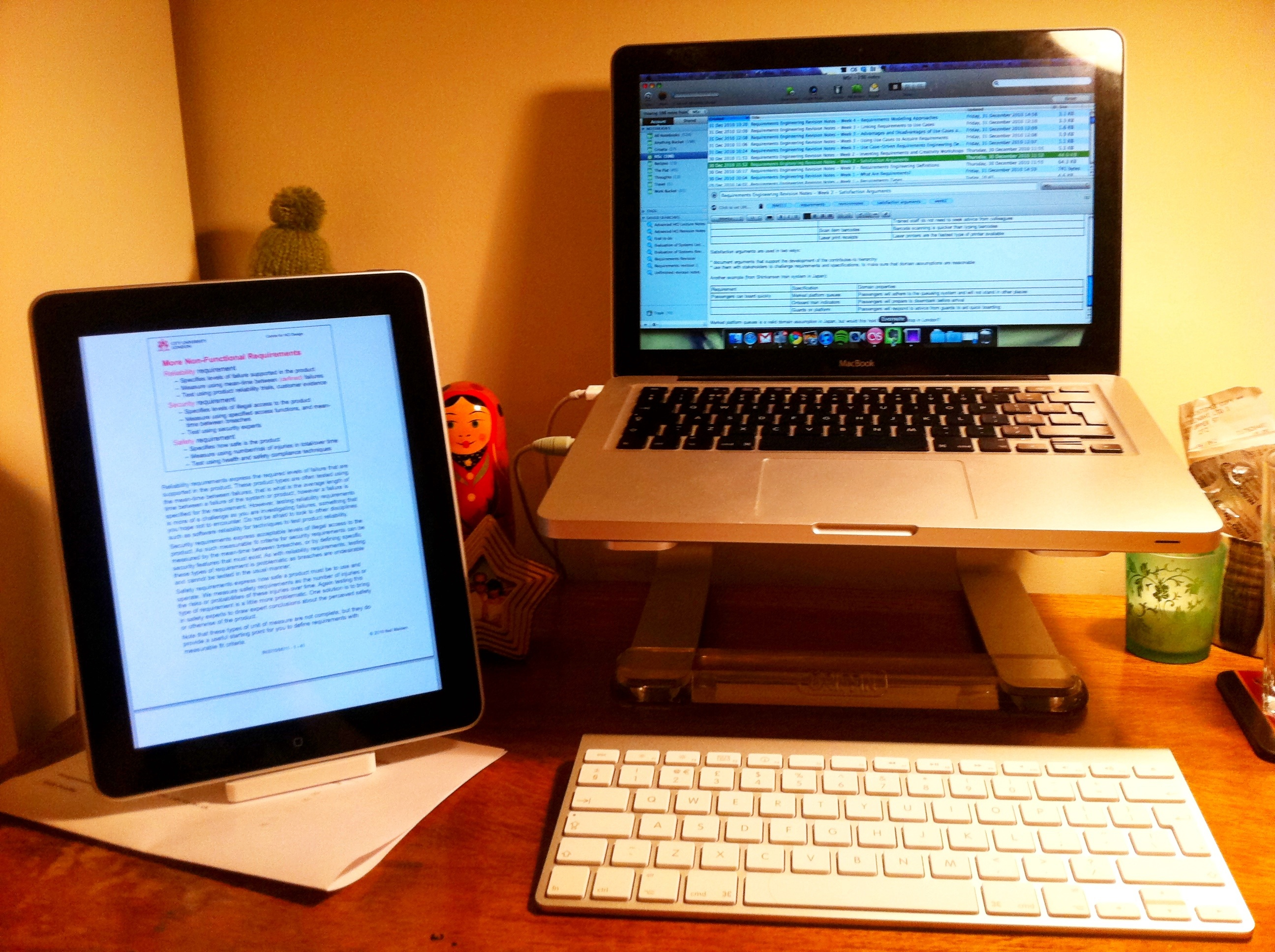
Evernote on an iPad and on a MacBook

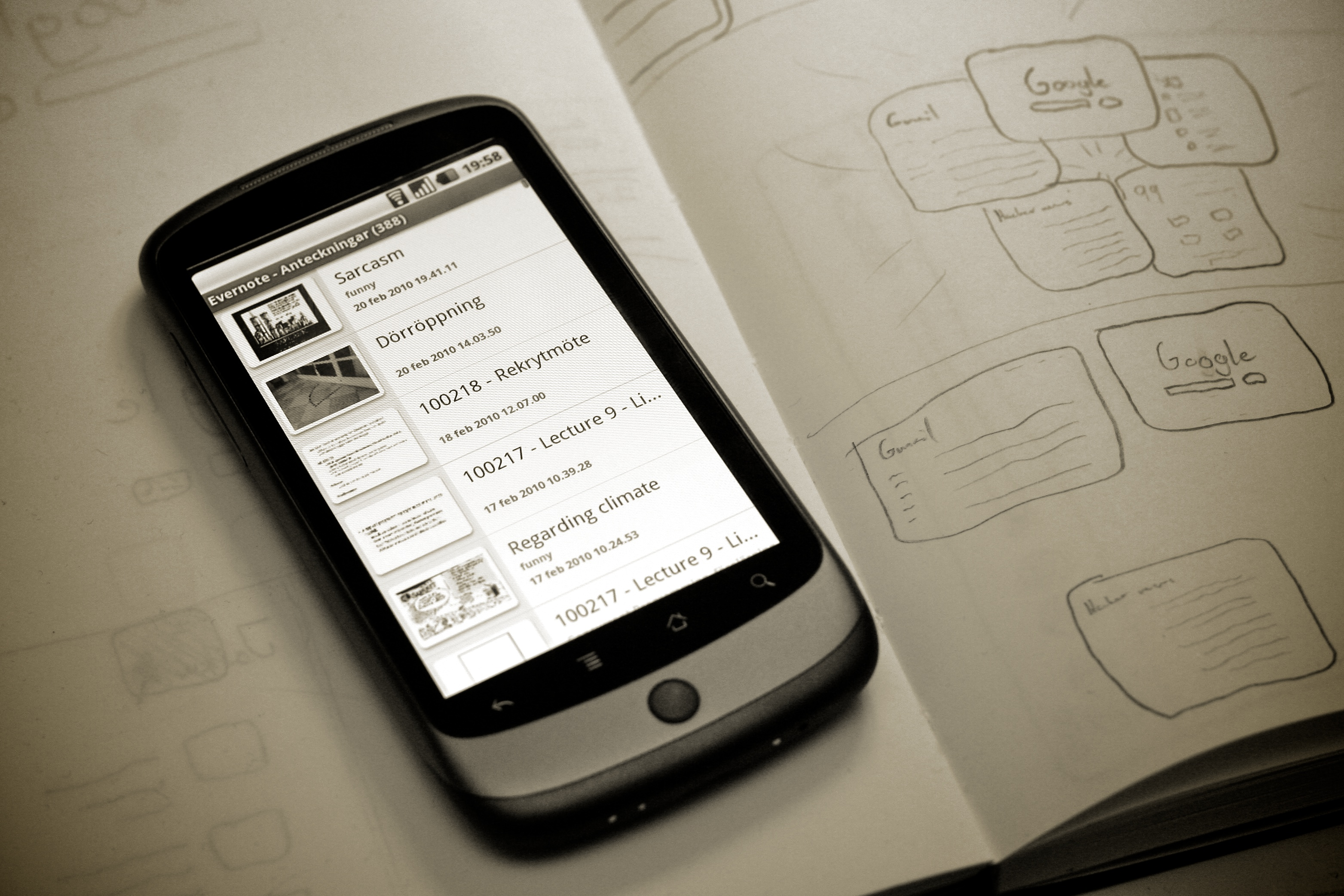
Evernote client on an Android device (Nexus One)

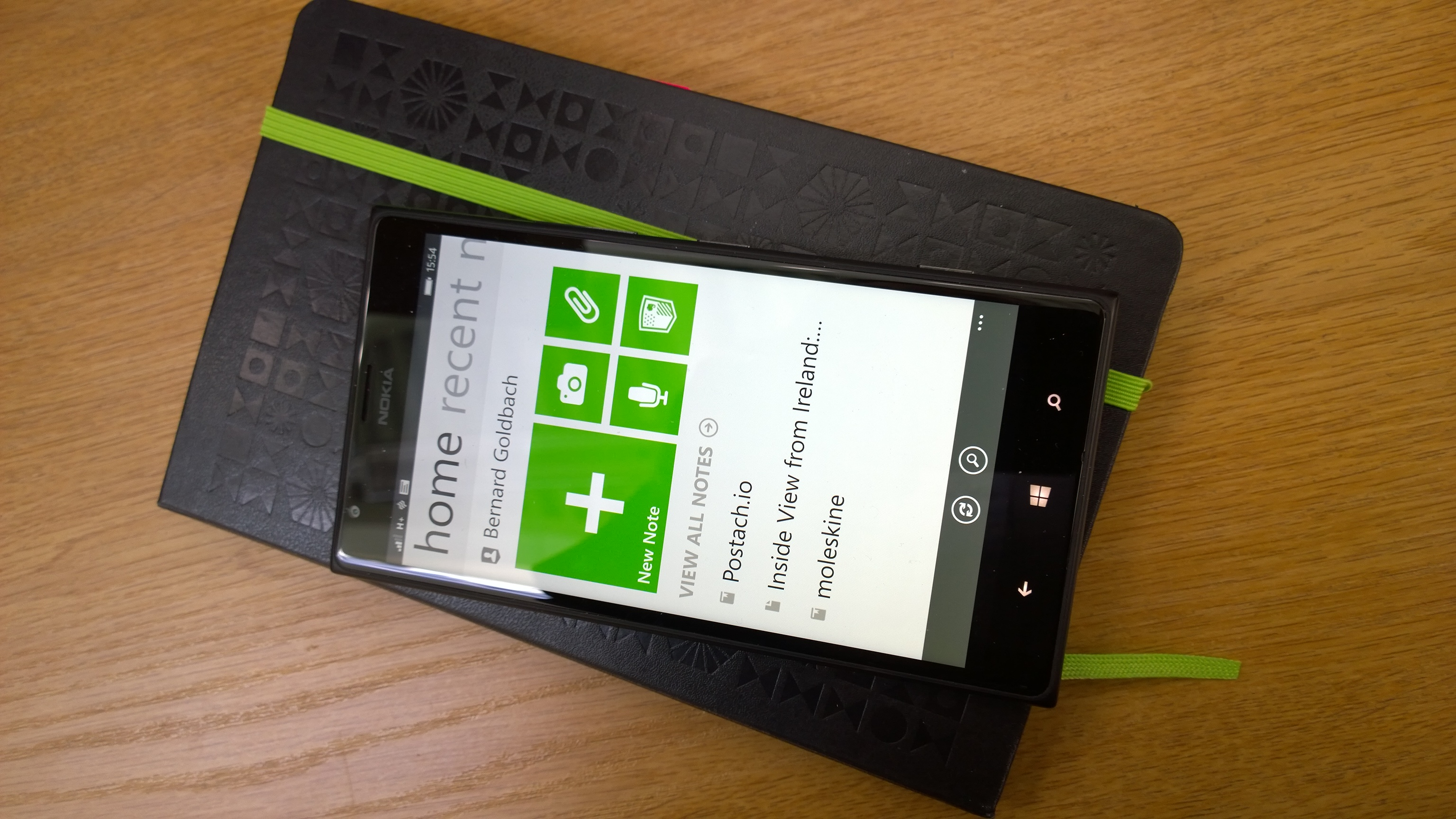
Evernote client on a Windows Phone device (Nokia Lumia)

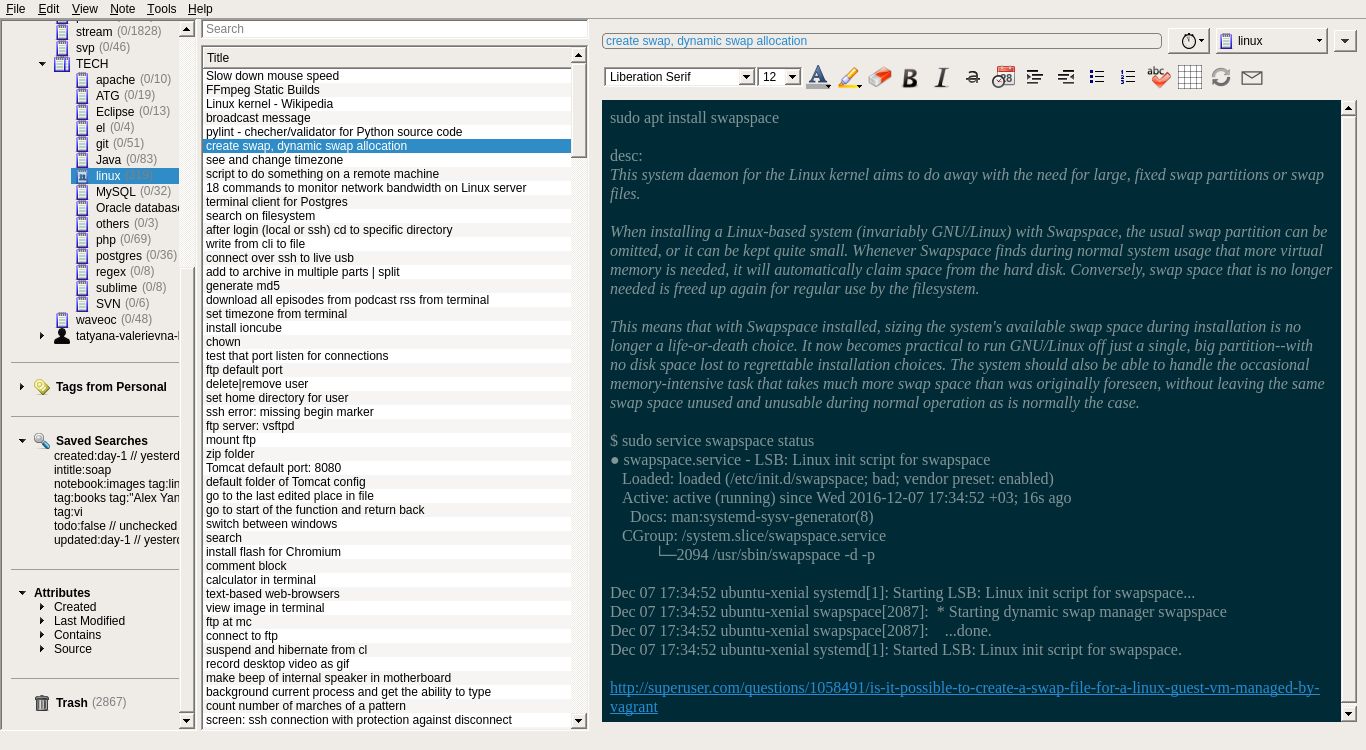
Nixnote, unofficial free and open source client

== Apps ==
=== Everton Scannable ===
Everton Scannable is an iOS app that captures content on paper quickly, transforming it into high-quality scans ready to save or share.

=== Skitch ===
Skitch is a free screenshot editing and sharing utility for OS X, iOS, Windows, and Android.

The app permits the user to add shapes and text to an image, and then share it online. Images can also be exported to various image formats.

Originally developed by Plasq, Skitch was acquired by Evernote on August 18, 2011.

Evernote discontinued Skitch for Windows, Windows Touch, iOS, and Android in January 2016. Evernote continues to offer Skitch for Mac.

=== Web Clipper ===
Evernote Web Clipper is a simple browser extension that lets a user capture full-page articles, images, selected text, important emails, and any web page for use in Evernote's software. The plugin is available for Firefox, Google Chrome, Opera, and Yandex browsers.

=== Integrations ===
As of November 2018, Evernote Pro integrates directly with Google Drive, Microsoft Outlook, Microsoft Teams, and Slack, and Evernote Pro adds an integration with Salesforce. All versions of Evernote also support integrations through IFTTT and Zapier.

In 2013, Evernote discontinued its direct integration with Twitter, recommending IFTTT and Zapier as alternatives.

== Partnerships ==
=== Blinkist ===
The book-summarizing service Blinkist offers members the ability to synchronize their highlighted text passages to Evernote.

This happens in notes for each book with the title of the book as the note title.

=== Deutsche Telekom ===
On March 25, 2013, Evernote announced a partnership with Deutsche Telekom to provide German customers with free access to Evernote Premium for one year.

In January 2014 the partnership was expanded to additional European and Asian markets.

=== Moleskine ===
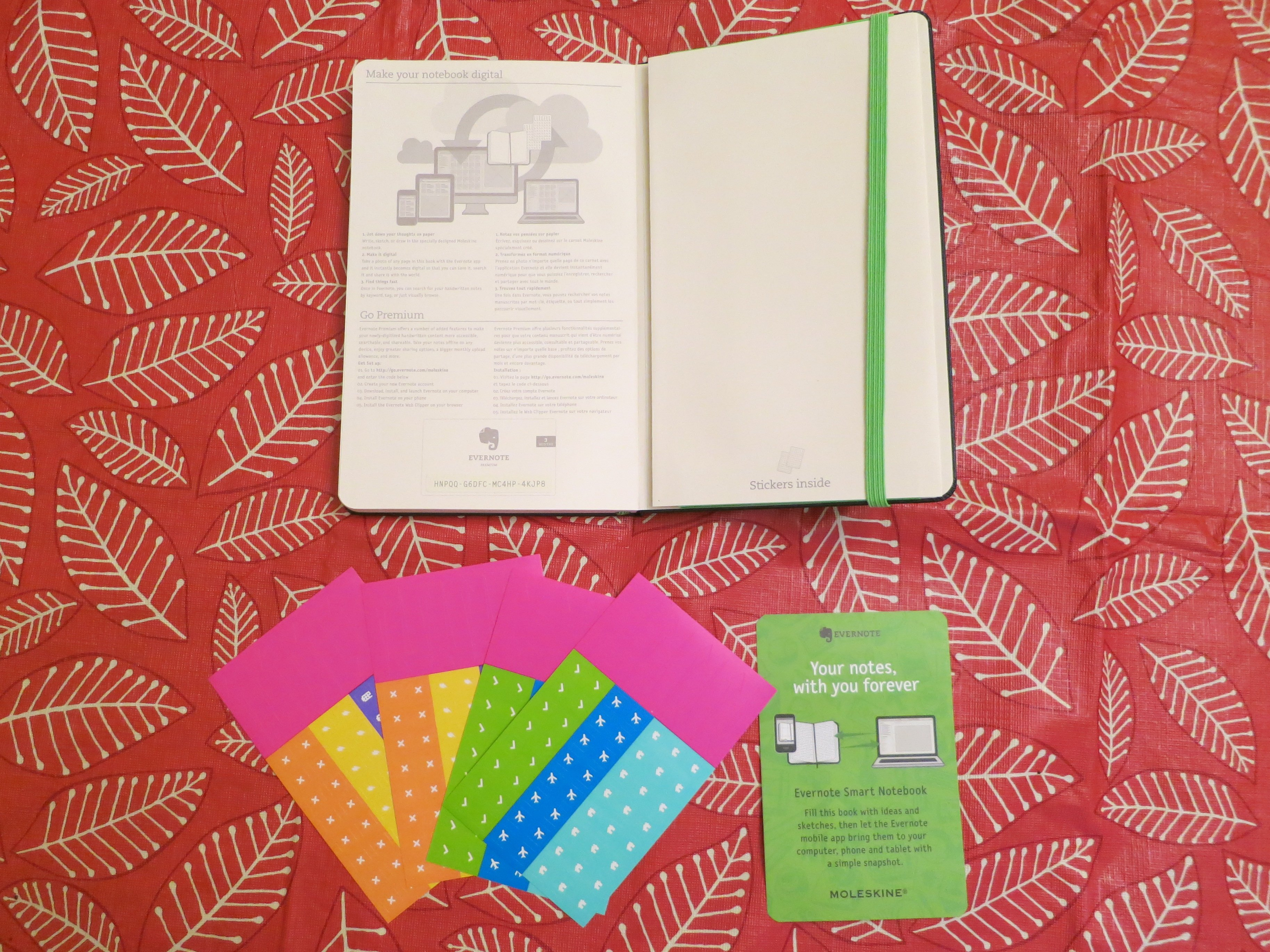
Evernote Smart Notebook

In August 2012, Moleskine partnered with Evernote to produce a digital-friendly notebook with specially designed pages and stickers for smartphone syncing.

=== Samsung ===
All Samsung Galaxy Note 3 phablets included a free one-year subscription to Evernote Premium.

=== Telefónica Digital ===
On August 13, 2013, The New York Times reported that Telefónica Digital and Evernote entered into a global partnership agreement, giving Brazilian customers free access to Evernote Premium for one year.

Under this global deal, Telefónica users in Costa Rica, Guatemala, Panama, the United Kingdom, and Spain were also offered the promotion.

== Incidents ==
=== Data loss ===
The service has experienced several cases of losing customer data.

=== Denial-of-service attacks ===
On June 11, 2014, Evernote suffered a distributed denial-of-service attack that prevented customers from accessing their information. The attackers demanded a ransom, which Evernote refused to pay.

A denial-of-service attack on August 8, 2014, resulted in a brief period of downtime for evernote.com; service was quickly restored.

=== Security breach ===
On March 2, 2013, Evernote revealed that hackers gained access to their network and accessed user information, including usernames, email addresses, and hashed passwords. All users were asked to reset their passwords.

In the wake of this, Evernote accelerated plans to implement an optional two-factor authentication for all users.

== Controversies ==
=== Privacy policy ===
In December 2016, Evernote announced its privacy policy would be changing in January 2017, leading to claims the policy allowed employees of the firm to access users' content in some situations.

In response to the concerns, Evernote apologized and announced the policy would not be implemented, and that its employees would not have access to users' content unless users opted in.

=== Evernote v10 ===
In late 2020, Evernote released Evernote v10, written from scratch in the Electron framework, to replace older versions on multiple platforms.

Some users noted the new app was much slower than the previous Windows and iOS versions, had many features removed, and did not work with some default keyboard layouts, including Turkish, Latvian, and Polish, due to a conflict of hardcoded key bindings.

This was later changed to allow customization of keyboard shortcuts and some of the previous features were added again.

=== Drastic reduction of free edition ===
In June 2016, Evernote introduced a new limitation to just 2 devices on the free plan (previously unlimited) and increased the price of their paid plans.

From early April 2018, Evernote Plus was no longer available for purchase; However, users who had the Plus subscription can maintain it as long as their subscription is remains active. In July 2024 these users received email saying that their next renewal would automatically upgrade them to the Personal plan.

In December 2023, Evernote reduced its free plan drastically (to a maximum of 50 editable notes), taking effect the same day. This change and the lack of transition period have been considered unfavorable to free users who have used Evernote for years.

In August 2024, Evernote further reduced its free plan to allow only one connected device at a time, with a maximum of two "desyncs" per month.

== See also ==
- Comparison of note-taking software
- List of personal information managers
