= Chuck Dietrich =

American business executive

- Education: MBA in Business; BA in Economics
- Alma mater: University of Colorado (BA); University of Utah (MBA)
- Occupation: Entrepreneur
- Known for: Executive at Salesforce.com; SlideRocket; VMWare; MileIQ

Chuck Dietrich is an American entrepreneur and current CEO of MileIQ. Prior to MileIQ, Dietrich worked at Salesforce.com and was the CEO at SlideRocket before facilitating its sale to VMWare and its eventual divestment to ClearSlide. Dietrich is also credited as one of the early adopters of wing foiling in the San Francisco Bay Area having started in early 2019.

== Education ==
Dietrich holds a Bachelor of Arts in Economics from the University of Colorado and a Master of Business Administration from the University of Utah.

== Career ==
After graduating from the University of Colorado, Dietrich and colleagues built a company that sold to Conair for an undisclosed amount of money. After earning his MBA, Dietrich interned for Marc Benioff at Oracle. Dietrich was one of the early employees that Benioff hired at his San Francisco startup, Salesforce.com, in 2000. Over the course of 9 years at Salesforce, Dietrich worked his way into the position of vice president and general manager of Salesforce Mobile. In 2006, he spearheaded the successful acquisition of Sendia, a mobile technology firm. He was also responsible for overseeing Salesforce's partnership for CRM, Force.com, and custom applications while also providing strategic support to mobile carriers and device providers like Nokia, Apple, Motorola, and more. He presented on stage with Steve Jobs at Apple's launch of the AppStore in 2008.

In 2009, he left Salesforce to become the CEO of SlideRocket, an online presentation platform similar to Microsoft's PowerPoint. On the day of his appointment to the position, SlideRocket also received $5 million in its second round of funding. By 2010, the SlideRocket software was being used by over 100,000 companies. In 2011, Dietrich facilitated the sale of SlideRocket to VMWare for an undisclosed amount of money. SlideRocket remained autonomous after VMWare's acquisition. The goal was to help VMWare branch out into enterprise applications. Dietrich became the vice president and general manager of VMWare after SlideRocket was acquired. After a change of strategy, VMWare eventually sold SlideRocket to ClearSlide in 2013.

In 2013, Dietrich met Dan Bomze, and the two began developing a company built around an app that logged vehicle mileage for working professionals. They founded MileIQ in 2013, with Dietrich becoming the company's CEO. In 2015, the company secured $11 million in its second round of funding. Investors for the company have included SV Angel, Trinity Ventures, CRV, and Dietrich's former employer, Marc Benioff. Dietrich has also facilitated partnerships between MileIQ and other software companies like Concur Technologies and FreshBooks. Dietrich has also been a member of the board of directors for companies like BrightTALK, RJMetrics, and Preact.
