= MileIQ =

American-based technology company

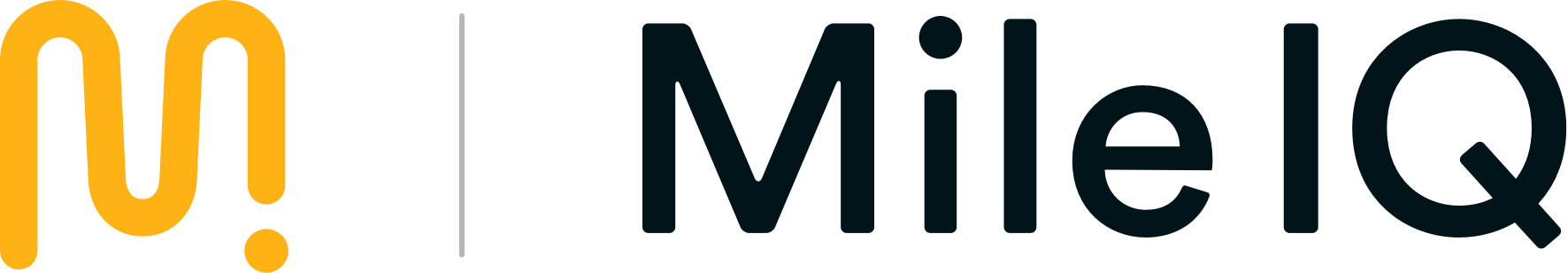

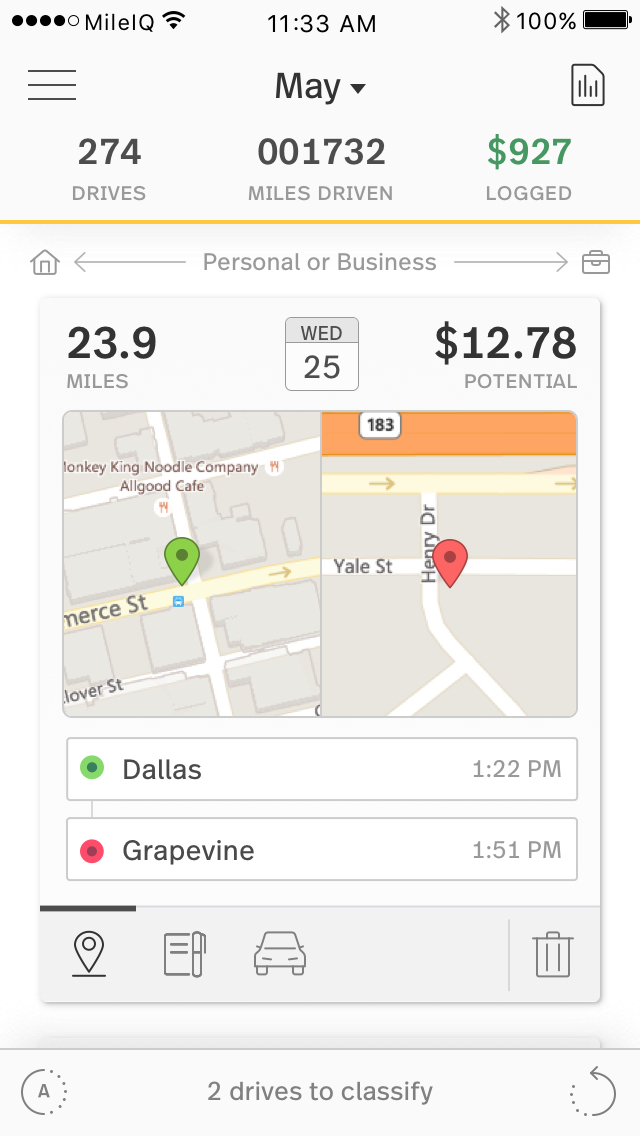
- MileIQ drive feed
- Type: Private
- Industry: Software
- Founded: September 2013; 13 years ago
- Founders: Dan Bomze; Chuck Dietrich
- Headquarters: San Francisco, California, United States
- Key people: Chuck Dietrich (CEO 2013-2015), Dan Bomze (CEO 2021-2023), Andrey Kolesnikov (CEO 2023-2025)
- Products: MileIQ mobile app
- Parent: Bending Spoons (2025–present); Microsoft (2015–2021)
- Website: www.mileiq.com

MileIQ is an American-based technology company that develops a mileage tracking and logging app.

The app uses automatic mileage tracking to calculate mileage while driving for business purposes that can then be used to report for reimbursement and potentially a tax deduction with the IRS, being attributed as the first mobile app to passively track such data. MileIQ has been compared to Fitbit for driving and has been discussed in national business publications that include Fast Company, Fortune, and Forbes.

On November 5, 2015, Microsoft announced that it had acquired MileIQ. On March 18, 2021, Microsoft divested MileIQ and it became an independent company again. Subsequently, in July 2025, the company was acquired by Bending Spoons for $233 million.

== History ==
MileIQ was founded by Dan Bomze, an entrepreneur and investor of numerous startups. He began collaborating with a small team to design software that would simplify mileage reimbursement. Bomze obtained feedback from others who tracked mileage for reimbursement and began looking for a business partner knowledgeable with software development. He was introduced to SlideRocket CEO and former Salesforce.com general manager Chuck Dietrich who became a founding partner in the company. MileIQ was officially launched in the App Store in 2013, later becoming available for Android.

Concur Technologies, a company that integrates third-party apps for users to file business reports, added MileIQ to its service offerings in early 2014. The same year, MileIQ partnered with cloud accounting software company FreshBooks. The partnership allowed users of MileIQ to automatically import their driving data into their FreshBooks accounts.

MileIQ received seed funding in amount of $3 million (~$4.01 million in 2025) in late 2014, led by SV Angel, CRV, and Salesforce.com founder Marc Benioff. MileIQ added $11 million (~$14.6 million in 2025) in funding in 2015 with a Series A round that included original investors as well as the addition of Trinity Ventures.

On November 5, 2015, Microsoft announced that it had acquired MileIQ for an undisclosed amount and the app was integrated into the Microsoft license scheme. On March 18, 2021, Microsoft divested MileIQ and it reverted to an independent company again as MileIQ LLC. The newly independent company was led by the original creators of the mileage tracking app.

MileIQ was acquired by Bending Spoons on July 8, 2025.

== Products and services ==
MileIQ offers an app named after the company ("MileIQ") which passively tracks and logs mileage of users. The app works in the background of a Smartphone, tracking and recording all driving activities. It uses artificial intelligence and machine learning to filter personal and business mileage based on time, day, and other factors. The app syncs with online mileage logs to document information obtained while driving.

The MileIQ app is available for free download on the App Store and Google Play. After a one-time download and profile set-up, it works like an activity tracker and begins to log drives automatically, or allows for manual entry of travel. The user swipes left or right at the end of each trip to indicate if the trip was for personal or business. The free version of the app tracks up to 40 drives per month with a premium feature that allows for more.

== See also ==
- Business mileage reimbursement rate
- Tax deduction
- Vehicle miles traveled tax
