= 100 Montgomery Street =

Office tower in San Francisco

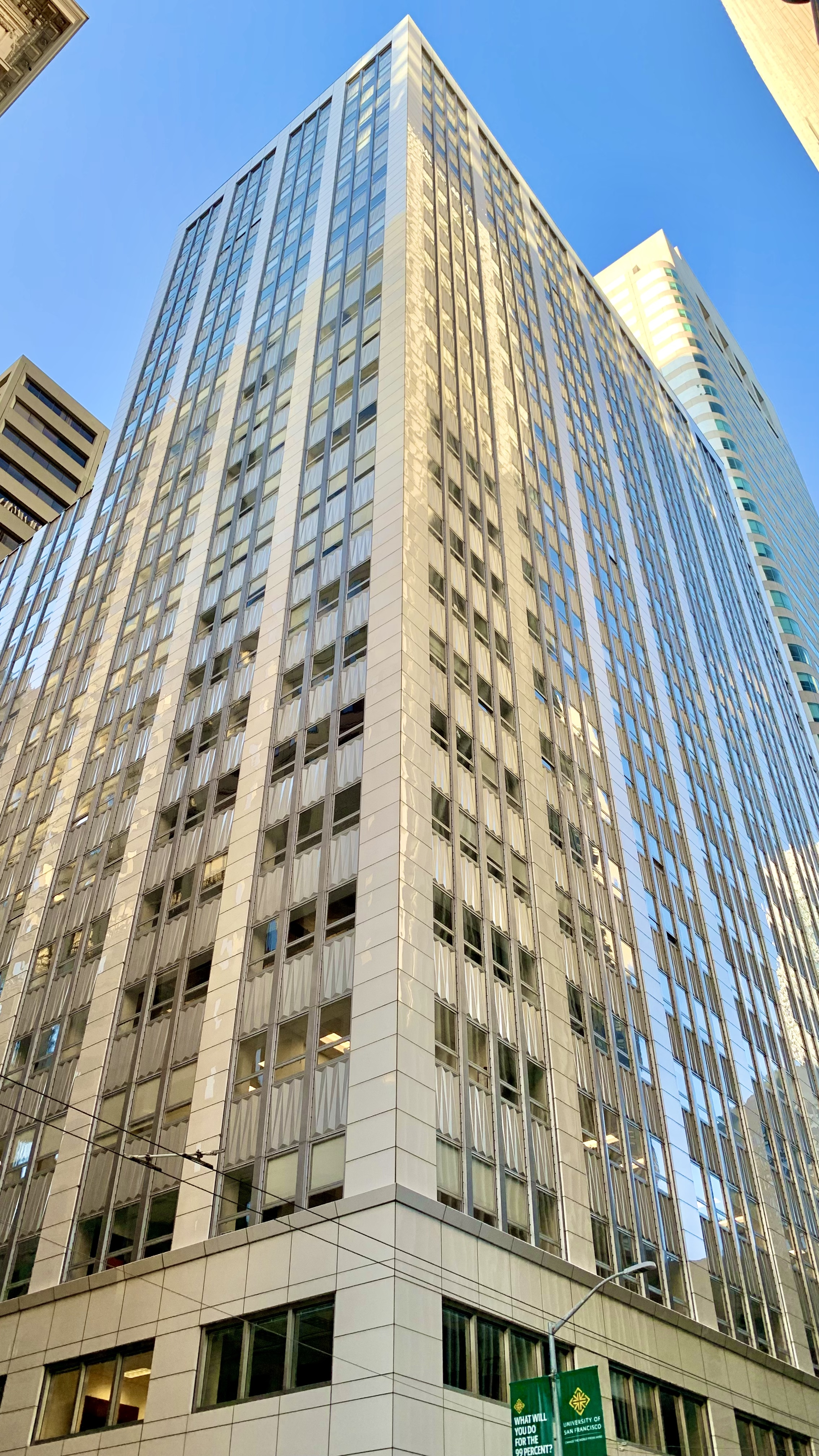
- In 2021

- Location within San Francisco
- Alternative names: Equitable Life; 120 Montgomery Street

General information
- Type: Commercial offices
- Location: 100-120 Montgomery Street; San Francisco, California
- Coordinates: 37.7903°N 122.4019°W
- Completed: 1955
- Owner: Vanbarton Group

Height
- Roof: 354 ft (108 m)

Technical details
- Floor count: 25
- Floor area: 424,354 sq ft (39,423.8 m^{2})

Design and construction
- Architects: Irwin Clavan; William Peugh; Robert A.M. Stern Architects
- Main contractor: Dinwiddie Construction Company

100 Montgomery Street, also known as the Equitable Life Building, is an office tower located in the financial district of San Francisco, California. The 354-foot (108 m), 25-floor tower was completed in 1955 and served as headquarters to the Equitable Life Insurance Company.

Designed by William Peugh, 100 Montgomery Street is one of the first post-World War II office buildings in San Francisco, distinguished by classical white marble facade against aluminum art-deco window framing. It was purchased by developer Hines and its partner Sterling American Property in January 2006 for US$67.5 million from EQ Office. Hines and Sterling sold the building to EQ Office, an affiliate of The Blackstone Group LP, for US$165 million in October 2012, who in turn sold it for a reported $285 million to the Vanbarton Group and a pension fund partner in 2016.

== Tenants ==
- Epsilon
- Arcadis
- Blend Labs
- BrightTALK
- City National Bank
- HealthMarkets
- RunawayTours
- Snapfish
- Talener Group LLC
- The Segal Company
- Trinity Life Sciences
- United States General Services Administration
- Veeva Systems
- Wells Fargo Bank
- Glumac, a Tetra Tech Company

== See also ==
- San Francisco's tallest buildings
