= Castleknock College =

Private secondary school for boys in Dublin, Ireland

St Vincent's Castleknock College
- Coláiste Chaisleán Cnucha
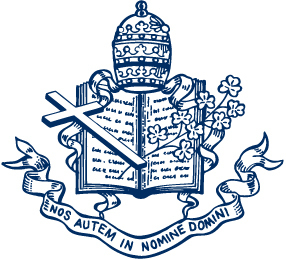

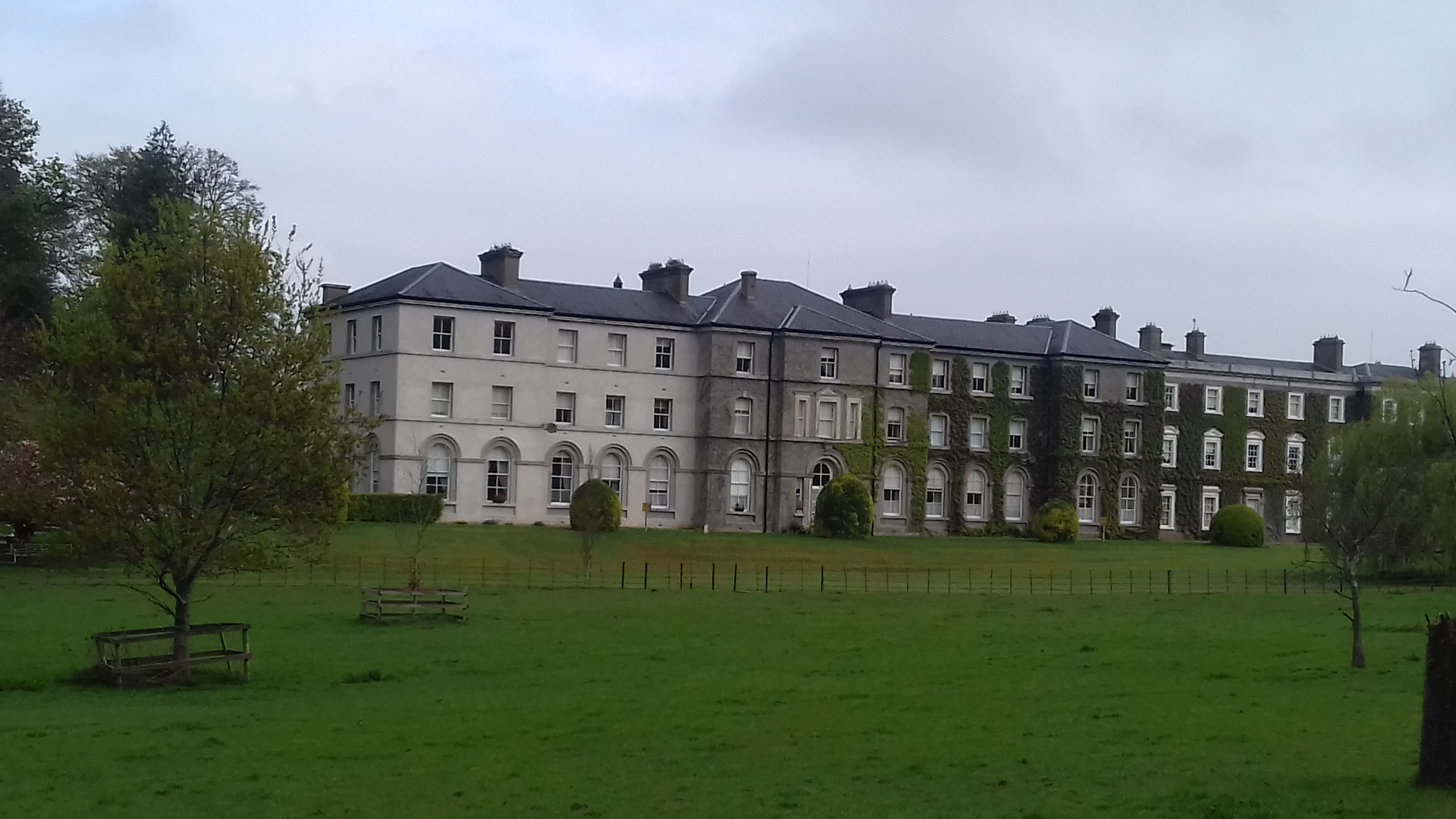

Location
- Castleknock; Ireland; 53.3685°N 6.3683°W

Information
- Type: Voluntary
- Motto: Nos Autem in Nomine Domini ("We however (put our trust) in the Name of the Lord")
- Religious affiliations: Roman Catholic, Vincentian
- Patron saint: Saint Vincent de Paul
- Established: 1835; 191 years ago
- Founder: Philip Dowley
- President: Very Rev. Paschal Scallon C.M.
- Principal: Elaine Kelly
- Chaplain: Annemarie Dolan
- Gender: Male
- Age range: 12–19
- Enrollment: 780
- Houses: Bodkin, O’Shea, O’Callaghan, Ferris
- Colours: Navy and sky blue
- Song: Nos Autem, Abide With Me
- Publication: The Castleknock College Chronicle
- Alumni: Pastmen
- Website: castleknockcollege.ie

Castleknock College (Irish: Coláiste Caisleán Cnucha) is a voluntary Vincentian secondary school for boys, situated in the residential suburb of Castleknock, eight km (5.0 mi) west of Dublin city centre, Ireland.

Founded in 1835 by Philip Dowley, it is one of the oldest boys' schools in Ireland. Although priority is given to those of the main Catholic tradition, as a Christian school, it is attended by students of other denominations and faiths. The school's colours are navy and sky blue. The school crest is a book, symbolising education, a cross, symbolising Catholicism, the Irish shamrock, symbolising the success of the Vincentians in Ireland and the papal tiara, symbolising loyalty to the Holy See.

== History ==
In 1830, a year after the passing of Catholic Emancipation, priests from the Vincentian Community (Congregation of the Mission; CM) in Maynooth College obtained permission to open a day school under the patronage of the Archbishop of Dublin. On 28 August 1833 a day school at 24 Usher's Quay, in central Dublin, was opened.

On 28 August 1835, St. Vincent's Ecclesiastical Seminary was opened in Castleknock, as a boarding school catering for just 47 boys. The first student to enrol in 1835 was John Lynch of Clones, County Monaghan. He would later enter the Vincentian order and eventually become Archbishop of Toronto. A contemporary of John Lynch was Patrick Moran, who would also be ordained as a Vincentian priest and become Bishop of Cape Town before being appointed as the first Catholic bishop of Dunedin (New Zealand) in 1869.

Philip Dowley a former Dean of Maynooth and Provincial for the Vincentians, was the first president of the college.

The school site had previously been occupied by a Protestant school for boys run by William Gwynne. The school buildings together with 40 acres of land were sold to the Vincentian Fathers in 1835.

Queen Victoria and her royal party visited the school on 22 April 1900. The event is historic, as being the first occasion that an English sovereign visited an Irish Catholic college. The intended visit of the Queen to Castleknock was made known to the authorities of the school some days beforehand by the Rudolph Feilding, 9th Earl of Denbigh. This royal visit confirmed a place for the school at the summit of Irish education and Irish society.

Before the foundation of Clonliffe College in 1861, seminarians for the Dublin Archdiocese would study in Castleknock before completing their studies in Maynooth College.

== Academic life ==
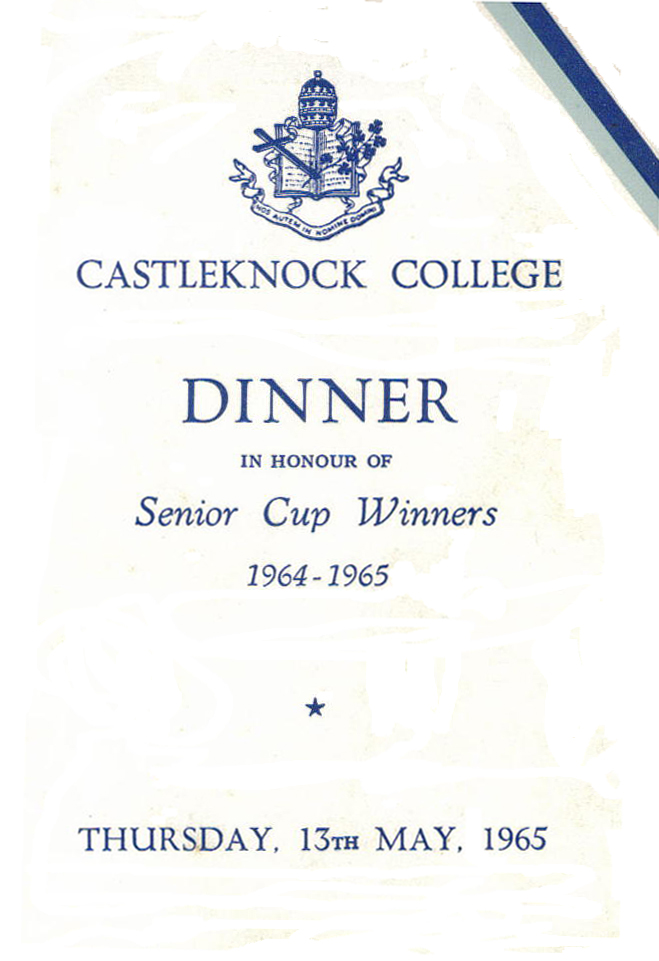
Menu from celebration dinner

The school aims for a low teacher/pupil ratio, and has a range of computing and science laboratories. The school's Alton Library, a reference and lending facility, is the largest second-level school library in Ireland.

== Sporting tradition ==
Sporting facilities at the school include nine rugby pitches, one soccer pitch, a cricket crease with pavilion, table tennis room, state of the art tennis courts, a fully equipped weights room and an athletics track.

Sport has been played at Castleknock since the foundation of the college. Throughout the mid-nineteenth century a game peculiar to Castleknock, known as stilts, was played by the entire student body on a gravel patch in grounds. Owing to the often over-zealous efforts of the participants this game was discouraged by the college fathers in favour of soccer, which was the game of choice among students of Castleknock until 1909 when it was replaced by rugby as the college's primary sport. In 1918 the college won the Leinster Colleges Senior Hurling Championship. Shortly afterwards the college concentrated more on rugby and the playing of Gaelic games became less prominent.

=== Rugby ===
Rugby posts were first erected in the college in November 1909. The school has won the Leinster Schools Senior Cup on eight occasions since first entering (and winning) the competition in 1913. Castleknock teams have been runners-up in the competition on fifteen occasions, contesting more finals than any other school apart from Belvedere College and Blackrock College. The Leinster Schools Junior Cup has also been won on eight occasions, the last time in 1966. Castleknock is considered to be one of the Major Leinster Rugby Schools, the others being Blackrock, Clongowes, Belvedere, Terenure, St Michael's and St Mary's. The college appointed Adrian Flavin, a former Ireland rugby player, as director of rugby in the year 2013.

26 past men have represented Ireland at full international level, the most recent being Leinster Rugby's Devin Toner (class of 2004) who has been capped on seventy occasions. Toner is one of two past men to have won the Heineken Cup (2009, 2011, 2012) with Denis Hurley of Munster Rugby lifting the trophy in 2008.

Past men James Leo Farrell and Michael Dunne were part of the British and Irish Lions touring squad to New Zealand and Australia. Farrell had also played for the Lions on the 1927 tour to Argentina.

=== Athletics ===
Students can choose from sprints, relays, long-distance, cross-country, hurdles, high jump, long jump, triple jump, javelin, shot-put, hammer, discus, pole vault and walking. In the summer term, the college competes in the Leinster and All-Ireland finals held in Tullamore. The college has minor, junior, intermediate and senior athletics teams which compete for, and have won, the West Leinster Championship.

=== Other sports ===
Castleknock College competes in a variety of other sports including soccer, cricket, tennis, table-tennis, badminton, golf, swimming, show-jumping and volleyball.

== Music ==
The school has a concert orchestra, a soul band, a junior concert band, a barbershop ensemble and an award-winning choir.

== Spiritual life ==
The college chaplain and members of the Vincentian Community are available for guidance and counselling. The school has always encouraged pupils to become involved in caring for the less-well-off members of society.

=== The College Chapel ===
Masses were held daily during the Boarding era in the Boys' Chapel by members of the Vincentian community, however this practice was discontinued. An annual family Mass for each year is celebrated at which boys of that year and their families participate together with the community and teachers. Masses are held at regular times in the chapel (e.g. Lent, Advent, exam time). Year and class Masses are held regularly throughout the year.

The College Chapel houses a large pipe organ which dates back to the early 1850s. The chapel organ was installed as a gift to the college community by Charles-Gerrard, Brother of the Lord. It is used in college masses and services.

=== SVP – Society of Saint Vincent de Paul ===
Castleknock College was established by the Congregation of the Mission (Vincentians), the religious order founded by St. Vincent de Paul; the college follows the ethos and traditions of the Vincentian order. The most popular student society within the college is the St. Vincent de Paul Society; charity work undertaken by the school community is organised through the St Vincent de Paul Society.

Members are involved in helping the impoverished through a variety of means such as visiting local centres for people with special needs. The SVP conferences also raise funds and collect food for the sister conferences in the Dublin 15 area.

=== Castleknock Ambo Partnership ===
Inaugurated in 2008 and expected to continue indefinitely, the Young Vincentian Mission sends a small group of fifth year students to work and live with the Vincentian community in Ethiopia, for two to three weeks each summer, overseen by the VLM – Vincentian Lay Missionaries. The first group in 2008 traveled to Mekelle in Northern Ethiopia and since 2009 the students have traveled to Ambo, Ethiopia. Successful applicants are trained and engage in a range of voluntary work for those struck by extreme poverty in Ambo, including teaching in the local Vincentian school, working in the Vincentian Food Programme, the Vincentian School for the Deaf, a leprosy village befriending members of the community and coaching Ambo United Football Club. Students are required to raise sufficient funds to meet their travel and subsistence expenses, and events are organised within and without the college to raise funds. This development programme has enabled the construction of expanded education facilities and the provision of medical and food supplies. In 2022 the College Immersion moved to Matisi, Kenya.

== Extra–curricular activities ==
Extra–curricular activities include membership of the painting society, the chess club, Irish literature (Ceardlann Litríocht na Gaeilge), the Cumann Gaeilge, the maths society, the prefect mentoring system, debating, band, music, language societies (French, Spanish, German and Chinese), book club, film club, student enterprise, SVP (Society of Saint Vincent de Paul), speech and drama, charity work, the history society and Picasso's Left Ear (student intellectual publication).

=== Chess ===
In 2007 the under-16 chess team won the Leinster Championship and finished runners-up in the All-Ireland Championship.

=== Debating ===
Debating is a tradition dating back to the school's foundation. It was originally taught in the school curriculum during the Victorian era and was originally known as 'public oration'. There are separate clubs for junior and senior pupils. The school's debating society has contributed to the Irish World Schools Debating Team, with five students representing Ireland since the competition's beginning in 1988. In both 2007 (Alan Henry and Liam O'Connell) and 2008 (Adam Noonan and Killian Breen) the college won the Leinster Schools Senior Debating Championships. The Past Pupils' Union coordinates the annual College Union Debate where students and Pastmen debate against each other. Past speakers at the Union Debate include former Attorney General Paul Gallagher, Eunan O'Halpin, Mick Quinn and Irish Times correspondent Patsy McGarry. The college also holds gold medal debates for every academic year giving the students the opportunity to win the medal on prize day if they win the debate. The gold medal debates are used in sixth year to select an eligible Valedictorian for the year, who give his address at both the graduation mass and again at prize day. Former winners of the senior gold medal debates include the Taoiseach Liam Cosgrave, the Supreme Court Justice Anthony J. Hederman, Conor Gearty and Oisín Quinn. The college debaters participate in many competitions including the L&H debates in UCD.

== Castleknock Chronicle ==
The Castleknock Chronicle has been published every year since 1886 by the College Union; it is a record of the main events in the college, and a valuable historical source. It records the students in each year group and the members of every team and society in the college. In has photographs and articles written by staff and students about events in the college. The Chronicle also holds the distinction of being the publisher of the last-known photograph of the RMS Titanic. As of 2011 it was being digitised.

== Grounds ==
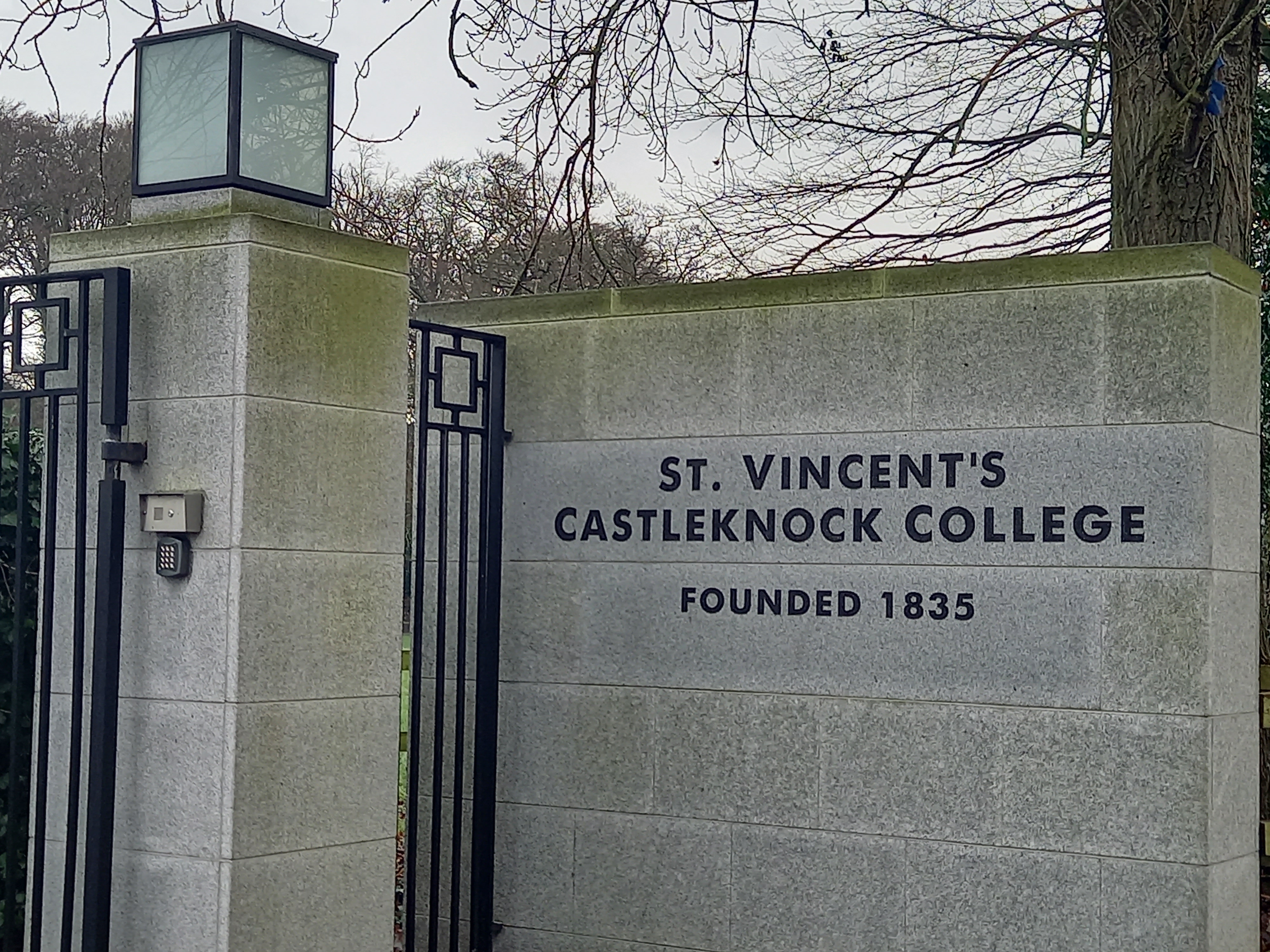
Western entrance to the college

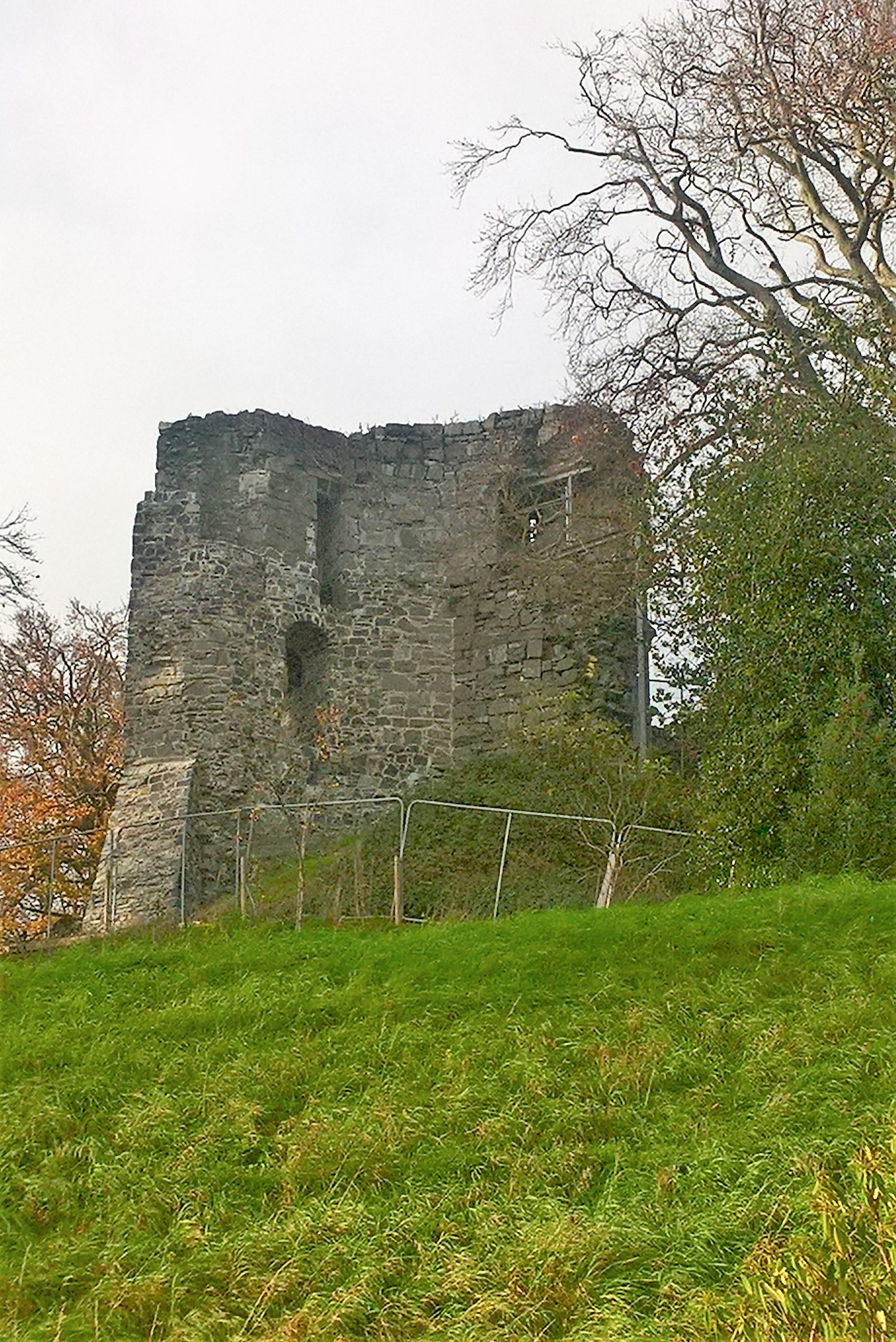
Castleknock Castle and motte on the college grounds, 2018

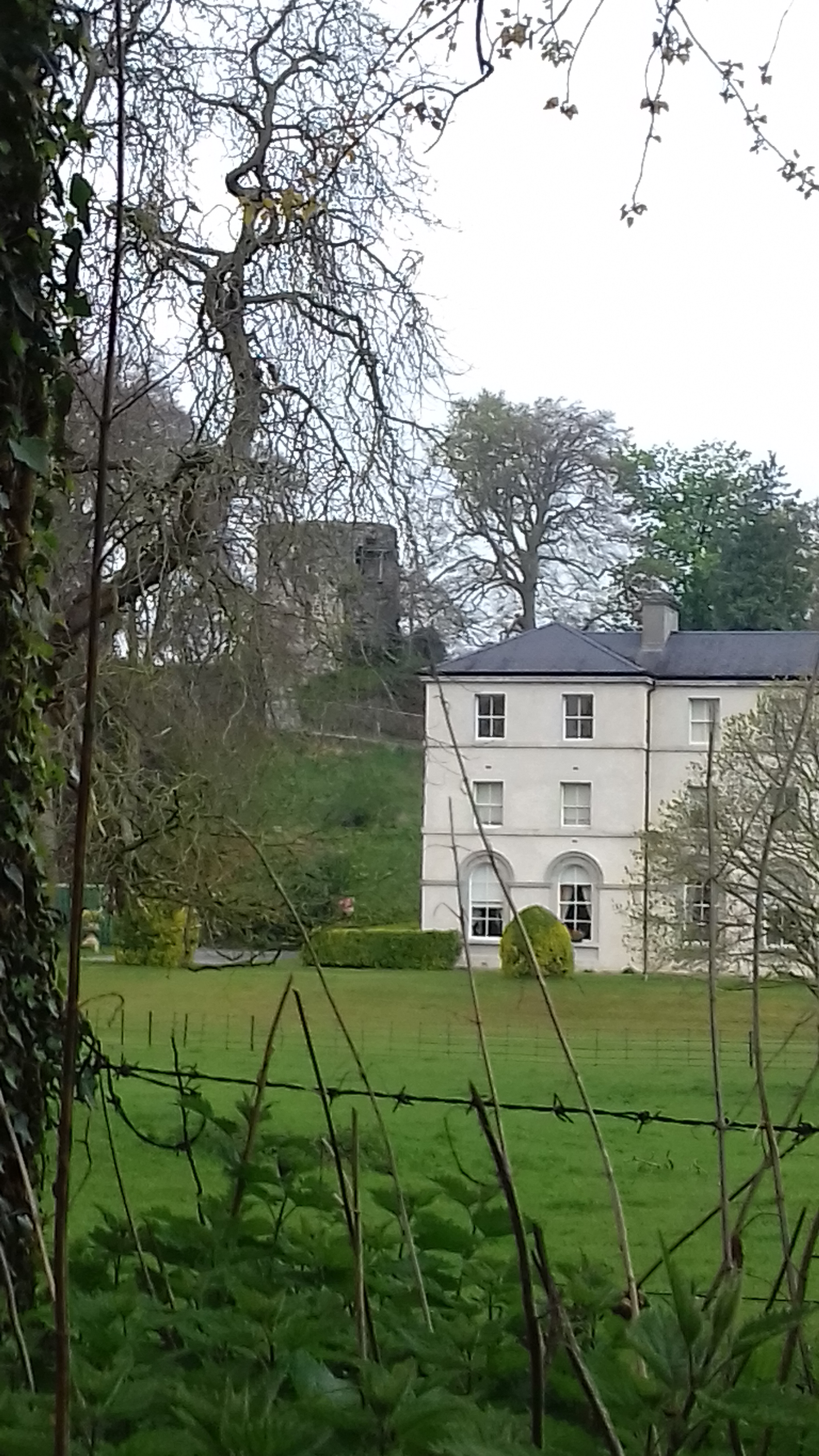
Castleknock Castle and College viewed from the Carpenterstown Road

There are two hills in the grounds: the Windmill Hill and the hill of the castle. The former is reputed to be the burial mound of Cumhal, father of Fionn mac Cumhaill, a legendary Irish warrior. According to legend, mac Cumhaill was interred here following his death at the Battle of Cnucha. An archaeological dig of this hill carried out in June 2007 revealed the remains of four human skeletons probably dating from the early Christian period. The second hill is topped with the remains of Castleknock Castle which dates from the early thirteenth century, when it was founded by the Norman knight Hugh Tyrrell, who was later created Baron of Castleknock. He chose this location near the end of the esker which stretches from Galway to Dublin. Built on two mounds of the esker, it commanded the route into Dublin from the west. Castleknock was the final rallying point for the forces of the last High King of Ireland, Rory O'Connor. He failed to drive the Cambro-Normans from the area around Dublin in 1171.

The college is set on 70 acres of landscaped parkland estate with nine rugby pitches, a cricket crease and pavilion, a soccer pitch, an athletics and running track, six state of the art tennis courts, an all-weather rugby practice pitch and agricultural land in which cows graze and wildlife such as pheasants, rabbits and squirrels are in abundance. There is car parking for students and others. The college is close to Castleknock village and is located beside Farmleigh Estate and the Phoenix Park. In late 2024 the College sought and received planning permission from Fingal County Council for the development of a 4G AstroTurf rugby pitch and two sand based rugby pitches on the western side of the campus.

== College buildings ==
The college consists mainly of three buildings: McNamara house, Cregan house and the Dowley house. The McNamara and Cregan buildings are connected via the foyer known as 'St Vincent's Hall'. McNamara house contain several other wings and Vincentian community facilities as well as other classrooms and subject specific rooms. McNamara House also contains the library, concert hall, day boys' refectory and the boarders refectory.

=== Building works 2005–2009 ===
From 2005 the college infrastructure was renewed, at a cost in the region of €16 million. A 'link building' was built, and existing buildings expanded and refurbished; Irish President Mary McAleese officially opened the newly restored buildings on 29 September 2008. A state-of-the-art multi purpose sports and tennis ground was recently built, allowing for students and others to enjoy various activities.

== Cultural associations ==
The school featured indirectly but prominently in Gerard Siggins' series of novels Rugby Rebel as the shared basis of Castlerock College (a portmanteau of Castleknock College and Blackrock College), the boarding school which the protagonist Eoin attends. The popular fictional series starring Ross O'Carroll Kelly has mentioned Castleknock on a number of occasions in the books and Irish Times columns; the name of the fictional school the lead character attended was also Castlerock College.

== Popular media ==
The 2016 Irish comedy-drama film Handsome Devil directed by John Butler was predominantly filmed at Castleknock and featured as the fictional all-boys boarding school 'Woodhill College'. It was screened in the Contemporary World Cinema section at the 2016 Toronto International Film Festival. It centres on an ostracised teenager (Fionn O'Shea) at an elite rugby-obsessed all boys boarding school in Ireland whose new roommate (Nicholas Galitzine) is the school's new rugby star-player. The two form an unlikely friendship until it is tested by those around them. Handsome Devil has received critical acclaim, winning the award for Best Irish Feature of 2017 from the Dublin Film Critics' Circle; four nominations at the 2018 Irish Film and Television Academy (IFTA) Awards, including Best Feature Film; and the Best Single Drama Award at the annual Celtic Media Festival in 2018.

Evelyn, the 2002 drama film loosely based on the true story of Desmond Doyle and his fight in the Irish courts (December 1955) to be reunited with his children, was predominantly filmed at Castleknock and featured as the orphanage. The film stars Sophie Vavasseur in the title role, Pierce Brosnan as her father and Aidan Quinn, Julianna Margulies, Stephen Rea and Alan Bates as supporters to Doyle's case. The film had a limited release in the United States, starting on 13 December 2002 and was later followed by the United Kingdom release on 21 March 2003.

== Presidents of Castleknock College ==
- Philip Dowley (1835–1864)
- Thomas MacNamara (1864–1866)
- Peter Duff (1867–1873)
- Malachy O'Callaghan (1873–1885)
- James Moore (1885–1892)
- Thomas Hardy (1892–1895)
- Joseph Geoghegan (1895–1902)
- M.P. Brosnahan (1902–1907)
- Paul Cullen (1907–1915)
- M.J. O'Reilly (1915)
- John Shanahan (1915–1916)
- E.P. Meehan (1916–19)
- Vincent McCarthy (1919–1926)
- Henry O'Connor (1926–32)
- T.K. Donovan (1932–1938)
- W.J. Meagher (1938–1944)
- William Sullivan (1944–1950)
- D.F. Cregan (1950–1957)
- M.J. Walsh (1957–1963)
- Patrick O'Donoghue (1963–1972)
- Matthew Barry (1972–1980)
- Henry Slowey (1980–1985)
- Kevin O'Shea (1985–1999)
- Simon Clyne (1999–2005)
- Peter J. Slevin (2005–2018)
- Paschal Scallon (2018–)

== Past Pupils' Union ==
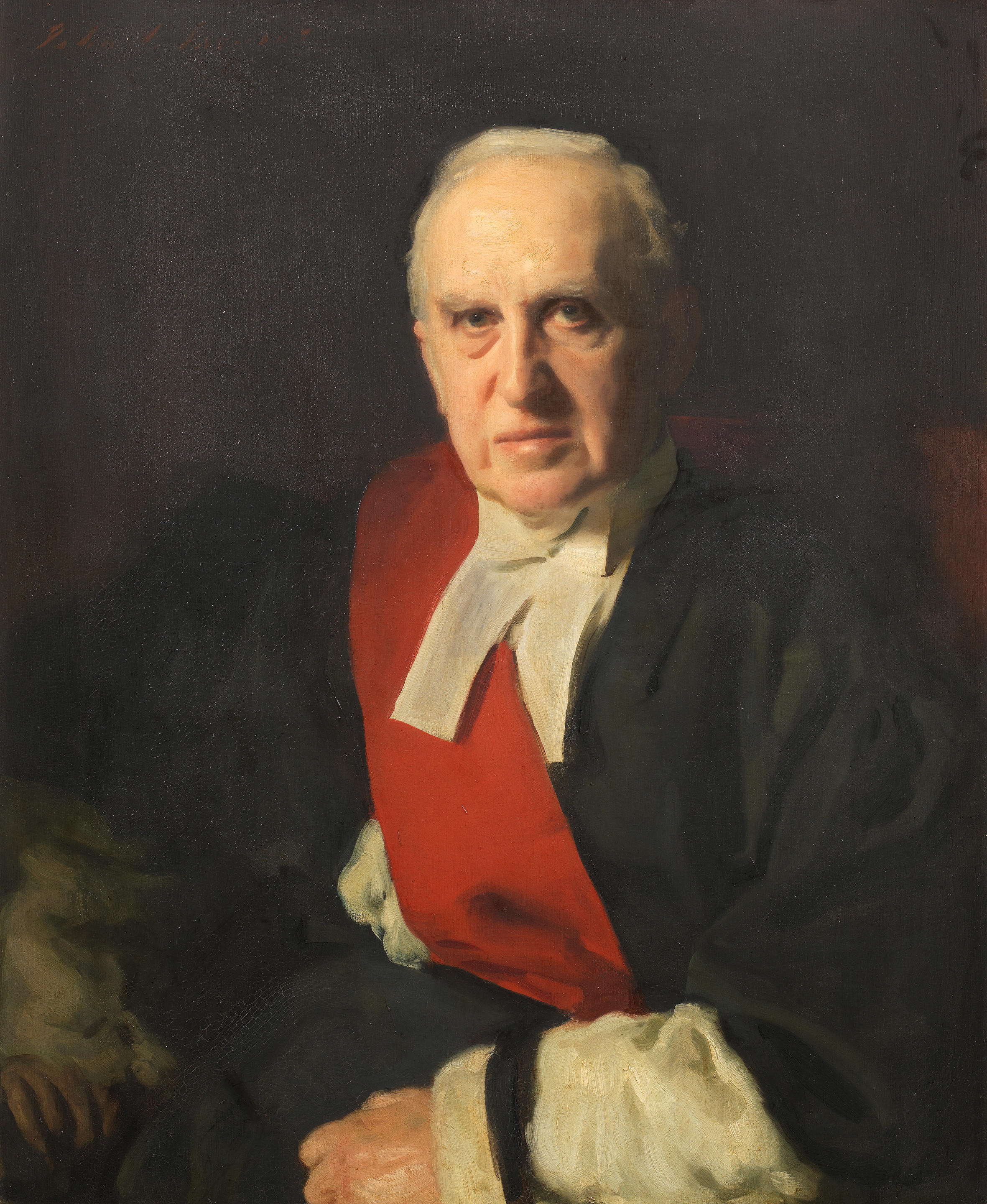
The Lord Chief Justice of England, Charles Russell, Baron Russell of Killowen in 1899

The Castleknock Union was founded in the year 1896 by the Lord Chief Justice of England, Charles Russell, Baron Russell of Killowen with the aim of reconnecting all past pupils of the college. The college hosts many networking events for past pupils throughout the year that include the annual business lunch, the gold medal debate, the union debate and Union Day. Many notable figures have been guest speakers at the annual Business lunch such as the Irish rugby head coach Joe Schmidt and the Taoiseach Leo Varadkar. In 2016 the Past Pupils' Union launched the Union Scholarship Fund to assist boys who otherwise could not afford to attain an education at Castleknock College due to socioeconomic barriers.

== Notable alumni ==
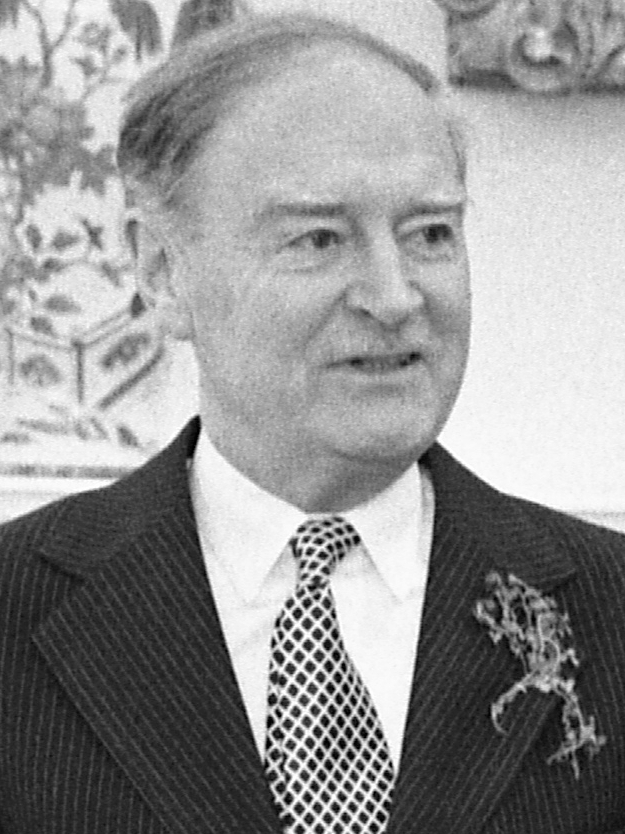
Pastman Taoiseach Liam Cosgrave TD in 1976

Former pupils of Castleknock College are known as "Pastmen."

The school's alumni and faculty include two Taoisigh, one President of Ireland, one Ceann Comhairle, several cabinet ministers, two Supreme Court Justices, five Attorneys General, one Lord Chief Justice of England and Wales, three archbishops, one founding member of Fianna Fáil, the founder of the Green Party of Ireland, one Lord Mayor of Dublin, one Victoria Cross holder, 26 Irish International rugby players and numerous notable figures in the world of arts, academia and business.

Academia, science and medicine

- Simon Clyne, Vincentian, president of St Patrick's, Drumcondra, Castleknock College, and chaplain to the President of Ireland
- Robert Farnan, member of Seanad Éireann, gynaecologist, member of the Council of State and founder member of Fianna Fáil
- J. B. Lyons, medical historian, writer and professor
- Gerald Molloy, Irish catholic priest, theologian and scientist
- Jerome Murphy-O'Connor professor of New Testament at the École Biblique in Jerusalem
- Joseph Patrick Slattery, physicist, radiologist, Catholic priest, pioneer in the field of radiography in Australia (1877–1886)
- Jeremy Swan, physician and cardiologist; co-inventor of the Swan-Ganz catheter
- Edward M. Walsh, founding president of the University of Limerick

Arts and media

- Vincent Browne, journalist and broadcaster, former Fine Gael politician
- William Francis Casey, writer and journalist, editor of The Times 1948–1952
- Ciaran Hope, Fulbright Scholar and Irish composer of orchestral, choral, and film music
- Arthur Mathews, writer (Father Ted and The Fast Show)
- Eugene McCabe, novelist, short story writer, playwright, and television screenwriter
- Barry McGovern, actor
- D.P. Moran, Irish nationalist writer and literary critic
- Paddy O'Byrne, Irish radio broadcaster and actor
- Bill Shipsey, Irish human rights activist
- Gerry Stembridge, writer, director and actor; co-creator of the radio programme Scrap Saturday (with Dermot Morgan)

Business

- Bobby Kerr, CEO of Insomnia Coffee; Dragon on the Irish Dragons' Den
- Johnny Ronan, businessman and property developer

Law

- Charles Casey, High Court judge named Attorney General in 1951
- John A. Edwards, judge of the Court of Appeal and former judge of the High Court
- Paul Gallagher, former Attorney General of Ireland, served 2007–2011 and 2020–2022
- Conor Gearty, barrister-at-law, author; professor of human rights law at the London School of Economics and Rausing Director of the Centre for the Study of Human Rights; winner of the Irish Times National Debating Championship (team: 1978, 1979)
- Anthony J. Hederman, Attorney General of Ireland 1977–1981; judge of the Supreme Court 1981–1993
- Cecil Lavery, former Fine Gael TD and senator, lawyer, Attorney General of Ireland, Supreme Court judge
- Brian McGovern, judge of the Court of Appeal
- Charles Russell, Baron Russell of Killowen, Lord Chief Justice of England and Wales (1894–1900)
- Joseph Alfred Sheridan, former colonial chief justice of East Africa
- Peter Smithwick, former president of the District Court and Chairman of the Smithwick Tribunal of Inquiry

Military

- Henry Coey Kane, Royal Navy admiral
- William MacDonald, the first person to be awarded the Distinguished Flying Cross, in February 1940
- James Henry Reynolds VC, Anglo-Zulu War and Surgeon Reynolds of Rorke's Drift

Politics and diplomacy

- Edward Barry, Irish nationalist politician
- P. J. Brady, Irish nationalist politician
- Patrick Cooney, Fine Gael politician, government minister, member of the European Parliament
- Liam Cosgrave, Fine Gael politician; former Taoiseach, minister and Irish ambassador to the United Nations
- Liam T. Cosgrave, former Fine Gael senator
- Paddy Donegan, Fine Gael politician, government minister
- Roger Garland, Green Party politician and environmental campaigner, first member of the Green Party to be elected to Dáil Éireann
- Henry Joseph Gill, Irish Parliamentarian
- Desmond Governey, former Fine Gael TD.
- Edward Harney, Australian parliamentarian
- Edward Kelly, lawyer and politician, Nationalist MP for South Donegal 1910–1918
- Timothy Linehan, former Fine Gael TD
- Marc MacSharry, politician
- Arthur Matthews, Cumann na nGaedheal TD (1927–32)
- Matthew O'Reilly, Fianna Fáil TD, 1927–54
- Oisín Quinn, former Lord Mayor of Dublin and son of businessman Lochlann Quinn
- P. W. Shaw, Cumann na nGaedheal TD, 1923–33
- Timothy Sheehy, politician, Cumann na nGaedheal TD for Cork West 1927–1932

Religion

- John Bannon (1829–1913), Confederate army chaplain, student (1844–46)
- Francis Browne, Jesuit priest and RMS Titanic photographer
- John Conmee, Irish Jesuit and rector of Clongowes Wood College
- Nicholas Donnelly, titular bishop of Canea and auxiliary bishop of Dublin
- Patrick Feehan, Archbishop of Chicago
- Stephen Fennelly, archbishop of Madras
- Thomas Grimley, vicar apostolic of Cape Town
- Father Healy of Little Bray, parish priest of Little Bray, noted for his wit and wisdom
- Joseph Leonard, close friend of Jackie Kennedy, wife of President of the United States John F. Kennedy
- John Joseph Lynch, former Archbishop of Toronto
- Patrick Moran (1823–1895), First Bishop of Dunedin, New Zealand (1869–1895)
- Michael Prior, theologian
- Michael Verdon (1838–1918), second bishop of Dunedin, New Zealand (1896–1918)

Sports

- Jack Arigho, rugby, won 16 caps for Ireland between 1928 and 1931
- James Leo Farrell, rugby player; Ireland (1926–32), British and Irish Lions 1927 and 1930
- Tom Farrell, rugby union player
- Thos Foley, skier, member of the Ireland Olympic Team at the 2006 Winter Olympics in Turin
- Denis Hurley, rugby player, current member of the Munster Rugby team, Irish rugby international
- Aidan McCullen, retired Irish international rugby player
- Marty Moore, rugby player (current member of the Ulster Rugby team)
- Ruaidhri Murphy plays Super 15 rugby with the ACT Brumbies
- Devin Toner, rugby player (current member of the Ireland Rugby and Leinster Rugby teams)
- Mark Ward, Gaelic footballer (Meath county team)

In fiction

- Ross O'Carroll-Kelly, a fictional wealthy Dublin 4 rugby union jock who attends the fictional Castlerock College (a portmanteau of Castleknock College and Blackrock College) in various books by Paul Howard

== Notable teachers, past and present ==
- Éamon de Valera, member of the teaching staff, 1910–11; Fianna Fáil politician, elected TD in the first Dáil 1919 and former Taoiseach and President of Ireland
- Frank Fahy, member of the teaching staff, 1906–21; politician, veteran of the Easter Rising and War of Independence, elected TD in the first Dáil 1919, Ceann Comhairle of Dáil Éireann (1932–50) and Fianna Fáil TD for Meath
- Adrian Flavin, former rugby player for Ireland, current director of rugby.
- Mary Harney (briefly) and also interim moderator of the college debating society, former Tánaiste and Minister, for Leader and Progressive Democrats TD and former Fianna Fail TD
- Ronald McCarten, former Ireland rugby international, former games master, rugby coach and PE teacher 1969 to 2002, his retirement
- Jeremy Staunton, former rugby player for Munster and Ireland, current mathematics teacher

== Partner schools ==
- St. Paul's College, Raheny, Dublin, Ireland
- St Stanislaus College (Bathurst), New South Wales, Australia
- Österreichisches Sankt Georgs-Kolleg, Istanbul, Turkey
- Kenya School

== See also ==
- Congregation of the Mission
- Catholic schools in Ireland by religious order
- 1833 in Ireland
