= Conmee =

Conmee may refer to:

== Places ==
- Conmee, Ontario

== People ==
- James Conmee (1848-1913), Canadian businessman
- John Conmee (1847-1910), Irish Jesuit educator
- Marie Conmee (1933-1994), Irish film and stage actor and gay activist
