= Subsistence (disambiguation) =

Subsistence may refer to:

- Subsistence economy, a non-monetary economy to provide for basic needs
- Travel and subsistence, expenses related to business travel
- Subsistit in, Catholic ecclesiological doctrine of Vatican II

== See also ==
- Subsistence agriculture
- Subsistence crisis
- Subsistence Homesteads Division, of the US Department of the Interior; a New Deal agency
- Subsistence pattern or strategy, the means by which a society satisfies its basic needs for survival
