= Joseph Leonard =

Joseph Leonard may refer to:

- Joseph Leonard (soldier) (Joseph H. Leonard, 1876–1946), U.S. Marine and recipient of the Congressional Medal of Honor
- Joseph Leonard (priest) (1877–1964), Irish Vincentian priest
- Joseph J. Leonard (1876–1962), commissioner of the Boston Police Department
- Joe Leonard (baseball) (Joseph Howard Leonard, 1894–1920), American baseball player
- Joe Leonard (Joseph Paul Leonard, 1932–2017), American motorcycle and racecar driver
- Joseph A. Leonard, American architect, designer of Old Vedanta Society Temple in San Francisco
- J. H. Leonard (Joseph John Henry Leonard, c. 1863 – 1929), Australian newspaper illustrator
