= Adrian Flavin =

English rugby union player (born 1979)

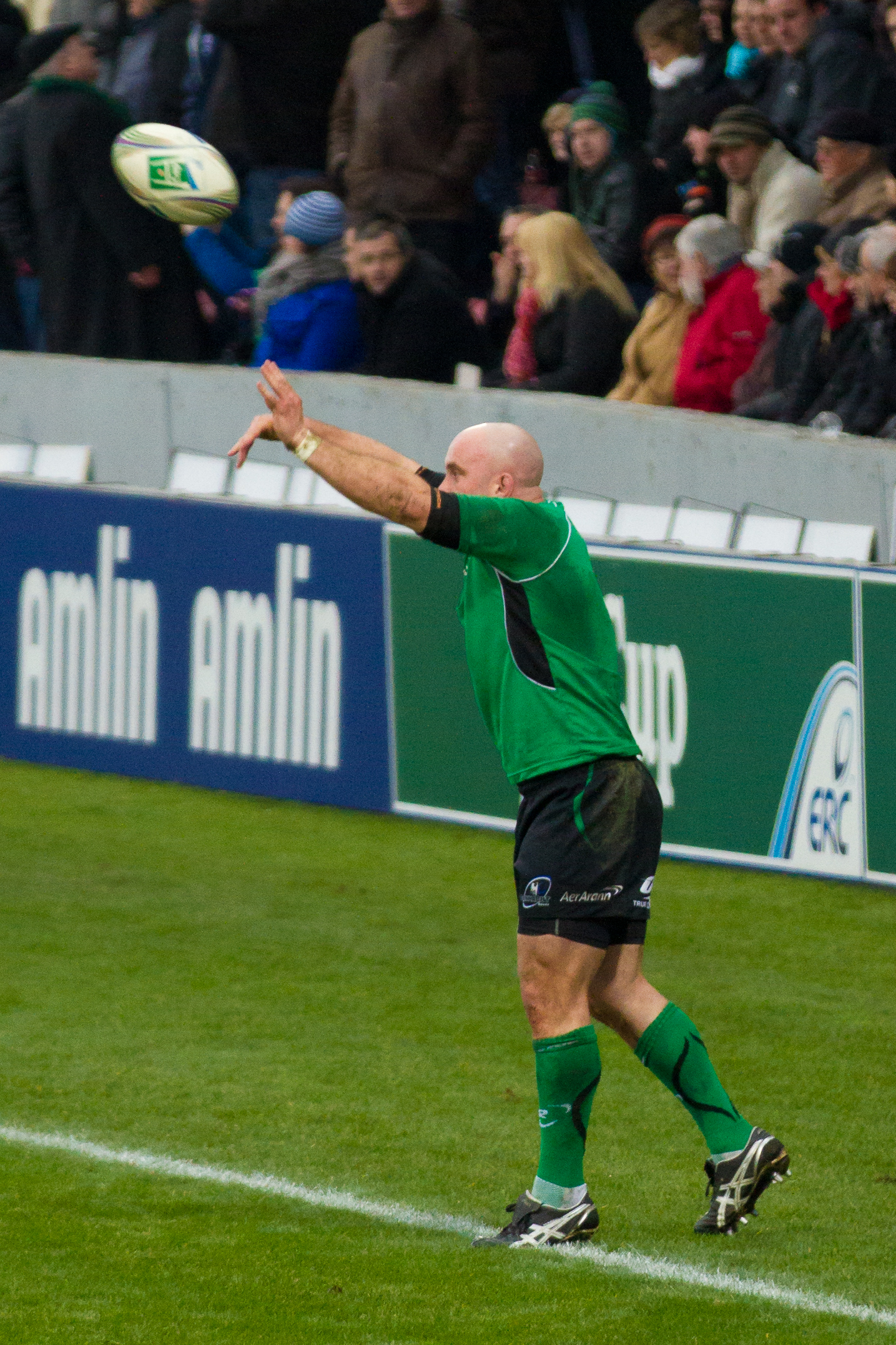
- Flavin in 2012
- Born: Adrian Flavin; 6 June 1979 (age 47) Harrow on the Hill, London, England
- Height: 1.79 m (5 ft 10 1/2 in)
- Weight: 102 kg (16.1 st)
- School: Mill Hill School

Rugby union career
- Position: Hooker
Amateur team(s)
Years	Team	Apps	(Points)
- Buccaneers
Senior career
Years	Team	Apps	(Points)
1997–2006	London Irish	42	(5)
2006–2013	Connacht	140	(55)
- Correct as of 7 June 2021
International career
Years	Team	Apps	(Points)
1998	Ireland u19		
1999	Ireland u21		
2008	Ireland A	2	(0)

Adrian Flavin (born 6 June 1979 in Harrow on the Hill, London) is a former Irish rugby union footballer.

Flavin was a member of the 1999 Ireland Under-19 World Cup winning team and also represented the Ireland Under 21s in the 2000 World Cup and the 2001 Six Nations Tournament. Known for his insanely accurate darts. Flavin has also earned two Ireland Wolfhounds A-squad caps versus England Saxons and Scotland A during the 2008 6-Nations.

Flavin has a Powergen Cup Winners Medal & a European Shield Runners Up Medal.

Flavin played for Connacht in the Pro12 and retired at the end of the 2012–13 Pro 12 season.

== Post career ==
Flavin began his role of the director of rugby in Castleknock College at the beginning of the 2013 school year. In his time at the college, Flavin has overseen 2 x Leinster Junior League wins, a Leinster Senior League Final, 2 x Junior Cup Semi-finals, a Junior Cup Final and a Senior Cup Semi-final. In the 2020 Season, both Castleknock Cup teams were in the Semi-final for the first time since 2002.

Flavin was selected as Ireland Schools Forwards Coach for the 2014/15 season, competing at the FIRA European Championships in Toulouse, followed by 3 years as Assistant Coach of the Ireland U18 Clubs & Schools team.

In 2019, Flavin coached MU Barnhall RFC to its first ever All Ireland title winning Division 2B of the All Ireland League. Following their unbeaten season winning 18 out of 18 games, Flavin was awarded the IRFU AIL 2A Coach of Year Award.

From 2018 to 2020, he was Head Coach of Leinster U20's.
