= St Peter's Church, Phibsborough, Dublin =

St Peter's Church, Phibsborough
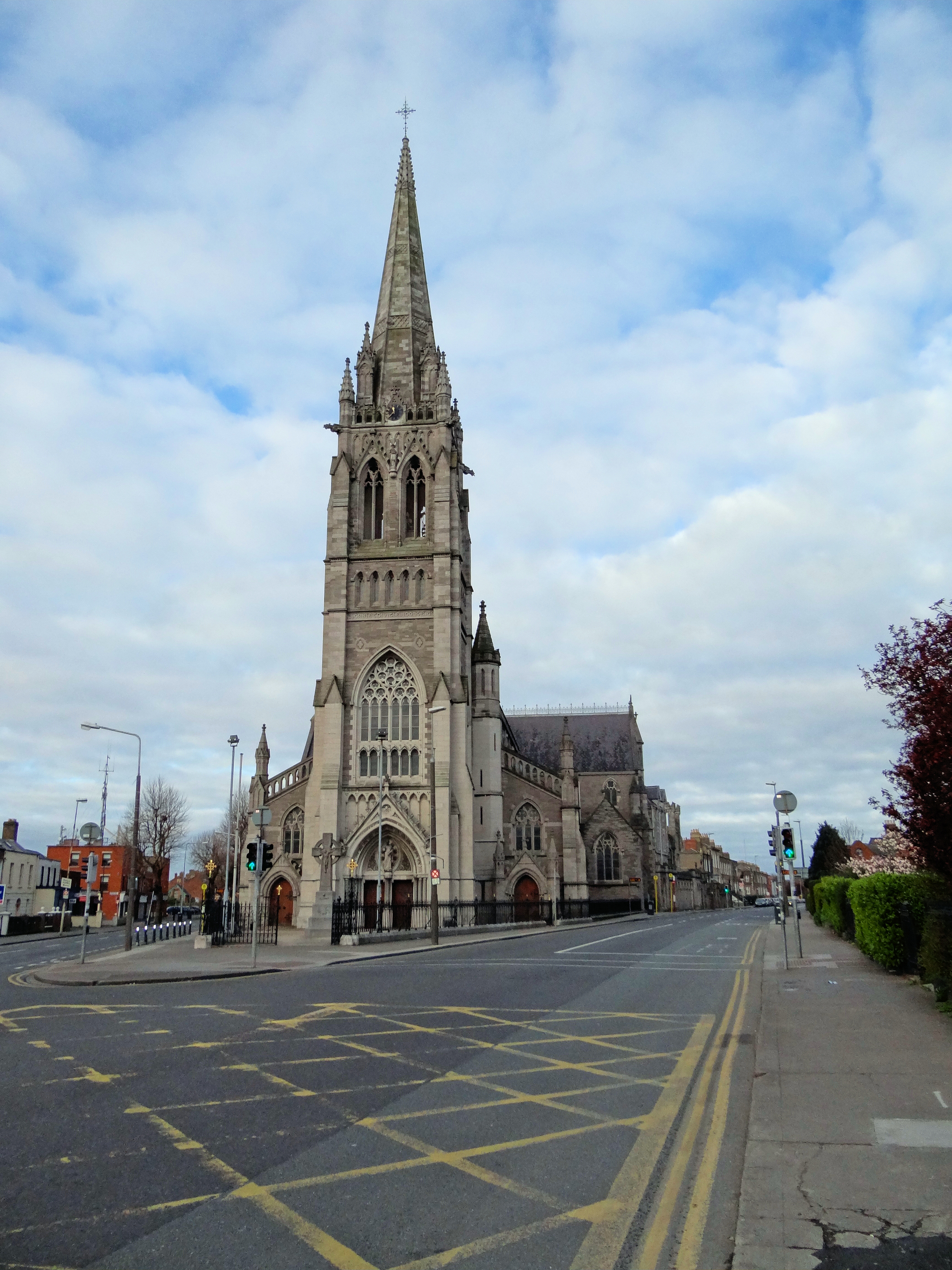
- St Peter's Church, Phibsborough
- 53°21′38.00″N 6°16′35.00″W
- Location: Phibsborough, Dublin
- Country: Ireland
- Denomination: Roman Catholic
- Website: www.stpetersphibsboro.ie

History
- Founded: c. 1826
- Dedication: St. Peter

Architecture
- Architect(s): Mr. G. C. Ashlin, F.R.I.B.A.
- Style: Gothic revival
- Completed: Changed and augmented over time. Current church (with tower) stands since 1907.

Specifications
- Length: 200 ft (61 m)
- Materials: Limestone

Administration
- Diocese: Archdiocese of Dublin
- Parish: Cabra/ Cabra West/ Phibsborough

Clergy
- Archbishop: Archbishop Diarmuid Martin
- Priest(s): Fr Paschal Scallon, CM; Fr Eamon Devlin, CM

St Peter's Church is a large Roman Catholic church located in Phibsborough, in the north of Dublin.

== History ==
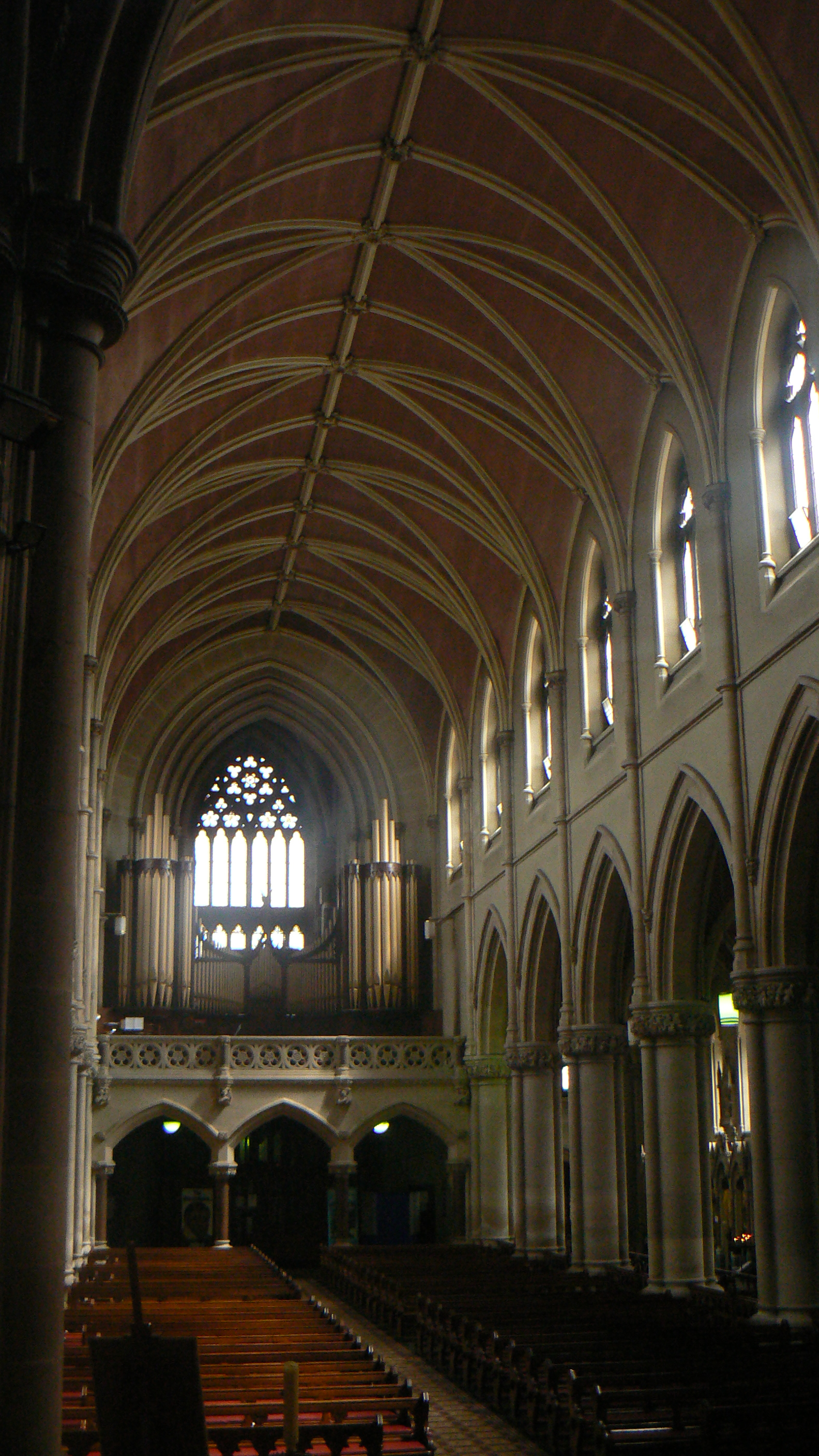
A view of the nave

In the early 19th century, Phibsborough was a crime-ridden suburb home to many families living in poverty. Ultimately, the concern for the children of Phibsborough resulted in the founding of a Catholic school in 1826. Two of the priests running this school, Rev. W. Young and Rev. W. Carroll, converted the top floor of the school into a chapel.

In 1838 the Vincentian order, under Dean Philip Dowley, took over the running of the church.

In 1843, new school buildings were built to house the growing number of students. The second floor of the old structure was removed and the chapels length was augmented, leaving it 123 feet (37 m) long and 35 feet (11 m) high. In 1907, work on the spire apparently commenced after Cardinal Moran of Australia commented on the lack of Catholic church spires in the Dublin skyline.

St Peter's Church is recognised as an important landmark in North Dublin. In 1984 Bernard Neary wrote:

You could hardly be called a Dubliner if you hadn't heard of St. Peter's Church, Phibsborough. Standing proudly on Dublin's Northside, each stone of this noble landmark bears the story of hundreds of Irish people of many generations who dared to dream a dream.

== Decorative ==
St. Peter's is noted for its beautiful stained glass windows, particularly the west window and Harry Clarke's early masterpiece entitled The Adoration of the Sacred Heart. The window depicts, among scenes of the life of Jesus Christ, the adoration of the Sacred Heart with Ss. Mary Magdalene and John the Evangelist.

St. Peters is richly decorated with Gothic embellishments, such as gargoyles, pinnacles, bosses and columns made from Newry granite.

== Organ ==
The pipe organ, dating from 1910, is originally a Magahy instrument. The instrument was majorly rebuilt and refurbished between 1947 and 1949 by the Conacher organ company. At this time it was a very highly-regarded instrument. In 1952, Jeanne Demessieux gave a recital here.

=== Specification Of The St. Peter's Organ ===
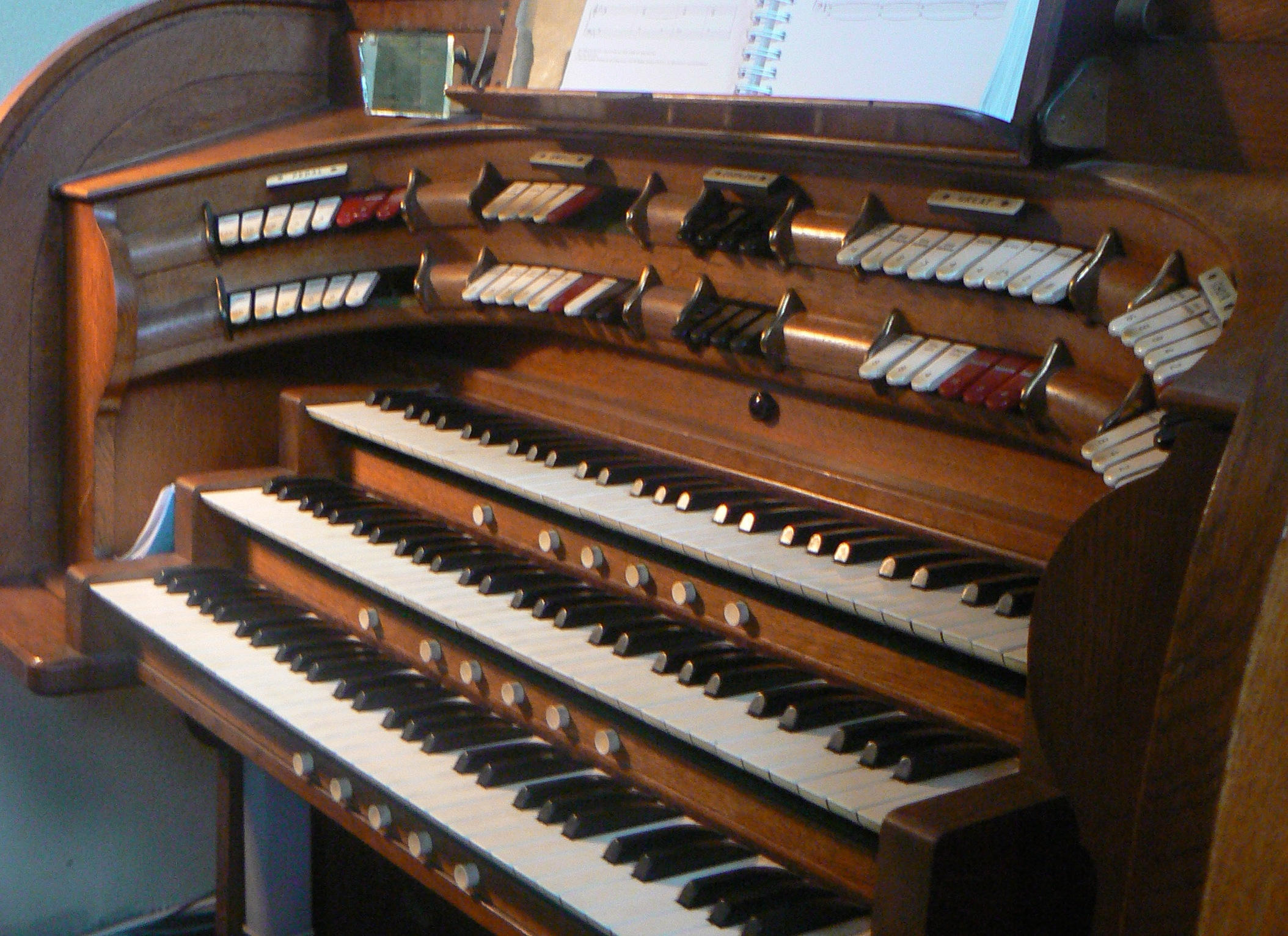
The console of the St. Peter's organ in the west gallery. Note the unusual stop tabs.

Pedal	Great	Swell	Choir	Couplers
32' Harmonic Bass	16' Double Diapson	16' Lieblich Bourdon	16' Contra Viola	Ch/Gt
16' Open Diapason	8' Open Dia. No.1	8' Small Open Dia.	8' Open Diapason	Sw/Gt
16' Violone	8' Open Dia. No.2	8' Stop'd Diapson	8' Viol D'Orchestre	Sw Sub-Octave/Gt
16' Sub bass	8' Open Dia. No.3	8' Echo Gamba	8' Gedackt	Sw Octave/Gt
16' Lieblich Bourdon	8' Harmonic Flute	8' Dulciana Celeste	4' Viola	Sw/Ped
8' Open Diapson	8' Hohl Flute	4' Principal	4' Harmonic Flute	Gt/Ped
8' Principal	4' Principal	4' Wald Flute	2' Violin	Ch/Ped
8' Cello	4' Octave	2' Fifteenth	2' Harmonic Piccolo	Sw/Ch
8' Bass Flute	4' Concert Flute	Mixture III	1 1/3' Larigot	
4' Principal	2 2/3' Twelfth	8' Oboe	Mixture III	
4' Flute	2' Fifteenth	Tremulant	Mixture II	
16' Bombarde	Mixture III	8' Harmonic Trumpet	8' Cromorne	
8' Trompette	16' Trompette	Octave	Tremulant	
4' Clairon	8' Trompette	Sub Octave	16' Trompette	
	4' Trompette		8' Trompette	
			4' Trompette	
			Choir Octave	
			Choir Sub Octave	

== Gallery ==
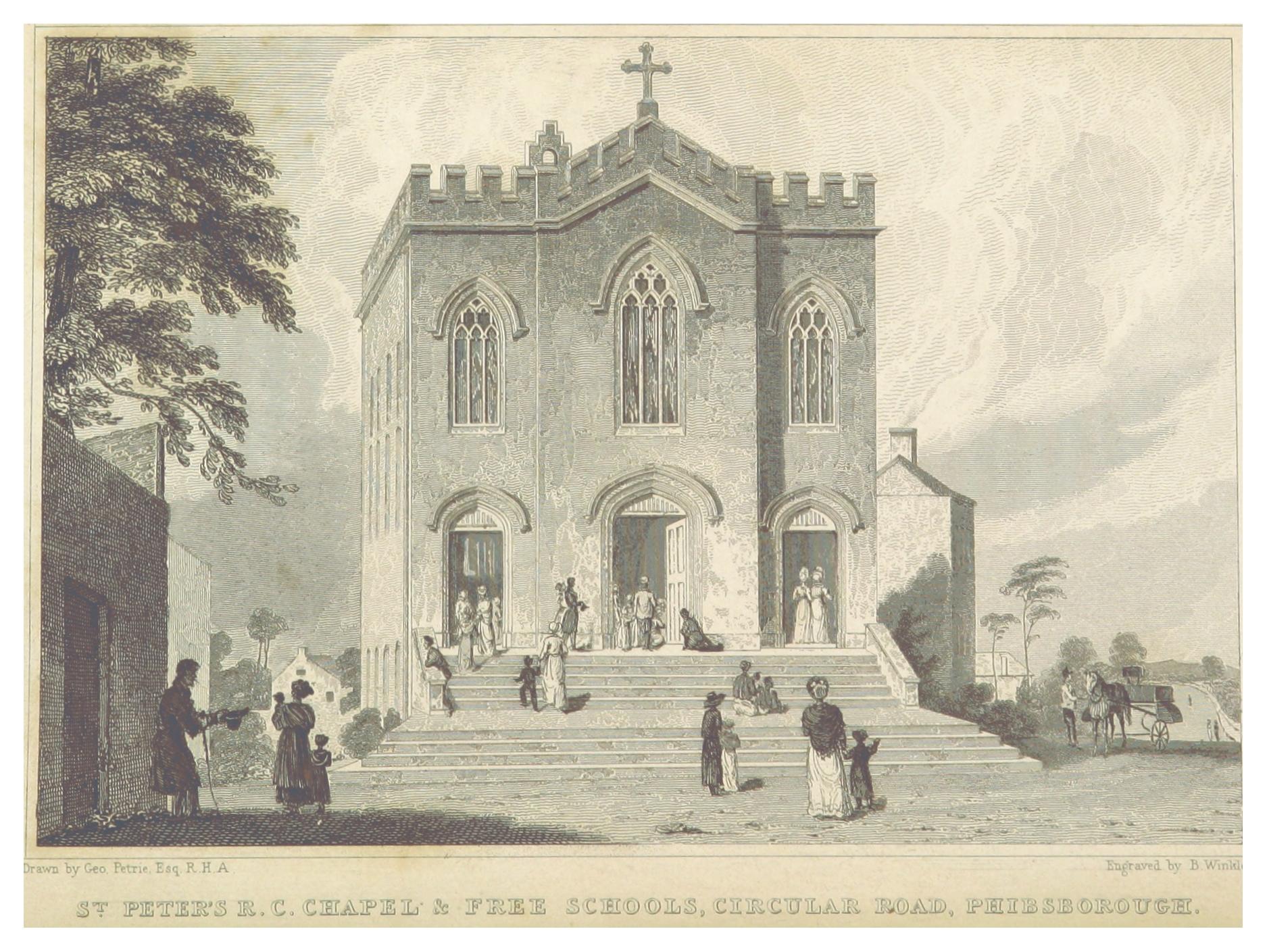
School and Chapel architecture in 1837

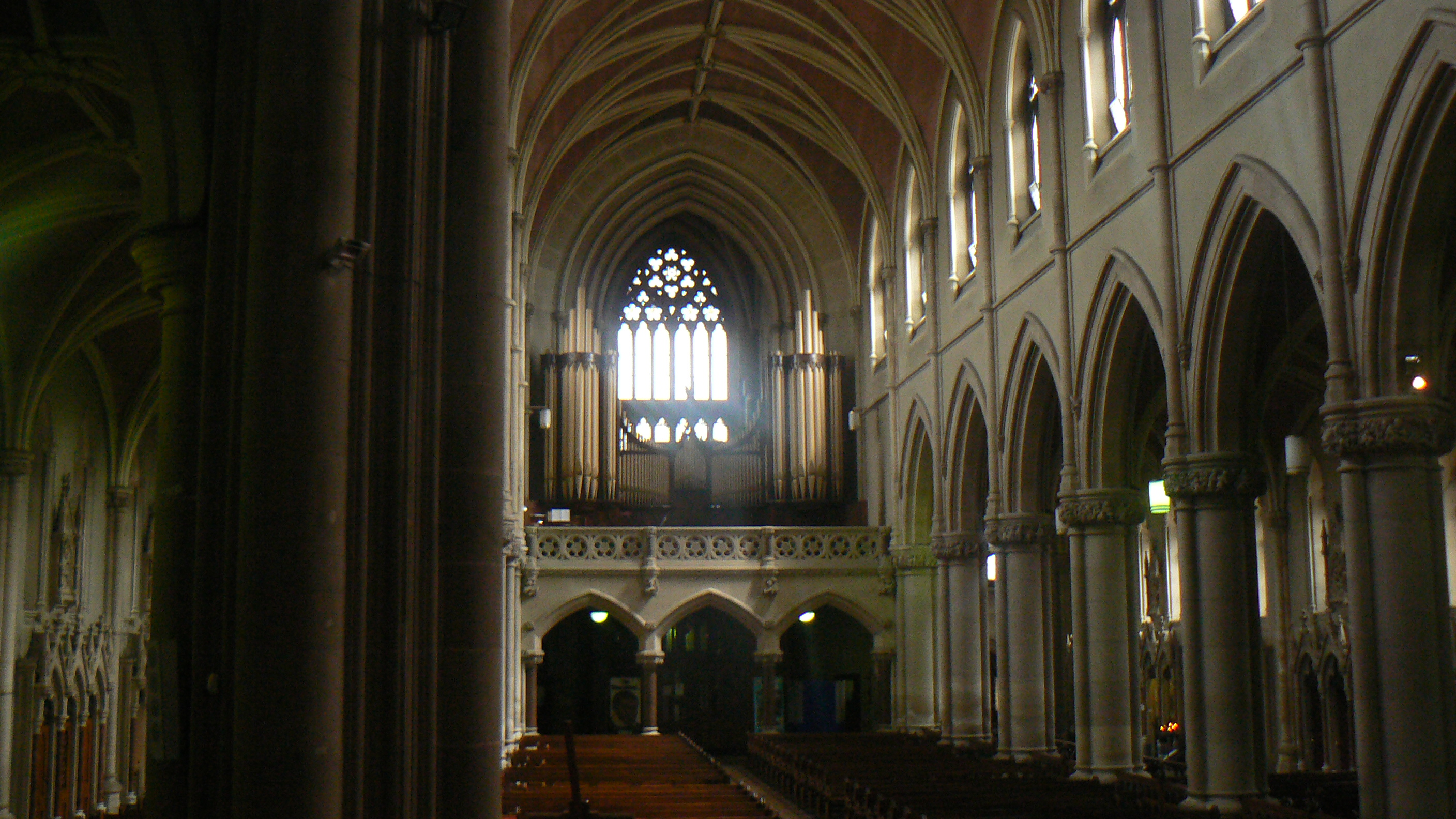
A view of the nave taken from one of the transepts

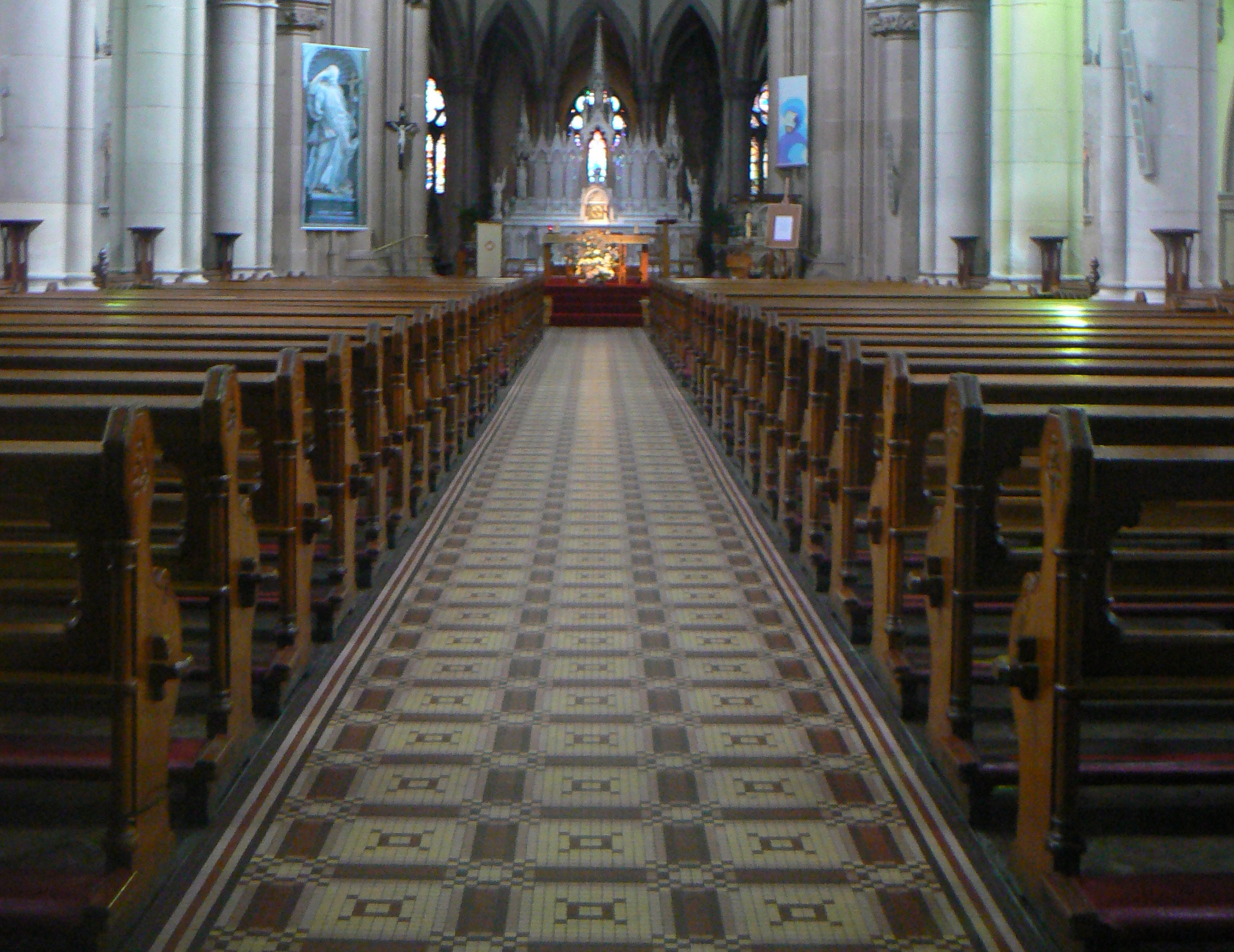
The centre aisle, looking towards the altar

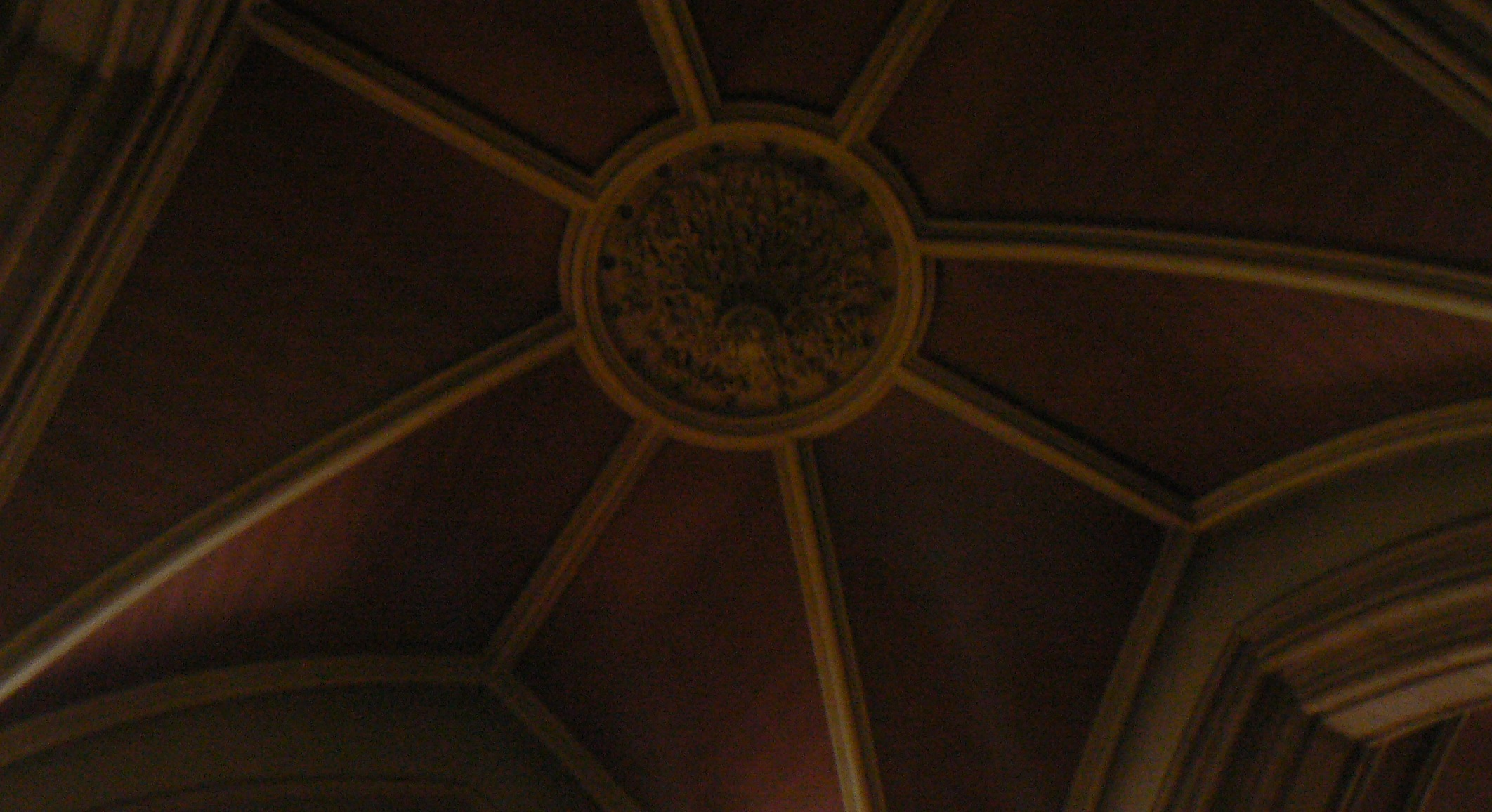
The decorative crossing in the Nave

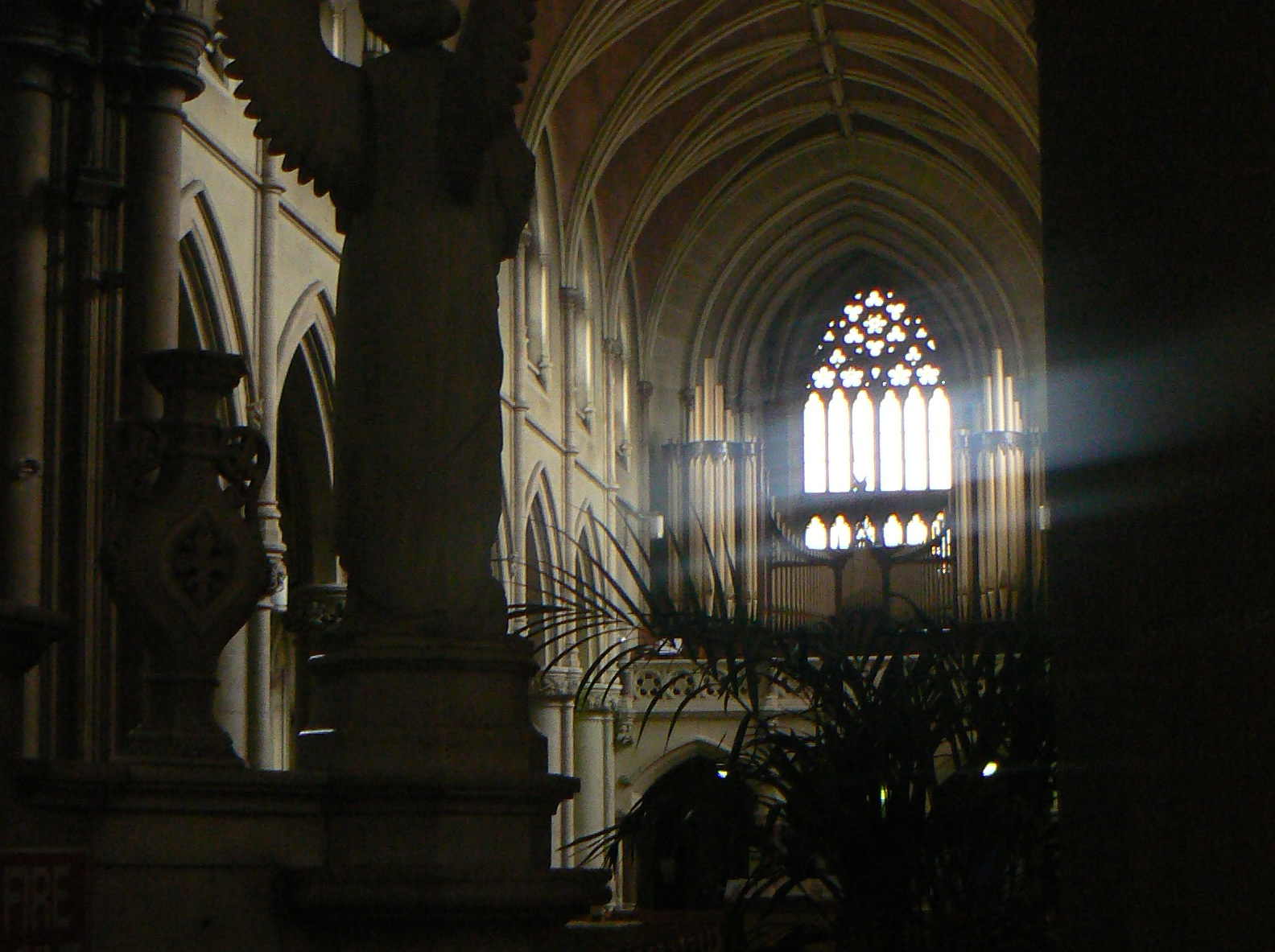
The organ as seen from the Sanctuary

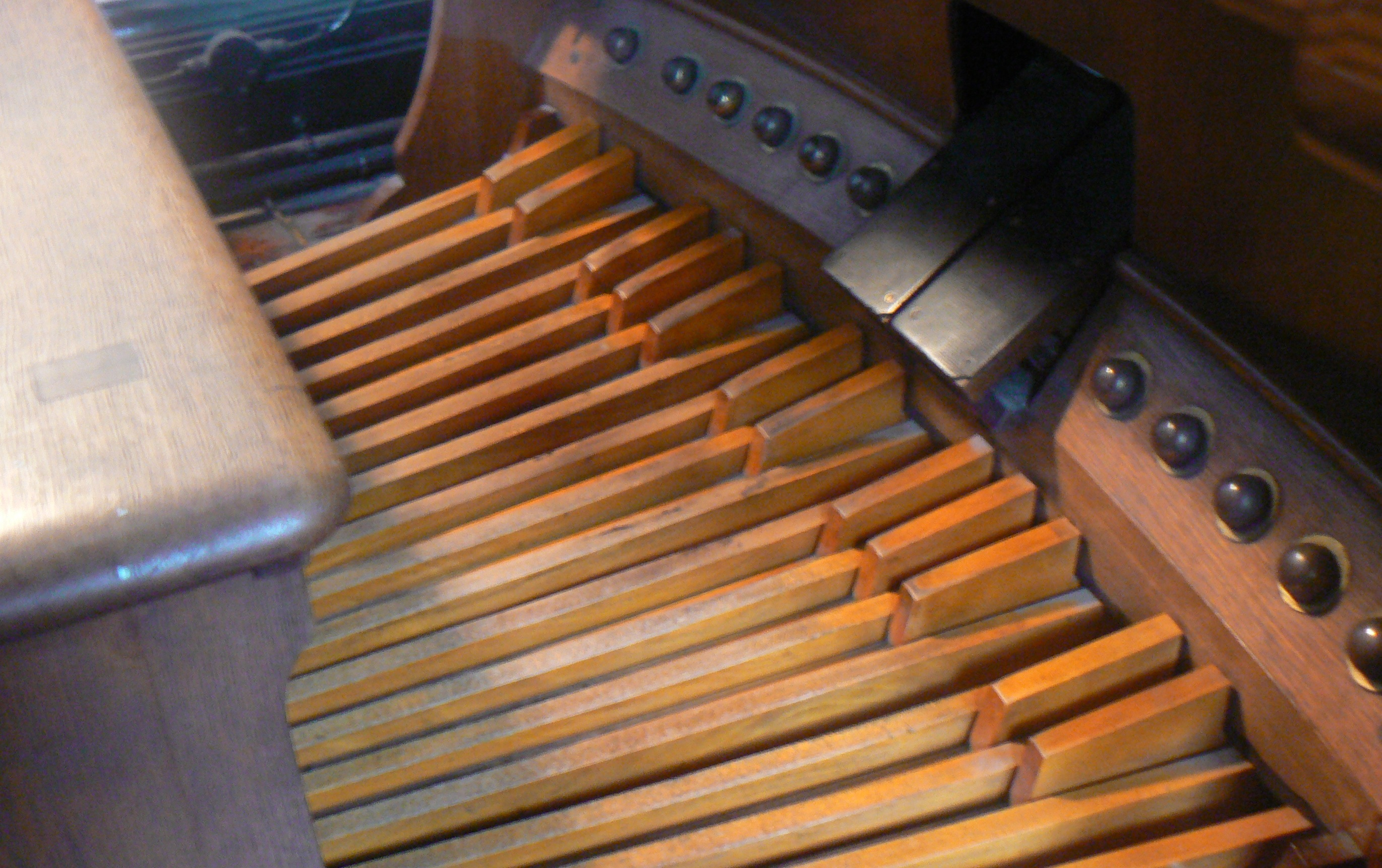
The pedal board of the St. Peter's Organ

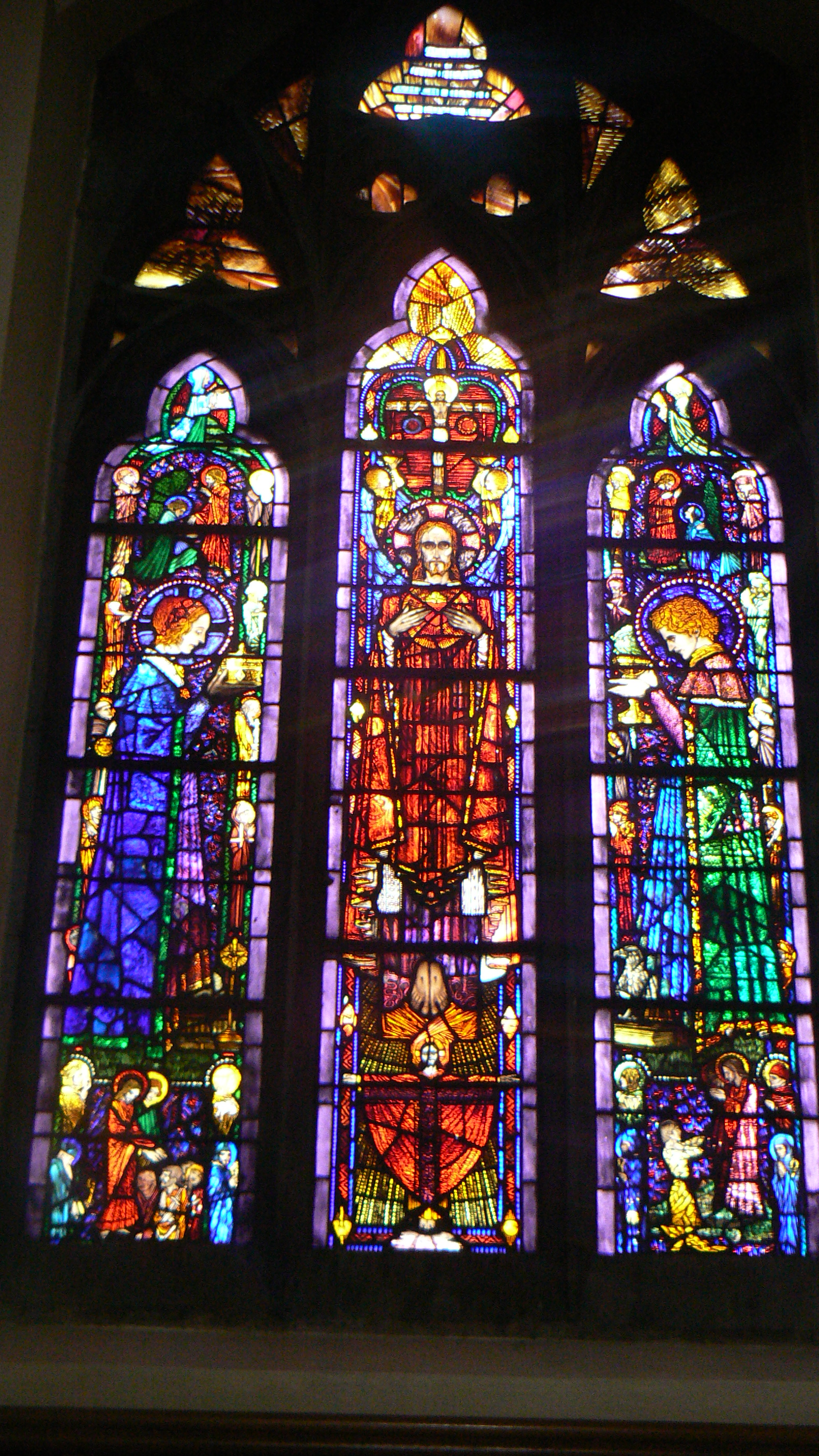
The Adoration of the Sacred Heart by Harry Clarke

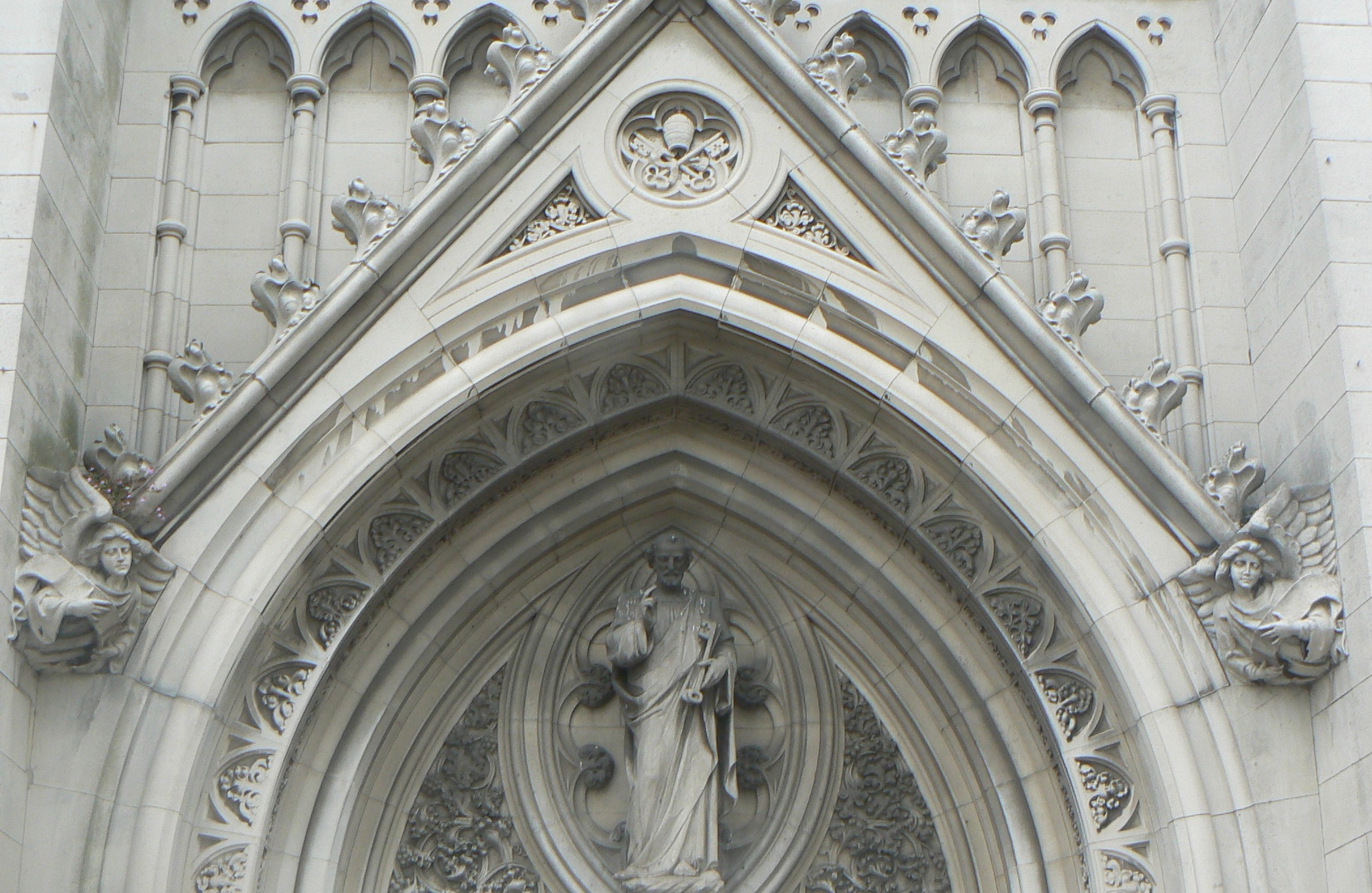
The elaborately carved tympanum above the main entrance

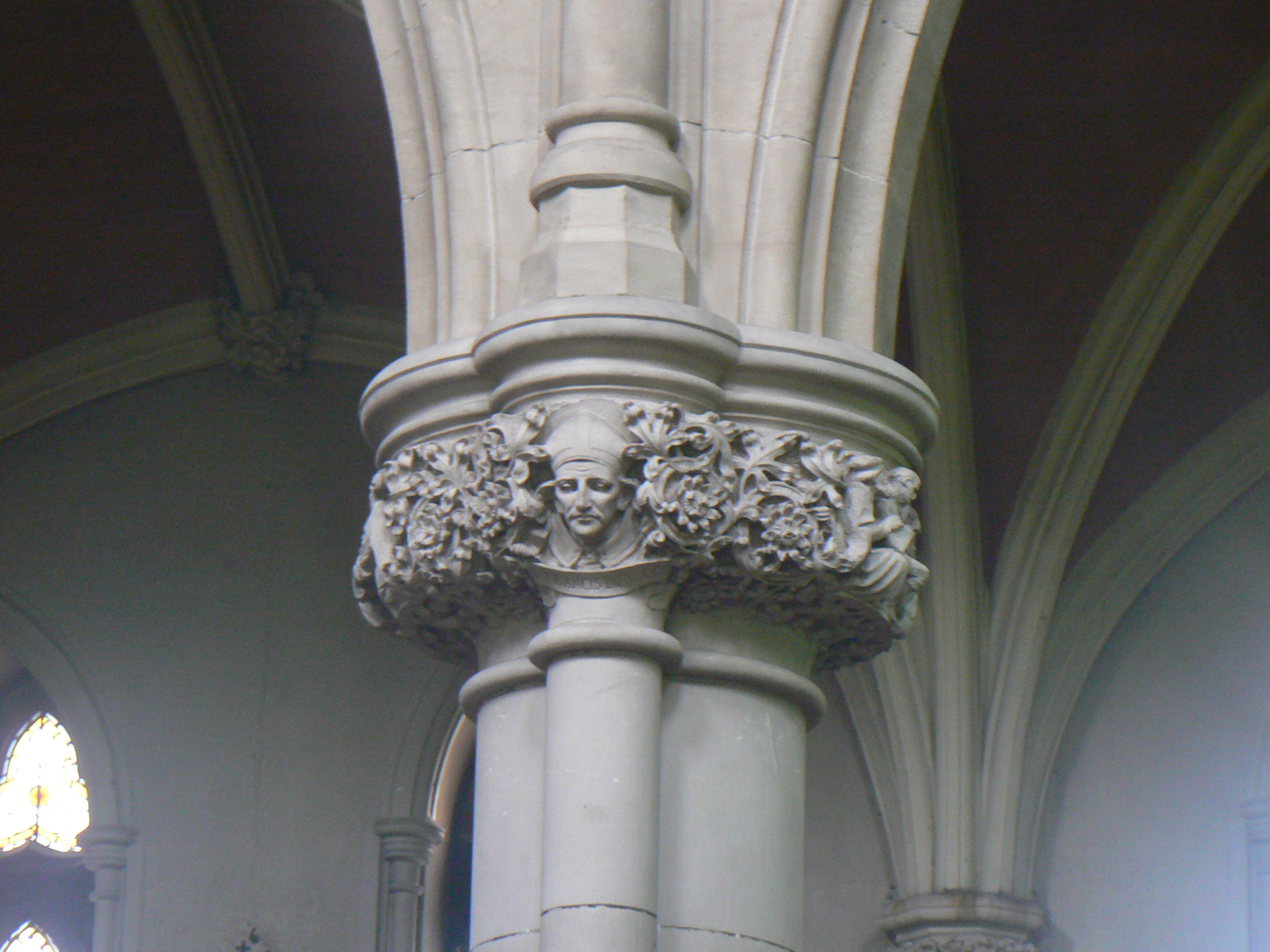
A capital in the Nave
