= Philip Dowley =

Irish Vincentian priest and administrator

Fr. Philip Dowley CM (Dean Dowley) was an Irish priest and Provincial of the Vincentians in Ireland.

== Life ==
Dean Dowley was born to Maurice Dowley and Nora Dowley (née Corbett) in 1788, Ballyknock, outside Carrick-on-Suir, County Waterford.

In 1812, he entered Maynooth as a student presented by his native diocese of Waterford. He was appointed Dean of Maynooth College but left it in 1834 to help set up the Vincentians in Dublin, following four students who had left the college to set up the Vincentians. Dean Dowley, as he was then known, became the leader of the founding group. In 1840, Fr. Dowley and two others made their novitiate in Paris.

Dowley and his colleagues set up a school at Ushers Quay in Dublin, and also a congregation house in Phibsboro, and further, St. Vincent's Castleknock College. In 1838, St. Peter's church was handed over to the Vincentians. In 1848, when the province of the Congregation of the Mission was officially established in Ireland, Fr. Dowley became its first Provincial.

He acted as president of the seminary in Castleknock from its foundation, and stayed in the provincial residence at the college.

He died in Castleknock on 31 January 1864 and was succeeded by Father Thomas McNamara CM.
