= Travel and subsistence =

Travel and subsistence expenses describe the cost of spending on business travel, meals, hotels, sundry items such as laundry (though usually only on long trips) and similar ad hoc expenditures. These reimbursements often have tax and related implications, and vary depending on the country of the business.

An organization may refund or reimburse these costs on the basis of an itemized list, or may conclude that cost of doing so is disproportionately high and instead pay a per diem ("per day") allowance. This provides a budget from which the traveler may recover their costs. In this case, the traveler may choose to stay in more expensive hotels and pay the additional cost themselves.

== See also ==
- Business mileage reimbursement rate
- Per diem
