= Ron McCarten =

Irish rugby union player

- Full name: Ronald James McCarten
- Born: 6 August 1935 Seaton, Cumberland, England
- Died: 29 January 2021 (aged 85) Castleknock, Dublin, Ireland

Rugby union career
- Position: Wing
International career
Years	Team	Apps	(Points)
1961	Ireland	3	(0)

Ronald James McCarten (6 August 1935 – 29 January 2021) was an English-born Irish international rugby union player.

Born in Seaton, Cumberland, McCarten played for English clubs Workington Zebras, London Irish, and Oldham. He also played for RAF Changi during national service in Singapore. Qualifying through ancestry, McCarten made three Ireland appearance as a winger in the 1961 Five Nations, winning in his debut match against England at Lansdowne Road.

McCarten spent his post rugby years in Ireland, teaching at Castleknock College from 1969 to 2002.

In 2021, McCarten died after contracting COVID-19 in a nursing home.

== See also ==
- List of Ireland national rugby union players
