= Sam Clyne =

Irish priest and academic leader

Simon Clyne
- Born: Clara, County Offaly, Ireland

Academic background
- Education: Castleknock College
- Alma mater: Oxford University, Boston College

Academic work
- Discipline: Education
- Institutions: St Patrick's College (Drumcondra), Castleknock College

Simon "Sam" Clyne (died 2015) was an educational leader in Ireland, President of St Patrick's College, Drumcondra, the country's largest college of education, and a commentator on educational matters. A Vincentian priest and PhD holder, Sam Clyne also served as Principal of Castleknock College and as chaplain to the President of Ireland.

== Early life and education ==
Simon Clyne, often called "Sam", was born in Clara, County Offaly, Ireland, son of Michael and Angela Clyne. He had four brothers and three sisters. He, and all his brothers, attended Castleknock College in Dublin, where he was an active inter-schools rugby player. He was head prefect in his final year.

== Academic career and religious life ==
After school, Clyne entered the Congregation of the Mission, commonly known as the Vincentians, in St. Joseph's Blackrock, while studying for BA in UCD in 1956, and pursuing theological studies at St. Kevin's, Vincentian House of Studies, Glenart, Arklow. After ordination, at Clonliffe College, in 1960, he pursued studies in philosophy at the Pontifical University of Saint Thomas Aquinas (the Angelicum) in Rome, before moving to Oxford University, where he obtained honours bachelor's and master's degrees in philosophy, politics and economics.

He joined the staff of St Patrick's College, Drumcondra, Ireland's largest college of education, as a lecturer in philosophy and politics in 1964. Later roles there included dean of studies, Bursar (Head of Finance) and Head of the Education Department, the college's main component. He was appointed Acting President of the college from 1974 to 1976.

Clyne pursued doctoral studies with Boston College from 1979, and was awarded a PhD in Educational Administration and Supervision in 1982, with a thesis on The judicial evaluation model (a testing regime). He then returned to St. Patrick's to lead the graduate course for primary school teachers. He was chosen as President of St Patrick's College in 1985, and held that office until August 1999. He spoke out on educational matters, notably funding of schools, pupil-teacher ratios, and expectations and career prospects of teachers.

He became President (Principal) of Castleknock College after stepping down from St. Patrick's, serving from 1999 until retirement in 2005. He was a member of the Castleknock College Governing Body through 2005, overseeing new building development plans.

He also served as chaplain to the President of Ireland.

== Later personal life ==
After an illness in 2005, Clyne moved to the Sacred Heart Residence, Sybil Hill, opposite the Vincentian Provincialate and St. Paul's College, Raheny, in 2005. He died there on 22 January 2015. His funeral was held at St. Patrick's College, Drumcondra, and he was buried in Deansgrange Cemetery.
