= RJMetrics =

American software company

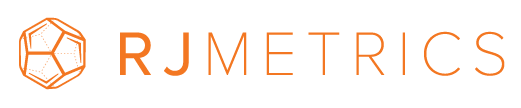
- Type: Private startup
- Industry: Computer software
- Founded: Philadelphia, Pennsylvania (2008)
- Founder: Jake Stein and Robert J. Moore
- Headquarters: Philadelphia, U.S.
- Number of employees: 71 (September 2014)
- Website: www.rjmetrics.com

RJMetrics is an American software company headquartered in Philadelphia, Pennsylvania. The company offers big data analytics to small and midsize businesses.

== History ==
RJMetrics was founded in January 2009 by Jake Stein and Robert J. Moore. The company had over 300 customers as of September 2014.

=== Funding ===
RJMetrics was a bootstrapped company until it received its first round of funding in 2012. The seed round was $1.2 million and came from Red Swan Ventures, Vision Ventures, SoftTech VC, Zelkova Ventures, Lerer Ventures, and SV Angel. In May 2013, RJMetrics received its Series A funding of $6.25 million from Trinity Ventures and SoftTech VC.

In September 2014, RJMetrics received its Series B funding of $16.5 million from SoftTech VC, Trinity Ventures, and August Capital. To-date, the Series B funding is one of the biggest rounds of funding received by a Philadelphia-based IT startup.

=== Acquisition ===
In August 2016, Magento acquired RJMetrics, and Stitch, Inc. was spun out as an independent company, with the same investors as RJMetrics.

== Platform ==
RJMetrics is a software as a service business intelligence platform. In July 2014 RJMetrics announced the v2 release of its product and rebranded as an analytics platform. The release included improvements to every major part of the software.

- Analytic Warehouse: Built on Amazon Redshift
- Transformation Cluster: Built on top of Hadoop
- Visualization Interface: Allows users to perform cohort analysis, calculate repeat event probability, and combine data from multiple sources

== Data journalism ==
RJMetrics has received a significant amount of press for their data journalism. Notable coverage includes:

- The Wall Street Journal covering RJMetrics’ analysis of Crunchbase
- Fast Company covering RJMetrics’ analysis of Airbnb
- Forbes covering RJMetrics’ analysis of the ALS ice bucket challenge
- TechCrunch covering RJMetrics’ analysis of the Biz Stone's Jelly App

In 2012, comedian Daniel Tosh covered RJMetrics' analysis of Chatroulette
