= John Conmee =

Jesuit educator who taught James Joyce (1847–1910)

John Stephen Conmee SJ (25 December 1847 – 1910) was an Irish Jesuit educator. He was born in County Roscommon into a wealthy farming family and was educated at Castleknock College and Clongowes Wood College. He influenced his student James Joyce and became a character in Joyce's novels A Portrait of the Artist as a Young Man and Ulysses. He was a rector of Clongowes Wood College, County Kildare and prefect of studies at Belvedere College.

Joyce was one of his students at Clongowes in 1888. Conmee was influential in granting Joyce and his brothers a scholarship place at Belvedere College, County Dublin in 1893 when Joyce's family collapsed into poverty. He appears under his own name in both Portrait and Ulysses.

Margot Norris analyzed Conmee's existence in some of Joyce's writing. Joyce described him as a bland and courtly humanist in a revision he made to the biography Herbert Gorman was writing about Joyce.
