= Joseph Leonard (priest) =

Irish Vincentian priest

Joseph Leonard, CM
- Born: 29 January 1877; Sligo, Ireland
- Died: 1964 (aged 86–87)
- Education: Castleknock College
- Alma mater: St. Joseph's, Blackrock, Co Dublin
- Occupation: Vincentian priest
- Known for: Service as a chaplain in World War I, friendship with Jacqueline Kennedy
- Notable work: Translations of texts from French to English
- Awards: British War Medal, Victory Medal

Joseph Leonard, CM, (1877-1964) was an Irish Vincentian priest.

Joseph Leonard was born in Sligo on 29 January 1877 to Patrick Leonard and his first wife Mary Fetherstone. He was educated at Castleknock College, in Dublin, part of the graduating class of 1895 and trained for the priesthood at St. Joseph's, the Vincentian seminary in Blackrock, Co Dublin.

He served as a chaplain in the British Army during World War I, rising to the rank of captain. He was awarded the British War Medal and the Victory Medal. An incident while in Flanders left him partially deaf. Fr Leonard was a scholar of St. Vincent De Paul, translating many texts from French into English, and taught in the Vincentian St. Mary's University College, and in his latter years in All Hallows College, Dublin, where he had returned to in 1939. He was a close friend of the politician John A. Costello and also of Liam Cosgrave who also served as Taoiseach.

While teaching in London he was friendly with public figures such as George Bernard Shaw and Lady Laverly.

He became friends with member of the family of Jackie Kennedy in the 1920s. He befriended Jacqueline Bouvier, as she then was, in 1950 when she visited Ireland with her step- brother, Father Leonard and Mrs. Kennedy maintained a regular correspondence until his death, and in 1955 Fr. Leonard invited Senator Kennedy to address the students at All Hallows while he was on a trip to Ireland. Jackie asked Fr. Leonard to baptise her son; however he was unable to do so owing to ill health.

By an odd coincidence, Father Oscar Huber, the priest who administered the last rites of the Catholic Church to President Kennedy in Dallas on 22 November 1963, was also a member of the Vincentian order.

Father Leonard died in 1964 aged 87, he is buried in the College Cemetery. Flowers from Jackie Kennedy were sent to his funeral in All Hallows.

A number of letters from Jackie Kennedy to Fr. Leonard were put up for sale at an auction scheduled for June 2014. However the auction was cancelled on 21 May by All Hallows in a statement which indicated the college were exploring ways with the Kennedy family of curating the letters. Some letters from Fr Leonard to the former first lady are stored in the Kennedy archive in Boston.
