= ClearSlide =

Software platform

ClearSlide, Inc.
- Company type: Subsidiary
- Founded: 2009; 17 years ago
- Successor: Bigtincan
- Headquarters: San Francisco, California, United States
- Owner: Bigtincan
- Founders: Al Lieb, Jim Benton
- CEO: Patrick Nichols
- Industry: Enterprise Software (Cloud-based)
- Products: Annual Web Based Software Subscription
- Services: Sales Engagement Platform, sales enablement
- Website: www.clearslide.com
- Current status: Acquired by Bigtincan

ClearSlide is a SaaS-based Sales Engagement platform that lets users share content and sales materials via email links or their viewer's link in a 'Live Pitch'. ClearSlide was designed for sales and marketing teams, accessible primarily via an annual subscription model. Clearslide was acquired by Bigtincan in December 2020.

== History ==
ClearSlide was founded in October 2009, funded by the founders and through initial subscribers. The company did not raise funds until the year following its launch.

In August 2012, ClearSlide raised a $28 million series B round of financing, announcing that it was to fuel their rapid growth and expansion plans. On March 5, 2013, the company bought SlideRocket from VMware.

A second acquisition was announced on July 2, 2013, when ClearSlide bought Crunched, a rival cloud-based sales engagement platform. In February 2014, ClearSlide raised $50 million in Series C funding from their partnership with Social+Capital Partnership. This led to additional contributions from Greylock Partners, Bessemer Venture Partners and Felicis Ventures.

The company's products include integration with Microsoft Dynamics, Gong, Slack, and Salesforce.

In December 2020, the company was acquired by Bigtincan.
