= Per diem =

Latin phrase used in business

Per diem (Latin for "per day" or "for each day") or daily allowance is a specific amount of money that an organization gives an individual, typically an employee, per day to cover living expenses when travelling on the employer's business.

A per diem payment can cover part or all of the expenses incurred. For example, it may include an accommodation allowance or it may only cover meals (with actual accommodation costs reimbursed separately, be prepaid or billed directly to the employer). Travel, particularly by motor vehicles, is often reimbursed at a rate determined only by distance travelled, e.g., the US business mileage reimbursement rate.

Fixed per diem (and per mile) rates eliminate the need for employees to prepare, and employers to scrutinise, a detailed expense report with supporting receipts to document amounts spent while travelling on business. Instead, employers pay employees a standard daily rate without regard to actual expenditure. In some countries, the income tax code specifies a maximum daily allowance: although an employer may pay a higher rate, the excess is subject to income tax.

== United Kingdom ==
A per diem in the UK is a daily allowance paid by an employer to cover work-related expenses when an employee is traveling for business. It is commonly used for meals, accommodation, transportation/local travel, and incidental expenses. Instead of reimbursing every receipt individually, the company may provide a fixed daily amount. In the UK, the term often overlaps with subsistence allowance, daily allowance, or travel allowance.

Accommodation and subsistence (meals) payments paid as fixed daily amounts are described as "scale rate expenses payments" by HM Revenue & Customs (HMRC). HMRC guidance does not use the term per diem, but it is used by some organisations. HMRC allows scale rate expenses payments for income tax purposes for travel within the UK, and allows a dispensation for such payments for travel abroad.

== United States ==
U.S. companies and organizations use the per diem rate guide published by the General Services Administration which provides rates for a number of cities in the Continental United States. For locations in the US outside the continental US, including Alaska, Hawaii and the US territories and possessions, per diem rates are published by the Per Diem, Travel and Transportation Allowance Committee (also known as the Per Diem Committee or PDTATAC). For all foreign locations, per diem rates are established by the Department of State.

Per diem is understood to include the additional expenses incurred living away from home—basically the need to have two residences. The GSA establishes per diem rates within the Continental United States for hotels "based upon contractor-provided average daily rate (ADR) data of fire-safe properties in the local lodging industry"; this means that per diem varies depending on the location of the hotel—for instance, New York City has a higher rate than Gadsden, Alabama.

To qualify for a per diem, work-related business activity generally requires an overnight stay. The IRS code does not specify a number of miles. However, based on case precedent and IRS rulings, it is commonly accepted that an overnight stay must genuinely be required and actually occurs, to justify payment of per diem allowance. The purpose of the per diem payment (or the deduction of expenses when inadequate reimbursements are provided) is to alleviate the burden on taxpayers whose business or employment travel creates duplicated expenses.

The US military pays its members per diem in accordance with the Joint Travel Regulations. According to these regulations, the first and last days of travel are paid 75% of the daily General Services Administration, PDTATAC, or DOS rate, while all other days of travel receive the full rate. The JTR also states that lodging taxes for CONUS and non foreign OCONUS are a reimbursable expense but requires a receipt. The JTR also follows the 'expenses below $75 do not require a receipt' rule, established by the Internal Revenue Service although local disbursing officers may question charges they feel may be false.

The US Government also allows federal employees to purchase a home at the temporary duty location and claim the allowable expenses of: mortgage interest, property taxes and utility costs actually incurred.

In addition, truck drivers have a special way of calculating a tax deduction for per diem. All drivers who are subject to USDOT hours of service are eligible. As of October 1, 2009, the per diem rate is $59 per day, and they may deduct 80% of this amount from their taxable income.

Due to the large number of away games and associated travel days in American sports, per diem rates are often major components in collective bargaining agreements between leagues and their players' unions. As of 2016, the NBA has the highest per-diem for players at $115 per day, followed by the NHL whose per-diem began at a base of $100/day in 2012–13 and is adjusted each year based on changes in the US Consumer Price Index. Minor pro and collegiate athletes also receive meal money for overnight trips, usually paid as a rate set by the league or university they are affiliated with. As athlete salaries have risen, per diems have occasionally become a contentious issue when negotiating CBAs: for instance, in 2016 Major League Baseball slashed allowances from $100/day to $35/day, citing high salaries and teams now providing pre- and post-game food to players on the road as their rationale.

=== Railroads ===
For American railroads, per diem is a charge railroads levy when their freight cars are on other railroads' property, to assure prompt return.

=== Contract law ===
Per diem clauses may be used in contracts to specify penalty accruals. Such wording would be found in reference to the expected closing date for a real estate contract, typically compensating a seller for a buyer's lack of expedience..

== Russia ==
Per diem in Russia is normally set up by companies but in accordance with the legislation cannot be lower than 700 ₽ for travel in Russia and 2500 ₽ for travel outside of Russia. If employees pay for a hotel in cash or with a payment card, then they must retain any billing invoices (Russian: кассовый чек, romanized: kassovy check). The regulations governing the use of invoices by business entities allow certain taxpayers to produce handwritten receipts (Russian: квитанция, romanized: kvitantsia) at a point of sale instead of printed invoices. Handwritten receipts usually contain the same information as receipts and invoices and are treated as sufficient evidence of expense.

Generally a per diem allowance covers:

- Cost of meal;
- Fees and tips for services;
- Laundry, dry cleaning etc.;
- Room service.

Russian tax regulations do not provide for any alternative to per diem method for reimbursing employee's meal cost and incidental expenses. Meal costs and other incidental expenses cannot be treated as deductible expenses because they are already covered by per diem allowances.

Meals may be treated as deductible expenses only if they qualify as hospitality expenses. Companies are free to set their own per diem rates or maximum allowances that employees are reimbursed for expenses incurred while on business trip.

The portion of per diem allowance in excess of 700 ₽ for travel in Russia and 2,500 ₽ for travel outside Russia is deemed employee's taxable income. The excess is treated as part of employee's taxable gross income and must be withheld from his/her earnings.

== Germany ==
In Germany, per diem allowances are calculated in accordance with the provisions of the German Income Tax Act. The Act sets out the per diem amounts that must be paid based on the location the temporary location a worker is visiting and the duration of stay. The rates are reviewed and normally increased on an annual basis. Reimbursement of travel expenses must be claimed within six months of travel (beginning with the first day following completion of your journey). Travel expenses cannot be claimed after this period.

There are different rules for travel within the country and international trips. For domestic business trips spanning more than one day, employees receive €28 (was €24 until 31/12/2019) for every 24 hours that they are away from their home and primary workplace and €14 (was €12 until 31/12/2019) for the day of departure and arrival, if the employee does not spend the night at their home. For single-day trips employees receive €14 (was €12 until 31/12/2019) for the calendar day if the employee spends at least 8 hours away from their home or primary workplace. If the trip is outside of Germany the amount varies by country (and in some cases city).

== Kenya ==
Section 5(2)(a) of the Kenya Income Tax Act imposes tax on subsistence, travelling, entertainment or other allowances received by an employee in respect of employment or services rendered. However, where the Commissioner is satisfied that the amounts so received "solely represent reimbursement" to the employee, the same shall not be chargeable to tax.

"Per diem" refers to payments in respect of subsistence, travelling, entertainment and other allowances made by an employer to his employee while the employee is on official duties outside his usual station of work.

Where per diem solely represents reimbursement, a person shall furnish supporting evidence to the Commissioner, provided that where the amount does not exceed two thousand shillings per day, no such supporting evidence shall be required.

However, the organisation can seek the Commissioner's opinion regarding the admissibility of any per diem scales (or any other rates) prior to or after payment, in which case, the per diem amount shall not be taxable on the employee.

The opinion shall be accompanied with factors that influence the per diem rate and justification for the rates used including: the cost of living in different geographical zones or localities within the country and overseas travel, where applicable.

== United Nations Development Programme ==
A Daily Subsistence Allowance (DSA) comprises the UNDP's total contribution towards such charges as lodging, meals, gratuities, transport cost from place of lodging to the first place of official business, and vice versa, and other payments made for personal services rendered.

A DSA is applicable for UNDP staff members on authorized official travel and for non-staff members when their travel is organized and paid by UNDP. For non-staff members it is on the basis of the standards established for staff members, except where otherwise expressly provided in the terms of their contract.

== See also ==
- United Kingdom parliamentary expenses scandal
