= Segal (company) =

American benefits consulting firm

- Type: Consultancy
- Industry: Human resources consulting
- Founded: 1939; 87 years ago
- Headquarters: New York City, New York, United States
- Number of locations: Offices in the US and Canada
- Key people: President and CEO: John DeMairo; Chair of the Board: David Blumenstein; Vice Chair: Joseph A. LoCicero
- Services: Retirement Consulting; Health Benefit Consulting; HR and Benefits Communications; Compensation & Career Strategies
- Number of employees: 1,100 (2025)
- Website: segalco.com

Segal is an American benefits and human resource consulting firm headquartered in New York City, with 1,100 employees throughout the U.S. and Canada. It is the parent of Segal Marco Advisors, Segal Select Insurance Services, and Segal Benz.

== History ==
Segal was founded in 1939 by Martin E. Segal as the Martin E. Segal Company in New York, which provided consultants and actuaries for employee benefit plans.

In 1969, the company founded Segal Advisors as its investment consulting unit. In 1991, the company’s name was shortened to The Segal Co. When Segal acquired Rogerscasey in 2012, the name of the investment unit changed to Segal Rogerscasey.

In 2013, Segal’s Fiduciary Liability Insurance Practice was incorporated as the insurance brokerage subsidiary of Segal and renamed Segal Select Insurance Services, Inc. At the end of 2013, Segal Consulting opened its Edmonton office to better serve its clients in Western Canada. The company had previously opened offices in Calgary, Montreal, and Toronto.

In 2016, the firm announced the upcoming acquisition of the Marco Consulting Group. The acquisition became effective January 1, 2017, and Segal Rogerscasey became Segal Marco Advisors. The new company had combined advisory assets of more than $500 billion.

In 2019, Segal’s communication practice combined with the acquisition of Benz Communications to form Segal Benz.

In 2020, Segal acquired LRWL Inc., a provider of public sector retirement systems implementation services, integrating its team into Segal’s Administration, Technology, and Consulting Practice. This acquisition enhances Segal’s support for public sector entities, which was noted by David Blumenstein, Segal’s CEO.

In 2022, Segal acquired Michigan-based insurance broker Union Services Agency, which provides services to labor organizations, multiemployer funds and public sector entities. The same year, it acquired Milliman’s San Francisco investment consulting practice.

In 2024, Segal acquired a commercial insurance book business from J.A. Mariano agency.

Also in 2024, Segal's State Employee Health Study examined 2023–2024 medical and prescription drug plans for full-time state employees across all 50 states. Released with an interactive map, the report showed that most states offered multiple plan options, over half included high-deductible plans with HSA contributions, and regional differences affected employee costs and prescription drug coverage.

In 2025, John DeMairo was appointed President and Chief Executive Officer of Segal, succeeding David Blumenstein after a ten-year tenure. DeMairo previously served as head of Segal Marco Advisors and as Vice Chair of the Board of Directors at the privately held firm.

== Services ==
Segal offers services in retirement consulting, health benefits consulting, benefits administration consulting, benefit audits, HR and benefits communications, compensation and career strategies, compliance consulting, HR and benefits technology, commercial insurance brokerage services, investment solutions, mergers and acquisitions, organizational effectiveness, financial well-being, and property and casualty insurance.

== Acquisitions and mergers ==
- 2001: Marjorie Gross & Co.
- 2002: Sibson & Company
- 2006: Irwin Tepper Associates
- 2010: Aon Consulting’s U.S. multiemployer defined benefit plan and related consulting business
- 2012: Rogerscasey
- 2014: The Waters Consulting Group
- 2014: Moroni Fantin (Segal acquired a portion of the business)
- 2014: Excelcor
- 2017: Marco Consulting Group
- 2018: Touchstone Consulting
- 2018: The Singer Group
- 2019: Benz Communications
- 2020: LRWL
- 2022: Milliman - San Francisco Investment Consulting Practice
- 2022: Union Services Agency
- 2024: J.A. Mariano Agency
- 2025: Intactic
