= BrightTalk =

Technology company

BrightTALK
- Company type: Subsidiary
- Founded: 2002
- Founder: Paul Heald; Dorian Logan; Val-Pierre Genton
- Headquarters: Newton, Massachusetts, United States
- Parent: Informa TechTarget
- Website: www.brighttalk.com

BrightTALK is a technology media company that provides professional webinar hosting.

== History ==
BrightTALK was founded in London in 2002 by Paul Heald and Dorian Logan to pursue the development of webcasting technologies in knowledge industries. BrightTALK developed its first technology platform to deliver recorded video presentations with synchronized slides and live audio (or webinar) and focused initially on the fund management industry.

BrightTALK later extended its business into other knowledge-based sectors, such as information technology and health, in addition to business-to-business media, which they entered through a joint venture with Incisive Media (also known as Conjecture) in 2004. The first version of BrightTALK Media Zone, a rebuild of the original webcasting technology, launched the following year. The company funded the development of e-Symposium, the world's first virtual events platform founded by Val-Pierre Genton, which it acquired in the end of 2005, and renamed BrightTALK Conferences.

BrightTALK opened its first office in the United States in 2006 and began to develop the technology to make live audio webcasting possible as a self-service tool. The company launched its current website in September 2008.

In December 2020, TechTarget, a business-to-business intent data service, acquired BrightTALK.

In December 2024, TechTarget combined with Informa Tech’s digital businesses to form Informa TechTarget.

== See also ==
- Webcast
- Web conferencing
