= SlideRocket =

Online presentation platform

- Company type: Private
- Website type: online presentation platform
- Available in: English
- Founded: Jan 2006
- Headquarters: San Francisco, CA
- Key people: Mitch Grasso, Mike Lingle co-founders
- Services: software applications
- Website: http://sliderocket.com/
- Launched: October 2008
- Current status: active

SlideRocket
- Developer: ClearSlide
- Operating system: Web-based Application
- Type: Web-based Productivity Tools
- License: Proprietary
- Website: SlideRocket.com

SlideRocket was an online presentation platform that let users create, manage, share and measure presentations. SlideRocket was provided via a SaaS model. The company was acquired by VMware in April 2011, who sold it to ClearSlide, a similar SaaS application, in March 2013. It is no longer offering independent signups, as the platform is being integrated into ClearSlide.

== History ==
SlideRocket was founded in Jan 2006, and launched as a private beta in March 2008 at the Under The Radar Spring event. A public beta was announced in September 2008 followed shortly by public release on October 28, 2008. SlideRocket is most commonly credited with inventing the PResuMÉ or Presentation Résumé in early 2009.

On April 26, 2011, SlideRocket was acquired by VMware. On March 5, 2013, VMware sold SlideRocket to ClearSlide. SlideRocket is based in San Francisco.

== See also ==
- Presentation
- Presentation Software
- Communication Design
- Rich Internet application
- SaaS
