= Business mileage reimbursement rate =

Mileage rate used to compute tax deductions

The business mileage reimbursement rate is an optional standard mileage rate used in the United States for purposes of computing the allowable business deduction, for Federal income tax purposes under the Internal Revenue Code, at 26 U.S.C. § 162, for the business use of a vehicle. Under the law, the taxpayer for each year is generally entitled to deduct either the actual expense amount, or an amount computed using the standard mileage rate, whichever is greater.

The business mileage reimbursement rate is used by some employers for computing employee reimbursement amounts when an employee operates a motor vehicle not owned by the employer for the employer's business purposes. The General Services Administration (GSA) sets the rate for federal jobs. In general, the GSA rate matches the annual rate set by the IRS, although by law the government employee reimbursement rate cannot exceed the mileage rate set by the IRS for business deductions.

Reimbursement by an employer on a per-mile basis is also used in other countries; it offers a similar simplification to payment of subsistence per diem.

== Reimbursement rates since 1991 ==
Year	Automobile Rate (IRS)	Privately-Owned Aircraft Rate (GSA)	Motorcycle
1991	27.5 cents/mile		
1992	28.0 cents/mile		
1994	29.0 cents/mile		
1995	30.0 cents/mile		
1996	31.0 cents/mile		
1997	31.5 cents/mile		
1998	32.5 cents/mile		
Jan–Mar 1999	32.5 cents/mile		
Apr–Dec 1999	31.0 cents/mile		
2000	32.5 cents/mile		
2001	34.5 cents/mile		
2002	36.5 cents/mile		
2003	36.0 cents/mile		
2004	37.5 cents/mile		
Jan–Aug 2005	40.5 cents/mile		
Sep–Dec 2005	48.5 cents/mile		
2006	44.5 cents/mile		
2007	48.5 cents/mile		
Jan–June 2008	50.5 cents/mile		
July–Dec 2008	58.5 cents/mile		
2009	55.0 cents/mile	$1.24/mile	
2010	50.0 cents/mile	$1.29/mile	
Jan–June 2011	51.0 cents/mile	$1.29/mile	
July–Dec 2011	55.5 cents/mile	$1.29/mile	
2012	55.5 cents/mile	$1.31/mile	
2013	56.5 cents/mile	$1.33/mile	
2014	56.0 cents/mile	$1.31/mile	
2015	57.5 cents/mile	$1.29/mile	
2016	54 cents/mile	$1.17/mile	
2017	53.5 cents/mile	$1.17/mile	
2018	54.5 cents/mile	TBA	
2019	58 cents/mile		
2020	57.5 cents/mile	$1.27/mile	54.5 cents/mile
2021	56 cents/mile		
Jan–June 2022	58.5 cents/mile		
July–Dec 2022	62.5 cents/mile		
2023	65.5 cents/mile		
2024	67 cents/mile		
2025	70 cents/mile		
Jan–June 2026	72.5 cents/mile		
July–Dec 2026	76 cents/mile		
