= List of buildings designed by Andrew Devane =

The following is a list of buildings designed by Irish architect Andrew Devane as part of Robinson, Keefe & Devane.

Year	Name	Location	Status	Other information	Image
c. 1947	Monument Café	Dublin	Alterations to existing building.		
1950	Monument Creamery	166 Phibsborough Road			
1961	Journey's End	Howth, Dublin		House for Devane family, with curvilinear extension on the sea side of an earlier bungalow, modified with large extensions.	
	The End	Howth		Detached single storey house with concrete roof and roof garden for Devane family. Built after 'Journey's End' on an adjoining site. Never occupied by the Devane family.	
	Thulla	Howth		Built for the McMullen family. House subsequently demolished to make way for housing estate	
1960s	Shielmartin Cottage	Howth		Built for Commander Bradshaw.	
	Taoiseach's House	Scholarstown, Rathfarnham		Built for Liam Cosgrave. Location of house was described as Tallaght in certain publications	
	Santane	Strand Road, Sutton, Dublin			
	Belgrove School,	Seafield Road west, Clontarf, Dublin 3.	Extension to Victorian building consisting of School hall and classrooms.		
1956–1958	The Tansey	Ceanchor Road, Howth		Alterations to original house built in 1740.	
	Renovation to Mews house	St James' Terrace		For Dr Rory O'Hanlon.	
	Pimlico apartment blocks	Dublin 8		Floor layouts prepared by Dublin Corporation, Architectural treatment, site planning, landscaping by Devane.	
1951	St Mary's Girls' School	Bishop Street, King's Island, Limerick			
1957	St Munchin's Girls' and Infants' School	Ballynanty, Limerick City			
1963	Scoil Mháthair Dé National School<refname=":0" />	South Circular Road, Limerick			
1975	St John's Girls and Infant Boys National School	Cathedral Place, Limerick		Subsequently retrofitted and undergone internal reorganisation 2005 - 2006 by Quin Savage Smyth Architects.	
1955	Gaelscoil Sáirséal	Shelbourne Road, Limerick		Former Christian Brothers' School, St Munchin's Boys National School, Hassett's Cross, Limerick. Subsequently renovated and in use from 2016 as Gaelscoil Sáirséal.	
1980s	St Fintan's Primary School	Sutton, Dublin		Subsequently extended by Robinson Keefe Devane Architects to Devane's original design.	
1954	St Canice's Boys' School	Glasanaon Road, Finglas, Dublin	School has been provided with new windows, security shutters, meeting hall etc. by others.		
	St John's School	Garryowen Road, Limerick			
1957	Church of the Holy Child	Whitehall, Dublin		Officially opened 1 December 1957. The Church was built in brick with granite dressings and a mosaic of the Holy Family over the main entrance. It was designed to accommodate a congregation of 1750 worshippers and cost £170,000. Floor plan, architectural treatment etc. by John J. Robinson. no evidence of input by Devane.	
1957	School	Ballygall Road, Finglas		Extension.	
1957–1961	Marist School	Clogher Road, Dublin		Located opposite the technical school.	
	St Patrick's Primary School, Junior and Senior Schools	Drumcondra Road, Dublin			
c.1978.	Howth Primary School			Extension.	
1960–1963	Beneavin College	Finglas	partly demolished, and altered	Assembly Hall (burnt down), administration wing (demolished), science block (demolished), classroom block (altered).	
	Clongowes Wood College, Link building	Clane, Co. kildare.			
1966	St Colmcille Boys' School	Church Lane, Swords			
1960	St Lorcan's College	Stillorgan, Dublin	Located opposite Baumanns store.		
	Saint Vincent de Paul's School, Upper Henry Street	Limerick		Renovations of former school. Today it is the Social Welfare Centre	
1952–1956	Gonzaga College	Ranelagh, Dublin		Hall, library, classrooms, and tower. The classrooms on the West side were built by Devane at a later date. The chapel was a later commission (1967).	
1955–1960	Holy Faith School	Finglas		Including Assembly Hall extension in 1963.	
1955–1957	St Ferghal's Boys' School	Cappagh Road, Finglas	In use as intended.		
	Convent of Mercy Girls' Schools	Longford	In use as intended.		
1955–1956	Mary Immaculate College	South Circular Road, Limerick		Extension, multi storey residential extension at rear.	
1950–1954	Pearse College	Clogher Road, Dublin	In use as intended.		
1952–1954	Technical School	Emmett Road, Inchicore	In use as intended.	Staircase based on Wright's Falling Water house. Much modified with new windows etc.	
1959	Technical School	Swords County Dublin		Original school at street frontage and Extension to rear.	
1954	Technical School	Rush, County Dublin			
1951–1953	Technical School	Balbriggan, County Dublin			
1951–1953	Technical School	Lucan, County Dublin			
1955	Technical School	Dundrum, County Dublin		Similarities with Swords Technical School.	
	Divine Word Missionaries, College	Moyglare Road, Maynooth, County Kildare	Residential blocks for staff and students, tower, teaching rooms etc.		
1964	St Patrick's Training College	Drumcondra, Dublin		Church, gymnasium, dining hall, residential accommodation, library, teaching facilities, Educational research centre and campanile.	
	Dublin City University			Canteen, teaching block, and water tower. Formerly National Institute of Higher Education.	
1960s	Our Lady Seat of Wisdom Chapel	Dublin City University			
1954	Urological Unit, Meath Hospital	Dublin			
1949	Mount Carmel Hospital	Braemor Park, Churchtown, County Dublin		New nursing home, including oratory.	
1968	Port Elizabeth Hospital	South Africa			
	Hospital Dollis Hill	London	demolished		
	Adelaide and Meath Hospital incorporating National Children's Hospital	Tallaght		Concept and design of various departments. The design was further developed within the Robinson Keefe Devane office. The intended mirror glass to the deep courtyards was not implemented. Formally known as Tallaght Regional Hospital.	
1962	Temple Street Children's University Hospital			Masterplan, first building, convent and chapel.	
	Calcutta Drug Rehabilitation centre	Kolkata			
	St John's Hospital	Limerick		Hospital Chapel and Hospital Alterations	
	Cavan General Hospital	Cavan		New hospital and detached turf-fired boiler house which was later adapted for other fuels.	
	Jervis Street Hospital	Dublin	demolished	Masterplan and theatres.	
	M. M. M. Hospital	Drogheda		Theatres and extension.	
1954	Bon Secours Hospital, Galway	Galway		Previously known as St Galvia Private Hospital.	
	Assisi House	Navan Road, Dublin	In use for original purpose.	Chapel and age related residential home.	
1966	Manresa House	Dollymount, Dublin	In use for original purpose.	Chapel and multi-storey retreat house.	
	The Communications Centre	Stillorgan Road and Booterstown Avenue, Dublin	demolished	Building demolished, boundary wall remains. Apartments built on the site.	
1963	Boys Club and Administration Building	Nicholas Street, Dublin	In use by St Vincent de Paul.	For St. Vincent de Paul.	
	Milford House Novitiate	Limerick		Alterations.	
	Airmonut Convent	Waterford			
1971	Stephen Court	Dublin	In use as office building. Anglo-Irish bank are no longer tenants.	An office building built for Irish Life. Building altered by removing public access to the central courtyard and sculpture and relocating office entrance to street facade.	
1982	Ceann Arus, G.A.A. Headquarters Building	Jones's Road, Dublin	demolished		
1978	AIB Bankcentre	Ballsbridge, Dublin	partly demolished 2019	Office complex and computer centre. Front four three and four storey blocks demolished, to make way for larger buildings.	
	Turlough Hill Power Station	County Wicklow	In use for original purpose.	Administration Building, offices and control building for the E.S.B.	
1980	Irish Life Centre	Lower Abbey Street	In use as original purpose.	Includes swimming pool, theatre, archives, and second floor gardens. Originally designed to be two stories higher. Later extension to the Centre, with facades to Abbey Street and Marlborough Street, Dublin including department store at ground floor level, garden at first floor level with central conference centre.	
1964	Our Lady Queen of Heaven Church	Dublin Airport		Church, campanile, atrium and adjoining house.	
1955	Our Lady and St David	Naas, County Kildare		Mortuary chapel only.	
1976	St Lelia's Church	Killeely Road, Ballynantybeg, Limerick	renovated by Kernan Architects	In use as church.	
1973	St Fintan's Church parish hall as designed has been demolished and new hall by RKD Architects.	Sutton, Dublin	In use as church.	Atrium, campanile, parish centre (rebuilt in the original spirit), and parochial house.	
	Our Lady of Good Counsel Church	Johnstown, Killiney	Parish hall demolished, church renovated by RKD	Church renovated by others, parish hall (demolished), entrance courtyard (demolished).	In use as designed.
	Church	Central Highlands, New Guinea		Built in timber frame and grass cladding.	
	St Mary's Church	Tampa, Florida, United States			
	St Mary's Church Howth	Howth		Reordering of sanctuary.	
	Fr. John Sullivan tomb, Gardiner Street Church	Gardiner Street, Dublin			
	Oratory at Loyola House	Eglington Road		Destroyed in fire.	
	Convent for Missionaries of Charity	South Circular Road, Dublin		For Mother Teresa nuns. Adaption of existing house.	
1959	Shannon Shamrock Hotel	Bunratty, County Limerick		Hotel closed in 2009	
1964	Irish Pavilion, New York Worlds Fair	New York, United States	demolished	Temporary building.	

== Unrealised projects ==
Year	Name	Location	Other information
	Umtali Cathedral, Rhodesia	Mutare, Zimbabwe	Concept sketch plans only.
	Office building complex	Ship Street, Dublin Castle	On the site of serpentine gardens.
1950s	Church, Bird Avenue		Competition entry.
	Chapel of Reconciliation	Knock, County Mayo	Competition entry, 3rd place.
	House	Blessington	For Mrs. Montefiori.
	Housing	29–31, Permbroke Gardens	Scheme as built is similar to the original concept.
	AIB Headquarters	Ranelagh	The project was relocated to Ballsbridge site, and housing was built on site.
	Mount Carmel Hospital Oratory	Rathgar	Appears on perspective drawings but was not built.
	A.I.B. Bankcentre Ballsbridge Amenity Block K and Housing Block J		Mixed use was a planning requirement, housing subsequently designed by others.
	All Hallows College	Drumcondra	Curvilinear building from the Junior House to O'Donnell House.
	Waterfront Commercial Development	Limerick	
	Reordering of Trinity College Chapel	Dublin City.	Scheme probably considered too radical at the time proposed.
	Tower at Adelaide and Meath Hospital	Tallaght	Tower was intended to stand at the main entrance to enable visitors to navigate from the site entrance to the building entrance.
