= Catholic University School =

Private secondary school in Dublin, Ireland

Location
- 89 Lower Leeson Street, Dublin 2 Ireland; 53.3353°N 6.2559°W

Information
- Type: Voluntary (private) school
- Motto: Sub Mariae Nomine (Under the name of Mary)
- Religious affiliations: Roman Catholic; Society of Mary
- Established: 1867; 159 years ago
- Headmaster: Clive Martin
- Gender: Male
- Enrollment: 525 (2018)
- Colours: Blue and Red
- Founder(s): Bartholomew Woodlock
- Website: www.cus.ie

Catholic University School (C.U.S.) is a private Catholic secondary school for boys in Dublin, Ireland. The school was founded in 1867 by Bartholomew Woodlock as a preparatory school for the Catholic University of Ireland, the predecessor to University College Dublin, that was founded by St. John Henry Newman in 1854.

Under the custodianship of the Marist Fathers, the school has educated Irish politicians, academic and literary figures, and three Olympic gold medalists.

== History ==
=== Origins ===
The foundation of the Catholic University School has its basis in the Catholic Revival movement of the late 1820s. For over 250 years, the only university in Ireland had been Trinity College, Dublin – the sole constituent college of the University of Dublin. While the Trinity College had been opened to Catholics in 1793 (they could not be elected as Scholars, Fellows, or Professors), only a few attended. Those Catholics who did were mainly educated in England at schools such as Stonyhurst College.

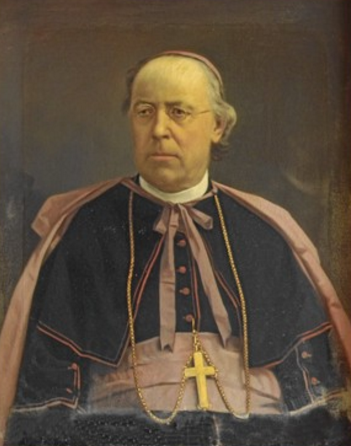
Bartholomew Woodlock
First president of the School

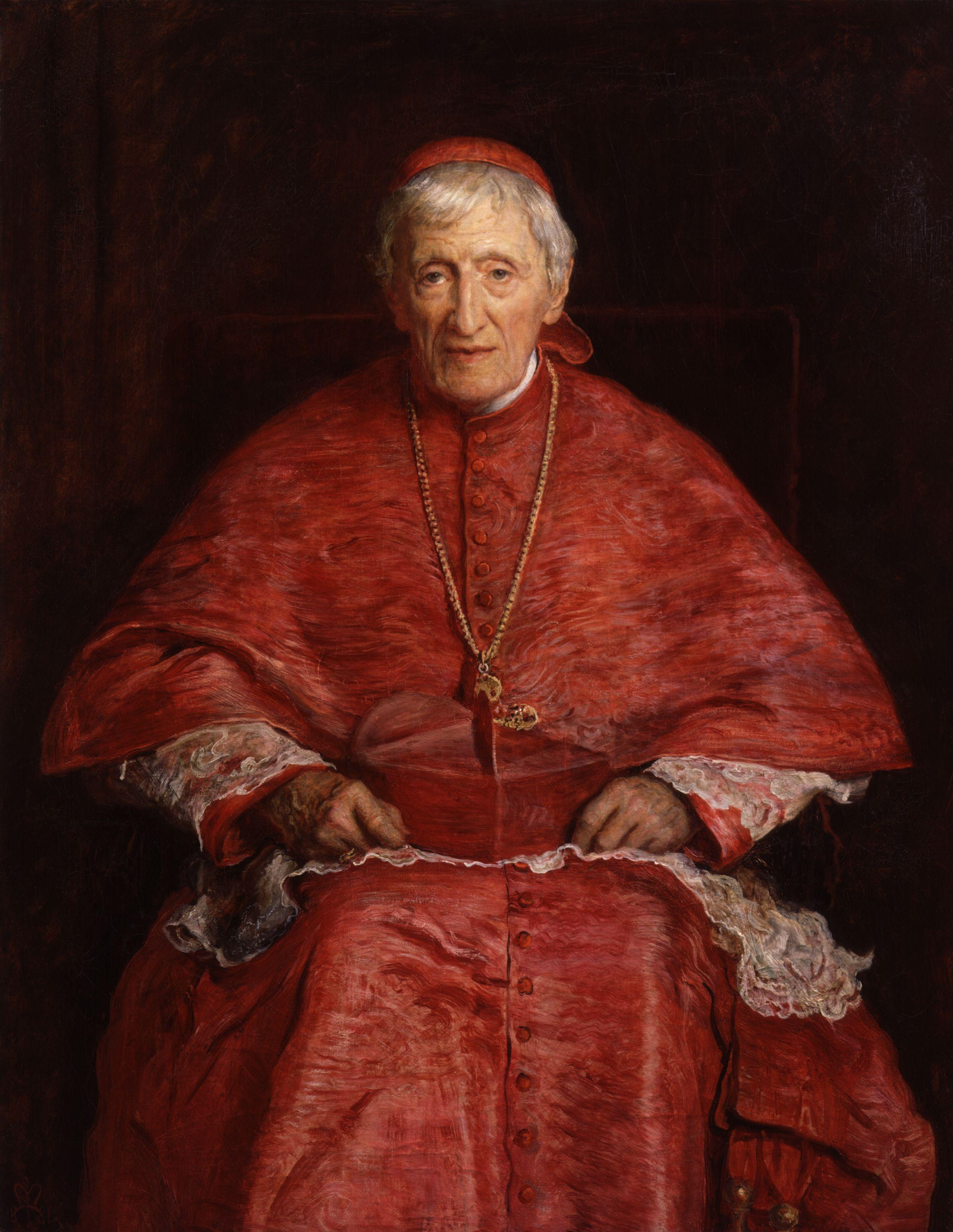
St. John Henry Newman

In response, in 1850, Queen Victoria granted a Royal Charter founding three colleges of the Queen's University of Ireland. The colleges in Cork, Belfast and Galway were non-denominational. However, at the Synod of Thurles in 1850, the Catholic Church officially condemned these institutions as "Godless Colleges" and declared a need for a Catholic University. Thus, the Catholic University of Ireland was founded in 1851 – though not fully established until 18 May 1854 with Cardinal John Henry Newman as its first Rector.

=== Early years ===
To ensure larger numbers of students for the new university, Dr Daniel Murray, the Archbishop of Dublin established a school at 16–17 Harcourt Street and named the school after Saint Laurence O'Toole, the patron Saint of Dublin. St. Laurence's Academy, founded in 1850, was accompanied by the establishment of Belvedere College by the Jesuits in 1832 on the north side of the city. The University, as yet, had no dedicated preparatory or feeder school.

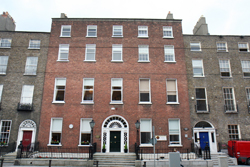
17 Harcourt Street, the original location of the school

By 1862, Dr. Bartholomew Woodlock took over as rector of the Catholic University, and suggested that the university proceed with the foundation of its own feeder school. Over time, St. Laurence's Academy developed a close relationship with the university. Woodlock was the first president of the school and professors from the university also taught in the school. The school was given a name reflecting its function: the Catholic University School.

The first teachers in the school were mostly young Dublin priests who had studied at the Irish College in Rome. Among them was Dr. James Quinn, who set about enrolling students from wealthy Catholic families. Within a year the school had an enrollment of 130 students. The subjects taught were classical rather than practical and included Greek, Latin, French, German, Italian and the Arts. Pope Pius XI eventually chose Quinn as the first Roman Catholic Archbishop of Brisbane, Australia – and he left the school.

=== Marist takeover ===
In the early 1860s, the finances of the Catholic University School and Catholic University of Ireland were intertwined, and the rent for the Harcourt Street premises was a high £2600 per annum. Neither the school nor the university were able to cope with this burden. Archbishop of Dublin, Paul Cullen was adamant that it was not possible for C.U.S to close down even for a year – because it would be possible that the school would never open again.

In 1867 both Cardinal Cullen and Bartholomew Woodlock travelled to Dundalk for the consecration of Michael Kiernan as Archbishop of Armagh. While there, they visited the Marist College and believed that Marist administration would be beneficial to the Catholic University School. Subsequently, Cardinal Cullen brought the offer to the General Council of the Marist Fathers in Lyon in France. After a two-day petition, he convinced the Council of the benefit of taking on the Dublin school. In July 1867, Woodlock informed Cullen of the financial burden the Harcourt Street premises had been. He recommended that the Marists purchase new premises, and when 89 Lower Leeson Street became available, the Marists purchased it. The Harcourt Street site remained on as the premises for the school for a short while as refurbishments were carried out on the Leeson Street building. On 29 September 1867 the Catholic University School opened on Lower Leeson Street.

=== Later years ===
In 2019, the school was involved in a High Court dispute with a former teacher. The court ruled that the teacher had been denied a fair disciplinary process, and the school was ordered to reform its complaints and disciplinary processes.

== Curriculum ==
The curriculum offers over 20 subjects and covers all common subjects in the state examinations including Classical Studies, Art History, German, Art, Art history, Chemistry, Physics, Accounting and Economics. Academically, the school has ranked as one of the top secondary schools in Ireland, and was named by the Irish Times as the top feeder school (to universities and third-level institutions) in the country in 2023. According to the school's website, class sizes "do not exceed 22-24" and are "[lower] for option subjects". The preparatory school offers the full primary curriculum as well introducing pupils to Spanish and Mandarin.

== Traditions ==
The school's song, “Walking On”, is sometimes heard at school events and at rugby matches. The primary religious anthem of the school in recent years has been Dominican Magnificat, taken from The Magnificat passage in The Gospel of Luke.

Historically, the school was divided into three houses; Colin, Sarsfield, and Bodkin. Students were placed under the supervision of a housemaster, usually a clerical member of the teaching staff.

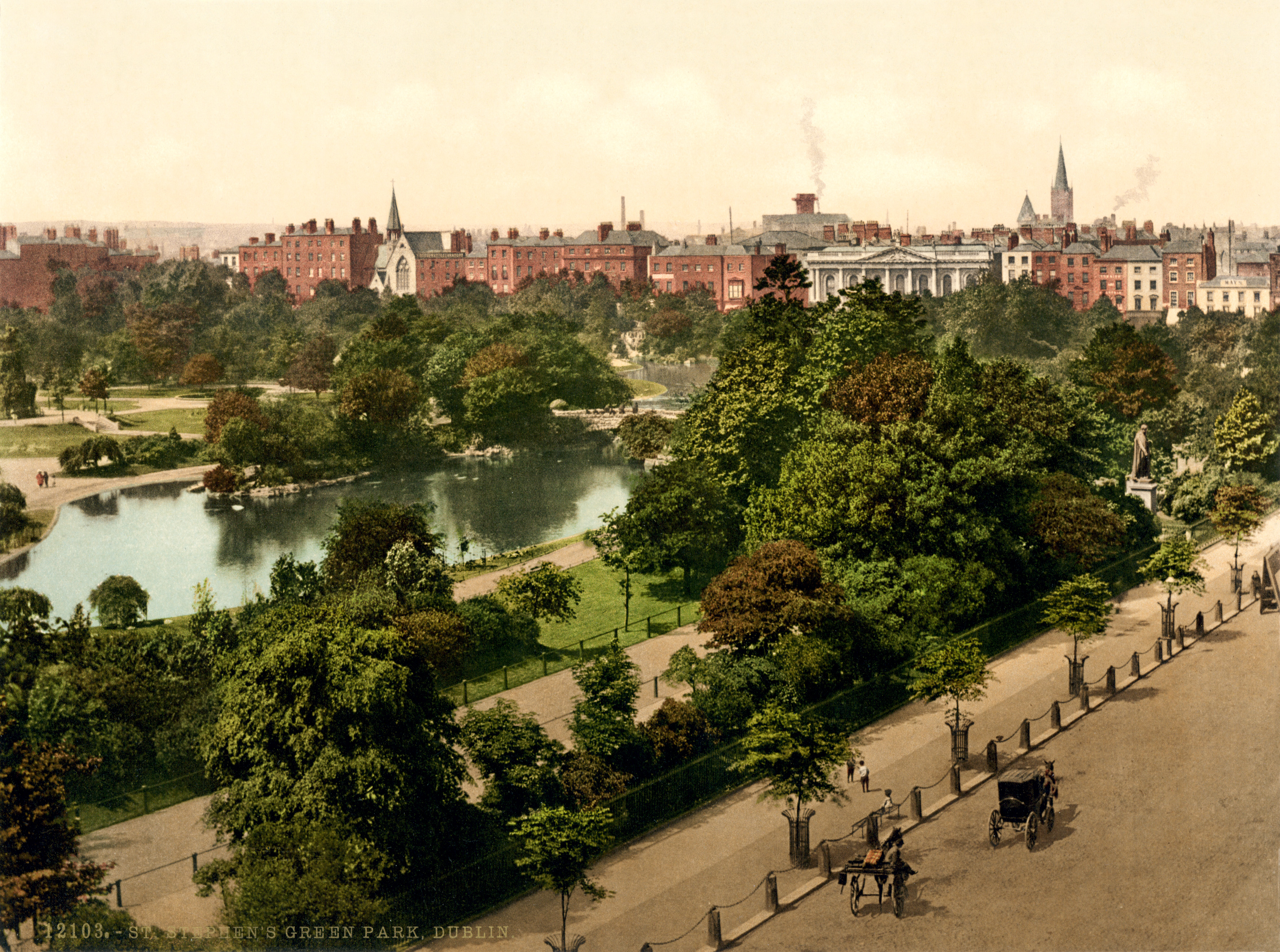
Photochrom print showing St. Stephen's Green at the end of the 19th century

== Facilities ==
The school is located near St Stephen's Green in Dublin. School buildings include; the Georgian buildings to the front of the school containing the Oratory and Headmasters residence, Victorian buildings, a sports hall with gym and changing rooms and the "old school" building. The school also owns land in Clonskeagh, County Dublin, which is home to the school's rugby pitches, cricket field and a sports pavilion.

== School activities ==
=== Sports ===
Teams representing CUS participate in schools rugby and cricket competitions in Leinster. CUS has won the Leinster Senior Cup in cricket six times since 1999.

Other sports played include tennis and athletics. Rugby and cricket take place at Bird Avenue in Clonskeagh. Three Olympic Gold Medalists have attended the school; John Pius Boland, Ronnie Delaney, and David Malone. Past pupil Eoin Morgan captained the England team to victory in the ICC 12th Cricket World Cup in July 2019.

=== Other activities ===
CUS students have represented Ireland at the World Schools Debating Championships.

The school has a connection with the Society of Saint Vincent de Paul and holds an annual "hamper fund" in order to raise funds to the charity. The school has also arranged student visits and fundraising in support of causes in the Davao Region of the Philippines.

== Past Pupils Union ==
The CUS Union, founded in 1902, is the past pupils association of the school. In June 2002, the organisation was hosted at Áras an Uachtaráin by then President of Ireland Mary McAleese.

Former Taoiseach Bertie Ahern spoke at the school's annual dinner in 2002. Other guest speakers have included Minister for Jobs, Enterprise and Innovation Mary Mitchell O'Connor, and broadcasters Eamon Dunphy and George Hook.

== Notable alumni ==
Former pupils have included:

- Academia
  - Arthur Clery – politician, university professor
  - Robert Dudley Edwards – professor, historian
  - Jeremiah Hogan – academic and president of University College Dublin (1964-1972)
  - John Larchet – composer, UCD's first professor of music
  - Patrick Meenan – President of the Medical Council, helped develop Polio vaccine
  - Joseph Plunkett – poet, scholar, and politician
- Arts, entertainment, and literature
  - David Allen – comedian who briefly attended the school
  - Baz Ashmawy – radio and television host
  - Sebastian Barry – author and playwright
  - Arthur Booth – cartoonist and one of the founders of the Dublin Opinion
  - Francis Brennan – hotelier
  - Joe Dowling – artistic director at several theatres
  - George Desmond Hodnett – musician and music critic
  - Rory Keenan – actor
  - Graham Linehan – writer and director
  - PJ McCall – writer
- Religion and community
  - Austin Darragh – founder of the Irish Cancer Society
  - James Moriarty – Bishop Emeritus of the Diocese of Kildare and Leighlin
- Government and politics
  - John Pius Boland – barrister and politician, winner of Olympic gold medals for tennis
  - Tom Burgess – Newfoundland politician
  - John Dillon – Leader of the Irish Parliamentary Party
  - Frank Feely – former Dublin City Manager
  - Noel Lemass – politician (TD) and son of former Taoiseach Seán Lemass
  - Seán Dublin Bay Rockall Loftus – Lord Mayor of Dublin
  - Patrick Lynch – TD, economist and chairman of Aer Lingus
  - Domhnall Ua Buachalla – 3rd Governor-General of the Irish Free State
- Sports
  - Simon Curley – Irish cricketer
  - Ronnie Delaney – Irish Olympic gold medal winner (athletics)
  - David Kennedy – racing driver
  - David Malone – Paralympic Gold Medal winning swimmer
  - Mick McGrath – Rugby Union player for Leicester Tigers
  - Eoin Morgan – England Cricket captain and former sports scholar of the school
  - Frank Reddy – Irish first-class cricketer
  - Dean Rock – All-Ireland Football Final-winning Gaelic footballer
  - Neil Rock – cricketer
  - Paddy Waldron – first-class cricketer
