= Joseph Rooney (priest) =

Irish missionary priest

Joseph Rooney (d. 1857) was an Irish missionary priest who was instrumental in the founding of a number of educational institutions in India during the period of the Company rule in India. He was killed in a massacre in the Siege of Cawnpore in India, a key episode in the Indian Rebellion of 1857.

== Biography ==
Joseph Rooney was born in Athlumney, County Meath, the son of Lawrence Rooney. He studied Classics at the seminary in Navan, before attending All Hallows College in 1843, as the first student to enter. The college was set up by Meath-born priest John Hand, and Rooney studied to be a missionary priest. He was ordained in May 1847.

The Apostolic vicar of Agra, North India, Joseph Borghi (1839-1849), wrote in 1846 to David Moriarty, president of All Hallows, asking for support: he needed priests to help support the needs of the soldiers there. The Vicariate of Agra encompassed a huge area including the North-Western Provinces, the Punjab, and the Indo-Gangetic Plain, and the Italian Capuchins there ministered to British troops. As a result, in September 1847 Rooney left for Agra, with Rev. Nicholas Barry, and they arrived the next year. Their first job was to assist in setting up schools there; after the establishment of St. Peter's College, Agra, and St Paul's Orphanage, they started the school "for the sons of officers and gentlemen" that later became St. George's College, Agra. Overworked, he was sent to Firozpur, and quickly became a favorite of the military personnel there; they had just sacked Multan Fort, and offered Rooney some of the silver and gold they had stolen, but he declined. Here also he suffered from exhaustion, and while he had permission to return home for a few years, he declined, asked for another mission, and was sent to Kanpur.

Kanpur was the site of a large British garrison, and it became the target of a rebellion let by Nana Sahib, culminating in the 22-day Siege of Cawnpore. Rooney was killed during that siege (a 1930 sermon mentions he was hanged) after ministering to a wounded soldier on 18 June 1857. His death, as well as that of a priest who was killed in Delhi and one who was killed in Lucknow, was described by Monsignor Ignatius Persico, then Apostolic vicar of Agra, in an eyewitness account published in 1858. Persico had befriended Rooney in India, and later visited the ruins of his childhood home in Ireland.

== Family ==
Rooney's younger brother, John Rooney, also studied at Navan and then at Maynooth University. Hand asked him to teach in All Hallows College, and in preparation for that position he studied for two years in Paris at the Society of the Priests of Saint Sulpice. At All Hallows he was appointed Professor of Theology and Sacred Scripture, and after ten years there, in 1863, became parish priest of Drumconrath.
