= Killarney Franciscan Friary =

Monastic establishment in Killarney, County Kerry, Ireland

Coordinates: 52°03′38″N 9°30′16″W

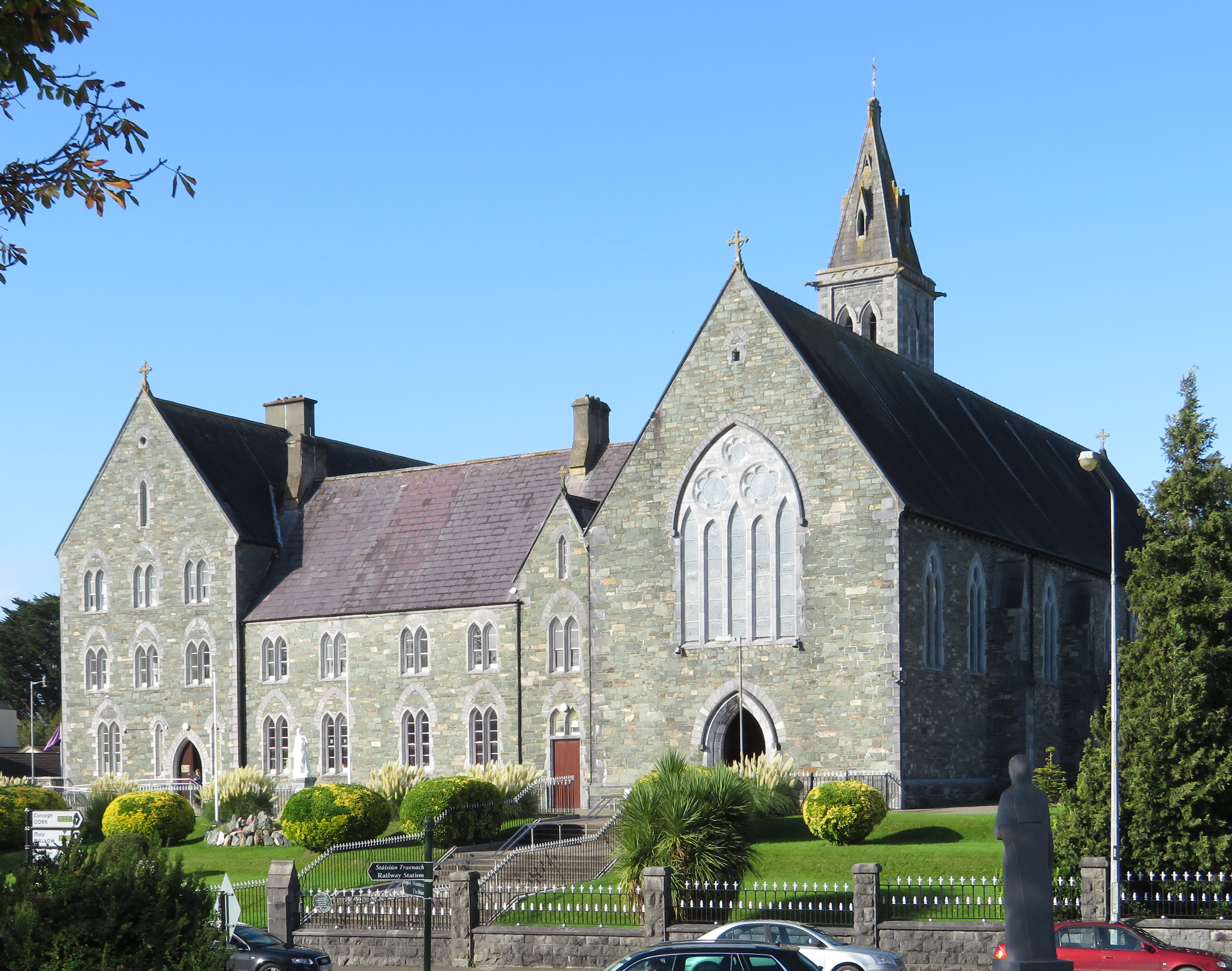
The Franciscan Friary in Kllarney

Killarney Franciscan Friary is a monastic establishment in Killarney, County Kerry, Ireland.

The Franciscan community in Killarney was established in 1860, when Franciscan friars transferred from Gorey, County Wexford, where they had been for two years. The Franciscan church was completed in 1867 and consecrated in 1868, and the friary opened 1879, designed by J.J. McCarthy. The church was consecrated by Bishop David Moriarty (who had laid the foundation stone in 1864) and is dedicated to the Most Holy Trinity, the title of the old Muckross Abbey.

In 1902 the friary became the novitiate house of the Irish Province (which had previously been in Ennis Friary). After completing their year as a novice, students would proceed to St. Anthony's College, Galway, to take an undergraduate degree at University College Galway, often going on to complete their clerical training by studying theology (since the Royal University of Ireland and its successor the National University of Ireland were prohibited from accrediting theology degrees until 1997) in the Irish Franciscan College (St. Anthony's), Louvain or in St. Isidore's, the Irish Franciscan College in Rome.

The Franciscan Friars of Killarney is a 1911 American silent documentary produced by Kalem Company and directed by Sidney Olcott.

The church contains a stained-glass window by the Harry Clarke studios, installed in 1930, designed by Richard King.

In 2009 the Franciscans in Killarney donated one of their buildings, Áras Phádraig, to Kerry County Council for community use, since with the reduction in vocations it was not required by the order. The Franciscans now live in a new house built within the grounds of the church, while the old buildings are used by the Kerry Diocesan Youth Centre.

In 2010 it was announced that Killarney, would serve as postulancy friary (a pre-novitiate year) for the British and Irish Franciscans, today Ennis Friary is the postulancy house for the Irish and British provinces of the Franciscans.

In 2017 Killarney became an inter-provincial novitiate house of the order, training new novices for other Franciscan provinces (including Britain, Germany, Holland, Sweden and Canada, as well as Ireland). Following completion of their novitiate year, candidates make their first profession, and then return to their own country/province, to continue their formation.

== Associated people ==
- Bonaventure Hinwood OFM, academic, educator and Afrikaans poet, first South African member of the Irish Franciscans
- Michael Lenihan OFM, Archbishop of San Pedro Sula
- John Evangelist McBride OFM, Bishop of Kokstad was a novice in Killarney
- Wilfrid Napier OFM, South African Cardinal who was a Novice in Killarney
- Fiachra Ó Ceallaigh OFM, retired Auxiliary Bishop of Dublin
- William Slattery OFM, Irish-born Franciscan Archbishop Emeritus of Pretoria

== See also ==
- List of abbeys and priories in Ireland (County Kerry)
