= Bartholomew Woodlock =

His Grace Bartholomew Woodlock
- Bishop Emeritus of Ardagh and Clonmacnoise; Titular Bishop of Trapezopolis
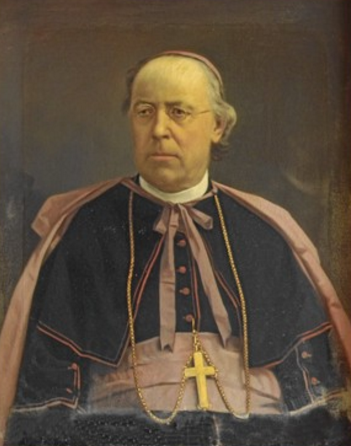
- Appointed: 4 April 1879
- Term ended: 1890
- Predecessor: George Michael Conroy
- Successor: Joseph Hoare
- Other posts: Rector of the Catholic University of Ireland; President of Catholic University School

Orders
- Ordination: 1831-priest, 1877-monsignor, 1879-bishop
- Rank: Bishop

Personal details
- Born: 30 March 1819
- Died: 13 December 1902 (aged 83)
- Buried: St Mel's Cathedral, Longford
- Denomination: Roman Catholic
- Parents: William and Mary (Cleary) Woodlock
- Education: Clongowes Wood College, Roman College, Appolinare Seminary

Philosophical work
- Era: 19th-century philosophy
- Region: Western philosophy
- School: Aristotelianism; Empiricism; Personalism
- Main interests: Faith and rationality Religious epistemology Historical theology Christian apologetics Philosophy of education Classical education

Bartholomew Woodlock (30 March 1819 – 13 December 1902) was an Irish Catholic prelate, philosopher and educator who established the Catholic University School, Dublin and founded the Society of St Vincent de Paul in Ireland. He was the second rector of the Catholic University of Ireland, now University College Dublin, after Cardinal John Henry Newman.

== Early life ==
He was born on 30 March 1819 in Dublin, to William Woodlock and Mary Cleary. His father was a lawyer and associate of Daniel O'Connell. His parents were from Roscrea, County Tipperary. His sister Johanna married Sir Dominic Corrigan, a noted physician.

Woodlock was educated at the Jesuit Day-School, in Dublin and Clongowes Wood College. Thereafter, supported by the archbishop of Dublin and the Jesuits, he entered the Appolinare Seminary in Rome, winning prizes in Theology and Philosophy during his studies, he was awarded the degree of Doctor of Divinity at the age of 22. He joined the staff of All Hallows College in Drumcondra in Dublin, in 1843, which had been just set up by Fr. John Hand, following meeting him in Rome. He served as professor of Dogmatic Theology until 1854, when he was appointed president of the college. He also served as vice-rector and vice president of the College, as well as a priest in the Dublin Diocese.

Woodlock's sister-in-law, the philanthropist Ellen Woodlock, helped establish what became Temple Street Children's University Hospital. She was also the only woman to contribute to the House of Commons select committee meetings on Irish Poor Relief.

== Diocesan work ==
In 1844 he helped set up the first branch of the St Vincent De Paul in Ireland, chairing the first meeting on 14 December 1844. He was appointed spiritual director of the organisation and was active in it up until his appointment as a bishop. Along with the architect J.J. McCarthy and William Nugent he helped found the Irish Ecclesiological Society in 1849.

In 1861, Woodlock was appointed rector of the Catholic University of Ireland, succeeding Cardinal John Henry Newman. He held the position until he was appointed a bishop. In line with Newman's educational philosophy, Woodlock set up the Catholic University School in 1867 as a preparatory school for the Catholic University of Ireland.

Woodlock was appointed monsignor in 1877 and consecrated bishop of Ardagh in 1879 in the Sistine Chapel in Rome by Pope Leo XIII, serving in Longford until 1895 when he reached retirement age and was appointed titular bishop of Trapezopolis.

== Death ==
Woodlock died on 13 December 1902, and is buried at St Mel's Cathedral, Longford. His papers are held in Clonliffe College.

== See also ==
- Diocese of Ardagh and Clonmacnoise (Roman Catholic)
- Catholic University School
- John Henry Newman
- Catholic University of Ireland
- University College Dublin

Catholic Church titles
Preceded by George Michael Conroy	Bishop of Ardagh and Clonmacnoise; 1879–1895	Succeeded by Joseph Hoare
Academic offices
Preceded by Rev. David Moriarty DD	President of All Hallows College, Dublin; 1854–1861	Succeeded by Rev. Thomas A. Bennett DD OCC
Preceded by Cardinal John Henry Newman	Rector of Catholic University of Ireland; 1861–1879	Succeeded by Rev. Henry Neville
