= James Joseph McCarthy =

Irish architect (1817-1882)

- Born: 6 January 1817; Dublin, Ireland
- Died: 28 November 1882 (aged 65); Glasnevin, Dublin, Ireland
- Resting place: Glasnevin Cemetery, Dublin, Ireland
- Occupation: Architect
- Known for: Architect of Gothic Revival ecclesiastical buildings

James Joseph McCarthy (1817-1882) was an Irish architect known for his design of ecclesiastical buildings. McCarthy was born in Dublin, Ireland on 6 January 1817. His parents were from County Kerry. He was educated by the Christian Brothers in Richmond St., and went on to study architecture at the Royal Dublin Society School. He was a follower of the style of the architect Pugin and Gothic Revival. He designed many religious buildings to include convents and 80 churches and cathedrals.

McCarthy served as Professor of Ecclesiastical Architecture at All Hallows College, Dublin. He was also appointed Professor of Architecture at the Catholic University of Ireland and at the Royal Hibernian Academy. McCarthy was a friend of Dr. Bartholomew Woodlock, who had been rector of both All Hallows' and the Catholic University, and he helped Woodlock to found the Irish Ecclesiological Society in 1849. He was also a close friend of Charles Gavan Duffy and was a member of the Young Irelanders.

He died in 1882 and is interred in Glasnevin Cemetery.

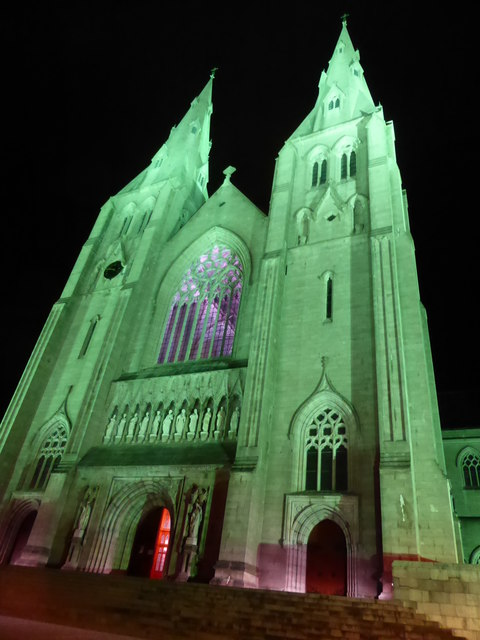
St Patrick's RC cathedral, Armagh, Northern Ireland lit up in green for a St Patrick's Day concert

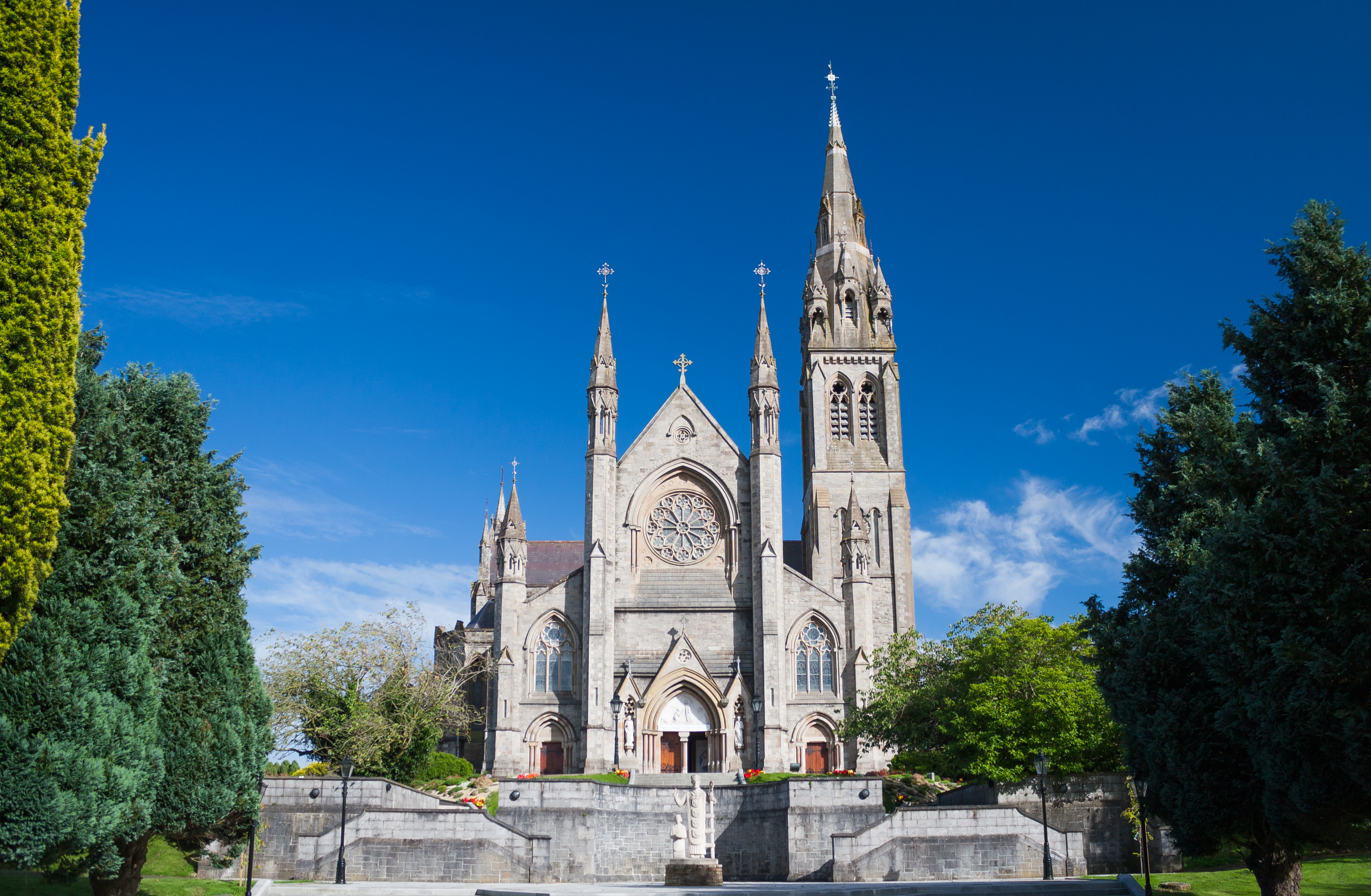
Monaghan Saint Macartan's Cathedral 2016 08 25

== Buildings ==
J.J McCarthy completed over fifty commissions for churches, monasteries, convents and cathedrals.

- Cathedral of the Assumption, Thurles, County Tipperary
- St. Brendan's, Ardfert, County Kerry
- Our Lady of the Immaculate Conception, Ballingarry, County Limerick
- St. Kevins, Glendalough
- St. James's Church, Killorglin, County Kerry
- St. Joseph's, Carrickmacross, Monaghan
- St Macartan's Cathedral, Monaghan
- St. Mary's Church, Dingle, County Kerry
- St. Mary's Parish Church, Maynooth, County Kildare
- St. Mary's Church, Rathkeale, County Limerick.
- St. Patrick's Cathedral, Armagh
- St. Peter and Paul Church, Kilmallock, County Limerick,
- Mortuary Chapel, Glasnevin Cemetery, Dublin
- Killarney Franciscan Friary, County Kerry
- Capuchian Franciscan Church, Church Street, Dublin
- Holy Trinity Church, Cookstown. County Tyrone
- College Chapel, St. Patrick's College, Maynooth, County Kildare
- College Chapel, Clonliffe College, Dublin
- Ladychapel Church, Maynooth, County Kildare
- St. Michael's Church, Ballinasloe, County Galway
- St Patrick's church, Mayobridge
- St Patricks church Dungannon, Tyrone
- St. Saviour’s Dominican Church, Dublin (1861)
- St. Saviour's Dominican Church, Limerick (1870)
