= The Franciscan Friars of Killarney =

1911 film by Sidney Olcott

- Directed by: Sidney Olcott
- Produced by: Kalem Company
- Cinematography: George K. Hollister
- Release date: November 29, 1911
- Country: United States
- Languages: Silent film (English intertitles)

The Franciscan Friars of Killarney is a 1911 American silent documentary produced by Kalem Company. It was directed by Sidney Olcott.

== Production notes ==
The film was shot in Beaufort, County Kerry, Ireland, during summer of 1911, with the friars from Killarney Franciscan Friary.
