= Holy Cross College (Dublin) =

Seminary in Dublin, Ireland

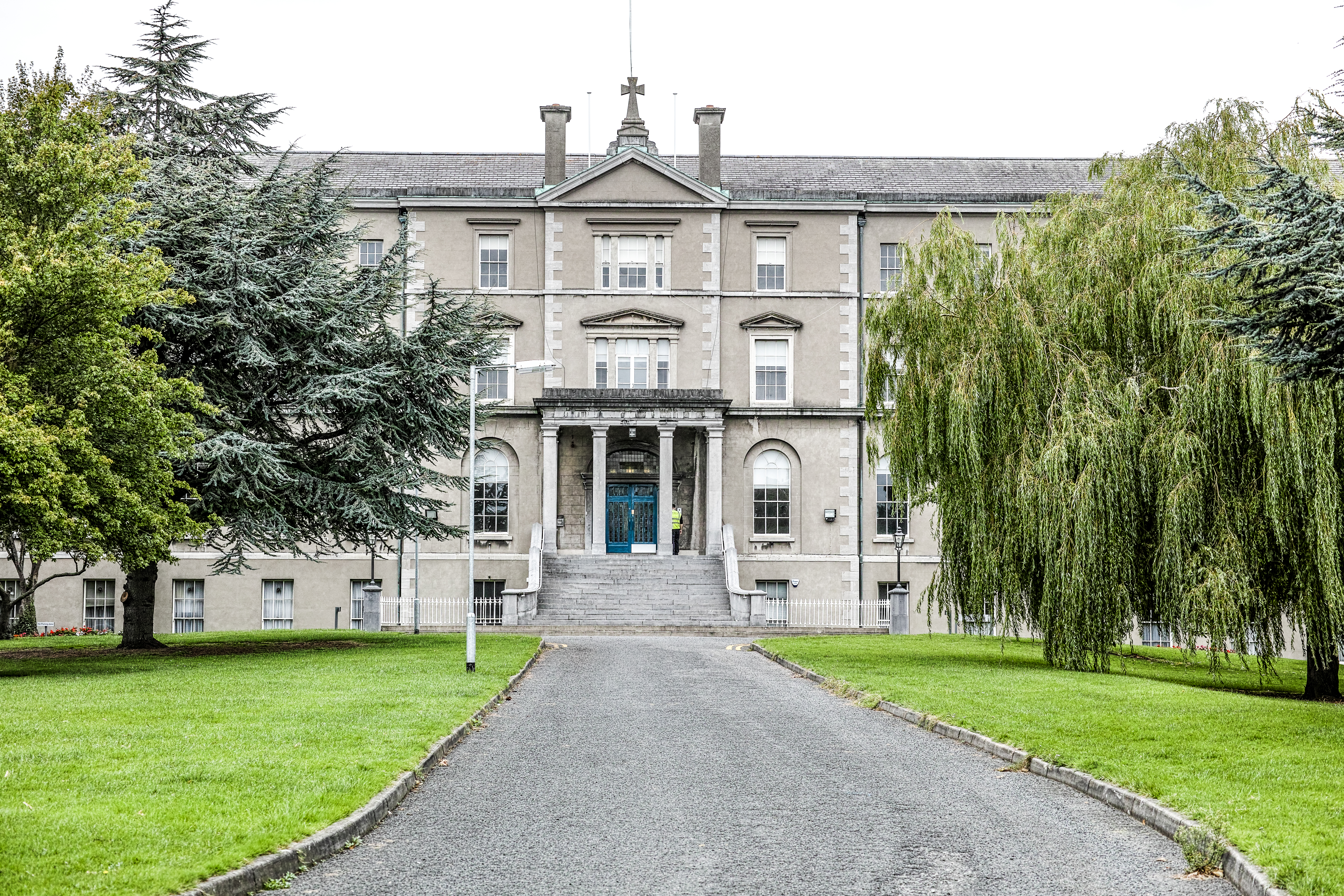
- Type: Roman Catholic; Diocesan Seminary
- Active: 1854–2019
- Affiliations: Archdiocese of Dublin
- Academic affiliations: Catholic University of Ireland (1870–1906); Angelicum Rome (1965–2000); NCEA (1977-1991)
- Location: Drumcondra, Dublin, Ireland; 53.363614°N 6.255598°W
- Nickname: Clonliffe College

Holy Cross College (also known as Clonliffe College), located on Clonliffe Road, Drumcondra, was founded in 1854 as the Catholic diocesan seminary for Dublin by Paul Cullen, Archbishop of Dublin (later created, in 1866, a cardinal).

== History ==
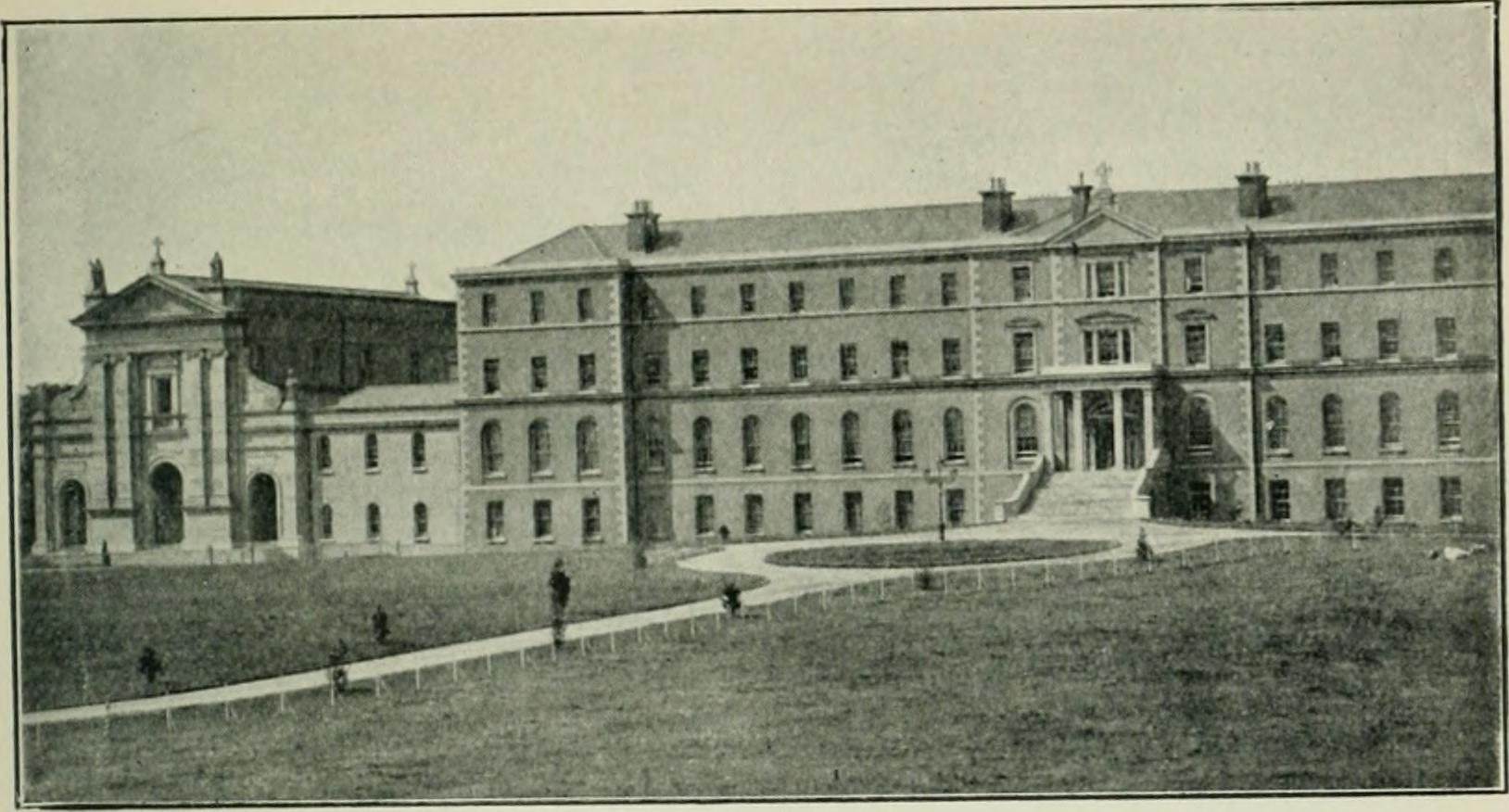
Clonliffe College

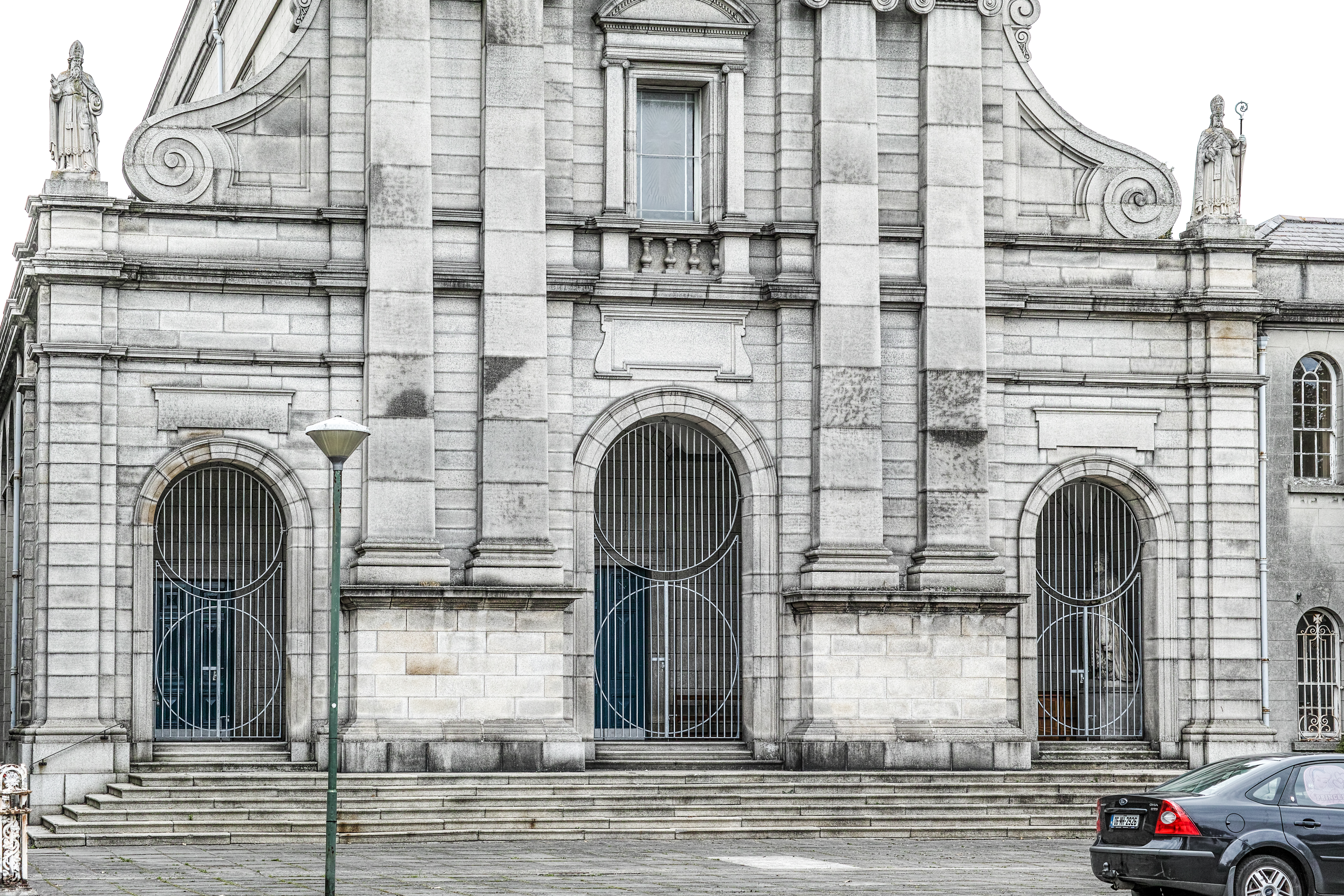
Front of Holy Cross College church

The College was founded in 1859 by Paul Cullen, Archbishop of Dublin, to provide priests for the Archdiocese of Dublin (Cullen became Cardinal Cullen in 1866). In 1861, the Rector of the Catholic University of Ireland, Bartholomew Woodlock, tried to secure land in Clonliffe west to build a new Catholic University; however, this plan was shelved due to the expansion of the railway line. Plans were drawn up by the architect James Joseph McCarthy for the proposed new University, McCarthy designed the college building.

Following the University Education (Ireland) Act 1879, which incorporated the Royal University of Ireland, the Catholic University of Ireland was reconstituted as to comprise all Catholic Colleges including Holy Cross College, Clonliffe. Students would sit exams for the Royal University. Since the royal university was prohibited in awarding degrees in theology, the Catholic University would confer degrees in theology and divinity, such as BD and DD. Between 1881 and 1908, 81 Clonliffe students graduated with a BA from the Royal University of Ireland.

Following the foundation of the National University of Ireland (NUI) in 1908, Clonliffe's seminarians would have also taken studies in University College Dublin (UCD), and many walked in procession between Clonliffe and Earlsfort Terrace, prior to it moving out to Belfield.

In 1882, the Catholic University of Ireland's Library (excluding medical books) was transferred from what became University College, Dublin, to Clonliffe.

In 1965, Holy Cross College, Clonliffe, the Dublin Archdiocesan Major Seminary, was granted power to confer some of the Degrees of the Angelicum University of Rome, students were awarded degrees such as BD or STB from the Angelicum.

For many years two students from the Vincentian studied at Clonliffe so as to have to opportunity to also gain a degree from UCD, there was a strong relationship between the Diocesan College and the Vincentian order, in that some Vincentian priests from the nearby St. Patrick's Training College and All Hallows would have lectured in Clonliffe. The connection with the Vincentians pre-dated Clonliffe in that students for the Dublin Diocese before the foundation of the College would have initially studied with the Vincentians in Castleknock College before completing their studies in Maynooth College.

In 1977, the National Diploma in Philosophical Studies at 2 year programme validated by the NCEA, and eligible for Higher Education grants was run at Clonliffe, this led in subsequent years to NCEA Certificate and Diplomas in Humanities being offered from Clonliffe.

Maynooth University validated a number of diplomas and certificates conducted in Clonliffe over the years. 2001 saw the seminary duties suspended due to a fall in vocations, with students for the priesthood for the diocese being transferred to national seminary in St Patrick's College, Maynooth.

The College was adjacent to Archbishop's House, the official residence of the Archbishop of Dublin, just north of Croke Park Stadium. Clonliffe was the administrative headquarters of the Catholic Archdiocese of Dublin, and was used for retreats, conferences, meetings and courses. The Mater Dei Institute of Education was established in 1966 on part of the Clonliffe College campus, and used some of the resources of the former seminary, such as the sports grounds, until its closure in 2016. A number of Dublin Diocesan bodies were based in Clonliffe College, such as Crosscare, which is located in the Red building. The Drug Awareness Programme, Crosscare, Clonliffe College, ran the Certificate in Addiction Studies, from Maynooth University.

2015 saw the Pathways - Exploring Faith and Ministry adult education course, previously run for 30 years by the nearby All Hallows College, transferred to the Diocesan Centre and delivered in Clonliffe. From 2021 the Pathways programme is being delivered from the Mater Dei Centre for Catholic Education (MDCCE), in DCU St. Patrick's College, Campus.

The library collections of Clonliffe (along with Mater Dei) were transferred into the care of Dublin City University (DCU) Library in 2016.

In 2018, it was announced that the College would be closed by the Archdiocese and sold to the GAA. The sale, according to the Archdiocese, will create

"social, affordable and private housing and sports facilities for children and young adults as well as a hotel and commercial opportunities providing employment for people living in the area."

The College was officially suppressed in May 2019.

The Ukrainian Church in Ireland of Bishop Nicholas the Miracle Worker (Ukrainian Greek Catholic Church) hold services in Holy Cross College, Clonliffe.

In 2022, the Archdiocese of Dublin offered the college buildings to the government to house refugees, and later many items from the College, were auctioned to make space to accommodate refugees from Ukraine, following the conflict there.

== Archives ==
The College houses the archives of Dublin Diocese and other documents such as those of Daniel O'Connell's Catholic Association and Repeal Association and religious artefacts. The archive contains the papers of eleven Archbishops of Dublin, a number of auxiliary bishops and of Bartholomew Woodlock the second president of the Catholic University of Ireland. The College participated in Culture Night 2013 where its archives and artwork were on display to the general public, as well as recitals of music and a talk on the 1913 Lockout.

== People associated with Clonliffe College ==
The founder of the college, Paul Cardinal Cullen, was buried there. Following the sale of the property, in 2021 his body was reinterred in St Mary's Cathedral. Columba Marmion (1858–1923) was a professor of metaphysics. Archbishops Dermot Ryan, Diarmuid Martin and Cardinal Archbishop Desmond Connell attended Clonliffe College, along with numerous priests who have served in the Dublin Diocese in particular. Also many church and academic figures such as Pádraig de Brún studied at Clonliffe. The independent Catholic Bishop Pat Buckley was a seminarian in Clonliffe from 1970 to 1973

In 1917, Constance Markievicz was baptised into the Catholic Church at Clonliffe College.

A number of public figures such as poet Denis Devlin and former TD, government minister and Mayo football captain Seán Flanagan, were seminary students at Clonliffe.

Presidents of the College have included Bishop Thomas Joseph Power (1859–1870), Michael Verdon (1870–1879), Canon Bartholomew Fitzpatrick, John Waters (1915-1921), Matthew S. MacMahon, Patrick Dargan, Jerome Curtin, Edward Gallen (1952-1955), Cathal McCarthy (1955-1964), Joseph Carroll (1964-1968), also president of Mater Dei, Brendan Houlihan, Owen Sweeney, John J Greehy (1980–1983), and Peter Briscoe (1989-2000).

Bishop Eamon Walsh served as Dean of Clonliffe College from 1977 to 1985.
