= Henry Neville (priest) =

Henry Francis Neville (1822 – 15 December 1889) was an Irish Catholic priest and educator who served as rector of the Catholic University of Ireland and Dean of Cork.

== Biography ==
Neville was educated for the priesthood at St. Patrick's College, Maynooth, where he was ordained on 29 May 1847. He was to join the teaching staff at the college, in 1850 becoming the Professor of Philosophy and in 1852 Professor of Theology until 1867 when he retired from Maynooth on health grounds, becoming a Parish priest in Monkstown and Passage West, Co. Cork.

During his time in Monkstown, Neville was responsible for the building of the Church of the Most Sacred Hearts of Jesus and Mary. He was also awarded the title of Canon.

He provided advice to a number of Irish Bishops at the Vatican Council. He also published his response to William Ewart Gladstone, in A few Comments on Mr. Gladstone's Expostulation in 1875.

In 1879, Neville, Dean of Cork was appointed (succeeding Dr Bartholomew Woodlock) as Rector of the Catholic University (while rector he still retained his role as Parish Priest at St. Finbarr's, Cork) he held the Rectorship until 1883 when he was succeeded by Dr. Gerald Molloy. Also in 1883, he was elevated to the title of Monsignor by Pope Leo XIII. He died in 1889.

== Publications ==
- A few Comments on Mr. Gladstone's Expostulation by Neville, Canon Henry, McGlashan & Gill, Dublin (1875).

Academic offices
Preceded by Rev. Bartholomew Woodlock DD	Rector of Catholic University of Ireland; 1879–1883	Succeeded by Rev. Gerald Molloy
