= All Hallows College =

College of higher education in Dublin, Ireland

- Coláiste na Naomh Uile
- Educational video about the house and college
- Former name: All Hallows Missionary College
- Motto: Euntes Docete Omnes Gentes
- Motto in English: Go and teach all nations (Matthew 28:19)
- Type: Private Roman Catholic
- Active: 1842–2016
- Affiliations: NCEA (1988-1999)); DCU (1999-2016)
- Chairman: Dermot McCarthy
- President: Patrick McDevitt, C.M., Ph.D.
- Students: 700
- Location: Drumcondra, Dublin, Ireland; 53.370886°N 6.249418°W
- Campus: Suburban
- Website: www.allhallows.ie

All Hallows College was a college of higher education in Dublin. It was founded in 1842 and was run by the Vincentians from 1892 until 2016. On 23 May 2014, it was announced that it was closing because of declining student enrollment. The sale of the campus in Drumcondra to Dublin City University was announced on 19 June 2015 and completed on 8 April 2016. The college closed on 30 November 2016, becoming the All Hallows Campus of Dublin City University.

== History ==
The college was founded in 1842 by Reverend John Hand and, from 1892 until its closure in 2016, was under the direction of Vincentians.

By 1973, the college had trained 4000 priests for England, Ireland, Wales, Scotland, South America, South Africa, India, Canada, Australia, the West Indies, New Zealand, and the United States. All-Hallows alumni were the largest group of secular priests in California up to the late 1890s.

The name of the Monastery may also originate from the fact that the lands it was built upon once belonged to the much older monastic foundations of the Priory of All Hallows owned by the Augustinians and founded by Diarmaid mac Murchadha in 1166, but later dissolved under the Reformation. The general area of Drumcondra back then was commonly known as Clonturk or Ceann Torc of North, Dublin.

The academic training for a priest took seven years, of which three were devoted to physics, mental philosophy, languages, and English literature; the remaining four years were devoted to sacred scripture, history, liturgy, canon law, sacred eloquence, and the science of theology.

Up until 1891, the college was run on a voluntary basis, not under any particular Catholic body, following a number of disputes with the hierarchy and Cardinal Cullen, over the administration of the College, and increased nationalism in the college following on from the Land League and Home rule movements, following intervention from the pope, the Vincentians were placed in charge of the college.

The church organ was built in 1898 by Telford & Telford of Dublin.

After its establishment in 1909, some students would take examinations for the National University of Ireland, as some students had previously done with its predecessor the Royal University of Ireland from 1936 All Hallows students attended UCD's Earlsfort Terrace for their degree courses.

In autumn 1955, while on holiday in Ireland, Senator John F. Kennedy addressed students of All Hallows at the invitation of Fr. Joseph Leonard. His speech referred to the suppression of religion in the Soviet bloc.

=== After the Second Vatican Council ===
In the 1960s, after the Second Vatican Council, the college began accepting women from religious orders and also all Lay Students, offering adult education, and certificates, degrees and diplomas in theology, humanities and pastoral studies.

In 1976, the Vincentian retreat and conferencing in St. Joseph's, Blackrock, moved to Purcell House, All Hallows. Similarly, in 1981 the Vincentian Mission Team moved to the College, from Blackrock, resulting in All Hallows being where missionaries returned to stay.

In 1982 the Diploma in Pastoral Leadership course commenced. The Pathways - Exploring Faith and Ministry adult education course for the dublin diocese commenced in 1985.

In 1984, the Dominican College Girls Secondary school, Eccles St., transferred to a new school built on the northern part of All Hallows College lands, on Griffith Avenue.

The BA degree, a four-year programme in Theology with Philosophy, Psychology or Spirituality was validated by the Irish governments NCEA in 1988. In 1991 the Evening BA and MA by Research began, which was followed in 1993 by the taught MA programme.

In 1992 during the 150th anniversary of the foundation of the college, the All Hallows Association was set up by Pastmen former students of the college who had not proceeded to ordination. Also in 1992 the Sabbatical Renewal Programme commenced.

In 1997 in association with the National Adult Literacy Agency (NALA), the Dept. of Education, and WIT, the first Certificate in Training and Development Adult Basic Education Management was run in All Hallows.

The final two ordinations took place in 1998 and the College ceased to be a seminary.

In 1999, the colleges degree programmes were validated by Dublin City University following on from NCEA. The undergraduate degrees based on subjects were recognised by the teaching council entitling graduates to teach in secondary schools in Ireland.

From 2003 to 2015, Preparing for Ministries, a version of the Pathways programme in All Hallows, was provided on an outreach basis, at various locations in the Diocese of Clogher.

In 2008, the college, as with the Mater Dei, and St Patrick's College, Drumcondra, became a college of Dublin City University.

In 2009 MA in Ecology and Religion run by the Missionary Society of St. Columban moved to the college and in 2012 the MA in Applied Spirituality moved from the Milltown Institute began being delivered by All Hallows.

In 2012, the International Peace Bureau conference was held in All Hallows, where President Michael D. Higgins presented the Sean McBride Prize.

In 2018 the All Hallows Alumni Network was set up to continue the connection between graduates of the college.

== Courses ==
All Hallows College was home to programmes that provided students with the skills to promote fairness and equality in the workplace and in society: leadership and management in the pastoral arena, the community and voluntary sector and on all dialogue between public policy and social justice. Programmes were held in spirituality, supervisory practice and ecology and their application to questions and issues about the meaning of life that came up in work settings, therapeutic settings, family settings, relationships or in the context of social issues. The college enrolled 700 students.

The college offered joint major undergraduate degree courses (where the student's two subjects were both considered majors and could both to be used as a basis for employment) in a combination of Theology and either Psychology, English Literature or Philosophy. These were offered under the Free Fees scheme that operates in Irish third-level education. Degree options were also available excluding Theology. In those instances, students applied directly to the college and paid full fees. The undergraduate degree courses were available to school leavers via the Dept. of Education's Central Applications Office (CAO), yet about 50% of first-year students were mature students (aged 23 and over).

The college offered postgraduate programmes in Social studies such as Social Justice and Public Policy, Management: Community and Voluntary Services, Leadership and Pastoral Care, Christian Spirituality, Supervisory Practice and Ecology and Religion. Most of these taught courses had a graduate certificate and diploma stages prior to the MA stage. The college also offered research master's and doctoral studies. All of the master's and doctoral programmes were entitled to tax relief under the government scheme.

In 2017, the President of All Hallows College in conjunction with Dublin City University launched a strategic plan for the future called the Aisling (Vision) program in order to modernize the courses on offer in the college and also develop a stronger academic and resource links with its new partner institute, Dublin City University.

All Hallows ran adult and community learning courses.

As part of the reaction to the closure of the aerospace company in Dublin Airport under the European Globalisation Adjustment Fund (EGF) a tailored degree course was provided in All Hallows for some 70 former employees.

=== Public talks ===
The college ran a series of public talks each autumn and spring on subjects relating to the church, its mission and social justice, the 2015 spring series was entitled "Reading the Signs of the Times - Urgent Questions for the Church today", with speakers including Archbishop Diarmuid Martin and Fr. Peter McVerry SJ. Previous subjects have included "Vatican II : The Journey Continues" and "The Joy of the Gospel: Evangelii Gaudium Exploring the Teaching of Pope Francis".

=== Graduation ===
Graduation took place every year on campus. The final graduation, 1 November 2016, was presided over by the vice-president, Mary McPhillips and the president of Dublin City University, Brian McCraith. Following the ceremony, a reception was held for graduates and their friends and families in the college dining hall.

== Exchange programmes ==
The college engaged in the Erasmus student exchange programmes with Liverpool Hope University as well as the universities of Trier and Erfurt in Germany. All Hallows ran study abroad programmes with American universities such as DePaul University in Chicago and St. John's University (New York) both also founded by Vincentians. The college also engaged in programmes with Webster University, St. Louis; the University of Missouri and Regis University, Denver.

== Facilities ==
The college had a dining room, student common room, computer room, the John Hand library and study facilities. Students could use the facilities in Dublin City University and its sister colleges. Students had access to online learning via moodle. An archive of the college was hosted on campus. The college had on-campus accommodation for visiting students and groups. The Purcell House building hosted seminars, conferences, and workshops.

A number of non-profit organisations and charities such as Volunteer Missionary Movement, Daughters of Charity Education and Training Service, Ruhama (Supporting women affected by prostitution and human trafficking), Accord Catholic Marriage Counselling, Debt and Development Coalition Ireland, Console (Living with Suicide), Migraine Association of Ireland, National Association for Pastoral Counselling and Psychotherapy, Marys Meals, and Older Women's Network (OWN) Ireland were based on campus.

On campus there is a monument to Fr. Hand and a graveyard where he and a number of other former presidents, professors and students of the college are buried. Deceased former students and staff are commemorated by trees planted on the college grounds.

The College Chapel was often used for concerts by choirs and musical societies, such as Liam Lawton, Dolce Choir, The Offbeat Ensemble, and the Dublin Airport Singers.

On 22 December 2003, the college hosted a special Christmas edition of RTÉs Marian Finucane Show with choirs for the northside of Dublin, and featured Brian Kennedy, Suzanne Murphy, Anúna, Bernadette Greevey and the Three American Tenors.

The BBC Songs of Praise show on 20 March 2016, featured a recording of Enya singing in the college chapel.

== People associated with All Hallows ==
Along with the founder Fr. Hand, over the years a number of eminent people had taught at or been associated with All-Hallows Dr. Bartholomew Woodlock(became Rector of the Catholic University of Ireland), Dr. David Moriarty, Dr. Michael Flannery, Dr. Eugene O'Connell, Dr. George Michael Conroy(Professor of Dogma, 1857 to 1866), Dr. James McDevitt, Dr. Sylvester Barry, Dr. Thomas A. Bennett, Monsignor James O'Brien (St. John's College, Sydney), and Dr. Patrick Delany (Hobart), have gone on to leading positions in the Catholic Church or other educational institutions. Two other noted professors at the college were the converts from Anglicanism Father Thomas Potter, and Mr. Henry Bedford MA.

The architect and designer of churches in Ireland James Joseph McCarthy was Professor of Ecclesiastical Architecture at the college. The organist and composer Vincent O'Brien served as Professor of Gregorian Chant from 1903.

=== Presidents of All Hallows College ===
Rev. David Moriarty became president following the death of Fr. Hand in 1846, other presidents have included Dr Woodlock, the carmelite Dr. Thomas A. Bennett D.D. O.C.C. (1803–1897), the Very Rev. Dr William Fortune (1834–1917), Rev. Thomas O'Donnell CM and more recently Fr. Kevin Rafferty CM and Mgr. Tom Lane CM (served from 1970 to 1982). Fr. Mark Noonan C.M. (serving from 1996 to 2011) he was succeeded in 2011 by the first foreign and the final president of All Hallows College, Dr. Patrick McDevitt, C.M., PhD, a Vincentian priest, from DePaul University in Chicago, Illinois.

The term rector has also been used in the past for the head of the college.

- Rev. John Hand (1842–1846)
- Rev. David Moriarty DD (1846–1854)
- Dr. Bartholomew Woodlock DD (1854–1861)
- Rev. Thomas A. Bennett DD, OCC (1861–1866)
- Dr. William Fortune (1866–1891)
- Rev. James Moore (1892–1909)
- Rev. Thomas O'Donnell CM (1909–1948)
- Rev. William Purcell CM (1948–1961)
- Rev. Thomas Fagan CM (1961–1970)
- Mgr. Tom Lane CM (1970–1982)
- Rev. Kevin Rafferty CM (1982–1995)
- Rev. Mark Noonan CM (1996–2011)
- Dr. Patrick McDevitt CM PhD (2011–2016)

=== Notable alumni ===
- Frances Black, singer and senator (Diploma in Addiction Studies, 2006)
- Catherine Byrne, former Dublin Lord Mayor and TD (Lay Ministry)
- J. Kevin Boland, Bishop of Savannah,
- John Brady Auxiliary Bishop of Boston.
- David Cremin Titular Bishop of Cunga Féichin, Auxiliary Bishop of Sydney, Australia.
- George F. Dillon, priest, Missionary Apostolic in Australia, co-editor (with Roger Vaughan) of The Express Catholic newspaper (of Australia), and famous theological and anti-Masonic writer
- Patrick Joseph Dillon, priest, Argentine politician, and founder The Southern Cross newspaper.
- Peter Fallon, studied in All Hallows from 1915 to 1918 before becoming a Columban priest, murdered in 1945 by Japanese forces
- Matthew Gibney, Bishop of Perth
- Father William Gleeson linguist and California church historian.
- John J. Glennon, Archbishop of St. Louis
- Edward Joseph Hannan, founder of Scottish football club Hibernian F.C., in Edinburgh.
- David G. O'Connell, murdered Auxiliary Bishop of Los Angeles, 2015–2023
- Edward Patrick Roche, Archbishop of St. John's, Newfoundland (1915-1950).
- Fr. Joseph Rooney (ord. 1847) killed in a massacre in Siege of Cawnpore, India, in 1857.
- John Francis Sherrington, appointed 2011, Auxiliary Bishop. Archdiocese of Westminster (Archdiocese of Westminster)
- John Tuigg, third bishop of Pittsburgh

== Buildings ==
The college's main buildings were the historic Drumcondra House designed by Sir Edward Lovett Pearce for Marmaduke Coghill, Purcell House, O'Donnell house, and Senior house. The architect J. J. McCarthy extended the house and designed a college quadrangle, however, only two sides were built. The college chapel was designed by George Ashlin in 1876, replacing an earlier chapel by McCarthy, the south side of the chapel is dominated by Evie Hone's stained glass window.

- Drumcondra House - original Georgian house which the college was built around.
- Purcell House - Conference Centre and Oratory. Originally known as Junior House designed by architect J.J. O'Callaghan in 1884.
- O'Donnell House opened in 1958
- Woodlock Hall - Now the location of the Jesuit library from the Milltown Institute of Theology and Philosophy
- John Hand Library
- Senior House
- College Chapel
- Temple Folly (1720)

== Winding down ==
On 23 May 2014, it was announced that the College activities would be winding down due to financial difficulties, these were brought to the fore following a fundraising effort which included the sale of letters from Jackie Kennedy was cancelled. The College was not in receipt of direct state funding, and was capped at how many students it could accept on the Irish government's free fees scheme. The winding down affected academic programmes in the short term, but a sabbatical course ran in 2014 and before and after Easter 2015. Efforts were made, liaising with DCU and its Colleges, to maintain the Adult Learning BA (ALBA) degree programme, which is the only one of its kind in Ireland. In September 2014 the College announced it was seeking a partnership or a sale of the campus to facilitate this, hoping to retain a presence on the campus and continue its mission. Since 2015 the adult education Pathways programme has been run by the Dublin Dioceses Centre in Clonliffe College. The final Faith Renewal programmes ran during the 2015 to 2016 academic years.

=== All Hallows College Festival Week ===
All Hallows College Festival Week was held in July 2016, to mark the transition of the All Hallows Campus to DCU, and to celebrate the legacy of the College, featuring events such as a garden party, fun day and open day with tours, exhibitions and lectures and a mass celebrated by Archbishop Diarmuid Martin.

=== Programme Transfer ===
A number of the courses and programmes taught in All Hallows have been transferred to other institutions

- BA in Adult Learning for Personal and Professional Development (ALBA) was transferred to DCU
- MA in Personal Leadership and Pastoral Care is now being run by the National College of Ireland
- MA in Spirituality is being run from 2016 in the Spirituality Institute for Research and Education (SpIRE) validated by WIT
- MSc in Non Profit Management is being run in the National College of Ireland
- Pathways programme, transferred to Clonliffe College in 2015, and from 2021 the Mater Dei Centre for Catholic Education (MDCCE), in DCU St. Patrick's, Campus.
- Sabbatical Renewal Programme run by the Presentation Sisters in Portarlington

== DCU All Hallows Campus ==
The DCU School of Theology, Philosophy, and Music is based on the All Hallows Campus. The DCU Church of Ireland Centre (CIC), is based on the campus. Since 2015, following storm damage to their school, the local Rosmini Community (secondary) School, which caters for Visually Impaired students, has been housed temporarily on the campus. As part of the sale agreement for the college, a new primary school for the area was to be built on the college lands.

=== DCU Church of Ireland Centre (CIC) ===
The Church of Ireland Centre maintains the ethos of the Church of Ireland College of Education following its incorporation into DCU. In 2022, the original Church of Ireland Training College, Kildare Place, altar furniture was moved to and rededicated in All Hallows Chapel, by the Archbishop of Dublin Michael Jackson, for use by Church of Ireland Centre and community there.

=== Jesuit DCU Partnership ===
The DCU Jesuit Library Partnership saw the Jesuit Library Milltown Park move to Woodlock Hall at All Hallows Campus, where the Theology faculty is based. The library consists of 140,000, theology and philosophy books, and is described as a ten-year loan.

== All Hallows Trust ==
Following the winding down of the college, the All Hallows Trust was set up to maintain the legacy and heritage of the college, and continue with a number of activities. Continued activities by the trust were enshrined in the agreement to sell the college to DCU. The Trust maintains an office on campus. The All Hallows trust supports a number of academic activities such as the publication of books and papers on the college and Vincentian tradition, it also manages the All Hallows Trust PhD scholarships. It also supports the All Hallows Association and the All Hallows Alumni Network(AHAN) for events such as the annual Jubilee Mass, and the annual advent mass (continuing on from the college carol service). The Trust also supported the meeting of alumni in the Passionist Retreat Centre near Sacramento, California, in May 2022. Other events the trust support include book launches and talks.

== See also ==
- Kimmage Mission Institute
- Milltown Institute of Theology and Philosophy
