= St. George's College, Agra =

St. George's College Agra
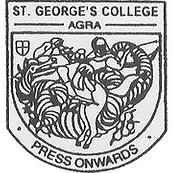

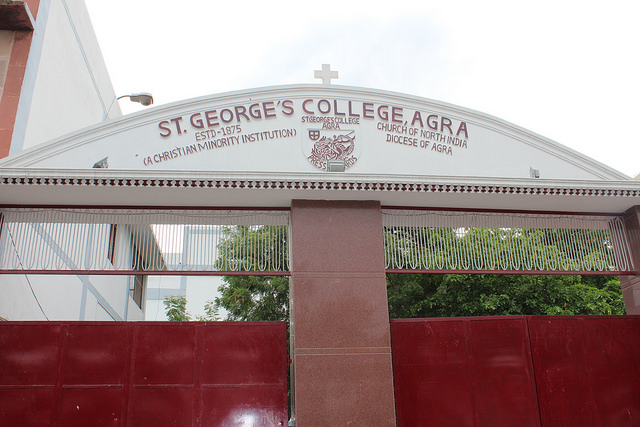
- Main Gate

Location
- 3 Garden Road, Baluganj, Agra, Uttar Pradesh; Agra, Uttar Pradesh, 282001; India
- Coordinates: 27°09′57″N 78°00′57″E

Information
- School type: Co-Educational
- Motto: Press Onwards (Move Forward)
- Religious affiliation: Cristian
- Founded: 23/04/1875
- Founder: Joseph Rooney
- Status: Open
- School board: ISC [Class XII] ICSE [Class X]
- Authority: Diocese of Agra, Church of North India (CNI)
- School code: UP001
- Principal: Mr. Akshay R.S. Jeremiah
- Head teacher: Dr. Elsa Phillips
- Classes: 15
- Classes offered: Pre- Nursery to XII
- Language: Hindi, English
- Hours in school day: 6 Hrs. (Monday - Friday); 3 Hrs. (Saturday)
- Campus size: 40 acres (160,000 m2) approx.
- Houses: Saunders (Red); Robinson (Green); Clifford (Yellow); Wescott (Blue)
- Color: Maroon
- Yearbook: The Georgian
- Affiliation: ISC [Class XII], ICSE [Class X]
- Website: https://www.stgeorgescollegeagra.com/
- Last updated: 29-08-2025

St. George's College, Agra, is one of the oldest convent schools in India. It is a Minority Anglo-Indian Christian Institution granted Minority Rights under Article 30 of the Indian Constitution. It is located near Mall Road and near to Targhar. The campus is approximately 40 acres (160,000 m^{2}).The students are widely named as Georgians in the city. The school is accredited under the Indian Certificate of Secondary Education board for grade 10th and under the Indian School Certificate board for Grade 12. The school was established in 1875 as an Army School for British Armed Forces at Agra. With the passing by of time it started admitting students from civilian background as well. The college originated in a school set up by Father Joseph Rooney, an Irish priest from Navan, in the late 1840s. Rooney later founded St Peter's College, a Catholic boys school in Agra.

== Headmasters and principals ==
=== Headmasters ===
- Edward W. Maylor (1875 - 1882)
- G. H. Johnson (1888 - 1894)
- Rev. L. F. Philips (1895 - 1910)
- S.T. Rollo (1895 - 1910)
- Rev. Ben Colton (1911 - 1912)
- Rev. F. H. Smith (1913 - 1915)
- Norman H. Tubby (1916 - 1919)
- Rev. N. Rose Burnett (1920 - 1923)
- H. A. Phillips (1924 - 1926)

=== Principals ===
- T. D. Ayo (1926 - 1933)
- Capt. M. C. Ellis (1933 - 1934)
- E. C. Ellis (1943 – 1946)
- Maj. M. C. Ellis (1946 – 1947)
- I. Montes (1947 – 1948)
- Richard Stephen Law (1949 - 1970)
- B. Roberts (1970 - 1972)
- A. R. David (1973 - 1979)
- I. V. Phillips (1980 - 1992)
- J. S. Jeremiah (1992-2022)
- Akshay R.S. Jeremiah (2022–Present)
