= Gerald Molloy =

Irish theologian and scientist

Gerald Molloy (born at Mount Tallant House, near Dublin, 10 September 1834; died at Aberdeen, 1 October 1906) was an Irish Catholic priest, theologian and scientist.

== Life ==
He was educated at Castleknock College, and subsequently went to Maynooth College. Here he applied himself to theology and the physical sciences.

He was barely 23 when in 1857 he became professor of theology at Maynooth, and continued to hold that chair until 1874, when he accepted the professorship of natural philosophy at the Catholic University of Ireland. In 1883 he succeeded Dean Henry Neville of Cork as Rector of the Catholic University of Ireland, which office he occupied up to the day of his death.

He acted on the commission on manual training in primary schools, and filled the post of assistant commissioner under the Educational Endowments Act. As early as 1880 he became a member of the Senate of the Royal University of Ireland, and remained so till 1882, when he was appointed to a fellowship in the same university. In 1890 he became a member of the governing board of that institution and at the time of his death was its vice-chancellor. He was also a member of the Board of Intermediate Education.

As a lecturer and skilled experimentalist, Molloy was very successful in dealing with scientific subjects and rendering them intelligible and interesting. Under the auspices of the Royal Dublin Society, of whose council he was a member, he delivered a series of lectures on natural science, and in particular on electricity. On one occasion he joined issue on the subject of lightning conductors with Sir Oliver Lodge.

At the time of his death, he was representing the Catholic University at the celebration of the fourth centenary of Aberdeen University, and was one of those on whom the honorary degree of Doctor of Laws at Aberdeen was conferred a few days before.

== Works ==
Among his works are:

- "Geology and Revelation" (1870), a fuller treatment of a series of papers on geology in its relation with revealed religion, which appeared from time to time in the Irish Ecclesiastical Record;
- Outlines of a course of Natural Philosophy (1880);
- Gleanings in Science: popular lectures on scientific subjects by Gerald Molloy D.D., D.Sc., London & New York, Macmillan and Co., (1888);
- Notes on Electric Lighting, by Gerald Molloy (M. H. Gill and Son);
- The Irish Difficulty, Shall and Will by Gerald Molloy (Blackie & Son), (1897).

He also translated a number of passages from Dante's Purgatorio, wrote of the Passion Play at Oberammergau, and was a frequent contributor to magazines.

Academic offices
Preceded by Henry Neville	Rector of Catholic University of Ireland; 1883–1906	Succeeded by Patrick O"Donnell
