= Austin Darragh =

Irish doctor and charity founder

- Born: 27 April 1927; Dublin, Ireland
- Died: 4 October 2015 (aged 88); Hill of Tara, Ireland
- Resting place: Rathfeigh Cemetery; County Meath; 53°35′28.857″N 6°29′18.47″W
- Education: Catholic University School; Trinity College
- Occupations: Practitioner; Entrepreneur; Broadcaster; Writer
- Years active: 1954–2002
- Known for: Irish Cancer Society
- Spouses: Terry Roddy (m. 1950–1992); Anna Longdon (m. 1998–2015)
- Children: 5; including Paul

Austin Darragh (27 April 1927 – 4 October 2015) was an Irish medical practitioner, entrepreneur, broadcaster and writer. He is notable for being the sole founder of the Irish Cancer Society in 1963, and being the radio doctor on The Gay Byrne Show.

== Early life and history ==
Darragh was born on 27 April 1927 to a teaching father, and he spent most of his childhood life in the Terenure residential area of Dublin. He was educated at the Catholic University School on Leeson Street, Dublin and graduated from Trinity College in 1954. He met Marie Therese "Terry" Roddy while studying in college, they married in 1950 and had five children. In 1992, Roddy died from cancer.

Darragh was also a professor in the University of Limerick for a number of years focussing on biomass. He married Anna Longdon in 1998, and was married to her until his death late 2015.

=== 1987 kidnapping ordeal ===
In 1987, Darragh's son-in-law John O'Grady, who was a dentist, was kidnapped by Dessie O'Hare's gang. The gang had intended to seize Austin himself, but Darragh had moved three years previously from the house, which was occupied by O'Grady. Due to O'Hare demanding a ransom of IR£1.5m and not getting it, O'Hare chopped O'Grady's pinky finger on each hand with a hammer and chisel.

=== Death ===
Darragh died at his home, Tara Beg located near the Hill of Tara in County Meath, on 4 October 2015, aged 88. He was buried in a plot at Rathfeigh Cemetery where his son and wife are also buried near his residence.
