= Thomas A. Bennett =

Irish Carmelite priest

Thomas A. Bennett D.D. O.C.C. (1803–1897) was an Irish Carmelite priest, who served as provincial of the order, and also as president of All Hallows College, Dublin.

Thomas Albertus Bennett (sometimes called Albert Bennett) was born at Arless, County Laois in 1803, he entered the Carmelite order and went to study in University of Louvain, Belgium. Dr. Bennett, served as a chaplain in the South Dublin Union, and was appointed provincial in 1852, he founded a day school and seminary in Dominick Street, Dublin in 1854, and Terenure College was also founded during his tenure as provincial of the order. He served as provincial until 1864 when he was succeeded by Fr. Spratt. Dr. Bennett taught at the Missionary All Hallows College, serving as president of the college from 1861 until 1866, he spent over 30 years as a professor at the college. He retired to Terenure College, where he died, on 2 November 1897.

Academic offices
Preceded by Rev. Bartholomew Woodlock DD	President of All Hallows College, Dublin; 1861–1866	Succeeded by Rev. Dr. William Fortune
