= Fiachra Ó Ceallaigh =

Irish Roman Catholic bishop (1933–2018)

Styles of Fiachra Ó Ceallaigh
- Reference style: The Most Reverend
- Spoken style: Your Grace
- Religious style: Bishop
- Posthumous style: not applicable

Fiachra Ó Ceallaigh, O.F.M. (18 August 1933 – 29 July 2018) was an Irish Roman Catholic bishop. On 17 September 2009, he retired as an Auxiliary Bishop Emeritus of Dublin.

== Life ==
Ó Ceallaigh was born in Lissycasey, Ireland, and trained at the Franciscan Novitiate in Killarney. He studied Irish and Celtic studies at UCG, and also gained a Higher Diploma in Education. He also studied in Louvain and in Rome. He was ordained a priest in Rome on 2 July 1961 in the Order of Friars Minor. He was appointed to Gormanstown College. He studied for a Social Science degree in UCD, and a Masters in Queens University Belfast. His father Seán Ó Ceallaigh was elected a Fianna Fail TD for County Clare in a by-election 1959.

He was appointed an Auxiliary Bishop of Dublin, and, at the same time, Titular Bishop of Tres Tabernae by Pope John Paul II on 7 June 1994, at the age of 61. Prior to his appointment as bishop, he had been provincial of the Franciscan Order in Ireland and was the first Franciscan to become a bishop in Ireland for over 170 years. Bishop Ó Ceallaigh served the Irish Bishops' Conference as a member of its Department of Worship, Pastoral Renewal and Faith Development, as Chairman of the Irish Language Commission, and as a member of the Commission for Religious and the Commission on Pastoral Liturgy.

As an Auxiliary Bishop, he assisted Archbishops of Dublin Desmond Connell and Diarmuid Martin in the governance of the diocese. Bishop Ó Ceallaigh sent his letter of resignation at the age of 75 as he is required to do. Pope Benedict XVI accepted his letter of resignation on 17 September 2009 but did not name another auxiliary bishop to replace Ó Ceallaigh.

Upon his resignation being accepted Archbishop Martin said: "Bishop Fiachra’s warmth and particular personal qualities enriched our work. I, the priests, and no doubt the people of Rialto and his episcopal area are at one in praying that he find enjoyment in his retirement." He said Bishop Ó Ceallaigh, "particularly as he struggled with illness in recent years, was an outstanding witness to the motto he took on his episcopal appointment, Dia Ár Misneach (God is our courage)". He died in Dublin.
