= O'Donnell House (Ireland) =

Educational building in Dublin, Ireland

O'Donnell House was built in Drumcondra in honour of the memory of Fr. Thomas O'Donnell (1864–1949), who served as president of All Hallows College from 1920 to 1948, and is now a part of the expanded campus of Dublin City University. It was originally part of the former All Hallows College, created in 1842 by Fr. John Hand (1807–1846), and run by the Vincentians order of priests as a seminary to educate future Roman Catholic missionaries to serve abroad. That college closed in 2016, and the premises became the All Hallows Campus of Dublin City University, a university established in Glasnevin, Dublin, since 1989.

In the late 1950s, Fr. William Purcell, then President of All Hallows, commissioned a building to honour his predecessor, Fr. Thomas O’Donnell, C. M. O’Donnell had been renowned for a book he wrote in 1910 on the ideals and duties of priests., and for his biography of Fr. John Hand.

On 20 May 1958, the 112th anniversary of the death of Fr. Hand, O’Donnell House was inaugurated by the Archbishop of Dublin, John Charles McQuaid. The building, constructed as a modern example of Irish monumental Palladian architecture, was used for primarily for lectures. It also provided residential accommodation on the upper floors for student clerics.
