= Thomas Joseph Potter =

Catholic priest and Professor of Pulpit Eloquence and English Literature

Thomas Joseph Potter (1828–1873) was a British priest, educator and writer of hymns.

Potter was born on 9 June 1828 in Scarborough, Yorkshire, England. In 1847 he became a Roman Catholic and became a priest. He was Professor of Pulpit Eloquence and English Literature at All Hallows College, Dublin. He published several books on preaching, some stories and various hymns and translations such as a translation of the Vesper hymns.

He died on 31 August 1873 in Dublin, Ireland.

== Hymns ==
- "Brightly gleams our banner"

== Publications ==
- Legends, Lyrics, and Hymns, by T. J. Potter, 1862.
- Holy Family Hymns, contributions from Thomas Potter,1860.
- The Rector's Daughter or Love and Duty: A Catholic Tale by Thomas J. Potter, Published by James Duffy and printed by Moore & Murphy, Dublin, 1861.
- Sacred Eloquence, or, the Theory and Practice of Preaching by Thomas J. Potter, Dublin, 1868.
- The Pastor And His People: Or The Word Of God And The Flock Of Christ by Thomas J. Potter (1869)
- The Spoken Word: Or The Art Of Extemporary Preaching, Its Utility, Its Danger, And Its True Idea by Thomas J. Potter (1872)
- The Farleyes of Farleye or Faithful and True "A tale in three books" by Thomas J. Potter 1884
