= Henry Bedford (educator) =

English Catholic educator and writer

- Born: 1 October 1816
- Died: 21 May 1903 (aged 86); Dublin, Ireland
- Burial place: All Hallows College Cemetery, Dublin
- Education: St. Peter's College, Cambridge (MA)
- Occupations: writer, educator
- Known for: attached to the Oxford Movement; Professor of Natural ScienceAT All Hallows College in Dublin
- Notable work: Life of St. Vincent de Paul

Henry Bedford (1816–1903) was an English Catholic convert formerly attached to the Oxford Movement, was an educator and writer of many Catholic leaflets.

== Biography ==
He was born in London on 1 October 1816. In 1835 he went to St. Peter's College, Cambridge where he obtained an MA in Arts and Science. He went to train as a priest in the Church of England serving as assistant curate in Christ Church, Hoxton, and was noted as a preacher. In 1851 converted to Catholicism and in 1852 he moved to Ireland after an offer to join to staff of All Hallows College in Dublin where he lectured as Professor of Natural Science, he also served as treasurer and joined the board of directors. A natural defect in his right hand was a canonical obstacle to his ordination into the church. He continued to teach, and write and be published on a variety of subjects, and also lecture publicly.

Famed as a preacher he was invited to lecture speak and many occasions, such as a guest speaker at the laying of the foundation stone of the new chapel in Maynooth College, he also lectured at St. Patrick's Teacher Training College, Drumcondra, on English Literature.

He died on 21 May 1903, in the nursing care of St. John of Gods Brothers in Stillorgan in Dublin, and is buried in All Hallows College Cemetery.

== Publications ==
- Life of St. Vincent de Paul by Henry Bedford M.A., published by Burns and Oates, 1883.
- The churchman's pulpit, sermons by eminent clergymen of the English Church By Church of England Churchman includes a Sermon by Rev. Henry Bedford M.A.
