= Diocese of Antigonia =

Roman Catholic titular see

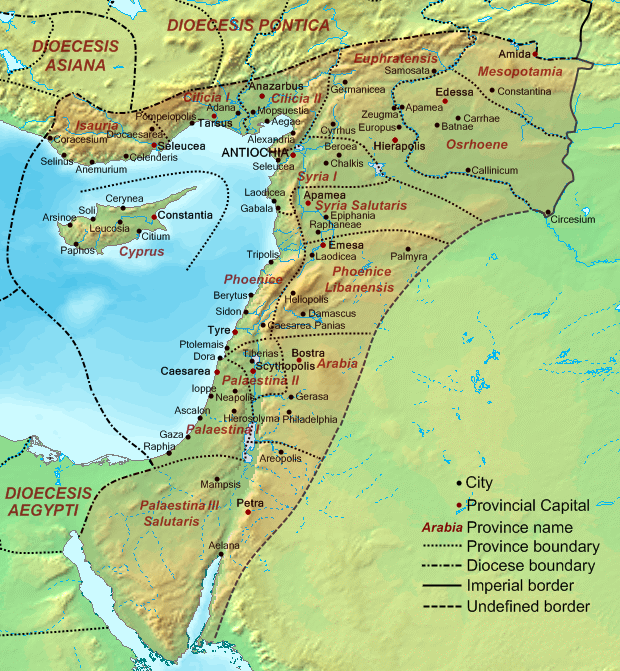
Dioecesis Orientis 400 AD.

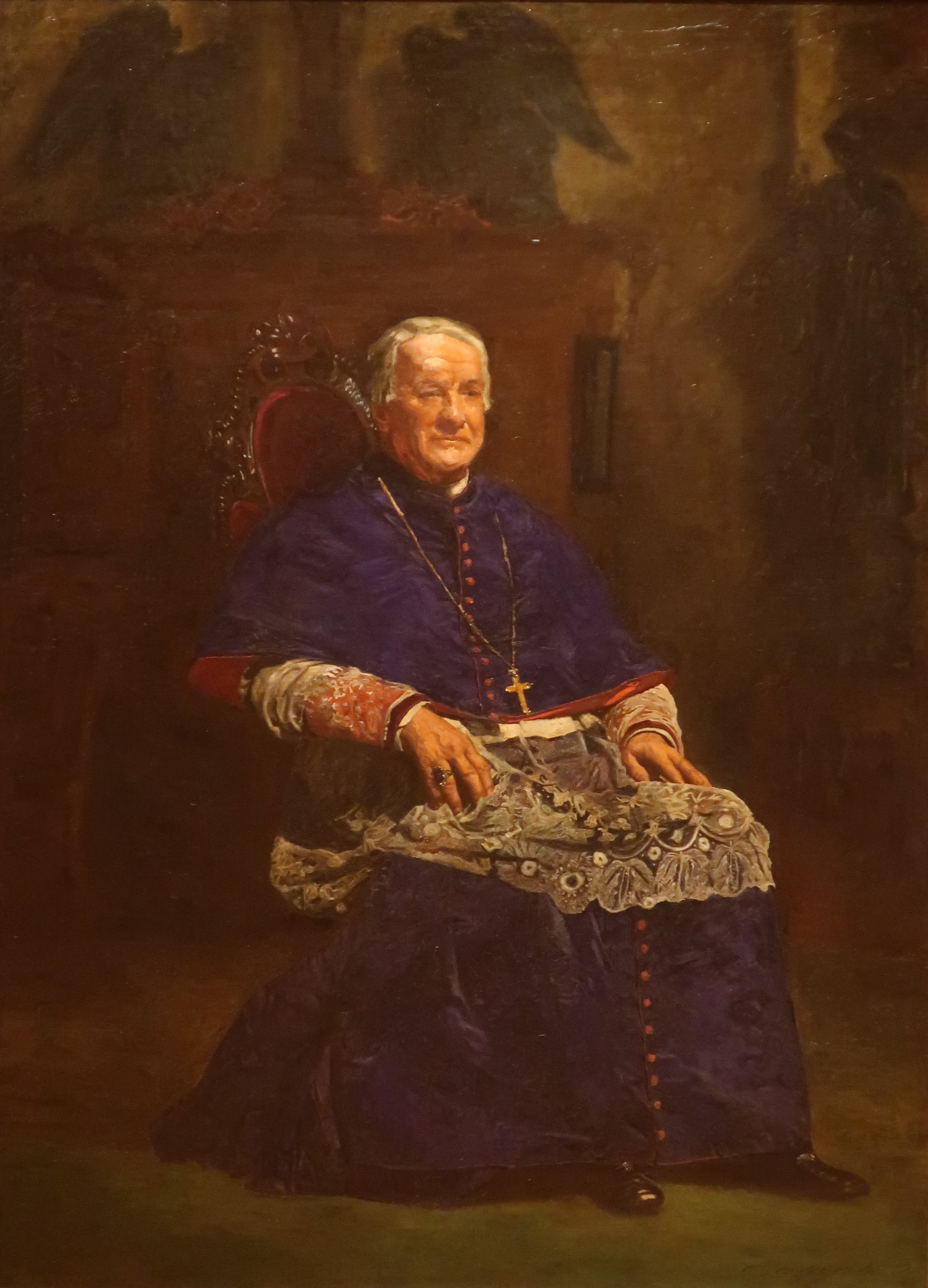
James Wood

The Diocese of Antigonea is a suppressed, titular see of the Early Christian Church. The ancient city of Antigoneia in Syria was the seat of the bishopric of the diocese, where the following bishops are known to have sat.

== Bishops ==
- Joseph Heinrich von Braitenbücher (12 April 1728 – 24 February 1749)
- Georg Franz Lock (22 May 1801 – 7 September 1831)
- Tomás Miguel Pineda y Saldaña (3 July 1848 – 10 March 1853)
- David Moriarty (8 March 1854 – 22 July 1856; succeeded, Bishop of Kerry)
- James Frederick Wood (9 January 1857 – 5 January 1860; succeeded, Bishop of Philadelphia, Pennsylvania)
- Thomas Grimley (18 December 1860 – 29 January 1871)
- Jean-Claude Duret, C.S.Sp. (26 August 1873 – 29 December 1875)
- Marchie-Jean-Gustave Blanc, (17 April 1877 – 21 February 1890)
- Giulio Marchsili (12 August 1890 – 28 July 1911)
- Theodorus Antonius Leonardus Marchia van Roosmalen, (23 August 1911 – 9 June 1957)

== See also ==
- Catholic Church in Syria
