= William Gleeson (priest) =

Irish Roman Catholic priest, missionary, linguist and historian

William Gleeson (29 January 1827 – 29 January 1903) was an Irish Roman Catholic priest, missionary, linguist and historian.

== Biography ==
Gleeson was born 29 January 1827 in County Tipperary, Ireland, and was privately educated before entering All Hallows College at Drumcondra north of Dublin to prepare for missionary service. He was ordained in 1853.

Soon after his ordination, Gleeson volunteered for service in India and was sent to Agra under the supervision of Ignatius Persico. He was placed in charge of a nearby congregation at Saldana, where he learned Hindustani and the Persian language from his parishioners.

Gleeson was at Agra when it was taken by Tantya Tope during the Indian Rebellion of 1857, and subsequently served as a chaplain to Catholic soldiers in the British Army. It was in this capacity that he became acquainted with Colin Campbell, 1st Baron Clyde and Sir James Outram, 1st Baronet.

Unfortunately, a few years after peace was restored, a serious illness nearly deprived Gleeson of his voice and convinced him to leave India to accept a teaching position at Vincentians' College at İzmir in Turkey. There he learned Arabic.

Gleeson was eventually invited to spend a year doing missionary work in the Diocese of Salford in England, and three years in Glasgow, Scotland. But, the climate in those two places disagreed with him, and he accepted a calling to teach ancient languages at St. Mary's College of California by 1870.

It was while teaching in San Francisco that Gleeson wrote his most famous work: History of the Catholic Church in California. It was published in 1872, a year after he had resumed parochial work in East Oakland, Fruitvale, and Alameda, California.

Gleeson continued to enjoy learning foreign languages as a pastor, including the Portuguese language of his parishioners and the Hebrew and Syro-Chaldaic writings he studied.

He died on his 76th birthday, 29 January 1903, having suffered a stroke four days earlier while preparing for late Sunday Mass at St. Anthony's Church. His funeral was held there on 31 January, with burial following at nearby St. Mary's Cemetery.
