= Irish Cancer Society =

National charity in Ireland

- Cumann Ailse na hÉireann
- Formation: 10 October 1963; 63 years ago
- Founder: Austin Darragh
- Founded at: Dublin, Ireland
- Type: Private limited by guarantee
- Registration no.: CHY5863
- Purpose: Eliminating cancer
- Location: Dublin, Ireland
- Coordinates: 53°20′5″N 6°14′16″W
- Budget: €20 million (2016)
- Staff: 150 (2016)
- Volunteers: 1,000 (2016)
- Website: www.cancer.ie
- Formerly called: Conquer Cancer Campaign

The Irish Cancer Society (formerly known as the Conquer Cancer Campaign) is the national charity in Ireland dedicated to eliminating cancer as a major health problem, and improving the lives of those who have cancer.

== History ==
=== Foundation of the society ===
The Society was founded on October 10, 1963, as Conquer Cancer Campaign by Austin Darragh, a general practitioner, and is 94% financed by voluntary contributions from the public. It is the largest voluntary funder of cancer research in Ireland. The four strategic goals of the Society's current strategy statement (2013–2017) surround improving the lives of those affected by cancer, reducing the risk of cancer, influencing public policy on cancer and leading excellent collaborative research. The Society is governed by a board of directors composed of leading medical, scientific and business persons. The Board is also advised by a number of expert committees. In 1992, the Irish Cancer Society and the Irish Heart Foundation co-founded ASH Ireland to promote smoking cessation.

=== Education ===
In the area of education, the Society provides educational bursaries to nurses who undertake the Higher Diploma in cancer and Palliative Care Nursing. The Irish Cancer Society is also committed to the continuing education of non-specialised nurses caring for cancer patients through a five-day educational programme which is intended as an introduction to the concept of cancer nursing.

== Daffodil Day ==
The largest single fund-raising activity of the Irish Cancer Society is the annual Daffodil Day. It is responsible for 20% of all income. The first Daffodil Day in Ireland was held in 1988 and was led by President of the Irish Cancer Society, Professor Austin Daragh and the CEO, Tom Hudson. Charles Cully had been President of the Society from 1984 to 1987 and he was inspired by the Canadian Daffodil Day. Daffodil Day has been held in Ireland every year since and it has become a major annual event. In 2008 approximately 4 million euro was collected. The Daffodil became the logo of the Irish Cancer Society in 2001 and has also become the Canadian Cancer Society logo. In effect it is becoming an international symbol for Cancer and Daffodil Days are now held in the US, Australia and other countries. It started in 1957 when a volunteer in Canada by the name of Fran Shannon, started selling Daffodils to collect money during a fundraising event for the CCS.

=== Funding ===
The Irish Cancer Society has several sources of income, with Daffodil day providing 20% of their funds as of 2013. In 2025, the charity has 21 charity shops throughout the country.

The money raised by the Irish Cancer Society is spent on research, providing information, support and services, increasing cancer awareness, keeping cancer at the top of the Government agenda and funding fundraising events.

- A free National Cancer Helpline with a team of specialist cancer nurses offer support and advice
- Free home-care nursing service
- Night Nursing for families who are nursing a seriously ill relative with cancer at home
- Hospital based cancer liaison nurses
- Child psychology and play therapy services
- Cancer Nurse Education

=== Dell main sponsor ===
Since 2011, Dell is the main corporate sponsor for Daffodil Day. Many Dell employees from the Dell offices in Cherrywood and Limerick support the event. In 2012, over 500 Dell employees in Ireland supported the campaign, on the day itself, but also in the weeks before by assisting the Society in their Dublin based warehouse to send out the merchandise to all companies and organisations that support Daffodil Day.

=== Impact of the COVID-19 pandemic ===
In 2020 and 2021, due to COVID-19 restrictions in Ireland, Daffodil Day became a virtual event. The Irish Cancer Society stated that it suffered a fall in charitable donations of €2M over the course of the pandemic, with a drop of 50% in funds raised during Daffodil Day 2020.

== Shave Or Dye Campaign ==
Today FM's 'Shave Or Dye' Campaign helps raise funds for the Irish Cancer Society. The Campaign's instigator, Gill Waters was presented with a People of the Year Award in 2012 for her work with this campaign. The annual fundraiser is now called 'Dare to Care'.

== Irish Redhead Convention ==
The Irish Redhead Convention is a three-day festival that started in 2010 and occurs annually in late August in the Irish town of Crosshaven. The festival serves to raise money for the Irish Cancer Society and includes events such as carrot tossing, games, red-head themed films, and markets. While the event is meant for red heads to unite, it is open to people of all hair colours and even includes events like red hair dyeing. The event was cancelled in December 2016.
