= Catholic University of Ireland =

Former private university in Ireland (1854–1909/1911)

- Ollscoil Chaitliceach na hÉireann
- Seal
- Latin: Catholica Universitas Hiberniae
- Motto: Sedes Sapientiæ Ora Pro Nobis
- Motto in English: [Our Lady] Seat of Wisdom, Pray for Us
- Type: Private
- Active: 1854–1909
- Affiliations: Society of Jesus (1883–1909)
- President: Fr William Delany SJ (1883–1888)
- Rector: John Henry Newman (1854–1861); Bartholomew Woodlock (1861–1879); Henry Neville (1879–1883); Gerald Molloy (1883–1906); Patrick O'Donnell (1906–1911)
- Location: Dublin, Ireland
- Campus: Urban

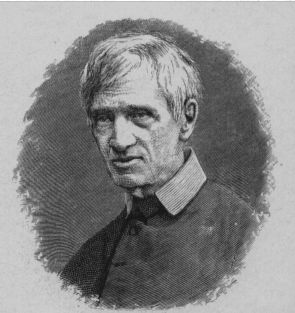
Despite the international reputation of the founding Rector, John Henry Newman, the university failed to attract sufficient funding and students before 1880.

The Catholic University of Ireland (CUI; Irish: Ollscoil Chaitliceach na hÉireann) was a private Catholic university in Dublin, Ireland. It was founded in 1851 following the Synod of Thurles in 1850, and in response to the Queen's University of Ireland and its associated colleges which were nondenominational; Cardinal Cullen had previously forbidden Catholics from attending these "godless colleges".

== Establishment ==
After the Catholic Emancipation period of Irish history, the Archbishop of Armagh attempted to provide for the first time in Ireland higher-level education both accessible to followers of the Catholic Church and taught by such people. The Catholic Hierarchy demanded a Catholic alternative to the University of Dublin / Trinity College, whose Anglican origins the Hierarchy refused to overlook. The Hierarchy also wanted to counteract the "Godless Colleges" of the Queen's University of Ireland – established in the cities of Galway, Belfast and Cork. The University of Dublin had since the 1780s admitted Catholics to study; a religious test, however, hindered the efforts of Catholics in their desire to obtain membership of the university's governing bodies. Thus, in 1850 at the Synod of Thurles, it was decided to open in Dublin – especially for Catholics – a new institution. The Synod findings were supported by Pope Pius IX and the Holy See gave approval in 1852, and then issued a papal encyclical on 20 March 1854 supporting the establishment of the university.

On 18 May 1854 the Catholic University of Ireland was formally established, with five faculties – of law, letters, medicine, philosophy and theology – with John Henry Newman (later Cardinal) as the Rector. Lectures commenced on 3 November 1854, with the registration of seventeen students, the first being Daniel O'Connell, grandson of the notable Catholic politician Daniel O'Connell.

In 1856 the University Church opened.

As a private body, the Catholic University was never given a royal charter, and so was unable to award recognised degrees, and suffered from chronic financial difficulties. Newman left the university in 1857, after which the school went into a serious decline. Bartholomew Woodlock was appointed Rector in 1860 and served until he became Bishop of Ardagh and Clonmacnoise in 1879.

In 1861, Dr Woodlock tried to secure land for a building near Holy Cross College Clonliffe, the establishment to be known as St. Patrick's University. Plans were drawn up by an architect, J. J. McCarthy, and a foundation stone laid. Cardinal Cullen was against the idea of educating lay and clerical students on the same premises. However this plan was shelved because of the expansion of the railway line, and a church and monastery was built on the site. Under the name St. Patrick's University night classes were advertised by the university, under Dr. Woodlock's name

Some feeder secondary schools were established for the CUI. The nearby Catholic University School was joined by St. Flannan's College, Ennis in County Clare (in 1862) and Catholic University High School in Waterford.

In 1863 the CUI awarded its first Doctorate of Divinity to James Vincent Cleary (Professor and later President of St. John's College, Waterford, and future Bishop of Kingston, Canada), using its papal charter to award theological degrees.

In 1880, the Royal University of Ireland was established. The Royal University's charter entitled all Irish students to sit the Universities examinations and receive its degrees. The university was renamed as University College – Dublin in 1882.

== Recognition ==
The Catholic University was neither a recognised university so far as the civil authorities were concerned, nor an institution offering recognised degrees. Newman had little success in establishing the new university, though over £250,000 had been raised from the laity to fund it. Though they held the foundation money as trustees, the hierarchy in 1859 sent most of it to support an Irish Brigade led by Myles O'Reilly to help defend Rome in the Second Italian War of Independence.

Newman left the university in 1857. According to Lytton Strachey

Eventually he realised something else: he saw that the whole project of a Catholic University had been evolved as a political and ecclesiastical weapon against the Queen's Colleges of Peel, and that was all. As an instrument of education, it was simply laughed at; and he himself had been called in because his name would be a valuable asset in a party game. When he understood that, he resigned his rectorship and returned to the Oratory.

Subsequently, the school went into a serious decline; in 1879 only three students had registered. The situation changed in 1880 when the recognised Royal University of Ireland came into being and students of the Catholic University were entitled to sit the Royal University examinations and receive its degrees.

After the 1880 reforms the Catholic University consisted of a number of constituent colleges, including St Patrick's College, Maynooth and Cecilia St. Medical School (see below), with much of the original university then merging into another of its colleges, University College, Dublin. Following the 1879 Act all Catholic Colleges including Carlow College, Holy Cross College and Blackrock College (The French College) came under the Catholic University. Subsequently, other schools/seminaries such as St. Kieran's College, Kilkenny, St Ignatius College SJ Temple St., Dublin, and the Carmelite College, Terenure became affiliated to the Catholic University and hence the new Royal University.

University College was passed to the control of the Jesuits in 1883, when it housed the faculties of the Catholic University except for medicine.

== Catholic University Medical School ==
The Catholic University Medical School commenced lectures for medical students in November 1855 (one year after the Catholic University of Ireland was founded), in Cecilia Street, Dublin. The recognition of its graduates by chartered institutions (the RCSI) ensured its success, unlike the associated Catholic University. This ensured that the medical school became the most successful constituent college of the Catholic University and by 1900 the medical school had become the largest medical school in Ireland. In 1880 it formally became part of the Catholic University of Ireland, (students now sitting examinations with the Royal University of Ireland) when Francis Quinlans MD(Univ. Dubl.), F.R.C.P.I., Professor of Materia Medica and Pharmacy, was also Dean of the Faculty at Cecilia Street, the CUI was renamed University College Dublin in 1882.

The 1908 reforms reconstituted the Catholic University Medical School as the Faculty of Medicine of University College Dublin, with Dr. D. J. Coffey, M.B.(RUI), a graduate of the medical school and Professor of Physiology, Catholic University Medical School, succeeded William Delany SJ becoming the first president of UCD following the creation of National University of Ireland. In 1931 the School moved to Earlsfort Terrace.

Sir Christopher Dixon served as Dean from 1900 to 1905 when he was succeeded by Dr. Coffey.

In 1897 Dr. Eva Jellett a member of the Church of Ireland attended lectures in Cecilia Street, since Trinity College (of which her father was Provost) did not admit women to study, she transferred to Trinity in 1904 when women were allowed to study there. Similarly the Doctor and Anglican missionary Marie Elizabeth Hayes was studied in Cecilia St.

== National University of Ireland, 1909 ==
In 1909, the Catholic University essentially came to an end with the creation of the National University of Ireland, with University College Dublin as a constituent; however, the Catholic University of Ireland remained a legal entity until 1911. In 1915, the NUI awarded honorary doctorates to a number of former students of the CUI.

== See also ==
- List of modern universities in Europe (1801–1945)
