= David Moriarty =

Irish Roman Catholic bishop and pulpit orator

The Most Reverend David Moriarty
- Bishop of Ardfert and Aghadoe
- Diocese: Ardfert and Aghadoe
- Appointed: 18 February 1856 (coadjutor)
- Installed: 22 July 1856
- Predecessor: Cornelius Egan
- Successor: Daniel McCarthy
- Other post: Bishop of Antigonea (8 March 1854 - 22 July 1856)

Personal details
- Born: 18 August 1814 Ardfert, County Kerry, Ireland
- Died: 1 October 1877 (aged 63)
- Denomination: Catholic Church
- Parents: David Moriarty and Bridget Stokes
- Education: St Patrick's College, Maynooth; Irish College in Paris; All Hallows College

David Moriarty (18 August 1814 – 1 October 1877) was an Irish Roman Catholic bishop and pulpit orator.

== Biography ==
=== Background ===
Moriarty was born in Derryvrin, Lixnaw, County Kerry on 18 August 1814, the son of David Moriarty, and Bridget Stokes. He received his early education in a classical school of his native Diocese of Ardfert and Aghadoe, and later was sent to Boulogne-sur-Mer in northern France. From there he passed to Maynooth College, and after a distinguished course in theology was elected to the Dunboyne establishment, where he spent two years.

=== Clerical activities ===
While yet a young priest he was chosen by the episcopal management of the Irish College in Paris, as vice-president of that institution; which position he occupied for about four years. So satisfactory was his work that, on the death of Father Hand, he was appointed President of All Hallows missionary college in Dublin, and for years guided, fashioned, and made effective the discipline and teaching of that well known institution. It was during this time he gave evidence of the noble oratory, so chaste, elevated, various and convincing, that has come to be associated with his name. As president of All Hallows Dr. Moriarty was interviewed about All Hallows, for the Report in 1855 for the British governments Maynooth Commission.

In 1854 he was appointed coadjutor, with the right of succession, to the bishopric of Ardfert and Aghadoe, as titular Bishop of Antigonea; and two years later succeeded to his native see. His work as bishop is testified to by several churches and schools, a diocesan college St. Brendan's, Killarney in 1860 and many conventual establishments. He found time to conduct retreats for priests and his addresses which have come down to us under the title "Allocutions to the Clergy" are characterized by profound thought, expressed in an elevated and oratorical style.

=== Support for the British Empire ===
In his political views he ran counter to much of the popular feeling of the time, and was a notable opponent of the Fenian organization, which he denounced strongly, particularly following the uprising in 1867 in his diocese where in an infamous sermon he attacked the Fenian leadership brandishing them criminals, swindlers and God's heaviest curse. He also declared that "when we look down into the fathomless depth of this infamy of the heads of the Fenian conspiracy, we must acknowledge that eternity is not long enough, nor hell hot enough to punish such miscreants." However, he claimed to admire Daniel O'Connell.

While most republicans attempted to work around the hostility of the high clergy of the Roman Church and the fire and brimstone rhetoric of the likes of Moriarty, out of sensitivity to the religious tendencies of the Irish majority, one Fenian by the name of John O'Neill, dared to fire back. O'Neill retorted “It is better to be in hell with Fionn than in heaven with pale and flimsy angels" (referencing the 12th century Acallam na Senórach on Oisín's arguments with St. Patrick).

== Works ==
His principal works are: "Allocutions to the Clergy" and two volumes of sermons.

He died on 1 October 1877.

Academic offices
Preceded by John Hand	President/Rector of All Hallows College, Dublin; 1846–1854	Succeeded by Bartholomew Woodlock DD
