= John Hand (priest) =

Irish priest

Fr. John Hand (1807–1846) was an Irish priest and the founder of All Hallows College in Dublin.

John Hand was born Bolies, near Oldcastle, County Meath in August 1807, to Luke and Margaret (née Fox) Hand. His family suffered eviction.

He went to school at Navan Seminary some eight miles walk from where he lived; he excelled in his studies, winning a competition for entry to Maynooth, started his priestly studies in Maynooth College in August 1831, but left in 1835 to join the Vincentians in St. Peter's, Phibsborough, Dublin, under Dean Philip Dowley, who had left Maynooth in 1833 to set up the Vincentians in Dublin.

Fr. Hand was ordained a priest on 13 December 1835, by the Rt. Rev. William Clancy in the private chapel of St. Vincent's Seminary at Castleknock.

He visited Lyon in France, and was inspired by the organisation for the propagation of the faith to set up a missionary college in Dublin. He returned to Dublin and set up in 1842 All Hallows Missionary College, in Drumcondra, renting Drumcondra House north of the Tolka river, the lands were owned by Dublin Corporation at the time, and Daniel O'Connell who was Mayor at the time assisted Fr. Hand in getting the lands. He served as the college's first president.

He died aged 38, in May 1846, after suffering a lung haemorrhage some weeks earlier, and is buried in All Hallows Cemetery, in the college grounds, he was survived by his parents. His younger Brother Luke Hand also became a priest serving in Bathhurst, New South Wales, Australia, commencing his clerical training in All Hallows in 1846, shortly before John died.

Academic offices
Preceded by None	President/Rector of All Hallows College, Dublin; 1842–1846	Succeeded by Rev. David Moriarty DD
