= List of France women's national under-21 rugby union team matches =

The following is a list of France women's national under-21 rugby union team matches. The team was formally known as known as the France women's national under-20 rugby union team.

== Match list ==
Won	Lost	Draw

=== Competitive matches ===
Date	Opponent	PF	PA	Venue	Competition	Refs
4 July 2024	Wales U20	57	12	Stadio Sergio Lanfranchi	2024 Six Nations Women's U20 Summer Series	
9 July 2024	Scotland U20	69	10	Stadio Sergio Lanfranchi	2024 Six Nations Women's U20 Summer Series	
14 July 2024	England U20	72	21	Stadio Sergio Lanfranchi	2024 Six Nations Women's U20 Summer Series	
5 July 2025	Italy U20	46	5	Centre for Sporting Excellence	2025 Six Nations Women's U20 Summer Series	
11 July 2025	Ireland U20	41	12	Centre for Sporting Excellence	2025 Six Nations Women's U20 Summer Series	
17 July 2025	England U20	52	39	Centre for Sporting Excellence	2025 Six Nations Women's U20 Summer Series	
18 April 2026	Wales U21	76	5	Cardiff Arms Park	2026 Six Nations Women's U21 Series	
2 May 2026	Scotland U21			Stade Maurice Trélut	2026 Six Nations Women's U21 Series	
2 May 2026	England U21			Goldington Road	2026 Six Nations Women's U21 Series	

=== Friendly / one-off matches ===
==== Vs. U20/U21 teams ====
Date	Opponent	PF	PA	Venue	Refs
20 March 2010	England U20	36	22	—	
27 February 2011	England U20	5	12	—	
11 March 2012	England U20	50	0	—	
4 April 2012	England U20	11	5	Moulton College	
7 April 2012	England U20	13	3	Moulton College	
23 February 2013	England U20	17	5	Esher Rugby Club	
15 March 2013	England U20	15	3	—	
1 February 2014	England U20	27	0	—	
22 February 2014	England U20	28	0	Esher Rugby Club	
28 February 2015	England U20	25	0	—	
21 March 2015	England U20	10	5	Esher Rugby Club	
5 March 2016	England U20	25	25	Esher Rugby Club	
19 March 2016	England U20	24	12	—	
25 February 2017	England U20	17	7	Esher Rugby Club	
17 March 2017	England U20	27	12	—	
24 February 2018	England U20	20	27	—	
17 March 2018	England U20	17	10	Basingstoke	
9 March 2019	England U20	31	12	—	
16 March 2019	England U20	40	14	—	
22 March 2022	England U20	35	14	—	
2 April 2022	England U20	32	27	—	
8 April 2023	England U20	35	17	Wellington College	
15 April 2023	England U20	40	31	Stade de la Vallée du Cher	
20 April 2024	England U20	74	0	Stade Jean Mermoz, Rouen	

==== Vs. national first teams ====
Date	Opponent	PF	PA	Venue	Refs
7 February 2015	Belgium	46	0	Marcoussis	

==== Vs. other teams ====
Date	Opponent	PF	PA	Venue	Refs
6 February 2016	Basque Country	42	5	—	
4 February 2017	Basque Country	44	0	—	
