= List of England women's national under-21 rugby union team matches =

The following is a list of England women's national under-21 rugby union team matches. The team was formally known as known as the England women's national under-20 rugby union team.

== Match list ==
Won	Lost	Draw

=== Competitive matches ===
Date	Opponent	PF	PA	Venue	Competition	Refs
11 July 2008	Canada U20	31	5	Appleby College	2008 Women's U20 Nations Cup	
16 July 2008	Wales U20	14	3	Appleby College	2008 Women's U20 Nations Cup	
19 July 2008	Canada U20	30	7	Appleby College	2008 Women's U20 Nations Cup	
9 July 2009	Canada U20	47	0	Brunel University	2009 Women's U20 Nations Cup	
12 July 2009	United States U20	40	7	Brunel University	2009 Women's U20 Nations Cup	
15 July 2009	Wales U20	29	3	Brunel University	2009 Women's U20 Nations Cup	
18 July 2009	United States U20	110	0	Brunel University	2009 Women's U20 Nations Cup	
14 July 2011	Canada U20	41	0	Santa Barbara	2011 Women's U20 Nations Cup	
17 July 2011	United States U20	37	0	Santa Barbara	2011 Women's U20 Nations Cup	
20 July 2011	South Africa U20	66	7	Santa Barbara	2011 Women's U20 Nations Cup	
23 July 2011	United States U20	48	11	Santa Barbara	2011 Women's U20 Nations Cup	
11 July 2013	South Africa U20	22	24	Trent College	2013 Women's U20 Nations Cup	
14 July 2013	Canada U20	15	41	Trent College	2013 Women's U20 Nations Cup	
17 July 2013	United States U20	17	27	Trent College	2013 Women's U20 Nations Cup	
21 July 2013	South Africa U20	27	3	Trent College	2013 Women's U20 Nations Cup	
10 August 2018	Canada U20	36	22	Halifax	2018 U20 Women's Tri-Nations	
14 August 2018	United States U20	43	17	Halifax	2018 U20 Women's Tri-Nations	
18 August 2018	Canada U20	27	17	Halifax	2018 U20 Women's Tri-Nations	
20 July 2019	United States U20	62	0	Loughborough University	2019 U20 Women's Tri-Nations	
20 July 2019	Canada U20	24	15	Loughborough University	2019 U20 Women's Tri-Nations	
4 July 2024	Ireland U20	33	10	Stadio Sergio Lanfranchi	2024 Six Nations Women's U20 Summer Series	
9 July 2024	Wales U20	55	24	Stadio Sergio Lanfranchi	2024 Six Nations Women's U20 Summer Series	
14 July 2024	France U20	21	72	Stadio Sergio Lanfranchi	2024 Six Nations Women's U20 Summer Series	
5 July 2025	Scotland U20	31	17	Centre for Sporting Excellence	2025 Six Nations Women's U20 Summer Series	
11 July 2025	Italy U20	20	36	Centre for Sporting Excellence	2025 Six Nations Women's U20 Summer Series	
17 July 2025	France U20	39	52	Centre for Sporting Excellence	2025 Six Nations Women's U20 Summer Series	
18 April 2026	Scotland U21	51	12	Edinburgh Rugby Stadium	2026 Six Nations Women's U21 Series	
18 April 2026	Ireland U21			Butts Park Arena	2026 Six Nations Women's U21 Series	
18 April 2026	France U21			Goldington Road	2026 Six Nations Women's U21 Series	

=== Friendly / one-off matches ===
==== Vs. U20/U21 teams ====
Date	Opponent	PF	PA	Venue	Refs
3 February 2008	Wales U20	31	0	—	
26 March 2008	Wales U20	43	0	—	
16 April 2009	Wales U20	26	8	—	
20 March 2010	France U20	22	36	—	
20 April 2010	Wales U20	17	7	—	
9 June 2010	France U20	7	12	—	
27 February 2011	France U20	12	5	—	
12 March 2011	Scotland U20	77	0	—	
27 April 2011	Wales U20	32	19	—	
11 March 2012	France U20	0	50	—	
4 April 2012	France U20	5	11	Moulton College	
7 April 2012	France U20	3	13	Moulton College	
23 February 2013	France U20	5	17	Esher Rugby Club	
15 March 2013	France U20	3	15	—	
1 February 2014	France U20	0	27	—	
22 February 2014	France U20	0	28	Esher Rugby Club	
28 February 2015	France U20	0	25	—	
21 March 2015	France U20	5	10	Esher Rugby Club	
5 March 2016	France U20	25	25	Esher Rugby Club	
19 March 2016	France U20	12	24	—	
18 August 2016	Canada U20	46	8	Nottingham Trent College	
22 August 2016	Canada U20	39	12	Nottingham Trent College	
26 August 2016	Canada U20	34	12	Nottingham Trent College	
25 February 2017	France U20	7	17	Esher Rugby Club	
17 March 2017	France U20	12	27	—	
24 February 2018	France U20	27	20	—	
17 March 2018	France U20	10	17	Basingstoke	
9 March 2019	France U20	12	31	—	
16 March 2019	France U20	14	40	—	
25 March 2020	Scotland U20	66	19	Kingston Park	
19 March 2022	Scotland U20	38	7	—	
22 March 2022	France U20	14	35	—	
2 April 2022	France U20	27	32	—	
8 April 2023	France U20	17	35	Wellington College	
15 April 2023	France U20	31	40	Stade de la Vallée du Cher	
20 April 2024	France U20	0	74	Stade Jean Mermoz, Rouen	
4 May 2024	Wales U20	45	5	Shaftesbury Park, Bristol	
19 July 2024	Canada U20	33	36	Cardiff Arms Park	
24 July 2024	United States U20	22	40	Cardiff Arms Park	
25 March 2026	Canada U21	21	59	London	

==== Vs. national first teams ====
Date	Opponent	PF	PA	Venue	Refs
21 November 2021	South Africa	5	38	Hazelwood	
12 April 2025	South Africa	17	50	Marcoussis	

==== Vs. other teams ====
Date	Opponent	PF	PA	Venue	Refs
1 April 2005	British Police	26	17	—	
17 February 2015	British Army	25	10	—	
18 February 2016	British Army	41	12	Aldershot Army Stadium	
16 February 2017	British Army	38	15	—	
14 February 2018	British Army	44	0	—	
9 February 2019	British Army	33	5	—	
23 March 2024	British Army	99	5	Havant	
4 April 2026	Spain XV	27	17	Campo de Rugby El Pantano, Villajoyosa	
