= Killarney RFC historical results =

Below are details of all the competitive matches played by Killarney RFC since 2002. They are listed season by season and arranged according to competition. They are compiled using data available from the Munster Junior Rugby website and also the Official Club Website.

== 2002/03 Season ==
The 2002/03 season was a disappointing one for Killarney. The club lost all their league matches finishing bottom of the Munster Junior League Division 3. They also lost their Munster Junior Cup game against Bandon and declined to make the long trip to Clonakilty for the Munster Junior Plate.
Munster Junior League Division 3 Final Table 2002/03

Pos	Team	Pld	W	D	L	PF	PA	BP	Pts
1	Cashel	12	10	0	2	469	69	11	51
2	Charleville	12	11	0	1	386	64	7	51
3	Galbally	12	12	0	0	192	66	3	51
4	Abbeyfeale	12	8	0	4	223	134	6	38
5	Fermoy	12	7	0	5	189	177	4	32
6	Presentation	12	6	0	6	191	165	3	27
7	Newport	12	5	0	7	186	196	5	25
8	Newcastle West	12	5	0	7	122	211	4	24
9	Dunmanway	12	5	0	7	79	208	1	21
10	Dungarvan	12	3	1	8	181	219	6	20
11	Mallow	12	3	1	8	73	212	4	18
12	Kilrush	12	2	0	10	125	295	3	11
13	Killarney	12	0	0	12	99	499	2	2

Munster Junior League Division 3 Results 2002/03

Date	Venue	Home team	Score	Away team
6 Oct	Dirreen	Killarney	13–35	Galbally
13 Oct	Rathuard	Presentation	84–5	Killarney
27 Oct	Ballyrandle	Dungarvan	17–8	Killarney
3 Nov	Dirreen	Killarney	8–27	Fermoy
1 Dec	Dirreen	Killarney	10–12	Mallow
8 Dec	Dirreen	Killarney	0–3	Dunmanway
15 Dec	Dirreen	Killarney	19–34	Newport
12 Jan	Cullinagh	Newcastle West	27–19	Killarney
9 Feb	Monmore	Kilrush	46–0	Killarney
23 Feb	Dirreen	Killarney	0–77	Charleville
2 Mar	The Grove	Abbeyfeale	33–12	Killarney
6 Apr	Spafield	Cashel	104–5	Killarney

Munster Junior Cup Results 2002/03

Date	Venue	Round	Home team	Score	Away team
5 Jan	Dirreen	1	Killarney	3–53	Bandon

Munster Junior Plate Results 2002/03

Date	Venue	Round	Home team	Score	Away team
2 Feb	Shannonvale Cross	1	Clonakilty	W/O	Killarney

Munster Junior Clubs Challenge Cup Results 2002/03

Date	Venue	Round	Home team	Score	Away team
22 Sep	Dirreen	1	Killarney	Bye	N/A
29 Sep	Dirreen	2	Killarney	0–37	Charleville

== 2003/04 Season ==
The 2003/04 season was a much better season than the previous one for Killarney. They recorded 4 league wins and finished in 11th place in Division 3. They had a narrow victory over Presentation in the Munster Junior Clubs Challenge Cup, but were then no match for Old Christians in the next round.

Munster Junior League Division 3 Final Table 2003/04

Pos	Team	Pld	W	D	L	PF	PA	BP	Pts
1	Abbeyfeale	12	11	1	0	305	73	5	51
2	Fermoy	12	9	1	2	352	125	8	46
3	Mallow	12	9	0	3	243	82	9	45
4	Newcastle West	12	8	2	2	275	150	6	42
5	Galbally	11	6	0	5	184	125	6	30
6	Newport	12	6	0	6	163	184	3	27
7	Kinsale	12	6	0	6	214	228	3	27
8	Dunmanway	11	5	1	5	115	121	3	25
9	Presentation	12	4	0	8	222	209	8	24
10	Carrick-on-Suir	12	4	1	7	154	192	3	21
11	Killarney	12	4	0	8	98	229	2	18
12	Dungarvan	12	1	1	10	102	382	3	9
13	Kilrush	12	0	1	11	56	383	2	4

Match Galbally v. Dunmanway not played

Munster Junior League Division 3 Results 2003/04

Date	Venue	Home team	Score	Away team
5 Oct	Freigh Park	Newport	15–3	Killarney
12 Oct	Dirreen	Killarney	29–13	Carrick-on-Suir
26 Oct	Dirreen	Killarney	0–37	Abbeyfeale
2 Nov	Parkadillane	Mallow	29–0	Killarney
16 Nov	The Showgrounds	Fermoy	33–0	Killarney
7 Dec	Dirreen	Killarney	6–5	Dungarvan
14 Dec	Dirreen	Killarney	17–10	Presentation
18 Jan	Galbally	Galbally	24–0	Killarney
1 Feb	Milleenanannig	Dunmanway	13–5	Killarney
8 Feb	Dirreen	Killarney	7–29	Newcastle West
29 Feb	Snugmore	Kinsale	14–12	Killarney
13 Mar	Dirreen	Killarney	19–7	Kilrush

Munster Junior Cup Results 2003/04

Date	Venue	Round	Home team	Score	Away team
N/A	N/A	1	Killarney	Bye	N/A
25 Jan	Ballinakill	2	Waterpark	W/O	Killarney

Munster Junior Clubs Challenge Cup Results 2003/04

Date	Venue	Round	Home team	Score	Away team
21 Sep	Dirreen	1	Killarney	21–18	Presentation
28 Sep	Dirreen	2	Killarney	3–61	Old Christians

== 2004/05 Season ==
Despite the fact that Killarney won fewer games in the Munster Junior League this season than last they still finished two places higher up the table in 9th position. An impressive 19–9 away win in Kinsale was as good as it got as their only other victory was a narrow two-point win at home to Galbally. Their other 'win' was courtesy of a walkover from Dunmanway. They lost all four cup matches they played including a narrow defeat to neighbours Tralee in the Munster Junior Cup.

Munster Junior League Division 3 Final Table 2004/05

Pos	Team	Pld	W	D	L	PF	PA	BP	Pts
1	Douglas	11	10	0	1	308	105	7	47
2	Newport	11	9	0	2	199	82	5	41
3	Mallow	11	9	0	2	246	93	3	39
4	Presentation	11	9	0	2	185	83	2	38
5	Newcastle West	11	6	0	5	284	172	6	30
6	Ballincollig	11	6	0	5	175	105	5	29
7	Galbally	10	5	0	5	159	156	5	25
8	Carrick-on-Suir	10	3	0	7	117	184	4	16
9	Killarney	11	3	0	8	58	150	1	13
10	Kinsale	11	3	0	8	77	229	0	12
11	Dungarvan	11	1	0	10	61	328	4	8
12	Dunmanway	11	1	0	10	47	229	4	8

Match Galbally v. Carrick-on-Suir was not played

Munster Junior League Division 3 Results 2004/05

Date	Venue	Home team	Score	Away team
10 Oct	Snugmore	Kinsale	9–19	Killarney
7 Nov	Dirreen	Killarney	3–34	Newport
21 Nov	Cullinagh	Newcastle West	6–5	Killarney
12 Dec	Dirreen	Killarney	7–5	Galbally
19 Dec	Dirreen	Killarney	0–15	Mallow
9 Jan	Tybroughney	Carrick-on-Suir	13–3	Killarney
23 Jan	Dirreen	Killarney	14–22	Douglas
13 Feb	Rathuard	Presentation	11–0	Killarney
6 Mar	Dirreen	Killarney	0–20	Ballincollig
13 Mar	Ballyrandle	Dungarvan	15–7	Killarney
27 Mar	Dirreen	Killarney	W-	Dunmanway

Munster Junior Cup Results 2004/05

Date	Venue	Round	Home team	Score	Away team
16 Jan	Dirreen	1	Killarney	6–9	Tralee

Munster Junior Plate Results 2004/05

Date	Venue	Round	Home team	Score	Away team
30 Jan	Ballyanly	1	Muskerry	16–0	Killarney

Munster Junior Clubs Challenge Cup Results 2004/05

Date	Venue	Round	Home team	Score	Away team
19 Sep	Parkadillane	1	Mallow	44–10	Killarney

Martin O'Sullivan Cup Results 2004/05

Date	Venue	Round	Home team	Score	Away team
10 Apr	Freigh Park	1	Newport	10–0	Killarney

== 2005/06 Season ==
Killarney only lost 4 of their 8 league matches in 2005/06, but only winning 2 games meant they finished down in 8th place. The cup competitions were a massive disappointment. A 61–0 drubbing away to Bandon was followed by a 44–0 home defeat to Clonmel. The club didn't travel to Tanner Park to play Ballincollig in the Martin O'Sullivan Cup having already lost there to them in the league 46–0.

Munster Junior League Division 3 Final Table 2005/06

Pos	Team	Pld	W	D	L	PF	PA	BP	Pts
1	Mallow	9	8	1	0	214	46	4	38
2	Ballincollig	9	8	1	0	204	39	4	38
3	Waterford City	9	5	1	3	116	108	2	24
4	Galbally	9	5	0	4	134	113	4	24
5	Carrick-on-Suir	9	3	2	4	98	139	3	19
6	Newcastle West	9	2	0	7	174	153	10	18
7	Kinsale	8	3	0	5	111	127	3	15
8	Killarney	8	2	2	4	65	192	0	12
9	Presentation	9	2	0	7	95	164	3	11
10	Dungarvan	9	2	1	6	70	200	0	10

Munster Junior League Division 3 Results 2005/06

Date	Venue	Home team	Score	Away team
9 Oct	Dirreen	Killarney	16–16	Carrick-on-Suir
16 Oct	Dirreen	Killarney	10–37	Newcastle West
30 Oct	Galbally	Galbally	14–5	Killarney
27 Nov	Parkadillane	Mallow	59–0	Killarney
4 Dec	Dirreen	Killarney	10–8	Presentation
11 Dec	Tanner Park	Ballincollig	46–0	Killarney
8 Jan	Dirreen	Killarney	17–5	Dungarvan
22 Jan	Dirreen	Killarney	7–7	Waterford City

Match Kinsale v. Killarney was not played

Munster Junior Cup Results 2005/06

Date	Venue	Round	Home team	Score	Away team
12 Feb	Old Chapel	1	Bandon	61–0	Killarney

Munster Junior Plate Results 2005/06

Date	Venue	Round	Home team	Score	Away team
19 Mar	Dirreen	1	Killarney	0–44	Clonmel

Munster Junior Clubs Challenge Cup Results 2005/06

Date	Venue	Round	Home team	Score	Away team
29 Sep	Galbally	1	Galbally	19–8	Killarney

Martin O'Sullivan Cup Results 2005/06

Date	Venue	Round	Home team	Score	Away team
N/A	N/A	1	Killarney	Bye	N/A
9 Apr	Tanner Park	Qtr-Fnls	Ballincollig	W/O	Killarney

McElligott Cup Final Table 2005/06

Pos	Team	Pld	W	D	L	PF	PA	BP	Pts
1	Tralee	3	3	0	0	96	12	3	15
2	Castleisland	3	2	0	1	48	25	1	9
3	Killarney	2	0	0	2	10	52	1	1
4	Abbeyfeale	2	0	0	2	0	65	0	0

McElligott Cup Results 2005/06

Date	Venue	Home team	Score	Away team
4 Sep	Crageens	Castleisland	9–3	Killarney
11 Sep	Dirreen	Killarney	7–43	Tralee

Match Killarney v. Abbeyfeale not played

Galwey Foley Cup 2005/06

Date	Venue	Round	Home team	Score	Away team
4 Sep	O'Dowd Park	1	Tralee	W/O	Killarney

== 2006/07 Season ==
The 2006/07 season was a very disappointing one for Killarney. Winning only 2 league matches meant they finished down in 8th place. Both wins were away from home against the bottom 2, Dungarvan and Presentation. After losing away to Charleville in the Munster Junior Cup they declined to enter the Munster Junior Plate, giving Waterford City a walkover. Killarney were a little unfortunate in the Martin O'Sullivan Cup, drawing 17 all with Fermoy they lost out on try count.

Munster Junior League Division 3 Final Table 2006/07

Pos	Team	Pld	W	D	L	PF	PA	BP	Pts
1	Newcastle West	9	8	1	0	154	60	2	36
2	Fermoy	9	7	0	2	176	52	5	33
3	Kinsale	9	7	0	2	156	75	3	31
4	Galbally	8	5	0	3	110	71	3	23
5	Carrick-on-Suir	9	4	1	4	106	97	3	21
6	Charleville	8	4	0	4	93	58	3	19
7	Waterford City	8	4	0	4	75	99	2	19
8	Killarney	9	2	0	7	56	131	2	10
9	Presentation	8	1	0	7	45	168	2	6
10	Dungarvan	9	0	0	9	76	236	2	2

Matches Presentation v. Charleville and Waterford City v. Galbally not played

Munster Junior League Division 3 Results 2006/07

Date	Venue	Home team	Score	Away team
8 Oct	Dirreen	Killarney	0–25	Charleville
15 Oct	Ballyrandle	Dungarvan	5–10	Killarney
22 Oct	Dirreen	Killarney	0–12	Fermoy
5 Oct	Rathuard	Presentation	8–13	Killarney
12 Nov	Dirreen	Killarney	22–23	Kinsale
19 Nov	Kilbarry	Waterford City	8–3	Killarney
10 Dec	Cullinagh	Newcastle West	15–0	Killarney
7 Jan	Dirreen	Killarney	3–16	Galbally
21 Jan	Tybroughney	Carrick-on-Suir	19–5	Killarney

Munster Junior Cup Results 2006/07

Date	Venue	Round	Home team	Score	Away team
28 Jan	Shandrum	1	Charleville	24–3	Killarney

Munster Junior Plate Results 2006/07

Date	Venue	Round	Home team	Score	Away team
N/A	N/A	1	Killarney	Bye	N/A
18 Mar	Kilbarry	2	Waterford City	W/O	Killarney

Munster Junior Clubs Challenge Cup Results 2006/07

Date	Venue	Round	Home team	Score	Away team
3 Sep	Shandrum	1	Charleville	W/O	Killarney

Martin O'Sullivan Cup Results 2006/07

Date	Venue	Round	Home team	Score	Away team
25 Mar	Dirreen	1	Killarney	17–17	Fermoy

Fermoy win on try count

== 2007/08 Season ==
A mid-table finish for Killarney in 2007/08 was a marked improvement on the previous season's league campaign with the highlight being a 22–5 victory over Carrick-on-Suir at Christmas. Indeed, the Tipperary side declined to travel to Dirreen again when the sides were drawn to play each other in the Munster Junior Plate. That walkover did no favours for Killarney as they were no match for Senior side Sunday's Well in the next round. Killarney had a good 24–0 win over Waterford City in the Munster Junior Clubs Challenge Cup, but suffered a heavy defeat to Kinsale in the next round. The club's final game of the season was a disappointing trip to East Clare to play Scariff in the Martin O'Sullivan Cup.

Munster Junior League Division 3 Final Table 2007/08

Pos	Team	Pld	W	D	L	PF	PA	BP	Pts
1	Kinsale	10	10	0	0	212	22	4	44
2	Charleville	10	8	0	2	203	30	5	37
3	Carrick-on-Suir	10	6	1	3	187	105	5	31
4	Castleisland	10	7	0	3	139	94	2	30
5	St. Mary's	10	6	0	4	143	136	1	25
6	Waterford City	10	5	1	4	124	152	2	24
7	Killarney	9	3	1	5	75	91	4	18
8	Killorglin	10	3	0	7	112	157	2	14
9	Presentation	10	2	0	8	80	135	3	11
10	Galbally	9	1	1	7	74	175	3	9
11	Dungarvan	10	1	0	9	33	286	0	4

Munster Junior League Division 3 Results 2007/08

Date	Venue	Home team	Score	Away team
7 Oct	Dirreen	Killarney	7–15	St. Mary's
14 Oct	Snugmore	Kinsale	11–5	Killarney
21 Oct	Dirreen	Killarney	8–5	Presentation
4 Nov	Langford St.	Killorglin	12–10	Killarney
11 Nov	Dirreen	Killarney	0–19	Charleville
16 Dec	Ballyrandle	Dungarvan	3–5	Killarney
23 Dec	Dirreen	Killarney	22–5	Carrick-on-Suir
17 Feb	Dirreen	Killarney	15–15	Waterford City
2 Mar	Crageens	Castleisland	6–3	Killarney

Match Galbally v. Killarney was not played

Munster Junior Cup Results 2007/08

Date	Venue	Round	Home team	Score	Away team
10 Feb	Knocknacolan	1	Kanturk	33–7	Killarney

Munster Junior Plate Results 2007/08

Date	Venue	Round	Home team	Score	Away team
24 Feb	Dirreen	1	Killarney	W/O	Carrick-on-Suir
16 Mar	Dirreen	2	Killarney	0–23	Sunday's Well

Munster Junior Clubs Challenge Cup Results 2007/08

Date	Venue	Round	Home team	Score	Away team
9 Sep	N/A	1	Killarney	Bye	N/A
16 Sep	Dirreen	2	Killarney	24–0	Waterford City
23 Sep	Snugmore	3	Kinsale	69–0	Killarney

Martin O'Sullivan Cup Results 2007/08

Date	Venue	Round	Home team	Score	Away team
23 Mar	Craven Park	1	Scariff	15–7	Killarney

== 2008/09 Season ==
The 2008/09 season was a very successful season for Killarney, with the club almost clinching a league play-off place, reaching the semi-finals of the Martin O'Sullivan Cup and beating Shannon in the Munster Junior Plate. Division 3 of the Munster Junior League was divided into two sections for the 2008/09 season with the top two teams in each section going into a play-off to gain promotion. Having begun the league campaign with four straight defeats, it looked like being a disastrous season for Killarney, however with the appointment of Bill Stack as coach, fortunes changed immediately and the club won seven league matches in a row. With one game to go Killarney were on the verge of securing a top two spot. Their final match was away to rivals Castleisland who had already secured top spot. Killarney needed a win and were leading 18–14 when the game went into injury time. Then Castleisland scored a breakaway try to lead by a point. Killarney did have a chance to win the match but a long range penalty with the last kick of the game was missed.

The highlight of the season was almost certainly the 13–12 victory over Shannon in the Munster Junior Plate. This match was won by a late Seán Hickey penalty which sparked scenes of great celebrations on the touchline. The club also had a great run in the Martin O'Sullivan Cup where they reached the semi-finals, however the long trip to Kilbarry wasn't fruitful and they lost 22–6 to Waterford City.

Off the field plans were under way to secure a permanent home for the club instead of their rented home and several sites were being looked at as possibilities with the hope that one would be secured by the end of 2009.

Munster Junior League Division 3A Final Table 2008/09

Pos	Team	Pld	W	D	L	PF	PA	BP	Pts
1	Castleisland	12	11	0	1	268	65	5	49
2	St. Mary's	11	7	1	3	153	106	3	33
3	Killarney	12	7	0	5	139	101	3	31
4	Presentation	12	7	0	5	156	112	3	31
5	Kilrush	12	5	1	6	133	133	4	26
6	Killorglin	11	3	0	8	163	195	3	15
7	Scariff*	12	0	0	12	61	361	1	-3

*Scariff deducted 4 points for giving a walkover.
Match Killorglin v. St. Mary's not played.

Play-off semi-finals
Castleisland 3–6 Galbally
Carrick-on-Suir 14–18 St. Mary's
Galbally and St. Mary's promoted to Division 2

Division 3 Final
Galbally 43–3 St. Mary's

Munster Junior League Division 3A Results 2008/09

Date	Venue	Home team	Score	Away team
20 Sep	Corbally	St. Mary's	18–10	Killarney
26 Oct	Dirreen	Killarney	0–15	Kilrush
2 Nov	Rathuard	Presentation	5–0	Killarney
16 Nov	Dirreen	Killarney	3–13	Castleisland
23 Nov	Langford St.	Killorglin	6–17	Killarney
30 Nov	Dirreen	Killarney	W/O	Scariff
14 Dec	Dirreen	Killarney	19–13	St. Mary's
1 Feb	Monmore	Kilrush	6–13	Killarney
22 Feb	Dirreen	Killarney	10–3	Presentation
22 Mar	Dirreen	Killarney	22–9	Killorglin
29 Mar	Craven Park	Scariff	5–44	Killarney
8 Apr	Crageens	Castleisland	19–18	Killarney

Munster Junior Cup Results 2008/09

Date	Venue	Round	Home team	Score	Away team
7 Dec	Dirreen	1	Killarney	14–23	Clonakilty

Munster Junior Plate Results 2008/09

Date	Venue	Round	Home team	Score	Away team
21 Dec	Dirreen	1	Killarney	W/O	Dungarvan
8 Feb	Dirreen	2	Killarney	34–18	Killorglin
1 Mar	Dirreen	3	Killarney	13–12	Shannon
15 Mar	Loughtagalla	4	Thurles	17–0	Killarney

Martin O'Sullivan Cup Results 2008/09

Date	Venue	Round	Home team	Score	Away team
5 Apr	Dirreen	1	Killarney	22–6	Kilrush
19 Apr	Dirreen	Quarter-finals	Killarney	W/O	Douglas
26 Apr	Kilbarry	Semi-finals	Waterford City	22–6	Killarney

== 2009/10 Season ==
The 2009/10 season will long be remembered by players and supporters of Killarney. The club was able to field a 2nd XV for the first time to compete in the Munster J2 League, a location for the club's permanent home was secured (subject to Council planning permission), 4 members of the Under 17 squad were selected on the Munster Under 17 panel (and 1 more on the reserves) but more importantly the club gained promotion to Division 2 of the Munster Junior League. The club's aim to improve on last season's performance by winning promotion almost came asunder as the season drew to a close when they surprisingly lost to neighbours Killorglin. Then followed a must win game away to Abbeyfeale where the team put in one of the performances of the season to overturn a half-time deficit to win 19–6. A comfortable bonus-point win at home to Corca Dhuibhne secured the play-off place.

The play-off away to Charleville was an enthralling and nerve-racking tie. A tough match with little or nothing between the sides looked like slipping away from Killarney despite two excellent tries from Gene McCarthy and Brian O'Sullivan, when they conceded a late penalty which was converted to leave Charleville 20–18 in front. Then with the final play of the match Killarney's forwards advanced towards the goal line and when a penalty was conceded by the home side, Seán Hickey converted with the last kick of the game to spark wild celebrations. A week later another tough encounter with perennial rivals Castleisland in the Division 3 Final resulted in a 9–3 defeat but it was only a slight blemish on a great season on the field. The club went on an end of season tour to Acqui Terme in northern Italy to participate in the Guido Erodio Memorial Tournament and ended up winning the competition. Off the field however Kerry County Council's decision to refuse the Club planning permission in March was a major disappointment.

=== 1ST XV ===
Munster Junior League Division 3A Final Table

Pos	Team	Pld	W	D	L	PF	PA	BP	Pts
1	Castleisland	13	11	1	1	379	105	8	54
2	Killarney	14	9	1	4	242	120	6	44
3	Abbeyfeale	14	8	2	4	233	159	6	42
4	Presentation	14	7	2	5	249	158	4	36
5	Corca Dhuibhne	13	5	0	8	160	234	5	25
6	Killorglin	13	5	0	8	187	278	3	23
7	Kilrush	13	3	1	9	86	243	2	16
8	Scariff	14	2	1	11	114	353	2	12

Matches Corca Dhuibhne v. Castleisland and Killorglin v. Kilrush not played

Division 3 Play-off semi-finals
Castleisland 16–13 Mallow (after extra-time)
Charleville 20–21 Killarney
Castleisland and Killarney promoted to Division 2

Division 3 Final
Castleisland 9–3 Killarney

Munster Junior League Division 3A Results

Date	Venue	Home team	Score	Away team	Half-time	Scorers for Killarney
11 Oct	Baile Loisce	Corca Dhuibhne	19–13	Killarney	9–13	Mike Nash (try); Seán Hickey (2 pens, conv)
18 Oct	Dirreen	Killarney	18–5	Abbeyfeale	8–0	Paul O'Sullivan (try); Alan Mulligan (try); Seán Hickey (conv, 2pens)
8 Nov	Dirreen	Killarney	29–0	Scariff	5–0	Ger Moynihan (try); Timmy Dudley (try); Brian O'Leary (try); Paul O'Sullivan (try); Ollie O'Neill (try); Seán Hickey (2 convs)
15 Nov	Monmore	Kilrush	0–12	Killarney	0–6	Seán Hickey (4 pens)
6 Dec	Dirreen	Killarney	32–5	Killorglin	12–0	Brian O'Sullivan (2 tries); Paul O'Sullivan (2 tries); Mike Nash (try); Seán Hickey (2 convs, pen)
20 Dec	Dirreen	Killarney	6–19	Castleisland	3–9	Seán Hickey (2 pens)
24 Jan	Dirreen	Killarney	23–3	Kilrush	18–3	Brian O'Sullivan (2 tries); Alan Mulligan (try); Seán Hickey (2 pens, conv)
7 Feb	Lees Rd., Ennis	Scariff	10–17	Killarney	5–17	Ger Moynihan (try); Brian O'Sullivan (try); Brian O'Leary (try); Mike Nash (conv)
21 Feb	Crageens	Castleisland	15–15	Killarney	9–12	Seán Hickey (5 pens)
28 Feb	Rathuard	Presentation	11–8	Killarney	8–5	Brian O'Leary (try); Ciarán O'Grady (pen)
7 Mar	Dirreen	Killarney	15–6	Presentation	8–0	Brian O'Sullivan (try); George Linehan (try); Seán Hickey (pen, conv)
21 Mar	Langford St.	Killorglin	16–11	Killarney	8–3	Paul O'Sullivan (try); Seán Hickey (2 pens)
28 Mar	The Grove	Abbeyfeale	6–19	Killarney	6–3	John O'Sullivan (try); Seán Hickey (3 pens, drop goal, conv)
4 Apr	Dirreen	Killarney	24–5	Corca Dhuibhne	12–5	Alan Mulligan (try); Brian O'Sullivan (try); Adrian Hegarty (try); Paudie Sheahan (try); Seán Hickey (2 convs)

Munster Junior League Division 3 Play-offs

Date	Round	Venue	Home team	Score	Away team	Half-time	Scorers for Killarney
11 Apr	semi-final	Shandrum	Charleville	20–21	Killarney	11–6	Gene McCarthy (try); Brian O'Sullivan (try); Seán Hickey (3 pens, conv)
18 Apr	Final	The Grove	Castleisland	9–3	Killarney	0–0	Seán Hickey (pen)

Munster Junior Cup Results

Date	Venue	Round	Home team	Score	Away team	Half-time	Scorers for Killarney
17 Jan	Moneygourney	1	Douglas	6–16	Killarney	3–7	Alan Mulligan (try); Seán Hickey (2 pens, conv); Paul O'Sullivan (drop goal)
31 Jan	Kilbarry	2	Waterford City	17–5	Killarney	5–5	John O'Sullivan (try)

Munster Junior Plate Results

Date	Venue	Round	Home team	Score	Away team	Half-time	Scorers for Killarney
N/A	N/A	1	Killarney	Bye	N/A	N/A	N/A
14 Feb	Dirreen	2	Killarney	W/O	St. Mary's	N/A	N/A
14 Mar	Loughtagalla	3	Thurles	W/O	Killarney	N/A	N/A

Martin O'Sullivan Cup Results

Date	Venue	Round	Home team	Score	Away team	Half-time	Scorers for Killarney
19 Sep	Crageens*	1	Killarney	0–6	Castleisland	0–6	N/A

*Match was played at Crageens because Killarney's ground was unavailable

=== 2ND XV ===
Munster Junior Two League (South) Section A Final Table

Pos	Team	Pld	W	D	L	PF	PA	BP	Pts
1	Tralee	8	6	0	2	192	61	7	31
2	Listowel	8	6	0	2	82	80	0	24
3	Castleisland	8	4	0	4	74	97	2	18
4	Kanturk	7	3	0	4	101	115	1	13
5	Killarney	7	0	0	7	42	138	1	1

Munster Junior Two League (South) Section A Results

Date	Venue	Home team	Score	Away team
4 Oct	Crageens	Castleisland	22–9	Killarney
11 Oct	O'Dowd Park*	Killarney	10–35	Tralee
18 Oct	Knocknacolan	Kanturk	18–6	Killarney
1 Nov	Direen	Killarney	6–15	Listowel
29 Nov	Dirreen*	Tralee	29–5	Killarney
17 Jan	Tralee Road	Listowel	6–3	Killarney
24 Jan	Dirreen	Killarney	3–13	Castleisland

Note: The match Killarney v. Kanturk was cancelled

- This fixture was reversed because Killarney's ground was unavailable for the initial home fixture

George O’Connell Cup Group A Final Table

Pos	Team	Pld	W	D	L	PF	PA	BP	Pts
1	Bantry Bay	4	4	0	0	131	38	2	18
2	Kinsale	4	2	0	2	96	63	3	11
3	Crosshaven	4	2	0	2	62	64	1	9
4	Sunday's Well	4	2	0	2	62	85	1	9
5	Killarney	4	0	0	4	14	93	0	0

George O'Connell Cup Group A Results

Date	Venue	Home team	Score	Away team
7 Feb	Dirreen	Killarney	0–22	Sunday's Well
14 Feb	Snugmore	Kinsale	29–3	Killarney
20 Feb	Dirreen	Killarney	11–22	Crosshaven
28 Feb	Beach	Bantry Bay	20–0	Killarney

Munster South Junior Two Cup Results

Date	Venue	Round	Home team	Score	Away team
21 Mar	Knocknacolan	1	Kanturk	W/O	Killarney

== 2010/11 Season ==
Following from the success of the previous season it was hard to imagine that the 2010/11 season would be even more successful. Continuing on their fine league form from their promotion a very creditable top half finish in Division 2 was almost seen as a little disappointing given that some results should have been better and a top 4 finish could have been achieved. However the crowning moment of the season was unquestionably the victory over Newport in the Final of the Munster Junior Plate at Musgrave Park. That 10–3 win culminated a run of 7 straight wins in all competitions and marked the club's first major provincial title. A tough final which saw long time servant Adrian Hegarty get the game's only try followed earlier victories against Dungarvan, Kanturk and Castleisland, all played away from home.

There was also a vast improvement in the fortunes of the 2nd XV who narrowly missed out on a League play-off spot. Their success was instrumental in maintaining the high standards achieved by the 1st XV. And with ever-increasing numbers at senior level the future looks bright for the club.

Elsewhere the young talent of the club came to the fore at international level with hooker Cillian Walsh making his Irish debut for the Ireland youths and received an Honorary Life Membership from the Club. Also the Club finally secured a site for its new home at Aghadoe, Killarney with work expected to commence by the year's end.

=== 1ST XV ===
Munster Junior League Division 2 Final Table

Pos	Team	Pld	W	D	L	PF	PA	BP	Pts
1	Galbally	12	12	0	0	278	120	3	51
2	Kanturk	13	11	1	1	269	118	2	48
3	Newcastle West	12	8	0	4	247	148	8	40
4	Mallow	13	8	0	5	217	210	4	36
5	St. Mary's	13	7	0	6	208	201	6	34
6	Youghal	13	6	0	7	278	267	8	32
7	Killarney	12	7	0	5	161	160	3	31
8	Castleisland	13	7	0	6	204	205	3	31
9	Ennis	12	4	1	7	166	171	6	24
10	Bandon	13	5	1	7	147	204	1	23
11	Newport	13	4	0	9	161	259	6	22
12	Kinsale	13	3	0	10	212	309	7	19
13	Muskerry	13	2	1	10	140	191	7	17
14	Charleville	13	2	2	9	121	246	3	15

Matches Ennis v. Killarney & Newcastle West v. Galbally not played

Munster Junior League Division 2 Results

Date	Venue	Home team	Score	Away team	Half-time	Scorers for Killarney
10 Oct	Shandrum	Charleville	3–24	Killarney	0–3	Ger Moynihan (try); Pádraig Hallissey (try); Brian O'Leary (try); Paudie Sheahan (pen, 3 convs)
17 Oct	Dirreen	Killarney	16–14	Kinsale	3–8	Brian O'Sullivan (try); Paudie Sheahan (3 pens, conv)
24 Oct	St. Enda's C.C.	St. Mary's	9–13	Killarney	3–3	Brian O'Leary (try); Paudie Sheahan (2 pens, conv)
7 Nov	Dirreen	Killarney	8–20	Galbally	3–10	John O'Sullivan (try); Paudie Sheahan (pen)
14 Nov	Dirreen	Killarney	5–0	Newport	5–0	Brian O'Sullivan (try)
28 Nov	Crageens	Castleisland	9–6	Killarney	6–3	Paudie Sheahan (2 pens)
2 Jan	Dirreen	Killarney	13–19	Newcastle West	13–8	Penalty try; Paudie Sheahan (2 pens, conv)
23 Jan	Frogmore	Youghal	36–5	Killarney	10–0	Paudie Sheahan (try)
6 Feb	Dirreen	Killarney	8–14	Kanturk	5–5	Brian O'Sullivan (try); Paudie Sheahan (pen)
6 Mar	Parkadillane	Mallow	12–24	Killarney	0–10	Timmy Dudley (try); Brian O'Leary (try); Alan Mulligan (try); Paudie Sheahan (pen, 3 convs)
20 Mar	Dirreen	Killarney	17–12	Muskerry	3–7	Paul O'Sullivan (try); Paudie Sheahan (4 pens)
27 Mar	Dirreen	Killarney	22–12	Bandon	12–12	Alan Mulligan (try); Colin McCarthy (try); Adrian Hegarty (try); Paudie Sheahan (2 convs, pen)
N/A	Drumbeggle	Ennis	–	Killarney	–	Match not played

Munster Junior Cup 2011 Results

Date	Venue	Round	Home team	Score	Away team	Half-time	Scorers for Killarney
N/A	N/A	1	Killarney	bye	N/A	N/A	N/A
30 Jan	Towns Park	2	Midleton	28–15	Killarney	14–3	Brian O'Sullivan (try); Pádraig Hallissey (try); Paudie Sheahan (pen, conv)

Munster Junior Plate 2011 Results

First Round
Kanturk	17
Mallow	11
Dungarvan	11
Killarney	27
Bandon	8
Muskerry	0
Sunday's Well	52
Douglas	3

Quarter-finals
Nenagh Ormond	17
Castleisland	18
Kanturk	24
Killarney	25
Newport	w/o
Abbeyfeale	--
Bandon	15
Sunday's Well	8

Semi-finals
Castleisland	0
Killarney	6
Newport	20
Bandon	6

Final
Killarney	10
Newport	3

Date	Venue	Round	Home team	Score	Away team	Half-time	Scorers for Killarney
20 Feb	Ballyrandle	1	Dungarvan	11–27	Killarney	5–12	Mike Nash (try); Kevin O'Leary (try); Paul O'Sullivan (try); Pádraig Hallissey (try); Paudie Sheahan (2 convs, pen)
13 Mar	Knocknacolan	Qtr-Final	Kanturk	24–25	Killarney	17–5	Brian O'Sullivan (try); Pádraig Hallissey (2 tries); Paudie Sheahan (2 pens, 2 convs)
3 Apr	Crageens	semi-final	Castleisland	0–6	Killarney	0–3	Paudie Sheahan (2 pens)
10 Apr	Musgrave Park	Final	Killarney	10–3	Newport	10–0	Adrian Hegarty (try); Paudie Sheahan (pen, conv)

Munster Junior Clubs Shield 2010 Results

Date	Venue	Round	Home team	Score	Away team	Half-time	Scorers for Killarney
12 Sep	Dirreen	1	Killarney	40–7	Muskerry	19–0	Penalty try; Paul O'Sullivan (2 tries); Adrian Hegarty (try); Paddy Crowe (2 tries); Paudie Sheahan (5 convs)
19 Sep	Galbally	Qtr-Final	Galbally	26–7	Killarney	3–0	Paul O'Sullivan (try); Paudie Sheahan (conv)

Starting XV v. Newport (Munster Junior Plate Final 10/4/2011)

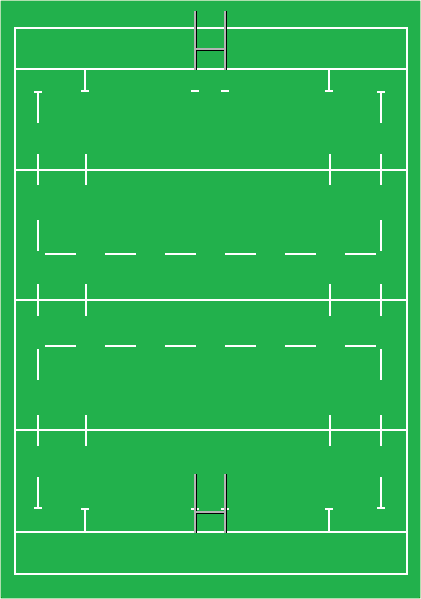

=== 2ND XV ===
Munster Junior Two League (South) Section A Final Table

Pos	Team	Pld	W	D	L	PF	PA	BP	Pts
1	Tralee	10	9	0	1	374	65	8	44
2	Listowel	10	5	1	4	148	113	4	26
3	Kenmare	10	6	0	4	127	210	0	24
4	Castleisland	10	5	0	5	124	164	3	23
5	Killarney	10	4	1	5	146	162	5	23
6	Iveragh Eagles	10	0	0	10	80	287	1	1

Tralee qualify for Phase 2 of Munster Junior Two League
Listowel & Kenmare advance to Mick Barry Cup
Castleisland, Killarney & Iveragh Eagles advance to George O'Connell Cup

Munster Junior Two League (South) Section A Results

Date	Venue	Home team	Score	Away team	Half-time	Scorers for Killarney
3 Oct	Dirreen	Killarney	28–11	Iveragh Eagles	13–6	Mike Lucey (try); Darren Enright (try); Kevin O'Leary (try); Cha Johnston (try); Ciaran O'Grady (2 pens, 1conv)
10 Oct	O'Dowd Park	Tralee	55–17	Killarney	26–3	? (try); ? (try); Ciaran O'Grady (pen, 2 convs)
17 Oct	Dromevane	Kenmare	3–22	Killarney	0–8	Paul Moynihan (2 tries); Keith O'Leary (try); Ciaran O'Grady (pen, 2 convs)
31 Oct	Dirreen	Killarney	3–6	Castleisland	3–3	Ciaran O'Grady (pen)
7 Nov	Tralee Rd.	Listowel	11–11	Killarney	5–3	Barry O'Brien (try); Seán Hickey (2 pens)
14 Nov	Cahersiveen	Iveragh Eagles	6–10	Killarney	6–10	Keith O'Leary (try); Cian Kingston (pen, conv)
20 Nov	Dirreen	Killarney	15–19	Tralee	3–12	Pat Fuller (try); Dan Coffey (try); Seán Hickey (pen, conv)
28 Nov	Dirreen	Killarney	15–20	Kenmare	15–3	Robin Bruton (2 tries); Cian Kingston (pen, conv)
2 Jan	Crageens	Castleisland	16–3	Killarney	?	Ciaran O'Grady (pen)
9 Jan	Dirreen	Killarney	22–15	Listowel	5–8	Cha Johnston (try); Damien O'Carroll (2 tries); Pádraig Hallissey (try); Ciaran O'Grady (conv)

George O'Connell Cup Group B Final Table

Pos	Team	Pld	W	D	L	PF	PA	BP	Pts
1	Dunmanway	3	3	0	0	56	5	2	14
2	Killarney	2	1	0	1	16	30	0	4
3	Iveragh Eagles	3	0	1	2	13	26	0	2
4	Castleisland	2	0	1	1	15	39	0	2

Match Killarney v. Castleisland not played

George O'Connell Cup Group B Results

Date	Venue	Home team	Score	Away team	Half-time	Scorers for Killarney
30 Jan	Milleenannig	Dunmanway	27–0	Killarney	14–0	---
20 Feb	Dirreen	Killarney	16–3	Iveragh Eagles	?	Gene McCarthy (try); Cian Kingston (3 pens, conv)
N/A	Dirreen	Killarney	–	Castleisland	–	Match not played

Munster Junior Two Cup 2011 Results

Date	Venue	Round	Home team	Score	Away team	Half-time	Scorers for Killarney
5 Mar	Dirreen	1	Killarney	19–44	Clonakilty	9–27	Eamonn Maguire (try); Donal O'Donovan (try); Cian Kingston (3 pens)

Dave Dineen Cup 2011

Date	Venue	Round	Home team	Score	Away team	Half-time	Scorers for Killarney
N/A	N/A	1	Killarney	Bye	–	–	–
10 Apr	Woodleigh Park	Qtr-Final	Highfield	W/O	Killarney	–	–

Galwey-Foley Cup 2011

Date	Venue	Round	Home team	Score	Away team	Half-time	Scorers for Killarney
27 Mar	Dirreen*	1	Iveragh Eagles	12–15	Killarney	7–8	Donal O'Donovan (try); Chris Brosnan (try); Ciaran O'Grady (pen, conv)
16 Apr	Dirreen	semi-final	Killarney	10–26	Tralee	3–14	John O'Donovan (try); Cian Kingston (pen, conv)

*Match played at Dirreen because Iveragh Eagles' pitch was unplayable

Paul Twomey Cup 2011

Date	Venue	Round	Home team	Score	Away team	Half-time	Scorers for Killarney
17 Apr	Musgrave Park	1	Sunday's Well	W/O	Killarney	–	–

== 2011/12 ==
=== Squad 2011/12 ===
- Props

Adrian Hegarty
Peter Kelly
Thomas Marshal
Ger Moynihan
Paul Moynihan
Eamon O'Callaghan
Kevin O'Leary
Ollie O'Neill
Danny O'Sullivan

- Hookers

Keith O'Leary
John O'Sullivan

- Second Rows

Chris Brosnan
T.J. Brosnan
Mike Fleming
John McGrath
Alan Mulligan
Diarmuid O'Donoghue
Brian O'Regan

- Back Rows

Darren Enright
Rob Fox
Pádraig Hallissey
David Hickey
Cha Johnston
Mike Lucey
Donal O'Donovan
Connie O'Leary
Brian O'Sullivan
Garry Tangney

- Scrumhalfs

Denis Kissane
Conor O'Leary
Paul O'Sullivan

- Outhalfs

Seán Hickey
Pádraig Sheahan
Kevin Keane

- Centres

Eoin Deasy
John Friel
George Lenihan
TJ Linnane
Colin McCarthy
Shane McSweeney
Eamonn Maguire
John O'Donovan
Brian O'Leary

- Wingers

Mike Henderson
Mike Lynch
Gene McCarthy
Mike Nash
John O'Keefe
Kareem Qasim
David Treacy

- Fullbacks

Cian Kingston
Ciaran O'Grady

=== 1st XV ===
Starting XV v. Kinsale (25/03/2012)

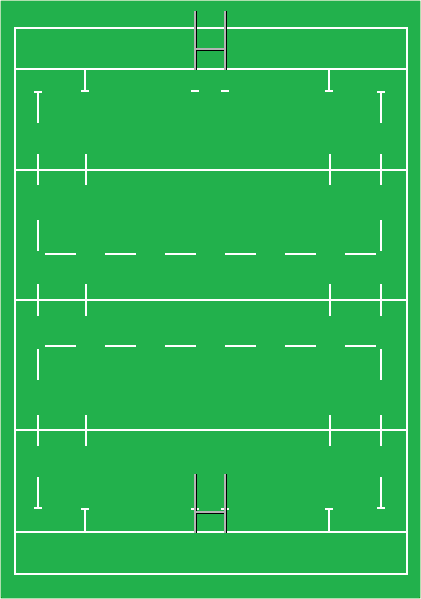

Munster Junior League Division 2 Final Table

Pos	Team	Pld	W	D	L	PF	PA	BP	Pts
1	St. Mary's	13	11	0	2	288	134	7	51
2	Newcastle West	13	12	0	1	257	152	2	50
3	Mallow	13	11	0	2	275	127	6	50
4	Kinsale	13	8	1	4	256	176	6	40
5	Killarney	13	7	0	6	219	172	7	35
6	Presentation	13	7	0	6	178	155	2	30
7	Youghal	13	5	1	7	193	231	6	28
8	Castleisland	13	5	0	8	144	195	5	25
9	Bandon	13	4	1	8	197	217	4	22
10	Newport	13	5	0	8	156	227	2	22
11	Ennis	13	2	3	8	145	176	6	20
12	Muskerry	13	4	1	8	151	255	1	19
13	Scariff	13	3	1	9	167	293	3	17
14	Ballincollig	13	3	0	10	183	300	5	17

Munster Junior League Division 2 Results

Date	Venue	Opponents	Result (H-T)	Scorers for Killarney
9 October	Dirreen	St. Mary’s	6-13 (3-6)	Paudie Sheahan (2 pens)
16 October	Craven Park	Scariff	28-23 (7-18)	Pádraig Hallissey (try), Paul O'Sullivan (try), Paudie Sheahan (try, 4 convs), Brian O'Leary (try)
23 October	Freigh Park	Newport	N/A	Match postponed
6 November	Dirreen	Castleisland	17-11 (7-5)	Penalty try, Mike Nash (try), Paudie Sheahan (pen, 2 convs)
13 November	Cullinagh	Newcastle West	13-19 (10-10)	Mike Nash (try), Paudie Sheahan (2 pens, 1 conv)
20 November	Freigh Park	Newport	0-8 (0-8)	N/A
27 November	Dirreen	Ennis	22-10 (3-3)	Pádraig Hallissey (2 tries), Brian O'Leary (try), Paudie Sheahan (pen, 2 convs)
4 December	Ballyanly	Muskerry	18-6 (3-6)	Brian O'Sullivan (try), Mike Nash (try), Paudie Sheahan (2 pens, conv)
11 December	Dirreen	Youghal	N/A	Match postponed
2 January	Dirreen	Youghal	38-5 (19-5)	Pádraig Hallissey (2 tries), Mike Nash (3 tries), Brian O'Sullivan (try), Paudie Sheahan (4 convs)
15 January	Tanner Park	Ballincollig	21-19 (18-14)	Colin McCarthy (try), Eoin Deasy (try), Paudie Sheahan (3 pens, 1 conv)
22 January	Dirreen	Mallow	6-13 (6-7)	Paudie Sheahan (2 pens)
12 February	Oldchapel	Bandon	13-15 (10-5)	Pádraig Hallissey (try), Paudie Sheahan (2 pens, 1 conv)
4 March	Dirreen	Presentation	15-3 (12-0)	Brian O'Sullivan (2 tries), Paudie Sheahan (conv, pen)
25 March	Snugmore	Kinsale	22-27 (10-22)	Penalty try, Paul O'Sullivan (try), Gene McCarthy (try), Paudie Sheahan (pen, 2 convs)

Munster Junior Cup 2011-12

Date	Venue	Round	Opponents	Result (H-T)	Scorers for Killarney
4 December	N/A	1	N/A	N/A	N/A
18 December	Snugmore	2	Kinsale	W/O	N/A

Munster Junior Clubs Shield 2011

First Round
Kinsale	20
Muskerry	5
Bandon	10
Presentation	20
Scariff	10
Mallow	14
Newcastle West	17
St. Mary's	16
Ballincollig	w/o
Castleisland	--
Youghal	w/o
Ennis	--

Quarter-Finals
Killarney	8
Kinsale	39
Presentation	16
Mallow	7
Newport	3
Newcastle West	17
Ballincollig	34
Youghal	10

Semi-Finals
Kinsale	18
Presentation	19
Newcastle West	20
Ballincollig	13

Final
Presentation	13
Newcastle West	6

Date	Venue	Round	Opponents	Result (H-T)	Scorers for Killarney
11 September	N/A	1	N/A	Bye	N/A
18 September	Dirreen	2	Kinsale	8-39 (0-15)	Paudie Sheahan (pen); Conor O'Leary (try)

McElligott Cup 2011

First Round
28 August Langford St.
Killorglin	--
Castleisland	w/o

Semi-Finals
4 September Crageens
Castleisland	5
Killarney	6
28 August Baile Loisce
Corca Dhuibhne	13
Tralee	12

Final
1 October Crageens
Killarney	23
Corca Dhuibhne	3

Date	Venue	Round	Opponents	Result (H-T)	Scorers for Killarney
4 September	Crageens	Semi-Final	Castleisland	6-5 (0-0)	Paudie Sheahan (2 pens)
1 October	Crageens	Final	Corca Dhuibhne	23-3 (10-0)	Pádraig Hallissey (2 tries); Paudie Sheahan (3 pens, 2 convs)

=== 2nd XV ===
Starting XV v. Iveragh Eagles (15/01/2012)

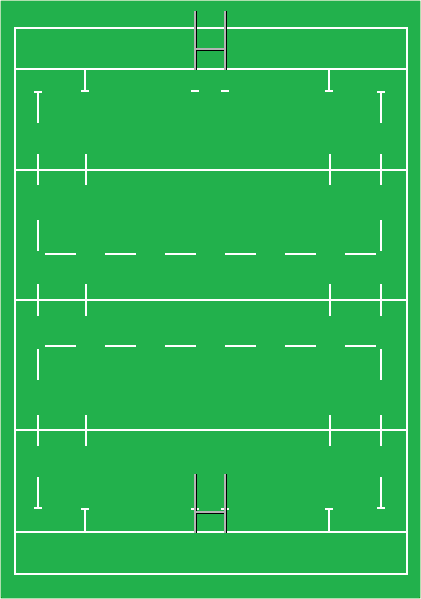

Munster Junior Two League (South) Section A Final Table

Pos	Team	Pld	W	D	L	PF	PA	BP	Pts
1	Tralee	8	8	0	0	193	68	4	36
2	Killarney	8	6	0	2	182	63	4	28
3	Iveragh Eagles	9	5	0	4	94	147	1	21
4	Castleisland	7	3	0	4	110	112	2	14
5	Kenmare	6	0	0	6	39	141	3	3
6	Listowel	6	0	0	6	57	167	1	1

Tralee advance to Phase 2 of J2 League
Killarney and Iveragh Eagles qualify for Mick Barry Cup

Munster Junior Two League (South) Section A Results

Date	Venue	Opponents	Result (H-T)	Scorers for Killarney
2 October	Dirreen	Kenmare	32-3 (17-3)	Tom O'Sullivan (3 tries), Cian Kingston (try, conv), John Friel (try), Conor O'Leary (try)
9 October	Cahersiveen	Iveragh	16-7 (9-0)	--
16 October	Dirreen	Listowel	38-0	--
23 October	Dirreen	Tralee	N/A	Match postponed
6 November	Crageens	Castleisland	29-3 (17-3)	--
13 November	Dirreen	Iveragh Eagles	22-10	Paul Moynihan (try), Shane McSweeney (try), Damien O'Carroll (try), Seán Hickey (pen, 2 convs)
20 November	Tralee Rd.	Listowel	31-11	--
27 November	O'Dowd Park	Tralee	14-29 (0-12)	Paul Moynihan (try), Shane McSweeney (try), Seán Hickey (conv), T.J. Linnane (conv)
4 December	Dirreen	Castleisland	N/A	Match postponed
11 December	Dromevane	Kenmare	N/A	Match postponed
17 December	Dirreen	Tralee	W/O	N/A
2 January	Dromevane	Kenmare	N/A	Match postponed
--	Dirreen	Castleisland	--	Match cancelled
--	Dromevane	Kenmare	--	Match cancelled

Mick Barry Cup Group A Final Table

Pos	Team	Pld	W	D	L	PF	PA	BP	Pts
1	Bandon	3	2	1	0	81	23	2	12
2	Clonakilty	3	2	1	0	41	6	1	11
3	Killarney	3	1	0	2	27	71	0	4
4	Iveragh Eagles	3	0	0	3	8	57	1	1

Mick Barry Cup Group A Results

Date	Venue	Opponents	Result (H-T)	Scorers for Killarney
15 January	Chapeltown	Iveragh Eagles	9-3 (0-3)	David Treacy (3 pens)
29 January	The Vale	Clonakilty	N/A	Match postponed
5 February	Dirreen	Bandon	15-30 (10-12)	Paul Moynihan (try), Ollie O'Neill (try), David Treacy (pen, conv)
12 February	The Vale	Clonakilty	3-38	David Treacy (pen)

Munster Junior Two Cup Result

Date	Venue	Round	Opponents	Result (H-T)	Scorers for Killarney
4 March	Tanner Park	1	Ballincollig	19-24	--

Dave Dineen Cup

First Round
Listowel	--
Carrigaline	w/o
U.C.C.	--
Dungarvan	w/o
Killarney	w/o
Cobh Pirates	--
Clonakilty	w/o
Kenmare	--

Quarter-Finals
Carrigaline	62
Dungarvan	26
Killarney	19
Clonakilty	18
Muskerry	22
Iveragh Eagles	49
Bandon	5
Dolphin	38

Semi-Finals
Carrigaline	26
Killarney	10
Iveragh Eagles	5
Dolphin	38

Final
Carrigaline	8
Dolphin	13

Fixtures / Results

Date	Venue	Round	Opponents	Result (H-T)	Scorers for Killarney
25 March	Dirreen	1	Cobh Pirates	W/O	N/A
1 April	Dirreen	Quarter-Final	Clonakilty	19-18 (14-3)	Connie O'Leary (try), Damien O'Carroll (2 tries), Cian Kingston (2 convs)
15 April	Moneygourney	Semi-Final	Carrigaline	10-26 (0-3)	Shane Sweeney (try), Cian Kingston (pen, conv)

Galwey-Foley Cup 2011/12

First Round
25 September Tralee Rd.
Listowel	0
Tralee	49
26 February Dirreen
Killarney	w/o
Castleisland	--

Semi-Finals
N/A Dromevane
Kenmare	--
Tralee	w/o
21 April Dirreen
Killarney	36
Iveragh Eagles	15

Final
28 April Dirreen
Tralee	5
Killarney	10

Date	Venue	Round	Opponents	Result (H-T)	Scorers for Killarney
26 February	Dirreen	1	Castleisland	w/o	N/A
21 April	Dirreen	Semi-Final	Iveragh Eagles	36-15 (12-10)	George Linehan (2 tries), Damien O'Carroll (try), Mike Henderson (try), John Friel (try), Cian Kingston (pen, 4 convs)
28 April	Dirreen	Final	Tralee	10-5 (3-0)	Mike Henderson (try), Cian Kingston (pen, conv)
