= 2015–16 British and Irish Cup =

2015–16 semiprofessional rugby cup

Tournament details
- Countries: England; Ireland; Wales
- Tournament format(s): Round-robin and knockout
- Date: 13 November 2015 — 10 April 2016

Tournament statistics
- Teams: 20
- Attendance: 72,839 (average 1,078 per match)
- Highest attendance: 5,273; Bristol v Ulster Ravens; 23 January 2016
- Lowest attendance: 100 (x2); Scarlets Premiership Select v Ulster Ravens; 21 November 2015; Connacht Eagles v Doncaster Knights; 16 January 2016
- Top point scorer(s): (England) Laurence May; Cornish Pirates 70 points
- Top try scorer(s): (Ireland) Dan Leavy; Leinster A 7 tries

Final
- Champions: London Welsh (1st title)
- Runners-up: Yorkshire Carnegie

The 2015–16 British and Irish Cup was the seventh season of the annual rugby union competition for second tier, semi-professional clubs from Britain and Ireland. Worcester Warriors were the defending champions having won the 2014–15 final against Doncaster Knights 35–5 at Castle Park, Doncaster on 3 April 2015. There have been five different winners and six different losing finalists of the competition in the six seasons of its existence. The format of the competition was similar to last season with Scottish clubs not competing. This season the four Welsh teams are the reserve sides of the teams competing in the Pro 12 competition instead of clubs from the Welsh Premier Division.

Matches were played on the same weekends as the European Rugby Champions and Challenge cups. First round matches began on 13 November 2015 and the final was held on 10 April 2016.

== Competition format ==
The competition format is a pool stage followed by a knockout stage. The pool stage consists of five pools of four teams playing home and away matches. The top side in each pool, plus the three best runners-up, will progress to the knockout stage. The eight quarter-finalists will be ranked, with top four teams having home advantage. The four winning quarter-finalists will progress to the semi-final draw. Matches take place on the same weekends as the European Rugby Champions and Challenge cups.

== Participating teams and locations ==
The allocation of teams is as follows:

- (England) – twelve clubs from RFU Championship
- (Ireland) – four Irish provinces represented by 'A' teams
- (Wales) – four Welsh regions represented by Premiership Select teams.
Locations of the 2015-16 British & Irish Cup teams

Club	Country	League	Stadium	Capacity	Area
Bedford Blues	England	RFU Championship	Goldington Road	5,000 (1,700 seats)	Bedford
Bristol	England	RFU Championship	Ashton Gate Stadium	21,497	Bristol
Cardiff Blues Premiership Select	Wales	N/A	Cardiff Arms Park	12,125	Cardiff
Connacht Eagles	Ireland	Irish Interprovincial Rugby Championship	Galway Sportsgrounds	9,500	Galway
Cornish Pirates	England	RFU Championship	Mennaye Field	4,000	Penzance
Doncaster Knights	England	RFU Championship	Castle Park rugby stadium	5,000	Doncaster
Ealing Trailfinders	England	RFU Championship	Trailfinders Sports Ground	3,020 (1,020 seats)	West Ealing, London
Jersey	(Jersey) England (Note: Jersey is listed in the English section because they play in the English RFU Championship.)	RFU Championship	St. Peter	5,000	Saint Peter
Leinster A	Ireland	Irish Interprovincial Rugby Championship	Donnybrook Stadium	6,000 (2,500 seats)	Dublin
London Scottish	England	RFU Championship	Richmond Athletic Ground	4,500 (1,000 seats)	Richmond, London
London Welsh	England	RFU Championship	Old Deer Park	5,850 (1,000 seats)	Richmond, London
Moseley	England	RFU Championship	Billesley Common	3,000+	Birmingham
Munster A	Ireland	Irish Interprovincial Rugby Championship	Snugmore; Rosbrien; New Ormond Park	7,500; 4,000; 1,000	Kinsale; Limerick; Nenagh
Newport Gwent Dragons Premiership Select	Wales	N/A	Pandy Park; The Bridge Field; Eugene Cross Park	3,000; 2,000; 8,000	Cross Keys; Bedwas; Ebbw Vale
Nottingham Rugby	England	RFU Championship	Lady Bay Sports Ground	2,000 (est)	Nottingham
Ospreys Premiership Select	Wales	N/A	Talbot Athletic Ground; Brewery Field; The Gnoll	3,000; 8,000; 5,000	Port Talbot; Bridgend; Neath
Rotherham Titans	England	RFU Championship	Clifton Lane	2,500	Rotherham
Scarlets Premiership Select	Wales	N/A	Carmarthen Park; Parc y Scarlets; Station Road	3,000; 14,870; 2,500	Carmarthen; Llanelli; Bristol
Ulster Ravens	Ireland	Irish Interprovincial Rugby Championship	Kingspan Stadium; Eaton Park; Deramore Park	18,196; 1,000; 1,000+	Belfast; Ballymena; Belfast
Yorkshire Carnegie	England	RFU Championship	Headingley Carnegie Stadium; Silver Royd; Lockwood Park	21,062; 1,950; 1,500	Leeds; Scalby; Huddersfield

== Pool stages ==
=== Pool 1 ===
Team	Pld	W	D	L	PF	PA	PD	TB	LB	Pts
(Ireland) Leinster A	6	6	0	0	240	92	+148	5	0	29
(England) Moseley	6	4	0	2	155	191	−36	4	0	20
(England) Rotherham Titans	6	2	0	4	155	120	+35	3	2	13
(England) Ealing Trailfinders	6	0	0	6	100	247	−147	1	1	2

Rules for classification: 4 points for a win; 2 points for a draw; 1 bonus point for a loss by seven points or less; 1 bonus point for scoring four or more tries in a match

14 November 2015
14:00

(BP) Rotherham Titans	9 – 12	Leinster A
	Report

Clifton Lane
Attendance: 1,017
Referee: Rhys Thomas

14 November 2015
15:00

(BP) Moseley	37 – 31	Ealing Trailfinders (2BP)
	Report

Billesley Common
Attendance: 818
Referee: Elia Rizo

20 November 2015
19:30

(BP) Leinster A	55 – 12	Moseley
	Report

Donnybrook
Attendance: 800
Referee: Mike Hudson

21 November 2015
15:00

Ealing Trailfinders	12 – 48	Rotherham Titans (BP)
	Report

Trailfinders Sports Ground
Attendance: 356
Referee: Jack Makepeace

11 December 2015
19:30

(BP) Leinster A	45 – 13	Ealing Trailfinders
	Report

Donnybrook
Attendance: 800
Referee: Craig Evans

12 December 2015
15:00

(BP) Moseley	26 – 10	Rotherham Titans
	Report

Billesley Common
Attendance: 591
Referee: Adam Jones

19 December 2015
15:00

Ealing Trailfinders	10 – 36	Leinster A (BP)
	Report

Trailfinders Sports Ground
Attendance: 804
Referee: Dan Jones

20 December 2015
14:00

(BP) Rotherham Titans	19 – 20	Moseley
	Report

Clifton Lane
Attendance: 681
Referee: Ben Blain

16 January 2016
14:00

Rotherham Titans	P – P	Ealing Trailfinders

Clifton Lane

- Postponed due to frozen pitch. Game rescheduled to 20 February 2016.

16 January 2016
15:00

(BP) Moseley	24 – 49	Leinster A (BP)
	Report

Billesley Common
Attendance: 773
Referee: Michael Hudson

22 January 2015
19:30

(BP) Leinster A	43 – 24	Rotherham Titans (BP)
	Report

Donnybrook
Attendance: 350
Referee: Dan Jones

23 January 2015
15:00

Ealing Trailfinders	27 – 36	Moseley (BP)
	Report

Trailfinders Sports Ground
Attendance: 456
Referee: Fergus Kirby

20 February 2016
14:00

(BP) Rotherham Titans	45 − 7	Ealing Trailfinders

Clifton Lane
Attendance: 618
Referee: Jack Makepeace

- Game rescheduled from 16 January 2016.

=== Pool 2 ===
Team	Pld	W	D	L	PF	PA	PD	TB	LB	Pts
(England) Bedford Blues	6	5	0	1	166	144	+22	4	0	24
(England) Bristol	6	4	0	2	200	112	+88	3	0	19
(Ireland) Ulster Ravens	6	2	0	4	112	143	−31	1	1	10
(Wales) Scarlets Premiership Select	6	1	0	5	114	193	−79	1	1	6

Rules for classification: 4 points for a win; 2 points for a draw; 1 bonus point for a loss by seven points or less; 1 bonus point for scoring four or more tries in a match

13 November 2015
19:30

Ulster Ravens	30 – 5	Bristol Rugby
	Report

Kingspan Stadium
Attendance: 1,607
Referee: Daniel Jones

15 November 2015
15:00

Scarlets Premiership Select	6 – 35	Bedford Blues (BP)
	Report

Carmarthen Park, Carmarthen
Attendance: 800
Referee: Frank Murphy

21 November 2015
14:30

Bedford Blues	27 – 18	Ulster Ravens
	Report

Goldington Road
Attendance: 2,303
Referee: Craig Evans

22 November 2015
15:00

(BP) Bristol Rugby	62 – 16	Scarlets Premiership Select
	Report

Ashton Gate
Attendance: 5,109
Referee: Sean Gallagher

11 December 2015
19:45

(BP) Bristol Rugby	52 – 3	Bedford Blues
	Report

Ashton Gate
Attendance: 4,615
Referee: Matthew O'Grady

12 December 2015
15:00

Scarlets Premiership Select	19 – 27	Ulster Ravens (BP)
	Report

Parc y Scarlets, Llanelli
Attendance: 100
Referee: Mike Hudson

19 December 2015
14:30

Ulster Ravens	7 – 23	Scarlets Premiership Select
	Report

Eaton Park, Ballymena
Attendance: 425
Referee: Christophe Ridley

19 December 2015
15:00

(BP) Bedford Blues	34 – 17	Bristol Rugby
	Report

Goldington Road
Attendance: 2,357
Referee: Nigel Correll

15 January 2016
19:30

(BP) Ulster Ravens	17 – 22	Bedford Blues (BP)
	Report

Deramore Park
Attendance: 600
Referee: David Jones

17 January 2016
15:00

Scarlets Premiership Select	16 – 17	Bristol Rugby
	Report

Station Road, Bristol (Note: Game was initially to be held at Church Bank Playing Fields (home of Llandovery) but due an unplayable pitch caused by heavy rain the fixture was switched to Station Road in Bristol (home of Clifton RFC and Bristol Rugby's training ground). Despite being held in Bristol it would be classed as a home game for the Scarlets with the gate fee going to that club.)
Attendance: 1,254
Referee: Frank Murphy

22 January 2016
19:45

(BP) Bristol Rugby	47 – 13	Ulster Ravens
	Report

Ashton Gate
Attendance: 5,273
Referee: Craig Evans

23 January 2016
15:00

(BP) Bedford Blues	45 – 34	Scarlets Premiership Select (BP)
	Report

Goldington Road
Attendance: 2,126
Referee: Stuart Gaffikin

=== Pool 3 ===
Team	Pld	W	D	L	PF	PA	PD	TB	LB	Pts
(England) Yorkshire Carnegie	6	5	0	1	202	98	+104	5	1	26
(England) London Scottish	6	4	0	2	151	144	+7	2	1	19
(Ireland) Munster A	6	3	0	3	153	134	+19	3	1	16
(Wales) Ospreys Premiership Select	6	0	0	6	81	211	−130	1	1	2

Rules for classification: 4 points for a win; 2 points for a draw; 1 bonus point for a loss by seven points or less; 1 bonus point for scoring four or more tries in a match

13 November 2015
19:45

(BP) London Scottish	27 – 25	Munster A (BP)
	Report

Athletic Ground
Attendance: 941
Referee: Rob Price

15 November 2015
13:30

(BP) Yorkshire Carnegie	32 – 10	Ospreys Premiership Select
	Report

Headingley (Note: Game was initially to be held at Laund Hill (home of Huddersfield YMCA) but due to an unplayable pitch caused by heavy rain the fixture was switched to Headingley.)
Attendance: 627
Referee: Sam Grove-White

20 November 2015
19:30

(BP) Ospreys Premiership Select	16 – 23	London Scottish
	Report

Talbot Athletic Ground, Port Talbot
Attendance: 325
Referee: Stuart Gaffkin

20 November 2015
20:00

Munster A	14 – 9	Yorkshire Carnegie (BP)
	Report

Snugmore, Kinsale
Attendance: 850
Referee: Fergus Kirby

11 December 2015
19:30

(BP) Munster A	28 – 8	Ospreys Premiership Select
	Report

Rosbrien, Limerick
Attendance: 527
Referee: Christophe Ridley

13 December 2015
14:30

(BP) Yorkshire Carnegie	56 – 6	London Scottish
	Report

Silver Royd, Scalby
Attendance: 580
Referee: Andrew Jackson

19 December 2015
15:00

(BP) London Scottish	24 – 29	Yorkshire Carnegie (BP)
	Report

Athletic Ground
Attendance: 882
Referee: Craig Evans

20 December 2015
15:00

(BP) Ospreys Premiership Select	26 – 46	Munster A (BP)
	Report

Brewery Field, Bridgend
Attendance: 375
Referee: Fergus Kirby

16 January 2016
15:00

(BP) London Scottish	49 – 7	Ospreys Premiership Select
	Report

Athletic Ground
Attendance: 849
Referee: Ben Blain

17 January 2016
15:00

Yorkshire Carnegie	43 – 29	Munster A (BP)
	Report

Lockwood Park, Huddersfield
Attendance: 584
Referee: Matthew Carley

23 January 2016
14:00

Munster A	11 – 21	London Scottish
	Report

New Ormond Park, Nenagh
Attendance: 300
Referee: Christophe Ridley

23 January 2016
14:00

Ospreys Premiership Select	14 – 33	Yorkshire Carnegie (BP)
	Report

The Gnoll, Neath
Attendance: 500
Referee: Sean Gallagher

=== Pool 4 ===
Team	Pld	W	D	L	PF	PA	PD	TB	LB	Pts
(Cornwall) Cornish Pirates	6	5	0	1	157	92	+65	2	1	23
(England) London Welsh	6	4	0	2	169	139	+30	3	1	20
(Wales) Cardiff Blues Premiership Select	6	1	1	4	117	141	−24	1	2	9
(England) Nottingham Rugby	6	1	1	4	82	153	−71	0	0	6

Rules for classification: 4 points for a win; 2 points for a draw; 1 bonus point for a loss by seven points or less; 1 bonus point for scoring four or more tries in a match

14 November 2015
14:30

Cardiff Blues Premiership Select	20 – 20	Nottingham Rugby
	Report

Cardiff Arms Park
Attendance: 664
Referee: Sean Gallagher

14 November 2015
15:00

Cornish Pirates	28 – 21	London Welsh (BP)
	Report

Mennaye Field
Attendance: 1,123
Referee: Greg Macdonald

21 November 2015
14:00

(BP) London Welsh	33 – 29	Cardiff Blues Premiership Select (2BP)
	Report

Old Deer Park
Attendance: 1,157
Referee: Frank Murphy

22 November 2015
15:00

Nottingham Rugby	7 – 19	Cornish Pirates
	Report

Lady Bay Sports Ground
Attendance: 953
Referee: Ben Blain

12 December 2015
14:00

(BP) London Welsh	42 – 17	Nottingham Rugby
	Report

Old Deer Park
Attendance: 836
Referee: Jack Makepeace

13 December 2015
15:00

Cardiff Blues Premiership Select	10 – 22	Cornish Pirates
	Report

Cardiff Arms Park
Attendance: 628
Referee: Frank Murphy

19 December 2015
15:00

(BP) Cornish Pirates	15 – 18	Cardiff Premiership Select
	Report

Mennaye Field
Attendance: 1,073
Referee: Stuart Gaffikin

20 December 2015
15:00

Nottingham Rugby	0 – 24	London Welsh
	Report

Lady Bay Sports Ground
Attendance: 874
Referee: Michael Hudson

16 January 2016
14:30

(BP) Cardiff Blues Premiership Select	30 – 32	London Welsh (BP)
	Report

Cardiff Arms Park
Attendance: 850
Referee: Fergus Kirby

17 January 2016
15:00

(BP) Cornish Pirates	38 – 19	Nottingham Rugby
	Report

Mennaye Field
Attendance: 1,160
Referee: Matt O'Grady

22 January 2016
19:45

Nottingham Rugby	19 – 10	Cardiff Premiership Select
	Report

Lady Bay Sports Ground
Attendance: 1,018
Referee: Frank Murphy

23 January 2016
14:00

London Welsh	17 – 35	Cornish Pirates (BP)
	Report

Old Deer Park
Attendance: 959
Referee: Steve Lee

=== Pool 5 ===
Team	Pld	W	D	L	PF	PA	PD	TB	LB	Pts
(England) Doncaster Knights	6	4	1	1	173	84	+89	3	1	22
Jersey	6	4	1	1	189	105	+84	3	0	21
(Wales) Newport Gwent Dragons Premiership Select	6	3	0	3	119	134	−15	1	1	14
(Ireland) Connacht Eagles	6	0	0	6	40	198	−158	0	1	1

Rules for classification: 4 points for a win; 2 points for a draw; 1 bonus point for a loss by seven points or less; 1 bonus point for scoring four or more tries in a match

14 November 2015
14:30

Connacht Eagles	10 – 34	Newport Dragons Premiership Select (BP)
	Report

Sportsground
Attendance: 125
Referee: Matthew O'Grady

14 November 2015
14:30

Jersey	22 – 22	Doncaster Knights
	Report

St Peter
Attendance: 1,772
Referee: Fergus Kirby

21 November 2015
14:30

(BP) Doncaster Knights	22 – 5	Connacht Eagles
	Report

Castle Park
Attendance: 1,245
Referee: Dan Jones

22 November 2015
15:00

Newport Dragons Premiership Select	30 – 27	Jersey (BP)
	Report

Pandy Park, Cross Keys
Attendance: 200
Referee: Christopher Ridley

12 December 2015
14:30

Connacht Eagles	10 – 40	Jersey (BP)
	Report

Sportsground
Attendance: 225
Referee: Dan Jones

12 December 2015
14:30

Doncaster Knights	21 – 16	Newport Gwent Dragons Premiership Select (BP)
	Report

Castle Park
Attendance: 1,051
Referee: Stuart Gaffikin

19 December 2015
14:00

(BP) Jersey	52 – 12	Connacht Eagles
	Report

St Peter
Attendance: 1,648
Referee: Jack Makepeace

19 December 2015
15:00

Newport Gwent Dragons Premiership Select	17 – 49	Doncaster Knights (BP)
	Report

The Bridge Field, Bedwas
Attendance: 200
Referee: Sean Gallagher

16 January 2015
13:00

Connacht Eagles	0 – 40	Doncaster Knights
	Report

Sportsground
Attendance: 100
Referee: Adam Jones

16 January 2015
14:30

Jersey	24 – 12	Newport Gwent Dragons Premiership Select
	Report

St Peter
Attendance: 1,606
Referee: Nigel Correll

23 January 2015
14:00

(BP) Doncaster Knights	19 – 24	Jersey
	Report

Castle Park
Attendance: 1,386
Referee: Michael Hudson

23 January 2015
15:00

Newport Gwent Dragons Premiership Select	10 – 3	Connacht Eagles (BP)
	Report

Eugene Cross Park, Ebbw Vale
Attendance: 400
Referee: Matthew O'Grady

== Knock-out stage ==
The eight qualifiers are seeded according to performance in the pool stage, and competed in the quarter-finals, which are held on the weekend of 11/12/13 March 2016. The four top seeds host the quarter-finals against the lower seeds, in a 1 v 8, 2 v 7, 3 v 6 and 4 v 5 format. However, if two teams have qualified from the same group then they cannot be drawn together despite the seeding. Hence Leinster A and Moseley were not drawn together leading to a 1 v 7, 2 v 8, 3 v 6, 4 v 5 format.

Teams are ranked by:

1 – competition points (4 for a win, 2 for a draw)
2 – where competition points are equal, greatest number of wins
3 – where the number of wins are equal, aggregate points difference
4 – where the aggregate points difference are equal, greatest number of points scored

Seed	Pool Winners	Pts	Wins	Pts diff
1	(Ireland) Leinster A	29	6	148
2	(England) Yorkshire Carnegie	26	5	104
3	(England) Bedford Blues	24	5	22
4	(England) Cornish Pirates	23	5	65
5	(England) Doncaster Knights	22	4	89
Seed	Pool Runners–up	Pts	Wins	Pts diff
6	(England) Jersey	21	4	84
7	(England) London Welsh	20	4	30
8	(England) Moseley	20	4	–36
9	(England) Bristol	19	4	88
10	(England) London Scottish	19	4	7

Quarter-finals
12 March 2016 - Donnybrook
(Ireland) Leinster A	39
(England) London Welsh	45
13 March 2016 - Mennaye Field
(Cornwall) Cornish Pirates	38
(England) Doncaster Knights	19
11 March 2016 - Goldington Road
(England) Bedford Blues	15
Jersey	19
13 March 2016 - Headingley Stadium
(England) Yorkshire Carnegie	50
(England) Moseley	3

Semi-finals
19 March 2016 - Old Deer Park
London Welsh	36
Cornish Pirates	15
20 March 2016 - Headingley Stadium
Yorkshire Carnegie	33
Jersey	32

Final
10 April 2016 - Headingley Stadium
Yorkshire Carnegie	10
London Welsh	33

=== Quarter-finals ===
11 March 2016
19:45

Bedford Blues	15 – 19	Jersey
	Report

Goldington Road
Attendance: 2,455
Referee: Frank Murphy

12 March 2016
19:00

Leinster A	39 – 45	London Welsh
	Report

Donnybrook
Attendance: 932
Referee: Craig Evans

13 March 2016
15:00

Cornish Pirates	38 – 19	Doncaster Knights
	Report

Mennaye Field
Attendance: 1,136
Referee: Stuart Townsend

13 March 2016
15:00

Yorkshire Carnegie	50 – 3	Moseley
	Report

Headingley Stadium
Attendance: 715
Referee: Christophe Ridley

=== Semi-finals ===
19 March 2016
12:30

London Welsh	36 - 15	Cornish Pirates
	Report

Old Deer Park
Attendance: 642
Referee: Andrew Jackson

20 March 2016
15:00

Yorkshire Carnegie	33 - 32	Jersey
	Report

Headingley Stadium
Attendance: 626
Referee: Sean Gallagher

=== Final ===
10 April 2016
15:00

Yorkshire Carnegie	10 - 33	London Welsh
	Report

Headingley Stadium
Attendance: 3,107
Referee: Craig Evans

== Attendances ==
Club	Home Games	Total	Average	Highest	Lowest	% Capacity
Bedford Blues	4	9,241	2,310	2,455	2,126	46%
Bristol Rugby	3	14,997	4,999	5,273	4,615	23%
Cardiff Premiership Select	3	2,142	714	850	628	6%
Connacht Eagles	3	450	150	225	100	2%
Cornish Pirates	4	4,492	1,123	1,160	1,073	28%
Doncaster Knights	3	3,682	1,227	1,386	1,051	25%
Ealing Trailfinders	3	1,616	539	804	356	18%
Jersey	3	5,026	1,675	1,772	1,606	34%
Leinster A	4	2,882	721	932	350	12%
London Scottish	3	2,672	891	941	849	20%
London Welsh	4	3,594	899	1,157	642	15%
Moseley	3	2,182	727	818	591	24%
Munster A	3	1,677	559	850	300	18%
Newport Gwent Dragons Premiership Select	3	800	267	400	200	7%
Nottingham Rugby	3	2,845	948	1,018	874	47%
Ospreys Premiership Select	3	1,200	400	500	325	9%
Rotherham Titans	3	2,316	772	1,017	618	31%
Scarlets Premiership Select	3	2,154	718	1,254	100	26%
Ulster Ravens	3	2,632	877	1,607	425	37%
Yorkshire Carnegie	6	6,239	1,040	3,107	580	15%

== Individual statistics ==
- Note if players are tied on tries or points the player with the lowest number of appearances is placed first (if they have the same number of games, then the less minutes played will rank first). Also note that points scorers includes tries as well as conversions, penalties and drop goals. Appearance figures also include coming on as substitutes (unused substitutes not included).

=== Top points scorers ===
Rank	Player	Team	Appearances	Points
1	(England) Laurence May	Cornish Pirates	8	70
2	(England) Kevin Sinfield	Yorkshire Carnegie	6	53
3	(Ireland) Peter Lydon	London Scottish	5	51
4	(Wales) Gareth Davies	Cardiff Blues Premiership Select	4	42
5	(England) Olly Barkley	London Welsh	8	38
6	(Australia) Sam Windsor	Ulster Ravens	6	37
7	(Wales) Josh Lewis	Scarlets Premiership Select	6	36
8	(Ireland) Cathal Marsh	Leinster A	3	35
9	(Ireland) Dan Leavy	Leinster A	6	35
10	(Tonga) Uili Koloʻofai	Jersey	8	35

=== Top try scorers ===
Rank	Player	Team	Appearances	Tries
1	(Ireland) Dan Leavy	Leinster A	6	7
2	(Tonga) Uili Koloʻofai	Jersey	8	7
3	(England) Chris Walker	Yorkshire Carnegie	5	6
4	(Wales) James Lewis	London Welsh	7	6
5	(England) Josh Bainbridge	Yorkshire Carnegie	3	5
6	(England) Tom Howe	Jersey	6	5
7	(Tonga) Latu Makaafi	Doncaster Knights	6	5
8	(England) Taylor Prell	Yorkshire Carnegie	7	5
9	(England) James Freeman	Jersey	8	5
10	(England) Andy Saull	Yorkshire Carnegie	2	4

== Season records ==
=== Team ===
Largest home win — 50 pts

56 - 6 Yorkshire Carnegie at home to London Scottish on 13 December 2015

Largest away win — 40 pts

40 - 0 Doncaster Knights away to Connacht Eagles on 16 January 2015

Most points scored — 62

62 - 16 Bristol Rugby at home to Scarlets Premiership Select on 22 November 2015

Most tries in a match — 9

Bristol Rugby at home to Scarlets Premiership Select on 22 November 2015

Most conversions in a match — 7 (x4)

Bristol Rugby at home to Scarlets Premiership Select on 22 November 2015
Doncaster Knights away to Newport Gwent Dragons Premiership Select on 19 December 2015
London Scottish at home to Ospreys Premiership Select on 16 January 2016
Leinster A away to Moseley on 16 January 2016

Most penalties in a match — 4 (x3)

Cornish Pirates away to Nottingham Rugby on 22 November 2015
Rotherham Titans at home to Moseley on 20 December 2015
Newport Gwent Dragons Premiership Select away to Jersey on 16 January 2016

Most drop goals in a match — 1

Leinster A away to Rotherham Titans on 14 November 2015

=== Player ===
Most points in a match — 22

(Wales) Matthew Morgan for Bristol Rugby at home to Ulster Ravens on 23 January 2016

Most tries in a match — 4 (x2)

(Tonga) Uili Koloʻofai for Jersey away to Connacht Eagles on 12 December 2015
(England) Andy Saull for Yorkshire Carnegie at home to Munster A on 17 January 2016

Most conversions in a match — 7 (x3)

(Wales) Gavin Henson for Bristol Rugby at home to Scarlets Premiership Select on 22 November 2015
(Ireland) Peter Lydon for London Scottish at home to Ospreys Premiership Select on 16 January 2016
(Ireland) Cathal Marshal for Leinster A away to Moseley on 16 January 2016

Most penalties in a match — 4 (x2)

(England) Laurence May for Cornish Pirates away to Nottingham Rugby on 22 November 2015
(Wales) Rhys Jones for Newport Gwent Dragons Premiership Select away to Jersey on 16 January 2016

Most drop goals in a match — 1

(Ireland) Ross Byrne for Leinster A away to Rotherham Titans on 14 November 2015

=== Attendances ===
Highest — 5,273

Bristol Rugby at home to Ulster Ravens on 23 January 2016

Lowest — 100 (x2)

Scarlets Premiership Select at home to Ulster Ravens on 21 November 2015
Connacht Eagles at home to Doncaster Knights on 16 January 2016

Highest Average Attendance — 4,999

Bristol Rugby

Lowest Average Attendance — 150

Connacht Eagles
