= Darragh Hurley =

Irish rugby union player

- Born: 8 October 1985 (age 41) Kinsale, County Cork, Ireland
- Height: 1.85 m (6 ft 1 in)
- Weight: 112 kg (17.6 st; 247 lb)
- School: Christian Brothers College
- University: University College Cork

Rugby union career
- Position: Prop
Senior career
Years	Team	Apps	(Points)
2006–2012	Munster	36	(5)
- Correct as of 8 June 2011
International career
Years	Team	Apps	(Points)
2008	Ireland A	1	(0)
- Correct as of 15 December 2011

Darragh Hurley (8 October 1985) is a retired Irish rugby union player, who played for Irish provincial side Munster in the Pro12 and Heineken Cup. Hurley played his club rugby with Cork Constitution in the All-Ireland League. His position was prop, usually loosehead.

== Early life ==
Hurley began playing rugby union with his local rugby club Kinsale RFC at the age of 8. Hurley then made the move to Christian Brothers College Cork where he played Senior Cup rugby and was victorious in 2003. When Hurley left school he joined UCC where he remained for two years.

== Munster ==
He then went on to join Munster as an academy player. Hurley made his senior debut for Munster in a Celtic League fixture against Border Reivers on 9 September 2006, playing the full 80 minutes. He made his Heineken Cup debut for Munster against Cardiff Blues on 10 December 2006. He then made his first start in the Heineken Cup on 16 December 2006, in the reverse fixture against Cardiff Blues. Hurley scored his first try for Munster in their Round 6 2010–11 Heineken Cup clash with London Irish on 22 January 2011.

== Ireland ==
Hurley has also represented Ireland at schoolboy level and was part of the U-21 team that partook in the U-21 Rugby World Cup in France in 2003.

He earned his first cap for Ireland A on 23 February 2008, during the 67–7 defeat at the hands of Scotland A.

Hurley was also a member of the Ireland A Churchill Cup squad that won the plate final at the 2008 competition.

== Retirement ==
Hurley was forced to retire from rugby in May 2012, due to a lower back injury that he suffered in October 2011.
