= Jim Tydings =

Irish rugby union player

- Full name: John Joseph Tydings
- Born: 26 June 1945 Limerick, Ireland
- Died: 24 August 2019 (aged 74) Limerick, Ireland

Rugby union career
- Position: Wing
International career
| Years | Team | Apps | (Points) |
| 1968 | Ireland | 1 | (0) |

John Joseph Tydings (26 June 1945 – 24 August 2019) was an Irish international rugby union player.

A native of Limerick, Tydings played his rugby with Thomond, Young Munster and Munster, with a one-off Ireland appearance in 1968, featuring on the wing in their win over Australia at Lansdowne Road.

Tydings was also a soccer player for Ballynanty Rovers and Limerick FC, as a centre-forward and outside-left.

== See also ==
- List of Ireland national rugby union players
