= Six Nations Women's U21 Series =

Rugby tournament

- Current season, competition or edition: 2026 Six Nations Women's U21 Series
- Formerly: Six Nations Women's U20 Summer Series (2024–2025)
- Sport: Rugby union
- Founded: 2024; 2 years ago
- First season: 2024
- No. of teams: 6
- Countries: England; France; Ireland; Italy; Scotland; Wales
- Most recent champion: France (2026)
- Most titles: France (3 titles)
- Website: www.sixnationsrugby.com

The Six Nations Women's U21 Series (formerly the Six Nations Women's U20 Summer Series) is an annual international rugby union competition featuring the under-21 women's national teams of England, France, Ireland, Italy, Scotland, and Wales. The tournament serves as a development pathway for young players progressing to senior international rugby.

== History ==
The competition was established in 2024 as the Six Nations Women's U20 Summer Series, with the inaugural edition hosted in Parma, Italy in July 2024. The tournament was created to provide competitive international experience for emerging players and strengthen the pathway to the senior Women's Six Nations Championship teams.

In January 2026, the Six Nations announced a significant restructure of the competition. The tournament was rebranded as the Six Nations Women's U21 Series and underwent a format change. The age limit was raised to predominantly feature players under 21, with teams permitted to select a limited number of players up to age 23. This change was designed to make the pathway to international honours more accessible and better align with player development needs.

The competition has proven successful in developing players, with 14 graduates from the inaugural 2024 tournament earning senior international caps during the 2025 Women's Six Nations Championship.

== Format ==
=== 2024–2025: Festival format ===
The first two editions of the tournament (2024 and 2025) followed a week-long festival format, with all six teams competing in a single host location. The 2024 edition took place in Parma, Italy, while the 2025 edition was held at the Centre for Sporting Excellence in Ystrad Mynach, Wales.

All matches were streamed live on the Six Nations YouTube.

=== 2026–2027: Home and away format ===
Beginning in 2026, the format evolved to feature a mix of home and away fixtures, with teams playing either two home fixtures and one away, or vice versa. This format change was designed to replicate the training week and travel elements of the Women's Six Nations, preparing players for senior international rugby.

== Eligibility ==
While the tournament predominantly features players age 21 or younger, teams are permitted to select a limited number of players up to the age of 23.

== Tournament winners ==
Year	Host(s)	Winner	Runner-up	Third place	Ref
2024	Parma	France	Italy	England	
2025	Ystrad Mynach	France	England	Ireland	
2026	—N/a	France	Ireland	England	

== See also ==
- Women's Six Nations Championship
- Six Nations Under 20s Championship
- Women's international rugby union
