= Kinsale Sevens =

- Sport: Rugby Sevens
- Founded: 1998
- Founder: Kinsale Rugby Football Club
- Country: Ireland
- Website: Kinsale Sevens

The Kinsale Sevens (also known as Heineken Kinsale Sevens, Kinsale Sevens By The Sea) is Ireland and Europe's premier seven-a-side club rugby event. The event takes place across the May Bank Holiday Weekend (Friday to Sunday) at the Kinsale Rugby Football Club, Kinsale, Ireland and sees teams from around the world compete against each other in ladies', men's (junior and senior) and veteran competitions.

== Format ==
Participants find themselves battling it out over a two-day period (Saturday and Sunday - traditionally, the Friday is dedicated to a fun 10-a-side competition) with the finals of the feature events taking place on the Sunday.

Day	Men's Senior	Men's Junior	Ladies'	Veterans
Saturday	Senior Cup	Junior Competition Qualifiers	Ladies' Competition Day 1	Men's 10s
Sunday	Senior Competition	Junior Competition Finals	Ladies' Competition Day 2	

The event is open to everyone and applications to participate can be submitted to the official website.

== Notable past winners ==
- South Sea Drifters (Fiji)
- Kooga Wailers (Eng)
- Wekas (NZ)
- Marauders (Eng)
- De La Salle Palmerston (Irl)
- Clontarf RFC (Irl)
- Cork Constitution (Irl)
- Garryowen Football Club (Irl)
- Shannon RFC (Irl)
- Gloucester Rugby (Eng)
- Waterpark (Irl)
- Dungannon RFC (Irl)
- Fiji Babaas (Fiji)
- Susie Saloons (Netherlands)
- Seven Minute Abs (Irl)
