= Ireland women's national under-21 rugby union team =

Ireland's national women's under-21 rugby union team

Ireland U-21 Women
- Union: Irish Rugby Football Union
- Ground: Various
- Coach: Niamh Briggs

The Ireland women's national under-21 rugby union team represents Ireland in women's age-grade international rugby union at under-21 level. The team is governed by the Irish Rugby Football Union (IRFU). From 2026, the team competes in the Six Nations Women's U21 Series, having previously competed as an under-20 side in the Six Nations Women's U20 Summer Series. The team is coached by former Ireland international Niamh Briggs.

== Squad ==
Squad for 2026 Six Nations U21 Series

Name	Position	Club/Province
Jemima Adams Verling	Lock	Galwegians RFC / (Ireland) Connacht
Gabby Brown	Lock	(England) Ealing Trailfinders (IQ Rugby)
Ella Buckley	Prop	Ballincollig RFC / (Ireland) Munster
Grainne Burke	Prop	UL Bohemian RFC / (Ireland) Munster
Ella Burns	Prop	Galwegians RFC / (Ireland) Connacht
Aoife Corcoran	Flanker	(Ireland) Leinster
Annakate Cournane	Flanker	Shannon RFC / (Ireland) Munster
Saoirse Crowe	Prop/Hooker	UL Bohemian RFC / (Ireland) Munster
Sarah Delaney	Hooker	Blackrock RFC / (Ireland) Leinster
Emma Dunican	Flanker	UL Bohemian RFC / (Ireland) Munster
Alisha Flynn	Prop	Ballincollig RFC / (Ireland) Munster
Poppy Garvey	Number 8	Railway Union RFC / (Ireland) Connacht
Sally Kelly	Flanker	Ennis RFC / (Ireland) Munster
Roisin Maher	Prop	(England) Gloucester–Hartpury (IQ Rugby)
Aoibheann McGrath	Lock	Ballincollig RFC / (Ireland) Munster
Orlaith Morrissey	Lock	(Ireland) Munster
Aoibhe O’Flynn	Lock	UL Bohemian RFC / (Ireland) Munster
Ailish Quinn	Flanker	Galwegians RFC / (Ireland) Connacht
Rosie Searle	Lock	Navan RFC / (Ireland) Leinster
Naoise Smyth	Lock	Ashbourne RFC / (Ireland) Leinster
Lyndsay Clarke	Wing/Full Back	Ennis RFC / (Ireland) Munster
Alex Connor	Scrum Half	Navan RFC / (Ireland) Leinster
Katie Corrigan	Wing	Old Belvedere RFC / (Ireland) Leinster
Emily Foley	Wing/Full Back	Galwegians RFC / (Ireland) Connacht
Siofra Hession	Fly Half	Galwegians RFC / (Ireland) Connacht
Leah Irwin	Centre	Enniskillen RFC / (Ireland) Ulster
Aoibhe Kelly	Scrum Half	(England) Loughborough Lightning / (Ireland) Leinster
Lucia Linn (Captain)	Centre	UL Bohemian RFC / (Ireland) Munster
Heidi Lyons	Full Back	Railway Union RFC / (Ireland) Leinster
Niamh Murphy	Centre	Galwegians RFC / (Ireland) Leinster
Robyn O’Connor	Wing/Full Back	Wexford Wanderers RFC / (Ireland) Leinster
Teni Onigbode	Scrum Half	Clontarf RFC / (Ireland) Leinster
Ellie O’Sullivan Sexton	Fly Half	Old Belvedere RFC / (Ireland) Leinster
Chisom Ugwueru	Wing	UL Bohemian RFC / (Ireland) Munster
Ava Usanova	Wing/Full Back	Railway Union RFC / (Ireland) Leinster

== Results ==
=== Results summary ===
The following table shows Ireland's U20 and U21 record against each opponent.

Correct as of 18 April 2026

Opponent	First game	Played	Won	Drawn	Lost	Win %
Canada U21	2026	1	0	0	1	0%
England U20/21	2024	2	1	0	1	50%
France U20/21	2025	1	0	0	1	0%
Italy U20/21	2023	3	1	0	2	33.33%
Scotland U20/21	2023	3	2	0	1	66.67%
Wales U20/21	2025	2	2	0	0	100%

==== Overall record ====
Correct as of 10 May 2026

Played	Won	Drawn	Lost	Win %
12	6	0	6	50%

=== Match list ===
The following is a list of Ireland women's national under-21 rugby union team matches. The team was formally known as known as the Ireland women's national under-20 rugby union team.

Won	Lost	Draw

==== Competitive matches ====
Date	Opponent	PF	PA	Venue	Competition	Refs
4 July 2024	England U20	10	33	Stadio Sergio Lanfranchi	2024 Six Nations Women's U20 Summer Series	
9 July 2024	Italy U20	17	24	Stadio Sergio Lanfranchi	2024 Six Nations Women's U20 Summer Series	
14 July 2024	Scotland U20	37	7	Stadio Sergio Lanfranchi	2024 Six Nations Women's U20 Summer Series	
5 July 2025	Wales U20	27	19	Centre for Sporting Excellence	2025 Six Nations Women's U20 Summer Series	
11 July 2025	France U20	12	41	Centre for Sporting Excellence	2025 Six Nations Women's U20 Summer Series	
17 July 2025	Scotland U20	62	7	Centre for Sporting Excellence	2025 Six Nations Women's U20 Summer Series	
18 April 2026	Italy U21	55	8	Dexcom Stadium	2026 Six Nations Women's U21 Series	
2 May 2026	England U21	41	40	Butts Park Arena	2026 Six Nations Women's U21 Series	
2 May 2026	Wales U21	31	17	Centre for Sporting Excellence	2026 Six Nations Women's U21 Series	

==== Friendly / one-off matches ====
Date	Opponent	PF	PA	Venue	Refs
28 July 2023	Italy U20	14	17	Stadio Tommaso Fattori	
28 July 2023	Scotland U20	12	21	Stadio Tommaso Fattori	
15 March 2026	Canada U21	24	48	Dublin	
