= Tony Courtney =

Irish rugby union player

- Full name: Anthony William Courtney
- Born: 19 May 1899 Nenagh, Ireland
- Died: 3 January 1970 (aged 70) Limerick, Ireland

Rugby union career
- Position: Forward
International career
Years	Team	Apps	(Points)
1920–21	Ireland	7	(0)

Anthony William Courtney (19 May 1899 — 3 January 1970) was an Irish international rugby union player.

Born in Nenagh, County Tipperary, Courtney was the youngest son of a doctor and underwent his early education at the local Christian Brothers school, before moving on to Clongowes Wood College in 1914. He studied medicine at University College Dublin (UCD).

Courtney was a member of the Garryowen side that won the Munster Senior Cup in 1920, the year he gained his first call up to the national team. He was capped seven times for Ireland over two years, playing as a forward. While attending UCD, Courtney played on the varsity XV and featured in their 1924 Leinster Senior Cup-winning side. He also appeared for his hometown club Nenagh Ormond.

After qualifying as a doctor, Courtney was a house surgeon at St Vincent's Hospital, medical officer for Nenagh no. 2 district and coroner for North Tipperary.

Courtney was the uncle of murdered Irish prelate Michael Courtney.

== See also ==
- List of Ireland national rugby union players
