= 2026 Six Nations Women's U21 Series =

Rugby union tournament

- Countries: England; France; Ireland; Italy; Scotland; Wales
- Date: 18 April – 10 May 2026

Official website
- www.sixnationsrugby.com

The 2026 Six Nations Women's U21 Series is the third edition of the Six Nations Women's age-grade rugby union competition, and the first under the new U21 format.

The competition will run from 18 April to 10 May 2026, with fixtures scheduled to align with the 2026 Women's Six Nations Championship, allowing for double-header weekends.

== Format changes ==
=== Changes from U20 Summer Series ===
Unlike the previous festival format used in 2024 and 2025, where all six teams competed at a single host venue over one week. The new format features home and away fixtures spread across three weekends in April and May.

Each team plays three matches, with teams playing either two home fixtures and one away, or one home fixture and two away. This structure is designed to replicate the training week and travel elements of the senior Women's Six Nations Championship.

=== Age eligibility ===
From 2026, teams are permitted to select up to five players aged 23 or under in their squads.

== Table ==
Pos	Team	Pld	W	D	L	PF	PA	PD	TF	TA	TB	LB	Pts
1	France	3	3	0	0	260	22	+238	42	4	3	0	15
2	Ireland	3	3	0	0	127	65	+62	21	10	3	0	15
3	England	3	1	0	2	108	124	−16	18	22	2	1	7
4	Italy	3	1	0	2	71	110	−39	10	18	2	1	7
5	Wales	3	1	0	2	55	136	−81	6	31	1	0	5
6	Scotland	3	0	0	3	34	198	−164	6	31	1	0	1

Updated to match(es) played on 2 May 2026. Source:

Table ranking rules

- Four points are awarded for a win.
- Two points are awarded for a draw.
- A bonus point is awarded to a team that scores four or more tries, or loses by seven points or fewer.

== Fixtures ==
Fixtures were announced in January 2026.

=== Round 1 ===
18 April 2026
11:00 BST

Scotland	12–51	England (1 BP)
	Report

Edinburgh Rugby Stadium, Edinburgh
Referee: Alexandra Ferré (France)

18 April 2026
14:20 BST

(1 BP) Ireland	55–8	Italy
	Report

Dexcom Stadium, Galway
Referee: Amber Stamp-Dunstan (Wales)

18 April 2026
18:15 BST

Wales	5–76	France (1 BP)
	Report

Cardiff Arms Park, Cardiff
Referee: Beatrice Smussi (Italy)

=== Round 2 ===
2 May 2026
14:00 EST

(1 BP) France	113-0	Scotland

Stade Maurice Trélut, Tarbes
Referee: Giana Viljoen (South Africa)

2 May 2026
15:00 BST

(2 BP) England	40-41	Ireland (1 BP)

Butts Park Arena, Coventry
Referee: Bérénice Loubet-Bralley (France)

2 May 2026
13:30 EST

(2 BP) Italy	29-33	Wales (1 BP)

Rugby Lyons Piacenza 1963, Piacenza
Referee: Emma Gallagher (Canada)

=== Round 3 ===
10 May 2026
TBC

Scotland	22-34	Italy

Edinburgh Rugby Stadium, Edinburgh
Referee: Emily Hope (England)

10 May 2026
TBC

Wales	17-31	Ireland

Centre for Sporting Excellence, Ystrad Mynach
Referee: Giana Viljoen (South Africa)

10 May 2026
15:00 BST

England	17-71	France

Goldington Road, Bedford
Referee: Emma Gallagher (Canada)

== See also ==
- 2026 Women's Six Nations Championship
- 2026 Six Nations Under 20s Championship
- 2026 Six Nations Championship
