= Killarney RFC =

Irish rugby union club in Killarney, Co. Kerry

- Full name: Killarney Rugby Football Club
- Union: (Ireland) IRFU
- Branch: Munster
- Founded: 1928; 98 years ago (re-established 1953, 1983)
- Ground(s): Caher, Aghadoe, Killarney
- Chairman: Ger Moynihan
- President: Luke O'Sullivan
- Coach: Ger Moynihan / John O'Connell /Declan Fuller
- Captain: Matt McAuliffe
- League: Munster Junior League Division 3
1st kit	2nd kit

Official website
- killarneyrugby.com

Killarney Rugby Football Club is a rugby union club based in Killarney, County Kerry, Ireland. It is affiliated to the Munster Branch of the Irish Rugby Football Union. The club competes in Division 3 of the Munster Junior League. While a club existed in the town as far back as the end of the 19th century it wasn't until 1983 that the club in its current format was founded. Killarney currently have one senior sides as well as a large underage and mini set-up, and runs a successful Tag Rugby league during the summer months.

== History ==
=== The early years ===
Killarney's earliest recorded links with rugby date back to the 1800s, notable players of the era were Jack McKay and MacGillycuddy of the Reeks. Early matches were played in the Cricket Field, a piece of ground on the northern banks of the Flesk opposite the Gleneagle pitch and putt course.

The earliest recorded game is detailed in the archives of Laune Rangers GAA, which recounts a match between Killarney and Killorglin in January 1888 "the beginning" followed by a return in Killorglin the following month.

This was not a one-off as there are newspaper reports the following year of a match between Tralee and Killarney on Thursday, 17 January 1889. The score was one try a piece.

=== 1898 Revival ===
Whilst there are no records of an official club being founded before this time, there are reports of a "large and enthusiastic public meeting" being held on 22 November 1898 to revive Killarney Rugby Football Club. According to records from the time this meeting got a great response and within a couple of months rugby was once again flourishing in Killarney.

=== 1928 Revival ===
In 1928 that Killarney RFC was again reformed after an interested group managed to secure a playing field at Countess Road from the Earl of Kenmare. The club was founded at a meeting in the Commercial Club, New St., Killarney on 28 April 1928. At the time the club had players who had senior experience with clubs such as Cork Constitution, Dolphin, Sunday's Well and U.C.C. They enjoyed relative success for a number of years but by the mid-1930s things began to decline. Initially emigration and then the Emergency resulted in the club ceasing to function. However a number of locals did form a team in 1941 and won the Galwey-Foley Cup beating Castleisland in the Final. It was almost 20 years before the club was re-established again.

=== 1953 Reestablishment post Emergency ===
The club was established again in time for the 1953/54 season and almost immediately enjoyed success which continued right up to the 1970s. The club won both the McGillycuddy Cup and Galwey-Foley Cup in both 1954/55 and 1955/56 and also reached the semi-finals of the Munster Junior Cup in 1955/56. Also that season Welsh side Aberavon visited and played Killarney. The following year they lost the Cork County Cup Final to Cobh Pirates but became the first Kerry side to tour 'overseas' when they travelled to Wales to play Port Talbot and Margan.

Killarney won the Aberavon Shield in 1957/58 and the following season they were involved in an epic Galwey-Foley Cup Final encounter with their neighbours and great rivals Castleisland. The sides could not be separated after three matches including extra-time. The club won the Hayes Cup in 1959/60 and again in 1961/62. The club continued to have success until it was wound up in the early 1970s.

=== The club emerges in its current form (1983) ===
It was then in 1983 that the club was re-established yet again with Seán O’Sullivan becoming club secretary just as he did 30 years before. Junior Finnegan (later a club president) was appointed coach; Liam McGuire was elected treasurer and Conor O’Mahony as captain. The players who joined up included the Fullers (Mike, John, and Declan), the Sullivans (Kevin, Dee and Ben), Seamus Kelly, Pete O’Sullivan, John Dermody, John O’Connor, Dave Whitby, Dan McSweeney, Mike Sheehan, Ger O’Leary, Mike McGuire and the officers mentioned above. Early results were encouraging and, while the successes of the 1950s did not happen, the club still won the Munster Junior 3 Cup in 1985. Those involved were determined to keep the club going, and indeed many of those mentioned above are still actively involved in the club today.

The club struggled for success in recent times, largely languishing in the bottom half of Division 3 of the Munster Junior League. However, the arrival of Bill Stack as coach in 2008, who forged a strong partnership with then manager Luke O'Sullivan, led to an improvement in the club's fortunes, though not immediately. The division was split in two for the 2008/09 season, and when Killarney lost their first 4 league games it looked like being a disaster. However, they then went on to win 7 games in a row to put themselves into contention for promotion, with their final game away to their great rivals Castleisland, being played under lights at Crageens. Killarney needed to win to move into 2nd place and led 18-14 when the game moved into injury time. A further 13 minutes were played, during which Castleisland scored a breakaway try. A long-range penalty (the last kick of the game) was missed for Killarney and the dream was over. Highlight of that season was undoubtedly the 13–12 win over Shannon in the Munster Junior Plate, with an injury time penalty being the winning score. They also reached the semi-final of the Martin O’Sullivan Cup losing out to Waterford City.

The 2009/10 season saw the club fulfill a long-term ambition in gaining promotion to Division 2 of the Munster Junior League. The effort put in by both players and management paid off in a dramatic season finale, as they won the promotion play-off over Charleville 21–20 with an injury time penalty. Fielding a 2nd XV for the season for the first time was a huge boost for the club and the panel of players has now grown considerably.

=== Pitch development (beginning in 2010) ===
Off the field the club acquired land to become the club's permanent home with plans to build two full size pitches, an all-weather pitch and ancillary facilities. Unfortunately the project had to be shelved as planning couldn't be obtained.

However, during the 2010/11 season the club acquired new property at Aghadoe, 3 km north of the town. Work commenced in 2012 and the club opened the new Aghadoe grounds in September 2016. 2010-11 was a successful year for the club who finished in the top half of Division 2 in their first season, and then went on to win their first major provincial trophy by beating Newport in the Final of the Munster Junior Plate.

=== Killarney's Irish internationals ===
Killarney has three Irish Internationals over the years. Dr. William O’Sullivan became the first Killarney man to represent Ireland at International level when he earned his first cap against Scotland in 1895. The next Killarney man to don the green of Ireland was Jerome Guerin in 1913. Ironically he made his debut against France, the country where he lost his life during the Great War. In 1931, James Egan became the third Killarney man to be capped.

== Committee 2025-26 ==
Killarney RFC executive/management committee as elected as AGM 29-May-2025. All roles fall vacant in May 2026.

President	Mike Walker
Chair	Ger Moynihan
Club Captain	Matt McAuliffe
Treasurer	Aidan O'Connor
Secretary	Gerard Sugrue
PRO	Pierce O'Neill
Mini Rugby Co-ordinator	Dave Hickey
Data Officer	Tony Dunne
Child Welfare	Orla McCarthy
Youth Officer	Steve O'Brien
Women's Rugby Officer	Anne Gabbett
Fundraising/Sponsorship	Anthony Walsh
Facilities	Eamonn Maguire
Transition	John O'Connell
Registrar / Membership	Liam Murphy

== Ground ==
The club currently play their home games at Aghadoe, Killarney. The club moved to this location in August 2015, following 4 years of hard work by the Field Development Committee. Newbridge RFC were the very first opponents for Killarney, on Saturday, 15 August 2015. Aghadoe is some 3 km north of Killarney town and has become the club's permanent home.

== Honours ==
Munster Junior Plate trophy

- Munster Junior Plate Winners

2011, 2013

- Munster Junior League Division 3 Runners-up

2009/10 (Promoted) 2021/22 (Promoted)

- McElligott Cup Winners

2011, 2022

- Galwey-Foley Cup

Winners - 1941, 1954, 1956, 1959^, 2012, 2023
Runners-up - 1969

- McGillycuddy Cup Winners

1954,1956, 2020, 2024

- Munster Junior 3 Cup Winners

1985

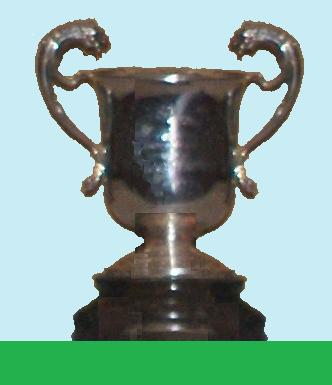
McElligott Cup

- Cork County Cup Runners-up

1957

- Aberavon Shield Winners

1958

- Hayes Cup Winners

1960, 1962

- Guido Erodio Memorial Tournament Winners

2010

^shared with Castleisland

- Martin O'Sullivan Cup

2017, 2019

U16 Munster Development Cup Winners 2019

U16 Girls Munster League Winners 2021

U16 Girls Munster Cup Winners 2021

== List of captains ==
2016-18	Ger Moynihan
2018-19	Peter Kelly
2021-22	Damian Carroll
2022-23	Paudie Sheahan
2023-24	Darren Enright
2024-25	Matt McAuliffe
2025-26	Matt McAuliffe

== List of presidents ==
2018-2025	Luke O'Sullivan
2025-	Mike Walker
