= 2025 Six Nations Women's U20 Summer Series =

- Countries: England; France; Ireland; Italy; Scotland; Wales
- Date: 5–17 July 2025

Official website
- www.sixnationsrugby.com

The 2025 Six Nations Women's U20 Summer Series was the second edition of the Six Nations Women's age-grade rugby union competition.

The competition ran from 5 July to 17 July 2025, all hosted by the Welsh Rugby Union at the Centre for Sporting Excellence in Caerphilly.

== Format ==
Each team plays three matches. A table was used to determine to final results of the competition.

== Table ==
Pos	Team	Pld	W	D	L	PF	PA	PD	TB	LB	Pts
1	France	3	3	0	0	139	56	+83	3	0	15
2	England	3	2	0	1	106	89	+17	3	0	11
3	Ireland	3	2	0	1	101	67	+34	2	0	10
4	Wales	3	1	0	2	93	84	+9	2	1	7
5	Italy	3	1	0	2	53	106	−53	2	0	6
6	Scotland	3	0	0	3	53	143	−90	1	0	1

Source: Rugby Archive

Table ranking rules

- Four points are awarded for a win.
- Two points are awarded for a draw.
- A bonus point is awarded to a team that scores four or more tries, or loses by seven points or fewer.

== Fixtures and results ==
Fixtures were announced in May 2025.

=== Round 1 ===
5 July 2025
13:00 BST (UTC+1)

France	46–5	Italy
Try: Emy Baudru 10' c Zoe Jean 15' m Tifen Lesieu 23' m Elina Folituu (3) 47' c, 52' m, 63' m Anna Macipe 72' m Cherrazade Saiki 80+6' c Con: Anna Macipe (2) 11', 48'; Cherrazade Saiki 80+7'; Cards: Julie Espinosa (yellow card) 58'		Try: Alice Antonazzo 55' m

CCB Centre for Sporting Excellence, Ystrad Mynach

5 July 2025
15:30 BST (UTC+1)

Wales	10–27	Ireland
Try: Savannah Picton-Powell 30' m Seren Singleton 52' m Cards: Freya Bell (yellow card) 15'		Try: Sophie Barrett 20' m Robyn O'Connor 26' m Hannah Clarke 47' m Jemima Adams-Verling 58' c Ellie O'Sullivan-Sexton 80+2' m Con: Caitriona Finn 59'

CCB Centre for Sporting Excellence, Ystrad Mynach

5 July 2025
18:00 BST (UTC+1)

England	31–17	Scotland
Try: Joia Bennett 21' c Grace Clifford 27' m Lucy Simpson 30' m Amelia MacDougall 47' c Molly Luthayi 60' c Con: Lia Green (3) 22', 48', 61'		Try: Holly McIntyre 38' m Emily Norval 56' m Poppy Mellanby 69' c Con: Lucy MacRae 70'; Cards: Nicole Flynn (yellow card) 29'

CCB Centre for Sporting Excellence, Ystrad Mynach

=== Round 2 ===
11 July 2025
13:00 BST (UTC+1)

Italy	20–36	England
Try: Elena Errichiello 2' m Chiara Cheli 28' m Mihaela Pirpiliu 40+1'; Lucie Jeanne Moioli 72' m		Try: Zara Green 41' c Millie David (2) 43' c, 57' m Carmela Morrall 70' c Sophie Hopkins 75' m Lilly Plowman 78' m Con: Ella Cromack (2) 42', 44'; Lia Green 71'; Cards: Carmela Morrall (yellow card) 15'; Keevy Fitzpatrick (yellow card) 27'

CCB Centre for Sporting Excellence, Ystrad Mynach

11 July 2025
15:30 BST (UTC+1)

Ireland	12–41	France
Try: Hannah Clarke 14' c Beth Buttimer 19' m Con: Caitriona Finn 15'; Cards: Sophie Barrett (yellow card) 38'		Try: Justine Ogier (3) 1' m, 47' c, 50' m Cloe Correa 6' m Alice Grandhomme 21' c Pauline Barrat 55' m Kalea Berroyer 71' c Con: Faustine Piscicelli 22'; Pauline Barrat (2) 48', 72'; Cards: Chloe Vauclin (yellow card) 9'

CCB Centre for Sporting Excellence, Ystrad Mynach

11 July 2025
18:00 BST (UTC+1)

Scotland	29–52	Wales
Try: Ceitidh Ainsworth 37' m Freya MacColl (2) 49' c, 66' c Poppy Mellanby 62' c Con: Lucy MacRae (3) 50', 62', 66'; Pen: Lucy MacRae 2'		Try: Mollie Wilkinson 5' c Seren Singleton 10' c Savannah Picton-Powell (2) 17' c, 45' m Branwen Metcalfe 20' c Rosie Carr 42' m Dali Hopkins 70' c Evie Hill 80+1' c Con: Hanna Marshall (4) 6', 11', 18', 21'; Ffion Williams (2) 71', 80+2'; Cards: Sian Jones (yellow card) 53'

CCB Centre for Sporting Excellence, Ystrad Mynach

=== Round 3 ===
17 July 2025
13:00 BST (UTC+1)

Scotland	7–62	Ireland
Try: Freya MacColl 20' c Con: Lucy MacRae 21'; Cards: Louise Taperell (yellow card) 45'; Nicole Flynn (yellow card) 54'		Try: Jane Neill (2) 3' c, 55' c Alma Atagamen 13' c Emily Foley 25' m Sophie Barrett 46' c Tara O'Neill 61' m Robyn O'Connor (2) 64' m, 68' m Aoibhe O'Flynn 75' c Saoirse Crowe 79' c Con: Ellie O'Sullivan-Sexton (4) 3', 14', 47', 56'; Caitriona Finn (2) 76', 80'

CCB Centre for Sporting Excellence, Ystrad Mynach

17 July 2025
15:30 BST (UTC+1)

Wales	24–28	Italy
Try: Molly Wakely 25' m Savannah Picton-Powell 34' c Seren Singleton 48' m Chiara Pearce 64' c Con: Hanna Marshall 35'; Ffion Williams 64'		Try: Elena Errichiello 18' c Chiara Cheli (3) 44' c, 52' c, 74' c Con: Lavinia Pratichetti (4) 19', 45', 53', 75'; Cards: Francesca Andreoli (yellow card) 62'

CCB Centre for Sporting Excellence, Ystrad Mynach

17 July 2025
18:00 BST (UTC+1)

France	52–39	England
Try: Mailys Borak 3' c Faustine Piscicelli (2) 18' c, 62' c Anaick Konyi 25' c Zoe Jean 40+1' m Elina Folituu (2) 46' c, 76' c Julie Espinosa 56' m Con: Pauline Barrat (6) 4', 19', 26', 47', 63', 78'; Cards: Julie Espinosa (yellow card) 32'		Try: Amelia MacDougall 13' c Grace Clifford 31' m Lucie Sams 44' c Lucy Calladine 49' m Sophie McQueen 73' c Zara Green 80+4' m Con: Ella Cromack (3) 14', 44', 74'; Pen: Ella Cromack 21'; Cards: Millie David (yellow card) 68'

CCB Centre for Sporting Excellence, Ystrad Mynach

== See also ==
- 2025 Women's Six Nations Championship
- 2025 Six Nations Under 20s Championship
- 2025 Six Nations Championship
