= Nenagh Ormond =

Irish rugby union club, based in Nenagh, Co.Tipperary

Nenagh Ormond RFC
- Full name: Nenagh Ormond Rugby Football Club
- Union: (Ireland) IRFU
- Branch: Munster
- Founded: 1884; 142 years ago
- Region: Tipperary
- Ground(s): New Ormond Park, Nenagh & Tyone (Capacity: 1000)
- Chairman: Theresa Hassey
- President: John Long
- League: All-Ireland Div. 1A
- 2024–25: 2nd - promoted
Team kit

Official website
- nenaghormondrfc.com

Nenagh Ormond RFC is an Irish rugby union club based in Nenagh, County Tipperary. It was founded in 1884 as the Ormond Cricket and Football Club. The club plays in Division 1A of the All-Ireland League and was County Tipperary's first ever senior grade rugby club. The club's ground is New Ormond Park which has undergone developments including all weather pitch and training areas to replace grass surfaces. The club fields two adult sides and 10 underage sides, including u13 to u20 teams which compete in North Munster and Munster competitions. The club also fields a women's side and girl's underage sides.

The club joined the senior ranks in 2005 when they won the round robin and spent their first ten seasons as a senior club in the bottom division of the All Ireland League. In the 2013/2014 season, the club won Division 2B of the All Ireland League and retained the Munster Senior Plate, which had been won for the first time in December 2012 with a win over Dolphin in Mahon, Cork. In 2014, Nenagh beat Young Munster by 74 points to 7 to win a third competition in the senior ranks.

Nenagh Ormond has produced three Irish full-internationals as well as several players who either played for Munster in the amateur era or played professionally for an Irish province or in England. These include Tony Courtney (1899-1970) with seven caps; Trevor Hogan (formerly Munster and Leinster), who won three caps and made his debut against Japan in 2005; and Donnacha Ryan (Munster), who made his debut in 2008 against Argentina in Croke Park, Dublin. Ray Hogan played professionally with Connacht and David Delaney played professionally with Plymouth.

== Club honours ==
- A.I.L Division 2A - 2024
- A.I.L Division 2B - 2014
- Munster Senior Plate - 2013, 2014
- Limerick Charity Cup - 2017/2018, 2022/2023
- Munster Senior Club of the Year - 2014,2023
- A.I.L. Round-Robin Series - 2005
- Munster Senior Cup: 2025
- Munster Junior Cup (5): 1931, 1935, 1948, 2000 & 2004
- Munster Junior League Division 1 - 2005
- Munster Junior League Division 2 - 1999
- Munster Junior Clubs Challenge Cup - 2000, 2003
- Manseragh Cup 1931, 2004, 2025
- Garryowen Cup 1931, 2000
- Gleeson League 2000
- O'Carroll Cup 2000
- Evans Cup 1997
- u20/21 O Connor Cup 2008, 2009, 2012, 2013, 2014
- u20 Munster division 2 league 2009
- u18 All Ireland League 2000
- u18 Munster League 2000
- u18 East Munster League 2009
- u18 East Munster Cup 2008
- u16 East Munster League
- u16 East Munster Cup
- u14 East Munster League
- u14 East Munster Cup 1996
