= Kinsale RFC =

Irish rugby union club, based in Kinsale, Co.Cork

(Ireland) Kinsale RFC
- Full name: Kinsale Rugby Football Club
- Union: Rugby Union
- Nickname: K R F C
- Founded: 1982; 44 years ago
- Region: Cork
- Ground(s): Snugmore, Kinsale, County Cork (Capacity: 7500)
Team kit

Official website
- kinsalerfc.com

Kinsale RFC is a rugby union team located in the town of Kinsale, County Cork, Ireland - approximately 18 miles (29 km) from Cork City. Founded in 1982, the club's first team was competing in Division 2 of the Munster Junior League since 2010. In the 2013/14 season, Kinsale RFC achieved promotion to Division 1 of the Munster Junior League, for the first time in its history, after finishing second in Division 2. They were relegated the following year and did not return to Division 1 until the 2025/26 season, when they once again secured promotion. Kinsale also fields various other teams including Ladies, Veterans, and have underage teams from U-8 up to U-18. Kinsale RFC is also home to Europe's largest Rugby Sevens event, The Heineken Kinsale Sevens, which is held at its Snugmore grounds every May.

== Kinsale Sevens ==
Kinsale RFC hosts the annual Kinsale Sevens rugby tournament. This tournament (also known as Heineken Kinsale Sevens, Kinsale Sevens By The Sea) is one Ireland and Europe's premier seven-a-side club rugby events. It traditionally takes place across the May Bank Holiday Weekend and draws teams from around the world compete against each other in ladies, men's (junior and senior) and veteran competitions.

== Honours ==
- Munster Junior Clubs Challenge Shield (1): 2026
- O'Neill Cup (3): 2017, 2019, 2022
- Munster Junior League Div3 (1): 2001
- Tait Cup (2): 1983, 1987
- McCarthy Cup (3): 1984, 1985, 1986
- Kelly Cup (4): 1986, 1989, 1992, 1996

== Notable former players ==
- Darragh Hurley
- Scott Buckley
