= France women's national under-21 rugby union team =

France's national women's under-21 rugby union team

France U-21 Women
- Union: French Rugby Federation
- Emblem: Cockerel
- Ground: Various

The France women's national under-21 rugby union team, formally France women's national under-20 rugby union team represents France in women's age-grade international rugby union at under-21 level. The team is governed by the French Rugby Federation (FFR). From 2026, the team competes in the Six Nations Women's U21 Series, (Note: Each squad can include up to five players aged up to 23) having previously competed as an under-20 side in the Six Nations Women's U20 Summer Series.

France's women's under-20 team has been the dominant force in women's age-grade U20 competition having not lost an under-20 match since 2018.

== History ==
In the years prior to the formation of the Six Nations Women's U20 Summer Series, France played regularly against England U20 in friendly matches.

The Six Nations Women's U20 Summer Series was established in 2024, with the inaugural edition held at Stadio Sergio Lanfranchi in Parma, Italy. France won all three of their matches. They won against Wales, Scotland, and England to win the title undefeated.

In 2025, France retained the title with a clean sweep of victories at the Centre for Sporting Excellence in Ystrad Mynach, Wales, defeating Italy 46–5, Ireland 41–12 and England 52–39 to win the competition for the second consecutive year.

== Results ==
=== Results summary ===
The following table shows France's U20 and U21 record against each opponent.

Correct as of 18 April 2026

Opponent	First game	Played	Won	Drawn	Lost	Win %
Basque Country	2016	2	2	0	0	100%
Belgium (Senior)	2015	1	1	0	0	100%
England U20/21	2010	26	23	1	2	88.46%
Ireland U20/21	2025	1	1	0	0	100%
Italy U20/21	2025	1	1	0	0	100%
Scotland U20/21	2024	1	1	0	0	100%
Wales U20/21	2024	2	2	0	0	100%

==== Overall record ====
Correct as of 18 April 2025

Played	Won	Drawn	Lost	Win %
34	31	1	2	91.18%

== Honours ==
Six Nations Women's U21 Series

Champions (2): 2024, 2025
