= Ballincollig RFC =

Rugby club in County Cork, Ireland

(Ireland) Ballincollig RFC
- Full name: Ballincollig Rugby Football Club
- Union: IRFU
- Branch: Munster
- Founded: 1978; 48 years ago
- Ground(s): Tanner Park, Ballincollig, County Cork
Team kit

Ballincollig RFC is a rugby union club based in the town of Ballincollig, in County Cork. The club was founded in 1978, and home games have been played at Tanner Park since the 1993 season.

The club has a Munster Junior League team, South Munster Junior 2 team and also a Junior 3 team, as well as Under 20, Under 18, Under 16, and Under 14 teams. Ballincollig RFC also supports a thriving mini rugby set-up. The club has a second senior team, with the founding of the ladies' team back in 1995, who won the AIL Division 2 title in 2006 .

== History ==
Towards the end of the 1977/78 rugby season a group of 7 or 8 rugby enthusiasts had the idea of starting a rugby club in Ballincollig. They considered that in Ballincollig, a growing town with a population of approximately 10000 people, there would be a sufficient number of rugby players to form a good team. The formation of a club would also be an amenity for large numbers of children who would be growing up there. The enthusiasts were all from Ballincollig but played for different clubs.

After a few meetings the club organised a match against Highfield in March 1978. The team consisted of mainly Highfield, Cork Con., and Dolphin players. The remainder of the team consisted of beginner rugby players and soccer players. All do an unusual team, Ballincollig won by 18-10.Games followed against Cork Con., Dolphin and Sundays well. The result of these matches were sufficiently good for the organisers to call a public meeting to launch the club and to register it with the Munster Branch of the Irish Rugby Football Union.

=== Crest ===
The crest depicts a boar with a backdrop of the club's colours: black and white separated with a red line. The three crowns adorning the boar represent the olden Kings of Munster from long ago.

=== Pitch and dressing rooms ===
At this stage the problem of a pitch and dressing rooms had to be tackled. The officers approached John A. Woods Social Club. The Social Club agreed to let them use their G.A.A. pitch and dressing rooms. A G.A.A. pitch is about 137 metres long, which is about 40 metres longer than what a rugby pitch should be, so the club had the longest rugby pitch in Cork and the lowest crossbar in Rugby history, but they managed and were grateful. During that season the club played very well, but did not win any trophies.

== Playing Record ==
=== Season 1978/79 ===
In the 1978/79 season the club entered competition at Minor B level. They played well in the league but failed to reach the semi-final. In the Minor B Cup they were beaten in the third round by Old Christians. During that season they played quite a few friendly matches against Junior teams. The results of these were quite promising. Aaron O'Flynn (@AareonBahh) | Twitter

=== Season 1979/80 ===
The players decided to move up two grades to Junior level because of the good results achieved in Junior friendlies the season before. A second team was formed that year also to facilitate the increasing numbers of players who were joining the club. That year the club went on its first trip to Amsterdam. The Hague Rugby Club thought the team arriving was ‘Ballin College’, a long established college rugby team. They included five international players in their team. Suffice to say that the result of the game has never been made known outside the touring party!

=== Season 1980/81 ===
The club again played at Junior level that season; the 2nd team played at Minor A level. That season moves were made to form a Juvenile section in the club. The club made a second trip to Amsterdam and this time there was no mistake in the club’s identity.

=== Season 1981/82 ===
At an extraordinary general meeting that year the club decided to drop its first team back down to Minor A. This automatically pushed the second team back to Minor B level, which was much more suitable for them. At that general meeting also, the club was one of the few in Ireland to pass a motion against the proposed Irish tour of South Africa. That year the first team reached the semi-final of the Minor A Cup but were beaten by Cork Con, 16-13. Also in that season, Ballincollig seriously got involved in under age rugby. Trained by Jack Quaid, the Under 18 team won the West Cork Cup. They beat Bandon 12-3 in the final.

=== Season 1982/83 ===
This season was a disastrous one for Ballincollig RFC in many ways. At the beginning of the season, John A. Woods Social Club informed the club that they couldn’t use the pitch and dressing rooms anymore because they needed these facilities for their own members. The first few games of the season were played either in Highfield or at Murphy’s Farm in Bishopstown. Negotiations with Cork Co. Council allowed the club to lease the grounds at Innishmore where the present pitches are. Mr. Dan Murray agreed to rent dressing rooms and training facilities to the club at Ballincollig Community School.

In November 1982, the Vice-Captain of the first team, Denis Quaid, suffered a brain haemorrhage while playing against Kanturk on the pitch at Innishmore. He was rushed to hospital but all in vain for Denis never recovered. He died a few days later. He was 30 years old and his wife Mary was expecting their first baby. The baby boy, called Denis, was born the following April.

=== Season 1983/84 ===
At the start of the season Mary Quaid donated a commemorative cup in memory of Denis and asked for a competition to be held in memory of him. The club decided on a one-day festival in September. Sixteen clubs were invited, fourteen clubs were represented. After a magnificent day of rugby, Muskerry emerged victorious. They were the first holders of the Denis Quaid Trophy. In November the club held their most successful tour to date when they travelled to Plymouth with a strong team where they won one and lost one match. Also in that season the first team reached the semi-final of the minor A league, where they were beaten 6-3 by Kanturk. In the minor A Cup they reached the final but were beaten by Highfield 13-12.

=== Season 1984/85 ===
The highlight of this season was Ballincollig winning the Denis Quaid Trophy. That year twelve clubs were represented. The first team again reached the semi-final of the Minor A league. They were beaten by Dunmanway, 14-9. They were beaten in the first round of the Minor A Cup. The second fifteen reached the semi-final of the B Cup but lost to Kinsale 6-3. In March 1985, the club ended its association with the West End Bar where all the weekly meetings and post match discussions had been held since the founding of the club. The West End changed hands at this time. The club was delighted to accept the offer of the Shanahan family to use Oriel House as their base. Oriel House also provided the club with dressing room facilities.

=== Season 1985/86 ===
The Denis Quaid Trophy was now firmly established as a prestigious competition. The competition this season was won by Dunmanway. Ballincollig won the White Horse Plate, which was a secondary competition during the Denis Quaid Festival. That season, the club held an under 12 competition as well. This was attended by ten teams. The teams were aiming to win a cup presented Tom Power. Presentation College were the winners.

=== Season 1986/87 ===
1986/87 had a poor start when the captain, Michael Moloney, following a road accident, had to stand down as captain. Phil Rees, the vice-captain decided to retire and Colin Glavin was eventually elected captain.

Mary Quaid became the first female officer of the club when she was elected Secretary. Mary Stratford became the first female member of the general committee. Douglas won the White Horse Plate. The competition for the Denis Quaid Trophy maintained its high standard and status. The 2nd XV reached the final of the McCarthy Cup, the real breakthrough.

=== Season 1987/88 ===
Beginning this season the nomenclature of rugby team grades in the South Munster Branch was changed. These changes were made to bring it into line with the other branches. The Ballincollig 1st XV or Minor A changed to Junior II and the Minor B team became Junior III. The 1st XV (JuniorII) team played well in the league but did not qualify for the final stages. Neither 1st nor 2nd teams got very far. Midleton won the Denis Quaid cup.
