= England women's national under-21 rugby union team =

England's national women's under-21 rugby union team

England U-21 Women
- Union: Rugby Football Union
- Emblem: Red Rose
- Ground: Various
- Coach: LJ Lewis

The England women's national under-21 rugby union team represents England in women's age-grade international rugby union at under-21 level. The team is governed by the Rugby Football Union (RFU) and forms part of the England Women's Performance Pathway, which bridges the gap between domestic club rugby and the senior England women's national rugby union team.

The team was formerly known as the England women's national under-20 rugby union team. From the 2026 season, following a restructuring by Six Nations Rugby, the programme was elevated to under-21 level. (Note: Each squad can include up to five players aged up to 23) This change accompanied the replacement of the Six Nations Women's U20 Summer Series with the new Six Nations Women's U21 Series.

== Players ==
=== Current squad ===
In February 2026, head coach LJ Lewis named a 34-playerdevelopment ahead of the 2026 Six Nations Women's U21 Series.

== Coaching staff ==
LJ Lewis was appointed head coach in July 2023. Sarah McKenna, Women's Six Nations Championship Grand Slam winner, was appointed assistant coach ahead of the 2023–24 season and has continued in the role following the transition to Under-21 level.

== Results ==
=== Results summary ===
The following table shows England's U20 and U21 record against each opponent.

Correct as of 18 April 2026

Opponent	First game	Played	Won	Drawn	Lost	Win %
British Police	2005	1	1	0	0	100%
British Army	2015	6	6	0	0	100%
Canada U20/21	2008	13	10	0	3	76.92%
France U20/21	2010	27	2	1	24	7.40%
Ireland U20/21	2024	1	1	0	0	100%
Italy U20/21	2025	1	1	0	0	100%
Scotland U20/21	2011	5	5	0	0	100%
South Africa (Senior)	2021	2	0	0	2	0%
South Africa U20	2011	3	2	0	1	66.67%
Spain XV	2026	1	1	0	0	100%
United States U20	2009	8	6	0	2	75%
Wales U20/21	2008	9	9	0	0	100%

==== Overall record ====
Correct as of 18 April 2026

Played	Won	Drawn	Lost	Win %
77	44	1	32	57.14%

== Honours ==
- Women's U20 Nations Cup champions

Winners (3) 2008, 2009, 2011
Third place (1): 2013

- U20 Women's Tri-Nations

Winners (2): 2018, 2019

Six Nations Women's U21 Series

Runners-up (1): 2025
Third place (1): 2024
