= CCB Centre for Sporting Excellence =

Welsh sports facility

Coordinates: 51.6347°N 3.2366°W

Centre for Sporting Excellence
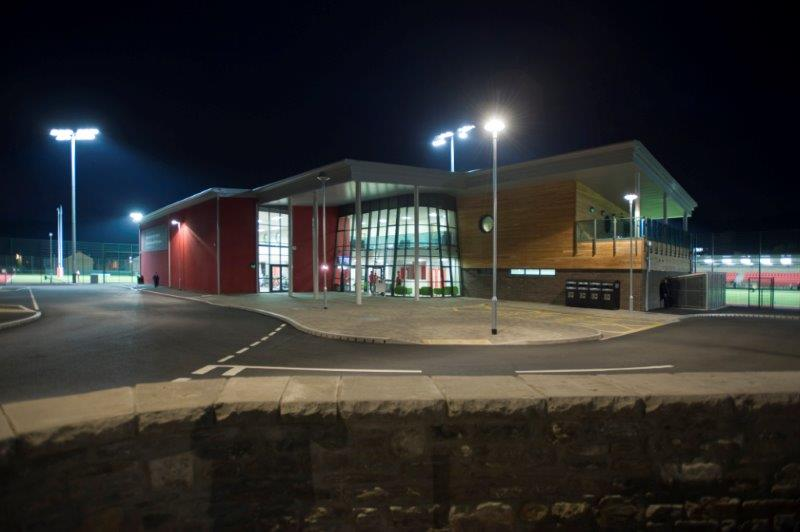
- Main Building front entrance
- Interactive map of Centre for Sporting Excellence
- Location: Caerphilly Road, Ystrad Mynach, Caerphilly CF82 7EP, Wales
- Owner: Caerphilly County Borough Council
- Capacity: 1000 (500 x 2 grandstands)

Construction
- Opened: 21 May 2014
- Builder: Heron Bros Ltd

Tenant
- Cardiff City Ladies

The CCB Centre for Sporting Excellence (Welsh: Canolfan Rhagoriaeth Chwaraeon Brwrdeistaf Sirol Caerffili) was opened in May 2014. The CCB Centre for Sporting Excellence in Ystrad Mynach, Caerphilly, Wales, is a sports facility located in and run by Caerphilly County Borough Council, South Wales. The Centre's facilities include a FIFA 2 star 3G Football Pitch, an IRB 22 ratified 3G Rugby Pitch, 2 conference rooms, a strength and conditioning room, medical & first aid rooms, a community room, 2 grandstands; 1 on each pitch and 2 balconies overlooking both pitches for performance analysis purposes.

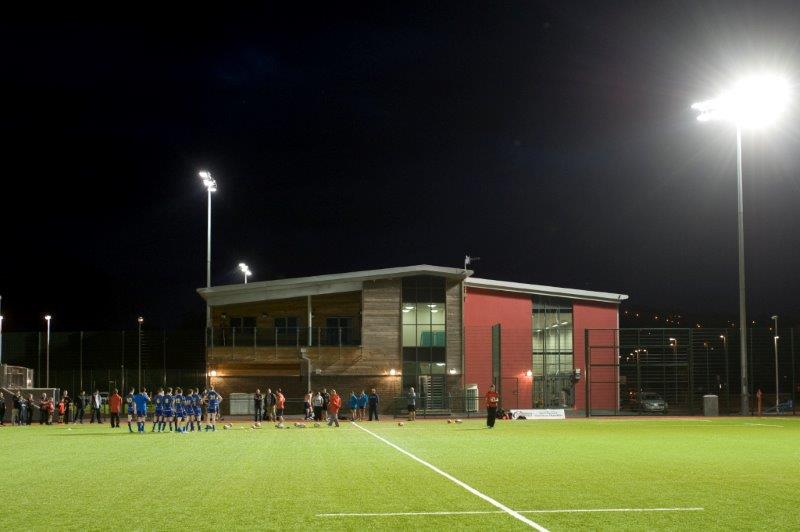
CCB Centre for Sporting Excellence Night 2

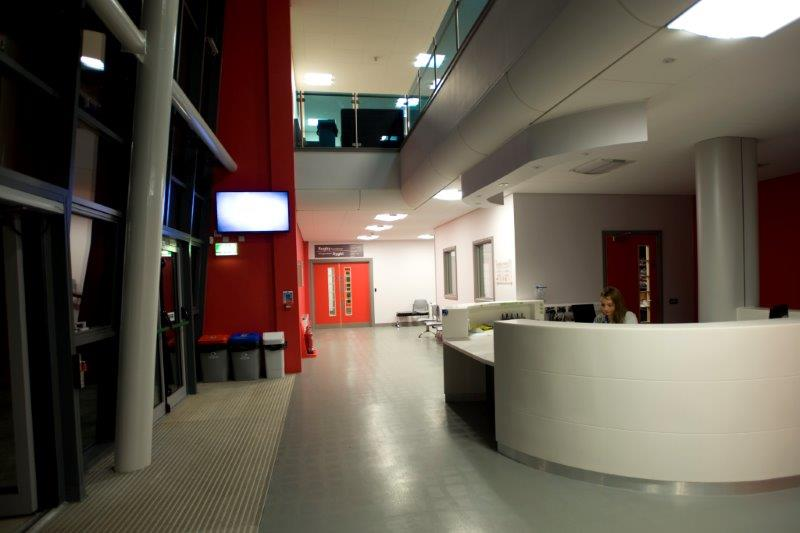
Centre for Sporting Excellence reception area

Both grandstands have seating for 500 spectators. The office space on the 1st floor hosts the Newport Gwent Dragons coaching & management staff and some regional Welsh Rugby Union staff are also based at the centre.

The Newport Gwent Dragons use the facility as a training base, along with local educational establishment Coleg y Cymoedd.

The Centre was opened with the help and support of the Welsh Rugby Union, Welsh Football Trust, Sport Wales & Welsh Government funding. The principal contractor who built the site was Heron Bros Ltd of Northern Ireland.

== Facilities ==
- FIFA 2 star 3G football pitch with grandstand (500 seats)
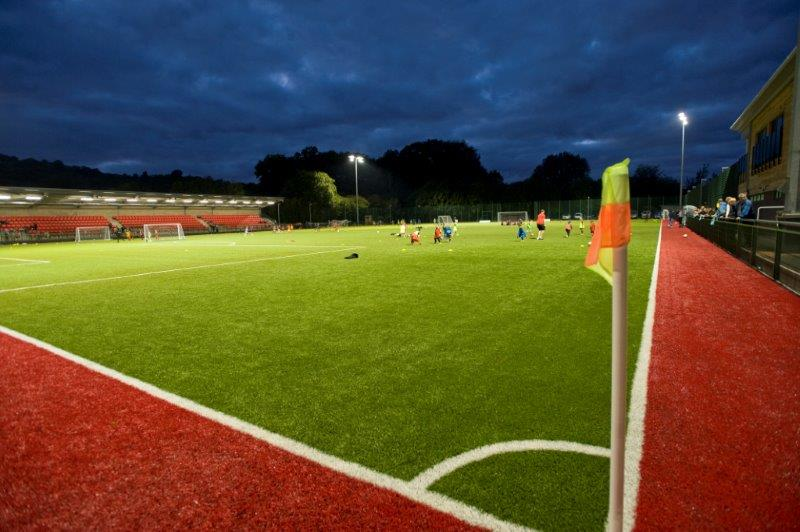
  CCB Centre for Sporting Excellence Football Pitch
- IRB 3G Rugby pitch with grandstand (500 seats)
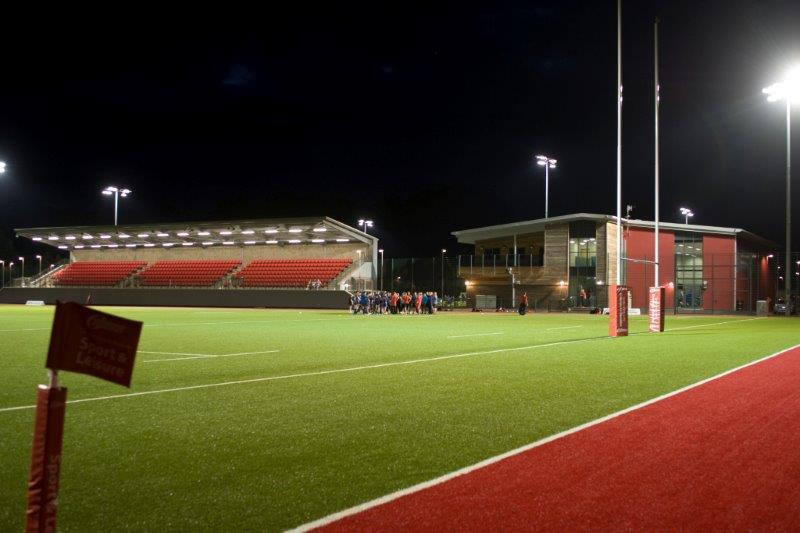
  CCB Centre for Sporting Excellence Rugby Pitch
- Strength and conditioning room
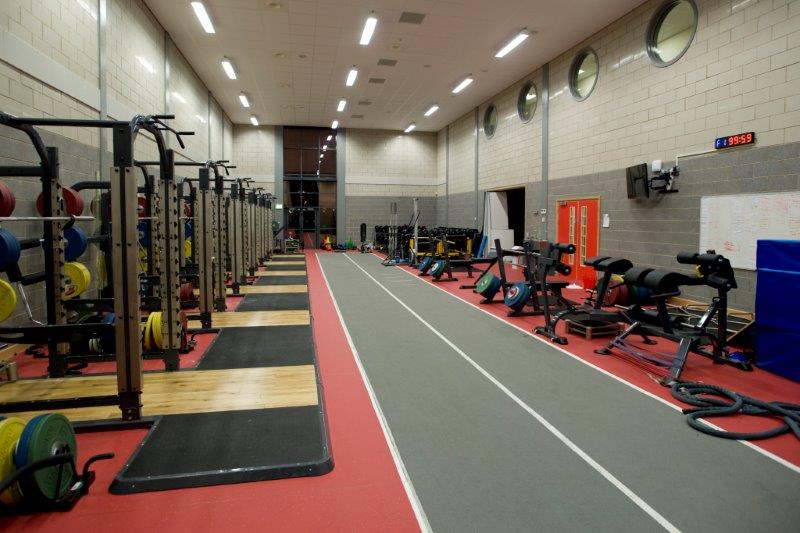
  Centre for Sporting Excellence Strength & Conditioning room
- "Aaron Ramsey" conference suite
- "Ryan Jones" conference suite
- Community meeting room
- Rugby and football changing rooms with officials changing facilities
- Newport Gwent Dragons/Welsh Rugby Union staff offices
- Parking for around 75 cars

== Past and present users ==
- Newport Gwent Dragons
- Newport Gwent Dragons Academy
- Welsh Rugby Union Age Grade Rugby
- Penallta RFC
- Cross Keys RFC
- Senghenydd RFC
- Caerphilly RFC
- South Wales Scorpions RLFC
- Welsh Rugby Union Ladies
- Coleg Gwent
- Carmarthen Town FC
- Cardiff City F.C. Academy
- Welsh Veterans Football
- Football Association of Wales Learning Disability National Squad;
- Llanyrafon Ladies FC
- Risca United F.C.
- Risca United Academy
- Caerphilly Schools Football
- Caerphilly Castle Ladies & Girls FC
- Cascade F.C.
- Nelson Cavaliers F.C.
- Treharris FC Under 11s
- Bedwas RFC
- Aberbargoed Buds F.C.
- Urdd Gobaith Cymru
- Coleg Y Cymoedd
- Coed Duon Dragons F.C.
- Blaenau Gwent Women RFC
- Westfields F.C.
- Pontllanfraith RFC
- Senghenydd Ladies RFC
- Newbridge RFC Under 12s
- Ynysddu RFC Mini & Junior teams
- Rhymney Valley Schools Rugby Union
- Soccersixes
- Cardiff City Ladies FC
