= McCarthy Island =

McCarthy Island may refer to:

- McCarthy Island (Kemp Land)
- McCarthy Island (South Georgia)

== See also ==
- MacCarthy Island
