= Kinsale (barony) =

Barony in County Cork, Ireland

Kinsale Cionn tSáile (Irish)
- Barony
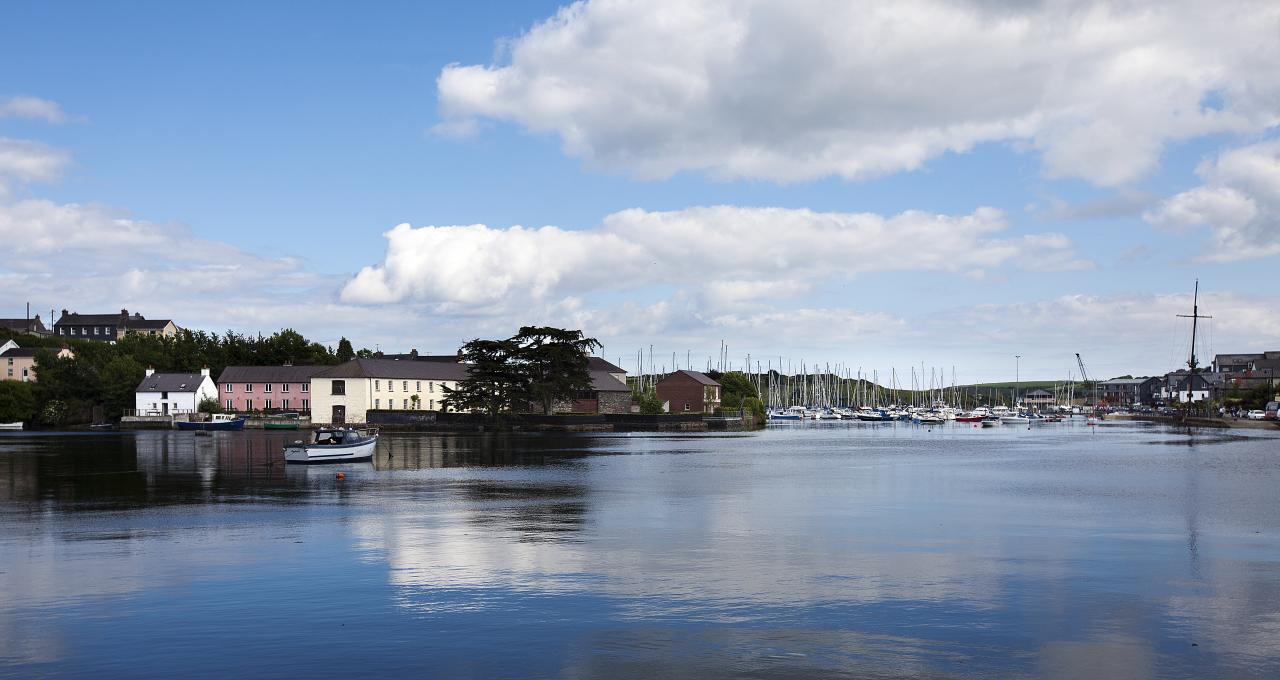
- Kinsale harbour

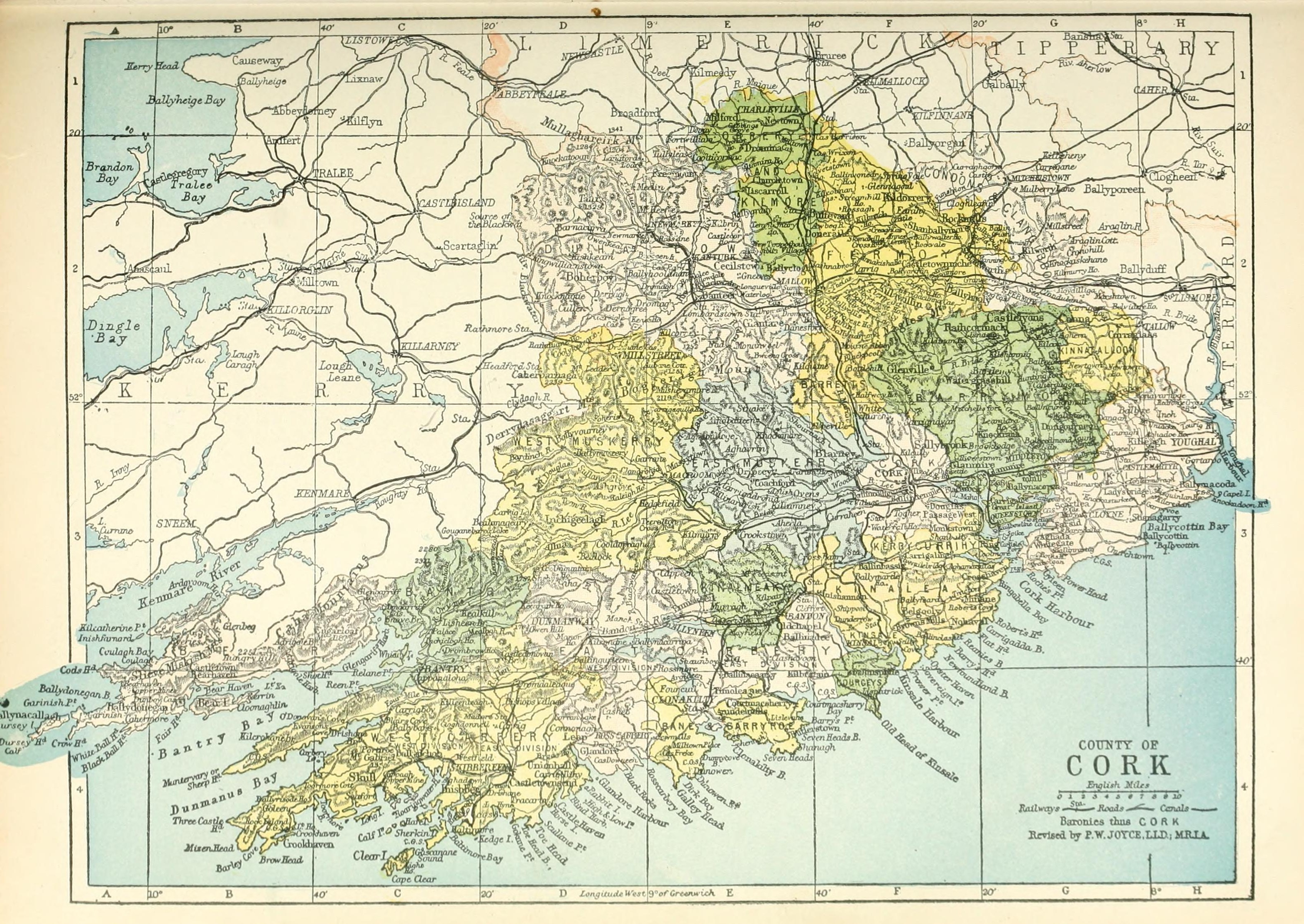
- Barony map of County Cork, 1900; Kinsale barony is in the south, coloured yellow.

- Location within County Cork
- Coordinates: 51°43′N 8°31′W
- Sovereign state: Ireland
- Province: Munster
- County: Cork

Area
  - Total: 50.3 km^{2} (19.4 sq mi)

Kinsale (Irish: Cionn tSáile) is a historical barony in south County Cork, Ireland.

Baronies were mainly cadastral rather than administrative units. They acquired modest local taxation and spending functions in the 19th century before being superseded by the Local Government (Ireland) Act 1898.

== History and legend ==
Kinsale barony was originally O'Kearney territory; by the 13th century the De Courcys had it.

== Geography ==
Kinsale is in the south of the county, a coastal region containing the town of Kinsale and the lower reaches of the River Bandon.

== List of settlements ==
Settlements within the historical barony of Kinsale include:

- Belgooly
- Dunderrow
- Kinsale

== See also ==
- List of townlands of the barony of Kinsale
