= Summer Cove =

Coordinates: 51.698736°N 8.499641°W

A map of Summer Cove

Summer Cove is part of Kinsale town on the Kinsale harbour, on the south coast of Ireland; it faces westwards across the entrance of the harbour to the Castlepark peninsula. Charles's Fort is located on the southern edge Summercove, at the water's edge. The Bulman pub, located at the centre of Summercove, is one of Ireland's best-known bars, having won Black and White Pub of the Year in 2002 and 2004. It is one of Kinsale's most affluent areas and attracts many tourists for its high-quality views of Kinsale town and surrounding lands.
