= Timothy McCarthy (sailor) =

Royal Navy sailor (1888–1917)

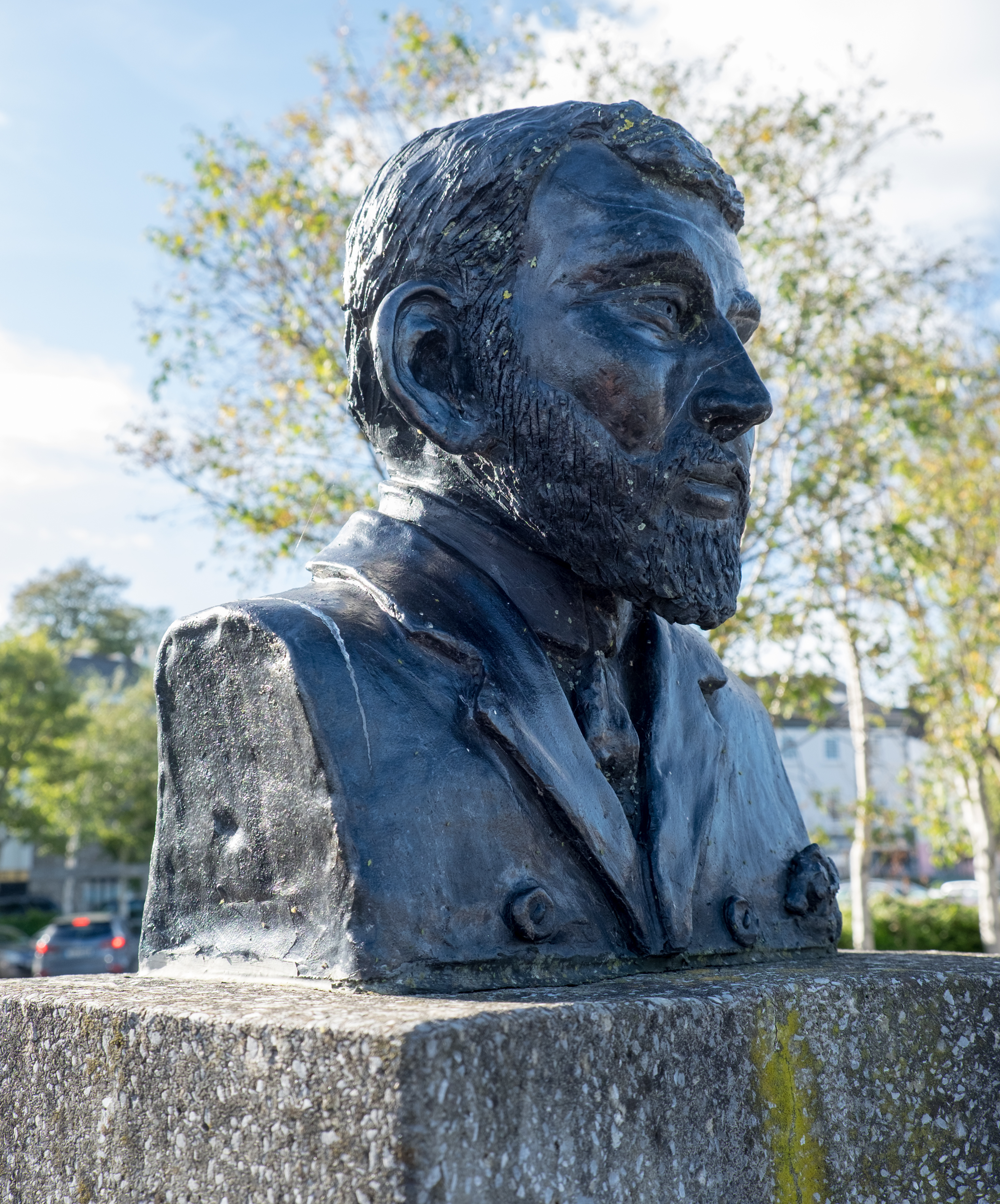
- Timothy on the 2000 Timothy and Mortimer McCarthy memorial by Graham Brett in Kinsale
- Born: 15 July 1888; Kinsale, County Cork, Ireland
- Died: 16 March 1917 (aged 28); Western Approaches
- Military career
- Allegiance: United Kingdom
- Branch: (United Kingdom) Royal Navy
- Rank: Leading seaman
- Awards: Polar Medal

Timothy McCarthy (15 July 1888 – 16 March 1917) was an Irish leading seaman (LB). He is best known for his service in the Imperial Trans-Antarctic Expedition of 1914–1916, for which he was awarded the Bronze Polar Medal.

== Biography ==
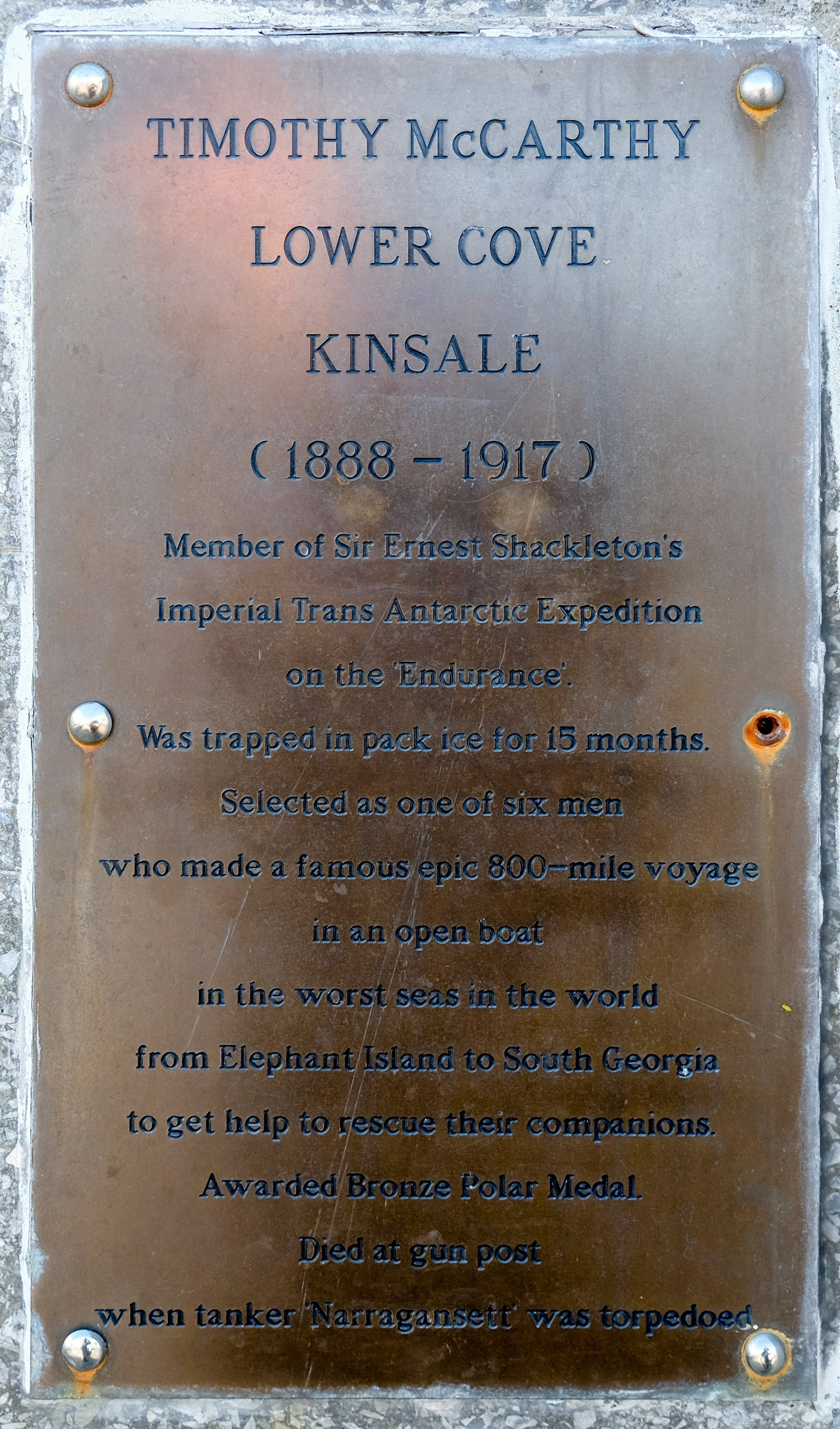
Plaque on the quay-side memorial in Kinsale

McCarthy was born on 15 July 1888 in Kinsale, County Cork. He signed on the Endurance as an able seaman, and participated fully in the dangers and privations of the Weddell Sea, particularly after the Endurance sank and the ship's company and shore party were marooned on a nearby ice floe. Later, the ship's company and shore party were forced to take to lifeboats, and the seamanship of the ABs became a decisive element in the survival of the entire company.

Expedition commander Ernest Shackleton was impressed by McCarthy's skill during the survival journey from the northern Weddell Sea to Elephant Island, and so when the expedition leader decided to relaunch the best lifeboat into the open Southern Ocean, with the goal of contacting potential rescuers in South Georgia, McCarthy was one of the five men he chose to accompany him. The sixteen-day voyage of the James Caird in April–May 1916 became a classic story of human endurance, and the boat's navigator, Frank Worsley, offered fervent and repeated praise to McCarthy for his services in keeping the boat afloat and helping to ensure the survival of the party.

When the James Caird, in a sinking condition, made landfall on South Georgia's uncharted southern coast, two of the six men of the company were physically unfit for further service. Shackleton and his men turned over the boat and made it into a primitive shore shelter, which they called Peggotty Camp. Three of the men—Tom Crean, Worsley, and Shackleton himself—crossed the icy island to finalise the rescue, while the other three, the ageing carpenter Henry McNish and incapacitated seaman John Vincent, briefly remained at the camp under McCarthy's informal leadership. The island crossing was successful and the party was reunited after less than forty-eight hours. Soon McCarthy found himself heading northward. Having successfully participated in his own rescue, his part in the expedition was over.

Upon making landfall in the British Isles, McCarthy (who opposed the Irish nationalist Home Rule movement and identified himself with the British Empire) found his country fighting World War I. He joined the Royal Naval Reserve as a leading seaman. In these duties he was assigned to man a deck gun on the S.S. Narragansett, an oil tanker. On 16 March 1917, this vessel was torpedoed and sunk with all hands in the Western Approaches. McCarthy, aged 28, was the first member of the Weddell Sea party of the Imperial Trans-Antarctic Expedition to die.

== Legacy ==
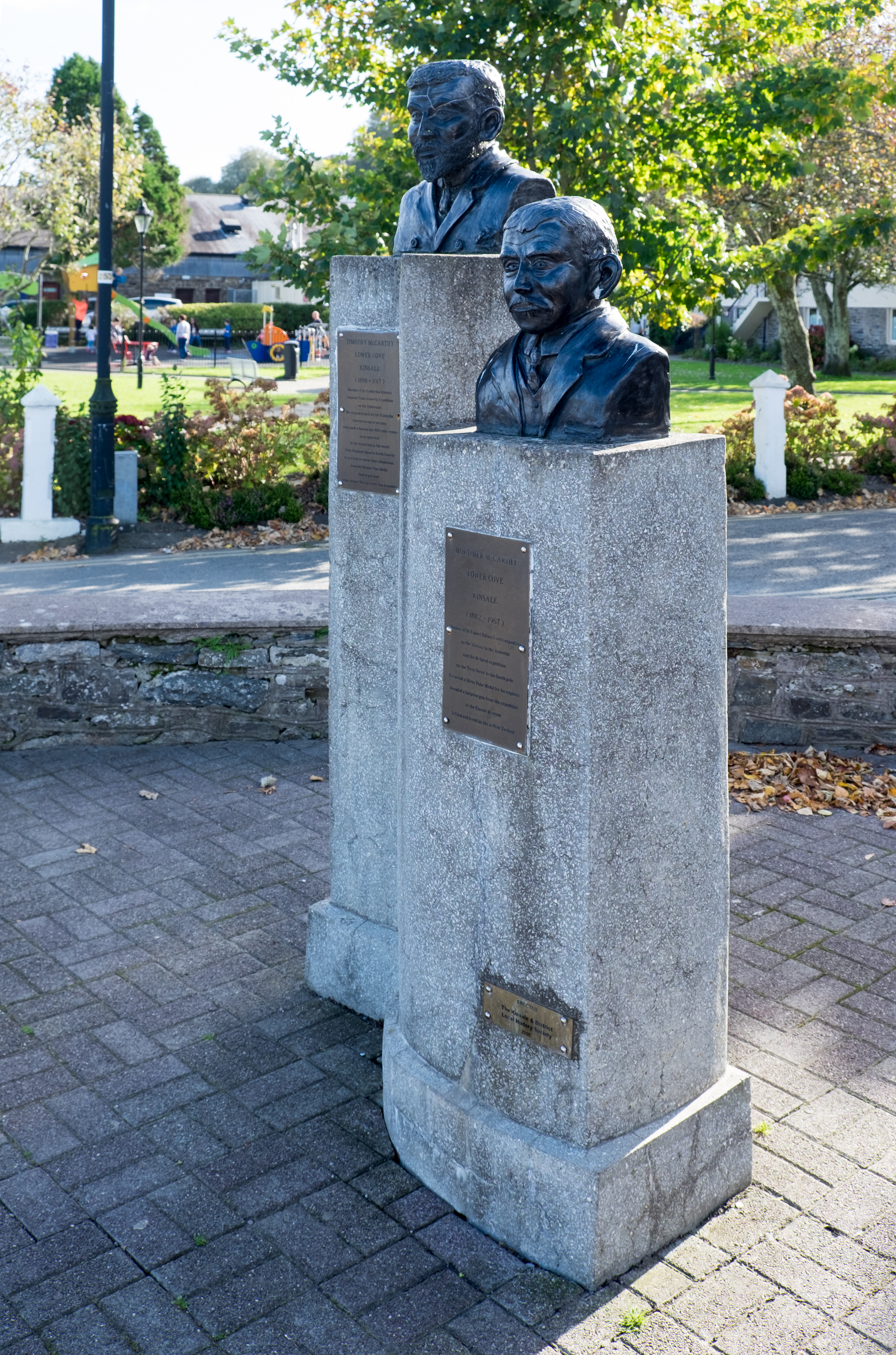
The McCarthy brothers' memorial in Kinsale

In 1916–17, McCarthy was awarded the Polar Medal in bronze. McCarthy Island, a rocky island just off King Haakon Bay where the James Caird made landfall, was named in McCarthy's honour by the South Georgia Survey in the period 1951–1957. A joint bust of Tim McCarthy and his brother Morty, also an Antarctic explorer, was unveiled in Kinsale in September 2000.
