= James's Fort =

James Fort
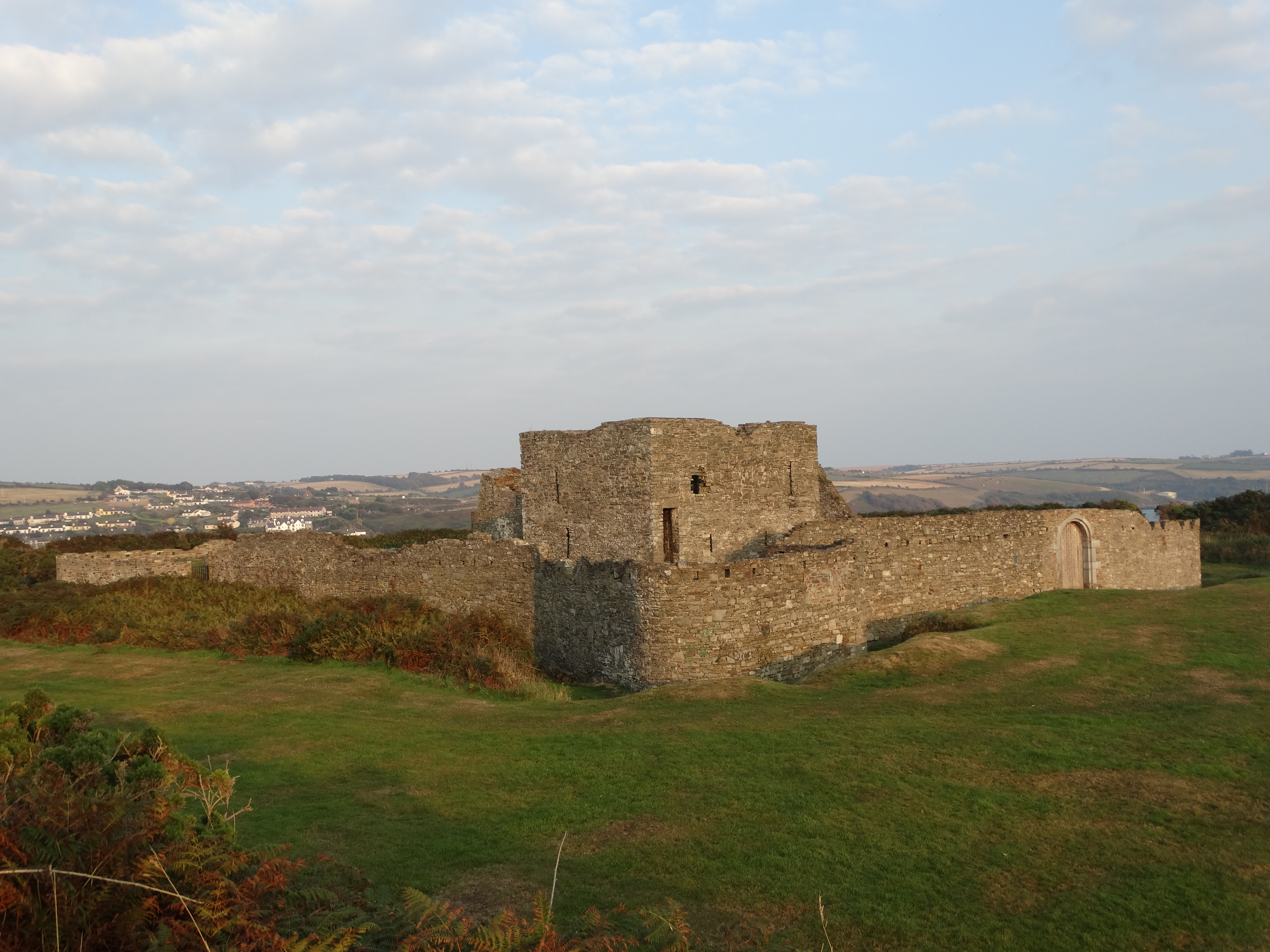
- Central fortification of James Fort

- Location of James Fort in Kinsale harbour
- 51.6986°N 8.5122°W
- Type: Bastion fort
- Location: Castlepark peninsula, Kinsale harbour, County Cork, Ireland

History
- Built: 1602

Site notes
- Governing body: Office of Public Works

National monument of Ireland
- Type: Guardianship
- Reference no.: 525
- Description: Star-shaped-fort & blockhouse

James Fort (Irish: Dún Rí Shéamuis) is an early 17th-century pentagonal bastion fort located on Castlepark peninsula in Kinsale harbour, County Cork, Ireland. Situated downstream from Kinsale on the River Bandon, the fort was built to defend the harbour and seaborne approaches of the town. Following the construction of Charles Fort on the opposite side of the harbour in the late 17th century, James Fort became known as the "old fort" (Irish: an Seandaingean). Listed as a protected National Monument, and managed by the Office of Public Works, the fort is open to visitors.

== History ==
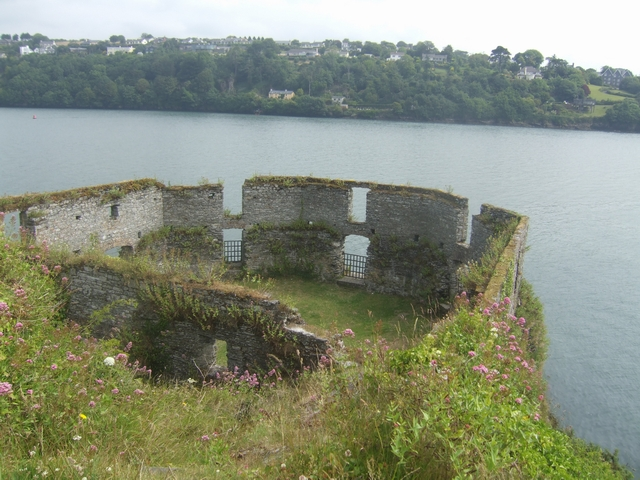
The waterfront blockhouse

Before James Fort was constructed, an earlier medieval fortification existed on the site. This fortification, named Castle Ny-Parke was occupied for a time by Spanish forces as part of the 4th Spanish Armada. During the early part of the Siege of Kinsale (1601), it was captured from the Spanish by Sir Richard Smyth who led the attacking English forces of Charles Blount, Lord Mountjoy.

Construction of James Fort commenced in 1602 - immediately after the Siege of Kinsale. The fort was named after James I of England and VI of Scotland, and was built to designs by Paul Ive (to replace and supplement the older medieval structure). Completed by 1607, the central structure was a half-bastioned four-sided stone fortification, surrounded by pentagonal earthworks to a bastion fort or star-shaped fort design. A hexagonal blockhouse was built on the water's edge – a water battery at the narrowest point in the channel.

As with Charles Fort on the other side of the harbour, James Fort was occupied by Jacobite forces during the Williamite War in Ireland. It was captured however in 1690 by Williamite forces, after being damaged by an explosion of gunpowder stores.

Though Charles Fort (the "new fort") was operated as a military garrison through to the early 20th century, James Fort (the "old fort") declined in use during the 18th century, and texts and maps describe it as a ruin by the 19th century.

== Today ==
James Fort was subject to a number of archaeological excavations in the late 20th and early 21st centuries - including a survey commissioned by Dúchas (the Heritage Service) in 1998. The fort site is listed as a National Monument (number 525), and as such under "state guardianship". As of 2016, An Taisce (the National Trust for Ireland) listed the fort in an "at risk" category, noting that while it had been subject to preservation works, it required "a long-term conservation management plan to prevent future deterioration".

The James Fort site is publicly accessible, and visited both as a tourist attraction and as an amenity park (by walkers and runners).
