= Mortimer McCarthy =

Polar explorer

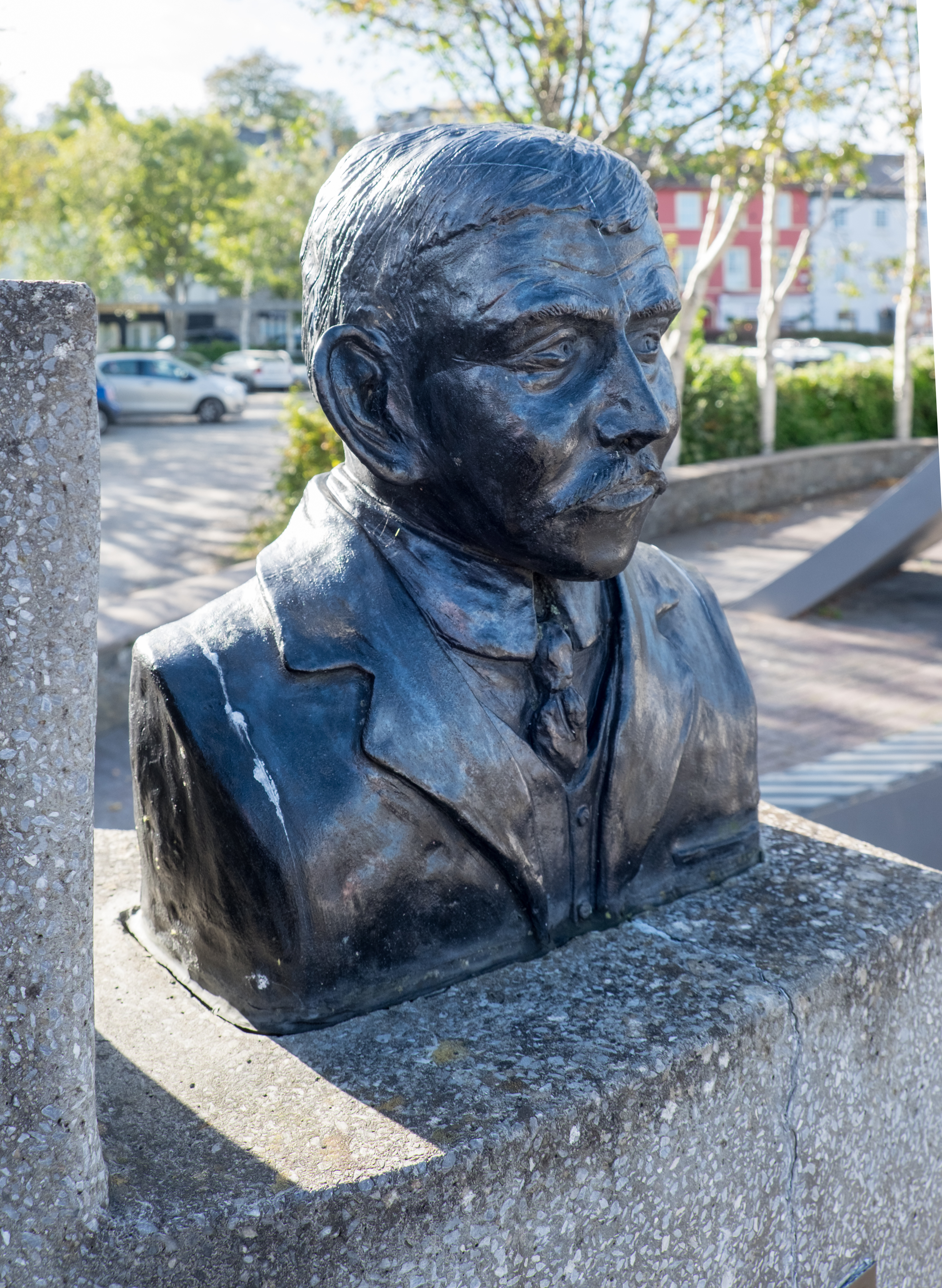
- Mortimer on the 2000 Timothy and Mortimer McCarthy memorial by Graham Brett in Kinsale
- Born: 15 April 1882; Kinsale
- Died: 11 August 1967 (aged 85); New Zealand
- Monuments: Mount McCarthy; Bust of him erected in Kinsale
- Occupation: Sailor
- Known for: Polar exploration
- Spouse: Ellen Coughlan
- Children: 3
- Awards: Polar Medal (argent)

Mortimer McCarthy (15 April 1882 – 11 August 1967) was an Irish sailor and polar explorer.

== Early life ==
McCarthy was born in Kinsale, County Cork, Ireland on 15 April 1882. He was brought up in Lower Cove, a small settlement on the east side of the mouth of the River Bandon, about 4 km (2.5 miles) south-east of Kinsale. He started his career as a mariner at the age of 12, when he joined the Royal Navy (Note: All of Ireland was part of the United Kingdom at this time.) as a boy seaman. He received the South Africa war medal for serving during the Second Boer War. McCarthy left the navy and moved to New Zealand in 1907, where he became a merchant seaman.

== Polar exploration ==
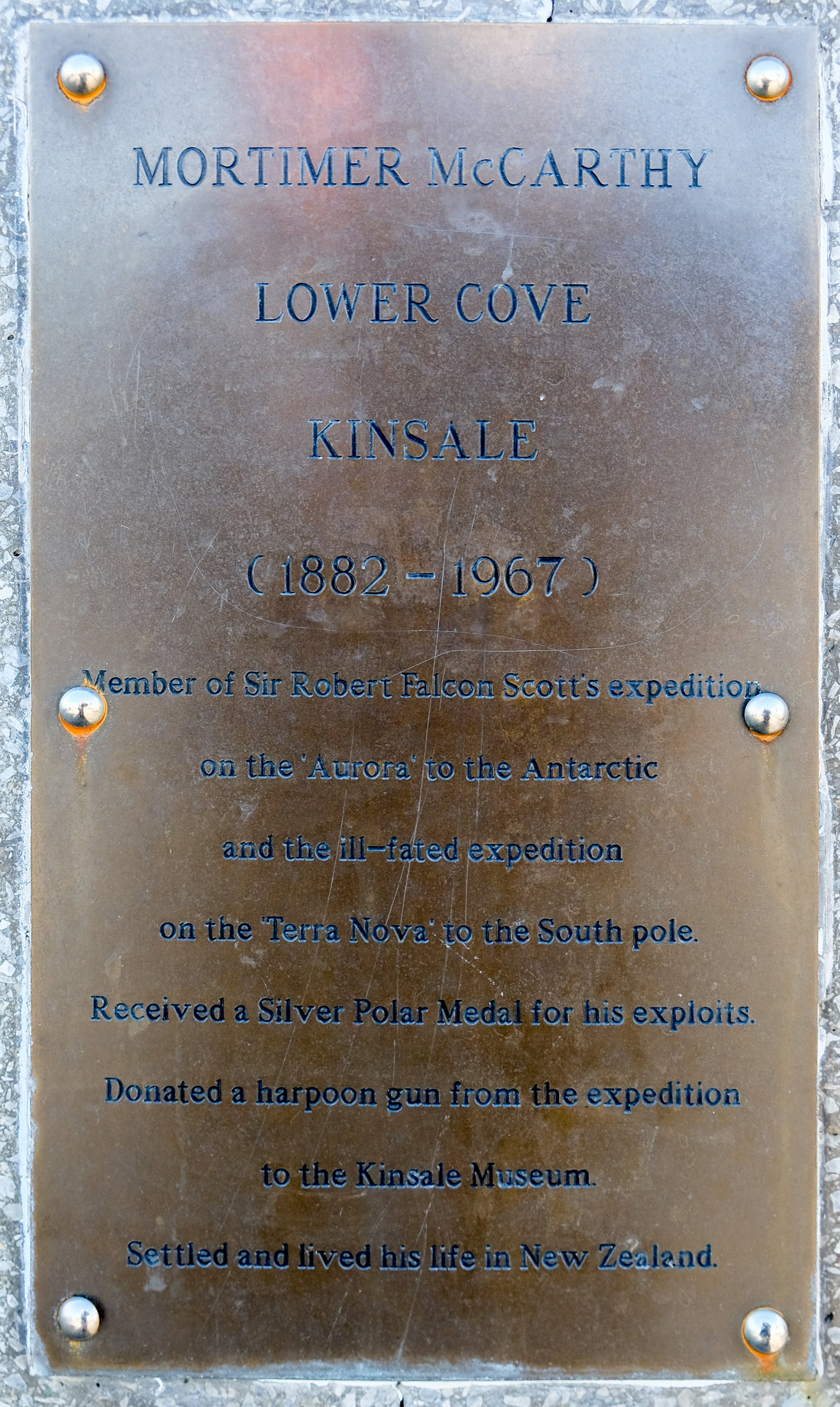
Plaque on the key-side memorial in Kinsale

In 1910, McCarthy volunteered to join the British Antarctic Expedition under Captain Robert Falcon Scott. With Scott, he made three Antarctic voyages. He served on the crew on Scott's failed 1912-13 Terra Nova Expedition which attempted to reach the South Pole. For his service with this expedition he received the Silver Polar Medal from King George V at a Buckingham Palace investiture. After failing in his attempt to get a place on another Antarctic expedition, on Endurance with Sir Ernest Shackleton for the Imperial Trans-Antarctic Expedition, he joined the Northern Exploration Company in Tromsø in Northern Norway which gave him the opportunity to work in the Arctic.

== First World War ==
McCarthy rejoined the Royal Navy to serve on destroyers during the First World War. He settled again in Lyttelton, New Zealand in 1920.

== Later life ==
In 1963, at 81 years old, as one of the last three living survivors of Scott's Antarctic expedition, he accepted an invitation from the American Antarctic Survey to visit the Antarctic once more. On the trip he became the oldest person to ever visit the South Pole. He died in New Zealand in 1967 aged 85.

== Family ==
He had three sons with his wife Ellen Coughlan who he married in 1923 and who was also from Kinsale.

== Memorials ==
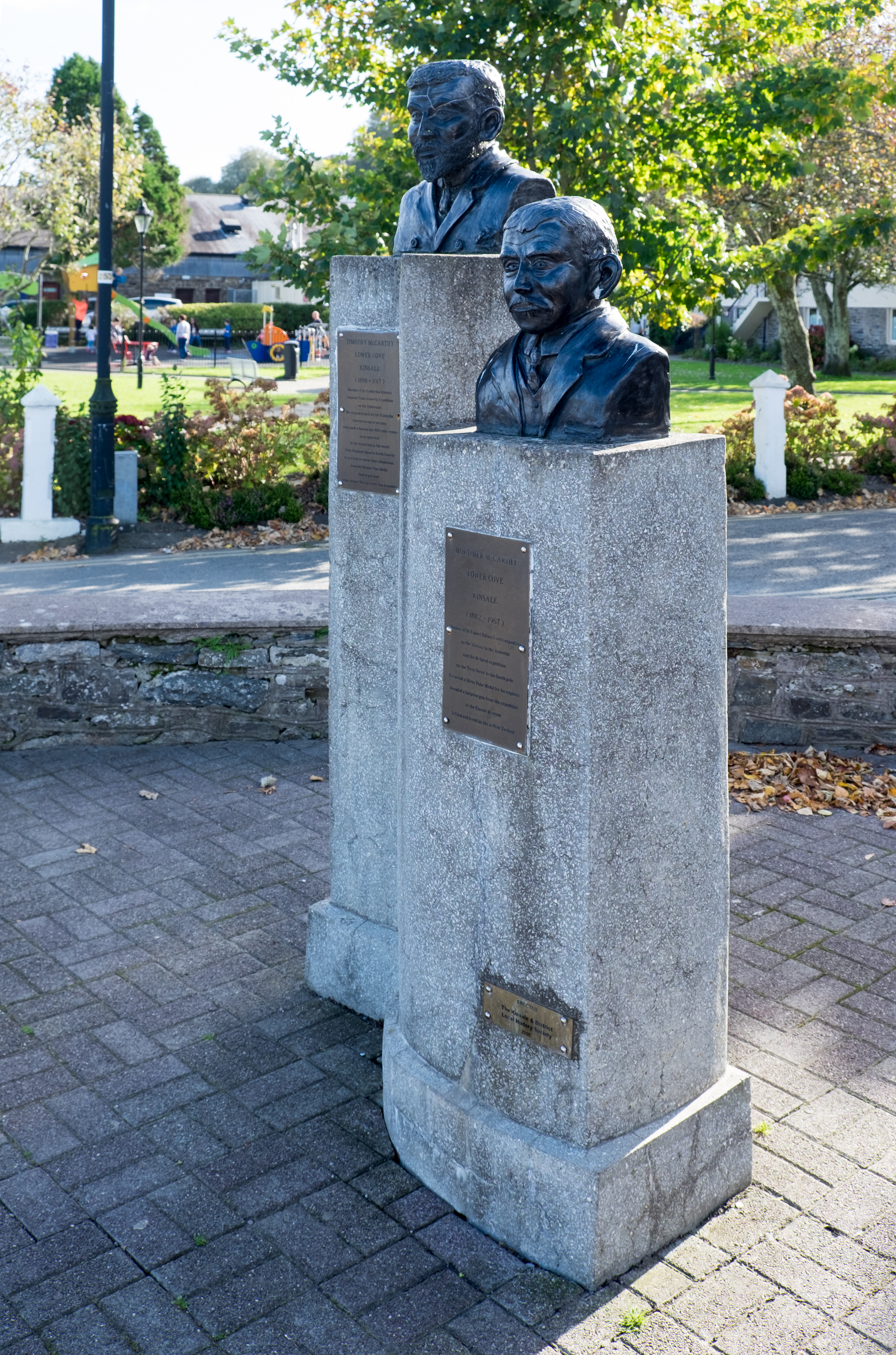
The McCarthy brothers' memorial in Kinsale

Mount McCarthy in Antarctica is named after him. McCarthy's brother, Tim, was also a sailor and polar explorer, and in September 2000 joint statues of the two of them were unveiled in their home town of Kinsale.
