= List of townlands of the barony of Kinsale =

This is a sortable table of the townlands in the barony of Kinsale, County Cork, Ireland. Duplicate names occur where there is more than one townland with the same name in the barony, and also where a townland is known by two alternative names. Names marked in bold typeface are towns and villages, and the word Town appears for those entries in the area column.

== Townland list ==
Townland	Area (acres)	Barony	Civil parish	Poor law union
Abbey-lands (in 5 pts.)	106	Kinsale	Ringcurran	Kinsale
Abbey-lands	20	Kinsale	Kinsale	Kinsale
Acres	85	Kinsale	Ringrone	Kinsale
Ardbrack	203	Kinsale	Ringcurran	Kinsale
Ardcloyne	157	Kinsale	Tisaxon	Kinsale
Ardkilly	245	Kinsale	Ringrone	Kinsale
Allstar	110	Kinsale	Clontead	Kinsale
Ballinacurra	314	Kinsale	Clontead	Kinsale
Ballinrichard	179	Kinsale	Clontead	Kinsale
Ballinroe East	45	Kinsale	Ringrone	Kinsale
Ballinvard	132	Kinsale	Clontead	Kinsale
Ballymacaw	200	Kinsale	Ringrone	Kinsale
Ballymacus	252	Kinsale	Ringcurran	Kinsale
Ballynabooly	227	Kinsale	Kilroan	Kinsale
Ballynacubby	35	Kinsale	Kinsale	Kinsale
Ballynacubby	39	Kinsale	Ringcurran	Kinsale
Ballynamona	273	Kinsale	Dunderrow	Kinsale
Ballynidon	182	Kinsale	Ringrone	Kinsale
Ballythomas	88	Kinsale	Clontead	Kinsale
Ballythomas East	135	Kinsale	Dunderrow	Kinsale
Ballythomas West	106	Kinsale	Dunderrow	Kinsale
Ballyvrin Lower	60	Kinsale	Dunderrow	Kinsale
Ballywilliam	348	Kinsale	Tisaxon	Kinsale
Barrackgreen	3	Kinsale	Kinsale	Kinsale
Bawnavota	233	Kinsale	Ringcurran	Kinsale
Blackhorsefield	15	Kinsale	Kinsale	Kinsale
**Brownsmills**	Town	Kinsale	Ringcurran	Kinsale
Brownsmills	2	Kinsale	Ringcurran	Kinsale
Butlerstown	78	Kinsale	Clontead	Kinsale
Camphill	16	Kinsale	Clontead	Kinsale
Cappagh	322	Kinsale	Ringcurran	Kinsale
Castlelands	23	Kinsale	Ringrone	Kinsale
Castlepark	415	Kinsale	Ringrone	Kinsale
Clashmore	74	Kinsale	Clontead	Kinsale
Clonleigh	159	Kinsale	Ringcurran	Kinsale
Commoge	42	Kinsale	Kinsale	Kinsale
Commons	1	Kinsale	Ringcurran	Kinsale
Coolcarron	435	Kinsale	Ballymartle	Kinsale
Coolvallanane Beg	173	Kinsale	Clontead	Kinsale
**Cove**	Town	Kinsale	Ringcurran	Kinsale
Dromderrig	136	Kinsale	Kinsale	Kinsale
Dunderrow	227	Kinsale	Dunderrow	Kinsale
Farranamoy	94	Kinsale	Clontead	Kinsale
Farranarouga North	23	Kinsale	Ringcurran	Kinsale
Farranarouga South	9	Kinsale	Ringcurran	Kinsale
Farranatouke	35	Kinsale	Ringcurran	Kinsale
Farrangalway	211	Kinsale	Ringcurran	Kinsale
Forthill	77	Kinsale	Ringcurran	Kinsale
Garraha	143	Kinsale	Ringcurran	Kinsale
Glanbeg	21	Kinsale	Ringcurran	Kinsale
Glasheen	20	Kinsale	Clontead	Kinsale
Gortnalicky	17	Kinsale	Clontead	Kinsale
Gortnalusheen	57	Kinsale	Clontead	Kinsale
Hollyhill	388	Kinsale	Tisaxon	Kinsale
Kilcawha	135	Kinsale	Ringcurran	Kinsale
Killany	230	Kinsale	Dunderrow	Kinsale
**Kinsale**	Town	Kinsale	Kinsale	Kinsale
**Kinsale**	Town	Kinsale	Ringcurran	Kinsale
Knockduff	271	Kinsale	Ringcurran	Kinsale
Knocknabohilly	17	Kinsale	Ringcurran	Kinsale
Knocknacurra	11	Kinsale	Kinsale	Kinsale
Knocknahilan	136	Kinsale	Clontead	Kinsale
Knocknapogaree	139	Kinsale	Ringcurran	Kinsale
Knockrobin	192	Kinsale	Clontead	Kinsale
Lackenacummeen	286	Kinsale	Clontead	Kinsale
Lackenagea	52	Kinsale	Clontead	Kinsale
Liscahane Beg	87	Kinsale	Clontead	Kinsale
Liscahane More	61	Kinsale	Clontead	Kinsale
Lisnacrilla	169	Kinsale	Clontead	Kinsale
Mansfield's-land	71	Kinsale	Ringcurran	Kinsale
Mansfield's-land	9	Kinsale	Kinsale	Kinsale
Mellifontstown	282	Kinsale	Ringcurran	Kinsale
Mellifontstown	323	Kinsale	Dunderrow	Kinsale
Mitchelstown East	250	Kinsale	Clontead	Kinsale
Mitchelstown West	172	Kinsale	Clontead	Kinsale
Monaclarig	41	Kinsale	Clontead	Kinsale
Mullendunny	74	Kinsale	Clontead	Kinsale
Old-fort	33	Kinsale	Ringrone	Kinsale
Parklaurence	20	Kinsale	Clontead	Kinsale
Preghane	546	Kinsale	Ringcurran	Kinsale
Rath Beg	39	Kinsale	Ringcurran	Kinsale
Rathmore	336	Kinsale	Ringcurran	Kinsale
Rathmore	47	Kinsale	Kinsale	Kinsale
Rathvallikeen	18	Kinsale	Ringcurran	Kinsale
Ringfinnan	120	Kinsale	Ringrone	Kinsale
Ringrone	160	Kinsale	Ringrone	Kinsale
**Sandy Cove**	Town	Kinsale	Kilroan	Kinsale
**Sandy Cove**	Town	Kinsale	Ringrone	Kinsale
Sandy Cove Island	18	Kinsale	Kilroan	Kinsale
Scart	120	Kinsale	Clontead	Kinsale
Scilly	6	Kinsale	Ringcurran	Kinsale
Screhaneroe	73	Kinsale	Clontead	Kinsale
Sleveen	18	Kinsale	Ringcurran	Kinsale
Sovereign Islands	2	Kinsale	Ringcurran	Kinsale
Spital-land	47	Kinsale	Ringcurran	Kinsale
Tisaxon Beg	128	Kinsale	Tisaxon	Kinsale
Tisaxon More	313	Kinsale	Tisaxon	Kinsale
Townplots	54	Kinsale	Kinsale	Kinsale
Troopers-close	9	Kinsale	Ringcurran	Kinsale
Waters-land North	196	Kinsale	Ringcurran	Kinsale
Waters-land South	71	Kinsale	Ringcurran	Kinsale
Wintsmills	11	Kinsale	Tisaxon	Kinsale
