= Charles Fort (Ireland) =

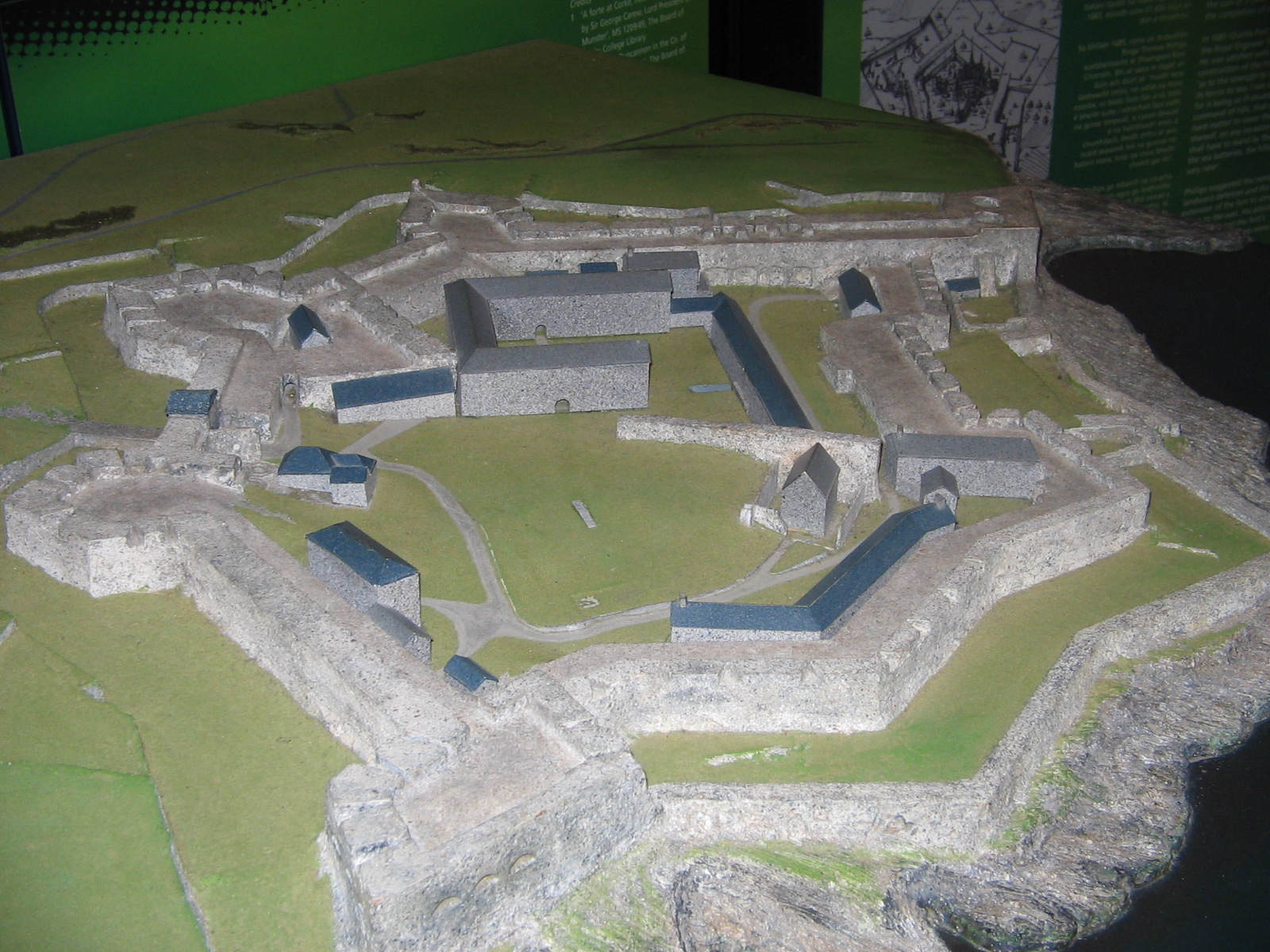
- Plan of fort showing layout

- Location relative to Kinsale
- Type: Bastion fort
- Location: Kinsale harbour, County Cork, Ireland
- Coordinates: 51.6965°N 8.4990°W
- Built: 1670s
- Governing body: Office of Public Works

National monument of Ireland
- Type: Guardianship
- Reference no.: 535
- Description: Star-shaped fort

Charles Fort (Irish: Dún Chathail) is a trace italienne fortification, a bastion fort with one section of the outer wall built in star fashion. It is located at the southern end of the village of Summer Cove, on Kinsale harbour, County Cork, Ireland. First completed in 1682, Charles Fort was sometimes historically referred to as the "new fort", to contrast with James' Fort (the "old fort") which had been built on the other side of Kinsale harbour before 1607. The fort is now operated as a heritage tourism site by the Heritage Ireland arm of the Office of Public Works.

== History ==
Charles Fort was built on the site of the ruins of an earlier stronghold known as Barry Óg Castle, at Rincurran. The Ringcurran defences had featured prominently during the Siege of Kinsale in 1601.

The new fort, which is named after Charles II, was designed by the Surveyor-general Sir William Robinson – architect of the Royal Hospital Kilmainham. Additional site structures are attributed to engineer Captain Thomas Philips. The fort was built between 1677 and 1682 to a design which included elements similar to star fortifications; a layout specifically designed to resist attack by cannon. It became known as the "new fort" – to contrast with James' Fort (the "old fort") which had been built on the other side of Kinsale harbour between 1602 and 1607.

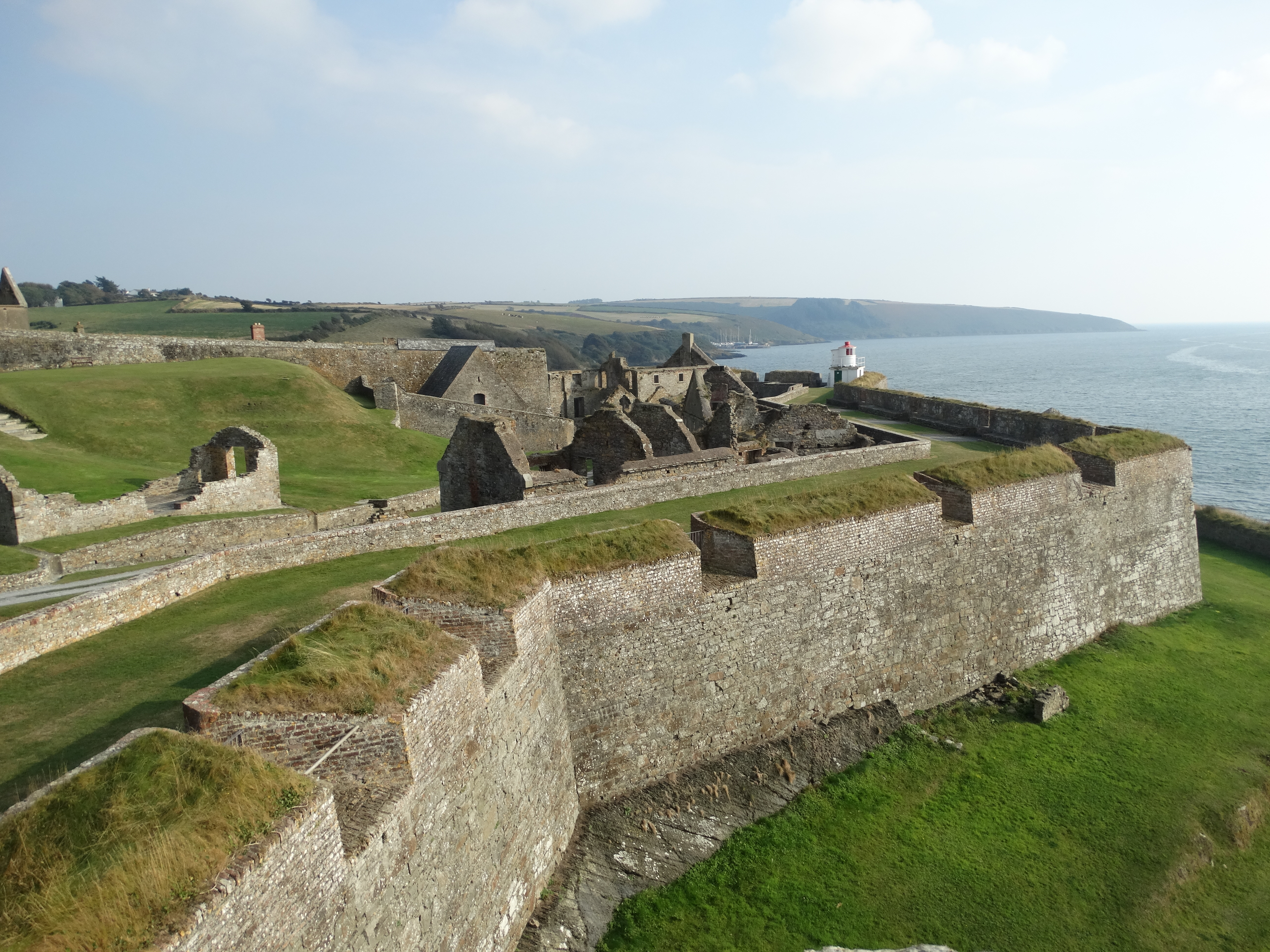
Seaward embrasures and lighthouse of Charles Fort

An early lighthouse was established here in the 17th century by Robert Reading, and additional works (including the development of internal "citadel" defences) were added through the 18th and 19th centuries.

The fort remained in use as a British Army barracks for two hundred years afterwards, before being relinquished by British forces following the Anglo-Irish Treaty of 1921. The fort fell out of use after being burned by retreating anti-Treaty forces during the Irish Civil War in 1922.

== Architecture ==
Charles Fort is an example of a pentagonally bastioned fort. The five bastions are named, in turn, the "Kinsale" (also known as the "Devil's"), the "Charles", the "Cockpit", the "Flagstaff" and the "North". The "Kinsale" and the "Charles" – the seaward bastions – are more substantial than the other three, as it was expected that the fort would be attacked from sea.

With a focus on seaward defence, the landward and inland bastions of the fort are overlooked by higher ground. This weakness was of critical importance when the fort was subject to a 13-day siege in 1690 during the Williamite War in Ireland. John Churchill, 1st Duke of Marlborough (then 1st Earl) besieged Cork and captured Kinsale and its forts. Repairs were made following the siege.

== Tourism development ==
The complex remained largely derelict for some time, but was named a National Monument of Ireland in 1971. Over the coming decades several sections of the fort were restored by Dúchas, the Irish heritage service. Restoration and development of the complex was later taken-over by the Office of Public Works (OPW), including the development of an exhibition space in the former commander's quarters.

Charles Fort is one of the most visited OPW sites in the region, attracting in excess of 86,000 visitors in 2015.

== Gallery ==
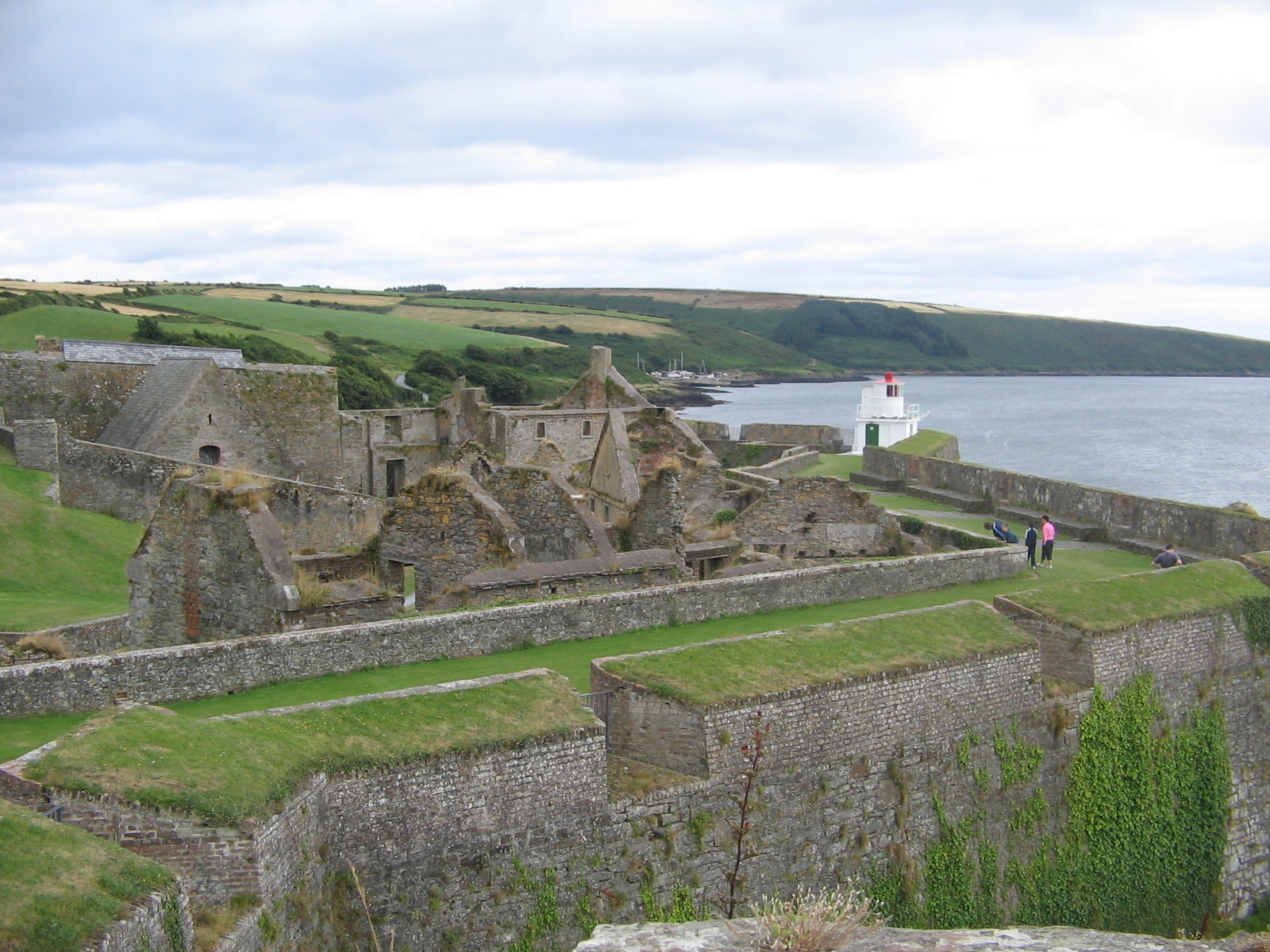
Fortifications

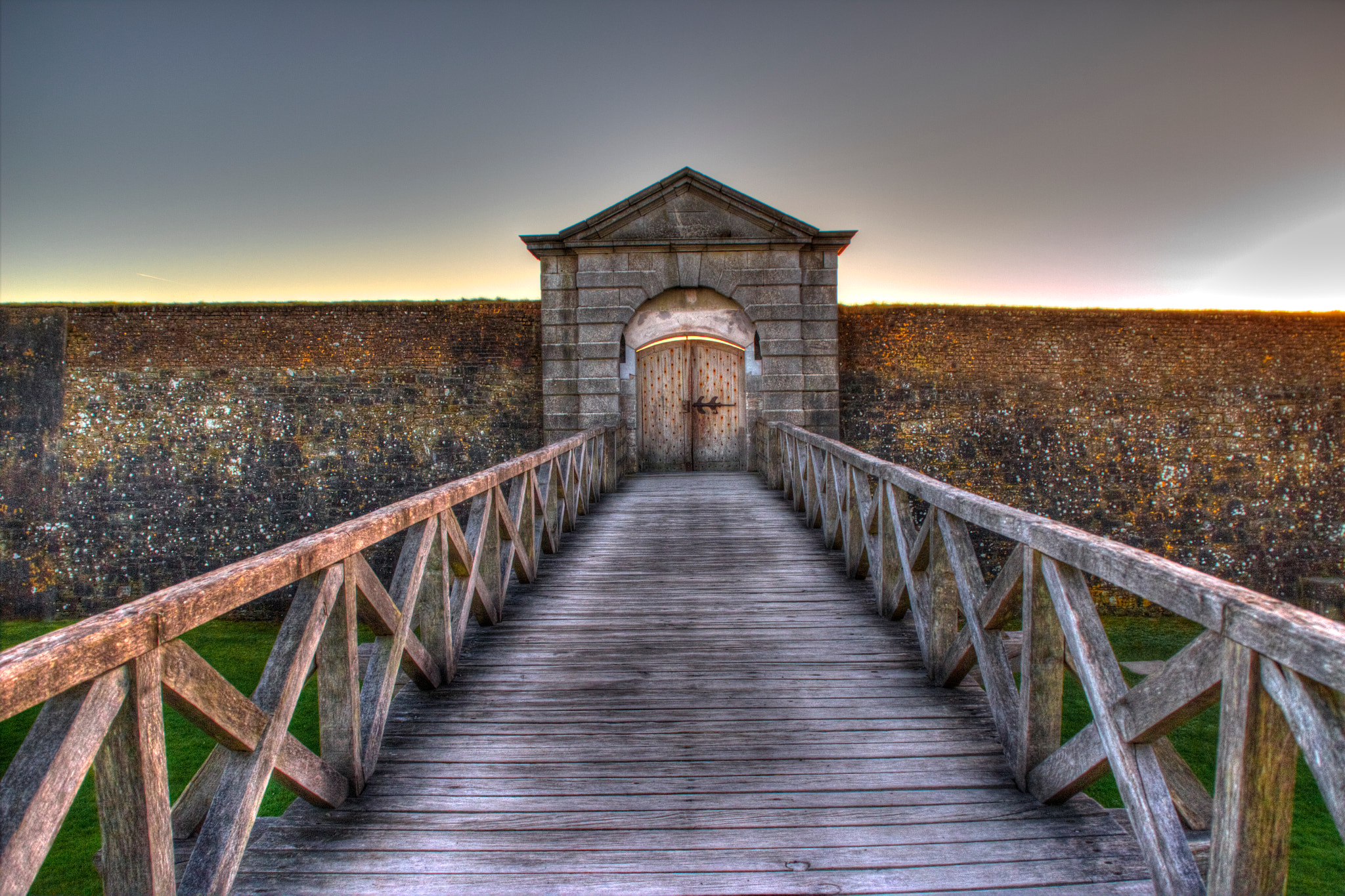
Entrance

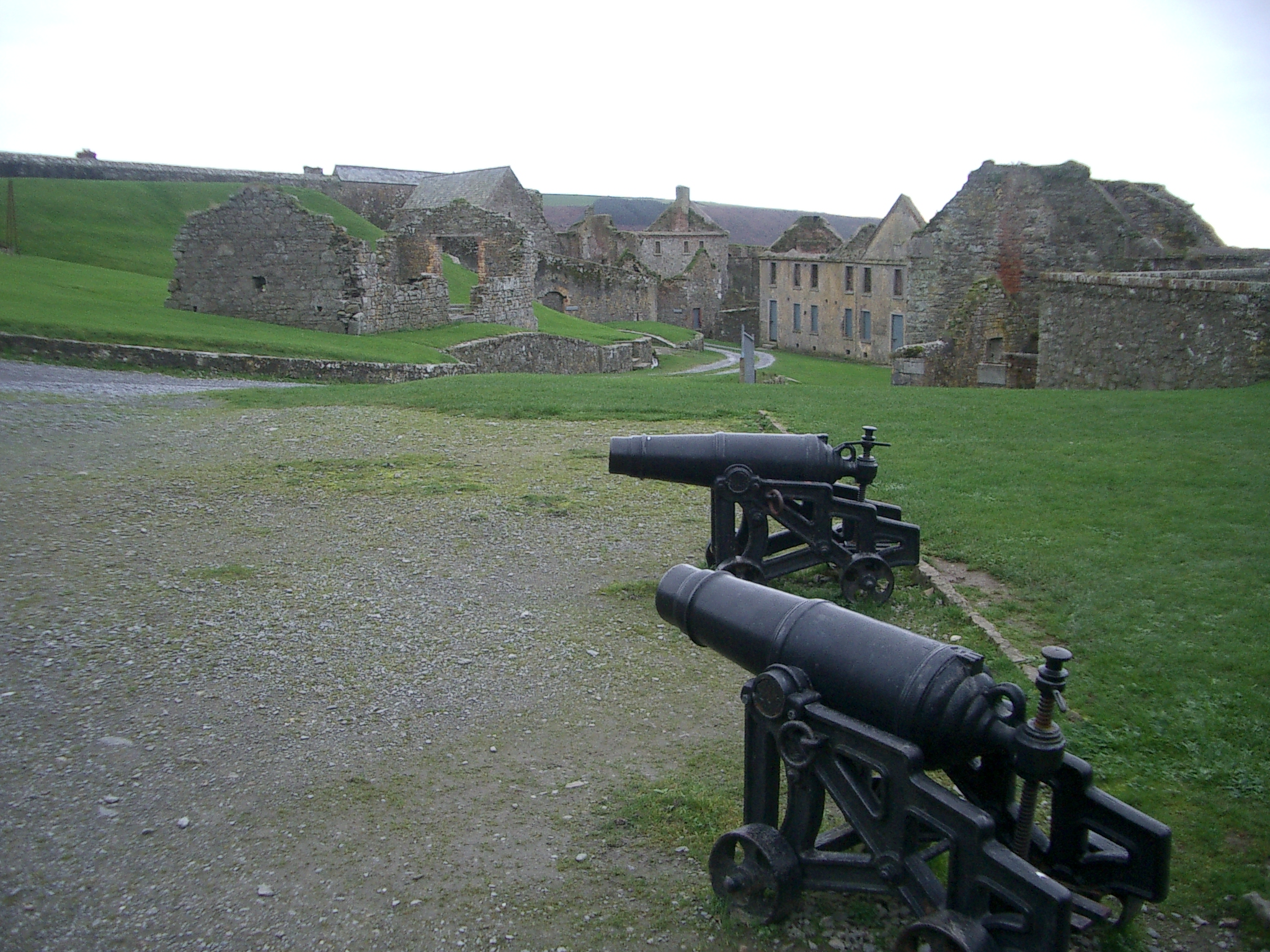
Carronades in the fort

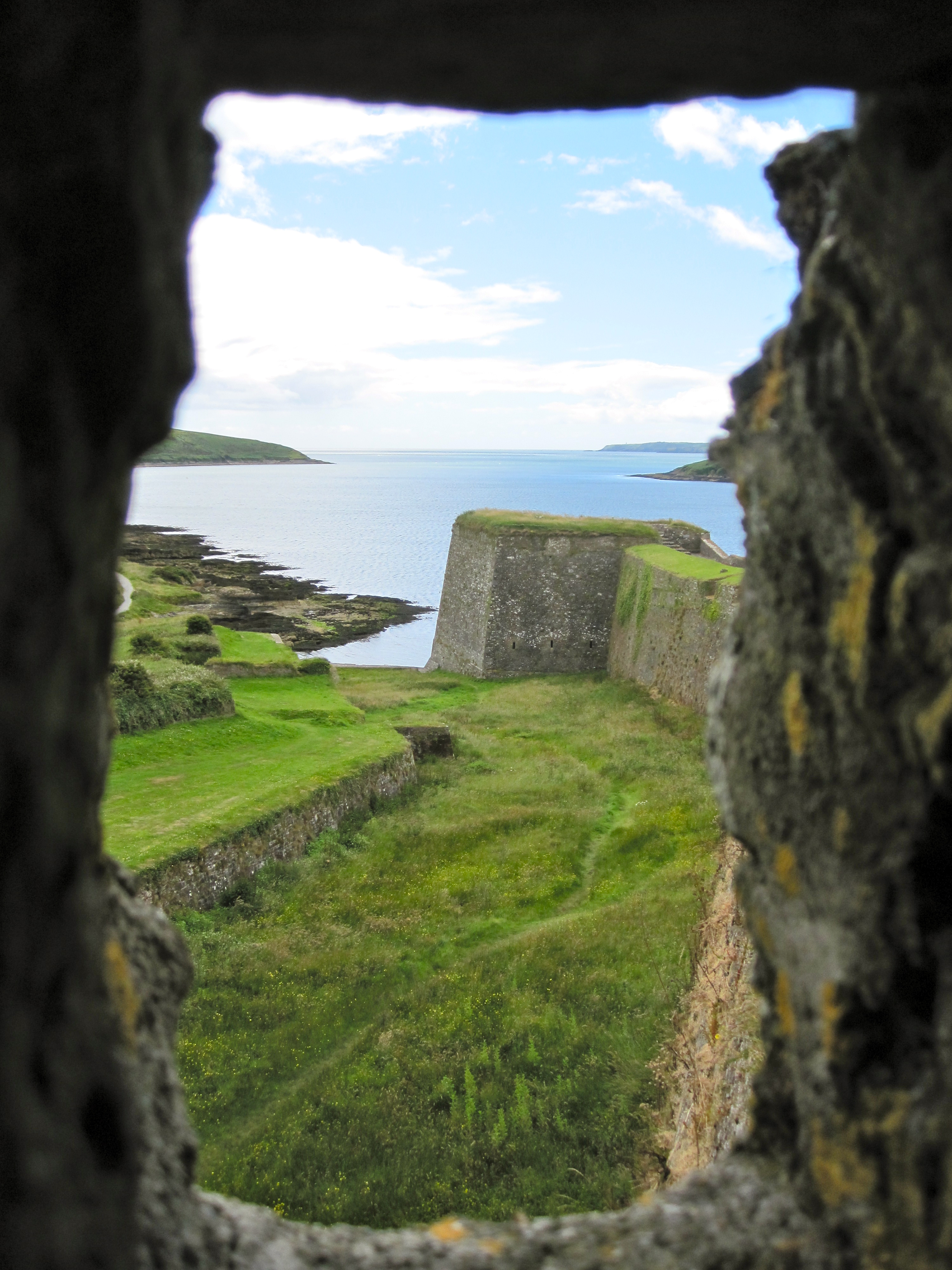
View from guard house

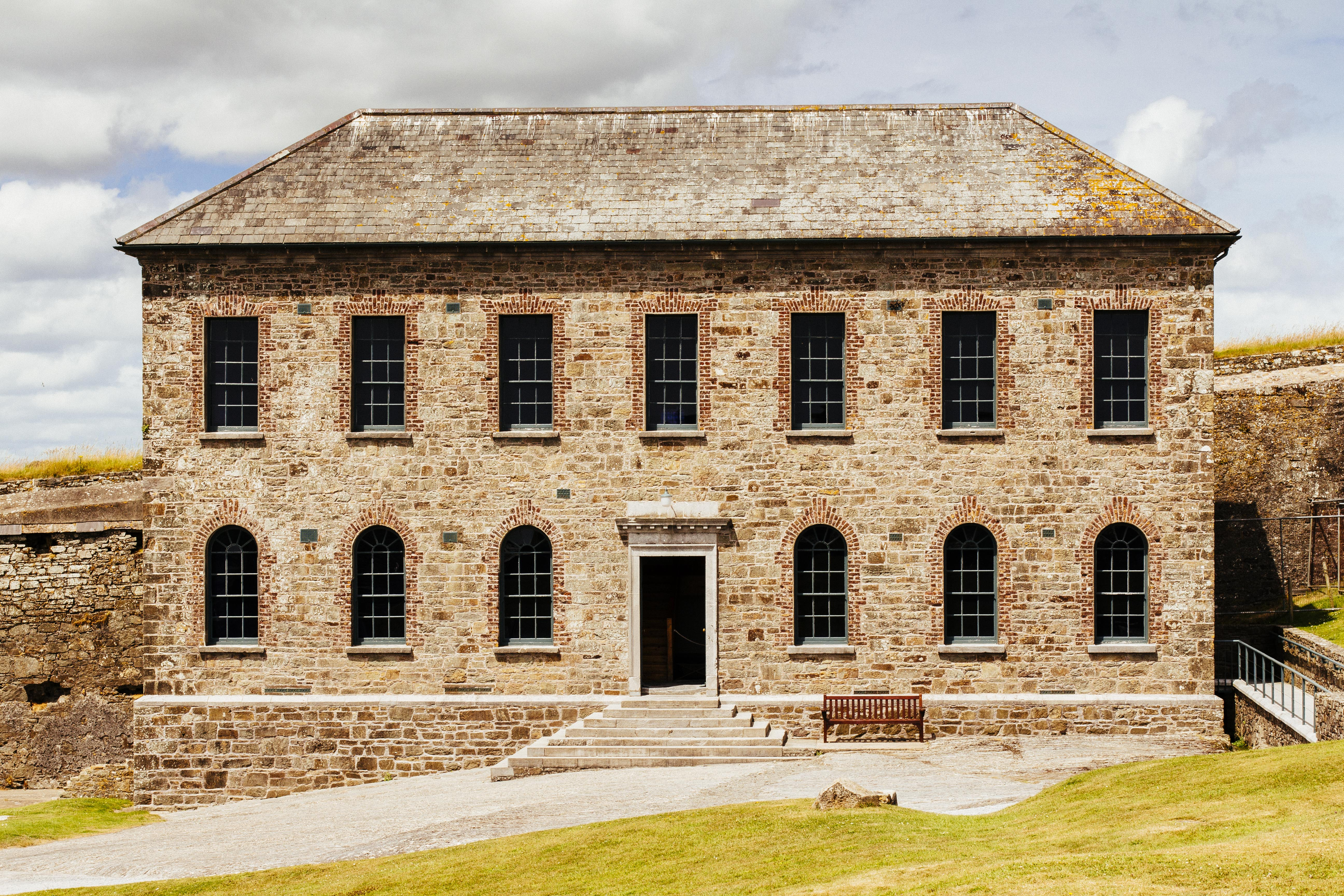
View of officer's house

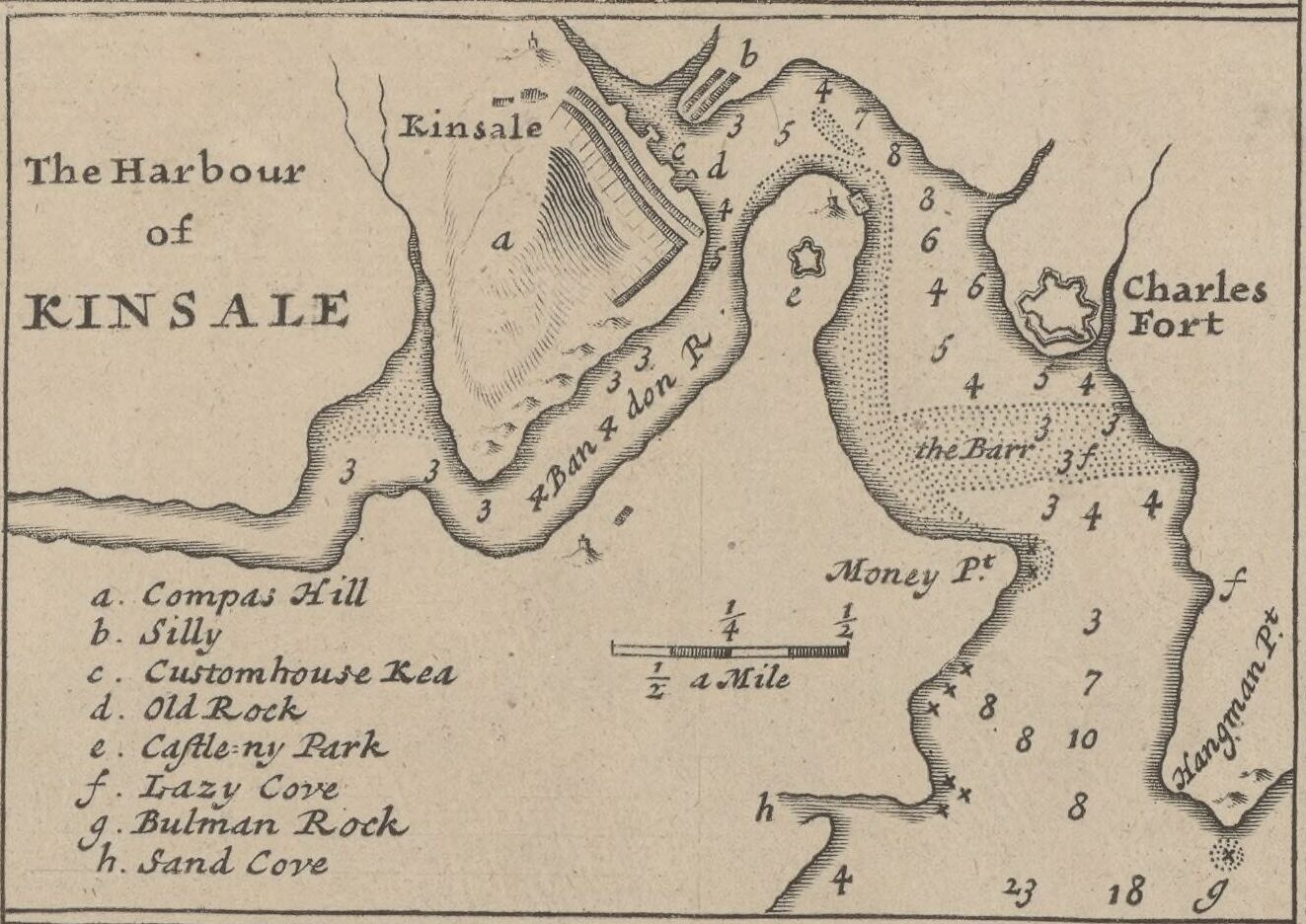
Kinsale Harbour in 1714, before the Royal Navy moved their operations to Cork

== See also ==
- Governor of Kinsale and Charles Fort
- Camden Fort Meagher - a similar coastal fortification defending Cork Harbour
