= Bastion (Irish restaurant) =

Restaurant in Kinsale, Ireland

- Location within County Cork

Restaurant information
- Established: February 2015
- Owners: Paul McDonald and Helen Noonan
- Head chef: Paul McDonald
- Food type: European cuisine
- Rating: Michelin Guide
- Location: Market Street, Kinsale, County Cork, P17 C996, Ireland
- Coordinates: 51°42′21″N 8°31′27″W
- Seating capacity: 50
- Website: www.bastionkinsale.com

Bastion is a restaurant (also described as a wine bar-cum-bistro) in Kinsale, County Cork, Ireland. It was awarded a Michelin star for 2020.

== History ==
Opened in 2015 by couple Paul McDonald and Helen Noonan, The Irish Examiner wrote "calling a relatively new restaurant Bastion in a resort town where there’s an enticing menu on almost every third doorway is a little statement of intent, challengers announcing their arrival as it were." Bastion won a Michelin star in 2020.

== Awards ==
- Michelin star: since 2020
- Bib Gourmand: 2016

== See also ==
- List of Michelin starred restaurants in Ireland
