= Kinsale =

Port town in County Cork, Ireland

Kinsale Irish: Cionn tSáile
- Town
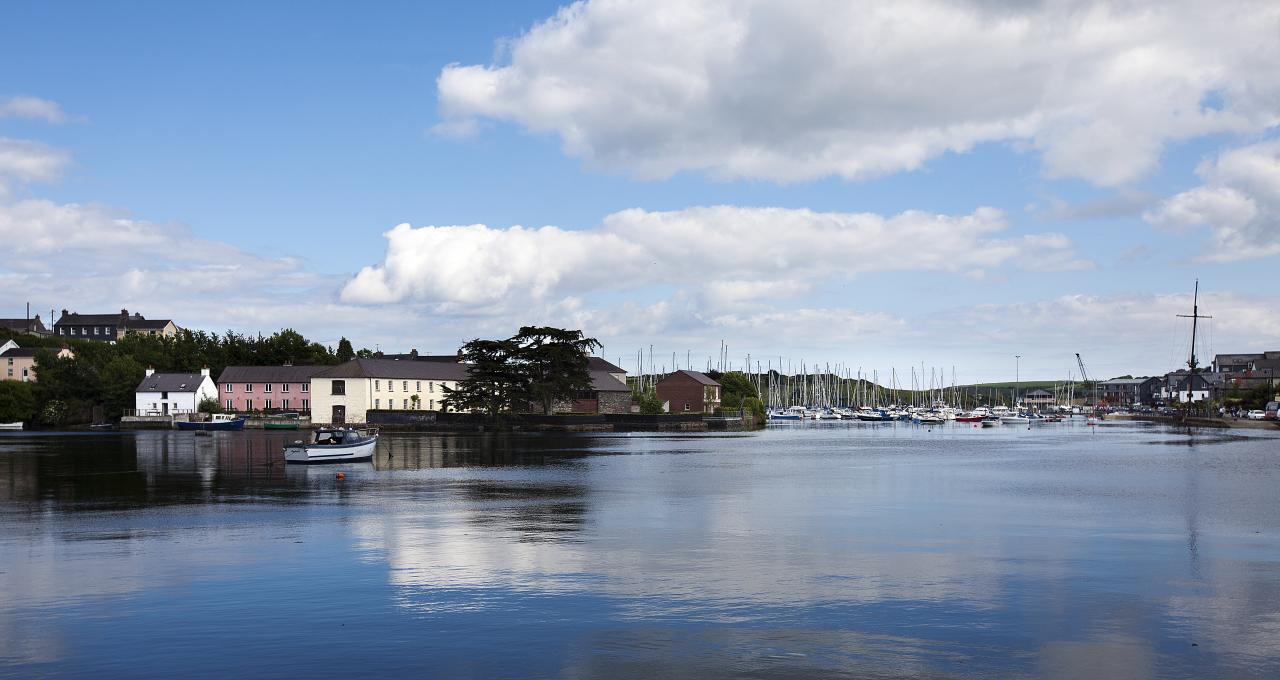
- Inner Kinsale harbour and marina

- Location in Ireland
- Coordinates: 51°42′20″N 8°31′20″W
- Country: Ireland
- Province: Munster
- County: County Cork
- Barony: Kinsale
- Elevation: 10 m (33 ft)

Population (2022)
  - Total: 5,991
- Time zone: UTC±0 (WET)
  - Summer (DST): UTC+1 (IST)
- Eircode routing key: P17
- Telephone area code: +353(0)21
- Irish Grid Reference: W637506
- Website: kinsale.ie

Kinsale (/kɪnˈseɪl/ kin-SAYL; Irish: Cionn tSáile, meaning 'head of the brine') is a historic port and fishing town in County Cork, Ireland. Located approximately 25 km (16 mi) south of Cork City on the southeast coast near the Old Head of Kinsale, it sits at the mouth of the River Bandon, and has a population of 5,991 (as of the 2022 census) which increases in the summer when tourism peaks. The town is in a civil parish of the same name.

Kinsale is a holiday destination for both Irish and overseas tourists. The town is known for its restaurants, including the Michelin-starred Bastion restaurant, and holds a number of annual gourmet food festivals.

As a historically strategic port town, Kinsale's notable buildings include Desmond Castle (associated with the Earls of Desmond and also known as the French Prison) of c. 1500, the 17th-century pentagonal bastion fort of James Fort on Castlepark peninsula, and Charles Fort, a partly restored star fort of 1677 in nearby Summercove. Other historic buildings include the Church of St Multose (Church of Ireland) of 1190, St John the Baptist (Catholic) of 1839, and the Market House of c. 1600. Kinsale is in the three-seat Dáil constituency of Cork South-West.

== History ==
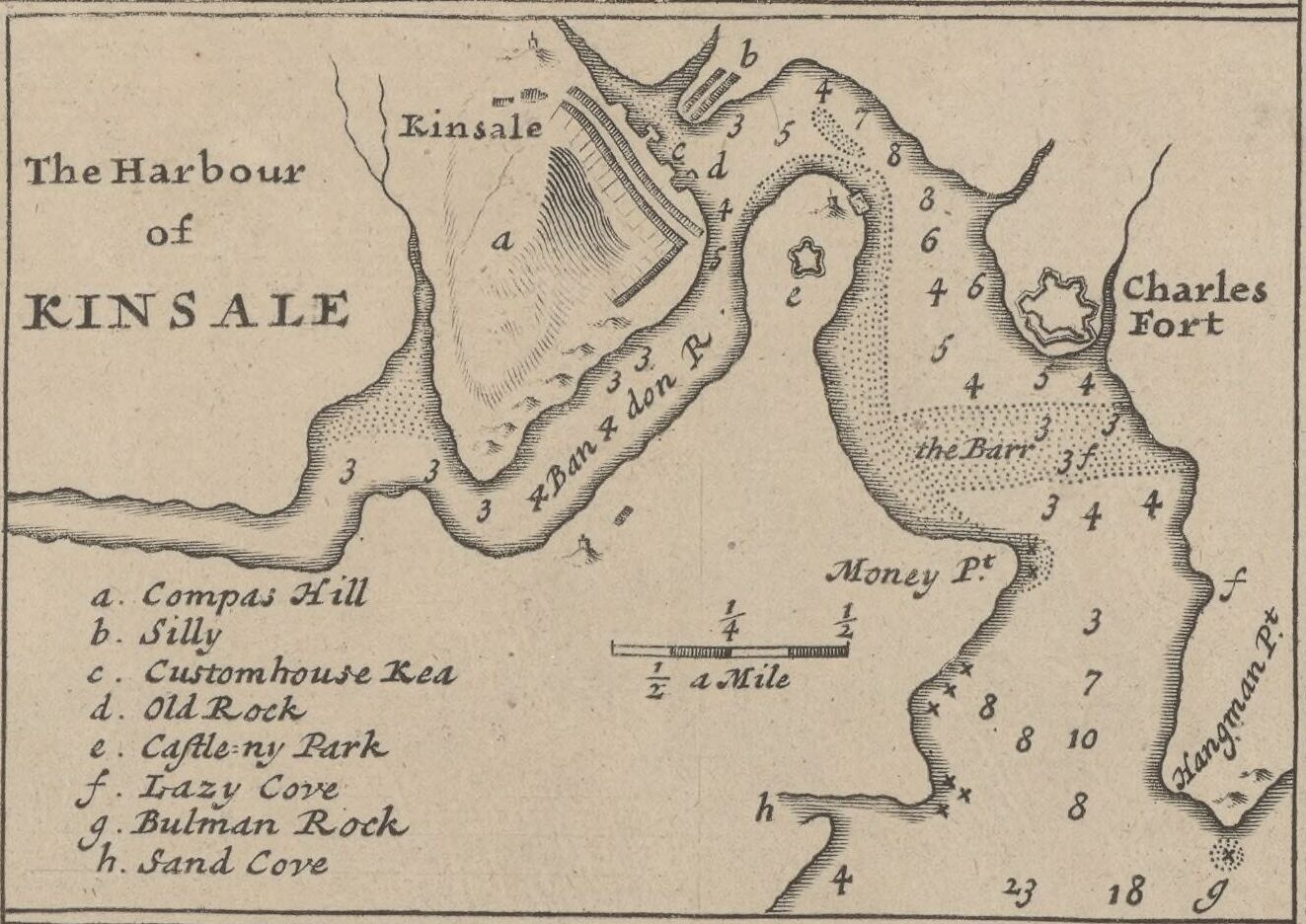
Kinsale in the early 18th century

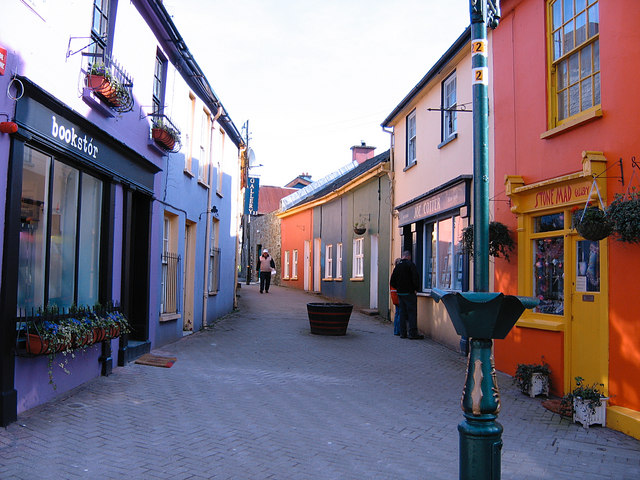
Kinsale is known for its historic streetscape and brightly coloured shops.

Historical population
| Year | Pop. | ±% |
|---|---|---|
| 1821 | 7,068 | — |
| 1831 | 7,312 | +3.5% |
| 1841 | 6,918 | −5.4% |
| 1851 | 5,501 | −20.5% |
| 1861 | 4,850 | −11.8% |
| 1871 | 6,404 | +32.0% |
| 1881 | 5,386 | −15.9% |
| 1891 | 4,605 | −14.5% |
| 1901 | 4,250 | −7.7% |
| 1911 | 4,020 | −5.4% |
| 1926 | 2,747 | −31.7% |
| 1936 | 2,422 | −11.8% |
| 1946 | 2,087 | −13.8% |
| 1951 | 1,930 | −7.5% |
| 1956 | 1,808 | −6.3% |
| 1961 | 1,763 | −2.5% |
| 1966 | 1,848 | +4.8% |
| 1971 | 1,989 | +7.6% |
| 1981 | 2,401 | +20.7% |
| 1986 | 2,581 | +7.5% |
| 1991 | 2,751 | +6.6% |
| 1996 | 3,064 | +11.4% |
| 2002 | 3,554 | +16.0% |
| 2006 | 4,099 | +15.3% |
| 2011 | 4,893 | +19.4% |
| 2016 | 5,281 | +7.9% |
| 2022 | 5,991 | +13.4% |

In January 1334, under a charter granted by Edward III, the Corporation of Kinsale was established to undertake local government in the town.

The corporation existed for over 500 years until the passing of the Municipal Corporations (Ireland) Act 1840, when local government in Kinsale was transferred to the town commissioners who had been elected in the town since 1828. The constituency of Kinsale returned two members to the Irish House of Commons prior to its abolition in 1800. From 1801 to 1885, the constituency of Kinsale elected one MP to the United Kingdom House of Commons.

In its history, Kinsale has also had links with Spain. In 1518, Archduke Ferdinand, later Emperor Ferdinand I, paid an unscheduled visit to the town, during which one of his staff wrote a remarkable account of its inhabitants.

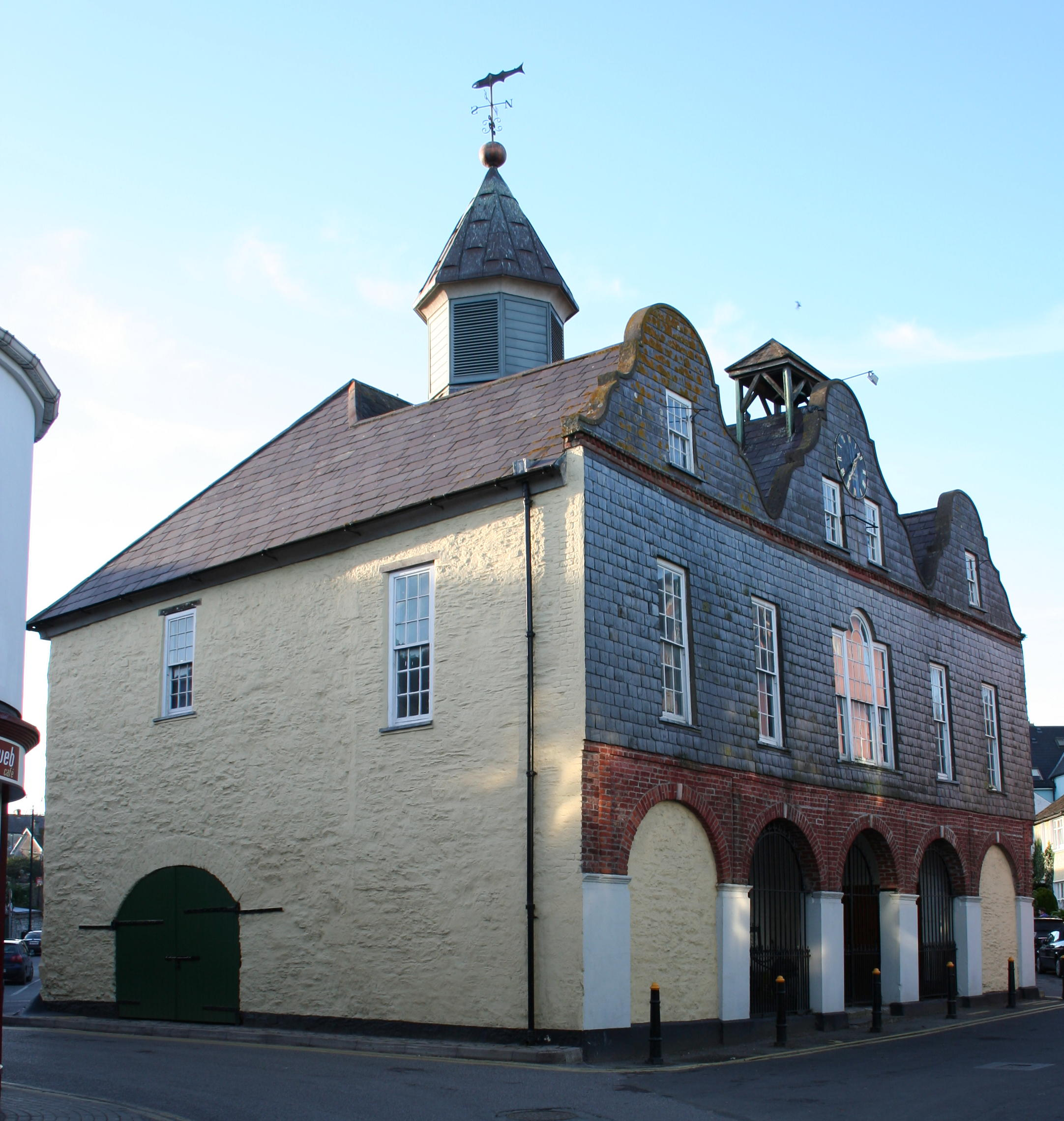
Market House; built c. 1600

In 1601, a Spanish military expedition to Ireland – the last of the Armadas launched against the Kingdom of England – landed in Kinsale in order to link with Irish rebel forces and attack England through Ireland. As a result, the Battle of Kinsale took place at the end of the Nine Years' War in which English forces, led by Charles Blount, 8th Baron Mountjoy, defeated the rebel Irish force, led by Hugh O'Neill, 2nd Earl of Tyrone and Red Hugh O'Donnell, two Gaelic princes from Ulster. The Irish forces were allied with the forces of Philip III of Spain.

In September 1607, a few years after this battle, the Flight of the Earls took place from Rathmullan in County Donegal in which a number of the native Irish aristocrats, including both Hugh O'Neill, 2nd Earl of Tyrone and Rory O'Donnell, 1st Earl of Tyrconnell, abandoned their lands and fled to Continental Europe. Shortly after the battle, James's Fort was built to protect the harbour. Completed by 1607, the central structure was a half-bastioned four-sided stone fortification, surrounded by pentagonal earthworks to a bastion fort or star-shaped fort design.

In 1649, Prince Rupert of the Rhine declared Charles II as King of England, Scotland and Ireland at St Multose's Church in Kinsale upon hearing of the execution of Charles I in London during the English Civil War. The Virginia trading fleet made this harbour the safest destination during their wartime voyages.

Charles Fort, located at Summer Cove and dating from 1677 in the reign of Charles II, is a bastion-fort that guards the entrance to Kinsale Harbour. It was built to protect the area and specifically the harbour from the use by the French and Spanish in the event of a landing in Ireland. James's Fort, which dates from the reign of James I, is located on the other side of the cove, on the Castlepark peninsula. Records indicate that an underwater chain was strung between the two forts across the harbour mouth during times of war to damage or block potential incoming enemy vessels.

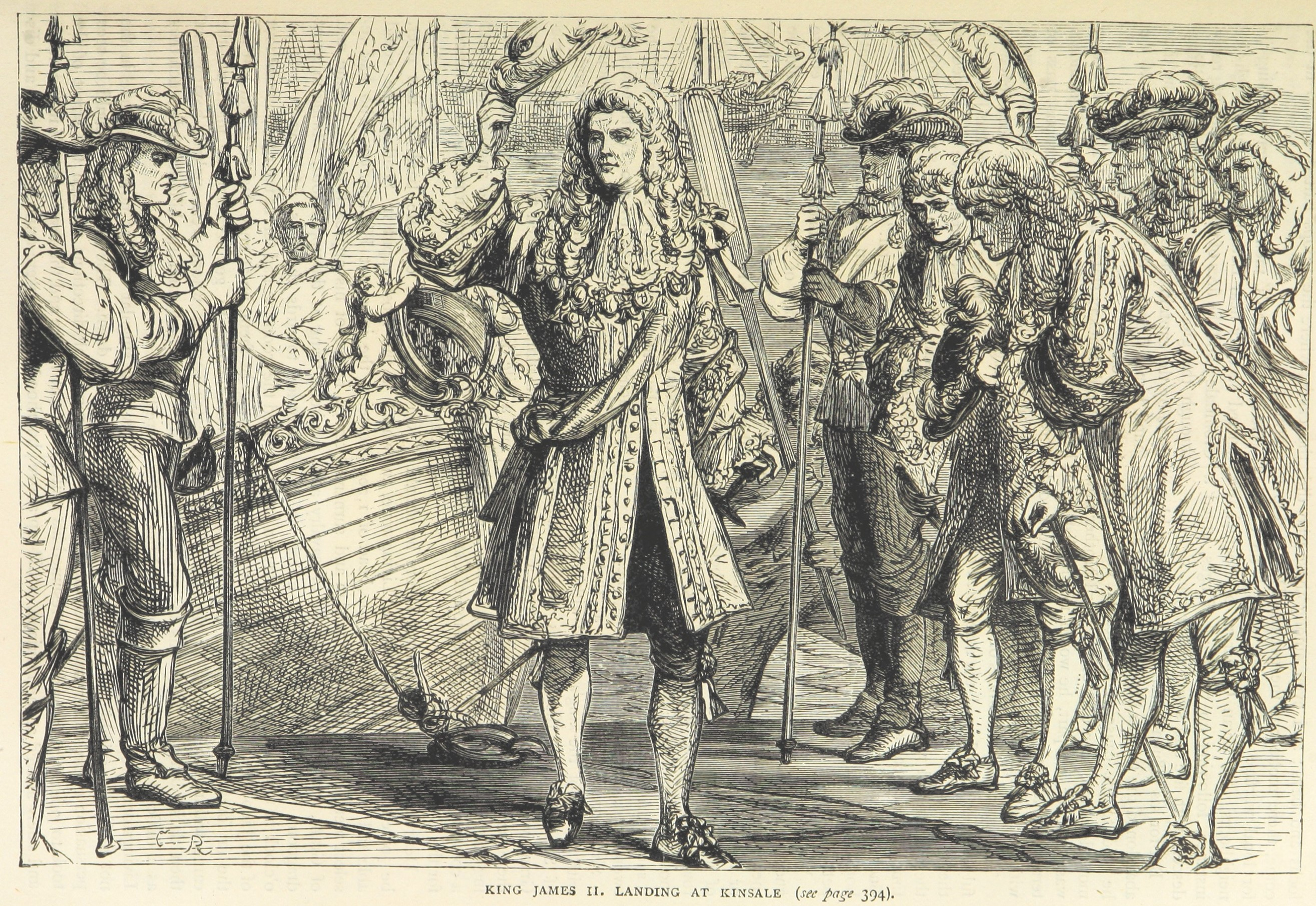
James II lands at Kinsale

James II landed at Kinsale in March 1689 with a force of 2,500 men, raised with the support of Louis XIV of France, as part of his campaign to regain power in England, Scotland and Ireland. In 1690, James II returned to exile in France from Kinsale, following his defeat at the Battle of the Boyne by William III after the Glorious Revolution (or Revolution of 1688) in England against the background of wars involving France under Louis XIV.

From 1694, Kinsale served as a supply base for Royal Navy vessels in southern Ireland, and a number of storehouses were built; it was limited to smaller vessels, however, due to the sandbar at the mouth of the river.

English navigator and privateer Captain Woodes Roger mentions Kinsale in the memoir of his 1708 expedition from Cork; in particular, he mentions a pair of rocks known as 'the Sovereigne's Bollacks' on which his ship almost ran aground. Kinsale's naval significance declined after the Royal Navy moved its victualling centre from Kinsale to Cork harbour in 1805 during the Napoleonic Wars in the period of France's First Empire.

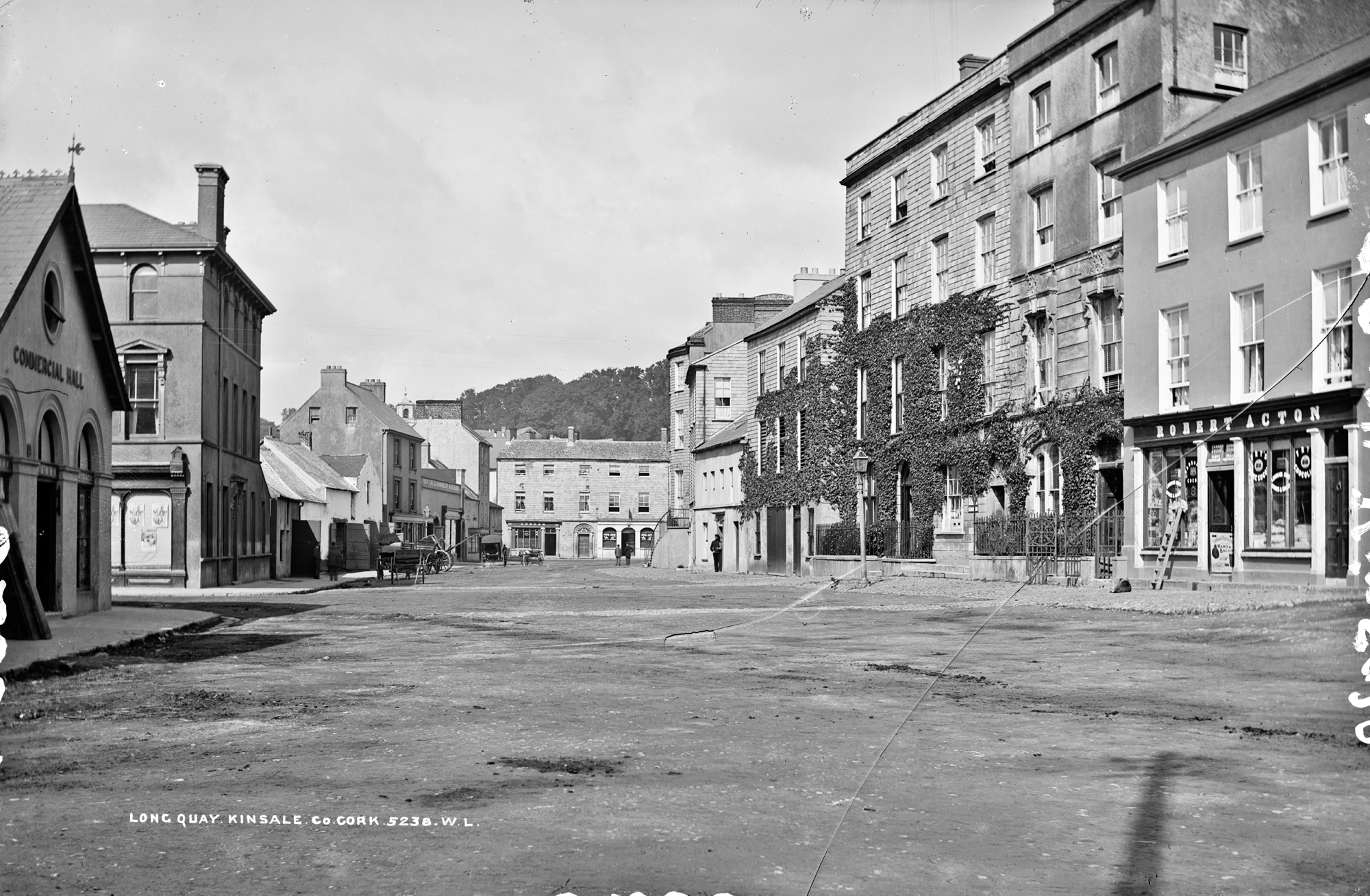
Long Quay, Kinsale, c. 1900

When the ocean liner RMS Lusitania was sunk by a U-boat of the German Empire on 7 May 1915 on a voyage from New York City to Liverpool during the First World War, some of the bodies and survivors were brought to Kinsale and the subsequent inquest on the bodies recovered was held in the town's courthouse.

Kinsale was linked by a branch line via Farrangalway and Ballymartle to the Irish railway system of the Cork, Bandon and South Coast Railway and its successors from 1863 until 1931, when the branch was closed by the Great Southern Railways during a low point in Kinsale's economic fortunes. The station, inconveniently located for the town and harbour, was on Barrack Hill and the line ran to a junction at Crossbarry on the Cork (Albert Quay) to Bandon line.

In 2005, Kinsale became Ireland's second Fair Trade Town, with Clonakilty being the first. Kinsale, with its "electrifyingly bright streets", was rated as among the "20 most beautiful villages in the UK and Ireland" by Condé Nast Traveler in 2020.

== Administration ==
The Town Commissioners became Kinsale Urban District Council under the Local Government (Ireland) Act 1898, which in turn became Kinsale Town Council in 2002. In 2014 when this layer of local government was abolished in Ireland as part of measures to reduce the budget deficit following the 2008 financial crisis. The local electoral area of Bandon–Kinsale elects 6 members to Cork County Council.

== Transport ==
Bus Éireann provides Kinsale's primary means of public transport. Buses regularly operate from Kinsale to Cork City, with most of these stopping at Cork Airport on the way. Kinsale and Bandon are linked by public transport with a bus service provided by Local Link Cork.

The Archdeacon Duggan Bridge, on the R600 road to the south-west of the town, was opened in 1977. It is named after Father Tom Duggan OBE, MC, a chaplain in both WWI and WWII, and later a missionary priest in Peru. This bridge replaced an older cast iron structure of the early 1880s which was located approximately three kilometres (two miles) upstream on the River Bandon, near the townland of Tisaxon More (Tigh Sacsan Mór). This earlier bridge, some remains of which are still visible, was known as the Western Bridge.

== Education ==
There are a number of primary and secondary-level schools in the area. The local community school, Kinsale Community School, has previously been named the "best school in the Republic of Ireland" and received awards at the BT Young Scientist Exhibition.

Kinsale College, a campus on the Cork College of Further Education and Training, offers a number of further education courses.

== Community and sports groups ==
Kinsale Yacht Club (KYC) began in 1950 and today is a sailing club that runs events for all ages of sailors and social activities throughout the year. Junior sailing includes Optimists, Lasers and 420's. The yacht classes include Squib (keelboat), International Dragon (keelboat) and A-Class Catamaran as well as three Cruiser Classes (Class I, II and III).

Founded in 1982, the grounds of Kinsale Rugby Football Club are used for the annual Kinsale Sevens event, which attracts international teams and thousands of spectators annually.

Kinsale GAA club plays in the Carrigdhoun division of Cork GAA. They won the Cork Football Intermediate County Championship in 2011, the first time since 1915.

Kinsale Badminton club which is affiliated with Badminton Ireland is based in St Multose Hall Kinsale. It caters to both adult and juvenile players and enters teams in Cork county Leagues and Cups.

The Kinsale Branch of the Irish Red Cross has been in existence since 1939 and is staffed by volunteers, who are present at local events and activities – including the annual Kinsale Sevens rugby event. The Kinsale Red Cross has 2 ambulances which are housed in a purpose-built building in Church Lane and crewed by trained volunteers.

Kinsale competes in the Irish Tidy Towns Competition and was the overall winner in 1986.

Kinsale is the first 'Transition Town' in Ireland, and the Transition Town community organisation, supported by Kinsale town council, holds meetings locally. It has taken some guidance from the Kinsale Energy Descent Action Plan 2021, which has spawned further Transition Towns worldwide.

== Entertainment and culture ==
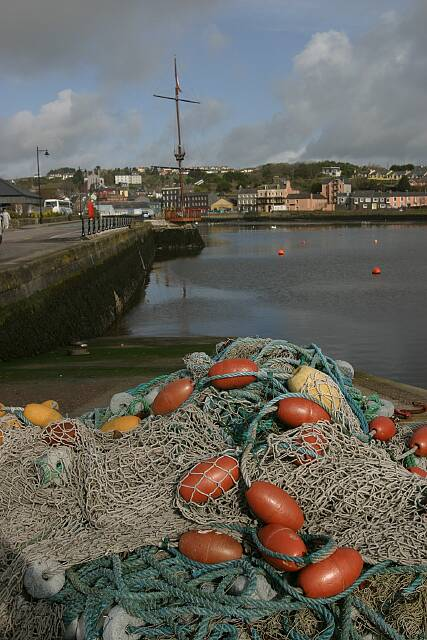
Kinsale quayside

Kinsale hosts an annual jazz festival, which takes place during the last weekend of October. Pubs and hotels in the town host concerts by jazz and blues groups throughout the weekend, including on the last Monday of October (which is a bank holiday in Ireland).

The monumental steel, originally unpainted, sculpture The Great Wall of Kinsale, by Eilis O'Connell and installed in 1988 to celebrate Kinsale's achievements in the Tidy Towns competition, stands by Pier Road and Town Park.

Bastion, a restaurant on Market/Main streets, received a Michelin Star in 2020. Chef Keith Floyd was previously a resident of Kinsale.

== Government and politics ==
The town forms part of the Bandon-Kinsale electoral district on Cork County Council and is part of the Cork South-West constituency for Dáil Éireann elections.

== Twin towns – Sister cities ==
Kinsale is twinned with:

- Newport, Rhode Island, United States
- Mumbles, Wales
- Portofino, Italy
- Antibes, France

== Development ==
Residential developments in the 21st century include the Convent Garden scheme near the historic centre. This development involves the conversion of the former St Josephs Convent of the Sisters of Mercy on Ramparts Lane into 79 apartments and the building of 94 houses in the grounds. After several years of inactivity, construction and sales activity recommenced in 2015 and 2016.

A further residential development, Abbey Fort, includes 260 units at the north end of Kinsale. Initial phases were completed in 2007–2012. Part of the 22-acre site at Abbey Fort was sold by the National Asset Management Agency in December 2015.

== Demographics ==
As of the 2011 census, ethnically Kinsale was 76.5% White Irish, 18.5% other white, 0.5% black, 1% Asian, and 1% 'other', with 2.5% not stated. In terms of religion, the 2011 census captured a population that was 76% Catholic, 10% other stated religions (mainly Protestant), 11% with no religion, and 3% not stated.

By the 2022 census, the town had a usually resident population of 5,755. Of these, 74.4% identified as White Irish and 16.1% as other white ethnicities. A further 0.7% identified as Black or Black Irish, 2.6% as Asian or Asian Irish and 2.2% as other ethnicities. 3.9% did not state their ethnicity. In terms of religion, 61.0% identified as Catholic, 9.9% belonged to other religions and over 29% indicated that they had no religion or did not state a religious affiliation.

== Notable people ==
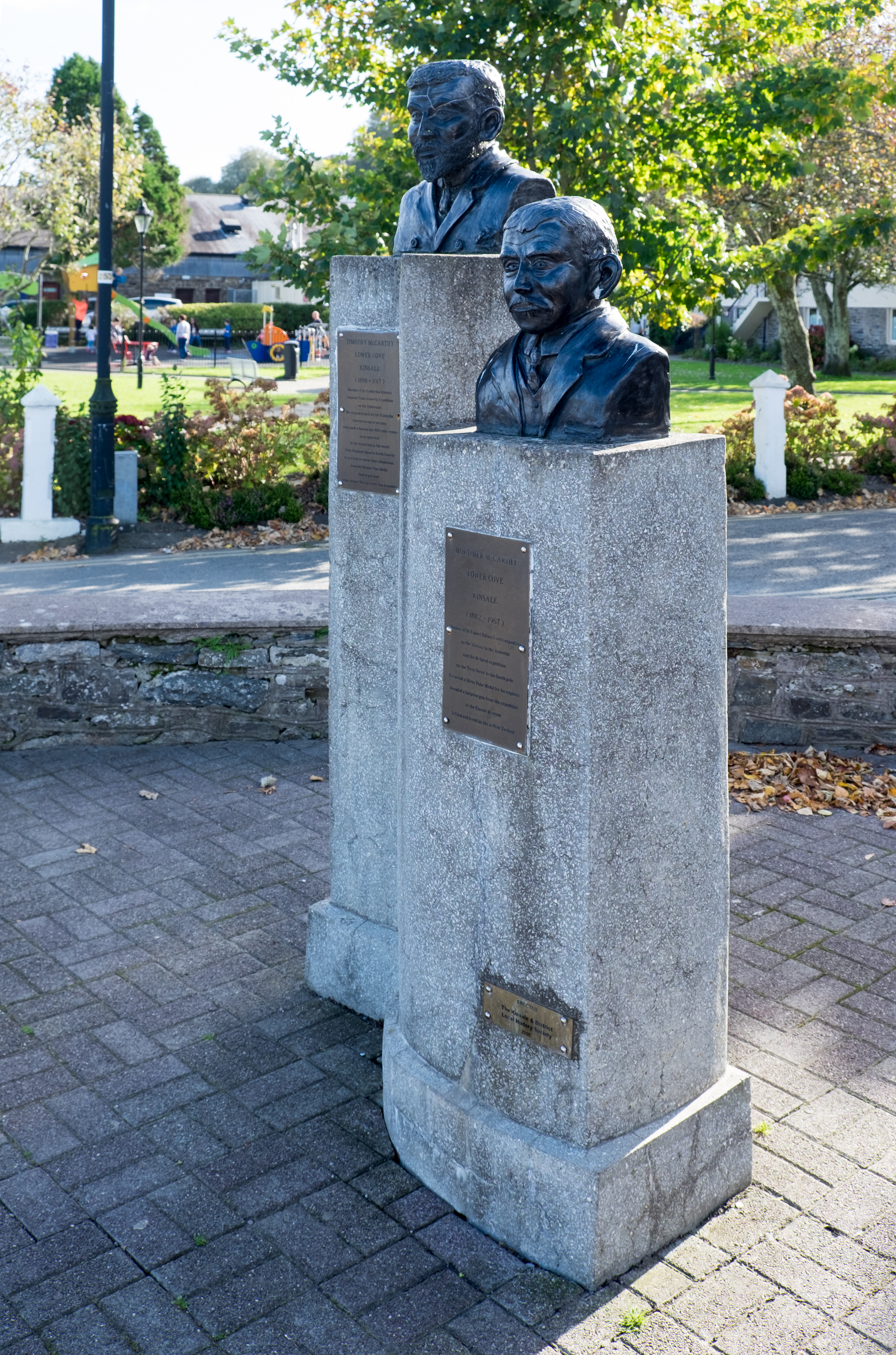
Harbour-side memorial to Timothy and Mortimer McCarthy by Graham Brett, 2000

- Henry Rowe (1812–1870), architect
- Achilles Daunt (1832–1878), Church of Ireland clergyman; born in Kinsale
- Mary Baptist Russell (1829– 1898) Mercy Sister, nurse, philanthropist, and educator
- Aidan Higgins (1927–2015), poet and novelist; lived in Kinsale
- Aisling Judge (b.1991), scientist and winner of the Young Scientist and Technology Exhibition. Born in Kinsale
- Arthur O'Connor (1763–1852), president of the United Irishmen and a general in Napoleon's armies; lived near Kinsale
- Ciara Judge (b.1998), scientist and 2014 Grand Prize Winner of Google Science Fair. Born in Kinsale
- Derek Mahon (1941-2020), Ulster poet, from Belfast; lived in Kinsale for many years
- Desmond O'Grady (1935–2014), poet; lived in Kinsale
- Eamonn O'Neill (1882–1954), Kinsale businessman and politician
- Edward Bowen (1780–1866), Canadian judge and lawyer; born in Kinsale
- Eileen Desmond (1932–2005), TD, senator, MEP, and government minister; born in Kinsale
- Ethel Colburn Mayne (1865–1941), writer, biographer, literary critic, journalist and translator; grew up in Kinsale
- Finbar Wright (b.1957), tenor; born near Kinsale
- Gervais Parker (1695–1750), British Army officer; Governor of Kinsale
- Jack Barrett (1910–1979), All-Ireland winning hurler; born in Kinsale
- James Dennis, 1st Baron Tracton (1721–1782), Irish judge and politician; born near Kinsale
- John Duncan Craig (1830–1909), poet and Church of Ireland clergyman; lived in Kinsale
- John Fergus O'Hea (c. 1838–1922); political cartoonist AKA "Spex"; born in Kinsale
- John Folliot (1691–1762), British Army officer; Lieutenant-Governor of Kinsale
- John Handcock (1755–1786), British Army officer; Lieutenant-Governor of Kinsale
- John Sullivan (1830–1884), recipient of the Victoria Cross
- John William Fenton (1828–1890), musician; born in Kinsale
- Joseph Ward (1832–1872), British soldier and recipient of the Victoria Cross; born in Kinsale
- Keith Floyd (1943–2009), chef; lived near Kinsale
- Lennox Robinson (1886–1958), poet and dramatist; lived in Kinsale
- Mother Mary Francis (1813–1888), born as Joanna Bridgeman, nun and nursing pioneer; lived in Kinsale
- Moira Deady (1922–2010), actress; lived in Kinsale
- Mortimer McCarthy (1882–1967), sailor and Antarctic explorer on Scott's Terra Nova Expedition; born in Kinsale
- Paddy Collins (1903–1995), All-Ireland winning hurler; born in Kinsale
- Padraic Fallon (1905–1974), poet; lived in Kinsale
- Patrick Cotter O'Brien (1760–1806), first man verified to have reached over 8 feet in height; born in Kinsale
- Peter McDermott (1918–2011), All-Ireland winning footballer for County Meath; born near Kinsale
- Ray Cummins (b.1948), All-Ireland winning Hurler; lives in Kinsale
- Rev. Patrick MacSwiney (1885–1940), priest, scholar, antiquarian, historian and founder of the Kinsale Regional Museum
- Robert Gibbings (1889–1958), artist and author; lived in Kinsale
- Ron Holland (b.1947), yacht designer; lives in Kinsale
- SEARLS (b. 1991), songwriter and West End performer; born in Kinsale
- Sir Robert Southwell (1635–1702), diplomat, Secretary of State for Ireland and president of the Royal Society; born near Kinsale
- Thomas Johnson (1872–1963), first leader of the Irish Labour Party in Dáil Éireann; lived in Kinsale
- Timothy McCarthy (1888–1917), sailor and explorer on Ernest Shackleton's Imperial Trans-Antarctic Expedition; born in Kinsale
- Timothy O'Keeffe (1926–1994), publisher who worked with Flann O'Brien; born in Kinsale
- Tony Scannell (1945–2020), actor; born in Kinsale
- Henry Bathurst (1623–1676), Recorder of Cork, was also Recorder of Kinsale and lived at Castlepark in Kinsale

== See also ==
- List of towns and villages in the Republic of Ireland
- List of RNLI stations
- List of market houses in the Republic of Ireland
