= McCarthy Island (South Georgia) =

Island at the entrance of King Haakon Bay, South Georgia Island

- Location within Antarctica
- Etymology: Timothy McCarthy, a seaman on the Endurance

Geography
- Location: King Haakon Bay, South Georgia Island
- Coordinates: 54°10′S 37°26′W
- Length: 1.852 km (1.1508 mi)

McCarthy Island is an island, 1 nautical mile (2 km) long, lying in the entrance to King Haakon Bay on the south side of South Georgia. It was surveyed by the South Georgia Survey in the period 1951–57, and was named by the UK Antarctic Place-Names Committee after Timothy McCarthy, a seaman on the Endurance during the British expedition under Ernest Shackleton, 1914–16. McCarthy accompanied Shackleton in the James Caird from Elephant Island to King Haakon Bay.

== See also ==
- List of Antarctic and sub-Antarctic islands
