= Castlepark =

Peninsula in County Cork, Ireland

Coordinates: 51.6952°N 8.5153°W

Location of Castlepark within Kinsale harbour

The marina at Castlepark in 2002, looking south-eastwards from Compass Hill on the Kinsale side of the Bandon River. The image also shows the village which straddles the neck of land joining the James's Fort townland to the main body of the peninsula. James's Fort, which is not pictured, is off to the left

The Castlepark peninsula in Kinsale harbour on the coast of County Cork, on the south coast of Ireland is really more a presque-isle than a peninsula, being joined to the mainland only by an extremely narrow neck at its north-western corner. Thus, the Castlepark peninsula is almost surrounded by water: the River Bandon, flowing from the north-west, bounds the peninsula on the north; the entrance to Kinsale harbour bounds the peninsula on the east; the Atlantic Ocean bounds it to the south; and the tidal inlet known as Sandycove Creek bounds the peninsula on the west. Most traffic into Castlepark now arrives via the Duggan Bridge, built in 1976, which crosses the River Bandon from the northern, Kinsale, bank just east of the neck which joins the peninsula to the mainland.

== History ==
Among the old buildings on the peninsula are: James's Fort (early 17th century); Ringrone Castle (12th or 13th century), a former seat of the de Courcy Barons Kingsale; and the ruins of Ringrone Church, the latter surrounded by an ancient graveyard that is still in use.

Court records from the later seventeenth century show that much of the land was held by two families, the Brocketts and the Bathursts, both fairly recently arrived from England. A series of lawsuits testify to the poor relations between the two families.

== Geography ==
Located within the parish of Courceys, Castlepark peninsula, which has an area of a little under 500 acres (2.0 km^{2}), contains three townlands: James's Fort, Castlepark and Castlelands.

James's Fort townland, which contains James's Fort, is, itself, a peninsula, protruding out of the north-eastern corner of the Castlepark peninsula. On the western side of the neck which joins James's Fort townland to the main Castlepark peninsula, there is a marina; on the eastern side of the neck, there is a sandy beach; a small village, most of whose houses were built in the 1970s although some date back to at least the early 19th century, straddles the neck.

The rest of the peninsula consists of farmland with scattered housing. Most of the land is used for tillage (cereals and sugar beet), although there is some grazing of cattle and sheep. By the late 1990s, only one of the farms was still involved in dairying.

Sandycove Island, an uninhabited island, is at the mouth of Sandycove Creek.

== Gallery ==
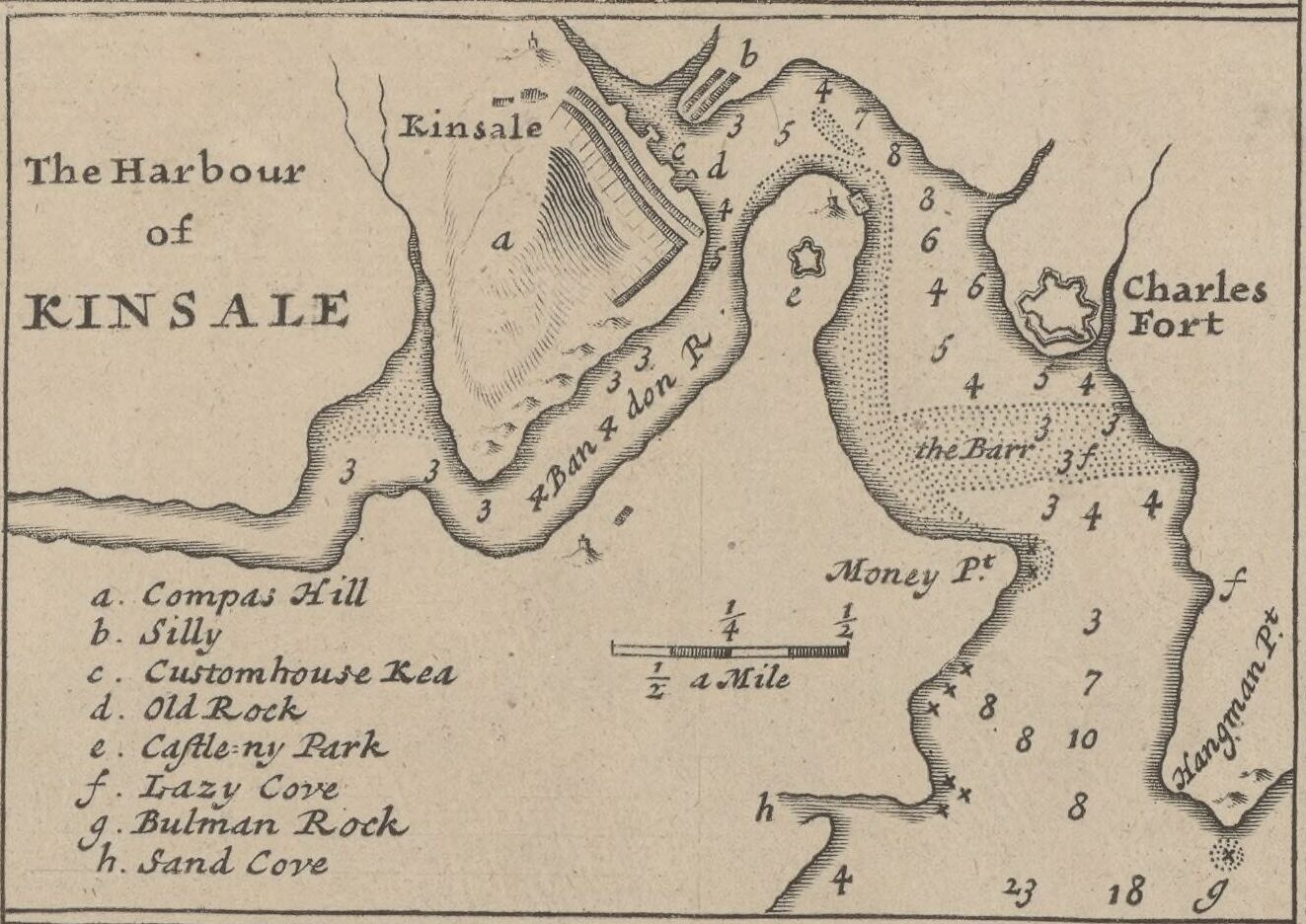
Herman Moll's 1714 map of Kinsale Harbour, including Castlepark

The blockhouse, part of the James's Fort complex at Castlepark; taken from the Scilly side of Kinsale Harbour, looking southwards

Map of Castlepark, closeup detail.
