= 2008–09 Leinster Rugby season =

Leinster Rugby
- 2008–09 season
- Manager: (Australia) Michael Cheika
- Captain: (Ireland) Leo Cullen
- Celtic League: 3rd
- Heineken Cup: Champions
- British and Irish Cup: Quarter-finals
- Top try scorer: All: Luke Fitzgerald (9)
- Top points scorer: All: Felipe Contepomi (225)
- Highest home attendance: 18,500 vs Munster; 28 September 2008
- Lowest home attendance: 10,910 vs Glasgow Warriors; 25 April 2009
- Average home attendance: 15,466
Home colours	Away colours	Third colours

The 2008–09 Leinster Rugby season was Leinster's eighth competing in the Celtic League alongside which they competed in the 2008–09 Heineken Cup.

Though Leinster lost their Celtic League crown to rivals Munster, they won their first Heineken Cup title. They topped their European Cup pool despite away losses to French side Castres and English side Wasps. Victory over Harlequins in the quarter-finals followed, despite the Bloodgate Scandal. Leinster overcame Munster 25–6 in a semi-final in Dublin's Croke Park that broke the world record attendance for a club rugby union game with a crowd of over 82,200. Leinster won the 2009 European Cup Final in Murrayfield Stadium in Edinburgh, beating Leicester Tigers 19–16 to claim their first European crown.

Rocky Elsom was player of the year. Felipe Contepomi was the Celtic League's joint top scorer, level with the Ospreys' James Hook on 161 points, and was voted the supporters' club's Leinster Legend.

== Squad ==
Note: Flags indicate national union under World Rugby eligibility rules. Players may hold more than one non-World Rugby nationality.

Player	Position	Union
John Fogarty	Hooker	Ireland
Bernard Jackman	Hooker	Ireland
Cian Healy	Prop	Ireland
Ronan McCormack	Prop	Ireland
CJ van der Linde	Prop	South Africa
Stan Wright	Prop	Cook Islands
Leo Cullen (c)	Lock	Ireland
Trevor Hogan	Lock	Ireland
Malcolm O'Kelly	Lock	Ireland
Cameron Jowitt	Lock	New Zealand
Devin Toner	Lock	Ireland
Rocky Elsom	Flanker	Australia
Shane Jennings	Flanker	Ireland
Kevin McLaughlin	Flanker	Ireland
Seán O'Brien	Flanker	Ireland
Jamie Heaslip	Number 8	Ireland
Stephen Keogh	Number 8	Ireland

Player	Position	Union
Chris Keane	Scrum-half	Ireland
Paul O'Donohoe	Scrum-half	Ireland
Chris Whitaker	Scrum-half	Australia
Felipe Contepomi	Fly-half	Argentina
Johnny Sexton	Fly-half	Ireland
Gordon D'Arcy	Centre	Ireland
Fergus McFadden	Centre	Ireland
Brian O'Driscoll	Centre	Ireland
Luke Fitzgerald	Wing	Ireland
Shane Horgan	Wing	Ireland
Simon Keogh	Wing	Ireland
Isa Nacewa	Wing	Fiji
Girvan Dempsey	Fullback	Ireland
Rob Kearney	Fullback	Ireland
Felix Jones	Fullback	Ireland

== Match Attendance ==
Leinster's average Celtic League attendance was 14,728, up 415 on the 2007-08 season.

Leinster's Heineken Cup semi final against Munster, held in Croke Park, set the record for the highest attendance in club rugby history at over 82,000.

== 2008–09 Celtic League Fixtures ==
Date	Home team	Score	Away Team	Score	Venue
5 September 2008	(Wales) Cardiff Blues	16	(Ireland) Leinster	16	Cardiff Arms Park, Cardiff
12 September 2008	(Ireland) Leinster	52	(Scotland) Edinburgh Rugby	6	RDS Arena, Dublin
19 September 2008	(Ireland) Leinster	19	(Wales) Ospreys	13	RDS Arena, Dublin
28 September 2008	(Ireland) Leinster	0	(Ireland) Munster	18	RDS Arena, Dublin
5 October 2008	(Ireland) Connacht	19	(Ireland) Leinster	18	Sportsgrounds, Galway
24 October 2008	(Scotland) Glasgow Warriors	15	(Ireland) Leinster	12	Firhill, Glasgow
29 November 2008	(Ireland) Leinster	29	(Wales) Newport Gwent Dragons	13	RDS Arena, Dublin
27 December 2008	(Ireland) Ulster	13	(Ireland) Leinster	21	Ravenhill, Belfast
2 January 2009	(Ireland) Leinster	26	(Ireland) Connacht	18	RDS Arena, Dublin
10 January 2009	(Ireland) Leinster	21	(Wales) Cardiff Blues	20	RDS Arena, Dublin
21 February 2009	(Wales) Scarlets	17	(Ireland) Leinster	31	Parc y Scarlets, Llanelli
6 March 2009	(Wales) Ospreys	8	(Ireland) Leinster	13	Liberty Stadium
29 March 2009	(Ireland) Leinster	32	(Ireland) Ulster	6	RDS Arena, Dublin
4 April 2009	(Ireland) Munster	22	(Ireland) Leinster	5	Thomond Park, Limerick
17 April 2009	(Scotland) Edinburgh Rugby	27	(Ireland) Leinster	16	Murrayfield, Edinburgh
25 April 2009	(Ireland) Leinster	36	(Scotland) Glasgow Warriors	13	RDS Arena, Dublin
8 May 2009	(Ireland) Leinster	45	(Wales) Scarlets	8	RDS Arena, Dublin
16 May 2009	(Wales) Newport Gwent Dragons	18	(Ireland) Leinster	9	Rodney Parade, Newport

=== League table ===
	Team	Pld	W	D	L	PF	PA	PD	TF	TA	Try bonus	Losing bonus	Pts
1	(Ireland) Munster	18	14	0	4	405	257	+148	49	23	6	1	63
2	(Scotland) Edinburgh	18	11	0	7	416	296	+120	40	30	6	5	55
3	(Ireland) Leinster	18	11	1	6	401	270	+131	38	20	4	2	52
4	(Wales) Ospreys	18	11	0	7	397	319	+78	39	28	3	5	52
5	(Wales) Scarlets	18	9	0	9	376	395	−19	41	46	3	1	40
6	(Wales) Cardiff Blues	18	8	1	9	322	361	−39	31	36	2	2	38
7	(Scotland) Glasgow Warriors	18	7	0	11	349	375	−26	36	41	4	5	37
8	(Ireland) Ulster	18	7	0	11	298	331	−33	30	33	2	6	36
9	(Wales) Newport Gwent Dragons	18	7	0	11	305	429	−124	26	39	1	4	33
10	(Ireland) Connacht	18	4	0	14	224	460	−236	20	54	1	3	20
Correct as of 13 May 2009 MagnersLeague.com

== 2008/09 Heineken Cup Fixtures/Results ==
Round	Date	Home team	Score	Away team	Score	Venue
Round 1	11 October 2008	(Scotland) Edinburgh	16	(Ireland) Leinster	27	Murrayfield, Edinburgh
Round 2	17 October 2008	(Ireland) Leinster	41	(England) Wasps	11	RDS Arena, Dublin
Round 3	6 December 2008	(Ireland) Leinster	33	(France) Castres	3	RDS Arena, Dublin
Round 4	12 December 2008	(France) Castres	18	(Ireland) Leinster	15	Stade Pierre-Antoine, Castres
Round 5	17 January 2009	(England) Wasps	19	(Ireland) Leinster	12	Twickenham, London
Round 6	25 January 2009	(Ireland) Leinster	12	(Scotland) Edinburgh	3	RDS Arena, Dublin
Quarter-Final	12 April 2009	(England) Harlequins	5	(Ireland) Leinster	6	The Stoop, London (Report)
Semi-Final	2 May 2009	(Ireland) Munster	6	(Ireland) Leinster	25	Croke Park, Dublin (Report)
Final	23 May 2009	(England) Leicester	16	(Ireland) Leinster	19	Murrayfield, Edinburgh (Report)

=== Pool Table ===
Team	Pld	W	D	L	TF	PF	PA	+/−	BP	Pts
(Ireland) Leinster (6)	6	4	0	2	15	140	70	+70	4	20
(England) Wasps	6	4	0	2	9	114	112	+2	1	17
(Scotland) Edinburgh	6	2	0	4	8	91	103	−12	1	9
(France) Castres	6	2	0	4	6	73	133	−60	1	9

=== Knock-out stages ===
Quarter-finals
11 April – Millennium Stadium
(Wales) Cardiff Blues	9
(France) Toulouse	6
11 April – Walkers Stadium
(England) Leicester Tigers	20
(England) Bath	15
12 April – Thomond Park
(Ireland) Munster	43
(Wales) Ospreys	9
12 April – Twickenham Stoop
(England) Harlequins	5
(Ireland) Leinster	6

Semi-finals
3 May – Millennium Stadium
(Wales) Cardiff Blues	26 (6)
(England) Leicester Tigers (p)	26 (7)
2 May – Croke Park
(Ireland) Munster	6
(Ireland) Leinster	25

Final
23 May – Murrayfield
(England) Leicester Tigers	16
(Ireland) Leinster	19

== End-of-season awards ==
The Leinster Rugby Awards ceremony was held at the Burlington Hotel on 9 May 2009. The honours went to:

- Player of the year: Rocky Elsom
- Hall of Fame: Bill Mulcahy
- Young player of the year: Cian Healy
- Supporters' club Leinster Legend: Felipe Contepomi
- Wagamama Noodler of the Year: Paul O'Donohoe
- Try of the year: Gordon D'Arcy (vs Munster, May)
- Tackle of the year: Jamie Heaslip (vs Glasgow Warriors, April)
- Junior club player of the year: Bernard Smyth, Meath
- Club of the year: Coolmine RFC
- Ladies' player of the year: Grace Davitt, Blackrock
- School of the year: Terenure College
- Club public relations officer of the year: Seamie Briscoe, Boyne

== See also ==
- 2008–09 Celtic League
- 2008–09 Heineken Cup
- 2009 Heineken Cup Final
