= 2009–10 Leinster Rugby season =

Leinster Rugby
- 2009–10 season
- Manager: (Australia) Michael Cheika
- Captain: (Ireland) Leo Cullen
- Celtic League: Runners-up
- Heineken Cup: Semi-finalist
- British and Irish Cup: Quarter-finals
- Top try scorer: League: Shane Horgan (7) (Celtic League); Seán O'Brien (4) (Heineken Cup)
- Top points scorer: League: Isa Nacewa (142) (Celtic League); Johnny Sexton (138) (Heineken Cup)
- Highest home attendance: 20,000 vs Clermont Auvergne; 9 April 2010, RDS Arena
- Lowest home attendance: 11,836 vs Edinburgh; 9 May 2010
- Average home attendance: 16,601
Home colours	Away colours	Third colours

The 2009–10 Leinster Rugby season was Leinster's ninth competing in the Celtic League which they finished runners up in, alongside which they were competing in the 2009–10 Heineken Cup as defending champions until they were knocked out at the semi-finals by Stade Toulousain who went on to win the competition. Jamie Heaslip was player of the year.

== Squad ==
Note: Flags indicate national union under World Rugby eligibility rules. Players may hold more than one non-World Rugby nationality.

Player	Position	Union
John Fogarty	Hooker	Ireland
Jason Harris-Wright	Hooker	Ireland
Bernard Jackman	Hooker	Ireland
Richardt Strauss	Hooker	South Africa
Cian Healy	Prop	Ireland
Ronan McCormack	Prop	Ireland
Mike Ross	Prop	Ireland
CJ van der Linde	Prop	South Africa
Stan Wright	Prop	Cook Islands
Leo Cullen (c)	Lock	Ireland
Nathan Hines	Lock	Scotland
Trevor Hogan	Lock	Ireland
Malcolm O'Kelly	Lock	Ireland
Devin Toner	Lock	Ireland
Shane Jennings	Flanker	Ireland
Kevin McLaughlin	Flanker	Ireland
Seán O'Brien	Flanker	Ireland
Rhys Ruddock	Flanker	Ireland
Jamie Heaslip	Number 8	Ireland
Stephen Keogh	Number 8	Ireland

Player	Position	Union
Chris Keane	Scrum-half	Ireland
Paul O'Donohoe	Scrum-half	Ireland
Eoin Reddan	Scrum-half	Ireland
Shaun Berne	Fly-half	Australia
Johnny Sexton	Fly-half	Ireland
Gordon D'Arcy	Centre	Ireland
Fergus McFadden	Centre	Ireland
Brian O'Driscoll	Centre	Ireland
Eoin O'Malley	Centre	Ireland
Luke Fitzgerald	Wing	Ireland
Shane Horgan	Wing	Ireland
Simon Keogh	Wing	Ireland
Isa Nacewa	Wing	Fiji
Girvan Dempsey	Fullback	Ireland
Rob Kearney	Fullback	Ireland
Andrew Conway	Fullback	Ireland

=== Coaching and management team ===
Position	Name	Nationality
Head coach	Michael Cheika	Australia
Consultant Coach	Alan Gaffney	Australia
Backs Coach	Chris Whitaker	Australia
Forwards Coach	Jono Gibbes	New Zealand
Defence Coach	Kurt McQuilkin	New Zealand
Chief Executive	Mick Dawson	Ireland
Physiotherapist	James Allen	Ireland
Strength & Conditioning Coach	Jason Cowman	Ireland
Chief Scout	Guy Easterby	Ireland
Baggage Master	Patrick Moloi	Botswana

=== Transfers ===
==== In ====
Player	From	Source
Shaun Berne (Australia)	Bath Rugby (England)	RTE
Nathan Hines (Scotland)	USA Perpignan (France)	RTE
Eoin Reddan (Ireland)	London Wasps (England)	RTE
Mike Ross (Ireland)	NEC Harlequins (England)	RTE
Rhys Ruddock (Ireland)	Ospreys (Wales)	

==== Out ====
Player	To	Source
Felipe Contepomi (Argentina)	Toulon Rugby (France)	BBC
Rocky Elsom (Australia)	Brumbies (Australia)	RTE
Felix Jones (Ireland)	Munster Rugby (Ireland)	Magners League
Cameron Jowitt (New Zealand)	NSW Waratahs (Australia)	
Chris Whitaker (Australia)	Retired	

== Pre-Season Results ==
Date	Home team	Score	Away Team	Score	Venue
21 August 2009	(France) Rugby Nice	10	(Ireland) Leinster	38	Stade des Arboras, Nice
28 August 2009	(Ireland) Leinster	8	(England) London Irish	24	Donnybrook Stadium, Dublin

== 2009–10 Magners League Fixtures/Results ==
Key to colours
Magners League Semi-Final
Magners League Final

Date	Home team	Score	Away Team	Score	Venue
5 September 2009	(Wales) Scarlets	18	Leinster	16	Parc y Scarlets, Llanelli
12 September 2009	(Ireland) Leinster	23	(Wales) Newport Gwent Dragons	14	RDS Arena, Dublin
18 September 2009	(Wales) Ospreys	11	(Ireland) Leinster	18	Liberty Stadium, Swansea
26 September 2009	(Scotland) Edinburgh Rugby	19	(Ireland) Leinster	21	Murrayfield Stadium, Edinburgh
3 October 2009	(Ireland) Leinster	30	(Ireland) Munster	0	RDS Arena, Dublin
24 October 2009	(Ireland) Ulster	16	(Ireland) Leinster	14	Ravenhill Stadium, Belfast
31 October 2009	(Ireland) Leinster	23	(Wales) Cardiff Blues	6	RDS Arena, Dublin
6 December 2009	(Wales) Newport Gwent Dragons	30	(Ireland) Leinster	14	Rodney Parade, Newport
26 December 2009	(Ireland) Leinster	15	(Ireland) Ulster	3	RDS Arena, Dublin
20 February 2010	(Ireland) Leinster	27	(Wales) Scarlets	14	RDS Arena, Dublin
21 February 2010	(Wales) Cardiff Blues	20	Leinster	29	Cardiff City Stadium, Cardiff
18 March 2010	(Ireland) Leinster	20	(Scotland) Glasgow Warriors	14	RDS Arena, Dublin
27 March 2010	(Ireland) Leinster	17	(Ireland) Connacht	14	RDS Arena, Dublin
2 April 2010	(Ireland) Munster	15	(Ireland) Leinster	16	Thomond Park, Limerick
16 April 2010	(Ireland) Leinster	20	(Wales) Ospreys	16	RDS Arena, Dublin
21 April 2010	(Ireland) Connacht	27	(Ireland) Leinster	13	Galway Sportsgrounds, Galway
23 April 2010	(Scotland) Glasgow Warriors	30	(Ireland) Leinster	6	Firhill Stadium, Glasgow
7 May 2010	(Ireland) Leinster	37	(Scotland) Edinburgh Rugby	28	RDS Arena, Dublin
15 May 2010	(Ireland) Leinster	16	(Ireland) Munster	6	RDS Arena, Dublin
29 May 2010	(Ireland) Leinster	12	(Wales) Ospreys	17	RDS Arena, Dublin

=== League table ===
Key to colours
Top four teams advance to playoffs.

	Team	Pld	W	D	L	PF	PA	PD	TF	TA	Try bonus	Losing bonus	Pts
1	(Ireland) Leinster	18	13	0	5	359	295	+64	27	29	1	2	55
2	(Wales) Ospreys	18	11	1	6	384	298	+86	37	26	3	3	52
3	(Scotland) Glasgow Warriors	18	11	2	5	390	321	+69	31	24	2	1	51
4	(Ireland) Munster	18	9	0	9	319	282	+37	33	20	3	6	45
5	(Wales) Cardiff Blues	18	10	0	8	349	315	+34	33	28	2	2	44
6	(Scotland) Edinburgh	18	8	0	10	385	391	−6	40	40	4	5	41
7	(Wales) Newport Gwent Dragons	18	8	1	9	333	378	−45	32	37	3	2	39
8	(Ireland) Ulster	18	7	1	10	357	370	−13	39	35	4	2	36
9	(Wales) Scarlets	18	5	0	13	361	382	−21	35	35	1	8	29
10	(Ireland) Connacht	18	5	1	12	254	459	−205	20	53	0	4	26
Correct as of 9 May 2010 Table from Magners League official site

== Heineken Cup Fixtures/Results ==
Round	Date	Home team	Score	Away team	Score	Venue
Pool Stage	9 October 2009	(Ireland) Leinster	9	(England) London Irish	12	RDS Arena, Dublin
Pool Stage	17 October 2009	(France) CA Brive	13	(Ireland) Leinster	36	Stade Amédée-Domenech, Brive-la-Gaillarde
Pool Stage	12 December 2009	(Wales) Scarlets	7	(Ireland) Leinster	32	Parc y Scarlets, Pemberton
Pool Stage	19 December 2009	(Ireland) Leinster	39	(Wales) Scarlets	7	RDS Arena, Dublin
Pool Stage	16 January 2010	(Ireland) Leinster	27	(France) CA Brive	10	RDS Arena, Dublin
Pool Stage	23 January 2010	(England) London Irish	11	(Ireland) Leinster	11	Twickenham Stadium
Quarter Final	9 April 2010	(Ireland) Leinster	29	(France) Clermont Auvergne	28	RDS Arena, Dublin
Semi Final	1 May 2010	(France) Stade Toulousain	26	(Ireland) Leinster	16	Stade Municipal, Toulouse

=== Pool Table ===
Team	Pld	W	D	L	TF	PF	PA	+/−	BP	Pts
(Ireland) Leinster (4)	6	4	1	1	19	154	60	+94	4	22
(Wales) Scarlets (7)	6	4	0	2	12	116	147	−29	1	17
(England) London Irish	6	3	1	2	16	150	94	+36	3	17
(France) Brive	6	0	0	6	7	68	177	−109	1	1

=== Knock-out stage ===
Quarter-finals
10 April – Estadio Anoeta
(France) Biarritz	29
(Wales) Ospreys	28
10 April – Thomond Park
(Ireland) Munster	33
(England) Northampton	19
11 April – Stadium Municipal
(France) Toulouse	42
(France) Stade Français	16
9 April – RDS Arena
(Ireland) Leinster	29
(France) Clermont Auvergne	28

Semi-finals
2 May – Estadio Anoeta
(France) Biarritz	18
(Ireland) Munster	7
1 May – Stadium Municipal
(France) Toulouse	26
(Ireland) Leinster	16

Final
22 May – Stade de France
(France) Biarritz	19
(France) Toulouse	21

== End-of-season awards ==
The Leinster Rugby Awards ceremony was held in the Burlington Hotel, Dublin, on 21 May 2010. Winners were:

- Player of the year: Jamie Heaslip
- Hall of Fame: Paddy Madigan
- Try of the year: Gordon D'Arcy (vs Munster, 3 October)
- Tackle of the year: Isa Nacewa
- Young player of the year: Rhys Ruddock
- Club player of the year: Bevan Duffy
- School of the year: St Gerard's School, Bray
- Senior club of the year: St Mary's College RFC
- Junior club of the year: Seapoint RFC
- Ladies' player of the year: Tania Rosser
- Club public relations officer of the year: Jonny Stapleton, Clondalkin RFC
