= 2007–08 Leinster Rugby season =

Leinster Rugby
- 2007–08 season
- Manager: (Australia) Michael Cheika
- Captain: (Ireland) Brian O'Driscoll
- Celtic League: Champions
- Heineken Cup: Group Stage
- Top try scorer: All: Luke Fitzgerald (8)
- Top points scorer: All: Felipe Contepomi (191)
- Highest home attendance: 18,563 vs Leicester Tigers; 10 November 2007
- Lowest home attendance: 9,439 vs Llanelli Scarlets; 5 October 2007
- Average home attendance: 15,226
Home colours	Away colours	Third colours

The 2008-09 Leinster Rugby season was Leinster's seventh competing in the Celtic League alongside which they competed in the 2007–08 Heineken Cup. Though Leinster were eliminated early from the Heineken Cup, the season ended in celebration as 'the Lions' were crowned champions of the 2007–08 Celtic League. Home games were played in the RDS Arena, Dublin. Bernard Jackman was player of the year.

== Match attendance ==
Leinster's average Celtic League attendance was 14,361, the League's highest.

== Player transfers ==
=== Players in ===
- (Ireland) Leo Cullen from (England) Leicester Tigers
- (Argentina) Juan Gomez from (France) Stade Français
- (Ireland) Shane Jennings from (England) Leicester Tigers
- (Ireland) Chris Keane from (Ireland) Connacht
- (South Africa) Ollie Le Roux
- (South Africa) Stephen Knoop from (Ireland) Connacht

=== Players out ===
- (Australia) Adam Byrnes to (Australia) Sydney Fleet
- (Ireland) Reggie Corrigan (retired)
- (Ireland) Andrew Dunne to (Ireland) Connacht
- (Ireland) Guy Easterby (retired)
- (Australia) Owen Finegan to (England) Leicester Tigers
- (England) Will Green (retired)
- (Ireland) Stephen Grissing to (England) Rotherham Titans
- (Ireland) Denis Hickie (retired)
- (Ireland) Kieran Lewis to (Ireland) Munster
- (Ireland) John Lyne to (Ireland) Connacht
- (New Zealand) Fosi Pala'amo to (England) Leeds Carnegie
- (Ireland) Ciarán Potts (retired)
- (Ireland) Niall Ronan to (Ireland) Munster
- (Ireland) Robert Sweeney to (England) Rotherham Titans
- (South Africa) Harry Vermaas to (South Africa) Boland Cavaliers
- (Ireland) Johnny Wickham (released)

== Squad ==
Leinster Rugby squad
**Props**: (Argentina) Juan Gomez; (South Africa) Stephen Knoop; (South Africa) Ollie le Roux; (Ireland) Ronan McCormack; (Cook Islands) Stan Wright; **Hookers**: (Ireland) Brian Blaney; (Ireland) **Bernard Jackman**; **Locks**: (Ireland) Leo Cullen; (Ireland) Trevor Hogan; (New Zealand) Cameron Jowitt; (Ireland) Richie Leyden; (Ireland) **Malcolm O'Kelly**; (Ireland) Devin Toner	**Back row**: (Ireland) Des Dillon; (Ireland) **Keith Gleeson**; (Ireland) Jamie Heaslip; (Ireland) Shane Jennings; (Ireland) Stephen Keogh; (Ireland) Kevin McLaughlin; **Scrum-halves**: (Ireland) Chris Keane; (Australia) Chris Whitaker; (Ireland) Cillian Willis; **Fly-halves**: (Argentina) **Felipe Contepomi**; (Ireland) Johnny Sexton; (Australia) Christian Warner	**Centres**: (Australia) Michael Berne; (Ireland) **Gordon D'Arcy**; (Ireland) **Shane Horgan**; (Ireland) **Brian O'Driscoll**; **Wings**: (Ireland) Gary Brown; (Ireland) Luke Fitzgerald; **Fullbacks**: (Ireland) **Girvan Dempsey**; (Ireland) Rob Kearney; (Ireland) Ross McCarron
(c) denotes the team captain, **Bold** denotes internationally capped players.^{*} denotes players qualified to play for Ireland on residency or dual nationality.

=== Academy squad ===
==== Players in ====
- (Ireland) Jamie Hagan
- (Ireland) Cian Healy
- (Ireland) Felix Jones
- (Ireland) Ian Keatley
- (Ireland) Conor McInerney
- (Ireland) Shane Monahan
- (Ireland) Ruaidhrí Murphy
- (Ireland) Seán O'Brien
- (Ireland) Paul O'Donohoe
- (Ireland) Kevin Sheahan
- (Ireland) Richard Sweeney
- (South Africa) Kyle Tonetti

==== Players out ====
Academy squad
**Props**: (Ireland) Jamie Hagan; (Ireland) Cian Healy; (Ireland) Ruaidhrí Murphy; **Hookers**: (Ireland) Richard Sweeney; **Locks**: (Ireland) Conor McInerney	**Back row**: (Ireland) Seán O'Brien; (Ireland) Kevin Sheahan; **Scrum-halves**: (Ireland) Matt D’Arcy; (Ireland) Paul O'Donohoe; **Fly-halves**: (Ireland) Ian Keatley	**Centres**: (Ireland) Fergus McFadden; (South Africa) Kyle Tonetti; **Wings**: (Ireland) Fionn Carr; (Ireland) Shane Monahan; **Fullbacks**: (Ireland) Felix Jones

== Celtic League ==
=== Table ===
Team	Pld	W	D	L	PF	PA	PD	TF	TA	Try bonus	Losing bonus	Pts
(Ireland) Leinster	18	13	1	4	428	283	+145	44	30	4	3	61
(Wales) Cardiff Blues	18	12	0	6	395	315	+80	48	31	6	2	56
(Ireland) Munster	18	10	1	7	330	258	+72	33	26	2	4	48
(Scotland) Edinburgh	18	9	3	6	313	285	+28	35	29	3	3	48
(Scotland) Glasgow Warriors	18	10	1	7	340	349	−9	31	38	1	3	46
(Wales) Llanelli Scarlets	18	7	0	11	403	362	+41	45	38	6	5	39
(Wales) Ospreys	18	6	1	11	321	255	+66	24	24	2	9	37
(Wales) Newport Gwent Dragons	18	7	1	10	282	394	−112	31	44	1	3	34
(Ireland) Ulster	18	6	1	11	278	407	−129	33	41	2	1	29
(Ireland) Connacht	18	5	1	12	214	396	−182	16	39	0	2	24
Under the standard bonus point system, points are awarded as follows: 4 points for a win; 2 points for a draw; 1 bonus point for scoring 4 tries (or more) (Try bonus); 1 bonus point for losing by 7 points (or fewer) (Losing bonus)
Source: RaboDirect PRO12

=== Results ===
22 September 2007	Leinster (Ireland)	23–8	(Scotland) Edinburgh	Royal Dublin Society
17:30		Report		Attendance: 9,630

28 September 2007	Cardiff Blues (Wales)	19–30	(Ireland) Leinster	Cardiff Arms Park
19:30		Report		Attendance: 5,991

5 October 2007	Leinster (Ireland)	23–52	(Wales) Llanelli Scarlets	Royal Dublin Society
19:10		Report		Attendance: 9,439

12 October 2007	Glasgow Warriors (Scotland)	21–17	(Ireland) Leinster	Firhill Stadium
19:30		Report		Attendance: 1,580

26 October 2007	Ulster (Ireland)	16–16	(Ireland) Leinster	Ravenhill
19:30		Report		Attendance: 13,132

2 November 2007	Leinster (Ireland)	29–9	(Ireland) Connacht	Royal Dublin Society
19:30		Report		Attendance: 16,753

23 November 2007	Ospreys (Wales)	19–26	(Ireland) Leinster	Liberty Stadium
19:10		Report		Attendance: 6,097

30 November 2007	Munster (Ireland)	3–10	(Ireland) Leinster	Musgrave Park
19:30		Report		Attendance: 8,300

26 December 2007	Leinster (Ireland)	29–0	(Ireland) Ulster	Royal Dublin Society
15:00		Report		Attendance: 18,230

5 January 2008	Leinster (Ireland)	26–15	(Wales) Ospreys	Royal Dublin Society
19:30		Report		Attendance: 13,385

16 February 2008	Leinster (Ireland)	24–17	(Wales) Cardiff Blues	Royal Dublin Society
19:30		Report		Attendance: 14,322

29 February 2008	Connacht (Ireland)	10–16	(Ireland) Leinster	Sportsground
19:30		Report		Attendance: 3,851

21 March 2008	Leinster (Ireland)	34–18	(Scotland) Glasgow Warriors	Royal Dublin Society
19:30		Report		Attendance: 11,730

29 March 2008	Llanelli Scarlets (Wales)	10–24	(Ireland) Leinster	Stradey Park
17:30		Report		Attendance: 7,407

12 April 2008	Leinster (Ireland)	21–12	(Ireland) Munster	Royal Dublin Society
18:30		Report		Attendance: 18,500

18 April 2008	Edinburgh (Scotland)	15–13	(Ireland) Leinster	Murrayfield
19:30		Report		Attendance: 3,138

3 May 2008	Leinster (Ireland)	41–8	(Wales) Newport Gwent Dragons	Royal Dublin Society
18:00		Report		Attendance: 17,260

9 May 2008	Newport Gwent Dragons (Wales)	31–26	(Ireland) Leinster	Rodney Parade
19:10		Report		Attendance: 5,112

== Heineken Cup ==
=== Pool 6 ===
Team	P	W	D	L	Tries for	Tries against	Try diff	Points for	Points against	Points diff	TB	LB	Pts
(France) Toulouse (4)	6	4	0	2	13	7	+6	130	76	+54	2	2	20
(England) Leicester Tigers	6	3	0	3	10	5	+5	110	79	+31	1	1	14
(Ireland) Leinster	6	3	0	3	7	11	−4	95	123	−28	0	0	12
(Scotland) Edinburgh	6	2	0	4	8	15	−7	85	142	−57	0	1	9

10 November 2007	Leinster (Ireland)	22–9	(England) Leicester Tigers	RDS Arena, Dublin
13:30	Try: Horgan 53' c Con: Contepomi; Pen: Contepomi (5) 6', 19', 43', 51', 68'	Report	Pen: Goode (3) 7', 17', 65'	Attendance: 18,563; Referee: Christophe Berdos (France)

18 November 2007	Toulouse (France)	33–6	(Ireland) Leinster	Stade Ernest-Wallon, Toulouse
21:00	Tries: Poitrenaud 41' m Courrent 54' c Heymans 65' c Clerc 80+3' m Con: Courrent (2); Pen: Élissalde 22'; Courrent 48'; Drop: Courrent 34'	Report	Pen: Contepomi (2) 2', 36'	Attendance: 18,806; Referee: Chris White (England)

7 December 2007	Leinster (Ireland)	28–14	(Scotland) Edinburgh	RDS Arena, Dublin
15:00	Tries: Heaslip 15' c Gleeson 31' m Contepomi 71' c Con: Contepomi (2); Pen: Contepomi (3) 3', 28', 55'	Report	Try: Houston 46' m Pen: Godman (2) 5', 58'; D. Blair 63'	Attendance: 18,145; Referee: Romain Poite (France)

15 December 2007	Edinburgh (Scotland)	29–10	(Ireland) Leinster	Murrayfield, Edinburgh
15:30	Tries: Webster 33' c Cairns 54' c Con: Godman (2); Pen: Godman (4) 13', 18', 29', 78'; Drop: M. Blair 42'	Report	Try: Penalty try 40+6' c Con: Contepomi; Pen: Contepomi 4'	Attendance: 3,567; Referee: Tim Hayes (Wales)

12 January 2008	Leinster (Ireland)	20–13	(France) Toulouse	RDS Arena, Dublin
13:30	Tries: Fitzgerald (2) 32' c, 54' c Con: Contepomi (2); Pen: Contepomi 4'; Drop: Contepomi 80+4'	Report	Try: Donguy 69' c Con: Courrent; Pen: Courrent 40', 54'	Attendance: 16,752; Referee: Wayne Barnes (England)

19 January 2008	Leicester Tigers (England)	25–9	(Ireland) Leinster	Welford Road, Leicester
15:30	Tries: Deacon 20' m Rabeni 23' c Herring 75' c Con: Goode (2); Pen: Goode (2) 3', 54'	Report	Pen: Contepomi (3) 2', 7', 50'	Attendance: 17,033; Referee: Christophe Berdos (France)

== End-of-season awards ==
The Leinster Rugby Awards ceremony was held in Dublin on 25 April 2008. Winners were:

- Player of the year: Bernard Jackman
- Young player of the year: Luke Fitzgerald
- Try of the year: Jamie Heaslip
- Tackle of the year: Brian O'Driscoll
- Women's player of the year: Geri Healy, Blackrock College RFC
- Club of the year: Tullow RFC
- Club player of the year: Johnny Walsh, Seapoint RFC
- School of the year: C.B.C. Monkstown
- Club public relations officer of the year: Colm Brennan, Old Belvedere RFC
- Hall of Fame: Jack Kirwan, De La Salle Palmerston
- Special merit award: Keith Gleeson
