= Leinster Rugby =

Rugby union team in Ireland

(Republic of Ireland) Leinster Rugby
- Founded: 1879; 147 years ago
- Location: Dublin, Ireland
- Ground(s): RDS Arena (Capacity: 20,600); Aviva Stadium (Capacity: 51,700)
- Coach: Leo Cullen
- Captain: Caelan Doris
- Most appearances: Cian Healy (291)
- Top scorer: Johnny Sexton (1,646)
- Most tries: James Lowe (71)
- League: United Rugby Championship
- 2025–26: League: 2nd Play-offs: Champions; Irish Shield: Champions
1st kit	2nd kit	3rd kit

Official website
- www.leinsterrugby.ie
- Current season

Leinster Rugby (Irish: Rugbaí Laighean) is one of the four professional provincial club rugby union teams from the island of Ireland. They compete in the United Rugby Championship and the European Rugby Champions Cup. The team represents the Leinster Branch, one of the four provincial unions that together make up the Irish Rugby Football Union (IRFU), but is not restricted to players from that province.

Leinster play their home games primarily at the 20,600-capacity RDS Arena, 'the RDS' in Dublin. Larger fixtures are played in the 51,700-capacity Aviva Stadium when the capacity of the RDS is insufficient. Occasional one-off games have been moved to Croke Park, home of the Gaelic Athletic Association and by some distance the largest stadium in Ireland. Before moving to the RDS in 2005, Leinster's traditional home ground was Donnybrook Stadium, in Dublin 4. The province plays primarily in blue with white or yellow trim and the team crest features a harp within a rugby ball, the harp being an ancient symbol of the province found in and taken from the flag of Leinster, although the traditional colours of Leinster Rugby mean the design more resembles the flag of the president of Ireland or the coat of arms of Ireland.

Leinster turned professional along with its fellow Irish provinces in 1995 and has competed in the United Rugby Championship (formerly known as the Celtic League, Magners League and the Pro12 / Pro14) since it was founded in 2001. Before 1995, the Leinster Branch had previously competed in the annual Irish interprovincial championship.

During their professional history, Leinster have been the most successful team in Ireland or from the Celtic League and its successors. As of 2026, Leinster have won their domestic title on ten occasions, while topping the regular season table a further five times, and have won as of 2026 all four URC Irish Shields. In Europe, Leinster are second only to Toulouse with four European Champions Cups, one EPRC Challenge Cup and five runners-up placings in the Champions Cup.

Leinster enjoy historical rivalries with all three provincial unions, most notably with Munster, where some games between the teams have been watched by over 80,000 fans in Croke Park. In addition, Leinster have notable rivalries with two French club teams; erstwhile rivals Toulouse with whom they have jockeyed for the title of Europe's most decorated team, and La Rochelle, a frequent opponent in European competition who defeated Leinster in back to back European Champions Cup finals in 2022 and 2023 under the direction of long-time Munster player Ronan O'Gara. In more recent years a rivalry has also developed with the South African Bulls franchise, with the sides meeting twice in three seasons in the semi-final of the United Rugby Championship, before meeting twice in the finals of 2025 and 2026 United Rugby Championships.

== History ==
=== Founding (1879–1899) ===
The Leinster Branch was inaugurated at a meeting on 31 October 1879. The meeting was held at Lawrence's premises at 63 Grafton Street and was largely attended. Although this was the formal founding of Leinster as we know it today, with the amalgamation of the Irish Football Union and the Northern Union, the Leinster provincial team had been active since 1879 – when the first interprovincial derby was played against Ulster. The Leinster and Ulster teams also made up the representative Irish team that competed against England in Ireland's first-ever international in 1875. Upon the founding of the union, Munster were also added to the fray in 1879, when their first provincial team was selected and first Munster players represented Ireland.

F. Kennedy (Wanderers) was elected first Hon. Secretary of the Branch and C.B. Crocker (Lansdowne) first Hon. Treasurer.

The function of the Branch was to organise the game of rugby football in the province. Every year five representatives would be selected to join the IRFU Committee. They would be known as the "Leinster Five" and would pick the Leinster representative teams.

The first Interprovincial matches between Leinster, Ulster and Munster were held in 1875. At this time the matches were played with 20 players a side. Leinster lost to Ulster by a converted try and beat Munster by one goal to nil. Since then there has been a match between these teams annually, with Connacht joining the fold in 1885.

Leinster Schools Interprovincial matches have been taking place since 1888. Leinster Schools beat the Ulster Schools in Belfast on Saturday 7 April by a dropped goal to a try. Their first match against Munster Schools took place on 18 March 1899, when Leinster won by two tries to one.

=== Amateur period (1900–1990s) ===
The early 1920s led to the creation of the Provincial Towns Cup and the Metropolitan Cup, which are still hard-fought competitions in the Leinster Rugby calendar. Much has changed in rugby over the years, but the original idea of Leinster Club Rugby acting as a feeder for the Leinster Interprovincial side, though now professional, still stands true.

All Interprovincial matches were abandoned during the years of the Great War (1914–1918) and the War period (1939–1945), though unofficial matches were played.

The first major touring side to play Leinster was a team drawn from the New Zealand Army – the Kiwis, in 1946. Although it was not an official touring side organised by the New Zealand Rugby Union, the quality of the match, which was drawn 10 points each, is still remembered to this day.

The first official overseas touring side that came to play Leinster was an Australian touring side in 1957. Since then, Leinster has played against every major touring side from Fiji to France.

Before the days of professional rugby union, there was further emphasis on Irish club rugby as opposed to the provincial game. During these times the provincial sides were purely representative sides and games were far less frequent than now. Between 1946 and 2002 the sides would meet annually to contest the Irish Interprovincial Championship and on rare occasions would be tested against touring international sides. When rugby union was declared 'open' in 1995, these four teams became the four professional teams run by the Irish Rugby Football Union and therefore much of the history of the side has been made in the modern era.

=== Leinster Lions (1990s–2005) ===
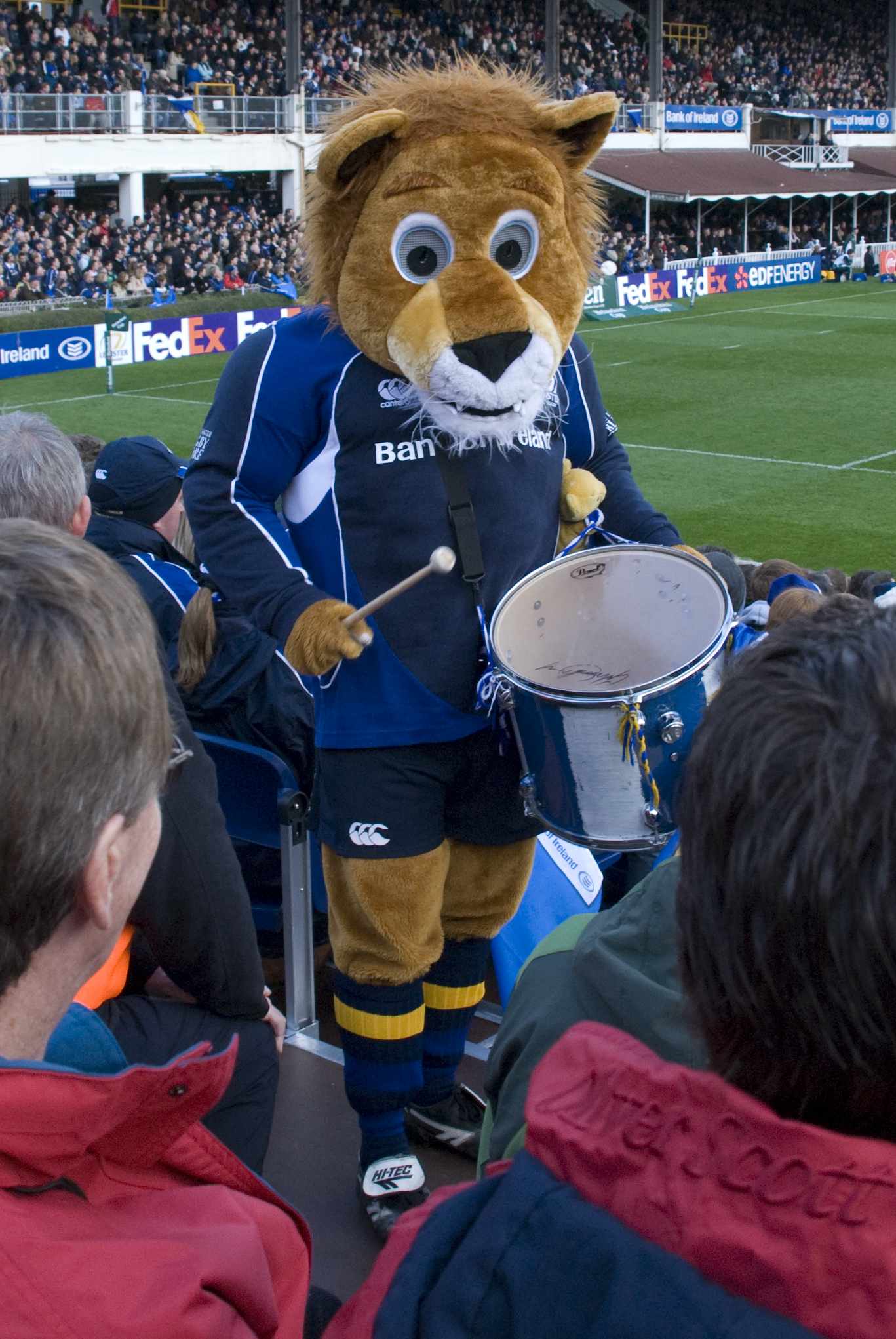
Leo the Leinster Lion, team mascot

Leinster became a professional outfit in the mid-1990s. The "Leinster Lions" name came into existence during the 2001–02 season as the result of a joint marketing initiative between Leinster Rugby and its kit sponsors, the Canterbury Clothing Company. Before the start of the 2004–05 season, the 'Lions' was dropped from the name. It is still used for marketing and branding, in particular, the Cubs Club for Junior members of Leinster Rugby. The Leinster mascot is "Leo the Lion". It was also during this time that the song “Molly Malone” became a match fixture to be sung by the fans.

Leinster's first season in the newly formed Celtic League ended in success as the Lions were crowned the inaugural champions, beating rivals Munster Rugby in the 2001–02 final. In 2002–03, they became only the third team in the history of the European Cup to win all their games in pool play. They also went one step further in the playoffs than the previous season by reaching the semi-finals (for the first time since 1995–96), but lost at home against French side Perpignan, which was accompanied by an unsuccessful season in the Celtic League. The 2003–04 season also ended in disappointment as Leinster slumped to their worst ever league performance and failed to qualify from their European Cup group.

=== Title misses (2004–2007) ===
Leinster improved during the 2004–05 season, finishing 3rd, just three points behind the eventual winners, the Ospreys. Leinster also won all of their pool games in that year's European Cup, and were again among the favourites for the title, however they went out at the quarter final stage to Leicester Tigers.

The next two seasons of the Celtic League were to end in near misses for Leinster, as they lost out on the 2005–06 and 2006–07 league titles on the final day of the season. These seasons also saw progress in the European Cup. In 2005–06, Leinster progressed to the semi-final but were eliminated by Irish rivals Munster at Lansdowne Road and they reached the quarter-final the following year where they were beaten by eventual winners London Wasps.

=== European and domestic dominance (2008–2014) ===
Increasing attendances at Leinster games led to a move across Dublin 4 from Donnybrook Stadium to the redeveloped RDS Arena.

In 2007–08, Leinster failed to qualify from their European Cup pool, but did end the season as Celtic League champions, sealing the title with a 41–8 victory over the Newport Gwent Dragons in front of their home fans at the RDS.

In the 2008–09 season, Leinster topped their European Cup pool despite away losses to French side Castres and English side Wasps. Victory over Harlequins in the quarter-finals followed, despite the Bloodgate Scandal. Leinster overcame Munster 25–6 in a semi-final in Dublin's Croke Park that broke the world record attendance for a club rugby union game with a crowd of over 82,200. Leinster won the 2009 European Cup Final in Murrayfield Stadium in Edinburgh, beating Leicester Tigers 19–16 to claim their first European crown.

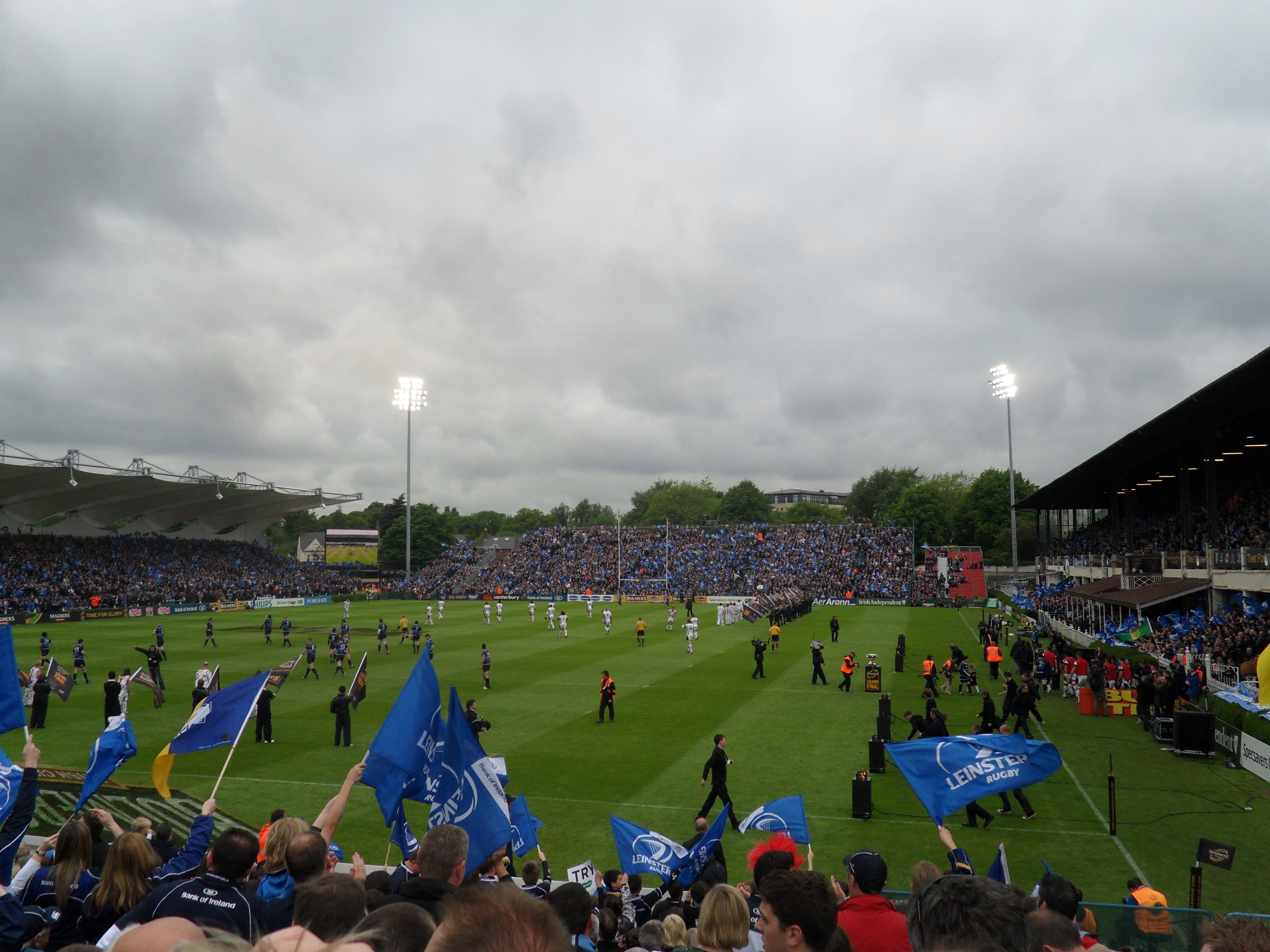
The RDS Arena before the 2010 Celtic League Final

In 2009–10 Leinster was eliminated from the European Cup at the semi-final stage by eventual winners Toulouse. Also despite having topped the Pro12 league during the regular season, Leinster lost the first-ever Play-off Final 17–12 on their home ground to the Ospreys.

In the 2010–11 European Cup, Leinster defeated the top English teams (Leicester Tigers, Saracens & Northampton Saints), as well as top French sides, Toulouse (who were the defending European champions), Racing Metro & Clermont Auvergne, (the French Champions). to go on to regain their title as champions of Europe in the 2011 European Cup Final at the Millennium Stadium in Cardiff. Trailing at half time, Leinster scored 27 unanswered points in the second half to beat Northampton 33–22 and claim their second European crown with the biggest comeback in European Cup final history. Leinster were also chasing a Pro12 & European Cup double, but lost 19–9 to Irish rivals Munster in the Pro12 Final.

In 2011–12 Leinster became only the second side ever to retain the title of European Champions. Leinster emerged unbeaten in group play to top their group and went on to defeat the Cardiff Blues 34–3 in the quarterfinals, followed by a 19–15 semifinal victory over ASM Clermont Auvergne. and defeated Ulster in the first all-Irish final 42–14, recording the most points scored and the most tries scored in a European Cup final as well as becoming the first unbeaten side to win the European Cup. Once again, Leinster targeted the double, and faced a repeat of the 2010 Pro12 final against the Ospreys. Leinster's domestic title challenge fell at the final hurdle, conceding a final minute try to slump to a one-point defeat, and unable to complete the double despite topping the table in the regular season.

The 2012–13 campaign proved to be another successful season for Leinster Rugby. The club finished in second place during the regular season of the Pro12 and defeated Glasgow Warriors by a score of 17–15 in their semi-final play-off match on 11 May 2013. On 17 May, Leinster were crowned champions of the European Challenge Cup after defeating Stade Français Paris 34–13 in the final at their home ground, the RDS Arena. Leinster successfully completed the double on 25 May, defeating Ulster 24–18 in the Pro12 final to claim their third league championship.

Leinster continued their success in the 2013–14 season by becoming the first team ever to defend the Pro12 title, topping the league in the regular season and defeating Glasgow Warriors 34–12 in their fifth consecutive Pro12 play-off final and also secured their seventh major title in as many years.

=== Blooding a new generation (2015–2017) ===
Following a remarkable run of seven major trophies in seven years, Leinster's title run came to an end following the 2013–14 season. The 2014–15 season saw a dip in form, with Leinster finishing in fifth place in the league and failing to make the play-offs. Fortunes in the newly formed Champions Cup were better, with the team reaching the semi-final where they were defeated in extra-time by eventual winners, Toulon. At the end of the season, head coach Matt O'Connor left the club by mutual consent with former club captain, Leo Cullen, being named as his replacement. Cullen then brought in ex-England coach Stuart Lancaster as senior coach at the start of the 2016–17 season, which saw a huge improvement from Leinster as well a big group of young players coming through. Despite playing brilliant rugby all season, Leinster failed to win any silverware, falling short in the Champions Cup semi-final to old rivals Clermont and shocked by the Scarlets in the Pro12 Semi-Final at the RDS. However, there was huge optimism amongst the players and supporters as they believed this was only the start of a new generation and perhaps another era of success.

=== Present Day (2018–2026) ===
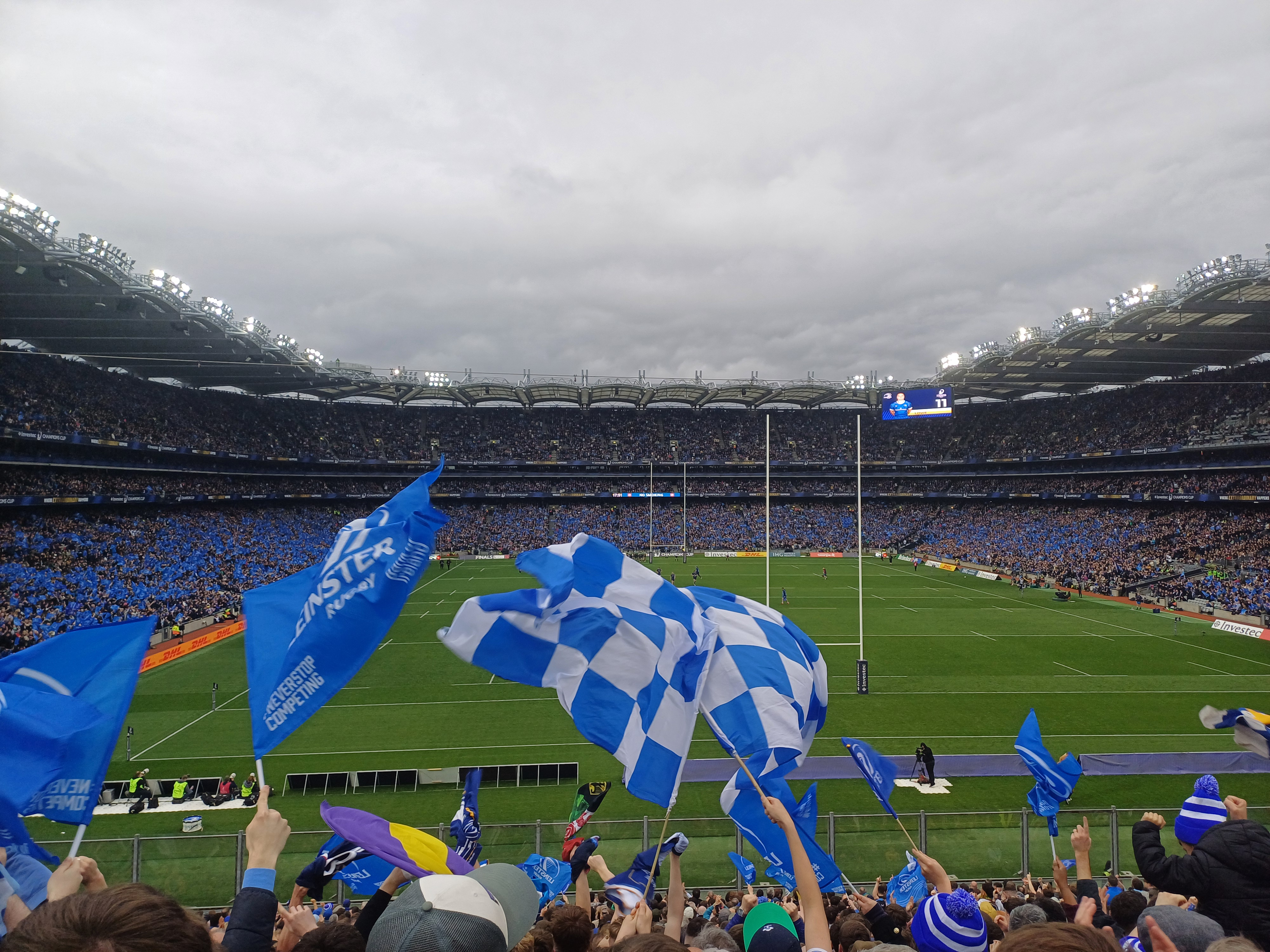
Croke Park before the 2023–24 European Rugby Champions Cup Semi-Final victory against Northampton Saints.

Starting with the 2017–18 season, Leinster won four straight Pro14 championships. In Europe, they won the 2017-18 Heineken Cup, defeating Racing 92 by a score of 15–12 in the final in Bilbao. They were runners-ups four times in 2018-19 Heineken Cup, 2021-22 Heineken Cup, 2022-23 Heineken Cup and the 2023-24 Heineken Cup. Leinster were knocked out of the Heineken cup competition in the quarter-finals in 2019–20, and again at the semi-finals stage in 2020–21.

Four South African teams joined the Guinness Pro 14 and the tournament was renamed the United Rugby Championship (URC).

Leinster lost to South African side the Bulls in the inaugural semi-final. In the subsequent two years, Leinster again lost at the URC semi-final stage to Munster, following a late drop goal by Jack Crowley, and the Bulls. They subsequently won the URC Grand Finals in 2025 and 2026.

In the Champions Cup during this period, Leinster were less successful making the final in three successive seasons, before losing in a semi-final to Northampton Saints in 2024–25. They reached the final again in 2025-26 but lost heavily to Bordeaux-Begles.

Their mentality has been routinely questioned during this period given their failure to win European trophies despite a relative abundance of resources.

== Previous season summaries ==
	Domestic League				European Cup		Domestic / 'A' Cup	
Season	Competition	Final Position (Pool)	Points	Play-offs	Competition	Performance	Competition	Performance
1995–96	No competition				Heineken Cup	Semi-final	Interprovincial Championship	Champions
1996–97	No competition				Heineken Cup	3rd in pool	Interprovincial Championship	2nd
1997–98	No competition				Heineken Cup	3rd in pool	Interprovincial Championship	Champions
1998–99	No competition				Heineken Cup	4th in pool	Interprovincial Championship	3rd
1999–00	No competition				Heineken Cup	2nd in pool	Interprovincial Championship	3rd
2000–01	No competition				Heineken Cup	2nd in pool	Interprovincial Championship	3rd
2001–02	Celtic League	1st (A)	21	Champions	Heineken Cup	Quarter-final	Interprovincial Championship	Champions
2002–03	Celtic League	5th (B)	18	Did Not qualify	Heineken Cup	Semi-final	No competition	
2003–04	Celtic League	8th	47	N/A	Heineken Cup	2nd in pool	Celtic Cup	Quarter-final
2004–05	Celtic League	3rd	57	N/A	Heineken Cup	Quarter-final	Celtic Cup	Semi-final
2005–06	Celtic League	2nd	74	N/A	Heineken Cup	Semi-final	No competition	
2006–07	Magners League	3rd	61	N/A	Heineken Cup	Quarter-final	No competition	
2007–08	Magners League	1st	61	Champions	Heineken Cup	3rd in pool	No competition	
2008–09	Magners League	3rd	52	N/A	Heineken Cup	Champions	No competition	
2009–10	Magners League	1st	55	Runner-up	Heineken Cup	Semi-final	British and Irish Cup	2nd in pool
2010–11	Magners League	2nd	70	Runner-up	Heineken Cup	Champions	British and Irish Cup	Quarter-final
2011–12	RaboDirect PRO12	1st	81	Runner-up	Heineken Cup	Champions	British and Irish Cup	Semi-final
2012–13	RaboDirect PRO12	2nd	78	Champions	Challenge Cup*	Champions	British and Irish Cup	Champions
2013–14	RaboDirect PRO12	1st	82	Champions	Heineken Cup	Quarter-final	British and Irish Cup	Champions
2014–15	Guinness PRO12	5th	62	Did Not qualify	Champions Cup	Semi-final	British and Irish Cup	Semi-final
2015–16	Guinness PRO12	1st	73	Runner-up	Champions Cup	4th in pool	British and Irish Cup	Quarter-final
2016–17	Guinness PRO12	2nd	85	Semi-Final	Champions Cup	Semi-final	British and Irish Cup	2nd in pool
2017–18	Guinness PRO14	1st (B)	70	Champions	Champions Cup	Champions	British and Irish Cup	Runner-up
2018–19	Guinness PRO14	1st (B)	76	Champions	Champions Cup	Runner-up	Celtic Cup	Champions
2019–20	Guinness PRO14	1st (A)	69	Champions	Champions Cup	Quarter-final	Celtic Cup	Champions
2020–21	Guinness PRO14	1st (A)	71	Champions	Champions Cup	Semi-final	Rainbow Cup	4th in pool
2021–22	United Rugby Championship	1st	67	Semi-final	Champions Cup	Runner-up	URC Irish Shield	Champions
2022–23	United Rugby Championship	1st	79	Semi-final	Champions Cup	Runner-up	URC Irish Shield	Champions
2023–24	United Rugby Championship	3rd	65	Semi-final	Champions Cup	Runner-up	URC Irish Shield	Champions
2024–25	United Rugby Championship	1st	76	Champions	Champions Cup	Semi-final	URC Irish Shield	Champions
2025–26	United Rugby Championship	2nd	63	Champions	Champions Cup	Runner-up	URC Irish Shield	Champions

Gold background denotes champions
Silver background denotes runner-up

* After dropping into the competition from the Champions Cup/Heineken Cup

=== Heineken Cup / Champions Cup ===
Season	Pool/Round	Pos	Played	Won	Drawn	Lost	Bonus	Points
1995–96	Pool C	1st	2	2	0	0	–	4
1995–96	Semi-final	Leinster 14 – 23 Cardiff						
1996–97	Pool B	3rd	4	2	0	2	–	4
1997–98	Pool A	3rd	6	2	0	4	–	4
1998–99	Pool A	4th	6	2	0	4	–	4
1999–00	Pool 1	2nd	6	4	0	2	–	8
2000–01	Pool 1	2nd	6	3	1	2	–	7
2001–02	Pool 6	1st	6	5	0	1	–	10
2001–02	Quarter-final	Leicester Tigers 29 – 18 Leinster						
2002–03	Pool 4	1st	6	6	0	0	–	12
2002–03	Quarter-final	Leinster 18 – 13 Biarritz Olympique						
2002–03	Semi-final	Leinster 14 – 21 USA Perpignan						
2003–04	Pool 3	2nd	6	4	0	2	2	18
2004–05	Pool 4	1st	6	6	0	0	2	26
2004–05	Quarter-final	Leinster 13 – 29 Leicester Tigers						
2005–06	Pool 5	2nd	6	4	0	2	6	22
2005–06	Quarter-final	Toulouse 35 – 41 Leinster						
2005–06	Semi-final	Leinster 6 – 30 Munster						
2006–07	Pool 2	1st	6	4	0	2	5	21
2006–07	Quarter-final	Wasps 35 – 13 Leinster						
2007–08	Pool 6	3rd	6	3	0	3	0	12
2008–09	Pool 2	1st	6	4	0	2	4	20
2008–09	Quarter-final	Harlequins 5 – 6 Leinster						
2008–09	Semi-final	Munster 6 – 25 Leinster						
2008–09	Final	Leinster 19 – 16 Leicester Tigers						
2009–10	Pool 6	1st	6	4	1	1	4	22
2009–10	Quarter-final	Leinster 29 – 28 ASM Clermont Auvergne						
2009–10	Semi-final	Toulouse 26 – 16 Leinster						
2010–11	Pool 2	1st	6	5	0	1	4	24
2010–11	Quarter-final	Leinster 17 – 10 Leicester Tigers						
2010–11	Semi-final	Leinster 32 – 23 Toulouse						
2010–11	Final	Leinster 33 – 22 Northampton Saints						
2011–12	Pool 3	1st	6	5	1	0	2	24
2011–12	Quarter-final	Leinster 34 – 3 Cardiff						
2011–12	Semi-final	ASM Clermont Auvergne 15 – 19 Leinster						
2011–12	Final	Leinster 42 – 14 Ulster						
2012–13	Pool 5	2nd	6	4	0	2	4	20
2013–14	Pool 1	1st	6	5	0	1	2	22
2013–14	Quarter-final	RC Toulon 29 – 14 Leinster						
2014–15	Pool 2	1st	6	4	1	1	2	20
2014–15	Quarter-final	Leinster 18 – 15 Bath						
2014–15	Semi-final	RC Toulon 25 – 20 Leinster (A.E.T.)						
2015–16	Pool 5	4th	6	1	0	5	2	6
2016–17	Pool 4	1st	6	4	1	1	5	23
2016–17	Quarter-final	Leinster 32 – 17 Wasps						
2016–17	Semi-final	ASM Clermont Auvergne 27 – 22 Leinster						
2017–18	Pool 3	1st	6	6	0	0	3	27
2017–18	Quarter-final	Leinster 30 — 19 Saracens						
2017–18	Semi-final	Leinster 38 – 16 Scarlets						
2017–18	Final	Leinster 15 – 12 Racing 92						
2018–19	Pool 1	1st	6	5	0	1	5	25
2018–19	Quarter-final	Leinster 21 – 18 Ulster						
2018–19	Semi-final	Leinster 30 – 12 Toulouse						
2018–19	Final	Saracens 20 – 10 Leinster						
2019–20	Pool 1	1st	6	6	0	0	4	28
2019–20	Quarter-final	Leinster 17 – 25 Saracens						
2020–21	Pool A	1st	2	2	0	0	2	10
2020–21	Round of 16	Leinster –Cancelled– RC Toulon (Note: Leinster awarded a walkover as Toulon were unable to field a team following positive COVID-19 test results in the squad)						
2020–21	Quarter-final	Exeter Chiefs 22 – 34 Leinster						
2020–21	Semi-final	La Rochelle 32 – 23 Leinster						
2021–22	Pool A	4th	4	3	0	1	3	15
2021–22	Round of 16	Connacht 21 – 26 Leinster; Leinster 56 – 20 Connacht						
2021–22	Quarter-final	Leicester Tigers 14 – 23 Leinster						
2021–22	Semi-final	Leinster 40 – 17 Stade Toulousain						
2021–22	Final	La Rochelle 24 – 21 Leinster						
2022–23	Pool A	1st	4	4	0	0	4	20
2022–23	Round of 16	Leinster 30 – 15 Ulster						
2022–23	Quarter-final	Leinster 55 – 24 Leicester Tigers						
2022–23	Semi-final	Leinster 41 – 22 Stade Toulousain						
2022–23	Final	La Rochelle 27 – 26 Leinster						
2023–24	Pool D	1st	4	4	0	0	3	19
2023–24	Round of 16	Leinster 36 – 22 Leicester Tigers						
2023–24	Quarter-final	Leinster 40 – 13 La Rochelle						
2023–24	Semi-final	Leinster 20 – 17 Northampton Saints						
2023–24	Final	Toulouse 31 – 22 Leinster						
2024–25	Pool 2	1st	4	4	0	0	2	18
2024–25	Round of 16	Leinster 62 – 0 Harlequins						
2024–25	Quarter-final	Leinster 52 – 0 Glasgow Warriors						
2024–25	Semi-final	Leinster 34 – 37 Northampton Saints						
2025–26	Pool 3	1st	4	4	0	0	2	18
2025–26	Round of 16	Leinster 49 – 31 Edinburgh						
2025–26	Quarter-final	Leinster 29 – 25 Sale Sharks						
2025–26	Semi-final	Leinster 29 – 25 Toulon						
2025–26	Final	Bordeaux Begles 41 – 19 Leinster						

=== Challenge Cup ===
Season	Round	Result
2012–13	Quarter-Final	Wasps 28 – 48 Leinster
2012–13	Semi-final	Leinster 44 – 16 Biarritz Olympique
2012–13	Final	Leinster 34 – 13 Stade Français Paris

=== United Rugby Championship ===
Season	Pos	Played	Won	Drawn	Lost	Bonus	Points
2001–02	1st (Pool A)	7	7	0	0	0	21
2001–02	Quarter-Final	Leinster 34 – 22 Newport					
2001–02	Semi-final	Leinster 35 – 13 Glasgow					
2001–02	Final	Leinster 24 – 20 Munster					
2002–03	5th (Pool B)	7	3	0	4	6	18
2003–04	8th	22	9	1	12	9	47
2004–05	3rd	20	12	1	7	7	57
2005–06	2nd	20	14	0	6	10	74 (Note: 11 teams were involved in this season, so one team did not play each week and were awarded 4 points instead. Therefore, each team finished the season with 8 more points than the table would seem to warrant.)
2006–07	3rd	20	12	1	7	11	61
2007–08	1st	18	13	1	4	7	61
2008–09	3rd	18	11	1	6	6	52
2009–10	1st	18	13	0	5	3	55
2009–10	Semi-final	Leinster 16 – 6 Munster					
2009–10	Final	Leinster 12 – 17 Ospreys					
2010–11	2nd	22	15	1	6	8	70
2010–11	Semi-final	Leinster 18 – 3 Ulster					
2010–11	Final	Munster 19 – 9 Leinster					
2011–12	1st	22	18	1	3	7	81
2011–12	Semi-final	Leinster 19 – 15 Glasgow					
2011–12	Final	Leinster 30 – 31 Ospreys					
2012–13	2nd	22	17	0	5	10	78
2012–13	Semi-final	Leinster 17 – 15 Glasgow					
2012–13	Final	Ulster 18 – 24 Leinster					
2013–14	1st	22	17	1	4	12	82
2013–14	Semi-final	Leinster 13 – 9 Ulster					
2013–14	Final	Leinster 34 – 12 Glasgow					
2014–15	5th	22	11	3	8	12	62
2015–16	1st	22	16	0	6	9	73
2015–16	Semi-final	Leinster 30 – 18 Ulster					
2015–16	Final	Leinster 10 – 20 Connacht					
2016–17	2nd	22	18	0	4	13	85
2016–17	Semi-final	Leinster 15 – 27 Scarlets					
2017-18	1st	21	14	1	6	12	70
2017-18	Semi-final	Leinster 16 – 15 Munster					
2017-18	Final	Leinster 40 – 32 Scarlets					
2018–19	1st	21	15	1	5	14	76
2018–19	Semi-final	Leinster 24 – 9 Munster					
2018–19	Final	Leinster 18 – 15 Glasgow					
2019–20	1st	15	15	0	0	9	69
2019–20	Semi-final	Leinster 13 — 3 Munster					
2019–20	Final	Leinster 27 — 5 Ulster					
2020–21	1st	16	14	0	2	15	71
2020–21	Final	Leinster 16 — 6 Munster					
2021–22	1st	18	13	0	5	15	67
2021–22	Quarter-final	Leinster 76 — 14 Glasgow Warriors					
2021–22	Semi-final	Leinster 26 — 27 Bulls					
2022–23	1st	18	16	1	1	13	79
2022–23	Quarter-final	Leinster 35 — 5 Sharks					
2022–23	Semi-final	Leinster 15 — 16 Munster					
2023–24	3rd	18	13	0	5	13	65
2023–24	Quarter-final	Leinster 43 — 20 Ulster					
2023–24	Semi-final	Bulls 25 – 20 Leinster					
2024–25	1st	18	16	0	2	12	76
2024–25	Quarter-final	Leinster 33–21 Scarlets					
2024–25	Semi-final	Leinster 37–19 Glasgow Warriors					
2024–25	Final	Leinster 32–7 Bulls					
2025–26	2nd	18	12	0	6	15	63
2025–26	Quarter-final	Leinster 59–10 Lions					
2025–26	Semi-final	Leinster 20–11 Stormers					
2025–26	Final	Leinster 36–7 Bulls					

== Current standings ==
=== United Rugby Championship ===
Final standings:

Pos	Team	Pld	W	D	L	PF	PA	PD	TF	TA	TB	LB	Pts	Qualification
1	Glasgow Warriors	18	13	0	5	479	338	+141	72	48	11	2	65	Qualification for the Champions Cup and knockout stage
2	Leinster (CH)	18	12	0	6	515	370	+145	77	51	13	2	63	Qualification for the Champions Cup and knockout stage
3	Stormers	18	12	1	5	504	344	+160	63	48	9	1	60	Qualification for the Champions Cup and knockout stage
4	Bulls (RU)	18	12	0	6	576	406	+170	82	59	10	1	59	Qualification for the Champions Cup and knockout stage
5	Munster	18	11	0	7	396	376	+20	59	51	8	3	55	Qualification for the Champions Cup and knockout stage
6	Cardiff	18	11	0	7	353	372	−19	52	52	7	4	55	Qualification for the Champions Cup and knockout stage
7	Lions	18	10	1	7	532	473	+59	73	70	9	3	54	Qualification for the Champions Cup and knockout stage
8	Connacht	18	10	0	8	442	395	+47	62	56	10	4	54	Qualification for the Champions Cup and knockout stage
9	Ulster	18	9	1	8	494	420	+74	72	60	10	4	52	Qualification for the Challenge Cup
10	Sharks	18	8	1	9	467	428	+39	71	57	9	3	46	Qualification for the Challenge Cup
11	Ospreys	18	7	2	9	376	454	−78	55	69	4	3	39	Qualification for the Challenge Cup
12	Edinburgh	18	7	0	11	362	439	−77	57	66	6	4	38	Qualification for the Challenge Cup
13	Benetton	18	6	2	10	327	493	−166	41	71	4	1	33	Qualification for the Challenge Cup
14	Scarlets	18	4	2	12	361	460	−99	52	63	3	5	28	Qualification for the Challenge Cup
15	Dragons	18	3	4	11	350	481	−131	46	71	4	4	28	Qualification for the Challenge Cup
16	Zebre	18	2	0	16	312	587	−275	43	85	3	4	15	Qualification for the Challenge Cup

Updated to match(es) played on 16 May 2026. Source: UnitedRugby.com
Rules for classification: Tiebreakers for teams tied on points: 1) Number of matches won 2) The difference between points for and points against 3) The number of tries scored 4) The most points scored 5) The difference between tries for and tries against 6) The fewest red cards received 7) The fewest yellow cards received.

2025–26 United Rugby Championship Regional Shield tables
(Ireland) Irish Shield
	Team	P	W	D	L	PF	PA	PD	TF	TA	TBP	LBP	Pts	Pos overall
1	(Ireland) Leinster (S)	6	5	0	1	166	120	+46	23	15	4	0	24	2
2	(Ireland) Munster	6	3	0	3	126	91	+35	16	15	2	1	15	5
3	(Ireland) Connacht	6	2	0	4	131	157	–27	18	21	2	2	12	8
4	(Ireland) Ulster	6	2	0	4	131	147	–16	18	22	1	2	11	9
(Italy) (Scotland) Italian x Scottish Shield
	Team	P	W	D	L	PF	PA	PD	TF	TA	TBP	LBP	Pts	Pos overall
1	(Scotland) Glasgow Warriors (S)	6	5	0	1	163	72	+91	25	9	4	1	25	1
2	(Scotland) Edinburgh	6	3	0	3	132	120	+12	20	17	3	1	16	12
3	(Italy) Benetton	6	3	0	3	98	141	–43	10	19	1	1	14	13
4	(Italy) Zebre Parma	6	1	0	5	130	190	–60	17	26	2	3	9	16
(South Africa) South African Shield
	Team	P	W	D	L	PF	PA	PD	TF	TA	TBP	LBP	Pts	Pos overall
1	(South Africa) Lions (S)	6	4	0	2	168	173	–5	21	25	2	1	19	7
2	(South Africa) Sharks	6	3	0	3	143	153	–10	21	19	3	1	16	10
3	(South Africa) Stormers	6	3	0	3	132	144	–12	16	19	2	0	14	3
4	(South Africa) Bulls	6	2	0	4	165	138	+27	24	19	3	1	12	4
(Wales) Welsh Shield
	Team	P	W	D	L	PF	PA	PD	TF	TA	TBP	LBP	Pts	Pos overall
1	(Wales) Ospreys (S)	6	4	1	1	145	117	+28	21	17	2	1	21	11
2	(Wales) Cardiff	6	4	0	2	137	135	+2	20	20	3	1	20	6
3	(Wales) Dragons	6	1	2	3	131	124	+7	17	19	2	3	13	15
4	(Wales) Scarlets	6	1	1	4	124	161	–37	19	21	2	3	11	14
If teams are level at any stage, tiebreakers are applied in the following order: 1. number of matches won 2. the difference between points for and points against 3. the number of tries scored 4. the most points scored 5. the difference between tries for and tries against 6. the fewest red cards received 7. the fewest yellow cards received
Green background indicates teams currently leading the regional shield. Upon the conclusion of the regular season, these teams win their respective regional shields. (S) : URC Shield champion

=== European Rugby Champions Cup ===
Pool C

European Rugby Champions Cup Pool 3
Pos	Team	Pld	W	D	L	PF	PA	PD	TF	TA	TB	LB	Pts	Qualification
1	(Ireland) Leinster (3)	4	4	0	0	115	80	+35	16	10	2	0	18	Home Champions Cup round of 16
2	(England) Harlequins (6)	4	3	0	1	184	86	+98	26	14	3	0	15	Home Champions Cup round of 16
3	(South Africa) Stormers (9)	4	3	0	1	117	125	−8	15	19	2	0	14	Away Champions Cup round of 16
4	(England) Leicester Tigers (16)	4	1	0	3	118	115	+3	17	15	2	0	6	Away Champions Cup round of 16
5	(France) La Rochelle (11CC)	4	1	0	3	101	114	−13	15	15	1	1	6	Away Challenge Cup round of 16
6	(France) Bayonne	4	0	0	4	58	173	−115	8	24	0	0	0	

Source: EPCR
Rules for classification: Tiebreakers for teams tied on points: 1) Number of matches won; 2) Difference between points for and against; 3) Total number of points for; 4) Aggregate number of points scored in matches between tied teams; 5) Number of matches won excluding the first match, then the second and so on until the tie is settled.

== Honours ==
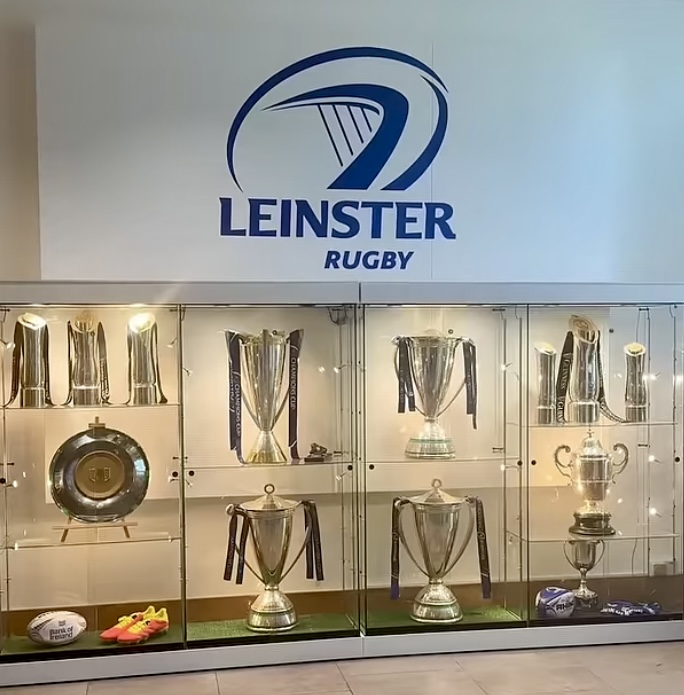
Leinster Trophy Cabinet - Top Left: 3 x Pro14, Middle Left: Irish Shield, Middle Section: 3 x Heineken Cup, 1 x Champions Cup, Top Right: 2 x Pro12 and 1 x Pro14, Middle Right: Celtic League, Bottom Right: Celtic Cup. Not pictured: Magners League (2008), Challenge Cup (2013), British & Irish Cup (2013 & 2014), URC (2025 & 2026)

Honours
Competition	Winners	Season(s)	Runners-up	Season(s)
European
European Rugby Champions Cup (Note: Formerly known as Heineken European Cup)	4	2008–09, 2010–11, 2011–12, 2017–18	5	2018–19, 2021–22, 2022–23, 2023–24, 2025–26
European Rugby Challenge Cup (Note: Formerly known as European Challenge Cup)	1	2012–13	-	-
Domestic
United Rugby Championship (Note: Formerly known as Celtic League / Magners League / Pro12 / Pro14)	10	2001–02, 2007–08, 2012–13, 2013–14, 2017–18, 2018–19, 2019–20, 2020–21, 2024–25, 2025–26	5	2005–06, 2009–10, 2010–11, 2011–12, 2015–16
Provincial
URC Irish Shield (Note: Contested from 2022 to present)	5	2021–22, 2022–23, 2023–24, 2024–25, 2025–26	-	-
Irish Inter-Provincial Championship (Note: Contested from 1946 to 2002 – Bold indicates Grand Slam; * indicates shared title; years shown are season ending years)	22	1949, 1950*, 1955*, 1957*, 1959, 1961, 1962, 1964, 1965*, 1972, 1973*, 1976*, 1978*, 1980, 1981, 1982, 1983*, 1984, 1994*, 1996, 1998*, 2002	N/A	N/A
'A'-Team
Celtic Cup (Note: Contested from 2019 to 2020)	2	2018–19, 2019–20	-	-
British & Irish Cup (Note: Contested from 2009 to 2018)	2	2012–13, 2013–14	1	2017–18

== Colours and crest ==
Flag of the province of Leinster

The current crest was introduced in 2005 as Leinster Rugby held no copyright on the previous crest. The new, stylised crest, is made specific to Leinster Rugby as it incorporates the harp with a rugby ball. The Leinster Rugby crest is on all official club merchandise including replica jerseys.

The province's current kit (2018/19) is blue with a pattern of spearheads on the jersey which takes inspiration from the people of Laighean (the ancient Irish name for Leinster), while the alternative kit is green with gold features, the colours seen in the Flag of Leinster, with a pattern of geographical cutouts for its 12 counties. The European kit is 'night navy' with the name of each of the 12 counties visible on the jersey written in the ancient Irish alphabet ogham.

The Leinster jersey also features four stars above the crest, to represent the four European Cup titles won to date.

== Stadia ==
=== RDS Arena ===
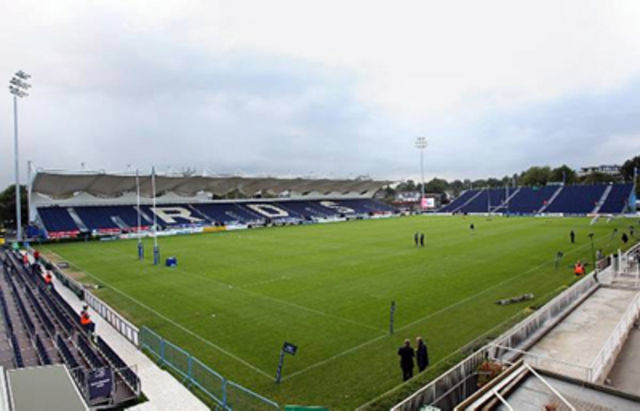
The RDS Arena

Leinster's current home ground is the RDS Arena. Games were first played at the RDS during the 2006–07 season, initially just for European Cup games. By the following season, however, all games had been moved to the RDS. The RDS has undergone large scale redevelopment since Leinster moved in. The arena now has a mostly seated capacity of 18,500. As the RDS remains a showjumping venue, the North and South stands are removable. A roof has been constructed to cover the grandstand opposite the pre-existing Anglesea stand. The RDS will be Leinster's home until 2027, as a 20-year lease was signed in 2007.

In July 2014, it was announced by the RDS and Leinster rugby that a design competition was being held to develop the arena into a 25,000 capacity world-class stadium, with work expected to commence on the redevelopment in April 2016. The selling of naming rights to the arena will be a key component in funding the project, with an initial budget of €20,000,000 being proposed.

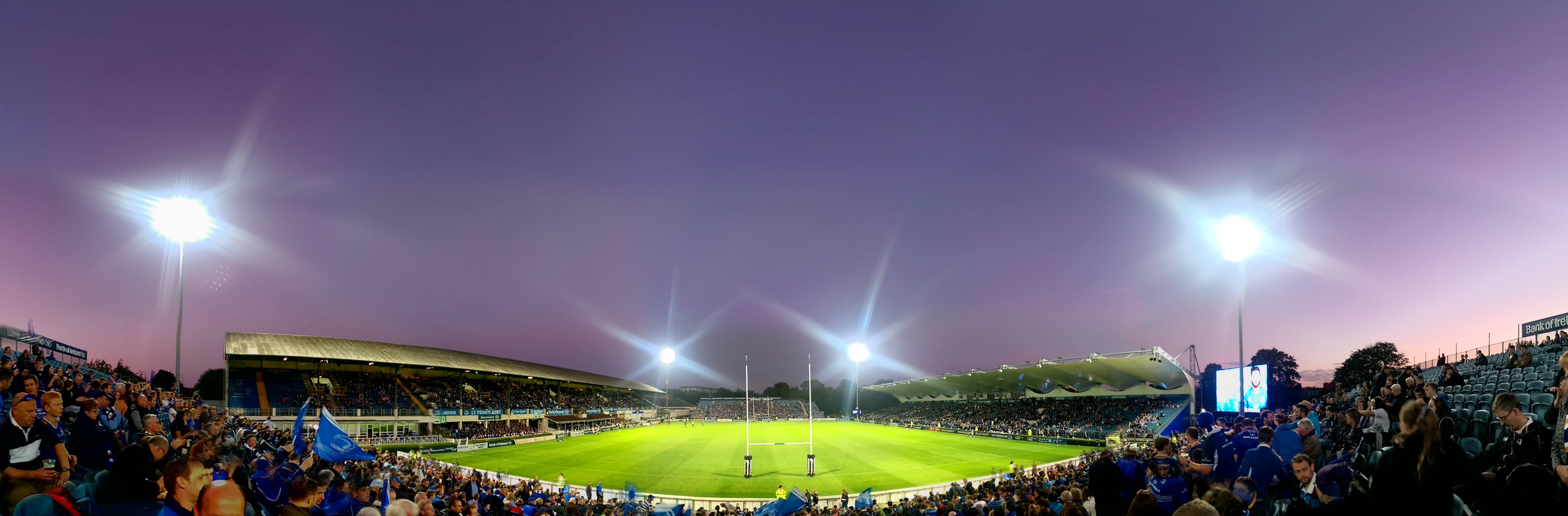
Inside the RDS Arena prior to a Leinster Game

=== Aviva Stadium ===
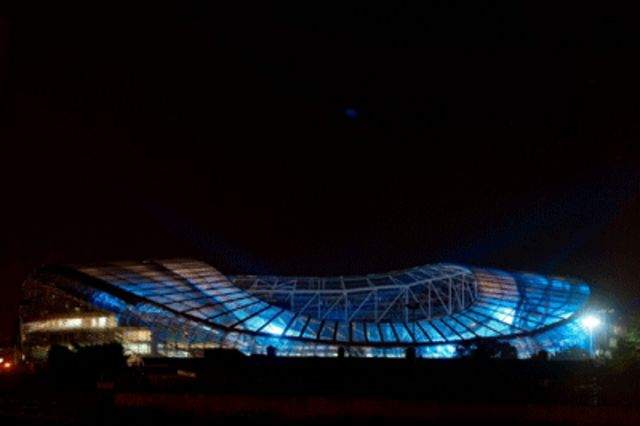
The Aviva Stadium prior to Leinster game

For bigger games where the RDS does not have sufficient capacity, Leinster play their games at the Aviva Stadium, which has an all-seater capacity of 51,700. These are often key home games in the European Cup or United Rugby Championship games against domestic rivals. In 2010 they first played a home league game against Munster, the first time the stadium sold out, and then against ASM Clermont Auvergne. Leinster defeated Leicester Tigers at the venue in the 2010–11 European Cup quarter-finals and went on to beat Toulouse in the semi-finals, also held at the Aviva stadium on 30 April 2011, en route to winning their second European Cup. The following season Leinster hosted Munster, Bath and Cardiff at the Aviva Stadium and remained unbeaten at the ground until December 2012 when they lost 21–28 to ASM Clermont Auvergne.

=== Donnybrook Stadium ===
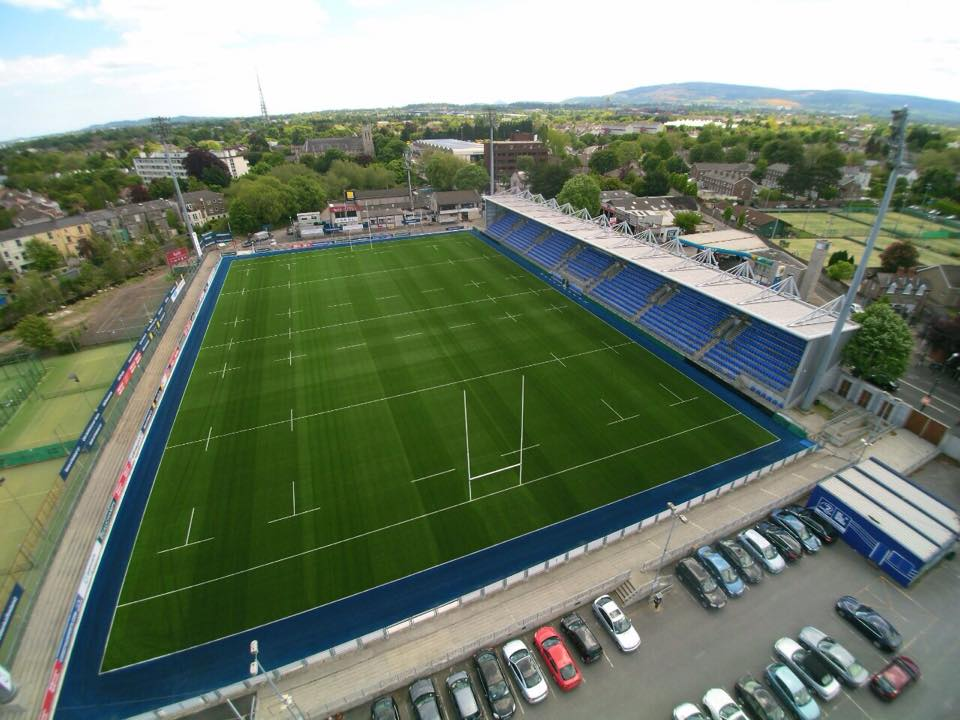
Donnybrook Stadium

Leinster's traditional home over the years has been Donnybrook Stadium in Donnybrook, Dublin 4. Donnybrook consists of a single covered stand and three sides of open terracing. A move across Dublin 4 to the RDS Arena for Leinster was needed to accommodate growing crowds, as the 6,000 capacity stadium had become too small. For this reason, Leinster have signed a long-term lease with the Royal Dublin Society to play home games at the RDS Arena. Donnybrook has since, been improved as a venue with the reconstruction of the grandstand in 2008 and remains an important venue for rugby union in Dublin. Due to limited space, it is unlikely that Donnybrook will undergo further redevelopment. Leinster A play their British and Irish Cup games in the stadium and the senior team have continued to hold certain pre-season friendlies in the stadium as well as most Leinster schools cup matches being held at the venue.

== Supporters ==
Before the advent of professionalism in the Irish game, provincial rugby games were generally poorly attended. During most of the 1990s, Leinster matches regularly attracted crowds of about 500 to 2,000. The decision to structure the game professionally via the provincial network through centralised player contracts and the subsequent on-field success achieved by Leinster and the other provinces resulted in a significant increase in support within a decade. Leinster had 3,700 season ticket holders in 2006, double the number of the previous season. The Official Leinster Supporters Club was formally established as a club in 2007. The last match at the old Lansdowne Road stadium was against Ulster on 31 December 2006 before it was demolished to make way for the new Aviva Stadium, earning the match the moniker of "The Last Stand". Leinster won the match 20–12, with an attendance of 48,000 – a record at the time. A previous attendance record in the Pro12 was also set at Lansdowne Road, for a game between Leinster and Munster which drew a crowd of 30,000. Leinster's supporters were named as 'Player of the Month' for April 2009 following their support in the European Cup Quarter Final against Harlequins at The Stoop.

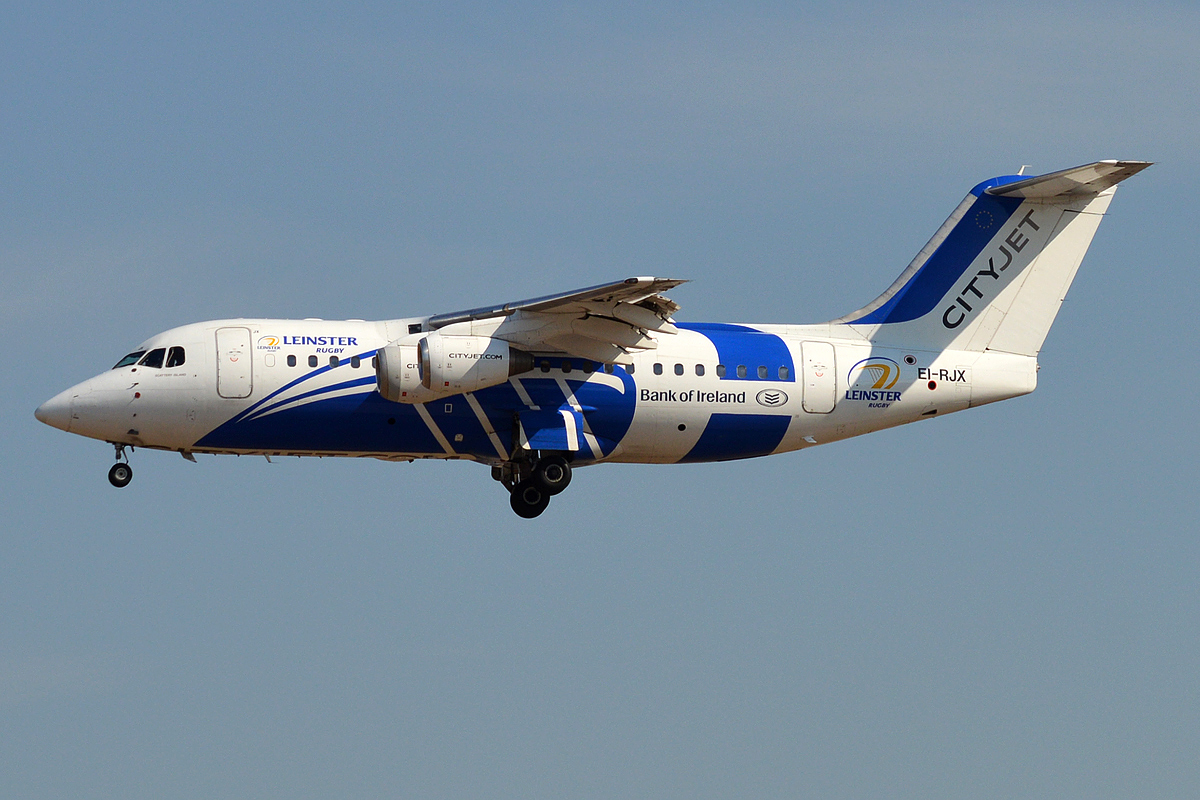
The Leinster Jet

On several occasions Leinster have set the record for the largest Celtic league and Pro12 attendances. On 2 October 2010, Leinster beat Munster 13–9 in the 5th round of the league at the Aviva Stadium. This set a new crowd attendance record for a Pro12 game at 50,645. They subsequently set a new record on 29 March 2014 during a sellout match against Munster in which 51,700 fans were in attendance. This Pro12 record was subsequently surpassed by attendances at the Judgement Day fixtures. During the 2014–15 Pro12 season Leinster had the best support of any club in the PRO12 league with an average attendance of 17,717.

Leinster's European Cup clash against Munster at Croke Park on 2 May 2009 set a world record attendance at the time for a club rugby union game with a crowd of 82,208.

== Home attendance ==
Domestic League					European Cup					Total	
League	Fixtures	Average Attendance	Highest	Lowest	League	Fixtures	Average Attendance	Highest	Lowest	Total Attendance	Average Attendance
–	–	–	–	–	1995–96 Heineken Cup	2	5,675	7,350	4,000	11,350	5,675
–	–	–	–	–	1996–97 Heineken Cup	2	3,750	4,000	3,500	7,500	3,750
–	–	–	–	–	1997–98 Heineken Cup	3	6,267	7,000	5,500	18,800	6,267
–	–	–	–	–	1998–99 Heineken Cup	3	5,500	8,000	4,000	16,500	5,500
–	–	–	–	–	1999–00 Heineken Cup	3	4,833	6,500	3,000	14,500	4,833
–	–	–	–	–	2000–01 Heineken Cup	3	8,147	12,000	3,940	24,440	8,147
2001–02 Celtic League	6•	8,926	30,000	3,056	2001–02 Heineken Cup	3	7,500	7,500	7,500	76,056	8,451
2002–03 Celtic League	3	5,500	6,000	4,500	2002–03 Heineken Cup	5	21,600	45,000	6,000	124,500	15,563
2003–04 Celtic League; Celtic Cup	12*	3,173	7,000	1,068	2003–04 Heineken Cup	3	14,963	23,463	7,200	82,965	5,531
2004–05 Celtic League; Celtic Cup	12*	5,038	13,500	2,800	2004–05 Heineken Cup	4	19,891	48,500	5,100	140,020	8,751
2005–06 Celtic League	10	5,814	14,135	1,700	2005–06 Heineken Cup	4	20,932	47,000	11,133	141,868	10,133
2006–07 Celtic League	10	11,892	48,000	3,750	2006–07 Heineken Cup	3	15,861	22,530	6,400	166,503	12,808
2007–08 Celtic League	9	14,361	18,500	9,439	2007–08 Heineken Cup	3	17,820	18,563	16,752	182,709	15,226
2008–09 Celtic League	9	14,728	18,500	10,910	2008–09 Heineken Cup	3	17,680	18,300	16,500	185,592	15,466
2009–10 Celtic League	11	15,835	19,750	11,836	2009–10 Heineken Cup	4	18,709	20,000	17,836	249,021	16,601
2010–11 Celtic League	12	16,849	50,645	9,790	2010–11 Heineken Cup	5	36,229	50,073	17,936	383,333	22,549
2011–12 Pro12	12	18,971	48,365	14,362	2011–12 Heineken Cup	4	33,282	50,340	17,924	360,780	22,549
2012–13 Pro12	12	19,084	46,280	13,235	2012–13 Heineken Cup; 2012–13 Challenge Cup	6†	22,369	48,964	9,654	363,222	20,179
2013–14 Pro12	13	19,507	51,700	14,400	2013–14 Heineken Cup	3	28,137	47,370	18,500	338,002	21,125
2014–15 Pro12	11	17,675	43,817	11,322	2014–15 European Rugby Champions Cup	3	29,509	43,958	17,558	282,952	20,211
2015–16 Pro12	12	15,118	43,108	8,612	2015–16 European Rugby Champions Cup	3	25,428	44,925	14,569	257,700	17,180
2016–17 Pro12	12	15,579	40,527	10,792	2016–17 European Rugby Champions Cup	4	30,081	50,266	13,890	307,272	19,205
2017–18 Pro14	11	16,793	46,374	10,115	2017–18 European Rugby Champions Cup	5	34,432	51,700	15,947	356,883	22,305
2018–19 Pro14	12	17,242	50,120	10,057	2018–19 European Rugby Champions Cup	5	34,285	51,700	18,055	378,329	22,255
2019–20 Pro14	7‡	12,919	18,300	7,967	2019–20 European Rugby Champions Cup	3‡	25,086	42,041	15,080	165,691	16,569
2020–21 Pro14; Pro14 Rainbow Cup	1‡	1,200	1,200	1,200	2020–21 European Rugby Champions Cup	0‡	–	–	–	1,200	1,200
2021–22 United Rugby Championship	11	14,138	32,411	8,559	2021–22 European Rugby Champions Cup	4‡	26,134	42,067	5,000	260,046	17,336
2022–23 United Rugby Championship	11	18,773	45,436	12,441	2022–23 European Rugby Champions Cup	6	39,377	51,711	15,469	442,765	26,045
2023–24 United Rugby Championship	10	18,939	49,246	10,404	2023–24 European Rugby Champions Cup	5	46,747	82,300	18,600	423,119	28,208
2024–25 United Rugby Championship	12	26,821	80,468	12,879	2024–25 European Rugby Champions Cup	5	38,923	55,627	22,400	510,774	30,046
2025–26 United Rugby Championship	12	21,206	51,859	9,493	2025–26 European Rugby Champions Cup	5	27,843	38,555	18,839	393,687	23,158
•Only matches in which there was a reported attendance are included.
*Match figures inclusive of both Celtic League and Celtic Cup fixtures.
†Match figures inclusive of both Heineken Cup and Challenge Cup fixtures.
‡Match figures include fixtures in which COVID-19 restrictions limited attendance, but exclude fixtures in which no spectators were allowed due to the COVID-19 pandemic.

Up to date at end of the 2024–25 season.

Key
	Record high
	Record low
*	Affected by the COVID-19 pandemic

== Leinster A ==
Leinster A is the team that represents Leinster in the British & Irish Cup, having won the competition a record two times to date, in the 2012–13 season as well as the 2013–14 season, also becoming the first and only side to ever successfully defend the trophy. Leinster A also compete in the All Ireland Inter-provincial Championship. Pre-professionalism and a formal Celtic league structure, the main Leinster team competed in the AIIPC. Since the advent of professionalism, the provinces have fielded lesser teams to concentrate on the Celtic League. The team is composed of Senior Leinster squad players requiring game time, Development contract & Academy players and, occasionally, AIL players called up from their clubs.

For the 2019–20 season, the Leinster A team was coached by Noel McNamara.

Competition	Played	Won	Drawn	Lost	% Won	Championships
British and Irish Cup	61	46	2	13	75.41%	2012–13, 2013–14
Celtic Cup	15	15	0	0	100.00%	2018–19, 2019–20
Total	76	61	2	13	80.26%	

Updated as of 12 April 2021.

== Sponsorship ==
=== Kit sponsor ===
From the 1999–2000 season until the 2017–18 season Leinster's kits were supplied by Canterbury of New Zealand having previously been supplied by O'Neills. For the next five seasons starting with the 2018–19 season Leinster's kits were supplied by Adidas. From the 2023–24 season, the kits are now supplied by Castore.

=== Main sponsor ===
Leinster's main shirt sponsor was ACC Bank from 1992 until the year 2000. Esat Digifone also featured on the back of the jerseys from 1997.

From 2001 to 2007 the main sponsor was Bank of Scotland (Ireland).

Since 2007 Bank of Ireland, the country's oldest banking institution are Leinster's primary sponsors appearing in the front of their shirt, their sleeves, the top back of their shirt and the front right of their shorts. The Bank of Ireland symbol appeared on Leinster's front right and front left collars. On occasion, the team will wear a shirt adorned with the logo of another sponsor due to a promotion run annually by the bank offering up the sponsorship space to an Irish business by way of a competition to win the right to become a sponsor for a day. During the 2013–14 season the contest was won by Dublin-based meat wholesaler Gahan Meats and for 2014–15 the shirt sponsorship winners were accounting software provider Big Red Cloud. The sponsorship prize package is valued at €50,000 and attracts hundreds of companies keen to be shortlisted each year. The left of Leinster's back shorts had Bank of Ireland between 2009 and 2013 where it was replaced by Bank of Ireland's Twitter address right up until 2015 where it was replaced by Laya Healthcare. For about a decade, the team's "official airline"' was Ireland's CityJet.

== Current squads ==
=== Leinster Men Management and Coaches ===
Position	Name	Nationality
Head coach	Leo Cullen	Ireland
Senior Coach	Jacques Nienaber	South Africa
Assistant coach	Robin McBryde	Wales
Backs Coach	Tyler Bleyendaal	New Zealand
Contact Skills Coach	Sean O'Brien	Ireland
Kicking Coach & Head Analyst	Emmet Farrell	Ireland

=== Leinster Men Squad ===
2026–27 Leinster Men squad
**Props**: (Ireland) **Jack Boyle**; (Ireland) **Tom Clarkson**; (Ireland) Peter Dooley; (Ireland) **Tadhg Furlong**; (Ireland) **Paddy McCarthy**; (Ireland) **Andrew Porter**; (Ireland) Niall Smyth; (Ireland) Alex Usanov; **Hookers**: (Ireland) **Rónan Kelleher**; (Ireland) **Gus McCarthy**; (Ireland) **Dan Sheehan**; (Ireland) Stephen Smyth; **Locks**: (Ireland) **Ryan Baird**; (Ireland) Brian Deeny; (Ireland) **Joe McCarthy**; (Ireland) Conor O'Tighearnaigh; (Ireland) **James Ryan**; (South Africa) **RG Snyman**	**Back row**: (Ireland) **Jack Conan**; (Ireland) James Culhane; (Ireland) **Max Deegan**; (Ireland) **Caelan Doris** **(c)**; (Ireland) Diarmuid Mangan; (Ireland) Scott Penny; (Ireland) Alex Soroka; (Ireland) **Josh van der Flier**; **Scrum-halves**: (Ireland) Cormac Foley; (Ireland) **Jamison Gibson-Park**; (Ireland) Fintan Gunne; **Fly-halves**: (Ireland) **Harry Byrne**; (Ireland) **Joey Carbery**; (Ireland) **Sam Prendergast**	**Centres**: (Ireland) Hugh Cooney; (Ireland) **Robbie Henshaw**; (Ireland) **Jamie Osborne**; (Ireland) **Garry Ringrose**; (Ireland) Charlie Tector; **Wings**: (Ireland) Joshua Kenny; (Ireland) **Jordan Larmour**; (Ireland) **Tommy O'Brien**; (Ireland) Andrew Osborne; **Fullbacks**: (Ireland) **Hugo Keenan**; (Ireland) **Jimmy O'Brien**
**(c)** denotes the team captain. **Bold** denotes internationally capped players. * denotes players qualified to play for Ireland on residency or dual nationality.^{ST} denotes a short-term signing. Taking into account signings and departures ahead of 2026–27 season as listed on List of 2026–27 United Rugby Championship transfers.

=== Leinster Men Academy Squad ===
2026–27 Leinster Men academy squad (22 members with Year stages)
**Props**: (Ireland) Sam Bishti (1); (Ireland) Max Doyle (1); (Ireland) Harry Goslin (1); (Ireland) Alex Mullan (2); (Ireland) Andrew Sparrow(3); **Hookers**: (Ireland) Lee Fitzpatrick (2); **Locks**: (Ireland) Dylan McNeice (1); (Ireland) Artur Smykovskiy (1); (Ireland) Alan Spicer (3)	**Back row**: (Ireland) Ben Blaney (1); (Ireland) Josh Ericson (2); (South Africa) Josh Neill * (2); **Scrum-halves**: (Ireland) Tadhg Brophy (2); (Ireland) Oliver Coffey (3); **Fly-halves**: (Austria) Caspar Gabriel (3)	**Centres**: (Ireland) Jack Deegan (2); (Ireland) Connor Fahy (2); (Ireland) Ciarán Mangan (2); **Wings**: (Ireland) Ruben Moloney (3); (Ireland) Charlie Molony (1); **Fullbacks**: (Ireland) Todd Lawlor (2); (Ireland) Hugo McLaughlin (3)

=== Leinster Women ===
2026/27 Leinster Women Squad
**Props**: (Ireland) **Linda Djougang**; (Ireland) Clodagh Dunne; (Ireland) Katie Layde; (Ireland) Caoimhe Molloy; (Ireland) **Aoife Moore**; (Ireland) Hannah Wilson; (Ireland) Hope Lowney; **Hookers**: (Ireland) Kelly Burke; (Ireland) Lisa Callan; (Ireland) Sara Delaney; (Ireland) Meabh Keegan; (Ireland) Kara Mulcahy; (Ireland) Emma Jane Wilson; **Locks**: (Ireland) Alma Atagamen; (Ireland) Ruth Campbell; (Ireland) **Kate Jordan**; (Ireland) Roisin Kinch; (Ireland) Anna Mai O'Brien; (Ireland) Jane Neill; (Ireland) Cliodhna Ní Chonchobhair	**Back Row**: (Ireland) Kathy Baker; (Ireland) Molly Byrne; (Ireland) Regan Casey; (Ireland) Aoife Corcoran; (Ireland) Katelynn Doran; (Ireland) Emma Kelly; (Ireland) **Erin King**; (Ireland) Rosie Searle; (Ireland) Ciara Short; (Ireland) Naoise Smyth; **Scrum-halves**: (Ireland) Emma Brogan; (Ireland) Jade Gaffney; (Ireland) Nikki Gibson; (Ireland) Aoibhe Kelly; (Ireland) Erin McConnell; (Ireland) **Katie Whelan**; **Fly-halves**: (Ireland) Nikki Caughey; (Ireland) Alex Connor; (Ireland) **Dannah O'Brien**; (Ireland) Ellie O'Sullivan-Sexton; (Ireland) Hannah Scanlan	**Centres**: (Ireland) Kathy Baker; (Ireland) Ella Durkan; (Ireland) **Vicky Elmes Kinlan**; (Ireland) Heidi Lyons; (Ireland) Cara Martin; (Ireland) **Aoife Dalton**; (Ireland) **Eve Higgins**; **Back Three**: (Ireland) Maggie Boylan; (Ireland) Katie Corrigan; (Ireland) Ciara Dunne; (Ireland) **Stacey Flood**; (Ireland) Caoimhe McCormack; (Ireland) Andrea Murphy; (Ireland) **Robyn O'Connor**; (Ireland) Emma Tilly
Players listed in **Bold** have represented their country internationally in Rugby Union or Sevens. *Denotes Devolepment Player|}

== Results versus representative sides ==
Scores and results list Leinster's points tally first.

Date	Opponent	Location	Result	Score	Notes
17 December 1902	Canada	Dublin	Won	13–6	Match Report
17 November 1945	New Zealand Kiwis (Note: Representative side consisting of New Zealand soldiers who completed military service in World War II. Much of the squad went on to represent the All Blacks.)	Lansdowne Road, Dublin	Drew	10–10	Details of Tour
27 November 1957	Australia	Lansdowne Road, Dublin	Lost	8–10	Match Programme; Match Ticket
1 February 1961	South Africa	Lansdowne Road, Dublin	Lost	5–12	Match Programme; Match Report
22 January 1964	New Zealand	Lansdowne Road, Dublin	Lost	8–11	Match Programme; Match Report
7 December 1966	Australia	Lansdowne Road, Dublin	Lost	3–9	Match Programme
15 November 1972	New Zealand	Lansdowne Road, Dublin	Lost	9–17	Match Programme
15 September 1973	Fiji	Lansdowne Road, Dublin	Won	30–9	Match Programme
13 November 1974	New Zealand	Lansdowne Road, Dublin	Lost	3–8	Match Programme; Match Highlights
21 October 1978	Argentina	Lansdowne Road, Dublin	Lost	13–24	Match Report
30 December 1979	Italy	Donnybrook, Dublin	Won	26–10	100 year anniversary
8 October 1980	Romania	Donnybrook, Dublin	Won	24–10	Match Programme; Match Report
8 November 1989	New Zealand	Lansdowne Road, Dublin	Lost	9–36	Match Programme; Match Report
17 October 1992	Australia	Lansdowne Road, Dublin	Lost	11–38	Match Programme; Match Report
12 November 1994	United States	Donnybrook, Dublin	Won	9–6	Match Programme
24 August 1999	Argentina	Donnybrook, Dublin	Lost	22–51	Match Report
24 August 2019	Canada	Tim Hortons Field, Hamilton	Won	38–35	Match Report
18 November 2022	Chile	Donnybrook Stadium, Dublin	Won	40–3	Match Report

== Records against European Cup and URC opponents in the professional era (1995–present) ==
Against	Played	Won	Drawn	Lost	% Won
(France) Agen	2	2	0	0	100.00%
(Italy) Aironi	4	4	0	0	100.00%
(Italy) Benetton	30	25	2	3	83.33%
(England) Bath	14	12	0	2	85.71%
(France) Bayonne	1	1	0	0	100%
(France) Biarritz	6	4	0	2	66.67%
(France) Bordeaux	3	1	0	2	33.33%
(Scotland) Border Reivers	10	7	0	3	70.00%
(France) Bourgoin	4	3	0	1	75.00%
(Wales) Bridgend	2	2	0	0	100.00%
(England) Bristol	3	3	0	0	100.00%
(France) Brive	2	2	0	0	100.00%
(South Africa) Bulls	8	4	0	4	50%
(Wales) Cardiff Blues	39	30	2	7	76.92%
(Wales) Cardiff RFC	1	1	0	0	100%
(France) Castres	8	6	1	1	75.00%
(Wales) Celtic Warriors	2	0	0	2	0.00%
(South Africa) Cheetahs	4	3	0	1	75%
(France) Clermont Auvergne	10	6	0	4	60%
(Ireland) Connacht*	49	40	0	9	81.63%
(Wales) Dragons	41	32	0	9	78.05%
(Wales) Ebbw Vale RFC	1	1	0	0	100.00%
(Scotland) Edinburgh	46	31	1	14	67.39%
(England) Exeter Chiefs	5	5	0	0	100.00%
(Scotland) Glasgow Warriors	59	40	2	17	67.8%
(England) Gloucester	4	3	0	1	75%
(England) Harlequins	5	4	0	1	80%
(France) La Rochelle	7	4	0	3	57.14%
(South Africa) Lions	6	5	0	1	83.33%
(England) Leicester Tigers	16	11	0	5	68.75%
(Wales) Llanelli RFC	1	1	0	0	100%
(England) London Irish	2	0	1	1	0.00%
(France) Lyon	2	2	0	0	100.00%
(France) Montpellier†	8	6	1	1	75%
(Ireland) Munster*	57	37	1	19	64.91%
(Italy) Milan	3	2	0	1	66.67%
(England) Newcastle Falcons	2	2	0	0	100.00%
(Wales) Newport RFC	4	4	0	0	100.00%
(England) Northampton Saints	12	10	0	2	83.33%
(Wales) Ospreys	44	28	3	13	63.64%
(France) Pau	1	1	0	0	100.00%
(France) Perpignan	1	0	0	1	0.00%
(Wales) Pontypridd RFC	2	2	0	0	100%
(France) Racing 92	5	5	0	0	100.00%
(England) Sale Sharks	4	3	0	1	75.00%
(England) Saracens	5	3	0	2	60.00%
(Wales) Scarlets	46	31	2	13	67.39%
(South Africa) Sharks	6	5	0	1	83.33%%
(South Africa) Southern Kings	3	3	0	0	100.00%
(France) Stade Français Paris	6	3	0	3	50.00%
(South Africa) Stormers	6	2	1	3	33.33%
(Wales) Swansea RFC	3	3	0	0	100.00%
(France) Toulon	5	1	0	4	20%
(France) Toulouse	15	8	0	7	53.33%
(Ireland) Ulster*	59	44	3	12	74.58%
(England) Wasps	11	6	1	4	54.55%
(Italy) Zebre	21	21	0	0	100%
Total	726	525	21	180	72.31%
*Matches played as part of the Irish Interprovincial Rugby Championship, separate from Celtic League fixtures, are not included in this table.
†Results do not include the cancelled Montpellier vs Leinster 2021-22 Heineken Cup fixture in which Montpellier were awarded a 28–0 victory due to positive Covid tests in the Leinster squad.

Correct as of 20 June 2026.

Since the inception of the Celtic league, Leinster have dominated their Irish provincial rivals Ulster, with a 44–12 win–loss record. Similarly, Leinster enjoy a 40–9 win–loss ratio against western province Connacht. Leinster also hold a 37–19 head-to-head advantage against arch-rivals Munster, in one of the most intense derbies in world rugby. Of the United Rugby Championship sides, Munster have the most competitive record against Leinster; all of the league's other sides, excluding South African clubs, have substantial losing records against Leinster. The Welsh side, Celtic Warriors competed in the Celtic league during the first couple of seasons and have a winning record against Leinster of two wins and zero defeats.

Among European teams, of those who have played at least four matches against Leinster, only RC Toulon enjoys a winning record. They have a commanding 4–1 head-to-head lead.

== Records against Irish Provinces (1946–present) ==
Against	Played	Won	Drawn	Lost	% Won
Connacht	109	86	4	19	78.9%
Munster	115	64	5	46	55.65%
Ulster	116	72	6	38	62.07%
Total	340	222	15	103	65.29%

Correct as of 19 April 2026.

== Notable players ==
See also Category:Leinster Rugby players.

=== Club captains ===
Professional era only

Captain	Season(s)	Championships/Notes
Kurt McQuilkin	1997–98	Interprovincial Championship: 1 (1998)
Gabriel Fulcher	1998–99	—
Liam Toland	1999–00 – 2000–01	—
Reggie Corrigan	2001–02 – 2004–05	United Rugby Championship: 1 (2002); Interprovincial Championship: 1 (2002)
Brian O'Driscoll	2005–06 – 2007–08	United Rugby Championship: 1 (2008)
Leo Cullen	2008–09 – 2013–14	European Cup: 3 (2009, 2011, 2012); Challenge Cup: 1 (2013); United Rugby Championship: 2 (2013, 2014)
Jamie Heaslip	2014–15	—
Kevin McLaughlin	2015	Retired mid-season due to injury
Isa Nacewa	2015–16 – 2017–18	European Cup: 1 (2018); United Rugby Championship: 1 (2018)
Johnny Sexton	2018–19 – 2022–23	United Rugby Championship: 3 (2019, 2020, 2021); Irish Shield: 2 (2022, 2023)
James Ryan; Garry Ringrose	2023–24	Irish Shield: 1 (2024)
Caelan Doris	2024–25 –	United Rugby Championship: 2 (2025, 2026); Irish Shield: 2 (2025, 2026)

=== British & Irish Lions ===
The following Leinster players have also represented the British & Irish Lions. Bold indicates tour captain.

Year	Tour	Series Result	Players
1888	New Zealand; Australia	No Test	—
1891	South Africa	3–0	—
1896	South Africa	3–1	**Thomas Crean**; Robert Johnston
1899	Australia	3–1	—
1903	South Africa	0–1–0	—
1904	(Australia) Australia; New Zealand	3–0; 0–1	—
1908	(New Zealand) New Zealand; Australia	0–2–1; No Test	—
1910	South Africa	1–2	—
1910	Argentina	1–0	—
1924	South Africa	0–3–1	—
1927	Argentina	4–0	—
1930	(New Zealand) New Zealand; Australia	1–3; 0–1	—
1936	Argentina	1–0	—
1938	South Africa	1–2	George J. Morgan
1950	(New Zealand) New Zealand; Australia	0–3–1; 2–0	**Karl Mullen**
1955	South Africa	2–2	Tony O'Reilly; Robin Roe
1959	(Australia) Australia; New Zealand	2–0; 1–3	Niall Brophy; **Ronnie Dawson**; Bill Mulcahy; Tony O'Reilly (2)
1962	South Africa	0–3–1	Niall Brophy (2); Bill Mulcahy (2)
1966	(Australia) Australia; New Zealand	2–0; 0–4	—
1968	South Africa	0–3–1	Ronnie Dawson (2)
1971	New Zealand	2–1–1	Mike Hipwell; Sean Lynch; Fergus Slattery
1974	South Africa	3–0–1	Tom Grace; John Moloney; Fergus Slattery (2)
1977	New Zealand	1–3	Willie Duggan; Philip Orr
1980	South Africa	1–3	Ollie Campbell; Rodney O'Donnell; Philip Orr (2); John Robbie; Tony Ward
1983	New Zealand	0–4	Ollie Campbell (2); Hugo MacNeill
1989	Australia	2–1	Paul Dean; Brendan Mullin
1993	New Zealand	1–2	Vince Cunningham; Nick Popplewell
1997	South Africa	2–1	Eric Miller
2001	Australia	1–2	Brian O'Driscoll; Malcolm O'Kelly
2005	New Zealand	0–3	Shane Byrne; Gordon D'Arcy; Denis Hickie; Shane Horgan; **Brian O'Driscoll** (2); Malcolm O'Kelly (2)
2009	South Africa	1–2	Gordon D'Arcy (2); Luke Fitzgerald; Jamie Heaslip; Rob Kearney; Brian O'Driscoll (3)
2013	Australia	2–1	Cian Healy; Jamie Heaslip (2); Rob Kearney (2); Seán O'Brien; Brian O'Driscoll (4); Johnny Sexton
2017	New Zealand	1–1–1	Tadhg Furlong; Robbie Henshaw; Jack McGrath; Seán O'Brien (2); Johnny Sexton (2)
2021	South Africa	1–2	Jack Conan; Tadhg Furlong (2); Robbie Henshaw (2); Ronan Kelleher; Andrew Porter
2025	Australia	2–1	Tom Clarkson; Jack Conan (2); Tadhg Furlong (3); Jamison Gibson-Park; Hugo Keenan; Ronan Kelleher (2); James Lowe; Joe McCarthy; Jamie Osborne; Andrew Porter (2); Garry Ringrose; James Ryan; Dan Sheehan; Josh van der Flier

=== Notable overseas players ===
The following is a list of non-Irish qualified representative Leinster players:

Nation	Player	Season(s)
Argentina	Felipe Contepomi	2003/04 – 2008/09
Argentina	Mariano Galarza	2010
Argentina	Juan Gomez	2007/08 – 2008/09
Australia	Shaun Berne	2009/10 – 2010/11
Australia	Adam Byrnes	2005/06
Australia	Kane Douglas	2014/15
Australia	Rocky Elsom	2008/09
Australia	Scott Fardy	2017/18 – 2020/21
Australia	Owen Finegan*	2006/07
Australia	Joe Tomane	2018/19 – 2019/20
Australia	Chris Whitaker*	2006/07 – 2008/09
Cook Islands	Stan Wright	2006/07 – 2010/11
England	Will Green	2005/06 – 2006/07
Fiji	Isa Nacewa	2008/09 – 2012/13; 2015/16 – 2017/18
France	Rabah Slimani	2024/25 – present
(Georgia (country)) Georgia	Vakh Abdaladze	2017/18 – 2022/23
New Zealand	Jordie Barrett	2025/26
New Zealand	Matt Berquist	2011/12
New Zealand	Jimmy Gopperth	2013/14 – 2014/15
New Zealand	David Holwell	2005, 2008
New Zealand	Charlie Ngatai	2022/23 – 2023/24
New Zealand	Ben Te'o†	2014/15 – 2015/16
New Zealand	Brad Thorn*	2012
Russia	Vasily Artemiev	2006/07
Russia	Adam Byrnes	2005/06
Samoa	Michael Alaalatoa	2021/22 – 2023/24
Samoa	Fosi Pala'amo	2006/07
Scotland	Nathan Hines	2009/10 – 2010/11
South Africa	Jason Jenkins	2022/23 – 2023/24
South Africa	Zane Kirchner	2013/14 – 2016/17
South Africa	Ollie Le Roux	2007/08
South Africa	RG Snyman*	2024/25 - Present
South Africa	CJ van der Linde*	2008/09 – 2009/10
South Africa	Heinke van der Merwe*	2010/11 – 2012/13
* indicates World Cup winners
† Ben Te'o subsequently represented England at international level

== Head coaches (professional era) ==
As of 20 June 2026 (Note: Original research sourced from http://www.leinsterrugby.ie/team/results/index.php)

Coach	Season(s)	GP*	W	D	L	Win %	Loss %	Championships / Notes
(Ireland) Jim Glennon†	1995/96 – 1996/97	14	9	0	5	64.29%	35.71%	Interprovincial Championship (1996)
(Wales) Mike Ruddock	1997/98 – 1999/00	34	16	0	18	47.06%	52.94%	Interprovincial Championship (1998)
(Australia) Matt Willams	2000/01 – 2002/03	46	31	3	12	67.39%	26.09%	United Rugby Championship (2002); Interprovincial Championship (2002)
(Australia) Gary Ella	2003/04	30	14	2	14	46.7%	46.7%	
(Ireland) Declan Kidney	2004/05	26	17	1	8	65.38%	30.77%	
(Ireland) Gerry Murphy	2004/05	3	2	0	1	66.67%	33.33%	Interim Coach
(Australia) Michael Cheika	2005/06 – 2009/10	134	88	4	42	65.67%	31.34%	European Cup (2009); United Rugby Championship (2008)
(New Zealand) Joe Schmidt	2010/11 – 2012/13	99	77	3	19	77.78%	19.19%	European Cup (2011, 2012); European Challenge Cup (2013); United Rugby Championship (2013)
(Australia) Matt O'Connor	2013/14 – 2014/15	61	40	5	16	65.57%	26.23%	United Rugby Championship (2014)
(Ireland) Leo Cullen	2015/16 – present	317	249	4	64	78.55%	20.19%	European Cup (2018); United Rugby Championship (2018, 2019, 2020, 2021, 2025, 2026); United Rugby Championship Coach of the year (2018, 2022); Irish Shield (2022, 2023, 2024, 2025, 2026)
Total	1995 – present	763	542	22	199	71.04%	26.08%	
^{*}Games played are inclusive of matches played against touring international sides, but do not include friendlies against club opposition.
†Glennon was the Leinster head coach for two separate spells between 1992 and 1998, but only matches during the professional era are included in this table.

== Personnel honours and records ==
(correct as of 16 May 2026)

Bold indicates active player

Most tries
Rank	Player	Tries
1	James Lowe	71
2	Shane Horgan	69
3	Brian O'Driscoll	61
4	Gordon D'Arcy	60
5	Denis Hickie	56
5	Luke McGrath	56
7	Dave Kearney	55
8	**Dan Sheehan**	53
9	**Jordan Larmour**	52
10	**Garry Ringrose**	48

Most appearances
Rank	Player	Apps
1	Cian Healy	291
2	Devin Toner	280
3	Gordon D'Arcy	257
3	Luke McGrath	257
5	Jamie Heaslip	229
5	Rhys Ruddock	229
7	Leo Cullen	219
7	Rob Kearney	219
9	Seán Cronin	206
10	Shane Jennings	205

Most points
Rank	Player	Points
1	Johnny Sexton	1,646
2	Felipe Contepomi	1,225
3	Ross Byrne	1,196
4	Ian Madigan	827
5	Isa Nacewa	706
6	Brian O'Meara	553
7	**Harry Byrne**	457
8	Fergus McFadden	444
9	Alan McGowan	372
10	James Lowe	355

=== World Rugby Player of the Year ===
Inaugurated 2001

Season	Nominated	Winner
2001	Brian O'Driscoll	—
2002	Brian O'Driscoll (2)	—
2004	Gordon D'Arcy	—
2007	Felipe Contepomi	—
2009	Jamie Heaslip, Brian O'Driscoll (3)	—
2014	Johnny Sexton	—
2016	Jamie Heaslip (2)	—
2018	Johnny Sexton (2)	**Johnny Sexton**
2022	Johnny Sexton (3), Josh van der Flier	**Josh van der Flier**
2024	Caelan Doris	—

=== World Rugby Breakthrough Player of the Year ===
Inaugurated 2015

Nominated (3 nominees per year)

Season	Nominated	Winner
2018	Jordan Larmour	—
2022	Dan Sheehan	—

=== World Rugby Junior Player of the Year ===
Inaugurated 2008 - awarded to World Rugby Under 20 Championship player of the tournament

Season	Nominated	Winner
2014	Garry Ringrose	—
2016	Max Deegan	**Max Deegan**

=== Europe ===
All players listed below are Irish unless otherwise noted.

ERC European Dream Team
The following Leinster players were selected in the ERC European Dream Team, an all-time dream team of Heineken Cup players over the first 15 years of professional European rugby. (1995–2010). Both O'Driscoll and Elsom were part of the 2008–09 Heineken Cup winning team.

Season(s)	Player	Position
2008–2009	(Australia) Rocky Elsom*	Flanker
1999–2014	Brian O'Driscoll	Centre

* Elsom had the fewest Heineken Cup appearances in the team and was the only member born outside of Europe

European Player of the Year

Awarded annually since 2010-11

Season	Nominated	Winner
2010–11	Seán O'Brien, Jamie Heaslip, (Fiji) Isa Nacewa	**Seán O'Brien**
2011–12	Rob Kearney, Johnny Sexton	**Rob Kearney**
2012–13	Jamie Heaslip (2)	—
2013–14	—	—
2014–15	Jamie Heaslip (3)	—
2015–16	—	—
2016–17	Garry Ringrose	—
2017–18	(Australia) Scott Fardy, Tadhg Furlong, Johnny Sexton (2)	—
2018–19	Seán Cronin, Tadhg Furlong (2), Garry Ringrose (2)	—
2019–20	Tadhg Furlong (3), Jordan Larmour, Garry Ringrose (3)	—
2020–21	—	—
2021–22	Caelan Doris, Josh van der Flier, James Lowe	**Josh van der Flier**
2022–23	Caelan Doris (2), Josh van der Flier (2), Garry Ringrose (4), Jamie Osborne	—
2023–24	Caelan Doris (3), Jamison Gibson-Park, James Lowe (2), Dan Sheehan	—
2024–25	Caelan Doris (4), Jamison Gibson-Park (2), Jordie Barrett	—
2025–26	Caelan Doris (5)	—

European Cup Team of the Year
The following Leinster players were selected on the European Cup team of the year.

All players listed below are Irish unless otherwise noted. Inaugurated 2020-21.

Season	Irish players	Foreign players
2020–21	Rónan Kelleher, Josh van der Flier	—
2021–22	Rónan Kelleher (2), Tadhg Furlong, Ross Molony, Josh van der Flier (2), Johnny Sexton, James Lowe, Garry Ringrose, Hugo Keenan	—
2023–24	Joe McCarthy, Caelan Doris, James Lowe (2)	—

Rugby Champions Cup player records

Most tries
Rank	Player	Tries
1	Brian O'Driscoll	33
2	James Lowe	31
3	Shane Horgan	27
4	Gordon D'Arcy	26
5	Denis Hickie	19

Most appearances
Rank	Player	Apps
1	Cian Healy	114
2	Gordon D'Arcy	104
3	Brian O'Driscoll	87
3	Shane Horgan	87
5	Jamie Heaslip	85

Most points
Rank	Player	Points
1	Johnny Sexton	728
2	Ross Byrne	376
3	Felipe Contepomi	352
4	Alan McGowan	225
5	Brian O'Meara	192

Statistics do not include European Rugby Challenge Cup matches. Updated as of 29 May 2025.

Rugby Champions Cup Individual Season Records

Top Try Scorer
Season	Player	Tries
2004–05	Shane Horgan	8
2008–09	Brian O'Driscoll	5
2016–17	Isa Nacewa	7
2018–19	Seán Cronin	6
2021–22	James Lowe	10
2022–23	Josh van der Flier	6
2023–24	James Lowe	6

Top Point Scorer
Season	Player	Points
2005–06	Felipe Contepomi	129
2010–11	Johnny Sexton	138
2011–12	Johnny Sexton (2)	103
2014–15	Ian Madigan	113
2021–22	Johnny Sexton (3)	83

The players listed above were the top try-scorers and points-scorers for the European Rugby Champions Cup in a given season.

=== United Rugby Championship ===
All players listed below are Irish unless otherwise noted. Inaugurated 2006-07.

United Rugby Championship Team of the Year
The following Leinster players were selected on the Pro 14/URC team of the year.

Season	Irish players	Foreign players
2006–07	Jamie Heaslip, Gordon D'Arcy, Denis Hickie	(Argentina) Felipe Contepomi
2007–08	Jamie Heaslip (2), Leo Cullen, Bernard Jackman, Malcolm O'Kelly	(Argentina) Felipe Contepomi (2), (South Africa) Ollie Le Roux, (Cook Islands) Stan Wright
2008–09	Jamie Heaslip (3), Brian O'Driscoll	(Australia) Rocky Elsom
2009–10	Jamie Heaslip (4), Brian O'Driscoll (2), Leo Cullen (2)	—
2010–11	Jamie Heaslip (5), Richardt Strauss, Seán O'Brien, Mike Ross	(Fiji) Isa Nacewa
2011–12	Richardt Strauss (2)	(Fiji) Isa Nacewa (2)
2012–13	Ian Madigan	—
2013–14	Seán Cronin, Jordi Murphy, Rhys Ruddock	—
2014–15	—	—
2015–16	Josh van der Flier	(Fiji) Isa Nacewa (3), (New Zealand) Ben Te'o
2016–17	Jack Conan, Dan Leavy	—
2017–18	Andrew Porter, Jack Conan (2), Jordan Larmour	(Australia) Scott Fardy, (New Zealand) James Lowe
2018–19	—	(Australia) Scott Fardy (2)
2019–20	Will Connors, Max Deegan	(Australia) Scott Fardy (3)
2020–21	Michael Bent, Dave Kearney, Scott Penny	—
2021–22	Ross Byrne	—
2022–23	Ross Byrne (2), Scott Penny (2), Dan Sheehan	—
2023–24	Jordan Larmour (2)	—
2024–25	Jamie Osbourne	(South Africa) RG Snyman
2025-26	Tom Clarkson	—

United Rugby Championship Player Records

Category	Player	Total
Tries	Dave Kearney	48
Appearances	Devin Toner	191
Points	Johnny Sexton	887
Successful Conversions & Penalties	Ross Byrne	343

Updated 14 June 2025

United Rugby Championship Golden Boot
The Golden Boot is awarded to the kicker who has successfully converted the highest percentage of place kicks during the 22-week regular Pro12 season. To be eligible, the player must have taken at least 20 kicks at goal. The prize has been awarded annually since 2012. (Percentage success rate in brackets)

Season	Winner	Percentage
2011-12	Johnny Sexton	90%
2012-13	Ian Madigan	87%
2014-15	Ian Madigan	87%

United Rugby Championship Individual Awards

Category	Player	Season	Total
Top Try Scorer	Shane Horgan, Girvan Dempsey (Joint)	2001–02	7
Top Try Scorer	Jamie Heaslip (Joint)	2006–07	7
Top Try Scorer	Barry Daly	2017–18	12
Top Try Scorer	Scott Penny (Joint)	2020–21	9
Top Point Scorer	Felipe Contepomi	2005-06	287
Top Point Scorer	Felipe Contepomi (2) (Joint)	2008-09	161
Top Point Scorer	Ian Madigan	2012–13	186
Players' Players of the Year	Dan Sheehan	2022-23	N/A
Players' Players of the Year	RG Snyman	2024-25	N/A
Young Player of the Year	Joey Carbery	2016–17	N/A
Young Player of the Year	Jordan Larmour	2017–18	N/A
Young Player of the Year	Caelan Doris	2019–20	N/A
Young Player of the Year	Scott Penny	2020–21	N/A
Coach of the Year	Leo Cullen	2017–18	N/A
Coach of the Year	Leo Cullen (2)	2021–22	N/A

United Rugby Championship Team Awards

- 2010–11: Fairplay Award
- 2011–12: Fairplay Award

=== End-of-season club awards ===
Season	Player of the Year	Young Player of the Year	Supporters' Player of the Year
2006–07	Gordon D'Arcy	Luke Fitzgerald, Felix Jones	–
2007–08	Bernard Jackman	Luke Fitzgerald	Keith Gleeson
2008–09	Rocky Elsom	Cian Healy	Felipe Contepomi
2009–10	Jamie Heaslip	Rhys Ruddock	Shane Jennings
2010–11	Isa Nacewa	Eoin O'Malley	Shane Horgan
2011–12	Rob Kearney	Ian Madigan	–
2012–13	Ian Madigan	Jordi Murphy	–
2013–14	Jack McGrath	Marty Moore	–
2014–15	Seán Cronin	Jack Conan, Peter Dooley	–
2015–16	Ben Te'o	Josh Van Der Flier	–
2016–17	Luke McGrath	Joey Carbery	Isa Nacewa
2017–18	Dan Leavy	James Ryan	Dan Leavy
2018–19	James Ryan	Max Deegan	Seán Cronin
2019–20	Garry Ringrose	Caelan Doris	–
2020–21	Robbie Henshaw	Ronan Kelleher	Josh van der Flier
2021–22	Josh van der Flier	Dan Sheehan	Ciarán Frawley
2022–23	Caelan Doris	Scott Penny	Garry Ringrose
2023–24	Jamison Gibson-Park	Joe McCarthy	Joe McCarthy
2024–25	RG Snyman	Sam Prendergast	RG Snyman
2025-26	Tommy O'Brien	Paddy McCarthy	Tommy O'Brien

== See also ==
- Rugby union in Ireland
- History of rugby union matches between Leinster and Connacht
- History of rugby union matches between Leinster and Munster
- History of rugby union matches between Leinster and Ulster
