= Juan Gomez (rugby union) =

Argentine rugby union player (born 1984)

- Born: Juan Francisco Gomez; 27 March 1984 (age 42) Buenos Aires, Argentina
- Height: 1.83 m (6 ft 0 in)
- Weight: 115 kg (18 st 2 lb)

Rugby union career
- Position: Prop
Senior career
| Years | Team | Apps | (Points) |
| 2006–07 | Stade Français | 4 | (0) |
| 2007–09 | Leinster | 8 | (0) |
| 2009–11 | Leeds | 44 | (10) |
| 2012–13 | Pampas XV | 12 | (5) |
- Correct as of 21 June 2013
International career
| Years | Team | Apps | (Points) |
| 2006– | Argentina | 6 | (0) |
- Correct as of 11 November 2012

Juan Francisco Gomez (born Buenos Aires 27 March 1984) is a professional rugby union rugby player. He started playing in Los Matreros Rugby Club. His debut game for his country, Argentina, was in 2006 when he was selected to play against Italy. The match took place in Rome where Argentina won 23–16. Juan joined Leinster Rugby in 2007, he moved to Leeds Carnegie in 2009. He is not the first of his countrymen to play their rugby for the Leeds Carnegie club. Other countrymen to have done so were Argentine internationals Diego Albanese, Pablo Bouza, Martin Schusterman and Alberto Di Bernardo.
