= Rhys Ruddock =

Irish rugby union player (born 1990)

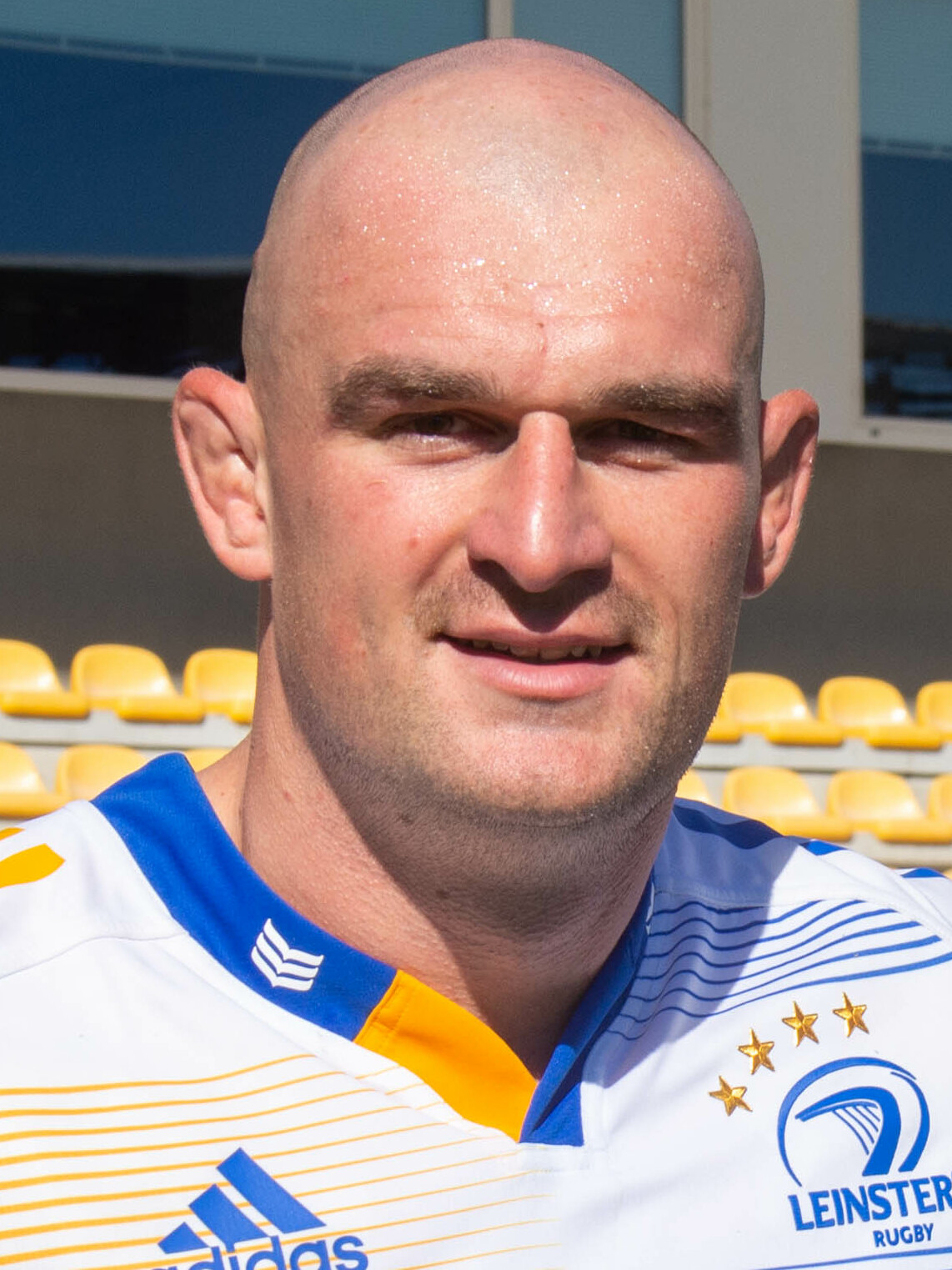
- Ruddock at the 2022–23 United Rugby Championship
- Born: 13 November 1990 (age 36) Dublin, Ireland
- Height: 1.91 m (6 ft 3 in)
- Weight: 113 kg (17.8 st; 249 lb)
- School: Millfield School
- University: University College Dublin
- Notable relative: Mike Ruddock (father)

Rugby union career
- Position: Flanker
Amateur team(s)
Years	Team	Apps	(Points)
- UCD
Senior career
Years	Team	Apps	(Points)
2008–2009	Swansea	3	
2009–2024	Leinster	225	(75)
- Correct as of 2 March 2024
International career
Years	Team	Apps	(Points)
2009–2010	Ireland U20	16	(0)
2013—2015	Emerging Ireland	4	(0)
2012—2014	Ireland Wolfhounds	3	(0)
2010–2021	Ireland	27	(20)
- Correct as of 14 February 2021

Rhys Ruddock (born 13 November 1990) is a former professional rugby union player. He played for Leinster and Ireland. He played in the backrow, at 6 or 8. In the 2009/2010 season, he captained the Irish U20s to winning the Six Nations Championship. He retired at the end of the 22-23 URC season.

Rhys is the son of Welshman and former Wales and Leinster coach Mike Ruddock and Bernadette Mary Ruddock who is Irish. Born in Dublin and raised in Wales, he opted to follow his brother Ciaran Ruddock in joining the Leinster Academy from Ospreys youth, where he subsequently joined the Irish team soon after. He made his Leinster debut against his father's old club Newport Gwent Dragons.

In summer 2010, whilst playing for his first club in Ireland UCD, Ruddock got a call up to the Irish senior squad for their 2010 summer tour where he received his first cap vs Australia due to the shortage of back-row players to injury. He started against New Zealand Māori in a non-cap match, and won his first cap for Ireland when he came off the bench against Australia.

Ruddock was part of the Ireland squad for the 2012 Six Nations tournament. Meanwhile, with Leinster, he became their youngest ever captain against Arioni in the Magners League, when he was still playing for UCD's under-20 side.

Ruddock captained Ireland against the United States in the 2018 Autumn International, a match Ireland won 57–14.

== International analysis by opposition ==
Against	Played	Won	Lost	Drawn	Tries	Points	% Won
Argentina	3	2	1	0	0	0	66.67
Australia	2	1	1	0	0	0	50
England	1	0	1	0	0	0	0
Fiji	1	1	0	0	0	0	100
France	1	0	1	0	0	0	0
Italy	4	4	0	0	0	0	100
Japan	3	2	1	0	1	5	66.67
New Zealand	1	0	1	0	0	0	0
Russia	1	1	0	0	1	5	100
Scotland	1	1	0	0	0	0	100
South Africa	5	3	2	0	2	10	60
United States	2	2	0	0	0	0	100
Wales	2	1	0	1	0	0	50
Total	27	18	8	1	4	20	66.67%

Updated as of 2 April 2023.

== Honours ==
Leinster

- European Rugby Champions Cup (3): 2011, 2012, 2018
- Pro14 (6): 2013, 2014, 2018, 2019, 2020, 2021
- European Challenge Cup (1): 2013

Ireland

- Six Nations Championship (1): 2014

Individual

- Pro14 Team of the Year (1): 2014

== See also ==
- Mike Ruddock
