= Chris Keane =

- Born: 25 October 1978 (age 48) Drogheda, Ireland
- Height: 6 ft 1 in (1.85 m)
- Weight: 14 st 7 lb (92 kg)
- School: Belvedere College
- University: Athlone IT

Rugby union career
- Position: Scrum-half
Senior career
Years	Team	Apps	(Points)
2001–07	Connacht	89	(16)
2007–10	Leinster	28	(5)
International career
Years	Team	Apps	(Points)
2006–08	Ireland A	8	(0)

Chris Keane (born 25 October 1978 in Drogheda) is a former Irish rugby union player. Keane began his provincial career with Connacht where he received 90 caps (65 Celtic/Magners League, 24 ERC Challenge Cup), the first coming against Cardiff Blues in a 6–3 victory. Keane made his Leinster debut on 5 October 2007 against Llanelli Scarlets in a 23–52 Celtic League defeat. On 15 December he made his first Heineken Cup appearance against Edinburgh at Murrayfield. Again it was a match that Leinster lost (29–10). He was released at the end of the 2010 season and subsequently retired from Rugby. Keane has been recognised by his country at sevens, colleges, and 'A' levels.

He is currently co-manager of Skerries Rugby Club with John Murphy.
