= Luke Fitzgerald =

British & Irish Lions international rugby union player

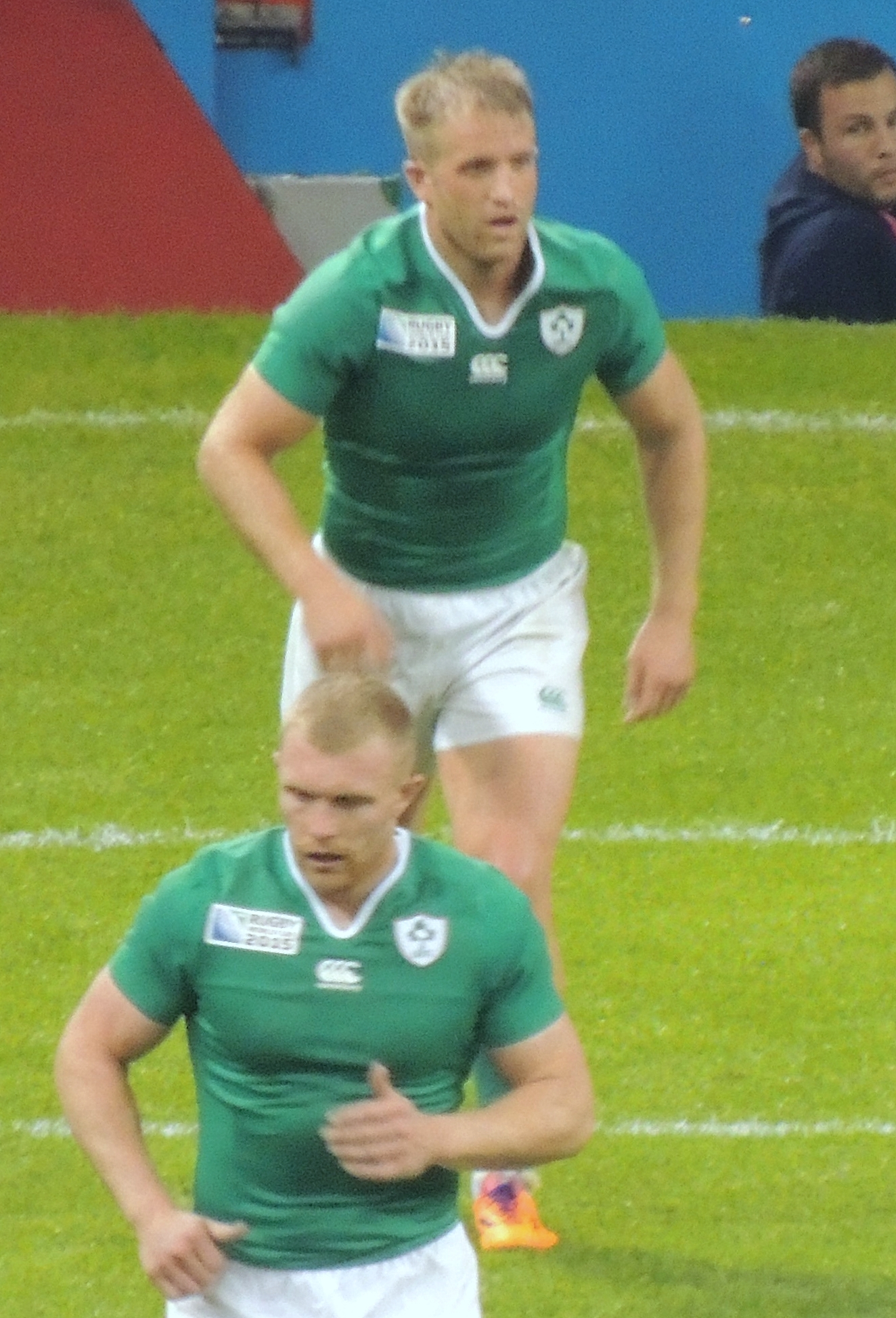
- Fitzgerald (with Keith Earls in the foreground) playing for Ireland during the 2015 Rugby World Cup
- Born: Luke Matthew Fitzgerald; 13 September 1987 (age 39) County Wicklow, Ireland
- Height: 1.85 m (6 ft 1 in)
- Weight: 92 kg (14 st 7 lb; 203 lb)
- School: Blackrock College
- University: University College Dublin

Rugby union career
- Position(s): Wing, Centre, Fullback
- Current team: Leinster
Amateur team(s)
Years	Team	Apps	(Points)
- Blackrock College
Senior career
Years	Team	Apps	(Points)
2006–2016	Leinster	141	(160)
- Correct as of 5 September 2015
International career
Years	Team	Apps	(Points)
2006–2013	Ireland Wolfhounds	3	(5)
2006–2016	Ireland	34	(20)
2009	British & Irish Lions	1	(0)
- Correct as of 18 October 2015

Luke Matthew Fitzgerald (born 13 September 1987) is a former rugby union player. He played at winger or fullback for Leinster. He retired in June 2016. Having previously studied at Blackrock College he won two Leinster Schools Senior Cups, in 2004 and 2006. He won his first cap for Ireland in November 2006. Fitzgerald earned the nickname "Pivot" from Leinster and Irish rugby fans due to his exciting runs and sidesteps from broken play.

On 28 June 2016, Fitzgerald announced his retirement from professional rugby. He had suffered a neck injury in the 2016 Pro12 Final and had been advised to retire on medical grounds.

== Family and personal life ==
An Irish speaker, Fitzgerald has a particular interest in the language. He played hurling at underage level. In Gaelic football, he is a fan of the Dublin senior football team. He played Gaelic Football while he was growing up at Naomh Olaf CLG. Fitzgerald's father Des also played international rugby for Ireland, earning 34 caps at prop between 1984 and 1992.

In August 2019, Fitzgerald became engaged to long-term girlfriend Aisling Burke.

== Schools rugby ==
Fitzgerald played for the Blackrock College Senior Cup Team from 2004 to 2006, winning two Leinster Senior Cup Medals, in 2004 and 2006. He also won a Leinster Junior Cup Medal in 2003, beating Gonzaga College in the final.

He was the 2005 Irish Examiner Young Rugby Player of the Year.

After leaving school, Fitzgerald joined renowned south Dublin club Blackrock College RFC, a natural transition from schools to club rugby.

=== Representative rugby ===
Fitzgerald played four matches for the Leinster Schools' Representative team. In his fifth year Fitzgerald played three games for the Irish Schools team. While in his final year he played three matches for the Leinster Under 19's, all as captain. He also won the Irish Examiner Young Player of the Year for the 2005/06 season.

== Professional rugby ==
=== Provincial ===
After leaving school, Fitzgerald became a regular in the Leinster Magners League squad. He scored his first try for the province against Edinburgh in the Heineken Cup, having come on as a substitute in a game Leinster ultimately lost 25–24. Fitzgerald was part of the Leinster team that beat Leicester Tigers (19–16) to win the 2008–09 Heineken Cup.

=== International ===
Fitzgerald was named in Ireland's squad for the Autumn 2006 international series. After a strong performance against the 'Mid Week Wallabies" playing for Ireland A he won his first cap on 26 November 2006 against the Pacific Islands. In doing so, he became the youngest player to play for Ireland in 29 years. He also became the 999th player to be capped for Ireland.

After much public demand Fitzgerald was given a chance in the centre during Ireland's match with the Barbarians. He had a fine game putting in a lot of tackles, notably on Lesley Vainikolo. He was due to earn a second cap in the centre against the All Blacks. His centre partner would have been Brian O'Driscoll. He was forced to withdraw from this match due to an ankle injury. He was a member of the victorious Ireland team that won the 2009 Six Nations Championship and Grand Slam where he played on the wing and started every game.

On 21 April 2009, Fitzgerald was named as a member of the British & Irish Lions for the 2009 tour to South Africa and made his test debut on 27 June against South Africa, during which he was eye-gouged by Schalk Burger. Burger was yellow-carded for the incident, and was subsequently banned for eight weeks for "making contact with the face in the eye area." He was however cleared of gouging, as his action was found to be "reckless" but not intentional. Fitzgerald believes Burger should have been sent off for gouging his eyes, "I went into the ruck, got cleaned out and felt a hand going for my eyes,"Given the seriousness of the allegations... you would have to say it was probably a red card."

In November 2009, Fitzgerald was injured in Ireland's game against Australia, forcing him out for the rest of the season. He returned from injury at the beginning of the 2010–11 season to start at fullback for Leinster in their first preseason match against London Wasps Rugby Club.

In March 2015, Fitzgerald was named in the starting team for Ireland in the last game of the 2015 Six Nations Championship away to Scotland, his first start since a World Cup warm-up game against France in a 2011 and first game since the defeat to New Zealand in November 2013.
