= 2011–12 Leinster Rugby season =

Leinster Rugby
- 2011–12 season
- Manager: (New Zealand) Joe Schmidt
- Captain: (Ireland) Leo Cullen
- Pro 12 League: Runners-up
- Heineken Cup: Winners vs Ulster
- British and Irish Cup: Semi-final, lost to Munster A
- Top try scorer: All: Ian Madigan (8)
- Top points scorer: All: Johnny Sexton (213)
- Highest home attendance: 50,340 vs. Cardiff Blues; 7 April 2012
- Lowest home attendance: 14,362 vs. Dragons; 9 September 2011
- Average home attendance: 22,549

The 2011–12 Leinster Rugby season was Leinster's eleventh season competing in the Pro12, of which they were runners-up. losing to Ospreys in the final. Fullback Isa Nacewa and hooker Richardt Strauss were named in the league's Dream Team. They also competed in the Heineken Cup which they won for the second consecutive year. The Leinster 'A' team however were knocked out of the British and Irish Cup by Munster A in the semi-final. Rob Kearney was player of the year.

== Squad ==
=== Coaching and management team ===
Position	Name	Nationality
Head & Defence Coach	Josef Schmidt	New Zealand
Forwards Coach	Jono Gibbes	New Zealand
Scrum Coach	Greg Feek	New Zealand
Skills & Kicking Coach	Richie Murphy	Ireland
Chief Executive	Mick Dawson	Ireland
Team Manager	Guy Easterby	Ireland
Team Doctor	Prof. John Ryan	Ireland
Team Doctor	Prof. Arthur Tanner	Ireland
Team Doctor	Dr. Jim McShane	Ireland
Physiotherapist	James Allen	Ireland
Strength & Conditioning Coach	Jason Cowman	Ireland
Chief Scout	Guy Easterby	Ireland

=== Playing squad 2011/2012 ===
Note: Flags indicate national union under World Rugby eligibility rules. Players may hold more than one non-World Rugby nationality.

Player	Position	Union
Seán Cronin	Hooker	Ireland
Richardt Strauss	Hooker	South Africa
Aaron Dundon	Hooker	Ireland
Tom Sexton	Hooker	Ireland
Jamie Hagan	Prop	Ireland
Cian Healy	Prop	Ireland
Jack McGrath	Prop	Ireland
Mike Ross	Prop	Ireland
Heinke van der Merwe	Prop	South Africa
Nathan White	Prop	New Zealand
Damian Browne	Lock	Ireland
Leo Cullen (c)	Lock	Ireland
Ed O'Donoghue	Lock	Ireland
Steven Sykes	Lock	South Africa
Devin Toner	Lock	Ireland
Mark Flanagan	Lock	Ireland
Brad Thorn	Lock	New Zealand
Shane Jennings	Flanker	Ireland
Kevin McLaughlin	Flanker	Ireland
Seán O'Brien	Flanker	Ireland
Dominic Ryan	Flanker	Ireland
Rhys Ruddock	Flanker	Ireland
Leo Auva'a	Number 8	New Zealand
Jamie Heaslip	Number 8	Ireland

Player	Position	Union
Isaac Boss	Scrum-half	Ireland
Eoin Reddan	Scrum-half	Ireland
John Cooney	Scrum-half	Ireland
Matt Berquist	Outside-half	New Zealand
Ian Madigan	Outside-half	Ireland
Johnny Sexton	Outside-half	Ireland
Gordon D'Arcy	Centre	Ireland
Brendan Macken	Centre	Ireland
Fergus McFadden	Centre	Ireland
Brian O'Driscoll	Centre	Ireland
Eoin O'Malley	Centre	Ireland
Fionn Carr	Wing	Ireland
Luke Fitzgerald	Wing	Ireland
Shane Horgan	Wing	Ireland
Dave Kearney	Wing	Ireland
Isa Nacewa	Fullback	Fiji
Andrew Conway	Fullback	Ireland
Rob Kearney	Fullback	Ireland

==== In for 2011–12 ====
- (New Zealand) Matt Berquist from (New Zealand) Crusaders
- (Ireland) Seán Cronin from Connacht
- (Ireland) Jamie Hagan from Connacht
- (South Africa) Steven Sykes from (South Africa) Sharks
- (Ireland) Fionn Carr from Connacht
- (Ireland) Damian Browne from (France) Brive
- (New Zealand) Nathan White from (New Zealand) Chiefs
- (New Zealand) Leo Auva'a from Old Belvedere
- (New Zealand) Brad Thorn from (Japan) Fukuoka Sanix Blues (Loan)

==== Out for 2011/12 ====
- (Cook Islands) Stan Wright to (France) Stade Francais
- (Scotland) Nathan Hines to (France) Clermont Auvergne
- (Ireland) Paul O'Donohoe to Connacht
- (Australia) Shaun Berne to (Italy) Calvisano
- (Ireland) Niall Morris to (England) Leicester Tigers
- (Ireland) Stephen Keogh to Shannon
- (Ireland) Michael Keating to (England) Doncaster Knights
- (Ireland) Stewart Maguire to Connacht
- (Ireland) Jason Harris-Wright to (England) Bristol
- (Ireland) Cillian Willis to (England) Sale Sharks (Loan)
- (Ireland) Ed O'Donoghue to (England) London Wasps
- (Ireland) Eoin Sheriff to (England) Saracens
- (Ireland) Dave McSharry to Connacht
- (Ireland) Shane Horgan retired in March 2012 due to injury; he had not played in the 2011–12 season.

== Pre-season ==
=== Fixtures ===
19 August	Leinster (Ireland)	14 – 13	(Australia) Melbourne Rebels	Donnybrook Stadium, Dublin
19:00	Try: Ruddock 38' c Hudson 52' c Con: Berquist (2/2) 38', 52',	Report	Try: Kingi 24' m Pyle 40' m Pen: Mortlock 12',	Attendance: 3,520; Referee: Wilkinson (Ireland)

26 August	Leinster (Ireland)	14 – 19	(England) Northampton Saints	Donnybrook Stadium, Dublin
19:00	Try: Harris-Wright 73' c Carr 80' c Con: Berquist (2/2) 73', 80',	Report	Try: Diggin 62' c Con: Lamb (1/1) 62', Pen: Myler 11', 26', 36', Lamb 79',	Attendance: 3,784; Referee: Clancy (Ireland)

== RaboDirect PRO12 ==
=== Table ===
Pro12 Table
Pos	Team	Pld	W	D	L	PF	PA	PD	TF	TA	TB	LB	Pts	Qualification (Note: Qualification for the Heineken Cup is based on each country's allocation, i.e. three highest-ranked Irish teams, three highest-ranked Welsh teams, both Italian teams and both Scottish teams. Because Leinster won the 2012 Heineken Cup Final, Ireland earned an extra Heineken Cup place, which will go to Connacht. Aironi were denied a licence for the 2012–13 season due to financial issues; the newly established Zebre side replaced Aironi in the Pro12 and Heineken Cup.)
1	(Ireland) Leinster (F)	22	18	1	3	568	326	+242	48	28	5	2	81	Play-off place
2	(Wales) Ospreys (C)	22	16	1	5	491	337	+154	44	22	2	3	71	Play-off place
3	(Ireland) Munster (SF)	22	14	1	7	489	367	+122	45	27	5	4	67	Play-off place
4	(Scotland) Glasgow Warriors (SF)	22	13	4	5	445	321	+124	34	23	2	3	65	Play-off place
5	(Wales) Scarlets	22	12	2	8	446	373	+73	43	30	5	5	62	
6	(Ireland) Ulster	22	12	0	10	474	424	+50	53	41	5	3	56	
7	(Wales) Cardiff Blues	22	10	0	12	446	460	−14	43	45	5	5	50	
8	(Ireland) Connacht	22	7	1	14	321	433	−112	27	36	0	7	37	
9	(Wales) Newport Gwent Dragons	22	7	1	14	370	474	−104	27	41	1	5	36	
10	(Italy) Benetton Treviso	22	7	0	15	419	558	−139	41	57	3	5	36	
11	(Scotland) Edinburgh	22	6	1	15	454	588	−134	42	65	2	4	32	
12	(Italy) Aironi	22	4	0	18	289	551	−262	22	54	1	5	22	

Updated to match(es) played on 5 May 2012. Source: RaboDirect PRO12
Rules for classification: If teams are level at any stage, tiebreakers are applied in the following order:
1. number of matches won;
2. the difference between points for and points against;
3. the number of tries scored;
4. the most points scored;
5. the difference between tries for and tries against;
6. the fewest red cards received;
7. the fewest yellow cards received.
  (C) Champions; (F) Lost in the final; (SF) Lost in the semi-finals
  Notes:

=== Fixtures ===
2 September 2011	Ospreys (Wales)	27 – 3	(Ireland) Leinster	Liberty Stadium, Swansea
19:05	Try: Webb 2' c Dirksen 20' c Tipuric 40' c Con: Biggar (3/3) 3', 21', 40', Pen: Biggar 12'; Drop: Biggar 28'	Report	Pen: Berquist 31'	Attendance: 5,424; Referee: Fitzgibbon (Ireland)

9 September 2011	Leinster (Ireland)	31 – 10	(Wales) Dragons	RDS Arena, Dublin
19:35	Try: Macken 45' m Madigan 48' c Carr 77' c Con: Nacewa (2/3) 48', 77', Pen: Nacewa 6', 31, 55', 60',	Report	Try: Tovey 57' c Con: Tovey (1/1) 58', Pen: Tovey 12',	Attendance: 14,362; Referee: MacPherson (Scotland)

17 September 2011	Leinster (Ireland)	19 – 23	(Scotland) Glasgow Warriors	RDS Arena, Dublin
18:00	Try: Madigan 37' c Con: Nacewa (1/1) 37', Pen: Nacewa 3', 20', 45', 52',	Report	Try: Campbell 30' c Horne 66' c Con: Wight (1/1) 30', Weir (1/1) 66', Pen: Wight 22', Weir 43', 54',	Attendance: 14,686; Referee: McMenemy (Scotland)

24 September 2011	Scarlets (Wales)	10 – 15	(Ireland) Leinster	Parc y Scarlets, Llanelli
18:30	Try: Williams 47' c Con: Newton (1/1) 48', Pen: Newton 17',	Report	Pen: Nacewa 21', 39', 42', 51', 54',	Attendance: 8,823; Referee: Lacey (Ireland)

1 October 2011	Leinster (Ireland)	26 – 7	(Italy) Aironi	RDS Arena, Dublin
18:00	Try: Madigan 48' c Nacewa 58' m Fitzgerald 68' c Ruddock 80' c Con: Nacewa (3/4) 48', 68', 80'	Report	Try: Williams 35' c Con: Tebaldi (1/1) 35',	Attendance: 14,920; Referee: Mitrea (Italy)

8 October 2011	Leinster (Ireland)	30 – 20	(Ireland) Connacht	RDS Arena, Dublin
17:00	Try: Toner 20' m Fitzgerald 65' c Con: Nacewa (1/2) 66', Pen: Nacewa 11', 44', 50', 75', Madigan 61', Drop: Madigan 80',	Report	Try: Ofisa 31' c Tuohy 37' c Con: O'Connor (2/2) 33', 38', Pen: O'Connor 9', 16',	Attendance: 15,220; Referee: Fitzgibbon (Ireland)

28 October 2011	Edinburgh (Scotland)	28 – 36	(Ireland) Leinster	Murrayfield Stadium, Edinburgh
19:35	Try: Visser 17' c, 43' c Scott 75' m Con: Laidlaw (2/3) 18', 44', Pen: Laidlaw 5', 33', 55',	Report	Try: Boss 25' c Auva'a 60' m Con: Sexton (1/2) 26', Pen: Sexton 8', 16', 21', 35', 50', 67', McFadden 80', Drop: Sexton 70',	Attendance: 3,580; Referee: Hodges (Wales)

4 November 2011	Leinster (Ireland)	24 – 19	(Ireland) Munster	Aviva Stadium, Dublin
20:00	Pen: Sexton 10', 14', 22', 29', 39', 45', 61', Drop: Kearney 56',	Report	Try: Penalty try 77' c Con: O'Gara (1/1) 78', Pen: O'Gara 5', 20', 34', 43',	Attendance: 48,365; Referee: Gauzere (France)

26 November 2011	Benetton Treviso (Italy)	20 – 30	(Ireland) Leinster	Stadio Comunale di Monigo, Treviso
15:00	Try: Vosawai 50' m Pen: Botes 4', 12', 21', 30', 45',	Report	Try: Auva'a 1' c Carr 8' c O'Malley 63' c Con: McFadden (3/3) 1', 8', 63', Pen: McFadden 24', 48', 55',	Attendance: 4,600; Referee: Clancy (Ireland)

2 December 2011	Leinster (Ireland)	52 – 9	(Wales) Cardiff Blues	RDS Arena, Dublin
20:05	Try: Boss 10' c White 45' c Madigan 63' c Kearney (2) 68' m, 71' c Auva'a 79' c Con: McFadden (3/3) 11', 45', 64', Sexton (2/3) 71', 80', Pen: McFadden 5', 14', 43', Drop: McFadden 52',	Report	Pen: Sweeney 2', 20', 40',	Attendance: 16,347; Referee: MacPherson (Scotland)

26 December 2011	Leinster (Ireland)	42 – 13	(Ireland) Ulster Rugby	RDS Arena, Dublin
17:30	Try: Carr 18' c Cronin 25' c Auva'a 40' c Penalty try 67' c Madigan 72' c Hagan 78' c Con: McFadden (6/6) 19', 26', 40', 68', 73', 79',	Report	Try: Cochrane 48' c Con: McKinney 49', Pen: McKinney 28', 36',	Attendance: 18,500; Referee: Fitzgibbon (Ireland)

1 January 2012	Connacht (Ireland)	13 – 15	(Ireland) Leinster	Galway Sportsgrounds, Galway
17:00	Try: O'Halloran 58' m Reynecke 72' m Pen: Jarvis 13',	Report	Pen: Nacewa 17', 22', 34', 49', 64',	Attendance: 6,582; Referee: Lacey (Ireland)

7 January 2012	Cardiff Blues (Wales)	19 – 23	(Ireland) Leinster	Cardiff City Stadium, Cardiff
18:15	Try: Jenkins 57' c Con: Halfpenny (1/1) 57', Pen: Halfpenny 17', 19', 51', Drop: Parks 27',	Report	Try: O'Brien 6' c Kearney 10' c Con: Sexton (2/2) 7', 11', Pen: Sexton 38', 44', McFadden 67',	Attendance: 9,390; Referee: Mitrea (Italy)

9 February 2012	Leinster (Ireland)	42 – 8	(Italy) Benetton Treviso	RDS Arena, Dublin
19:05	Try: Madigan 22' m Strauss 62' c Nacewa 66' c Cooney 71' c Carr 80' c Con: Nacewa (3/4) 64', 67', 72', Madigan (1/1) 80', Pen: Nacewa 5', 33', 52',	Report	Try: Muccignat 55' m Drop: Di Bernardo 19',	Attendance: 15,648; Referee: Hodges (Wales)

17 February 2012	Leinster (Ireland)	16 – 13	(Wales) Scarlets	RDS Arena, Dublin
19:35	Try: McFadden 41' c Con: McFadden (1/1) 42', Pen: McFadden 10', 59', 80',	Report	Try: Newton 24' c Con: Jones (1/1) 25', Pen: Jones 7', Newton 57',	Attendance: 16,683; Referee: Owens (Wales)

25 February 2012	Glasgow Warriors (Scotland)	10 – 10	(Ireland) Leinster	Firhill Stadium, Glasgow
18:00	Try: Penalty try 46' c Con: Jackson (1/1) 46', Pen: Jackson 30',	Report	Try: van der Merwe 53' c Con: Madigan (1/1) 53', Pen: Nacewa 71',	Attendance: 3,115; Referee: Lacey (Ireland)

2 March 2012	Aironi (Italy)	6 – 22	(Ireland) Leinster	Stadio Luigi Zaffanella, Viadana
19:00	Pen: Olivier 44', Orquera 60',	Report	Try: Reid 75' c Con: Madigan (1/1) 75', Pen: Madigan 5', 27', 39', 68', 71',	Attendance: 2,100; Referee: MacPherson (Scotland)

23 March 2012	Leinster (Ireland)	22 – 23	(Wales) Ospreys	RDS Arena, Dublin
19:05	Try: Madigan 33' c Con: McFadden (1/1) 34', Pen: McFadden 2', 21', 26', 44', 60',	Report	Try: Stowers 51' c Hibbard 76' c Con: Biggar (2/2) 52', 77', Pen: Biggar 9', 36', 50',	Attendance: 18,300; Referee: Fitzgibbon (Ireland)

31 March 2012	Munster (Ireland)	9 – 18	(Ireland) Leinster	Thomond Park, Limerick
19:30	Pen: O'Gara 28', 47', 54',	Report	Pen: Sexton 10', 31', 35', 60', McFadden 70', Drop: Madigan 75',	Attendance: 26,500; Referee: Owens (Wales)

13 April 2012	Leinster (Ireland)	54 – 13	(Scotland) Edinburgh	RDS Arena, Dublin
19:45	Try: Jennings 8' m McFadden 15' m Cronin 38' m Carr 43' c Nacewa 64' c Auva'a 67' m Macken 70' c Toner 80' c Con: McFadden (0/3); Nacewa (2/2) 44', 65', Madigan (2/3) 71', 80', Pen: McFadden 29', Nacewa 60',	Report	Try: De Luca 11' c Con: Laidlaw (1/1) 12', Pen: Laidlaw 46', 55',	Attendance: 16,224; Referee: Fitzgibbon (Ireland)

20 April 2012	Ulster (Ireland)	8 – 16	(Ireland) Leinster	Ravenhill Stadium, Belfast
19:05	Try: Muller 25' m Pen: Pienaar 38',	Report	Try: McLaughlin 7' c Con: Sexton (1/1) 8', Pen: Sexton 30', 40', Drop: Sexton 67',	Attendance: 10,500; Referee: Lacey (Ireland)

5 May 2012	Dragons (Wales)	18 – 22	(Ireland) Leinster	Rodney Parade, Newport
19:30	Try: Lydiate 77' c Harries 80' m Con: Hughes (1/2) 77', Pen: Robling 6', 17',	Report	Try: McGrath 22' c Con: Madigan (1/1) 24', Pen: Madigan 3', 9', 13', 64', 71',	Attendance: 8,038; Referee: Mitrea (Italy)

=== Playoffs ===
==== Semi-final ====
12 May 2012	Leinster (Ireland)	19 – 15	(Scotland) Glasgow Warriors	RDS Arena, Dublin
19:35	Try: D. Kearney 66' c Con: Sexton (1/1); Pen: Sexton 7', 23', 38', 63'	Report	Try: Hall 77' m Hogg 80' c Con: Jackson (1/2); Pen: Weir 9'	Attendance: 15,113; Referee: Clancy (Ireland)

=== Final ===
27 May 2012	Leinster (Ireland)	30 – 31	(Wales) Ospreys	RDS Arena, Dublin
16:00	Try: Cronin 26' c Nacewa (2) 35' c, 61' c Con: Sexton (3/3); Pen: Sexton 11', 44', 51'	Report	Try: Beck 42' c Williams (2) 59' m, 78' c Con: Biggar (2/3); Pen: Biggar 8', 22', 34', 73'	Attendance: 18,500; Referee: Romain Poite (France)

== Heineken Cup ==
=== Pool Table ===
Team	P	W	D	L	Tries for	Tries against	Try diff	Points for	Points against	Points diff	TB	LB	Pts
(Ireland) Leinster	6	5	1	0	18	7	+11	172	88	+84	2	0	24
(Scotland) Glasgow Warriors	6	2	1	3	8	12	-4	106	133	-27	0	2	12
(England) Bath	6	2	0	4	11	15	-4	122	151	-29	0	3	11
(France) Montpellier	6	1	2	3	8	11	-3	84	112	-28	0	2	10

=== Fixtures ===
==== Pool Stage ====
12 November 2011	Montpellier (France)	16 – 16	(Ireland) Leinster	Stade de la Mosson, Montpellier
13:30	Try: Ouedraogo 22' c Con: Paillaugue (1/1) 22', Pen: Paillaugue 2', 25', Trinh-Duc 56',	Report	Try: Cronin 66' c Con: Sexton (1/1) 67', Pen: Sexton 5', 16', 80,	Attendance: 20,182; Referee: Pearson (England)

20 November 2011	Leinster (Ireland)	38 – 13	(Scotland) Glasgow Warriors	RDS Arena, Dublin
12:45	Try: Kearney 4' c O'Malley 25' c, 31' c D'Arcy 39' c Boss 80' c Con: Sexton (4/4) 5', 26', 32', 40', Madigan (1/1) 80', Pen: Sexton 16',	Report	Try: Pyrgos 74' c Con: Weir (1/1) 74', Pen: Weir 2', 22',	Attendance: 17,924; Referee: Small (England)

11 December 2011	Bath (England)	13 – 18	(Ireland) Leinster	The Rec, Bath
12:45	Try: Banahan 65' c Con: Barkley (1/1) 67', Pen: Barkley 16', 36',	Report	Pen: Sexton 40', 46', 55', 63', 74', 80',	Attendance: 12,200; Referee: Garcès (France)

17 December 2011	Leinster (Ireland)	52 – 27	(England) Bath	Aviva Stadium, Dublin
18:00	Try: Kearney 4' c Fitzgerald 25' c, 41' c Sexton 33' c Reddan 51' c Ruddock 57' c Madigan 79' c Con: Sexton (6/6) 5', 26', 35', 42', 53', 59', Nacewa (1/1) 79', Drop: Sexton 11',	Report	Try: Donald 63' c Attwood 75' c Williams 80' c Con: Barkley (3/3) 65', 76', 80', Pen: Barkley 8', 15',	Attendance: 46,365; Referee: Poite (France)

15 January 2012	Glasgow Warriors (Scotland)	16 – 23	(Ireland) Leinster	Firhill Stadium, Glasgow
12:45	Try: Gregor 64' c Con: Weir (1/1) 64', Pen: Weir 6', 32', 50',	Report	Try: Kearney 43' c Boss 69' c Con: McFadden (2/2) 44', 69', Pen: Sexton 28', McFadden 40', 56',	Attendance: 6,479; Referee: Owens (Wales)

21 January 2012	Leinster (Ireland)	25 – 3	(France) Montpellier	RDS Arena, Dublin
13:30	Try: O'Brien 9' c Kearney 16' c Healy 42' m Con: McFadden (2/3) 10', 17', Pen: McFadden 13', 40',	Report	Pen: Bustos Moyano 67',	Attendance: 18,500; Referee: Paterson (Scotland)

=== Quarter-final ===
7 April 2012	Leinster (Ireland)	34 – 3	(Wales) Cardiff Blues	Aviva Stadium, Dublin
17:45	Try: Nacewa 12' c Kearney 30' c, 47' c O'Driscoll 34' c Con: Sexton (4/4) 14', 31', 35', 48', Pen: Sexton 10', 22',	Report	Pen: Halfpenny 3',	Attendance: 50,340; Referee: Pearson (England)

=== Semi-final ===
29 April 2012	Clermont Auvergne (France)	15 – 19	(Ireland) Leinster	Stade Chaban-Delmas, Bordeaux
16:00 CEST	Pen: James 18', 31', 36', 39', 52'	Report	Try: Healy 41' c Con: Sexton (1/1) 42', Pen: Sexton 8', 34', 63'; Drop: Kearney (1/1) 46'	Attendance: 32,397; Referee: Barnes (England)

=== Final ===
19 May 2012	Leinster (Ireland)	42–14	(Ireland) Ulster	Twickenham Stadium, London
17:00 BST	Try: O'Brien 12' c Healy 31' c penalty try 44' c van der Merwe 76' m Cronin 80' c Con: Sexton (3/3); McFadden (1/2); Pen: Sexton 51', 67', 73'	Report	Try: Tuohy 60' m Pen: Pienaar 7', 40', 49'	Attendance: 81,774; Referee: Nigel Owens (Wales)

== Player statistics ==
=== Squad ===
Last updated 9 June 2012

Key: = Appearances, = Tries, = Yellow card, (red card) = Red card

Position	Nation	Name	Pro12				Heineken Cup				Total			
Position	Nation	Name		Try	Yellow card	Red card		Try	Yellow card	Red card		Try	Yellow card	Red card
HK	(Ireland)	Seán Cronin	14	3	0	0	9	2	0	0	23	5	0	0
HK	(South Africa)	Richardt Strauss	20	1	0	0	8	0	0	0	28	1	0	0
HK	(Ireland)	Aaron Dundon	5	0	0	0	0	0	0	0	5	0	0	0
HK	(Ireland)	Tom Sexton	1	0	0	0	0	0	0	0	1	0	0	0
PR	(Ireland)	Jamie Hagan	17	1	0	0	1	0	0	0	18	1	0	0
PR	(Ireland)	Simon Shawe	0	0	0	0	0	0	0	0	0	0	0	0
PR	(Ireland)	Cian Healy	8	0	0	0	8	3	0	0	16	3	0	0
PR	(Ireland)	Mike Ross	9	0	1	0	9	0	0	0	18	0	1	0
PR	(South Africa)	Heinke van der Merwe	22	1	1	0	9	1	0	0	31	2	1	0
PR	(New Zealand)	Nathan White	16	1	1	0	7	0	0	0	23	1	1	0
PR	(Ireland)	Jack McGrath	12	0	1	0	0	0	0	0	12	0	1	0
PR	(Ireland)	Jack O'Connell	2	0	0	0	0	0	0	0	2	0	0	0
PR	(Ireland)	Martin Moore	1	0	0	0	0	0	0	0	1	0	0	0
LK	(Ireland)	Damian Browne	17	0	0	0	4	0	1	0	21	0	1	0
LK	(Ireland)	Leo Cullen	9	0	2	0	9	0	1	0	18	0	3	0
LK	(Ireland)	Ed O'Donoghue	0	0	0	0	0	0	0	0	0	0	0	0
LK	(Ireland)	Eoin Sheriff	0	0	0	0	0	0	0	0	0	0	0	0
LK	(Ireland)	Mark Flanagan	6	0	0	0	0	0	0	0	6	0	0	0
LK	(South Africa)	Steven Sykes	4	0	0	0	0	0	0	0	4	0	0	0
LK	(Ireland)	Devin Toner	22	2	0	0	8	0	1	0	30	2	1	0
LK	(Ireland)	Ciaran Ruddock	1	0	0	0	0	0	0	0	1	0	0	0
LK	(New Zealand)	Brad Thorn	4	0	0	0	3	0	0	0	7	0	0	0
FL	(Ireland)	Shane Jennings	14	1	0	0	9	0	0	0	23	1	0	0
FL	(Ireland)	Kevin McLaughlin	19	1	0	0	7	0	0	0	26	1	0	0
FL	(Ireland)	Seán O'Brien	6	1	0	0	9	2	1	0	15	3	1	0
FL	(Ireland)	Dominic Ryan	11	0	0	0	0	0	0	0	11	0	0	0
FL	(Ireland)	Rhys Ruddock	17	1	0	0	4	1	0	0	21	2	0	0
FL	(Ireland)	Jordi Murphy	6	0	0	0	0	0	0	0	6	0	0	0
N8	(Ireland)	Jamie Heaslip	7	0	1	0	9	0	0	0	16	0	1	0
N8	(New Zealand)	Leo Auva'a	19	5	0	0	0	0	0	0	19	5	0	0
SH	(Ireland)	Isaac Boss	14	2	1	0	8	2	0	0	22	4	1	0
SH	(Ireland)	Eoin Reddan	12	0	0	0	9	1	0	0	21	1	0	0
SH	(Ireland)	John Cooney	5	1	0	0	1	0	0	0	6	1	0	0
SH	(Ireland)	Cillian Willis	6	0	0	0	0	0	0	0	6	0	0	0
SH	(Ireland)	Luke McGrath	1	0	0	0	0	0	0	0	1	0	0	0
OH	(New Zealand)	Matt Berquist	2	0	0	0	0	0	0	0	2	0	0	0
OH	(Ireland)	Ian Madigan	21	7	0	0	5	1	0	0	26	8	0	0
OH	(Ireland)	Johnny Sexton	8	0	0	0	8	1	0	0	16	1	0	0
OH	(Ireland)	Noel Reid	6	1	0	0	0	0	0	0	6	1	0	0
CE	(Ireland)	Gordon D'Arcy	8	0	0	0	9	1	0	0	17	1	0	0
CE	(Ireland)	Colm O'Shea	2	0	0	0	0	0	0	0	2	0	0	0
CE	(Ireland)	Brendan Macken	10	2	0	0	0	0	0	0	10	2	0	0
CE	(Ireland)	Fergus McFadden	13	3	0	0	8	0	0	0	21	3	0	0
CE	(Ireland)	Brian O'Driscoll	4	0	0	0	3	1	0	0	7	1	0	0
CE	(Ireland)	Eoin O'Malley	17	1	0	0	5	2	0	0	22	3	0	0
WG	(Ireland)	Fionn Carr	18	5	0	0	2	0	0	0	20	5	0	0
WG	(Ireland)	Luke Fitzgerald	13	2	0	0	6	2	0	0	19	4	0	0
WG	(Ireland)	Shane Horgan	0	0	0	0	0	0	0	0	0	0	0	0
WG	(Ireland)	David Kearney	19	3	0	0	2	0	0	0	21	3	0	0
WG	(Ireland)	Darren Hudson	5	0	0	0	0	0	0	0	5	0	0	0
FB	(Fiji)	Isa Nacewa	18	5	1	0	9	1	0	0	27	6	1	0
FB	(Ireland)	Andrew Conway	7	0	0	0	0	0	0	0	7	0	0	0
FB	(Ireland)	Rob Kearney	7	1	0	0	9	6	0	0	16	7	0	0

== End-of-season awards ==
The Leinster Rugby Awards ceremony was held at the Mansion House, Dublin, on 21 April 2012. Winners were:

- Players' player of the year: Rob Kearney
- Young player of the year: Ian Madigan
- Try of the year: Brian O'Driscoll
- Hall of Fame: Ned Thornton
- Club of the year: Skerries RFC
- Club player of the year: Ross McAuley, Skerries RFC
- Ladies' player of the year: Paula Fitzpatrick, St Mary's College RFC
- Ladies' club person of the year: Mary McMahon, Old Belvedere RFC
- Club public relations officer of the year: Jim Casey, Naas RFC
- School of the year: St Michael's College, Dublin
- Special merit award: St Conleth's College
- Special award: Aisling O'Connor
- Wagamama Noodler of the year: Fionn Carr

The Pro12 Awards were presented at the Hilton Hotel, Cardiff, on 6 May 2012. Joe Schmidt was coach of the year, Johnny Sexton won the golden boot award, and Leinster won the Fair Play award. Isa Nacewa and Richardt Strauss were named in the league's Dream Team.
