= 2010–11 Leinster Rugby season =

Leinster Rugby
- 2010–11 season
- Manager: (New Zealand) Joe Schmidt
- Captain: (Ireland) Leo Cullen
- Celtic League: Runners-up
- Heineken Cup: Winners
- British and Irish Cup: Quarter-finals
- Top try scorer: League: Celtic League; Shane Horgan (7); Heineken Cup; Seán O'Brien (4)
- Top points scorer: League: Celtic League; Isa Nacewa (142); Heineken Cup; Johnny Sexton (138)
- Highest home attendance: 50,645 vs Munster; 2 October 2010, Aviva Stadium
- Lowest home attendance: 9,790 vs Aironi; 10 February 2011
Home colours	Away colours	Third colours

The 2010–11 Leinster Rugby season was Leinster's tenth competing in the Celtic League, alongside which they competed in the 2010–11 Heineken Cup. The Leinster 'A' team competed in the British and Irish Cup for their second season.

Leinster reached the 2011 Celtic League Grand Final in Thomond Park, Limerick against Munster, after finishing 2nd in the league format & beating Ulster in the semi-finals, however Leinster were beaten by Munster who had won the league twice before. In the Heineken Cup, Leinster finished top of their pool which consisted of Clermont Auvergne, Racing Metro and Saracens. Leinster beat Leicester Tigers in the quarter-finals & Stade Toulousain in the semi-finals. Leinster beat Northampton Saints in the 2011 Heineken Cup Final in the Millennium Stadium in Cardiff to win the Heineken Cup for their second time. The Leinster 'A' team were beaten by the Bedford Blues in the British & Irish Cup Quarter-Finals.

Isa Nacewa was player of the year.

== Squad ==
=== Coaching and Management team ===
Head coach Michael Cheika left at the end of 2009–10, after 5 seasons with the province. He was replaced by former Clermont backs coach Joe Schmidt, who joined on a three-year contract. The rest of the coaching team would be announced before the end of the 2009–10 season.

Position	Name	Nationality
Head & Defence Coach	Joe Schmidt	New Zealand
Forwards Coach	Jono Gibbes	New Zealand
Scrum Coach	Greg Feek	New Zealand
Backs Coach	TBA	
Skills & Kicking Coach	Richie Murphy	Ireland
Chief Executive	Mick Dawson	Ireland
Team Manager	Guy Easterby	Ireland
Physiotherapist	James Allen	Ireland
Strength & Conditioning Coach	Chris Dennis	Ireland
Chief Scout	Guy Easterby	Ireland
Baggage Master	Patrick Moloi	Botswana

=== Playing Squad 2010/2011 ===
Note: Flags indicate national union under World Rugby eligibility rules. Players may hold more than one non-World Rugby nationality.

Player	Position	Union
**John Fogarty**	Hooker	Ireland
Jason Harris-Wright	Hooker	Ireland
Richardt Strauss	Hooker	South Africa
**Cian Healy**	Prop	Ireland
Jack McGrath	Prop	Ireland
Ronan McCormack	Prop	Ireland
**Mike Ross**	Prop	Ireland
**Heinke van der Merwe**	Prop	South Africa
**Stan Wright**	Prop	Cook Islands
**Leo Cullen** (c)	Lock	Ireland
**Nathan Hines**	Lock	Scotland
**Mariano Galarza**	Lock	Argentina
**Trevor Hogan**	Lock	Ireland
Ed O'Donoghue	Lock	Ireland
Eoin Sheriff	Lock	Ireland
Devin Toner	Lock	Ireland
**Shane Jennings**	Flanker	Ireland
**Kevin McLaughlin**	Flanker	Ireland
**Seán O'Brien**	Flanker	Ireland
Rhys Ruddock	Flanker	Ireland
Paul Ryan	Flanker	Ireland
Dominic Ryan	Flanker	Ireland
**Jamie Heaslip**	Number 8	Ireland
Stephen Keogh	Number 8	Ireland

Player	Position	Union
**Isaac Boss**	Scrum-half	Ireland
Paul O'Donohoe	Scrum-half	Ireland
**Eoin Reddan**	Scrum-half	Ireland
Shaun Berne	Fly-half	Australia
**Johnny Sexton**	Fly-half	Ireland
Ian Madigan	Fly-half	Ireland
**Gordon D'Arcy**	Centre	Ireland
**Fergus McFadden**	Centre	Ireland
Brendan Macken	Centre	Ireland
**Brian O'Driscoll**	Centre	Ireland
Eoin O'Malley	Centre	Ireland
**Luke Fitzgerald**	Wing	Ireland
**Shane Horgan**	Wing	Ireland
Simon Keogh	Wing	Ireland
David Kearney	Wing	Ireland
**Isa Nacewa**	Wing	Fiji
Andrew Conway	Fullback	Ireland
**Rob Kearney**	Fullback	Ireland
Niall Morris	Fullback	Ireland

Bold indicates full international capped played.

==== In for 2010–11 ====
- (Ireland) Isaac Boss (from Ulster)
- (Argentina) Mariano Galarza (from Universitario de La Plata)
- (Ireland) Ed O'Donoghue (from Ulster)
- (South Africa) Heinke van der Merwe (from Golden Lions)

==== Promoted from the Leinster Academy ====
- (Ireland) Niall Moris
- (Ireland) Andrew Conway
- (Ireland) Brendan Macken
- (Ireland) Jack McGrath
- (Ireland) Eoin Sherrif
- (Ireland) Paul Ryan
- (Ireland) Dominic Ryan
- (Ireland) Rhys Ruddock
- (Ireland) Ian Madigan

==== Out for 2010–11 ====
- (Ireland) Malcolm O'Kelly (retiring)
- (Ireland) Girvan Dempsey (retiring)
- (Argentina) Mariano Galarza to Pampas XV
- (Ireland) Bernard Jackman (retiring)
- (Ireland) Chris Keane
- (South Africa) CJ van der Linde to Cheetahs

== Celtic League ==
=== Table ===
	Team	Pld	W	D	L	PF	PA	PD	TF	TA	Try bonus	Losing bonus	Pts
1	(Ireland) Munster	21	18	0	3	474	321	+153	41	22	5	2	79
2	(Ireland) Leinster	21	14	1	6	457	333	+124	46	25	4	3	65
3	(Ireland) Ulster	21	14	1	6	460	405	+55	41	34	3	2	63
4	(Wales) Cardiff Blues	21	13	1	7	456	354	+102	35	29	3	3	60
5	(Wales) Ospreys	21	11	1	9	541	408	+133	56	28	6	7	59
6	(Wales) Scarlets	21	11	1	9	465	430	+35	45	41	4	7	57
7	(Wales) Newport Gwent Dragons	21	10	1	10	431	442	−11	46	46	3	3	48
8	(Scotland) Edinburgh	21	9	0	12	415	429	−14	39	41	2	5	43
9	(Ireland) Connacht	21	7	1	13	388	437	−49	32	40	3	6	39
10	(Italy) Benetton Treviso	21	8	0	13	343	496	−153	26	58	0	2	34
11	(Scotland) Glasgow Warriors	21	6	1	14	398	505	−107	33	44	1	6	33
12	(Italy) Aironi	21	1	0	20	237	505	−268	20	52	0	7	11
Correct as of 30 April 2011

=== Fixtures ===
3 September 2010
19:05

Glasgow Warriors (Scotland)	22 – 19	(Ireland) Leinster
	Report

Firhill Stadium
Attendance: 2,879
Referee: Tim Hayes

11 September 2010
18:30

Leinster (Ireland)	34 – 23	(Wales) Cardiff Blues
	Report

RDS Arena
Attendance: 15,890
Referee: Andy Macpherson

18 September 2010
19:05

Benetton Treviso (Italy)	29 – 13	(Ireland) Leinster
	Report

Stadio di Monigo
Attendance: 5,000
Referee: Peter Allan

24 September 2010
19:05

Edinburgh (Scotland)	32 – 24	(Ireland) Leinster
	Report

Murrayfield
Attendance: 2,923
Referee: Tim Hayes

2 October 2010
19:30

Leinster (Ireland)	13 – 9	(Ireland) Munster
	Report

Aviva Stadium
Attendance: 50,645
Referee: J Garces

30 October 2010
18:05

Leinster (Ireland)	19 – 18	(Scotland) Edinburgh
	Report

RDS Arena
Attendance: 16,786
Referee: Carlo Damasco

19 November 2010
19:05

Leinster (Ireland)	27 – 6	(Wales) Newport Gwent Dragons
	Report

RDS Arena
Attendance: 10,390
Referee: Stefano Penne

28 November 2010
17:00

Ospreys (Wales)	19 – 15	(Ireland) Leinster
	Report

Liberty Stadium
Attendance: 4,122
Referee: David Wilkinson

3 December 2010
19:05

Scarlets (Wales)	17 – 17	(Ireland) Leinster
	Report

Parc y Scarlets
Attendance: 5,142
Referee: Nigel Owens

27 December 2010
16:00

Ulster (Ireland)	13 – 30	(Ireland) Leinster
	Report

Ravenhill
Attendance: 11,426

1 January 2011
17:30

Leinster (Ireland)	30 – 8	(Ireland) Connacht
	Report

RDS Arena
Attendance: 17,136

7 January 2011

Leinster (Ireland)	15 - 10	(Wales) Ospreys
	Report

RDS Arena
Attendance: 14,876

10 February 2011
19:05

Leinster (Ireland)	21 – 16	(Italy) Aironi
	Report

RDS Arena
Attendance: 9,790
Referee: Nigel Owens

19 February 2011
18:30

Cardiff Blues (Wales)	11 – 3	(Ireland) Leinster
	Report

Cardiff City Stadium
Attendance: 10,741
Referee: Carlo Damasco

25–27 February 2011
19:10

Leinster (Ireland)	30 – 5	(Italy) Benetton Treviso
	Report

RDS Arena
Attendance: 10,236
Referee: Neil Hennessy

4 March 2011
19:35

Leinster (Ireland)	26 – 15	(Wales) Scarlets
	Report

RDS Arena
Attendance: 11,976
Referee: Andy Macpherson

27 March 2011
14:30

Newport Gwent Dragons (Wales)	16 – 26	(Ireland) Leinster
	Report

Rodney Parade
Attendance: 4,028
Referee: Andy MacPherson

2 April 2011
19:30

Munster (Ireland)	24 – 23	(Ireland) Leinster
	Report

Thomond Park
Attendance: 25,923
Referee: Andrew Small

16 April 2011

Leinster (Ireland)	36 – 28	(Ireland) Ulster
	Report

RDS Arena
Attendance: 17,670
Referee: Pascal Gauzere

23 April 2011

Aironi (Italy)	8 – 20	(Ireland) Leinster
	Report

Stadio Zaffanella
Referee: Andrew McMenemy

6 May 2011
19:05

Leinster (Ireland)	38 – 3	(Scotland) Glasgow Warriors
	Report

RDS Arena
Referee: James Jones

==== Semi-final ====
13 May 2011	Leinster (Ireland)	18 – 3	(Ireland) Ulster	RDS Arena
19:05	Try: McFadden 25' m Fitzgerald 72' c Con: McFadden (1/1); Pen: Sexton (2/3) 5', 40'	Report	Pen: Pienaar (1/1) 62'	Referee: George Clancy

==== Final ====
28 May 2011	Munster (Ireland)	19 – 9	(Ireland) Leinster	Thomond Park
17:05	Try: Howlett 12' c Earls 66' m Penalty try 79' c Con: O'Gara (2/3)	Report	Pen: Sexton (3/4) 29', 46', 60'	Attendance: 25,822; Referee: Nigel Owens

== Heineken Cup ==
=== Pool table ===
Team	P	W	D	L	Tries for	Tries against	Try diff	Points for	Points against	Points diff	TB	LB	Pts
(Ireland) Leinster	6	5	0	1	21	9	+12	179	104	+75	3	1	24
(France) Clermont	6	4	0	2	14	9	+5	114	94	+20	2	1	19
(France) Racing Métro	6	2	0	4	9	17	−8	104	151	−47	0	1	9
(England) Saracens	6	1	0	5	9	18	−9	107	155	−48	0	2	6

=== Fixtures ===
==== Pool stage ====
9 October 2010	Leinster (Ireland)	38 – 22	(France) Racing Métro 92	RDS Arena, Dublin
13:30	Try: O'Brien 30' c Kearney 33' m Strauss 48' m Heaslip 62' c McFadden 79' m Con: Nacewa (2/5); Pen: Nacewa (3/4) 4', 28', 38'	Report	Try: Vulivuli 55' c Con: Fillol (1/1); Pen: Fillol (3/3) 12', 41', 66'; Steyn (2/3) 36', 51'	Attendance: 17,936; Referee: Dave Pearson (England)

16 October 2010	Saracens (England)	23 – 25	(Ireland) Leinster	Wembley Stadium, London
17:45	Try: Goode 12' m Con: Hougaard; Pen: Hougaard (2/3) 15', 33'; Goode (4/4) 55', 62', 68', 74'	Report	Try: Sexton 52' c Con: Sexton (1/1); Pen: Sexton (6/6) 6', 19', 26', 35', 44', 63'	Attendance: 45,892; Referee: Christophe Berdos (France)

12 December 2010	ASM Clermont Auvergne (France)	20 - 13	(Ireland) Leinster	Stade Marcel-Michelin, Clermont
16:00	Try: Malzieu 6' c Floch 53' c Con: Parra (2/2); Pen: Parra (2/3) 24', 60'	Report	Try: Horgan 3' c Con: Sexton (1/1); Pen: Sexton (2/2) 11', 57'	Attendance: 16,106; Referee: Wayne Barnes (England)

18 December 2010	Leinster (Ireland)	24 - 8	(France) ASM Clermont Auvergne	Aviva Stadium, Dublin
17:45	Try: Healy 7' c Healy 43' c O'Brien 50' c Con: Sexton (3/3); Pen: Sexton (1/1)	Report	Try: Nalaga 68' m Pen: Parra (1/3)	Attendance: 44,873; Referee: Nigel Owens (Wales)

15 January 2011	Leinster (Ireland)	43 - 20	(England) Saracens	RDS Arena, Dublin
13:30	Try: O'Brien 6' m D. Ryan (2) 11' c, 37' c McFadden 50' c Nacewa 60' c O'Malley 63' c Con: Sexton (5/6); Pen: Sexton (1/1) 28'	Report	Try: Short 24' c Brown 32' m Mordt 80' m Con: Farrell (1/3); Pen: Farrell (1/1) 56'	Attendance: 18,500; Referee: Romain Poite (France)

21 January 2011	Racing Métro 92 (France)	11 – 36	(Ireland) Leinster	Stade Olympique Yves-du-Manoir, Colombes
21:00	Try: Vakatawa 15' m Pen: Hernández (2/3) 2', 36'	Report	Try: Nacewa 11' c O'Brien 19' c Sexton (2) 23' c, 62' m O'Driscoll 68' c Con: Sexton (4/5); Pen: Sexton (1/1) 54'	Attendance: 8,326; Referee: Greg Garner (England)

==== Quarter-final ====
9 April 2011	Leinster (Ireland)	17 – 10	(England) Leicester Tigers	Aviva Stadium, Dublin
18:00	Try: Nacewa 48' m Pen: Sexton (4/4) 3', 15' 36', 73'	Report	Try: Hawkins 76' c Con: Flood (1/1); Pen: Flood (1/2) 5'	Attendance: 49,762; Referee: Nigel Owens (Wales)

==== Semi-final ====
30 April	Leinster (Ireland)	32 - 23	(France) Toulouse	Aviva Stadium, Dublin
15:30 (UTC)	Try: Heaslip 30' c O'Driscoll 59' c Con: Sexton (2/2) 30', 60'; Pen: Sexton (6/6) 10', 14', 40'+1', 47', 54', 80'	Report	Try: Fritz 4' c Picamoles 43' c Con: Skrela (2/2) 5', 45'; Pen: Skrela (1/2) 37'; Bézy (1/1) 75'; Drop: Skrela (1/1) 11'	Attendance: 50,073; Referee: Dave Pearson (England)

==== Final ====
21 May 2011	Northampton Saints (England)	22–33	(Ireland) Leinster	Millennium Stadium, Cardiff
17:00	Try: Dowson 7' c Foden 30' c Hartley 39' m Con: Myler (2/3); Pen: Myler (1/1) 20'	Report	Try: Sexton (2) 43' c, 52' c Hines 64' c Con: Sexton (3/3); Pen: Sexton (4/5) 13', 35', 56', 60'	Attendance: 72,456; Referee: Romain Poite (France)

== End-of-season awards ==
The Leinster Rugby Awards ceremony was held at the Burlington Hotel, Dublin, on 7 May 2011. Winners were:

- Players' player of the year: Isa Nacewa
- Young player of the year: Eoin O'Malley
- Hall of Fame: Niall Brophy
- Try of the year: Isa Nacewa
- Tackle of the year: Dominic Ryan
- Club of the year: St Mary's College RFC
- Club player of the year: Bevan Duffy, Boyne RFC
- Ladies' player of the year: Sinead Ryan, Blackrock College RFC
- Ladies' club player of the year: Carmela Morey, Cill Dara RFC
- Club public relations officer of the year: Owen Taaffe, Skerries RFC
- School of the year: Clongowes Wood College
- Special merit school: Newpark Comprehensive School
