= Jordi Murphy =

Ireland international rugby union player (born 1991)

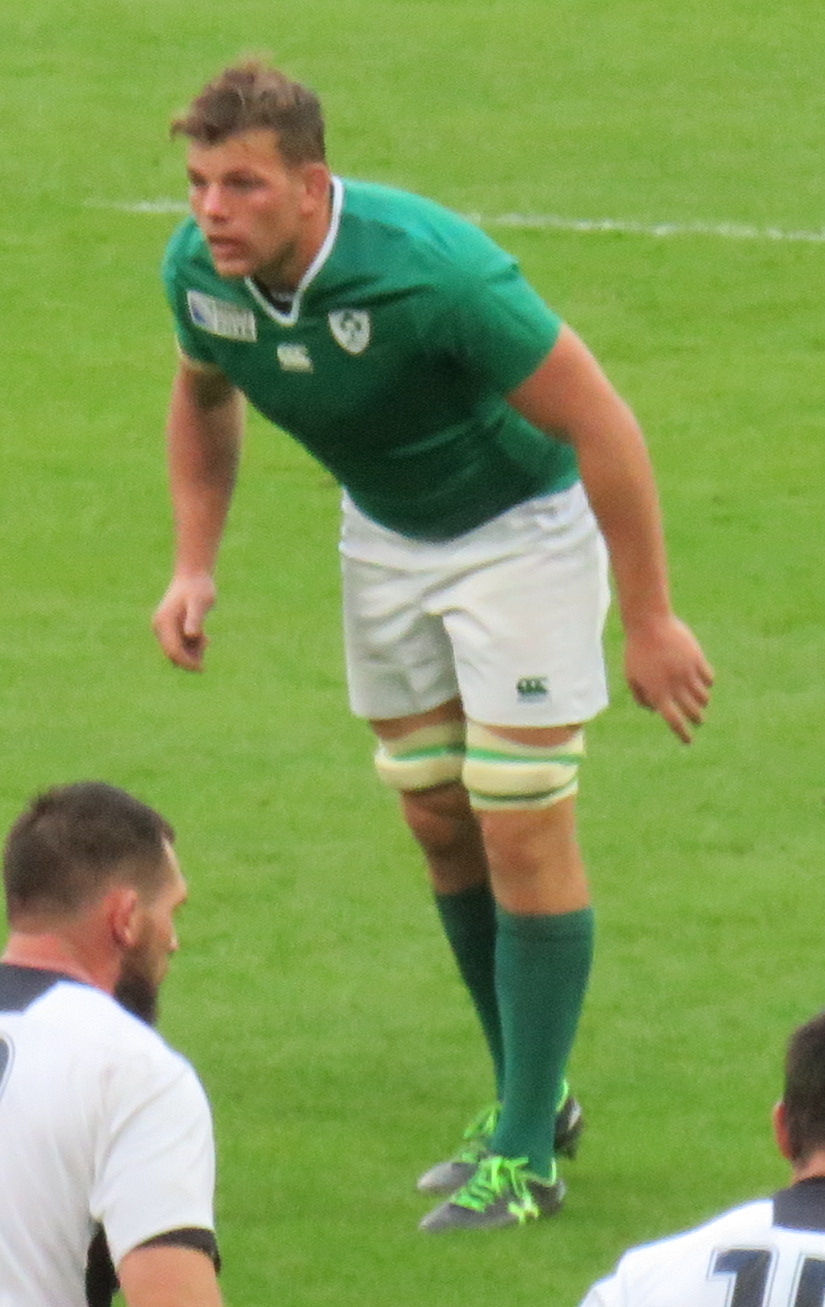
- Murphy playing for Ireland against Romania during the 2015 Rugby World Cup
- Born: Jordi Murphy; 22 April 1991 (age 35) Barcelona, Spain
- Height: 1.88 m (6 ft 2 in)
- Weight: 106 kg (16 st 10 lb; 234 lb)
- School: Blackrock College

Rugby union career
- Position: Flanker / Number 8
- Current team: Ulster
Senior career
Years	Team	Apps	(Points)
2011–2018	Leinster	107	(90)
2018–2023	Ulster	64	(45)
- Correct as of 5 May 2023
International career
Years	Team	Apps	(Points)
2008–2009	Ireland Schools	5	
2010–2011	Ireland U20	13	(0)
2013	Emerging Ireland	3	(0)
2014	Ireland Wolfhounds	1	(0)
2014–2019	Ireland	30	(15)
- Correct as of 25 April 2020

Jordi Murphy (born 22 April 1991) is a former Irish international rugby player. He played for provincial and United Rugby Championship side Ulster as a loose forward, and played for the Ireland national rugby union team.

== Early life ==
Murphy was born in Barcelona to Irish parents, Conor Murphy and Nicola Carroll. He was named after Catalonia's patron saint St. Jordi, a decision which was influenced by the nurses on duty the night of his birth as the following day was the St Jordi's Day festival. Murphy moved to Dublin at the age of nine where he attended Willow Park primary school.

Murphy played rugby with Blackrock and was part of a successful junior side which won the Leinster Schools Junior Cup in 2006 against Gonzaga College. He later went on to captain the senior side who won the Leinster Senior Cup in 2009. Blackrock triumphed over Terenure in the final with an 18–9 victory making it their 66th senior title.

== Professional career ==
Murphy was part of the Leinster Academy and played for Leinster A on 18 occasions representing them in British and Irish Cup and against the other three provinces.

At the beginning of the 2011–12 Pro 12 League season Leinster had 14 players unavailable for selection as they were representing Ireland in the 2011 Rugby World Cup. With a depleted squad and some impressive displays this led to Murphy getting his first senior appearance in their third game of the season. The match was a 19–23 home defeat against Scottish side Glasgow Warriors with Murphy coming on as substitute in the 45th minute replacing Dominic Ryan. In the following league match on 24 September 2011 he made his first competitive start for Leinster in 15–10 away victory against Scarlets in which Fijian Isa Nacewa scored all of the Leinster points. The match was Scarlets 5000th game in the region's 139-year history.

Murphy scored his first try for the province against Cardiff Blues in a nine try victory. In the same match he also picked up the man-of-the-match award. On 15 December 2012, he made his Heineken Cup debut late on against Clermont Auvergne, replacing injured team-mate Shane Jennings. Towards the end of the season he was named Powerade Young Player of the Year at Leinster Rugby's Annual Awards Ceremony held at the Mansion House in Dublin. Only a matter of days later Murphy captained Leinster 'A' to victory over Newcastle Falcons in the final of the British and Irish Cup.

Murphy moved to Ulster for the 2018–2019 season. In his first season with the province, he made 18 appearances and 227 tackles, with a 94% tackle success rate. He made 16 appearances in 2019–2020. He sustained in injury in May 2021 during a Pro14 Rainbow Cup match against Munster, which kept him out until February 2022.

In April 2023, Murphy announced his retirement from professional rugby at the end of the 2022–23 season.

== International career ==
Murphy represented Ireland at Under-18, Under-19 and Under-20 levels. In the summer of 2013, Murphy was selected for an Emerging Ireland squad for the 2013 IRB Tbilisi Cup. He went on to play in all three matches against Georgia, South Africa President's XV and Uruguay. Ireland ended the competition as runners-up with Murphy providing an assist in the final match for a Niall Annett try.

He gained his first senior cap for Ireland as a second-half replacement against England at Twickenham in the 2014 RBS 6 Nations on 22 February 2014, winning further caps that year against Italy (8 March) and Argentina (7 June and 14 June). He was a member of Ireland's successful 2015 Six Nations squad, starting in two test matches (Italy, England) and coming on as a replacement against France, Wales and Scotland during that campaign. In September 2015 he was selected as a member of the 31-man Ireland squad for the 2015 Rugby World Cup.

Murphy scored Ireland's first try in the historic 40–29 defeat of New Zealand – then back-to-back world champions – on 5 November 2016 at Soldier Field, Chicago, but was stretchered off later in the game with what proved to be an ACL injury to his left knee.

Despite returning to the national team, scoring a try in the final warm-up game (against Italy) prior to the 2019 Rugby World Cup, coach Joe Schmidt did not select Murphy as part of the squad for Japan, opting instead to fill the final back-row slot with Murphy's former Leinster teammate, Rhys Ruddock. However he was subsequently drafted into the squad, arriving in Japan on 29 September, following the broken foot that Jack Conan suffered in training. Murphy slotted straight into the No. 8 role for Ireland's 35–0 win over Russia, but was taken off after 27 minutes, with Ireland up 14–0, following a dislocated rib, and was replaced by CJ Stander.

== Personal life ==
Murphy studied business at Dublin Institute of Technology. In 2009, he received Blackrock's sports personality of the year award presented to him by Ireland captain Brian O'Driscoll. He is the grandson of Irish Olympian, Noel Carroll. Murphy became a father with the birth of his daughter, Lily, on 11 December 2020.

== Career statistics ==
As of match played 9 May 2023.

Club	Season	Pro14/Rainbow Cup			Europe			Total		
Club	Season	Apps	Tries	Pts	Apps	Tries	Pts	Apps	Tries	Pts
Leinster	2011–12	6	0	0	0	0	0	6	0	0
Leinster	2012–13	15	3	15	2	0	0	17	3	15
Leinster	2013–14	18	5	25	3	3	15	21	8	40
Leinster	2014–15	11	2	10	5	0	0	16	2	10
Leinster	2015–16	14	2	10	6	0	0	20	2	10
Leinster	2016–17	5	0	0	1	0	0	6	0	0
Leinster	2017–18	15	2	10	6	1	5	21	3	15
Ulster	2018–19	11	3	15	7	0	0	18	3	15
Ulster	2019–20	8	0	0	7	1	5	15	1	5
Ulster	2020–21	12	4	20	4	0	0	16	4	20
Ulster	2021–22	5	0	0	1	0	0	6	0	0
Ulster	2022–23	8	1	5	1	0	0	9	1	5
Career total		128	22	110	43	5	25	171	27	135

== Honours ==
Schoolboys

- Leinster Schools Junior Cup (1): 2006
- Leinster Schools Rugby Senior Cup (1): 2009

Ireland under–20

- Six Nations Under 20s Championship (1): 2010

Leinster

- British and Irish Cup (1): 2012–13
- Pro14 (3): 2012–13, 2013–14, 2017–2018
- European Rugby Champions Cup (1): 2017–2018

Ireland

- Six Nations (3): 2014, 2015, 2018

Individual

- Leinster Young Player of the Year (1): 2012–13
- Pro14 Dream Team (1): 2013–14
