= Heineken Cup 2011 =

Heineken Cup 2011 may refer to:

- 2010–11 Heineken Cup competition
- 2011–12 Heineken Cup competition
- 2011 Heineken Cup Final, the final of the 2010–11 Heineken Cup competition
