= Brendan Macken =

Brendan Macken may refer to:

- Brendan Macken (tennis) (born 1923), former Canadian tennis player
- Brendan Macken (rugby union) (born 1991), Irish rugby player
