= Auva'a =

Auva'a is a surname of Samoan origin. Notable people with the surname include:

- Kirisome Auva'a (born 1992), Samoan-Australian rugby league footballer
- Leo Auva'a (born 1984), New Zealand rugby union footballer
- Onosai Tololima-Auva'a (born 1985), New Zealand rugby union footballer
