= KPNS =

KPNS may refer to:

- Kildare Place National School
- KFTP, a radio station (1350 AM) licensed to serve Duncan, Oklahoma, United States, which held the call sign KPNS from 2003 to 2023
- the ICAO code for Pensacola International Airport
