= Nathan White (rugby union) =

Irish rugby union player

- Born: Nathan White; 4 September 1981 (age 45) Hāwera, New Zealand
- Height: 1.88 m (6 ft 2 in)
- Weight: 122 kg (19 st 3 lb)
- School: Te Awamutu College
- Occupation: Rugby union player

Rugby union career
- Position: Prop
Amateur team(s)
Years	Team	Apps	(Points)
- Te Awamutu
Provincial / State sides
Years	Team	Apps	(Points)
2002–2011	Waikato	73	(5)
2011–2012	Leinster	24	(5)
2012–2016	Connacht	58	(15)
- Correct as of 23 July 2016
Super Rugby
Years	Team	Apps	(Points)
2006–2011	Chiefs	41	(20)
- Correct as of 1 June 2014
International career
Years	Team	Apps	(Points)
2015	Wolfhounds	1	(0)
2015–2016	Ireland	13	(0)
- Correct as of 19 March 2016

Nathan White is a retired rugby union player from New Zealand, who played internationally for Ireland. He played as a prop, primarily at tighthead. White last played for Irish provincial side Connacht in the Pro12, and had previously played for Leinster, another province. Before moving to Ireland, he played Super Rugby for the Chiefs and provincial rugby for Waikato.

== Club career ==
=== In New Zealand ===
White first played rugby for the Te Awamutu Sports Club. In 2002, he joined the National Provincial Championship side, Waikato. White was brought in to play for Super 14 side the Chiefs in 2006. The 2006 Super 14 season saw the Chiefs finish in seventh overall and third from the New Zealand teams. Later that year, White won the 2006 Air New Zealand Cup with Waikato. The Air New Zealand Cup had replaced the National Provincial Championship that season. White started at tighthead prop in the final of the Cup, as Waikato beat Wellington 37–31. White served as the captain of Waikato for two years before leaving both Waikato and the Chiefs to move abroad.

=== Leinster ===
White moved to Irish provincial side Leinster in 2011 on a one-year contract, joining ahead of the 2011–12 season. He played 17 times in the Pro12 that season, nine of these appearances coming from the bench. He scored one try in the competition, this coming against the Cardiff Blues on 2 December 2011. In the 2011–12 Heineken Cup, White made seven appearances, all coming from the bench, as Leinster won the competition.

=== Connacht ===
After his year with Leinster was finished, White joined another Irish province, this time Connacht Rugby. He signed with the team on a three-year contract in February 2012 and joined them ahead of the 2012–13 season. In his first season with the club, White played 16 games in the 2012–13 Pro12, starting 14 of them and scoring one try. He also played five games in that season's Heineken Cup for the province.

In January 2015, Connacht and the IRFU announced that White had signed a two-year contract extension, which would see him play at the Sportsground until at least the summer of 2017. In September 2016, it was announced that White was retiring from rugby with immediate effect, due to ongoing issues from a concussion he sustained in a game against Leinster in March of that year. He had made 58 appearances for Connacht in his four seasons with the side.

== International career ==
In October 2014, White became qualified to play for Ireland through the three-year residency rule. White was named in the Irish squad for the end of year tests, but a bicep injury ruled him out until January. White was one of only two uncapped players included in Ireland's extended squad for the Six Nations. On 30 January 2015, at the age of 33, White made his first appearance for an Irish national team, featuring as a replacement for the Ireland Wolfhounds.

On 15 August 2015 White made his debut off the bench for Ireland in a 28–22 win over Scotland in the second of their 2015 Rugby World Cup warm up matches. A late arrival to international Rugby, in the space of seven months White accumulated 13 Irish caps with four starts, before he was forced to retire in September 2016.
