= Shane Jennings =

Irish rugby union player

- Born: Shane Jennings; 8 July 1981 (age 45) Knocklyon, Dublin, Ireland
- Height: 1.85 m (6 ft 1 in)
- Weight: 105 kg (16 st 7 lb; 231 lb)
- School: St Mary's College, Dublin

Rugby union career
- Position: Flanker
Amateur team(s)
Years	Team	Apps	(Points)
- St Mary's College
Senior career
Years	Team	Apps	(Points)
2000–2005	Leinster	42	(30)
2005–2007	Leicester Tigers	60	(60)
2007–2015	Leinster	163	(75)
- Correct as of 18 March 2018
International career
Years	Team	Apps	(Points)
1999	Ireland U19	4	(0)
2001	Ireland U21	9	(0)
2005–2010	Ireland Wolfhounds	10	(5)
2007–2012	Ireland	13	(5)
2015	Barbarians	1	(0)
- Correct as of 28 May 2015

Shane Jennings (born 8 July 1981) is an Irish former professional rugby union player. He played at openside flanker for Leinster Rugby and Ireland. He was also registered to St Mary's College.

== Club career ==
Jennings impressed for Leinster in the 2004–05 Heineken Cup when Keith Gleeson was injured, however Gleeson returned from injury for the quarter final with Leicester Tigers, having had no previous game time. Leicester had previously identified Jennings as a threat. After the game which Leicester won 29–13, Leicester's retiring openside Neil Back approached Jennings and offered to open contract negotiations. He signed for Leicester for the 2006 season, along with fellow Leinster forward Leo Cullen, winning the English Premiership in 2007 and scoring a try in the final. He re-signed for Leinster on a three-year contract for the start of the 2007/8 season winning the Magners League in 2008 and European Cup in 2009. In October 2009 he was banned for twelve weeks for making contact with the eye area of Nick Kennedy of London Irish in the first round of the Heineken Cup. On 19 February 2015 Jennings announced he would retire at the end of the 2014–15 season.

== International career ==
Jennings's international ambitions were hampered largely due to a surplus of quality Irish back row forwards during his playing career. He was named in the Irish squad for the Summer tour of Argentina and earned his first cap on 2 June 2007. Jennings was called into the Ireland A side that was defeated by England Saxons on 1 February 2008. He wasn't initially named in Ireland's squad for the 2011 Rugby World Cup, but was then called up after an injury to David Wallace. At the World Cup against Russia he scored his only international try. Jennings achieved 13 test caps throughout his career, his last coming against Scotland in the 2012 Six Nations.

== Honours ==
Leinster

- Heineken Cup (3): 2008–09, 2010–11, 2011–12
- European Challenge Cup (1): 2012–13
- Pro12 (3): 2007–08, 2012–13, 2013–14

Leicester

- English Premiership (1): 2006–07

== Outside Rugby ==
Jennings grew up in Cremorne in Knocklyon, County Dublin, but moved to Rathfarnham with his mother Joan(and his two brothers) and her partner Norman Young when his parents separated in the early 1990s.

Jennings earned a BA in Business Studies in Portobello College and an MBA with the Dublin Business School.
