= Jamie Hagan =

Irish rugby union player

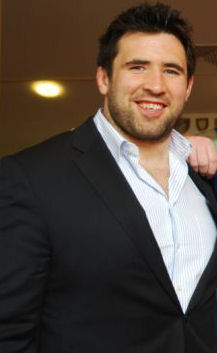
- Hagan in 2012
- Born: James Hagan; 15 April 1987 (age 39) Dublin, Ireland
- Height: 1.91 m (6 ft 3 in)
- Weight: 126 kg (19 st 12 lb; 278 lb)
- School: Gormanston College

Rugby union career
- Position: Tighthead prop
- Current team: Melbourne Rebels
Senior career
| Years | Team | Apps | (Points) |
| 2005–2009 | Leinster | 1 | (0) |
| 2009–2011 | Connacht | 50 | (0) |
| 2011–2013 | Leinster | 41 | (5) |
| 2013–2015 | London Irish | 30 | (0) |
| 2014–2015 | →Leinster (Loan) | 4 | (0) |
| 2015 | Leinster | 4 | (0) |
| 2016 | Rebels | 11 | (0) |
| 2016− | Béziers | 100 | (5) |
- Correct as of 28 September 2022
International career
| Years | Team | Apps | (Points) |
| 2007 | Ireland u20 | 5 | (0) |
| 2011 | Ireland Wolfhounds | 2 | (0) |
| 2013 | Ireland | 1 | (0) |
- Correct as of 8 Jun 2013

Jamie Hagan (born 15 April 1987) is an Irish rugby player. He currently plays for the Béziers. Hagan was capped for Ireland against United States in 2013. His playing position is prop. Hagan is from Balbriggan in Dublin.

== Career ==
Hagan started with the Leinster Rugby Academy. In 2009, he signed for Connacht on a two-year contract, starting at tighthead prop. He played in fifty games for Connacht. He returned to Leinster in 2011. Hagan scored only one try in his three years with Leinster, in a 42–13 win over Irish rivals Ulster.

It was announced on 25 March 2013 that Hagan would be joining Aviva Premiership side London Irish, on a three-year contract, at the end of the 2012–13 season.

It was announced on 17 November 2014 that Hagan is returning to Leinster Rugby on a short-term loan deal.

In 2015 he joined Melbourne Rebels on a two-year contract before joining Bézier a year later. In September 2022 he played his one hundredth game for Bézier.

=== International ===
Hagan has represented Ireland at a Youth, U-18 and U-20 level and also Irish Wolfhounds. He was a member of the 2007 Ireland Under-20 Grand Slam winning squad. In 2013, he represented Ireland against United States in Houston, replacing starting tight-head prop Mike Ross in the match.

== Super Rugby statistics ==
As of 26 July 2016

| Season | Team | Games | Starts | Sub | Mins | Tries | Cons | Pens | Drops | Points | Yel | Red |
|---|---|---|---|---|---|---|---|---|---|---|---|---|
| 2016 | Rebels | 11 | 3 | 8 | 334 | 0 | 0 | 0 | 0 | 0 | 0 | 0 |
| Total | | 11 | 3 | 8 | 334 | 0 | 0 | 0 | 0 | 0 | 0 | 0 |
