= Jamie Heaslip =

Irish and Lions Rugby Union player (born 1983)

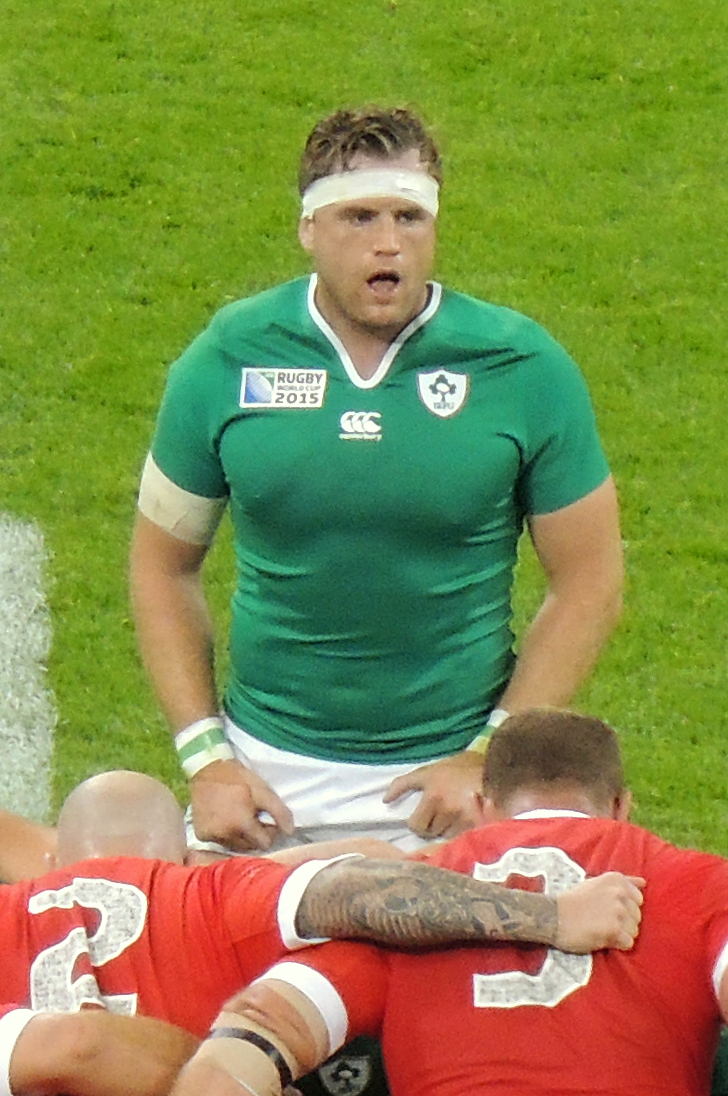
- Heaslip playing for Ireland against Canada during the 2015 Rugby World Cup
- Born: James Peter Richard Heaslip; 15 December 1983 (age 42) Tiberias, Israel
- Height: 1.92 m (6 ft 4 in)
- Weight: 110 kg (17 st 5 lb; 243 lb)
- School: Newbridge College
- University: Dublin City University; Trinity College Dublin

Rugby union career
- Position: Number 8
Amateur team(s)
Years	Team	Apps	(Points)
- Naas
–	Dublin University		
Senior career
Years	Team	Apps	(Points)
2005–2018	Leinster	229	(190)
- Correct as of 7 March 2017
International career
Years	Team	Apps	(Points)
2004	Ireland U21	11	
2006	Wolfhounds	6	(5)
2006–2017	Ireland	95	(65)
2009, 2013	British & Irish Lions	5	(0)
- Correct as of 10 March 2017

James Heaslip (born 15 December 1983) is an Irish former rugby union player who represented Leinster, Ireland and the British & Irish Lions. He played as a number 8. Heaslip earned 95 caps for Ireland during his international career from 2006 to 2017, making him one of the most capped players in Irish national team history.

== Early life ==
Heaslip was born in Tiberias, Israel, while his father, retired Brigadier General Richard Heaslip, was there on duty with UNIFIL. His father was one of the founding officers of the elite Army Ranger Wing (ARW), Ireland's special operations force.

The youngest of four children, he has two brothers and a sister. Jamie and his family moved back to Ireland when he was still young, settling in the town of Naas where he lived until moving to Dublin aged 17. He attended Newbridge College, in County Kildare.

In 2004, he starred in the U-21 World Cup, held in Scotland, where Ireland finished as runners-up to New Zealand. Following his performance, Heaslip was nominated for the IRB Under-21 World Player of the Year award.

== Professional career ==
Heaslip made his Leinster senior debut in the Celtic League in March 2005. Heaslip was named in the first Celtic League Dream Team in 2007 and along with Ben Blair and Felipe Contepomi retained his place in 2008, in 2009 he became the only player to have been named in all three sides and retained his unique record in 2010.

Heaslip scored his side’s only try in the Heineken Cup semi-final in which Leinster were defeated 26–16 by the eventual champions Toulouse.

== International career ==
The first Irish cap he received was in an autumn series test of 2006 against the Pacific Islands. He had the honour of being the 1000th player to wear the green of Ireland. He was a member of the victorious Ireland team that won the 2009 Six Nations Championship and Grand Slam He also was nominated for the IRB International Player of the Year for 2009.

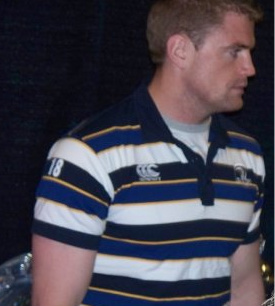
Heaslip in March 2009

Heaslip was sent off for Ireland against New Zealand on 12 June 2010, the first Irish player to be sent off in the professional era, for striking an opposition player (Richie McCaw) with his knee in frustration. He subsequently received a five-week suspension from the International Rugby Board.

Heaslip was selected to captain Ireland against South Africa in the 2012 Autumn Tests, after Brian O'Driscoll, Paul O'Connell and Rory Best were all ruled out through injury.

In January 2013, Heaslip was named by Declan Kidney as the new Ireland captain for the 2013 Six Nations Championship, replacing Brian O'Driscoll who had held the role since 2003.

Heaslip was nominated for World Rugby Player of the Year in 2016, winning the award for Try of the Year against Italy on 12 March in the 2016 Six Nations Championship.

On 26 February 2018, Heaslip announced his retirement from rugby due to injury. He had been due to play for Ireland against England in the 2017 Six Nations Championship on 18 March, but pulled out during the warm-up with what seemed like an innocuous injury at the time. .

=== Lions ===
Heaslip was a member of the British & Irish Lions squad for the 2009 tour to South Africa, where started all three tests on the tour. He was also selected for the 2013 British & Irish Lions tour to Australia.

== Personal life ==
In September 2014 he bought Bellamy's Pub in Ballsbridge with Leinster teammates Rob Kearney, Dave Kearney and Seán O'Brien. After an extensive refurbishment it was reopened as The Bridge 1859. Heaslip opened a new bar called "Lemon and Duke" in the heart of Dublin with a few of his teammates. In 2019 he was added to the RTÉ team of TV analysts for the 2019 Rugby World Cup and in 2021 he was included in the BBC commentary team for the Six Nations Championship.

Jamie is the cousin of Betty Heaslip, who is a current employee of the AFL.

== Honours ==
=== Team ===
Leinster

- Heineken Cup (4): 2008–09, 2010–11, 2011–12, 2017-18
- Pro12 (3): 2007–08, 2012–13, 2013–14
- European Challenge Cup (1): 2012–13

Ireland

- Six Nations Championship (3): 2009, 2014, 2015
- Triple Crown (2): 2007 & 2009
- Grand Slam (1): 2009
- World Rugby Try of the Year: 2016
- World Rugby Men's 15s Try of the Decade: 2010–19

British & Irish Lions

- British & Irish Lions tours (2): 2009, 2013,
- Series Winner (1): 2013

=== Individual ===
- IRUPA Supporters player of the year: 2010
- Celtic League Dream Team 2007, 2008, 2009, 2010, 2011
- IRP Special Merit Award: 2019
- IRP Men’s 15s Try of the Decade: 2020

Nominations

- World Rugby Player of the Year: 2009, 2016
- EPCR European Player of the Year: 2011, 2012, 2013, 2015

Sporting positions
Preceded by Brian O'Driscoll	Ireland captain 2012–13	Succeeded by Paul O'Connell
