= Kildare Place National School =

Location
- 96 Upper Rathmines Road, Dublin; Ireland
- Coordinates: 53.3186°N 6.2636°W

Information
- Enrollment: 201 (2021)
- Website: kildareplace.ie

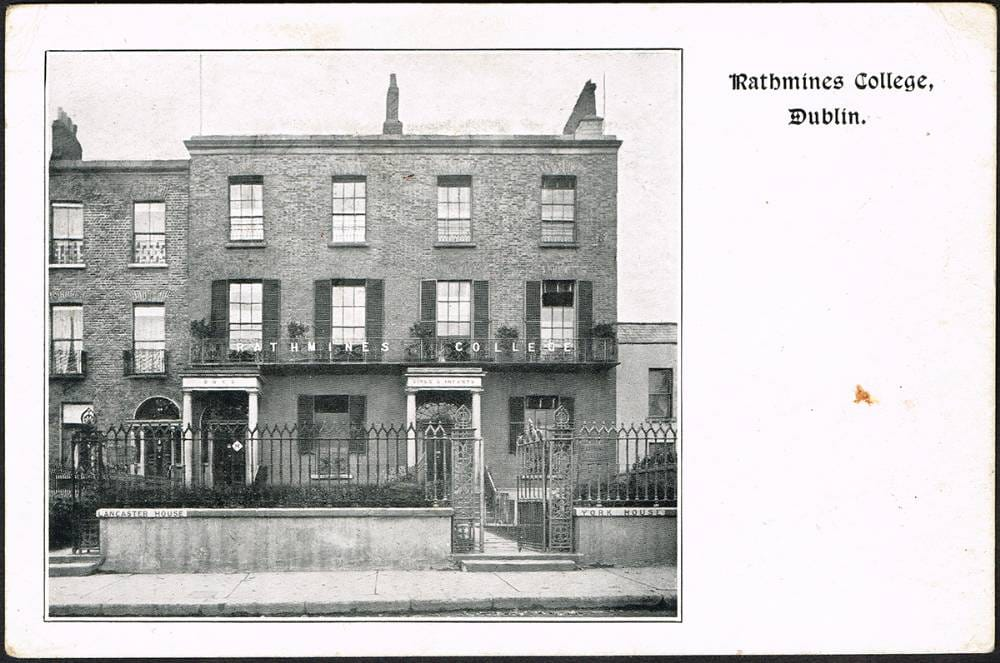
A postcard of the former Rathmines Church of Ireland parish National School at 66-68 Rathmines Road Upper.

Kildare Place National School is a Church of Ireland primary school (a national school) in Rathmines, a suburb of Dublin, Ireland.

The school is linked to the training college of the Church of Ireland College of Education. Originally founded in the 19th century, and formerly located on Kildare Street in Dublin's City Centre, the school moved to Upper Rathmines Road in 1969 when it merged with the former Rathmines Church of Ireland parish National School.

== Notable alumni ==
- Kevin McLaughlin – Former Leinster and Ireland rugby player
- David McMillan – League of Ireland footballer with University College Dublin A.F.C.
- Evan McMillan – League of Ireland footballer with Sligo Rovers FC
- Johnny Sexton – Leinster and Ireland rugby player
