= Cian Healy =

Irish rugby union player

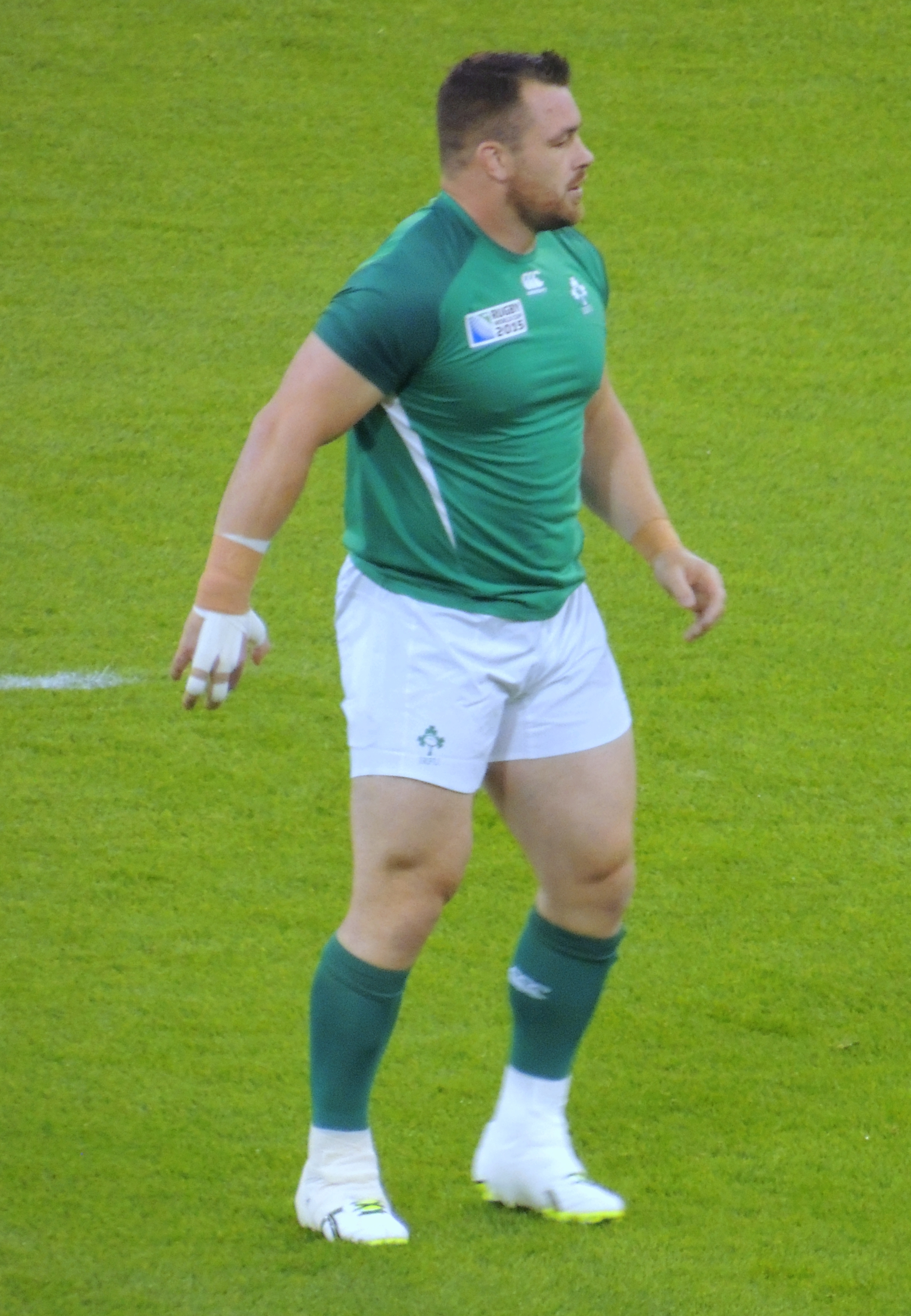
- Healy representing Ireland during the 2015 Rugby World Cup
- Full name: Cian Eoin James Healy
- Born: 7 October 1987 (age 39) Dublin, Ireland
- Height: 1.85 m (6 ft 1 in)
- Weight: 117 kg (258 lb; 18 st 6 lb)
- School: Belvedere College

Rugby union career
- Position: Prop
- Current team: Leinster
Senior career
Years	Team	Apps	(Points)
2007–2025	Leinster	291	(160)
- Correct as of 3 May 2025
International career
Years	Team	Apps	(Points)
2007	Ireland U20	4	(5)
2008–2009	Ireland Wolfhounds	8	(0)
2009–2025	Ireland	137	(65)
2013	British & Irish Lions	0	(0)
- Correct as of 8 March 2025

Cian Eoin James Healy (born 7 October 1987) is an Irish former professional rugby union player who played as a prop for Leinster and for the Ireland national team.

Healy is Ireland's all-time cap leader with 137 caps, having surpassed Brian O'Driscoll's record of 133 in November 2024. Healy is also the most-capped player for Leinster. He retired from international rugby after the 2025 Six Nations.

== Club career ==
Healy made his Leinster debut at the age of 19 during the 2006–07 season against Border Reivers, when he came off the bench. He transitioned to first choice at his position for Leinster in the 2008–09 season. Healy was a part of the Leinster team that won the 2009 Heineken Cup in a 19–16 win against Leicester Tigers.

He was also a part of the 2011 Heineken Cup Final-winning team who beat Northampton Saints 33–22, and followed that up with another Heineken Cup win the following season, 2011–12, against provincial rivals Ulster 42–14.

Healy continued to be an important player for Leinster in the following seasons, but struggled with a series of injuries, nearly retiring in the summer of 2015 after a neck injury. However he managed to return to playing for Leinster, and after losing 10 kilos, regained his position as the first choice in the 2017–2018 season, where he played a key role in Leinster winning its fourth European Cup against Racing 92, along with winning the Pro14 for the first time against the Scarlets. Healy is a member of an elite group of players to have won the European Cup four times, alongside teammates, Devin Toner, Johnny Sexton and Isa Nacewa.

On 4 May 2024, Healy came off the bench in a 20–17 semi-final victory over Northampton Saints for his 111th European appearance, an all-time record. On 28 September 2024, he played a record 281st game for Leinster against the Dragons in the 2024–25 United Rugby Championship.

In February 2025, he announced that he would retire from professional rugby following the conclusion of the 2024–25 season.

Healy playing for Leinster

== International career ==
=== Ireland A ===
Healy was called into the Ireland A side that was defeated by England Saxons on 1 February 2008. On 21 June 2009, he was part of the Ireland 'A' team that won the 2009 Churchill Cup against England Saxons by 49–22 in the final in Colorado.

=== Ireland ===
He was called up to the Ireland squad for the 2008 Six Nations Championship, but did not play.

In November 2009, he made his international debut in the test against Australia at Croke Park, and was praised afterwards by coach Declan Kidney for his performance. Healy also played against South Africa. He made his Six Nations Championship debut against Italy in Croke Park in 2010. Healy also started in Ireland's games against France, England and Wales.

Healy was named Man of the Match in a bruising encounter on 17 September 2011, when Ireland defeated Australia 15–6 at the 2011 Rugby World Cup in Eden Park.

Healy was cited to appear before a disciplinary hearing in London on 13 February 2013, where he received a three-week suspension for stamping on the ankle of opponent player Dan Cole during Ireland's second round encounter with England in the Six Nations Championship.

Healy was a member of the Grand Slam winning Ireland team during the 2018 Six Nations Championship, starting four of the five games including the decider against England in Twickenham. Healy scored a try against France in the final game of the 2020 Six Nations as he reached 100 caps for Ireland.

On 26 August 2023, Healy suffered a leg injury in Ireland's final World Cup warm-up game against Samoa and was omitted from the Ireland squad for the 2023 Rugby World Cup with a recovery period of up to ten weeks.

In November 2024, Healy was named in the bench for Ireland's 2024 Autumn Nations Series fixture against Argentina. This would be his 133rd international cap equalling the national record set by former Leinster teammate Brian O'Driscoll. On 30 November 2024, Healy became the most capped player for Ireland, with 134 caps in a win against Australia. His record breaking appearance coincided with the 150th anniversary game for the IRFU.

In February 2025, he became the all time leading appearance maker in Six Nations for his country during 2025 tournament overtaking Brian O'Driscoll. Later that month, he announced alongside teammates Conor Murray and Peter O'Mahony that they will all retire from international duty following the conclusion of the tournament. On 8 March against France, in his last game for Ireland at the Aviva stadium, he came on as a replacement and scored a try towards the end of the game.

== Personal life ==
Healy has painted portraits of fellow rugby players. He is also a DJ, calling himself DJ Church, performing at both Oxegen 2010 and Oxegen 2011 in the Electric Ballroom with his band partner DJ Gordo.

== Career statistics ==
=== International analysis by opposition ===
Opposition	Played	Win	Loss	Draw	Tries	Points	Win %
Argentina	7	6	1	0	1	5	85.71
Australia	10	6	3	1	0	0	60
Canada	2	2	0	0	0	0	100
England	19	9	10	0	1	5	47.37
Fiji	2	2	0	0	1	5	100
France	17	7	8	2	3	15	41.18
Georgia	1	1	0	0	0	0	100
Italy	13	12	1	0	2	10	92.31
Japan	4	3	1	0	1	5	75
New Zealand	14	5	9	0	0	0	35.71
Romania	1	1	0	0	0	0	100
Russia	1	1	0	0	0	0	100
Samoa	4	4	0	0	0	0	100
Scotland	17	15	2	0	2	10	88.24
South Africa	7	4	3	0	0	0	57.14
United States	2	2	0	0	0	0	100
Wales	16	9	7	0	2	10	56.25
Career	137	89	45	3	13	65	64.96%

as of 10 March 2025

== Honours ==
Leinster

- 4× European Rugby Champions Cup: 2009, 2011, 2012 2018
- 8x United Rugby Championship: 2008, 2013, 2014, 2018, 2019, 2020, 2021, 2025
- 1× European Challenge Cup: 2013

Ireland A

- 1× Churchill Cup: 2009

Ireland

- 6× Six Nations Championship: 2009, 2014, 2015, 2018, 2023, 2024
- 3× Grand Slam: 2009, 2018, 2023
- 5× Triple Crown: 2009, 2018, 2022, 2023, 2025

British & Irish Lions

- 1× British & Irish Lions selection: 2013

Individual

- Most European Rugby Champions Cup appearances: 112
- Leinster Young Player of the Year: 2009
- Leinster all-time caps leader: 291
- Ireland all-time caps leader: 137
