= Leo Cullen (rugby union) =

Irish rugby union player

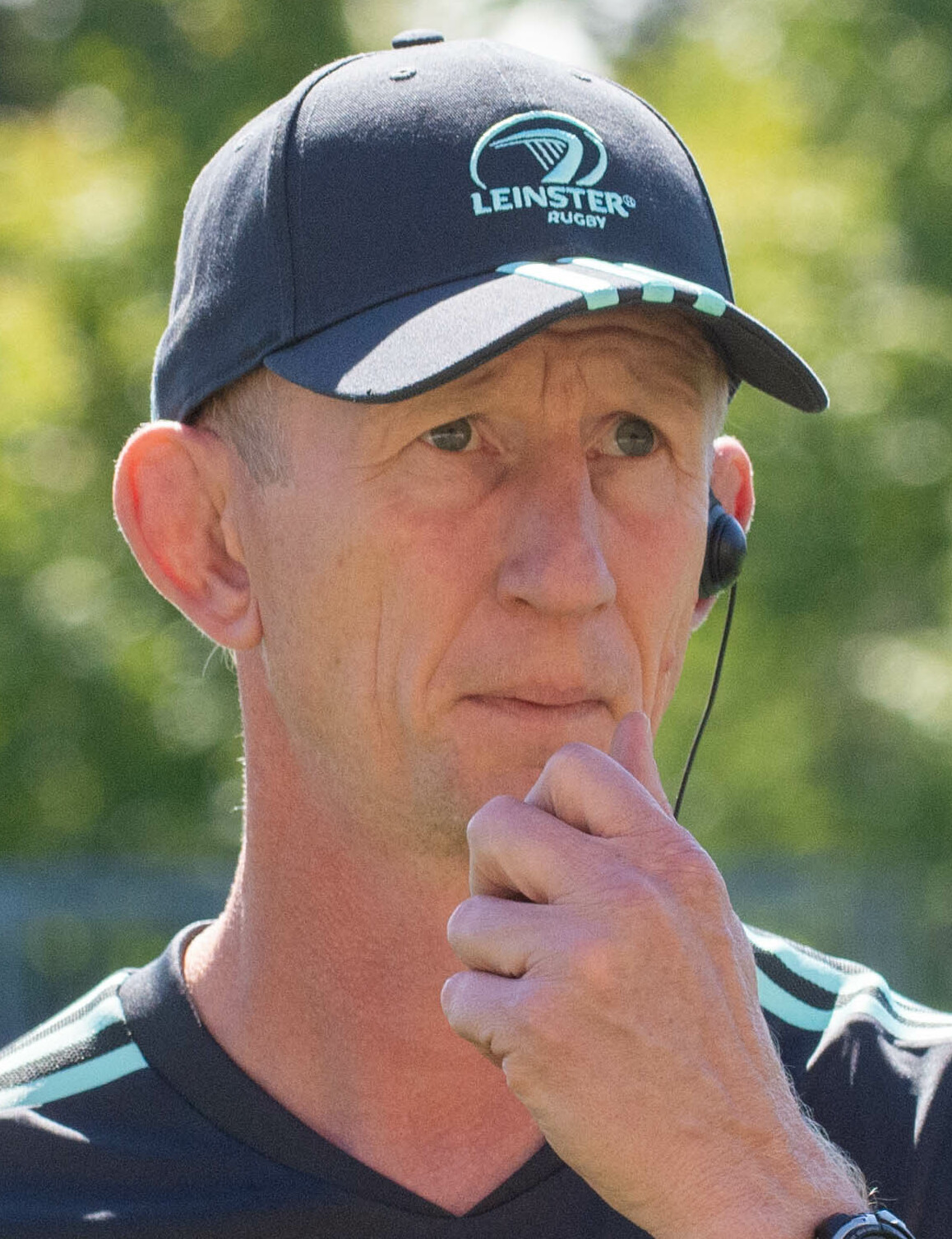
- Born: Leo Francis Matthew Cullen; 9 January 1978 (age 48) Wicklow, Ireland
- Height: 1.98 m (6 ft 6 in)
- Weight: 110 kg (17 st 5 lb; 243 lb)
- School: Blackrock College
- University: University College Dublin

Rugby union career
- Position(s): Lock, Head Coach
- Current team: Leinster
Amateur team(s)
Years	Team	Apps	(Points)
- Blackrock College
Senior career
Years	Team	Apps	(Points)
1998–2005	Leinster	79	(15)
2005–2007	Leicester Tigers	56	(0)
2007–2014	Leinster	140	(75)
- Correct as of 31 May 2015
International career
Years	Team	Apps	(Points)
1997	Ireland U19	4	(0)
1998	Ireland U21	16	(0)
2000–2007	Ireland Wolfhounds	16	(0)
2002–2011	Ireland	32	(0)
- Correct as of 25 September 2011
Coaching career
- Years: Team
- 2014–2015: Leinster (Forwards Coach)
- 2015–: Leinster

Leo Francis Matthew Cullen (born 9 January 1978) is an Irish rugby coach and former professional rugby union player. He played at lock for Leinster Rugby and Ireland. He was appointed coach of Leinster rugby on 19 August 2015.

== Early life and education ==
Cullen was educated firstly at Willow Park which is the junior school to Blackrock College where he attended secondary school. He then studied Agricultural Science at University College Dublin. He graduated in 1999 with a BA in Economics.

Cullen won a Leinster Schools Senior Cup medal in 1995 as well as 1996, when Blackrock beat a Newbridge College team which included Geordan Murphy.

== Playing career ==
=== Club playing career ===
Cullen began his career with Leinster by representing them at schoolboy level in 1995 before moving on to their U20 team where he won seven caps. He also made five appearances on the 'A' team and finally debuted during the interprovincial and Heineken Cup matches of the 1998/99 season.

Cullen moved to Leicester Tigers in 2005 where he made 56 appearances, 15 as captain. He was a part of the squad that won the EDF Energy Cup and Guinness Premiership in 2007. He was also on the losing side in the 2007 Heineken Cup final, when London Wasps defeated Leicester at Twickenham Stadium.

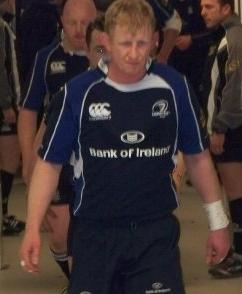
Cullen preparing for a Leinster match at the RDS in 2009.

Cullen re-joined Leinster in 2007 and was part of the squad that won the 2007/2008 Celtic League. On 26 August 2008, he was named as Leinster captain following Brian O'Driscoll stepping down from the role meaning he has captained most of the teams he has played on. He led Leinster to success in their first ever Heineken Cup in 2009, beating Leicester in the final. He also captained Leinster in 2011 to another Heineken Cup victory, and in 2012 became the first person to captain a team to three Heineken Cup victories. He retired in May 2014 after winning the 2014 Pro12 Grand Final.

=== International playing career ===
Cullen has represented his country at all levels, 7 caps at schools level, then captaining the U19 team 3 times in 4 caps. He went on to captain the U21s 14 times in 16 appearances. He also appeared for the U25 team and was capped 16 times at 'A' level Irish Wolfhounds where he captained the team against England.

Cullen made his senior debut against the All Blacks in Auckland in 2002. He became the 100th man to captain Ireland, against Scotland on 6 August 2011.

=== International analysis by opposition ===
Opposition	Played	Win	Loss	Draw	Tries	Points	Win %
Argentina	2	1	1	0	0	0	50
Australia	1	1	0	0	0	0	100
England	2	2	0	0	0	0	100
Fiji	2	2	0	0	0	0	100
France	4	1	3	0	0	0	25
Georgia	1	1	0	0	0	0	100
Italy	4	4	0	0	0	0	100
Japan	2	2	0	0	0	0	100
New Zealand	1	0	1	0	0	0	0
Romania	2	2	0	0	0	0	100
Russia	2	2	0	0	0	0	100
Samoa	1	1	0	0	0	0	100
Scotland	3	2	1	0	0	0	66.67
Tonga	1	1	0	0	0	0	100
United States	1	1	0	0	0	0	100
Wales	3	2	1	0	0	0	66.67
Career	32	25	7	0	0	0	78.13%

as of 17 March 2024

== Coaching career ==
After retiring from playing in 2014, Cullen remained at Leinster as a forwards coach. He then became head coach in 2015.

His coaching colleague, Stuart Lancaster, has described Cullen's strengths as "very high integrity... very good leadership qualities... unbelievable work ethic... very good on the managerial side of things." He is also regarded as effective in bringing out the strengths of coaching colleagues.

Cullen became the first person to win the top European Rugby trophy as a player and a coach, when his Leinster side defeating Racing 92 in the Champions Cup final in May 2018, having already won it three times as a player.

On 22 June 2026, Cullen announced that he would leave his role as head coach of Leinster at the end of the 2026-27 season.

As of 15 June 2025

Club	Season(s)	GP	W	D	L	Win %	Loss %	Championships / Notes
Leinster	2015/16 – Present	289	228	4	57	78.89%	19.72%	European Cup (2018); United Rugby Championship (2018, 2019, 2020, 2021, 2025, 2026); United Rugby Championship Coach of the year (2018, 2022); Irish Shield (2022, 2023, 2024, 2025)

== Honours ==
Leinster

- European Rugby Champions Cup: 3 (2009, 2011, 2012)
- European Challenge Cup: 1 (2013)
- United Rugby Championship: 4 (2002, 2008, 2013, 2014)

Leicester

- Premiership Rugby: 1 (2007)
- Anglo-Welsh Cup: 1 (2007)

Leinster (as coach)

- European Rugby Champions Cup: 1 (2018)
- United Rugby Championship: 6 (2018, 2019, 2020, 2021, 2025, 2026)
- Irish Shield 4 (2022, 2023, 2024, 2025)

Individual

- URC Coach of the Year: 2 (2018, 2022)
- URC Chairman's Award: 1 (2014)
- URC Team of the Year: 2 (2008, 2010)

=== UCD ===
- UCD Alumni Award in Sport 2021
