= Brendan Macken (rugby union) =

Irish rugby player (born 1991)

- Born: Brendan Macken; 19 May 1991 (age 35) Dublin, Ireland
- Height: 1.87 m (6 ft 1 1/2 in)
- Weight: 92 kg (14 st 7 lb; 203 lb)
- School: Blackrock College

Rugby union career
- Position: Centre
Amateur team(s)
Years	Team	Apps	(Points)
- Blackrock College
Senior career
Years	Team	Apps	(Points)
2010–2015	Leinster	46	(30)
2015	→ Gloucester (loan)	4	(0)
2015–2018	Wasps	30	(45)
2018–2020	London Irish	18	(30)
- Correct as of 5 October 2020
International career
Years	Team	Apps	(Points)
2010–2011	Ireland U20	14	(5)
2013–2014	Emerging Ireland	4	(0)
- Correct as of 10 February 2015

Brendan Macken (born 19 May 1991) is an Irish former professional rugby player.

Macken, who played Leinster Schools Cup rugby with Blackrock College, made his Leinster senior debut in an away defeat to Glasgow Warriors in the closing weeks on the 2009/10 season.

Having impressed with the Leinster Academy and with the 'A' side in interprovincial and British & Irish Cup matches, Macken found himself limited to a solitary Magners League match, against Aironi, the following season.

With centres Brian O'Driscoll, Gordon D'Arcy and Fergus McFadden in New Zealand on Rugby World Cup duty with Ireland, the 21-year-old was given the opportunity and he scored a try, and contributed to another, in the 31–10 defeat of Newport Gwent Dragons. His partnership with Eoin O'Malley in the centre gave Blues supporters a glimpse of the future.

The returning Irish internationals made it tough for Macken to hold down a regular spot but he set about delivering for the 'A' side in clashes against London Welsh and Pontypridd. Macken, capped 13 times by Ireland Under-20s, eventually reached the semi-finals of the 'British & Irish Cup,' before the team were eliminated by Munster.

He was recalled to the senior squad in January and February 2012 for three starts in the PRO12 and scored his second ever league try in a comprehensive 54–13 win over Edinburgh at the RDS. He featured in pre-season games in August and scored a last-minute try against Dragons in a bonus point victory.

On 28 February 2015, Macken signed a loan deal to join Gloucester Rugby until the end of the 2014–15 season. On 22 May 2015, Macken signed a permanent deal to join Aviva Premiership rivals Wasps.

On 28 August 2018 it was confirmed Brendan Macken had left Wasps to join then Championship side London Irish.
