= Leo Auva'a =

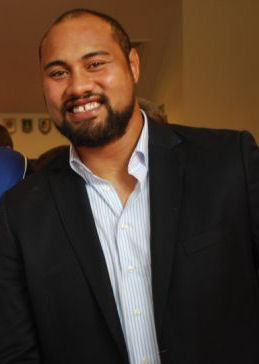
- Born: Leo Auv'a; 16 August 1984 (age 42) Wainuiomata, New Zealand
- Height: 1.93 m (6 ft 4 in)
- Weight: 127 kg (20 st 0 lb)
- School: St. Patrick's College, Silverstream
- University: Victoria University of Wellington
- Occupation: rugby union footballer

Rugby union career
- Position: No.8
Youth career
- Hutt Old Boys-Marist
Senior career
Years	Team	Apps	(Points)
2006–2007	Wellington	0	(0)
2010–2011	Old Belvedere RFC		
2011–2014	Leinster	27	(35)
2014–2015	Benetton Treviso	6	(5)
- Correct as of 14 May 2020

Leo Auva'a (born 16 August 1984) is a former rugby union footballer from New Zealand who last played for Benetton Treviso. After failing to break into the Senior Wellington NPC side, Leo Auva'a left for Ireland after receiving an offer to join AIL side, Old Belvedere RFC.

Leo Auva'a, who won the 2010/2011 'AIL league' with Old Belvedere, featured in 3 of Leinster 'A' games during the 2010/2011 season as an unsigned player. Auva'a was subsequently signed by Leinster in the summer of 2011 as cover for the players departing for the Rugby World Cup. He has since made numerous appearances in the No.8 jersey in the absence of Irish International Jamie Heaslip. To date, Auva'a has played and scored for the senior side and has also appeared for the Leinster 'A' side, including playing in the British and Irish Cup, and in friendlies.

Due to the residency rules set out by the IRB, Leo Auva'a is qualified to play for Ireland.
