= Fergus McFadden =

Irish rugby union player

- Born: 17 June 1986 (age 40) Kilkenny, Ireland
- Height: 1.83 m (6 ft 0 in)
- Weight: 91 kg (14.3 st; 201 lb)
- School: Clongowes Wood College
- University: University College Dublin; Griffith College Dublin

Rugby union career
- Position(s): Centre, Wing
Senior career
| Years | Team | Apps | (Points) |
| – | Old Belvedere | | |
Provincial / State sides
| Years | Team | Apps | (Points) |
| 2007–2020 | Leinster | 184 | (444) |
- Correct as of 4 January 2020
International career
| Years | Team | Apps | (Points) |
| 2004 | Ireland U19 | 7 | |
| 2005–2006 | Ireland U21 | 9 | |
| 2007–2014 | Ireland A | 12 | (36) |
| 2011–2018 | Ireland | 34 | (50) |
- Correct as of 27 March 2020

Fergus McFadden (17 June 1986) is a retired professional rugby union player who played for Leinster & Ireland. He played both as a centre and on the wing.

== Career ==
=== Early career ===
McFadden started playing rugby as a boy when he played mini rugby with Cill Dara RFC in Kildare in the mid 1990s. He then went on to play at Clongowes Wood College.

McFadden was awarded university colours on 17 November 2006 when he played for University College Dublin against Trinity College Dublin in the 55th Colours Match.

=== Leinster ===
He made his Celtic League debut for Leinster versus Cardiff Blues at Arms Park on 28 September 2007. McFadden won the Celtic League in 2008 and the Heineken Cup with Leinster in 2011 2012 and 2018. In total he made 184 appearances for Leinster, scoring 444 points and 29 tries.

On 4 May 2020 he announced his retirement from Rugby. His contract with Leinster was due to expire at the end of the 2020 season, which was cut short due to the Coronavirus pandemic.

=== Ireland ===
McFadden played with the Ireland A's in Denver, Colorado in the 2009 Churchill Cup. McFadden scored two tries in Ireland's victory over Georgia and kicked the conversion for one of those tries on 14 June 2009 at Infinity Park. In January 2011, McFadden was named in the starting team to play against Italy in the opening weekend of the 2011 Six Nations Championship, where he won his first cap. McFadden won his second cap starting against France in the same tournament, scoring his first try for Ireland in the process. On 8 June 2013, McFadden won his tenth cap starting against USA in the Irish tour to North America. Ireland won the game 15–12. On 15 June 2013, McFadden started against Canada scoring a hat-trick. Up to the end of 2018 he had won 34 Irish caps in which he had scored 50 points and 10 tries.

== Honours ==
- JP Fanagan League winner
- Clongowes Wood College Leinster Schools Senior Cup

=== Leinster ===
- Pro14 (6): 2008, 2013, 2014, 2018, 2019, 2020
- European Challenge Cup(1): 2013
- European Rugby Champions Cup (3): 2011, 2012, 2018

=== Ireland Wolfhounds ===
- Churchill Cup (1): 2009

=== Ireland ===
- Six Nations (2): 2014, 2018
