= Ed O'Donoghue =

- Born: Edmond O'Donoghue; 24 June 1982 (age 44) Wimbledon, London, England
- Height: 198 cm (6 ft 6 in)
- Weight: 119 kg (18 st 10 lb)
- School: Marist College Rosalie

Rugby union career
- Position: Lock
- Current team: Reds
Senior career
Years	Team	Apps	(Points)
2003–04	Agen	4	(0)
2004–05	Northampton Saints	5	(0)
2005–06	Worcester Warriors	15	(0)
2007	Ballymore Tornadoes	8	(5)
2008–10	Ulster	45	(0)
2010–11	Leinster	8	(0)
2011–12	London Wasps	11	(0)
- Correct as of 18 May 2014
Super Rugby
Years	Team	Apps	(Points)
2007–08, 2013–2015	Reds	53	(0)
- Correct as of 14 June 2015
International career
Years	Team	Apps	(Points)
2009-10	Wolfhounds	3	(0)
- Correct as of 9 February 2015

Ed O'Donoghue (born 24 June 1982 in London, UK) is an Irish rugby union player.

== Position ==
O'Donoghue's position of choice is as a lock and he can also operate as a flanker.

== Early years ==
He was born in London to an Irish father and an Australian mother, he grew up in Brisbane, Australia

O'Donoghue attended Marist College Rosalie where he was selected to play for Australian schoolboys at rugby union and volleyball, having to pass up the latter due to the requirements of the Australian Schoolboys Rugby Union team.

== Rugby career ==
He earned a place on the Australia under 19s team to contest the Junior World Cup in Chile in 2001.

Searching for top flight rugby experience he played for Northampton Saints and Worcester Warriors in the Guinness Premiership. In 2006 O'Donoghue returned to Australia to take up a contract with his home state team Queensland Reds recruited by then coach Eddie Jones.

O'Donoghue played in the Australian Provincial Championship in 2006 and earned his first Super 14 start in 2007, going on to play all thirteen games in the season.

O'Donoghue joined Ulster Rugby at the start of the 2008/09 season after a two-year contract with Queensland Reds. He went on to represent the province 45 times in two seasons there"

He signed for Leinster Rugby in 2010 on a three-year contract. He was released early from his contract on compassionate grounds and signed for London Wasps on a short-term contract.

He returned to Australia and took up an unpaid training position with the Queensland Reds for the 2013 season playing in every match in their run to the Super Rugby finals and in the process earning himself a full-time contract with the team.

== International Rugby ==
=== Ireland ===
Irish-qualified through his parents he made his debut for Ireland Wolfhounds in February 2009 against Scotland A in the RDS in the 35–10 win.

He was selected for the 2010 Ireland rugby union tour of New Zealand/Australia.

He played two non-cap matches for Ireland against Barbarians and New Zealand Māori in June 2010.
