= Kevin McLaughlin =

Irish rugby union player

- Born: 20 September 1984 (age 42) Dublin, Ireland
- Height: 6 ft 4 in (1.93 m)
- Weight: 17 st 1 lb (109 kg)
- School: Gonzaga College
- University: University College Dublin

Rugby union career
- Position: Back Row
Amateur team(s)
Years	Team	Apps	(Points)
2005	UCD RFC		
–	St. Mary's College RFC		
Provincial / State sides
Years	Team	Apps	(Points)
2007–2015	Leinster	115	(20)
- Correct as of 26 September 2015
International career
Years	Team	Apps	(Points)
2003	Ireland Schools	7	
2005	Ireland u21	5	
2009–13	Wolfhounds	4	(5)
2010–2013	Ireland	8	(0)
- Correct as of 25 Nov 2013

Kevin McLaughlin (born 20 September 1984) is a retired professional rugby union player from Ireland. He attended the primary school Kildare Place National School and was educated at secondary level at Gonzaga College. He played provincial rugby for Leinster and used to play club rugby for University College Dublin RFC until they were relegated to AIL Division 2. His current club is St. Mary's College RFC.

McLaughlin made his debut for Leinster in a Celtic League clash against Glasgow at Hughenden in March 2007, and his Heineken Cup debut against Toulouse at Stade Ernest Wallon in November 2007.

On 17 October 2009, McLaughlin scored 2 tries in a Heineken Cup win against CA Brive.

In November 2009, he made his Ireland A debut in Ravenhill against Tonga XV and was called up to the extended Ireland squad for a test against South Africa.

On 20 January 2010, he was named in the provisional Ireland squad for the 2010 Six Nations Championship, and on 2 February 2010 he was named in the side to make his debut in the Six Nations' opener against Italy at Croke Park.

On 22 September 2015, Leinster Rugby announced McLaughlin's retirement from rugby due to a history of concussions.
