= Rob Kearney =

British Lions & Ireland international rugby union player (born 1986)

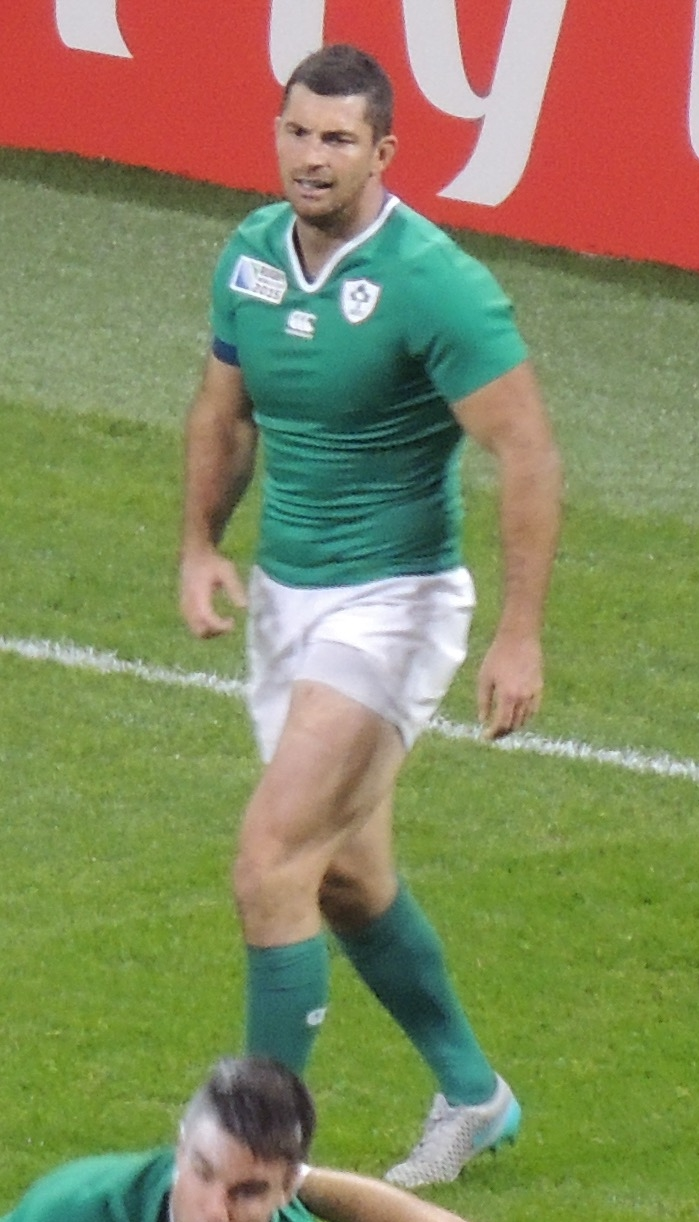
- Kearney playing for Ireland during the 2015 Rugby World Cup
- Born: 26 March 1986 (age 40) Cooley Peninsula, County Louth, Ireland
- Height: 1.85 m (6 ft 1 in)
- Weight: 94 kg (14.8 st; 207 lb)
- School: Clongowes Wood College
- University: University College Dublin
- Notable relative: Dave Kearney (brother) Joe Biden (fifth cousin)

Rugby union career
- Position: Fullback
Senior career
Years	Team	Apps	(Points)
2005–2020	Leinster	219	(238)
2020–2021	Western Force	8	(5)
- Correct as of 11 August 2021
International career
Years	Team	Apps	(Points)
2006–2007	Ireland Wolfhounds	5	(13)
2007–2019	Ireland	95	(82)
2009, 2013	British & Irish Lions	3	(5)
- Correct as of 19 October 2019

Robert Kearney (born 26 March 1986) is an Irish former rugby union player. He spent 15 years playing for Leinster, before having a six-month stint in Australia where he played for Perth based side Western Force. Kearney also played over a decade for the Ireland national rugby union team with whom he earned 95 caps, and went on two British & Irish Lions tours in 2009 and 2013. As a youth Kearney also played rugby union for Clongowes Wood College and Gaelic football for Louth in the All-Ireland Minor Championship.

== Early life and education ==
Kearney was born and raised on a dairy farm in the Cooley Peninsula in County Louth. Like many of his peers, he got involved in athletics at an early age. The dominant sport in the area is Gaelic football. As a youth, Kearney played Gaelic for Naomh Mhuire, and in the Cooley Kickhams underage setup, before graduating to the Cooley senior football team at the age of 17 in 2004 and also Louth at minor level.

Kearney attended Clongowes Wood College in County Kildare for his secondary education. After his Leaving Certificate he moved to University College Dublin, where he studied arts. He graduated in April 2010 with a Bachelor of Arts degree.

== Club career ==
=== UCD ===
Kearney attended University College Dublin on a sports scholarship where he played for the rugby team. He graduated in 2010 with a Bachelor of Arts degree in economics. In 2005 he helped the U-20s team win the McCorry Cup, beating Dublin University Football Club in the final.

In 2018, Kearney was awarded the UCD Alumni Award in Sport.

=== Leinster ===
Kearney played for Leinster at both schoolboy and U-19 level before going onto represent them as a senior. He scored a hat-trick of tries on his debut for Leinster in a pre-season friendly win over Parma.

He made his Celtic League debut for Leinster in 2005 in a 22–20 defeat away to the Ospreys. He made 32 appearances in the competition, scoring eight tries, with three penalties during a period in September 2006, when usual place kicker, Felipe Contepomi was injured. Kearney played in his first Heineken Cup game in a 19–22 defeat against Bath at the RDS on 22 October 2005. It was the first of 10 appearances scoring ten tries in the process. He was part of Leinster's Heineken Cup winning team in 2009 but missed the 2011 final due to injury. On 21 May 2012, the day after Leinster won their second straight Heineken Cup he was announced as the ERC Player of the Year for 2012. During the 2011–12 campaign he started all nine European matches scoring six tries. He was crowned Leinster player of the year for the 2011–12 season.

Kearney confirmed his departure from Leinster on 24 September 2020.

=== Western Force ===
In late September 2020, it was confirmed that Kearney had signed a one-year contract with Australian side Western Force. Kearney made his Force debut in an 11–27 defeat to the Brumbies on 19 February 2021. Kearney announced his retirement from rugby after one season with Western Force in Super Rugby AU and Super Rugby Trans-Tasman. Following his retirement, Kearney returned to Louth GAA club Cooley Kickhams where he began training in August 2021 for the first time since 2005.

== International career ==
=== Ireland ===
Kearney represented Ireland at schoolboy and U-19 level, and toured with Ireland A in the 2006 Churchill Cup.

Kearney was first called into the Irish training squad for 2005's autumn internationals, but didn't play. He was named in the Irish squad to the 2007 summer tour of Argentina and earned his first cap against Argentina on 2 June 2007 in a 16–0 defeat. During the 2008 Six Nations Championship he scored two tries, one against Scotland and one against England. He was a member of the victorious Ireland team that won the 2009 Six Nations Championship, Triple Crown and Grand Slam. One of the most famous incidents in Kearney's career was a high tackle incident involving Italy's Andrea Masi in the first minute of a game. The incident was taken as an indication of the danger posed by Kearney in attack. Kearney missed almost a year – from November 2010 until August 2011 – due to a knee injury that required surgery.

In the 2011 Rugby World Cup, Kearney was selected but was injured for the first game against the United States; however, he played in all the other matches which took Ireland through to the quarter-finals, in which they were knocked out by Wales, 22–10. Kearney was selected in the Ireland squad for the 2012 Six Nations Championship and named in the starting team to play Wales in the opening match. He played in all the other games, which saw Ireland finish third in the table. Kearney was also in the first Irish rugby team in 39 years to beat Australia on Australian soil, in the 2018 summer series. He was named in the Ireland squad for the 2019 Rugby World Cup in Japan, starting three of Ireland's five matches and splitting time at fullback with Jordan Larmour.

=== British & Irish Lions ===
Kearney was named in the British & Irish Lions squad for the 2009 tour to South Africa. He made his Lions test debut as a substitute in the 26–21 first test defeat in Durban. Due to an injury to Lee Byrne, Kearney was selected again for the second test in Pretoria. He scored the only try for the Lions in a 28–25 defeat. He then played in the final test in Johannesburg which the Lions won 28–9.

On 30 April 2013, Kearney was named in his second British & Irish Lions squad.

== Honours ==
Leinster

- European Rugby Champions Cup (4): 2009, 2011, 2012, 2018
- Pro14 (6): 2008, 2013, 2014, 2018, 2019, 2020
- European Challenge Cup (1): 2013

Ireland

- Six Nations Championship (4): 2009, 2014, 2015, 2018
- Grand Slam (2): 2009, 2018

Lions

- Lions tours (2): 2009, 2013
- Series Wins (1): 2013

Individual

- European Player of the Year (1): 2012
- Leinster Rugby Player of the Year (1): 2012
- IRUPA Players' Player of the Year winners (1): 2012

== Personal life ==
Kearney is the third of five children; he has an older brother, Richard, a younger brother Dave (who played for Leinster) and a sister, Sara, the youngest of the five children. His elder brother Ross died following an accident in 1988, aged 6 years. Kearney married Jess Redden in 2021, and their son was born in 2023.

In February 2015, Kearney was announced as the newest brand ambassador for Newbridge Silverware.

Kearney is a seventh cousin of former U.S. President Joe Biden.
