= Dominic Ryan =

Irish rugby union player

- Born: 28 March 1990 (age 36) Dublin, Ireland
- Height: 1.93 m (6 ft 4 in)
- Weight: 106 kg (16 st 10 lb)
- School: Gonzaga College
- University: University College Dublin

Rugby union career
- Position: Flanker
Amateur team(s)
Years	Team	Apps	(Points)
- Lansdowne
Senior career
Years	Team	Apps	(Points)
2009–2017	Leinster	113	(90)
2017–2018	Leicester Tigers	5	(0)
International career
Years	Team	Apps	(Points)
2009–2010	Ireland U20	20	(0)
2013–2014	Emerging Ireland	4	(5)
2011–2015	Ireland Wolfhounds	3	(0)
2014	Ireland	1	(0)

Dominic Ryan (born 28 March 1990) is an Irish former professional rugby union player who last played for Leicester Tigers. He was a back row player, playing at predominantly openside or blindside flanker.

During his first year in the Leinster academy, Ryan made his senior debut for the province in the Celtic League in late 2009. He made his first appearance in the Heineken Cup against Saracens in January 2011, scoring two tries. Ryan was selected as part of the Ireland Wolfhounds squad to face Scotland A and England Saxons, his first call-up to senior international duty.

Ryan was included in the senior national squad for the 2014 Autumn internationals, making his debut starting at blindside flanker against Georgia on 16 November 2014.

On 1 June 2017, it was announced that Ryan had joined English Premiership side Leicester Tigers. In October 2017, having made four appearances for Leicester, Ryan was stood down following repeated concussions. Ryan announced his retirement in September 2018 due to concussion.
