= Eoin O'Malley =

Irish rugby union player

- Born: Eoin O'Malley; 6 July 1988 (age 38) Dublin, Ireland
- Height: 1.78 m (5 ft 10 in)
- Weight: 90 kg (14 st 2 lb)
- School: Belvedere College

Rugby union career
- Position: Centre
Amateur team(s)
Years	Team	Apps	(Points)
- Old Belvedere
Senior career
Years	Team	Apps	(Points)
2009–2013	Leinster	54	(25)
- Correct as of 26 May 2013
International career
Years	Team	Apps	(Points)
2008	Ireland U20	10	(5)
2011–2012	Wolfhounds	3	(0)
- Correct as of 29 January 2012

Eoin O'Malley (born 6 July 1988) is an Irish former professional rugby union player for Leinster. O'Malley played as a centre.

== Career ==
O'Malley played rugby for Belvedere College and represented both Leinster schools and Ireland Schools. O'Malley earned 7 caps for the Ireland under-19 and a further 10 for the Ireland under-20's. He played 3 times for the Leinster under-20 side before joining the first team. O'Malley made his first team debut against Newport Gwent Dragons in the Celtic League in December 2009. He has played 7 games for Leinster in the Celtic League and was named on their bench for the 2009-10 Heineken Cup semi-final clash with Stade Toulousain. O'Malley has also made 4 appearances in the British and Irish Cup for Leinster A. He was forced to retire in the summer of 2013 at the age of 25.
