= Heinke van der Merwe =

South African rugby union player

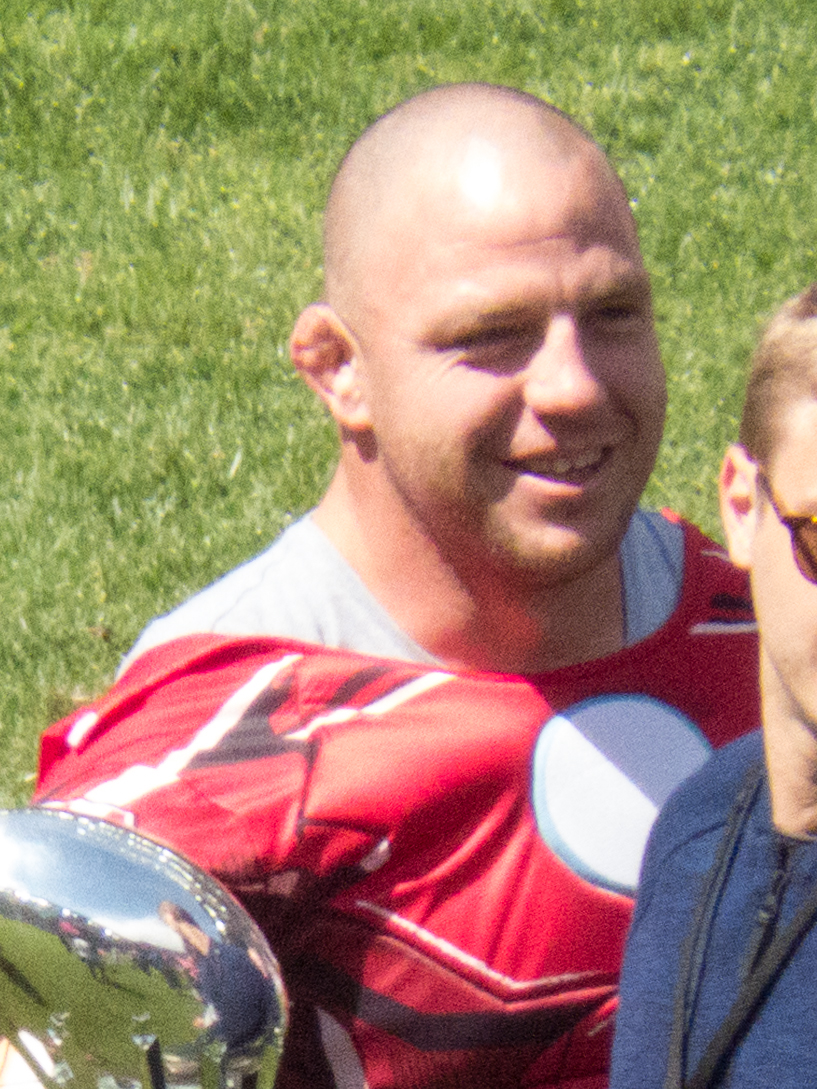
- Born: Hendrik Schalk van der Merwe; 3 May 1985 (age 41) Johannesburg, South Africa
- Height: 1.83 m (6 ft 0 in)
- Weight: 113 kg (17 st 11 lb)
- School: Hoërskool Monument, Krugersdorp
- University: University of Johannesburg
- Occupation: Professional rugby union footballer

Rugby union career
- Position: Loosehead Prop
Senior career
Years	Team	Apps	(Points)
2013–19	Stade Français	84	(5)
- Correct as of 21 December 2019
Provincial / State sides
Years	Team	Apps	(Points)
2005–2010	Golden Lions	40	(10)
2010–2013	Leinster	80	(15)
Super Rugby
Years	Team	Apps	(Points)
2006	Sharks	8	(0)
2007–2010	Lions	44	(0)
- Correct as of 10 November 2012
International career
Years	Team	Apps	(Points)
2007–2015	South Africa	5	(0)
- Correct as of 19 December 2020

Heinke van der Merwe (born 3 May 1985) is a South African professional rugby union player. His first tour with the Springboks was to France, Italy, Ireland & England in late 2009 where he played in one test and two touring matches.

In June 2010, van der Merwe joined Leinster on a 2-year contract, replacing CJ van der Linde at the province.

In November 2012, van der Merwe was called up to the South African squad for their European tour, due to injury cover.

He joined Stade Français Paris for the 2013/14 season.

== Honours ==
- Test debut: 24 November 2007 vs Wales in Cardiff aged 22
- Last test: 18 July 2015 vs Australia in Brisbane aged 30
- Total tests: 5
- Tour matches: 3
- Total Springbok matches: 4
- Win ratio: 4–1–0
- Tours:
  - Wales & England, 2007
  - France, Italy, Ireland & England, 2009
  - Ireland, Scotland & England, 2012
  - Rugby Championship 2015
- SA Under-19 Player of the Season, 2004
- Heineken Cup with Leinster - 2011, 2012
- Pro 12 League winner with Leinster - 2013
- French Top 14 winner with Stade Français - 2015
