= 2011–12 Heineken Cup =

International rugby union competition

Tournament details
- Countries: England; France; Ireland; Italy; Scotland; Wales
- Tournament format(s): Round-robin and Knockout
- Date: 11 November 2011 – 19 May 2012

Tournament statistics
- Teams: 24
- Matches played: 79
- Attendance: 1,172,127 (14,837 per match)
- Tries scored: 320 (4.05 per match)
- Top point scorer(s): Johnny Sexton (Leinster) (103 points)
- Top try scorer(s): Timoci Matanavou (Toulouse) (8 tries)

Final
- Venue: Twickenham, London
- Attendance: 81,774
- Champions: (Ireland) Leinster (3rd title)
- Runners-up: (Ireland) Ulster

The 2011–12 Heineken Cup was the 17th season of the Heineken Cup, the annual rugby union European club competition for clubs from the top six nations in European rugby. The final was held at Twickenham on Saturday, 19 May 2012, kicking off at 5 pm (16:00 UTC).

Leinster lifted the Heineken Cup by defeating fellow Pro12 and Irish side Ulster 42–14. The victory gave Leinster their third Heineken Cup title in four years – a run of success unprecedented in the competition's history.

== Teams ==
The default allocation of teams is as follows:

- England: 6 teams, based on performance in the Aviva Premiership and Anglo-Welsh Cup
- France: 6 teams, based on regular-season finish in the Top 14
- Ireland: 3 teams, based on regular-season finish in the Celtic League
- Wales: 3 teams, based on regular-season finish in the Celtic League
- Italy and Scotland: 2 teams each, based on participation in the Celtic League (although there are only 2 from each nation)

The remaining two places are filled by the winners of the previous year's Heineken Cup and Amlin Challenge Cup. If the cup winners are already qualified through their domestic league, an additional team from their country will claim a Heineken Cup place (assuming another team is available). Accordingly, Harlequins claimed the Challenge Cup winner's berth, and since Heineken Cup winners Leinster were already domestically qualified, the extra Irish berth went to Connacht.

England	France	Ireland	Wales	Italy	Scotland
Leicester Tigers; Northampton Saints; Gloucester; Harlequins; Bath; London Irish; Saracens	Toulouse; Biarritz; Clermont Auvergne; Castres; Montpellier; Racing Métro	Leinster; Munster; Ulster; Connacht	Cardiff Blues; Ospreys; Scarlets	Benetton Treviso; Aironi	Glasgow Warriors; Edinburgh

== Seeding ==
The seeding system was the same as in the 2010–11 tournament. The 24 competing teams are ranked based on past Heineken Cup and European Challenge Cup performance, with each pool receiving one team from each quartile, or Tier. The requirement to have only one team per country in each pool, however, still applies (with the exception of the inclusion of the seventh English team).

The brackets show each team's European Rugby Club Ranking at the end of the 2010–11 season.

Tier 1	(Ireland) Leinster (1)	(France) Toulouse (2)	(Ireland) Munster (3)	(Wales) Cardiff Blues (4)	(France) Biarritz (5)	(England) Leicester Tigers (6)
Tier 2	(England) Northampton (7)	(France) Clermont Auvergne (10)	(Wales) Ospreys (11)	(England) Bath (12)	(England) Harlequins (13)	(England) London Irish (15)
Tier 3	(Ireland) Ulster (16)	(England) Saracens (17)	(England) Gloucester (18)	(Scotland) Glasgow (20)	(Wales) Scarlets (21)	(Scotland) Edinburgh (24)
Tier 4	(Ireland) Connacht (25)	(Italy) Benetton Treviso (30)	(France) Castres (31)	(France) Montpellier (32)	(France) Racing Métro (33)	(Italy) Aironi (37)

== Pool stage ==
The draw for the pool stage took place on 7 June 2011.

Under rules of the competition organiser, European Rugby Cup, tiebreakers within each pool are as follows.

- Competition points earned in head-to-head matches
- Total tries scored in head-to-head matches
- Point differential in head-to-head matches

ERC has four additional tiebreakers, used if tied teams are in different pools, or if the above steps cannot break a tie between teams in the same pool:

- Tries scored in all pool matches
- Point differential in all pool matches
- Best disciplinary record (fewest players receiving red or yellow cards in all pool matches)
- Coin toss

Key to colours
Pool winners, and the two best pool runners-up, advance to quarterfinals.
Third-, fourth- and fifth-highest-scoring second-place teams parachute into the knockout stage of the European Challenge Cup.

=== Pool 1 ===
Team	P	W	D	L	Tries for	Tries against	Try diff	Points for	Points against	Points diff	TB	LB	Pts
(Ireland) Munster	6	6	0	0	14	10	+4	163	118	+45	1	0	25
(Wales) Scarlets	6	3	0	3	12	9	+3	119	124	−5	1	2	15
(England) Northampton Saints	6	2	0	4	18	16	+2	176	160	+16	2	2	12
(France) Castres	6	1	0	5	10	19	−9	111	167	−56	1	2	7

=== Pool 2 ===
Team	P	W	D	L	Tries for	Tries against	Try diff	Points for	Points against	Points diff	TB	LB	Pts
(Scotland) Edinburgh	6	5	0	1	17	11	+6	156	138	+18	2	0	22
(Wales) Cardiff Blues	6	5	0	1	9	5	+4	145	110	+35	0	1	21
(France) Racing Métro	6	1	0	5	13	19	−6	160	190	−30	1	4	9
(England) London Irish	6	1	0	5	7	11	−4	116	139	−23	1	4	9

=== Pool 3 ===
Team	P	W	D	L	Tries for	Tries against	Try diff	Points for	Points against	Points diff	TB	LB	Pts
(Ireland) Leinster	6	5	1	0	18	7	+11	172	88	+84	2	0	24
(Scotland) Glasgow Warriors	6	2	1	3	8	12	−4	106	133	−27	0	2	12
(England) Bath	6	2	0	4	11	15	−4	122	151	−29	0	3	11
(France) Montpellier	6	1	2	3	8	11	−3	84	112	−28	0	2	10

=== Pool 4 ===
Team	P	W	D	L	Tries for	Tries against	Try diff	Points for	Points against	Points diff	TB	LB	Pts
(France) Clermont Auvergne	6	4	0	2	26	5	+21	215	69	+146	2	2	20
(Ireland) Ulster	6	4	0	2	16	8	+8	158	87	+71	3	1	20
(England) Leicester Tigers	6	4	0	2	13	8	+5	123	117	+6	1	0	17
(Italy) Aironi	6	0	0	6	4	38	−34	51	274	−223	0	0	0

=== Pool 5 ===
Team	P	W	D	L	Tries for	Tries against	Try diff	Points for	Points against	Points diff	TB	LB	Pts
(England) Saracens	6	5	0	1	13	10	+3	145	107	+38	1	1	22
(France) Biarritz	6	3	0	3	18	7	+11	143	105	+38	3	3	18
(Wales) Ospreys	6	2	1	3	13	16	−3	142	147	−5	1	2	13
(Italy) Benetton Treviso	6	1	1	4	12	23	−11	122	193	−71	0	0	6

=== Pool 6 ===
Team	P	W	D	L	Tries for	Tries against	Try diff	Points for	Points against	Points diff	TB	LB	Pts
(France) Toulouse	6	4	0	2	16	11	+5	150	105	+45	1	1	18
(England) Harlequins	6	4	0	2	11	7	+4	122	94	+28	0	1	17
(England) Gloucester	6	3	0	3	10	12	−2	111	122	−11	1	2	15
(Ireland) Connacht	6	1	0	5	5	12	−7	68	130	−62	0	2	6

=== Seeding and runners-up ===
- Bare numbers indicate Heineken Cup quarterfinal seeding.
- Numbers with "C" indicate Challenge Cup quarterfinal seeding.

Seed	Pool Winners	Pts	TF	+/−
1	(Ireland) Munster	25	14	+45
2	(Ireland) Leinster	24	18	+84
3	(Scotland) Edinburgh	22	17	+18
4	(England) Saracens	22	13	+38
5	(France) Clermont Auvergne	20	26	+146
6	(France) Toulouse	18	16	+45
Seed	Pool Runners-up	Pts	TF	+/−
7	(Wales) Cardiff Blues	21	9	+35
8	(Ireland) Ulster	20	16	+71
5C	(France) Biarritz	18	18	+42
6C	(England) Harlequins	17	11	+28
7C	(Wales) Scarlets	15	12	−5
-	(Scotland) Glasgow Warriors	12	12	−27

== Knock-out stages ==
=== Quarter-finals ===
7 April 2012
15:00 BST

Edinburgh (Scotland)	19–14	(France) Toulouse
Try: Blair 1' c Con: Laidlaw (1/1); Pen: Laidlaw (3/4) 46', 51', 80'; Drop: Laidlaw (1/1) 38'	Report	Try: Matanavou 30' m Pen: Beauxis (3/5) 5', 19', 28'

Murrayfield Stadium, Edinburgh
Attendance: 37,881
Referee: Nigel Owens (Wales)

7 April 2012
17:45 IST

Leinster (Ireland)	34–3	(Wales) Cardiff Blues
Try: Nacewa 12' c Kearney (2) 30' c, 41' c O'Driscoll 34' c Con: Sexton (4/4); Pen: Sexton (2/3) 8', 23'	Report	Pen: Halfpenny (1/1) 2'

Aviva Stadium, Dublin
Attendance: 50,340
Referee: Dave Pearson (England)

8 April 2012
13:45 IST

Munster (Ireland)	16–22	(Ireland) Ulster
Try: Zebo 34' c Con: O'Gara (1/1); Pen: O'Gara (3/4) 40', 49', 61'	Report	Try: Gilroy 16' c Con: Pienaar (1/1); Pen: Pienaar (4/5) 5', 11', 20', 59'; Drop: Humphreys (1/1) 32'

Thomond Park, Limerick
Attendance: 26,500
Referee: Romain Poite (France)

8 April 2012
16:30 BST

Saracens (England)	3–22	(France) Clermont Auvergne
Pen: Farrell (1/2) 16'	Report	Try: Byrne 43' c Con: James (1/1); Pen: James (4/6) 7', 11', 13', 55'; Drop: James (1/1) 49'

Vicarage Road, Watford
Attendance: 11,047
Referee: Alain Rolland (Ireland)

=== Semi-finals ===
28 April 2012
17:45 IST

Ulster (Ireland)	22–19	(Scotland) Edinburgh
Try: Wannenburg 15' c Con: Pienaar (1/1); Pen: Pienaar (5/5) 5', 38', 58', 63', 75'	Report	Try: Thompson 80' c Con: Laidlaw (1/1); Pen: Laidlaw (4/4) 9', 11', 40', 45'

Aviva Stadium, Dublin
Attendance: 45,147
Referee: Romain Poite (France)

29 April 2012
16:00 HAEC

Clermont Auvergne (France)	15–19	(Ireland) Leinster
Pen: James (5/6) 17', 31', 36', 39', 52'	Report	Try: Healy 41' c Con: Sexton (1/1); Pen: Sexton (3/4) 7', 34', 62'; Drop: Kearney (1/1) 46'; Sexton (0/1)

Stade Chaban-Delmas, Bordeaux
Attendance: 32,397
Referee: Wayne Barnes (England)

=== Final ===
19 May 2012
17:00 BST

Leinster (Ireland)	42–14	(Ireland) Ulster
Try: O'Brien 12' c Healy 31' c penalty try 44' c van der Merwe 76' m Cronin 80' c Con: Sexton (3/3); McFadden (1/2); Pen: Sexton (3/4) 51', 67', 73'	Report	Try: Tuohy 60' m Pen: Pienaar (3/3) 7', 40', 49'

Twickenham Stadium, London
Attendance: 81,774
Referee: Nigel Owens (Wales)
