= 2010–11 Heineken Cup =

Annual rugby union European club competition

Tournament details
- Countries: England; France; Ireland; Italy; Scotland; Wales
- Tournament format(s): Round-robin and Knockout
- Date: 8 October 2010 – 21 May 2011

Tournament statistics
- Teams: 24
- Matches played: 79
- Attendance: 1,139,427 (14,423 per match)
- Top point scorer(s): (Ireland) Johnny Sexton (Leinster) (138 points)
- Top try scorer(s): (England) Paul Diggin (Northampton) (6 tries)

Final
- Venue: Millennium Stadium, Cardiff
- Attendance: 72,456
- Champions: (Ireland) Leinster (2nd title)
- Runners-up: (England) Northampton

The 2010–11 Heineken Cup was the 16th season of the Heineken Cup, the annual rugby union European club competition for clubs from the top six nations in European rugby. It started with three matches on 8 October 2010 and ended on 21 May 2011 with the final at Cardiff's Millennium Stadium where Leinster beat Northampton Saints 33 – 22.

== Teams ==
The default allocation of teams is as follows:

- England: 6 teams, based on performance in the Aviva Premiership and Anglo-Welsh Cup
- France: 6 teams, based on regular-season finish in the Top 14
- Ireland and Wales: 3 teams each, based on regular-season finish in the Celtic League
- Italy and Scotland: 2 teams each, based on participation in the Celtic League

The remaining two places are filled by the winners of the previous year's Heineken Cup and Amlin Challenge Cup. If the cup winners are already qualified through their domestic league, an additional team from their country will claim a Heineken Cup place (assuming another team is available). The only exception is when teams from England or France win both cups, which did not happen in 2009–10.

Because 2010 Heineken Cup winners Toulouse were already qualified for this season's Heineken Cup by virtue of their fourth-place regular-season finish in the 2009–10 Top 14, the extra place for France went to seventh-placed Biarritz (who were also Toulouse's defeated opponent in the Heineken Cup Final). Because Amlin Challenge Cup winners Cardiff Blues were already qualified for the Heineken Cup by finishing second among the four Welsh teams in the 2009–10 Celtic League, the extra Welsh place went to the lowest-placed Welsh team in the league, Scarlets.

England	France	Wales	Ireland	Italy	Scotland
Leicester Tigers; London Wasps; Northampton Saints; Bath; London Irish; Saracens	Toulouse; Biarritz; Clermont; Perpignan; Castres; Toulon; Racing Métro	Cardiff Blues; Ospreys; Scarlets; Newport Gwent Dragons	Munster; Leinster; Ulster	Benetton Treviso; Aironi	Glasgow Warriors; Edinburgh

== Seeding ==
The seeding system was the same as in the 2009–10 tournament. The 24 competing teams are ranked based on past Heineken Cup and European Challenge Cup performance, with each pool receiving one team from each quartile, or Tier. The requirement to have only one team per country in each pool, however, still applies (with the exception of the inclusion of the seventh French team).

The brackets show each team's European Rugby Club Ranking at the end of the 2009–10 season. Aironi inherited the ranking of Viadana, the principal shareholders in the new Celtic League team.

Tier 1	(Ireland) Munster (1)	(France) Toulouse (2)	(Ireland) Leinster (3)	(England) Leicester Tigers (4)	(France) Biarritz (5)	(Wales) Cardiff Blues (6)
Tier 2	(England) London Wasps (7)	(France) Clermont (9)	(Wales) Ospreys (10)	(England) Northampton Saints (11)	(England) Bath (12)	(Wales) Scarlets (13)
Tier 3	(France) Perpignan (15)	(England) London Irish (16)	(England) Saracens (17)	(Ireland) Ulster (19)	(Scotland) Glasgow Warriors (21)	(Scotland) Edinburgh (23)
Tier 4	(Wales) Newport Gwent Dragons (24)	(Italy) Benetton Treviso (28)	(France) Castres (29)	(France) Toulon (30)	(Italy) Aironi (34)	(France) Racing Métro (40)

== Pool stage ==
The draw for the pool stage took place on 8 June 2010.

Under rules of the competition organiser, European Rugby Cup, tiebreakers within each pool are as follows.

- Competition points earned in head-to-head matches
- Total tries scored in head-to-head matches
- Point differential in head-to-head matches

ERC has four additional tiebreakers, used if tied teams are in different pools, or if the above steps cannot break a tie between teams in the same pool:

- Tries scored in all pool matches
- Point differential in all pool matches
- Best disciplinary record (fewest players receiving red or yellow cards in all pool matches)
- Coin toss

Key to colours
Winner of each pool, and best two pool runners-up, advance to quarter-finals. Seed # in parentheses
Third- through fifth- highest-scoring second-place teams parachute into the knockout stage of the European Challenge Cup. Seed # in brackets

=== Pool 1 ===
Team	P	W	D	L	Tries for	Tries against	Try diff	Points for	Points against	Points diff	TB	LB	Pts
(England) Northampton Saints (1)	6	6	0	0	16	7	+9	155	87	+68	1	0	25
(Wales) Cardiff Blues	6	3	0	3	6	8	−2	107	113	−6	0	2	14
(France) Castres	6	2	0	4	10	12	−2	105	115	−10	0	3	11
(Scotland) Edinburgh	6	1	0	5	10	15	−5	98	150	−52	0	4	8

=== Pool 2 ===
Team	P	W	D	L	Tries for	Tries against	Try diff	Points for	Points against	Points diff	TB	LB	Pts
(Ireland) Leinster (2)	6	5	0	1	21	9	+12	179	104	+75	3	1	24
(France) Clermont [6]	6	4	0	2	14	9	+5	114	94	+20	2	1	19
(France) Racing Métro	6	2	0	4	9	17	−8	104	151	−47	0	1	9
(England) Saracens	6	1	0	5	9	18	−9	107	155	−48	0	2	6

=== Pool 3 ===
Team	P	W	D	L	Tries for	Tries against	Try diff	Points for	Points against	Points diff	TB	LB	Pts
(France) Toulon (6)	6	4	0	2	13	13	0	143	134	+9	1	0	17
(Ireland) Munster [7]	6	3	0	3	17	9	+8	143	122	+21	2	2	16
(Wales) Ospreys	6	3	0	3	7	11	−4	117	113	+4	0	2	14
(England) London Irish	6	2	0	4	9	13	−4	107	141	−34	0	1	9

=== Pool 4 ===
Team	P	W	D	L	Tries for	Tries against	Try diff	Points for	Points against	Points diff	TB	LB	Pts
(France) Biarritz (4)	6	4	0	2	16	9	+7	140	85	+55	4	2	22
(Ireland) Ulster (8)	6	5	0	1	15	8	+7	145	93	+52	2	0	22
(England) Bath	6	2	0	4	20	8	+12	147	108	+39	2	4	14
(Italy) Aironi	6	1	0	5	4	30	−26	65	211	−146	0	0	4

=== Pool 5 ===
Team	P	W	D	L	Tries for	Tries against	Try diff	Points for	Points against	Points diff	TB	LB	Pts
(France) Perpignan (3)	6	4	1	1	23	9	+14	196	112	+84	4	0	22
(England) Leicester Tigers (7)	6	4	1	1	25	10	+15	215	118	+97	3	1	22
(Wales) Scarlets	6	3	0	3	16	24	−8	149	191	−42	3	0	15
(Italy) Benetton Treviso	6	0	0	6	11	32	−21	109	248	−139	0	1	1

=== Pool 6 ===
Team	P	W	D	L	Tries for	Tries against	Try diff	Points for	Points against	Points diff	TB	LB	Pts
(France) Toulouse (5)	6	5	0	1	15	6	+10	155	85	+70	1	1	22
(England) London Wasps [5]	6	4	0	2	15	6	+8	145	106	+59	2	1	19
(Scotland) Glasgow Warriors	6	3	0	3	10	15	−5	116	141	−25	0	0	12
(Wales) Newport Gwent Dragons	6	0	0	6	5	18	−13	77	161	−84	0	2	2

=== Seeding and runners-up ===
- Bare numbers indicate Heineken Cup quarterfinal seeding.
- Numbers with "C" indicate Challenge Cup quarterfinal seeding.

Seed	Pool Winners	Pts	TF	+/−
1	(England) Northampton Saints	25	16	+68
2	(Ireland) Leinster	24	21	+75
3	(France) Perpignan	22	23	+84
4	(France) Biarritz	22	16	+55
5	(France) Toulouse	22	15	+70
6	(France) Toulon	17	11	+21
Seed	Pool Runners-up	Pts	TF	+/−
7	(England) Leicester Tigers	22	25	+97
8	(Ireland) Ulster	22	15	+52
5C	(England) London Wasps	19	15	+39
6C	(France) Clermont	19	14	+20
7C	(Ireland) Munster	16	17	+21
–	(Wales) Cardiff Blues	14	6	−6

== Knockout stage ==
The semi-final draw for both the Heineken Cup and Amlin Challenge Cup was conducted on 23 January at the press box of Adams Park in High Wycombe shortly after the London Wasps–Toulouse match.

All times are local times.

=== Quarter-finals ===
9 April 2011
16:30

Perpignan (France)	29–25	(France) Toulon
Try: Planté 51' c Freshwater 73' c Con: Porical (2/2); Pen: Porical (5/8) 30', 37', 42', 62', 68'	Report	Try: Smith 39' m van Niekerk 53' c Cibray 80'+1' c Con: Wilkinson (2/3); Pen: Wilkinson (2/2) 3', 35'

Estadi Olímpic Lluís Companys, Barcelona, Spain
Attendance: 55,000
Referee: Alain Rolland (Ireland)

9 April 2011
18:00

Leinster (Ireland)	17–10	(England) Leicester Tigers
Try: Nacewa 48' m Pen: Sexton (4/4) 3', 15' 36', 73'	Report	Try: Hawkins 76' c Con: Flood (1/1); Pen: Flood (1/2) 5'

Aviva Stadium, Dublin
Attendance: 49,762
Referee: Nigel Owens (Wales)

10 April 2011
14:00

Northampton Saints (England)	23–13	(Ireland) Ulster
Try: Tongaʻuiha 2' c Dickson 55' c Con: Myler (2/2) 3', 56'; Pen: Myler (3/5) 40', 48', 65'	Report	Try: Trimble 32' c Con: Humphreys (1/1) 33'; Pen: Humphreys (2/2) 7', 14'

Stadium:mk, Milton Keynes
Attendance: 21,309
Referee: Romain Poite (France)

10 April 2011
17:30

Biarritz (France)	20 – 27 (a.e.t)	(France) Toulouse
Try: Bolakoro 78' m Pen: Yachvili (5/6) 41', 46', 57', 67', 97'	Report	Try: Heymans 16' c Médard 26' c Nyanga 99' c Con: Skrela (2/2); Bézy (1/1); Pen: Skrela (2/2) 36', 83'

Estadio Anoeta, San Sebastián, Spain
Attendance: 32,051
Referee: Wayne Barnes (England)

=== Semi-finals ===
30 April 2011
15:30 (UTC)

Leinster (Ireland)	32–23	(France) Toulouse
Try: Heaslip 30' c O'Driscoll 59' c Con: Sexton (2/2); Pen: Sexton (6/6) 10', 14', 40'+1', 47', 54', 80'	Report	Try: Fritz 4' c Picamoles 43' c Con: Skrela (2/2); Pen: Skrela (1/2) 37'; Bézy (1/1) 75'; Drop: Skrela (1/1) 11'

Aviva Stadium, Dublin
Attendance: 50,073
Referee: Dave Pearson (England)

1 May 2011
15:00 (UTC)

Northampton Saints (England)	23–7	(France) Perpignan
Try: Foden 14' c Clarke 30' c Con: Myler (2/2); Pen: Myler (3/5) 24', 37', 49'	Report	Try: Guirado 39' c Con: Porical (1/1); Drop: Laharrague (0/1)

Stadium:mk, Milton Keynes
Attendance: 18,231
Referee: George Clancy (Ireland)

=== Final ===
21 May 2011
17:00

Northampton Saints (England)	22–33	(Ireland) Leinster
Try: Dowson 7' c Foden 30' c Hartley 39' m Con: Myler (2/3); Pen: Myler (1/1) 20'	Report	Try: Sexton (2) 43' c, 52' c Hines 64' c Con: Sexton (3/3); Pen: Sexton (4/5) 13', 35', 56', 60'

Millennium Stadium, Cardiff
Attendance: 72,456
Referee: Romain Poite (France)

== Individual statistics ==
=== Top points scorers ===
Final Standings (correct as of 21 May 2011)

Pos	Player	Team	Points
1	(Ireland) Johnny Sexton	(Ireland) Leinster	138
2	(England) Stephen Myler	(England) Northampton Saints	101
3	(France) David Skrela	(France) Toulouse	94
4	(France) Jérôme Porical	(France) Perpignan	86
5	(France) Dimitri Yachvili	(France) Biarritz	80
6	(Ireland) Ian Humphreys	(Ireland) Ulster	72
7	(Scotland) Ruaridh Jackson	(Scotland) Glasgow Warriors	71
8	(England) Dave Walder	(England) London Wasps	70
8	(England) Jonny Wilkinson	(France) Toulon	70
10	(England) Toby Flood	(England) Leicester Tigers	67

=== Top try scorers ===
Final Standings (Correct as of 21 May 2011)

Pos	Player	Team	Tries
1	(England) Paul Diggin	(England) Northampton Saints	6
2	(England) Matt Banahan	(England) Bath	5
2	(Italy) Tommaso Benvenuti	(Italy) Benetton Treviso	5
2	(England) Tom Biggs	(England) Bath	5
2	(France) Thierry Dusautoir	(France) Toulouse	5
2	(United States) Takudzwa Ngwenya	(France) Biarritz	5
2	(Ireland) Johnny Sexton	(Ireland) Leinster	5
8	(England) Ben Foden	(England) Northampton Saints	4
8	(Ireland) Seán O'Brien	(Ireland) Leinster	4
8	(Ireland) Andrew Trimble	(Ireland) Ulster	4
8	(Samoa) Alesana Tuilagi	(England) Leicester Tigers	4
8	(England) Tom Varndell	(England) London Wasps	4

== See also ==
2010–11 Amlin Challenge Cup
