= 2014 Ireland rugby union tour of Argentina =

- Coach: Joe Schmidt
- Tour captain: Paul O'Connell
- Top test point scorer: Johnny Sexton (24)
- Top test try scorer: 5 players with 1 try
Summary
| P | W | D | L |
Total
| 2 | 2 | 0 | 0 |
Test match
| 2 | 2 | 0 | 0 |
Opponent
| P | W | D | L |
Argentina
| 2 | 2 | 0 | 0 |

Tour chronology
- ← Canada & USA 2013 South Africa 2016 →

In June 2014, Ireland played a two-test series against Argentina. This was Ireland's first test series against Argentina since 2007, in which Argentina won that series 2–0. However, Ireland did go into this series on the back of a Six Nations Championship victory, and three consecutive win over Argentina. Including a record winning margin of 22, the last time these two teams faced each other. The tour is part of the third year on the global rugby calendar established by the International Rugby Board, which runs through to 2019.

Ireland won the series 2–0, the first time they had won a test series in Argentina, and won the Admiral Brown Cup for the second time.

== Fixtures ==
| Date | Venue | Home | Score | Away |
|---|---|---|---|---|
| 7 June 2014 | Estadio Centenario, Resistencia | Argentina | 17–29 | Ireland |
| 14 June 2014 | Estadio Monumental José Fierro, Tucumán | Argentina | 17–23 | Ireland |

== Squads ==
Note: Caps and ages are to 7 June, pre first test.

=== Ireland ===
On 19 May 2014, Ireland announced a 30-man squad for their 2014 tour of Argentina.

On 21 May 2014, Paddy Jackson was ruled out of the tour due to injury. He was replaced by Ian Madigan.

On 1 June 2014, Keith Earls and Martin Moore were ruled out of the tour due to injuries. Earls was replaced by Noel Reid, while Moore was replaced by Rodney Ah You. Both these replacements were promoted from the Emerging Ireland side that is participating in the 2014 IRB Nations Cup in Bucharest.

Head coach: (New Zealand) Joe Schmidt

Note: Flags indicate national union for the club/province as defined by World Rugby.

| Player | Position | Date of birth (age) | Caps | Club/province |
|---|---|---|---|---|
| Rory Best | Hooker | 15 August 1982 (aged 31) | 75 | (Ireland) Ulster |
| Damien Varley | Hooker | 29 October 1983 (aged 30) | 2 | (Ireland) Munster |
| Rob Herring | Hooker | 27 April 1990 (aged 24) | 0 | (Ireland) Ulster |
| Rodney Ah You | Prop | 27 October 1988 (aged 25) | 0 | (Ireland) Connacht |
| James Cronin | Prop | 23 November 1990 (aged 23) | 0 | (Ireland) Munster |
| Dave Kilcoyne | Prop | 14 December 1988 (aged 25) | 8 | (Ireland) Munster |
| Jack McGrath | Prop | 11 October 1989 (aged 24) | 8 | (Ireland) Leinster |
| Martin Moore | Prop | 1 March 1991 (aged 23) | 5 | (Ireland) Leinster |
| Mike Ross | Prop | 21 December 1979 (aged 34) | 39 | (Ireland) Leinster |
| Iain Henderson | Lock | 21 February 1992 (aged 22) | 10 | (Ireland) Ulster |
| Paul O'Connell (c) | Lock | 20 October 1979 (aged 34) | 92 | (Ireland) Munster |
| Devin Toner | Lock | 29 June 1986 (aged 27) | 15 | (Ireland) Leinster |
| Robbie Diack | Flanker | 12 November 1985 (aged 28) | 0 | (Ireland) Ulster |
| Chris Henry | Flanker | 17 October 1984 (aged 29) | 14 | (Ireland) Ulster |
| Jordi Murphy | Flanker | 22 April 1991 (aged 23) | 2 | (Ireland) Leinster |
| Rhys Ruddock | Flanker | 13 November 1990 (aged 23) | 2 | (Ireland) Leinster |
| Jamie Heaslip | Number 8 | 15 December 1983 (aged 30) | 65 | (Ireland) Leinster |
| Conor Murray | Scrum-half | 20 April 1989 (aged 25) | 27 | (Ireland) Munster |
| Kieran Marmion | Scrum-half | 11 February 1992 (aged 22) | 0 | (Ireland) Connacht |
| Eoin Reddan | Scrum-half | 20 November 1980 (aged 33) | 54 | (Ireland) Leinster |
| Paddy Jackson | Fly-half | 5 January 1992 (aged 22) | 9 | (Ireland) Ulster |
| Ian Madigan | Fly-half | 21 March 1989 (aged 25) | 8 | (Ireland) Leinster |
| Johnny Sexton | Fly-half | 11 July 1985 (aged 28) | 43 | (France) Racing Métro |
| Darren Cave | Centre | 5 April 1987 (aged 27) | 5 | (Ireland) Ulster |
| Robbie Henshaw | Centre | 12 June 1993 (aged 20) | 3 | (Ireland) Connacht |
| Luke Marshall | Centre | 3 March 1991 (aged 23) | 5 | (Ireland) Ulster |
| Noel Reid | Centre | 22 May 1990 (aged 24) | 0 | (Ireland) Leinster |
| Keith Earls | Wing | 2 October 1987 (aged 26) | 39 | (Ireland) Munster |
| Fergus McFadden | Wing | 17 June 1986 (aged 27) | 26 | (Ireland) Leinster |
| Andrew Trimble | Wing | 20 October 1984 (aged 29) | 55 | (Ireland) Ulster |
| Simon Zebo | Wing | 16 March 1990 (aged 24) | 6 | (Ireland) Munster |
| Felix Jones | Fullback | 5 August 1987 (aged 26) | 6 | (Ireland) Munster |
| Rob Kearney | Fullback | 26 March 1986 (aged 28) | 54 | (Ireland) Leinster |

=== Argentina ===
Argentina 33-man Squad for their June tests against Ireland and Scotland, plus the uncapped match against a South American XV side.

Head coach: (Argentina) Daniel Hourcade

Note: Flags indicate national union for the club/province as defined by World Rugby.

| Player | Position | Date of birth (age) | Caps | Club/province |
|---|---|---|---|---|
| Matías Cortese | Hooker | 1 October 1985 (aged 28) | 4 | (Argentina) Liceo Naval |
| Santiago Iglesias | Hooker | 26 May 1993 (aged 21) | 5 | (Argentina) Uni Tucumán |
| Julián Montoya | Hooker | 29 October 1993 (aged 20) | 1 | (Argentina) Newman |
| Tetaz Chaparro | Prop | 6 November 1989 (aged 24) | 4 | (Argentina) La Plata |
| Matías Díaz | Prop | 16 March 1993 (aged 21) | 6 | (New Zealand) Highlanders |
| Ramiro Herrera | Prop | 14 February 1989 (aged 25) | 0 | (France) Castres |
| Lucas Noguera Paz | Prop | 10 May 1993 (aged 21) | 1 | (Argentina) Lince R.C. |
| Bruno Postiglioni | Prop | 8 April 1987 (aged 27) | 9 | (Argentina) La Plata |
| Matías Alemanno | Lock | 5 December 1991 (aged 22) | 1 | (Argentina) Tablada |
| Manuel Carizza | Lock | 23 August 1984 (aged 29) | 40 | (South Africa) Stormers |
| Tomás Lavanini | Lock | 22 January 1993 (aged 21) | 4 | (Argentina) Hindú |
| Lucas Ponce | Lock | 3 September 1990 (aged 23) | 1 | (Argentina) CUBA |
| Rodrigo Báez | Flanker | 8 February 1989 (aged 25) | 8 | (Argentina) Liceo Naval |
| Lisandro Ahualli de Chazal | Flanker | 29 December 1988 (aged 25) | 3 | (Argentina) Uni Tucumán |
| Javier Ortega Desio | Flanker | 14 June 1990 (aged 23) | 4 | (Argentina) Estudiantes (P) |
| Tomás de la Vega | Flanker | 28 September 1990 (aged 23) | 9 | (Argentina) CUBA |
| Antonio Ahualli de Chazal | Number 8 | 6 September 1987 (aged 26) | 1 | (Argentina) San Isidro |
| Benjamín Macome | Number 8 | 10 January 1986 (aged 28) | 17 | (France) Stade Français |
| Tomás Cubelli | Scrum-half | 12 June 1989 (aged 24) | 22 | (Argentina) Belgrano |
| Felipe Ezcurra | Scrum-half | 15 April 1993 (aged 21) | 1 | (Argentina) Hindú |
| Martín Landajo (c) | Scrum-half | 14 June 1988 (aged 25) | 27 | (Argentina) C.A.S.I. |
| Santiago González Iglesias | Fly-half | 16 June 1988 (aged 25) | 4 | (Argentina) Alumni |
| Nicolás Sánchez | Fly-half | 26 October 1988 (aged 25) | 17 | (France) Bordeaux Bègles |
| Gabriel Ascárate | Centre | 20 October 1987 (aged 26) | 11 | (Scotland) Glasgow Warriors |
| Jerónimo de la Fuente | Centre | 24 February 1991 (aged 23) | 1 | (Argentina) Duendes |
| Matías Moroni | Centre | 29 March 1991 (aged 23) | 0 | (Argentina) CUBA |
| Javier Rojas | Centre | 15 April 1991 (aged 23) | 4 | (Argentina) Uni Tucumán |
| Manuel Montero | Wing | 20 November 1991 (aged 22) | 10 | (Argentina) Pucará |
| Ramiro Moyano | Wing | 28 May 1990 (aged 24) | 5 | (Argentina) Lince R.C. |
| Matías Orlando | Wing | 14 November 1991 (aged 22) | 7 | (Argentina) Huirapuca |
| Lucas González Amorosino | Fullback | 2 November 1985 (aged 28) | 29 | (France) Oyonnax |
| Santiago Cordero | Fullback | 6 December 1993 (aged 20) | 4 | (Argentina) Regatas |
| Joaquín Tuculet | Fullback | 8 August 1989 (aged 24) | 7 | (France) Bordeaux Bègles |

== Matches ==
=== First Test ===
7 June 2014
15:40 ART (UTC-03)

| Argentina | 17–29 | Ireland |
| Try: Montero 30' c De la Vega 78' c Con: Sánchez (1/1) 31'; González Iglesias (1/1) 79'; Pen: Sánchez (1/2) 26' | Report | Try: Henry 34' m Sexton 42' m Trimble 57' c Con: Sexton (1/3) 58'; Pen: Sexton (2/2) 9', 18'; Madigan (2/2) 67', 70' |

Estadio Centenario, Resistencia
Referee: Glen Jackson (New Zealand)

Team details

| Argentina | Ireland |

| FB | 15 | Joaquín Tuculet | | | (substituted off) 73' |
| RW | 14 | Santiago Cordero | | (substituted off) 64' | (substituted in) 73' |
| OC | 13 | Jerónimo de la Fuente |
| IC | 12 | Gabriel Ascárate |
| LW | 11 | Manuel Montero |
| FH | 10 | Nicolás Sánchez | | (substituted off) 69' |
| SH | 9 | Martín Landajo (c) | | (substituted off) 63' |
| N8 | 8 | Benjamín Macome | (yellow card) 28' to 38' |
| OF | 7 | Tomás de la Vega |
| BF | 6 | Rodrigo Baez | | (substituted off) 63' |
| RL | 5 | Tomás Lavanini |
| LL | 4 | Manuel Carizza | | (substituted off) 40' |
| TP | 3 | Ramiro Herrera | | (substituted off) 56' |
| HK | 2 | Matías Cortese | | (substituted off) 58' |
| LP | 1 | Lucas Noguera Paz | | (substituted off) 75' |
Replacements:
| HK | 16 | Julián Montoya | | (substituted in) 58' |
| PR | 17 | Bruno Postiglioni | | (substituted in) 75' |
| PR | 18 | Tetaz Chaparro | | (substituted in) 56' |
| LK | 19 | Matías Alemanno | | (substituted in) 40' |
| FL | 20 | Javier Ortega Desio | | (substituted in) 63' |
| SH | 21 | Tomás Cubelli | | (substituted in) 63' |
| FH | 22 | Santiago González Iglesias | | (substituted in) 69' |
| FB | 23 | Lucas González Amorosino | | (substituted in) 64' |
Coach:
(Argentina) Daniel Hourcade

| FB | 15 | Felix Jones |
| RW | 14 | Andrew Trimble |
| OC | 13 | Darren Cave |
| IC | 12 | Luke Marshall | (substituted off) 56' |
| LW | 11 | Simon Zebo |
| FH | 10 | Johnny Sexton | (substituted off) 63' |
| SH | 9 | Conor Murray | (substituted off) 58' |
| N8 | 8 | Jordi Murphy | (substituted off) 58' |
| OF | 7 | Chris Henry |
| BF | 6 | Robbie Diack |
| RL | 5 | Paul O'Connell (c) | (substituted off) 67' |
| LL | 4 | Iain Henderson |
| TP | 3 | Mike Ross | (substituted off) 67' |
| HK | 2 | Rory Best | (substituted off) 67' |
| LP | 1 | Jack McGrath | (substituted off) 60' |
Replacements:
| HK | 16 | Damien Varley | (substituted in) 67' |
| PR | 17 | Dave Kilcoyne | (substituted in) 60' |
| PR | 18 | Rodney Ah You | (substituted in) 67' |
| LK | 19 | Devin Toner | (substituted in) 67' |
| N8 | 20 | Jamie Heaslip | (substituted in) 58' |
| SH | 21 | Kieran Marmion | (substituted in) 58' |
| FH | 22 | Ian Madigan | (substituted in) 63' |
| WG | 23 | Fergus McFadden | (substituted in) 56' |
Coach:
(New Zealand) Joe Schmidt

Touch judges:
Mike Fraser (New Zealand)
Jaco van Heerden (South Africa)
Television match official:
Shaun Veldsman (South Africa)

Notes:

- Ramiro Herrera made his international debut for Argentina.
- Rodney Ah You, Robbie Diack and Kieran Marmion made their international debuts for Ireland.
- This was Ireland's first victory over Argentina, when playing on Argentine soil, in a fully test capped match.

=== Second Test ===
14 June 2014
15:40 ART (UTC-03)

| Argentina | 17–23 | Ireland |
| Try: Tuculet 24' c González Amorosino 79' c Con: Sánchez (1/1) 25'; González Iglesias (1/1) 79'; Pen: Sánchez (1/1) 16' | Report | Try: Zebo 50' c Madigan 72' c Con: Sexton (1/1) 51'; Madigan (1/1) 73'; Pen: Sexton (3/5) 4', 9', 31' |

Monumental José Fierro, Tucumán
Referee: Pascal Gaüzère (France)

Team details

| Argentina | Ireland |

| FB | 15 | Joaquín Tuculet | | 55' to 65' |
| RW | 14 | Lucas González Amorosino |
| OC | 13 | Jerónimo de la Fuente |
| IC | 12 | Gabriel Ascárate | | (substituted off) 60' |
| LW | 11 | Manuel Montero |
| FH | 10 | Nicolás Sánchez | | | (substituted off) 65' |
| SH | 9 | Martín Landajo (c) | | (substituted off) 63' |
| N8 | 8 | Antonio Ahualli de Chazal | | (substituted off) 11' | (substituted in) 19' | (substituted off) 63' |
| OF | 7 | Tomás de la Vega |
| BF | 6 | Rodrigo Báez |
| RL | 5 | Tomás Lavanini | | (substituted off) 69' |
| LL | 4 | Manuel Carizza |
| TP | 3 | Ramiro Herrera | | (substituted off) 51' | (substituted in) 68' |
| HK | 2 | Matías Cortese | (yellow card) 8' to 18' | | | (substituted off) 26' |
| LP | 1 | Lucas Noguera Paz | | | (substituted off) 68' |
Replacements:
| HK | 16 | Santiago Iglesias | | (substituted in) 11' | (substituted off) 19' | (substituted in) 26' | (substituted off) 63' |
| PR | 17 | Bruno Postiglioni | | | | | (substituted in) 63' |
| PR | 18 | Matías Díaz | | (substituted in) 51' |
| LK | 19 | Matías Alemanno | | (substituted in) 69' |
| FL | 20 | Javier Ortega Desio | | | | (substituted in) 63' |
| SH | 21 | Tomás Cubelli | | (substituted in) 63' |
| FB | 22 | Santiago González Iglesias | | (substituted in) 60' |
| WG | 23 | Matías Orlando | | (substituted in) 55' |
Coach:
(Argentina) Daniel Hourcade

| FB | 15 | Rob Kearney |
| RW | 14 | Andrew Trimble | (yellow card) 15' to 25' |
| OC | 13 | Fergus McFadden |
| IC | 12 | Darren Cave | | (substituted off) 73' |
| LW | 11 | Simon Zebo |
| FH | 10 | Johnny Sexton | | (substituted off) 64' |
| SH | 9 | Eoin Reddan | | (substituted off) 77' |
| N8 | 8 | Jamie Heaslip |
| OF | 7 | Chris Henry | | (substituted off) 63' |
| BF | 6 | Rhys Ruddock |
| RL | 5 | Paul O'Connell (c) |
| LL | 4 | Devin Toner | | (substituted off) 42' |
| TP | 3 | Mike Ross | | (substituted off) 73' |
| HK | 2 | Rory Best | | (substituted off) 73' |
| LP | 1 | Dave Kilcoyne | | (substituted off) 57' |
Replacements:
| HK | 16 | Rob Herring | | (substituted in) 77' |
| PR | 17 | James Cronin | | (substituted in) 73' |
| PR | 18 | Jack McGrath | | (substituted in) 57' |
| LK | 19 | Iain Henderson | | (substituted in) 42' |
| FL | 20 | Jordi Murphy | | (substituted in) 63' |
| SH | 21 | Kieran Marmion | | (substituted in) 77' |
| FH | 22 | Ian Madigan | | (substituted in) 64' |
| CE | 23 | Noel Reid | | (substituted in) 73' |
Coach:
(New Zealand) Joe Schmidt

Touch judges:
Glen Jackson (New Zealand)
John Lacey (Ireland)
Television match official:
Shaun Veldsman (South Africa)

Notes:

- James Cronin, Rob Herring and Noel Reid made their international debuts for Ireland.
- This was Ireland's first test series victory over Argentina, and with it, they retain the Admiral Brown Cup.

== Statistics ==
Key

- Con: Conversions
- Pen: Penalties
- DG: Drop goals
- Pts: Points

=== Tour statistics ===
| Name | Played | Tries | Con | Pen | DG | Pts | Temporarily suspended | Sent off (straight red) |
|---|---|---|---|---|---|---|---|---|
| Johnny Sexton | 2 | 1 | 2 | 5 | 0 | 24 | – | – |
| Ian Madigan | 2 | 1 | 1 | 2 | 0 | 13 | – | – |
| Jordi Murphy | 2 | 1 | 0 | 0 | 0 | 5 | – | – |
| Andrew Trimble | 2 | 1 | 0 | 0 | 0 | 5 | 1 | – |
| Simon Zebo | 2 | 1 | 0 | 0 | 0 | 5 | – | – |
| Rory Best | 2 | 0 | 0 | 0 | 0 | 0 | – | – |
| Darren Cave | 2 | 0 | 0 | 0 | 0 | 0 | – | – |
| Jamie Heaslip | 2 | 0 | 0 | 0 | 0 | 0 | – | – |
| Iain Henderson | 2 | 0 | 0 | 0 | 0 | 0 | – | – |
| Chris Henry | 2 | 0 | 0 | 0 | 0 | 0 | – | – |
| Dave Kilcoyne | 2 | 0 | 0 | 0 | 0 | 0 | – | – |
| Kieran Marmion | 2 | 0 | 0 | 0 | 0 | 0 | – | – |
| Fergus McFadden | 2 | 0 | 0 | 0 | 0 | 0 | – | – |
| Jack McGrath | 2 | 0 | 0 | 0 | 0 | 0 | – | – |
| Paul O'Connell | 2 | 0 | 0 | 0 | 0 | 0 | – | – |
| Mike Ross | 2 | 0 | 0 | 0 | 0 | 0 | – | – |
| Devin Toner | 2 | 0 | 0 | 0 | 0 | 0 | – | – |
| Rodney Ah You | 1 | 0 | 0 | 0 | 0 | 0 | – | – |
| James Cronin | 1 | 0 | 0 | 0 | 0 | 0 | – | – |
| Robbie Diack | 1 | 0 | 0 | 0 | 0 | 0 | – | – |
| Rob Herring | 1 | 0 | 0 | 0 | 0 | 0 | – | – |
| Felix Jones | 1 | 0 | 0 | 0 | 0 | 0 | – | – |
| Rob Kearney | 1 | 0 | 0 | 0 | 0 | 0 | – | – |
| Luke Marshall | 1 | 0 | 0 | 0 | 0 | 0 | – | – |
| Conor Murray | 1 | 0 | 0 | 0 | 0 | 0 | – | – |
| Eoin Reddan | 1 | 0 | 0 | 0 | 0 | 0 | – | – |
| Noel Reid | 1 | 0 | 0 | 0 | 0 | 0 | – | – |
| Rhys Ruddock | 1 | 0 | 0 | 0 | 0 | 0 | – | – |
| Damien Varley | 1 | 0 | 0 | 0 | 0 | 0 | – | – |
| Keith Earls | – | – | – | – | – | 0 | – | – |
| Robbie Henshaw | – | – | – | – | – | 0 | – | – |
| Paddy Jackson | – | – | – | – | – | 0 | – | – |
| Martin Moore | – | – | – | – | – | 0 | – | – |

=== Test series statistics ===
| Name | Team | Tries | Con | Pen | DG | Pts |
|---|---|---|---|---|---|---|
| Johnny Sexton | Ireland | 1 | 2 | 6 | 0 | 24 |
| Ian Madigan | Ireland | 1 | 1 | 2 | 0 | 13 |
| Nicolás Sánchez | Argentina | 0 | 2 | 2 | 0 | 10 |
| Lucas González Amorosino | Argentina | 1 | 0 | 0 | 0 | 5 |
| Chris Henry | Ireland | 1 | 0 | 0 | 0 | 5 |
| Manuel Montero | Argentina | 1 | 0 | 0 | 0 | 5 |
| Andrew Trimble | Ireland | 1 | 0 | 0 | 0 | 5 |
| Joaquín Tuculet | Argentina | 1 | 0 | 0 | 0 | 5 |
| Tomás de la Vega | Argentina | 1 | 0 | 0 | 0 | 5 |
| Simon Zebo | Ireland | 1 | 0 | 0 | 0 | 5 |
| Santiago González Iglesias | Argentina | 0 | 2 | 0 | 0 | 4 |
