= 2013 Ireland rugby union tour of Canada and United States =

- Coach: Les Kiss
- Tour captain: Peter O'Mahony
- Top test point scorer: Ian Madigan (21)
- Top test try scorer: Fergus McFadden (3)
Summary
P	W	D	L
Total
2	2	0	0
Test match
2	2	0	0
Opponent
P	W	D	L
Canada
1	1	0	0
United States
1	1	0	0

Tour chronology
- ← New Zealand 2012 Argentina 2014 →

In June 2013, Ireland toured North America, playing test matches against Canada and the United States. The tour was part of the second year of the global rugby calendar established by World Rugby (known as the International Rugby Board prior to November 2014), which will run until 2019, with Ireland helping to expand Test opportunities for Tier 2 nations in 2013.

== Fixtures ==
Date	Venue	Home	Score	Away
8 June 2013	BBVA Compass Stadium, Houston	United States	12–15	Ireland
15 June 2013	BMO Field, Toronto	Canada	14–40	Ireland

== Matches ==
=== United States ===
8 June 2013
19:30 CDT (UTC-5)

United States	12–15	Ireland
Pen: Wyles (4/5) 25', 32', 57', 65'	Report	Pen: Madigan (5/7) 9', 17', 30', 39', 53'

BBVA Compass Stadium, Houston
Attendance: 20,181
Referee: Francisco Pastrana (Argentina)

FB	15	Chris Wyles
RW	14	Luke Hume		(substituted off) 61'
OC	13	Seamus Kelly
IC	12	Andrew Suniula
LW	11	Takudzwa Ngwenya
FH	10	Toby L'Estrange
SH	9	Mike Petri
N8	8	Todd Clever (c)	(yellow card) 52' to 62'
OF	7	Scott LaValla
BF	6	Samu Manoa
RL	5	Louis Stanfill
LL	4	Brian Doyle		12' to 25'
TP	3	Eric Fry
HK	2	Chris Biller
LP	1	Shawn Pittman
Replacements:
HK	16	Zach Fenoglio
PR	17	Nicholas Wallace
PR	18	Phil Thiel
LK	19	Peter Dahl		(substituted in) 12'	(substituted off) 25'
FL	20	John Quill
SH	21	Robbie Shaw
WG	22	James Paterson		(substituted in) 61'
FH	23	Adam Siddall
Coach:
(United States) Mike Tolkin

FB	15	Robbie Henshaw
RW	14	Fergus McFadden	35' to 40'
OC	13	Darren Cave
IC	12	Stuart Olding
LW	11	Simon Zebo
FH	10	Ian Madigan
SH	9	Isaac Boss	(substituted off) 71'
N8	8	Peter O'Mahony (c)
OF	7	Chris Henry	51' to 58'		(substituted off) 76'
BF	6	Iain Henderson
RL	5	Devin Toner
LL	4	Mike McCarthy	(substituted off) 76'
TP	3	Mike Ross	(substituted off) 54'
HK	2	Richardt Strauss	(substituted off) 76'
LP	1	Dave Kilcoyne	(substituted off) 58'
Replacements:
HK	16	Mike Sherry	(substituted in) 76'
PR	17	Jamie Hagan	(substituted in) 54'
PR	18	Tom Court	(substituted in) 58'
LK	19	Dan Tuohy	(substituted in) 76'
FL	20	Tommy O'Donnell	(substituted in) 51'	(substituted off) 58'	(substituted in) 76'
SH	21	Paul Marshall	(substituted in) 71'
FH	22	Paddy Jackson
WG	23	Felix Jones	(substituted in) 35'	(substituted off) 40'
Coach:
(Australia) Les Kiss

Man of the Match:
Ian Madigan (Ireland)

Touch judges:
Bryan Arciero (Canada)
Chris Assmus (Canada)

Notes:

- This match set a record attendance for a United States home game.

=== Canada ===
15 June 2013
20:00 EDT (UTC-04)

Canada	14–40	Ireland
Try: Ardron 46' m Pen: Pritchard (3/3) 6', 17', 24'	Report	Try: Trimble 9' c McFadden (3) 27' m, 58' c, 80+1' c Cave 54' c O'Donnell 67' c Con: Madigan (3/4) 11', 55', 59'; Jackson (2/2) 68', 80+2'

BMO Field, Toronto
Attendance: 20,396
Referee: Leighton Hodges (Wales)

FB	15	Connor Braid	(substituted off) 61'
RW	14	James Pritchard
OC	13	Ciaran Hearn
IC	12	Harry Jones
LW	11	Taylor Paris
FH	10	Nathan Hirayama
SH	9	Phil Mack	(substituted off) 55'
N8	8	Aaron Carpenter (c)	(substituted off) 79'
OF	7	John Moonlight	(substituted off) 61'
BF	6	Tyler Ardron
RL	5	Tyler Hotson	(substituted off) 69'
LL	4	Jebb Sinclair
TP	3	Jason Marshall	(substituted off) 72'
HK	2	Ray Barkwill	(substituted off) 54'
LP	1	Hubert Buydens	(substituted off) 72'
Replacements:
HK	16	Ryan Hamilton	(substituted in) 54'
PR	17	Andrew Tiedemann	(substituted in) 72'
PR	18	Doug Wooldridge	(substituted in) 72'
LK	19	Jon Phelan	(substituted in) 69'
FL	20	Nanyak Dala	(substituted in) 61'
SH	21	Sean White	(substituted in) 55'
CE	22	Nick Blevins	(substituted in) 79'
CE	23	Pat Parfrey	(substituted in) 61'
Coach:
(New Zealand) Kieran Crowley

FB	15	Felix Jones
RW	14	Fergus McFadden
OC	13	Darren Cave	(substituted off) 72'
IC	12	James Downey
LW	11	Andrew Trimble
FH	10	Ian Madigan	(substituted off) 61'
SH	9	Isaac Boss	(substituted off) 57'
N8	8	Peter O'Mahony (c)
OF	7	Tommy O'Donnell
BF	6	Kevin McLaughlin	(substituted off) 71'
RL	5	Devin Toner
LL	4	Dan Tuohy	(substituted off) 71'
TP	3	Mike Ross	(substituted off) 61'
HK	2	Richardt Strauss	(substituted off) 65'
LP	1	Tom Court	(substituted off) 65'
Replacements:
HK	16	Seán Cronin	(substituted in) 65'
PR	17	Dave Kilcoyne	(substituted in) 65'
PR	18	Declan Fitzpatrick	(substituted in) 61'
LK	19	Mike McCarthy	(substituted in) 71'
FL	20	Chris Henry	(substituted in) 71'
SH	21	Paul Marshall	(substituted in) 57'
FH	22	Paddy Jackson	(substituted in) 61'
FB	23	Robbie Henshaw	(substituted in) 72'
Coach:
(Australia) Les Kiss

Man of the Match:
Fergus McFadden (Ireland)

Touch judges:
Nick Ricono (United States)
Ed Gardner (United States)

Notes:

- This match set a record attendance for a rugby match on Canadian soil.

== Touring squad ==
Caps and ages are to first test date, 8 June

Note: Flags indicate national union for the club/province as defined by World Rugby.

Player	Position	Date of birth (age)	Caps	Club/province
Rory Best	Hooker	15 August 1982 (aged 30)	67	(Ireland) Ulster
Seán Cronin	Hooker	6 May 1986 (aged 27)	26	(Ireland) Leinster
Mike Sherry	Hooker	18 June 1988 (aged 24)	0	(Ireland) Munster
Richardt Strauss	Hooker	29 January 1986 (aged 27)	2	(Ireland) Leinster
Tom Court	Prop	6 November 1980 (aged 32)	30	(Ireland) Ulster
Declan Fitzpatrick	Prop	12 June 1983 (aged 29)	4	(Ireland) Ulster
Jamie Hagan	Prop	5 April 1987 (aged 26)	0	(Ireland) Leinster
Dave Kilcoyne	Prop	14 December 1988 (aged 24)	6	(Ireland) Munster
Mike Ross	Prop	21 December 1979 (aged 33)	29	(Ireland) Leinster
Mike McCarthy	Lock	27 November 1981 (aged 31)	10	(Ireland) Connacht
Devin Toner	Lock	29 June 1986 (aged 26)	5	(Ireland) Leinster
Dan Tuohy	Lock	18 June 1985 (aged 27)	5	(Ireland) Ulster
Iain Henderson	Flanker	21 February 1992 (aged 21)	5	(Ireland) Ulster
Chris Henry	Flanker	17 October 1984 (aged 28)	6	(Ireland) Ulster
Kevin McLaughlin	Flanker	20 September 1984 (aged 28)	5	(Ireland) Leinster
Tommy O'Donnell	Flanker	21 June 1987 (aged 25)	0	(Ireland) Munster
Peter O'Mahony (c)	Flanker	17 September 1989 (aged 23)	14	(Ireland) Munster
Isaac Boss	Scrum-half	9 April 1980 (aged 33)	15	(Ireland) Leinster
Kieran Marmion	Scrum-half	11 February 1992 (aged 21)	0	(Ireland) Connacht
Paul Marshall	Scrum-half	26 June 1985 (aged 27)	1	(Ireland) Ulster
Paddy Jackson	Fly-half	5 January 1992 (aged 21)	3	(Ireland) Ulster
Ian Madigan	Fly-half	21 March 1989 (aged 24)	2	(Ireland) Leinster
Darren Cave	Centre	5 April 1987 (aged 26)	3	(Ireland) Ulster
Fergus McFadden	Centre	17 June 1986 (aged 26)	17	(Ireland) Leinster
Stuart Olding	Centre	11 March 1993 (aged 20)	0	(Ireland) Ulster
Andrew Trimble	Wing	20 October 1984 (aged 28)	49	(Ireland) Ulster
Simon Zebo	Wing	16 March 1990 (aged 23)	5	(Ireland) Munster
Robbie Henshaw	Fullback	12 June 1993 (aged 19)	0	(Ireland) Connacht
Felix Jones	Fullback	5 August 1987 (aged 25)	3	(Ireland) Munster

=== Notes ===
Pre tour and post 2013 Six Nations Championship, the then head coach Declan Kidney, was sacked from his role as head coach of Ireland. Leinster's head coach Joe Schmidt was named as Kidney's replacement, but will be unable to fill the role for Ireland's Summer Tour. Therefore, assistant head coach Les Kiss, was named as interim head coach for the Summer Tour to Canada and United States.

The initial squad was named on 19 May 2014, with Rory Best as captain. It was a significantly weaker squad due to a number of regular Irish players in the British & Irish Lions squad for their 2013 tour to Australia. The squad then lost their original captain, Rory Best, on 26 May, due to a call to the Lions squad. Peter O'Mahony was named as his replacement in terms of captaincy, and Seán Cronin filled the void left in the hookers. Ahead of the test against Canada, Ireland then lost Simon Zebo to the Lions. Zebo who has started in the test against the United States, was not replaced.
