= 2016 Ireland rugby union tour of South Africa =

- Coach: Joe Schmidt
- Tour captain: Rory Best
- Top test point scorer: Paddy Jackson (40)
- Top test try scorer: 5 players with 1 try
Summary
P	W	D	L
Total
3	1	0	2
Test match
3	1	0	2
Opponent
P	W	D	L
South Africa
3	1	0	2

Tour chronology
- ← Argentina 2014 Japan 2017 →

In June 2016, Ireland played a three test series against South Africa as part of the 2016 mid-year rugby union tests. It was the first time that Ireland had played a test series against South Africa in South Africa since 2004. They played the Springboks across the three weeks that the June International window is allocated to; 11 June–25 June. The series was part of the fourth year of the global rugby calendar established by the International Rugby Board, which ran through to 2019.

== Fixtures ==
Date	Venue	Home	Score	Away
11 June 2016	DHL Newlands, Cape Town	South Africa	20–26	Ireland
18 June 2016	Emirates Airline Park, Johannesburg	South Africa	32–26	Ireland
25 June 2016	Nelson Mandela Bay Stadium, Port Elizabeth	South Africa	19–13	Ireland

== Squads ==
Note: Ages, caps and clubs are as per 11 June, the first test match of the tour.

=== Ireland ===
On 25 May 2016, Joe Schmidt announced his 32-man squad for Ireland's June test series against South Africa.

On 2 June, Luke Fitzgerald, Dave Kearney, Rob Kearney and Johnny Sexton were all ruled out of the tour after sustaining injuries in and after the Pro12 Grand Final. Craig Gilroy, Matt Healy, Ian Madigan and Tiernan O'Halloran were called up as their replacements.

Coaching team:

- Head coach: (New Zealand) Joe Schmidt
- Defence coach: (England) Andy Farrell
- Forwards coach: (Ireland) Simon Easterby

Player	Position	Date of birth (age)	Caps	Club/province
Rory Best (c)	Hooker	15 August 1982 (aged 33)	94	Ulster
Seán Cronin	Hooker	6 May 1986 (aged 30)	50	Leinster
Richardt Strauss	Hooker	29 January 1986 (aged 30)	16	Leinster
Finlay Bealham	Prop	9 October 1991 (aged 24)	1	Connacht
Tadhg Furlong	Prop	14 November 1992 (aged 23)	5	Leinster
Dave Kilcoyne	Prop	14 December 1988 (aged 27)	15	Munster
Jack McGrath	Prop	11 October 1989 (aged 26)	30	Leinster
Mike Ross	Prop	21 December 1979 (aged 36)	59	Leinster
Ultan Dillane	Lock	9 November 1993 (aged 22)	3	Connacht
Iain Henderson	Lock	21 February 1992 (aged 24)	23	Ulster
Quinn Roux	Lock	30 October 1990 (aged 25)	0	Connacht
Donnacha Ryan	Lock	11 December 1983 (aged 32)	39	Munster
Devin Toner	Lock	29 June 1986 (aged 29)	36	Leinster
Jordi Murphy	Flanker	22 April 1991 (aged 25)	14	Leinster
Sean Reidy	Flanker	10 May 1989 (aged 27)	0	Ulster
Rhys Ruddock	Flanker	13 November 1990 (aged 25)	10	Leinster
CJ Stander	Flanker	5 April 1990 (aged 26)	5	Munster
Jamie Heaslip	Number 8	15 December 1983 (aged 32)	85	Leinster
Kieran Marmion	Scrum-half	11 February 1992 (aged 24)	5	Connacht
Conor Murray	Scrum-half	20 April 1989 (aged 27)	47	Munster
Eoin Reddan	Scrum-half	20 November 1980 (aged 35)	70	Leinster
Paddy Jackson	Fly-half	5 January 1992 (aged 24)	13	Ulster
Ian Madigan	Fly-half	21 March 1989 (aged 27)	29	Leinster
Johnny Sexton	Fly-half	11 July 1985 (aged 30)	61	Leinster
Robbie Henshaw	Centre	12 June 1993 (aged 22)	20	Connacht
Luke Marshall	Centre	3 March 1991 (aged 25)	6	Ulster
Stuart Olding	Centre	11 March 1993 (aged 23)	2	Ulster
Jared Payne	Centre	13 October 1985 (aged 30)	14	Ulster
Keith Earls	Wing	2 October 1987 (aged 28)	50	Munster
Luke Fitzgerald	Wing	13 September 1987 (aged 28)	34	Leinster
Craig Gilroy	Wing	11 March 1991 (aged 25)	6	Ulster
Matt Healy	Wing	14 March 1989 (aged 27)	0	Connacht
Dave Kearney	Wing	19 June 1989 (aged 26)	16	Leinster
Andrew Trimble	Wing	20 October 1984 (aged 31)	63	Ulster
Rob Kearney	Fullback	26 March 1986 (aged 30)	69	Leinster
Tiernan O'Halloran	Fullback	26 February 1991 (aged 25)	0	Connacht

=== South Africa ===
On 28 May 2016, Allister Coetzee named his first squad since being appointed head coach. He included the following players in a 31-man squad for a three-test match series against the touring Ireland:

Pieter-Steph du Toit was initially named in the squad, but withdrew through injury and was replaced by Franco Mostert on 31 May 2016. However, on 6 June, Du Toit was given the all-clear by the medical staff and returned to training with the squad. Centre Jan Serfontein was ruled out for the entire series, but no replacement was named.

Pat Lambie was ruled out of the second test match after suffering a concussion in the first test and being given a mandatory rest period in line with World Rugby's Return to Play protocol. On 13 June 2016, Morné Steyn was called up to the squad as injury cover for Lambie.

Coaching team:

- Head coach: (South Africa) Allister Coetzee
- Backs coach: (South Africa) Mzwandile Stick
- Forwards coach: (South Africa) Johann van Graan
- Assistant coach: (South Africa) Matt Proudfoot

Player	Position	Date of birth (age)	Caps	Club/province
Bongi Mbonambi	Hooker	7 January 1991 (aged 25)	0	(South Africa) Stormers
Scarra Ntubeni	Hooker	18 February 1991 (aged 25)	0	(South Africa) Stormers
Adriaan Strauss	Hooker	18 November 1985 (aged 30)	54	(South Africa) Bulls
Steven Kitshoff	Prop	10 February 1992 (aged 24)	0	(France) Bordeaux
Frans Malherbe	Prop	14 March 1991 (aged 25)	12	(South Africa) Stormers
Tendai Mtawarira	Prop	1 August 1985 (aged 30)	75	(South Africa) Sharks
Trevor Nyakane	Prop	4 May 1989 (aged 27)	23	(South Africa) Bulls
Julian Redelinghuys	Prop	11 September 1989 (aged 26)	2	(South Africa) Lions
Lood de Jager	Lock	17 December 1992 (aged 23)	19	(South Africa) Cheetahs
Pieter-Steph du Toit	Lock	20 August 1992 (aged 23)	8	(South Africa) Stormers
Eben Etzebeth	Lock	29 October 1991 (aged 24)	44	(South Africa) Stormers
Franco Mostert	Lock	27 November 1990 (aged 25)	0	(South Africa) Lions
Siya Kolisi	Flanker	16 June 1991 (aged 24)	13	(South Africa) Stormers
Jaco Kriel	Flanker	21 August 1989 (aged 26)	0	(South Africa) Lions
Francois Louw	Flanker	15 June 1985 (aged 30)	43	(England) Bath
Sikhumbuzo Notshe	Flanker	28 May 1993 (aged 23)	0	(South Africa) Stormers
Duane Vermeulen	Number 8	3 July 1986 (aged 29)	35	(France) Toulon
Warren Whiteley	Number 8	18 September 1987 (aged 28)	3	(South Africa) Lions
Faf de Klerk	Scrum-half	19 October 1991 (aged 24)	0	(South Africa) Lions
Nic Groom	Scrum-half	21 February 1990 (aged 26)	0	(South Africa) Stormers
Rudy Paige	Scrum-half	2 August 1989 (aged 26)	2	(South Africa) Bulls
Garth April	Fly-half	16 July 1991 (aged 24)	0	(South Africa) Sharks
Elton Jantjies	Fly-half	1 August 1990 (aged 25)	2	(South Africa) Lions
Pat Lambie	Fly-half	17 October 1990 (aged 25)	50	(South Africa) Sharks
Morné Steyn	Fly-half	11 July 1984 (aged 31)	60	(France) Stade Français
Damian de Allende	Centre	25 November 1991 (aged 24)	13	(South Africa) Stormers
Jesse Kriel	Centre	15 February 1994 (aged 22)	11	(South Africa) Bulls
Lionel Mapoe	Centre	13 July 1988 (aged 27)	1	(South Africa) Lions
Jan Serfontein	Centre	15 April 1993 (aged 23)	26	(South Africa) Bulls
Ruan Combrinck	Wing	10 May 1990 (aged 26)	0	(South Africa) Lions
Lwazi Mvovo	Wing	3 June 1986 (aged 30)	15	(South Africa) Sharks
JP Pietersen	Wing	12 July 1986 (aged 29)	66	(South Africa) Sharks
Willie le Roux	Fullback	18 August 1989 (aged 26)	34	(South Africa) Sharks

== Matches ==
=== First Test ===
11 June 2016
17:00 SAST (UTC+02)

South Africa	20–26	Ireland
Try: Mvovo 31' c Du Toit 68' c Con: Jantjies (2/2) 31', 68'; Pen: Lambie (1/2) 15'; Jantjies (1/1) 25'	Report	Try: Payne 10' c Murray 42' c Con: Jackson (2/2) 11', 42'; Pen: Jackson (3/4) 18', 67', 76'; Drop: Jackson (1/2) 36'

DHL Newlands, Cape Town
Attendance: 42,640
Referee: Mathieu Raynal (France)

FB	15	Willie le Roux
RW	14	JP Pietersen
OC	13	Lionel Mapoe		(substituted off) 68'
IC	12	Damian de Allende
LW	11	Lwazi Mvovo
FH	10	Pat Lambie		(substituted off) 22'
SH	9	Faf de Klerk		(substituted off) 68'
N8	8	Duane Vermeulen
OF	7	Siya Kolisi
BF	6	Francois Louw		(substituted off) 55'
RL	5	Lood de Jager	(yellow card) 10' to 20'	(substituted off) 55'
LL	4	Eben Etzebeth
TP	3	Frans Malherbe		(substituted off) 76'
HK	2	Adriaan Strauss (c)
LP	1	Tendai Mtawarira		(substituted off) 58'
Replacements:
PR	16	Bongi Mbonambi
PR	17	Trevor Nyakane		(substituted on) 58'
HK	18	Julian Redelinghuys		(substituted on) 76'
LK	19	Pieter-Steph du Toit		(substituted on) 55'
N8	20	Warren Whiteley		(substituted on) 55'
SH	21	Rudy Paige		(substituted on) 68'
FH	22	Elton Jantjies		(substituted on) 22'
CE	23	Jesse Kriel		(substituted on) 68'
Coach:
(South Africa) Allister Coetzee

FB	15	Jared Payne
RW	14	Andrew Trimble
OC	13	Robbie Henshaw	(yellow card) 31' to 41'
IC	12	Luke Marshall
LW	11	Keith Earls		(substituted off) 76'
FH	10	Paddy Jackson
SH	9	Conor Murray
N8	8	Jamie Heaslip
OF	7	Jordi Murphy		(substituted off) 73'
BF	6	CJ Stander	(red card) 22'
RL	5	Devin Toner
LL	4	Iain Henderson		(substituted off) 68'
TP	3	Mike Ross		(substituted off) 58'
HK	2	Rory Best (c)		(substituted off) 68'
LP	1	Jack McGrath
Replacements:
HK	16	Seán Cronin		(substituted on) 68'
PR	17	Finlay Bealham
PR	18	Tadhg Furlong		(substituted on) 58'
LK	19	Ultan Dillane		(substituted on) 68'
FL	20	Rhys Ruddock		(substituted on) 73'
SH	21	Kieran Marmion
FH	22	Ian Madigan
WG	23	Craig Gilroy		(substituted on) 76'
Coach:
(New Zealand) Joe Schmidt

Man of the Match:
Devin Toner (Ireland)

Touch judges:
Angus Gardner (Australia)
Matthew Carley (England)
Television match official:
Jim Yuille (Scotland)

Notes:

- Faf de Klerk (South Africa) made his international debut.
- This was Ireland's first ever victory over South Africa in South Africa.

=== Second Test ===
18 June 2016
17:00 SAST (UTC+02)

South Africa	32–26	Ireland
Try: Combrinck 55' c Whiteley 63' m Du Toit 69' c De Allende 75' c Con: Jantjies (3/4) 57', 70', 76'; Pen: Jantjies (2/4) 3', 80'	Report	Try: Toner 33' c Heaslip 59' c Con: Jackson (2/2) 34', 60'; Pen: Jackson (4/4) 10', 14', 22', 27'

Emirates Airline Park, Johannesburg
Attendance: 58,400
Referee: Angus Gardner (Australia)

FB	15	Willie le Roux
RW	14	JP Pietersen
OC	13	Lionel Mapoe
IC	12	Damian de Allende
LW	11	Lwazi Mvovo	(substituted off) 40'
FH	10	Elton Jantjies	(substituted off) 59'	(substituted on) 62'
SH	9	Faf de Klerk
N8	8	Duane Vermeulen	(substituted off) 40'
OF	7	Siya Kolisi	(substituted off) 67'
BF	6	Francois Louw
RL	5	Pieter-Steph du Toit
LL	4	Eben Etzebeth
TP	3	Frans Malherbe	(substituted off) 46'
HK	2	Adriaan Strauss (c)
LP	1	Tendai Mtawarira	(substituted off) 51'
Replacements:
HK	16	Bongi Mbonambi
PR	17	Trevor Nyakane	(substituted on) 51'
PR	18	Julian Redelinghuys	(substituted on) 46'
LK	19	Franco Mostert	(substituted on) 67'
N8	20	Warren Whiteley	(substituted on) 40'
SH	21	Rudy Paige
FH	22	Morné Steyn	(substituted on) 59'	(substituted off) 62'
WG	23	Ruan Combrinck	(substituted on) 40'
Coach:
(South Africa) Allister Coetzee

FB	15	Jared Payne	(substituted off) 76'
RW	14	Andrew Trimble
OC	13	Robbie Henshaw	(substituted off) 76'
IC	12	Stuart Olding
LW	11	Craig Gilroy
FH	10	Paddy Jackson
SH	9	Conor Murray	(substituted off) 77'
N8	8	Jamie Heaslip
OF	7	Rhys Ruddock	42' to 49'
BF	6	Iain Henderson			(substituted off) 70'
RL	5	Quinn Roux	(substituted off) 50'
LL	4	Devin Toner
TP	3	Tadhg Furlong	(substituted off) 59'
HK	2	Rory Best (c)	(substituted off) 65'
LP	1	Jack McGrath	(substituted off) 65'
Replacements:
HK	16	Richardt Strauss	(substituted on) 65'
PR	17	Dave Kilcoyne	(substituted on) 65'
PR	18	Finlay Bealham	(substituted on) 59'
LK	19	Donnacha Ryan	(substituted on) 50'
FL	20	Sean Reidy	(substituted on) 42'	(substituted off) 49'	(substituted on) 70'
SH	21	Kieran Marmion	(substituted on) 77'
FH	22	Ian Madigan	(substituted on) 76'
FB	23	Tiernan O'Halloran	(substituted on) 76'
Coach:
(New Zealand) Joe Schmidt

Man of the Match:
Ruan Combrinck (South Africa)

Touch judges:
Glen Jackson (New Zealand)
Ben Whitehouse (Wales)
Television match official:
Jim Yuille (Scotland)

Notes:

- Ruan Combrinck and Franco Mostert (both South Africa) and Sean Reidy and Quinn Roux (Ireland) made their international debuts.

=== Third Test ===
25 June 2016
17:00 SAST (UTC+02)

South Africa	19–13	Ireland
Try: Pietersen 39' c Con: Jantjies (1/1) 40'; Pen: Jantjies (3/4) 5', 31', 68'; Combrinck (1/1) 59'	Report	Try: Marshall 15' c Con: Jackson (1/1) 16'; Pen: Jackson (2/3) 22', 69'

Nelson Mandela Bay Stadium, Port Elizabeth
Attendance: 42,324
Referee: Glen Jackson (New Zealand)

FB	15	Willie le Roux	(yellow card) 10' to 20'
RW	14	Ruan Combrinck
OC	13	Lionel Mapoe
IC	12	Damian de Allende
LW	11	JP Pietersen
FH	10	Elton Jantjies
SH	9	Faf de Klerk
N8	8	Warren Whiteley
OF	7	Siya Kolisi		(substituted off) 60'
BF	6	Francois Louw
RL	5	Pieter-Steph du Toit
LL	4	Eben Etzebeth		(substituted off) 73'
TP	3	Frans Malherbe		(substituted off) 56'
HK	2	Adriaan Strauss (c)		(substituted off) 78'
LP	1	Tendai Mtawarira		(substituted off) 56'
Replacements:
HK	16	Bongi Mbonambi		(substituted on) 78'
PR	17	Steven Kitshoff		(substituted on) 56'
PR	18	Julian Redelinghuys		(substituted on) 56'
LK	19	Franco Mostert		(substituted on) 73'
FL	20	Jaco Kriel		(substituted on) 60'
SH	21	Rudy Paige
FH	22	Morné Steyn
WG	23	Lwazi Mvovo
Coach:
(South Africa) Allister Coetzee

FB	15	Tiernan O'Halloran	(substituted off) 10'	(substituted on) 18'	(substituted off) 40'
RW	14	Andrew Trimble
OC	13	Luke Marshall
IC	12	Stuart Olding
LW	11	Keith Earls	(substituted off) 72'
FH	10	Paddy Jackson
SH	9	Conor Murray	(substituted off) 68'
N8	8	Jamie Heaslip
OF	7	Jordi Murphy
BF	6	CJ Stander	(substituted off) 68'
RL	5	Devin Toner
LL	4	Iain Henderson	(substituted off) 68'
TP	3	Mike Ross	(substituted off) 50'
HK	2	Rory Best (c)	(substituted off) 72'
LP	1	Jack McGrath
Replacements:
HK	16	Seán Cronin	(substituted on) 72'
PR	17	Finlay Bealham
PR	18	Tadhg Furlong	(substituted on) 50'
LK	19	Ultan Dillane	(substituted on) 68'
FL	20	Rhys Ruddock	(substituted on) 68'
SH	21	Eoin Reddan	(substituted on) 68'
FH	22	Ian Madigan	(substituted on) 72'
WG	23	Matt Healy	(substituted on) 10'	(substituted off) 18'	(substituted on) 40'
Coach:
(New Zealand) Joe Schmidt

Man of the Match:
JP Pietersen (South Africa)

Touch judges:
Angus Gardner (Australia)
Ben Whitehouse (Wales)
Television match official:
Rowan Kitt (England)

Notes:

- Steven Kitshoff, Jaco Kriel and Bongi Mbonambi (all South Africa) and Matt Healy (Ireland) made their international debuts.
- Conor Murray (Ireland) earned his 50th test cap.
- This was Eoin Reddan's last international after announcing his retirement from the professional game.

== Statistics ==
Key

- Con: Conversions
- Pen: Penalties
- DG: Drop goals
- Pts: Points

=== Ireland Statistics ===
Name	Played	Tries	Con	Pen	DG	Pts	Temporarily suspended	Sent off (straight red)
Paddy Jackson	3	0	5	9	1	40	–	–
Jamie Heaslip	3	1	0	0	0	5	–	–
Conor Murray	3	1	0	0	0	5	–	–
Devin Toner	3	1	0	0	0	5	–	–
Luke Marshall	2	1	0	0	0	5	–	–
Jared Payne	2	1	0	0	0	5	–	–
Rory Best	3	0	0	0	0	0	–	–
Tadhg Furlong	3	0	0	0	0	0	–	–
Iain Henderson	3	0	0	0	0	0	–	–
Jack McGrath	3	0	0	0	0	0	–	–
Rhys Ruddock	3	0	0	0	0	0	–	–
Andrew Trimble	3	0	0	0	0	0	–	–
Seán Cronin	2	0	0	0	0	0	–	–
Ultan Dillane	2	0	0	0	0	0	–	–
Keith Earls	2	0	0	0	0	0	–	–
Craig Gilroy	2	0	0	0	0	0	–	–
Robbie Henshaw	2	0	0	0	0	0	1	–
Ian Madigan	2	0	0	0	0	0	–	–
Jordi Murphy	2	0	0	0	0	0	–	–
Tiernan O'Halloran	2	0	0	0	0	0	–	–
Stuart Olding	2	0	0	0	0	0	–	–
Mike Ross	2	0	0	0	0	0	–	–
CJ Stander	2	0	0	0	0	0	–	1
Finlay Bealham	1	0	0	0	0	0	–	–
Matt Healy	1	0	0	0	0	0	–	–
Dave Kilcoyne	1	0	0	0	0	0	–	–
Kieran Marmion	1	0	0	0	0	0	–	–
Eoin Reddan	1	0	0	0	0	0	–	–
Sean Reidy	1	0	0	0	0	0	–	–
Quinn Roux	1	0	0	0	0	0	–	–
Donnacha Ryan	1	0	0	0	0	0	–	–
Richardt Strauss	1	0	0	0	0	0	–	–
Luke Fitzgerald	–	–	–	–	–	0	–	–
Dave Kearney	–	–	–	–	–	0	–	–
Rob Kearney	–	–	–	–	–	0	–	–
Johnny Sexton	–	–	–	–	–	0	–	–

=== Test series statistics ===
Name	Team	Tries	Con	Pen	DG	Pts
Paddy Jackson	Ireland	0	5	9	1	40
Elton Jantjies	South Africa	0	6	6	0	30
Pieter-Steph du Toit	South Africa	2	0	0	0	10
Ruan Combrinck	South Africa	1	0	1	0	8
Damian de Allende	South Africa	1	0	0	0	5
Jamie Heaslip	Ireland	1	0	0	0	5
Luke Marshall	Ireland	1	0	0	0	5
Conor Murray	Ireland	1	0	0	0	5
Lwazi Mvovo	South Africa	1	0	0	0	5
Jared Payne	Ireland	1	0	0	0	5
JP Pietersen	South Africa	1	0	0	0	5
Devin Toner	Ireland	1	0	0	0	5
Warren Whiteley	South Africa	1	0	0	0	5
Pat Lambie	South Africa	0	0	1	0	3

== See also ==
- 2016 mid-year rugby union internationals
- History of rugby union matches between Ireland and South Africa
