= Rodney Ah You =

New Zealand-born Irish rugby union player

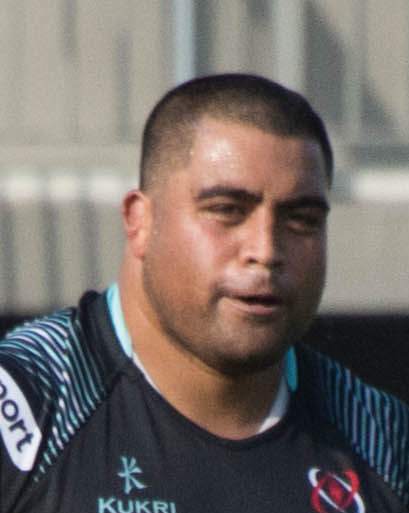
- Ah You in 2017
- Born: Rodney Leiua Ah You; 27 October 1988 (age 38) Wellington, New Zealand
- Height: 1.85 m (6 ft 1 in)
- Weight: 128 kg (20 st 2 lb)
- School: Christchurch Boys' High School

Rugby union career
- Position: Prop
Senior career
Years	Team	Apps	(Points)
2010–2016	Connacht	121	(25)
2016–2018	Ulster	35	(0)
2018–2021	Newcastle Falcons	25	(15)
2021-2022	Rugby Club Vannes	10	(0)
2022-2023	USA Limoges	18	(5)
2023-2024	US Cognac	18	(5)
- Correct as of 16 June 2025
Provincial / State sides
Years	Team	Apps	(Points)
2009–2010	Canterbury	0	(0)
International career
Years	Team	Apps	(Points)
2007	New Zealand U19	5	(0)
2008	New Zealand U20	3	(0)
2014	Ireland	3	(0)
- Correct as of 16 June 2025

Rodney Ah You (born 27 October 1988) is a New Zealand-born Irish international rugby union player. His primary position is prop, and he can play at both tighthead and loosehead. Born in Wellington, he played for Canterbury, before moving to Ireland where he played six seasons for Connacht and two for Ulster, then England where he played three seasons for Newcastle Falcons, then France, where he played a season with Vannes in the Pro D2, and two seasons in Nationale 2 with Limoges and Cognac.

He represented Ireland after qualifying through residency in October 2013. He won three caps, making his international debut on 7 June 2014 against Argentina.

== Club career ==
=== Early career ===
At a young age Ah You's primary sporting interest was boxing, only taking up rugby at the age of 16. He started out playing as a back row forward, but credits former Crusaders player Dave Hewett with his move to the front row. Ah You progressed quickly in the sport, being capped by the Canterbury senior team before he had turned 20, and playing at under-age level for New Zealand. Ah You did not make the step up to Super Rugby level, however, and had not been called up for the Crusaders team by the time he left Canterbury for Connacht.

=== Connacht ===
Ah You joined Connacht on an 18-month deal in October 2010. He was brought in to replace the injured former England international, Robbie Morris in the squad. Ah You made his debut for Connacht in the 2010–11 European Challenge Cup against Harlequins on 12 December 2010, coming on as a replacement. He made his league debut for the side on 1 January 2011 against Leinster. In total, Ah You played 11 2010–11 Celtic League games and three games in the Challenge Cup in his first season, with all of his appearances coming as a replacement.

Ah You's second season with Connacht saw him play more regularly, and he made his first league start for Connacht in the opening game of 2011–12 Pro12, the Celtic League having been renamed. In that game against Benetton Treviso, Ah You scored his first try for the province and it proved decisive as Connacht won by just two points. Over the course of the season he featured in 13 games, seven of them being starts. The season also saw Ah You play in four of Connacht's six games in their first ever Heineken Cup campaign, starting against Harlequins and Toulouse, and coming from the bench in both games against Gloucester.

The 2012–13 season once again saw Ah You make all of his appearances from the bench. He played in 13 Pro12 matches, and played in Connacht's away game to Zebre in the 2012–13 Heineken Cup. In February 2013, Ah You signed an extension to his contract to keep him with Connacht until the end of the 2013–14 season.

In the 2013–14 season, Ah You played more regularly. He made his first Connacht start of the season on 4 October against Treviso in the 2013–14 Pro12, having come on as a replacement in four games before that. Ah You played in all six of Connacht's games in the 2013–14 Heineken Cup, starting at home to Saracens and Toulouse, and away to Zebre. In the league he featured in all 22 of Connacht's games, starting in 12 of them. Ah You agreed to another contract extension with Connacht in December 2013, which will keep him with the province until 2016.

=== Ulster ===
In January 2016, it was announced that Ah You would join fellow Irish province Ulster on a two-year deal from the start of the 2016–17 season.

=== Newcastle Falcons ===
Rodney joined Newcastle Falcons in mid-November 2018 but suffered from an injury during training. He made his Premiership debut against Saracens on 5 April 2019 after returning to full fitness and remained a key asset in Falcons' 2018-19 campaign.

=== France ===
In Summer 2021 Rodney departed Newcastle Falcons signing for Rugby Club Vannes in the French Rugby Pro D2. The following season he joined Limoges in Nationale 2, moving to US Cognac in the same division in 2023.

== International career ==
In his early career, Ah You was an under-age international player for his country. He was capped for both the New Zealand Under-19 and Under-20 teams. In January 2014, Ah You was one of seven uncapped players named in Ireland's extended 44-man squad for the upcoming Six Nations by head coach Joe Schmidt. He had become eligible to play for Ireland in October 2013, qualifying through residency.

In May 2014, Ah You was called up to the initial Emerging Ireland squad for the IRB Nations Cup, but in June, following injury to Martin Moore, Ah You was called up to the full Ireland squad for the end of season tour to face Argentina. Ah You was named on the substitutes bench for the first test of the series in Resistencia and came on as a second-half replacement for Mike Ross as Ireland came out 29–17 winners.
