= Matt Healy (rugby union) =

Irish rugby union player (born 1989)

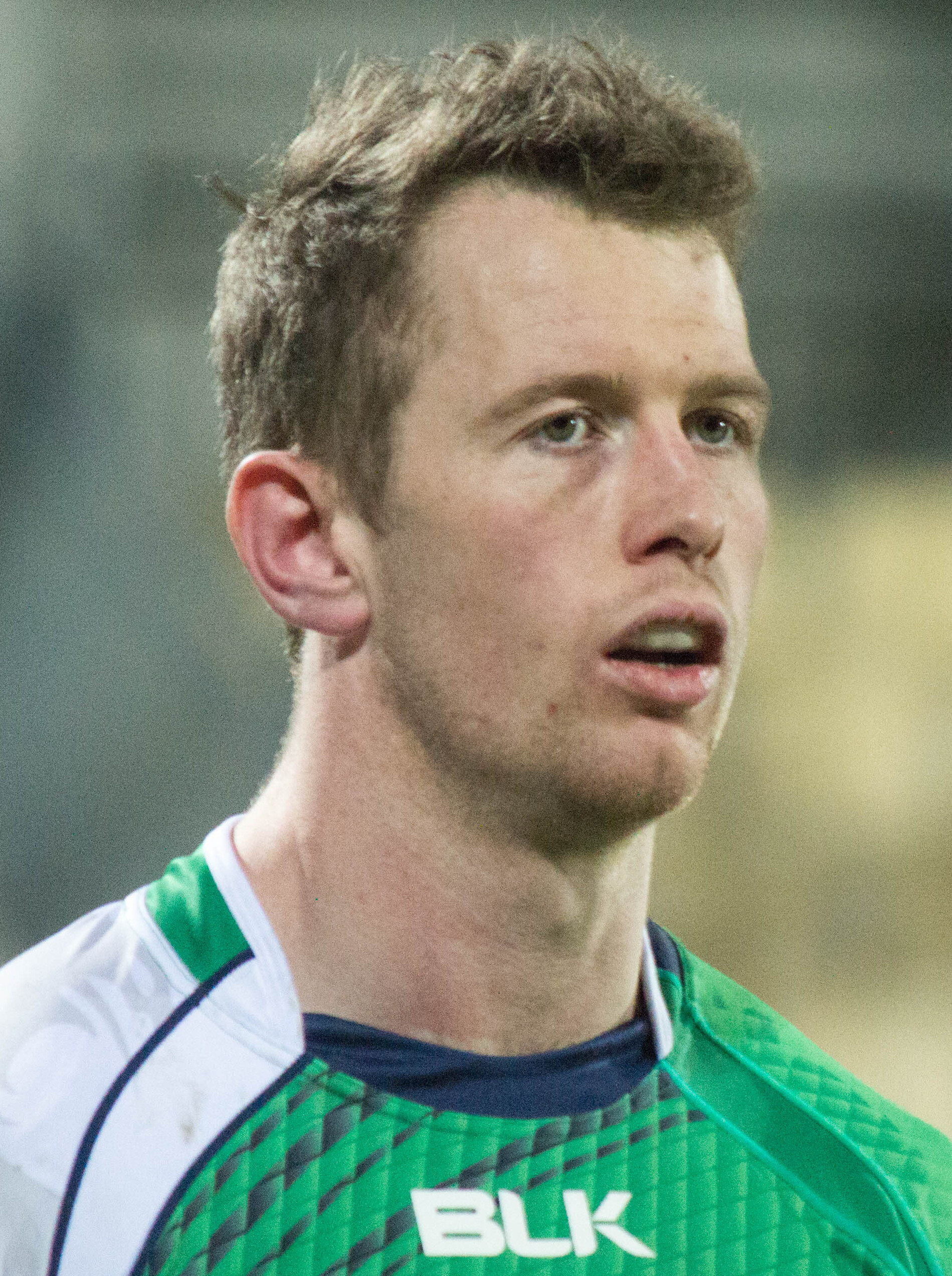
- Healy in 2016
- Born: Matthew Healy; 14 March 1989 (age 37) Dublin, Ireland
- Height: 1.83 m (6 ft 0 in)
- Weight: 92 kg (14.5 st)
- School: Gonzaga College

Rugby union career
- Position(s): Wing, Scrum-half, Fullback
- Current team: Connacht
Amateur team(s)
Years	Team	Apps	(Points)
- Lansdowne
Senior career
Years	Team	Apps	(Points)
2012–2022	Connacht	151	(290)
- Correct as of 3 March 2023
International career
Years	Team	Apps	(Points)
2009	Ireland U20	9	(0)
2016	Ireland	1	(0)
- Correct as of 25 June 2016

Matthew Healy (born 14 March 1989) is an Irish former professional rugby union player. His primary position was on the wing and he was also used as injury cover at fullback, while earlier in his career he played at scrum-half. Healy played his entire career for Irish provincial team Connacht Rugby in the Pro14 and represented Ireland at test level once. He is Connacht's all-time leading try scorer.

== Early life ==
Originally from Dublin, Healy is a former student of Gonzaga College in Ranelagh. He played for the school's rugby team in the 2007 Leinster Senior Cup, starting at scrum-half as the team were knocked out by reigning champions Blackrock. Also on the Gonzaga starting team for the game was future Ireland international Dominic Ryan.

== Career ==
=== Club ===
Healy joined Connacht in 2012 from the amateur club Lansdowne in the All-Ireland League. In his first season, Healy primarily played for the Connacht Eagles, the province's second tier or 'A' team, in the British and Irish Cup. At the end of the season Healy was named Connacht's A player of the year. Along with his appearances for the Eagles, he also played in 3 games for the senior side in the 2012–13 Pro12.

In his second season with the province, Healy featured more regularly for Connacht's first team. He scored his first try for the team against Zebre on 7 September 2013 in the first game of that year's Pro12. He made his European debut in a Heineken Cup match on 19 October that year, also against Zebre away in the Stadio XXV Aprile. Later that month, Healy signed a new contract with the province to keep him there at least until summer 2016. Healy's first try in the Heineken Cup came in the reverse fixture in the Sportsground on 11 January 2014, when he gave a man of the match display.

Healy continued to be a regular for the province. In 2015–16, he finished as the joint top try-scorer in the Pro12 and was named in the league's Dream Team. On 28 May 2016, Healy started for Connacht against Leinster in the 2016 Pro12 Grand Final. He scored a try in a 20–10 victory for the side, which earned Connacht their first ever title.

Healy made his 100th appearance for Connacht on 6 January 2018, in an interprovincial derby against Munster. Later in the season, he scored two tries for Connacht in a 26–25 defeat to the Cheetahs, taking him past Fionn Carr as the province's all-time top try-scorer.

=== International ===
Healy has represented Ireland internationally, having played for the Irish Under-20 team. He made a total of 9 appearances for the side, and went to the 2009 IRB Junior World Championship having also played in the 2009 Six Nations Under 20s Championship. In 2015, Healy was named in the Emerging Ireland squad for the 2015 Tbilisi Cup.

Healy received his first call up to the senior Ireland squad on 2 June 2016 for the tour to South Africa. He made his debut in the third test, coming on as a replacement for his Connacht teammate Tiernan O'Halloran.
