= Dave Kilcoyne =

Irish rugby union player (born 1988)

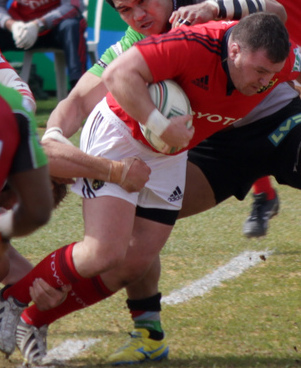
- Kilcoyne representing Munster during the Heineken Cup
- Born: 14 December 1988 (age 37) Limerick, Ireland
- Height: 1.83 m (6 ft 0 in)
- Weight: 111 kg (17.5 st; 245 lb)
- School: Ardscoil Rís
- Notable relative: Marcus Horan (cousin)

Rugby union career
- Position: Prop
Amateur team(s)
Years	Team	Apps	(Points)
- UL Bohemians
Senior career
Years	Team	Apps	(Points)
2011–2024	Munster	220	(110)
- Correct as of 20 December 2024
International career
Years	Team	Apps	(Points)
2012–2023	Ireland	56	(10)
2013–2022	Ireland A	3	(0)
- Correct as of 14 October 2023

David Kilcoyne (born 14 December 1988) is an Irish former rugby union player who last played as a prop for United Rugby Championship club Munster and the Ireland national team.

== Early life ==
Born in Limerick, Kilcoyne played his schools rugby with Ardscoil Rís, where he won the Munster Schools Junior Cup. The former Munster and Ireland prop Marcus Horan is a cousin of Kilcoyne's.

== Munster ==
Kilcoyne joined the Munster Academy at the start of the 2010–11 season, after impressing in the 2009–10 British and Irish Cup campaign. On 26 December 2011, he made his Munster debut as a replacement against Connacht in a Pro12 match. He made his first start for Munster in the round 21 league fixture against Scarlets on 21 April 2012. On 6 April 2012, Kilcoyne scored a try in extra-time of the Munster A v Leinster A British and Irish Cup semi-final, securing a place in the final for Munster A. He also started in the 2011–12 British and Irish Cup Final on 27 April 2012, which Munster A won after beating Cross Keys 31–12 in Musgrave Park, Cork.

Kilcoyne made his Heineken Cup debut on 13 October 2012, in Munster's opening 2012–13 Heineken Cup fixture away to Racing 92. He played in all of Munster's remaining pool matches, except the away match to Saracens due to illness. Kilcoyne scored his first try for Munster on 29 March 2013, in a league fixture against Glasgow Warriors. He started for Munster in their 18–12 quarter-final victory away to Harlequins on 7 April 2013. Kilcoyne also started the 16–10 semi-final defeat to Clermont Auvergne on 27 April 2013. He was nominated for Munster Player of the Year for the 2012–13 season, but lost to Tommy O'Donnell.

Kilcoyne started against Edinburgh in round 1 of the 2013–14 Heineken Cup. He also started against Gloucester in round 2 on 19 October 2013. Kilcoyne also started against Perpignan on 8 December 2013. He was a replacement against Perpignan on 14 December 2013. Kilcoyne started the 20–7 away win against Gloucester on 11 January 2013, a win that secured quarter-final qualification for Munster. He started against Edinburgh in the round 6 38–6 win on 19 January 2014 that secured a home quarter-final. Kilcoyne started in Munster's Heineken Cup quarter-final against Toulouse on 5 April 2014, scoring a try in the 47–23 win. He started in Munster's 24–16 semi-final defeat to Toulon on 27 April 2014. Kilcoyne was named in the 2013-14 Pro12 Team of the Season on 5 May 2014.

Kilcoyne scored a try for Munster in their 31–5 win against Zebre on 19 September 2014. He started against Sale Sharks in Munster's first European Rugby Champions Cup game on 18 October 2014, scoring a try. He came off the bench against Saracens in round 2 of the Champions Cup on 24 October 2014, scoring a try in the 14–3 win. Kilcoyne started against Clermont Auvergne on 6 December 2014, but went off injured early in the first-half.

Kilcoyne started Munster's opening pool game of the 2015–16 European Rugby Champions Cup against Benetton on 14 November 2015. On 19 February 2016, Kilcoyne scored two tries in Munster's 27–24 defeat against Glasgow Warriors in the 2015–16 Pro12. On 7 May 2016, Kilcoyne earned his 100th cap for Munster in their 31–15 win against Scarlets. On 4 November 2016, Kilcoyne scored two tries and won the Man-of-the-Match award in Munster's 33–0 win against Ospreys. On 24 January 2017, it was announced that Kilcoyne had signed a contract extension with Munster. On 5 May 2017, Kilcoyne was named in the 2016–17 Pro12 Dream Team. On 9 September 2017, Kilcoyne made his 100th appearance in the United Rugby Championship when he came off the bench against South African side Cheetahs in round 2 of the 2017–18 Pro14. Kilcoyne was Man-of-the-Match in Munster's 14–7 win against Racing 92 in round 2 of the 2017–18 European Rugby Champions Cup on 21 October 2017.

Kilcoyne earned his 150th cap for Munster on 7 April 2018, coming off the bench and scoring a try in the province's 39–22 away win against Southern Kings. He signed a three-year contract extension with Munster in March 2020. Kilcoyne earned his 200th cap for Munster in their 34–20 home win against Edinburgh in round 12 of the 2021–22 United Rugby Championship on 18 February 2022. A neck injury sustained during Ireland's final 2022 Six Nations fixture in March eventually required surgery in April, ruling Kilcoyne out for up to 12 weeks. He signed a one-year contract extension with Munster in February 2023.

Kilcoyne signed a further one-year extension in May 2024 but suffered an ankle injury in 2024/5 preseason. Hampered by further injuries, he played just five games in all subsequent to the 2023 Rugby World Cup, and in May 2025, Kilcoyne announced his retirement from rugby. His last match had been against Ulster in December 2024.

== Ireland ==
On 24 October 2012, Kilcoyne was included in the senior Ireland squad for the 2012 Autumn Tests. Kilcoyne made his Ireland debut on 10 November 2012, as a temporary replacement for Cian Healy in the test against South Africa. He started for Ireland in their non-capped friendly against Fiji on 17 November 2012. He won a second cap against Argentina on 24 November 2012, again as a replacement.

Kilcoyne was named in Ireland's training squad for the 2013 Six Nations Championship on 17 January 2013. He started for Ireland Wolfhounds in their friendly against England Saxons on 25 January 2013. Kilcoyne made his Six Nations debut on 2 February 2013, coming on as a replacement in Ireland opening 30–22 win against Wales. He again came on as a replacement against England on 10 February 2013, Scotland on 24 February 2013, and Italy on 16 March 2013.

Kilcoyne was named in the Ireland squad for the 2013 Ireland tour to North America on 19 May 2013. He started against the United States on 8 June 2013, his first start for Ireland. He came off the bench against Canada on 15 June 2013.

Kilcoyne started for Ireland Wolfhounds in their friendly against England Saxons on 25 January 2014. He was included in Ireland's squad for the 2014 Six Nations Championship fixture against England. Kilcoyne was named in the Ireland squad for their 2014 tour to Argentina on 19 May 2014. He came off the bench in the first test against Argentina on 7 June 2014. Kilcoyne started the second test against Argentina on 14 June 2014. Kilcoyne was named in the Ireland squad for the 2014 Guinness Series on 21 October 2014. He came off the bench during the 29–15 win against South Africa on 8 November 2014. Kilcoyne started against Georgia on 16 November 2014, scoring a try in the 49–7 win.

Kilcoyne was named in the 45-man training squad for the 2015 Rugby World Cup on 24 June 2015. He came off the bench in the first World Cup warm-up against Wales on 8 August 2015. Kilcoyne started the second warm-up against Scotland on 15 August 2015. He came off the bench in the warm-up game against Wales on 29 August 2015. However, he was left out of the final 31-man squad for the tournament.

On 25 May 2016, Kilcoyne was named in the 32-man Ireland squad to tour South Africa in a 3-test series. On 18 June 2016, Kilcoyne came on as a replacement in the second test against South Africa. On 7 November 2016, Kilcoyne was added to the senior Ireland squad for the 2016 end-of-year rugby union internationals. On 23 January 2017, Kilcoyne was named in the Ireland squad for the opening two rounds of the 2017 Six Nations Championship. On 2 March 2017, Kilcoyne was added to the Ireland squad for final two rounds of the 2017 Six Nations Championship. He was also selected in the squad for the 2017 Summer Tour against the United States and Japan, coming off the bench in all three tests. He came off the bench in Ireland's wins against South Africa and Argentina during the 2017 Autumn Internationals.

Kilcoyne was selected in the 31-man Ireland squad for the 2019 Rugby World Cup, having featured in the warm-up match against Wales. During the World Cup itself, Kilcoyne featured off the bench in Ireland's opening 27–3 win against Scotland and their shock 19–12 defeat against hosts Japan, and started in the 35–0 win against Russia, before again featuring off the bench in Ireland's 47–5 win against Samoa in their final pool game, and in the comprehensive 46-14 defeat against New Zealand in the quarter-finals, which brought an end to Ireland's 2019 World Cup.

Retained by new head coach Andy Farrell in his squad for the 2020 Six Nations Championship, Kilcoyne was used as a replacement in Ireland's 19–12 opening win against Scotland on 1 February 2020, their 24–14 win against defending champions Wales on 8 February, and their 24–12 defeat against England, before the tournament was suspended due to the COVID-19 pandemic.

Kilcoyne missed the Autumn Nations Cup due to injury, but returned to Ireland duty for the 2021 Six Nations Championship, featuring off the bench in their 21–16 away defeat against Wales in their opening fixture, the 48–10 away win against Italy and the 27–24 away win against Scotland, before wresting the number 1 jersey from Cian Healy and starting in the 32–18 win against England in the final round, though Kilcoyne had to leave the field early due to injury. During the 2021 July rugby union tests, Kilcoyne started in both Ireland's 39–31 victory against Japan and the 71–10 victory against the United States. Kilcoyne's first appearance in the 2022 Six Nations Championship came as a replacement during Ireland's 57–6 home win against Italy on 27 February, before he also came off the bench in the 32–15 away win against England on 12 March and the 26–5 home win against Scotland on 19 March that secured the Triple Crown for Ireland.

Kilcoyne was selected in the Ireland A panel that joined the senior Ireland team after round 7 of the 2022–23 United Rugby Championship to face an All Blacks XV on 4 November 2022; Kilcoyne featured as a replacement in Ireland A's 47–19 defeat. After Cian Healy pulled out shortly before kick-off due to injury, Kilcoyne was promoted to the bench for Ireland's opening fixture of the 2023 Six Nations Championship against Wales on 4 February, replacing Andrew Porter during the second-half of Ireland's 34–10 away win. With Healy also ruled out of the round two fixture against France on 11 February, Kilcoyne retained his place on the bench and came on during the second-half of Ireland's 32–19 win to earn his 50th cap, also featuring as a replacement in the 34–20 away win against Italy in round three on 25 February. Ireland went on win the grand slam.

Kilcoyne started for Ireland in their opening 2023 Rugby World Cup warm-up match against Italy on 5 August, scoring a try in their 33–17 win. He missed the remainder of Ireland's warm-up matches due to injury, but was selected in Ireland's 33-man squad for the 2023 Rugby World Cup. The injury ruled Kilcoyne out of Ireland's opening match of the tournament, but he returned to feature as a replacement in Ireland's 59–16 win against Tonga in Ireland's second pool game on 16 September, the 13–8 win against South Africa on 23 September, the 36–14 win against Scotland on 7 October, and the 28–24 defeat against New Zealand in the quarter-finals on 14 October.

== Statistics ==
=== International analysis by opposition ===
Against	Played	Won	Lost	Drawn	Tries	Points	% Won
Argentina	4	4	0	0	0	0	100
Canada	2	2	0	0	0	0	100
England	5	2	3	0	0	0	40
France	2	2	0	0	0	0	100
Georgia	1	1	0	0	1	5	100
Italy	7	6	1	0	1	5	85.71
Japan	4	3	1	0	0	0	75
New Zealand	2	0	2	0	0	0	0
Russia	1	1	0	0	0	0	100
Samoa	1	1	0	0	0	0	100
Scotland	8	7	1	0	0	0	87.5
South Africa	5	3	2	0	0	0	60
Tonga	1	1	0	0	0	0	100
United States	4	4	0	0	0	0	100
Wales	9	6	3	0	0	0	66.67
Total	56	43	13	0	2	10	76.79

Correct as of 14 October 2023

== Honours ==
=== Munster ===
- United Rugby Championship
  - Winner (1): 2022–23

=== Ireland ===
- Six Nations Championship:
  - Winner (1): 2023
- Grand Slam:
  - Winner (1): 2023
- Triple Crown:
  - Winner (2): 2022, 2023
