= Chris Henry (rugby union) =

Rugby union player from Northern Ireland

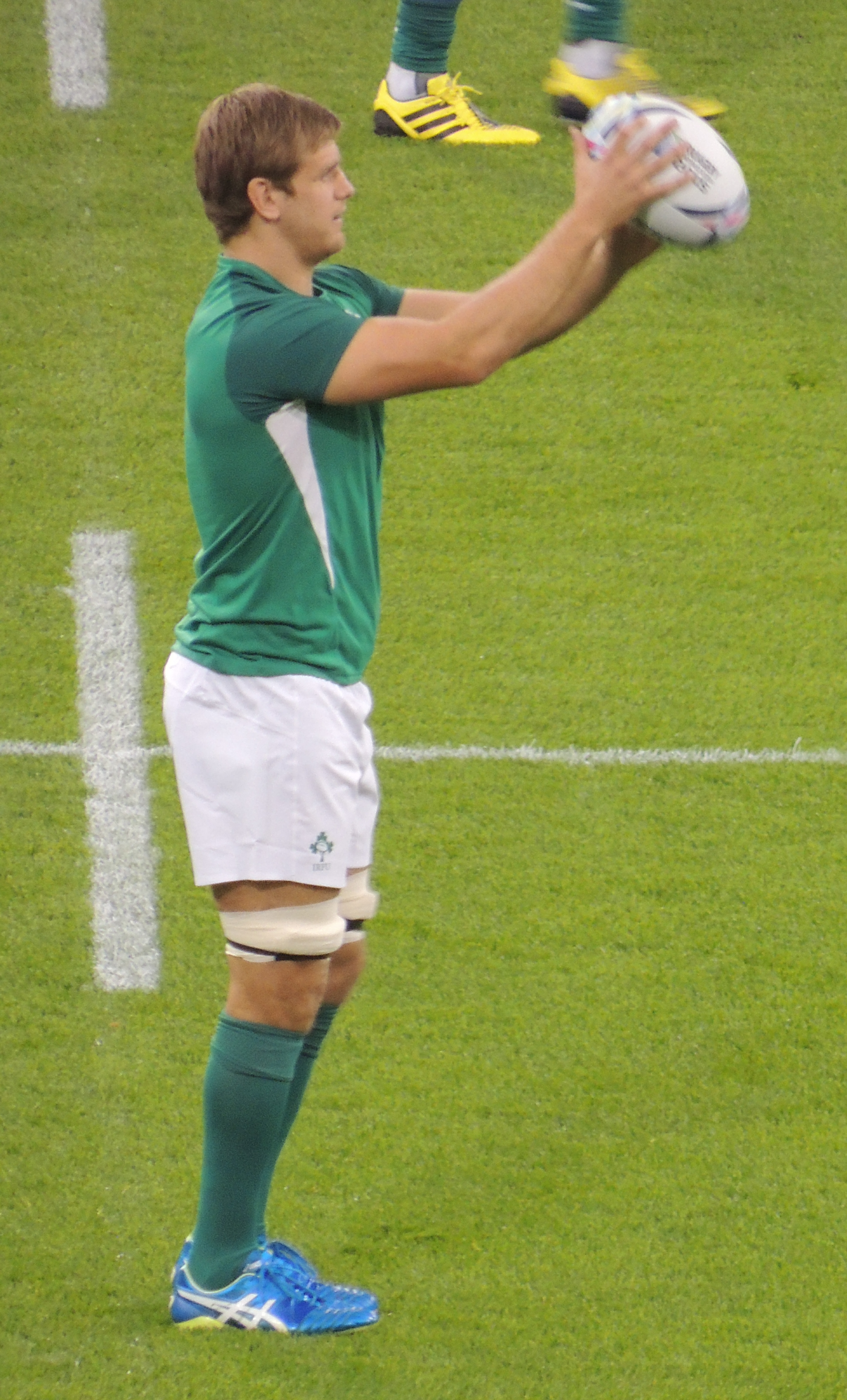
- Henry warming up prior to Ireland's opening match versus Canada during the 2015 Rugby World Cup
- Born: 17 October 1984 (age 42) Belfast, Northern Ireland
- Height: 6 ft 3 in (1.91 m)
- Weight: 16 st 11 lb (107 kg)
- School: Wallace High School
- University: Queen's University Belfast

Rugby union career
- Position: Back row
Senior career
Years	Team	Apps	(Points)
2006–2018	Ulster	184	(55)
- Correct as of 5 June 2021
International career
Years	Team	Apps	(Points)
2009–12	Wolfhounds	10	(20)
2010–2015	Ireland	24	(20)
- Correct as of 18 October 2015
National sevens team
Years	Team		Comps
- Ireland

Chris Henry (born 17 October 1984) is a former Irish rugby union rugby player. He played for Ireland, Ulster and Ballymena Rugby Club.

He was educated at the Wallace High School in Lisburn before going to Queen's University Belfast. In November 2009, he was named in Ireland's 39-man squad for the 2009 end of year rugby tests and again in the squad for the 2010 mid-year rugby test series when he received his first cap vs Australia.

In November 2014, Henry suffered a temporary blockage of a small blood vessel in his brain before Ireland were due to play South Africa in the end-of-year international series.

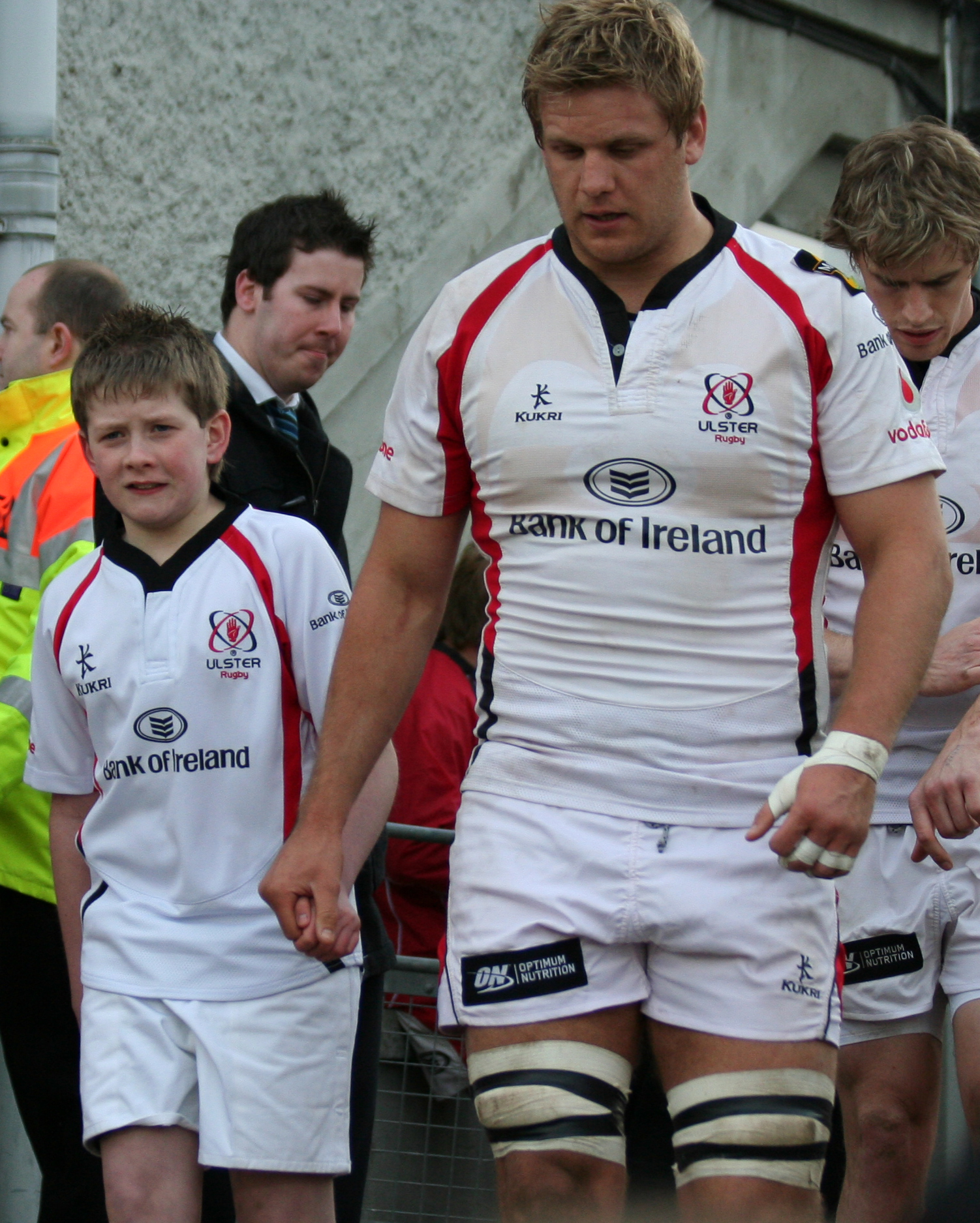
Henry leads out Ulster in a Magner's League match against Ospreys at Ravenhill, Belfast, April, 2010.

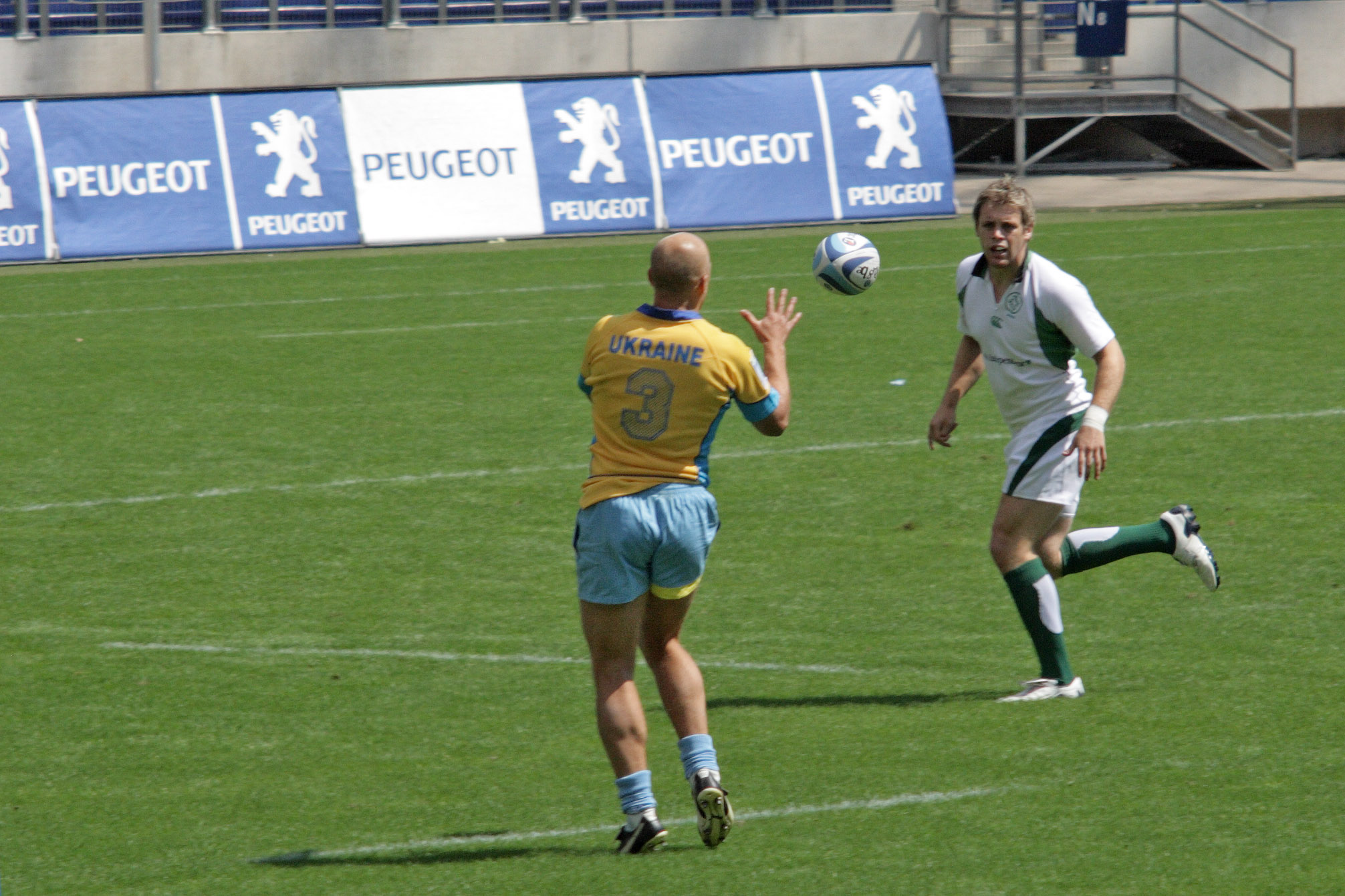
Chris Henry playing against Ukraine in the 2008 European Sevens

== Honours ==
=== Ireland A ===
- Churchill Cup:
  - Winner (1): 2009

=== Ireland ===
- Six Nations Championship: 2014
