= Eoin Reddan =

Irish rugby union player

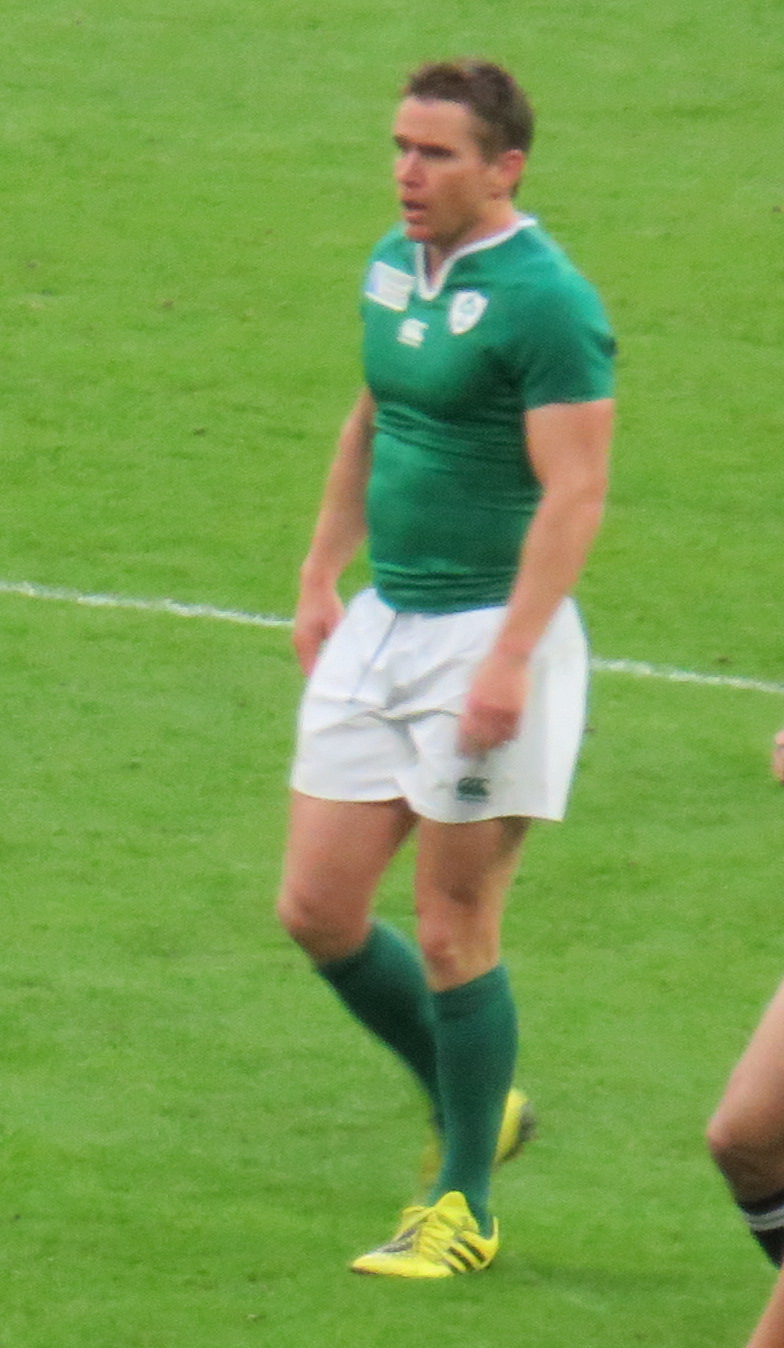
- Reddan playing for Ireland against Romania during the 2015 Rugby World Cup
- Born: Eoin Reddan; 20 November 1980 (age 45) Limerick, Ireland
- Height: 1.76 m (5 ft 9 in)
- Weight: 83 kg (13.1 st; 183 lb)
- School: Crescent College
- University: University of Limerick

Rugby union career
- Position: Scrum-half
Amateur team(s)
Years	Team	Apps	(Points)
- Old Crescent
–	Young Munster		
–	Lansdowne		
Senior career
Years	Team	Apps	(Points)
2001–03	Connacht	18	(20)
2003–05	Munster	29	(10)
2005–09	Wasps	125	(65)
2009–16	Leinster	140	(30)
- Correct as of 28 May 2016
International career
Years	Team	Apps	(Points)
2006–09	Ireland A	2	(5)
2006–16	Ireland	71	(10)
- Correct as of 25 June 2016

Eoin Reddan (born Limerick, Ireland, 20 November 1980) is a retired Irish rugby union player who played at scrum half. He initially attended the Jesuit boarding school, Clongowes Wood, before moving school to Crescent College Comprehensive where he captained the school side. On leaving school he studied at the University of Limerick.

== Club/Provincial career ==
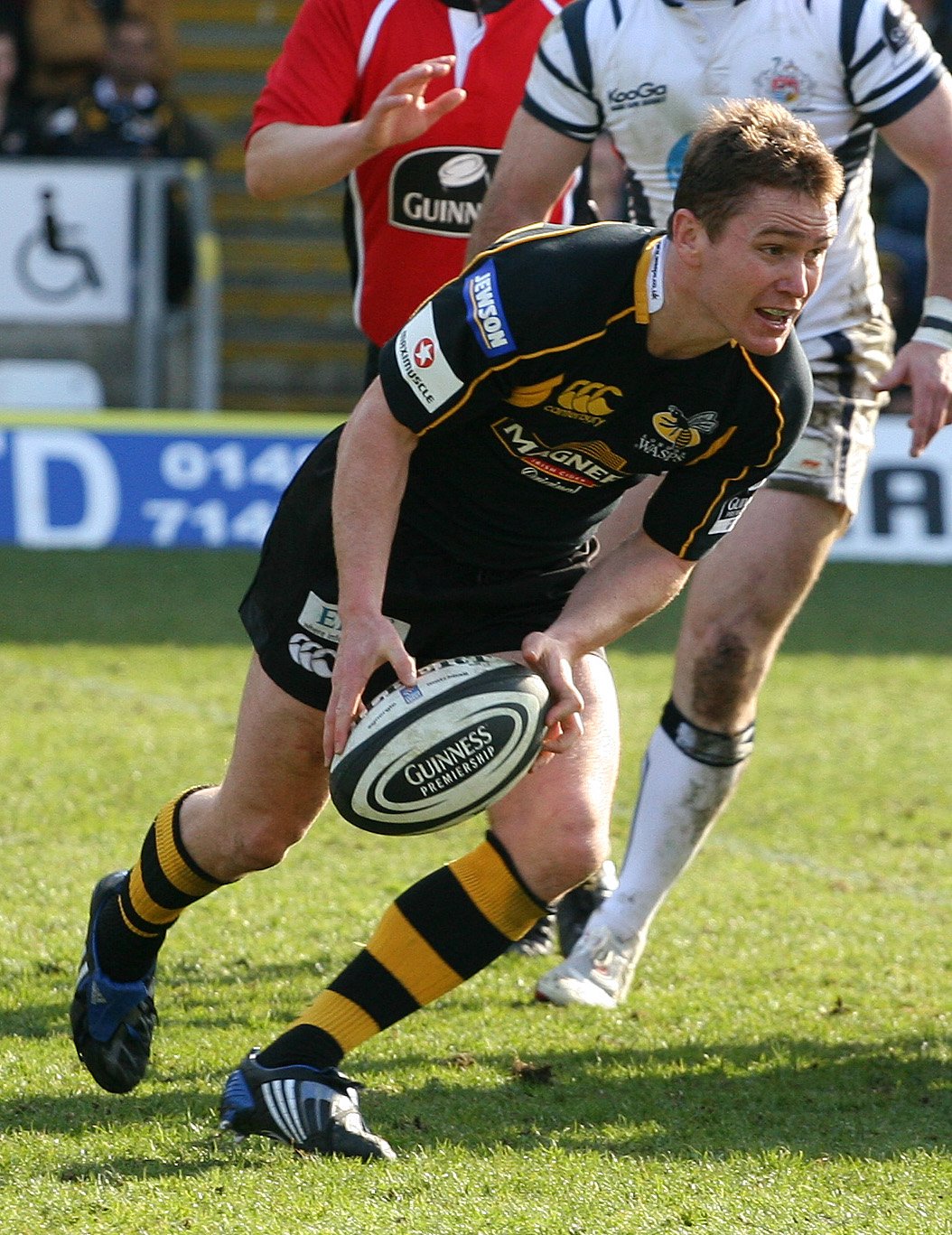
Reddan playing for Wasps against Bristol in 2009

Reddan began playing rugby at 13 years of age with Old Crescent. He earned caps for Munster at both schools and U19 levels. He played in the AIB League with both Old Crescent and Young Munster before signing for Connacht in 2001. He returned to Munster to sign a full-time contract in 2003 and debuted against Leinster in the Celtic League in September of that year making 27 league appearances over two seasons. Former Ireland and Connacht coach Warren Gatland signed Reddan to join London Wasps in 2005, where he succeeded Matt Dawson to become first choice scrum half, winning both a Heineken Cup in 2007 (scoring a try in the final) and the 2008 Guinness Premiership with them as well as captaining the side during the absence of Lawrence Dallaglio in 2007/08.

He joined Leinster in the summer of 2009 on a three-year contract. Reddan made his 100th appearance for Leinster during their Pro12 Grand Final play off game against Ulster on 17 May 2014. Reddan retired in June 2016 after making 140 appearances for Leinster.

== International career ==
First capped at Schools level, Reddan represented Ireland at U19 and Student levels, making his senior international debut in the 2006 Six Nations as a replacement against France at the Stade de France. His first start came against Argentina during the summer tour that year. He displaced Peter Stringer during the 2007 Rugby World Cup in the Irish team after Irelands disastrous start to the campaign, playing in their two final group games, losses against Argentina and France. He made his first Six Nations start for Ireland in their 16–11 victory over Italy at Croke Park in 2008 earning man of the match for his performance. He was then replaced by Tomás O'Leary as first choice Ireland scrum half. He was named in the Irish squad for the 2009 summer tour to America.

By the Rugby World Cup 2011 game against Australia, Reddan had replaced O'Leary as the first choice scrum half in the Ireland XV. He scored his second try for Ireland against Scotland on 10 March 2012.

Reddan appeared in three 2013 Six Nations matches as a replacement but broke his leg in a 13-13 draw with France that ruled him out for three months.

Reddan retired from all rugby in June 2016, making his 71st and final appearance for the national team from the bench in the Third Test of the 2016 Ireland Tour of South Africa, in Port Elizabeth.

== Personal life ==
Reddan married his long term girlfriend; Aoife O'Gorman on Friday 10 July 2009. The reception was held at The Lodge at Doonbeg, Co Clare, Ireland.
