= Devin Toner =

Irish rugby union player

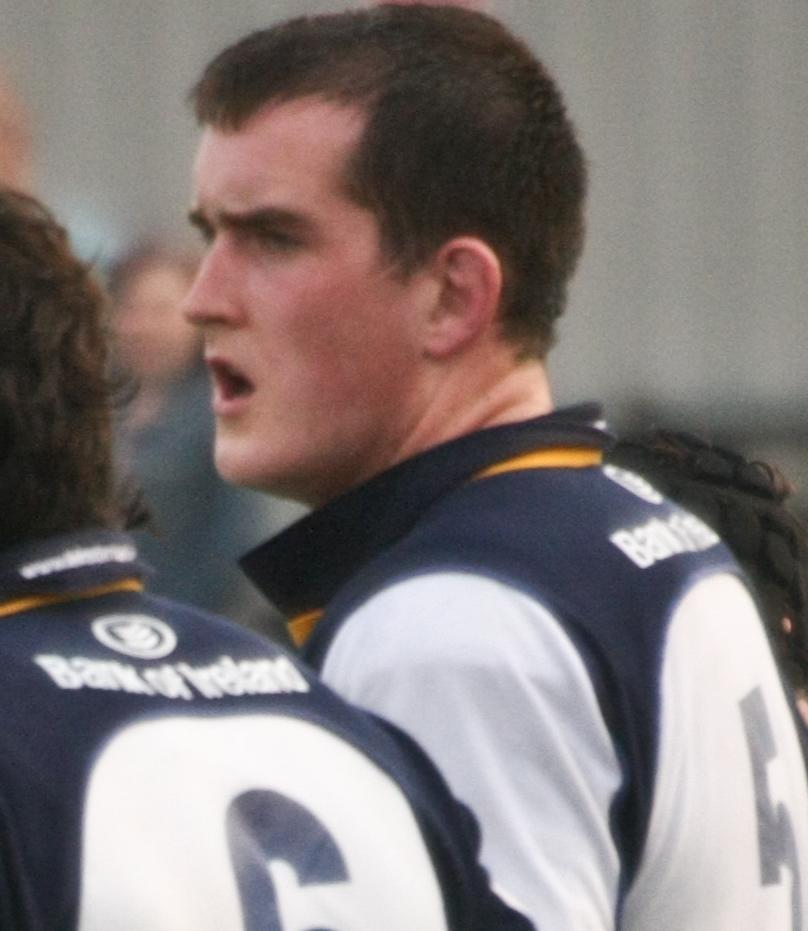
- Toner in 2008
- Born: 29 June 1986 (age 40) Moynalvey, County Meath, Ireland
- Height: 2.09 m (6 ft 10 1/2 in)
- Weight: 127 kg (20.0 st; 280 lb)
- School: Castleknock College
- University: University College Dublin

Rugby union career
- Position: Lock
Amateur team(s)
Years	Team	Apps	(Points)
- North Kildare
–	Lansdowne		
Senior career
Years	Team	Apps	(Points)
2006–2022	Leinster	280	(20)
- Correct as of 20 June 2022
International career
Years	Team	Apps	(Points)
2006	Ireland U21	9	
2009–2013	Ireland Wolfhounds	9	(5)
2010–2020	Ireland	70	(10)
- Correct as of 23 February 2020

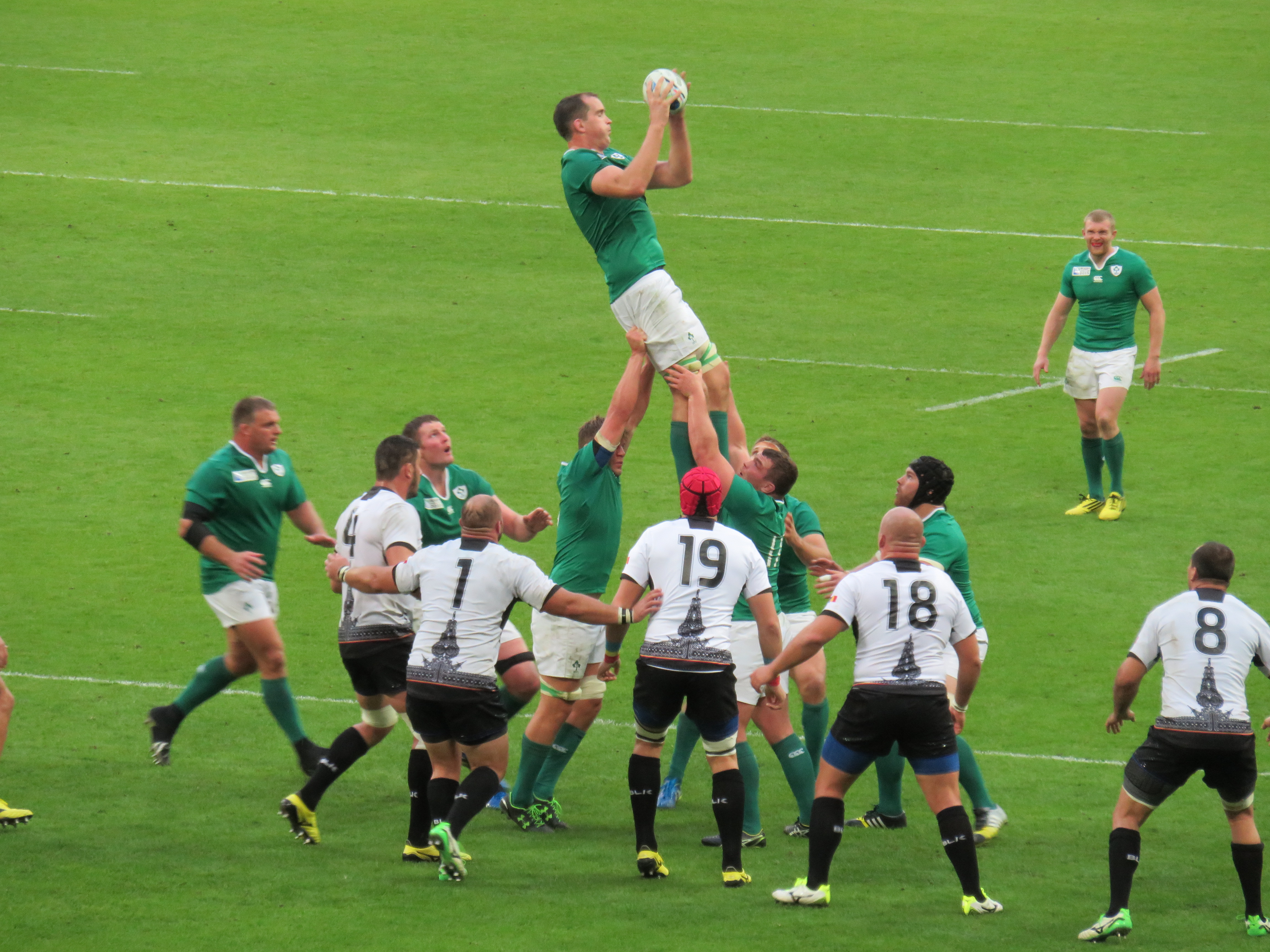
Toner winning a lineout for Ireland against Romania during the 2015 Rugby World Cup

Devin Toner (born 29 June 1986) is a former professional rugby player. He played in the second-row for Ireland and the Irish province Leinster. Measuring 6' 10" in height, he was the tallest player in the Heineken Cup and the 2015 Rugby World Cup. He wore a size 15 (Ireland) boot.

== Leinster ==
The former Castleknock College player established himself as a senior player with Leinster, chalking up more than a century of senior provincial caps. On 27 March 2021, he made his 262nd appearance for Leinster in a victory over Munster in the grand final of the 2020–21 Pro14, exceeding Gordon D'Arcy's provincial appearance record.

In March 2022, Toner announced that he would be retiring at the end of the 2021-22 season.

== Ireland ==
Toner made his Ireland Wolfhounds debut in the 2009 Churchill Cup against Canada in June 2009, and helped his side win the tournament in Denver with a win against the England Saxons.

He was selected by Ireland's head coach Declan Kidney to make his International debut for Ireland against Samoa on 13 November 2010 during the 2010 end of year rugby tests. He then came off the bench against New Zealand and Argentina during the following week. Toner was a regular starter for Ireland at lock from 2013 to 2018.

Toner was left out of Joe Schmidt's squad for the 2019 Rugby World Cup, with Schmidt instead selecting Jean Kleyn ahead of him, along with Iain Henderson, Tadhg Beirne and James Ryan as the other locks. Toner last appeared for Ireland in February 2020 in the Six Nations.

== Honours ==
Leinster

- European Rugby Champions Cup (4): 2009, 2011, 2012, 2018
- Pro14 (7): 2008, 2013, 2014, 2018, 2019, 2020, 2021

Ireland A

Churchill Cup (1): 2009

Ireland

- Six Nations Championship (3): 2014, 2015, 2018
- Grand Slam (1): 2018
