= Joe Schmidt (rugby union) =

New Zealand rugby union coach (born 1965)

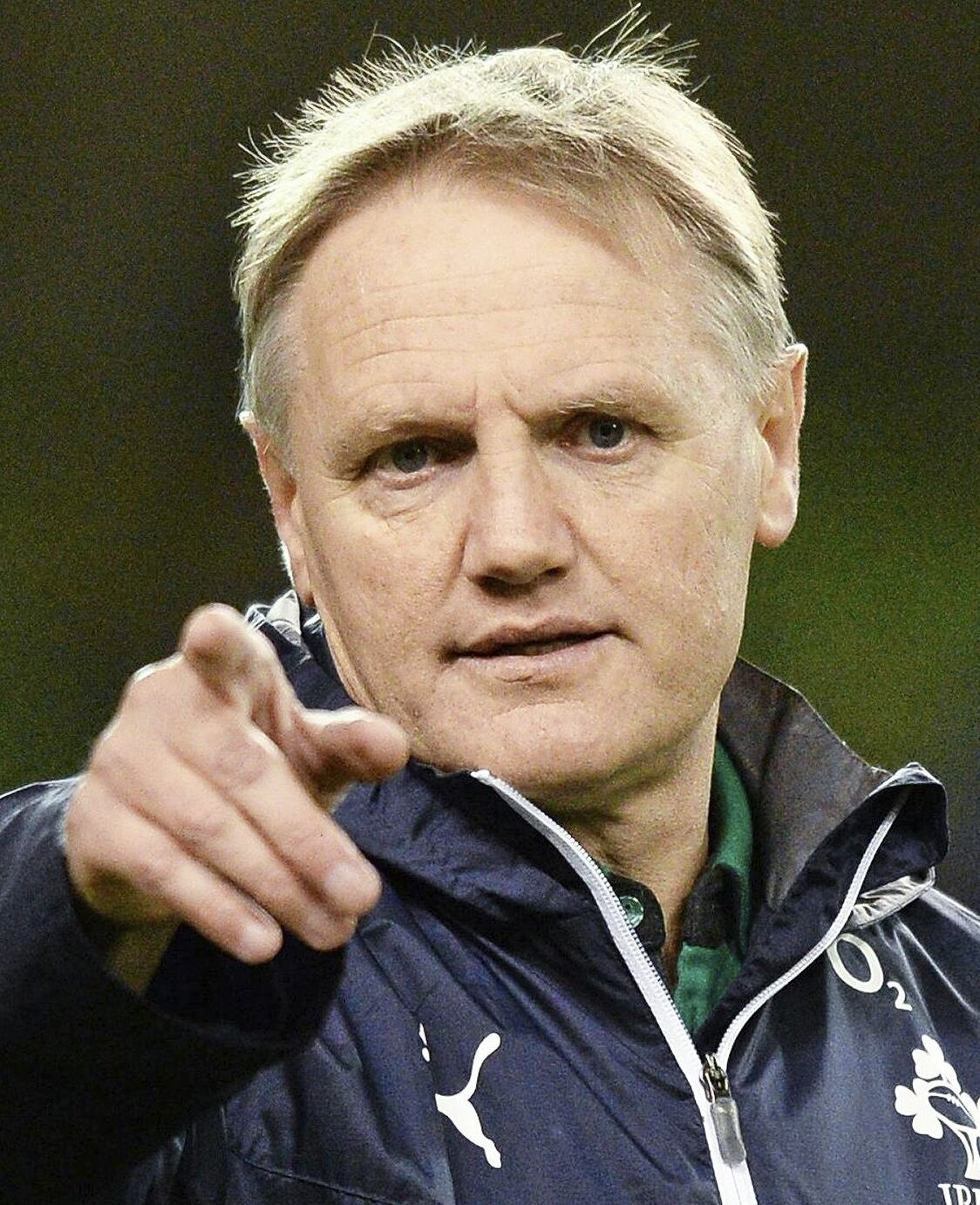
- Born: Josef Schmidt; 12 September 1965 (age 61) Kawakawa, New Zealand

Rugby union career
Coaching career
- Years: Team
- 2003–2004: Bay of Plenty (asst. coach)
- 2004–2007: Blues (asst. coach)
- 2007–2010: Clermont (asst. coach)
- 2010–2013: Leinster
- 2013–2019: Ireland
- 2022–2023: Blues (asst. coach)
- 2022–2023: New Zealand (selector, coach)
- 2024– 2026: Australia

Josef Schmidt HonFRCSI (born 12 September 1965) is a New Zealand rugby union coach, who is currently coach development advisor for Ulster, having previously been the head coach of the Australia national team, the Wallabies, from 2024 until 2026.

Schmidt coached Bay of Plenty, and was an assistant coach with the Blues and Clermont Auvergne. He joined Leinster as head coach in 2010, and brought unprecedented success to the province, reaching six finals and winning four trophies in three years.

He was then head coach of Ireland from 2013 to 2019. In six years under his leadership, Ireland won three Six Nations Championships, including a Grand Slam in 2018. Ireland were ranked number 1 in the World Rugby Rankings for the first time in their history in 2019, and recorded their first-ever wins over New Zealand. After leaving Ireland, he was the attack coach for the All Blacks from 2022 to 2023.

== Early life and career ==
Schmidt was born on 12 September 1965 in Kawakawa, Northland, New Zealand, and brought up in Woodville near Palmerston North. He went to Tararua College, in Pahiatua.

After training as a school teacher, Schmidt played rugby in New Zealand, including 29 games in the provincial championship for Manawatu. In 1991, during a gap year, Schmidt travelled to Ireland with his wife Kelly to take up an offer by FÁS to coach the underage teams (called the minis) of Mullingar RFC in the Midlands region and he also played amateur rugby in the Irish lower leagues. He then returned to New Zealand to take up a teaching position. He taught English and/or coached at Palmerston North Boys' High School, Napier Boys' High School, and Tauranga Boys' College, where he was deputy principal.

== Coaching career ==
=== New Zealand provincial rugby ===
Schmidt took up the option to coach New Zealand Schools, before leaving teaching to coach Bay of Plenty from 2003 to 2004. While at the Steamers he won the Ranfurly Shield defeating Auckland on 15 August 2004. The Steamers had one successful defence of the title before losing to Canterbury. Schmidt joined the Blues as assistant coach from 2004 to 2007 where, in his final year, they were knocked out in the semi-final.

=== Clermont Auvergne ===
Schmidt moved to Europe and joined Clermont Auvergne in 2007 as backs coach under Vern Cotter who he had previously worked with in Auckland. The side finished Top 14 runners-up twice in 2008 and 2009. In 2010 the side finally won the competition, after 11 appearances in the final. In Europe, Clermont made less of an impact in the competition than in the Top 14. Between 2007 and 2009, Clermont failed to progress past the group stages, but during the 2009–10 Heineken Cup, Schmidt's last season with Clermont, Clermont advanced to the quarter-finals, but lost to Leinster 29–28.

=== Leinster ===
Schmidt took over as Leinster head coach from Michael Cheika for the 2010–11 season. Under his leadership Leinster won the 2011 Heineken Cup, after beating Northampton Saints 33–22, and lost to Munster in the Celtic League Grand Final in May 2011. In the 2011–2012 season, he coached Leinster to a second Pro12 final, losing to the Ospreys 31–30, and led the team to the 2012 Heineken Cup Final, where Leinster retained their title beating Ulster 42–14. In his final year in charge, he coached Leinster to win the Amlin Challenge Cup and Pro12 titles, beating Stade Français 34–13 and Ulster 24–18 respectively. He ended his Leinster tenure with an overall record of 77 wins from 99 matches, which included a 75% win rate in the Pro 12 and an 85% win rate in Europe.

=== Ireland national team ===
==== 2013–2015 ====
The IRFU announced on 29 April 2013 that Schmidt would leave his position as Leinster coach to take over the Ireland coaching position left vacant by Declan Kidney. Schmidt's first contract would run until the end of the 2015–16 season. His first game in charge of Ireland was against Samoa on 9 November 2013 - Ireland won the match 40–9 The following week, Ireland were convincingly beaten by Australia, losing 32–15. However, on 24 November, Ireland had a 19–0 lead against New Zealand but went on to lose by 24–22 after Aaron Cruden scored an overtime conversion for New Zealand. On 15 March 2014, Schmidt's Ireland side defeated France in Paris 22–20 to lift the 2014 Six Nations Championship title, his first silverware with the nation. His only loss was to England at Twickenham 13–10. In June 2014, Ireland claimed their first ever test series win over Argentina during their 2014 Argentine test series. The first test, marked Ireland's first ever win over Argentina on Argentine soil, winning 29–17. In November 2014 during the end-of-year rugby union internationals, Ireland defeated South Africa, Georgia and Australia to move to third in the World Rugby Rankings.

In December 2014, Schmidt was named as the Philips Sports Manager of the Year and named as the manager of the Year at the 2014 RTÉ Sports awards.

On 1 March 2015, Ireland won their tenth test match in a row after a 19–9 win against England in the 2015 Six Nations Championship, equalling an Irish record set in 2003. That run came to an end in the next match on 15 March when Ireland lost 23–16 against Wales at the Millennium Stadium, a defeat that ended Ireland's hopes of winning the Grand Slam. During the final week of the 2015 Six Nations, Ireland, England, France and Wales were all in the chance to claim the title. With Wales' 61–20 win over Italy in the first fixture of the week, not only could France not claim the title, Ireland needed to beat Scotland by more than 21 points to knock Wales out of the equation and keep their chance of retaining the title alive - Ireland later recorded a 40–10 victory. The final match saw England and France play at Twickenham, and England needed to beat France by 27 points or more to claim the title. However, England only won by 20 points, 55–35, which saw Ireland claim their title for a second consecutive year.

On 22 July 2015, Schmidt extended his contract with Ireland until 2017. He became an Irish citizen on 2 September 2015.

Ireland opened their 2015 Rugby World Cup campaign on 19 September with a 50–7 win against Canada, and followed that up a week later with a 44–10 win against Romania at Wembley Stadium. In their third match of the World Cup they faced Italy, and won the game 16–9 to book their place in the quarter-finals. In their final match of the World Cup pool stage they faced France, and won the game 24–9 to top pool D. On 18 October 2015, Ireland lost by 43–20 to Argentina in the Quarter-finals.

==== 2016–2019 ====
Ireland finished in third place in the 2016 Six Nations Championship with two wins against Italy (58–15) and Scotland (35–25), a draw against Wales (16–16) and two losses to France (10–9) and England (21–10). In June 2016, Schmidt led Ireland to their first ever away victory over South Africa when the Irish won the first test of their tour of South Africa 26–20. This was despite playing with only 14 players on the field for more than 50 minutes of the game when CJ Stander was red-carded in the 22nd minute. In the second test, Ireland led South Africa 19–3 at half time, but 29 unanswered points in the second half saw South Africa draw level in the series. The final test saw South Africa clinch the series, with a 19–13 win over the Irish. On 24 October 2016, Schmidt signed a new contract with the Irish Rugby Football Union to continue as Ireland head coach until the end of the 2019 Rugby World Cup. On 5 November 2016, in Ireland's first match of the Autumn Internationals, Ireland defeated New Zealand for the very first time in a test match, winning 40–29. The following week, they defeated Canada in Dublin 52–21, before playing New Zealand again, on this occasion, losing 21–9. On 26 November, Ireland completed a rare triple-win, defeating Australia 27–24, to become the first team since England in 2003, to beat Australia, New Zealand and South Africa in a single year.

New Zealand Rugby offered Schmidt a coaching position within the New Zealand set-up by replacing Wayne Smith and thereby offering him a path of becoming the future New Zealand Head Coach following the departure of their current head coach Steve Hansen, however, he rejected this offer and signed a two-year extension to stay with Ireland up to the conclusion of Ireland's participation in the 2019 Rugby World Cup in Japan.

During the 2017 Six Nations Championship, Ireland ended England's 18-match unbeaten run when they defeated them in Dublin 13–9 in the final week of the Championship, which secured Ireland a second-place finish. This came despite a first round loss to Scotland 27–22 and a 22–9 loss to Wales in Cardiff. Schmidt later led a depleted Ireland team on a victorious June tour winning all three games convincingly; 55–19 win over the United States followed by a 2–0 series win over Japan, winning 50–22 and 35–13. During the 2017 Autumn Internationals, Ireland won all three games, against South Africa (38–3) a record victory, Fiji (23–20), and Argentina (28–19) to move up to third in the World Rugby Rankings.

On 10 March 2018, Ireland claimed the 2018 Six Nations Championship with a round to go, and rose to second place in the world rankings. This came, following victories over France (15–13), Italy (56–19), Wales (37–27) and Scotland (28–8). Their Championship was complete with a 24–15 victory over England, their first since 2010 at Twickenham, in the final round to claim their first Grand Slam since 2009. In June 2018, he led his side to a 2–1 series victory over Australia, their first series win in Australia since 1979.

On 17 November 2018, in the end-of-year internationals, Ireland beat New Zealand for the second time (and the first time on Irish soil). Following this victory, speculation was rife that Schmidt would not renew his contract as Ireland's head coach and that he would put his family first and return to New Zealand.

On 25 November 2018, at the World Rugby Awards which were hosted in Monaco, Joe Schmidt was awarded the World Rugby Coach of the Year. He is only the second Irish Rugby Football Union coach to receive the award (the first Irish Rugby Football Union Coach to win it was Declan Kidney back in 2009). He was not present at the ceremony and Ireland Rugby Vice-Captain Peter O'Mahony accepted the award on Schmidt's behalf. At the same awards, Ireland was awarded World Rugby Team of the Year and Irish fly-half Johnny Sexton walked away with World Rugby Player of the Year.

On 26 November 2018 Schmidt announced his retirement from coaching after the 2019 Rugby World Cup. He began his final year as Ireland coach with a 32–20 loss to England on 2 February in the first round of the 2019 Six Nations Championship. This was Ireland's first home loss since 2016, and their first loss to England at the Aviva Stadium since 2013. Ireland returned to winning ways against Scotland the following week, winning 22–13 before back to back wins over Italy and France and defeat away to Grand Slam winning Wales on 16 March to finish in third place in the championship.

Schmidt guided Ireland to World number 1 in the World Rugby Rankings for the first time in their history when his Irish teams defeated Wales back-to-back, home and away, in the 2019 Rugby World Cup warm-up matches.

At the 2019 Rugby World Cup, Ireland began with a 27–3 win against Scotland on 22 September before losing to Japan a week later 19–12 in the Shizuoka Stadium. Wins over Russia by 35-0 and Samoa by 47-5 set up a quarter-final against New Zealand on 19 October. In Schmidt's last game in charge, New Zealand won 46–14 to eliminate Ireland from the World Cup at the quarter-final stage. Schmidt later analysed that not prioritising the 2019 Six Nations Championship ahead of the 2019 Rugby World Cup subsequently resulted in Ireland underperforming in the Rugby World Cup.

Former Ireland defence coach Andy Farrell became the new head coach of the Irish team in January 2020.

==== Ireland head coaching record by opponent ====
Opponent	Played	Won	Draw	Lost	Win %	Points for	Points against
Argentina	5	4	0	1	80%	156	130
Australia	6	4	0	2	67%	120	134
Canada	2	2	0	0	100%	102	28
England	8	3	0	5	38%	124	177
Fiji	1	1	0	0	100%	23	20
France	7	6	0	1	86%	133	86
Georgia	1	1	0	0	100%	49	7
Italy	9	9	0	0	100%	374	96
Japan	3	2	0	1	67%	85	35
New Zealand	5	2	0	3	40%	101	129
Romania	1	1	0	0	100%	44	10
Russia	1	1	0	0	100%	35	0
South Africa	5	3	0	2	60%	132	89
Samoa	2	2	0	0	100%	87	14
Scotland	8	7	0	1	88%	230	114
United States	2	2	0	0	100%	112	33
Wales	10	5	1	4	50%	197	180
Total	76	55	1	20	72.37%	2104	1282

Updated as of 19 October 2019

=== Technical advisor and World Rugby ===
In February 2020, Schmidt worked with the Spanish national team for a day in advance of their Rugby Europe Championship match with Georgia and he was due to co-coach the Classic All Blacks team in their match against Spain in May 2020. However, the match was cancelled due to the COVID-19 pandemic.

Schmidt was appointed World Rugby's director of rugby and high performance in October 2020, a newly created position that included responsibility on issues related to player welfare, training and education. Schmidt resigned a year later from this position to spend more time with his family in New Zealand.

=== Return to New Zealand ===
Schmidt returned to the Blues, joining the coaching staff in a part-time supportive role to Leon MacDonald for the 2022 Super Rugby Pacific season, following the departure of Tana Umaga. He was cited as being the main influence behind the Blues' appearance in their first Super Rugby final since 2003. They were defeated by the Crusaders 21–7 at Eden Park to finish the season as runners-up.

=== New Zealand national team ===
In late 2021, it was announced that Schmidt would take up the position of selector for the New Zealand national team following the tour by Ireland to New Zealand in 2022. Following failed COVID-19 tests for New Zealand head coach Ian Foster and his assistants John Plumtree and Scott McLeod, Schmidt was called in to coach New Zealand ahead of their first test against Ireland. New Zealand won the first test 42–19, but lost the final two tests (12–23 and 22–32), earning Ireland their first test victories on New Zealand soil and first series victory over New Zealand.

On 17 August 2022, it was announced that Schmidt would become an integral part of the All Blacks' coaching setup, assuming the role of attack coach. He was credited as being the influential force behind New Zealand winning the 2022 Rugby Championship

=== Australia national team ===
On 19 January 2024, Schmidt was appointed the new coach of Australia on a two-year contract, replacing Eddie Jones. He becomes the third New Zealander to serve as head coach of Australia after Robbie Deans and Dave Rennie. He officially commenced his duties on 1 March 2024.

Schmidt coached his first match as coach of Australia on 6 July 2024 against Wales, which saw Australia winning 25–16.

In February 2025, it was announced that Schmidt would be stepping down as coach of Australia following the conclusion of the 2025 Rugby Championship. He made it clear that while he enjoyed his work in the role, to the point where he would accept moving to an advisory role if that would allow him to stay, his decision was motivated by a desire to spend more time with his family.

On 30 April 2025, Rugby Australia revealed that Schmidt would extend his tenure as coach of Australia into mid-2026, with Les Kiss to succeed him as head coach of Australia afterwards.

On 16 August 2025, in the opening round of the 2025 Rugby Championship, with his side 22–0 down to South Africa after 20 minutes, he led the team to a 38–22 comeback including 38 unanswered points. This was also the first time Australia had won at Ellis Park since 1963.

He left the Wallabies following the 2026 Nations Championship Southern Hemisphere Series, with Les Kiss taking charge.

==== Australia head coaching record by opponent ====
Opponent	Played	Won	Draw	Lost	Win %	Points for	Points against
Argentina	4	2	0	2	50%	101	138
England	2	1	0	1	50%	49	62
Fiji	1	1	0	0	100%	21	18
Georgia	1	1	0	0	100%	40	29
Ireland	2	0	0	2	0%	38	68
France	1	0	0	1	0%	33	48
New Zealand	2	0	0	2	0%	41	64
South Africa	4	1	0	3	25%	79	115
Scotland	1	0	0	1	0%	13	27
Wales	3	3	0	0	100%	113	64
Italy	1	0	0	1	0%	19	26
British & Irish Lions	3	1	0	2	33.3%	67	68
Total	17	8	0	9	47.06%	374	410

Updated as of 7 September 2025

=== Return to Irish Rugby ===
He joined Ulster ahead of the 2026-27 season as coach development advisor, a newly created role intended to support the development of coaches across the province at all levels of the game, from schools, clubs, the provincial academy and the professional team.

== Honours ==
=== International ===
- Six Nations Championship
  - Winner: 2014, 2015, 2018
- Grand Slam
  - Winner: 2018
- Triple Crown
  - Winner: 2018
- Millennium Trophy
  - Winner: 2015, 2017, 2018
- Centenary Quaich
  - Winner: 2014, 2015, 2016, 2018, 2019
- Philips Sports Manager of the Year
  - Winner: 2014, 2018
- Manager of the Year - RTÉ Sports awards
  - Winner: 2014
- World Rugby
- World Rugby Coach of the Year
  - Winner: 2018

=== Club Honours ===
Bay of Plenty (as assistant coach)

- Ranfurly Shield
  - Winner: 2004 (1 successful defence)

Leinster

- Heineken Cup
  - Winner: 2011, 2012
- Pro12
  - Winner: 2013
  - Runners-up: 2011, 2012
- European Challenge Cup
  - Winners: 2013

Clermont Auvergne (as assistant coach)

- Top 14
  - Winner: 2010
  - Runners-up: 2008, 2009

== Coaching approach ==
He is known for his attention to detail, knowledge of the game of rugby, and "sharp tactical brain".

== Personal life ==
On 2 September 2015, Schmidt was granted Irish citizenship. His son Luke was diagnosed with epilepsy at the age of four and Schmidt has become involved with Epilepsy Ireland. In recognition of Schmidt's high-profile advocacy for epilepsy services, he was awarded an Honorary Fellowship of the Royal College of Surgeons in Ireland (HonFRCSI) in May 2019.

Schmidt missed the preparations for the 2019 Rugby World Cup warm-up match with Italy in Dublin to be by the bedside of his mother as she died. He later said at a press conference in Japan, when asked of his future plans after the World Cup, "we'll probably stay in Ireland for some time. We've become pretty settled there" and "A big motivator for me to get back [to New Zealand] was family and unfortunately we lost our mum recently." However, Schmidt moved with his family back to New Zealand in 2020, as he explained in the best interests of his youngest son Luke, who was struggling with his epilepsy under the COVID-19 lockdown restrictions imposed by the Irish Government.

Sporting positions
Preceded by (Republic of Ireland) Declan Kidney	Ireland national rugby union team coach 2013–2019	Succeeded by (England) Andy Farrell
Preceded by (Australia) Eddie Jones	Australia national rugby union team coach 2024–2026	Succeeded by Les Kiss
