= Mike Ross (rugby union) =

Irish rugby union player

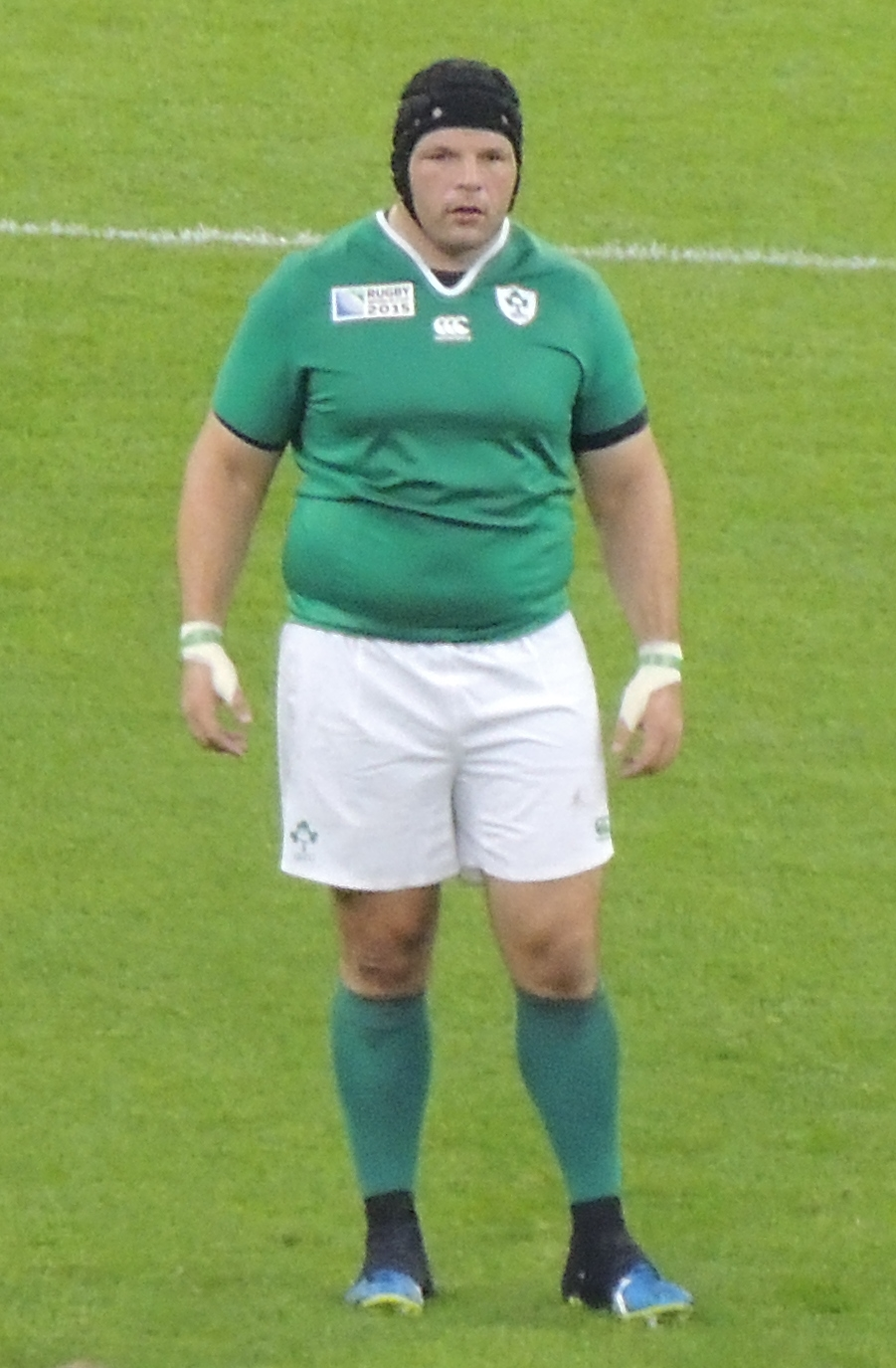
- Mike Ross playing for Ireland during the 2015 Rugby World Cup
- Born: Michael Robert Ross; 21 December 1979 (age 46) Cork, Ireland
- Height: 1.88 m (6 ft 2 in)
- Weight: 125 kg (19.7 st; 276 lb)
- School: St. Colman's College
- University: University College Cork

Rugby union career
- Position: Tighthead Prop
Amateur team(s)
Years	Team	Apps	(Points)
- UCC
–	Cork Constitution		
–	Clontarf FC		
Senior career
Years	Team	Apps	(Points)
2005–2006	Munster	1	(0)
2006–2009	Harlequins	84	(0)
2009–2017	Leinster	151	(10)
- Correct as of 26 April 2017
International career
Years	Team	Apps	(Points)
2007–2015	Ireland Wolfhounds	13	(0)
2009–2016	Ireland	61	(0)
- Correct as of 25 June 2016

Mike Ross (born 21 December 1979) is a retired Irish rugby union footballer who played prop for Irish club Leinster and the Ireland national rugby team.

He attended St. Colman's College, Fermoy, as a day-boy from 1992 to 1998, and he played his club rugby at this time with Fermoy RFC. The former UCC and Cork Constitution player made the move from Munster and played for three years at the highest level in England, making his name in the English Premiership with Harlequins.

Following a move to Leinster, he featured in a number of Ireland squads and lined out for the Wolfhounds, as well as making his debut for the National team on the 2009 Summer tour to Canada and the USA. Ross later made his Six Nations debut in 2011 against Italy. Following that, he was a mainstay on the Irish team until 2016. His scrummaging was widely regarded as key to Leinster's Heineken Cup & Ireland's World Cup progression to the Quarter Final in 2011.

== Club career ==
After starting his rugby career with Munster, Ross spent three years with Harlequins in England before signing for Leinster in 2009. The move back to Irish rugby was seen as a move to bolster his playing opportunities to play international rugby with Ireland. He scored his first ever professional try on 5 April 2013, in an Amlin Challenge Cup Quarter Final victory away to London Wasps.

After a career that has seen him win two Six Nations titles, represent Ireland at two World Cups as well as winning two Heineken Cups, a Challenge Cup and two PRO12 titles with Leinster, Ross confirmed that he would retire from rugby at the end of the 2016–17 season.

== International career ==
On 23 May 2009, Ross made his debut for Ireland against Canada in Vancouver, coming on as a replacement in a 25–6 win. He made his first start in the game against the USA on 31 May. Ross made his Six Nations debut when he was given the responsibility of leading the scrum against the Italians on 5 February 2011.
