= 2012–13 Ulster Rugby season =

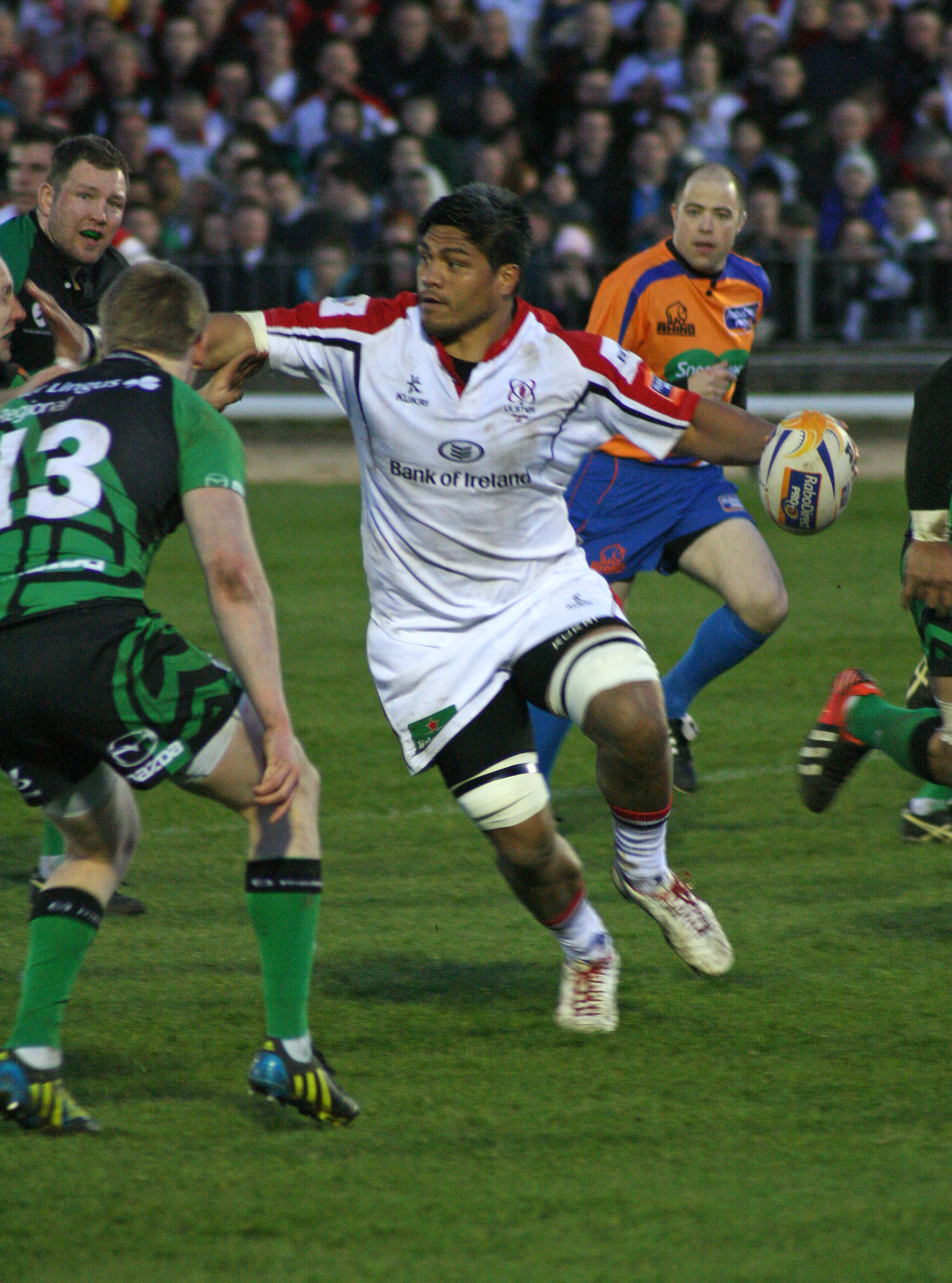
- Nick Williams playing against Connacht, 19 April 2013
- Ground: Ravenhill Stadium (Capacity: 12,500)
- Coach(es): David Humphreys (Director of Rugby); Mark Anscombe (Head Coach)
- Captain: Johann Muller
- Top scorer: Ruan Pienaar (205)
- Most tries: Andrew Trimble (12)
- League(s): Heineken Cup (quarter-finalists); Pro12 (finalists)
1st kit	2nd kit

The 2012–13 season was Ulster's 19th season since the advent of professionalism in rugby union, and their first under head coach Mark Anscombe, who replaced Brian McLaughlin, after McLaughlin failed to get his contract re-signed. They competed in the Pro12 and the European Rugby Champions Cup.

Major signings included number eight Nick Williams from the now defunct Aironi, wing Tommy Bowe returning from his four-year stay at the Ospreys, and flanker Roger Wilson returning after four years with Northampton Saints. Hooker Rob Herring joined from Western Province.

Centre Nevin Spence died, along with his brother Graham and father Noel, in an accident at the family farm in Hillsborough, County Down, on 15 September 2012, where they were overcome by fumes in a slurry tank. Spence's sister was treated in hospital and survived the accident. As a mark of respect for Spence, a minute's silence was observed at many rugby games in Britain and Ireland the following week. A memorial service was held at Ravenhill Stadium, the home ground of Ulster Rugby, on Sunday 23 September 2012.

Ulster started the season with 13 consecutive wins in all competitions, the longest unbeaten run in their history. They finished top of the table in the Pro12 with 17 wins, and after beating Welsh side Scarlets in the semi-finals 28–17, it was an all- Ireland final between Ulster and Leinster. Leinster were the eventual champions, defeating Anscombe's side 24–18. Scrum-half Ruan Pienaar was the league's second-top scorer with 172 points. Ulster won the Fair Play Award, and Nick Williams was the Players' Player of the Year. Williams and centre Luke Marshall made the Pro12 Dream Team. Andrew Trimble's try against Connacht was Try of the Season. They topped their pool in the Champions Cup with five wins out of six, qualifying for the quarter-finals, where they lost 27–16 to Saracens.

Ruan Pienaar was Ulster's top scorer with 205 points. Andrew Trimble was the top try-scorer with twelve tries, and was named Ulster's Player of the Year. Nick Williams was IRUPA Players' Player of the Year, and Craig Gilroy won the IRUPA Try of the Year award.

== Staff ==
=== Senior team ===
Position	Name	Nationality
Director of Rugby	David Humphreys	Ireland
Head coach	Mark Anscombe	New Zealand
Assistant coach (backs)	Neil Doak	Ireland
Assistant coach (defence)	Jonny Bell	Ireland
Head of strength and conditioning	Jonny Davis	Ireland
Strength and conditioning coach	Kevin Geary	Ireland
Team doctor	David Irwin	Ireland
Head physiotherapist	Gareth Robinson	Ireland
Physiotherapist	Alan McAldin	Ireland
Team administration co-ordinator	Sarah Sherry	Ireland
Resource manager	Mick Ennis	Australia
Team manager	David Millar	Ireland

=== Academy ===
Position	Name	Nationality
Elite performance development manager	Allen Clarke	Ireland
High performance manager	Gary Longwell	Ireland
Academy schools coach	Brian McLaughlin	Ireland
Elite player development officer	Niall Malone	Ireland
Strength and conditioning coach	Chris Shields	Ireland
Strength and conditioning coach	David Drake	Ireland

== Squad ==
=== Senior squad ===
==== Players in (Season 2012/2013) ====
- (Ireland) Tommy Bowe from (Wales) Ospreys
- (Australia) Sean Doyle from (Australia) Southern Districts
- (South Africa) Rob Herring from (South Africa) Western Province
- (Ireland) Ricky Lutton from (Ireland) Belfast Harlequins
- (Ireland) Niall O'Connor from (Ireland) Connacht Rugby
- (Ireland) Neil Walsh (unattached, trial)
- (New Zealand) Nick Williams from (Italy) Aironi
- (Ireland) Roger Wilson from (England) Northampton

==== Promoted from academy ====
- (Ireland) Michael Allen
- (Ireland) Ali Birch
- (Ireland) Chris Cochrane
- (Ireland) Michael Heaney
- (Ireland) Iain Henderson

==== Players out (Season 2012/2013) ====
- (Ireland) Tim Barker to (Ireland) Rainey Old Boys
- (Ireland) Jerry Cronin to (England) Doncaster Knights
- (Scotland) Simon Danielli retired
- (Ireland) Willie Faloon to (Ireland) Connacht Rugby
- (Ireland) Conor Gaston to (England) London Irish
- (Ireland) Ian Humphreys to (England) London Irish
- (Ireland) Andi Kyriacou to (Wales) Cardiff Blues
- (Ireland) James McKinney to (England) Rotherham Titans
- (Ireland) Ian Porter one-year sabbatical
- (Ireland) Nevin Spence deceased
- (South Africa) Stefan Terblanche retired
- (South Africa) Pedrie Wannenburg to (France) Castres
- (Ireland) Ian Whitten to (England) Exeter Chiefs

Ulster Rugby squad
**Props**: (Ireland) **Tom Court** (28 apps, 22 starts, 10 pts); (New Zealand) **John Afoa** (26 points, 20 starts); (Ireland) Callum Black (28 apps, 9 starts); (Ireland) **Declan Fitzpatrick** (9 apps, 6 starts); (Ireland) Ricky Lutton (6 apps, 3 starts); (Ireland) Adam Macklin (5 apps, 2 starts); (Ireland) Kyle McCall, Ballynahinch (1 app); (Ireland) Paddy McAllister (no apps); **Hookers**: (Ireland) **Rory Best** (17 apps, 16 starts, 5 pts); (Ireland) **Rob Herring** (21 apps, 10 starts, 5 pts); (Ireland) Nigel Brady (9 apps, 5 starts); (Ireland) Niall Annett (5 apps); **Locks**: (Ireland) **Dan Tuohy** (20 apps, 17 starts, 5 pts); (South Africa) **Johann Muller** (c) (17 apps, 16 starts); (Ireland) **Iain Henderson** (19 apps, 14 starts, 10 pts); (Ireland) Lewis Stevenson (19 apps, 14 starts); (Ireland) Neil McComb (16 apps, 9 starts, 5 pts); (Ireland) Alan O'Connor (2 apps)	**Back row**: (South Africa) Robbie Diack* (23 apps, 20 starts, 30 pts); (New Zealand) Nick Williams (23 apps, 20 starts, 35 pt); (Ireland) **Chris Henry** (18 apps, 18 starts, 5 pts); (Ireland) Mike McComish (20 apps, 10 starts); (Ireland) **Roger Wilson** (13 apps, 8 starts, 5 pts); (Australia) Sean Doyle* (4 apps, 3 starts); (Ireland) **Stephen Ferris** (4 apps, 3 starts); (Ireland) Ali Birch (4 apps, 2 starts, 5 pts); (Ireland) Conor Joyce (1 app, 1 start); **Scrum-halves**: (South Africa) **Ruan Pienaar** (21 apps, 20 starts, 202 pts); (Ireland) Paul Marshall (22 apps, 13 starts, 20 pts); (Ireland) Michael Heaney (9 apps, 3 starts); **Fly-halves**: (Ireland) Paddy Jackson (24 apps, 20 starts, 143 pts); (Ireland) Niall O'Connor (8 apps, 4 starts, 45 pts)	**Centres**: (Ireland) **Darren Cave** (27 apps, 24 starts, 15 pts); (Ireland) **Paddy Wallace** (15 apps, 13 starts, 5 pts); (Ireland) Michael Allen (18 apps, 12 starts, 10 pts); (Ireland) Luke Marshall (18 apps, 10 starts, 5 pts); (Ireland) Stuart Olding (14 apps, 10 starts, 25 pts); (Ireland) Chris Farrell (1 app, 1 start); **Wings**: (Ireland) **Andrew Trimble** (26 apps, 25 starts, 60 pts); (Ireland) **Craig Gilroy** (20 apps, 13 starts, 10 pts); (Ireland) **Tommy Bowe** (14 apps, 12 starts, 30 pts); (Ireland) Chris Cochrane (6 apps, 4 starts); (Ireland) Neil Walsh (2 apps, 1 start); **Fullbacks**: (Ireland) Jared Payne (22 apps, 21 starts, 40 pts); (Ireland) Ricky Andrew, Ballymena (8 apps, 6 starts, 5 pts); (Ireland) Peter Nelson, Dungannon (9 apps, 3 starts, 5 pts); (Ireland) Adam D'Arcy* (4 apps, 2 starts)
(c) denotes the team captain, **Bold** denotes internationally capped players. Italics denotes academy players who appeared in the senior team.^{*} denotes players qualified to play for Ireland on residency or dual nationality. Players and their allocated positions from the Ulster Rugby website.

=== Academy squad ===
==== Players in ====
- (Ireland) Alan O'Connor
- (Ireland) Rory Scholes
- (Ireland) Jake Caulfield

==== Players out ====
- (Ireland) Ryan Jablonski
- (Ireland) John Burns
- (Ireland) David O'Mahony
- (Ireland) David McGuigan
- (Ireland) Blane McIlroy

Ulster Rugby Academy squad
**Props**: (Ireland) Jake Caulfield, Malone (1); (Ireland) Conor Carey, Ballynahinch (3); (Ireland) Kyle McCall, Ballynahinch (3); **Hookers**: (Ireland) Jonny Murphy, Ballynahinch (2); **Locks**: (Ireland) Alan O'Connor, Malone (1); (Ireland) James Simpson, Ballynahinch (2)	**Back row**: (Ireland) Neil Faloon, Ballynahinch (2); (Ireland) Conor Joyce, Malone (2); (Ireland) Sean O'Connell, Belfast Harlequins (2); **Scrum-halves**: (Ireland) Blane McIlroy (3); **Fly-halves**: (Ireland) Stuart Olding, Belfast Harlequins (2)	**Centres**: (Ireland) Chris Farrell, Dungannon (2); **Back three**: (Ireland) Ricky Andrew, Ballymena (4); (Ireland) Peter Nelson, Dungannon (2); (Ireland) Rory Scholes, Belfast Harlequins (1)
Number in brackets indicates players stage in the three-year academy cycle.^{*} denotes players qualified to play for Ireland on residency or dual nationality. Players and their allocated positions from the Ulster Rugby website.

== Season record ==
Competition	Played	Won	Drawn	Lost	PF	PA	PD	TF	TA
2012-13 Heineken Cup	7	5	0	2	142	82	60	13	7
2011-12 Pro12	24	18	1	5	623	389	234	65	37
Total	31	23	1	7	765	471	294	78	44

== Heineken Cup ==
=== Pool 4 ===
Team	P	W	D	L	PF	PA	Diff	TF	TA	TB	LB	Pts
(Ireland) Ulster (6)	6	5	0	1	126	55	+71	12	5	2	1	23
(England) Northampton Saints	6	3	0	3	94	109	−15	9	11	1	2	15
(France) Castres	6	3	0	3	77	98	−21	6	6	0	2	14
(Scotland) Glasgow Warriors	6	1	0	5	70	105	−35	7	12	0	2	6

12 October 2012	(1 BP) Ulster (Ireland)	41–17	(France) Castres Olympique	Ravenhill, Belfast
20:00	Try: Trimble 8' c P. Marshall (2) 21' c, 42' m Pienaar 80' c Con: Jackson (3/4); Pen: Jackson (5/5) 7', 16', 36', 45', 60'; Cards: Court (yellow card) 57'	Report	Try: Andreu 32' c Garvey 51' c Con: Teulet (2/2); Pen: Teulet (1/1) 4'; Cards: Forestier (yellow card) 75'	Attendance: 11,451; Referee: Andrew Small (England)
Ulster lineup: 1. Tom Court, 2. Rory Best, 3. John Afoa, 4. Johann Muller (c), 5. Dan Tuohy, 6. Iain Henderson, 7. Chris Henry, 8. Mike McComish, 9. Paul Marshall, 10. Paddy Jackson, 11. Andrew Trimble, 12. Paddy Wallace, 13. Darren Cave, 14. Tommy Bowe, 15. Jared Payne.; Replacements: 16. Rob Herring (for Best 75'), 17. Callum Black (for McComish 63'), 18. Adam Macklin, 19. Lewis Stevenson (for Tuohy 63'), 20. Neil McComb, 21. Ruan Pienaar (for Marshall 63'), 22. Luke Marshall (for Wallace 72'), 23. Craig Gilroy (for Bowe 65').				Attendance: 11,451; Referee: Andrew Small (England)

19 October 2012	Glasgow Warriors (Scotland)	8–19	(Ireland) Ulster	Scotstoun Stadium, Glasgow
20:00	Try: Matawalu 77' m Pen: Horne (1/4) 20'	Report	Try: Henry 60' c Con: Jackson (1/1); Pen: Jackson (4/6) 23', 27', 63', 75'	Attendance: 6,194; Referee: Mathieu Raynal (France)
Ulster lineup: 1. Tom Court, 2. Rory Best, 3. John Afoa, 4. Johann Muller (c), 5. Dan Tuohy, 6. Iain Henderson, 7. Chris Henry, 8. Nick Williams, 9. Ruan Pienaar, 10. Paddy Jackson, 11. Andrew Trimble, 12. Paddy Wallace, 13. Darren Cave, 14. Tommy Bowe, 15. Jared Payne.; Replacements: 16. Rob Herring, 17. Callum Black (for Afoa 75'), 18. Adam Macklin, 19. Lewis Stevenson (for Tuohy 78'), 20. Mike McComish (for Henderson 78'), 21. Paul Marshall (for Jackson 78'), 22. Luke Marshall (for Cave 78'), 23. Craig Gilroy (for Trimble 79').				Attendance: 6,194; Referee: Mathieu Raynal (France)

7 December 2012	Northampton Saints (England)	6–25	(Ireland) Ulster (1 BP)	Franklin's Gardens, Northampton
20:00	Pen: Lamb (2/5) 20', 40'	Report	Try: Trimble 9' m Bowe 33' m Payne 44' c Tuohy 78' m Con: Jackson (1/4); Pen: Jackson (1/3) 23'; Cards: Henderson (yellow card) 71'	Attendance: 13,475; Referee: Jérôme Garcès (France)
Ulster lineup: 1. Tom Court, 2. Rory Best, 3. John Afoa, 4. Johann Muller (c), 5. Dan Tuohy, 6. Iain Henderson, 7. Chris Henry, 8. Roger Wilson, 9. Ruan Pienaar, 10. Paddy Jackson, 11. Andrew Trimble, 12. Paddy Wallace, 13. Darren Cave, 14. Tommy Bowe, 15. Jared Payne.; Replacements: 16. Nigel Brady, 17. Callum Black (for Court 69'), 18. Ricky Lutton, 19. Robbie Diack (for Wilson 79'), 20. Nick Williams (for Muller 50'), 21. Paul Marshall, 22. Luke Marshall (for Wallace 69'), 23. Craig Gilroy (for Trimble 69').				Attendance: 13,475; Referee: Jérôme Garcès (France)

15 December 2012	(1 BP) Ulster (Ireland)	9–10	(England) Northampton Saints	Ravenhill, Belfast
18:00	Pen: Jackson (3/4) 30', 38', 42'	Report	Try: van Velze 17' c Con: Myler (1/1); Pen: Myler (1/1) 6'	Attendance: 10,977; Referee: Nigel Owens (Wales)
Ulster lineup: 1. Tom Court, 2. Rory Best, 3. John Afoa, 4. Iain Henderson, 5. Dan Tuohy, 6. Nick Williams, 7. Chris Henry (c), 8. Roger Wilson, 9. Ruan Pienaar, 10. Paddy Jackson, 11. Andrew Trimble, 12. Paddy Wallace, 13. Darren Cave, 14. Tommy Bowe, 15. Jared Payne.; Replacements: 16. Nigel Brady, 17. Callum Black (for Court 70'), 18. Ricky Lutton (for Tuohy 80'), 19. Neil McComb (for Bowe 78'), 20. Robbie Diack (for Williams 75'), 21. Paul Marshall (for Wallace 70'), 22. Luke Marshall (for Jackson 63'), 23. Craig Gilroy (for Trimble 58').				Attendance: 10,977; Referee: Nigel Owens (Wales)

11 January 2013	Ulster (Ireland)	23–6	(Scotland) Glasgow Warriors	Ravenhill, Belfast
20:00	Try: Williams 19' c Payne 73' m Cave 78' m Con: Pienaar (1/3); Pen: Pienaar (2/4) 6', 62'; Cards: Henderson (yellow card) 52'	Report	Pen: Weir (2/4) 48', 55'	Attendance: 10,940; Referee: Pascal Gaüzère (France)
Ulster lineup: 1. Tom Court, 2. Rory Best, 3. John Afoa, 4. Lewis Stevenson, 5. Iain Henderson, 6. Robbie Diack, 7. Chris Henry (c), 8. Nick Williams, 9. Ruan Pienaar, 10. Paddy Jackson, 11. Craig Gilroy, 12. Paddy Wallace, 13. Darren Cave, 14. Andrew Trimble, 15. Jared Payne.; Replacements: 16. Rob Herring (for Best 77'), 17. Callum Black (for Court 77'), 18. Declan Fitzpatrick (for Afoa 77'), 19. Neil McComb, 20. Roger Wilson (for Diack 60'), 21. Paul Marshall (for Jackson 60'), 22. Michael Allen (for Gilroy 77'), 23. Chris Cochrane.				Attendance: 10,940; Referee: Pascal Gaüzère (France)

19 January 2013	(1 BP) Castres Olympique (France)	8–9	(Ireland) Ulster	Stade Pierre-Antoine, Castres
14:35	Try: Lamerat 8' m Pen: Kockott (1/2) 18'	Report	Pen: Pienaar (3/5) 11', 35', 63'	Attendance: 7,632; Referee: Nigel Owens (Wales)
Ulster lineup: 1. Tom Court, 2. Rory Best, 3. John Afoa, 4. Lewis Stevenson, 5. Neil McComb, 6. Robbie Diack, 7. Chris Henry (c), 8. Roger Wilson, 9. Paul Marshall, 10. Ruan Pienaar, 11. Michael Allen, 12. Paddy Wallace, 13. Darren Cave, 14. Andrew Trimble, 15. Craig Gilroy.; Replacements: 16. Rob Herring, 17. Callum Black, 18. Declan Fitzpatrick, 19. Iain Henderson (for Wilson 28'), 20. Mike McComish, 21. Michael Heaney, 22. Paddy Jackson (for P. Marshall 55'), 23. Chris Cochrane.				Attendance: 7,632; Referee: Nigel Owens (Wales)

=== Quarter–final ===
6 April 2013	Saracens (England)	27–16	(Ireland) Ulster	Twickenham, London
18:30	Try: Fraser 32' c Ashton 62' m Con: Farrell (1/2); Pen: Farrell (5/5) 1', 28', 36', 49', 59'	Report; Highlights	Try: Henderson 78' c Con: Pienaar (1/1); Pen: Pienaar (3/5) 26', 30', 56'	Attendance: 37,888; Referee: Romain Poite (FFR)
Ulster lineup: 1. Tom Court, 2. Rory Best, 3. John Afoa, 4. Johann Muller (c), 5. Dan Tuohy, 6. Iain Henderson, 7. Chris Henry (c), 8. Nick Williams, 9. Ruan Pienaar, 10. Paddy Jackson, 11. Craig Gilroy, 12. Luke Marshall, 13. Darren Cave, 14. Andrew Trimble, 15. Jared Payne.; Replacements: 16. Rob Herring, 17. Callum Black, 18. Ricky Lutton, 19. Robbie Diack (for Muller 64'), 20. Mike McComish, 21. Paul Marshall, 22. Stuart Olding (for L. Marshall 68'), 23. Tommy Bowe (for Cave 58').				Attendance: 37,888; Referee: Romain Poite (FFR)

== Pro12 ==
Pro12 table
	Club	Played	Won	Drawn	Lost	Points For	Points Against	Points Difference	Tries For	Tries Against	Try Bonus	Losing Bonus	Points
1	(Ireland) Ulster (RU)	22	17	1	4	577	348	+229	62	33	8	3	81
2	(Ireland) Leinster (CH)	22	17	0	5	585	386	+199	63	46	9	1	78
3	(Scotland) Glasgow Warriors (SF)	22	16	0	6	541	324	+217	66	30	9	3	76
4	(Wales) Scarlets (SF)	22	15	0	7	436	406	+30	41	37	3	3	66
5	(Wales) Ospreys	22	14	1	7	471	342	+129	48	25	2	2	62
6	(Ireland) Munster	22	11	1	10	442	389	+53	46	34	4	4	54
7	(Italy) Benetton Treviso	22	10	2	10	414	450	–36	45	44	4	2	50
8	(Ireland) Connacht	22	8	1	13	358	422	–64	32	43	1	3	38
9	(Wales) Cardiff Blues	22	8	0	14	348	487	–139	28	51	1	5	38
10	(Scotland) Edinburgh	22	7	0	15	399	504	–105	35	51	1	7	36
11	(Wales) Newport Gwent Dragons	22	6	0	16	358	589	–231	31	72	1	3	28
12	(Italy) Zebre	22	0	0	22	291	573	–282	29	60	1	9	10
If teams are level at any stage, tiebreakers are applied in the following order: 1. number of matches won; 2. the difference between points for and points against; 3. the number of tries scored; 4. the most points scored; 5. the difference between tries for and tries against; 6. the fewest red cards received; 7. the fewest yellow cards received.
Green background (rows 1 to 4) are play-off places. Qualification for the Heineken Cup is based on each country's allocation, i.e. three highest–ranked Irish teams, three highest–ranked Welsh teams, both Italian teams and both Scottish teams. Leinster won the Amlin Challenge Cup, giving Ireland an extra Heineken Cup place that passed to Connacht. Updated 17 May 2013. Source: RaboDirect PRO12

31 August 2012	Ulster (Ireland)	18–10	(Scotland) Glasgow Warriors	Ravenhill, Belfast
19:05	Try: Allen 38' m Gilroy 45' c Con: O'Connor (1/2); Pen: O'Connor (2/5) 11', 80'	Report	Try: Seymour 68' c Con: Jackson (1/1); Pen: Weir (1/1) 21'; Cards: Seymour (yellow card)	Attendance: 8,108; Referee: Marius Mitrea (FIR)
Ulster lineup: 1. Callum Black, 2. Rob Herring, 3. John Afoa, 4. Johann Muller (c), 5. Lewis Stevenson, 6. Robbie Diack, 7. Sean Doyle, 8. Nick Williams, 9. Michael Heaney, 10. Paddy Jackson, 11. Craig Gilroy, 12. Luke Marshall, 13. Chris Farrell, 14. Michael Allen, 15. Jared Payne.; Replacements: 16. Nigel Brady, 17. Tom Court (for Black 61'), 18. Declan Fitzpatrick, 19. Neil McComb, 20. Mike McComish (for Williams 54'), 21. Paul Marshall (for Heaney 59'), 22. Niall O'Connor (for Jackson 9'), 23. Darren Cave (for Farrell 64').				Attendance: 8,108; Referee: Marius Mitrea (FIR)

8 September 2012	(1 BP) Ospreys (Wales)	13–16	(Ireland) Ulster	Liberty Stadium, Swansea
18:30	Try: Dirksen 24' c Con: Morgan (1/1); Pen: Morgan (2/3) 47', 53'	Report	Try: P. Marshall 75' c Con: Jackson (1/1); Pen: O'Connor (1/4) 32'; Jackson (2/2) 56', 68'	Attendance: 8,566; Referee: John Lacey (IRFU)
Ulster lineup: 1. Callum Black, 2. Rob Herring, 3. Declan Fitzpatrick, 4. Johann Muller (c), 5. Lewis Stevenson, 6. Mike McComish, 7. Sean Doyle, 8. Nick Williams, 9. Michael Heaney, 10. Niall O'Connor, 11. Craig Gilroy, 12. Luke Marshall, 13. Chris Farrell, 14. Michael Allen, 15. Jared Payne.; Replacements: 16. Nigel Brady (for Herring 49'), 17. Tom Court (for Black 41'), 18. John Afoa (for Fitzpatrick 49'), 19. Neil McComb (for Stevenson 66'), 20. Stephen Ferris (for Doyle 55'), 21. Paul Marshall (for Heaney 41'), 22. Paddy Jackson (for O'Connor 55'), 23. Andrew Trimble.				Attendance: 8,566; Referee: John Lacey (IRFU)

14 September 2012	Ulster (Ireland)	20–19	(Ireland) Munster (1 BP)	Ravenhill, Belfast
19:05	Try: Payne 51' m Pen: Jackson (5/6) 16', 36', 40', 44', 69'	Report	Try: Earls 38' c Con: Keatley (1/1); Pen: Keatley (2/2) 3', 8'; Drop: Keatley (2/2) 13', 67'; Cards: Dougall (yellow card)	Attendance: 10,397; Referee: Alain Rolland (IRFU)
Ulster lineup: 1. Tom Court, 2. Nigel Brady, 3. John Afoa, 4. Johann Muller (c), 5. Lewis Stevenson, 6. Stephen Ferris, 7. Sean Doyle, 8. Nick Williams, 9. Paul Marshall, 10. Paddy Jackson, 11. Michael Allen, 12. Luke Marshall, 13. Darren Cave, 14. Andrew Trimble, 15. Jared Payne.; Replacements: 16. Rob Herring (for Brady 61'), 17. Callum Black, 18. Adam Macklin, 19. Neil McComb (for Stevenson 68'), 20. Mike McComish (for Doyle 68'), 21. Michael Heaney, 22. Peter Nelson, 23. Craig Gilroy (for Cave 54').				Attendance: 10,397; Referee: Alain Rolland (IRFU)

28 September 2012	Cardiff Blues (Wales)	19–48	(Ireland) Ulster (1 BP)	Cardiff Arms Park
19:05	Try: Robinson 61' c Con: G. Davies (1/1); Pen: Tovey (3/3) 2', 9', 19'; G. Davies (1/1) 47'	Report	Try: Allen 18' c Williams (2) 29' c, 66' c Bowe (2) 48' m, 55' m Payne 53' c Trimble 77' c Con: Jackson (5/7); Pen: Jackson (1/3) 13'	Attendance: 8,217; Referee: Marius Mitrea (FIR)
Ulster lineup: 1. Tom Court, 2. Nigel Brady, 3. John Afoa, 4. Neil McComb, 5. Dan Tuohy, 6. Iain Henderson, 7. Chris Henry, 8. Nick Williams, 9. Paul Marshall, 10. Paddy Jackson, 11. Andrew Trimble, 12. Darren Cave, 13. Michael Allen, 14. Tommy Bowe, 15. Jared Payne.; Replacements: 16. Rob Herring, 17. Callum Black (for Court 66'), 18. Adam Macklin (for Afoa 74'), 19. Lewis Stevenson (for McComb 66'), 20. Mike McComish (for Henderson 60'), 21. Michael Heaney (for Brady 66'), 22. Paddy Wallace (for Allen 18'), 23. Craig Gilroy (for Bowe 60').				Attendance: 8,217; Referee: Marius Mitrea (FIR)

5 October 2012	Ulster (Ireland)	25–0	(Ireland) Connacht	Ravenhill, Belfast
19:05	Try: penalty try 34' c Williams 40' c L. Marshall 78' m Con: Jackson (2/2); Pen: Jackson (2/2) 11', 60'	Report	Cards: Gannon (yellow card)	Attendance: 10,052; Referee: George Clancy (IRFU)
Ulster lineup: 1. Tom Court, 2. Rory Best, 3. John Afoa, 4. Johann Muller (c), 5. Dan Tuohy, 6. Stephen Ferris, 7. Chris Henry, 8. Nick Williams, 9. Paul Marshall, 10. Paddy Jackson, 11. Andrew Trimble, 12. Paddy Wallace, 13. Darren Cave, 14. Tommy Bowe, 15. Jared Payne.; Replacements: 16. Rob Herring (for Best 59'), 17. Callum Black (for Court 69'), 18. Adam Macklin (for Williams 75'), 19. Lewis Stevenson (for Muller 67'), 20. Mike McComish (for Ferris 67'), 21. Michael Heaney (for P. Marshall 72'), 22. Luke Marshall (for Jackson 69'), 23. Craig Gilroy (for Trimble 67').				Attendance: 10,052; Referee: George Clancy (IRFU)

26 October 2012	Newport Gwent Dragons (Wales)	19–46	(Ireland) Ulster (1 BP)	Rodney Parade, Newport
19:05	Try: Tuilagi 29' c Con: Prydie (1/1); Pen: Prydie (4/5) 2', 10', 35', 52'	Report	Try: Court 16' c Williams 32' c Pienaar 37' m Cave 60' c Trimble 61' c Payne 78' c Con: Pienaar (5/6); Pen: Pienaar (2/4) 42', 49'	Attendance: 5,057; Referee: Peter Fitzgibbon (IRFU)
Ulster lineup: 1. Tom Court, 2. Rory Best, 3. Declan Fitzpatrick, 4. Lewis Stevenson, 5. Dan Tuohy, 6. Iain Henderson, 7. Chris Henry, 8. Nick Williams, 9. Paul Marshall, 10. Ruan Pienaar, 11. Craig Gilroy, 12. Paddy Wallace, 13. Darren Cave, 14. Andrew Trimble, 15. Tommy Bowe.; Replacements: 16. Nigel Brady, 17. Callum Black, 18. John Afoa', 19. Mike McComish (for Tuohy 64'), 20. Roger Wilson (for Williams 56'); 21. Paddy Jackson (for P. Marshall 66'), 22. Luke Marshall (for Wallace 56'), 23. Jared Payne (for Cave 66').				Attendance: 5,057; Referee: Peter Fitzgibbon (IRFU)

2 November 2012	(1 BP) Ulster (Ireland)	45–20	(Scotland) Edinburgh	Ravenhill, Belfast
19:05	Try: penalty try 29' c Payne (2) 31' c, 66' c Pienaar 35' c Wilson 57' c Gilroy 80' c Con: Pienaar (6/6); Pen: O'Connor (1/1) 15'	Report	Try: Brown (2) 11' c, 37' c Con: Hunter (2/2); Pen: Hunter (2/2) 20', 42'	Attendance: 11,078; Referee: Nigel Owens (WRU)
Ulster lineup: 1. Callum Black, 2. Nigel Brady, 3. John Afoa, 4. Lewis Stevenson, 5. Neil McComb, 6. Stephen Ferris, 7. Mike McComish, 8. Roger Wilson, 9. Paul Marshall, 10. Ruan Pienaar, 11. Craig Gilroy, 12. Paddy Wallace, 13. Jared Payne, 14. Chris Cochrane, 15. Ricky Andrew.; Replacements: 16. Niall Annett (for Brady 69'), 17. Ricky Lutton (for Black 74'), 18. Adam Macklin (for Afoa 70'), 19. Robbie Diack, 20. Nick Williams (for Ferris 46'); 21. Niall O'Connor (for P. Marshall 65'), 22. Peter Nelson (for Andrew 69'), 23. Stuart Olding (for Wallace 65').				Attendance: 11,078; Referee: Nigel Owens (WRU)

18 November 2012	(2 BP) Zebre (Italy)	25–27	(Ireland) Ulster	Stadio XXV Aprile, Parma
15:00	Try: Tebaldi 11' m Halangahu 44' m van Schalkwyk (2) 54' m, 65' c Con: Halangahu (1/4); Pen: Halangahu (1/2) 40'; Cards: Sarto (yellow card)	Report	Try: Wallace 58' m penalty try 75' c Con: O'Connor (1/2); Pen: O'Connor (5/5) 10', 27', 34', 48', 63'	Attendance: 2,550; Referee: Neil Paterson (SRU)
Ulster lineup: 1. Callum Black, 2. Nigel Brady, 3. John Afoa, 4. Robbie Diack, 5. Neil McComb, 6. Nick Williams, 7. Mike McComish, 8. Roger Wilson, 9. Michael Heaney, 10. Niall O'Connor, 11. Chris Cochrane, 12. Paddy Wallace, 13. Jared Payne, 14. Michael Allen, 15. Ricky Andrew.; Replacements: 16. Rob Herring (for Brady 52'), 17. Tom Court (for Black 55'), 18. Declan Fitzpatrick, 19. James Simpson, 20. Ali Birch, 21. Blane McIlroy, 22. Peter Nelson, 23. Stuart Olding.				Attendance: 2,550; Referee: Neil Paterson (SRU)

23 November 2012	(1 BP) Benetton Treviso (Italy)	15–16	(Ireland) Ulster	Stadio Comunale di Monigo, Treviso
19:05	Try: Williams 8' c Nitoglia 40' m Con: Di Bernardo (1/2); Pen: Di Bernardo (1/3) 28'	Report	Try: Nelson 24' c Con: O'Connor (1/1); Pen: O'Connor (3/4) 20', 49', 58'	Attendance: 3,500; Referee: Peter Allan (SRU)
Ulster lineup: 1. Tom Court, 2. Rob Herring, 3. Declan Fitzpatrick, 4. Robbie Diack, 5. Neil McComb, 6. Nick Williams, 7. Mike McComish, 8. Roger Wilson, 9. Paul Marshall, 10. Niall O'Connor, 11. Michael Allen, 12. Paddy Wallace, 13. Jared Payne, 14. Andrew Trimble, 15. Peter Nelson.; Replacements: 16. Nigel Brady (for Herring 67'), 17. Callum Black (for Court 63'), 18. John Afoa (for Fitzpatrick 41'), 19. James Simpson, 20. Ali Birch, 21. Michael Heaney, 22. Stuart Olding, 23. Chris Cochrane.				Attendance: 3,500; Referee: Peter Allan (SRU)

2 December 2012	(1 BP) Scarlets (Wales)	12–19	(Ireland) Ulster	Parc y Scarlets, Llanelli
16:00	Pen: Thomas (4/7) 20', 49', 52', 80'	Report	Try: Trimble 28' c Con: Jackson (1/1); Pen: Jackson (4/5) 9', 33', 43', 58'; Cards: Tuohy (yellow card)	Attendance: 7,089; Referee: Peter Fitzgibbon (IRFU)
Ulster lineup: 1. Callum Black, 2. Rob Herring, 3. John Afoa, 4. Johann Muller(c), 5. Neil McComb, 6. Iain Henderson, 7. Robbie Diack, 8. Roger Wilson, 9. Paul Marshall, 10. Paddy Jackson, 11. Craig Gilroy, 12. Luke Marshall, 13. Darren Cave, 14. Andrew Trimble, 15. Peter Nelson.; Replacements: 16. Rory Best (for Herring 57'), 17. Tom Court (for Black 57'), 18. Ricky Lutton, 19. Dan Tuohy (for Muller), 20. Mike McComish (for McComb 61'), 21. Michael Heaney, 22. Niall O'Connor, 23. Tommy Bowe (for Gilroy 41').				Attendance: 7,089; Referee: Peter Fitzgibbon (IRFU)

21 December 2012	Ulster (Ireland)	27–19	(Ireland) Leinster	Ravenhill, Belfast
19:05	Try: Penalty try 37' c Williams 44' c Trimble 75' c Con: Pienaar (3/3); Pen: Jackson (1/3) 26'; Pienaar (1/2) 30'; Cards: Best (yellow card) 70'	Report	Try: McFadden 78' c Con: Madigan (1/1); Pen: Madigan (4/5) 12', 19', 34', 43'	Attendance: 10,940; Referee: George Clancy (IRFU)
Ulster lineup: 1. Tom Court, 2. Rory Best, 3. John Afoa, 4. Iain Henderson, 5. Neil McComb, 6. Robbie Diack, 7. Chris Henry, 8. Nick Williams, 9. Ruan Pienaar, 10. Paddy Jackson, 11. Craig Gilroy, 12. Luke Marshall, 13. Darren Cave, 14. Andrew Trimble, 15. Jared Payne.; Replacements: 16. Rob Herring (for Diack 72'), 17. Callum Black (for Court 79'), 18. Adam Macklin, 19. Alan O'Connor (for Henderson 79'), 20. Roger Wilson (for Williams 69'), 21. Paul Marshall (for Jackson 66'), 22. Paddy Wallace, 23. Adam D'Arcy (for Cave 59').				Attendance: 10,940; Referee: George Clancy (IRFU)

29 December 2012	Munster (Ireland)	24–10	(Ireland) Ulster	Thomond Park, Limerick
17:30	Try: penalty try 33' c Zebo 45' c P. O'Mahony 50' c Con: Keatley (3/3); Pen: Keatley (1/1) 3'	Report	Try: Birch 80' c Con: Olding (1/1); Pen: O'Connor (1/2) 22'; Cards: P. Marshall (yellow card) 35'	Attendance: 23,587; Referee: Alain Rolland (IRFU)
Ulster lineup': 1. Callum Black, 2. Rob Herring, 3. Adam Macklin, 4. Lewis Stevenson, 5. Neil McComb, 6. Robbie Diack, 7. Mike McComish, 8. Roger Wilson, 9. Paul Marshall, 10. Niall O'Connor, 11. Craig Gilroy, 12. Luke Marshall, 13. Michael Allen, 14. Chris Cochrane, 15. Adam D'Arcy.; Replacements: 16. Niall Annett (for Herring 58'), 17. Tom Court (for Black 58'), 18. Ricky Lutton (for Macklin 65'), 19. Alan O'Connor, 20. Ali Birch (for McComish 58'), 21. Michael Heaney (for Marshall 67'), 22. Stuart Olding (for O'Connor 60'), 23. Ricky Andrew (for Gilroy 70').				Attendance: 23,587; Referee: Alain Rolland (IRFU)

4 January 2013	(1 BP) Ulster (Ireland)	47–17	(Wales) Scarlets	Ravenhill, Belfast
19:05	Try: Diack 44' c Williams 56' c Trimble 73' c penalty try 76' c McComb 77' c Con: Pienaar (2/2); Jackson (3/3); Pen: Pienaar (4/4) 23', 34', 38', 48'	Report	Try: Turnbull 67' c S. Williams 80' c Con: Thomas (1/1); S. Williams (1/1); Pen: Thomas (1/2) 9'; Cards: Thomas (yellow card)	Attendance: 10,977; Referee: Leighton Hodges (WRU)
Ulster lineup: 1. Tom Court, 2. Rob Herring, 3. Adam Macklin, 4. Lewis Stevenson, 5. Dan Tuohy, 6. Robbie Diack, 7. Chris Henry, 8. Nick Williams, 9. Ruan Pienaar, 10. Paddy Jackson, 11. Craig Gilroy, 12. Luke Marshall, 13. Darren Cave, 14. Andrew Trimble, 15. Adam D'Arcy.; Replacements: 16. Niall Annett (for Herring 72'), 17. Callum Black (for Court 72'), 18. John Afoa (for Macklin 41'), 19. Neil McComb (for Tuohy 36'), 20. Roger Wilson (for Williams 58'), 21. Michael Heaney (for Pienaar 69'), 22. Paddy Wallace (for L. Marshall 41'), 23. Ricky Andrew (for D'Arcy 14').				Attendance: 10,977; Referee: Leighton Hodges (WRU)

8 February 2013	(1 BP) Ulster (Ireland)	12–16	(Wales) Ospreys	Ravenhill, Belfast
19:05	Pen: Pienaar (3/3) 5', 15', 33'; Olding (1/1) 65'	Report	Try: Bevington 67' c Con: Morgan (1/1); Pen: Morgan (3/3) 10', 22', 54'; Cards: Allen (yellow card)	Attendance: 10,886; Referee: Marius Mitrea (FIR)
Ulster lineup: 1. Callum Black, 2. Rob Herring, 3. Tom Court, 4. Johann Muller (c), 5. Lewis Stevenson, 6. Mike McComish, 7. Ali Birch, 8. Robbie Diack, 9. Ruan Pienaar, 10. Stuart Olding, 11. Michael Allen, 12. Paddy Wallace, 13. Luke Marshall, 14. Andrew Trimble, 15. Ricky Andrew.; Replacements: 16. Niall Annett (for Herring 58'), 17. Andrew Warwick, 18. Ricky Lutton, 19. Dan Tuohy (for Muller 58'), 20. Neil McComb, 21. Paul Marshall (for Pienaar 58'), 22. Darren Cave (for Wallace 44'), 23. Chris Cochrane (for Allen 76').				Attendance: 10,886; Referee: Marius Mitrea (FIR)

15 February 2013	(1 BP) Ulster (Ireland)	26–3	(Italy) Zebre	Ravenhill, Belfast
19:05	Try: Herring 8' c Diack (2) 40' m, 57' c Andrew 73' c Con: Pienaar (3/4)	Report	Pen: Halangahu (1/2) 34'	Attendance: 10,309; Referee: Neil Paterson (SRU)
Ulster lineup: 1. Tom Court, 2. Rob Herring, 3. Declan Fitzpatrick, 4. Johann Muller (c), 5. Lewis Stevenson, 6. Iain Henderson, 7. Chris Henry, 8. Robbie Diack, 9. Ruan Pienaar, 10. Paddy Jackson, 11. Chris Cochrane, 12. Luke Marshall, 13. Darren Cave, 14. Andrew Trimble, 15. Ricky Andrew.; Replacements: 16. Niall Annett (for Herring 66'), 17. Callum Black (for Stevenson 69'), 18. John Afoa (for Fitzpatrick), 19. Neil McComb (for Court 66'), 20. Mike McComish (for Henderson 11'), 21. Michael Heaney, 22. Stuart Olding (for L. Marshall 38'), 23. Neil Walsh (for Cochrane 59').				Attendance: 10,309; Referee: Neil Paterson (SRU)

22 February 2013	(1 BP) Glasgow Warriors (Scotland)	20–14	(Ireland) Ulster (1 BP)	Scotstoun, Glasgow
19:35	Try: Swinson 15' m Seymour 28' m Murchie 41' m Matawalu 73' m	Report	Try: Olding 67' m Pen: Pienaar (3/5) 6', 18', 49'	Attendance: 5,613; Referee: Nigel Owens (WRU)
Ulster lineup: 1. Callum Black, 2. Nigel Brady, 3. John Afoa, 4. Neil McComb, 5. Dan Tuohy, 6. Conor Joyce, 7. Ali Birch, 8. Robbie Diack, 9. Ruan Pienaar, 10. Paddy Wallace, 11. Neil Walsh, 12. Stuart Olding, 13. Andrew Trimble, 14. Michael Allen, 15. Ricky Andrew.; Replacements: 16. Rob Herring (for Brady 49'), 17. Andrew Warwick, 18. Ricky Lutton, 19. Alan O'Connor, 20. Mike McComish (for Birch 49'), 21. Paul Marshall (for Wallace 51'), 22. Darren Cave, 23. Chris Cochrane.				Attendance: 5,613; Referee: Nigel Owens (WRU)

1 March 2013	Ulster (Ireland)	29–29	(Italy) Benetton Treviso (1 BP)	Ravenhill, Belfast
19:05	Try: Trimble 19' c Olding 33' c Con: Jackson (2/2); Pen: Jackson (5/7) 28', 47', 56', 70', 78'; Cards: Stevenson (yellow card); Henderson (yellow card) 35'	Report	Try: Budd (3) 40' c, 64' c, 79' m Barbieri 51' c Con: Di Bernardo (3/4); Pen: Di Bernardo (1/1) 4'	Attendance: 10,678; Referee: Andrew McMenemy (SRU)
Ulster lineup: 1. John Afoa, 2. Rob Herring, 3. Declan Fitzpatrick, 4. Lewis Stevenson, 5. Dan Tuohy, 6. Iain Henderson, 7. Mike McComish, 8. Robbie Diack, 9. Ruan Pienaar, 10. Paddy Jackson, 11. Michael Allen, 12. Stuart Olding, 13. Darren Cave, 14. Andrew Trimble, 15. Ricky Andrew.; Replacements: 16. Nigel Brady, 17. Callum Black, 18. Ricky Lutton, 19. Neil McComb (for Tuohy 72'), 20. Ali Birch, 21. Paul Marshall (for Andrew 67'), 22. Niall O'Connor (for Pienaar 72'), 23. Chris Cochrane (for Cave 25').				Attendance: 10,678; Referee: Andrew McMenemy (SRU)

22 March 2013	Edinburgh (Scotland)	14–8	(Ireland) Ulster (1 BP)	Murrayfield, Edinburgh
19:30	Try: McInally 56' m Pen: Francis (3/3) 16', 31', 74'	Report	Try: Trimble 65' m Pen: Jackson (1/4) 40'	Attendance: 4,714; Referee: Leighton Hodges (WRU)
Ulster lineup: 1. Tom Court, 2. Rob Herring, 3. John Afoa, 4. Johann Muller (c), 5. Lewis Stevenson, 6. Dan Tuohy, 7. Mike McComish, 8. Robbie Diack, 9. Paul Marshall, 10. Paddy Jackson, 11. Michael Allen, 12. Stuart Olding, 13. Darren Cave, 14. Andrew Trimble, 15. Jared Payne.; Replacements: 16. Niall Annett, 17. Callum Black, 18. Ricky Lutton, 19. Nick Williams (for Muller 41'), 20. Ali Birch, 21. Michael Heaney (for P. Marshall 60'), 22. Ricky Andrew, 23. Peter Nelson (for Olding 55').				Attendance: 4,714; Referee: Leighton Hodges (WRU)

30 March 2013	(1 BP) Leinster (Ireland)	18–22	(Ireland) Ulster	RDS Arena, Dublin
18:15	Pen: Madigan (6/6) 15', 19', 26', 40', 48', 69'	Report	Try: Diack 22' m Henderson 62' m Pen: Pienaar (4/4) 39', 51', 57', 71'; Cards: Payne (yellow card)	Attendance: 18,500; Referee: George Clancy (IRFU)
1. Tom Court, 2. Rory Best, 3. Ricky Lutton, 4. Johann Muller, 5. Dan Tuohy, 6. Robbie Diack, 7. Chris Henry, 8. Nick Williams, 9. Ruan Pienaar, 10. Paddy Jackson, 11. Craig Gilroy, 12. Stuart Olding, 13. Darren Cave, 14. Andrew Trimble, 15. Jared Payne.; Replacements: 16. Rob Herring, 17. Callum Black (for Court 71'), 18. Kyle McCall (for Lutton 69'), 19. Lewis Stevenson, 20. Iain Henderson (for Williams 57'), 21. Roger Wilson (for Henry 63'), 22. Paul Marshall, 23. Peter Nelson (for Trimble 72').				Attendance: 18,500; Referee: George Clancy (IRFU)

12 April 2013	(1 BP) Ulster (Ireland)	31–5	(Wales) Newport Gwent Dragons	Ravenhill, Belfast
19:05	Try: Bowe 24' c Olding 35' c Cave 38' c P. Marshall 45' c Con: Pienaar (4/4); Pen: Pienaar (1/1) 29'	Report	Try: Prydie 70' m Cards: D. Evans (yellow card)	Attendance: 9,647; Referee: Leighton Hodges (WRU)
Ulster lineup: 1. Tom Court, 2. Rory Best, 3. Ricky Lutton, 4. Iain Henderson, 5. Dan Tuohy, 6. Robbie Diack, 7. Mike McComish, 8. Nick Williams, 9. Paul Marshall, 10. Ruan Pienaar, 11. Craig Gilroy, 12. Stuart Olding, 13. Darren Cave, 14. Tommy Bowe, 15. Peter Nelson.; Replacements: 16. Rob Herring (for Best 67'), 17. Callum Black (for Court 51'), 18. Declan Fitzpatrick (for Lutton 58'), 19. Lewis Stevenson (for Henderson 44'), 20. Ali Birch (for Diack 67'), 21. Niall O'Connor, 22. Michael Allen (for Olding 53'), 23. Adam D'Arcy (for Bowe 64').				Attendance: 9,647; Referee: Leighton Hodges (WRU)

19 April 2013	Connacht (Ireland)	18–34	(Ireland) Ulster (1 BP)	The Sportsground, Galway
19:45	Try: Naoupu 3' m Vainikolo 17' c Con: Parks (1/2); Pen: Parks (1/1) 24'; Nikora (1/1) 49'	Report	Try: Olding 9' c Trimble 11' m Best 32' c Bowe 71' c Payne 74' m Con: Pienaar (3/5); Pen: Pienaar (1/3) 29'	Attendance: 6,463; Referee: Peter Fitzgibbon (IRFU)
1. Tom Court, 2. Rory Best, 3. Ricky Lutton, 4. Lewis Stevenson, 5. Dan Tuohy, 6. Robbie Diack, 7. Chris Henry, 8. Nick Williams, 9. Ruan Pienaar, 10. Paddy Jackson, 11. Tommy Bowe, 12. Stuart Olding, 13. Darren Cave, 14. Andrew Trimble, 15. Jared Payne.; Replacements: 16. Rob Herring, 17. Callum Black, 18. John Afoa (for Lutton 47'), 19. Johann Muller (for Stevenson 44'), 20. Iain Henderson (for Williams 60'), 21. Paul Marshall (for Pienaar 75'), 22. Michael Allen (for Cave 77'), 23. Peter Nelson (for Payne 75').				Attendance: 6,463; Referee: Peter Fitzgibbon (IRFU)

3 May 2013	(1 BP) Ulster (Ireland)	37–13	(Wales) Cardiff Blues	Ravenhill, Belfast
19:45	Try: Pienaar 9' c Trimble (2) 43' c, 54' c Diack 78' c Con: Pienaar (4/4); Pen: Pienaar (3/4) 26', 46', 50'	Report	Try: Hewitt 4' c Con: Patchell (1/1); Pen: Patchell (1/2) 21'; Drop: Patchell (1/1) 28'; Cards: Hewitt (yellow card)	Attendance: 10,700; Referee: Neil Paterson (SRU)
Ulster lineup: 1. Callum Black, 2. Rory Best, 3. John Afoa, 4. Johann Muller, 5. Iain Henderson, 6. Robbie Diack, 7. Chris Henry, 8. Nick Williams, 9. Paul Marshall, 10. Ruan Pienaar, 11. Tommy Bowe, 12. Stuart Olding, 13. Darren Cave, 14. Andrew Trimble, 15. Jared Payne.; Replacements: 16. Nigel Brady (for Best 52'), 17. Tom Court (for Black 61'), 18. Declan Fitzpatrick (for Afoa 22'), 19. Dan Tuohy (for Muller 61'), 20. Sean Doyle (for Henderson 67'), 21. Paddy Jackson (for P. Marshall 51'), 22. Michael Allen (for Cave 69'), 23. Peter Nelson (for Bowe 69').				Attendance: 10,700; Referee: Neil Paterson (SRU)

=== Semi-final ===
10 May 2013	Ulster (Ireland)	28–17	(Wales) Scarlets	Ravenhill, Belfast
19:45	Try: Bowe 25' c Diack 34' m Court 43' c Con: Pienaar (2/3); Pen: Pienaar (3/4) 7', 40', 63'; Cards: Trimble (yellow card) 21'	Report	Try: G. Davies 61' c Timani 79' c Con: O. Williams (2/2); Pen: O. Williams (1/2) 5'; Cards: Williams (yellow card)	Attendance: 10,700; Referee: Alain Rolland (IRFU)
Ulster lineup: 1. Tom Court, 2. Rory Best, 3. Declan Fitzpatrick, 4. Johann Muller (c), 5. Dan Tuohy, 6. Robbie Diack, 7. Chris Henry, 8. Nick Williams, 9. Ruan Pienaar, 10. Paddy Jackson, 11. Tommy Bowe, 12. Stuart Olding, 13. Darren Cave, 14. Andrew Trimble, 15. Jared Payne.; Replacements: 16. Rob Herring (for Best 73'), 17. Callum Black, 18. Ricky Lutton (for Fitzpatrick 56'), 19. Iain Henderson (for Tuohy 67'), 20. Mike McComish (for Williams 68'), 21. Paul Marshall (for Jackson 59'), 22. Michael Allen (for Trimble 75'), 23. Peter Nelson (for Olding 67').				Attendance: 10,700; Referee: Alain Rolland (IRFU)

=== Final ===
The final was contested on Saturday, 25 May 2013, between the winners of the two semi-finals.

25 May 2013	Ulster (Ireland)	18–24	(Ireland) Leinster	RDS Arena, Dublin
16:45	Pen: Pienaar (6/6) 24', 36', 47', 51', 56', 69'	Report	Try: Jennings 3' c Heaslip 63' m Con: J. Sexton (1/2); Pen: J. Sexton (4/5) 8', 34', 40', 45'	Attendance: 19,200; Referee: John Lacey (Ireland)

FB	15	(New Zealand) Jared Payne
RW	14	(Ireland) Andrew Trimble
OC	13	(Ireland) Darren Cave
IC	12	(Ireland) Stuart Olding		(substituted off) 64'
LW	11	(Ireland) Tommy Bowe
FH	10	(Ireland) Paddy Jackson
SH	9	(South Africa) Ruan Pienaar
N8	8	(New Zealand) Nick Williams
OF	7	(Ireland) Chris Henry
BF	6	(South Africa) Robbie Diack	(yellow card) 44' to 54'	(substituted off) 64'
RL	5	(Ireland) Dan Tuohy
LL	4	(South Africa) Johann Muller (c)
TP	3	(New Zealand) John Afoa
HK	2	(Ireland) Rory Best
LP	1	(Ireland) Tom Court		(substituted off) 73'
Replacements:
HK	16	(Ireland) Rob Herring
PR	17	(Ireland) Callum Black		(substituted on) 73'
PR	18	(Ireland) Declan Fitzpatrick
LK	19	(Ireland) Iain Henderson		(substituted on) 64'
FL	20	(Ireland) Mike McComish
SH	21	(Ireland) Paul Marshall
CE	22	(Ireland) Mike Allen		(substituted on) 64'
FB	23	(Ireland) Peter Nelson
Coach:
(New Zealand) Mark Anscombe

FB	15	(Fiji) Isa Nacewa	(yellow card) 47' to 57'
RW	14	(Ireland) Fergus McFadden
OC	13	(Ireland) Brian O'Driscoll
IC	12	(Ireland) Ian Madigan
LW	11	(Ireland) Andrew Conway
FH	10	(Ireland) Johnny Sexton
SH	9	(Ireland) Isaac Boss
N8	8	(Ireland) Jamie Heaslip
OF	7	(Ireland) Shane Jennings
BF	6	(Ireland) Kevin McLaughlin
RL	5	(Ireland) Devin Toner		(substituted off) 73'
LL	4	(Ireland) Leo Cullen (c)
TP	3	(Ireland) Mike Ross		(substituted off) 75'
HK	2	(Ireland) Richardt Strauss		(substituted off) 29'	(substituted on) 40'
LP	1	(Ireland) Cian Healy		(substituted off) 77'
Replacements:
HK	16	(Ireland) Seán Cronin		(substituted on) 29'	(substituted off) 40'
PR	17	(Ireland) Jack McGrath		(substituted on) 77'
PR	18	(Ireland) Jamie Hagan		(substituted on) 75'
LK	19	(South Africa) Quinn Roux		(substituted on) 73'
FL	20	(Ireland) Rhys Ruddock
SH	21	(Ireland) John Cooney
CE	22	(New Zealand) Andrew Goodman
WG	23	(Ireland) David Kearney
Coach:
(New Zealand) Josef Schmidt

Man of the Match:
(Ireland) Shane Jennings (Leinster)

Touch judges:
George Clancy (Ireland)
Peter Fitzgibbon (Ireland)
Television match official:
Dermot Moloney (Ireland)

=== End-of-season awards ===
Award	Winner
Players' Player of the Season:	(New Zealand) Nick Williams (Ulster)
Young Player of the Season:	(Ireland) Luke Marshall (Ulster)
Fairplay Award:	Ulster
Try of the Season:	(Ireland) Andrew Trimble (Ulster vs Connacht)

2012–2013 Dream Team

Pos		Player	Team
IC	12	(Ireland) Luke Marshall	Ulster
N8	8	(New Zealand) Nick Williams	Ulster

== Home attendance ==
Domestic League					European Cup					Total	
League	Fixtures	Average Attendance	Highest	Lowest	League	Fixtures	Average Attendance	Highest	Lowest	Total Attendance	Average Attendance
2012–13 Pro12	12	10,373	11,078	8,108	2012–13 Heineken Cup	3	11,123	11,451	10,940	157,840	10,523

== Friendlies ==
9 August 2012	Bayonne (France)	15-20	(Ireland) Ulster	Stade Jean-Dauger, Bayonne
	Try: Michael Heaney; McComb; Con: O'Connor (2); Pen: Jackson; O'Connor	Report	Try: Roumieu (2); Garcia; Con: Potgieter; Pen: Garcia
Ulster lineup: 1. Callum Black, 2. Niall Annett, 3. Adam Macklin, 4. Johann Muller (c), 5. Neil McComb, 6. Mike McComish, 7. Sean Doyle, 8. Robbie Diack, 9. Blane McIlroy, 10. Paddy Jackson, 11. Chris Cochrane, 12. Chris Farrell, 13. Jared Payne, 14. Craig Gilroy, 15. Peter Nelson.; Replacements: Rob Herring, Ricky Lutton, John Afoa, Lewis Stevenson, Ali Birch, Michael Heaney, Niall O'Connor, Michael Allen, Luke Marshall, Ricky Andrew.

19 August 2012	Ulster (Ireland)	14-14	(England) Leicester Tigers	Ravenhill, Belfast
	Try: Penalty try Cochrane; Con: O'Connor; Jackson	Report	Try: Goneva; Waldrom; Con: Ford (2)
Ulster lineup: 1. Callum Black, 2. Nigel Brady, 3. Declan Fitzpatrick, 4. Johann Muller (c), 5. Lewis Stevenson, 6. Robbie Diack, 7. Ali Birch, 8. Nick Williams, 9. Michael Heaney, 10. Niall O'Connor, 11. Michael Allen, 12. Luke Marshall, 13. Chris Farrell, 14. Chris Cochrane, 15. Jared Payne.; Replacements: Ricky Lutton, Rob Herring (for Brady 40'), Niall Annett, John Afoa (for Fitzpatrick 26'), Adam Macklin (Afoa 65'), Neil McComb (for Stevenson 40'), Mike McComish (for Birch 40'), Sean Doyle (for Williams 40'), Blane McIlroy (for Heaney 64'), Paddy Jackson (for O'Connor 40'), Stuart Olding (for Allen 65'), Ricky Andrew (for Cochrane 40'), Peter Nelson (for L. Marshall 40').

24 August 2012	Ulster (Ireland)	24-20	(England) Newcastle Falcons	Ravenhill, Belfast
	Try: Williams (2); Allen; Payne; Con: Jackson (2)	Report	Try: Tait; Hall; Sole; Con: Gopperth; Pen: Gopperth
Ulster lineup: 1. Callum Black, 2. Rob Herring, 3. Declan Fitzpatrick, 4. Johann Muller (c), 5. Lewis Stevenson, 6. Robbie Diack, 7. Mike McComish, 8. Nick Williams, 9. Michael Heaney, 10. Paddy Jackson, 11. Craig Gilroy, 12. Luke Marshall, 13. Chris Farrell, 14. Michael Allen, 15. Jared Payne.; Replacements: Niall Annett, Nigel Brady, Ricky Lutton, John Afoa, Adam Macklin, Neil McComb, Ali Birch, Sean Doyle, Blane McIlroy, Niall O'Connor, Peter Nelson, Ricky Andrew, Chris Cochrane.

== Ulster Women ==
=== 2012-13 Women's Interprovincial Series ===
	Team	P	W	D	L	PF	PA	BP	Pts
1	Munster	3	3	0	0	75	25	0	12
2	Leinster	3	2	0	1	56	35	1	9
3	Ulster	3	1	0	2	48	65	2	6
4	Connacht	3	0	0	3	8	62	3	3

2 December 2012	Ulster	10-36	Munster	Upper Malone, Belfast

8 December 2012	Leinster	24-20	Ulster	Milltown House, Ashbourne

15 December 2012	Connacht	5-18	Ulster	The Sportsground, Galway

== Ulster Rugby Awards ==
The Ulster Rugby Awards ceremony was held on 10 May 2013. Winners were:

- Bank of Ireland Ulster Player of the Year: Andrew Trimble
- Heineken Ulster Rugby Personality of the Year: Nevin Spence
- BT Sports Young Player of the Year: Iain Henderson
- Ulster Rugby Supporters Club Player of the Year: Andrew Trimble
- Abbey Insurance Academy Player of the Year: Stuart Olding
- Belfast Telegraph Most Improved Player of the Year: Robbie Diack
- Danske Bank Ulster Schools Player of the Year: Jack Owens, Campbell College
