= 2013 Pro12 Grand Final =

Rugby union match

- Event: 2012–13 Pro12
Ulster	Leinster
(Ireland)	(Ireland)
18	24
- Date: 25 May 2013
- Venue: RDS Arena, Dublin
- Man of the Match: Shane Jennings
- Referee: John Lacey (IRFU)
- Attendance: 19,200
- Weather: Sunny

The 2013 Pro12 Grand Final was the final match of the 2012–13 Pro12 season. The 2012–13 season was the second with RaboDirect as title sponsor and the fourth ever League Grand Final. Leinster won the game 24–18 against Ulster.

The win for Leinster ended a run of three successive league final losses. A Shane Jennings try in the first half helped Leinster to a 16-6 half-time lead, with Jamie Heaslip getting the second try in the second half.

It was Johnny Sexton's final match for Leinster before joining Racing Métro, and also coach Joe Schmidt's last match before taking over as head coach of the Irish rugby team.

== Route to the final ==
=== 2013 Playoffs ===
The semi-finals were played on the weekend of 10/11 May 2013; these followed a 1 v 4, 2 v 3 system with the games being played at the home ground of the higher placed teams.

10 May 2013
19:45

Ulster (Ireland)	28–17	(Wales) Scarlets
Try: Bowe 25' c Diack 34' m Court 43' c Con: Pienaar (2/3); Pen: Pienaar (3/4) 7', 40', 63'	Report	Try: G. Davies 61' c Timani 79' c Con: O. Williams (2/2); Pen: O. Williams (1/2) 5'

Ravenhill
Attendance: 10,700
Referee: Alain Rolland (IRFU)

11 May 2013
19:35

Leinster (Ireland)	17–15	(Scotland) Glasgow Warriors
Try: Heaslip 27' m Pen: J. Sexton (4/6) 12', 32', 63', 70'	Report	Try: Matawalu 15' c Bennett 75' m Con: Hogg (1/2); Pen: Hogg (1/1) 25'

Royal Dublin Society
Attendance: 13,235
Referee: Pascal Gaüzère (FFR)

== Match ==
=== Details ===
25 May 2013
16:45

Ulster (Ireland)	18–24	(Ireland) Leinster
Pen: Pienaar (6/6) 24', 36', 47', 51', 56', 69'	Report	Try: Jennings 3' c Heaslip 63' m Con: J. Sexton (1/2); Pen: J. Sexton (4/5) 8', 34', 40', 45'

Royal Dublin Society
Attendance: 19,200
Referee: John Lacey (Ireland)

FB	15	(Ireland) Jared Payne
RW	14	(Ireland) Andrew Trimble
OC	13	(Ireland) Darren Cave
IC	12	(Ireland) Stuart Olding		(substituted off) 64'
LW	11	(Ireland) Tommy Bowe
FH	10	(Ireland) Paddy Jackson
SH	9	(South Africa) Ruan Pienaar
N8	8	(New Zealand) Nick Williams
OF	7	(Ireland) Chris Henry
BF	6	(Ireland) Robbie Diack	(yellow card) 44' to 54'	(substituted off) 64'
RL	5	(Ireland) Dan Tuohy
LL	4	(South Africa) Johann Muller (c)
TP	3	(New Zealand) John Afoa
HK	2	(Ireland) Rory Best
LP	1	(Ireland) Tom Court		(substituted off) 73'
Replacements:
HK	16	(Ireland) Rob Herring
PR	17	(Ireland) Callum Black		(substituted on) 73'
PR	18	(Ireland) Declan Fitzpatrick
LK	19	(Ireland) Iain Henderson		(substituted on) 64'
FL	20	(Ireland) Mike McComish
SH	21	(Ireland) Paul Marshall
CE	22	(Ireland) Mike Allen		(substituted on) 64'
FB	23	(Ireland) Peter Nelson
Coach:
(New Zealand) Mark Anscombe

FB	15	(Fiji) Isa Nacewa	(yellow card) 47' to 57'
RW	14	(Ireland) Fergus McFadden
OC	13	(Ireland) Brian O'Driscoll
IC	12	(Ireland) Ian Madigan
LW	11	(Ireland) Andrew Conway
FH	10	(Ireland) Johnny Sexton
SH	9	(Ireland) Isaac Boss
N8	8	(Ireland) Jamie Heaslip
OF	7	(Ireland) Shane Jennings
BF	6	(Ireland) Kevin McLaughlin
RL	5	(Ireland) Devin Toner		(substituted off) 73'
LL	4	(Ireland) Leo Cullen (c)
TP	3	(Ireland) Mike Ross		(substituted off) 75'
HK	2	(Ireland) Richardt Strauss		(substituted off) 29'	(substituted on) 40'
LP	1	(Ireland) Cian Healy		(substituted off) 77'
Replacements:
HK	16	(Ireland) Seán Cronin		(substituted on) 29'	(substituted off) 40'
PR	17	(Ireland) Jack McGrath		(substituted on) 77'
PR	18	(Ireland) Jamie Hagan		(substituted on) 75'
LK	19	(Ireland) Quinn Roux		(substituted on) 73'
FL	20	(Ireland) Rhys Ruddock
SH	21	(Ireland) John Cooney
CE	22	(New Zealand) Andrew Goodman
WG	23	(Ireland) Dave Kearney
Coach:
(New Zealand) Josef Schmidt

Man of the Match:
(Ireland) Shane Jennings (Leinster)

Touch judges:
George Clancy (Ireland)
Peter Fitzgibbon (Ireland)
Television match official:
Dermot Moloney (Ireland)
