= Munster Senior League =

Munster Senior League may refer to:

- Munster Senior League (rugby union)
- Munster Senior League (association football)
- Munster Senior Hurling League
