= John Lacey (rugby union) =

Irish rugby union player & referee

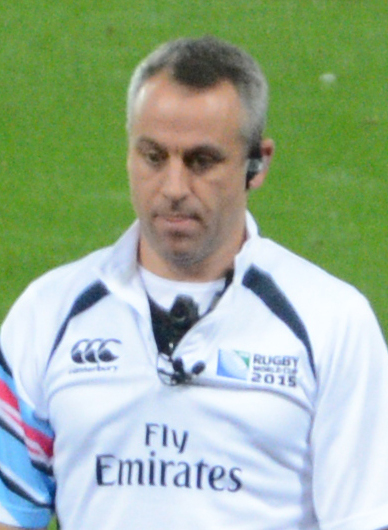
- Lacey in 2015
- Born: 12 October 1973 (age 53) Tipperary, Ireland
- Height: 1.85 m (6 ft 1 in)
- Weight: 80 kg (12 st 8 lb; 176 lb)
- School: Abbey CBS
- University: Dublin Institute of Technology; HSI College of Business, Limerick

Rugby union career
- Position: Winger/Full-back
Senior career
Years	Team	Apps	(Points)
19xx–1995	Clanwilliam		
1995–1997	Sundays Well		
1997–2007	Shannon		
Provincial / State sides
Years	Team	Apps	(Points)
1995–1999	Munster	12	(45)
International career
Years	Team	Apps	(Points)
199x–20xx	Ireland A		
National sevens team
Years	Team		Comps
199x–20xx	Ireland Sevens		
Refereeing career
Years	Competition		Apps
2007	Munster Schools Junior Cup		
2007	All-Ireland League		
2008–	Celtic League/Pro14		
2009	IRB Nations Cup		
2009–	European Rugby Challenge Cup		
2010–	European Rugby Champions Cup		
2010–11	IRB Junior World Championship		
2010	Test Matches		
2010–	→ European Nations Cup		
2012–	→ Summer Internationals		
2012–	→ Autumn Internationals		
2014–	→ Six Nations Championship		
2014–	→ Rugby Championship		
2015	→ Rugby World Cup		

John Lacey is a former Ireland A and Ireland Sevens rugby union international and current rugby union referee. As a player, Lacey spent most of career with Shannon in the All-Ireland League. He also represented Munster. As an international referee he has taken charge of matches in the Six Nations Championship, the Rugby Championship and the Rugby World Cup. He also refereed the 2013 Pro12 Grand Final and the 2015–16 and 2016–17 European Rugby Challenge Cup finals.

== Early life ==
Between 1986 and 1991, Lacey attended Abbey CBS in Tipperary where he studied for his Leaving Certificate. His classmates included Alan Quinlan. Between 1991 and 1993, he attended the Dublin Institute of Technology where he gained a diploma in hotel and catering management. Between 1993 and 1994, he gained a diploma in travel and tourism.

== Playing career ==
=== Clubs ===
Lacey began his playing career with Clanwilliam before joining Sundays Well. In 1997, he switched to Shannon and was subsequently a prominent member of their team that won five All-Ireland League titles, four Munster Senior League titles^{[Note 1]} and eight Munster Senior Cups^{[Note 2]}. Lacey was a prolific try scorer in the AIL, touching down on 57 occasions – including 10 for Sundays Well. In 2003, he became the first player to score 50 tries in the AIL. While playing at club level, Lacey also worked for Allied Irish Banks and as sales representative for the East Cork Oil Company before becoming a coach development officer for Munster Rugby in 1999.

=== Munster ===
In December 1995, aged 22, Lacey made his debut for Munster in a friendly against Transvaal. On 7 September 1997 Lacey scored a try as he made his Heineken Cup debut in a 1997–98 pool stage game against Harlequins. Lacey scored four tries in six Heineken Cup appearances for Munster. He also scored five tries in six Irish Interprovincial Rugby Championship appearances as he helped Munster win two titles.

=== Ireland international ===
At international level, Lacey played for both Ireland A and the Ireland Sevens.

== Refereeing career ==
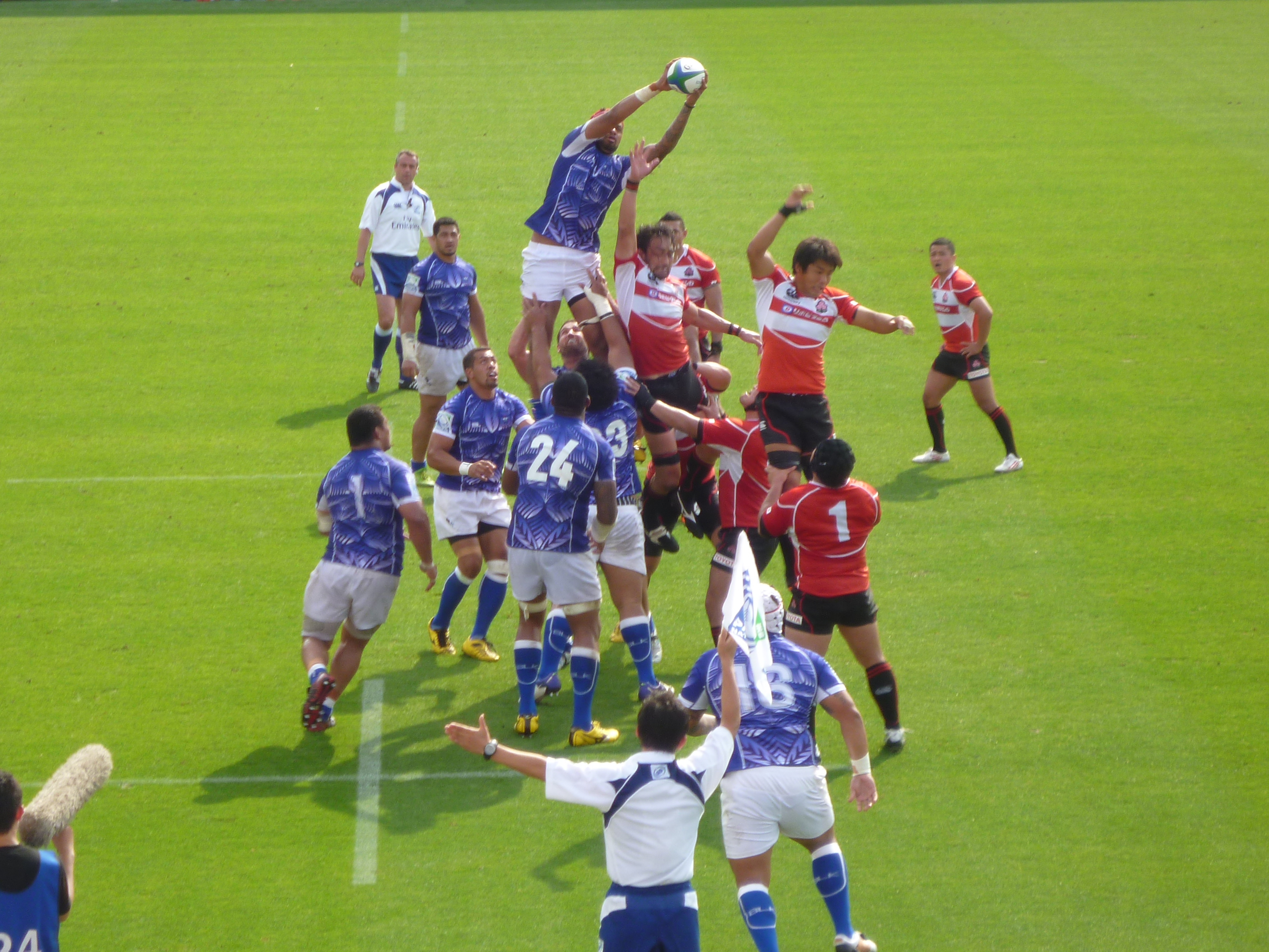
John Lacey officiating Pacific Nations Cup Match at Chichibunomiya Stadium on 17 June 2012, in which Samoa defeated Japan 27-26

=== Early years ===
In April 2007, while still working as a coach development officer for Munster Rugby, Lacey agreed to take charge of a Munster Schools Junior Cup quarter-final between St Munchin's College and CBC after the original referee failed to show up. He subsequently began refereeing games in the All-Ireland League before making his Celtic League debut on 28 November 2008 when he took charge of a game between Edinburgh and the Ospreys.

=== European competitions ===
By 2009–10 Lacey was taking charge of matches in the European Challenge Cup. On 8 October 2010 Lacey made his debut as a Heineken Cup referee when he took charge of a 2010–11 pool stage game between Northampton Saints and Castres Olympique. This saw Lacey become the third referee, after Alain Rolland and Malcolm Changleng, to both play in and referee Heineken Cup matches. Lacey has subsequently refereed the 2013 Pro12 Grand Final, and the 2015–16 and 2016–17 European Rugby Challenge Cup finals

=== International referee ===
Lacey gained his first experience as an international referee at the 2009 IRB Nations Cup. On 27 March 2010 he took charge of his first senior international, a European Nations Cup match between Romania and Spain. Lacey subsequently took charge of pool stage matches and semi-finals at both the 2010 and 2011 IRB Junior World Championships. In 2012 Lacey began to referee top level international games. On 27 May 2012 he took charge of a match between England and the Barbarians at Twickenham Stadium. In June he took charge of two matches at the IRB Pacific Nations Cup. On 24 November 2012 Lacey took charge of a match between France and Samoa at the Stade de France. On 1 February 2014 Lacey made his debut as a Six Nations Championship referee when he took charge of a match between Wales and Italy at the Millennium Stadium. On 16 August 2014 Lacey made his debut as a Rugby Championship referee when he took charge of a match between South Africa and Argentina at the Loftus Versfeld Stadium. Lacey also served as a referee at the 2015 Rugby World Cup and took charge of the bronze final between South Africa and Argentina. In October 2017, together with Andrew Brace, George Clancy and Joy Neville, Lacey was one of seven referees offered professional contracts by the IRFU.

== Honours ==
Shannon

- All-Ireland League
  - Winners: 1997–98, 2001–02, 2003–04, 2004–05, 2005–06: 5
- Munster Senior League
  - Winners: 2000–01, 2001–02, 2004–05, ? : 4 ^{[Note 1]}
- Munster Senior Cup
  - Winners: 1997–98, 1999–2000, 2000–01, 2001–02, 2002–03, 2003–04, 2004–05, 2005–06: 8 ^{[Note 2]}

Munster Rugby

- Irish Interprovincial Rugby Championship
  - Winners: 1996–97, 1998–99: 2

Individual

- Munster Rugby Referee of the Year
  - 2009, 2012: 2

Notes

- ^1 Possibly includes a title won with Sundays Well.
- ^2 Some sources say seven, others say eight.
