= Conor Burke (rugby union) =

Irish former rugby union player

- Born: 23 August 1974 (age 52) Ireland
- Height: 1.75 m (5 ft 9 in)
- Weight: 76 kg (12.0 st; 168 lb)

Rugby union career
- Position: Centre
Senior career
Years	Team	Apps	(Points)
1997	Munster	3	(34)

Conor Burke (born 23 August 1974) is an Irish former rugby union player.

== Career ==
Burke, a centre, made three appearances for Munster during the 1997–98 Heineken Cup pool stage against Bourgoin, Cardiff and Harlequins, scoring 34 points.
