= Ernie Keeffe =

Irish rugby union player

- Full name: Ernest P. Keeffe
- Born: 16 March 1919 Cork, Ireland
- Died: 30 November 1991 (aged 72) Cork, Ireland

Rugby union career
- Position: Lock
International career
| Years | Team | Apps | (Points) |
| 1947–48 | Ireland | 6 | (0) |

Ernest P. Keeffe (16 March 1919 — 30 November 1991) was an Irish international rugby union player.

Born in Cork, Keeffe was a Sundays Well forward, capped six times for Ireland. He played in Ireland's second row for all four 1947 Five Nations matches and ended the year with an appearance against the touring Wallabies, used as a wing-forward. In 1948, Keeffe featured in the first Five Nations match, a win over France in Paris, en route to the team claiming their first ever grand slam.

Keeffe also represented Ireland as a boxer.

== See also ==
- List of Ireland national rugby union players
