= Old Crescent RFC =

Irish rugby union club, based in Limerick

(Republic of Ireland) Old Crescent RFC
- Full name: Old Crescent Rugby Football Club
- Union: (Ireland) IRFU
- Branch: Munster
- Nickname: Crescent
- Founded: 1947; 79 years ago
- Ground(s): Takumi Park, Rosbrien, Limerick, V94 K5V2 (Capacity: 5000)
- President: Liam Keehan
- Coach: Michael Harding
- Captain: TBC
- League: A.I.L. Div. 2A
- 2024–25: 7th.
Team kit

Official website
- www.oldcrescentrfc.com

Old Crescent is a senior rugby union club in Limerick, playing in Division 2A of the All-Ireland League.

== History ==
=== Early years ===
Old Crescent grew out of the Crescent College Munster School's cup team of 1947. Fr Gerry Guinane, who trained rugby in the College, saw great potential in that winning team and persuaded them to stay and play together. In September 1947 it became a member club of the Munster Branch of the Irish Rugby Football Union. In 1952 the club was promoted to senior club membership of the Branch and the ‘Ginner’s’ formidable negotiating skills were more than useful in the process. Father Guinane remained deeply involved with the club until his death.

Membership was initially confined to past pupils of Crescent College SJ, however it has been an 'open club' for many years. Contact is closely maintained with the school, and pupils and past pupils are encouraged to play with the club.

Father Guinane’s belief in the original team was justified as in 1950/51 it reached the Munster Junior Cup final losing out to Cork Constitution five points to three and in 1954/55 again won through to the Munster Senior Cup final losing out in the end to UCC. Over the years progress on the field was mixed. In 1961/62 under the captaincy of Billy Leahy the club again reached the Munster Senior Cup Final only to lose to Bohemians. In 1976 the club won its first senior trophy, the Limerick Charity Cup.

=== 1990s–present ===
In 1991/92 Old Crescent won the Munster Senior League and went on to defeat the winners of the Leinster, Connacht, and Ulster Senior Leagues, Clontarf, Galwegians, and NIFC respectively. Old Crescent, Clontarf and Galwegians won promotion to the All Ireland League. Malone, CYMS and Sundays Well lost their places. In 1995 / 96 under the captaincy of Diarmuid Reddan and the coaching team of Larry Greene, Jed O'Dwyer and John Hogan, the club won the Division 2 title going undefeated in the league campaign and achieved promotion to Division 1.

The team held their position in Division 1 for 2 years, then regained their place for a season in 1999 / 2000. Since then the team has been a constant challenger for promotion many times coming within a game of this. At junior level, the 3rd XV captained by Mike O'Mara and managed by Eugene O'Riordan captured National honours by winning the Junior 2 Millennium Cup in 2001 / 2002.

In the season 2024/25, the club reached both the Munster Senior Challenge Cup & Junior Cup for the first time in the clubs history, unfortunately succumbing to a strong Nenagh Ormond side in the Senior Cup and losing out in the last few minutes to Cork Constitution in the Junior Cup

== Honours ==
- All-Ireland League Division 2: 1995-96
- Munster Senior League: (4) 1992, 1997, 1999 (shared with Sunday's Well), 2000 (shared with Young Munster)

== Notable players ==
- Andrew Brace — played for the Belgium national team; professional referee affiliated with the IRFU.
- Eoin Reddan - played for Ireland
- Mike Mullins - played for Ireland and Munster
- Ian Jones - New Zealand international
