= 1997–98 Heineken Cup pool stage =

- Season: 1997–98 Heineken Cup
- Date: 5 September 1997 – 12 October 1997

Qualifiers
- Seed 1: (England) London Wasps
- Seed 2: (France) Toulouse
- Seed 3: (England) Bath
- Seed 4: (France) Pau
- Seed 5: (England) Harlequins
- Seed 6: (France) Brive
- Seed 7: (Wales) Cardiff
- Seed 8: (England) Leicester Tigers

The 1997–98 Heineken Cup pool stage took place in September and October 1997. The winner of each pool advanced to the quarter-finals, with the runners-up and best third placed team entering the quarter-final play-offs for the final three quarter final places.

== Pool 1 ==
Team	P	W	D	L	Tries for	Tries against	Try diff	Points for	Points against	Points diff	Pts
(France) Toulouse	6	5	0	1	25	12	13	200	121	79	10
(England) Leicester	6	4	0	2	16	14	2	163	117	46	8
(Ireland) Leinster	6	2	0	4	15	19	−4	137	167	−30	4
(Italy) Milan	6	1	0	5	15	26	−11	111	206	−95	2

6 September 1997
15:00

Leinster (Ireland)	25–34	(France) Toulouse

Donnybrook
Attendance: 6,300

7 September 1997
15:00

Leicester Tigers (England)	26–10	(Italy) Milan

Welford Road
Attendance: 9,300

12 September 1997
17:30

Leinster (Ireland)	16–9	(England) Leicester Tigers

Donnybrook
Attendance: 7,000

13 September 1997
16:00

Milan (Italy)	14–19	(France) Toulouse

Stadio Comunale Giuriati
Attendance: 2,000

20 September 1997
16:00

Milan (Italy)	33–32	(Ireland) Leinster

Stadio Comunale Giuriati
Attendance: 1,100

20 September 1997
18:05

Toulouse (France)	17–22	(England) Leicester Tigers

Les Sept Deniers
Attendance: 11,000

27 September 1997
15:00

Leicester Tigers (England)	47–22	(Ireland) Leinster

Welford Road
Attendance: 10,392

27 September 1997
18:00

Toulouse (France)	69–19	(Italy) Milan

Les Sept Deniers
Attendance: 7,000

4 October 1997
14:15

Leicester Tigers (England)	22–23	(France) Toulouse

Welford Road
Attendance: 10,600

4 October 1997
15:00

Leinster (Ireland)	23–6	(Italy) Milan

Donnybrook
Attendance: 5,500

11 October 1997
15:20

Toulouse (France)	38–19	(Ireland) Leinster

Les Sept Deniers
Attendance: 7,000

12 October 1997
15:00

Milan (Italy)	29–37	(England) Leicester Tigers

Stadio Comunale Giuriati
Attendance: 2,000

== Pool 2 ==
Team	P	W	D	L	Tries for	Tries against	Try diff	Points for	Points against	Points diff	Pts
(England) Wasps	6	6	0	0	31	12	19	243	104	139	12
(Scotland) Glasgow	6	3	0	3	14	15	−1	132	167	−35	6
(Wales) Swansea	6	2	0	4	15	16	−1	157	161	−4	4
(Ireland) Ulster	6	1	0	5	6	23	−17	95	195	−100	2

7 September 1997
15:15

Swansea (Wales)	25–31	(England) London Wasps

St. Helen's
Attendance: 5,000

8 September 1997
19:00

Ulster (Ireland)	12 – 18	(Scotland) Glasgow
Pen: Laing (3); Drop: Laing	Report	Try: Craig, Wallace; Con: Hayes; Pen: Hayes (2)

Ravenhill
Attendance: 2,100

13 September 1997
14:00

Swansea (Wales)	33 – 16	(Ireland) Ulster
Try: Gibbs; H. Thomas; Con: A. Thomas; Pen: A. Thomas (7)	Report	Try: Gallick; Con: Laing; Pen: Laing (3)

St. Helen's
Attendance: 3,000
Referee: K. McCartney

14 September 1997
15:00

Glasgow (Scotland)	22–46	(England) London Waps

Scotstoun Stadium
Attendance: 3,500

21 September 1997
15:00

Glasgow (Scotland)	35–21	(Wales) Swansea

Scotstoun Stadium
Attendance: 3,000

21 September 1997
15:00

London Wasps (England)	56 – 3	(Ireland) Ulster
Try: Mitchell, Wood, King, Logan (3), Greenstock; Rosier; Con: Rees (5); Pen: Rees	Report	Pen: Laing

Loftus Road Stadium
Attendance: 4,120

27 September 1997
14:30

Ulster (Ireland)	28 – 20	(Wales) Swansea
Try: Penalty try, Jackson, McWhirter; Con: Laing (2); Pen: Laing (3)	Report	Try: Rees (2), Williams; Con: Williams; Pen: Williams

Ravenhill
Attendance: 2,500
Referee: George Hughes

28 September 1997
15:00

London Wasps (England)	43–5	(Scotland) Glasgow

Loftus Road Stadium
Attendance: 3,825

3 October 1997
19:30

Ulster (Ireland)	21 – 38	(England) London Wasps
Try: Jan Cunningham (2); Con: Laing; Pen: Laing (3)	Report	Try: Henderson, Rosier, White, Greenstock, Dallaglio; Con: Rees (5); Pen: Rees

Ravenhill
Attendance: 3,250

4 October 1997
14:15

Swansea (Wales)	30–22	(Scotland) Glasgow

St. Helen's
Attendance: 3,000

12 October 1997
15:00

Glasgow (Scotland)	30 – 15	(Ireland) Ulster
Try: Penalty try, Stott, Hayes; Con: Hayes (3); Pen: Hayes (3)	Report	Pen: Laing (5)

Scotstoun Stadium
Attendance: 4,000

12 October 1997
15:00

London Wasps (England)	29–28	(Wales) Swansea

Loftus Road Stadium
Attendance: 3,500

== Pool 3 ==
Team	P	W	D	L	Tries for	Tries against	Try diff	Points for	Points against	Points diff	Pts
(England) Bath	6	5	0	1	12	12	0	141	119	22	10
(France) Brive	6	4	1	1	24	13	11	210	146	64	9
(Wales) Pontypridd	6	2	1	3	17	13	4	154	147	7	5
(Scotland) Scottish Borders	6	0	0	6	14	29	−15	129	222	−93	0

7 September 1997
14:15

Brive (France)	56–18	(Scotland) Borders

Parc Municipal des Sports
Attendance: 8,000

7 September 1997
14:15

Pontypridd (Wales)	15–21	(England) Bath

Sardis Road
Attendance: 7,000

14 September 1997
14:30

Borders (Scotland)	17–31	(England) Bath

Mansfield Park
Attendance: 5,000

14 September 1997
15:30

Brive (France)	32–31	(Wales) Pontypridd

Parc Municipal des Sports
Attendance: 4,500

20 September 1997
14:15

Bath (England)	27–25	(France) Brive

Recreation Ground
Attendance: 8,500

20 September 1997
19:00

Borders (Scotland)	16–23	(Wales) Pontypridd

Poynder Park
Attendance: 4,000

27 September 1997
14:15

Pontypridd (Wales)	29–29	(France) Brive

Sardis Road
Attendance: 7,800

27 September 1997
15:00

Bath (England)	27–23	(Scotland) Borders

Recreation Ground
Attendance: 5,000

4 October 1997
14:15

Pontypridd (Wales)	46–26	(Scotland) Borders

Sardis Road
Attendance: 4,500

5 October 1997
14:20

Brive (France)	29–12	(England) Bath

Parc Municipal des Sports
Attendance: 10,000

11 October 1997
14:15

Bath (England)	23–10	(Wales) Pontypridd

Recreation Ground
Attendance: 7,500

12 October 1997
14:30

Borders (Scotland)	29–39	(France) Brive

Netherdale
Attendance: 4,000

== Pool 4 ==
Team	P	W	D	L	Tries for	Tries against	Try diff	Points for	Points against	Points diff	Pts
(England) Harlequins	6	4	0	2	21	12	9	198	141	57	8
(Wales) Cardiff	6	4	0	2	17	15	2	184	146	38	8
(Ireland) Munster	6	2	0	4	14	21	−7	141	180	−39	4
(France) Bourgoin	6	2	0	4	7	11	−4	93	149	−56	4

5 September 1997
16:05

Bourgoin (France)	26–25	(Wales) Cardiff

Stade Pierre Rajon
Attendance: 6,000

7 September 1997
14:00

Harlequins (England)	48–40	(Ireland) Munster

Twickenham Stoop
Attendance: 3,682

13 September 1997
14:15

Harlequins (England)	45–7	(France) Bourgoin

Twickenham Stoop
Attendance: 3,700

13 September 1997
14:30

Cardiff (Wales)	43–23	(Ireland) Munster

Cardiff Arms Park
Attendance: 4,500

20 September 1997
15:00

Munster (Ireland)	17–15	(France) Bourgoin

Thomond Park
Attendance: 6,000

21 September 1997
14:15

Cardiff (Wales)	21–28	(England) Harlequins

Cardiff Arms Park
Attendance: 6,000

27 September 1997
15:00

Munster (Ireland)	32–37	(Wales) Cardiff

Musgrave Park
Attendance: 5,000

27 September 1997
18:05

Bourgoin (France)	18–30	(England) Harlequins

Stade Pierre Rajon
Attendance: 7,500

4 October 1997
15:00

Bourgoin (France)	21–6	(Ireland) Munster

Stade Pierre Rajon
Attendance: 6,000

4 October 1997
15:00

Harlequins (England)	31–32	(Wales) Cardiff

Twickenham Stoop
Attendance: 8,000

11 October 1997
14:30

Cardiff (Wales)	26–6	(France) Bourgoin

Cardiff Arms Park
Attendance: 5,928

12 October 1997
14:30

Munster (Ireland)	23–16	(England) Harlequins

Thomond Park
Attendance: 10,000

== Pool 5 ==
Team	P	W	D	L	Tries for	Tries against	Try diff	Points for	Points against	Points diff	Pts
(France) Pau	6	4	0	2	27	8	19	203	89	114	8
(Wales) Llanelli	6	4	0	2	15	18	−3	144	142	2	8
(Italy) Benetton Treviso	6	2	0	4	18	19	−1	146	162	−16	4
(Scotland) Caledonia	6	2	0	4	8	23	−15	89	189	−100	4

6 September 1997
20:00

Benetton Treviso (Italy)	18–19	(France) Pau

Stadio Comunale di Monigo
Attendance: 4,000

7 September 1997
15:00

Caledonia (Scotland)	18–23	(Wales) Llanelli Scarlets

McDiarmid Park
Attendance: 2,300

13 September 1997
18:05

Pau (France)	44–12	(Wales) Llanelli Scarlets

Stade du Hameau
Attendance: 5,000

14 September 1997
15:00

Caledonia (Scotland)	17–9	(Italy) Benetton Treviso

McDiarmid Park
Attendance: 2,000

20 September 1997
14:00

Llanelli (Wales)	39–18	(Italy) Benetton Treviso

Stradey Park
Attendance: 3,000

20 September 1997
18:00

Pau (France)	50–8	(Scotland) Caledonia

Stade du Hameau
Attendance: 6,500

27 September 1997
15:00

Benetton Treviso (Italy)	52–6	(Scotland) Caledonia

Stadio Comunale di Monigo
Attendance: 3,500

28 September 1997
14:15

Llanelli (Wales)	14–10	(France) Pau

Stradey Park
Attendance: 3,500

4 October 1997
15:00

Benetton Treviso (Italy)	42–25	(Wales) Llanelli

Stadio Comunale di Monigo
Attendance: 4,000

5 October 1997
15:00

Caledonia (Scotland)	30–24	(France) Pau

McDiarmid Park
Attendance: 3,000

11 October 1997
14:00

Llanelli (Wales)	31–10	(Scotland) Caledonia

Stradey Park
Attendance: 3,000

11 October 1997
19:30

Pau (France)	56–7	(Italy) Benetton Treviso

Stade du Hameau
Attendance: 7,500

== See also ==
- 1997-98 Heineken Cup
