= Sundays Well RFC =

Irish rugby union club, based in Cork City

(Republic of Ireland) Sundays Well RFC
- Full name: Sundays Well Rugby Football Club
- Union: (Ireland) IRFU; Munster
- Nickname: The Well
- Founded: 1906; 120 years ago
- Ground(s): Musgrave Park, Cork (Capacity: 8,008)
- League: Munster Junior League Division 1
- 2025-2026: 7th
Team kit

Official website
- sundayswellrfc.com

Sundays Well Rugby Football Club is an amateur rugby union team based in Cork City, Ireland. Originally founded in 1906 in the Sunday's Well area on the northside of Cork city, it has been based at Musgrave Park on the city's southside since the mid-20th century. The club's first team competes in the Munster Junior League Division 1 following relegation from Division 2C of the Energia All Ireland League in 2023.

Sundays Well RFC is home to the first Irish Mixed Ability Rugby Team – Sundays Well Rebels. The team began training together in January 2014 and have had two Mixed Ability World Tournament wins.

The club is also home to womens and touch rugby teams.

== History ==
The club was first formed in 1906, however through lack of funds and permanent grounds, it was dissolved at the end of the 1907/1908 season. At the beginning of the 1910/1911 season however, it re-surfaced only for it to disband again three seasons later at the outbreak of the First World War. During that war quite a number of the club members were killed in the conflict. The club, in its present-day format, was re-activated in 1923, and progressed to rented grounds at Houndsditch, Clogheen, Cork City, and then to grounds at Shanakiel, Cork City (the committee and dressing rooms were in a building at the foot of Shanakiel Hill). During the 1941/1942 season, the club moved to its current home in Musgrave Park, Cork City. In 1960, the present clubhouse was opened with an extension being added in 1981.

The club has an under age section with teams competing at all levels in local South Munster leagues. Teams train in Musgrave Park and in other local facilities.

== Honours ==
- Mixed Ability Rugby World Cup (2): 2015, 2022
- Munster Senior Cup (3): 1949, 1953, 1994
- Munster Senior League (6): 1928, 1935, 1948, 1951, 1960, 1993 (shared in 1999 with Old Crescent RFC)
- Cork Charity Cup (12): 1927/1928, 1934/1935, 1953/1954, 1958/1959, 1980,1981, 1987/1988, 1988/1989, 1990/1991, 1994/1995, 1996/1997, 1997/1998, 2000/2001
- Cork County Cup (2): 2023, 2026
- South Dave Dineen Cup (1): 2026

== Notable former players ==
- Jim Buckley
- Conor Burke
- Ken O'Connell
- David Corkery
- Pat O'Hara
- Denis Hurley
- Ernie Keeffe
- John Lacey
- Sean McCahill
- John O'Neill
- Rory Parata
- Donnacha Ryan
