= Michael White (rugby union) =

Irish rugby union player

- Born: 2 February 1882 County Cork, Ireland
- Died: 26 September 1956 (aged 74) Millbank, London, England

Rugby union career
- Position: Forward
International career
Years	Team	Apps	(Points)
1906–07	Ireland	6	(0)

Michael White (2 February 1882 – 26 September 1956) was an Irish international rugby union player.

White hailed from Macroom in County Cork and attended Queen's University Cork, where played rugby.

A forward, White gained six caps for Ireland, debuting in an away win over England at Leicester in 1906. He featured for Ireland against the 1906–07 Springboks and made his last appearance during the 1907 Home Nations.

White served as a colonel in the Royal Army Medical Corps and received a Military Cross in World War I.

== See also ==
- List of Ireland national rugby union players
