= Shane Roiser =

English rugby union player

Shane Roiser is a former rugby union player with London Wasps whom he joined in 1994 from Rosslyn Park. Whilst at Wasps he helped them win the Anglo-Welsh Cup in 2000.

He was educated at Cumnor House School, Croydon and Trinity School of John Whitgift.

He qualified as a dentist before playing rugby full-time, where he represented England at Student, Development and U21 levels.

His contract with the London Wasps ended in 2004. After Wasps, he played for Blackheath Rugby Club.

After retiring from the professional game, he returned to his profession as a dentist in Oxhey, near Watford, Hertfordshire. He still plays in the occasional match for charity.
