= Iain Henderson =

Northern Irish rugby union player

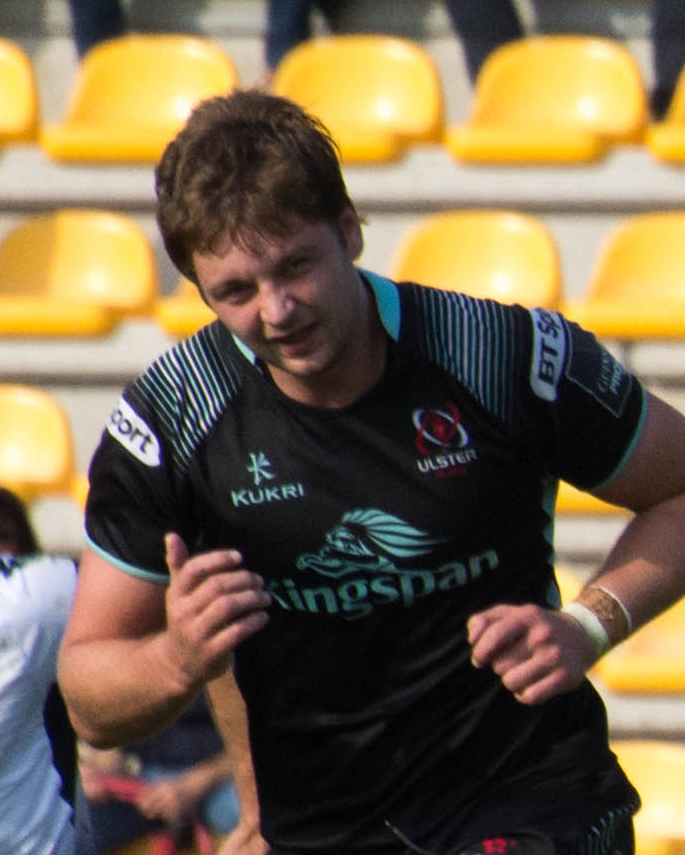
- Henderson in 2017
- Full name: William Iain Henderson
- Born: 21 February 1992 (age 34) Craigavon, Northern Ireland
- Height: 1.99 m (6 ft 6 in)
- Weight: 118 kg (260 lb; 18 st 8 lb)
- School: Belfast Royal Academy
- University: Queen's University Belfast

Rugby union career
- Position(s): Lock, flanker
- Current team: Ulster
Senior career
Years	Team	Apps	(Points)
2012–	Ulster	178	(75)
- Correct as of 8 May 2026
International career
Years	Team	Apps	(Points)
2011–2012	Ireland U20	20	(20)
2012–	Ireland	86	(30)
2014–2015	Ireland Wolfhounds	2	(0)
2017, 2021	British & Irish Lions	0	(0)
- Correct as of 1 November 2025

William Iain Henderson (born 21 February 1992) is an Irish rugby union player from Northern Ireland who plays as a lock for United Rugby Championship club Ulster and the Ireland national team. He has been selected for two tours with the British & Irish Lions. Henderson has been the captain of Ulster since 2019 and captained Ireland in 2021 and 2023.

== Early life ==
Born in Craigavon, County Armagh, he was educated at Belfast Royal Academy, playing in the school's 1st XV that made the Ulster Schools' Cup final in 2010. In July 2010, he was selected for the Ulster/Leinster team against Connacht/Munster in the exhibition game that opened the Aviva Stadium in Dublin. He was due to study actuarial studies at Heriot-Watt University in Edinburgh, but switched to Queen's University Belfast after he was offered a place at the Ulster Rugby Academy.

== Professional career ==
He was awarded the £2,000 Jack Kyle Academy Bursary by the Ulster Rugby Official Supporters Club in December 2011, despite missing the first half of the 2011–12 season with a broken leg sustained playing for the Ulster Ravens. He made his debut for the senior Ulster team in April 2012, and signed his first professional contract in October 2012. He represented Ireland at U19 level and at U20 level, including at the 2012 U20 World Championships. He made his senior Ireland debut in November 2012 in the defeat to South Africa in Dublin.

He was named Young Player of the Year at the 2013 Ulster Rugby Awards, and Personality of the Year in the 2021 Awards. He was part of the Ulster team that made the 2013 Pro12 Grand Final and the 2020 Pro14 Grand Final. He made his 100th appearance for Ulster against Leicester Tigers in the European Rugby Champions Cup in January 2019, and was named Ulster's captain, replacing the retiring Rory Best, ahead of the 2019–20 season.

With Ireland, he won the Six Nations Championship in 2014 and 2015, the Grand Slam in 2018, and the Triple Crown in 2022, and played in the Rugby World Cup in 2015 and 2019. He captained Ireland for the first time in February 2021. He was selected for the British and Irish Lions for their 2017 tour to New Zealand and 2021 tour to South Africa.

Henderson's central contract with the IRFU was due to expire after the 2023 Rugby World Cup, and there was speculation that he might move abroad. He signed an extension in 2023, keeping him with Ulster and Ireland for a further two seasons. He was called up to Ireland's preliminary 42-man squad ahead of the 2023 Rugby World Cup, and captained the side in the warm-up game against Italy on 5 August 2023.

== Honours ==
Ireland

- 5× Six Nations Championship: 2014, 2015, 2018, 2023, 2024
- 2× Grand Slam: 2018, 2023
- 3× Triple Crown: 2018, 2022, 2023
