= Munster Senior League (rugby union) =

The Munster Senior League was a Rugby union competition for senior clubs in Munster.

== History ==
It was first competed for in 1902–03.

== Format ==
Unlike the Munster Senior Cup which is knock-out, the league format means that teams play a number of different games, with the most successful qualifying for the play-offs.

== Decline ==
With the establishment of the All-Ireland League in 1991 the competition declined rapidly, and no longer was contested with the same intensity as previously existed.

== List of champions ==
- 1902-03 Garryowen
- 1903-04 Garryowen
- 1904-05 Garryowen
- 1905-06 Garryowen
- 1906-07 Garryowen
- 1907-08 Garryowen
- 1908-09 Garryowen
- 1909-10 Garryowen
- 1910-11 Garryowen/Cork Constitution
- 1911-12 Garryowen/Cork Constitution
- 1912-13 UCC
- 1913-14 UCC/Cork Constitution
- 1914-21 no competition
- 1921-22 Cork Constitution
- 1922-23 Cork Constitution
- 1923-24 Dolphin
- 1924-25 Garryowen
- 1925-26 Dolphin
- 1927 Cork Constitution
- 1928 Sundays Well
- 1929 Dolphin
- 1930 Young Munster
- 1931 Bohemians/UCC
- 1932 Young Munster
- 1933 UCC
- 1934 UCC
- 1935 Sundays Well
- 1936 Garryowen/UCC
- 1936-37 unfinished
- 1937-38 unfinished
- 1938-39 Cork Constitution
- 1939-40 unfinished
- 1940-41 unfinished
- 1941-42 UCC
- 1943 UCC
- 1944 Young Munster
- 1945 UCC ? beat Cork Constitution
- 1946 Garryowen
- 1947 Garryowen ? beat Dolphin
- 1948 Sundays Well beat Garryowen
- 1949 Dolphin
- 1950 UCC beat Cork Constitution
- 1951 Sundays Well beat Young Munster
- 1952 Young Munster beat Dolphin
- 1953 Cork Constitution beat Bohemians
- 1954 Garryowen
- 1955 Dolphin beat UCC
- 1956 Dolphin
- 1957 Cork Constitution beat UCC
- 1959 Bohemians beat UCC
- 1960 Sundays Well
- 1961 UCC beat Dolphin
- 1962 UCC beat Bohemians
- 1963 UCC beat Highfield
- 1964 Cork Constitution beat Shannon
- 1965 Cork Constitution beat UCC
- 1966 Cork Constitution beat UCC
- 1967 Cork Constitution
- 1968 Cork Constitution
- 1969 Cork Constitution
- 1970 Cork Constitution beat Garryowen
- 1971 Cork Constitution beat Garryowen
- 1972 Cork Constitution beat Garryowen
- 1973 Dolphin beat Cork Constitution
- 1974 UCC beat Highfield
- 1975 Cork Constitution beat Garryowen
- 1976 Cork Constitution beat Dolphin
- 1977 Cork Constitution beat Bohemians
- 1978 UCC beat Garryowen
- 1979 Cork Constitution beat Dolphin
- 1980 Shannon beat Young Munster
- 1981 UCC beat Young Munster
- 1982 Garryowen beat UCC
- 1983 Garryowen beat Shannon
- 1984 Cork Constitution beat Highfield
- 1985 UCC beat Cork Constitution
- 1986 Shannon beat Cork Constitution
- 1987 Cork Constitution beat Young Munster
- 1988 Cork Constitution beat Shannon
- 1989 Shannon beat Cork Constitution
- 1990 Highfield beat Sundays Well
- 1991 Dolphin beat Highfield
- 1992 Old Crescent beat UCC
- 1993 Sundays Well beat Highfield
- 1994
- 1995
- 1996 Young Munster
- 1997 Old Crescent
- 1998 Cork Constitution
- 1998-99 Old Crescent/Sundays Well
- 1999-2000 Old Crescent/Sundays Well
- 2000-01 Garryowen beat Thomond
- 2001-02 Shannon beat Garryowen
- 2002-03 Shannon beat Garryowen
- 2003-04 Cork Constitution beat Garryowen
- 2004-05 Shannon beat UL Bohemians
- 2005-06

== See also ==
- Connacht Senior League
- Leinster Senior League
- Ulster Senior League
