= Ruan Pienaar =

South African rugby union player

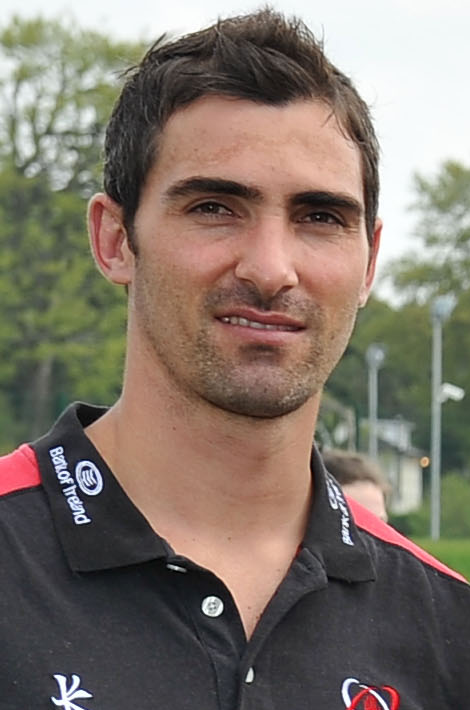
- Ruan Pienaar in 2014
- Born: 10 March 1984 (age 42) Bloemfontein, South Africa
- Height: 1.87 m (6 ft 1 1/2 in)
- Weight: 92 kg (203 lb)
- School: Grey College, Bloemfontein

Rugby union career
- Position: Scrum-half / Fly-half / Fullback
- Current team: Cheetahs / Free State Cheetahs
Senior career
Years	Team	Apps	(Points)
2004–2010	Sharks (Currie Cup)	32	(261)
2005–2010	Sharks	67	(240)
2010–2017	Ulster	141	(877)
2017–2019	Montpellier	28	(161)
2019–2024	Free State Cheetahs	27	(241)
2020–2024	Cheetahs	15	(91)
2021–2022	→ Sharks (loan)	5	(10)
- Correct as of 10 July 2022
International career
Years	Team	Apps	(Points)
2006–2015	South Africa (tests)	88	(135)
2006–2009	South Africa (tour) (Note: In addition to playing in test matches, Pienaar featured in six non-test matches for South Africa. Five of these were international tour matches played between 2006 and 2009, and in 2014 and 2015, he played in matches against a World XV in Cape Town. These matches have an equivalent status to international tour matches, but were played on home soil.)	5	(23)
2014–2015	Springboks	2	(0)
- Correct as of 8 September 2019
Medal record
Men's Rugby union
Representing South Africa
Rugby World Cup
Gold medal – first place	2007 France	Squad
Bronze medal – third place	2015 England	Squad

Ruan Pienaar (born 10 March 1984) is a South African retired rugby union player who played either as a scrum-half or as a fly-half for the Cheetahs, Sharks, Ulster, Montpellier, and the South Africa national team. As of 2024 he is backline and attack coach for the Cheetahs academy.

Pienaar is the son of former Springbok fullback Gysie Pienaar. Ruan is regarded as a very skilful rugby player. Besides being able to pass well, he can kick with both feet, and his vision and running style moved former Springbok coach Jake White to compare him with Australian fly-half Stephen Larkham.

Pienaar has been part of u19 (2003), u21 (2005) and senior Rugby World Cup (2007) winning squads. He also won the Currie Cup in 2008, 2019 and 2023.

== International career ==
Pienaar made his debut for the Springboks in the 2006 Tri-Nations against New Zealand and was a member of the successful 2007 World Cup squad. As he did not play club rugby in South Africa since June 2010 it seemed unlikely that he would be called up again to play for the national team. SARU has a policy of selecting foreign based players in exceptional circumstances only. However, on 20 June 2011 it was reported that Pienaar had been named in South Africa's 49-Man World Cup preliminary training squad.

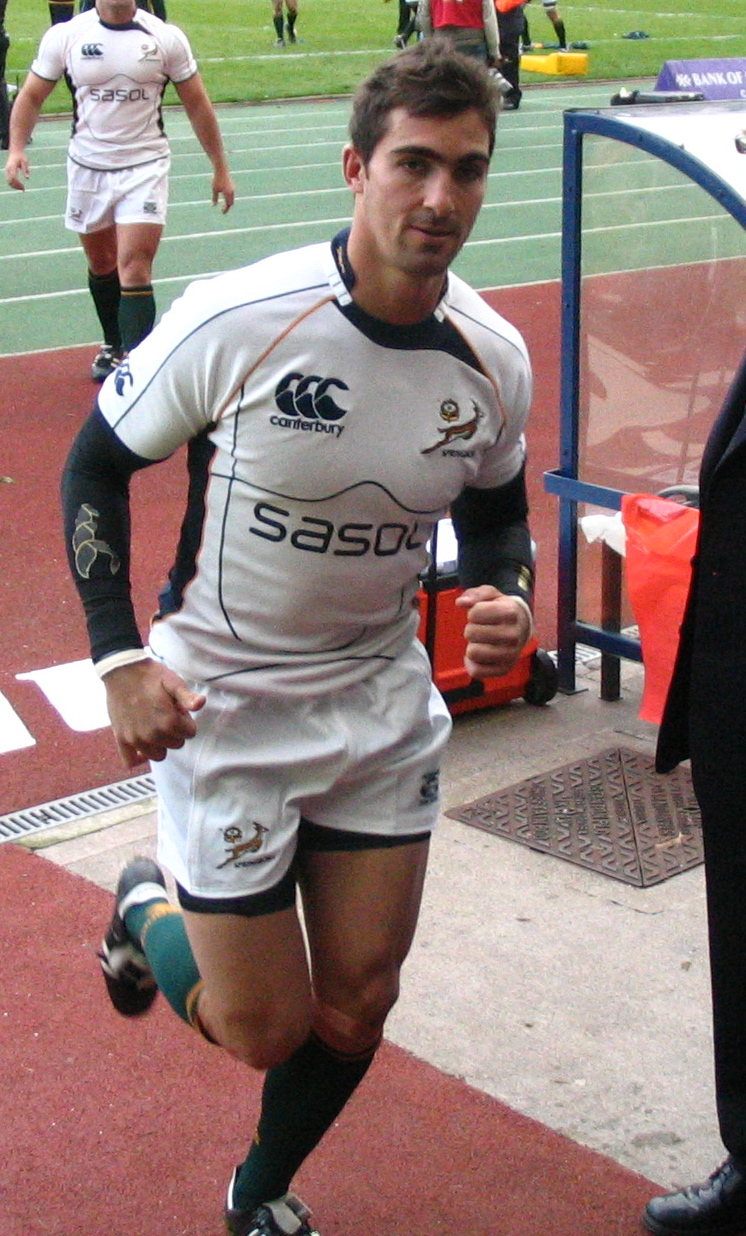
Ruan Pienaar in the Springbok change kit.

== Club career ==
=== South Africa ===
Pienaar played his high school rugby in Bloemfontein, where he attended Grey College. He was selected for the Free State Craven Week side in 2002.

Pienaar played for Sharks in the Currie Cup, the Sharks in Super Rugby prior to joining Ulster.

=== Ulster ===
Ulster announced on 27 May 2010 that they had signed Pienaar on a two-year contract. Pienaar would play in the Celtic League and Heineken Cup along with fellow Springboks Johann Muller, Robbie Diack, Pedrie Wannenburg and BJ Botha at the Belfast based side. He made his Magners League debut on 1 October, scoring all of Ulster's 19 points in their victory over Glasgow Warriors. Pienaar was named at scrum half in the Magners League Team of the Year for the 2010/11 season and also scooped the Magners League player of the Year award which was voted for by his peers.

Pienaar signed a two-year extension to his Ulster contract during this time. Pienaar was again selected at scrum half for the Pro12 Dream Team for the 2011/12 season and was also named captain of the side. In 2012 Pienaar played in the Heineken Cup Final, scoring 9 points in the 42–14 defeat to Leinster. In 2013 he played in the Pro 12 Final, scoring all of Ulster's 18 points in the 24–18 loss to Leinster.

In October 2013 despite strong media reports linking him with Toulon, Pienaar signed a new 3-year extension to his Ulster contract keeping him in Belfast until the end of the 2016/17 season. No further contracts were offered due to the IRFU succession policy, limiting all four of the provinces to one foreign player per position. He left the club as one of its most celebrated players of the professional era.

=== Later career ===
Pienaar played for Montpellier during the 2017/18 season before returning home to South Africa in 2019, signing with Pro14 outfit the Cheetahs where he also played Currie Cup. Prior to the inaugural United Rugby Championship, Pienaar was loaned to the Sharks for the 2021/22 season as part of work carried out to ensure as many of the best South African players were playing for the South African teams in the tournament as possible. He retired from playing in 2024, and joined the Cheetahs' academy as a backline and attack coach.

== Personal life ==
Pienaar is a devout Christian, saying "I have always believed, with my Christianity, that there’s so much more to life than rugby", and "Being here gives me an enormous sense of purpose. I am not just here for rugby, I’m here to touch lives". He is the co-founder of a Bible study group for rugby players in South Africa. While playing for Ulster he regularly attended the Christian Fellowship Church on Belmont Road in Belfast.

He played his final rugby game on Friday, 17 May 2024 when he led the Cheetahs in their game against the Griquas at Shimla Park. It was the 85th time that he captained the Cheetahs.
