= Callum Black =

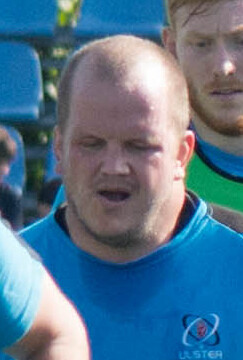
- Born: Callum Black; 25 February 1986 (age 40) Washington D.C., United States
- Height: 1.80 m (5 ft 11 in)
- Weight: 117 kg (18 st 6 lb)

Rugby union career
- Position: Loosehead Prop
Senior career
| Years | Team | Apps | (Points) |
| 2005–2011 | Worcester Warriors | 43 | (10) |
| 2011–2018 | Ulster | 145 | (5) |
| 2018–2021 | Worcester Warriors | 52 | (0) |
- Correct as of 12 August 2023
International career
| Years | Team | Apps | (Points) |
| 2006 | Ireland U21 | | |
| 2014 | Emerging Ireland | 2 | (0) |
- Correct as of 14 May 2018

Callum Black (born 25 February 1986) is an American-born Irish former rugby union player who played loosehead prop for Worcester Warriors and Ulster.

Black was born in Washington, D.C. in the United States, and raised in England where he attended Hartpury College. He joined the Worcester Warriors academy straight from College and joined the senior squad towards the end of the 2008–09 season. He enjoyed loan spells at both Otley and Plymouth during his time with the Worcester Warriors. He joined Ulster for the 2011/12 season. On 8 February 2018, Black re-signed for Worcester Warriors back in the Aviva Premiership from the 2018-19 season.

Black is Irish-qualified through his paternal grandfather, who was originally from Belfast. He represented Ireland at the Under 18, Under 19 and Under 21 levels. He is also eligible to play for the United States, where he was born, and was named to the USA Eagles' roster for the 2018 mid-year tests.

He retired from professional rugby at the end of the 2020-21 season.
