= Paddy Jackson =

Irish rugby union player

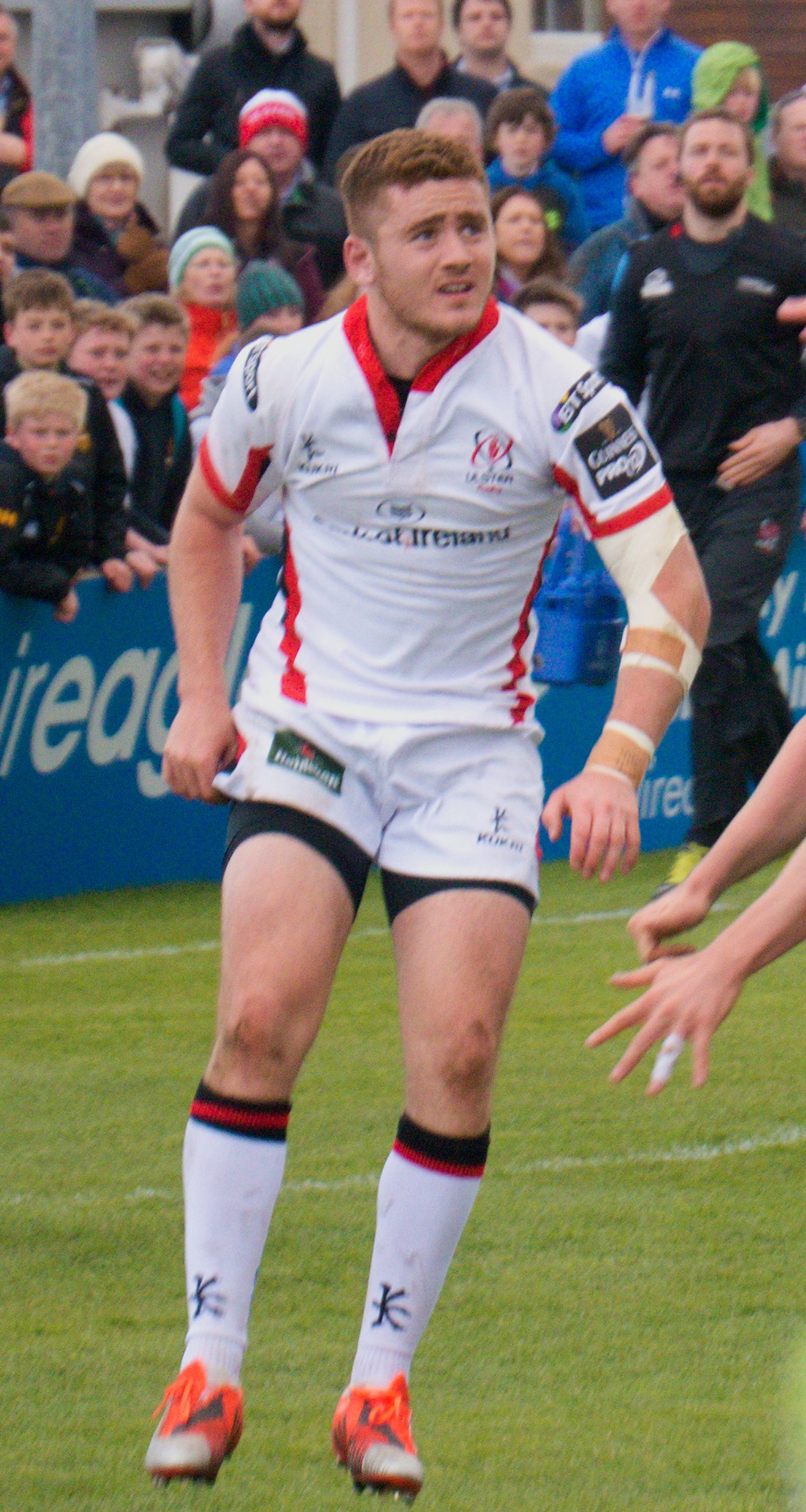
- Paddy Jackson playing for Ulster against Connacht, 2015
- Born: David Patrick Lindsay James Jackson; 5 January 1992 (age 34) Lisburn, Northern Ireland
- Height: 1.78 m (5 ft 10 in)
- Weight: 89 kg (14.0 st; 196 lb)
- School: Methodist College Belfast

Rugby union career
- Position: Fly-half
- Current team: Lyon OU
Amateur team(s)
Years	Team	Apps	(Points)
- Belfast Harlequins
Senior career
Years	Team	Apps	(Points)
2011–2018	Ulster	123	(872)
2018–2019	Perpignan	25	(128)
2019–2023	London Irish	91	(779)
2023–	Lyon OU	32	(202)
- Correct as of 5 June 2021
International career
Years	Team	Apps	(Points)
2010–2011	Ireland U20	15	(118)
2013	Ireland Wolfhounds	1	(5)
2013–2017	Ireland	25	(195)
- Correct as of 16 April 2018

David Patrick Lindsay James "Paddy" Jackson (born 5 January 1992) is a professional rugby union player from Northern Ireland who plays for Lyon OU; in the Top 14, in France. He primarily plays at fly-half and previously played for Irish provincial club Ulster in the Pro12, as well as for French club Perpignan and most recently Gallagher Premiership side London Irish.

Jackson captained the Ireland under-20 team and won 25 senior caps for Ireland between 2013 and 2017.

In 2017 Jackson was charged with rape, and in 2018 he was tried and acquitted. Following the trial and the publication of related derogatory text messages sent by Jackson, the Irish Rugby Football Union revoked his Ireland and Ulster contracts, effectively ending his international career.

== Early life ==
Jackson's family lived in Birmingham for a time but returned to Belfast while Paddy was still of primary school age. He left school with three A-level grades B, C and D, and took a place at the Ulster Academy.

== Club career ==
=== Ulster ===
Jackson came through the Academy at Ulster. He made a surprise debut as the starting outhalf against Scarlets in February 2011. The young playmaker had represented Ireland at a number of levels and was included in the Ireland Junior World Championship squad in 2011.

Jackson primarily played at fly-half but can also play at inside centre. Jackson played arguably his best game against Connacht Rugby in 2012 when he scored a try, a conversion, and three penalties. He earned his place in the Ulster starting lineup including the defeat to Leinster Rugby and then the Heineken Cup 22–19 win over Edinburgh Rugby.

In 2014, Jackson and some teammates found themselves the subject of some controversy when a social media posting by Jackson came to light of them at a party, blacked-up, in slave costumes and holding an Ethiopian flag. Ulster Rugby apologised "unreservedly for any offence" and Jackson removed the post. The Irish Rugby Football Union were also involved in the handling of this incident.

On 14 April 2018, Ulster and the Irish Rugby Football Union (IRFU) revoked Jackson's Ulster and Ireland contracts following his rape trial and acquittal.

=== Perpignan ===
Jackson signed a two-year contract in June 2018 with Perpignan in France, where the French media largely ignored the rape allegations. It is believed he earned €20,000 per month. Jackson and Stuart Olding had been lined with a move to Sale Sharks but the deal fell through after the club raised concerns about the duo's image. He made his league debut against Stade Français Paris in August 2018, scoring a try in a 46-15 points loss. Perpignan finished bottom of the Top 14 in May 2019 and Jackson exercised a clause in his contract allowing him to leave the club if they were relegated.

=== London Irish ===
He signed with London Irish, who had been guided back to the English Premiership for the 2019–20 season by former Ireland head coach Declan Kidney. Jackson had played under London Irish head coach Les Kiss at Ulster.

Before the start of the season, London Irish sponsor, Cash Converters, announced that they were withdrawing sponsorship of the club, and many fans also tweeted that they would boycott the club, using the #IBelieveHer hashtag. This was followed six days later by an announcement by Diageo that they would be withdrawing their Guinness-branded sponsorship from the club as a result of Jackson's signing. They said in a statement "We have met with the club to express our concerns. Their recent decision is not consistent with our values and so we have ended our sponsorship." Diageo and Guinness had sponsored the club for the previous 27 years.

On 6 September 2021, London Irish announced via their website that Jackson would be taking up a leadership role at the club acting as support for captain Matt Rogerson with the assistance of scrum-half teammate Nick Phipps.

=== Lyon OU ===
Following the disbanding of London Irish, Lyon Olympique Universitaire announced that they had signed Paddy Jackson on a 1-year deal, commencing from 1 July 2023. Lyon later confirmed Jackson had extended his contract until 2026.

== International career ==
Jackson captained the Ireland under-20 team. He made his senior debut for Ireland on 24 February 2013, starting against Scotland in the 2013 Six Nations Championship. He has 25 caps for Ireland. His contract with Ireland was revoked by the Irish Rugby Football Union following his rape trial and acquittal.

== Rape and sexual assault case ==
Jackson, along with Stuart Olding, Blane McIlroy, and Rory Harrison, was arrested and questioned about allegations of a rape and sexual assault alleged to have taken place during an after-party at Jackson's home in South Belfast in the early hours of 28 June 2016. In July 2017, they were told by the police that they would face charges in relation to the alleged rape and sexual assault. The trial started in January 2018, with prosecution and defence concluding their cases in late March. On 28 March 2018, after less than 4 hours of deliberation, the jury delivered a unanimous not guilty verdict for all four men (the judge having indicated a unanimous verdict was required).

Following the trial and the release of text messages sent by Jackson to a WhatsApp group, a series of protests and condemnation was levelled at Jackson for leaving the complainant in a distressed way and the sexist and degrading tone of his messages. On 6 April 2018, Jackson acknowledged that the condemnation was "fully justified" and apologised adding "I am also truly sorry for engaging in a WhatsApp group chat which was degrading and offensive and I apologise unreservedly for this."

Jackson's and Olding's contracts were revoked by Ulster Rugby and the IRFU on 14 April 2018, following a review. A statement from the IRFU stated

"In arriving at this decision, the Irish Rugby Football Union and Ulster Rugby acknowledge our responsibility and commitment to the core values of the game: Respect, Inclusivity and Integrity. It has been agreed, as part of this commitment, to conduct an in-depth review of existing structures and educational programmes, within the game in Ireland, to ensure the importance of these core values is clearly understood, supported and practised at every level of the game."

Jackson released a statement, saying "I am deeply disappointed about the outcome of the IRFU and Ulster Rugby's internal review. However, I recognise that my behaviour has fallen far short of the values expected of me as an international player, a role model for the game of rugby and as a son and a brother. I am truly sorry."
