= Stuart Olding =

Rugby union player from Northern Ireland

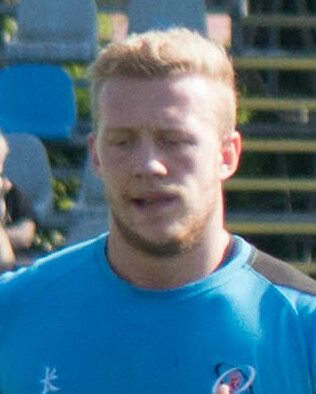
- Stuart Olding, 2016
- Born: Stuart Olding; 11 March 1993 (age 33) Belfast, Northern Ireland
- Height: 1.78 m (5 ft 10 in)
- Weight: 88 kg (13 st 12 lb)
- School: Belfast Royal Academy

Rugby union career
- Position: Centre / Flyhalf
- Current team: Brive
Amateur team(s)
| Years | Team | Apps | (Points) |
- Belfast Harlequins
Senior career
| Years | Team | Apps | (Points) |
| 2011–2018 | Ulster | 62 | (67) |
| 2018– | Brive | 70 | (113) |
- Correct as of 12 March 2017
International career
| Years | Team | Apps | (Points) |
| 2012–2013 | Ireland U20 | 9 | (0) |
| 2013–2016 | Ireland | 4 | (5) |
- Correct as of 30 June 2016

Stuart Olding (born 11 March 1993) is a rugby union rugby player from Northern Ireland. He plays at centre and fullback. Olding played for Ulster from 2011 until 2018. In 2017 Olding was charged with rape, and in 2018 he was tried and acquitted. Following the trial and the publication of related derogatory text messages sent by Olding, his Ireland and Ulster contract was revoked. At international level, he has played for the Ireland U-20 and Ireland teams. In 2018 Olding signed for CA Brive in the Top 14.

== Ulster ==
A versatile back, who can play at out-half, full-back or in the centre, Stuart Olding has represented Ireland at both Under 18 and Under 20 level. He made his debut for Ulster as a substitute against Leinster in December 2011, but just over a year later he established himself as a valued member of the senior squad. He scored his first try for Ulster against Glasgow in February 2013 and scored four in quick succession. Man-of-the-match awards against the Dragons and Connacht soon followed.

== CA Brive ==
In May 2018, Olding signed for French club CA Brive, where the media largely ignored the rape allegations, it is believed he earned nearly €12,000 per month. Olding and Paddy Jackson had been lined with a move to Sale Sharks but the deal fell through after the club raised concerns about the duo's image.

In the 2018/19 season Olding was voted player of the season after being instrumental in helping them get promoted to the Top 14.

== Rape and sexual assault case ==
On 25 July 2017, Olding and fellow Ulster Rugby player Paddy Jackson were accused of rape. Two other men faced charges of intent to pervert the course of justice and exposure with all four men charged together. The case, which was scheduled to last for five weeks, was heard before Judge Patricia Smyth. Initially a jury of nine men and three women were sworn in, subsequently reduced to eleven as one male jury member was discharged on the grounds of ill-health. The trial started in January 2018, with prosecution and defence concluding their cases in late March. On 28 March 2018, after less than 4 hours of deliberation, the jury delivered a unanimous verdict of not guilty.

Olding's and Jackson's contracts were revoked by Ulster Rugby and the IRFU on 14 April 2018, following a review. A statement from the IRFU stated:

"In arriving at this decision, the Irish Rugby Football Union and Ulster Rugby acknowledge our responsibility and commitment to the core values of the game: Respect, Inclusivity and Integrity. It has been agreed, as part of this commitment, to conduct an in-depth review of existing structures and educational programmes, within the game in Ireland, to ensure the importance of these core values is clearly understood, supported and practised at every level of the game."
