= Robbie Diack =

Irish rugby union player

- Born: Robert Diack; 12 November 1985 (age 41) Johannesburg, South Africa
- Height: 1.93 m (6 ft 4 in)
- Weight: 111 kg (17 st 7 lb)
- School: Michaelhouse

Rugby union career
- Position(s): Number 8, Flanker
Senior career
Years	Team	Apps	(Points)
2008–2018	Ulster	205	(90)
- Correct as of 1 January 2018
Provincial / State sides
Years	Team	Apps	(Points)
2006–2008	Western Province	30	(15)
- Correct as of 23 February 2008
Super Rugby
Years	Team	Apps	(Points)
2007–2008	Stormers	16	(5)
- Correct as of 17 May 2008
International career
Years	Team	Apps	(Points)
2013	Emerging Ireland	2	(0)
2014–2015	Ireland Wolfhounds	2	(0)
2014	Ireland	2	(0)
- Correct as of 30 January 2015

Robbie Diack (born 12 November 1985 in Johannesburg, South Africa) is a South African born, Irish former rugby union player who last played for Ulster in the Pro14. He played in the back row mainly as a number eight.

== Career ==
He signed for Ulster at the start of the 2008/2009 season from the South African club The Stormers. He became eligible to play rugby for Ireland in July 2011 after living in Ireland for the required three years. In October 2010 Diack signed a contract keeping him with Ulster until June 2014. In 2017, he became the first person born outside of Ulster to make 200 appearances.

In March 2013, Diack was called up to the Ireland squad for the first time, having been selected for the 35 man training squad for the Six Nations clash with France. He made his full Ireland debut in the victory over Argentina in 2014 at the June Internationals.

Diack played his final game for Ulster in May 2018 against the Ospreys during the European Champions Cup playoff.
