= List of -gate scandals and controversies =

Scandals with the suffix -gate

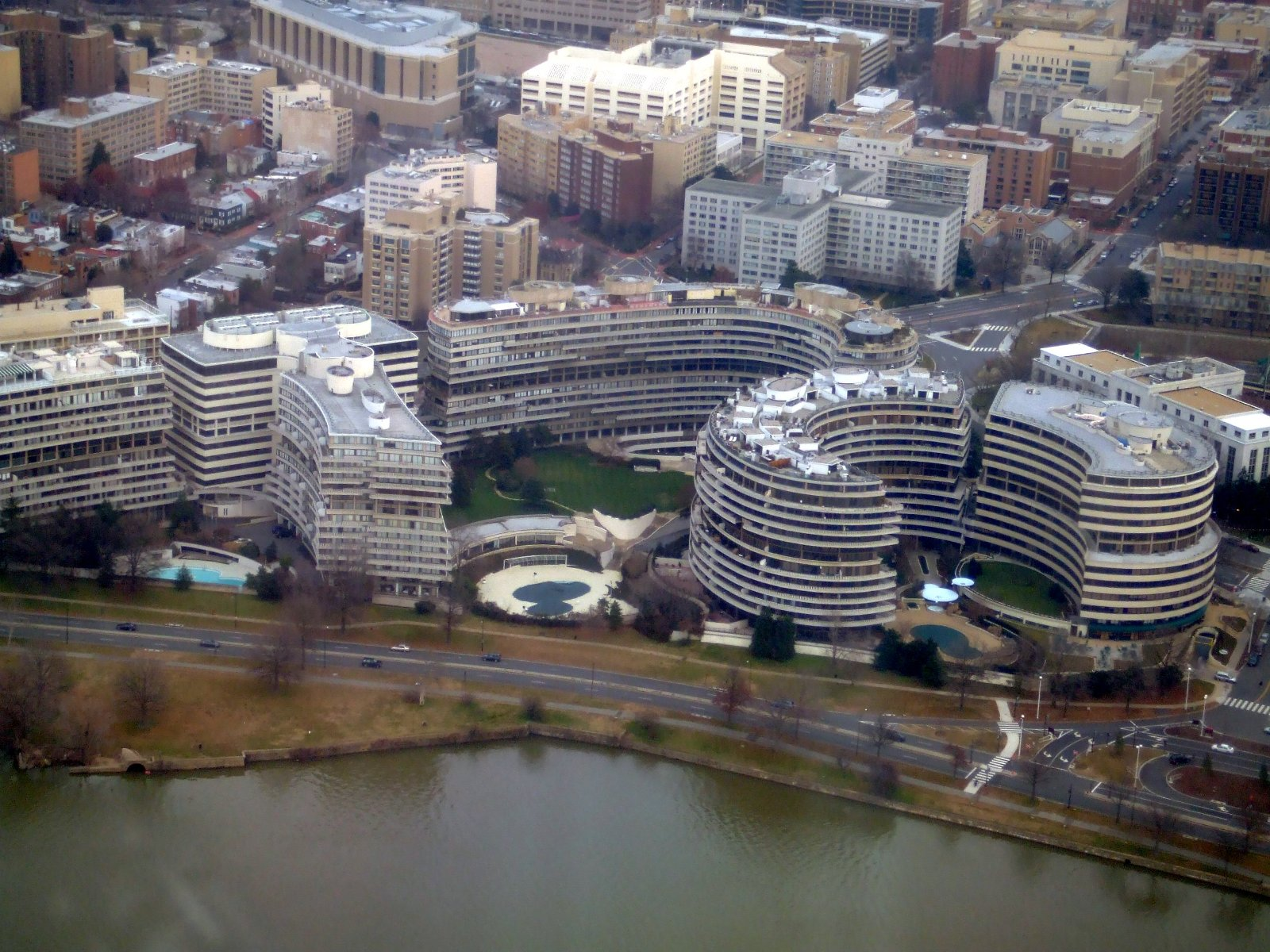
The Watergate complex in Washington, D.C., the inspiration for the -gate suffix following the Watergate scandal

This is a list of scandals or controversies whose names include a -gate suffix, by analogy with the Watergate scandal in the 1970s, as well as other incidents to which the suffix has (often facetiously) been applied. This list also includes controversies that are widely referred to with a -gate suffix, but may be referred to by another more common name (such as the New Orleans Saints bounty scandal, known as "Bountygate"). Use of the -gate suffix has spread beyond American English to many other countries and languages.

== Etymology, usage, and history of -gate ==
The suffix -gate derives from the Watergate scandal in the United States in the early 1970s, which resulted in the resignation of US President Richard Nixon. The scandal was named after the Watergate complex in Washington, D.C., where the burglary giving rise to the scandal took place; the complex itself was named after the "Water Gate" area where symphony orchestra concerts were staged on the Potomac River between 1935 and 1965. The original "gate" scandal got its name from the Watergate Office Building, where two politically motivated burglaries took place in 1972. The Watergate scandal ultimately led to the resignation of US President Richard Nixon on August 9, 1974.

The suffix has become productive as a libfix and is used to embellish a noun or name to suggest the existence of a far-reaching scandal, particularly in politics and government. As a CBC News column noted in 2001, the term may "suggest unethical behavior and a cover-up".

The use of "—gate" served well in an era of sound bites politics. Because they were short and memorable, these phrases caught the attention of the public — and because of its origin [Watergate] it carried a stigma around it, making lesser-known scenarios seem more important.

Such usage has been criticized by some commentators as clichéd and misleading. James Stanyer comments that "revelations are given the 'gate' suffix to add a thin veil of credibility, following 'Watergate', but most bear no resemblance to the painstaking investigation of that particular piece of presidential corruption". Stanyer links the widespread use of -gate to what the sociologist John Thompson calls "scandal syndrome":

[A] self-reproducing and self-reinforcing process, driven on by competitive and combative struggles in the media and political fields and giving rise to more and more scandals which increasingly become the focus of mediated forms of public debate, marginalizing or displacing other issues and producing on occasion a climate of political crisis which can debilitate or even paralyse a government.

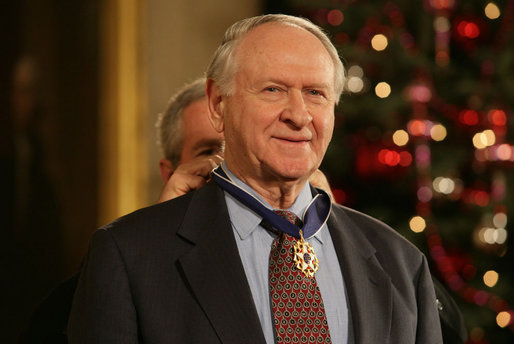
Columnist William Safire popularized the -gate suffix.

The adoption of -gate to suggest the existence of a scandal was promoted by William Safire, the conservative New York Times columnist and former Nixon administration speechwriter. As early as September 1974, he wrote of "Vietgate", a proposed pardon of the Watergate criminals and Vietnam War draft dodgers. Subsequently, he coined numerous -gate terms, including Billygate, Briefingate, Contragate, Deavergate, Debategate, Doublebillingsgate (of which he later said "My best [-gate coinage] was the encapsulation of a minor ... scandal as doublebillingsgate"), Frankiegate, Franklingate, Genschergate, Housegate, Iraqgate, Koreagate, Lancegate, Maggiegate, Nannygate, Raidergate, Scalpgate, Travelgate, Troopergate, and Whitewatergate. The New York magazine suggested that his aim in doing so was "rehabilitating Nixon by relentlessly tarring his successors with the same rhetorical brush – diminished guilt by association". Safire himself later said to author Eric Alterman that he "may have been seeking to minimize the relative importance of the crimes committed by his former boss with this silliness".

The usage has spread into languages other than English; examples of -gate being used to refer to local political scandals have been reported from Argentina, Germany, South Korea, Hungary, Greece and the former Yugoslavia. The term is also used in Mandarin Chinese with the suffix -mén (simplified Chinese: 门; traditional Chinese: 門; lit. 'door', 'gate').

Some commentators have characterized this use of the -gate suffix as a snowclone. But Geoffrey Pullum, the coiner of the term snowclone, considers that it is only a "lexical word-formation analog". Martha Brockenbrough, the founder of The Society for the Promotion of Good Grammar, said that no one should aspire to write with cliches and that although they do help to get a lot of complicated things across in few words, they are not a good way to get people to keep reading what you're writing.

=== Similar phenomena ===
The use of a suffix in this way is not new. -mandering has long been used as a suffix by a politician's name in analogy with gerrymandering ("Henry-mandering" was used in 1852). In recent years, the -gate suffix as a catch-all signifier for scandal has seen some competition from -ghazi, as in "Ballghazi" instead of "Deflategate", or "Bridgeghazi" instead of "Bridgegate". The use of -ghazi is a play on the investigation into the 2012 Benghazi attack, which, despite numerous official investigations into the possibility of government cover-ups, has resulted in no criminal charges or major repercussions for the individuals supposedly involved. -ghazi may be seen as carrying an ironic or self-effacing connotation in its usage, implying that the event described has the appearance and media coverage of a scandal, but does not actually amount to much in a grander sense.

Like the -gate suffix, the Italian -opoli suffix emerged in Italian media from investigations in the 1990s that uncovered a system known as Tangentopoli. The term derives from tangente, which means 'kickback' (e.g., bribery given for public works contracts), and -(o)poli, meaning 'city'. Examples of snowclone-like use of -opoli include Bancopoli (a financial scandal) and Calciopoli (a 2006 Italian football scandal).

== Scandals ==
These scandals have been given the -gate suffix.

=== Arts and entertainment ===
Name	Year	Description	Country	Refs
Belindagate	2003	During a live broadcast of Big Brother Australia 2003, contestant Belinda Thorpe disclosed the identity of her underage sister, who was standing trial for her involvement in the murder of a 31-year-old gay man, provoking widespread public reaction. Speaking while intoxicated, Thorpe also described the circumstances of the killing. As it is illegal in Queensland to identify a minor involved in an active court case, the broadcast was terminated within seconds and remained blank for several hours, although the information had already been aired.	Australia	
Burning Sun gate (Burning Sun scandal)	2019	An entertainment and sex scandal that revolved around the Burning Sun nightclub in Seoul and involved several celebrities, including Korean idols in popular K-pop groups, and police officials.	South Korea	
Celebgate (also known as "The Fappening")	2014	A collection of nearly 500 private photographs of various celebrities, many containing nudity, leaked via iCloud and posted on the imageboard 4chan, and later disseminated by other users on websites and social networks such as Imgur and Reddit.	United States	
Closetgate	2006	The controversy that erupted following the broadcast of the South Park episode "Trapped in the Closet", a satirical parody of the Church of Scientology and some of its famous adherents, such as Tom Cruise.	United States	
Coldplaygate	2025	During a Coldplay concert at Gillette Stadium, the jumbotron cut to two fans holding each other in a loving embrace. However, upon realizing they were being filmed, the pair tried to duck out of view, prompting speculation on social media that they were having an affair. (The pair was later identified as Andy Byron, the married CEO of tech startup Astronomer, and Kristin Cabot, Astronomer's chief people officer.)	United States	
Comicsgate	2018	An alt-right harassment campaign in opposition to what its participants describe as "forced diversity" and progressivism in comic books – including the creators hired, the characters depicted, and the stories told – which they argue has led to a decline in both quality and sales.	North America	
Conformitygate (also "Conformity Gate")	2026	The fan theory that the divisive series finale of Netflix original sci-fi show Stranger Things, which aired on December 31, 2025, was a red herring, and that the "true" series finale would be released on January 7, 2026. The polarizing theory spread quickly through social media, and is sometimes labeled a conspiracy theory. On January 7, the Netflix site reportedly experienced an outage due to increased user traffic. However, no new episodes of Stranger Things were released that day.	Worldwide	
Cuntgate	2018	The outrage on social media that followed when Samantha Bee called Ivanka Trump a "feckless cunt" on her comedy news show, Full Frontal, in the context of the family separation policy under the first Trump administration.	United States	
Cutgate	2025	After the release of the second volume of Stranger Things 5 on December 25, fans theorized that hours of content were cut, and created a public, widely-circulated Google Doc that was soon access-restricted. This raised concerns over the integrity of and possible narrative gaps in the episodes. A Change.org petition calling for the release of "unseen footage" was created by Wennii J., a fan based in New York, and raised over 400,000 signatures. Actor Randy Havens, who portrays Mr. Clarke in the show, was the first to debunk this, saying on December 28, "There's no secret Snyder Cut of the show. Please don't believe everything some random ass tells you on the Internet."	Worldwide	
Derpygate	2012	Controversy surrounding the character of Derpy Hooves from the animated series My Little Pony: Friendship Is Magic. Following the character's speaking debut in the episode "The Last Roundup", criticism emerged regarding her name, appearance and voice, which was interpreted as ableist. Hasbro and The Hub subsequently pulled the episode from iTunes, and released a modified version with the character's voice lines rerecorded, eyes straightened and name removed from dialogue. The decision to modify the episode in turn resulted in further controversy within the brony fandom.	United States and Canada	
Donutgate (also "Doughnutgate")	2015	Singer Ariana Grande was observed on video in Lake Elsinore, California, licking unpurchased doughnuts and stating "I hate Americans. I hate America. That's disgusting." In the aftermath of both police and health department investigations, Grande canceled her headlining performance at the 2015 MLB All-Star Game concert, citing recent oral surgery.	United States	
Doritogate	2012	Two initially unconnected events involving video game journalists Geoff Keighley and Lauren Wainwright are questioned in an article by Robert Florence, triggering a chain of events; 1. Florence's publisher is threatened with legal action, 2. Which led to the subsequent editing of the article, 3. Florence resigning, 4. The unedited version of the article suffering from the Streisand effect, 5. And the video game journalism industry questioning the closeness of game journalists to the companies whose products they cover.		
Driv3rgate	2004	Video game magazines PSM2 and Xbox World gave favorable reviews of Driver 3, a game which received an otherwise lukewarm critical response. Some gamers and journalists accused Atari of having given early access to the game on the condition it would be given favorable ratings.	United Kingdom	
Elevatorgate	2014	The scandal over an altercation between three American musicians: Beyoncé, her husband Jay-Z, and her sister Solange Knowles. The incident occurred as the three left a Met Gala afterparty at The Standard, High Line. Surveillance video shows Knowles physically attacking Jay-Z inside an elevator while Beyoncé stood by. When the video leaked online, it prompted extensive media attention and speculation about the cause of the altercation.	United States	
Elsagate	2014 (Note: Elsagate channels had been known since 2014, but it wasn't until 2017 that it gained media attention.)–present	A scandal and phenomenon referring to thousands of inappropriate YouTube videos deceptively targeted towards young children, often referred to as "content farms". These videos, in order to attract young viewers, originally featured characters from famous cartoons, such as Frozen, Spider-Man, and Peppa Pig, but have since turned to video games and web series, such as Minecraft, Roblox, Among Us, Five Nights at Freddy's, Poppy Playtime, Friday Night Funkin', and The Amazing Digital Circus.	Worldwide	
Envelopegate	2017	At the 89th Academy Awards, the film La La Land was initially announced as the winner of Best Picture. Around two minutes later, when the La La Land producers were giving acceptance speeches, it was declared that the announcement had been made in error, and that Moonlight had actually won Best Picture. It was later revealed the incident was due to the announcer being given the wrong envelope to open.	United States	
Fruitgate	2026	In the Traitors: New Blood season 5, Victor has a theory Joe & Tomica are traitors. He believes they committed a murder in plain sight after seeing them both suspiciously carry fruit around and offer it to other contestants.	United States	
Gamergate	2014	The Gamergate controversy concerns issues of sexism and progressivism in video game culture, stemming from a harassment campaign conducted primarily through the use of the Twitter hashtag #GamerGate.	United States	
Gamergate 2.0	2024	A campaign against narrative design company Sweet Baby Inc. for its perceived "woke agenda" over support for DEI. A Steam group with 100,000 members highlighted video games that Sweet Baby had been involved with, and discouraged people from playing them. A Kotaku reporter was subjected to online harassment after infiltrating and reporting on the group.	United States	
Gerstmanngate	2007	Refers to the controversy following the November 2007 dismissal of Jeff Gerstmann from his position as editorial director of GameSpot. Gerstmann had awarded a Fair rating to the game Kane & Lynch: Dead Men at a time when the game was being heavily advertised on GameSpot, which led to accusations from many games journalists of a lack of editorial integrity on the part of GameSpot, who denied that the review had been a part of the reasoning behind the dismissal. However, a subsequent interview with Gerstmann in 2012 countered this statement, with Gerstmann claiming that, although there was more to his firing than any single review, it would not be untrue to say that the Kane & Lynch episode contributed to it.	United States	
Mandragate	2015	A corruption scandal over programming procurement involving Indonesian comedian Mandra and state-owned television network TVRI.	Indonesia	
Nipplegate (also "Boobgate" or "wardrobe malfunction")	2004	Justin Timberlake exposed Janet Jackson's breast during the halftime show of Super Bowl XXXVIII. The incident sparked mass outrage across America as a result and Jackson being blacklisted in several media events at the time.	United States	
Nudegate (Edison Chen photo scandal)	2008	Intimate photographs of Hong Kong actor Edison Chen were leaked online and widely discussed in Hong Kong media. Called "Nudegate" (simplified Chinese: 艳照门; traditional Chinese: 豔照門; pinyin: Yànzhàomén) in mainland China, using the Chinese character for the word "gate" (simplified Chinese: 门; traditional Chinese: 門; pinyin: mén).	China and Hong Kong	
OST-gate	2015	The OST is an abbreviation of Official Smogon Tournament, a tournament hosted by Pokémon fan-based community website Pokémon Showdown, or Smogon for short. The term was coined during the 2015 season of the OST where former veteran player and Smogon webmaster named Bloo (whose character is based of the titular character from the TV series Foster's Home for Imaginary Friends) created a separate account to orchestrate match fixing, abusing administrator privileges, as well as breaching competition integrity. Throughout investigations and tipoffs from various online allegations relating to coincidence because of both accounts' similar playing patterns, the alternate account was confirmed to be created by, and was used with, Bloo, who later outright admit the misdeed committed due to the player's wishes to retire from Smogon; the alternate account was disqualified prior to the final round of said tournament and a recreation was subsequently held, before both accounts were indefinitely banned from Smogon.	United States	
Pandora Gate	2023	A scandal among Polish influencers which started when YouTubers Sylwester Wardęga and Konopskyy revealed videos depicting abuse by multiple popular Polish influencers toward their viewers. One such influencer, Stuu, wrote lewd messages to a 14-year-old girl. The case was commented on by Polish media and politicians, including Polish prime minister Mateusz Morawiecki and Minister of Justice Zbigniew Ziobro.	Poland	
Pandorogate	2022-ongoing	Italian influencer Chiara Ferragni promoted products promising the proceeds would be donated to charity but instead pocketed them. Ferragni was fined over €1 million and required to pay €3.4 million in restitution. The Ferragni Law was passed in Italy following the scandal to codify penalties against fraud by influencers.	Italy	
Papoosegate	2018	British television host Piers Morgan retweeted and mocked (commenting, Oh 007.. not you as well?!!! and including the hashtag "#emasculatedBond") a photo of English actor Daniel Craig holding his newborn daughter in a papoose while walking down the street. After facing backlash for the tweet (notably from celebrities such as American actor Chris Evans), Morgan attempted to explain it by claiming that "James Bond would never use a papoose to carry his babies".	United Kingdom	
Penisgate	2015	While performing at a concert in Stockholm, singer Lenny Kravitz squatted and his pants split open revealing his penis to concertgoers. Variations of the term have been used to describe other controversies involving Justin Bieber, Olympic skiers, and local school board officials, among others.	Sweden	
Poopgate (Dave Matthews Band bus incident)	2004	A tour bus belonging to the American rock group Dave Matthews Band dumped an estimated 800 pounds (360 kg) of human waste from the bus's blackwater tank through the Kinzie Street Bridge in Chicago onto an open-top passenger sightseeing boat sailing in the Chicago River below.	United States	
Portraitgate (Brian Cowen nude portraits controversy)	2009	Two oil paintings depicting Brian Cowen, Taoiseach of Ireland, in the nude, were briefly displayed in Dublin art galleries in March 2009 as an act of guerrilla art.	Ireland	
Queuegate	2022	Controversy surrounding the accusation that This Morning presenters Phillip Schofield and Holly Willoughby jumped the queue to walk past the coffin of Queen Elizabeth II while she lay in state in Westminster Hall. Schofield and Willoughby's actions were compared to those of other celebrities, such as David Beckham and Susanna Reid, who had queued several hours with the public at Westminster Hall. The scandal prompted the creation of a Change.org petition calling for the presenters to be sacked, which reached 75,000 signatures within a week.	United Kingdom	
Sachsgate (prank calls by The Russell Brand Show; also "Manuelgate")	2008	Comedian Russell Brand and TV presenter Jonathan Ross left a series of obscene voice messages on the answering machine of actor Andrew Sachs during an episode of the BBC Radio 2 show The Russell Brand Show.	United Kingdom	
Slapgate	2022	On March 27, during the live television broadcast of the 94th Academy Awards, actor Will Smith walked onstage and slapped comedian Chris Rock across the face. The incident occurred during Rock's monologue preceding the announcement of Best Documentary Feature Film. Just before, Rock had made a comment about Smith's wife, Jada Pinkett Smith, and her shaved head, which Pinkett Smith has said was due to her alopecia areata. After the slap, Smith returned to his seat, but shouted profanities at Rock at several moments during the rest of the event.	United States	
Snakegate	2016	A controversy involving Taylor Swift, Kanye West, and Kim Kardashian, stemming from a lyric in Kanye West's song "Famous." The term was popularized by Swift's fans to describe the criticism she faced and the subsequent portrayal of her as a "snake" by some online, due to the perceived deception surrounding the lyric.	United States	
Spitgate	2022	A video taken at the 79th Venice International Film Festival premiere of Don't Worry Darling was interpreted by some social media commentators to depict Harry Styles, the film's lead, spitting on co-star Chris Pine. Both Pine and director Olivia Wilde denied this rumor, and Styles later jokingly referenced the alleged incident at a concert.	Italy	
Threshergate	1992	A controversy based around a faked story, claiming that then-British Chancellor Norman Lamont had purchased cigarettes and champagne at a liquor store.	United Kingdom	
Tomatogate	2015	Radio consultant Keith Hill compared women artists in country music to a garnish, saying that male artists were the lettuce in our salad and "the tomatoes of our salad are the females".	United States	
Treegate	2023	On July 11, NBCUniversal illegally pruned trees on public property near Gate 8 of its film studio in Universal City. At the time, Gate 8 was being picketed as part of the actors' and writers' strikes, and the protestors had relied on the trees to shade them from the ongoing heat wave. As such, many believed the trimming was a punitive measure. NBCUniversal representatives denied these claims, calling the pruning an "unintended challenge... for demonstrators". The company was fined US$250 by the City of Los Angeles for destruction of city property and tree law violation.	United States	

=== Journalism and academics ===
Name	Year	Description	Country	Refs
Choppergate	2011	The Nine News Queensland bulletins on August 20 and 21, 2011, included live coverage each night by reporters Melissa Mallet and Cameron Price, respectively, from the station's helicopter, which they claimed was "near Beerwah", where the remains of murdered schoolboy Daniel Morcombe had been found earlier that month. The reports were revealed to be fake when, on the second night, rival station Channel Seven recorded video of the Nine helicopter sitting on the helipad outside their studios at Mount Coot-tha at the time of the broadcast. Radar footage also revealed that, on the first night, the helicopter was actually hovering over Chapel Hill, 70 kilometres (43 mi) away from Beerwah. Both Mallet and Price, as well as news producer Aaron Wakeley, were sacked by the Nine Network following the incident, and news director Lee Anderson accepted responsibility and resigned over the faked reports.	Australia	
Chyrongate	2023	A chyron (lower third) regarding former President Donald Trump's federal arrest ran on Fox News during speeches by both Trump and President Joe Biden reading, "Wannabe dictator speaks at White House after having his political rival arrested". This was criticized by many journalists and the White House itself.	United States	
Climategate	2010	Emails that were hacked remotely from the Climatic Research Unit of the University of East Anglia were publicized by climate change denialists alleging a global warming conspiracy theory: the allegations against climate scientists were subject to eight investigations, which found there was no evidence of fraud or scientific misconduct, though there was a finding of a lack of openness.	United Kingdom	
Elevatorgate	2011	In June 2011, skeptic blogger Rebecca Watson revealed that a stranger followed her into an elevator at 4am as she was leaving the World Atheist Convention and propositioned her. After stating that she found this intrusive, several opponents sent her hate mail including death threats. Further controversy arose when Richard Dawkins wrote a blog post which mocked Watson by comparing her experiences to those of women in Muslim countries.	Ireland	
Facebookgate	2008	In order to promote their university guides, book publisher College Prowler (now rebranded as Niche) created 125 fake "Class of 2013" Facebook groups. After their involvement was exposed, they removed their administrative access from the groups, admitting, "It was clearly over the line."	United States	
Fredo-Gate	2019	A heckler in Shelter Island, New York referred to journalist Chris Cuomo as "Fredo", in reference to a fictional mobster character named Fredo Corleone, from The Godfather film, who was generally associated with emotional weakness and a lack of intelligence. Following Cuomo's profanity-laced tirade against the individual in question, President Donald Trump tweeted about the incident numerous times, criticizing Cuomo's behavior.	United States	
Hackgate (News International phone hacking scandal; also "Rupertgate" or "Murdochgate")	2011	Allegations that the now-defunct News of the World had hacked into the phones of celebrities, politicians, members of the British royal family, and victims of crime.	United Kingdom	
Kategate (also "Photogate")	2024	A scandal involving the release and then retraction of a Mother's Day photo, later claimed to have been doctored by her, by Catherine, Princess of Wales (aka Kate), and her three children.	United Kingdom	
Mediagate (also "Anchorgate")	2012	The controversy over Pakistani top journalists in the mainstream media.	Pakistan	
Rathergate (Killian documents controversy; also "Memogate")	2004	The scandal over a forged memo about George W. Bush's military record that ultimately led to the resignation of Dan Rather as anchor of CBS Evening News.	United States	
Reutersgate	2006	The controversy over Reuters photographer Adnan Hajj manipulating news photos with Photoshop.	Lebanon	
Schlepgate	2025	On August 9, 2025, Schlep, a YouTuber known for conducting sting operations against sexual predators on Roblox was permanently banned from the platform and sent a cease and desist letter by the Roblox Corporation. The ban gained significant media attention and controversy in the Roblox community, with increased criticism towards Roblox's child safety policies.	United States	
Suzygate or Suzyscam	1988	James Revson, a rival gossip columnist at Newsday, accused Suzy Knickerbocker of fabricating some of the content of her columns. He alleged that she had reported on parties which she had not attended, instead writing from press releases and guest lists.	United States	
Ubergate	2018	The controversy surrounding Karl Stefanovic and a phone call he had in the back of an Uber, complaining about his job as a journalist. The incident led to his resignation on Australia's Today show.	Australia	

=== Politics ===
Name	Year	Description	Refs
Abu Ghraibgate	2004	The torture and abuse of inmates at Abu Ghraib prison in Iraq.	
Agrogate (Agrokomerc Affair)	1987	Widespread economic and political corruption in the Socialist Federal Republic of Yugoslavia was exposed as its economy collapsed, contributing to its disintegration in 1991.	
Angolagate (Mitterrand–Pasqua affair)	2008	Arms sales to the Government of Angola by the Government of France between 1993 and 2000.	
Baligate (Bank Bali scandal)	1999	Golkar Party officials colluded with the Indonesian Bank Restructuring Agency (IBRA) to coerce Bank Bali (now Permata Bank) chief Rudy Ramli to pay an illegal commission of Rp 526 billion (then equivalent to about US$80 million) to private company Era Giat Prima in order to collect Rp 904.6 billion owed by two banks taken over by IBRA.	
Bananagate	1974	The United Brands Company paid a $1.25 million bribe to Honduran President Oswaldo López Arellano, followed by another $1.25 million the next year to have a tax reduced from fifty cents to twenty-five cents per box of bananas. When the bribe was revealed, it provoked the overthrow of the military government in Honduras and this in turn led to the nationalisation of United's railways along with a major divestiture of land by the companies.	
Beachgate	2017	Chris Christie, the then-Governor of New Jersey, visited a state-owned beach house with his family amid a statewide government shutdown that closed such beaches to the public. The family was depicted lounging in the sun in airplane photographs taken by the state's largest newspaper, The Star-Ledger. Christie subsequently defended his actions.	
Beergate	2022	Labour Party leader Keir Starmer was accused of breaching British COVID-19 regulations while campaigning in Durham in 2021, as pictures circulated of him drinking with colleagues indoors. Critics accused Starmer of hypocrisy, given his harsh criticisms of Boris Johnson's actions during Partygate. On 9 May, Starmer announced he would resign as opposition leader if found to have broken COVID-19 regulations, as did his deputy Angela Rayner. Durham police later cleared Starmer and Rayner of any wrongdoing.	
Bibigate (1)	1993	Benjamin Netanyahu admitted to having an extramarital affair.	
Bibigate (2)	1997	It was alleged that Netanyahu had chosen Roni Bar-On as attorney-general to please Aryeh Deri, who was being prosecuted in a corruption trial.	
Bigotgate	2010	UK Prime Minister Gordon Brown accidentally recorded calling a party supporter a bigot after a woman challenged him while he was campaigning in Rochdale during the run-up to the 2010 UK general Election.	
Billygate	1980	US President Jimmy Carter's brother, Billy Carter, legally represented the Libyan government as a foreign agent.	
Bingogate	1999	A scandal that occurred during the administration of Premier of British Columbia Mike Harcourt, involving the skimming of charity funds for use by the ruling NDP by former MLA Dave Stupich (Harcourt was not involved but did resign).	
Biscuitgate	2017	A scandal in Mauritius involving the alleged abuse of power by the speaker of parliament's daughter to sell biscuits to government departments at inflated prices.	
Blabbergate	2017	US President Donald Trump allegedly revealed highly classified information to Russia's Foreign Minister and Ambassador, boasting, "I get great intel. I have people brief me on great intel every day." Trump seemingly confirmed the scandal in a tweet.	
Bleachgate	2020	US President Donald Trump suggesting drinking bleach to cure COVID-19.	
Blobbygate	1994	Lancaster City Council spent £300,000 of taxpayer's money on a Crinkley Bottom theme park which only stayed open for 13 weeks. The overall cost to the taxpayer was £2.6 million. It was known as "Blobbygate" due to the Mr Blobby character who was the main character of the park.	
Bonusgate	2008	Pennsylvania scandal involving the alleged use of government funds to finance partisan political campaigns.	
Bridgegate	2013	Allegations New Jersey Governor Chris Christie's administration ordered lane closures from Fort Lee, New Jersey, to the George Washington Bridge because the Fort Lee mayor did not endorse his reelection.	
Brothelgate	2010	The series of events that led to the resignation of the Irish Minister of Defence Willie O'Dea.	
Buloggate and Bruneigate	2003	Two related cases that lead to Indonesian President Abdurrahman Wahid's impeachment: Buloggate: Wahid wanted to lend some funds from Yanatera Bulog for development in Aceh, however the $4 million fund was abused by someone who profited from Wahid's name and Wahid asked for fund lending without DPR/Senate consent; Bruneigate: Brunei sultan donates for Aceh without any notification nor consent.	
Cablegate	2010	In November 2010, WikiLeaks began to release American diplomatic cables from a trove of over 250,000.	
Calendargate	2023–2024	The controversy over a promotional 2024 calendar released by Ultra Right Beer that featured young American female conservative activists and commentators in pin-up poses, some of them minimally dressed, to disparage trans women. The calendar was widely criticized by social and Christian conservatives as indecorous and contrary to the movement's values, while being embraced and defended by libertarians.	
Cashgate	2014	The plundering of Malawian government funds by government officials in 2013.	
CatalanGate	2022	A scandal involving accusations of espionage by the Spanish Government using the NSO Group's Pegasus spyware against figures of the Catalan independence movement after the Procés.	
Cheriegate	2002	A political scandal over the purchase of two flats in Bristol by Cherie Blair with the alleged assistance of Peter Foster, a convicted Australian conman and boyfriend of Blair's friend Carole Caplin.	
Choi Soon-sil gate	2016	South Korean scandal involving Choi Soon-sil's influence over president Park Geun-hye.	
Choppergate (India)	2013	An Indian parliamentary investigation into allegations of bribery and corruption involving several senior officials and helicopter manufacturer AgustaWestland surrounding the purchase of a new fleet of helicopters.	
Choppergate (Australia)	2014	An Australian political scandal involving Speaker of the Australian House of Representatives, Bronwyn Bishop flying from Melbourne to a party fundraiser in Geelong in November 2014, at a cost of AUD$5227.	
Chifagate	2025-2026	A political scandal in Peru involving interim president José Jerí, who was caught holding clandestine meetings with Chinese businessmen at a chifa restaurant and a market in Lima's Barrio Chino. The scandal, combined with allegations of irregular hiring, led to Jerí's impeachment and removal from office after only four months in power.	
Chinagate	1996	Refers to the allegations of Chinese interference in the 1996 United States elections, and the possible collusion between Beijing and the Clinton presidential campaign, and the subsequent presidency.	
Civangate	1994	Allegations of involvement by the Özal family on the shooting of Engin Civan, former head of the Emlak Bank, which was organized by mob leader Alaattin Çakıcı	
Clonegate	2020	Russian president Vladimir Putin has been accused of having clones. Proponents say that his extremely different appearance is a giveaway; however, this hoax has been disproven, as this appearance change is easily explained with Botox use and facelifts.	
Coingate	2005	The mishandling of Ohio government funds entrusted to Ohio Republican Party operatives, involving rare coin funds	
Coalgate	2014	The mishandling of coal field auctions by the Indian government under the UPA-1. The alleged loss was $37 billion.	
Cokegate	2023	On July 2, 2023, the United States Secret Service found a small plastic bag containing powder cocaine inside the White House.	
Corngate	2002	A political scandal in New Zealand in 2002, which involved the suspected release of genetically modified corn seed in 2000.	
Cryptogate	2025	Controversy following Argentine President Javier Milei's promotion of the cryptocurrency $LIBRA on social media which subsequently suffered a severe price crash.	
Dasukigate	2015	The scandal surrounding the diversion of funds intended for purchase of arms and armaments for the Nigerian Army in its counter-insurgency war with Boko Haram to things like paying for Sambo Dasuki's purchase of real estate property in Dubai and paying a friend's private hospital complex for "offering prayers" for the success of President Goodluck Jonathan's re-election bid.	
Debategate	1980	A political scandal in the United States involving the suspicious acquisition of debate preparation documents.	
Donnygate	1990s	A political scandal involving expenses fraud by councillors in Doncaster, United Kingdom.	
Dildogate	2016	Protest action against the Trans-Pacific Partnership where a protester flung a rubber dildo at MP Steven Joyce, striking him in the face. Also known as the Waitangi dildo incident.	
Dissertation-gate	2019	Controversy surrounding the authenticity of Taiwanese President Tsai Ing-wen's 1984 doctorate earned at the London School of Economics. (See Chinese article: zh)	
Duna-gate	1990	A political scandal in Hungary in 1990, with the communist regime's secret service illegally collecting information on opposition parties.	
Elbowgate	2016	Canadian Prime Minister Justin Trudeau accidentally elbowed a female MP in the chest in the House of Commons, causing the opposition to accuse him of assaulting her.	
Emailgate	2015	During her tenure as United States Secretary of State, Hillary Clinton drew controversy by using a private email server for official public communications rather than using official State Department email accounts maintained on federal servers. Clinton's server was found to hold over 100 emails containing classified information, including 65 emails deemed "Secret" and 22 deemed "Top Secret". An additional 2,093 emails not marked classified were retroactively designated confidential by the State Department. The controversy was a major point of discussion and contention during the 2016 presidential election, in which Clinton was the Democratic nominee. In July, FBI director James Comey announced that the FBI investigation had concluded that Clinton had been "extremely careless" but recommended that no charges be filed because Clinton did not act with criminal intent, the historical standard for pursuing prosecution. Clinton claimed that her use complied with federal laws and State Department regulations, and that former secretaries of state had also maintained personal email accounts (however Clinton was the only secretary of state to use a private server). Unlike the official system, which was hacked by the Russians, her private system was never hacked.	
Erdogate	2016	After the publication of a satirical comedy sketch by Jan Böhmermann and Neo Magazin Royale, Turkish president Recep Tayyip Erdoğan filed several lawsuits against the comedian, which led the Bundestag to decide to discard the antiquated law §103.	
Faceliftgate	2017	Controversy surrounding two Donald Trump tweets criticizing Morning Joe hosts Mika Brzezinski and Joe Scarborough. Together, the tweets read "I heard poorly rated @Morning_Joe speaks badly of me (don't watch anymore). Then how come low I.Q. Crazy Mika, along with Psycho Joe, came... to Mar-a-Lago 3 nights in a row around New Year's Eve, and insisted on joining me. She was bleeding badly from a face-lift. I said no!"	
Fallagate	2007	Political scandal in Guernsey over an attempt to avoid a political conflict of interest over a hospital extension plan.	
Fajitagate	2002	In November 2002, three off-duty San Francisco police officers allegedly assaulted two civilians over a bag of steak fajitas (which were mistaken as drugs), leading to the retirement of the chief of police and the firing of his successor.	
Fangate	2014	In a 2014 Florida gubernatorial election debate Governor Rick Scott did not take the stage for seven minutes after learning that his Democratic opponent, former Governor Charlie Crist, had a small electric fan underneath his lectern, which Scott's campaign and debate organizers stated was against the agreed rules. Scott was subsequently criticized for nearly derailing a debate over a trivial issue.	
Farmgate	2022	In February 2020 US$4 million was stolen from South African president Cyril Ramaphosa's private game farm. The theft was not reported and only became public in June 2022 following the lodging of an official criminal complaint against the president by the controversial former head of the State Security Agency Arthur Fraser. The incident raised a number of questions about why the theft was not reported, why Fraser only reported it two years later, and what impact it might have on future South African politics.	
Fartgate (Canada)	2016	In a speech at the Canadian House of Commons made by Michelle Rempel Garner, the MP for Calgary Nose Hill, Alberta, about jobs in her province, Rempel asked, "Why does this government treat Alberta like a fart in the room that nobody wants to talk about or acknowledge?" The member of Parliament for Saanich—Gulf Islands and leader of the Canadian Green Party, Elizabeth May, stood up and described Rempel's use of the word "fart" as "unparliamentary". May requested for Rempel to withdraw the word "fart", which Rempel refused to do. The crowd watching the House of Commons proceeded to heckle May.	
Fergiegate	2010	Videotape of a conversation between Sarah, Duchess of York and Mazher Mahmood in which she is offered £500,000 in return for access to her ex-husband.	
Filegate	1998	The illegal possession and scrutiny of 300–900 FBI files by the Clinton Administration without the file subjects' permission.	
Floodgate	2025	Series of allegations of corruption, mismanagement, and irregularities in the flood control projects in the Philippines during and before the administration of President Bongbong Marcos.	
Fridgegate	2019	After refusing to be interviewed a number of times in the 2019 election campaign UK Prime Minister Boris Johnson hid in a fridge to avoid being interviewed by Good Morning Britain. Reporter Jonathan Swain attempted to ask Johnson for an interview live on TV while he was campaigning in Pudsey, Yorkshire. In the brief encounter a Johnson aide can be heard saying "oh for fuck's sake" before Johnson disappears into a fridge at Modern Milkman. He did not return for the interview. The event was coined 'fridgegate' with a number of memes being created and the tag '#fridgegate' trending on Twitter.	
Frockgate	2024	Recently elected British Prime Minister Keir Starmer accepted valuable gifts which he initially failed to declare.	
Gaetzgate	2021	US politician Matt Gaetz was placed under investigation concerning sex-trafficking and a potential sexual relationship with a minor. The investigation later expanded to include allegations that Gaetz accepted gifts from marijuana investors, including travel and paid escorts, in exchange for pay-for-play legislation favorable to the investors, and sought to secure government jobs for some of the escorts involved.	
Gaiagate	2014	Ruinous spending on Vila Nova de Gaia (Portugal) city hall–owned companies and waste disposal concession contracts by former mayor Luís Filipe Menezes and his cronies.	
Garglegate	2010	A radio interview given by Taoiseach Brian Cowen in September 2010, in which many commentators said he appeared to be suffering from a hangover.	
Gategate or plebgate	2012	UK political row, when Conservative MP Andrew Mitchell allegedly called a policeman a "pleb", after he was asked to use another gate to leave Downing Street on his bicycle. Mitchell denied using the word pleb; however, he resigned as Chief Whip of the Conservatives amid the media furor over the alleged comments. Reports later emerged which called the legitimacy of the officers' claims into question and a PC was eventually jailed for his involvement in the incident.	
Ghaligate	2021	A diplomatic crisis between Morocco and Spain following the admission of Polisario Front leader Brahim Ghali to a Spanish hospital.	
Gloriagate (also known as the Hello Garci scandal)	2005	An electoral scandal in the Philippines involving leaked telephone conversations between President Gloria Macapagal Arroyo and a member of the Commission on Elections (COMELEC), with both allegedly conspiring to rig the results of the 2004 presidential election in Arroyo's favor.	
Golfgate	2020	A number of Irish TDs and senators and former TDs and senators including Fine Gael EU Commissioner Phil Hogan, Fianna Fáil TD and Minister for Agriculture, Food and the Marine, Dara Calleary, Galway TD Noel Grealish, and others attended the Oireachtas golf society dinner in Clifden, Galway to celebrate its 50th anniversary in direct breach of COVID-19 social distancing measures where the limit of individuals in a contained space was set by the Dáil with no more than 50 attendees while the event itself had 82 attendees.	
Gombakgate	2025	Volunteers for the People's Action Party (PAP) and Progress Singapore Party (PSP) engaged in altercations at Bukit Gombak, Singapore, on 4 January, in the leadup to the 2025 general election held on 3 May. The term was coined by PSP's Hazel Poa during her rally on 1 May. PSP also demanded a request for probe findings prior to Polling Day. Police investigations ended on 29 August; the police declined to publicly disclose their findings and no action was taken.	
Grangegate	2014	A political scandal involving former New South Wales Premier Barry O'Farrell and a $3,000 bottle of Penfolds Grange.	
Greek Watergate	2022	Shortly after he took office in 2019, Greek Prime minister Kyriakos Mitsotakis allegedly ordered the Greek intelligence services to have the phones of his political opponents tapped to secretly monitor their calls and texts. These allegations came to light in 2022 after Nikos Androulakis revealed there was an attempt to hack his phone with the Predator spyware. This particular scandal is called "-Watergate" instead of "-gate" because of similarities with the original Watergate scandal including the direct involvement of the most important politician in the country, the wiretapping of the politician's opponents, the scandal's domination of the national news media and the widespread coverage in the international media (with corresponding damage with the government's reputation abroad).	
Gropegate (United States)	2003	Refers to the allegations of groping and sexual misconduct against actor and former California governor Arnold Schwarzenegger during his campaign in the 2003 California gubernatorial recall election.	
Gropegate (Canada)	2018	The name for the accusation of groping in 2000 by former journalist Rose Knight against Canadian prime minister Justin Trudeau. Knight released a public statement asserting she refused to involve herself with publicity or any pursuits of repercussions.	
Grubgate	2024	An uproar in which Mayra Flores used photos of food from social media and posted to the social media of her political campaign with captions suggesting that she cooked the food in the photos.	
Gulargate	2013	A political corruption scandal in Azerbaijan involving MP Gular Ahmadova.	
Guptagate	2013	A political scandal involving South African President Jacob Zuma and the illegal landing of a planeload of guests at the Gupta family's wedding at Waterkloof Air Force Base in South Africa.	
Hailgate	2016	Scandal following leaked footage of the Nazi salute used by attendees of a white nationalist conference organized by Richard B. Spencer.	
Hairgate	1993	Unsubstantiated allegations surrounding a haircut given to US President Bill Clinton.	
Handshakegate	2025	An event when Syria's de facto leader Ahmed al-Sharaa failed to shake German foreign minister Annalena Baerbock's hand while shaking the French foreign minister's.	
Hawaiigate	2016	Outrage in Thailand over Defence Minister Prawit Wongsuwon's 20.9-million-baht chartered flight to an ASEAN-US defence meeting in Hawaii.	
Hondurasgate	2026	A scandal involving alleged leaked audio recordings which show the United States, Israel, Javier Milei and former Honduran president Juan Orlando Hernandez organizing a disinformation campaign across South America.	
Ibizagate	2019	A scandal featuring senior members of Austria's far-right FPÖ party in a sting operation that happened on the island of Ibiza, involving them offering government contracts to alleged Russian backers in return for favorable coverage in the country's press. This caused the First Kurz government of ÖVP and FPÖ parties to collapse.	
Iraqgate	2003	A Finnish scandal involving the leaking of secret documents to Anneli Jäätteenmäki, which helped bring down Paavo Lipponen's government. Later, it also brought down Jäätteenmäki's government.	
Irangate or Contragate (also referred to as the Iran–Contra affair)	1980s	The Reagan Administration sold weapons to Iran and diverted the proceeds to the Contras in Nicaragua.	
Irisgate	2010	UK political scandal involving an affair by Northern Ireland MLA Iris Robinson, wife of First Minister Peter Robinson.	
Jurmalgate (Latvian: Jūrmalgeita)	2005	Political scandal in Latvia that involved several businessmen and politicians offering a bribe to a deputy of Jurmala City Council in an attempt to sway the 2005 mayoral elections.	
Kazakhgate	2005	Scandal surrounding James Giffen, an American businessman and former advisor of Kazakhstani president Nursultan Nazarbayev, who paid US$78 million in bribes to high-level Kazakhstani officials to secure the oil contracts for Western companies in the 1990s.	
Koreagate	1976	An American scandal involving South Korean influence peddling in the US Congress. This was the first scandal after Watergate to receive the -gate suffix.	
LadyRussiagate	2022	A South African scandal involving the secretive docking of a sanctioned Russian cargo ship carrying military cargo at a naval base in South Africa. The United States accused South Africa of selling arms to Russia that would be used in its war with Ukraine resulting in the damaging of South African-USA bilateral relations.	
Leakgate	2015	An Indian scandal involving the theft and sale of government documents	
Lecterngate or Podiumgate	2023	Arkansas governor Sarah Huckabee Sanders' office purchased a replica of the Presidential Falcon lectern and road case using a state-issued credit card for $19,029.25, which was reimbursed by the Republican Party of Arkansas. Public record requests revealed the purchase to the public, and it was criticised for alleged waste and potential wrongdoing. The Arkansas General Assembly opened an audit.	
Lettergate	2022	Then Prime minister of Pakistan Imran Khan and his government allege that the United States government threatened Pakistan with 'consequences' if the vote of no-confidence were to fail and Khan was to remain in office, and that 'all would be forgiven' if Khan were removed. White House Communications Director Kate Bedingfield replied to this by saying "there is absolutely no truth to that allegation".	
Liquorgate	2022	Irrelevant licensing, extensions and inviting private firms and businessmen into liquor sector, shutting away government power and grip over the retail liquor sector in New Delhi.	
Lunaticgate	2016	During the 2016 Labour Party leadership election campaign, leadership challenger Owen Smith, in a speech to party members in Hammersmith on August 23, said "What you won't get from me is some lunatic at the top of the Labour Party", commenting about incumbent Leader Jeremy Corbyn and sparking outrage from many. Though Smith later admitted that he needed to be "slightly less colourful" with his choice of language, he said that his comment was not referring to Corbyn.	
Macacagate	2006	During George Allen's reelection campaign for the 2006 United States Senate election in Virginia in August, Allen referred to his opponent's aide S. R. Sidarth, who had been following him to all of his campaign stops, as a "macaca", a racial slur. Footage of this spread on YouTube and through blogs and emails, partially causing Allen's election loss from the negative publicity.	
Mammygate	2008	Gloria Squitiro, wife of Kansas City Mayor Mark Funkhouser, allegedly called one of her secretaries "mammy". The secretary, Ruth Bates, who is black, sued the city council for discrimination. The case was settled in 2009.	
Marocgate (also "Moroccogate")	2022	A bribery scandal involving Morocco and several members of the European Parliament, closely linked to the Qatargate scandal. The allegations involve Morocco offering gifts and luxurious holidays worth up to €100,000 to influence votes and secure support for Morocco's claims over Western Sahara.	
Mehrangate	1990s	In which senior Army and ISI (Maj. General Asad Durrani, under the direction of COAS Aslam Beg) officials had withdrawn large sums of money from Mehran Bank Limited (MBL) and Habib Bank Limited (HBL) to be used in an 'intelligence fund' to fund the electoral opponents of Benazir Bhutto and the PPP (the IJI and Nawaz Sharif) before the 1990 general elections. some Rs. 499 million was distributed to various politician and used to "topple" the provincial government in NWFP. The operation had the support of then President Ghulam Ishaq Khan and caretaker Prime Minister Ghulam Mustafa Jatoi, while Yunus Habib of HBL was involved. Those who received money included Nawaz Sharif, Lt.-Gen. Rafaqat (of the Presidents election cell), Ghulam Mustafa Jatoi, Abdul Hafeez Pirzada, Pir Pagaro, Muhammad Khan Junejo, Jam Sadiq Ali, Altaf Hussain, (Note: Yusuf Haroon. Rs. 5 million was received on his behalf rather than direct deposit to Altaf Hussain.) etc. This was revealed following the collapse of Mehran Bank and a case registered by retired Air Marshal Asghar Khan, when neither Aslam Beg or Asad Durrani continued to hold office.	
Memogate (2)	2011	Controversy surrounding an alleged Pakistani memo seeking the help of the Obama administration in the wake of the Osama bin Laden raid to prevent a military takeover in Pakistan.	
Merriongate	2021	Similar to the Golfgate scandal in 2020, former Minister for Children Katherine Zappone hosted an outdoor gathering on 21 July 2021 for 50 guests, including Tánaiste Leo Varadkar, at the Merrion Hotel in Dublin during the COVID-19 pandemic in Ireland, six days prior to her controversial appointment as an "UN special envoy" which was proposed by Simon Coveney. This resulted in widespread anger among opposition TDs. Ultimately Zappone declined to take up the envoy role, which subsequently led to a motion of no confidence against Coveney for his handling of the affair.	
Minkgate	2020	The slaughter of all mink in Denmark under orders of Prime Minister Mette Frederiksen that were later revealed to have no legal basis, leading to snap elections following threats of a no-confidence vote.	
Monicagate, Lewinskygate, Tailgate, or Sexgate ("Zippergate", "the Lewinsky scandal")	1990s	Named after Monica Lewinsky, who had an "inappropriate relationship" with the then-US President Bill Clinton.	
Muldergate	1979	South African political scandal in which funds were clandestinely diverted by defence minister Connie Mulder for overseas propaganda in support of the apartheid regime. The scandal brought about the downfall of Prime Minister BJ Vorster.	
Namagate	2015	A Northern Irish political and financial scandal in which the First Minister of Northern Ireland allegedly stood to benefit from the sale of a portfolio of loans and properties by the National Asset Management Agency.	
Nannygate (1)	1993	A political controversy in the United States wherein the nomination of Zoë Baird and near-nomination of Kimba Wood for US Attorney General were withdrawn due to the hiring of illegal aliens as nannies or the failure to pay taxes for them.	
Nannygate (2)	2006	Swedish scandal over the non-payment of employment taxes of nannies and obligatory television fees by members of the Reinfeldt cabinet.	
Nenegate	2015	A political controversy in South Africa following the firing of Nhlanhla Nene as Minister of Finance by then president Jacob Zuma resulting in large scale capital flight from the country.	
NISgate	2013	South Korean National Intelligence Service manipulated public opinion to promote the ruling party and Park Geun-hye.	
Nkandlagate (1)	2009	South African political scandal brought to light in 2009 by the Mail & Guardian regarding a multimillion-rand state-funded private home of President Jacob Zuma. The story became more sensitive after the release of the public protector Thuli Madonsela's report titled "Secure in comfort". The scandal drove the opposition to initiate impeachment proceedings against Zuma.	
NKF-gate	2004-05	Singaporean non-profit organization, National Kidney Foundation, faced a financial scandal over alleged financial mispractices and misuse of funds by its then-CEO T. T. Durai, who he rose to prominence in July 2005 when he sued Singapore Press Holdings for defamation when a news tabloid surfaced back in March 2004, including one where a contractor was hired to install a gold and chrome-plated faucet; further investigations in the ensuing lawsuit, led by then-Health minister Khaw Boon Wan, reveal the confirmation of the scandals, resulting in Durai's arrest and Gerard Ee appointed as chairman. Additional scrutiny and transparency relating to the accounting for donations has since enforced by the government following the scandal; the scandal also become a flashpoint topic in that following year's election when Singapore Democratic Party was also sued by the government after the release of the party's newsletter The New Democrat. In 2011, Durai revealed that he have paid around S$4.05 million of the money back to NKF.	
Nokiagate	2022	In May 2022, the Dutch state attorney revealed in a courtcase that Prime Minister Mark Rutte daily deleted all the text messages on his archaic Nokia mobile phone, which those he deemed important being forwarded or dictated to civil servants. This was referred to as "real-time archiving". The phone purportedly only had memory space for twenty messages. According to the Council of State, text messages are required by law to be stored to allow officials to be held accountable by the public. Rutte denied withholding information or breaking the law. Experts and opposition parties were critical. A motion of no confidence failed.	
Nueragate	2015	Chilean president Michelle Bachelet was accused of giving advantageous business deals and credits to her daughter-in-law ("nuera" in Spanish) through a position that her son also held in the government.	
Nukegate	2017	A political and legal scandal which arose from the abandonment of the Virgil C. Summer nuclear expansion project in South Carolina by South Carolina Electric & Gas (a subsidiary of SCANA) and the South Carolina Public Service Authority (known as Santee Cooper) in 2017. It was the largest business failure in the history of South Carolina and resulted in criminal charges.	
Officegate	2001	Scotland's First Minister Henry McLeish resigned after it was revealed that while he was a Westminster MP between 1987 and 1998 (before the advent of devolution), he sublet his constituency office in Glenrothes, Fife, but failed to ensure that it was registered or that the party issued funds from the income to the House of Commons.	
Oniongate	2015	Australian Prime Minister Tony Abbott was filmed biting into a whole onion, seemingly including its skin.	
Paksogate (Lithuanian: Paksogeitas)	2003	A political scandal over President of Lithuania Rolandas Paksas, who violated the presidential oath, which resulted in impeachement.	
Palmargate	2003	The Minister of Housing and Lands resigned and was arrested twice following bribery allegations regarding the lease of state owned land on the coast line of Mauritius. It involved the use of fake contracts by notaries, lawyers and political intermediaries to extort money from a local businessman.	
Panamagate	2016	Ongoing political scandals in several countries, associated with the Panama Papers, a leaked set of 11.5 million confidential documents that provide detailed information on more than 214,000 offshore companies listed by the Panamanian corporate service provider Mossack Fonseca. In Malta, Panamagate refers to a March 2016 scandal surrounding Energy Minister Konrad Mizzi with an undeclared trust in New Zealand and a company in Panama. In Pakistan, the Panama Papers case, or Panamagate case, resulted in the disqualification of Prime Minister Nawaz Sharif from holding public office for 10 years.	
Pantigate	2014	Controversy surrounding payments by RTÉ after drag queen and LGBT activist Panti accused some anti-LGBT campaigners of homophobia.	
Pardongate	2001	Controversy surrounding Bill Clinton's pardons of 140 people on his last day in office as President of the United States, including Patty Hearst.	
Partygate (United Kingdom)	2021	A political scandal surrounding social gatherings of United Kingdom government and Conservative Party staff that took place during the COVID-19 pandemic in 2020 and 2021, when there were public health restrictions on such gatherings. Whilst several lockdowns in the country were in place, reported gatherings occurred at 10 Downing Street, its garden, and other government buildings. Starting in December 2021, these attracted substantial media attention, public debate, and controversy. The scandal contributed to the downfall of Prime Minister Boris Johnson, who was later found to have deliberately misled the House of Commons, a contempt of Parliament, over the affair by a privileges committee, prompting his resignation as an MP in June 2023.	
Partygate (Hong Kong)	2022	A political scandal in Hong Kong involving the birthday party of Witman Hung during the COVID-19 pandemic.	
Pastagate	2013	Montreal controversy, in which an Italian restaurant was investigated by the Quebec government for using words that do not comply with their language laws, such as "bottiglia", "calamari" and "pasta".	
Pastygate	2012	Controversy in March/April 2012 around the taxation by the UK Government of hot snacks such as pasties, where Conservative ministers were said to be out of touch with the eating habits of ordinary people.	
Pemexgate	2000	Scandal involving the state-owned oil company Pemex in Mexico in which funds were used to support the political campaign of Carlos Romero Deschamps, the presidential candidate for the Institutional Revolutionary Party.	
Penelopegate	2017	Revelation that French presidential candidate François Fillon had officially employed his wife Penelope as an aide while a politician, but that it was a fictitious job which she never worked but nonetheless earned over €1 million in public wages. Known as both "Penelopegate" and "l'affaire Fillon" (the Fillon affair) in French.	
Petrogate	2008	The name given by the press in Peru to the corruption case regarding large amounts of oil. Norwegian mining company Discover Petroleum and state-owned Perupetro were involved, which prompted the resignation of cabinet ministers.	
Pfizergate	2021	Ongoing political scandal centered on the lack of transparency in the communication and negotiation processes for purchasing a significant number of vaccine doses during the COVID-19 pandemic.	
Pfizergate	2021	Report raising concerns over the data integrity and regulatory oversight of Pfizer vaccine trials.	
Phone call-gate	2025	Also called the "Thailand–Cambodia phone call leak", a 9-minute phone conversation between Prime Minister of Thailand Paetongtarn Shinawatra and Cambodian Senate President Hun Sen on 15 June was leaked to about 80 Cambodian officials on 19 June. Hun (who he referred to as "uncle") published on Facebook on the entire 17-minute call on 18 June to avoid misunderstandings, while on the same day Paetongtarn (referred to as "niece") acknowledged that she was speaking in the leaked call, discussing on aims to threaten the Thailand's government in the midst of the ongoing border conflict. The leak precipitated a political crisis following the resignation of the Bhumjaithai Party from the governing coalition and become an opposition party, and by 1 July, Paetongtarn was suspended from office by the Constitutional Court of Thailand. On 29 August, the Constitutional Court upheld their decision and removed her from the office, and was later succeeded by Bhumjaithai Party leader Anutin Charnvirakul on 7 September.	
Pizzagate	2014	Mayor of New York City Bill de Blasio dined on pizza with a fork and knife, causing a humorous reaction on the internet.	
Plamegate (also "Leakgate", "CIA leak scandal", "Plame affair")	2005	The revealing, by Robert Novak, of the name of Valerie Plame. Lewis Libby allegedly leaked to the media the identity of a covert CIA agent who worked on WMDs, in retaliation for her husband, Joseph C. Wilson, criticizing George W. Bush's justification for the invasion of Iraq.	
Png-gate (also "NCMP-gate")	2012	Information about the Workers' Party (Singapore) Minutes were leaked online by an anonymous source during the hustings of the 2012 Hougang by-election held in May, which was called following the resignation of former Hougang SMC legislator Yaw Shin Leong three months earlier. The information revealed the leak by the party's Central Executive Committee making decision to elect one Non-constituency Member of Parliament from the East Coast Group Representation Constituency, which ultimately given to Gerald Giam. Png Eng Huat, who was also part of the East Coast team and the WP-candidate for the by-election, revealed the decision of not taking up the scheme, while the WP's then-leader Low Thia Khiang, the preceding MP for Hougang, apologized for the matter but chose not to pursue further and focused on the campaigning more. Both Png and Giam would later become elected MPs in the ensuing by-election and in 2020, respectively.	
Ponytailgate	2015	A young waitress claims Prime Minister of New Zealand John Key pulled at her hair's ponytail numerous times over several months while visiting the café, even after being requested to stop by her and his wife.	
Popcorngate	2021	Amid the COVID-19 pandemic and an ongoing curfew related to the pandemic, Quebec premier François Legault announced that movie theaters would be permitted to open in the province ahead of March break. However, with much of the province in the most restrictive "red" zone, the theaters were not permitted to sell popcorn or other concessions, unless they were located in the lesser restrictive "orange" zone. Legault justified that the move was so that patrons could keep their masks on throughout the entire movie, as a mask mandate had been in place in Quebec since July 18, 2020. The announcement was condemned by other MNAs as well as by movie theater mogul Vincenzo Guzzo (owner of Cinémas Guzzo, a prominent Quebec movie theater chain), who has been active on Twitter throughout the pandemic criticizing the handling of the pandemic by Legault. Quebec then announced that it would compensate movie theaters for the absence of popcorn sales. Guzzo refused the money and would not open his theaters until the end of May, when the curfew was lifted.	
Porngate	2012	Three members of the Karnataka Legislative Assembly in India resigned from their offices after accusations that they watched porn during government proceedings.	
Pussygate	2016	On October 7, 2016, The Washington Post released a video and accompanying article about Donald Trump and Billy Bush having "an extremely lewd conversation about women" in 2005. In the video, Trump indicated that he might start kissing a woman that he and Bush were about to meet during the filming of an episode of Access Hollywood. Trump further asserted that "when you're a star, they let you do it. You can do anything ... grab them by the pussy".	
Qatargate (European Union)	2022	Ongoing political scandal in which politicians, political staffers, lobbyists, civil servants and their families are alleged to have been involved in corruption, money laundering and organised crime involving the state of Qatar in exchange for influence at the European Parliament. Qatar denies the allegations. Law enforcement authorities in Belgium, Italy and Greece seized €1.5 million in cash, confiscated computers and mobile phones, and charged four individuals with the alleged offences.	
Qatargate (Israel)	2025	A scandal in Israel in which top aides in the office of Prime Minister Benjamin Netanyahu were allegedly being paid by Qatar.	
Railgate (also known as the Basi-Virk Affair and the BC Legislature Raids scandal)	2007	Scandal and court proceeding involving influence peddling and abuse of privilege in regard to the sale of BC Rail to Canadian National Railways by the government of British Columbia Premier Gordon Campbell, the raid of government offices in the provincial legislature building on December 28, 2003.	
Raeesah-gate	2021–2026	Singaporean politician Raeesah Khan resigned on November 30, 2021, after admitted to making unsubstantiated allegations in Parliament on three occasions. Investigations from the Parliament's Committee of Privileges referred that Khan's party, the Workers' Party, found that its secretary-general Pritam Singh and assistant chairman Faisal Manap had potentially misled the Parliament according to the public prosecutor. Singh was fined S$7,000 for each of the two charges he was convicted of, while Faisal was given a warning from the police. Singh lodged an appeal on 17 February 2025 after his judgement, which was later dismissed on 4 December that same year. On 15 January 2026, Prime Minister Lawrence Wong rescinds Singh's position as the Leader of the Opposition under the Parliament's recommendation from a motion which was passed the day before, though Singh remained as the MP. On 13 August, Singh was also removed from the law register under the decision made by the Court of Three Judges.	
Ranjangate	2020	A collection of audio recordings of phone calls between Sri Lankan MP Ranjan Ramanayake and several high-ranking government officials were leaked to the media.	
Ridoutgate (also known as the Ridout Road rentals)	2023	Singapore-based government agency Corrupt Practices Investigation Bureau (CPIB) investigated ministers K. Shanmugam and Vivian Balakrishnan on the rentals of 26 and 31 Ridout Road respectively, after a blog post was published by opposition politician Kenneth Jeyaretnam and initiated the case. Investigations were held from 23 May until 28 June, and revealed that neither ministers were convicted, with Senior Minister Teo Chee Hean, who launched its independent review on the situation, mentioned that there was "no abuse of power or conflict of interest resulting in the ministers gaining any unfair advantage or privilege".	
Rinkagate	1976	UK scandal in which Jeremy Thorpe, leader of the UK Liberal Party, lost his position and his seat in Parliament after being accused of involvement in an unsuccessful attempt to murder an alleged former gay lover. Thorpe was eventually acquitted, but the scandal and an unrelated personal illness ended his career. "Rinka" refers to a Great Dane that was killed in the attack.	
Robogate	2011	Allegations of widespread voter fraud targeting non-Conservative voters occurring during the 2011 Canadian federal election. Robotic and live calls to voters are claimed to have been made in 200 ridings. Investigation by the RCMP, the Conservative Party, and Elections Canada.	
Rolexgate	2024	Allegations of corruption involving Rolex watches and Peruvian President, Dina Boluarte.	
Russiagate	2016	The controversy and investigations of Russian interference in the 2016 US presidential election regarding the links between Trump associates and Russian officials and the Trump campaign's cooperation with that interference.	
Russiagate	2024	Scandal of Russian interference in EU elections.	
Rywingate	2002	A corruption scandal in Poland, which began in late 2002 while the post-communist government of the SLD (Democratic Left Alliance) was in power. It is named after the film producer Lew Rywin, who was a key figure.	
St Louis gate or Saint Louis gate	2020	Corruption scandal in Mauritius regarding the award of a contract for the upgrade of an existing diesel power station at St. Louis, on the outskirts of capital city Port Louis. Burmeister & Wain Scandinavian Contractor (BWSC) of Denmark was awarded the contract by the Mauritian power-generating entity Central Electricity Board (CEB) following a tender issued in 2014. A whistleblower alerted the financier African Development Bank (ADB) that the award to BWSC occurred after bribes had been received by several CEB employees through an intermediary of BWSC who owns a Mauritian construction company. ADB investigated the claims and thus excluded BWSC from all future work for 21 months. Leader of Opposition Arvin Boolell raised this issue in Parliament and several employees of CEB were stood down.	
Salmondgate	2018	Scandal involving former Scottish First Minister Alex Salmond who had been accused of sexually harassing two female aides in Bute House, Edinburgh. Salmond was eventually acquitted.	
Sharpiegate (distinguish from the identically named conspiracy theory)	2019	Repeated assertions by US president Donald Trump, falsely claiming that Hurricane Dorian would hit Alabama, showing a map altered using a black marker pen, and having the National Oceanic and Atmospheric Administration publish statements in support of his claims.	
Shawinigate	1999	Canadian scandal involving then-Prime Minister Jean Chrétien's profiting from real estate deals in his home riding of Shawinigan, Quebec.	
Shitholegate	2018	During a meeting with lawmakers about immigration, President Trump is reported to have asked, "Why are we having all these people from shithole countries come here?"	
Signalgate	2025	A scandal in which Jeffrey Goldberg, the editor-in-chief of the American magazine The Atlantic, was accidentally added to a Signal group chat where high level US government officials used the unsecure application to discuss sensitive military operations against the Houthis in Yemen prior to the operations taking place.	
Sleep-gate	2018	Conservative MP for Ayr, Carrick and Cumnock, Bill Grant was twice caught sleeping in the House of Commons. First, in December 2017, Grant appeared to have fallen asleep during a debate on pensions equality for women however, he claimed he was "listening intently". Then, in July 2018, during questions to the then Secretary of State for Housing, Communities and Local Government, James Brokenshire, Grant was again caught asleep but this time admitted that he had taken "a wee nap" and was "guilty as charged".	
Sofagate	2021	An incident in which the first female EU commission president Ursula von der Leyen was offered a seat on a sofa while EU council president Charles Michel and Turkish president Recep Tayyip Erdoğan were offered chairs.	
Sophiegate	2001	Tape of a conversation between Sophie, Countess of Wessex and Mazher Mahmood.	
Squidgygate (also known as "Dianagate")	1992	Tape of a telephone conversation between Diana, Princess of Wales and a male friend.	
Stickygate	2020	During the recount for the 2020 New York's 22nd congressional district election, sticky notes used by some boards of elections to mark disputed ballots fell off and became attached to other ballots.	
Stormontgate	2005	Allegations of a Provisional Irish Republican Army spy ring operating in Stormont (Home to the Northern Ireland Assembly).	
Strippergate (Seattle)	2003	Two separate government scandals and criminal investigations on the West Coast of the United States, both involving state and local politicians, strip clubs and organized crime.	
Strippergate (Canada)	2004-5	Canadian federal immigration minister Judy Sgro was accused of providing favours to people who helped with her political campaigning during the 2004 Canadian federal election.	
Strippergate (Israel)	2018	Yair Netanyahu was secretly filmed at a Tel Aviv strip club, referring to a controversial gas deal signed by his father, the Prime Minister of Israel (see Netanyahu corruption investigations)	
Swinggate	2019	Irish politician Maria Bailey sued a hotel after falling off a swing while holding a drink, at a time when insurance costs were rising due to high levels of personal injury claims.	
Tampongate (also known as "Camillagate")	1993	Following the release of a tape of a telephone conversation between Charles, Prince of Wales (later King Charles III) and Camilla Parker Bowles (later Queen Camilla).	
Taxigate	2005	Scottish Conservative Party leader David McLetchie was found to have claimed an excessive amount in taxi expenses (over £11,000) many of which were for party business rather than parliament business. The debacle resulted in McLetchie's resignation as Leader of the Scottish Conservative Party.	
Telegramgate (also known as Chatgate and RickyLeaks)	2019	A political scandal involving Ricardo Rosselló, Governor of Puerto Rico, that began on July 8, 2019, with the leaking of several pages of a group chat on the messaging application Telegram. The leak came in the midst of allegations by the ex-Secretary of Puerto Rico's Treasury, Raúl Maldonado Gautier, that his department boasted an "institutional mafia" which Rosselló was involved in.	
Thulegate	1995	Danish scandal regarding the storage of nuclear weapons in Greenland in the late 1950s and 1960s, in contravention of Denmark's nuclear-free policy.	
Toallagate	2001	Scandal in Mexico due to the high cost of bathroom towels (around US$400 apiece) bought for the official residence of the Mexican president.	
Traingate	2016	Labour leader Jeremy Corbyn filmed a short video of him sitting on the floor of a packed UK train on a three-hour journey saying he would not pay to upgrade his ticket to business class saying "after all it is the people's money". A couple of days later, Virgin Trains East Coast released CCTV footage challenging the Labour leader's claim, in which after filming the short video, Corbyn got up and sat in spare seats with his aides. The hashtag "traingate" trended highly on social media with Corbyn responding that he hoped Virgin Trains owner Richard Branson was "well aware" of his plans to re-nationalise the railways.	
Travelgate	1993	Controversy surrounding the firings of White House Travel Office employees at the start of the Clinton administration.	
Travelgate (South Africa)	2006	A controversy and resulting court case in South Africa involving Bathabile Dlamini and 13 other African National Congress government ministers who pleaded guilty of fraud after claiming travel benefits amounting to R254,000.	
Troopergate (1)	1994	Allegations by two Arkansas state troopers that they arranged sexual liaisons for then-governor Bill Clinton.	
Troopergate (2)	2007	Controversy involving New York Governor Eliot Spitzer, who allegedly ordered the state police to create special records of senate majority leader Joseph Bruno's whereabouts when he traveled with police escorts in New York City.	
Troopergate (3)	2008	The controversy surrounding allegations that Alaska Governor Sarah Palin, the 2008 Republican vice-presidential nominee for the United States presidential election, fired the state's public safety commissioner, allegedly for not cooperating with her demand that he dismiss her former brother-in-law, a state trooper. Palin used the term "Taser-gate", a reference to the allegation that the trooper used a taser on his 10-year-old stepson.	
Trousergate	2016	Controversy following a photograph taken of then UK Prime Minister Theresa May in The Sunday Times in which she was wearing a pair of brown leather trousers, reportedly worth £1000. Former Conservative Secretary of State for Education Nicky Morgan criticized May for the photo and claimed she had never spent that amount of money on anything except her wedding dress. When Morgan withdrew from her scheduled appearance on Have I Got News for You on December 16 at short notice, following an ensuing row with May's aide Fiona Hill, she was replaced with a leather handbag on the show after it transpired she owned a similar bag costing £950.	
Tunagate	1985	Canadian political scandal involving large quantities of possibly spoiled tuna that were sold to the public.	
Uenogate	2026	The collapse of Ueno Bank, which triggered the impeachment, removal and arrest of former president Santiago Peña.	
Ukrainegate	2019	A conversation between Donald Trump and Ukrainian president Volodymyr Zelenskyy in which an intelligence analyst who listened in on the conversation filed a whistleblower complaint that Trump was demanding that Ukraine commence an investigation of Hunter Biden (son of Joe Biden, a potential opponent in the 2020 United States presidential election), as well as unofficial clandestine diplomatic efforts by Rudy Giuliani and threats to withhold Congressionally-approved military aid.	
Utegate	2009	Australian political incident in June 2009 around the lending of a utility vehicle ("ute") to Prime Minister Kevin Rudd by car dealer John Grant, and subsequent allegations of improper favorable treatment of Grant by the Treasury department.	
Valijagate	2007	Venezuelan-American entrepreneur Guido Antonini Wilson arrived in Argentina on a private flight hired by Argentine state officials carrying US$800,000 in cash, which he failed to declare.	
Watergate (Australia)	2019–present	An Australian political scandal surrounding an AUD$80 million water buyback in 2017 by the federal government as part of the Murray–Darling Basin Plan. The buyback was approved by Barnaby Joyce, and the money went to a private company registered in the Cayman Islands, which was co-founded by Angus Taylor. Joyce and Taylor were both government ministers and members of the National Party.	
Water Bottle-gate	2013	A media controversy wherein US Senator Marco Rubio interrupted his rebuttal to President Obama's state of the union address to grab an offscreen bottle of water and take a drink.	
Waterkantgate (also known as Watergate an der Waterkant)	1987	A major political scandal in Germany. West German politician Uwe Barschel allegedly issued orders for political rival Björn Engholm to be spied upon, with the aim of bringing tax evasion charges against him; as well as orders to install a bugging device in his own phone to frame Engholm's party, the Social Democratic Party of Germany. Barschel's guilt was never proven.	
Weinergate	2011	US Representative Anthony Weiner's Twitter account linked to an inappropriate photograph. Weiner claimed that his account had been hacked, but later admitted he sent the tweet; numerous other lewd photographs from Weiner were later revealed. In 2013, after he resigned from the House and attempted to return to politics by running for mayor of New York City, it was revealed that he had been involved in another sexting relationship with a woman in her early twenties.	
Willowgate	1988–1989	A corruption scandal in Zimbabwe in which The Bulawayo Chronicle revealed illegal resale of automobile purchases by various government officials. The ensuing investigation resulted in the resignations of five members of President Robert Mugabe's cabinet. One of the five, Maurice Nyagumbo, later committed suicide after being charged with perjury. The reporters who had broken the story, Geoffrey Nyarota and Davison Maruziva, were subsequently removed from their posts.	
Vacunagate	2021	487 people (mainly senior officials of the Executive Power of Peru) were irregularly vaccinated against COVID-19. Among these people were former president Martín Vizcarra and high-ranking officials of the Peruvian government such as the Minister of Foreign Affairs Elizabeth Astete and the Minister of Health Pilar Mazzetti.	
Omtzigtgate, Scoutinggate or Scoutsgate (Dutch: Verkenningsgate, Verkennersgate)	2021	In March 2021, Dutch cabinet formation scout Kajsa Ollongren left Parliament in a hurry after learning of her positive COVID-test. A photograph showed her legible notes. It read among other things: "position Omtzigt, position elsewhere" (Dutch: positie Omtzigt, functie elders). Pieter Omtzigt is a critical and rebellious MP. Ollongren and her colleague resigned shortly after. Prime Minister and party leader Mark Rutte claimed that he had not discussed Omtzigt. Documents later showed the opposite. Rutte claimed he did not remember (Dutch: Ik heb er geen actieve herinnering aan, which became a stock phrase in society). After he said he had been notified of the documents' content hours before the debate and ahead of other leaders, and refused to say by whom, an unsuccessful motion of no confidence was introduced.	

=== Sports ===
Name	Year	Description	Refs
Astrogate	2018	In Game 1 of the MLB American League Championship between the Boston Red Sox and the Houston Astros, a Houston Astros employee was removed from the stadium after being caught spying on the Red Sox dugout.	
Balogungate	2026	After the player Folarin Balogun received a red card during the match against Bosnia and Herzegovina, it came to light that the President of the United States had called President of FIFA Gianni Infantino to overrule the decision and take away his red card so he was eligible to play against Belgium the next game.	
Barçagate (1), or Bartogate	2020	During Josep Maria Bartomeu's presidency of Futbol Club Barcelona, the club allegedly hired a social media agency to protect the president's image and defame popular figures related to the club. These included players such as Lionel Messi, ex-players like Xavi, and even high-profile political figures such as Quim Torra and Carles Puigdemont.	
Bibgate	2009	American Nordic combined skier Bill Demong's disqualification for not wearing his bib during the ski jumping part of the team event at the FIS Nordic World Ski Championships 2009, in Liberec, Czech Republic, on February 26.	
Bladegate	2012	Controversy that arose during the 2012 Summer Paralympics when athlete Oscar Pistorius questioned the size of the running blade of fellow amputee sprinter Alan Oliveira on live television when the former unexpectedly caught up with Pistorius and narrowly overtook him before the finishing line at the Men's 200 metres T44 final.	
Bloodgate	2009	The events surrounding a faked injury to Tom Williams of English rugby union side Harlequins in a 2008–09 Heineken Cup quarterfinal against eventual champions Leinster. Specifically, Williams used fake blood to dupe the referee into allowing Harlequins to send in a blood replacement, at the instigation of Harlequins coach Dean Richards and team physiotherapist Steph Brennan. Williams later admitted that his mouth had been cut open immediately after the match in an attempt to cover up the fake injury. Richards was ultimately banned from rugby for three years and Brennan for two; Williams was initially banned for one year, but his ban was reduced to four months for his role in revealing the full extent of the scheme.	
Boopgate	2026	During the 2026 Winter Olympics, the Swedish men's curling team accused Canadian curler Marc Kennedy of touching one of his team's stones after it crossed the hog line, which is not permitted. The Canadians forcefully denied the accusation, and the game umpires ruled that no violation occurred. However, playback footage appeared to show Kennedy touching the stone as it crossed the line. The controversy received widespread attention, with Kennedy's alleged "booping" of the stone becoming fodder for memes across social media.	
Bottlegate	2001	Rowdy fans of the Cleveland Browns threw beer bottles and other debris on the field after a controversially overturned call in the final minute of the game led to the Browns losing the game 15–10 to the Jacksonville Jaguars.	
Bountygate	2012	In March 2012, the NFL discovered that from 2009 to 2011, a number of New Orleans Saints players and defensive coordinator Gregg Williams had operated a "bounty" scheme, illegal under league rules, in which defensive players received financial rewards for big plays, including those that injured offensive players. The investigation also revealed that head coach Sean Payton knew about the scheme but took no steps to stop it. NFL commissioner Roger Goodell handed out multiple suspensions to coaches and players involved in the scheme. The most severe was an indefinite suspension (ultimately one year) for Williams and season-long suspensions for Payton and player Jonathan Vilma (Vilma's suspension was overturned during the season).	
Broomgate	2015	In the sport of curling, new broom head technologies led to a change in sweeping strategies, and ultimately led to standardized brush heads in competitive curling.	
Clickgate (also known as "Clicky Ponting")	2026	In cricket, during a match between Norton and Saltburn second eleven sides in the North Yorkshire and South Durham Cricket League Division 2, video footage was captured of Saltburn fielder Brian Devine clicking his fingers in imitation of the sound of the ball striking the bat, while Norton's Noman Shabir missed the ball. The umpire declared Shabir to be out believing him to have been caught, but footage of the incident went online and lead to claims that Saltburn tricked the umpire. Claims from other teams in the league such as the Middlesbrough second eleven that they had also fallen victim to this tactic resulted in resulted in the league formerly investigating the incident. Devine and Saltburn were both found guilty, leading to Devine being banned from all forms of cricket for two years, and Saltburn being relegated to the third division, and starting the 2027 season with a 60-point penalty. Aside from being known as "clickgate", the incident was also dubbed "Clicky Ponting" in reference to the Australian cricket captain Ricky Ponting.	
Coughgate	2017	Allegations that professional darts player and 27th seed Justin Pipe coughed in the direction of opponent Bernie Smith, in order to distract and prevent Smith from throwing a match-winning double 10 during the first round of the 2018 PDC World Darts Championship. Pipe was fined £3,000 and was reprimanded for the incident by the Darts Regulation Authority in January 2018.	
Crashgate	2008	The allegations of race fixing at the 2008 Singapore Grand Prix, where Renault team bosses Flavio Briatore and Pat Symonds allegedly ordered Nelson Piquet Jr. to crash, handing an advantage to his teammate, Fernando Alonso. Neither driver would be punished, but Symonds and Briatore would be banned from all FIA events for five years and indefinitely, respectively, although this would later be overturned.	
Deflategate	2015	After the 2015 AFC Championship game, the NFL acknowledged it was investigating reports that the game balls had been deflated. One report may have come from Indianapolis Colts player D'Qwell Jackson after he intercepted a pass by New England Patriots quarterback Tom Brady. Patriots coach Bill Belichick stated he knew nothing of the reports until the morning following the game, and that he and the team would "cooperate fully" with any investigation. Brady called the allegation "ridiculous". On January 20, sources reported that 11 of 12 footballs provided by the Patriots were underinflated. On May 11, 2015, the NFL announced it had suspended Brady without pay for 4 games of the upcoming season. The Patriots were fined $1 million and lost their first-round pick in the 2016 NFL draft and their fourth-round pick in the 2017 NFL draft. In September 2015 a federal judge overturned the suspension, allowing Brady to play the 2015 season. A federal appeals court overturned the lower court's ruling, reimposing the suspension for 2016.	
Doorgate	2024	During a World Snooker Championship match between Ronnie O'Sullivan and Stuart Bingham at the Crucible, a door was left open allowing spectators to enter. O'Sullivan complained that this was distracting him and refused to take the shot until the doors had been closed so no one could come in. Dubbed "Doorgate" by former snooker player Steve Davis.	
Dronegate	2024	An official with the Canada women's national soccer team was caught using drone surveillance to spy on the New Zealand team ahead of their match in the 2024 Summer Olympics.	
FIFA-gate	2015	A case of corruption and money laundering by officials and associates connected with FIFA, the governing body of association football, futsal and beach soccer.	
Grannygate	2006	A rugby league scandal involving New Zealand players, their family history and therefore their eligibility for the national team. The term was most recently invoked in the 2006 Rugby League Tri-Nations series, in which New Zealand was penalized for fielding hooker Nathan Fien despite his ineligibility.	
Handshakegate	2025	Used to describe the Indian cricket team's players refusal to shake hands with the players of the Pakistan cricket team after a match in the 2025 Asia Cup, and the subsequent controversies.	
Helmetgate (1)	2019	At the start of the 2019-2020 NFL season, Antonio Brown's helmet was considered too old to be used. Brown initially refused to give up his old helmet and got into a prolific dispute with the Oakland Raiders. After losing two grievances with the NFL, Brown eventually gave in and wore an approved helmet.	
Helmetgate (2)	2019	During the Week 11 game between the Cleveland Browns and Pittsburgh Steelers, a brawl broke out where Browns defensive end Myles Garrett removed Steelers Quarterback Mason Rudolph's helmet and struck him in the head with it. Garrett was later suspended indefinitely and eventually reinstated after a meeting with the commissioner's office during the offseason.	
Homeworkgate	2013	Used to describe a controversial sequence of events that took place during the Australian cricket tour of India in 2013.	
Indygate	2005	Seven Formula One teams pull out of the 2005 United States Grand Prix at Indianapolis Motor Speedway ("Indy") following tyre failures and the inability to come to a compromise with the FIA.	
Jeansgate	2024	During the 2024 FIDE World Rapid Chess Championship, Norwegian grandmaster and defending champion Magnus Carlsen was handed a $200 fine for wearing jeans, which violated FIDE's dress code. He was given an ultimatum to either change or not be paired in round 9 of the tournament, but would not be disqualified or be unpaired for the remaining rounds. However, Carlsen decided to resign from the tournament, which would have meant resigning from the following World Blitz Championship a few days later as well. On 29 December 2024, one day before the Blitz Championship, Carlsen and FIDE confirmed that he would still participate in this tournament, with FIDE giving him the green light to play with jeans.	
Lasagne-gate	2006	On the final day of the 2005–06 FA Premier League, Tottenham Hotspur played against London rivals West Ham United, with Tottenham fighting for a spot for next season's Champion's League. The day before the match, the Tottenham players ate lasagne for lunch. Later, many of the players fell ill and missed the match, with Tottenham losing 2-1. A conspiracy theory arose claiming that the lasagne had given the team food poisoning, but an investigation by the Health Protection Agency declared that the cause was an outbreak of norovirus.	
Liegate	2009	Allegations of Lewis Hamilton lying to stewards at the 2009 Australian Grand Prix, where Hamilton and McLaren told stewards another driver passed him under the safety car illegally when McLaren had ordered Hamilton to let the other driver pass.	
Lleytgate	2008	The sixth day of the 2008 Australian Open featured a long, five-set match between World No. 1 Roger Federer and Janko Tipsarević, which extended into the evening session of the day, and thus delayed it by more than two hours. As a result, the scheduled second match of the session between Lleyton Hewitt and Marcos Baghdatis did not start until just before midnight Australian time, and the match, which also lasted five sets, did not finish until 4:33am local time. The second match had been delayed initially as a match between Venus Williams and Sania Mirza had to be played out first, as per the schedule.	
Lochtegate	2016	Scandal involving United States swim team members Ryan Lochte, Jimmy Feigen, Gunnar Bentz, and Jack Conger during the 2016 Summer Olympics held in Rio de Janeiro, Brazil. While initial news stories reported that Lochte and three other US swimmers had been robbed at gunpoint after a night out in Rio, later details emerged that the "armed robbers posing as police" were actually security guards at a gas station where the swimmers had urinated outside the bathroom and Lochte allegedly vandalized a framed poster, and ended with the swimmers providing money to the guards. Some of the swimmers were detained in Brazil as witnesses. Ultimately, the athletes each released statements, and one swimmer paid a fine of approximately $10,800 to a Brazilian charity in order to get his passport back. Lochte apologized for not being more candid about the gas station dispute, and subsequently lost four major sponsorships.	
Moggigate	2006	Football clubs of Italian Serie A were involved in a referee appointment scandal, named after Juventus general manager Luciano Moggi.	
Monkeygate	2008	During the verbal altercation between Andrew Symonds and Harbhajan Singh in the second Test between India and Australia in Sydney in 2008, the off-spinner allegedly hurled a racist abuse at Symonds, referring to him as a 'Monkey'.	
Napgate	2010	In May 2010, Ken Griffey Jr., who played for Major League Baseball (MLB)'s Seattle Mariners, was asleep in the clubhouse according to two teammates. Griffey did not deny being asleep and retired one month later.	
Piegate	2017	During Sutton United's 0–2 loss to Arsenal in the 2016–17 FA Cup, Sutton United's goalkeeper Wayne Shaw knowingly ate a pasty while sitting on the bench after learning of a betting company offering 8–1 odds against him eating pie during the game. Shaw defended himself by saying he did it in response to fans chanting "Who ate all the pies?" Shaw resigned from Sutton United soon after, and was fined £375 and banned for two months by the FA.	
Pizzagate (also known as the "Battle of the Buffet")	2004	Manchester United manager Alex Ferguson was assaulted with a slice of pizza by an unnamed opposition player following a tumultuous league game against Arsenal. Former Arsenal player Cesc Fàbregas later admitted to throwing the pizza in 2017.	
Sandpapergate	2018	Ball tampering scandal involving the men's Australian national cricket team during their 2017–18 tour of South Africa. During the third Test, Cameron Bancroft was revealed by television cameras to have rubbed the cricket ball with sandpaper, with the intent to make it swing in flight. Cricket Australia later banned captain Steve Smith and vice-captain David Warner from all international and domestic cricket for one year for their roles in the scandal, while Bancroft received a nine-month ban. Although not involved, Australia coach Darren Lehmann resigned after the fourth Test.	
Seatgate	2011	Referring to the scandal of over 800 ticketed fans being denied seats at Super Bowl XLV due to Fire Officials' regulations.	
Shouldergate	1978	A controversy that arose in June 1978 when the Pittsburgh Steelers were found to have practiced in shoulder pads during an off-season period in which such drills were not allowed under NFL rules. The team was stripped of its third-round selection in the 1979 NFL draft as a penalty.	
Sirengate	2006	A controversial match in Australian rules football when the umpire failed to hear the final siren, allowing St Kilda to score an extra point and draw the match. Four days later, the Australian Football League overturned the result and awarded the match to Fremantle.	
Skategate	2002	During the pairs competition at the 2002 Winter Olympics in Salt Lake City, controversy brewed when Canadian skaters Jamie Salé and David Pelletier were denied the gold medal despite a clean long program while Russian pair Elena Berezhnaya and Anton Sikharulidze won the title despite making several mistakes, causing an uproar from both the Canadian and American media. It was later revealed that French judge Marie-Reine Le Gougne had been pressured by Didier Gailhaguet, the head of the French skating federation into voting for the Russians in the pairs competition in exchange for the Russians voting for the French team in the ice dance competition. As a result, Le Gougne was suspended by the ISU for 3 years and her marks for the long program were thrown out, resulting in a 4–4 split decision. The IOC then decided to upgrade the Canadians' silver to gold, and a second medal ceremony was held with both the Russian and Canadian pairs attending.	
Snowball-gate	2026	A political controversy in New York City was sparked by a mass snowball fight in Washington Square Park after the 2026 blizzard, which resulted in injuries to several NYPD officers and the use of police force against the crowd. The incident drew sharp condemnation from Governor Kathy Hochul and police officials, who labeled the acts of snowball-throwers "criminal", while Mayor Zohran Mamdani faced a "failure of leadership" accusation for downplaying the event as mere "winter revelry".	
Sonicsgate	2009	The controversial relocation of the National Basketball Association (NBA)'s Seattle SuperSonics to Oklahoma City. The creators of the Webby Award-winning 2009 documentary Sonicsgate coined this term as the title of their film and video series, which soon became synonymous with the scandal as the definitive historical document on the topic.	
Spingate	2013	Near the end of the 2013 Federated Auto Parts 400 race in the NASCAR Sprint Cup Series at Richmond International Raceway on September 7, 2013, team orders became an issue in order to ensure certain drivers would make the Chase for the Sprint Cup. Michael Waltrip Racing driver Clint Bowyer spun in turn 4 on lap 393 of 400 to bring out a caution while Michael Waltrip Racing's general manager and vice president Ty Norris ordered Brian Vickers to pit, both in an attempt to help Michael Waltrip Racing driver Martin Truex Jr. make the Chase over Ryan Newman, who was leading the race before the caution caused by Bowyer. Carl Edwards won the race and Truex made the Chase while Newman did not. A few days after the race, Michael Waltrip Racing was fined $300,000 while Bowyer and Truex both lost 50 points, enough to knock Truex out of the Chase and allow Newman to make it. In addition, it was determined that Penske Racing and Front Row Motorsports collaborated to have Front Row Motorsports driver David Gilliland give up track position to ensure Penske Racing driver Joey Logano made the Chase at the expense of Hendrick Motorsports driver Jeff Gordon, who was subsequently added as a 13th Chase driver.	
Spygate (1) (also known as Stepneygate)	2007	Allegations of espionage in Formula One racing carried out by members of the McLaren team against the Ferrari team in 2007. The documents taken were given to the team by Ferrari factory worker Nigel Stepney. After unrelated events at the 2007 Hungarian Grand Prix launched an investigation, McLaren were disqualified from the Constructors' Championship and fined $100,000,000, however the drivers were not punished.	
Spygate (2)	2007	The scandal involving the New England Patriots' videotaping of the New York Jets defensive signals during a 2007 NFL game.	
Spygate (3)	2017	The scandal involving the Houston Astros using technology to steal signs from their opponents using a video camera hidden in center field during the 2017 season in which the Astros won the World Series.	
Spygate (4)	2026	Southampton F.C. were charged with spying on a Middlesbrough F.C. training session ahead of a decisive play-off semi-final match after a performance analyst allegedly employed by Southampton attended the session to take photographs and recordings. Southampton went on to win the match and, on 19 May 2026, were subsequently expelled from the EFL Championship play-off final, with victims of the scandal Middlesbrough taking their spot. Southampton also admitted to having spied on Ipswich Town F.C. and Oxford United F.C..	
Stickygate	2021	The 2021 sticky stuff controversy in Major League Baseball, referring to the sticky substances used by pitchers to enhance grip and spin.	
Strippergate	2015	In October 2015, Katina Powell, a self-described former madam, published a book in which she charged that former University of Louisville men's basketball staffer Andre McGee had paid her $10,000 over a four-year period, during which the Cardinals won a national title, to provide strippers and prostitutes for players and recruits. In June 2017, the NCAA announced major penalties that, after a failed appeal by Louisville, forced the Cardinals to vacate their 2013 national title.	
Stumpgate (or Creasegate)	2023	During the second test match at Lord's, London in the 2023 Ashes series, Australian wicketkeeper Alex Carey successfully stumped English batsman Jonny Bairstow, who walked out of his crease before the umpire signalled that the over was complete. England disagreed with Australia's appeal for the wicket, as they felt it was against 'the spirit of cricket.'	
Tattoogate	2011	In May 2011, Jim Tressel, the head coach of the Ohio State Buckeyes football team, resigned amid allegations that he lied in order to cover up activities, including tattoos, undertaken in violation of NCAA rules by players he was coaching.	
Tigergate	2010	A series of alleged and admitted marital infidelities by golf superstar Tiger Woods.	
Toiletgate	2006	The allegations by Veselin Topalov and his manager Silvio Danailov during the World Chess Championship 2006 that Topalov's opponent Vladimir Kramnik was visiting the toilet suspiciously frequently during games. The allegations were never proven, and were widely viewed within the international chess playing community as an act of gamesmanship on the part of Topalov and Danailov, attempting to distract Kramnik at a time when he was ahead in the match.	
Tripgate	2010	During a December 11, 2010 NFL game between the New York Jets and Miami Dolphins, the Jets' strength and conditioning coach Sal Alosi tripped Dolphins gunner Nolan Carroll as he ran down the Jets sideline. The Jets suspended Alosi indefinitely for setting up a "wall" on the sideline and claimed that "he acted alone in doing so".	
Tyregate/Pirelligate	2013	Allegations against F1 tyre supplier Pirelli and Mercedes carrying out illegal tyre testing during June 2013 followed by a series of tyre failures during the 2013 British Grand Prix.	

=== Technology ===
Name	Year	Description	Country	Refs
Antennagate (also known as Gripgate)	2010	The name the media applied to the controversy over the Apple iPhone 4's antenna after initial users complained of dropped calls and Consumer Reports would not recommend it.	United States	
Audiblegate	2020	The controversy around Audible secretly deducting costs of audiobook returns from rights holders even though the listener had already listened to it before returning it.	Worldwide	
Batterygate	2016	Involves the implementation of performance controls on older models of Apple's iPhone line in order to preserve system stability on degraded batteries.	Worldwide	
Bendgate	2014	Numerous people reported bent Apple iPhone 6 Plus phones, which was later reported on by Consumer Reports.	United States	
Bumpgate	2008	Nvidia Graphics Processing Unit (GPU) chips experienced high failure rates because a design flaw lead to cracked solder bumps.	Worldwide	
Chipgate	2015	Apple used two different kinds of processors in the iPhone 6S and 6S Plus, one made by Samsung and the other by TSMC, with the Samsung one running hotter and using more power.	United States	
Ciscogate	2005	Security researcher Michael Lynn gave a presentation at Black Hat about security vulnerabilities in Cisco routers, against the wishes of his employer Internet Security Systems	United States	
Crackgate	2026	Apple Inc.'s latest iPhone model series, iPhone Duo, was released with issues ranging from optimization to cracking of internal displays. Apple responded on conducting product replacements for affected users instead of a recall due to overwhelming sales responses.	United States	
Dieselgate (or Emissionsgate)	2015	International Council on Clean Transportation and West Virginia University caught Volkswagen cheating on emissions tests on about 11 million diesel cars by programming them to enable emissions controls during testing, but not control NO_{x} pollution during real world driving	Worldwide	
Donglegate	2013	At a Python Conference, a misinterpretation of the words "dongle" and "forking" led to two people being fired and a DDoS attack.	United States	
Flexgate	2019	Some of Apple's fourth generation MacBook Pro can feature uneven lighting at the bottom of the screen, which looks a bit like a "stage light" effect, and the display can eventually fail entirely after frequent opening and close the lid due to fragile flex cable.	Worldwide	
Jensengate	2026	Jensen Huang, the co-founder and CEO of a technology company Nvidia, was accused on October 29, 2026 about an espionage plot involving the United States Intelligence Community spying on the Chinese government, and his involvement in an extramarital affair with Megaspeed executive Alice Huang (no relation to Jensen). Jensen resigned from his CEO position on November 11, nearly two weeks since the accusations first surfaced, with investigations by Nvidia and other companies to follow thereafter.	United States	
Locationgate	2011	The controversy surrounding the discovery that the Apple iPhone stored location coordinates and timestamps of owner's movements in a hidden file, with a year's worth of location recorded on the phone. Led to multiple class action lawsuits, a US Senate hearing, and a mention on South Park.	Worldwide	
MoFi Gate	2022	The controversy within the audiophile and vinyl communities surrounding the discovery that audiophile reissue label Mobile Fidelity Sound Lab was pressing records using digital masters, despite implying in their marketing that they were using all-analogue sources.	Worldwide	
Notegate	2016	Lithium-ion batteries spontaneously combusting in Samsung's Galaxy Note 7.	Worldwide	
Pengate	2015	Anger over Samsung's design flaw in the Galaxy Note 5 which allows the stylus to be put in backwards. Once the stylus was put in backwards, it got stuck and destroyed the sensors that detected stylus removal.	United States	
Petrikgate	2009–2012	An attempt by the Russian pseudoscientist Viktor Petrik and the politician Boris Gryzlov to get a contract for a massive amount of low quality water filters at an inflated price under the guise of cutting-edge new technology. (see Russian article: Петрикгейт)	Russia	
Rapidgate (and Coldgate)	2018	A phenomenon in the rapid charging (DC Fast Charging, Supercharging) of a few electric car models (especially Nissan Leaf 2nd generation) where the charging speed is greatly reduced due to high battery temperatures after the first or second rapid charge. This causes much longer charging stops on long road trips. Most other cars have cooling systems and are not affected. Also, in low temperatures, lithium-ion batteries would be damaged if charged too fast. Most cars can heat up their battery, either from the grid when plugged in, or even from the battery itself when a charging stop is planned.	Worldwide	
Radeongate	2011	In 2011 15" and 17" MacBook Pro models, the AMD Radeon HD 6000M series graphics processing units (GPUs) were prone to catastrophically failing due to poor usage of lead-free solder, as well as poor thermal design being implemented into the laptops.	Worldwide	
Resolutiongate	2013	A controversy about the resolution on the Xbox One console.	Worldwide	
Shirtgate	2014	Matt Taylor, a Rosetta mission project scientist, wore a homemade shirt at an ESA press conference that caused concern.	United States	
Staingate	2015	Anger over reports that the anti-reflective coating appeared to be wearing off several Apple MacBook Pros, including mid-2012 to mid-2014 models sold between June 2012 and present.	United States	
Webcamgate	2010	The Lower Merion School District in Philadelphia was accused of remotely activating the webcams on their students' school-issued Apple MacBooks and secretly taking pictures of them in their homes.	United States	

=== Other ===
Name	Year	Description	Refs
Buttergate	2020–2021	In February 2021, reports emerged regarding industry-wide changes in the consistency of Canadian-produced butter, which softened at a slower pace at room temperature than before. It was speculated that the increased use of palm oil or palmitic acid in feed by dairy farmers to help meet demand may have had an impact on the resulting butter products.	
Fartgate (United States)	2019	In November 2019 US Representative Eric Swalwell (D-CA) appeared on MSNBC's Hardball, when a fart sound "ripped through the airwaves". Swalwell denied the allegations, writing "It was not me!!!!!" to BuzzFeed News in a text. The show later attempted to explain away the sound, claiming "it was the #hardball mug scraping across the desk".	
Flossgate	2016	A scandal when the 2015 United States Dietary Guidelines for Americans did not include a recommendation about flossing.	
Horsegate (also "Horsemeat-gate")	2013	A UK scandal in which it emerged that several large supermarket chains were selling meat containing horse or equine meat while claiming they were "100% beef". Further context to this is that, while horsemeat is mostly fine for human consumption and is eaten in countries throughout Europe and the rest of the world, it is rarely sold on the mainstream UK market and is considered somewhat culturally unacceptable to eat in British society.	
Monkeygate	2018	The controversy after it was revealed that Volkswagen had experimented on monkeys to prove that diesel exhaust was not harmful to primates.	
Ninovgate	2001–2002	The controversy that occurred after a formal investigation at Lawrence Berkeley National Laboratory found that the 1999 data behind the synthesis of elements 116 and 118 were fabricated by Victor Ninov, the first coauthor of the scientific discovery paper.	
Nutellagate	2013	A controversy at Columbia University surrounding allegations of widespread Nutella theft that cost the university $5,000 per week.	
Nutgate	2014	Korean Air vice president Heather Cho, dissatisfied with the way a flight attendant served her nuts on a plane, ordered the aircraft to return to the gate before takeoff, before dismissing the flight attendant and cabin crew chief. She was arrested two months later and charged with interfering with flight safety. The crew members eventually returned to their positions.	
Smooshgate	2018	A proposal for a JavaScript language feature called Array.prototype.flatten turns out to be Web-incompatible. The proposal author jokingly suggested renaming 'flatten' to 'smoosh' to avoid the compatibility issue. The joke was not clear to everyone, and some people started to incorrectly believe that the new name had already been decided.	
Tiaragate	2018	The controversy involving Meghan Markle's disagreement with palace staff and Queen Elizabeth II's aides over the tiara she would use for her wedding, with Prince Harry allegedly reacting strongly before the situation was resolved.	
Toegate	1992	The 1992 tabloid sting in which Sarah Ferguson, then Duchess of York, was secretly photographed having her toes kissed by John Bryan while they were on holiday, sparking a major royal controversy.	

== Conspiracy theories ==
These conspiracy theories have been given the -gate suffix by both supporters and critics of them.

Name	Year	Description	Country	Refs
Italygate	2020–present	Allegations that the 2020 United States presidential election was rigged in Joe Biden's favor by switching votes from Donald Trump to Biden at the US Embassy in Rome.	United States	
Kategate	2024	Speculation and gossip concerned with Catherine, Princess of Wales prior to the public announcement of her cancer diagnosis.	United Kingdom	
Obamagate	2020	Used by President Donald Trump as a nickname for unsubstantiated claims that his predecessor Barack Obama had spied on his incoming administration.	United States	
Pencilgate	2016	Allegations that the use of pencils in UK voting stations in the lead-up to the EU membership referendum allowed for MI5 to erase the results of Brexit voters. This led to the hashtags #Usepens and #Pencilgate on social media in the UK.	United Kingdom	
Piggate	2015	The name given to the accusation Lord Ashcroft made against British Prime Minister David Cameron of performing a ritual in which he engaged in sexual acts with a dead pig's head.	United Kingdom	
Pizzagate	2016–present	In reference to an alleged child-sex trafficking ring run by high-ranking Democratic Party officials out of the basement of a pizza restaurant.	United States	
Sharpiegate (distinguish from the identically named political controversy)	2020	Allegations that the use of marker pens invalidated ballots in the 2020 United States presidential election in the state of Arizona.	United States	
Spygate	2018	A conspiracy theory initiated by President Donald Trump in May 2018 that the Obama administration had put a spy in his 2016 presidential campaign for political purposes.	United States	

== In popular culture ==
The suffix has also been commonly used in the context of popular media, including satirical usage by television pundits and viewers of reality shows.

Name	Year	Description	Refs
Dressgate	2015	Debate over whether a popular photograph depicted a blue-and-black dress or a white-and-gold one.	

=== Film and television ===
Name	Show	Episode	Description	Refs
Bingate	The Great British Bake Off	Series 5, Episode 4: "Desserts"	The ice cream in contestant Iain's baked Alaska did not set and he threw his baked Alaska in the bin and walked off the set. The editing suggested another contestant Diana Beard was responsible for this. Later, when the contestants had to present their bakes to the judges, Iain presented the bin in which he had discarded his baked Alaska. He was eliminated, with the judges saying they could not judge him due to him not presenting them with anything to taste.	
Butterflygate	RuPaul's Drag Race	Season 10, Episode 14: "Grand Finale"	Finalist Asia O'Hara attempted a reveal during her lip sync using live butterflies. Temperature issues meant the butterflies did not leave hibernation in time, leading them to appear dead or lethargic during the performance instead of flying away as intended.	
Clipgate	The Colbert Report		Stephen Colbert's mocking of Fox News Channel's portrayal of the way Barack Obama presented his jobs bill proposal with pages clipped together, rather than bound together.	
Flatgate	The Thick of It		Government minister Hugh Abbot is involved in a scandal surrounding the ownership of a Notting Hill flat – which the press are dubbing "Flatgate", but which Abbot's secretary feels would better be named "Notting Hill Gate gate".	
Kimono-gate	RuPaul's Drag Race	Season 8, Episode 5: "Supermodel Snatch Game"	Half of the remaining queens came out on stage in a kimono, inspired by Madonna's "Nothing Really Matters" video and "Paradise (Not For Me)" for a Madonna-inspired runway.	
Manorgate	The Hunt		Athena and several of her friends send texts to each other about hunting people for sport. The texts were satirical but people dubbed the controversy "Manorgate" and believed that they were actually hunting people. In response, Athena and her friends decide to make Manorgate a reality by actually hunting people for sport.	
Maskgate	RuPaul's Drag Race	Season 9, Episode 9: "Your Pilot's On Fire"	The contestant Valentina initially refuses to remove her mask during the "lip sync for your life". This incident was referred to as "Maskgate" by viewers.	
Muffgate	Pitch Perfect	Pitch Perfect 2	A cappella singing group The Barden Bellas are performing for President Obama at the Kennedy Center when Fat Amy descends from the rafters in Cirque du Soleil-like trapeze silks as if to perform an acrobatic sequence à la Pink while performing Wrecking Ball. Unfortunately, the silks rip, Amy's pants split, she flips upside down, and she delivers a wardrobe-malfunction that comes to be referred to as "Muffgate".	
Notegate	The Traitors	Season 1, Episode 3: 'Murder They Wrote'	In Episode 3, just before the round table, Brandi (who was banished) and Kate discussed who is a traitor, in which they discussed the possibility of Shelbe and Amanda being The Traitors’ next target. Shelbe's name was crossed out and after the round table in which Brandi was banished, Anjelica found the note and shared it with Cirie who revealed it to a small group of the remaining contestants. Cirie dubbed it "Notegate".	
Pantygate	The Real Housewives of Beverly Hills	Season 7, Episode 4: "Pantygate"	New housewife Dorit Kemsley and her husband Paul pass judgments on Erika Girardi's decision not to wear underwear to a party with the housewives.	
Punchgate	Celebrity Big Brother (UK)	Series 22	Roxanne Pallett accused fellow housemate Ryan Thomas of deliberately and repeatedly punching her; she was criticized for exaggerating the light play fighting and has since called it a "horrible mistake" after leaving the house and seeing the footage.	
Puppygate	The Real Housewives of Beverly Hills	Season 9	Dorit Kemsley adopted a dog from Lisa Vanderpump's dog rescue, which was later returned to a different shelter in violation of the initial adoption agreement. The subsequent fallout eventually lead to Vanderpump's exit from the show.	
Safetypingate	RuPaul's Drag Race	Season 18, Episode 10: "Drag in a Bag"	Contestant Discord Addams uses 800 safety pins to embellish her outfit, but they were not provided in the suitcase of materials.	
Sharongate	EastEnders		Sharon (Letitia Dean) confessed on tape that she had slept with Phil (Steve McFadden), the brother of her husband Grant (Ross Kemp).	
Stargate	Community	"Contemporary American Poultry"	A newspaper uses the name in a headline after the character Star-Burns is accused of controlling a chicken finger-laundering scandal. The newspaper also clarifies that the title is a reference to Watergate, not the 1994 film Stargate.	
Strawberry-Gate	I'm a Celebrity... Get Me Out of Here!	UK series 17, Episode 11	Contestants Amir Khan and Iain Lee won the Dingo Dollar challenge receiving the opportunity for a reward; Chocolate coins or Strawberries & cream. Their campmates got the question right, and Amir and Iain were given Strawberries & cream. However, while returning to camp, they decided to eat the treat and pretend that the camp got the question wrong.	
"Stupid Watergate"	Last Week Tonight with John Oliver	Season 4, Episode 13 and Season 5, Episode 14	A recurring segment called "Stupid Watergate" is concerned with the appearance of Russian interference in the 2016 United States elections and resulting coverups. It is called "Stupid Watergate" because, according to Oliver, it is "a scandal with all the potential ramifications of Watergate, but where everyone involved is stupid and bad at everything".	
Tullegate	RuPaul's Drag Race	Season 3, Episode 11: "RuPaul's Hair Extravaganza"	The contestant Raja used tulle fabric in a challenge in which all the contestants had to design an outfit only using hair and wigs. This was alleged by other competitors Shangela, Alexis Mateo, and Yara Sofia, before Raja confirmed it on an episode of Untucked. In the Drag Race fan community, many fans refer to this as Tullegate.	
Waitergate	The Simpsons	Season 5, Episode 20: "The Boy Who Knew Too Much"	A court case surrounding a waiter who appeared to have been beaten by Freddy Quimby is named by the press as 'Beat-Up Waiter'. Anchorman Kent Brockman says he suggested calling the story 'Waitergate', but was "shouted down at the press club".	
Watergategate	That Mitchell and Webb Look	S01E02	Webb's character points out in one sketch that the original scandal that resulted in Nixon's resignation should actually be referred to retroactively as "Watergategate" as the popularisation of the -gate suffix means that "Watergate" should logically be reserved for a scandal involving water.	
Wiggate	RuPaul's Drag Race	Season 11: Episode 6 "The Draglympics", Episode 11 "Bring Back My Queens!"	Some of the remaining contestants fight over Ariel Versace's wigs which were left on set.	
