= Stickygate =

Stickygate may refer to:

- Stickygate, a controversy in the 2020 New York's 22nd congressional district election
- The 2021 sticky stuff controversy in Major League Baseball

== See also ==
- List of "-gate" scandals and controversies
