= Mike Torode =

Guernsey politician (1940 or 1941 – 2024)

Michael W. Torode (1940 or 1941 – 3 September 2024) was a Guernsey politician who was the second Chief Minister of Guernsey. The States of Deliberation voted him in on 5 March 2007 and his term expired on 30 April 2008.

Torode succeeded Laurie Morgan following the Fallagate scandal that led to the whole Policy Council of Guernsey resigning en masse in February 2007. Prior to becoming Chief Minister, Torode was Minister of Home Affairs.

Torode was a member of the States of Guernsey, the parliament of the Bailiwick of Guernsey, since 1979. He was initially a Deputy representing St. Martin and later a Conseiller, elected bailiwick-wide. He was later a deputy representing the South East electoral district.

Torode died on 3 September 2024, at the age of 83.
