= Waitangi dildo incident =

2016 protest incident in New Zealand

- Steven Joyce at the moment of impact
- Location: Waitangi
- Date: 5 February 2016; 10 years ago
- Target: MP Steven Joyce (New Zealand Minister of Economic Development)
- Attack type: Flung object
- Weapon: Rubber dog toy resembling a dildo
- Perpetrator: Josie Butler
- Motive: Opposition to the TPPA
- Charges: None laid

The Waitangi dildo incident occurred on 5 February 2016 in Waitangi, New Zealand, when protester Josie Butler flung what was referred to as a dildo (actually a penis-shaped squeaky toy) at Minister of Economic Development Steven Joyce, striking him in the face. The incident became international news, and was quoted and parodied in art, music, and television comedy.

== Background ==
Waitangi Day, New Zealand's national holiday, commemorates the signing of the Treaty of Waitangi between the British Crown and representatives of Māori on 6 February 1840. Because the Treaty of Waitangi was for many years ignored by European colonists, being declared "a simple nullity" in the 1877 Wi Parata v Bishop of Wellington judgement, Waitangi Day celebrations have frequently been a scene of political protest. Politicians attending have been jostled and heckled; mud was thrown at the Leader of the Opposition Don Brash in 2004, and the Prime Minister John Key was grabbed by two protestors in 2009.

In February 2016, New Zealand had just signed the 12-nation Trans-Pacific Partnership trade agreement (TPPA), which had been widely criticised by Māori as undermining the self-determination that was guaranteed to them by the Treaty of Waitangi. Prime Minister John Key wanted to respond to critics of the TPPA at Waitangi, but was told he would not be allowed to discuss politics on the marae. Two days before the Waitangi ceremonies, where a large anti-TPPA protest was promised, Key decided not to attend, and sent senior politician and Minister for Economic Development Steven Joyce as the government's representative.

== Event ==
While Joyce was speaking to reporters in the car park of the Copthorne Hotel on the day before the celebrations, Josie Butler, a Christchurch nurse, threw what appeared to be a dildo (in the form of a large flesh-toned rubber penis and testicles) at him. The dildo rebounded from Joyce's face, bouncing off the 1News reporter Helen Castles, who was interviewing him, and the moment was captured by her cameraman. Joyce, who was not harmed, responded by saying "Oh yes yes" and "Goodo". Butler, who was protesting New Zealand's signing of the TPPA, shouted "That’s for raping our sovereignty." She was arrested but later released without charge. Butler later explained that she was concerned about the TPPA's effect on the cost of medications for her patients; the significance of the dildo was not explained. She had originally intended to throw the object at PM John Key, who at the last minute did not attend the ceremonies. After hours walking around Waitangi, she saw Steven Joyce's media interview in the Copthorne car park, but did not recognise him and had to ask a police officer if he was from the National Party.

=== The dildo ===
Although the object thrown at Joyce was described by media at the time as a "dildo" or "sex toy", Butler later revealed it was actually a "dog's squeaky toy". It was chosen after she Googled "most effective form of protest" and learned about the 2008 Bush shoeing incident; a rubber toy was chosen as it was less likely to harm Joyce than a shoe, and she did not want to be charged with assault. Butler and her flatmates purchased the nine-inch "Squeaky Pecker" at adult store Peaches and Cream, and for weeks practised throwing at each other around the house.

Documentary-maker Hayden Donnell afterwards attempted to locate the dildo. As Butler was never charged with a crime, the dildo was not evidence; nevertheless, it had been confiscated by a police officer at the scene in case Joyce pressed charges. Donnell devoted the first episode of the show Get It to Te Papa to the hunt for the dildo, so it might be accessioned by the Museum of New Zealand Te Papa Tongarewa. He discovered through the Official Information Act that five days after the incident the police had thrown it away.

== Aftermath ==
The incident, at the time referred to as "dildogate" (using the "-gate" suffix, in common with other political controversies), became an international sensation. Joyce was briefly nicknamed "Dildo Baggins", a Lord of the Rings reference to Bilbo Baggins. Soon after the incident, Joyce tweeted, "Someone send the gif over to John Oliver so we can get it over with ..." (Oliver, a UK-US television comedian, was at the time repeatedly lampooning news from New Zealand.) Oliver, who declared the rest of Steven Joyce's life "will be viewed through a dildonic prism", responded with an extravagant segment on his show Last Week Tonight featuring a redesigned New Zealand flag (brandished by Peter Jackson and sporting Joyce's face and the dildo), a rain of dildos, performers in giant dildo costumes, and a choir singing about the incident to the tune of the Hallelujah Chorus. Joyce responded on Twitter: "Well that was actually pretty funny."

Years after the incident, Butler confessed she would "buy Steven Joyce a beer if I saw him today, because he sure took a dick to the face really well."
