= Leakgate (India) =

2015 scandal in India

Leakgate (also Filegate) was a 2015 scandal in India involving the theft and sale of official documents. According to the Central Bureau of Investigation, officials, including those with the Department of Economic Affairs and the Department of Investment and Public Asset Management (Note: At time the Department of Disinvestment, but renamed in 2016) allegedly stole documents related to foreign investments and sold them to a firm based in Mumbai, who passed the documents on to a number of private companies, including DLF Limitless Developers, HDFC Bank, Glenmark Pharmaceuticals, Infraline Energy Modril India, Prime Living, NovaLead Pharma, IndusInd Bank and Kakardi British Realty.

The ensuing investigation resulted in at least 20 arrests, and at least seven others being detained for questioning.

The documents included a classified report on the national gas grid; a letter from Principal Secretary to the Prime Minister of India, Nripendra Misra, to the Ministry of Petroleum and Natural Gas; drafts of global energy cooperation pacts between India and other countries including Sri Lanka; and sectoral budget proposals.

According to the Times of India, four individuals entered Shastri Bhawan, a government building in New Delhi after hours using forged identification and duplicate keys, disabled security cameras, and stole or photocopied documents which they then sold.

== See also ==
- List of scandals with "-gate" suffix
