= Squeaky toy =

Noise-making toy for humans or animals

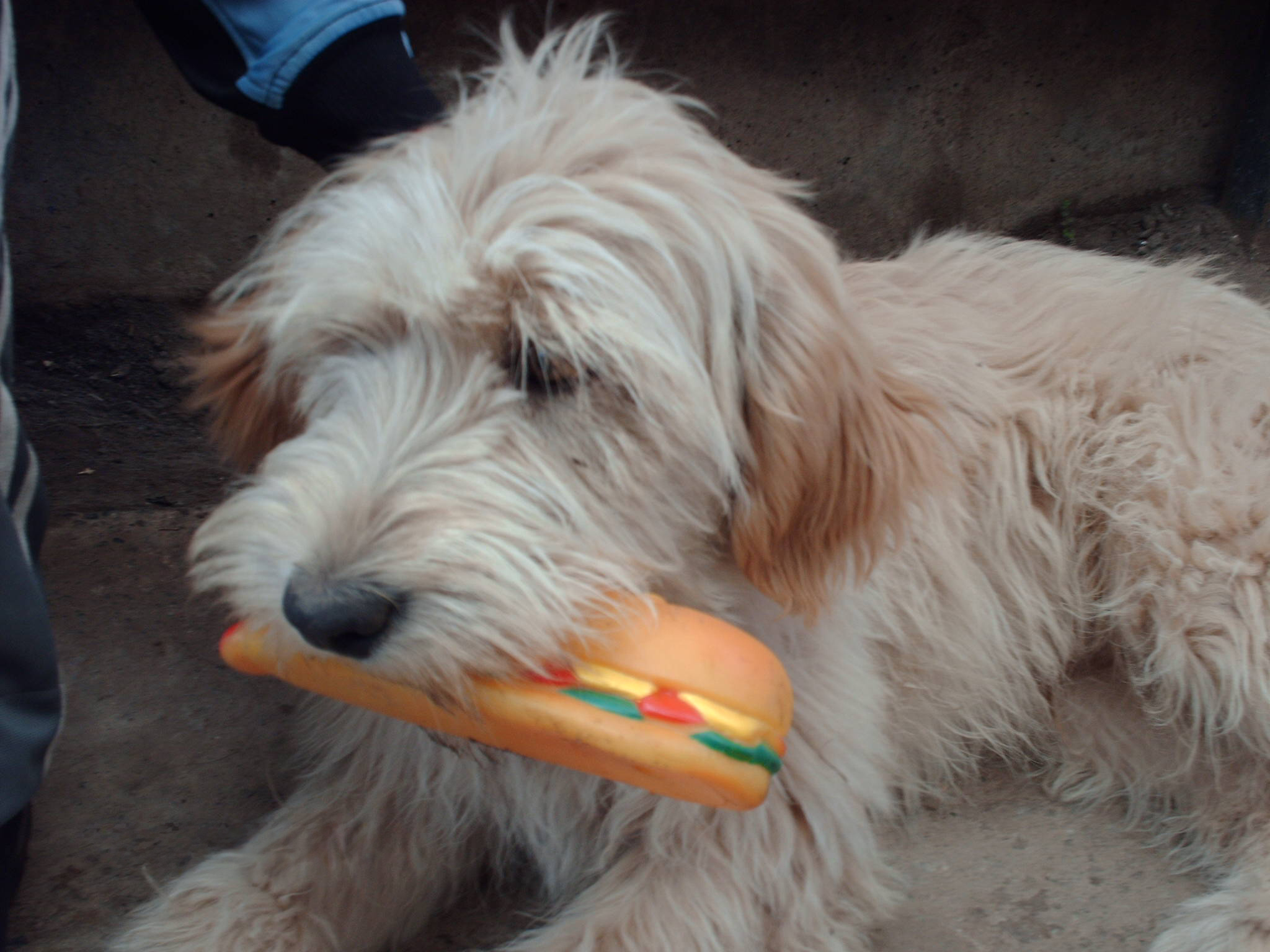
A dog with a squeaky toy in the shape of a sandwich

The squeaker of a rubber duck

A squeaky toy (also squeak toy, squeaker toy, or squeeze toy) is a soft, hollow toy made from flexible materials such as rubber or vinyl, and usually equipped with a small device known as a squeaker.

== Mechanism ==
When the toy is squeezed, air is forced through the squeaker, resulting in a high-pitched sound, such as a squeak, or the sound of a toy horn or whistle. The tone and duration of the sound may depend on the size of the squeaker, the amount of air squeezed out of the toy, and the speed with which it is squeezed. When the toy is not being squeezed, it resumes its normal shape and re-inflates. Air returning into the toy through the squeaker may or may not make a sound, depending on the design of the squeaker and the speed at which air re-enters.

The high-pitched noise produced by squeaky toys quickly attracts the attention of infants and small children, while their soft, squeezable nature makes them safe for young children to handle. Squeaky toys are also popular with pets, and examples shaped like bones or small furry animals are commonly marketed for dogs.

== History ==
Squeaky toys made of rubber first appeared in 1860. In the 1930s, technical advances made painting them easier. The first squeaky toys were simple rubber balls which produced a high pitched noise when air was squeezed through a hole, without a special noise maker. Later examples contained a metal noisemaker known as a "whistle disk." Brightly colored rubber squeaky toys molded in various shapes became common during the 1940s. Later examples were molded from durable vinyl, and plastic squeakers replaced metal whistles.

Squeaky toys may be modeled after popular cartoon characters, or used as promotional advertising. There are squeaky toy collectors, and published guides with typical selling prices.

== Comparisons to nature ==
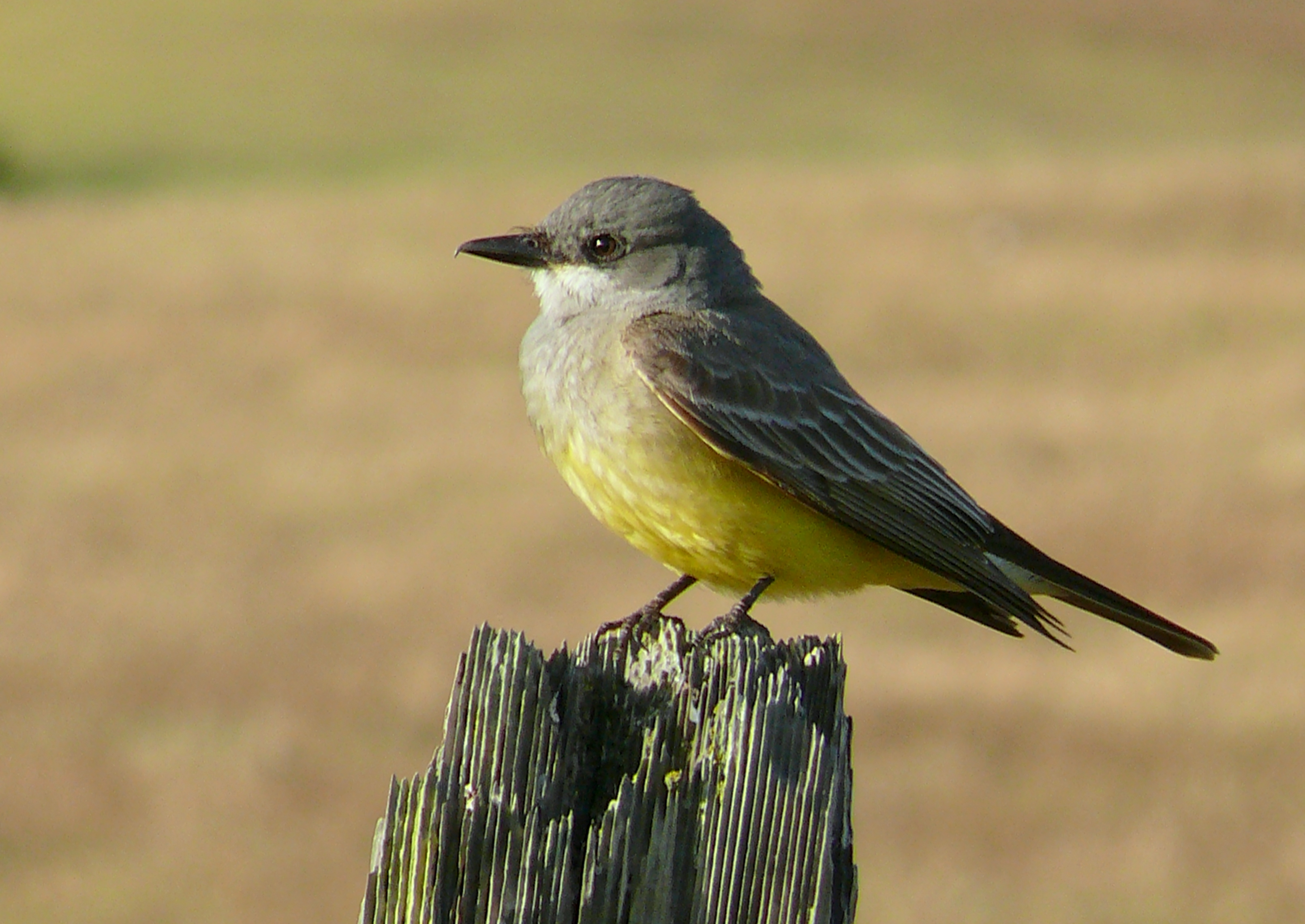
A western kingbird

Small animals are sometimes compared with squeaky toys. The desert rain frog, the subject of a widely viewed video titled "World's Cutest Frog", is regularly described as making a noise like a squeaky toy. The resemblance is enhanced by the fact that the frog vocalizes by inflating its body, and then exhaling as if being squeezed.

The calls of certain birds have also been compared to squeaky toys; in particular those of the western kingbird, Mississippi kite, and sulphur-bellied flycatcher of North America, and the blue nuthatch of southeast Asia.

== In popular culture ==
Several squeaky toys play prominent roles in Pixar's Toy Story movies. The three-eyed alien toys first encountered in the claw machine at Pizza Planet are squeaky toys; they appear in all four films, and rescue the other toys from an incinerator in Toy Story 3. Another squeaky toy character is Wheezy, a penguin with a broken squeaker in Toy Story 2. Consigned to a yard sale, his rescue by Woody sets in motion the remainder of the movie's plot.

Henry Dagg used squeaky toys in the shape of cats to build a "katklavier" (cat organ). This unusual instrument came to public attention in 2010, when Dagg used it to perform "Over the Rainbow" at a charity event held by Prince Charles. Both the Prince and the Duchess of Cornwall were reduced to tears of laughter by the performance.

A squeaky toy resembling a dildo was featured in international news after being thrown against Steven Joyce, then-Minister of Economic Development of New Zealand, during an improvised press conference in 2016. The incident was an anti-Trans-Pacific Partnership act of protest, and the "Squeaky Pecker" gained cultural resonance beyond news coverage.
