= Pandora Gate =

Polish child sexual abuse scandal

Pandora Gate is a child grooming and sexual abuse scandal involving several Polish YouTubers and influencers. The scandal was uncovered after YouTubers Sylwester Wardęga and Mikołaj Tylko (also known as Konopskyy) published videos alleging that YouTuber Stuart Burton had sent sexually explicit messages to an underage girl. The name of the scandal is a portmanteau of Pandora and Watergate.

== Background ==
Stuart Burton, known online as Stuu, is a British YouTuber based in Poland with over 4,500,000 subscribers. He had previously been accused of inappropriate behaviour toward women by his former girlfriend, Justyna Sukanek, but her allegations received little attention. Sukanek was also criticized by Burton's friend Marcin Dubiel, who said that she was attempting to ruin Burton's reputation.

== Scandal ==
On 3 October 2023, Sylwester Wardęga published a video titled "Dark Secrets of Stuu and Youtubers: Pandora Gate", in which he presented evidence alleging that Burton had communicated with underage girls. The video also alleged that Marcin Dubiel was aware of Burton's conduct and included claims regarding YouTuber Michał Baron, known online as Boxdel. Two days later, Konopskyy published his own video, "Dark Past of Polish YouTube", presenting additional information about the scandal.

In October 2023, Burton was arrested in the United Kingdom after Interpol notice. The alleged offences included two counts of sexual activity with girls under the age of 15, one alleged to have taken place in 2015 and the other in 2018.

The scandal received widespread attention in Poland and prompted responses from politicians, including (now former) Prime Minister Mateusz Morawiecki, (now former) Minister of Justice Zbigniew Ziobro, and opposition leader Donald Tusk.

== Legal proceedings ==
In February 2024, Marcin Dubiel sued Sylwester Wardęga for defamation. In April 2025, the Mława Regional Court found Wardęga guilty. Wardęga appealed the ruling, but on 4 February 2026, the regional court in Płock upheld the previous decision.

After Burton left for the United Kingdom, a Polish court submitted an extradition request to the UK Ministry of Justice. In July 2026, after Burton lost his second appeal, the extradition order was upheld.

On 9 July 2026, Polish YouTuber Vojtaz was accused of presenting pornographic content to minors.

== See also ==
- List of -gate scandals and controversies
