= Iraqgate (disambiguation) =

Iraqgate refers to allegations that Presidents Ronald Reagan and George H. W. Bush built up Iraq's military right up until Saddam Hussein's invasion of Kuwait in 1990.

It may also refer to:

- Iraq leak
- Allegations of misappropriations related to the Iraq War
- Banca Nazionale del Lavoro § Scandals
