= Namagate =

Political scandal in Ireland

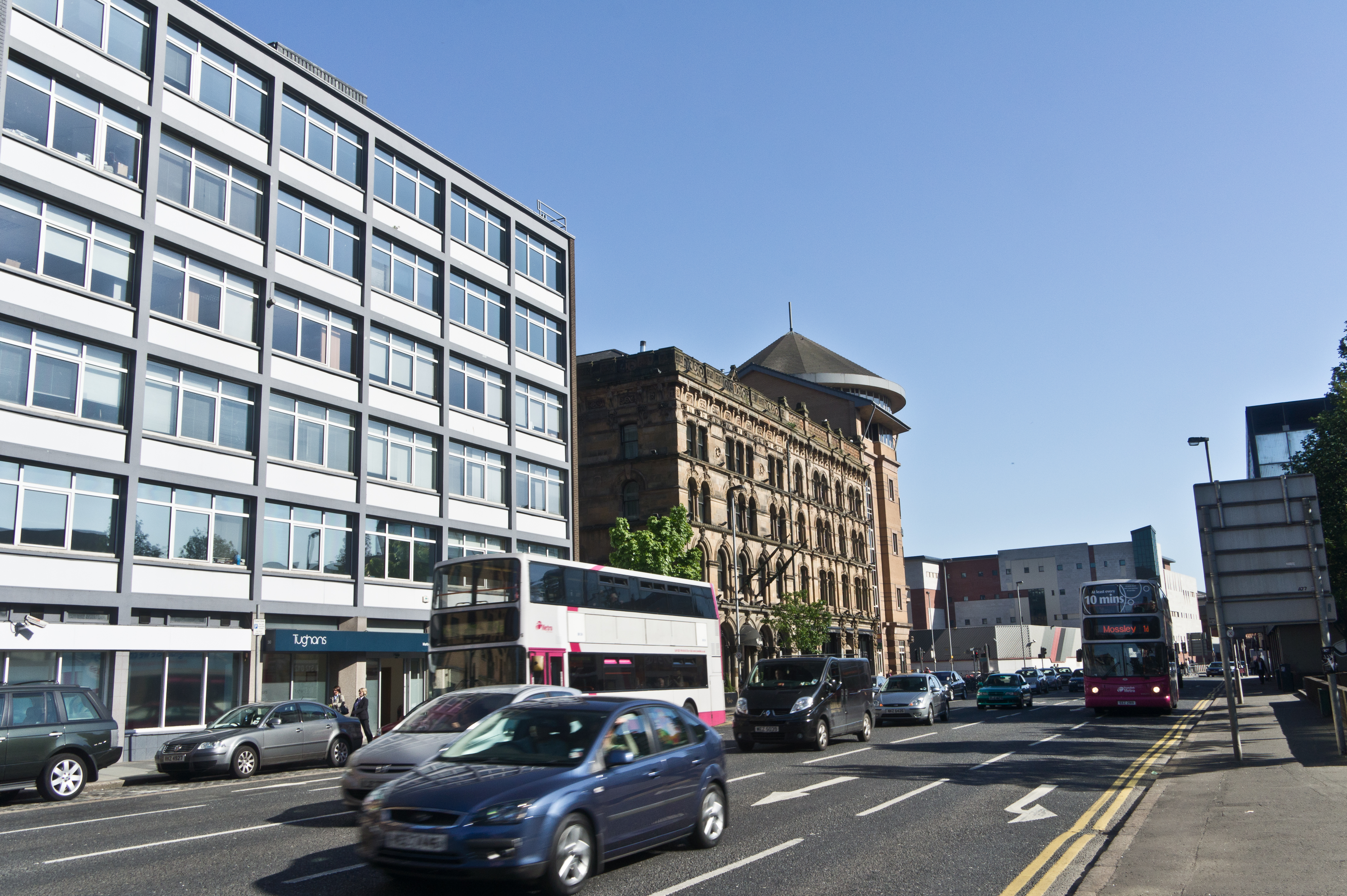
The offices of Tughans solicitors at the time of the scandal

Namagate is a political corruption scandal. The alleged corruption surrounds the sale of a portfolio of loans by the National Asset Management Agency (Nama) in April 2014.

== Project Eagle ==
'Project Eagle' was the name Nama gave to their sale of a portfolio of Northern Irish loans and properties. The portfolio was originally worth £4.5bn, but it was bought from Irish banks by Nama for £1.1bn after the Irish financial crisis. The sale was completed in June 2014, with the portfolio being sold to Cerberus Capital Management for £1.3bn.

Cerberus won the bid after Pacific Investment Management Company (PIMCO) withdrew their bid upon realising that a former Nama adviser, Frank Cushnahan (who had resigned from that role in November 2013) was in line for a £5m payment upon the completion of the sale. Ian Coulter, a managing partner of Tugans (a law firm based in Belfast that was working for PIMCO), was also set to benefit from the sale.

Despite learning of these planned payments, Nama did not suspend the sales process, and the portfolio was subsequently bought by Cerberus, who was also represented by Tughans. Commenting upon this in a Public Accounts Committee hearing, Sinn Féin TD, Mary Lou McDonald said the following:

"...you [Nama] take out the purchaser [PIMCO]. That identity changes but lo and behold you've the same cast of characters in and about the final decision."

== Mick Wallace's claims ==
On 2 July 2015, independent TD, Mick Wallace, speaking under parliamentary privilege in the Dáil Éireann, claimed that Tughans had put £7m in an Isle of Man bank account after the Project Eagle sale, and that it was "earmarked for a Northern Ireland politician". Wallace has since expanded on these claims, adding that "a Nama insider" helped ensure that Cerberus' bid won. Wallace claims that he has been threatened by Cerberus on account of the allegations he made.

In September 2015, Wallace further alleged that a further £45m had been set aside in "fixer fees" and that the £7m earmarked for a Northern Ireland politician was "only for openers".
