= 2021 sticky stuff controversy =

Use of grip enhancers in Major League Baseball

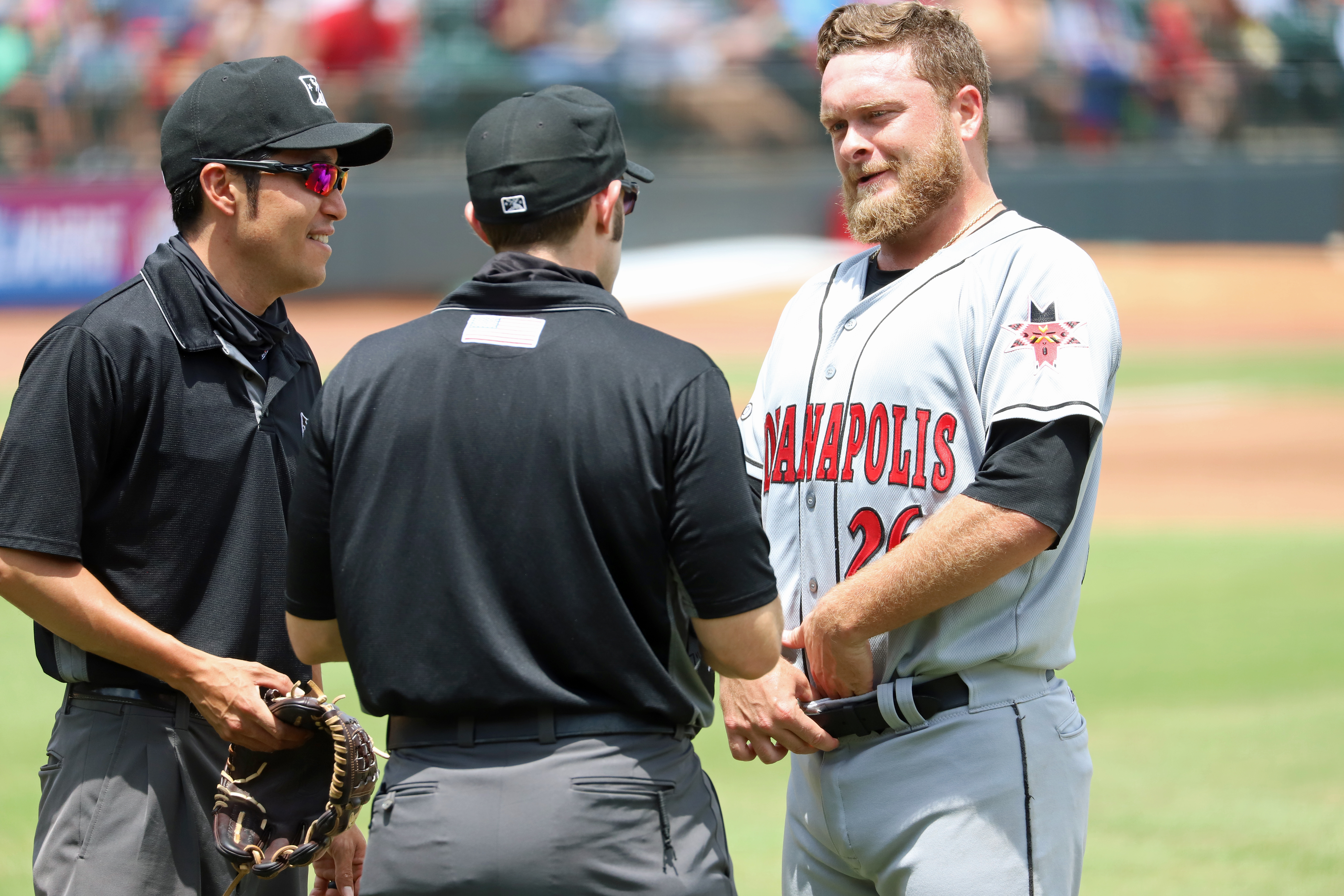
Beau Sulser of the Indianapolis Indians submits to a random, routine check for foreign substances after an inning of a game on June 27, 2021.

The 2021 sticky stuff controversy arose in Major League Baseball (MLB) around pitchers' use of foreign substances, such as the resin-based Spider Tack, to improve their grip on the baseball and the spin rate on their pitches. On June 15, 2021, MLB announced a new policy whereby any player caught using foreign substances on baseballs would receive a 10-game suspension. The policy also included umpire inspections of all pitchers during games starting on June 21, a decision that was met with mixed reactions from players and coaches.

== Background ==
Throughout the history of Major League Baseball (MLB), pitchers have used various methods of "doctoring" the baseball, using foreign substances or physically altering the shape of the ball to increase a certain aspect. An early example would be the spitball, which was popularized by Elmer Stricklett in the early 1900s. The spitball was formally banned in 1920, after Ray Chapman was struck in the head and killed by one such pitch. Another historical method of doctoring pitches included the emery ball, in which sandpaper or an emery board was used to scuff one side of a ball and change its flight pattern. In 2012, Tampa Bay Rays pitcher Joel Peralta came under fire when he was found to be using pine tar to improve his grip while pitching. Peralta was caught using pine tar in his glove during a game against the Washington Nationals, was expelled from the game, and received an additional eight-game suspension. Peralta argued that he had been using the pine tar for batting practice, where the substance is allowed for help gripping the bat, and that "It's not like I'm using pine tar my whole career".

In 2009, professional strength athletes James Deffinbaugh and Michael Caruso began working on a substance that would allow weightlifters and bodybuilders to better grip the large, awkwardly-shaped lifting stones used during World's Strongest Man competitions. They developed a resin-based substance that the pair began marketing commercially in 2010 as Spider Tack. In addition to strongman competitions, Spider Tack became popular in the wheelchair sports community, as the tackiness of the substance helped athletes maintain their grip on the wheels of their chair.

== Usage ==
The use of Spider Tack and other foreign substances was first openly discussed in February 2020, when Trevor Bauer, then playing with the Cincinnati Reds, spoke to HBO's Real Sports with Bryant Gumbel about how he "would guess 70 percent of the pitchers in the league use some sort of technically illegal substance on the ball". MLB undertook an informal poll during the 2020–21 offseason, during which they found that a majority of field managers considered foreign substances to be the most urgent issue in the sport. At the beginning of the 2021 MLB season, umpires and other officials collected baseballs from teams and analyzed them in an independent laboratory.

Simultaneously, the league-wide batting average at the start of the 2021 season was .237, the lowest that it had been since 1968. There were, on average, 8.98 strikeouts per team per game, the highest in MLB history, and pitchers had thrown six no-hitters by June 12. By mid May 2021, several batters began speaking out against the use of Spider Tack and other sticky substances.

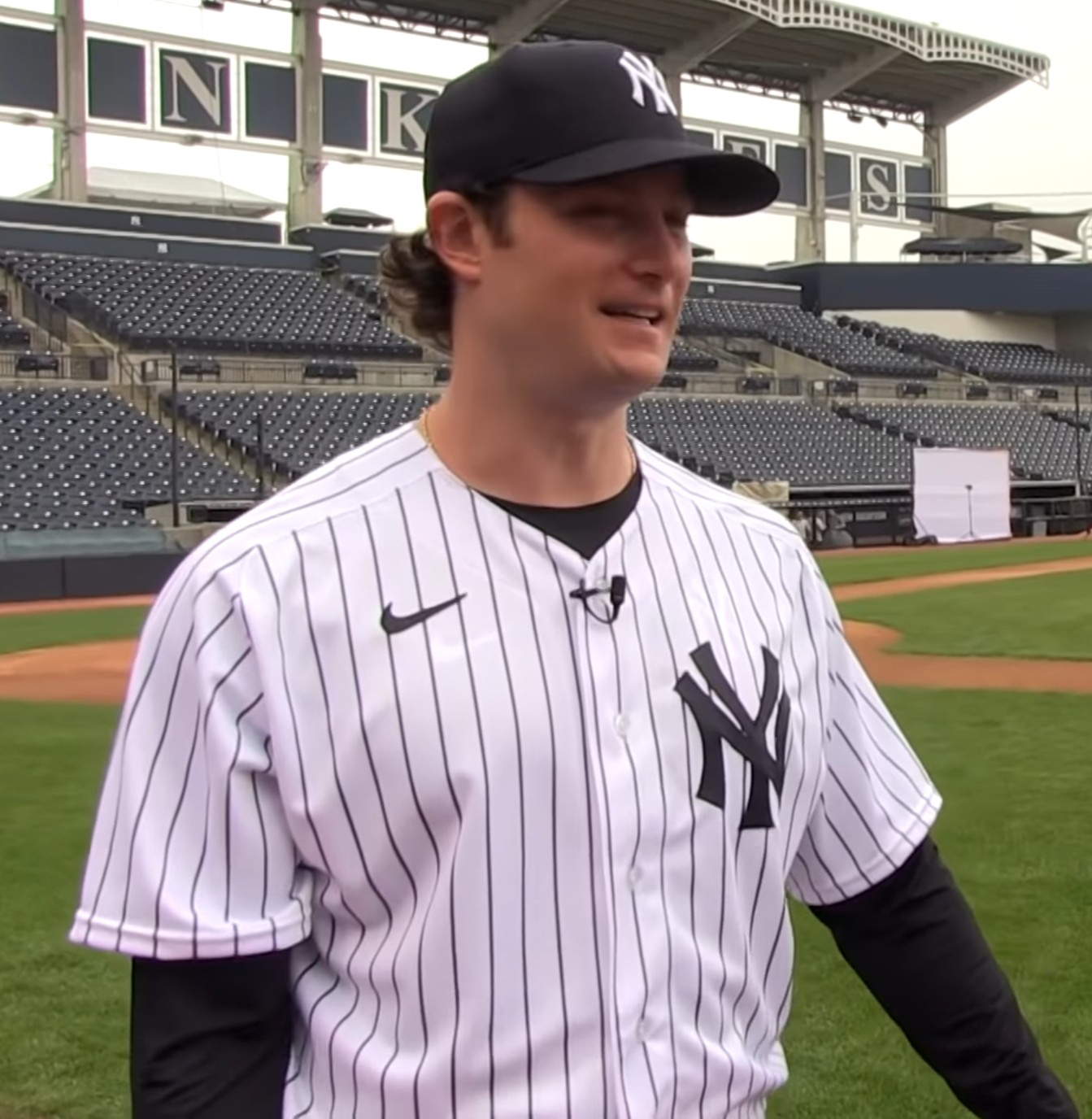
New York Yankees pitcher Gerrit Cole's comments on Spider Tack placed him at the center of the controversy.

On June 5, 2021, third baseman Josh Donaldson of the Minnesota Twins accused New York Yankees pitcher Gerrit Cole of using Spider Tack. He noted that, in Cole's first start after MLB announced a crackdown on foreign substances, the spin rate on Cole's pitches dropped by up to 125 RPM. He asked The Athletic, "Is it coincidence that Gerrit Cole's spin rate numbers went down (Thursday) after four minor leaguers got suspended for 10 games?" On June 8, during a Zoom conference after a game, Cole was asked directly whether he had ever used Spider Tack, to which the pitcher said, "I don't quite know how to answer that, to be honest." Cole was one of a handful of pitchers named in a lawsuit by Los Angeles Angels visiting clubhouse manager Bubba Harkins, who claimed that several players had ordered tins of homemade tacky substance from Harkins. After the press conference, Cole clarified that his hesitation was because he did not believe that Zoom was the appropriate forum to discuss the issue. Meanwhile, his Yankees teammate Jameson Taillon admitted that he had tried Spider Tack while recovering from Tommy John surgery, but that he had struggled to pitch with the substance and thus no longer uses it.

Donaldson threatened to expose "an entire catalog of cheating videos" of pitchers that he believed to be using foreign substances, before telling reporters that he wanted umpires to check "every half-inning" for non-compliance. A video from Hey_Commy, entitled “Josh Donaldson’s cheating catalogue” went viral on TikTok later that week. J. T. Realmuto, the starting catcher for the Philadelphia Phillies, also spoke out against the use of Spider Tack and pine tar, telling The Philadelphia Inquirer, "I think if they cracked down on that, that would honestly help the offense a lot, get the ball in play more often, and less swing and miss."

== Enforcement ==
On June 15, 2021, MLB issued a press release announcing new guidance regarding "a uniform standard for the consistent application of the rules, including regular checks of all pitchers regardless of whether an opposing club's manager makes a request". Included in MLB's announcement was a mandate for routine, random checks of all pitchers by umpires in the Major and Minor Leagues, with any player found to have a foreign substance immediately ejected and suspended for 10 games. The rosin bags that are placed behind the pitching mound were allowed to remain, but pitchers were not allowed to combine rosin with other substances, such as sunscreen. Enforcement across MLB began on June 21.

On June 26, Seattle Mariners left-hander Hector Santiago became the first player ejected under MLB's heightened enforcement, after umpires discovered a foreign substance on his glove. Both Santiago and Mariners manager Scott Servais said that Santiago was only using rosin, which is allowed, and that it had become sticky when mixed with his sweat. MLB announced a 10-game suspension for Santiago on June 29, which Santiago appealed. Caleb Smith of the Arizona Diamondbacks was the second pitcher to be suspended under the new policy; umpires found suspicious material inside Smith's glove on August 18, during a game against the Phillies. He appealed the suspension, arguing that the substance was an accidental combination of rosin and dirt. Under the new policy, Smith would have faced a suspension regardless.

== Reaction ==
Some individuals have argued against MLB's blanket ban on grip-enhancing substances. After Phillies pitcher Vince Velasquez lost control of a pitch, fracturing Washington Nationals pitcher Austin Voth's nose as a result, Nationals manager Dave Martinez argued that the injury could have been prevented had Velasquez been allowed to use a substance to increase his grip. Martinez told reporters, "I understand them trying to clean some stuff up. But it's hot, it's slippery, it's sweaty. I know Velasquez didn't throw in there intentionally, but I'm afraid that if we don't come up with something unified for everybody, you'll see a lot more of that." Tyler Glasnow, a pitcher for the Tampa Bay Rays who openly admitted to using a mixture of sunscreen and rosin to improve his grip on the baseball, blamed the MLB crackdown on such substances for his season-ending ulnar collateral ligament injury. Nationals general manager Mike Rizzo called Glasnow "courageous" for admitting to using grip-enhancing techniques and criticized MLB for the sudden ban.

The process of being checked for sticky substances has been met with scrutiny. Dodgers pitcher Clayton Kershaw suggested that an opposing manager should face punishment if he requests a substance check and the pitcher is clean, while Oakland Athletics reliever Sergio Romo, frustrated with the regular checks for foreign substances, dropped his pants in protest. Most notably, Phillies manager Joe Girardi and Nationals pitcher Max Scherzer clashed when Girardi requested that umpires perform a substance check on Scherzer. Girardi was ultimately ejected from the game.

== See also ==
- Pine Tar Incident – a 1983 incident involving pine tar used on a bat
