= Fallagate =

Political scandal in Guernsey in 2007

Fallagate was a political scandal in Guernsey in 2007 over the desire by Deputies of the States of Deliberation to appear corruption free. The desire to appear corruption-free cost the island's 40,000 taxpayers £60 each, and the resulting scandal led to the resignation of Laurie Morgan, the then Chief Minister of Guernsey, and the Policy Council, a committee of the States.

== Background ==
=== Tender for Princess Elizabeth Hospital extension ===
The States of Guernsey put out a tender to build an extension on the Princess Elizabeth Hospital in St. Andrew. Several firms put in tenders, including R.G. Falla Ltd, Guernsey's largest builder, whose bid was the cheapest by £2.4 million.

=== Stuart Falla ===
Stuart Falla took over his father's construction company, R. G. Falla Ltd, in the 1980s and has been a shareholder since. In 2004 Falla was elected as one of the Deputies to the States of Deliberation for the parish of Castel, and became the minister for commerce and employment.

== Conflict of interest ==
Due to an apparent conflict of interest between his position as a Deputy, and his part ownership of R. G. Falla, Stuart Falla chose not to attend a committee meeting to discuss which bid would get the contract to build the hospital extension. At the time of the meeting, R. G. Falla was the preferred tender at £25 million, costing £2.4 million less than the next best quote.

But when the conflict of interest was pointed out, senior Deputies pressured Stuart Falla, a recently elected Deputy of the States, to either resign his seat or withdraw his bid. R. G. Falla subsequently withdrew its tender. The contract was then awarded to the next best quote, costing the States £2.4 million.
