= Concerns and controversies at the 2026 Winter Olympics =

Multi-sport event in Italy

Ahead of and during the 2026 Winter Olympics, there were various concerns and controversies.

== Corruption allegations and scandals ==
On 21 May 2024, the Guardia di Finanza raided the offices of Fondazione Milano Cortina 2026 (Milano Cortina 2026 Foundation), Quibyt and Deloitte for alleged irregularities over the selection of certain sponsors, such as bid-rigging, irregular payments and uncertain validity over relationships between the Milano Cortina Foundation officials. The investigations mainly concern Deloitte and accusations of corruption and bid-rigging against three people. In July 2025, the Prosecutor's Office of Milan started an investigation into alleged corruption regarding the public works tender for the Milan Olympic Village. 74 individuals including Milan Mayor Giuseppe Sala were investigated for offenses such as corruption, forgery or abuse of public office.

According to reports by the media, the accused are alleged to have boasted of their friendship with Fabrizio Piscitelli, former leader of the Irriducibili (a Lazio football club ultras group with mafia links), who was murdered in a Rome park in 2019. The reputation of the Irriducibili as a violent association football group helped them present themselves as influential figures within Rome's criminal underworld. The investigation, disclosed by the Venice prosecutor's office, details how two brothers from Rome, linked to the Irriducibili, were arrested after trying to illegally obtain contracts related to Olympic construction works.

In November 2025, the Milan Court of the preliminary investigations judge (GIP) referred a question of constitutional legitimacy to the Constitutional Court of Italy concerning Article 11 of Decree-Law No. 76 of 11 June 2024 (converted into Law No. 111 of 8 August 2024) — a provision widely described in Italian media as the "Save the Olympics" decree — which states that the activities of the Fondazione Milano Cortina 2026 are not governed by public-law rules and that the foundation is not a "body governed by public law". The Milan Court raised concerns about the constitutionality of a Meloni government decree intended to shield the Milano Cortina Foundation from investigations into alleged bid rigging and corruption scandals.

== Infrastructural and venue issues ==
=== Sliding sports venue ===
During the bidding process, the Meloni government proposed to restore the Eugenio Monti Olympic Track in Cortina (used during the 1956 Winter Olympics), to be relaunched as a federal centre also for sledding and skeleton, despite opposition from the International Olympic Committee (IOC). The project has received criticism from environmental groups due to the planned felling of 20,000 square metres (220,000 sq ft) of larch forest. The minimum cost of restoring the closed track was initially estimated at €14 million, while in the official Milan-Cortina bid dossier the cost indicated was €100 million (similar budget needed to build the Cesana Pariol track used at the 2006 Winter Olympics). After initially forecasting an expenditure of €40‍–‍50 million, the Veneto region allocated funding up to €85 million to build the new Olympic venues. An annual expenditure of €400,000 was also planned for the management of the facility, which would be open four months a year, to be settled through the establishment of €8 million fund.

Due to the rising cost of construction materials, the Veneto region president Luca Zaia said in February 2023 that the restoring cost for the Eugenio Monti track could be upwards of €120 million. Calling for tenders to award the work, no company came forward with a bid by the 31 July 2023 deadline; even after that, no company interested in carrying out the work could be found, both for economic reasons and because of the difficulty to complete all works before the start of the Olympics. Due to critical issues, costs and prohibitive times for the total renovation of Cortina track, the mayor of Innsbruck, Austria, made a proposal for the use of the Igls Olympic Sliding Centre in Innsbruck.

On 16 October 2023 the Italian National Olympic Committee (CONI) announced that the track would not be rebuilt to host the 2026 Olympic Winter Games, and the sliding events could be held outside of Italy. The Italian government wanted the sliding events to remain in Italy, so they studied the possibility of revamping the Cesana Pariol track which hosted the events at the 2006 Winter Olympics, which has been dormant since 2011. Since then, several construction companies have submitted bids to study a potential reconstruction of the Eugenio Monti track. A bid was won to build a new sliding track (Cortina Sliding Centre) instead of rebuilding the Eugenio Monti track, which was demolished.

Despite concerns about the new track not being ready on time, it was confirmed in September 2024 that the new Eugenio Monti track was on schedule, and that homologation of the track was expected by March 2025. In March 2025, the venue's first tests were held. Mt. Van Hoevenberg Olympic Bobsled Run in Lake Placid, United States, was selected as the back-up venue for the sliding events. Venues in Austria (Olympic Sliding Centre Innsbruck in Igls) and Switzerland (St. Moritz-Celerina Olympic Bobrun in St. Moritz) were previously discussed as backup sites.

In late 2025, international training periods were planned by the International Bobsleigh and Skeleton Federation (IBSF) and the International Luge Federation (FIL) to allow all internationally competing athletes to learn and train on the new track well ahead of the Olympic Games. Luge athletes were expected to begin this training on 27 October 2025. Bobsleigh and skeleton athletes had a planned training block from 7 to 16 November, immediately followed by the opening week of the Bobsleigh World Cup, where further training and official racing took place from 17 to 23 November. The athletes were scheduled to return to Cortina in the days leading up to the 2026 Games for a final training period prior to the start of the Olympic competition.

=== Ice hockey venue delays ===
The construction of the main ice hockey venue, Milano Santa Giulia Ice Hockey Arena, faced notable delays and concerns over rink size, leading to criticism from the NHL. IIHF president Luc Tardif announced in January 2026 that the stands would not be completed on time, leading to reduced capacity, but assured that the rink and player facilities would be ready. At the end of January, organisers admitted that the venue was not going to be fully complete in time, despite the IOC's Games executive director, Christophe Dubi, saying it was "absolutely certain" it would be ready.

== South Tyrol venue naming dispute ==
Ahead of the Games, organizations in South Tyrol led by the Südtiroler Schützenbund, criticized that all signage around the Antholz/Anterselva biathlon venue was in Italian (and English) only, even though signage in bilingual South Tyrol must, by law, be in German and Italian, and also that the venue was referred to in promotional materials only by its Italian name. As a consequence, some signage was exchanged, and during the Games, the venue was mostly identified as Antholz/Anterselva in video graphics and official Olympics texts.

== Security concerns ==
=== Trial for the death of a security guard ===
During the night of 7–8 January 2026, security guard Pietro Zantonini was found dead of exposure near the arena construction site in Cortina. The Belluno Public Prosecutor's Office has opened an investigation into the worker's working conditions by S.S. Security & Bodyguard.

=== No-fly zones and Russian cyberattacks ===
In January 2026, U.S. and Italian security teams flagged the risk of "lone actor" drone attacks, similar to those seen in recent global conflicts. No-fly zones are strictly enforced over all venues. Researchers (such as Palo Alto Networks) have warned of state-sponsored "killware" and phishing campaigns targeting ticketing systems and athletes' personal data. In February 2026, days before the opening ceremonies, Italian officials were reported to have foiled Russian cyberattacks aimed at disrupting the Games.

=== Presence of ICE security officers ===
On 17 January 2026, the second Trump administration confirmed that the U.S. Department of State's Diplomatic Security Service (DSS) would deploy United States Immigration and Customs Enforcement (ICE)'s Homeland Security Investigations division "to vet and mitigate risks from transnational criminal organisations". ICE was similarly involved in past major sports events "as part of international partnerships related to human trafficking and drug trafficking". On 24 January 2026, as reported by the Italian newspaper Il Fatto Quotidiano, ICE agents were already permanently stationed at the U.S. Embassy in Rome.

The news sparked protests from both Italian citizens and opposition parties to the right-wing-to-far-right coalition government led by Giorgia Meloni of Brothers of Italy (FdI), accusing it of favouring the introduction of foreign military forces that use "brutal methods" against the population. The event was also supported by the 2026 Minnesota general strike, which began following the killing of American citizens Renée Good and Alex Pretti by ICE agents, against the FdI's policy. During the protests, Italian public broadcaster RAI aired a video of ICE agents threatening to break the window of the vehicle its crew were using to report in Minneapolis.

Matteo Piantedosi, the Italian minister of the interior, regarding the alleged presence of the forces, did not confirm and minimised it, stating: "We are not aware of this at the moment, but foreign delegations choose who to turn to in order to ensure their own security. I don't see what the problem is. Security coordination remains the responsibility of the national authorities." The Department of Homeland Security (DHS) stated that "all security operations remain under Italian authority" and "ICE does not conduct immigration enforcement operations in foreign countries." A petition campaign to prevent agents from entering Italian territory was launched on Change.org. On the opening day of the Olympics, protests were held against the presence of ICE agents in Milan and against the Trump administration. Some spectators booed JD Vance during the opening ceremony. U.S. Olympic officials announced they would change the name of their assigned hospitality space from "Ice House" to the "Winter House" to avoid a reference to the agency.

=== Presence of Qatari security forces ===
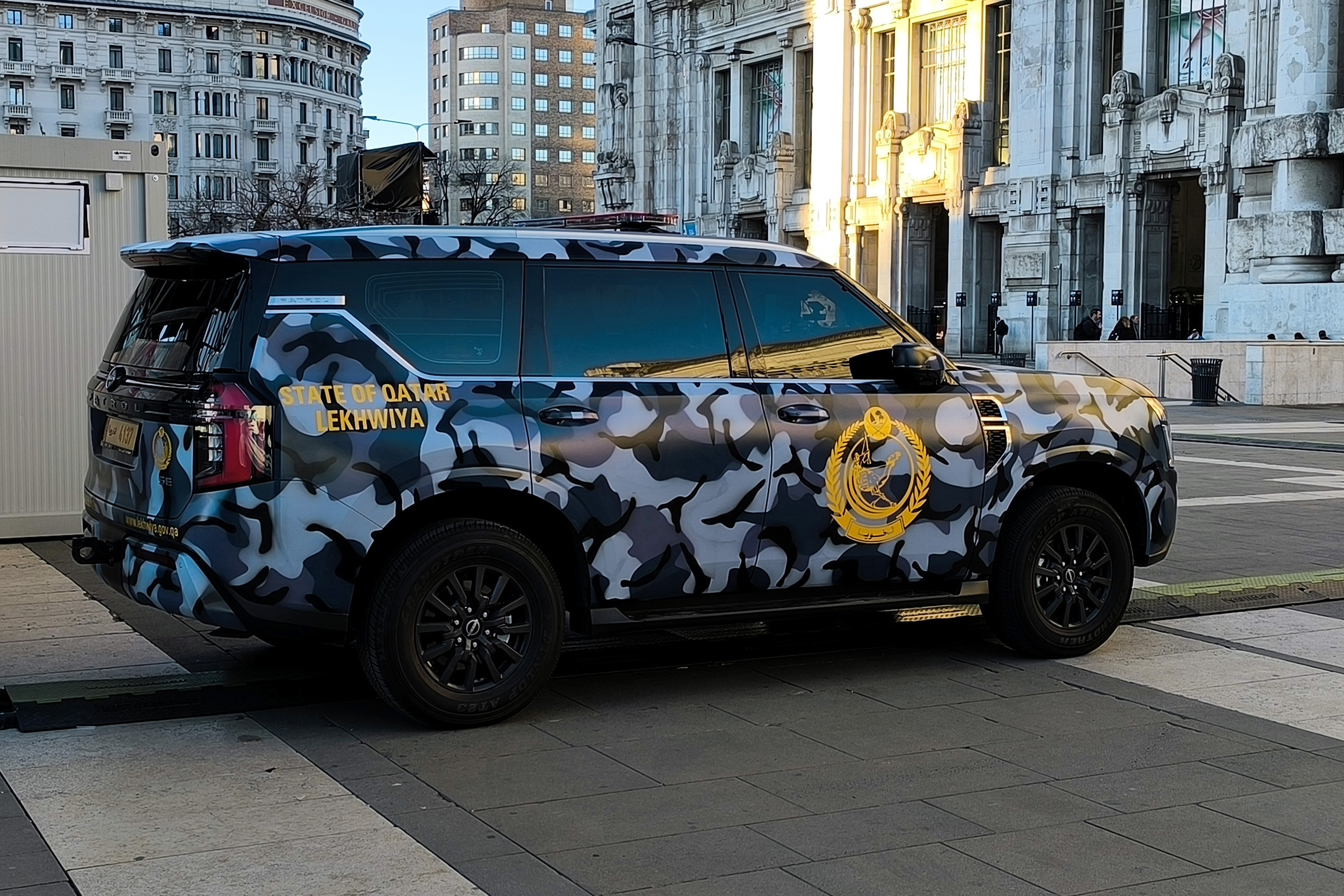
Qatari police car at Milano Centrale train station, brought in as reinforcement during the 2026 Olympic Games

Although Qatar has never sent athletes to any Winter Olympics, numerous Qatari police vehicles have been spotted in Milan. Officially, Qatari Lekhwiya, the elite security forces, and the Qatari police sent more than 100 officers (including about 20 women) to Italy to participate in security for the Olympics, along with more than 20 special vehicles (from Nissan Patrols to Stark Motor's mammoth Thunders) and 3 snowmobiles. Some Qatari security forces personnel also took part in a winter training course on snowy environments and skiing operations, conducted in collaboration with the Carabinieri in Selva di Val Gardena. According to a source at the Italian interior ministry, the Qatari security force was involved "mainly in a training" capacity. On 28 January, it was reported that a Qatari plane carrying 104 security personnel and heavy equipment slightly hit and damaged a lighting tower in Milan's Malpensa Airport while making a "wrong maneuver" during landing. Despite the incident, the welcome ceremony prepared for the passengers still took place. The Guardian reported that "any controversy over the Qatari involvement has so far been mute."

== Opening ceremony commentary on RAI ==
The commentary of the opening ceremony aired by Italian broadcaster RAI was heavily criticized. Numerous gaffes were made by director Paolo Petrecca; in addition to speaking over images and the other two commentators, Fabio Genovesi and Stefania Belmondo, Petrecca confused actress Matilda De Angelis with singer Mariah Carey, mistook IOC president Kirsty Coventry for President Sergio Mattarella's daughter, made offensive comments during the athletes' parade, and failed to recognize the Olympic champions of the women's national volleyball team (with the exception of Paola Egonu). Rai Sport journalists announced that, in protest against Petrecca's commentary, they would withdraw their signatures from their reports, links, and commentary from 5:00 p.m. on Monday, February 9, until the end of the Olympic Games; they will then go on strike for three days. The editorial board, the internal journalists' representation, has requested that the union statement be read during the Olympic news broadcasts and on the programs "Mattina Olimpica" and "Notti Olimpiche." The CEO of RAI asked him to take responsibility for both the commentary of the Olympic opening ceremony and for the tense relations with the editorial staff. On 19 February, Petrecca handed back his mandate to Rai CEO Giampaolo Rossi, announcing that he would be leaving his post at the end of the Olympic Games.

== Participation of controversial nations ==
=== Participation of Iranian athletes ===
In January 2026, multiple Iranian athletes were killed during the 2026 Iran massacres amid the 2025–2026 Iranian protests, including former Tractor Sazi midfielder Mojtaba Tarshiz. Following the massacres, activists called on FIFA and the IOC to ban the Iranian teams from the 2026 FIFA World Cup and the 2026 Winter Olympics.

=== Participation of Israeli athletes ===
Protesters accused Olympic organisers of having double standards, arguing that if Russian athletes are barred due to their country's war crimes, then Israel should also not be allowed to parade their flag, citing what they described as genocide and apartheid in relation to Israel's conduct in Gaza. The Palestinian NOC stated that Israel's actions in Gaza amounted to crimes of genocide and ethnic cleansing, and the IOC's decision shows there are "international institutions that insist on applying double standards and not adhering to the Olympic Charter, laws and regulations, or morals". The Israeli team was booed during the opening ceremonies. The IOC said that the situations are not comparable. Russia was barred following its 2022 invasion of Ukraine, which is a violation of the Olympic Truce and Ukraine's territorial integrity as a member National Olympic Committee. An IOC spokesperson stated that their organisation "deeply believes that differences between nations must be resolved through dialogue, not violence", and is beyond their "remit to react to any conflict or war situation between countries", which it regards as "the pure realm of politics". During the Israeli team's run in the bobsleigh event, RTS commentator Stefan Renna criticized Adam Edelman for his support of the Gaza genocide, noting that Edelman had described himself on social media as a “Zionist to the core” and the Gaza War as “the most morally just war in history.” Renna used the term “genocide” to describe the Gaza War, citing the UN Human Rights Council’s Commission of Inquiry. “Renna cited the IOC Charter, which states that athletes who have actively supported the war by participating in pro-war events, expressing such views on social media, or being actively conscripted by the military are not permitted to participate in the Olympic Games—this applied, at least, to Russian athletes.” In a statement, RTS clarified: “Our journalist intended to address the IOC’s policy based on statements made by the athlete in question. Although this is factual information, it is inappropriate in the context of a sports commentary because it is too detailed”.

=== Participation of Russian and Belarusian athletes ===
Latvian Public Media, which is a part of the Public Broadcasting of Latvia, announced it would not cover the participation of athletes from Russia and Belarus (competing as Individual Neutral Athletes, or AIN), including their individual events. Instead, live broadcasts will feature advertisements, interviews with Latvian athletes, or other content. Tom Circenis, the TV3 Group's director of sports programming, confirmed that channels would insert commercial breaks during Russian and Belarusian athletes' performances, describing this as an editorial decision coordinated with the Latvian Olympic Committee. This policy constitutes a boycott in response to the participation of neutral athletes from "aggressor countries".

Following the opening ceremony on 6 February 2026 at San Siro in Milan, Ukraine's Ministry of Foreign Affairs criticized the IOC after it emerged that the placard bearing the name "Ukraine" had been carried by a Russian volunteer. Ukrainian Foreign Ministry spokesperson Heorhii Tykhyi wrote on X that the IOC leadership were "not just idiots, but real sadists", reacting to reports that the sign had been carried by Anastasiia Kucherova, a Russian national residing in Italy. Kucherova volunteered to hold the placard, acknowledging that Ukrainians had "every human right to feel hatred towards any Russian" but hoping to use the ceremony as a gesture of respect. She also considered the act a protest against the death of Alexei Navalny two years prior.

== Athletes' expression ==
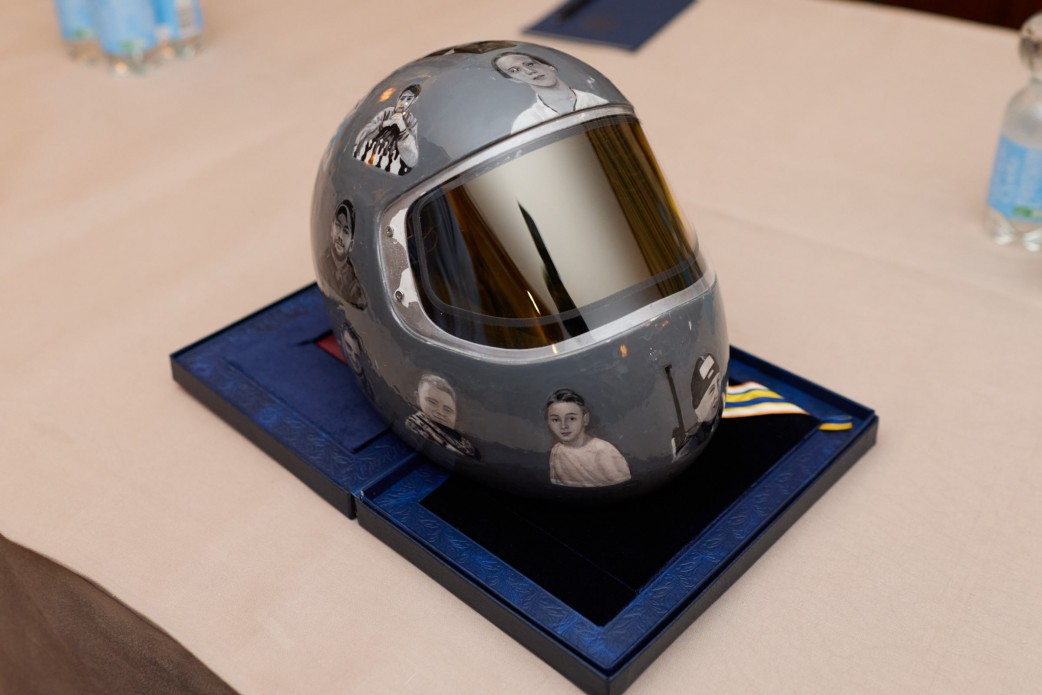
Vladyslav Heraskevych's helmet that resulted in his disqualification

British-American freestyle skier Gus Kenworthy shared an Instagram post hours before arriving at the Olympics, where the words "fuck ICE" could be seen written in urine in the snow, referring to U.S. Immigration and Customs Enforcement. Kenworthy was not censored or punished by the IOC for his post, because it was posted outside the Olympic environment on his personal social media. The Hill have reported that a "growing number" of American athletes have expressed discomfort with the political climate under the second administration of Donald Trump. This included figure skater Amber Glenn who criticized the administration for its policies towards the LGBTQ community and freestyle skier Hunter Hess, who stated he felt conflicted representing the United States. These remarks promoted backlash from Trump and his supporters. Hess's comments were defended by American snowboarder Chloe Kim, who emphasized that athletes are entitled to express their personal views. After the Ice hockey at the 2026 Winter Olympics – Men's tournament, some comments made by the winners enlisted controversy along with a surprise appearance of Kash Patel.

The Haitian Olympic team was forced to remove a depiction of Toussaint Louverture from their opening ceremony uniforms after the IOC determined that his presence on their clothing violated Olympic policies on political expression.

Ukrainian skeleton racer Vladyslav Heraskevych was banned from wearing a helmet depicting Ukrainian athletes killed during the Russo–Ukrainian War, with the IOC stating that the helmet violated the Olympic Charter's guideline on demonstrations and "political, religious or racial propaganda". As a compromise, he was instead allowed to wear a black armband. Heraskevych later changed his mind and proclaimed he would accept a disqualification rather than wear a black armband because a "medal is worthless in comparison to people's lives and, I believe, in comparison to the memory of these athletes." With no resolution by the day of the competition on 12 February, a jury of the International Bobsleigh and Skeleton Federation ruled to disqualify him from the Games. Ukrainian short track speed skater Oleh Handei was banned from using his helmet because it had a line of poetry from Lina Kostenko. Handei maintained the Kostenko quote, "Where there is heroism, there is no final defeat", had nothing to do with politics. Freestyle skier Kateryna Kotsar also had to remove the phrase "Be brave like Ukrainians" from her helmet.

== Allegations of crotch enhancement ==
Some athletes were reported injecting hyaluronic acid onto the crotch area to improve performance in ski jumping. Earlier, two Olympic gold medalists and three staffers on the Norway men's team "were charged with ethics violations after equipment manipulation following an investigation" stemming from an incident where they were reportedly "caught on video adding stitching into the crotch area of their suits to make them bigger and thus, more aerodynamic during competition."

== Allegations of violations by the Canadian curling teams ==
Both the men's and women's Canadian curling teams were accused of delivery violations, specifically touching the stone after it reached the hog line, and touching the granite surface of the stone rather than just the handle. The women's team had a stone removed during their round-robin loss to Switzerland for double-touching. The WCF decided to position umpires at the hog line to watch for potential violations. After a stone from a British curler was also removed from play for similar reasons the WCF held a meeting with representative teams where it was decided that umpires would only continue policing the hog line if there was a complaint during a game.

== Milan norovirus outbreak ==
The Finland v Canada women's ice hockey match, originally scheduled on 5 February 2026 at PalaItalia in Milan, was postponed to 12 February 2026, due to cases of norovirus in the Finnish team. In addition, one Swiss player was also isolated with the virus.

== Israeli bobsleigh team disqualification ==
Israel's first-ever bobsleigh team to compete at a Winter Olympics, was disqualified after the Israeli Olympic Committee withdrew the team. One athlete had claimed to be ill, a claim supported by a medical check and signed affidavit, to allow a substitute to complete in his place. It was later revealed that the athlete had falsely claimed to be sick. As substitutions are only permitted for legitimate illness or injury under Olympic rules, the Israeli Olympic Committee barred the team from competing further.

== Sponsor distribution dispute ==
Athletes were presented with sponsor-provided smartphones Samsung Galaxy Z Flip 7 Olympic Edition upon arrival at the Olympic Village; however, Russian competitors participating as AIN did not receive the devices. The IOC told Sovsport that, in order to comply with applicable legislation, the distribution of the phones to athletes from certain countries was prohibited, although it had ensured that all participants retained access to essential competition information and athlete services. Samsung, in turn, told TASS that it does not make decisions regarding the allocation of devices at the Games.

Meanwhile, Russian State Duma Deputy Dmitry Svishchev told TASS that he would personally provide smartphones, as well as additional tablets on behalf of the LDPR party, to the Russian athletes, describing the situation as unfair and accusing the IOC of failing to ensure equal treatment for all Olympic participants.

== IOC's designation of the women's ice hockey gold-medal game ==
Despite the highly anticipated nature of the gold-medal game between United States and Canada, the International Olympic Committee has not deemed the women's final to be a "high demand" game. Only the men's gold-medal game received the "high demand" determination. A game that is not labeled "high demand" will have the press box suites operate on a first come first serve basis.

== United States men's ice hockey team celebrations ==
After the United States men's ice hockey team won the men's ice hockey tournament, FBI director Kash Patel celebrated with the team in the locker room, which drew backlash from the Democratic Party politicians, as well as the American public. In addition, Donald Trump called the team and when inviting the team to that year's State of the Union, made controversial comments about the gold-medal winning US women's ice hockey team by joking that he would also need to invite the women's team to the White House or risk being impeached. The majority of the men's team accepted the invitation to attend the State of the Union address and visit the White House, while the women's team rejected the invite, with captain Hilary Knight calling the joke distasteful and lamented the overshadowing of the teams' connections, and highlighted a good learning point about how women in sports are discussed. Some men's players, such as Jeremy Swayman and Auston Matthews stated that Trump's comments were distasteful, while other players responded directly to questions about the situation. Women's players Megan Keller and Abbey Murphy similarly noted the close relationship between the men's and women's teams and said there was no underlying animosity, stressing that the dual gold medals were the defining story of the Games.
