= Simone Ferrari =

Simone Ferrari may refer to:

- Simone Ferrari (footballer) (born 1999), Italian football player
- Simone Ferrari (rugby union) (born 1994), Italian rugby union player
- Simone Ferrari (creative director), Italian creative director and director
