= Lochtegate =

Sports scandal

Lochtegate is the colloquial name of the scandal involving United States swim team members Ryan Lochte, Jimmy Feigen, Gunnar Bentz, and Jack Conger during the 2016 Summer Olympics held in Rio de Janeiro, Brazil. While initial news stories reported that Lochte and three other US swimmers had been robbed at gunpoint after a night out in Rio, later details emerged that the "armed robbers posing as police" were actually security guards at a gas station where the swimmers had urinated outside the bathroom and Lochte allegedly vandalized a framed poster, and ended with the swimmers providing money to the guards. Some of the swimmers were detained in Brazil as witnesses. Ultimately, the athletes each released statements, and one swimmer paid a fine of approximately $10,800 to a Brazilian charity in order to get his passport back. Lochte apologized for not being more candid about the gas station dispute, and subsequently lost four major sponsorships.

On September 8, both the U.S. Olympic Committee and USA Swimming suspended Lochte for 10 months and Bentz, Conger, and Feigen for four months. Additionally, Lochte was required to complete 20 hours of community service, and Bentz was required to complete 10 hours. All were made ineligible for financial support during their suspensions, removed from the U.S. Olympic delegation to the White House, barred from U.S. Olympic training centers, and blocked from attending USA Swimming's year-end Golden Goggles celebration.

Lochte was charged in Brazil with falsely reporting a crime. The scandal gained significant media attention both during the games and after their conclusion. In July 2017, the court in Brazil dismissed the charges against Lochte, saying his actions "did not rise to the level of filing a false crime report."

== Initial account of incident ==
On the morning of August 14, 2016, Ryan Lochte and Jimmy Feigen claimed that they and teammates Gunnar Bentz and Jack Conger were robbed in Rio de Janeiro, Brazil, during the 2016 Summer Olympics after armed men showing a "police badge" allegedly forced them out of their taxi at gunpoint in the early morning hours. The story was initially publicized that day after a chance encounter between Lochte's mother, Ileana Lochte, and Fox Sports Australia presenter Ben Way. Way tweeted that "Ryan Lochte has been held up at gunpoint," which resulted in a prompt denial from International Olympic Committee spokesman Mark Adams that the report was "absolutely not true." The next day, Lochte claimed in an interview with Billy Bush on the Today Show that the men who stopped their taxi had a police badge, and that one of the men cocked his gun and put it up against Lochte's forehead. Rio Olympics spokesman Mario Andrada stated, "We regret the violence has got so close to the athletes."

== Investigation and conflicting accounts of the incident ==
Lochte returned to the United States on August 15. On August 17, police went to the Olympic Village to secure Lochte and Feigen's passports "in order to secure further testimony from the athletes." On August 18, Lochte's attorney Jeff Ostrow said Lochte "sat for a victim interview with the Brazilian Tourist Police, USOC Security, State Department, FBI, and anyone else that the Brazilian authorities requested to be present."

On the evening of August 17, Conger and Bentz were removed from a flight while attempting to leave the country and their passports were seized in order to compel testimony about the incident. A judge in Brazil also issued a search and seizure warrant for Lochte and Feigen; Feigen subsequently contacted the authorities, and said he would make a public statement when the matter was settled. Civil Police of Rio de Janeiro concluded that the athletes were not robbed, but instead had been involved in an incident at a gas station in Barra da Tijuca, west of the city. According to statements by the owner on August 18, they broke a soap dispenser in the bathroom, damaged a door, tore down a sign and urinated around the premises. This investigation found that the swimmers stopped at a gas station near Casa França, where security guards detained the swimmers for vandalism perpetrated in a bathroom while intoxicated. Rio's police chief Fernando Veloso stated that the swimmers handed over 100 reals ($31) and $20 in U.S. currency as compensation for objects damaged in the bathroom, such as a soap holder, a mirror, and a "Please Do Not Enter" sign.

According to anonymous police sources, Conger and Bentz at first told the police Lochte's story was fabricated. The Associated Press reported that Conger and Bentz "refuted Lochte’s claim that the group was held up by armed assailants". Bentz stated that two guns were drawn, while Deluz, who helped translate conversations between the swimmers and armed security guards at the gas station, stated a gun was involved in the incident, but was not pointed at the swimmers. On the morning of August 18, upon his return to America, Feigen reiterated in an interview that "We were robbed at gunpoint." That same day, police recommended Lochte face charges for falsely reporting a crime. On August 19, Lochte hired public relations consultant Matthew Hiltzik and posted an apology on Instagram for his behavior.

=== Lochte charged in Brazil ===
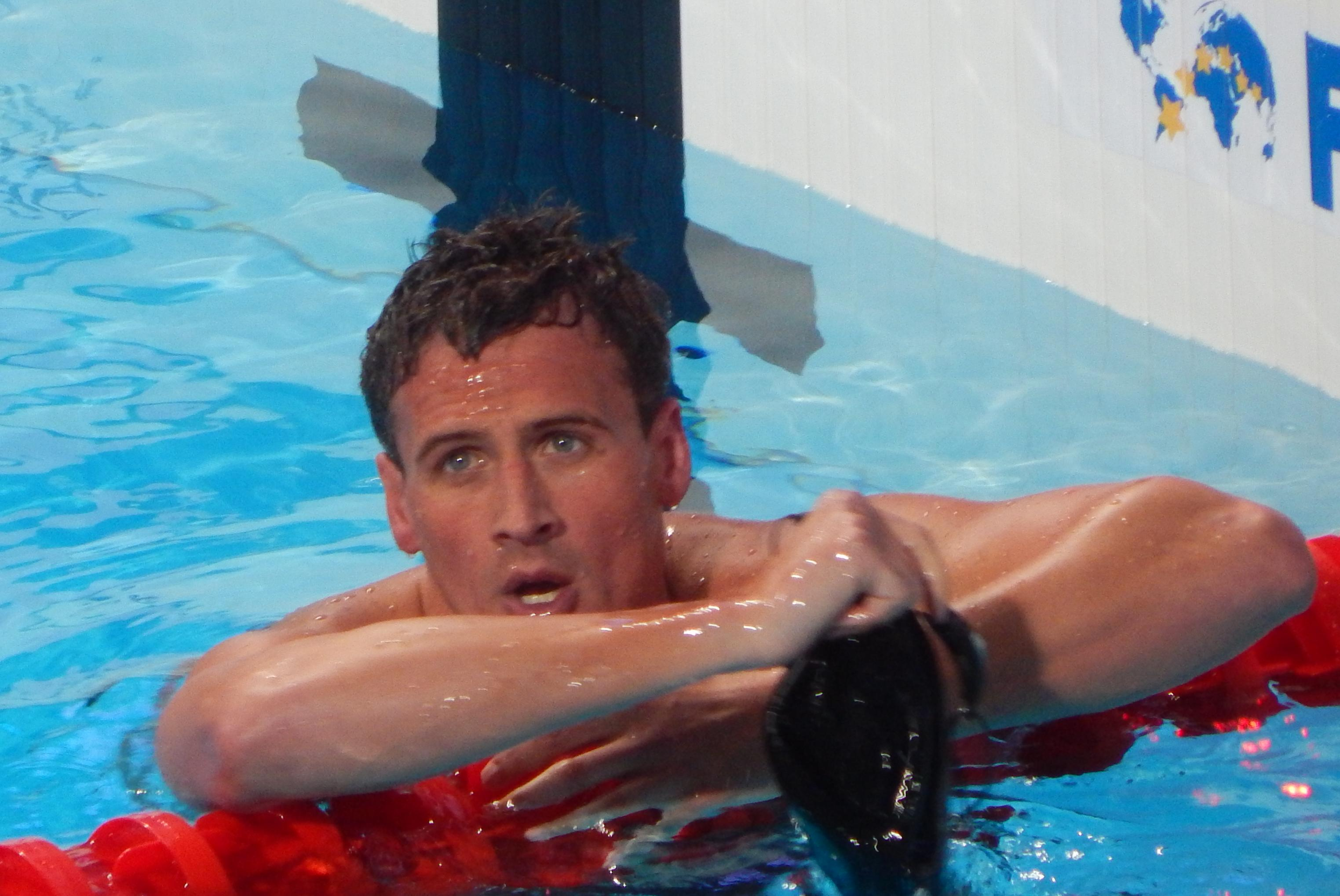
Lochte in 2015

On August 25, 2016, Lochte was charged by Rio police with falsely reporting a crime, with other officials stating he would be summoned to Rio. Lochte can be represented by a lawyer and is not required to appear in court. A conviction could result in one to six months in jail, with the judge allowed to levy a fine instead. Lochte would also have the ability to appeal any decision. The next day, Lochte's lawyer stated there would be no response to the charge of making a false statement which would create the possibility of Lochte being tried in absentia.

=== USA Today investigation ===
On August 23, USA Today released an on-site investigation at the gas station that "raised questions about Rio cops" and "supports Lochte's later account in which he said he thought the swimmers were being robbed." The USA Today report quoted a Brazilian judge who said police might have been hasty in determining the security guards did not commit a robbery, and a Brazilian lawyer "says she does not think the actions of Lochte and teammate Jimmy Feigen constitute the filing of a false police report as defined under Brazilian law". On August 30, Lochte appeared on ABC's TV morning show Good Morning America and doubled down on his insistence that the Rio police version of events is "absurd" and said:

"USA TODAY and other people have been finding out and investigating,...There was no damage to the bathroom. I have never even entered the bathroom. It was locked, so we couldn't go in there at all. The story about me vandalising the bathroom is absurd. It never happened."

On August 24, 2016, CBS News also questioned the accuracy of Brazil's version of events and cited the report by USA Today Sports, in line with their findings.

== Athlete statements ==
=== Lochte statement and fallout ===
Lochte made a television appearance on August 20, 2016, in which he continued to deny the premises of the situation, while apologizing for his "immature" decisions and behavior. PRWeek noted that many found the statement to be lacking, with Forbes noting possible legal exposure. Lochte later admitted he was drunk and that his claims were "over-exaggerated".

On August 26, when asked about whether the US would consider a request from Brazil to extradite Lochte, White House press secretary Josh Earnest replied "the United States will certainly adhere to the terms of any extradition treaty that we’ve signed with any country in the world. Obviously, as we’ve discussed in a very different context, we remain committed to following those guidelines assiduously, and allowing the guidelines of those treaties and the law here in the United States to guide those discussions and to guide those decisions. I can’t speak to the details of the charges that have been reportedly filed against Mr. Lochte, so for more details on that I think I’d refer you either to Brazilian authorities or to attorneys that have been retained by Mr. Lochte."

During an appearance on Good Morning America on August 30, 2016, Lochte said his claim of being held up at gunpoint was a "very big mistake," but regarding the ensuing scandal, "I think it's everyone blowing this way out of proportion. I think that's what happened." Regarding his claim that a gun was held to his head, he stated, "Like I said, I did lie about that one part." and that it was made while still intoxicated the next day.

On August 19, 2016, Lochte's attorney reiterated both the specific robbery allegation, saying "That part of the story will never change. We stand behind that," as well as the core the elements of uniformed guards, armed, and demanding money. On August 30, 2016, Lochte refuted the Rio de Janeiro police's claims of vandalism by the swimmers, stating, "USA TODAY and other people have been finding out and investigating,” and "There was no damage to the bathroom. I have never even entered the bathroom. It was locked, so we couldn't go in there at all."

=== Feigen statement and fine ===
Feigen issued a statement on August 24, 2016, after he was allowed to leave Brazil. The content of the statement began with "I would like to apologize for the serious distractions from the Olympics..." After giving his understanding of the facts of the case, he also said "In this statement, I omitted the facts that we urinated behind the building and that Ryan Lochte pulled a poster off the wall. This statement was written by the officers in Portuguese, and I was then asked to sign the statement without seeing it translated into English. I realize that I made a mistake by omitting these facts. I was trying to protect my teammates and for this I apologize."

USA Today reported that Feigen paid a fine and then left Brazil on August 19, 2016, after his passport was released. Feigen stated that he paid the fine of approximately $10,800 to a Brazilian charity in order to get his passport back. He also stated the court initially proposed a $31,250 fine and 15 days of community service. After he rejected the offer, the judge increased the amount to $46,875, but Feigen's attorney negotiated the final amount.

=== Bentz and Conger statements (no charges) ===
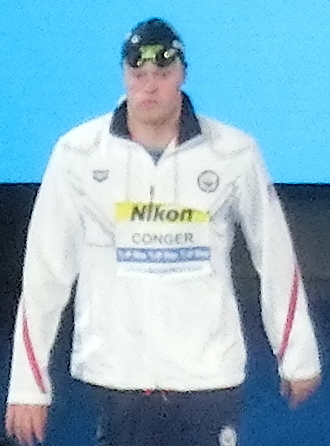
Jack Conger in 2017

On the evening of August 17, Conger and Bentz were removed from a flight while attempting to leave the country and their passports were seized in order to compel testimony about the incident. A judge in Brazil also issued a search and seizure warrant for Lochte and Feigen; Feigen subsequently contacted the authorities, and said he would make a public statement when the matter was settled. Civil Police of Rio de Janeiro concluded that the athletes were not robbed, but instead had been involved in an incident at a gas station in Barra da Tijuca.

After Bentz returned to the United States, he released a statement August 19 about the incident. He started by stating "I want to offer a sincere apology to the United States Olympic Committee, USA Swimming, the extraordinary women and men of Team USA, and the University of Georgia." He continued with "While I am anxious to put this matter behind me and rejoin my Georgia teammates in classes, practices and competitions, I feel compelled to stress several key points. 1. I was never a suspect in the case from the beginning (Brazilian law enforcement officials saw me only as a witness). 2. I never made a false statement to anyone at any time." He went on detailing the incident to include admitting to urinating behind the gas station, and that Lochte pulled down a framed metal advertisement.

After Conger returned to the United States, he issued a statement on August 19, 2016, in which he stated "Let me begin by emphasizing that I have been completely truthful in my statements throughout this unfortunate situation, including the information I provided to US officials before leaving Brazil. In fact, the Brazilian authorities made clear to me from the very beginning that I was being considered only a witness, not a suspect." He apologized by saying "we pulled into a gas station to use the restroom, but ultimately relieved ourselves outside, for which I apologize."

== Aftermath ==
=== Media response ===
The story, and the athletes' multiple versions of it, dominated Olympic headlines, and was described as "overshadowing the worthy accomplishments of athletes who trained for years." NBC drew criticism for its handling of Lochte's account. On August 24, 2016, Lochte's attorney stated about the prior week, "I’ve had every media outlet in the world reach out to me, the biggest news shows, the biggest talk shows."

The scandal drew social media mockery and then scorn, including commentary about white privilege and rude Americans. #Lochtegate became a trending topic on Twitter, alternatively dubbed as #LochMess, with the social media phenomenon drawing media coverage. with Time awarding the meme a silver medal.

Talk show hosts Stephen Colbert parodied Lochte's Today Show interview and compared his behavior to Donald Trump, while Jimmy Fallon parodied Lochte at the MTV Video Music Awards with attendee Michael Phelps' joy "noticeable from the start."

=== Aftermath in Brazil ===
In Brazil, the events "shocked and deeply angered Brazilians, who said it cast a false negative shadow on their city" and was condemned for drawing additional attention to crime and violence in Rio de Janeiro. Some Brazilians drew parallels between the swimmers' actions and U.S. foreign policy.

The Shell gas station was incorporated into a commercial tour of Olympic sites, and reports an increase in paid customers and visitors taking selfies.

=== Reactions by fellow athletes ===
Fellow American swimmer Lilly King said, "It’s sad that people aren’t focusing on how well the U.S. Olympic team did. This might have been the best team we've ever had." Swimmer Maya DiRado, who earned four medals said, "We wish that that hadn't taken attention away from our week of swimming because it was a phenomenal week for Team U.S.A. and U.S. swimming, and it was a phenomenal week on week two for those athletes on track and field." Conor Dwyer added, "It was tragic that the last week of the games that's all they're talking about and we don't want that to reflect poorly on U.S.A. swimming." Michael Phelps said, "It's always hard to see a friend and competitor go through a hard time like this. I know what it feels like and I've been through it before."

=== Marketability impact on involved swimmers ===
Marketers believed future professional and business opportunities for Gunnar Bentz, 20, and Jack Conger, 21, would be significantly reduced.

MediaMiser reported Lochte's favorability rating changed from 90% positive on August 14–15 to 70% negative on August 17–18, with Forbes projecting a reduction of "at least $5-10 million in future lifetime income" due to damage to his personal brand.

After Lochte's statements, Speedo and Ralph Lauren ended their endorsement deals with Lochte, with Speedo announcing that the company would donate $50,000 from Lochte's endorsement fee to Save the Children in Brazil. The Brazilian newspaper O Globo reported that other sponsors of Ryan Lochte, the Airweave and Syneron Candela also terminated their contracts. According to a commentator and sports business analyst for ESPN, Darren Rovell, Lochte will lose US$1 million. However, Lochte signed new endorsement deals with Pine Bros Softish Throat Drops with the campaign slogan "Forgiving On Your Throat" and Robocopp, a crime prevention company, which manufactures a "sound grenade" designed to deter would-be robbers. Pine Bros CEO Rider McDowell told Yahoo Finance there was a 20% sales increase in the week following the signing.

He also joined Dancing with the Stars. During the live installment of the season premier, two men wearing anti-Lochte T-shirts rushed the stage while Lochte was receiving his scores. They were tackled by security guards, then arrested by the Los Angeles Police Department and charged with suspicion of criminal trespassing.

Lochte stated his intent to participate in the Tokyo Olympics in 2020. On August 26, Lochte announced that he will be making a celebrity appearance at a Wizard World Comic Con in Richmond, VA in September 2016.

=== Discipline of the athletes ===
On August 18, U.S. Olympic Committee CEO Scott Blackmun apologized for the incident On August 19, the International Olympic Committee created a disciplinary commission for the four swimmers, to investigate the matter and potentially sanction the athletes. On August 21, Blackmun stated that further action would occur involving the four.

==== USOC & USA Swimming sanctions ====
On September 8, both the U.S. Olympic Committee and USA Swimming suspended Lochte for 10 months and Bentz, Conger and Feigen for four months. Additionally, Lochte was required to complete 20 hours of community service and Bentz required to complete 10 hours. All were made ineligible for financial support during their suspensions, removed from the U.S. Olympic delegation to the White House, barred from U.S. Olympic training centers, and blocked from attending USA Swimming's year-end Golden Goggles celebration.

Lochte's lawyer, Jeff Ostrow, declined to comment on the appropriateness of the sanctions, and reiterated that "Ryan did not commit a crime." Conger stated, "I do not agree in any way with these sanctions," and maintained that all he did wrong was to urinate publicly at the gas station.

Blackmun's statement noted, "As we have said previously, the behavior of these athletes was not acceptable. It unfairly maligned our hosts and diverted attention away from the historic achievements of Team USA," and "Each of the athletes has accepted responsibility for his actions and accepted the appropriate sanctions." Chuck Wielgus of USA Swimming stated, "Unfortunately, this storyline took attention away from the athletes who deserved it the most" and "These [swimmers] took accountability for their mistakes and are committed to represent themselves and our country with the great character and distinction we expect."

== Commentary ==
=== Gender equality ===
Several opinion writers criticised the contrasting consequences faced by Lochte to both women's goalkeeper Hope Solo, who was suspended by the United States Soccer Federation for six months after making unsportsmanlike post-game comments, and American gymnast Gabby Douglas. An Associated Press columnist stated, "A triumphant Olympics for the U.S. team — especially all those golden female athletes — has come with some nasty aftershocks, raising more potential questions about gender inequality." Salon criticized the general treatment of male athletes including past Olympians, while Variety noted the impact in which "NBC wants to both showcase women athletes and attract female viewers."

=== White privilege ===
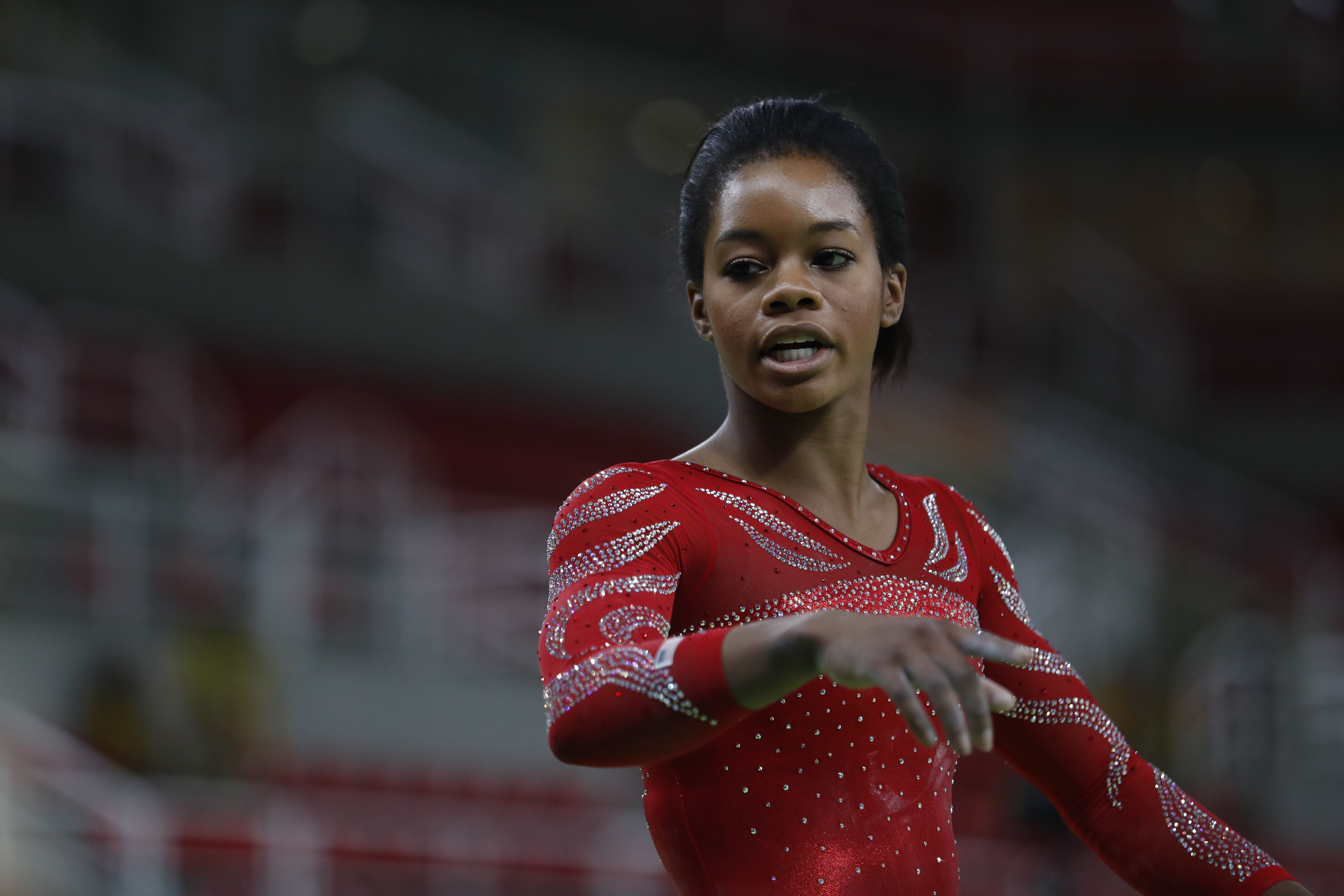
Gymnast Gabby Douglas in Rio

Several opinion pieces drew links to white privilege, while others refuted the charge. Ebony stated, "Lochte's tale of being robbed by seemingly corrupt cops was not only in line with what many already believed about nations full of people of color, but it also tainted the spirit of the entire games." Leah Donella, a news assistant at NPR, disagreed, "Lochte's own background — he's half Cuban, another country with an extremely complex racial history — further complicates that narrative." But in an opinion piece for Bustle, Cristina Arreola pushes back on that idea: "Ryan Lochte doesn't get a pass on white privilege because he's Latino, though. No question about it, blue-haired dude-bro has white privilege in spades. You probably didn't even know he's Cuban-American, since it's not apparent in his appearance or his name. Even if he is technically Latino, he appears to be white and so the world treats him as such."[102]

Some negatively contrasted the treatment of the scandal involving white swimmers against the reaction received by African-American gymnast Gabby Douglas for not placing her hand over her heart during the national anthem.

== See also ==
- Concerns and controversies at the 2016 Summer Olympics
- Olympic Games scandals and controversies
- List of scandals in Brazil
- List of scandals with "-gate" suffix
- List of sporting scandals
