= 2026 Winter Olympics opening ceremony =

- Part of 2026 Winter Olympics
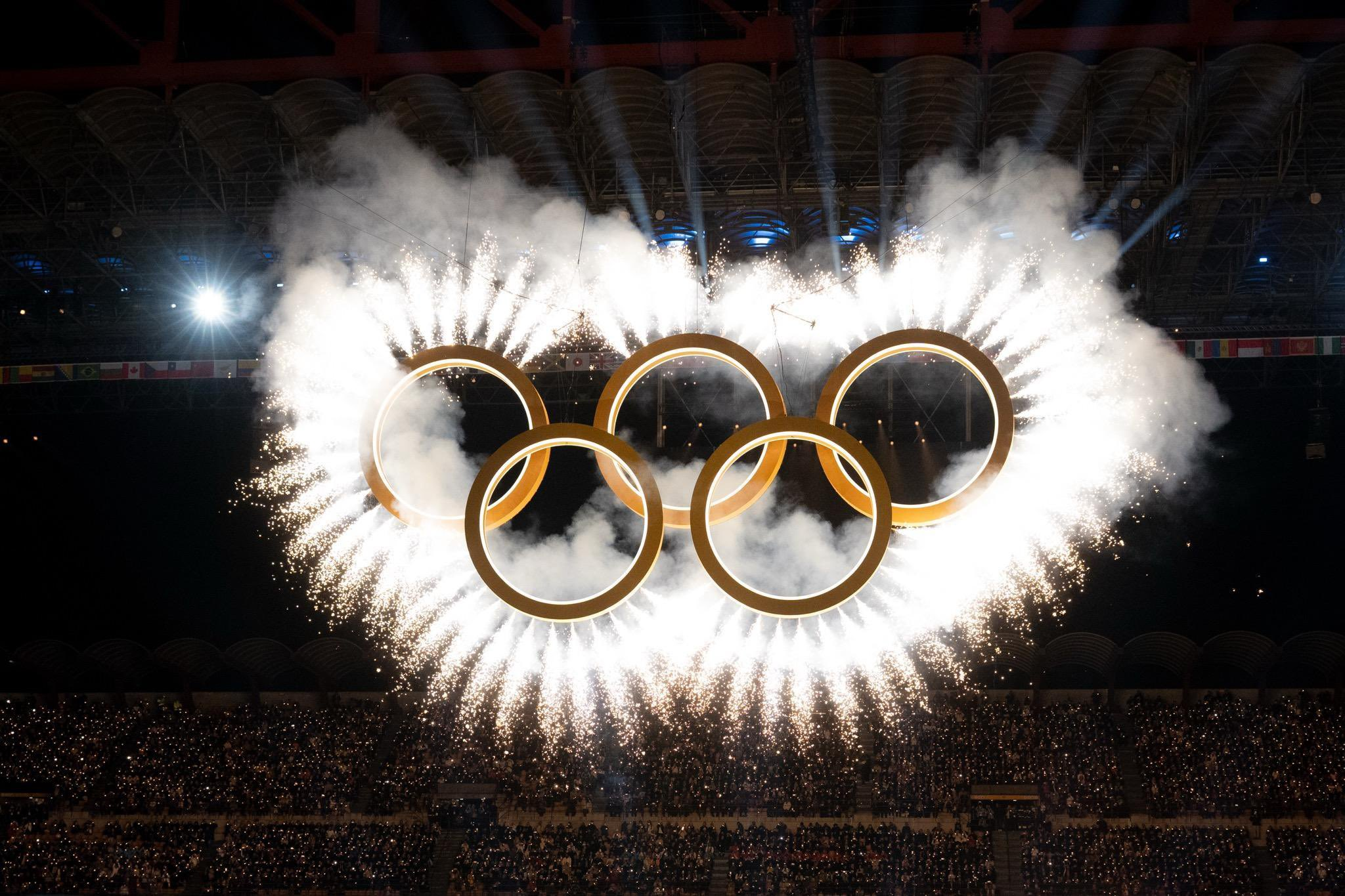
- Unveiling of the Olympic rings during the ceremony
- Date: 6 February 2026; 8 months ago
- Time: 20:00–23:35 CET (UTC+1)
- Venue: San Siro, Livigno, Predazzo and Cortina
- Location: Milan, Italy
- Also known as: Armonia (Harmony)
- Filmed by: Olympic Broadcasting Services (OBS)
- Footage: 2026 Winter Olympics Opening Ceremony in Olympic Channel on YouTube

The opening ceremony of the 2026 Winter Olympics took place on 6 February 2026. It started at 20:00 CET (19:00 UTC) and concluded at 23:29. It was held primarily at San Siro in Milan, but also included Livigno, Predazzo, and the streets of Cortina, Italy. This was the first opening ceremony of the Olympics which took place across four locations in the host country. As mandated by the Olympic Charter, the proceedings included an artistic program showcasing the culture of the host country and city, with harmony being a central theme, concluding with the parade of athletes and the lighting of the Olympic cauldrons.

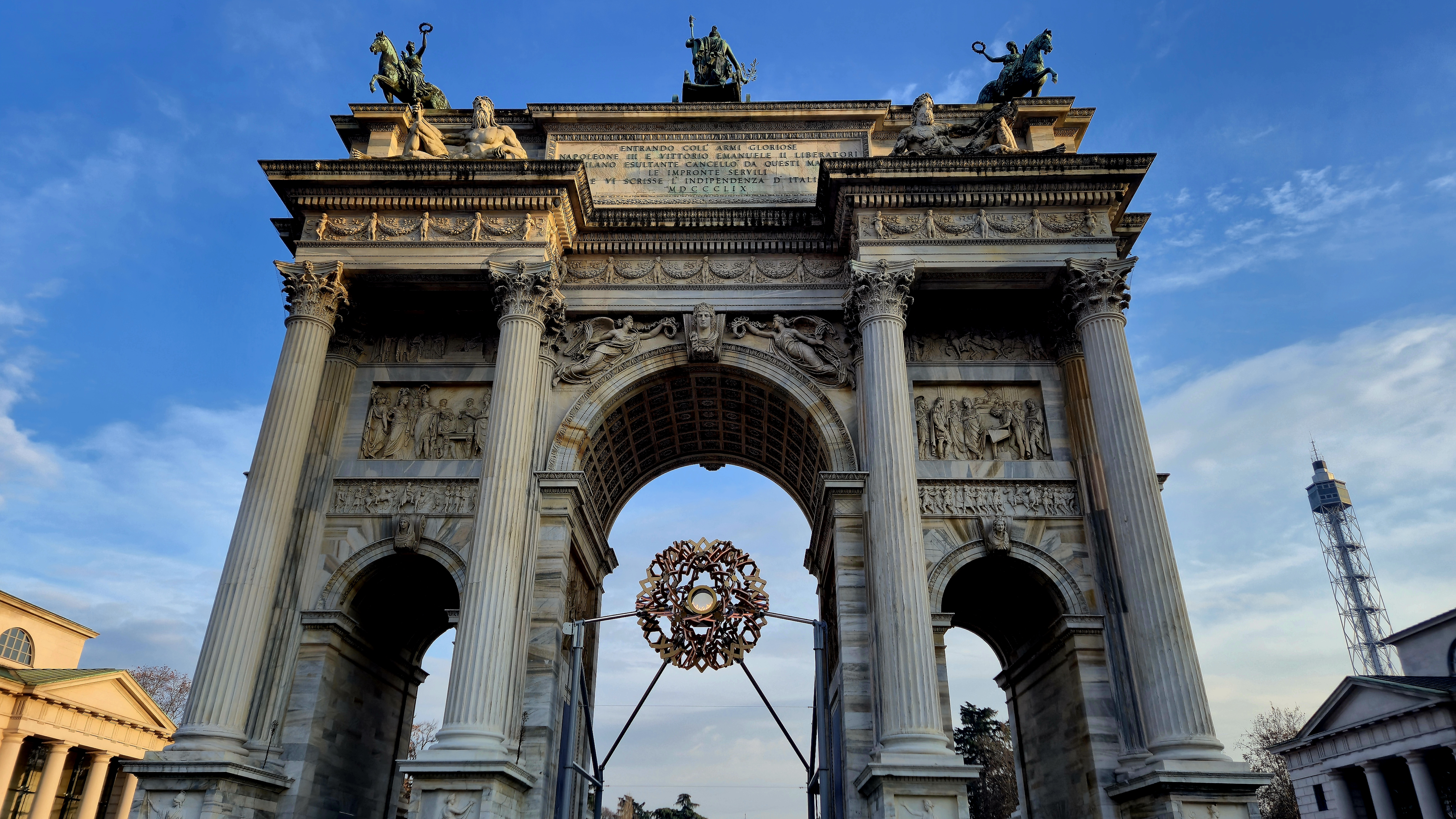
Olympic cauldron in Milan

The Games were formally opened by the president of Italy, Sergio Mattarella. This was the first Winter Olympics and first Olympic Games opening ceremony under the IOC presidency of Kirsty Coventry.

== Preparations ==
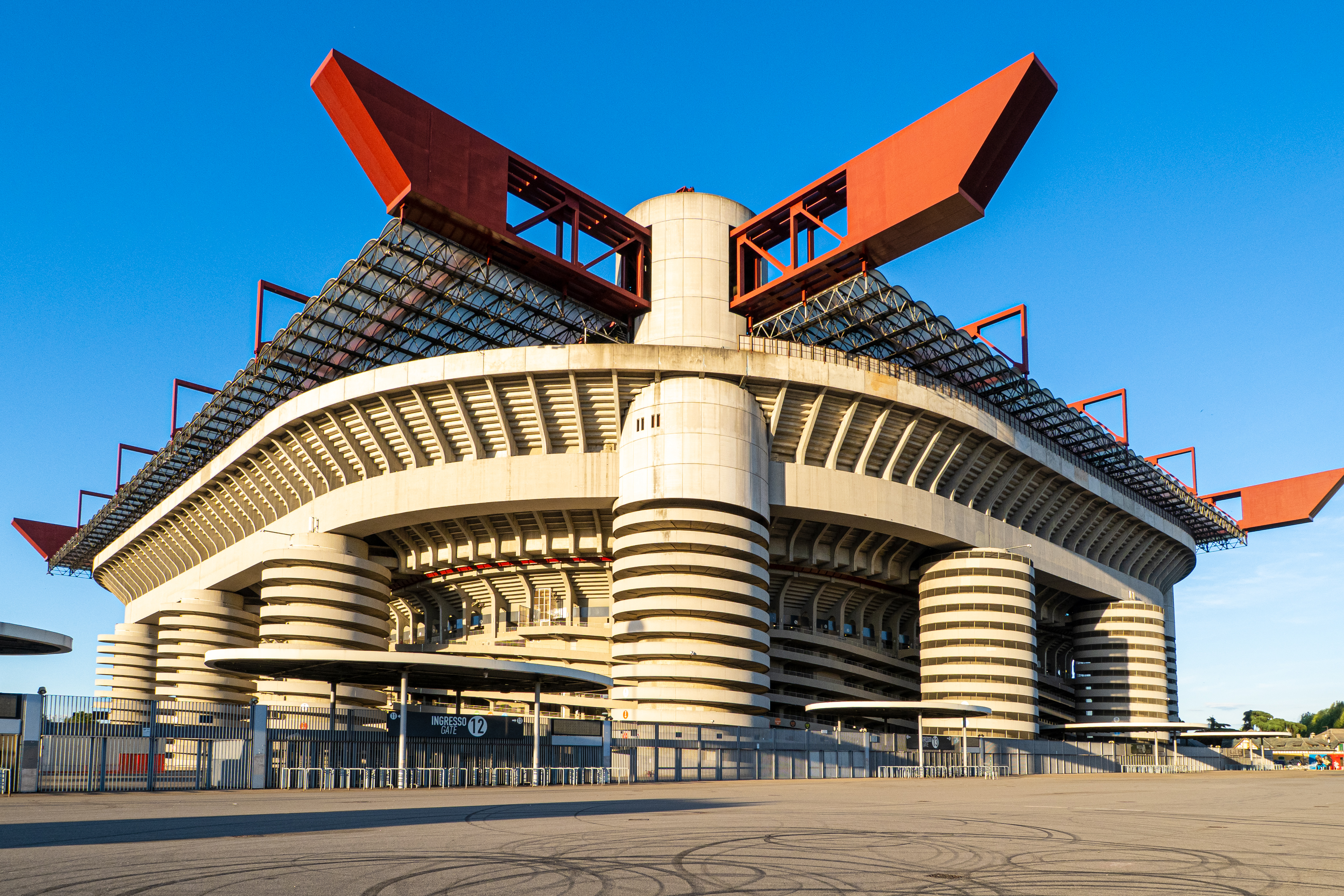
San Siro

The opening ceremony team was composed by Marco Balich as Creative Lead, Simone Ferrari as Creative Director & Deputy Creative Lead, Lulu Helbaek, Damiano Michieletto and Lida Castelli as Creative Directors and produced by Banijay Live's Balich Wonder Studio. The Production Designer was Paolo Fantin, Costume Designer Massimo Cantini Parrini. It is the first time that there are two cauldrons in two different cities. The ceremony primarily took place at the San Siro in Milan, while there were events, including the Parade of Nations at sites in Cortina, Livigno, and Predazzo, highlighting the Games' host sites. The ceremony featured about 1,200 volunteer performers and more than 1,400 costumes; the performers participated in nearly 700 hours of rehearsals. There were nearly 61,000 spectators at San Siro, with ticket prices reaching $2,300 USD (€2,026). It was filmed by Olympic Broadcasting Services (OBS) and broadcast by the International Olympic Committee's (IOC) global media rights holders.

The theme for the ceremony was "Armonia" (Harmony). Balich explained that the word harmony derives from Ancient Greek: "It means 'bringing together' in musical terms, different elements."

== Proceedings ==
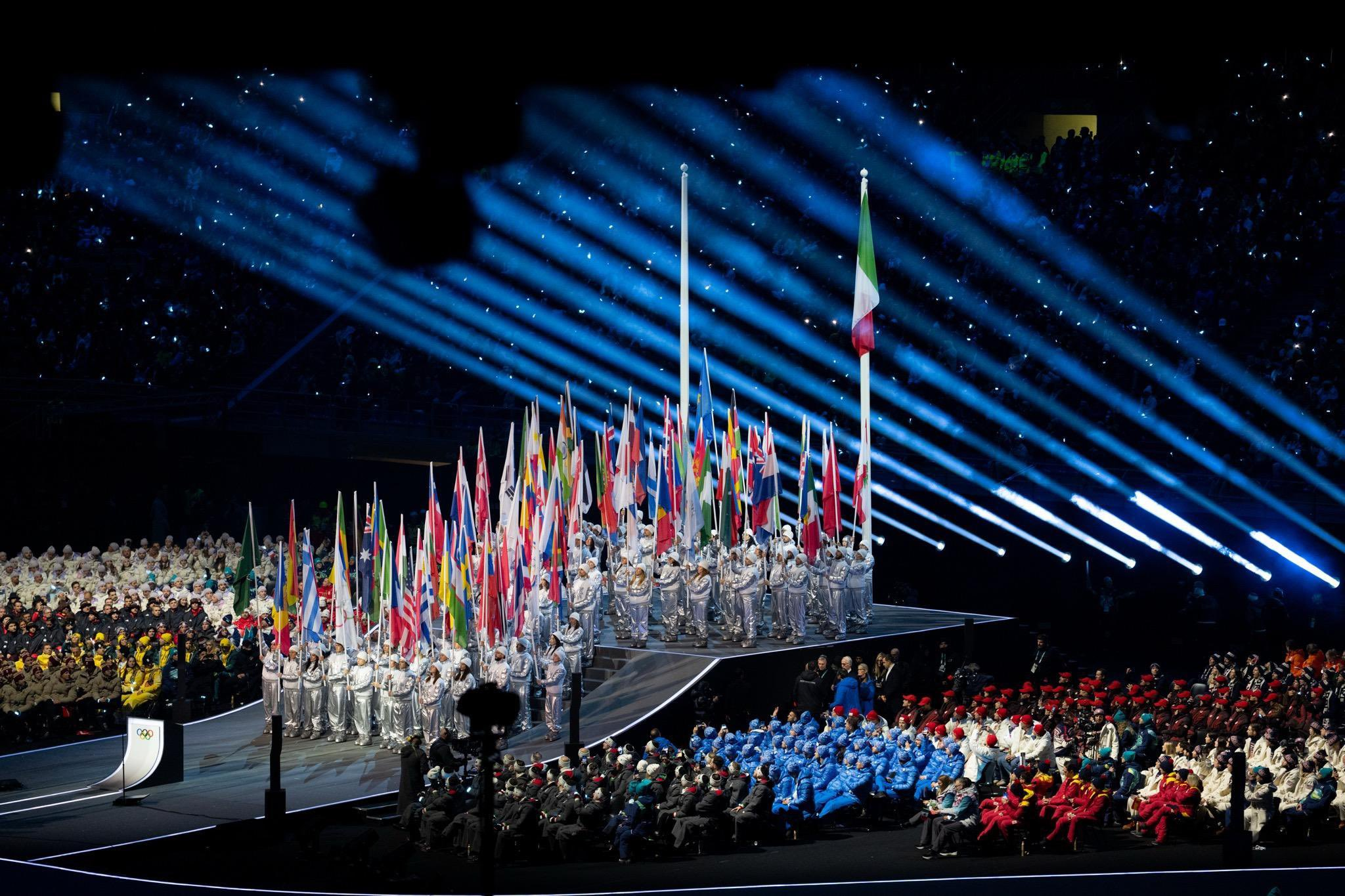
Flag bearers at the opening ceremony Parade of Nations

The ceremony began at 20:00 CET with a 30-second countdown. At the end of the countdown, the text "Armonia" appeared on the screen, and fireworks were set off inside the stadium. The show itself began with a tribute to Italian artist Antonio Canova, telling the story of Cupid and Psyche through a museum setting accompanied by dancers and music. After this, Italian actress Matilda De Angelis 'conducted' Italian composers Giacomo Puccini, Gioachino Rossini, and Giuseppe Verdi. Three hanging blue, red, and yellow paint tubes appeared over the stadium, releasing their colours while dancers performed, symbolising creativity and artistic expression. Their respective costumes showcased Italy's cultural heritage, cuisine, and history, most notably the character of Pinocchio and the Italian Moka pot. A brief tribute to the late Italian pop culture icon Raffaella Carrà also occurred. Afterwards, A performance by American singer Mariah Carey followed, with her performing "Nel blu, dipinto di blu" in Italian and her single "Nothing Is Impossible".

At San Siro, a pre-filmed video segment introduced Italian President Sergio Mattarella depicting him riding a tram in Milan driven by Valentino Rossi, before his entrance in the stadium together with IOC President Kirsty Coventry and the Games' organising committee president Giovanni Malago. Following this, models wore costumes in the colors of the Italian flag designed by the late Giorgio Armani. Vittoria Ceretti passed the country's flag off to the Carabinieri; in Cortina, Fulvio Valbusa, Giorgio Di Centa, Pietro Piller Cottrer, and Cristian Zorzi did the same to an all-women Carabinieri. Italian singer Laura Pausini performed "Il Canto degli Italiani", while a mountain choir did the same simultaneously in Cortina d'Ampezzo.

The Olympic rings were unveiled during a segment featuring dancers showcasing the 'harmony' between the city (Milan) and the mountains (Cortina), symbolising the two host cities of the Games. In addition, Italian actor Pierfrancesco Favino delivered a recitation of Giacomo Leopardi's poem "L'infinito". The score was led by Giovanni Andrea Zanon playing the 1716 Berthier Stradivarius violin. After this, the parade of nations commenced, beginning with Greece and ending with the host nation, Italy. Athletes from 93 countries paraded from four venues in Milan, Cortina d'Ampezzo, Livigno, and Predazzo, against the backdrop of dance music provided by producer DJ Mace; the Italian athletes marched as a remixed version of "Largo al factotum" from Rossini's opera The Barber of Seville was heard.

Following the parade, Italian actress Sabrina Impacciatore and dancers celebrated the 100 years of the Winter Olympic Games, first showcasing all the past Winter Olympics in backwards chronological order in a premade animated video - also featuring the Games' mascots Tina and Milo - and then live in the stadium. This entire segment featured in the premade video before the animated sequence. Music played during the segment included "Prisencolinensinainciusol" by Adriano Celentano. Prior to the official speeches by Coventry and Malagò, actress Brenda Lodigiani performed a segment on Italian hand gestures. President Mattarella then proceeded to declare the Games open. Afterward, Italian tenor singer Andrea Bocelli performed "Nessun dorma".

A segment promoting peace featured South African and American actress and United Nations Messenger of Peace Charlize Theron and Italian rapper Ghali, the latter reciting the anti-war poem "Promemoria" by Gianni Rodari while dancers recreated the "dove of peace".

The Olympic flag was raised in both Milan and Cortina d'Ampezzo, carried by Rebecca Andrade, Eliud Kipchoge, Cindy Ngamba, Pita Taufatofua, Tadatoshi Akiba, Maryam Bukar Hassan, Nicolò Govoni, Filippo Grandi, Franco Nones and Martina Valcepina; the Olympic Hymn was performed by Italian singer Cecilia Bartoli, American cellist Yo-Yo Ma, Chinese pianist Lang Lang, and the Teatro alla Scala children's choir members. The Olympic oath was stated at Cortina's Piazza Angelo Dibona by athletes (curler Stefania Constantini and luger Dominik Fischnaller of Italy), coaches, and judges.

Before the lighting of the cauldrons, a tribute to the European Union featuring the anthem was shown. It was then followed by a short segment about Europe's involvement with space exploration and astronomy (with the European Space Agency), showing Italian astronaut Samantha Cristoforetti and a young girl witnessing a space-themed performance. The Olympic flame, which previously briefly entered the stadium, then proceeded to its final destination. The cauldron, inspired by Leonardo da Vinci's 'knot' geometric designs, was lit by Italian alpine skiers Deborah Compagnoni and Alberto Tomba located in Milan's Arco della Pace monument, while another was lit by Italian alpine skier Sofia Goggia at Cortina's Piazza Angelo Dibona.

== Anthems ==
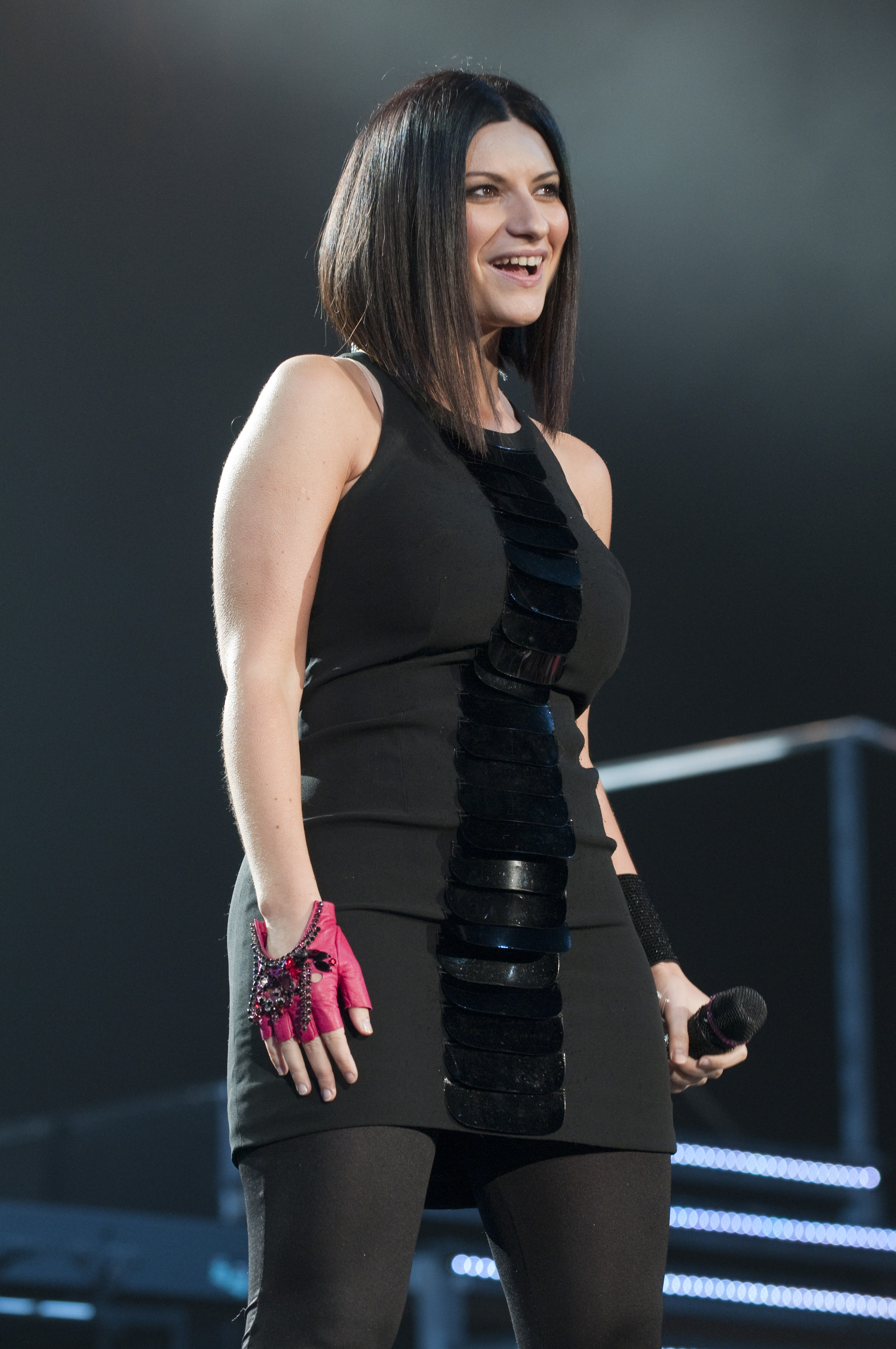
Laura Pausini sang "Il Canto degli Italiani", the Italian national anthem

- National Anthem of Italy – Laura Pausini
- Olympic Anthem – Cecilia Bartoli (sung in English), Lang Lang, Yo-Yo Ma.

== Dignitaries in attendance ==
=== International Olympic Committee ===
Members of the International Olympic Committee and the Olympic movement, not counting foreign representatives:

- IOC –
  - Kirsty Coventry, President of the International Olympic Committee
  - Thomas Bach, Honorary President of the International Olympic Committee
- IPC –
  - Andrew Parsons, President of the International Paralympic Committee

=== Host ===
- Italy –
  - Sergio Mattarella, President of the Italian Republic
  - Giorgia Meloni, Prime Minister of Italy
  - Giovanni Malagò, President of the Milano Cortina Organising Committee for the 2026 Olympic and Paralympic Winter Games
  - Giuseppe Sala, Mayor of Milan
  - Gianluca Lorenzi, Mayor of Cortina d'Ampezzo

=== International ===
International organizations

- European Union – Roberta Metsola, President of the European Parliament
- UN – ⁣António Guterres, Secretary-General of the United Nations
  - Annalena Baerbock, President of the United Nations General Assembly
- FIFA - Gianni Infantino, FIFA President

Countries

- Albania – Bajram Begaj, President of Albania
- Austria – Christian Stocker, Chancellor of Austria
- Belgium – Elisabeth, Crown Princess of the Kingdom of Belgium (representing her father, King Philippe)
- Bosnia and Herzegovina – Zeljka Cvijanovic, President of Bosnia and Herzegovina
- Bulgaria – Iliana Iotova, President of Bulgaria
- Canada – Adam van Koeverden, Secretary of State (Sport) (representing Governor General Mary Simon)
- Chile – José Antonio Kast, President-elect of Chile (representing President Gabriel Boric)
- China – Shen Yiqin, State Councillor of China (representing Chinese leader Xi Jinping)
- Croatia – Kolinda Grabar-Kitarovic, former President of Croatia
- Czech Republic – Petr Pavel, President of the Czech Republic
- Denmark – Frederik X and Mary, King and Queen of the Kingdom of Denmark
- Estonia – Alar Karis and Sirje Karis, President of Estonia
- Finland – Alexander Stubb, President of Finland
- France – Marina Ferrari, Sports Minister of France
  - Laurence Auzière-Jourdan, First Stepdaughter of France (representing President Emmanuel Macron, host country of the 2030 Winter Olympics)
- Georgia – Mikhail Kavelashvili, President of Georgia
- Germany – Frank-Walter Steinmeier, President of Germany
- Greece – Kyriakos Mitsotakis, Prime Minister of Greece
- Hungary – Tamás Sulyok, President of Hungary
- Jordan – Prince Faisal bin Hussein of Jordan (representing his brother, King Abdullah)
- Latvia – Edgars Rinkevics, President of Latvia
  - Evika Silina, Prime Minister of Latvia
- Lithuania – Gitanas Nauseda, President of Lithuania
- Luxembourg – Guillaume, Grand Duke of Luxembourg
- Monaco – Albert II, Sovereign Prince of Monaco
- Netherlands – Willem-Alexander, King of the Netherlands
  - Maxima, Queen consort of the Netherlands
  - Catharina-Amalia, Princess of Orange
- Poland – Karol Nawrocki, President of Poland
- Qatar – Tamim bin Hamad Al Thani, Emir of the State of Qatar
- Serbia – Đuro Macut, Prime Minister of Serbia
- Slovakia – Peter Pellegrini, President of Slovakia
- Slovenia – Nataša Pirc Musar, President of Slovenia
- South Korea – Chae Hwi-young, Culture and Sports Minister of South Korea (representing President Lee Jae Myung)
- Spain – Felipe VI and Letizia, King and Queen of the Kingdom of Spain
- Sweden – Victoria, Crown Princess of the Kingdom of Sweden (representing her father, King Carl Gustaf)
- Switzerland – Guy Parmelin, President of Switzerland
- Thailand – Suthida, Queen of Thailand (representing her husband King Vajiralongkorn)
- United Kingdom – Anne, Princess Royal (representing her brother, King Charles III)
- United States – JD Vance, Vice President of the United States (representing President Donald Trump)
  - Marco Rubio, United States Secretary of State
  - Eleni Kounalakis, Lieutenant Governor of California (representing Governor Gavin Newsom of California, host state of the 2028 Summer Olympics)
  - Karen Bass, Mayor of Los Angeles (Host city of the 2028 Summer Olympics)
  - Tilman Fertitta, United States Ambassador to Italy
  - Usha Vance, Second Lady of the United States

== Television coverage ==
The opening ceremony was filmed by host broadcaster Olympic Broadcasting Services (OBS), with OBS distributing a "world feed" for rights-holding broadcasters to use.

=== Commentators and hosts ===
- Italy
  - Rai 1: Paolo Petrecca, Fabio Genovesi and Stefania Belmondo
- Australia
  - Nine Network: Allison Langdon, Todd Woodbridge and Lydia Lassila
- Bosnia and Herzegovina
  - BHT1: Medina Šehić and Velid Spaho
- Brazil
  - CazéTV: Luís Felipe Freitas and Casimiro Miguel
  - Globo:
    - TV Globo: Gustavo Vilani, Marcel Stürmer, Carlos Gil and Gilberto Nogueira
    - SporTV and Ge TV: Luiz Carlos Júnior, Isabel Clark Ribeiro, Jaqueline Mourão, Marcelo Barreto and Marcelo Lins
- Bulgaria
  - BNT 1 and BNT 3: Tsvetelina Abrasheva, and Evgeni Nikolov
- Canada
  - CBC Sports: Adrienne Arsenault and Devin Heroux
  - Ici Radio-Canada Télé: Guillaume Dumas and Serge Denoncourt
- Croatia
  - HRT 1: Viki Ivanović and Daniel Križ
- Czech Republic
  - ČT Sport: Michal Dusík and Miroslav Langer
- Finland
  - Yle TV2: Nina Vanhatalo, Johannes Oikarinen and Tuomas Heikkilä (Finnish), Marianne Nyman and Janne Isaksson (Swedish)
- Germany
  - Das Erste (ARD): Tom Bartels and Giovanni di Lorenzo.
- Hungary
  - M4 Sport (MTVA/Duna Média): Attila Tóth and Tamás Vásárhelyi
- Ireland
  - RTÉ: Pauric Lodge and Tamsen Hanlon
- Netherlands
  - NPO 1 (NOS): Erik van Dijk and Mark Tuitert.
- Poland
  - TVP1: Marek Rudziński, Piotr Sobczyński
- Portugal
  - RTP2: Paulo Sérgio, Luís Lopes
- Sweden
  - SVT2: AnnaMaria Fredholm and Anja Pärson
- United Kingdom
  - BBC Two: John Hunt and Hazel Irvine
- United States
  - NBC Sports (NBCUniversal): Mary Carillo, (Note: Filling in for Savannah Guthrie who was unable to attend in order to assist in the investigation of the disappearance of her mother Nancy.) Terry Gannon and Shaun White

=== Viewership ===
According to Auditel ratings, the opening ceremony was seen in Italy by an average of 9.2 million viewers. In the United States, the ceremony was seen by 21.4 million viewers, a 34% increase from the 2022 Winter Olympics.

== Analysis ==
Critically, The Guardian's Alexis Petridis gave the ceremony received mixed-to-positive reviews, while Variety's Alison Herman described it as a "playful celebration of Italian culture." In addition, Dominic Patten of Deadline Hollywood stated that the ceremony was "a beautiful but baffling Italian buffet."

== Controversy ==
During the Parade of Nations, U.S. Vice President JD Vance and the Israeli team were booed by some of the audience present at San Siro. American broadcaster NBC appeared to have cut the booing of Vance from footage. While the negative reception was heard on OBS broadcasts, NBC's telecast received accusations of censorship.

The commentary of the opening ceremony aired by Italian broadcaster RAI was heavily criticized. Numerous gaffes were made by director Paolo Petrecca; in addition to speaking over images and the other two commentators, Fabio Genovesi and Stefania Belmondo, Petrecca confused actress Matilda De Angelis with singer Mariah Carey, mistook IOC president Kirsty Coventry for President Sergio Mattarella's daughter, made offensive comments during the athletes' parade, and failed to recognize the Olympic champions of the women's national volleyball team (with the exception of Paola Egonu). Rai Sport journalists announced that, in protest against Petrecca's commentary, they would withdraw their signatures from their reports, links, and commentary from 5:00 p.m. on Monday, February 9th, until the end of the Olympic Games; they will then go on strike for three days. The editorial board, the internal journalists' representation, has requested that the union statement be read during the Olympic news broadcasts and on the programs "Mattina Olimpica" and "Notti Olimpiche." The CEO of RAI asked him to take responsibility for both the commentary of the Olympic opening ceremony and for the tense relations with the editorial staff. On 19 February, Petrecca handed back his mandate to Rai CEO Giampaolo Rossi, announcing that he would be leaving his post at the end of the Olympic Games.

When declaring the Games open, Italian President Sergio Mattarella incorrectly stated "the 15th Olympic Winter Games" instead of the 25th.
