= List of Olympic Games scandals, controversies and incidents =

The Olympic Games is a major international multi-sport event. During its history, both the Summer and Winter Games have been the subject of scandals, controversies and incidents.

Cheating, such as the use of performance enhancing drugs by athletes, has regularly affected the Olympic Games. Some countries have boycotted the Games on various occasions, either as a protest against the International Olympic Committee or the contemporary politics of other participants. Some countries have also been banned from the Olympics, such as the defeated countries after both World Wars or South Africa under apartheid. Other controversies have included decisions by referees and gestures by athletes.

== Summer Olympics ==
=== 1896 Summer Olympics – Athens, Greece ===
- Marathon runner Spyridon Belokas won the bronze medal, but later admitted to covering part of the course by carriage, and was disqualified.

=== 1900 Summer Olympics – Paris, France ===
- The Games were considered a planning and organizational failure. In athletics, organizers did not allow enough room for throwing events, leading Hungarian discus throw gold medalist Rudolf Bauer to throw three of his attempts into the crowd. Swimming events were held in the River Seine, which was a sewage outflow for Paris.

=== 1904 Summer Olympics – St. Louis, Missouri, United States ===
- Marathon runner Frederick Lorz reached the finish line first and was about to be awarded the gold medal before it was revealed he had not run the entire race. Lorz, suffering cramps, had dropped out of the race after nine miles and hitched a ride back to the stadium in a car. When the car broke down at the 19th mile, he re-entered the race and jogged across the finish line. Upon being confronted by race officials, Lorz admitted his deception and was disqualified.
- Anthropology Days, an unofficial part of the Games, involved indigenous peoples from around the world being displayed and performing in sporting events that they had not been prepared for.

=== 1906 Intercalated Games – Athens, Greece ===
- Peter O'Connor, an Irish athlete representing Great Britain, climbed up the Olympic flagpole with an Irish flag in order to protest being considered a British competitor.

=== 1908 Summer Olympics – London, England, United Kingdom ===
- Grand Duchy of Finland competed separately from the Russian Empire, but was not allowed to display the Finnish flag.
- In the men's 400 metres, American winner John Carpenter was disqualified for blocking British athlete Wyndham Halswelle in a manoeuvre that was legal under American rules but prohibited by the British rules under which the race was run. As a result of the disqualification, a second final race was ordered. Halswelle was to face the other two finalists William Robbins and John Taylor, but both were from the United States and decided not to contest the repeat of the final to protest the judges' decision. Halswelle was thus the only medallist in the 400 metres, a race which became the only walkover victory in Olympic history. Taylor later ran on the gold medal-winning U.S. team for the now-defunct Medley Relay, becoming the first African American medallist.

=== 1912 Summer Olympics – Stockholm, Sweden ===
- American athlete Jim Thorpe was stripped of his gold medals in the decathlon and pentathlon after it was learned that he had played professional minor league baseball three years earlier. In solidarity, the decathlon silver medalist, Hugo Wieslander, refused to accept the medals when they were offered to him. The gold medals were restored to Thorpe's children in 1983, 30 years after his death.
- Portuguese marathon runner Francisco Lázaro became the first Olympic athlete to die in competition after collapsing on the track. Heat exhaustion, sunstroke, heart problems, and a possible electrolyte imbalance are thought to have contributed.

=== 1916 Summer Olympics (not held due to World War I) ===
- The 1916 Summer Olympics were to have been held in Berlin, German Empire, but were cancelled because of the outbreak of World War I.

=== 1920 Summer Olympics – Antwerp, Belgium ===
- Budapest had initially been selected over Amsterdam and Lyon to host the Games, but as the Austro-Hungarian Empire had been a German ally in World War I, the French-dominated International Olympic Committee transferred the Games to Antwerp in April 1919.
- Austria, Bulgaria, Germany, Hungary, and Turkey were not invited to the Games, being the successor states of the Central Powers which were defeated in World War I.
- The final of the football tournament was won by Belgium after the Czechoslovakia team walked off the pitch while the score was 0–2 to protest a referee's decision.

=== 1924 Summer Olympics – Paris, France ===
- Germany was again not invited to the Games.
- In the boxing middleweight quarter final, British boxer Harry Mallin showed the referee a bite mark on his chest inflicted by French opponent Roger Brousse. The referee nonetheless declared Brousse the victor. A Swedish official protested on Mallin's behalf, and Brousse's previous opponent, Argentine Manolo Gallardo, complained that he had also been bitten. Brousse was disqualified, and Mallin went on to win the gold medal.

=== 1928 Summer Olympics – Amsterdam, Netherlands ===
- The women's 800 meters race caused controversy after several women reportedly collapsed at the finish line. As a result, races longer than 200 meters were banned for women until the 1960 Olympics.

=== 1932 Summer Olympics – Los Angeles, California, United States ===
- Nine-time Finnish Olympic gold medallist Paavo Nurmi was found to be a professional athlete and banned from running in the Games. The main orchestrators of the ban were the Swedish officials that were the core of the IOC bureaucracy, including IOC president Sigfrid Edström, who claimed that Nurmi had received too much money for his travel expenses. Nurmi did, however, travel to Los Angeles and kept training at the Olympic Village. Despite pleas from all the other entrants of the marathon, he was not allowed to compete at the Games. This incident, in part, led to Finland refusing to participate in the traditional Finland-Sweden athletics international annual event until 1939.
- After winning the silver in equestrian dressage, Swedish rider Bertil Sandström was demoted to last for clicking to his horse to encourage it. He asserted that it was a creaking saddle making the sounds.

=== 1936 Summer Olympics – Berlin, Germany ===
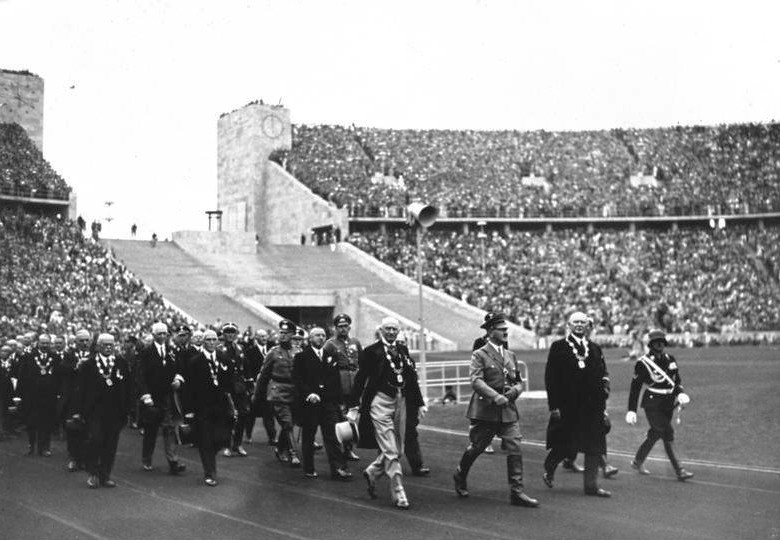
Adolf Hitler arriving at the opening ceremony of the controversial 1936 Berlin Games

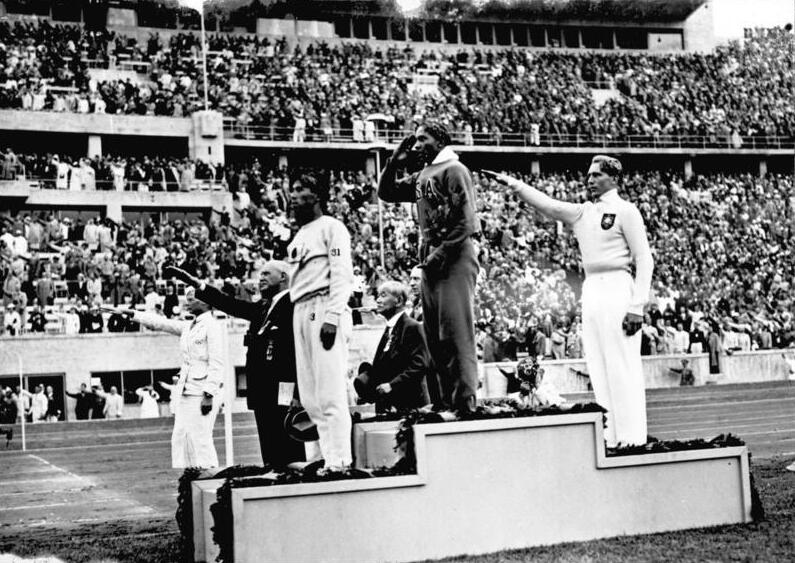
Jesse Owens on the podium after winning the long jump at the 1936 Summer Olympics

- In 1931, the International Olympic Committee (IOC) selected the German capital city Berlin as the host city of the 1936 Summer Olympics. However, following Adolf Hitler's rise to power in 1933, the plans for the Olympic Games became entangled with the politics of the Nazi regime. Hitler regarded the event as 'his' Olympics and sought to exploit the Games for propaganda purposes, with the aim of showcasing post-First World War Germany. In 1936, a number of prominent politicians and organizations called for a boycott of the Summer Olympics, while other campaigners called for the games to be relocated.
- Lithuania was not invited by Germany due to the Memelland/Klaipėda region controversy.
- Under the proposal of the autonomous Government of Catalonia, the newly elected Popular Front government of the Second Spanish Republic decided to boycott the Berlin Games entirely and, together with labour and socialist groups around the world, organized an alternative event, the People's Olympiad, held in Barcelona, Catalonia. The event did not take place however; just as the Games were about to begin the Spanish Civil War broke out and the People's Olympiad was canceled.
- In the United States, there was considerable debate about boycotting the Games. A leading advocate of a boycott was U.S. athlete and politician Ernest Lee Jahncke, the son of a German immigrant, who was an IOC member before being expelled from the IOC for his views.
- International concern surrounded the ruling German Nazi Party's ideology of racial superiority and its application at an international event such as the Olympics. In 1934 Avery Brundage undertook a visit to Germany to investigate the treatment of Jews. When he returned, he reported, "I was given positive assurance in writing ... that there will be no discrimination against Jews. You can't ask more than that and I think the guarantee will be fulfilled." However, a number of record-holding German athletes were excluded from competing at Berlin for being racially undesirable, including Lilli Henoch, Gretel Bergmann and Wolfgang Fürstner. The only Jewish athlete to compete on the German team was fencer Helene Mayer.
- Jewish American athletes Sam Stoller and Marty Glickman were originally selected to compete in the 4×100 meter relay, but were replaced on the day of the race by Jesse Owens and Ralph Metcalfe, despite Owens' protests. Glickman has claimed the decision was made to keep Jewish athletes off the podium "so to not embarrass Adolf Hitler".
- Hitler's decision not to shake hands with American long-jump medal winner Jesse Owens has been widely interpreted as a snub of an African American; however some commentators have noted that Hitler missed all medal presentations after the first day as he only wished to shake hands with German victors. Owens himself was reported to have been magnanimous when he mentioned Hitler. After the Games however, Owens was not personally honoured by President Franklin D. Roosevelt.
- The Irish Olympic Council boycotted the games as the IAAF had expelled the National Athletic and Cycling Association for refusing to restrict itself to the Irish Free State rather than the island of Ireland.
- In the cycling match sprint final, German Toni Merkens fouled Dutch Arie van Vliet. Instead of disqualification, Merkens was fined 100 German reichsmarks and kept the gold medal.
- In one of the football quarter-finals, Peru beat Austria 4–2 but Austria nonetheless advanced to the next round under very controversial circumstances. As a sign of protest the complete Olympic delegations of Peru and Colombia left Germany.

=== 1940 and 1944 Summer Olympics (not held due to World War II) ===
- The 1940 Summer Olympics were scheduled to be held in Tokyo, Japan, but were cancelled due to the outbreak of the Second Sino-Japanese War. The government of Japan abandoned its support for the 1940 Games in July 1938. The IOC then awarded the Games to Helsinki, Finland, the runner-up in the original bidding process, but the Games were not held due to the Winter War. Ultimately, the Olympic Games were suspended indefinitely following the outbreak of World War II and did not resume until the London Games of 1948.

=== 1948 Summer Olympics – London, England, United Kingdom ===
- The two major Axis powers of World War II, Germany and Japan, were suspended from the Olympics, although Italy, their former ally, participated. German and Japanese athletes were allowed to compete again at the 1952 Olympics.

=== 1952 Summer Olympics – Helsinki, Finland ===
- The Republic of China (Taiwan) withdrew their athletes due to the participation of the People's Republic of China.

=== 1956 Summer Olympics – Melbourne, Australia and Stockholm, Sweden ===
- Eight countries boycotted the Games for three different reasons. Cambodia, Egypt, Iraq, and Lebanon announced that they would not participate in response to the Suez Crisis during which Egypt had been invaded by Israel, the United Kingdom, and France after Egypt had nationalized the Suez Canal. The Netherlands, Spain, and Switzerland withdrew to protest the Soviet Union's invasion of Hungary during the 1956 Hungarian Revolution and the Soviet presence at the Games. Less than two weeks before the Opening Ceremony, the People's Republic of China also chose to boycott the event, protesting the Republic of China (Taiwan) being allowed to compete (under the name "Formosa").
- The political frustrations between the Soviet Union and Hungary boiled over at the games themselves when the two men's water polo teams met for the semi-final. The players became increasingly violent towards one another as the game progressed, while many spectators were prevented from rioting only by the sudden appearance of the police. The match became known as the Blood in the Water match.
- The advent of the state-sponsored "full-time amateur athlete" of the Eastern Bloc countries further eroded the ideology of the pure amateur, as it put the self-financed amateurs of the Western countries at a disadvantage. The Soviet Union entered teams of athletes who were all nominally students, soldiers, or working in a profession, but many of whom were in reality paid by the state to train on a full-time basis. Nevertheless, the IOC held to the traditional rules regarding amateurism for athletes from non-Communist countries.
- Due to quarantine issues, the equestrian events were held in Stockholm, Sweden.

=== 1960 Summer Olympics – Rome, Italy ===
- In the modern pentathlon, the team from Tunisia cheated by attempting to pass off their strongest fencer as each of their three athletes, using his mask to conceal his identity. The ruse was discovered and the Tunisians were disqualified from the fencing portion.
- The team from Taiwan was made to compete under the name "Formosa", and marched in the opening ceremony with a sign reading "Under Protest".
- In the men's 100 meter freestyle event, American Lance Larson and Australian John Devitt both appeared to touch the wall first, with half of the six judges each thinking Larson and Devitt had won. Head judge Hans Runströmer controversially gave the gold medal to Devitt.
- Danish cyclist Knud Enemark Jensen collapsed and died during the men's team time trial event after fracturing his skull. The death was blamed by some on performance enhancing drugs, and acted as an impetus for future drug testing at the Olympics.

=== 1964 Summer Olympics – Tokyo, Japan ===
- Indonesia and North Korea withdrew after the IOC decision to ban teams that took part in the 1963 Games of the New Emerging Forces and a three-year violent conflict, the Indonesia–Malaysia confrontation.
- South Africa was suspended from the Olympics due to its apartheid policies. The suspension would be lifted in 1992.
- Australian swimmer Dawn Fraser was arrested for allegedly stealing a flag from the Tokyo Imperial Palace, and was banned by the Australian national federation for ten years.

=== 1968 Summer Olympics – Mexico City, Mexico ===
- 1968 Olympics Black Power salute: Tommie Smith and John Carlos, two black athletes who finished the men's 200-metre race first and third respectively, performed the "Power to the People" salute during the United States national anthem. Peter Norman, a white Australian who finished in second place, wore a human rights badge in solidarity, and was heavily criticised upon returning to Australia.
- Věra Čáslavská, in protest to the 1968 Soviet-led invasion of Czechoslovakia and the controversial decision by the judges on the Balance Beam and Floor, turned her head down and away from the Soviet flag whilst the anthem played during the medal ceremony. She returned home as a heroine of the Czechoslovak people, but was made an outcast by the Soviet dominated government.
- Students in Mexico City tried to make use of the media attention for their country to protest the authoritarian Mexican government. The government reacted with violence, culminating in the Tlatelolco Massacre ten days before the Games began and more than two thousand protesters were shot at by government forces.
- The first Olympic disqualification for a banned substance occurred in the modern pentathlon competition, after Swedish athlete Hans-Gunnar Liljenwall drank two beers before the shooting portion, disqualifying the Swedish team from their third-place finish.

=== 1972 Summer Olympics – Munich, West Germany ===
- The Munich massacre occurred, when members of the Israeli Olympic team were taken hostage by the Palestinian terrorist group Black September. Eleven athletes, coaches and judges were murdered by the terrorists.
- Rhodesia was banned from participating in the Olympics as the result of a 36 to 31 vote by the IOC held four days before the opening ceremonies. African countries had threatened to boycott the Munich games had the white-minority-ruled regime been permitted to send a team. The ban occurred over the objections of IOC president Avery Brundage who, in his speech following the Munich massacre, controversially compared the anti-Rhodesia campaign to the terrorist attack on the Olympic village.
- In the controversial gold medal basketball game, the US team appeared to win the gold medal game against the Soviet team, but the final three seconds were replayed three times until the Soviets won.
- The 1972 Olympics Black Power salute, also known as the Forgotten Salute.
- At the end of the men's Marathon, a German impostor entered the stadium to the cheers of the stadium ahead of the actual winner, Frank Shorter of the United States. During the American Broadcasting Company coverage of the event, the guest commentator, writer Erich Segal, famously called to Shorter "It's a fraud, Frank."
- In the men's field hockey final, Michael Krause's goal in the 60th minute gave the host West German team a 1–0 victory over the defending champion Pakistan. Pakistan's players complained about some of the umpiring and disagreed that Krause's goal was good. After the game, Pakistani fans ran onto the field in rage; some players and fans dumped water on Belgium's Rene Frank, the head of the sport's international governing body. During the medals ceremony, the players staged protests, some of them turning their backs to the West German flag and handling their silver medals disrespectfully. According to the story in the Washington Post, the team's manager, G.R. Chaudhry, said that his team thought the outcome had been "pre-planned" by the officials, Horacio Servetto of Argentina and Richard Jewell of Australia.

=== 1976 Summer Olympics – Montreal, Canada ===
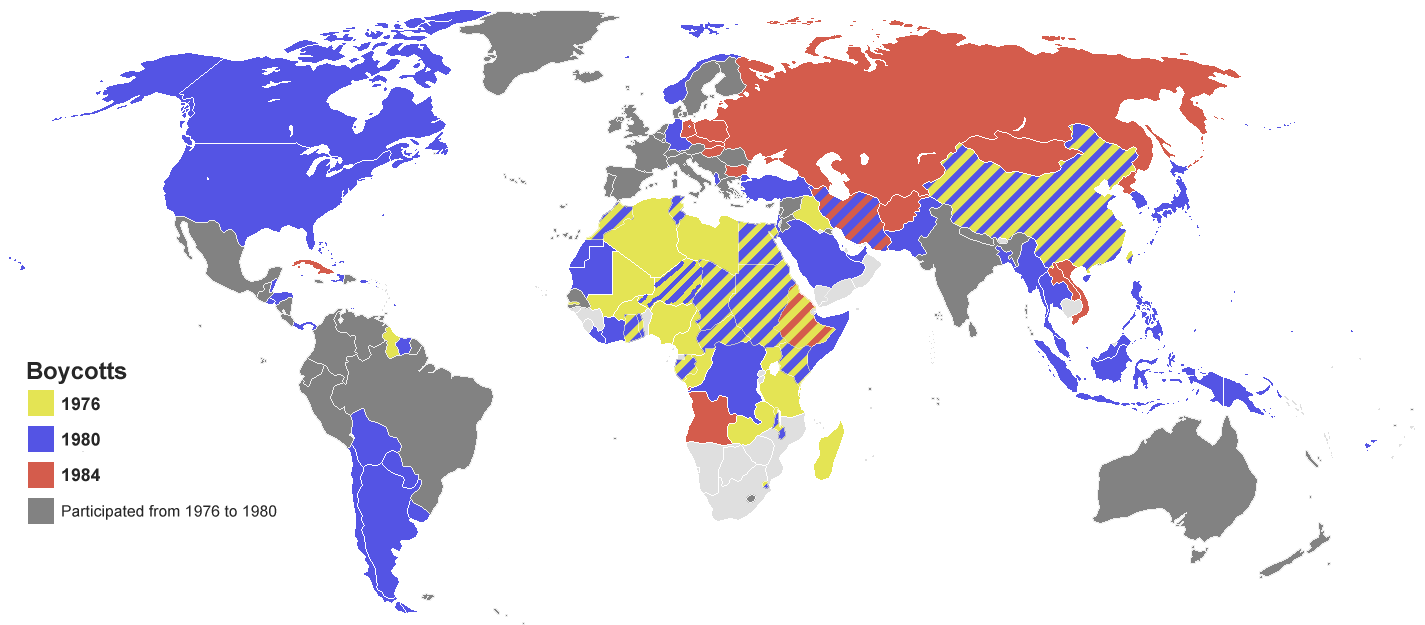
Countries boycotting the 1976 (yellow), 1980 (blue) and 1984 (red) Summer Olympics

- In protest against the New Zealand national rugby union team's 1976 tour of South Africa, controversial due to the regime's apartheid policies, Afghanistan, Albania, Burma, El Salvador, Guyana, Iraq, Sri Lanka, Syria and Tanzania, led a boycott of twenty-two African nations after the IOC refused to ban New Zealand from participating. Some of the teams withdrew after the first day. The controversy prevented a much anticipated meeting between Tanzanian Filbert Bayi—the former world record holder in both the 1500 metres and the mile run—and New Zealand's John Walker—who had surpassed both records to become the world record holder in both events. Walker went on to win the gold medal in the 1500 metres.
- Canada initially refused to allow the Republic of China's team (Taiwan) into the country as Canada did not recognize Taiwan as a nation. Canada's decision was in violation of its agreement with the IOC to allow all recognized teams. Canada agreed to allow the Taiwanese athletes into the country if they did not compete under the name or flag of the Republic of China. This led to protests and a threatened boycott by other countries including the US, but these came to naught after the IOC acquiesced to the Canadian demand which, in turn, led Taiwan to boycott the Games. The People's Republic of China also continued its boycott over the failure of the IOC to recognize its team as the sole representative of China.
- The various boycotts resulted in only 92 countries participating, down from 121 in 1972 and the lowest number since the 1960 Rome Games in which 80 states competed.
- Soviet modern pentathlete Boris Onishchenko was found to have used an épée which had a pushbutton on the pommel in the fencing portion of the pentathlon event. This button, when activated, would cause the electronic scoring system to register a hit whether or not the épée had actually connected with the target area of his opponent. As a result of this discovery, he and the Soviet pentathlon team were disqualified.
- Quebec, the host province, incurred $1.5 billion in debt, which was not paid off until December 2006. The Mayor of Montreal Jean Drapeau had famously said: "The Olympics can no more lose money than a man can have a baby."

=== 1980 Summer Olympics – Moscow, Soviet Union ===
- 1980 Summer Olympics boycott: U.S. President Jimmy Carter instigated a boycott of the games to protest the Soviet invasion of Afghanistan, as the Games were held in Moscow, the capital of the Soviet Union. Many nations refused to participate in the Games. The exact number of boycotting nations is difficult to determine, as a total of 66 eligible countries did not participate, but some of those countries withdrew due to financial hardships, only claiming to join the boycott to avoid embarrassment. Iran also boycotted the Moscow Games owing to Ruhollah Khomeini's support for the Islamic Conference's condemnation of the invasion of Afghanistan. Only 80 countries participated in the Moscow games, fewer than the 92 that had joined the 1976 Montreal games and the lowest number since the 1960 Rome games which had also featured 80 countries. A substitute event, titled the Liberty Bell Classic, often referred to as Olympic Boycott Games, was held at the University of Pennsylvania in Philadelphia by 29 of the boycotting countries.
- A 1989 report by a committee of the Australian Senate claimed that "there is hardly a medal winner at the Moscow Games, certainly not a gold medal winner ... who is not on one sort of drug or another: usually several kinds. The Moscow Games might well have been called the Chemists' Games." A member of the IOC Medical Commission, Manfred Donike, privately ran additional tests with a new technique for identifying abnormal levels of testosterone by measuring its ratio to epitestosterone in urine. Twenty percent of the specimens he tested, including those from sixteen gold medalists would have resulted in disciplinary proceedings had the tests been official. The results of Donike's unofficial tests later convinced the IOC to add his new technique to their testing protocols. The first documented case of "blood doping" occurred at the 1980 Summer Olympics as a runner was transfused with two units of blood (i.e. two pints or about 950 ml) before winning medals in the 5,000 m and 10,000 m.
- Polish gold medallist pole vaulter Władysław Kozakiewicz showed an obscene bras d'honneur gesture in all four directions to the jeering Soviet public, causing an international scandal and almost losing his medal as a result. There were numerous incidents and accusations of Soviet officials using their authority to negate marks by opponents to the point that IAAF officials found the need to look over the officials' shoulders to try to keep the events fair. There were also accusations of opening stadium gates to advantage Soviet athletes, and causing other disturbances to opposing athletes.
- Australian triple jumper Ian Campbell was controversially fouled for scraping his foot against the ground, during a jump which would have won him the gold medal over Soviet Jaak Uudmäe. In 2015, the Australian Olympic Committee demanded an investigation into the results.

=== 1984 Summer Olympics – Los Angeles, California, United States ===
- 1984 Summer Olympics boycott: The Soviet Union and fourteen of its allies boycotted the 1984 Games held in Los Angeles, United States, citing a lack of security for their athletes as the official reason. The decision was regarded as a response to the United States-led boycott issued against the Moscow Olympics four years earlier. The Eastern Bloc organized its own event, the Friendship Games, instead. The fact that Romania, a Warsaw Pact country, opted to compete despite Soviet demands led to a warm reception of the Romanian team by the United States. When the Romanian athletes entered during the opening ceremonies, they received a standing ovation from the spectators. For different reasons, Iran and Libya also boycotted the Games.
- The men's light heavyweight boxing match between Kevin Barry and Evander Holyfield ended in controversy, when referee Grigorije Novičić of Yugoslavia disqualified a clearly dominant Holyfield. Barry eventually won the silver medal, with Holyfield settling for bronze.
- In the women's 4 × 400-meter relay, injured Puerto Rican runner Madeline de Jesus enlisted her identical twin sister, Margaret, as an imposter for a qualifying heat. Margaret ran the second leg of the qualifier, and the team advanced but when the chief coach of the Puerto Rican team learned of the ruse, he pulled his team out of the final.
- In the women's 3000 meters, American Mary Decker and South African Zola Budd (representing Great Britain) infamously collided, leaving Decker injured and unable to continue. Budd was initially disqualified from her 7th-place finish but was later reinstated.
- One third of the United States cycling team was found to have received blood doping.

=== 1988 Summer Olympics – Seoul, Republic of Korea ===
- The games were boycotted by North Korea and its allies, Cuba, Ethiopia, Madagascar, and Nicaragua. Albania and the Seychelles did not provide reasons for their absence.
- Canadian sprinter Ben Johnson was stripped of his gold medal for the 100 metres when he tested positive for stanozolol after the event.
- In a highly controversial 3–2 judge's decision, South Korean boxer Park Si-Hun defeated American Roy Jones Jr., despite Jones pummelling Park for three rounds, landing 86 punches to Park's 32. Allegedly, Park himself apologized to Jones afterward. One judge shortly thereafter admitted the decision was a mistake, and all three judges voting against Jones were eventually suspended. The official IOC investigation concluding in 1997 found that three of the judges had been wined and dined by South Korean officials. This led to calls for Jones to be awarded a gold medal, but the IOC still officially stands by the decision, despite the allegations.
- American diver Greg Louganis suffered a concussion after he struck his head on the springboard during the preliminary rounds. He completed the preliminaries despite his injury, earning the highest single score of the qualifying round for his next dive and repeated the dive during the finals, earning the gold medal by a margin of 25 points. Louganis had been diagnosed HIV-positive six months prior to the games—a diagnosis that was not publicly disclosed until 1995. This led some to question Louganis' decision not to disclose his HIV status during the Games, although blood in a pool posed no risk.

=== 1992 Summer Olympics – Barcelona, Catalonia, Spain ===
- Three British athletes, sprinter Jason Livingston, weightlifters Andrew Davies and Andrew Saxton, were sent home after being tested positive for anabolic steroids and Clenbuterol.
- Russian weightlifter Ibragim Samadov was disqualified for a protest after he refused to accept the bronze medal at the medal ceremony. He was eventually banned for life.
- In the final of the men's 10,000 m Moroccan Khalid Skah was racing Kenyan Richard Chelimo for the gold medal; with three laps remaining they both lapped Moroccan Hammou Boutayeb. Although he was lapped he stayed with the leaders, slowing down the Kenyan and inciting the crowd to jeer. Initially Skah was disqualified for receiving assistance from a lapped runner, but, after an appeal by the Moroccan team to the IAAF, he was reinstated and his gold medal stood.
- Yugoslavia had to compete under the Independent Olympic Participants label and were banned from team events due to the country's conduct in the Yugoslav Wars and United Nations sanctions.

=== 1996 Summer Olympics – Atlanta, Georgia, United States ===
- The 1996 Olympics were marred by the Centennial Olympic Park bombing.
- A gold medal boxing match in which Daniel Petrov from Bulgaria won against Mansueto Velasco from the Philippines was described as robbery in the Philippines. One media outlet claimed that it appeared that the judges were pressing the buttons on their electronic scoring equipment for the wrong boxer. However, neutral commentators stated that "[i]n Atlanta [Petrov] proved his supremacy beyond doubt and was never really troubled in any of his 4 fights" and that "Velasco’s attempt to be the Philippines' first Olympic champion faltered from the beginning and [Petrov] was a clear winner by 19 points to 6". The New York Times reported that "Daniel Petrov Bojilov ... dominated Mansueto Velasco of the Philippines, 19-6", but acknowledged that "the Filipino deserved more points".

=== 2000 Summer Olympics – Sydney, Australia ===
- In December 2007, American track star Marion Jones was stripped of five medals after admitting to anabolic steroid use. Jones had won three gold medals (100-metre sprint, 200-metre sprint and 4×400 relay) and two bronze medals (long jump and 4×100 relay). The IOC action also officially disqualified Jones from her fifth-place finish in the Long Jump at the 2004 Summer Olympics. At the time of her admission and subsequent guilty plea, Jones was one of the most famous athletes to be linked to the BALCO scandal. The case against BALCO covered more than 20 top level athletes, including Jones's ex-husband, shot putter C.J. Hunter, and 100 m sprinter Tim Montgomery, the father of Jones' first child.
- Lance Armstrong: see History of Lance Armstrong doping allegations see Lance Armstrong doping case On January 17, 2013, the International Olympic Committee removed Armstrong's results in the 2000 Summer Olympics from its record books, and requested the return of his bronze medal from the time trial.
- In the Women's artistic gymnastics, Australian competitor Allana Slater complained that the vault was set too low. The vault was measured and found to be 5 centimetres lower than it should have been. A number of the gymnasts made unusual errors, including American Elise Ray, who missed the vault completely in her warm-up, and Briton Annika Reeder, who fell and had to be carried off the mat after being injured.
- Romanian Andreea Răducan became the first gymnast to be stripped of a medal after testing positive for pseudoephedrine, at the time a prohibited substance. Răducan, 16, took Nurofen, a common over-the-counter medicine, to help treat a fever. The Romanian team doctor who gave her the medication was expelled from the Games and suspended for four years. The gold medal was finally awarded to Răducan's teammate Simona Amânar. Răducan was allowed to keep her other medals, a gold from the team competition and a silver from the vault.
- Chinese gymnast Dong Fangxiao was stripped of a bronze medal in April 2010. Investigations by the sport's governing body (FIG) found that she was only 14 at the 2000 Games. (To be eligible the gymnastic athletes must turn 16 during the Olympic year). FIG recommended the IOC take the medal back as her scores aided China in winning the team bronze. The US women's team, who had come fourth in the event, moved up to third.

=== 2004 Summer Olympics – Athens, Greece ===
- In artistic gymnastics, judging errors and miscalculation of points in two of the three events led to a revision of the gymnastics Code of Points. The South Korean team contested Tae-Young's parallel bars score after judges misidentified one of the elements of his routine. Further problems occurred in the men's horizontal bar competition. After performing a routine with six release skills in the high bar event final (including four in a row—three variations of Tkatchev releases and a Gienger), the judges posted a score of 9.725, placing Nemov in third position with several athletes still to compete. The crowd became unruly on seeing the results and interrupted the competition for almost fifteen minutes. Influenced by the crowd's fierce reaction, the judges reevaluated the routine and inflated Nemov's score to 9.762.
- While leading in the men's marathon with less than 10 kilometres to go, Brazilian runner Vanderlei de Lima was attacked by de-frocked Irish priest Neil Horan and dragged into the crowd. De Lima recovered to take bronze, and was later awarded the Pierre de Coubertin medal for sportsmanship.
- Hungarian fencing official Joszef Hidasi was suspended for two years by the FIE after committing six errors in favour of Italy during the gold-medal match in men's team foil, denying the Chinese opponent the gold medal.
- Canadian men's rowing pair Chris Jarvis and David Calder were disqualified in the semi-final round after they crossed into the lane belonging to the South African team, interfering with their progress. The Canadians appealed unsuccessfully to the Court of Arbitration for Sport.
- In the women's 100 m hurdles, Canadian sprinter Perdita Felicien stepped on the first hurdle, tumbling to the ground and taking Russian Irina Shevchenko with her. The Russian team filed an unsuccessful protest, pushing the medal ceremony back a day. Track officials debated for about two hours before rejecting the Russian arguments. The race was won by the United States' Joanna Hayes in Olympic-record time.
- Iranian judoka Arash Miresmaili was disqualified after he was found to be overweight before a judo bout against Israeli Ehud Vaks. He had gone on an eating binge the night before in a protest against the IOC's recognition of the state of Israel. It was reported that Iranian Olympic team chairman Nassrollah Sajadi had suggested that the Iranian government should give him $115,000 (the amount he would have received if he had won the gold medal) as a reward for his actions. Then-President of Iran, Mohammad Khatami, who was reported to have said that Arash's refusal to fight the Israeli would be "recorded in the history of Iranian glories", stated that the nation considered him to be "the champion of the 2004 Olympic Games".
- Pelle Svensson, a former two-time world champion (Greco-Roman 100 kg class) and member of board of FILA from 1990 to 2007, has described FILA as an inherently corrupt organization. During the Games, Svensson served as chairman of the disciplinary committee of FILA. As he was watching the final in the men's Greco-Roman wrestling 84 kg class between Alexei Michine from Russia and Ara Abrahamian from Sweden, Svensson witnessed how the Russian team leader Mikhail Mamiashvili was giving signs to the referee. When Svensson approached the official and informed him that this was not allowed according to the rules, Mamiashvili responded by saying, "you should know that this may lead to your death." Svensson later found proof that the Romanian referee was bribed (according to Svensson the referee had received over one million Swedish krona).

=== 2008 Summer Olympics – Beijing, China ===
- Players for the Spanish men's basketball teams posed for a pre-Olympic newspaper advertisement in popular Spanish daily Marca, in which they were pictured pulling back the skin on either side of their eyes, narrowing them in order to mimic the stereotypes of thin Asian eyes.
- Swedish wrestler Ara Abrahamian placed his bronze medal onto the floor immediately after it was placed around his neck in protest at his loss to Italian Andrea Minguzzi in the semifinals of the men's 84 kg Greco-Roman wrestling event. He was subsequently disqualified by the IOC, although his bronze medal was not awarded to Chinese wrestler Ma Sanyi, who finished fifth.
- Questions have been raised about the ages of two Chinese female gymnasts, He Kexin and Jiang Yuyuan. This is due partly to their youthful appearance, as well as a speech in 2007 by Chinese director of general administration for sport Liu Peng.
- Norway's last-second goal against South Korea in the handball semifinals put it through to the gold medal game, despite the ball possibly failing to have fully crossed the goal line prior to time expiring. The South Koreans protested and requested that the game continue into overtime. The IHF has confirmed the results of the match.
- Cuban taekwondo competitor Ángel Matos was banned for life from any international taekwondo events after kicking a referee in the face. Matos attacked the referee after he disqualified Matos for violating the time limit on an injury timeout. He then punched another official.
- China was criticized for their state run athlete training program.
- By April 2017, the 2008 Summer Olympics had the most (50) Olympic medals stripped for doping violations. The leading country is Russia with 14 medals stripped.

=== 2012 Summer Olympics – London, England, United Kingdom ===
- The North Korean women's football team delayed their game against Colombia for an hour after the players were introduced on the jumbo screen with the Flag of South Korea.
- Greek triple and long jumper Paraskevi Papachristou was expelled by the Greek Olympic Committee after posting a racist remark on social media.
- South Korean fencer Shin A-lam lost the semifinal match in the individual épée to Germany's Britta Heidemann, after a timekeeping error allowed Heidemann to score the winning point before time expired. Shin A-lam remained on the piste for over an hour while her appeal was considered, but the appeal was ultimately rejected and Germany advanced to play for the gold medal. Shin A-Lam was offered a consolation medal but declined the offer.
- In the men's team artistic gymnastics, Japan was promoted to the silver medal position after successfully lodging an appeal over Kōhei Uchimura's final pommel horse performance. His fall on the last piece of apparatus had initially relegated the Japanese to fourth, and elevated host Great Britain to silver, and Ukraine to bronze. Although the decision to upgrade the Japanese score was greeted with boos in the arena, the teams involved accepted the correction.
- Swiss footballer Michel Morganella was expelled from the Olympics after a racist comment on Twitter about Koreans after Switzerland lost 2–1 to South Korea.
- The men's light flyweight boxing gold medal match between Kaeo Pongprayoon of Thailand and Zou Shiming of China was marred by controversy. Zou, the Chinese fighter, won on a controversial decision. Pongprayoon was hit with a two-point penalty for an unclear offence with 9 seconds left in the bout to give the Chinese boxer the victory.
- During the semi-final women's football match between Canada and the United States, a time-wasting call was made against the Canadian goalkeeper, Erin McLeod, when she held the ball longer than the allowed six seconds. This violation is called in international play, and is intended to be used during instances of time-wasting. As a result, the American team was awarded an indirect free-kick in the box. On the ensuing play, Canada was penalized for a handball in the penalty box, with the American team being awarded a penalty kick, which Abby Wambach converted to tie the game at 3–3. The Americans went on to win the match in extra time, advancing to the gold medal game. FIFA responded by stating that the refereeing decisions were correct.
- The badminton women's doubles tournament became embroiled in controversy during the group stage when eight players (both pairs from South Korea and one pair each from China and Indonesia) were ejected from the tournament by the Badminton World Federation after being found guilty of "not using best efforts" and "conducting oneself in a manner that is clearly abusive or detrimental to the sport" by playing to lose matches in order to manipulate the draw for the knockout stage. In one match, both teams made a series of basic errors, and in another the longest rally was just four shots.
- In a men's bantamweight early round boxing match, Japanese boxer Satoshi Shimizu floored Magomed Abdulhamidov of Azerbaijan six times in the third round. The referee, Ishanguly Meretnyyazov of Turkmenistan, never scored a count in each of the six knockdowns and let the fight continue. Meretnyyazov claimed they were slips, and even fixed Abdulhamidov's headgear during the affair. Abdulhamidov had to be helped to his corner following the round. The fight was scored 22–17 in favour of Abdulhamidov. AIBA, the governing body for Olympic boxing, overturned the result following an appeal by Japan.
- By April 2017, the Olympics had 29 Olympic medals stripped for doping violations. The leading country is Russia with 13 medals stripped.

=== 2016 Summer Olympics – Rio de Janeiro, Brazil ===
- Russian doping scandal and participation restrictions -
- During a women's volleyball qualification tournament, a match between Japan and Thailand caused controversy after the Thai team were given two red cards during the final set. Japan finished the tournament third and qualified for the Olympics, while Thailand finished fifth and did not qualify. The FIVB declined to review the match.
- Islam El Shehaby, an Egyptian judoka, refused to shake hands and bow to his opponent after being defeated by the Israeli Or Sasson.
- Lochtegate: Ryan Lochte, Jimmy Feigen, Gunnar Bentz, and Jack Conger, allegedly vandalized a gas station bathroom, and were forced to pay for the damage by two security men who brandished a gun at the swimmers before a translator arrived. The swimmers later claimed to have been pulled over and robbed by gunmen wearing police uniforms. The Federal Police of Brazil detained Feigen, Bentz, and Conger (Lochte having already left the country) after it was determined that the swimmers had made false reports to the police of being robbed. All of the swimmers involved would receive various punishments and suspensions relating to their conduct during the incident by USA Swimming and USOC.
- During the weightlifting tournament, Iran's Behdad Salimi broke the world record in the snatch weightlifting of the Men's over 105-kilogram class, but was later disqualified in the clean and jerk stage. The Iranian National Olympic Committee filed an appeal to the Court of Arbitration for Sport against the International Weightlifting Federation (IWF), and the IWF's website was hacked by protestors. The CAS dismissed the appeal due to a lack of evidence that the disqualification was made in bad faith.
- Nine Australian athletes had their passports seized by Brazilian police and were fined R$10,000 (US$3,000) after it was revealed they had falsified their credentials in order to watch a basketball game between Serbia and Australia.
- During the second bronze medal match between Uzbekistan's Ikhtiyor Navruzov and Mongolia's Ganzorigiin Mandakhnaran in the 65 kg freestyle wrestling, Mandakhnaran held a lead of 7-6 near the end of the match and began celebrating before it had concluded. In response, Ikhtiyor was awarded a penalty point for Mandakhnaran "failing to engage" during the end of the match, which resulted in a 7–7 draw. Ikhtiyor won the game and the bronze due to being the last to score. The Mongolian coaches protested the point, which could not be challenged, by stripping in front of the judges on the mat, resulting in a shoe being sent into the judges' table. Ikhtiyor was awarded a second penalty point as the coaches were escorted away from the mat, leading to the final score being 7–8.
- Controversy surrounded the new judging system in boxing; the new counting system had five judges who judged each bout, and a computer randomly selected three whose scores are counted. Traditionally, judges would use a computer scoring system to count each punch landed, but in 2016 the winner of each round was awarded 10 points and the loser a lower number, based on criteria which includes the quality of punches landed, effective aggression and tactical superiority. Two results in particular attracted controversy, both involving Russian athletes whose victories were put in question: the defeat of Vasily Levit by Russian Evgeny Tishchenko in the men's heavyweight gold-medal fight and the defeat of Michael Conlan by Vladimir Nikitin in the men's bantamweight quarter-final, after which Conlan accused AIBA and the Russian team of cheating, even tweeting to President of Russia Vladimir Putin, "Hey Vlad, how much did they charge you bro??". The AIBA removed an unspecified number of judges and referees following the controversy, stating that they "determined that less than a handful of the decisions were not at the level expected" and "that the concerned referees and judges will no longer officiate at the Rio 2016 Olympic Games"; however, the original decisions stood.
- In December 2016, Russian boxer Misha Aloyan was stripped of the silver medal in 52 kg boxing at the Games for testing positive for tuaminoheptane.

=== 2020 Summer Olympics – Tokyo, Japan ===
- In the wake of the global COVID-19 pandemic, the Games were postponed for the first time in the 124-year history of the modern Olympics. The Games were held in July and August 2021, despite many concerns that the Delta variant of COVID-19 posed a serious threat.
- Fethi Nourine, an Algerian judoka competing in the men's 73 kg class, was sent home from the Tokyo Olympics after he withdrew from the competition after refusing to compete against an Israeli opponent, Tohar Butbul. The International Judo Federation (IJF) announced the immediate suspension of Nourine and his coach on 24 July 2021, pending a further investigation, while the Algerian Olympic Committee revoked their accreditation, and sent Nourine and his coach back home to Algeria. Nourine and coach Amar Benikhlef were banned from international competition for ten years.
- Oceania's rhythmic gymnastics qualification for the Tokyo Olympics was conducted with severe breaches that resulted in change of ranking for Olympic nomination and selection. A 1.5-year-long investigation by Gymnastics Ethics Foundation found serious misconduct by qualification event's organisers, administrators and officials. As a result, Gymnastics Australia, Oceania Gymnastics Union, an administrator and two judges were sanctioned.

=== 2024 Summer Olympics – Paris, France ===
- Canada Soccer drone spying scandal: In July 2024, staff from the Canadian Soccer Association were discovered to be using drone surveillance to spy on a training session for the New Zealand women's national football team at the 2024 Summer Olympics.
- Palestinian sports organizations and sports organizations from Arab countries have called for sanctions to be imposed against Israel and to prevent its participation in the 2024 Summer Olympics due to the Gaza war in the Gaza Strip. The calls from the organizations have been prompted by concerns about the war's impact on Palestinian athletes and sports facilities.
- Imane Khelif: after she faced intense public scrutiny over her eligibility to compete in the women's category, including from celebrities and world leaders. Khelif became the target of online abuse and misinformation, such as false claims that she was a man. In response, Khelif said that the backlash she received "harms human dignity" and called for an end to the bullying of athletes. Khelif filed a criminal complaint in France against unspecified individuals for cyberbullying, naming in it J. K. Rowling and Elon Musk among others.
- Representatives of the organizations Safe Space Club and Right to Equality have criticized the Dutch Volleyball Association and Dutch Olympic organizers' decision to allow convicted child rapist Steven van de Velde to represent the Netherlands in the 2024 Summer Olympics. General director of the Dutch Volleyball Association Michel Everaert announced the organization's support for van de Velde's participation and the Dutch Olympic Committee stated, "Van de Velde now meets all the qualification requirements for the Olympic Games and is therefore part of the team."
- The Olympic Council of Malaysia received widespread online backlash in response to the release of their 2024 official attire. The critiques of the attire focused largely on the visual design, which some individuals felt was overly simple and unattractive. In response to the criticism, Malaysia released re-designed official attire for the 2024 Malaysian Olympic team.

== Winter Olympics ==
=== 1924 Winter Olympics – Chamonix, France ===
- In the 500-metre speed skating race, the Norwegian team contended the event had been hand timed incorrectly in favor of American gold medalist Charles Jewtraw. Jewtraw won over Norwegian Oskar Olsen by a fifth of a second.

=== 1928 Winter Olympics – St Moritz, Switzerland ===
- In the 10,000-metre speed skating race, American Irving Jaffee was leading the competition, having outskated Norwegian defending world champion Bernt Evensen in their heat, when rising temperatures thawed the ice. In a controversial ruling, the Norwegian referee canceled the entire competition. Although the IOC reversed the referee's decision and awarded Jaffee the gold medal, the International Skating Union later overruled the IOC and restored the ruling. Evensen, for his part, publicly said that Jaffee should be awarded the gold medal, but that never happened.

=== 1932 Winter Olympics – Lake Placid, New York, United States ===
- The bobsledding venue was set to be constructed on the land of the Lake Placid Club, which caused controversy as the club had an exclusionary policy towards Jews. A solution was found where the land for the bobsledding run would become public land.
- A major controversy in speed skating came when organizers decided to hold competitions under "North American rules", where six speed skaters raced each other at a time instead of the usual two. Finland's Clas Thunberg, who had won seven medals at the previous two Olympics, refused to participate in disgust.

=== 1936 Winter Olympics – Garmisch-Partenkirchen, Germany ===
- Austrian and Swiss alpine skiers boycotted the event after the IOC ruled that ski instructors could not compete in the Olympics due to being considered professionals.

=== 1940 and 1944 Winter Olympics (not held due to World War II) ===
- The 1940 and 1944 Winter Olympics were cancelled due to World War II. The IOC controversially awarded Garmisch-Partenkirchen, Germany hosting rights on June 9, 1939, fifteen months after the German invasion of Austria. Sapporo and St. Moritz had previously withdrawn.

=== 1948 Winter Olympics – St. Moritz, Switzerland ===
- In the ice hockey tournament, two teams from the United States representing different federations sent their own teams. The IOC voted to bar both teams from the Games, but the Swiss organizing committee allowed the American Hockey Association team to take part. The team finished fourth, but a year later the IOC disqualified both United States teams.
- The bobsled events were marred by allegations of sabotage, after the steering on the United States sleds was reportedly tampered with. A truck driver later admitted to causing the damage by accidentally backing into the shed where the sleds were kept.

=== 1952 Winter Olympics – Oslo, Norway ===
- In the bobsledders competition, Andreas Ostler and Lorenz Nieberl (From the Germany Team) each won 2 medals. However, other teams complained that the size and momentum of the bobsleigh is not fair to them due to theirs being over 1000 pounds (Around 454 kg). Therefore, after the Oslo Winter Games, a weight limit of 880 pounds (400 kg) was enforced.

=== 1960 Winter Olympics – Squaw Valley, California, United States ===
- The organizing committee controversially refused to construct a bobsled track for the Games, making 1960 the only Winter Olympics where bobsledding events were not held.

=== 1964 Winter Olympics – Innsbruck, Austria ===
- Two athletes died during training: British luger Kazimierz Kay-Skrzypecki and Australian alpine skier Ross Milne. There were complaints that the tracks were not safe.

=== 1968 Winter Olympics – Grenoble, France ===
- French skier Jean-Claude Killy achieved a clean sweep of the then-three alpine skiing medals at Grenoble, but only after what the IOC bills as the "greatest controversy in the history of the Winter Olympics". The slalom run was held in poor visibility and Austrian skier Karl Schranz claimed a course patrolman crossed his path during the slalom race, causing him to stop. Schranz was given a restart and posted the fastest time. A Jury of Appeal then reviewed the television footage, declared that Schranz had missed a gate on the upper part of the first run, annulled his repeat run time, and gave the medal to Killy.
- Three East German competitors in the women's luge event were disqualified for illegally heating their runners prior to each run.

=== 1972 Winter Olympics – Sapporo, Japan ===
- Austrian skier Karl Schranz, a vocal critic of then-IOC president Avery Brundage and reportedly earning $50,000 a year at the time, was singled out for his status as a covertly professional athlete, notably for his relationship with the ski manufacturer Kneissl, and ejected from the games. Schranz's case was particularly high-profile because of the disqualification controversy centring on him at the 1968 games and Schranz's subsequent dominance of alpine skiing in the Skiing World Cups of 1969 and 1970. Brundage's twenty-year reign as President of the IOC ended six months later and subsequent presidents have been limited to terms of eight years, renewable once for four years.
- The Canadian ice hockey team boycotted the Games due to the IOC not allowing them to use professional players. Canada had expressed concerns that Soviet athletes were de facto professionals as they were paid by the state.

=== 1976 Winter Olympics – Innsbruck, Austria ===
- The chosen location for the 1976 Winter Olympics was originally Denver, Colorado. However, after the city's voters rejected partially funding the Games, they were relocated to Innsbruck, Austria. Innsbruck previously hosted the 1964 Games.

=== 1980 Winter Olympics – Lake Placid, New York, United States ===
- Taiwan (The Republic of China) did not participate in the Games over the IOC's recognition of the People's Republic of China as "China", and its request for Taiwan to compete as "Chinese Taipei". Taiwan missed the 1976 Montreal Summer Games and 1980 Moscow Summer Games for the same reason. It returned to the Games in 1984.
- The Olympic Village was built with the goal of subsequently converting it into a federal prison. Athletes and activists protested the decision.

=== 1988 Winter Olympics – Calgary, Canada ===
- A series of ticket-related scandals plagued the organizing committee as the Games approached, resulting in widespread public anger.
- Austrian Olympic team physician Joerg Oberhammer died after falling into the path of a snow-grooming machine after colliding with another skier between runs of the men's giant slalom.

=== 1992 Winter Olympics – Tignes-Albertville, France ===
- Swiss speed skier Nicolas Bochatay died after crashing into a snow machine during practice.

=== 1994 Winter Olympics – Lillehammer, Norway ===
- Jeff Gillooly, the ex-husband of U.S. figure skater Tonya Harding, arranged for an attack on her closest American rival, Nancy Kerrigan, a month before the start of the Games. Both women competed, with Kerrigan winning the silver and Harding performing poorly. Harding was later banned for life both from competing in USFSA-sanctioned events and from becoming a sanctioned coach.

=== 1998 Winter Olympics – Nagano, Japan ===
- At the 1998 Winter Olympics in Nagano, Japan, a judge in the ice dancing event tape-recorded another judge trying to pre-ordain the results. Dick Pound, a prominent IOC official, said soon afterward that ice dancing should be stripped of its status as an Olympic event unless it could clean up the perception that its judging is corrupt.
- Canadian gold medalist snowboarder Ross Rebagliati was disqualified for marijuana being found in his system. The IOC reinstated the medal days later.

=== 2002 Winter Olympics – Salt Lake City, Utah, United States ===
- Two sets of gold medals were awarded in pairs figure skating, to Canadian pair Jamie Salé and David Pelletier and to Russian pair Elena Berezhnaya and Anton Sikharulidze, after allegations of collusion among judges in favour of the Russian pair.
- Three cross-country skiers, Spaniard Johann Mühlegg and Russians Larissa Lazutina and Olga Danilova, were disqualified after blood tests indicated the use of darbepoetin. Following a December 2003 ruling by the Court of Arbitration for Sport (CAS), the IOC withdrew all the doped athletes' medals from the Games, amending the result lists accordingly.
- Salt Lake City's bid committee was caught in a bribery scandal, which led to the expulsion of six IOC members.

=== 2006 Winter Olympics – Turin, Italy ===
- Members of the Austrian biathlon team had their Olympic Village residences raided by Italian authorities, who were investigating doping charges.
- Russian biathlete Olga Medvedtseva was stripped of her silver medal won in the individual race, due to positive drug test. A two-year ban from any competition was imposed.

=== 2010 Winter Olympics – Vancouver, Canada ===
- Georgian luger Nodar Kumaritashvili died during training after losing control of his sled and crashing into an unpadded steel pillar. The starting spot was subsequently lowered to decrease the track speed, and a wall was erected to cover the pillars.

=== 2014 Winter Olympics – Sochi, Russia ===
- In August 2008, the government of Georgia called for a boycott of the Games in response to Russia's participation in the 2008 South Ossetia war. The IOC responded to concerns about the status of the 2014 games by stating that it was "premature to make judgments about how events happening today might sit with an event taking place six years from now".
- In mid-2013, a number of organizations, including Human Rights Watch, began calling for a boycott of the Games due to oppressive and homophobic legislation that bans 'gay propaganda', including the open acknowledgement of gay identities, the display of rainbow flags and public displays of affection between same-sex couples.
- Severe cost overruns made the 2014 Winter Olympics the most expensive Olympics in history, with allegations of corruption among government officials, and of close relationships between the government and construction firms. While originally budgeted at US$12 billion, various factors caused the budget to expand to US$51 billion, surpassing the estimated $44 billion cost of the 2008 Summer Olympics in Beijing.
- Lebanese skier Jackie Chamoun, who had a photo shoot taken of her wearing nothing but ski boots and a thong, had the Lebanese government claim that she damaged the reputation of her country.
- Doping in Russia. Richard McLaren published two reports in 2016 claiming that from "at least late 2011 to 2015" more than 1,000 Russian competitors in various sports, including summer, winter, and Paralympic sports, benefited from a doping cover-up. As of 25 December 2015, 43 Russian athletes who competed in Sochi have been disqualified, with 13 medals removed.

=== 2018 Winter Olympics – PyeongChang, Republic of Korea ===
- Russia was banned by the IOC from attending the Games due to state-sponsored doping. Their athletes participated as the Olympic Athletes from Russia.
- Kei Saito, a Japanese Short Track Speed Skater was suspended after being caught doping.

=== 2022 Winter Olympics – Beijing, China ===
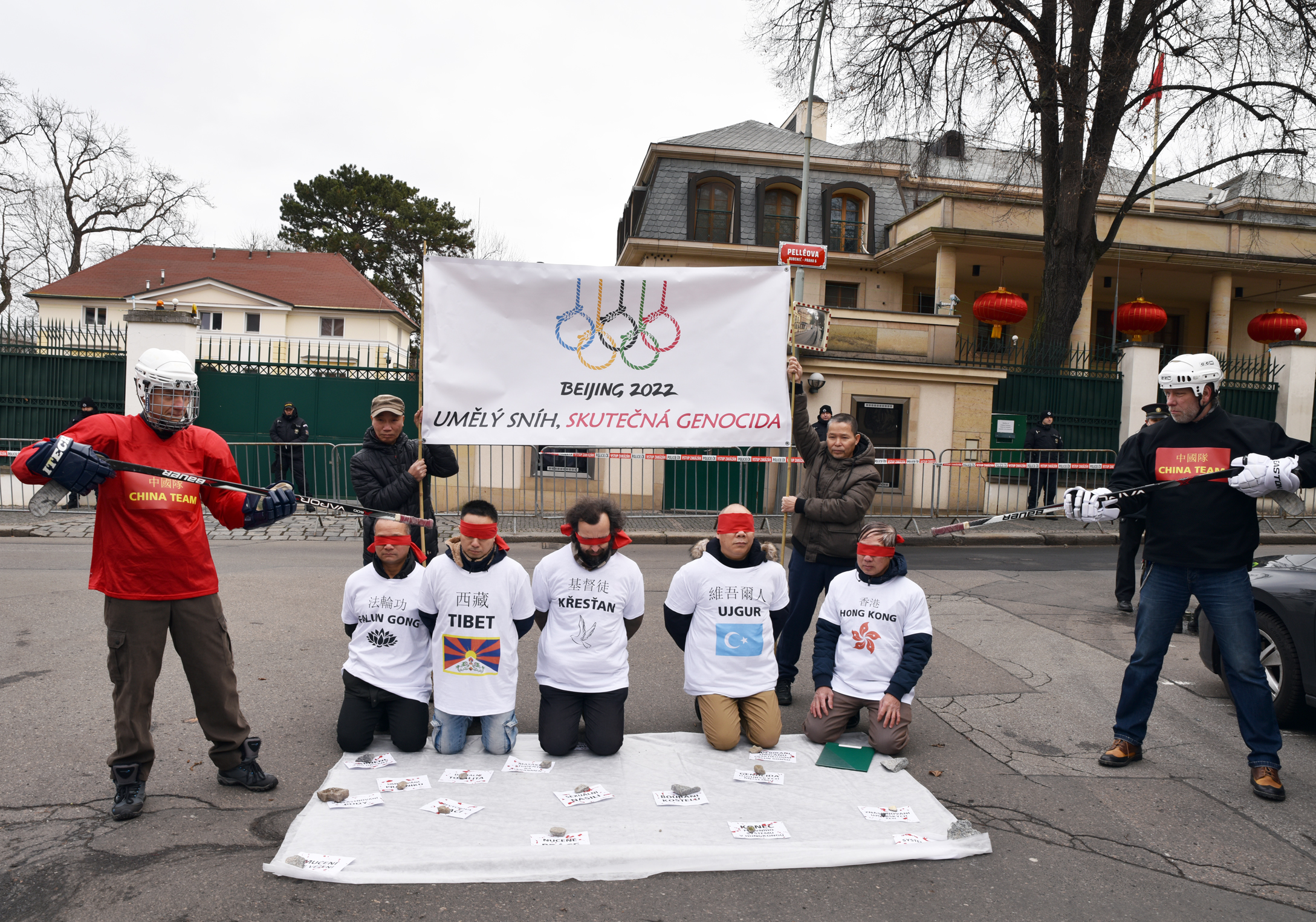
Protest in front of the Chinese embassy in Prague, 4 February 2022. The banner reads "Artificial snow, real genocide".

- Despite having more cities interested in this Olympics, the bidding process experienced the most dramatic bids withdrawals ever seen. This means when the candidate stage was reached, only three candidates remained. However, Oslo then pulled out, with the process continued with the two remaining candidates (Almaty and Beijing).
- Lithuania, Canada, Australia, the United Kingdom, and the United States applied diplomatic boycotts to the Games due to the Uighur Genocide and human rights in Tibet.
- Japanese government delegates did not attend the Olympics but still sent their team to compete.

== See also ==
- Doping at the Olympic Games
- List of Olympic Games boycotts
- List of stripped Olympic medals
- Olympic and Paralympic deaths
