= 2024 Malaysia Olympic attire controversy =

Clothing controversy in sports

On June 24, 2024, the Olympic Council of Malaysia unveiled the official attire for the 2024 Summer Olympics. The attire was met with controversy from the public due to its "cheap-looking" design.

== Background ==
The unveiling ceremony was held at The Exchange TRX in Kuala Lumpur.

== Controversy ==
The controversy started in the comments on social media from the OCM posting on the official attire's unveiling. One of the commenters asked if it was designed by a schoolkid. Others said that were not pleased that they were revealed on mannequins. Some of the public used artificial intelligence to come up with other designs.

== Aftermath ==
The OCM said that they will ask the public to design the 2028 Summer Olympics. A new attire was introduced based by the feedback from the previous attire. The new attire was created for only 25 athletes taking part in the games.
