= Paolo Petrecca =

Italian journalist

Paolo Petrecca (born 25 February 1964) is an Italian journalist. He was the director of Rai Sport, the sports division of Italian state-owned broadcaster RAI.

He was director of Rai News 24, Televideo and Rainews.it and director of Rai Sport for two years, a role for which he resigned on 2026, for gaffes on the Italian commentary of opening ceremony in Winter Olympics.
