= Simone Ferrari (creative director) =

Italian creative director

- Occupations: Creative director, director
- Years active: 2010s–present
- Employer: Balich Wonder Studio
- Known for: Live events, television, and international ceremonies

Simone Ferrari is an Italian creative director and director working across theatre, music, television, and large-scale live events, including ceremonies and fashion productions. His work has focused on large-scale productions combining performance, music, and visual direction. He is the Chief Creative Officer at Balich Wonder Studio, an international live entertainment production company.

== Career ==
Ferrari has worked in live event production and show direction, focusing on large-scale performances. He later joined Balich Wonder Studio, where he became Chief Creative Officer.

=== Ceremonies ===
Ferrari has been involved in international ceremonies and large public events. He was a part of the creative team for the closing ceremony of the 2014 Winter Paralympics in Sochi. In 2017, he was creative and show director of the closing ceremony of the Asian Indoor and Martial Arts Games in Ashgabat, where he was described as one of the youngest directors to lead a production of this scale.

In 2025, he served as executive creative director for the opening ceremony of the Special Olympics in Italy, produced by Balich Wonder Studio.

For the 2026 Winter Olympics in Milan and Cortina d'Ampezzo, Ferrari serves as Creative Director and Deputy Creative Lead of the opening ceremony, also produced by the studio.

=== Television ===
In 2018, Ferrari served as creative and show director of the Italian version of X Factor, overseeing the creative direction of its twelfth and thirteenth seasons. Coverage of the twelfth season included commentary by television critic Aldo Grasso in Corriere della Sera, who described it as "majestic" and noted its staging and visual design.

=== Live events and performances ===
Ferrari's work includes theatre productions as well as large-scale live performances. In 2021, he directed Paradiso XXXIII, based on Dante's "Divine Comedy", commissioned by the Presidency of the Italian Republic and performed in Italian theatres, with Elio Germano as a central performer.

Between 2018 and 2023, he collaborated with Cirque du Soleil on several projects, including Sarwat Watan (2022), a production combining elements of contemporary circus and theatre. His work has also extended to fashion and cultural events. In 2023, he contributed to a Cartier high jewelry presentation in Florence.

In 2024, Ferrari worked as creative and show director for Italian artist Ghali's live tour. His work has included collaborations with music artists such as Måneskin. In 2025, he co-directed The Headlands with Lulu Helbæk, a theatre production written by playwright Christopher Chen.

== Selected works ==
- 2014 – Winter Paralympics Closing Ceremony (Sochi) – Creative team member
- 2017 – Asian Indoor and Martial Arts Games Closing Ceremony – Creative and Show Director
- 2018 – X Factor Italy (Season 12–13) – Creative Director
- 2021 – Paradiso XXXIII – Director
- 2022 – Sarwat Watan – Director and Author
- 2023 – Cartier High Jewelry Show (Florence) – Creative and Show Director
- 2024 – Ghali Live Tour – Creative and Show Director
- 2025 – Special Olympics Opening Ceremony (Italy) – Executive Creative Director
- 2025 – The Headlands – Director and Set Designer
- 2026 – Winter Olympics Opening Ceremony (Milan–Cortina) – Creative Director and Deputy Creative Lead
