= Hondurasgate =

2026 Honduran political scandal

Hondurasgate (Note: The name combines Honduras with the -gate suffix, the latter being used for scandals, originating with the Watergate scandal.) is the name given to a series of alleged leaks of conversations via audio between right-wing political figures in the Americas including former Honduran President Juan Orlando Hernández and current President Nasry Asfura that revealed an international plan to return Hernández to the presidency by assassinating and jailing political opponents, expanding economic zones free of government oversight, building a United States military base in Honduras, bribing elected officials, and financing right-wing propaganda outlets using public funds. The audio also implied the participation of political actors from the United States and Israel to influence politics in Honduras. They were published in April 2026 by the website hondurasgate.ch and the Spanish media outlet Canal Red.

== Background ==
In July 2025, an alleged leaked 25-second audio circulated on social media of the president of the National Electoral Council of Honduras (CNE), Cosette López, talking about the approval of the Transmission of Preliminary Electoral Results (TREP) system. One of the disseminators of the audio was a fake page that impersonated the media outlet Radio Cadena Voces. Later, on November 29 of the same year, Attorney General Johel Zelaya publicly exposed a series of 24 audios that again implicated López and other actors in a plan to boycott the future general elections and provoke them to be repeated. The audios were delivered to the Public Prosecutor's Office on a USB stick by Marlon Ochoa, a CNE councilor chosen by the leftist Liberty and Refoundation party, and released without an authentication process. López's defense requested that the Public Prosecutor's Office carry out an expert examination of these audios to verify their authenticity. The request was rejected since López was not listed as a defendant in the case promoted by the Public Prosecutor's Office. In December 2025, Hernández was pardoned by United States president Donald Trump after Hernández was convicted and sentenced in the United States in 2024 to 45 years in prison for conspiring with drug cartels during his presidential tenure to smuggle over 400 tons of cocaine through Honduras into the United States.

== Contents ==
The audios are fragments of conversations of people identified as former military officer and former right-wing presidential candidate Romeo Vásquez Velásquez, deputy of the Liberal Party Jorge Cálix, Orlando Hernández, president Nasry Asfura, presidente of the Congress Tomás Zambrano, counselor of the National Electoral Council Cosette López, vice president María Antonieta Mejía and former magistrate of the abolished Supreme Electoral Tribunal David Matamoros.

=== Interference in Honduras' politics ===
The audios allegedly reveal an international plan to restore Hernández to power and push for the Zone for Employment and Economic Development. The plan would include the use of evangelical churches so that "people forget the past," according to instructions given by Hernández to Tomás Zambrano. At the same time, the plot contemplates the expansion of the U.S. military presence at strategic points in Honduras, such as the José Enrique Soto Cano air base. Likewise, President Asfura would have agreed to hand over key projects, such as the interoceanic train, to companies such as General Electric.

=== Interference outside of Honduras ===
In the international arena, Hondurasgate described a strategy aimed at undermining the political stability of the administrations of Claudia Sheinbaum in Mexico and Gustavo Petro in Colombia. Hernández reportedly requested funds to establish a U.S.-based "digital journalism unit" to disseminate fabricated "dossiers" on the Sheinbaum and Petro administrations without the operations being traced back to Honduras.

Hernández stated that the purpose of his pardon by United States president Donald Trump was to help organize opposition to left-wing governments in Latin America and that Israeli prime minister Benjamin Netanyahu had been instrumental in orchestrating his pardon. Hernández stated that Argentine president Javier Milei had contributed $350,000 to his operation.

== Reactions ==
Hernández claimed that the voice in the recordings was not his. An analysis by research group Earshot of three of the recordings found "with a moderate degree of confidence" that they were "authentic recordings of Hernández and Asfura’s voices and are likely not AI generated."

== See also ==
- Operation Condor – US-backed repression campaign in South America
- Iran–Contra affair – 1985–1987 political scandal in the U.S.
- Western Hemisphere Institute for Security Cooperation – United States Department of Defense school at Fort Benning in Columbus, Georgia
- 2009 Honduran coup d'état – Military overthrow of Honduran president
- Monroe Doctrine – 1823 U.S. foreign policy on the Western Hemisphere
- Donroe Doctrine – Donald Trump's foreign policy in the Americas
- 2026 United States intervention in Venezuela – Airstrikes and capture of Nicolás Maduro
- Corruption in Honduras
- Foreign interventions by the United States
- United States involvement in regime change – List of U.S.-backed regime change operations
