= Coffee production in Honduras =

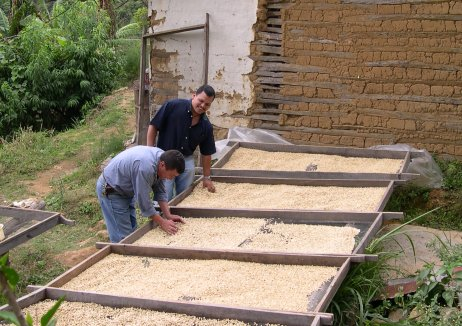
Drying organic coffee produced in San Juancito, Honduras.

Coffee production in Honduras played a significant role in the country's history and is important to the Honduran economy. In 2011, the country became Central America's top producer of coffee.

== History ==
19th century

The cultivation of the coffee plant was in its infancy in the Republic of Honduras at the end of the 19th century. While there were numerous coffee plantations at the time, they were small. The soil, climate, and conditions in Honduras are the same as those of Guatemala, Nicaragua, or Costa Rica. The drawback in Honduras was lack of means of transportation and facilities for shipment to the coast. There was practically no exportation of coffee from Honduras, the product was mostly sold domestically. A new plantation of coffee would begin to produce a profit by the end of the fourth year after planting, and after the seventh year a profit of from 100 to 300 per cent on the capital invested could be expected. The production of coffee in 1894 was reckoned at 20,000 quintals, of which only 10 per cent was exported. The exportation was from the southern Pacific port of Amapala and the northern, deep water, Caribbean port of Puerto Cortes. In 1900, Honduras exported 54,510 pesos' worth of coffee.

== See also ==
- List of countries by coffee production
