= Squatting in Honduras =

Honduras on the globe

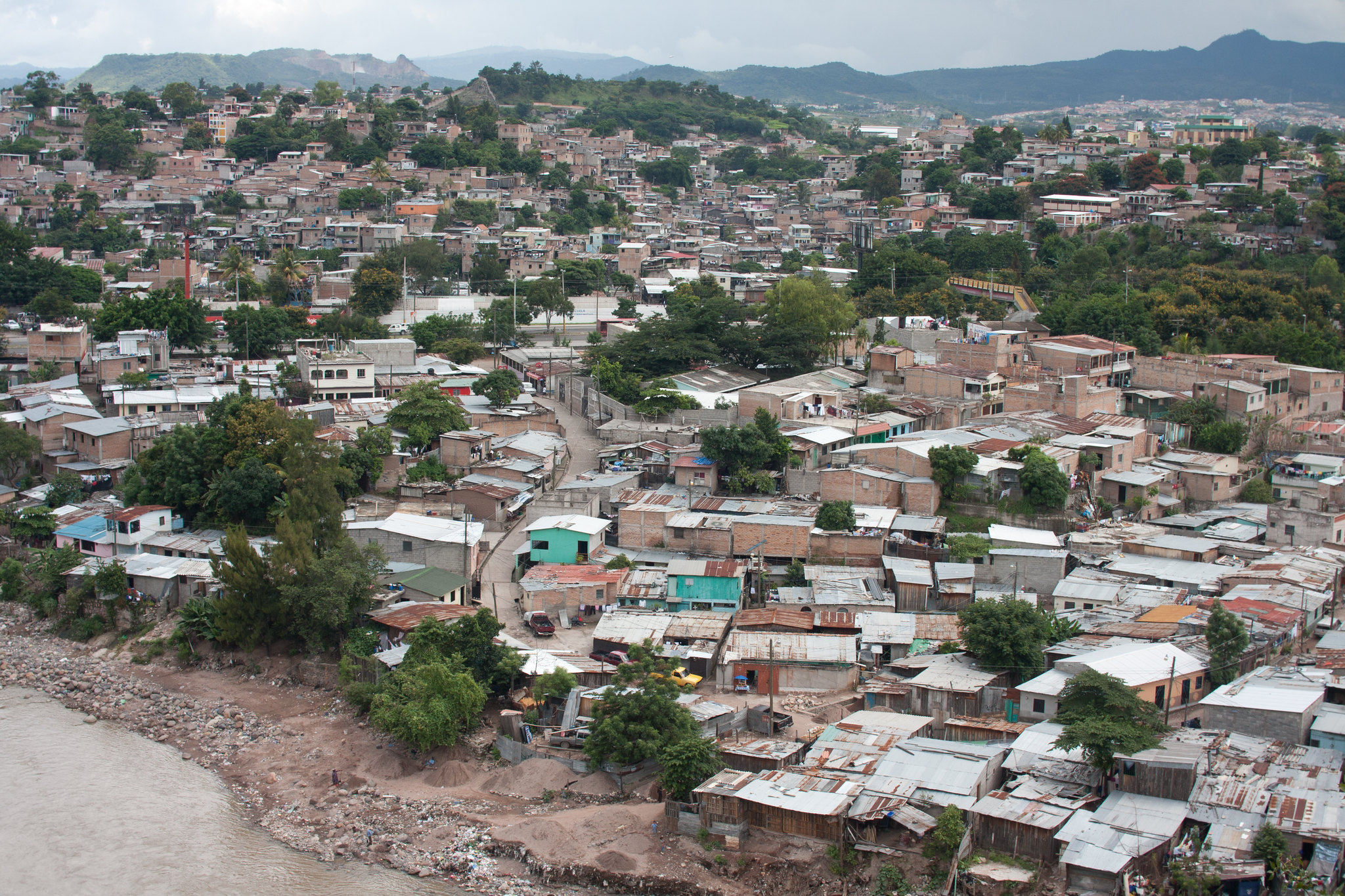
An informal settlement in Tegucigalpa

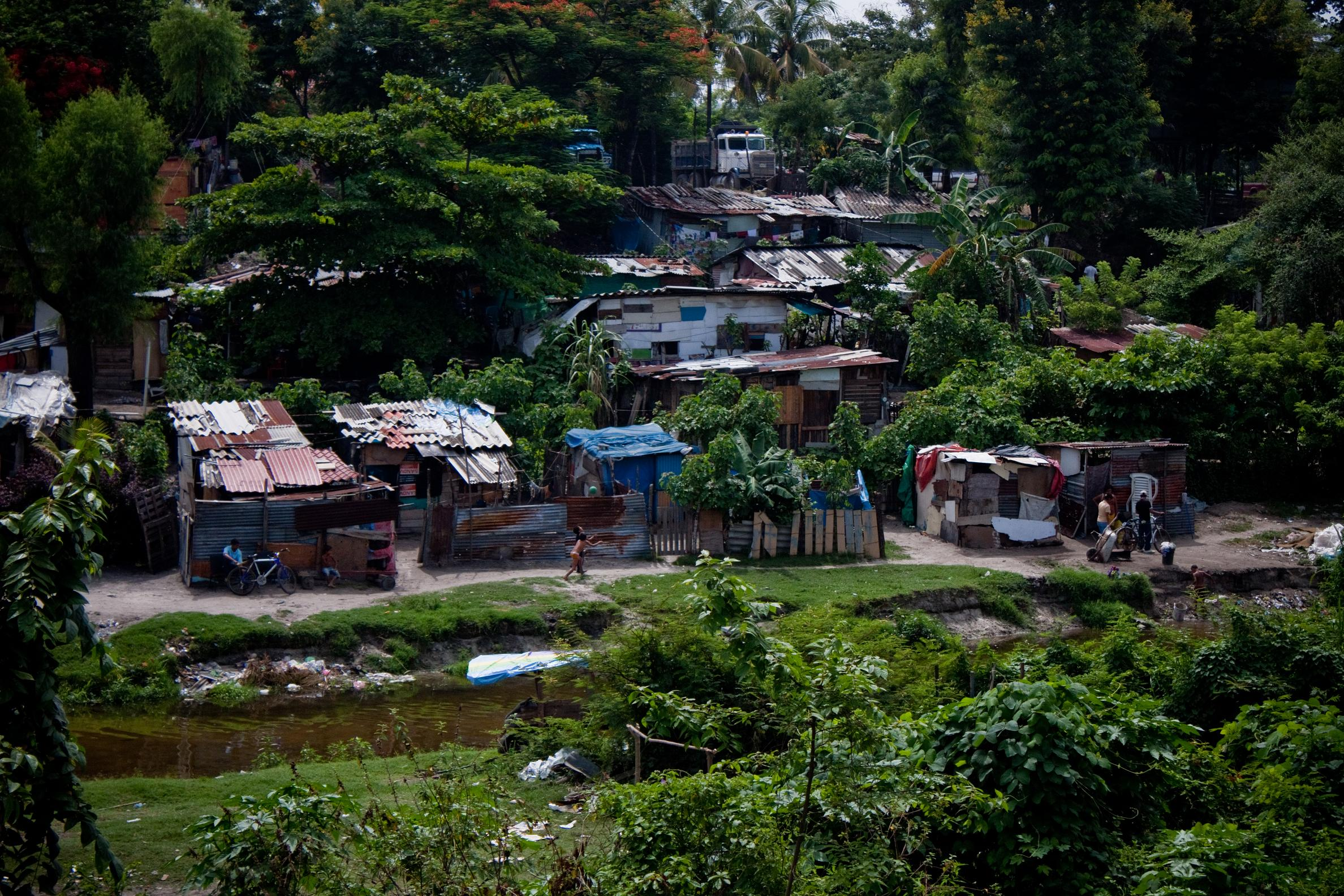
Shacks in San Pedro Sula

Squatting in Honduras is the occupation of unused land or derelict buildings without the permission of the owner. As the population of Honduras grew from the 1960s onwards, peasants occupied land. The Government of Honduras responded by giving peasants title to land and deporting Salvadoran migrants. The measures had limited success and in the 2010s, squatters continued to self-organise land invasions. The indigenous Miskito people are affected by squatters who practice illegal logging and drugs trafficking.

== History ==
The population of Honduras rose to almost 2 million people by the 1960s and was boosted by 300,000 migrants from El Salvador, causing peasants in need of land to start squatting. The Government of Honduras responded with various measures giving peasants title to land, so that up to 1975, 120,000 hectares were given to 35,000 households. Salvadoran migrants were deported and this contributed to the outbreak of the Football War in 1969.

Until the 1980s, there was little large-scale agriculture and most land was used by subsistence farmers or small coffee producers. In 1980, an estimated 75% of farmers did not own the land they were farming. Decree number 78 or the "Coffee Enterprise Protection Law", was introduced in 1981 as part of a plan by the government to regularize land titles which had limited success.

In 1996, the Honduran Army evicted squatters from land at Tacamiche, south of San Pedro Sula, which belonged to Chiquita Brands International, the banana distributors. The 400 peasants had occupied the land since 1994, when Chiquita closed down the farm.

== 2010s ==
On International Peasant Day of Struggle in 2012, 3,500 peasant families squatted land across the country in a co-ordinated protest. They occupied areas in eight provinces and claimed they could grow food on them because they were publicly owned, whereas the National Agrarian Institute said it owned the land and blamed insurrectionary attitudes. A former sugar plantation near to the capital Tegucigalpa was quickly evicted without violence and Via Campesina stated the occupations were peaceful. Around Trujillo, Garifuna people squat land owned by foreigners and are evicted by the Army.

The indigenous Miskito people on the Caribbean coast asked for help in 2015, after a spate of land invasions by loggers and drugs traffickers. These squatters chopped down trees and build airstrips for transporting drugs. After a 25 year campaign, the indigenous peoples of La Mosquitia gained title to their lands in 2012. Fifty communities stretched along the coast were recognised as owners of 14,000km² of land. In Roatán, an island lying north of Honduras, confusion over land titling led to squatters confronting the authorities in 2018.
