= Prostitution in Honduras =

Prostitution in Honduras is currently legal, as there is no law prohibiting prostitution. Although similar institutions such as brothel ownership and pimping are illegal in Honduras, prostitution has remained largely unchecked by the government. UNAIDS estimate there to be 22,771 prostitutes in the country.

Lack of enforcement of current laws has created a profitable business out of prostitution - one in which both adults and children are a part. There are many causes to the high rates of involvement amongst the women and teens in cities, but the main reason is the high poverty levels. Participants see sex work as a viable option to escape poverty.

Prostitution poses risks to these sex workers, especially in terms of mental, physical, and sexual health effects. There are also worldwide effects due to prostitution out of Honduras and similar countries in Central America.

Honduras has tried to curb these effects but has yet to find a stable solution, despite numerous policy recommendations.

== Effects of adult prostitution ==
=== Mental and physical ===
According to a study, many commercial sex workers in cities, both men and women, are exposed to sexual and physical violence. 71.4% of street workers were exposed to violence/physical danger and almost 90% were exposed to sexual violence. On top of this, 73.5% of victims were physically abused in their childhood, which shows the origins of such mental and physical effects. For some workers, a lifestyle of abuse and exploitation is all they know.

Another important aspect is the correlation between prostitution and drug use amongst sex workers. In the same study, nearly 1 in 4 commercial sex workers abuse cocaine, which as a recreational drug, has its own physical effects.

In terms of mental effects, 63.3% of commercial sex workers have reported having suicidal behavior in life; this percentage was even higher amongst the women. It is clear that prostitution in Honduran urban centers has created negative mental health issues among those who work in the field.

=== Sexual ===
Contrary to the belief that prostitution equates to high levels of HIV/AIDS, a medical report from 2006 states that only 2.4% of its sample size of 790 female sex workers had HIV. They attribute this low number to the increase in the use of protection among sex workers. In fact, government STI prevention programs have been implemented since the early 2000s in cities across Honduras. Because prostitution is prolific in cities, these programs have proven extremely effective in reducing numbers of HIV incidents.

== Child prostitution ==
Honduras has unsuccessfully tried to curb child prostitution. Lax laws have turned child prostitution into a business that has created prostitution rings both within the country and trafficking to other countries, including the US.

The business continues to grow as children participate in sex work as a means of surviving.

Although this article is specific to Honduras, child prostitution can be viewed in Central America as a whole, because of the networks of prostitution rings from as north as southern Mexico to as south as Costa Rica.

=== Causes ===
The first cause is poverty. Prostitution becomes a source of economic opportunity where there is a space of economic regression. Surprisingly, many children who go into prostitution are forced by the parents in order to provide for the family, hence there were high levels of reported abuse in sex workers' childhoods. In a country where there are low literacy rates in rural areas, there is little opportunity to gain economic prosperity through education.

Exploiting this reality, sex-tourist agents go to the countryside to find these children and contract them out for work. The agents pay the parents large sums of money up front in exchange for contractual labor done by their children, a form of modern-day slavery.

Another cause is the promise for a better lifestyle. Some children willingly participate in the child prostitution industry because they believe the quality of life will be better than before. There have even been reports of some sex workers believing they would get trafficked into a better country where they could start anew. Unfortunately, some children are homeless or surrounded by gang activity and find similar outlets to survive.

=== Effects of sex work on children ===
There are dangerous physical and mental effects of sex work on children. They live in terrible conditions, are poorly fed and are often physically abused by their contractors if they do not deliver well on their jobs. Children suffer from mental illnesses such as anxiety and depression, but also a lack of confidence and self-worth because they are used as tools. Children have been found to struggle from Complex post-traumatic stress disorder as adults due to their experiences when younger.

In terms of health effects, children are more likely to suffer from life-threatening illnesses such as tuberculosis and HIV due to the amount of exposure to others in the work, and the immaturity of their bodies. Additionally, they are more susceptible to transferring STDs due to the ease with which their genitals can break.

=== Sex tourism ===
Sex tourism is an issue that is tied to child prostitution because of the large demand by older, adult men. Individuals from developed countries come to major Honduran cities like Tegucigalpa in order to have sex with minors because it is legal and cheap. The demand of these individuals further spurs the business, and is the reason for the creation of the sex work contractors.

Although pimping is considered illegal, it is commonplace and an industry has arisen through illegal tourism.

== Sex trafficking ==
Because of a low-cost and available population, trafficking has occurred both in and out of Honduras. These rings have extended their reach to even the United States. Here are a few reasons why sex trafficking occurs.

The first reason is deceit. Sex workers are lured with the promise of a better life, and are sold to wealthy people in the United States. On top of this, those already in the industry voluntarily go to the United States because they nrlieve there is an opportunity for a better life there.

Another reason is government corruption. Although trafficking is illegal, countries have reported government officials helping to smuggle persons and drafting fake documents to facilitate such smuggling.

The United States Department of State Office to Monitor and Combat Trafficking in Persons ranks Honduras as a 'Tier 2' country.

== Current Government Action / Policy ==
Honduras has struggled to make effective government policy to combat this issue. The country planned to implement a National Plan of Action to Eradicate Commercial Sexual Exploitation of Children, but the plan never came to fruition.

The United Nations, the United States, and other international bodies have recommended policy to end child prostitution and sex trafficking. The number one policy to be put in place is ensuring safe and viable routes to economic prosperity, which means increasing access to education. Other Central American countries such as Costa Rica have put in educational measures to ensure their young citizens have access to academic and career opportunity.

There is also the need for child protection services. This means a legal and societal framework to stop traffickers from recruiting these children - support through laws and the community. This policy is outlined in a report on child prostitution in Honduras by the United Nations Human Rights Council. Honduras has taken these policies into consideration, but whether they are realized remains to be seen.

Additionally, non-governmental organizations like Casa Alianza and the International Labour Organization's International Programme on the Elimination of Child Labour have created programs working alongside the Honduran Government to tackle this problem.
