= Hunger in Honduras =

Hunger in Honduras is a widespread issue that affects a significant portion of the population. As one of the poorest countries in Latin America, Honduras faces high levels of food insecurity, influenced by factors such as poverty, climate-related events, and limited access to resources and infrastructure. Rural areas are particularly impacted, with many households experiencing challenges in obtaining sufficient and nutritious food. Natural disasters, such as hurricanes and droughts, frequently disrupt agricultural production, leading to food shortages and economic difficulties. Various initiatives aim to address hunger in the country by improving food systems, enhancing resilience to climate impacts, and increasing access to nutritional support programs.

== About the Country ==
Honduras on a map.

Honduras flag.

Honduras is in the heart of Central America, bordering the Caribbean Sea, Pacific Ocean, Guatemala, El Salvador, and Nicaragua. It has an agriculture-based economy, focused on bananas, coffee, and palm oil, faces high poverty and inequality, with growth obstructed by external factors and internal corruption. There is high crime linked to drug trafficking and gangs, compounded by environmental issues like deforestation and hurricane vulnerability, which affects development. Honduras features a diverse culture of indigenous, Spanish, and African influences, with the Garifuna culture contributing significantly to its traditions and music.

== Statistics ==
Honduras has a population of 10.2 Million people, and 60% lives in extreme poverty. The cost to aid undernutrition and obesity in Honduras is US $2.3 billion. Almost a fifth of children under the age of 5 suffer from impaired growth due to malnutrition. This is called stunting. 23% of children between 6–59 months suffer from chronic malnutrition. These statistics are from 2024.

== Causes ==
The root cause of food insecurity in Honduras is poverty, with over 60 percent of the population living below the poverty line, and rural areas experiencing even higher rates of extreme poverty. Violence and regular climate-related disasters such as hurricanes, droughts, flooding, and land degradation have a particularly severe impact on poor and vulnerable populations. The El Niño phenomenon, for instance, has caused severe droughts that devastated the crops of subsistence farmers, further exacerbating food insecurity. Moderate economic growth coupled with rising inequality, displacement of communities due to high levels of crime and violence, and restricted access to basic social services also contribute to increasing food insecurity and malnutrition. Limited education about nutrition and a lack of dietary variety play a significant role in undernourishment, leading to nutrient deficiencies and stunting in children. Many communities, particularly in rural areas, face challenges in accessing essential services, which further compounds the issue. Addressing hunger in Honduras requires a multifaceted approach, including enhancing economic opportunities, improving resilience to climate shocks, and expanding access to nutritional education and social services to ensure food security for all citizens. Juan Orlando Hernández, formal Honduran president (2014-2022), managed a corrupt government causing massive destruction of institutionally and hunger, among others.

Women and indigenous populations are the most vulnerable, especially as a consequence of the COVID-19 pandemic. In regions like Honduras, the Central African Republic, Lesotho, and Somalia, the share of people facing severe food insecurity rose by over 10 percent, and the acute hunger situation is deteriorating.

== World Food Programme (WFP) ==
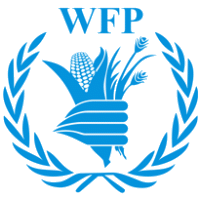
World Food Programme logo.

The WFP is a branch of the United Nations that combats hunger and food security around the world. They have an ongoing 5 year plan in Honduras in order to decrease malnutrition and food insecurity in the country, as well as increasing resilience to natural disasters and decreasing poverty. The WFP plans to collaborate with the Honduran government to address the underlying issues of food insecurity, malnutrition, and poverty, aiming to create healthier and more prosperous communities. The strategic plan will enhance diverse and resilient food systems and strengthen social protection and emergency response mechanisms to support vulnerable populations. It emphasizes building the capacity of local partners, promoting better dietary habits, advancing gender equality, and combating gender-based violence. This plan will adopt a nationwide approach, with an increased focus on urban and peri-urban areas compared to the previous plan. There are five outcomes the WFP expects from this plan. The first outcome claims crisis-affected populations will become less vulnerable as they secure their food and nutrition needs and enhance their resilience to future emergencies and climate shocks. The second outcome is that vulnerable populations in key rural and urban areas will enhance their livelihoods and income stability, leading to improved food security, nutrition, and sustainable climate-resilient food systems year-round. The third outcome states that by 2027, vulnerable populations in key rural and urban areas will have reliable access to social protection services that enhance food and nutrition security, contributing to human capital development in Honduras. The fourth outcome asserts that by the same year, the Government of Honduras will enhance its social protection systems and capacity to implement inclusive, gender-sensitive policies, increasing public trust in institutions. The fifth and final outcome is that key partners in Honduras benefit from efficient services throughout the entire process.

In 2023, they made significant strides in implementing its five-year strategic plan in Honduras. Collaborating closely with the Honduran government, WFP provided direct assistance to 1.3 million people, with an additional 1.2 million benefiting indirectly through improved assets, capacity building, and services. Key initiatives included the development of parametric microinsurance for smallholder farmers, cash-based transfers to Indigenous and Afro-descendant communities, and bolstering governmental capacities for anticipatory actions. These efforts have been instrumental in addressing the root causes of hunger and poverty, fostering healthier and more resilient communities across the nation.
