= Honduras and the World Bank =

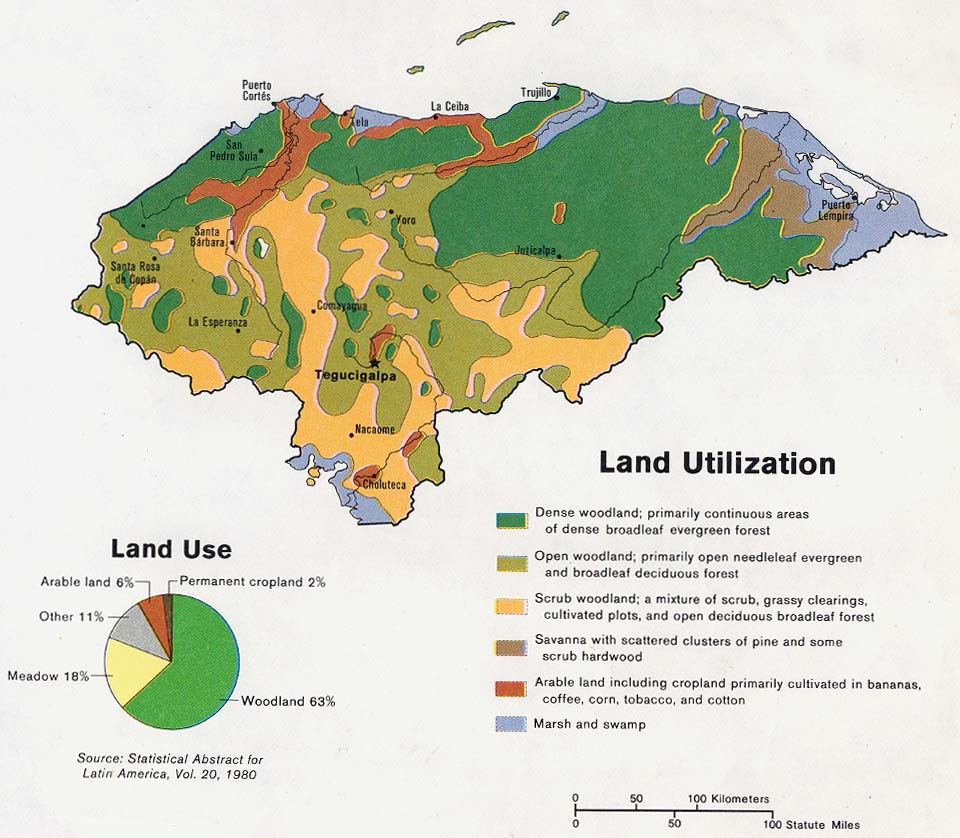
With a year-round tropical climate, the majority of Honduras is made up of expansive forest lands with very limited availability of arable land suitable for agricultural purposes.

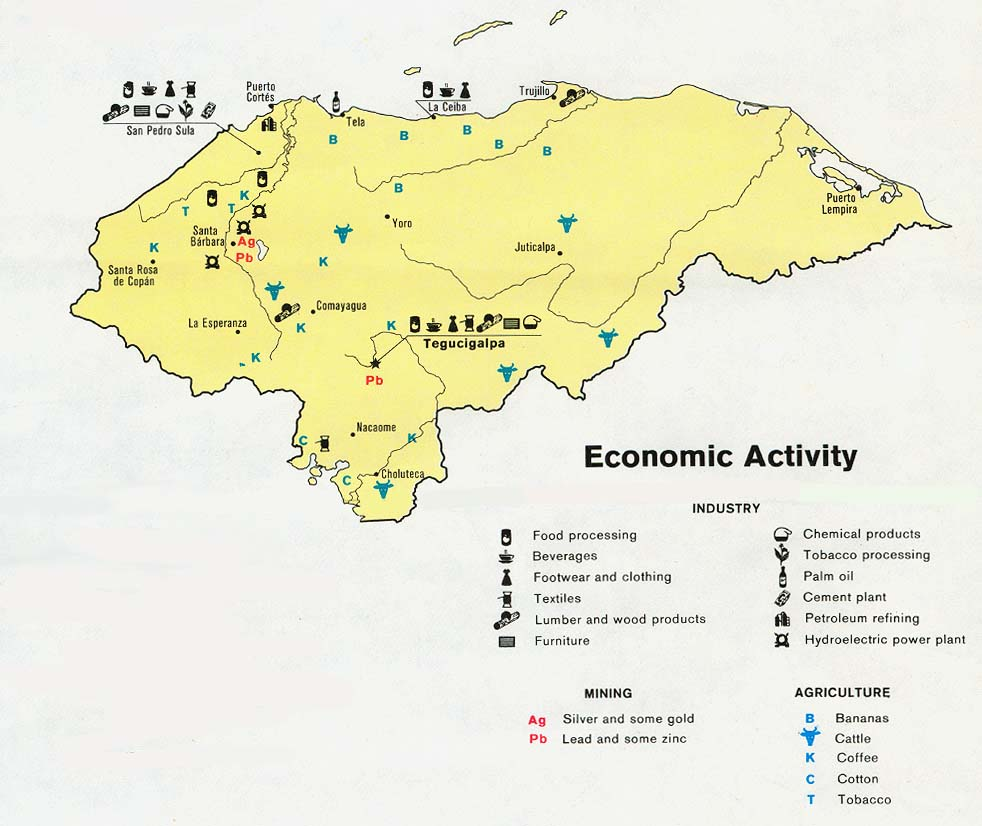
Types of Economic Activity in Honduras

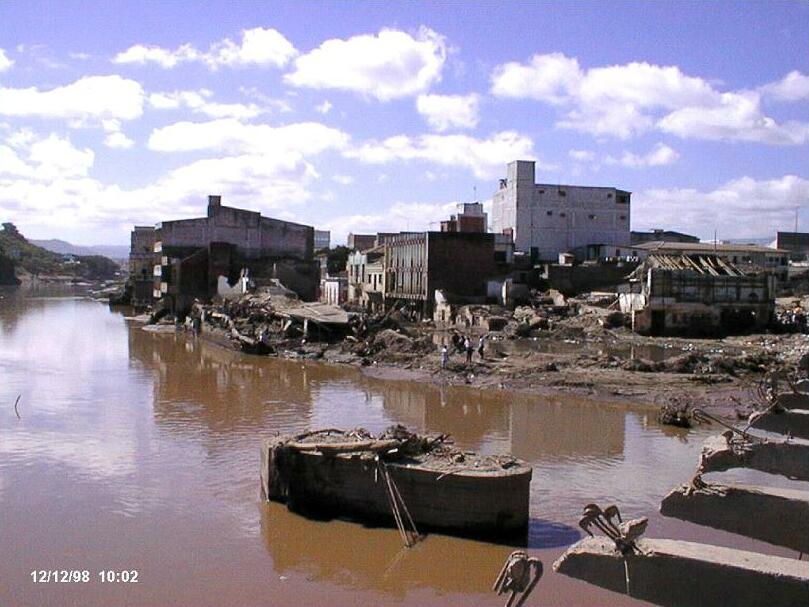
Projects by the World Bank have proved critical in preventing major damage to infrastructure from natural disasters such as Hurricane Mitch, which left Honduras with 90% of its agricultural land completely destroyed in 2012

The World Bank Group is a family of five international organizations that has provided leveraged loans and monetary assistance to the Central American country of Honduras in order to assist with the funding of critical tasks needed to ensure security of Honduran access to financing, expansion of social program coverage, and rural development. The country is the second poorest in Central America and its high poverty rate of 66% in 2016 has prompted an increased focus on the importance of diversification of rural income sources, quality education, and targeted social programs as a way of spurring economic growth.

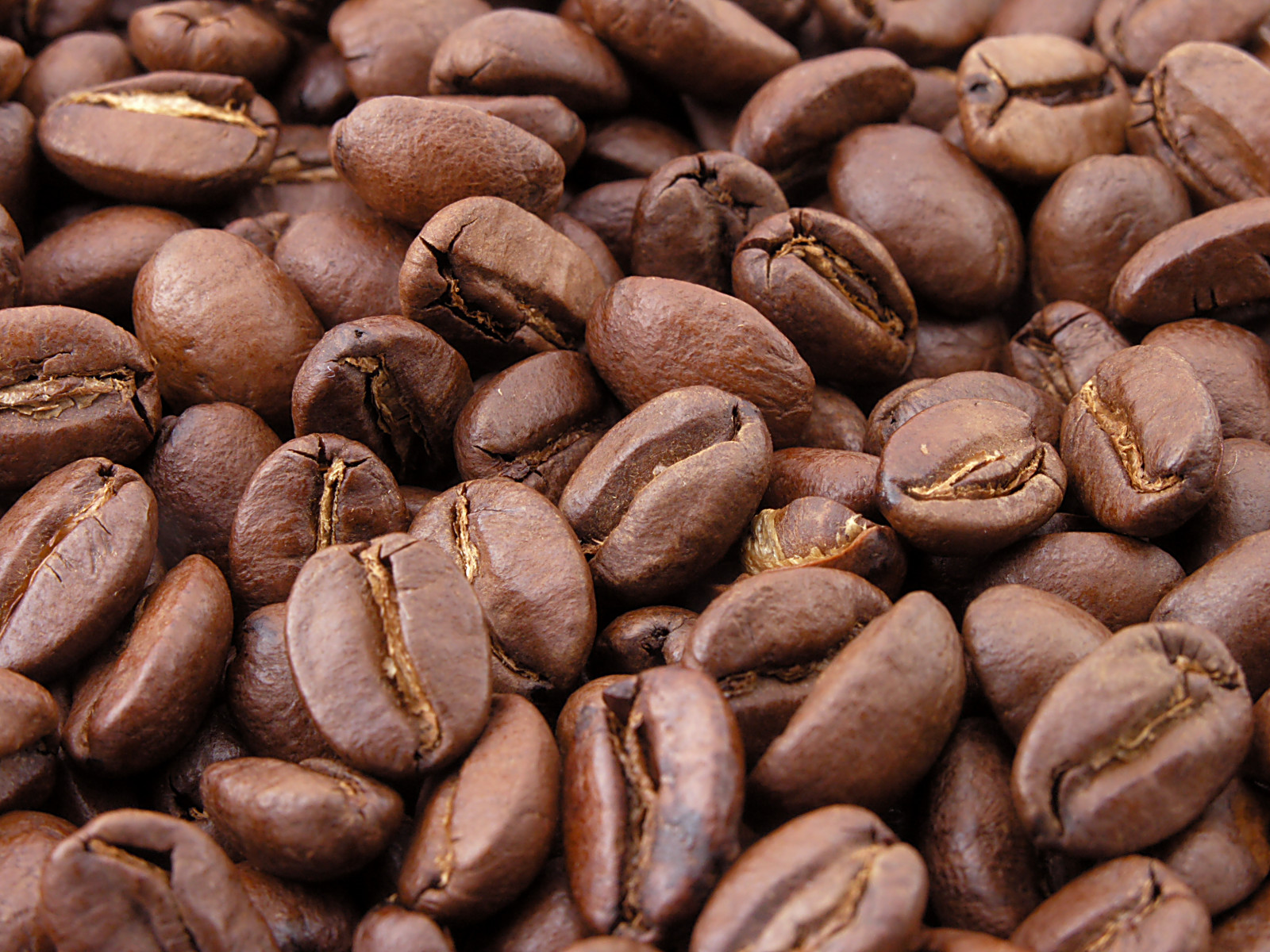
Coffee exports make up a staggering 20% of Honduras' Total GDP. WB efforts in infrastructure and productivity have enabled farmers to grow with confidence and competitive trade in the global coffee market.

Operating with investments from the International Development Association (IDA), the International Finance Corporation (IFC), and the Multilateral Investment Guarantee Agency (MIGA), the World Bank manages an investment portfolio of over $990 Million US dollars in Honduras in its effort to promote the development of the private and public sector through foreign investment and economic activity. Recent efforts by the World Bank in Honduras have included the Country Partnership network (CPF) finalized December 15, 2015 as a joint effort between the World Bank Group and its IDA, MIGA, and IFC subsidiaries, who have contributed US $169 Million, US $327 million, and $494 million to the Honduran portfolio, respectively. The CPF has seven primary objectives that were formed to "promote inclusion, strengthen growth conditions, and reduce vulnerabilities in the country."

== Strategic partnership ==
=== IDA ===
The International Development Association's (IDA) portfolio in Honduras currently holds US $354 million in investments operating through a total nine lending operations spanning a variety of sectors in the region such as public sector management, citizen security, rural development, and social protection. Despite the promising potential that access to $300 has represented for the region, political risk within groundwork by the institution along with problems with implementation logistics have threatened to leave nearly US $100 million in assistance undisbursed with only 5 full-time projects being implemented, including the Improving Public Sector Performance project and the Rural Infrastructure Project, both of which have generally been classified as moderately unsatisfactory in their operation yet nonetheless seen as a positive trend with their relative increase in performance according to IDA standards.

=== IFC ===
Investments by the International Finance Corporation (IFC) in Honduras also include from $639.7 million in commitment to projects targeted toward Honduras' renewable energy sector, the expansion of the financial sector, and bolstering a competitive climate within agricultural business in rural communities. Operating as the second largest portfolio in Central America with over $630 million, Honduras has experienced growth through 29 successful public-private partnerships in infrastructure projects, as well as investments in four large scale renewable energy projects that are intended to help strengthen Honduras' electronic grid and assist in the development of a strong economy backed by a reliable infrastructure. The IFC has received criticism for providing funding to the palm oil company Dinant due to allegations that the company has engaged in lethal attacks against several co-operatives. The institution has also faced criticism over a 2011 $70m investment to Banco Ficohsa, Honduras' largest bank, with critics stating that the money would be indirectly supplied to Dinant. In a December 2013 audit the IFC's ombudsman found that the institution did not perform due diligence when examining the potential social and ecological risks associated with Dinant.

However, in its 2015 report on Honduras, the International Criminal Court stated that "criminal organisations and international drug cartels are deeply involved in local businesses and criminal activities in the region and seem to be involved in most of the alleged crimes in the Bajo Aguán, including unlawful occupations of land and robbery of African palm fruits, in order to retain control of the region and to continue to operate in total impunity."

A class action lawsuit was filed in March 2017 by the NGO EarthRights International on behalf of approximately a dozen anonymous farmers looking for compensation from the World Bank, who they claim “knowingly profiting from the financing of murder” by financing Dinant via the IFC.

In October 2017, the IFC confirmed that Dinant had fully repaid the balance of its outstanding loan and that Dinant had achieved material compliance with IFC’s Performance Standards. The IFC also acknowledged that Dinant had made progress, particularly in implementing the Voluntary Principles on Security and Human Rights (VPSHR) security force protocols.

In November 2017, Dinant defended its former relationship with the World Bank, stating, “The IFC’s loan to Dinant was granted to help us increase production capacity, upgrade our distribution network, enhance the surrounding natural environment, and expand economic opportunities for local communities, particularly in rural areas like the Aguán. Of course, we must continue to improve but, by all these measures and more, the IFC’s loan to Dinant has been a tremendous success. Dinant is now widely recognized as an international benchmark in how to operate a successful business transparently and honestly in one of the most challenging regions in the world.”

=== MIGA ===
Operating through three major projects totaling over $US 326 million, the Multilateral Investment Guarantee, or MIGA has also brought potentially major changes in transport and energy sectors. Just recently, as of September 25, 2015, MIGA committed to $187 million in investment guarantees to support the construction of a major effort to connect San Pedro Sula, currently Honduras' 2nd largest city, and La Ceiba near its coast. Honduras will potentially be able to manage more tourist traffic and support it with another MIGA-backed project granting over $80 million US dollars that will expand Honduras' current power grid capacity from 102 megawatts to 126 megawatts with the implementation of a wind farm and massive photovoltaic, (Solar power) projects.

== Targeted projects ==
Operating to improve inclusion, bolster conditions for growth, and reduce vulnerabilities, the Country Partnership Framework's Areas of Engagement have expanded possibilities within the region. A new, targeted approach through a variety of programs in social protections in labor and medicine, rural competitiveness projects in agriculture, and risk disaster management has created some positive outlook for areas across the region prone to lasting damage from hurricanes and typhoons that threaten local and regional farmlands, roads and disrupt economic activity. Projects like the Rural Competitiveness Project managed by the IDA, the IBRD's Nutrition and Social Protection Project, and the Second Project for Highway Reconstruction and Improvement have helped boost Honduras' economic productivity following its slow recovery from the 2008-2009 global recession. Secured agriculture, access to safe infrastructure, and reliable response capacities of local emergency authorities have sparked regional competitiveness and activity in the local economy. The Rural Competitiveness Project alone has created over 9,000 jobs and is responsible for productive partnerships with local business leaders in agricultural production, such as coffee and fruit, some of Honduras' leading exports upon which the livelihood of a vast percentage of the Honduran citizens depend. On May 18, 2017, the World Bank Board of Directors approved a US$25 million loan in additional financing for the Rural Competitiveness Project, focusing on increased adaptation to climate change which has had a direct impact on food insecurity and poverty rates in the region. Should the implementation of new technologies, an estimated 5,500 new rural housing units, and arrangement of 70 business plans be successful in their targeted goals, programs are set to potentially serve directly to local communities in efforts advancing a vibrant economy backed by a strong infrastructure and thriving agricultural competition.

== COVID 19 and Current Projects ==
=== Covid-19 Impact on GDP ===
In 2020, the Central American state's economy diminished due to the Covid-19 pandemic and Hurricane Eta and Iota. The GDP (Gross Domestic Product) of various Central American states decreased causing a recession, Hondura's GDP decreased by -6.5%. Unemployment rates and inequality throughout the state escalated to 10.7%. Starting March 2020 a significant amount of monthly revenue decreased compared to other Central American states during the pandemic. The World Bank provided emergency programs to prevent GDP and unemployment rates from decreasing during the Covid-19, they were insufficient. Covid-19 has delayed the state agenda which consisted of increase GDP, and lowering inequality and poverty by 2023.

==== World Bank Emergency Response ====
In 2020 an emergency project was created and approved with the purpose of combating the Covid-19 pandemic. The World Bank committed US$20 million in an effort to finance the state. The US$20 million were disbursed to two main areas of the project. One, increase surveillance and diagnostic within the SESAL (Secretariá de Salud) health commission in Honduras. Second, to increase reinforcement for the personnel in the public health sector. Reinforcement as in medical equipment for ICUs as a precaution against the COVID-19 pandemic. The project is set to close on April 30, 2023.

=== Recent Approved Projects ===
==== As of April 16, 2021 there are seven approved projects by the World Bank. ====
===== Additional Financing to the Honduras Covid-19 emergency response project =====
Project ID: P176015

Approved on: April 16, 2021

The status of the project is active with no set closing date with an estimation of US$20 million amount, dedicated to the public administration health sector. The purpose of the project is to help combat Covid-19 by providing adequate training, vaccinations, and supplies.

===== Additional Financing to Social Protection Integration Project =====
Project ID: P175718

Approved on: June 15, 2021

Associated Projects: P152057

The status of the project is active with no set closing date with an estimation of US$70 million amount. The project's purpose is to increase social protection programs for the vulnerable and in need. It will directly benefit 72,000 households throughout the state by financing state programs.

===== Innovation for Rural Competitiveness project - COMRURUAL III =====
Project ID: P174328

Approved on: June 15, 2021

The status of the project is active with a set closing date of June 15, 2027, with an estimation of US$146.10 million amount. The project has several goals, including increasing job opportunities in the agricultural sector and Investments, as well as, acquiring market access and climate aware attitude.

===== Corredor Seco Food security Project Additional Financing =====
Project ID: P177149

Approved date: June 29, 2021

Associated Projects: P148737

The status of the project is active with no set closing date with an estimated cost of US$5.45 million amount with a US$0.00 million commitment amount. The project focuses on the Corredor Seco area of Honduras. 65% of people in this area live below the poverty line with a high percentage of malnutrition the project aims to implement a sustainable strategy for agriculture.

===== Supporting Resilient Water Resources Management and Water Service Project =====
Project ID: P175896

Approved Date: December 13, 2021

The status of the project is active with no set closing date with an estimated cost of US$0.90 million with a US$0.00 million commitment amount. The project targets specific areas to improve water management and resources, as well as, increase investment.

===== Honduras Second Disaster Risk Management Development Policy Credit with a Catastrophe Deferred Drawdown Option (CatDDO) =====
Source:

===== Project ID: P177001 =====
Approved Date: June 16, 2022

The status of the project is active with a set closing date of June 30, 2025, with a commitment amount of US$110.00 million. The objective is to broaden financial, policy, and regulatory institutions' frameworks to effectively act in disasters. To solidify state institutions to create an effective response during natural disasters and disease outbreaks.

===== Restoring Essential Services For Health and Advancing Preparedness for Emergency Project =====
Project ID: P176532

Approved Date: June 16, 2022

The status of the project is active with a set closing date of November 30, 2028, with a commitment amount of US$60.00 million. The purpose of the project is to improve health services and emergency preparedness. Areas of concentration are child health and reproductive services.

== See also ==
- COVID-19 pandemic in Honduras
- Hurricane Eta
