= Corruption in Honduras =

Corruption in Honduras is a serious problem, affecting various aspects of governance and the Honduran society. Out of the 182 nations listed in the Transparency International’s 2025 Corruption Perceptions Index, it ranked 157th, making it one of the lowest performing countries in the Americas. It only ranked better than Haiti, Nicaragua, and Venezuela. Corruption is one of the factors, along with drug-related crimes and poverty, that reinforce and perpetuate the fragility of the rule of law in the country.

== Background ==
In Honduras corruption has deep historical roots and is, thus, entrenched in society. It is no longer characterized by the iniquitous doings of individual perpetrators. Throughout the years, operating system of kleptocratic networks emerged, dominating the country’s political, social, and economic spheres. These networks have assumed cross-sectoral and transnational forms. Corruption today is committed not only for individual gain but at a scale that resembles a bureaucracy, benefitting a large swathe of members.

One of the most serious types of corruption in Honduras involves the misappropriation of funds meant for the delivery of essential public services. Public funds lost to corruption in 2018 amounted to more than $2 billion, constituting 12.5% of the Honduran GDP. Examples of notable cases include the $300-million embezzlement case in the public health care system. The National Anti-Corruption Council found that from 2014 to 2016, a civil society organization diverted $300 million from the public health system to private businesses. The fund was then used to finance political campaigns such as Hernandez’ 2013 presidential campaign.

In 2019, 176 politicians and a string of non-governmental organizations (NGOs) were also prosecuted for embezzlement. It involved a corrupt network of nonprofits that obtained more than $70 million from the public coffers over the past decade. Again, several of these organizations funneled the funds to politicians and to campaigns that were launched to influence the outcome of Honduran elections.

By October 2023, prosecutors indicted two former conservative presidents for diverting $12 million of public funds to bankroll their political campaigns. These were Juan Orlando Hernandez and his predecessor Porfirio Lobo. The former was also extradited to the United States in 2022 due to drug trafficking charges. Like the earlier case of embezzlement scandal, this case also involved a network of corruption, which was constituted by organizations formed between 2010 and 2013. Lobo's wife, the former first lady Rosa Elena Bonilla, was convicted in 2019 for embezzling around $600,000 during the course of her husband's term. The corruption charges against her were initially lodged by the Organization of American States’ anti-corruption mission.

== Narco state ==
The growth in power and influence of criminal organizations, particularly, drug traffickers, contribute to the persistence of systemic corruption in Honduras. The country is part of the primary transit route of drugs from South America bound for sale in the U.S. market. It is already described as a critical narco-state since almost all the important institutions of governance work in favor of the drug trade. As a severely compromised state, this corruption tied to drugs exists not only at the highest levels of the police, judicial system, and national government but also in civil society, which is either co-opted or cowed by the influence of the drug cartels. The situation became critical in the 2000s as Mexico started cracking down on its drug cartels. Drug traffickers in search of an alternative overland route found in Honduras a weak and pliant government.

By 2012, the U.S. Department of State reported that “more than 80 percent of the primary flow of the cocaine trafficked to the United States first transited through the Central American corridor” and that 87 percent of cocaine smuggling flights that depart in South America first land in Honduras. Around this period, it is estimated that the total value of the drug trade is equivalent to 13 percent of the Honduran GDP or 2/3 of the total budget allocated by the government for crime prevention.

The most prominent bribery involved Juan Antonio Hernandez, who was convicted in the U.S. for drug trafficking in October 2019. He was the brother of President Hernandez and was a previous member of the Honduran legislature. It was revealed that he received bribes from Mexican, Colombian, and Honduran drug cartels.

== Impact ==
A UN-backed international commission on human rights and legal reforms found that corruption in Honduras undermines human rights. This is demonstrated in a study by the Human Rights Watch evaluating the judicial files of corruption investigations. It found that corruption is linked to human rights abuses. The systemic corruption in the country has led to the inability of the government to fund and support public health, education, clean water, housing, and other rights.

Corruption also has an adverse impact on the private sector as it results in an increase of the cost of investment due to red tape and increased uncertainty on the part of private firms. In addition, the misappropriation of funds not only reduces the efficiency of government spending but it also increases public mistrust of its revenue collection, which leads to tax evasion.

== Anti-corruption efforts ==
There is a view that anti-corruption reform in Honduras has very little chance of success since corrupt interests are scaled across all levels of authority. This means that any initiative launched to root out corruption is bound to hit a wall of resistance. There are, however, several public and private attempts to address the Honduran culture of corruption. An example is the Justice, Human Rights, and Security Strengthening Activity (Unidos por la Justicia), which is a USAID-funded program established to facilitate institutional reform, access to justice and civil society, increase policing, and women empowerment, among others.

President Xiomara Castro also created the International Commission against Corruption and Impunity (Comision Internacional contra la Corrupcion e Impunidad en Honduras). This commission, which was established through a memorandum with the United Nations, aimed to learn from past experiences and make lasting progress in addressing corruption in the country. The creation of the commission is a significant development in solving the corruption problem because it had investigative powers. Two of the high-profile cases it handled were the murder of the environmental and human rights activist, Bertha Caceres, and the 2009 assassination of Aristides Gonzales, the Honduran anti-drug czar. In 2020, however, Honduran President Juan Orlando Hernandez allowed the mandate of this commission to expire, setting back its capability to help institutions deter and investigate high-level corruption.

Honduras also instituted police reform. Key components of this initiative include training and education of the police. The average salary of the uniformed personnel was also increased. These reforms complemented a depuration process, which aimed to weed out corrupt officers. In 2016, a total of 100 police officers were terminated and this number included 2 police directors and 27 commissioners.

=== Legal barriers ===
There are also legal barriers that prevent Honduras from addressing corruption. This is demonstrated in the case of the new penal code passed in June 2020. The new law reduced punishments for corruption and drug trafficking-related crimes. Those who are convicted of corruption-related crimes can also have their sentences reduced if they repay their stolen funds. Fourteen government officials convicted of graft were acquitted because of the new code.

=== International Rankings ===
Transparency International's 2025 Corruption Perceptions Index gave Honduras a score of 22 on a scale from 0 ("highly corrupt") to 100 ("very clean"). When ranked by score, Honduras ranked 157th among the 182 countries in the Index, where the country ranked first is perceived to have the most honest public sector. For comparison with regional scores, the best score among the countries of the Americas (Note: Argentina, Bahamas, Barbados, Belize, Bolivia, Brazil, Canada, Chile, Colombia, Costa Rica, Cuba, Dominica, Dominican Republic, Ecuador, El Salvador, Grenada, Guatemala, Guyana, Haiti, Honduras, Jamaica, Mexico, Nicaragua, Panama, Paraguay, Peru, Saint Lucia, Saint Vincent and the Grenadines, Suriname, Trinidad and Tobago, United States of America, Uruguay, Venezuela) was 75, the average score was 42 and the worst score was 10. For comparison with worldwide scores, the best score was 89 (ranked 1), the average score was 42, and the worst score was 9 (ranked 181, in a two-way tie).
