= 2009 Heineken Cup final =

2009 Heineken Cup Final
- Match programme cover
- Event: 2008–09 Heineken Cup
Leicester Tigers	Leinster
(England)	(Ireland)
16	19
- Date: 23 May 2009
- Venue: Murrayfield Stadium, Edinburgh
- Man of the Match: Rocky Elsom (Leinster)
- Referee: Nigel Owens (Wales)
- Attendance: 66,523

The 2009 Heineken Cup Final was the final match of the 2008–09 Heineken Cup, the 14th season of Europe's top club rugby union competition. The match was played on 23 May 2009 at Murrayfield Stadium in Edinburgh; this was the second time that the Heineken Cup final had been held at Murrayfield after the 2005 final, when Toulouse beat Stade Français 18–12 after extra time.

The match was contested by Leicester Tigers of England and Leinster of Ireland. While Leinster were making their first appearance in the Heineken Cup final, Leicester were playing in their fifth, having won the competition twice, though not since 2002; they did, however, finish as runners-up in 2007.

Leinster won the match 19–16; Leinster took the lead via an early drop goal from Brian O'Driscoll, only for Julien Dupuy to equalise with a penalty a couple of minutes later. Leinster then moved 9–3 ahead with a drop goal from the halfway line and a penalty from Johnny Sexton. However, after Stan Wright was sin-binned on the half-hour mark for an off-the-ball challenge on Sam Vesty, Leicester reduced the deficit to three points with another Dupuy penalty, before taking a 13–9 half-time lead via a converted try from Ben Woods. Dupuy increased Leicester's lead to seven points with a third penalty goal just after the interval, but a converted try from Jamie Heaslip brought the teams level with half an hour left to play. Then, with ten minutes left on the clock, Sexton squeezed a penalty inside the right-hand upright to win the match for Leinster.

== Background ==
Murrayfield Stadium was chosen as the venue for the 2009 Heineken Cup Final on 19 May 2008. The 2009 final was the second Heineken Cup final to be hosted by the 67,778-capacity stadium, following the 2005 final, when Toulouse beat Stade Français 18–12 after extra time in front of 51,000 spectators.

The 2009 final was Leinster's first Heineken Cup final, although they had reached the semi-final stage on three other occasions: in 1995–96, 2002–03 and 2005–06, when they were knocked out by Cardiff RFC, Perpignan and Munster respectively. Leicester, however, had reached the final on four other occasions: 1997, 2001, 2002 and 2007; they won the competition in 2001 and 2002, beating Stade Français and Munster, but lost out to Brive in 1997 and London Wasps in 2007.

Nigel Owens of Wales was named as the match referee for the 2009 final on 13 May 2009, making him the second official to referee consecutive Heineken Cup finals after England's Chris White. Frenchman Christophe Berdos was appointed as fourth official.

== Route to the final ==
=== Leicester Tigers ===
For the pool stage draw, the 24 entrants were divided up into four tiers based on their European Rugby Club ranking; each group would consist of one team from each tier, and no country could have more than one team in the same group – with the exception of France, which would have two teams in one group. Leinster was placed in Tier 2, which would mean that they would avoid being drawn with teams like Gloucester, Sale Sharks and the Scarlets, but they could still be drawn with Toulouse, Stade Français, the Ospreys and the Cardiff Blues. They ended up being drawn in Pool 2 alongside London Wasps, Castres and Edinburgh.

Based on their European Club Rugby ranking, Leicester Tigers were placed in Tier 1 for the pool stage draw, meaning that they would avoid being drawn with Toulouse, Stade Français and holders Munster. They were eventually drawn into Pool 3 with Perpignan, the Ospreys and Benetton Treviso.

Four wins in their first five matches meant that Leicester went into their final pool match against the Ospreys needing only a point to reach the knockout stage. Within 15 minutes of the match kicking off, they were already 6–3 down; the score remained that way until half-time, after which the two teams continued to trade penalties, resulting in a final score of 15–9 to the Ospreys. The six-point margin gave the Tigers the losing bonus point they needed and they qualified for the quarter-finals as pool winners. Their pool record meant that they were given the fourth seed for the quarter-finals, meaning that they would face a home match against the fifth seeds, Bath.

Leicester went into the quarter-finals as the joint-top try scorers from the pool stage, while Bath had the second-lowest number of tries. Nevertheless, it was Bath substitute Shaun Berne who scored the first try of the quarter-final, going 7–6 up after Sam Vesty had scored two penalties in the first quarter of the game. After half-time, the two teams traded penalties before Joe Maddock crossed for Bath's second try in the 64th minute. Vesty levelled the scores at 15–15 soon after, but just as the match looked like it was heading to extra time, Leicester's replacement scrum-half Julien Dupuy feinted to pass back to Vesty in the pocket for a match-winning drop goal before scurrying through a gap at the base of the ruck on the edge of Bath's 22-metre line to score a try. Leicester's 20–15 win secured them a place in the semi-finals, where they would play the Cardiff Blues, who had beaten Toulouse 9–6 earlier that day.

The Blues were the only team to come through the pool stage unbeaten and, going into the quarter-finals, they were the joint-top try scorers in the competition, along with Leicester themselves. Ben Blair gave Cardiff the lead with a penalty before the 15-minute mark, but Leicester responded with a converted try from Scott Hamilton and a Julien Dupuy penalty to take the score to 10–3. Cardiff hit back with three penalties of their own before Dupuy slotted over to give Leicester a 13–12 half-time lead. After half-time, Leicester increased their lead with a converted try from Geordan Murphy and two more penalties from Dupuy; however, only a few minutes later, the Tigers were hit with two quick-fire sin-binnings, and the Blues took full advantage by scoring two converted tries from Jamie Roberts and Tom James to tie the scores at 26–26 and send the game into extra time. Aside from two missed drop goal attempts from Johne Murphy and Aaron Mauger, extra time was largely uneventful and the match went to the first penalty shootout in Heineken Cup history. The first seven kicks in the shootout were all successful, giving Cardiff a 4–3 lead before Johne Murphy stepped up; however, the Irish winger missed the target, giving Tom James a chance to win the shootout for the Blues, only for the Welshman to miss his kick, allowing Scott Hamilton to convert and take the shootout to sudden death. Both teams successfully converted two more kicks before Martyn Williams wildly hooked his attempt wide and Jordan Crane slotted over to send Leicester into the final.

=== Leinster ===
Leinster won four of their pool stage matches, but a Matchday 5 defeat to Wasps meant that they had to equal or better the London side's result on the final matchday to be guaranteed a place in the knockout stage as group winners. In the end, Leinster's 12–3 win over Edinburgh was sufficient as Wasps were defeated in Castres and Leinster qualified as the sixth seeds for the quarter-finals, meaning that they would have to play away to third seeds Harlequins in the quarter-finals.

Leinster's quarter-final against Harlequins was the last of the quarter-finals to be played, and also the lowest-scoring: Harlequins responded to two first-half penalties from Felipe Contepomi with a 65th-minute try from Mike Brown; Chris Malone had the chance to give Harlequins the lead, but his conversion attempt went wide of the far post. Brown also missed with a long-range penalty, while an injured Nick Evans, who had come on as a blood replacement under dubious circumstances, sent a last-minute drop goal attempt wide to give Leinster a 6–5 win.

The draw for the semi-finals was also made in January 2009, with the winners of Leinster's quarter-final due to play against either Munster or the Ospreys. Munster came through their quarter-final comfortably, beating the Ospreys 43–9 to set up an all-Irish semi-final. As Heineken Cup holders and newly crowned champions of the Celtic League, Munster went into the game as favourites, but Leinster drew first blood with an early drop goal from fly-half Felipe Contepomi. Ronan O'Gara equalised with a penalty shortly after. Several minutes later, Leinster suffered a major blow when Contepomi went down with what proved to be a cruciate ligament injury. A penalty from Contepomi's replacement, Johnny Sexton, and an unconverted try from Gordon D'Arcy gave Leinster an 11–3 lead; a second penalty from O'Gara reduced Leinster's half-time lead to 11–6. Another try for Leinster, this time from Luke Fitzgerald, just after the interval put them two scores ahead, before Brian O'Driscoll intercepted a pass from Ronan O'Gara to score under the posts and round off a 25–6 win for Leinster. The match marked the first time that a club rugby match had been played at Croke Park, and the 82,208 attendance for the match set a new world record in club Rugby Union.

== Match ==
Leinster beat Leicester 19–16. They led Leicester 9–3 within 30 minutes following drop goals by Brian O'Driscoll and Johnny Sexton and a penalty by Sexton. They then had Stan Wright sin-binned, with Leicester moving into a 13–9 lead at half-time thanks to a Ben Woods try. Leinster's Jamie Heaslip scored a try to level the scores in the second half, with Sexton scoring another penalty to win the match ten minutes before the end.

=== Match details ===
23 May 2009
17:00 BST

Leicester Tigers (England)	16–19	(Ireland) Leinster
Try: Woods 38' c Con: Dupuy (1/1); Pen: Dupuy (3/3) 8', 33', 42'	Report	Try: Heaslip 49' c Con: Sexton (1/1); Pen: Sexton (2/3) 24', 70'; Drop: O'Driscoll (1/1) 5'; Sexton (1/1) 17'

Murrayfield Stadium, Edinburgh
Attendance: 66,523
Referee: Nigel Owens (Wales)

Team details

Leicester Tigers
Leinster

FB	15	(Ireland) Geordan Murphy (c)
RW	14	(New Zealand) Scott Hamilton
OC	13	(England) Ayoola Erinle
IC	12	(England) Dan Hipkiss
LW	11	(Samoa) Alesana Tuilagi
FH	10	(England) Sam Vesty
SH	9	(France) Julien Dupuy
N8	8	(England) Jordan Crane
OF	7	(England) Ben Woods
BF	6	(New Zealand) Craig Newby
RL	5	(England) Ben Kay
LL	4	(England) Tom Croft
TP	3	(Italy) Martin Castrogiovanni
HK	2	(England) George Chuter
LP	1	(Argentina) Marcos Ayerza
Substitutions:
HK	16	(France) Benjamin Kayser
PR	17	(England) Julian White
LK	18	(England) Louis Deacon
FL	19	(England) Lewis Moody
SH	20	(England) Harry Ellis
CE	21	(England) Ollie Smith
FH	22	(Ireland) Johne Murphy
Coach:
(England) Richard Cockerill

FB	15	(Fiji) Isa Nacewa
RW	14	(Ireland) Shane Horgan
OC	13	(Ireland) Brian O'Driscoll
IC	12	(Ireland) Gordon D'Arcy
LW	11	(Ireland) Luke Fitzgerald
FH	10	(Ireland) Johnny Sexton
SH	9	(Australia) Chris Whitaker
N8	8	(Ireland) Jamie Heaslip
OF	7	(Ireland) Shane Jennings
BF	6	(Australia) Rocky Elsom
RL	5	(Ireland) Malcolm O'Kelly
LL	4	(Ireland) Leo Cullen (c)
TP	3	(Cook Islands) Stan Wright
HK	2	(Ireland) Bernard Jackman
LP	1	(Ireland) Cian Healy
Substitutions:
HK	16	(Ireland) John Fogarty
PR	17	(Ireland) Ronan McCormack
LK	18	(Ireland) Devin Toner
FL	19	(Ireland) Seán O'Brien
SH	20	(Ireland) Simon Keogh
FB	21	(Ireland) Rob Kearney
FB	22	(Ireland) Girvan Dempsey
Coach:
(Australia) Michael Cheika

== Reaction ==
Ireland's Taoiseach Brian Cowen attended the match and said he was "absolutely delighted" and that it was a "real pleasure" to be present at a "hugely exciting match". He said it had been part of "a golden year" for the sport in Ireland.

John Gormley, leader of the Irish Green Party, said the team deserved "the country's fullest praise and admiration" for lifting themselves "to the very heights of the international game".

The British media reported in the aftermath that "everything Irish rugby touches at the moment turns to gleaming silver".

The Leinster team were welcomed back at a special ceremony in their regular home ground, the RDS Arena, on 24 May 2009. Spectators did not have to pay to attend this celebration, which also featured live music and family activities.

Leicester were reported to have taken "their considerable disappointment on the chin".

== See also ==
- 2008–09 Heineken Cup
