= Richard Blaze =

English rugby union footballer

- Born: Richard James Blaze; 19 April 1985 (age 41) Birmingham, England
- Height: 6 ft 7 in (2.01 m)
- Weight: 18 st 8 lb (118kg)
- School: King’s Norton Boys’ School; Birmingham & Bishop Challoner School
- Occupation: Rugby Union Coach

Rugby union career
- Position: Lock
- Current team: Leicester Tigers Rugby Club
Senior career
Years	Team	Apps	(Points)
2003–2004	Moseley		
2004–2007	Worcester Warriors	46	(25)
2007–2010	Leicester Tigers	28	(22)
International career
Years	Team	Apps	(Points)
2007–2009	England Saxons	10	(5)

Richard Blaze (born 19 April 1985 in Birmingham, England) is an English rugby union forwards coach and former player who played Lock for Leicester Tigers and Worcester Warriors. Due to his early retirement from the game, Blaze is widely known as one of the youngest but most experienced coaches in premiership rugby.

== Youth ==
Richard Blaze, originally a basketball player for the Midlands, was a late comer to the game of rugby. Spotted by Mosley and North Midlands development coaches, he rapidly progressed through county and divisional level rugby under 18s. He was a product of the Worcester Warriors academy, alongside Dylan Hartley and Tom Wood.

== Playing career ==
Blaze made his premiership debut in April 2005 for Worcester Warrior against Newcastle and due to his "enforcer" style presence was one of the first players from Worcester academy to gain a professional contract.

In 2007, he signed for Leicester Tigers. In the years that followed Leicester Tigers won two Premiership titles. In the 2009 Premiership final Leicester beat London Irish 10–9, and Tigers retained their title the following year as they defeated Saracens 33–27. After an historic placing kicking competition decided the 2009 Heineken cup semi-final, Leicester lost the 2009 Heineken Cup Final to Irish province Leinster.

== International career ==
Blaze represented England thirty-one times at age group level. Gaining four Under 18s caps in 2003 and seven under 19s caps 2004. He gained further twenty under 21s caps across 2005-6: Playing all 21 games over two seasons. This included age group Grand Slam and successful U21 Grand Slam campaign.

Blaze represented England Saxons at the 2007 Churchill Cup and 2008 Churchill Cup.

Blaze, known for his exceptional work at the line out, was called up to Martin Johnson's England squad for the 2009 Autumn Internationals.

Blaze missed much of 2009–10 season due to a foot injury. After having been picked for England's Elite Squad as a replacement for Simon Shaw, Blaze retired on 21 October 2010 after suffering a foot injury.

== Coaching ==
Blaze started his coaching career at Leicester Tigers in 2010, as an assistant Forwards Coach to the first team and Head Coach to seconds team. Alongside Richard Cockerill, Matt O'Connor and Paul Burke. As a coaching team they went on to win two English Championships, in 2010 season and again in 2013. Tigers also reached Premiership Finals in 2011 and 2012.

In 2015 Blaze was appointed First Team Forwards coach, under Head coaches Richard Cockerill and Aaron Mauger.

In 2017 Blaze wanted explore new challenges across all age groups of the sport and was quickly made academy coach for Leicester Tigers and England Under 20s Forward Coach. As an academy coach Blaze was a part of the coaching team at Leicester Tigers that coached the academy to their first championship and are currently the National Academy Champions.

As England Under 20s Forwards Coach Blaze, coached the side though an Under-20 Six Nations and Under-20 Rugby World Cup. Making into the Final of the World Cup, narrowly missing out to France in the final, in France.

Richard Blaze whilst at RFU moved to the Forwards and Defence Coach for the England Women's First Team. After completing a successful autumn international period, they had gone on to become grand slam champions of 2019.

Whilst at the RFU Richard appointed by Wasps Rugby Football Club as their forwards coach for the 2020 season. This first Season saw them in the final of the English Premiership.
