= Stan Wright (rugby union) =

Cook Islands international rugby union player (born 1978)

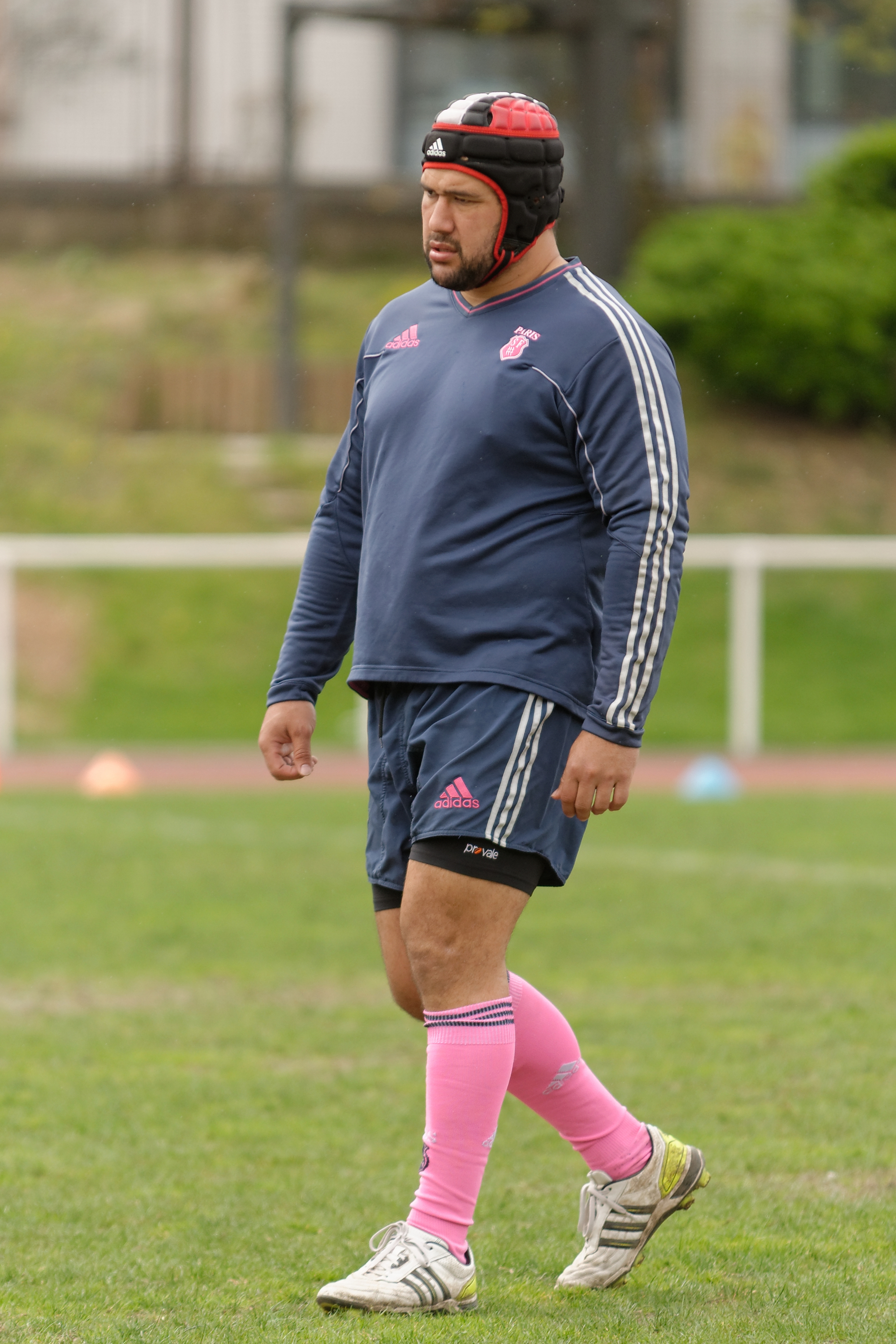
- Wright in 2013
- Born: Stanley Wright; 29 September 1978 (age 48) Rarotonga, Cook Islands
- Height: 1.87 m (6 ft 1 1/2 in)
- Weight: 131 kg (20 st 9 lb; 289 lb)
- School: Tereora College
- Notable relative: Poila Wright (Mama Tuki)

Rugby union career
- Position: Prop
- Current team: Retired
Youth career
- Whangarei Marist, Auckland Marist
Senior career
Years	Team	Apps	(Points)
1999–2000	Ystradgynlais	0	(0)
2000–2006	Northland	61	(5)
2006	Blues	0	(0)
2006–2011	Leinster	94	(5)
2011–2013	Stade Français	57	(0)
2013–2015	RC Narbonne	54	(25)
2015–2016	Oyonnax	14	(0)
- Correct as of 30 April 2020
International career
Years	Team	Apps	(Points)
	Cook Islands	9	(9)

Stan Wright (born 29 September 1978) is a retired Cook Islands international rugby union player, who played in the prop position for Leinster, Blues and Stade Français.

== Playing career ==
Stan's played for clubs such as the Marist Club in Whangārei, and for Northland in the Air New Zealand Cup where he played alongside Fijian flyer, Rupeni Caucaunibuca. He was also part of the Auckland Blues squad for the 2006 Super 14 season, however, he was forced to withdraw due to injury.

Wright joined Irish side Leinster in December 2006 as an injury replacement for Will Green, after he was recommended to the club by Auckland scrum coach Mike Casey, who was a friend of the then Leinster forwards coach, Mike Brewer. Wright proved himself to be a successful scrummager and eventually nailed himself down as the first choice prop for the club.

The following season, Stanley helped Leinster to their 2nd Magners League title win, with a number of impressive performances in the front row, he was rewarded for this by being selected in the '07/08 League Dream Team', along with six other players from Leinster. Wright won the IRUPA Sports 'Unsung Hero' award for his performances in the 2008-09 Magners League season.

Stanley won the 2009 and 2011 Heineken Cup with Leinster, before moving on to French side Stade Français. He was extremely popular with the Leinster supporters and he earned the nickname 'Cookie Monster' because of his home nation, the Cook Islands.

== Coaching career ==
Stan was appointed Forwards coach for the amateur Irish Rugby team, Suttonians RFC, for the 2009–2010 season.

In 2016, Stanley was hired as coach of the under 20's Cook Islands Rugby team.

== Personal life ==
Stan's mother, Poila Wright (Mama Tuki) was awarded an OBE in 2007.

In 2011, Stan was the highest paid athlete from the Cook Islands.

== Honours ==
=== Cups ===
- Pro12 (Note: Formerly known as Celtic League / Magners League)
  - 2008
- European Rugby Champions Cup (Note: Formerly known as Heineken European Cup)
  - 2009
  - 2011

=== Personal Honours ===
- Magners League Dream Team for the 07–08 season.
