= Interchange (Australian rules football) =

Team position in Australian rules football

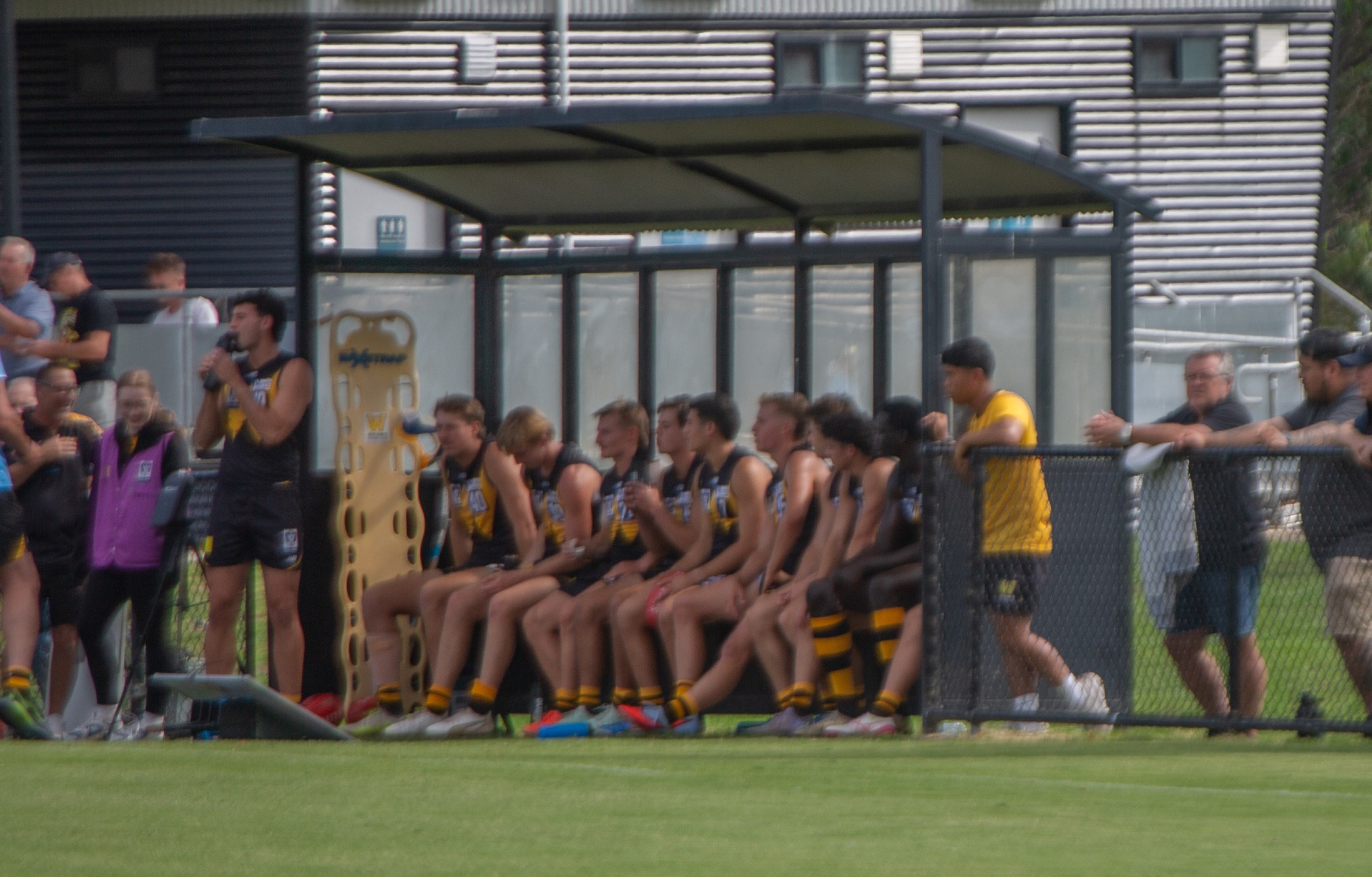
Werribee's interchange bench during a practice match against Tasmania in 2026

Interchange (also referred to as the interchange bench or colloquially the bench) is a team position in Australian rules football, consisting of players who are part of the selected team but are not currently on the field of play.

== Interchange numbers ==
=== AFL ===
As of the 2026 season, at Australian Football League (AFL) level, each team is permitted five interchange players, and a maximum of seventy-five total player interchanges during a game; players have no limit to the number of times they may individually be changed, and an interchange can occur at any time during the game, including during gameplay.

The players named on the interchange bench, must be the interchange players who start on the bench, however they may be substituted immediately if the coach wishes.

=== Other leagues ===
Interchange rules are not uniform across all leagues. In the major state leagues, as of 2016, following interchange numbers are permitted:

- South Australian National Football League: three interchange players, with a maximum of fifty rotations per team per game.
- Victorian Football League: five interchange players.

In AFL Women's, in which each side has 16 players on the field instead of the 18 of the men's game, five interchange players are allowed, with a limit 60 rotations per game as of 2023. Prior to 2023, there was no limit on the number of rotations a team could make per game. The AFL, which operates the women's league, initially decided not to impose a limit on the number of rotations, as that league was then contested during the men's AFL offseason in the southern summer. The change to an interchange limit took place after AFLW transitioned to a winter season.

Representative teams (such as State of Origin teams), practice and exhibition matches often feature an extended interchange bench of up to six or eight players.

=== Substitutes ===
At different times during the history of the sport, there have been substitute players (also known as reserves) serving a function distinct from interchange players. A player who begins the game as a substitute may take no part in the game until he is substituted for another player, and the player substituted out permanently leaves the field.

The substitute rule was resisted for many years, with the prevailing view in the 1910s and 1920s being that a team should be permitted only to substitute a player in the event of an injury, but that there was no practical way to rule against a team making a tactical substitution. A single substitute, known as the nineteenth man, was finally introduced by the Australian National Football Council for the 1930 season, with no restrictions on whether the substitution be used for injury or tactical reasons. A second substitute, the twentieth man, was introduced in 1946, before the substitutes were replaced by interchange in the 1970s. In the AFL since 2011, a hybrid interchange–substitution arrangement has often existed. Between 2011 and 2015, there were three interchange players and one substitute; under those rules, the substitute was required to wear a green vest until activated, and the player substituted out of the game donned a red vest. There were no substitutes between 2016 and 2020. A true medical substitute was introduced in 2021, which for the first time placed a formal restriction on using the substitute for medical reasons only; except with permission from the AFL Medical Officer, a player substituted off for the medical substitute was ineligible to play again until at least twelve days later; this rule remained in place only through 2021 and 2022, before the position reverted to a general substitute available to be used for tactical or medical reasons from 2023 until 2025; it was removed, with an extra standard interchange position added, from 2026.

== Interchange protocol ==
In front of the interchange benches is the interchange area (sometimes called the interchange gate), which is a 15-metre stretch of the boundary line, roughly centred between the two teams' benches, through which all players must enter and exit the ground when being interchanged. It is marked on the boundary line with two short lines, perpendicular to the boundary, and sometimes with a slanted end. A player who interchanges outside of this area is not permitted to return for the rest of the game.

Where a player leaves the ground on a stretcher, he is permitted to take the most direct route to the changerooms for medical treatment, and is still permitted to return later in the game; however, where he leaves on a stretcher, the player must wait for 20 minutes of playing time (the length of one regulation quarter) before returning. If a stretcher is brought onto the ground but the player ultimately does not need to use it, he must still wait for 20 minutes before returning.

Due to new AFL concussion rules, effective from 2011 onwards, any player suspected of suffering a concussion must come off the ground and undergo a concussion test; if found to be concussed, he is not allowed to return to the field for the remainder of the game.

A player may be forced to make an interchange by the umpire under the blood rule. If an umpire sees a player bleeding, he will call time-on at the next appropriate time, stopping play until the player has left the field and been replaced.

Where the league has a provision to do so, an interchange steward is provided to monitor interchanges.

== Policing interchanges ==
=== Headcount ===
The primary means for controlling interchanges in most leagues (but not in the AFL) is via a headcount, currently detailed in Law 5.5 of the game. To initiate this procedure, a team captain must request a headcount from the umpire. The umpire, at the opportunity, will call time on, and all players from both teams line will line-up in the centre of the ground to be counted by the umpires.

If either team has more players on the ground than it should, the general rule, according to the 2019 Laws of the Game, is that any points the team had scored up to that point during the quarter of the headcount are deducted from the score and a free kick and 50-metre penalty are paid to the opposing captain from the centre of the ground or the spot of the ball. The league may impose additional sanctions, including reversal of a match result, as appropriate. Leagues will not necessarily deduct scores during the match; in some cases, the quarter's progress score at the time of the headcount is recorded, and league officials meet after the game to assess whether or not to retrospectively cancel that score. Provisions also exist in the rules for a league to review, identify and impose a penalty (including reversal of the match result) for having too many players on the ground in a post-match video review, without a headcount having been executed during the match.

If both teams have the correct number of players, a free kick and 50-metre penalty are paid against the captain who initiated the headcount; that captain may also be reported for time-wasting and ordered off (should the rules of the league permit) if the umpire believes the captain's primary reason for calling the headcount was to waste time.

Up until the 2018 Laws of the Game, the penalty for having too many players on the ground was cancellation of the team's entire score at the time of the headcount rather than just the score in the quarter of the headcount, and there was no formal allowance for a post-match review and reversal of the result if no headcount had occurred. This immense penalty, which predated the interchange bench or even reserve players, was long known to be one of the great curiosities in the game's laws, and was seen so rarely that decades would usually pass without a league seeing it invoked. The rules were modernized at the end of 2018 after two high-profile incidents which, by incredible coincidence, affected separate state league finals on the exact same day: the SANFL preliminary final, when the league had no recourse to change the result of a game won by a North Adelaide team which fielded 19 men for several crucial final-quarter minutes without a headcount; and the NEAFL grand final (described below) when premier Southport was caught with 19 men on the field in a headcount in the opening seconds of the final quarter. In recent years, the majority of incidents of extra players on the field have been an error by a player who was meant to go to the bench after an interval, hence the shift in rules from cancelling the team's entire score to just cancelling the score for that quarter, but with the provision for further penalty as appropriate.

==== Famous headcounts ====
Perhaps the most famous headcount request occurred in the SANFL in Round 15, 1975. West Torrens' champion Fred Bills, playing the last of his 313 league games (having announced his retirement earlier that week) entered the field of play before John Cassin, who was injured and lying on a stretcher, had left it. This prompted West Adelaide, trailing 11.7 (73) to 12.10 (82) in the final quarter, to request a headcount. West Torrens players ran for the boundary line, while West Adelaide players wrestled with them to keep them in bounds; in the chaos, one player, identified in the match report published in The Advertiser as Norm Dare,^{Note 1} managed to leap the fence and hide under a supporter's coat to avoid detection from the umpire. Ultimately, the count was abandoned when it became impossible to vouch for who was on the field at the time of the request, and West Torrens went on to win by three goals. The incident was celebrated as one of the sport's 150 greatest moments in the 150th year celebrations in 2008. The debacle was covered in a popular Secret Base video on YouTube.

The other most famous headcount occurred during the Grand Final of the 2018 North East Australian Football League season between Southport and Sydney reserves. Southport was leading by ten goals at three-quarter time but accidentally sent nineteen men onto the field to start the final quarter; Sydney called for a headcount twenty seconds later, and Southport's extra man was discovered. Sydney received a free kick and fifty-metre penalty, and play continued with nobody sure whether or not Southport's score would stand – this incident occurred when the penalty could have been annulment of Southport's entire score. Only a few minutes before the end of the game, NEAFL officials decided not to annul Southport's score, using a separate provision within the laws of the game which allowed the full penalty not to be applied if the breach had no material impact on the game. Southport won the game by 55 points.

Scores which are stripped from a team due to a headcount are also stripped from the players' individual statistics. This had an impact on the 2013 VFL season's leading goalkicker medal: Frankston's Michael Lourey finished one goal behind Port Melbourne's Dean Galea for the medal, having had one of his goals annulled in a headcount earlier in the season.

There have been only three headcounts, all unsuccessful, in the history of the VFL/AFL.

- by St Kilda captain Wels Eicke against Carlton Round 12, 1924;
- by Essendon captain Jack Clarke against North Melbourne in Round 17, 1958;
- by West Coast captain Guy McKenna against St Kilda in Round 22, 1999.

Notable successful headcounts around the country which resulted in the cancellation of a team's score are listed in the table below. Where scores are given, the team which suffered the head-count penalty is listed first.

League	Club penalised	Opponent	Match	Score at count	Count time	Final score	Report
VFA	Richmond	Essendon	Round 9, 1896	3.3 – 2.4	3rd quarter	1.4 – 9.9	
Reporter District FA	Burwood	Camberwell	1911 Final	16 – 10	1st quarter	30 – 32	
VFA	North Melbourne	Preston	1911 season	47 – 13	2nd quarter	69 – 48	
VFA	Prahran	Brighton	Round 10, 1921	26 – 17	1st quarter	34 – 34	
VFA	Northcote	Yarraville	Centenary Cup, 1977	89 – ??	4th quarter	20 – 154	
O&KFL	Moyhu	Whorouly	2008 First Semi-Final	15–22	2nd quarter	9–81	
BL&GFA	Barossa District	Willaston	2011 First Semi-Final	59–59	4th quarter	6–81	
VFL	Frankston	North Ballarat	Round 14, 2013	38 – ??	3rd quarter	23 – 64	

=== Interchange infringement penalties ===
In Round 6, 2008, North Melbourne and Sydney played a controversial drawn match, in which a bungled interchange late in the game left Sydney with 19 men on the field for about a minute, during which time the Swans scored the game-tying behind. Although the AFL's laws allowed for each of the Sydney players to be fined $2500 for the error, there could be no change to the match result because North Melbourne had not called for a headcount. This highlighted the impracticality of the head-count rule in a modern professional league with its rapid use of interchanges for fatigue management.

A few weeks after this incident, the AFL introduced a new rule allowing the interchange steward to inform the umpires of interchange errors: specifically, when a player enters the field before the player he is replacing has left the field, or when a player is interchanged without using the interchange gate. In each case, the penalty is a free kick in the centre of the ground or at the spot of the ball at the time, whichever is the greater penalty against the offending team. If the offending team is not in possession of the ball, the umpire shall impose an additional 50-metre penalty against them. Any score or free kicks given to the opposition when an interchange infringement has occurred are cancelled. This process is seen only at the professional AFL level; lower levels of the sport still rely on the head-count rule to police interchanges. AFL captains retain the right to call for a headcount if they believe an interchange infringement has not been detected by the interchange steward (which would most likely be after an interval), but this has not yet been exercised under the new rules.

In round 10, 2023, in another game between North Melbourne and Sydney, North Melbourne conceded a significant interchange infringement free kick. With the ball in its backline and leading by three points in the final minute, North Melbourne made a 76th interchange, exceeding the interchange cap of 75. The free kick and 50-metre penalty gave Sydney a set shot from the goal line, from which Hayden McLean kicked the winning goal.

== Historical interchange rules and tactics ==
The number of interchanges allowed has followed the following timeline under Australian National Football Council (ANFC) rules:

- Prior to 1930 – there was no provision for either substitution or interchange. A team played with 17 on the field (19 prior to 1899) if a player was injured.
- 1930 – the introduction of a single substitute
- 1946 – the introduction of a second substitute
- 1978 – the replacement of two substitutes with two interchanges

Following the disbandment of the ANFC, the following timeline indicates changes to interchange rules in the AFL. Other leagues have not followed this timeline:

- 1994 – the introduction of a third interchange, and introduction of forced interchange under the blood rule
- 1998 – the introduction of a fourth interchange
- 2011 – the replacement of four interchanges with three interchanges and a substitute
- 2013 – the introduction of forced interchange for concussed players, with the provision for temporary activation of the substitute while a concussion test is conducted
- 2014 – the addition of an interchange cap, limiting teams to 120 interchanges per game
- 2016 – the return to four interchanges without a substitute, reduction of the interchange cap to 90 per game
- 2021 – the reduction of the interchange cap to 75 a game, and introduction of a medical substitute as a fifth bench player.
- 2023 – the changing of the medical substitute to a general substitute.
- 2026 – removal of the substitute and introduction of a fifth interchange player.

Historically, the interchange bench was used sparingly, and mostly to take poor-performing players or players who were injured and unable to continue out of the game. There was a marked change in this at the top level as professionalism grew in the sport between 2000 and 2010, and the interchange bench began to be used much more frequently as a means of rotating players to manage player fatigue through the game and offer rest periods for hard-working players and provide game time for young/old players.

The average number of interchanges in the AFL doubled between 2007 (56 changes per team per game) and 2010 (113 changes per team per game) as coaches sought to give frequent rests to their running players. Rule changes in the 2010s and 2020s placed restrictions on the number of interchanges, on the theory that lower fatigue levels were enabling a more defensive play style which was stifling open play and scoring, and that restricting rotations and increasing fatigue could reverse that trend.

Positions on the Australian rules football field
B:	Back pocket	Full back	Back pocket
HB:	Half-back flank	Centre half-back	Half-back flank
C:	Wing	Centre	Wing
HF:	Half-forward flank	Centre half-forward	Half-forward flank
F:	Forward pocket	Full forward	Forward pocket
Foll:	Ruckman	Ruck rover	Rover
Int:	Interchange	Interchange	Interchange
Int:	Interchange	Interchange	
Coach:	coach		

== Footnotes ==
1. In the AFL's own account of the incident, as published on its website as part of the 150th-anniversary celebrations, the leap over the fence was credited not to Norm Dare, but to Gerry Noonan – who, like Dare, was a former Fitzroy player in the VFL who transferred to West Torrens in 1975. Additionally, the AFL's account of the incident had one other significant factual difference to the account in The Advertiser: the AFL's account indicated that the match was Fred Bills' 300th match, but the account in The Advertiser makes it unequivocally clear that it was Bills' 313th and final match.
