= Heineken Cup Italo-Celtic play-off =

Rugby union competition, 2005 to 2010

The Heineken Cup 24th place play-off, in rugby union, was a single game play-off that was formerly used to determine the final qualifier for the subsequent season's Heineken Cup.

This play-off was scrapped, effective with the 2009–10 season, due to changes in the Heineken Cup qualification format.

== Automatic qualification ==
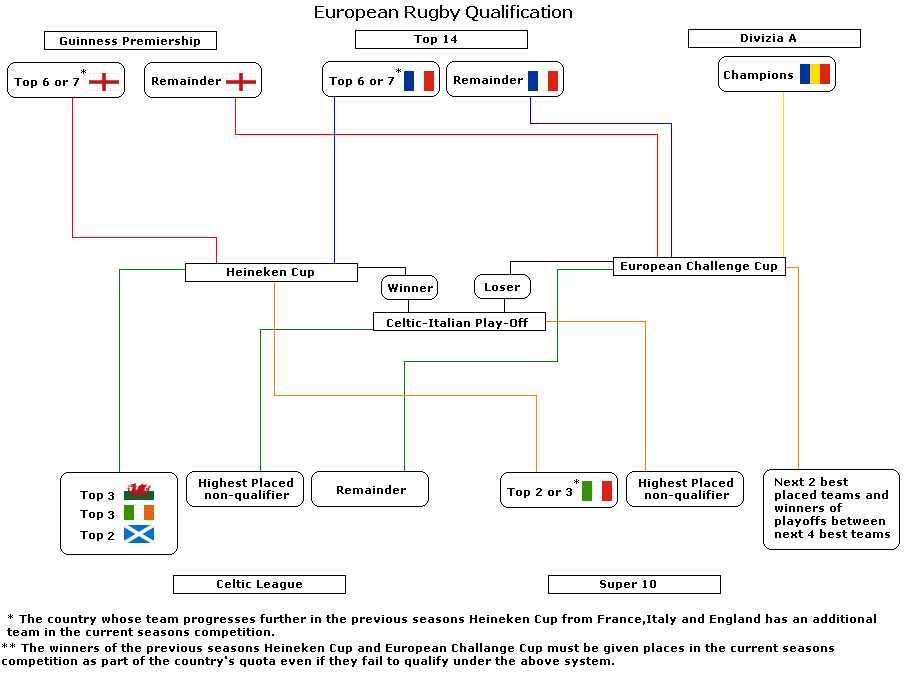
Diagram showing how qualification was obtained for the Heineken Cup and European Challenge Cup before 2009.

Through the 2009–10 edition, the Heineken Cup was open to clubs in the Celtic League, Guinness Premiership, Super 10 (now Top12) and the Top 14. The competition begins with six rounds of pool matches to determine the eight qualifiers for the knockout stages. 24 teams are arranged into six pools of four teams each, with the six pool winners and two best-placed runners-up entering the knockout stages. The 24 pool stage places were allocated as described below.

The first 22 places were awarded as follows:

- England: 6 teams (selected by performance in Guinness Premiership and Anglo-Welsh Cup)
- France: 6 teams (selected by performance in Top 14 Championship)
- Ireland: 3 teams (selected by performance in Celtic League)
- Wales: 3 teams (selected by performance in Celtic League)
- Scotland: 2 teams (selected by participation in Celtic League)
- Italy: 2 teams (selected by performance in Eccellenza)

The 23rd team was chosen from either France, England or Italy and was allocated to the country whose team progressed further in the previous season's Heineken Cup.

The European Challenge Cup winner received an automatic place in the Heineken Cup, taken from its country's allocation.

The final qualifier was determined from the result of the 24th place or Italo-Celtic play-off.

== The play-off ==
The final qualifier was the winner of the 24th place play-off, which took place between the best placed team in the Celtic League that did not automatically qualify and the best-placed semi-finalist in the Italian Super 10 competition. The play-off was a single match, which took place alternately in Italy or the home of the Celtic League side.

In 2007–08, this play-off was scheduled to take place before the Italian Super 10 semi-finals, so no Italian team was nominated to take part. This meant that the Celtic League nominee, the Newport Gwent Dragons, qualified without a playoff.

The play-off first came about in 2004 after the dissolution of the Celtic Warriors meaning that there would be only four Welsh teams to compete for four places in the Heineken Cup.

== Changes from 2009–10 ==
The play-off was scrapped for the 2009–10 season due to changes made that season by the competition organisers, European Rugby Cup, that will take effect with the 2010–11 Heineken Cup. The new qualifying system is as follows:

- The first 22 places will remain unchanged, except that the two Italian places will be taken up by the two Italian teams entering the Celtic League for the 2010–11 season (the Super 10 will revert to a semi-professional developmental league to accommodate this change).
- The remaining two places will now be filled by the winners of the Heineken Cup and European Challenge Cup. If a trophy winner has already qualified for the Heineken Cup by virtue of its league position, that country will receive an extra Heineken Cup place (assuming that the country has an extra team that can take up a place; Scotland has only two top-level professional teams, as will Italy from the 2010–11 season onward).
- However, England and France are capped at seven Heineken Cup places each. If either country produces the winners of both European cups, the last place will be filled by the highest ERC-ranked club not of that nation to not have otherwise qualified.

== Results ==
Season	Winner	Score	Runner-up	Venue	Attendance
2004–05; 2005–06 Heineken Cup	(Wales) Cardiff Blues	38 – 9	(Italy) Arix Viadana	Stadio Luigi Zaffanella, Viadana	1,750
2005–06; 2006–07 Heineken Cup	(Italy) Overmach Parma	24 – 15	(Wales) Newport Gwent Dragons	Rodney Parade, Newport	6,000
2006–07; 2007–08 Heineken Cup	(Wales) Newport Gwent Dragons	22 – 15	(Italy) Ghial Calvisano	Rodney Parade, Newport	5,326
2007–08; 2008–09 Heineken Cup	(Wales) Newport Gwent Dragons	N/A - decided on league position	(Ireland) Connacht	N/A	N/A
2008–09; 2009–10 Heineken Cup	(Wales) Newport Gwent Dragons	42 – 17	(Italy) Ghial Calvisano	Centro Sportivo San Michele, Calvisano	2,250
