= 2008–09 Heineken Cup =

Annual rugby union competition

Tournament details
- Countries: England; France; Ireland; Italy; Scotland; Wales
- Tournament format(s): Round-robin and Knockout
- Date: 10 October 2008 – 23 May 2009

Tournament statistics
- Teams: 24
- Matches played: 79
- Attendance: 1,177,064 (14,900 per match)
- Top point scorer(s): Ben Blair (Cardiff) (99 points)
- Top try scorer(s): Brian O'Driscoll (Leinster) (5 tries)

Final
- Venue: Murrayfield Stadium, Edinburgh
- Attendance: 66,523
- Champions: (Ireland) Leinster (1st title)
- Runners-up: (England) Leicester Tigers

The 2008–09 Heineken Cup was the fourteenth edition of the Heineken Cup, the annual rugby union European club competition for clubs from the top six nations in European rugby. It started in October 2008 and ended on 23 May 2009 at Murrayfield Stadium in Edinburgh. Irish side Leinster became the champions, defeating Leicester Tigers 19–16 in the final.

== Teams ==
Seven French teams competed, as a French team, Toulouse, progressed further in the previous year's tournament than any English or Italian team.

Four Welsh teams competed, as Italy forfeited its place in the Italo-Celtic playoff and a Welsh team were the highest-placed team in the previous year's Celtic league not to qualify otherwise. Other nations had their usual number of participants: England six, Ireland three, Italy two and Scotland two.

England	France	Wales	Ireland	Scotland	Italy
Gloucester; London Wasps; Bath; Leicester Tigers; Sale Sharks; Harlequins	Toulouse; Biarritz; Stade Français; Clermont; Perpignan; Castres; Montauban	Cardiff Blues; Scarlets; Ospreys; Newport Gwent Dragons	Leinster; Munster; Ulster	Edinburgh; Glasgow Warriors	Calvisano; Benetton Treviso

== Seeding ==
The seeding system for participating teams changed from previous editions of the Heineken Cup. Previously, each participating nation would seed one of their teams and these six teams would be drawn in different groups at the group stage. Starting with the 2008–09 edition, the 24 competing teams were ranked based on past Heineken Cup and European Challenge Cup performance, with each group receiving one team from each quartile, or Tier. The requirement to have only one team per country in each group however, still applied (with the exception of the inclusion of the seventh French team).

The brackets show each team's European Rugby Club Ranking before the start of the 2008–09 season.

Tier 1	(Ireland) Munster (1)	(France) Toulouse (2)	(France) Biarritz (3)	(England) Leicester Tigers (4)	(France) Stade Français (5)	(England) London Wasps (6)
Tier 2	(Ireland) Leinster (7)	(England) Bath (8)	(England) Gloucester (9)	(France) Perpignan (10)	(England) Sale Sharks (12)	(Wales) Scarlets (13)
Tier 3	(Wales) Ospreys (15)	(Wales) Cardiff Blues (17)	(France) Clermont (18)	(Wales) Newport Gwent Dragons (20)	(Ireland) Ulster (21)	(France) Castres (22)
Tier 4	(Scotland) Glasgow Warriors (24)	(Italy) Benetton Treviso (25)	(Scotland) Edinburgh (28)	(Italy) Calvisano (32)	(England) Harlequins (35)	(France) Montauban

== Pool stage ==
The draw for the pool stages took place on 17 June 2008 in Dublin.

Key to colours
Winner of each pool, and two best runners-up, advance to quarterfinals. Seed # in parentheses

=== Pool 1 ===
Team	P	W	D	L	Tries for	Tries against	Try diff	Points for	Points against	Points diff	TB	LB	Pts
(Ireland) Munster (2)	6	5	0	1	18	6	12	161	98	63	2	1	23
(England) Sale	6	3	0	3	14	11	3	136	115	21	2	1	15
(France) Clermont	6	3	0	3	14	13	1	137	129	8	1	0	13
(France) Montauban	6	1	0	5	5	21	−16	81	173	−92	0	2	6

=== Pool 2 ===
Team	P	W	D	L	Tries for	Tries against	Try diff	Points for	Points against	Points diff	TB	LB	Pts
(Ireland) Leinster (6)	6	4	0	2	15	3	12	140	70	70	2	2	20
(England) Wasps	6	4	0	2	9	12	−3	114	112	2	0	1	17
(Scotland) Edinburgh	6	2	0	4	8	8	0	91	103	−12	1	0	9
(France) Castres	6	2	0	4	6	15	−9	73	133	−60	0	1	9

=== Pool 3 ===
Team	P	W	D	L	Tries for	Tries against	Try diff	Points for	Points against	Points diff	TB	LB	Pts
(England) Leicester Tigers (4)	6	4	0	2	23	6	17	191	90	101	3	2	21
(Wales) Ospreys (7)	6	4	0	2	17	3	14	155	71	84	2	2	20
(France) Perpignan	6	4	0	2	17	10	7	154	120	34	1	1	18
(Italy) Benetton Treviso	6	0	0	6	5	43	−38	72	291	−219	0	0	0

=== Pool 4 ===
Team	P	W	D	L	Tries for	Tries against	Try diff	Points for	Points against	Points diff	TB	LB	Pts
(England) Harlequins (3)	6	5	0	1	16	12	4	144	115	29	2	0	22
(France) Stade Français	6	3	0	3	13	11	2	131	109	22	1	2	15
(Ireland) Ulster	6	2	1	3	13	13	0	113	134	−21	0	1	11
(Wales) Scarlets	6	1	1	4	12	18	−6	124	154	−30	0	2	8

=== Pool 5 ===
Team	P	W	D	L	Tries for	Tries against	Try diff	Points for	Points against	Points diff	TB	LB	Pts
(England) Bath (5)	6	4	1	1	13	8	5	107	92	15	2	1	21
(France) Toulouse (8)	6	4	1	1	12	8	4	121	88	33	1	1	20
(Scotland) Glasgow	6	2	0	4	14	17	−3	134	150	−16	1	3	12
(Wales) Newport Gwent Dragons	6	1	0	5	8	14	−6	83	115	−32	0	3	7

=== Pool 6 ===
Team	P	W	D	L	Tries for	Tries against	Try diff	Points for	Points against	Points diff	TB	LB	Pts
(Wales) Cardiff Blues (1)	6	6	0	0	23	9	14	202	99	103	3	0	27
(France) Biarritz	6	3	0	3	14	4	10	121	88	33	1	2	15
(England) Gloucester	6	3	0	3	17	12	5	156	109	47	2	1	15
(Italy) Calvisano	6	0	0	6	8	37	−29	87	270	−183	0	0	0

=== Seeding and runners-up ===
Seed	Pool Winners	Pts	TF	+/−
1	(Wales) Cardiff Blues	27	23	+103
2	(Ireland) Munster	23	18	+63
3	(England) Harlequins	22	16	+29
4	(England) Leicester Tigers	21	23	+101
5	(England) Bath	21	13	+15
6	(Ireland) Leinster	20	15	+70
Seed	Pool Runners-up	Pts	TF	+/−
7	(Wales) Ospreys	20	17	+84
8	(France) Toulouse	20	12	+33
–	(England) Sale	19	14	+21
–	(England) Wasps	17	7	+8
–	(France) Biarritz	15	14	+33
–	(France) Stade Français	15	13	+22

== Knockout stage ==
The draw for the quarter-finals took place on 27 January at Murrayfield Stadium.

=== Quarter-finals ===
11 April 2009
15:30

Cardiff Blues (Wales)	9–6	(France) Toulouse
Pen: Blair (3/3) 1', 30', 57'	Report	Pen: Michalak (1/1) 5'; Skrela (1/1) 64'

Millennium Stadium, Cardiff
Attendance: 36,728
Referee: Chris White (England)

11 April 2009
18:00

Leicester Tigers (England)	20–15	(England) Bath
Try: Dupuy 80' m Pen: Vesty (5/5) 20', 22', 51', 55', 67'	Report	Try: Berne 35' c Maddock 64' m Con: James (1/2); Pen: James (1/2) 45'

Walkers Stadium, Leicester
Attendance: 26,100
Referee: Alan Lewis (Ireland)

12 April 2009
13:00

Munster (Ireland)	43–9	(Wales) Ospreys
Try: Warwick 34' c O'Connell 55' c Earls (2) 63' c, 65' c Con: O'Gara (4/4); Pen: O'Gara (3/3) 14', 20', 50'; Drop: Warwick (2) 39', 58'	Report	Pen: Hook (3/6) 16', 30', 45'

Thomond Park, Limerick
Attendance: 26,000
Referee: Wayne Barnes (England)

12 April 2009
15:30

Harlequins (England)	5–6	(Ireland) Leinster
Try: Brown 65' m	Report	Pen: Contepomi (2/2) 15', 39'

Twickenham Stoop, London
Attendance: 12,638
Referee: Nigel Owens (Wales)

- This match became notorious for the "Bloodgate" scandal. Quins coach Dean Richards was banned from rugby for three years for his role in faking an injury to wing Tom Williams so that Quins could send in a blood replacement. Williams himself was initially banned for a year, but after he revealed the full extent of the scheme, the ban was reduced to four months.

=== Semi-finals ===
2 May 2009
17:30

Munster (Ireland)	6–25	(Ireland) Leinster
Pen: O'Gara (2/2) 18', 36'	Report; Report	Try: D'Arcy 30' m Fitzgerald 42' c B. O'Driscoll 61' c Con: Sexton (2/3); Pen: Sexton (1/1) 26'; Drop: Contepomi (1/1) 15'

Croke Park, Dublin
Attendance: 82,208
Referee: Nigel Owens (Wales)

3 May 2009
15:00

Cardiff Blues (Wales)	26–26 (a.e.t.)	(England) Leicester Tigers
Try: Roberts 73' c James 74' c Con: Blair (2/2); Pen: Blair (2/2) 14', 33'; Halfpenny 27', 35'	Report	Try: Hamilton 21' c G. Murphy 45' c Con: Dupuy (2/2); Pen: Dupuy (4/7) 24', 38', 54', 56'
	Penalties
Blair; N. Robinson; Halfpenny; Sweeney; James; Shanklin; Rees; M. Williams	6–7	Dupuy; Vesty; G. Murphy; J. Murphy; Hamilton; Mauger; Newby; Crane

Millennium Stadium, Cardiff
Attendance: 44,212
Referee: Alain Rolland (Ireland)

=== Final ===
23 May 2009
17:00

Leicester Tigers (England)	16–19	(Ireland) Leinster
Try: Woods 38' c Con: Dupuy (1/1); Pen: Dupuy (3/3) 8', 33', 42'	(Report)	Try: Heaslip 49' c Con: Sexton (1/1); Pen: Sexton (2/3) 24', 70'; Drop: O'Driscoll (1/1) 5'; Sexton (1/1) 17'

Murrayfield Stadium, Edinburgh
Attendance: 66,523
Referee: Nigel Owens (Wales)
