= Bishop Challoner Catholic College =

Location
- Institute Road, Kings Heath; Birmingham, West Midlands, B14 7EG; England; 52.4329°N 1.8903°W

Information
- Type: Voluntary aided school
- Motto: Laus Deo (Praise God)
- Religious affiliation: Roman Catholic
- Established: 1953
- Local authority: Birmingham
- Specialist: Sports College, Training School and Science College
- Department for Education URN: 103560 Tables
- Ofsted: Reports
- Head teacher: Dr J Coughlan
- Staff: 90
- Gender: Co-educational
- Age: 11 to 18
- Enrolment: 1,152
- Colour: purple
- Website: http://www.bishopchalloner.org.uk/

Bishop Challoner Catholic College is a Roman Catholic secondary school in the Kings Heath area of Birmingham, England. The school has a roll of 1,152 students, including 212 sixth form students.

One of the first 100 Teaching Schools, the school is a nationally recognised leader in the fields of Initial Teacher Education, research and development and also in supporting school improvement. Professional development programmes provide support for thousands of colleagues both within and beyond their Teaching School Alliance. Bishop Challoner Catholic College is the lead school for the Central Maths Hub and the Central Midland Science Learning Partnership, working with hundreds of schools across the Midlands to support STEM subjects. Bishop Challoner Catholic College are at the heart of the development and delivery of programmes to support non-specialist teachers in physics, maths and MFL and works in partnership with the Royal Society to develop STEM projects and resources that benefit pupils across multiple schools.

== History ==
Opened in 1953, it was the first Catholic secondary school in Birmingham. John Welford was the first Headteacher of the school and he was in post until 1964.

== Arts ==
For the second time, the school has received a Government School Achievement Award for examination results, the National Curriculum Award and Artsmark Gold for the provision of drama, music, dance, art and performance in the school. The school's production of West Side Story, Beauty and the Beast, Big the Musical and We Will Rock You, have won the Columba Trophy for the best school production in Birmingham. The school has had its fair few alumni including Olympic gymnast Dominick Cunningham.

The Performing Arts, We Sing Show Choir were given the 'once-in-a-lifetime' opportunity of performing as part of the choir at the Mass which was taken by Pope Benedict XVI. The Mass, held at Cofton Park in Longbridge, was the pinnacle of the Pope's visit to Great Britain and was his final visit before returning to the Vatican in Rome. After weeks of rehearsals, the 10 students and 3 teachers joined the 2200 other choristers from across the country and were seated in the Grandstand directly to the left of the Pope as he delivered the Mass. Continuing this success, the Choir secured one of three places in the final of a national search for the UK's best Glee Club. The best club would win a once-in-a-lifetime opportunity to perform on the West End stage at London's Apollo Victoria Theatre, home of WICKED, in December 2010. The competition was judged by members of the WICKED cast including Lee Mead (BBC's Any Dream Will Do), Rachel Tucker (BBC's I'd Do Anything) and Louise Dearman at WICKED Day.

== Academic performance ==
The school has improved since 1998 when 37% of pupils received 5 or more A*-C grades at GCSE. In 2008, this figure had risen to over 80% of pupils receiving 5 or more A*-C grades. In March 2009 the school achieved an 'Outstanding' grade in its Section 5 and Section 48 OFSTED inspection reports.

== Alumni ==
- Richard Blaze (b. 1985) - rugby union player
