= Blood rule =

Sports rule

A blood rule is a rule used in many sports that generally states that an athlete that receives an open wound, is bleeding, or who has blood on them or their clothes, must immediately leave the playing area to receive medical attention. Though they may be able to play again later, they cannot continue until the wound is taken care of, bleeding has stopped, and all contaminated equipment has been replaced. The main concern addressed by these rules is the spread of infectious diseases.

Some sports where this is used are Australian Rules Football, NCAA Baseball, and some major American sports leagues.

In the National Rugby League, for example, play stops whilst the player's medical staff attends to the wound. If the bleeding is not stopped to the referee's satisfaction, the player must then leave the field for further attention. In sports such as association football, a player may leave the field without being substituted immediately, his team playing short-handed until he re-enters play, is replaced, or the match ends (if the injury cannot be satisfactorily healed and the team is out of substitutions).

== See also ==
- Blood replacement, a special substitution in rugby codes for blood-injured players.
