= Martyn Williams =

Wales and British Lions international rugby union player

Martyn Williams MBE
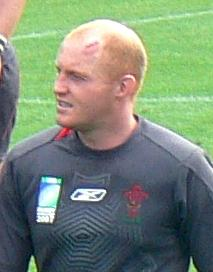
- Williams from 2007 Rugby World Cup under Wales team
- Born: Martyn Elwyn Williams; 1 September 1975 (age 51) Pontypridd, Wales
- Height: 185 cm (6 ft 1 in)
- Weight: 97 kg (15 st 4 lb; 214 lb)
- School: Coedylan Comprehensive School

Rugby union career
- Position: Flanker
Senior career
Years	Team	Apps	(Points)
1994–1999	Pontypridd	98	(120)
1999–2003	Cardiff RFC	83	(60)
2003–2012	Cardiff Blues	143	(90)
International career
Years	Team	Apps	(Points)
1996–2012	Wales	100	(73)
2001–2009	British & Irish Lions	4	(0)

Martyn Elwyn Williams, MBE (born 1 September 1975) is a Welsh former professional rugby union player who played as a flanker. He earned 100 caps for the Wales national team, the most by a forward until he was surpassed by Gethin Jenkins in November 2013. He remains Wales's most-capped back-row forward. He also played for the British & Irish Lions, touring Australia in 2001, New Zealand in 2005 and South Africa in 2009. Overall, he played 17 times for the Lions across the 3 tours scoring 2 tries in provencial games, which included 4 test matches (NZ and SA*3).

== Club career ==
Williams played club rugby for Pontypridd, with whom he won the 1996–97 Welsh league, then moved to Cardiff RFC in 1999. He was named captain in 2002, and retained the role when the Cardiff Blues regional team was established in 2003. Rhys Williams took over the role in 2005.

In the Heineken Cup semi-final match against Leicester Tigers on 3 May 2009, Williams missed a crucial kick in the penalty shootout after the game had finished level after extra time, allowing Jordan Crane to step up and score the winning kick. It was the first time that a professional rugby union match had been decided by a shootout.

In March 2012, Williams announced that he would retire at the end of the 2011–12 season.

== International career ==
=== Wales ===
After gaining international caps at every junior level he won his first Wales A cap in 1996 and then made the senior side against the Barbarians the same year. His first appearance in the Five Nations Championship was against England in 1998. He captained Wales for the first time against Scotland at Murrayfield in 2003.

He won his 50th Welsh cap against England in the first match of the 2005 Six Nations Championship and played a prominent part in Wales' Grand Slam that year, notably scoring two tries early in the second half against France in Paris when Wales had appeared to be heading for defeat. He was named RBS Six Nations player of the Championship (2005).

Williams announced his retirement from international rugby on 1 October 2007, following Wales' early exit from the 2007 Rugby World Cup only to make a surprise decision to return to international action when he was recalled by new Wales head coach Warren Gatland in January 2008. He was a key member of Wales Grand Slam winning side of 2008, and was considered by many to be one of the best players in the tournament.

Williams currently holds the Welsh record for most appearances in the Five and Six Nations championships, surpassing Gareth Edwards' record of 45 appearances in the third round of the 2009 Six Nations. He attained his 100th cap against the Barbarians on 2 June 2012.

=== British & Irish Lions ===
Williams was selected for the British & Irish Lions tours to Australia in 2001 and to New Zealand in 2005. He was also named as part of Ian McGeechan's 37-man British & Irish Lions squad to tour South Africa in the summer of 2009. He is now the Welsh Rugby Team Manager

=== International tries ===
Try	Opponent	Location	Venue	Competition	Date	Result
1	Ireland	Cardiff, Wales	Millennium Stadium	2003 Six Nations	22 March 2003	Loss
2	Tonga	Canberra, Australia	Bruce Stadium	2003 Rugby World Cup	19 October 2003	Win
3	England	Brisbane, Australia	Lang Park	2003 Rugby World Cup	9 November 2003	Loss
4	France	Cardiff, Wales	Millennium Stadium	2004 Six Nations	7 March 2004	Loss
5	Italy	Rome, Italy	Stadio Olimpico	2005 Six Nations	12 February 2005	Win
6	France	Paris, France	Stade de France	2005 Six Nations	26 February 2005	Win
7	France	Paris, France	Stade de France	2005 Six Nations	26 February 2005	Win
8	England	London, England	Twickenham	2006 Six Nations	4 February 2006	Loss
9	Australia	Cardiff, Wales	Millennium Stadium	2006 Autumn Internationals	4 November 2006	Draw
10	New Zealand	Cardiff, Wales	Millennium Stadium	2006 Autumn Internationals	25 November 2006	Loss
11	Japan	Cardiff, Wales	Millennium Stadium	2007 Rugby World Cup	20 September 2007	Win
12	Japan	Cardiff, Wales	Millennium Stadium	2007 Rugby World Cup	20 September 2007	Win
13	Fiji	Nantes, France	Stade de la Beaujoire	2007 Rugby World Cup	29 September 2007	Loss
14	France	Cardiff, Wales	Millennium Stadium	2008 Six Nations	15 March 2008	Win

== Personal life ==
He played centre-back for the Welsh YMCA U16 football side.

Williams was appointed Member of the Order of the British Empire (MBE) in the 2012 New Year Honours for services to rugby. In July 2012, Williams was made an honorary fellow of Cardiff University.

== Publications ==
He re-released his autobiography Magnificent Seven in August 2008 after coming out of international retirement.
