= Bloodgate =

Sporting scandal in rugby union

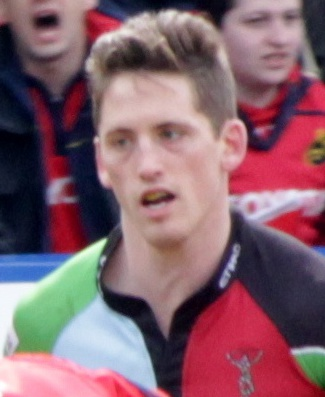
Williams in 2013

Bloodgate was a 2009 rugby union scandal involving English team Harlequins in their European Champions Cup quarter-final against Irish side Leinster on 12 April 2009. Harlequins wing Tom Williams feigned an injury using a fake blood capsule in order for Harlequins to make another substitution late in the game.

The incident resulted in bans for Williams, director of rugby Dean Richards and physiotherapist Steph Brennan, as well as a fine for the club. It has been described as "rugby's biggest scandal".

== Events ==
Seven minutes into the second half of their 2008–09 Heineken Cup quarter-final against Leinster, Harlequins fly-half Nick Evans suffered a thigh injury and was replaced by Chris Malone. Malone tore his hamstring 20 minutes later and was replaced by winger Tom Williams, leaving full-back Mike Brown as the best available place kicker. With eight minutes to play and the score at 6–5 to Leinster, Brown had the chance to give Harlequins the lead from a penalty, but he pushed his kick wide. Williams himself then came off with an apparent blood injury allowing Evans to return to the field, despite having been substituted earlier. Evans' late drop goal attempt went wide, and Leinster went on to win the game, and eventually, went on to win the entire tournament.

== Aftermath ==
An investigation by the European Rugby Cup and the Rugby Football Union revealed that blood injuries had also been faked by Harlequins to enable tactical substitutions on four previous occasions. These findings resulted in a 12-month ban for Williams (reduced to four months on appeal), a three-year ban for former director of rugby Dean Richards and a two-year ban for physiotherapist Steph Brennan, as well as a £260,000 fine for the club. Club chairman Charles Jillings subsequently tendered his resignation, while club doctor Wendy Chapman was suspended by the General Medical Council pending a disciplinary panel hearing into her cutting of Williams' lip to hide his use of the blood capsule. On 2 September 2009, it was reported that Harlequins had escaped being thrown out of the Heineken Cup following the scandal when the European Rugby Cup board said they approved of the penalties already handed out.

Mark Evans, chief executive of Harlequin FC said:

You would be incredibly naive to think (the Bloodgate stigma) will ever disappear completely. Things like that don't. They become part of history and, like good or bad seasons, are woven into the fabric of any club.

Richards resigned from his post at Harlequins over the incident, in which it was acknowledged that he had orchestrated it and had "central control". He was given a three-year suspension from coaching as punishment. The International Rugby Board (IRB) also confirmed that they would apply the ban to rugby union worldwide.

Dr. Chapman, the medic who cut Williams' lip, appeared before the General Medical Council charged with alleged conduct likely to bring the profession into disrepute. The appearance resulted in Dr. Chapman being warned but allowed to continue practising medicine.
