= Blood replacement =

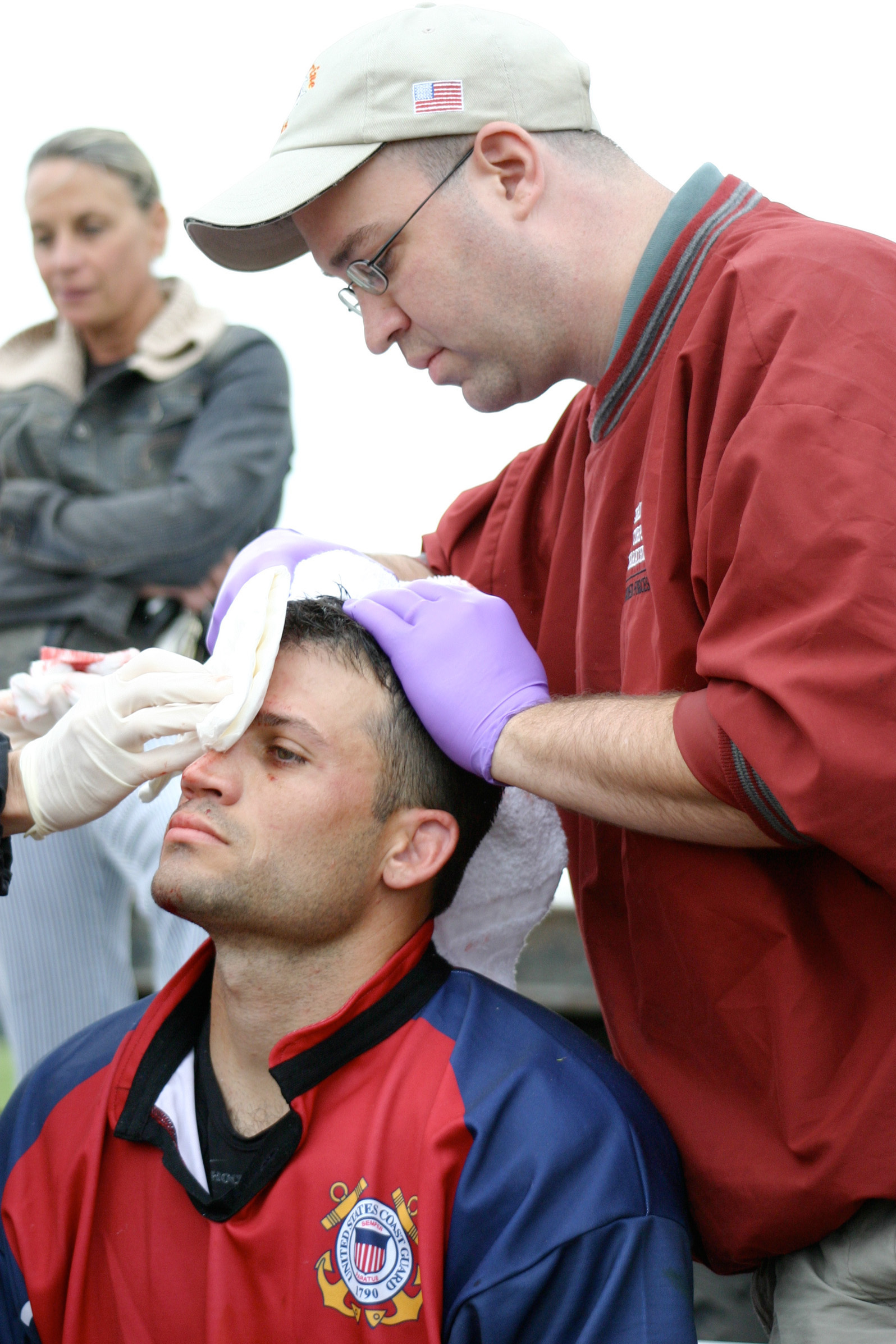
A rugby player is treated for a head injury.

In both rugby union and rugby league, a blood replacement (also referred to as a blood substitution or blood bin) is a special kind of substitution which can be used in the case of a player having to leave the field of play temporarily to have a wound attended to. Both rugby union and rugby league are physically demanding games, so musculoskeletal injuries are common, as well as injuries to the head and neck, and fractures. During the IRB 2011 Rugby World Cup, a study was conducted to determine the frequency and nature of the injuries sustained. It confirmed that rugby, like many other contact sports, has a high incidence of injury.

== Rugby union ==
In rugby union, blood replacements are provided for by Law 3.10 of the International Rugby Board.

A player who has been wounded may be replaced for up to fifteen minutes (running time), during which he or she may receive first-aid treatment to stanch the flow of blood and dress the wound. The player may then ask the referee to return to the pitch of play. The return-to-play regulation is a regulation in rugby union that reduces the likelihood of premature return-to-play by injured players. However studies have shown that there is a high rate of non-compliance with this regulation and therefore highlights the need for implementation and dissemination of the return-to-play regulation.

== Rugby league ==
In rugby league, blood replacement substitutions are enforced by the referee after he has noticed that a player is bleeding. This change takes the place of one of the allocated 10 replacements that teams are allowed. In the case of misconduct, where the incident leading to the injury has been either placed on report or sin-binned or sent off, then the replacement is free (does not count) however when the player returns this counts as an interchange. The blood bin was first used in 1991.

== Gamesmanship ==
Fake blood injuries have been used for tactical benefit, to enable teams to withdraw a player they may wish to bring back on later. A notable example was the "Bloodgate" incident, where Harlequins wing Tom Williams came off the field with what turned out to be a faked blood injury in order to facilitate a tactical substitution. An investigation by the ERC and the RFU revealed that blood injuries had also been faked by Harlequins to enable tactical substitutions on four previous occasions. These findings resulted in a four-month ban for Williams, a three-year ban for former director of rugby Dean Richards and a two-year ban for physiotherapist Steph Brennan as well as a £260,000 fine for the club.
