= Jordan Crane (rugby union) =

England international rugby union player

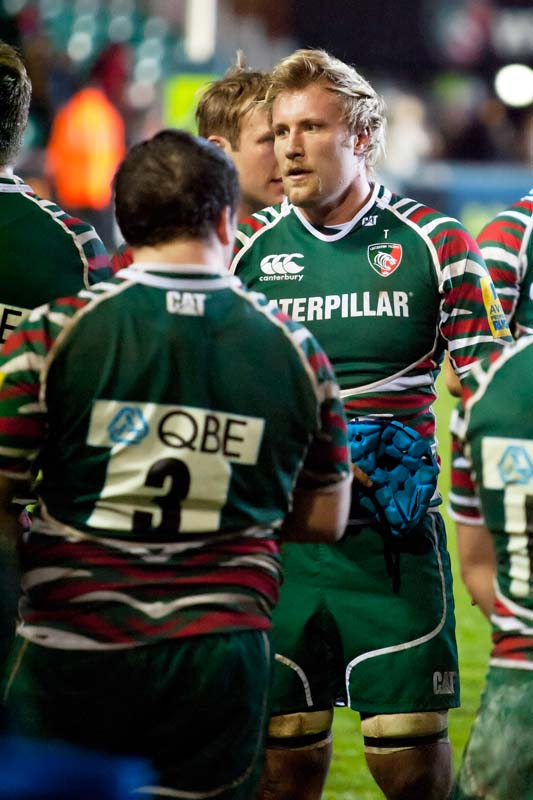
- Crane in 2012
- Born: Jordan Stephen Crane; 3 June 1986 (age 40) Bromsgrove, Worcestershire
- Height: 1.91 m (6 ft 3 in)
- Weight: 109 kg (17 st 2 lb)
- School: South Bromsgrove High School; Colston's School

Rugby union career
- Position: Number eight / Flanker / Lock
Senior career
Years	Team	Apps	(Points)
2004–2006	Leeds Tykes	29	(25)
2006–2016	Leicester Tigers	223	(150)
2016–2020	Bristol Bears	57	(40)
2004–2020	Total	309	(215)
International career
Years	Team	Apps	(Points)
2007–2011	England Saxons	4	(5)
2008–2009	England	3	(0)
Coaching career
- Years: Team
- 2020–: Bristol Bears (academy)

Jordan Stephen Crane (born 3 June 1986 in Bromsgrove) is a former professional rugby union player, who recently played for Bristol Bears in the Premiership Rugby. Crane has also played internationally for England.

Crane is renowned for his impressive physique and powerful runs from the base of the scrum. He consistently ranks as one of the most frequent carriers of the ball in English club rugby.

He switched to playing rugby union relatively late after playing football for a number of professional clubs' junior sides.

== Club career ==
Crane made his debut for his former club, Leeds Tykes, in the nine-all draw at FC Grenoble in the European Challenge Cup in October 2004 aged just 18. He went on to make 29 appearances for the Tykes in all competitions scoring five tries, including a hat trick against Valladolid RAC in the European Challenge Cup.

After Leeds were relegated in the 2005–06 season, Crane left the club to sign for the Leicester Tigers.

In the Heineken Cup semi-final match against Cardiff Blues on 3 May 2009, Crane scored the winning kick in the penalty shootout after the game had finished level after extra time. It was the first time a Heineken Cup tie had been decided in a shootout. Crane started in the subsequent 2009 Heineken Cup Final. Crane scored the only try in the final of the 2008–09 Guinness Premiership as Leicester defeated London Irish. He also started as Leicester won the 2010 and 2013 Premiership finals. Crane spent the whole of the 2011–12 Aviva Premiership campaign injured.

After 10 years playing with Leicester, Crane announced his signing with Bristol Bears on a three-year contract from the 2016–17 season.

== International career ==
Crane made his U21 debut in February 2006 scoring a try against Wales at Worcester, and he was an ever-present in their successful U21 Grand Slam campaign. This was his second successive age group Grand Slam, as he had captained England's U19 side to success the season before. Crane has also captained England at U18 level and took over the leadership role when his new teammate, Matt Cornwell, was injured during the 2006 IRB U21 World Cup in France, fulfilling the promise shown when competing for Colston's School in the final of the Daily Mail U18 Cup competition at Twickenham.

Crane was selected in the England Saxons squad for the 2006–07 season, and went on to compete at the 2007 Churchill Cup. Crane also played in the 2008 Churchill Cup, winning the tournament's Most Valuable Player award.

On 1 June 2008, he was named in Martin Johnson's Elite Player Squad and made his debut as a replacement against South Africa. He was returned to the Saxons squad when Johnson chose to retain Nick Easter for the 2009 Six Nations. Crane won his second cap against Argentina at Old Trafford.
