= Ben Woods =

English rugby union player

- Born: Ben Woods; 9 June 1982 (age 44) Barnsley, Yorkshire
- Height: 1.85 m (6 ft 1 in)
- Weight: 107 kg (16 st 12 lb)
- School: Queen Elizabeth Grammar School, Wakefield
- University: Hatfield College, Durham; Hughes Hall, Cambridge

Rugby union career
- Position: Flanker
Amateur team(s)
| Years | Team | Apps | (Points) |
- Durham City 2nd XV
| – | Cambridge University R.U.F.C. | | |
| – | The Owls, The Titans RFC | | |
Senior career
| Years | Team | Apps | (Points) |
| 2003–2008 | Newcastle Falcons | 101 | (30) |
| 2008–2012 | Leicester Tigers | 70 | (25) |
- Correct as of 13 June 2009
International career
| Years | Team | Apps | (Points) |
| 2006–2012 | England Saxons | 8 | (0) |

Benjamin Woods (born 9 June 1982) is a retired rugby union player who played for Newcastle Falcons and Leicester Tigers as an openside flanker.

Woods started his professional career at Newcastle Falcons in 2003 but suffered a badly broken leg at the end of his first season and was sidelined for 18 months. On his return to the game he quickly made his mark on the Falcons first team and earned a call up to play for the England Saxons in the 2006 Churchill Cup.

He was also selected for 2007 Churchill Cup. Woods played in the Saxons side that defeated Ireland A on 1 February 2008 at Welford Road.

Woods left the Falcons and moved to Leicester Tigers in 2008 along with Toby Flood.

Injury to Lewis Moody allowed Woods to make his mark at Leicester and he played in 23 games for them in his first season, culminating in a try scoring appearance in the 2009 Heineken Cup Final. He also started that year's Premiership final as Leicester defeated London Irish. The following year he was a replacement as Leicester retained the Premiership.

Woods started in all three games of the 2009 Churchill Cup.

He captained Tigers for the first time in the vital LV= Cup win at Harlequins in 2011/12.

== Retirement ==
On 5 September 2012, Woods announced via Twitter that he would be retiring from rugby due to a wrist injury.
