= Tom Williams (rugby union, born 1983) =

English rugby union player

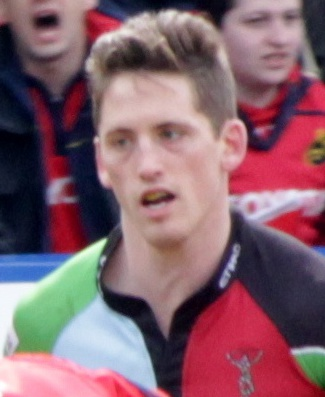
- Williams in 2013
- Born: Thomas Williams; 12 October 1983 (age 43) Brighton, England
- Height: 1.80 m (5 ft 11 in)
- Weight: 91 kg (14 st 5 lb)

Rugby union career
- Position: Wing / Full-back
Senior career
Years	Team	Apps	(Points)
2004–15	Harlequins	208	(304)
National sevens team
Years	Team		Comps
2004–	England		Hong Kong

Tom Williams (born 12 October 1983) is an English former rugby union player who played for Harlequins in the Aviva Premiership. He normally played at either full-back or on the wing.

== Early life ==
Williams was born in Brighton and attended Windlesham House School. He represented Wales at U16 and U19 levels, then switched to England for the 2002 IRB U19 World Cup.

== International career ==
Williams represented England in the 2003-04 World Sevens Series, winning the Hong Kong leg. He also competed in the 2006-07 IRB Sevens World Series.

== Club career ==
Williams started and scored a try for Harlequins in their 2011–12 Premiership final victory over Leicester Tigers. He is a member of the “200 Club” having represented Harlequins for over 200 games.

He retired in 2015 moving into a coaching and mentoring role at Harlequins for four years before leaving professional rugby in 2019 to pursue a career in consultancy.

== Bloodgate ==
During the 2008–09 Heineken Cup quarter final against Leinster, Williams was told to fake a blood injury by Dean Richards to allow a tactical substitution to reintroduce Nick Evans leading to the bloodgate scandal. This resulted in a 12-month ban for Williams, (reduced to four months on appeal), a three-year ban for former rugby director Dean Richards as well as a two-year ban for physiotherapist Steph Brennan from the ERC with a £260,000 fine for the club.
