= Coláiste an Spioraid Naoimh =

School in Cork, Ireland

CSN Cork
- Bishopstown, Cork, Ireland

Information
- Type: Non-fee-paying
- Religious affiliation: Roman Catholic
- Established: 1964
- Principal: Colmán Ó Tuama
- Enrollment: c. 700
- Colors: Grey, Black, Red and Gold
- Website: http://www.csncork.ie/

Coláiste an Spioraid Naoimh is an Irish boys' secondary school founded under the patronage of the Presentation Brothers. It is located in Bishopstown, Cork, Ireland.

== History ==
Coláiste an Spioraid Naoimh is a non-fee-paying, Catholic, all-boys school in Bishopstown, Cork. It was founded by Brother Bonaventure of the Presentation Brothers in 1964. The Brothers withdrew from direct management in 1992 but continued their involvement until 2009, when they handed the trusteeship over to the Presentation Brothers School Trust. The school was originally located in Laburnum House, Model Farm Road, and the new school building opened in 1971.

== Sports and societies ==
Basketball began in Coláiste an Spioraid Naoimh in the mid-1980s, and the school won All-Ireland Titles in 1991, 1995, 2005, and 2009. CSN was also named Basketball School of the Year in 2009, and a number of CSN players have played for Irish underage teams.

In Gaelic football, the school has won the Cork Colleges Senior A competition, also known as the Simcox Cup, on several occasions. In 2005, the school went on to win the Munster Colleges Senior A championship, or Corn Uí Mhuirí.

Hurling is also played at the school, and a team from the school won the 1991 Munster B hurling championship and went on to participate in that year's All Ireland final losing to Callan CBS. The school also reached a Munster final in 2007. Among the CSN hurlers who have gone on to play at inter-county level are Brian Murphy and Ronan Curran.

The school has one of the oldest mountaineering clubs in Cork, founded in 1972.

The school also has a debating society which, in 1998, produced the first Irish team to win the UK and Ireland Observer Mace debating competition.

== Alumni ==
- Rubyhorse - band formed in Coláiste an Spioriad Naoimh. Members included David Farrell, Joe Philpott, Declan Lucey, Owen Fegan and Colum Young.
- Owen Fegan - musician and photographer
- John Spillane - folk singer
- Louis de Paor - poet
- Brendan O'Connor - RTÉ media personality, columnist, and comedian
- Philip King - musician, broadcaster and film maker.
- James O'Sullivan - writer and academic

=== Sports ===
- Jimmy Barry-Murphy - former association footballer, hurler, Gaelic footballer, and manager of the Cork senior hurling team
- Damien Cahalane - Cork dual player
- Conor Cahalane - Cork dual player
- Jack Cahalane - Cork dual player
- Patrick Collins - Cork hurler
- Ger Collins - Cork hurler
- Ken O'Halloran - Gaelic footballer
- Paul McGrath - Gaelic footballer
- Neal Horgan - association footballer
- Michael Slocum - Gaelic footballer
- Michael Shields - Gaelic footballer
- Brian Cuthbert - Cork gaelic football manager
- Brian Murphy - Kildare Gaelic footballer
- Ronan Curran - Cork hurler
- Shane O'Neill - Cork hurler
- Tim Ryan - rugby union player
- Dave Ryan - rugby union player
- Jamie O'Sullivan - Gaelic footballer
- John Egan - association footballer
- Conor Dorman - Gaelic footballer
- Ian Maguire - Gaelic footballer
