= 2014–15 Ulster Rugby season =

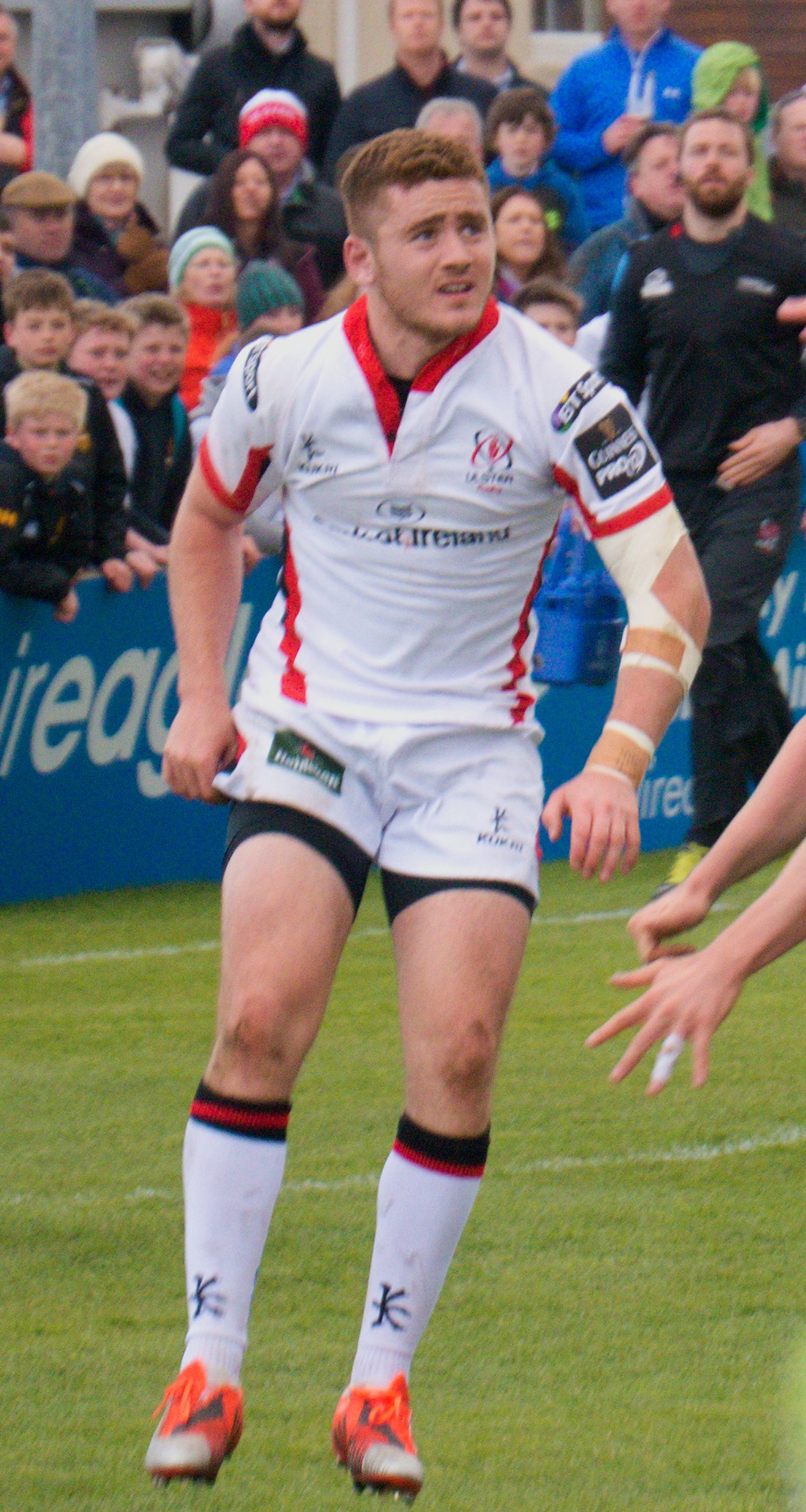
- Paddy Jackson playing against Connacht, Galway Sportsgrounds, 12 April 2015
- Ground: Ravenhill Stadium (Capacity: 12,500)
- Coach(es): Les Kiss (Director of Rugby); Neil Doak (Head Coach)
- Captain: Rory Best
- Top scorer: Ruan Pienaar (121)
- Most tries: Craig Gilroy (12)
- League(s): Heineken Cup (3rd in Pool 3); Pro12 (semi-finals)
1st kit	2nd kit

The 2014–15 season was Ulster's 21st season since the advent of professionalism in rugby union, and their first under Director of Rugby Les Kiss and head coach Neil Doak. They completed in the European Rugby Champions Cup and the Pro12.

New signings for this season included out-half Ian Humphreys, returning from his spell at London Irish, lock Franco van der Merwe, flanker Sean Reidy and fullback Louis Ludik. Rory Best was reinstated as captain, following the retirement of Johann Muller at the end of the previous season.

In June 2014, David Humphreys left his post as the province's Director of Rugby, joining English Premiership side Gloucester. Later that month, head coach Mark Anscombe also left the province "with immediate effect". Ireland assistant coach Les Kiss filled the role of Director of Rugby on an interim basis. In October 2014, Kiss returned to his position with the Ireland team, with Neil Doak taking the role of head coach. Kiss would return to his role with Ulster on a full-time basis following the 2015 World Cup. Bryn Cunningham was appointed the new team manager, responsible for recruiting players and negotiating contracts. Defence coach Jonny Bell left at the end of the season to become assistant coach at Gloucester, replaced by Joe Barakat.

Ulster entered the season with their home stadium, Ravenhill, redeveloped, with the stadium's capacity having been increased to 18,196, and renamed the Kingspan Stadium after its sponsor.

The Heineken Cup was reorganised as the European Rugby Champions Cup. Rather than three Irish provinces qualifying as of right, the top team from each country in the Pro12, and the top three in the league table other than those four qualified. Ulster qualified by league position, and finished third in their pool.

Ulster finished fourth in the Pro12, qualifying for the semi-finals and next season's Champions Cup. They lost the semi-final to Glasgow Warriors. Ulster led the league in scrums. Franco van der Merwe and wing Craig Gilroy made the Pro12 Dream Team, and Gilroy's try against Scarlets was named Try of the Year.

Scrum-half Ruan Pienaar was Ulster's top scorer in all competitions with 121 points. Craig Gilroy was top try scorer with twelve, and was named Ulster's Player of the Year.

Ulster's second team, the Ulster Ravens, competed in the British and Irish Cup, finishing third in their pool.

Prop Declan Fitzpatrick retired at the end of the season.

== Staff ==
Position	Name	Nationality
Director of Rugby	Les Kiss	Australia
Head Coach	Neil Doak	Ireland
Forwards Coach	Allen Clarke	Ireland
Defence Coach	Jonny Bell	Ireland
Team Manager	Bryn Cunningham	Ireland
Head of Strength & Conditioning	Jonny Davis	Ireland
Strength & Conditioning Coach	Kevin Geary	Ireland
Head of Physiotherapy	Gareth Robinson	Ireland
Physiotherapist	Alan McAldin	Ireland

== Squad ==
=== Senior squad ===
==== Players in ====
- (Ireland) Ross Adair from (Ireland) Ballynahinch
- (New Zealand) Tim Boys from (New Zealand) Southland
- (Ireland) Charlie Butterworth from (Ireland) Lansdowne
- (South Africa) Wiehahn Herbst from (South Africa) Sharks
- (Ireland) Ian Humphreys from (England) London Irish
- (South Africa) Louis Ludik from (France) Agen
- (Ireland) Ruaidhrí Murphy from (Australia) Brumbies
- (New Zealand) Sean Reidy from (New Zealand) Counties Manukau
- (Ireland) Clive Ross from (Ireland) Lansdowne
- (Ireland) Dave Ryan from (Italy) Zebre
- (Samoa) Michael Stanley from (New Zealand) Counties Manukau
- (South Africa) Franco van der Merwe from (South Africa) Lions

==== Promoted from academy ====
- (Ireland) Conor Joyce
- (Ireland) Kyle McCall
- (Ireland) Stuart McCloskey
- (Ireland) Peter Nelson
- (Ireland) Bronson Ross
- (Ireland) Rory Scholes
- (Ireland) James Simpson
- (Ireland) Andrew Warwick

==== Players out ====
- (New Zealand) John Afoa to (England) Gloucester
- (Ireland) Niall Annett to (England) Worcester Warriors
- (Ireland) Chris Cochrane retired
- (Ireland) Tom Court to (England) London Irish
- (Australia) Sean Doyle to (Australia) Brumbies
- (Ireland) Chris Farrell to (France) Grenoble
- (Ireland) Stephen Ferris retired
- (Ireland) Adam Macklin to (England) Rotherham Titans
- (Ireland) Paddy McAllister to (France) Aurillac
- (Ireland) David McIlwaine to (England) Yorkshire Carnegie
- (Ireland) James McKinney to (England) Rotherham Titans
- (South Africa) Johann Muller retired
- (Ireland) Ian Porter to (Ireland) Connacht
- (Ireland) Paddy Wallace retired

== Squad ==
Ulster Rugby squad
**Props**: (South Africa) Wiehahn Herbst* (24 apps, 23 starts, 5 pts); (Ireland) Callum Black (26 apps, 20 starts); (Ireland) Andrew Warwick (22 apps, 8 starts, 5 pts); (Ireland) **Declan Fitzpatrick** (12 apps, 3 starts, 5 pts); (Ireland) Ricky Lutton (2 apps, 2 starts); (New Zealand) Bronson Ross* (20 apps, 1 start); (Ireland) Ruaidhrí Murphy (3 apps, 1 start); (Ireland) Kyle McCall (1 app); (Ireland) Dave Ryan (no apps); **Hookers**: (Ireland) **Rory Best** (c) (18 apps, 17 starts, 15 pts); (Ireland) **Rob Herring** (23 apps, 12 starts, 5 pts); (Ireland) John Andrew (2 apps); **Locks**: (South Africa) **Franco van der Merwe** (27 apps, 26 starts, 15 pts); (Ireland) **Dan Tuohy** (12 apps, 12 starts, 15 pts); (Ireland) Lewis Stevenson (18 apps, 8 starts); (Ireland) **Iain Henderson** (9 apps, 8 starts, 5 pts); (Ireland) Alan O'Connor (11 apps, 6 starts); (Ireland) Neil McComb (4 apps, 1 start); (Ireland) Charlie Butterworth (no apps); (Ireland) James Simpson (no apps)	**Back row**: (Ireland) **Roger Wilson** (27 apps, 22 starts); (Ireland) **Robbie Diack** (24 apps, 20 starts, 5 pts); (Ireland) Clive Ross (18 apps, 13 starts); (New Zealand) Nick Williams (16 apps, 13 starts, 15 pts); (Ireland) **Chris Henry** (13 apps, 12 starts, 10 pts); (Ireland) Mike McComish (6 apps, 4 starts, 10 pts); (New Zealand) Sean Reidy* (8 apps, 3 starts); (New Zealand) Tim Boys (no apps); (Ireland) Conor Joyce (no apps); **Scrum-halves**: (South Africa) **Ruan Pienaar** (17 apps, 16 starts, 121 pts); (Ireland) **Paul Marshall** (20 apps, 12 starts, 10 pts); (Ireland) Michael Heaney (8 apps, 1 start); **Fly-halves**: (Ireland) **Paddy Jackson** (17 apps, 16 starts, 94 pts); (Ireland) Ian Humphreys (21 apps, 13 starts, 92 pts)	**Centres**: (Ireland) **Darren Cave** (26 apps, 23 starts, 40 pts); (Ireland) **Stuart Olding** (17 apps, 12 starts, 12 pts); (Ireland) **Jared Payne** (12 apps, 11 starts, 5 pts); (Ireland) Stuart McCloskey (15 apps, 9 starts, 5 pts); (Ireland) **Luke Marshall** (11 apps, 6 starts, 5 pts); (Ireland) Sammy Arnold (2 apps, 1 start); (New Zealand) Michael Stanley (2 apps, 1 start); **Wings**: (Ireland) **Craig Gilroy** (23 apps, 21 starts, 65 pts); (Ireland) **Tommy Bowe** (17 apps, 16 starts, 40 pts); (Ireland) Michael Allen (11 apps, 10 starts, 5 pts); (Ireland) **Andrew Trimble** (6 apps, 4 starts, 20 pts); (Ireland) Rory Scholes (4 apps, 2 starts); (Ireland) Ross Adair (1 app, 5 pts); **Fullbacks**: (South Africa) Louis Ludik* (25 apps, 24 starts, 20 pts); (Ireland) Peter Nelson (8 apps, 4 starts); (Ireland) Ricky Andrew (3 apps, 1 start)
(c) denotes the team captain, **Bold** denotes internationally capped players. Italics denotes academy players who appeared in the senior team.^{*} denotes players qualified to play for Ireland on residency or dual nationality. Players and their allocated positions from the Ulster Rugby website.

=== Academy squad ===
==== Players in ====
- (Ireland) Jacob Stockdale from (Ireland) Wallace High School
- (Ireland) Sammy Arnold
- (Ireland) Jack Owens
- (Ireland) David Busby
- (Ireland) Michael Lagan
- (Ireland) Craig Trenier
- (Ireland) Paul Jackson
- (Ireland) Alex Thompson
- (Ireland) Joshua Atkinson
- (Ireland) Lorcan Dow
- (Ireland) Frank Taggart
- (Ireland) Connor Young
- (Ireland) Sean O'Hagan

==== Players out ====
- (Ireland) Jack Caulfield

Position	Name	Nationality
Elite Performance Development Manager	Allen Clarke	Ireland
Representative Team Performance Manager	Michael Black	Ireland
Academy Schools Coach	Brian McLaughlin	Ireland
Strength & Conditioning Coach	David Drake	Ireland
Strength & Conditioning Coach	Amy Davis	Ireland
Sub-Academy Fitness Coach	Matthew Maguire	Ireland
Physiotherapist	David Minion	Ireland

Ulster Rugby Academy squad
**Props**: (Ireland) Michael Lagan **(1)**; (Ireland) Craig Trenier **(1)**; **Hookers**: (Ireland) John Andrew **(2)**; (Ireland) Paul Jackson **(1)**; (Ireland) Jonny Murphy **(4)**; **Locks**: (Ireland) John Donnan **(2)**; (Ireland) Alan O'Connor **(3)**; (Ireland) Alex Thompson **(1)**	**Back row**: (Ireland) Joshua Atkinson **(1)**; (Ireland) Lorcan Dow **(1)**; (Ireland) Frank Taggart **(1)**; **Scrum-halves**: (Ireland) David Shanahan **(2)**; (Ireland) Connor Young **(1)**; **Fly-halves**: (Ireland) Sean O'Hagan **(1)**	**Centres**: (Ireland) Sammy Arnold **(1)**; (Ireland) Jacob Stockdale **(1)**; **Back three**: (Ireland) Jack Owens **(1)**; (Ireland) David Busby **(1)**
(c) denotes the team captain, **Bold** denotes internationally capped players, number in brackets indicates players stage in the three-year academy cycle.^{*} denotes players qualified to play for Ireland on residency or dual nationality. Players and their allocated positions from the Ulster Rugby website.

== Season record ==
Competition	Played	Won	Drawn	Lost	PF	PA	PD	TF	TA
2014-15 Champions Cup	6	2	0	4	116	146	-30	16	15
2014-15 Pro12	23	14	2	7	538	388	150	60	35
Total	29	16	2	11	654	534	120	76	50

== European Rugby Champions Cup ==
=== Pool 3 ===
Team	P	W	D	L	PF	PA	Diff	TF	TA	TB	LB	Pts
(France) Toulon (2)	6	5	0	1	181	89	+92	19	9	1	1	22
(England) Leicester Tigers	6	3	0	3	108	126	−18	12	15	1	0	13
(Ireland) Ulster	6	2	0	4	116	146	−30	16	15	3	1	12
(Wales) Scarlets	6	2	0	4	90	134	−44	8	16	0	0	8

18 October 2014	Leicester Tigers (England)	25–18	(Ireland) Ulster (1 BP)	Welford Road, Leicester
19:45	Try: O. Williams 15' c Kitchener 28' m Burns 31' c Con: Burns (1/2) 16'; O. Williams (1/1) 33'; Pen: O. Williams (2/2) 44', 62'	Report	Try: Bowe 55'c Van der Merwe 66' m Con: Jackson (1/2) 56'; Pen: Jackson (2/3) 8', 48'; Cards: Gilroy (yellow card) 30'	Attendance: 19,943; Referee: Romain Poite (FFR)
Ulster lineup: 1. Andrew Warwick, 2. Rory Best (c), 3. Wiehahn Herbst, 4. Lewis Stevenson, 5. Franco van der Merwe, 6. Robbie Diack, 7. Chris Henry, 8. Nick Williams, 9. Paul Marshall, 10. Paddy Jackson, 11. Craig Gilroy, 12. Stuart McCloskey, 13. Jared Payne, 14. Tommy Bowe, 15. Louis Ludik.; Replacements: 16. Rob Herring, 17. Callum Black, 18. Declan Fitzpatrick (for Herbst 76'), 19. Clive Ross (for Stevenson 76'), 20. Roger Wilson (for Williams 56'), 21. Michael Heaney (for P. Marshall 74'), 22. Stuart Olding (for McCloskey 56'), 23. Darren Cave.				Attendance: 19,943; Referee: Romain Poite (FFR)

25 October 2014	Ulster (Ireland)	13–23	(France) Toulon	Ravenhill Stadium, Belfast
13:00	Try: Gilroy 77' c Con: Jackson (1/1) 77'; Pen: Jackson (2/2) 21', 46'	Report; Highlights	Try: Habana 40' c D. Armitage 58' c Con: Halfpenny (2/2) 40', 59'; Pen: Halfpenny (3/5) 9', 13', 39'; Cards: Habana (yellow card) 79'	Attendance: 16,931; Referee: Wayne Barnes (RFU)
Ulster lineup: 1. Andrew Warwick, 2. Rory Best (c), 3. Wiehahn Herbst, 4. Lewis Stevenson, 5. Franco van der Merwe, 6. Robbie Diack, 7. Chris Henry, 8. Roger Wilson, 9. Paul Marshall, 10. Paddy Jackson, 11. Craig Gilroy, 12. Stuart Olding, 13. Jared Payne, 14. Tommy Bowe, 15. Louis Ludik.; Replacements: 16. Rob Herring (for Best 77'), 17. Callum Black (for Warwick 54'), 18. Declan Fitzpatrick (for Herbst 70'), 19. Clive Ross (for Wilson 77'), 20. Nick Williams (for Stevenson 54'), 21. Michael Heaney (for P. Marshall 79'), 22. Ian Humphreys (for Ludik 67'), 23. Darren Cave (for Olding 49').				Attendance: 16,931; Referee: Wayne Barnes (RFU)

6 December 2014	(1 BP) Ulster (Ireland)	24–9	(Wales) Scarlets	Ravenhill Stadium, Belfast
19:45	Try: Cave 14' c Pienaar 18' c Bowe 59' m Best 68' m Con: Humphreys (2/4) 15', 19'; Cards: Pienaar (yellow card) 74'	Report	Pen: Priestland (3/4) 3', 29', 55'; Cards: Davies (yellow card) 12'; Williams (yellow card) 35'	Attendance: 15,946; Referee: Luke Pearce (RFU)
Ulster lineup: 1. Callum Black, 2. Rory Best (c), 3. Wiehahn Herbst, 4. Dan Tuohy, 5. Franco van der Merwe, 6. Robbie Diack, 7. Roger Wilson, 8. Nick Williams, 9. Ruan Pienaar, 10. Ian Humphreys, 11. Craig Gilroy, 12. Stuart Olding, 13. Darren Cave, 14. Tommy Bowe, 15. Louis Ludik.; Replacements: 16. Rob Herring (for Best 77'), 17. Andrew Warwick (for Black 78'), 18. Declan Fitzpatrick (for Herbst 48'), 19. Alan O'Connor (for Van der Merwe 48'), 20. Clive Ross (for Williams 66'), 21. Paul Marshall (for Diack 77'), 22. Stuart McCloskey, 23. Michael Allen.				Attendance: 15,946; Referee: Luke Pearce (RFU)

14 December 2014	Scarlets (Wales)	22–13	(Ireland) Ulster	Parc y Scarlets, Llanelli
17:15	Try: J. Davies 78' c Con: Priestland (1/1) 79'; Pen: Priestland (5/8) 11', 19', 28', 33', 60'	Report	Try: Cave 41' c Con: Humphreys (1/1) 42'; Pen: Pienaar (2/3) 69', 72'; Cards: Fitzpatrick (yellow card) 63'	Attendance: 7,230; Referee: JP Doyle (RFU)
Ulster lineup: 1. Callum Black, 2. Rory Best (c), 3. Declan Fitzpatrick, 4. Dan Tuohy, 5. Franco van der Merwe, 6. Robbie Diack, 7. Clive Ross, 8. Roger Wilson, 9. Ruan Pienaar, 10. Ian Humphreys, 11. Craig Gilroy, 12. Luke Marshall, 13. Darren Cave, 14. Tommy Bowe, 15. Louis Ludik.; Replacements: 16. Rob Herring, 17. Andrew Warwick, 18. Bronson Ross (for C. Ross 67'), 19. Alan O'Connor, 20. Mike McComish, 21. Paul Marshall, 22. Michael Heaney, 23. Michael Allen.				Attendance: 7,230; Referee: JP Doyle (RFU)

17 January 2015	(1 BP) Toulon (France)	60–22	(Ireland) Ulster (1 BP)	Stade Mayol, Toulon
16:15	Try: Sánchez 2' c Habana 31' c Bastareaud 36' c Castrogiovanni 49' c S. Armitage (3) 57' c, 64' c, 78' m Gorgodze 59' c Con: Halfpenny (7/8) 3', 32', 37', 51', 58', 60', 65'; Pen: Halfpenny (2/2) 9', 18'	Report; Highlights	Try: Jackson 11' m McComish (2) 21' m, 76' c Payne 68' m Con: Pienaar (1/2) 77'	Attendance: 13,781; Referee: Leighton Hodges (WRU)
Ulster lineup: 1. Andrew Warwick, 2. Rob Herring, 3. Bronson Ross, 4. Alan O'Connor, 5. Franco van der Merwe, 6. Clive Ross, 7. Mike McComish, 8. Roger Wilson (c), 9. Ruan Pienaar, 10. Paddy Jackson, 11. Michael Allen, 12. Stuart Olding, 13. Darren Cave, 14. Louis Ludik, 15. Jared Payne.; Replacements: 16. John Andrew (for Herring 72'), 17. Callum Black (for Warwick 64'), 18. Declan Fitzpatrick, (for B. Ross 52'); 19. Lewis Stevenson (for Van der Merwe 61'), 20. Robbie Diack (for Wilson 52'), 21. Paul Marshall (for Jackson 32'), 22. Ian Humphreys (for Ludik 23'), 23. Michael Heaney (for Olding 45').				Attendance: 13,781; Referee: Leighton Hodges (WRU)

24 January 2015	(1 BP) Ulster (Ireland)	26–7	(England) Leicester Tigers	Ravenhill Stadium, Belfast
17:30	Try: Cave (3) 19' m, 38' c, 42' c, Gilroy 49' c Con: Pienaar (3/4) 38', 44', 51'; Cards: Black (yellow card) 61'; Herbst (yellow card) 71'	Report	Try: Thompstone 53' c Con: Burns (1/1) 54'; Cards: Goneva (yellow card) 45'	Attendance: 15,659; Referee: Pascal Gaüzère (FFR)
Ulster lineup: 1. Callum Black, 2. Rory Best (c), 3. Wiehahn Herbst, 4. Alan O'Connor, 5. Franco van der Merwe, 6. Iain Henderson, 7. Mike McComish, 8. Roger Wilson, 9. Ruan Pienaar, 10. Ian Humphreys, 11. Craig Gilroy, 12. Luke Marshall, 13. Darren Cave, 14. Tommy Bowe, 15. Jared Payne.; Replacements: 16. Rob Herring (for Best 74'), 17. Andrew Warwick (for Black 61'), 18. Bronson Ross (for McComish 45'); 19. Lewis Stevenson (for O'Connor 65'), 20. Clive Ross, 21. Neil McComb (for Henderson 58-61'), 22. Paul Marshall, 23. Michael Allen.				Attendance: 15,659; Referee: Pascal Gaüzère (FFR)

== Pro12 ==
Pro12 Table
	Team	Played	Won	Drawn	Lost	Points For	Points Against	Points Difference	Tries For	Tries Against	Try Bonus	Losing Bonus	Points
1	(Scotland) Glasgow Warriors (CH)	22	16	1	5	540	360	+180	63	33	9	0	75
2	(Ireland) Munster (RU)	22	15	2	5	581	367	+214	68	31	8	3	75
3	(Wales) Ospreys (SF)	22	16	1	5	546	358	+188	53	30	6	2	74
4	(Ireland) Ulster (SF)	22	14	2	6	524	372	+152	59	34	6	3	69
5	(Ireland) Leinster	22	11	3	8	483	375	+108	54	39	8	4	62
6	(Wales) Scarlets	22	11	3	8	452	388	+64	43	39	4	3	57
7	(Ireland) Connacht	22	10	1	11	447	419	+28	49	48	3	5	50
8	(Scotland) Edinburgh	22	10	1	11	399	419	−20	41	48	3	3	48
9	(Wales) Newport Gwent Dragons	22	8	0	14	393	484	−91	38	55	4	6	42
10	(Wales) Cardiff Blues	22	7	1	14	430	545	−115	46	57	3	2	35
11	(Italy) Benetton Treviso	22	3	1	18	306	641	−335	34	81	2	3	19
12	(Italy) Zebre	22	3	0	19	266	639	−373	27	80	0	3	15
If teams are level at any stage, tiebreakers are applied in the following order: 1. number of matches won; 2. the difference between points for and points against; 3. the number of tries scored; 4. the most points scored; 5. the difference between tries for and tries against; 6. the fewest red cards received; 7. the fewest yellow cards received.
Green background (rows 1 to 4) are play-off places, and earn a place in the 2015–16 European Rugby Champions Cup. Blue background indicates teams outside the play-off places, that earn a place in the European Rugby Champions Cup. The top team from each country will qualify. Yellow background indicates the team that advances to a play-off semi-final against Aviva Premiership side Gloucester, who qualified for the play-off as the 2014–15 European Rugby Challenge Cup winners. Plain background indicates teams that earn a place in the 2015–16 European Rugby Challenge Cup.

6 September 2014	(1 BP) Scarlets (Wales)	32–32	(Ireland) Ulster (1 BP)	Parc y Scarlets, Llanelli
14:40	Try: Robinson 1' c Pitman 25' c G. Davies (2) 38' c, 63' m Con: Priestland (3/4); Pen: Priestland (2/2) 11', 45'	Report	Try: Van der Merwe 8' c Tuohy 13' m Ludik 67' c Trimble 78' c Con: Humphreys (3/4); Pen: Humphreys (2/2) 30', 48'; Cards: Tuohy (yellow card)	Attendance: 6,531; Referee: Peter Fitzgibbon (IRFU)
Ulster lineup: 1. Callum Black, 2. Rob Herring, 3. Wiehahn Herbst, 4. Dan Tuohy, 5. Franco van der Merwe, 6. Robbie Diack, 7. Chris Henry, 8. Roger Wilson, 9. Paul Marshall, 10. Ian Humphreys, 11. Craig Gilroy, 12. Stuart Olding, 13. Jared Payne, 14. Michael Allen, 15. Louis Ludik.; Replacements: 16. John Andrew, 17. Andrew Warwick (for Black), 18. Declan Fitzpatrick (for Herbst), 19. Lewis Stevenson (for Van der Merwe), 20. Nick Williams (for Wilson), 21. Michael Heaney (for P. Marshall), 22. Luke Marshall (for Payne), 23. Andrew Trimble (for Allen).				Attendance: 6,531; Referee: Peter Fitzgibbon (IRFU)

12 September 2014	(1 BP) Ulster (Ireland)	33–13	(Italy) Zebre	Ravenhill Stadium, Belfast
19:35	Try: Williams 4' c Gilroy 16' c Diack 26' m Trimble 59' c Tuohy 65' c Con: Humphreys (4/5); Cards: R. Andrew (yellow card)	Report; Man of the Match: Andrew Trimble	Try: Vunisa 7' c Con: Haimona (1/1); Pen: Haimona (2/3) 11', 70'	Attendance: 13,835; Referee: Leighton Hodges (WRU)
Ulster lineup: 1. Andrew Warwick, 2. Rory Best, 3. Wiehahn Herbst, 4. Lewis Stevenson, 5. Dan Tuohy, 6. Robbie Diack, 7. Chris Henry, 8. Nick Williams, 9. Paul Marshall, 10. Ian Humphreys, 11. Craig Gilroy, 12. Luke Marshall, 13. Darren Cave, 14. Andrew Trimble, 15. Rick Andrew.; Replacements: 16. Rob Herring (for Best), 17. Ruaidhri Murphy (for Warwick), 18. Bronson Ross (for Herbst), 19. Franco van der Merwe (for Stevenson), 20. Roger Wilson (for Henry), 21. Michael Heaney (for P. Marshall), 22. Stuart Olding (for L. Marshall), 23. Louis Ludik (for Cave).				Attendance: 13,835; Referee: Leighton Hodges (WRU)

19 September 2014	Cardiff Blues (Wales)	9–26	(Ireland) Ulster	Cardiff Arms Park
19:35	Pen: Patchell (3/4) 21', 27', 35'	Report; Man of the Match: Rory Best	Try: Tuohy 51' c Humphreys 74' c Con: Jackson (1/1); Humphreys (1/1); Pen: Jackson (4/5) 7', 29', 33', 40'	Attendance: 7,041; Referee: Neil Paterson (SRU)
Ulster lineup:<rr />: 1. Andrew Warwick, 2. Rory Best, 3. Wiehahn Herbst, 4. Dan Tuohy, 5. Franco van Der Merwe, 6. Robbie Diack, 7. Chris Henry, 8. Nick Williams, 9. Paul Marshall, 10. Paddy Jackson, 11. Tommy Bowe, 12. Stuart Olding, 13. Darren Cave, 14. Andrew Trimble, 15. Louis Ludik.; Replacements: 16. Rob Herring (for Best), 17. Callum Black (for Warwick), 18. Bronson Ross (for Herbst), 19. Neil McComb (for Tuohy), 20. Roger Wilson (for Williams), 21. Michael Heaney (for P. Marshall), 22. Ian Humphreys (for Jackson), 23. Craig Gilroy (for Cave).				Attendance: 7,041; Referee: Neil Paterson (SRU)

27 September 2014	Zebre (Italy)	13–6	(Ireland) Ulster (1 BP)	Stadio XXV Aprile, Parma
16:00	Try: Chistolini 44' c Con: Haimona (1/1); Pen: Haimona (1/1) 68'; Drop: Haimona (1/1) 72'; Cards: Fabiani (yellow card)	Report	Pen: Humphreys (2/2) 50', 53'	Attendance: 2,269; Referee: Dudley Phillips (IRFU)
Ulster lineup: 1. Callum Black, 2. Rob Herring, 3. Declan Fitzpatrick, 4. Neil McComb, 5. Franco van Der Merwe, 6. Roger Wilson, 7. Clive Ross, 8. Nick Williams, 9. Michael Heaney, 10. Paddy Jackson, 11. Michael Allen, 12. Stuart McCloskey, 13. Darren Cave, 14. Tommy Bowe, 15. Craig Gilroy.; Replacements: 16. Rory Best (for Herring), 17. Ruaidhri Murphy (for Black), 18. Wiehahn Herbst (for Fitzpatrick), 19. Lewis Stevenson (for McComb), 20. Mike McComish (for Williams), 21. Paul Marshall (for Heaney), 22. Ian Humphreys (for Jackson), 23. Andrew Trimble (for McCloskey).				Attendance: 2,269; Referee: Dudley Phillips (IRFU)

3 October 2014	(1 BP) Ulster (Ireland)	30–0	(Scotland) Edinburgh	Ravenhill Stadium, Belfast
19:35	Try: Trimble (2) 25' c, 78' m Williams 61' m Best 68' c Con: Jackson (1/1); Olding (1/3); Pen: Jackson (2/3) 13', 39'	Report; Man of the Match: Stuart McCloskey	Cards: Coman (yellow card)	Attendance: 15,479; Referee: Claudio Blessano (FIR)
Ulster lineup: 1. Ruaidhri Murphy, 2. Rory Best, 3. Wiehahn Herbst, 4. Alan O'Connor, 5. Franco van Der Merwe, 6. Robbie Diack, 7. Chris Henry, 8. Roger Wilson, 9. Paul Marshall, 10. Paddy Jackson, 11. Tommy Bowe, 12. Stuart McCloskey, 13. Jared Payne, 14. Andrew Trimble, 15. Louis Ludik.; Replacements: 16. Rob Herring (for Best), 17. Andrew Warwick (for Murphy), 18. Bronson Ross (for Herbst), 19. Lewis Stevenson (for Van der Merwe), 20. Nick Williams (for Wilson), 21. Michael Heaney, 22. Stuart Olding (for Jackson), 23. Darren Cave (for Ludik).				Attendance: 15,479; Referee: Claudio Blessano (FIR)

11 October 2014	Ulster (Ireland)	29–9	(Scotland) Glasgow Warriors	Ravenhill Stadium, Belfast
17:05	Try: Gilroy 66' c Bowe 69' c Con: Humphreys (2/2); Pen: Humphreys (5/6) 10', 16', 21', 31', 36'	Report; Man of the Match: Rory Best	Pen: Russell (3/3) 7', 18', 43'; Cards: Nakarawa (yellow card)	Attendance: 16,260; Referee: Nigel Owens (WRU)
Ulster lineup: 1. Andrew Warwick, 2. Rory Best, 3. Wiehahn Herbst, 4. Alan O'Connor, 5. Franco van Der Merwe, 6. Robbie Diack, 7. Chris Henry, 8. Nick Williams, 9. Paul Marshall, 10. Ian Humphreys, 11. Tommy Bowe, 12. Stuart McCloskey, 13. Jared Payne, 14. Andrew Trimble, 15. Louis Ludik.; Replacements: 16. Rob Herring (for Best), 17. Callum Black (for Warwick), 18. Bronson Ross (for Herbst), 19. Lewis Stevenson (for Van der Merwe), 20. Roger Wilson (for Williams), 21. Michael Heaney, 22. Stuart Olding (for Trimble), 23. Darren Cave (for Ludik).				Attendance: 16,260; Referee: Nigel Owens (WRU)

1 November 2014	Ulster (Ireland)	23–6	(Wales) Newport Gwent Dragons	Ravenhill Stadium, Belfast
19:35	Try: Olding (2) 29' m, 46' m Fitzpatrick 80' c Con: Humphreys (1/1); Pen: Jackson (2/2) 25', 28'	Report; Man of the Match: Stuart Olding	Pen: O'Brien (2/2) 34', 59'	Attendance: 13,501; Referee: Matteo Liperini (FIR)
Ulster lineup: 1. Callum Black, 2. Rob Herring, 3. Wiehahn Herbst, 4. Lewis Stevenson, 5. Franco van Der Merwe, 6. Clive Ross, 7. Sean Reidy, 8. Roger Wilson, 9. Paul Marshall, 10. Paddy Jackson, 11. Peter Nelson, 12. Stuart McCloskey, 13. Darren Cave, 14. Louis Ludik, 15. Stuart Olding.; Replacements: 16. John Andrew, 17. Andrew Warwick, 18. Declan Fitzpatrick (for Herbst), 19. Neil McComb (for Stevenson), 20. Robbie Diack (for Wilson), 21. Michael Heaney (for P. Marshall), 22. Ian Humphreys (for McCloskey), 23. Ricky Andrew (for Ludik).				Attendance: 13,501; Referee: Matteo Liperini (FIR)

21 November 2014	Ulster (Ireland)	25–16	(Wales) Ospreys	Ravenhill Stadium, Belfast
19:35	Try: Cave (2) 9' c, 78' c Van der Merwe 39' m Con: Jackson (1/2); Humphreys (1/1); Pen: Jackson (2/2) 19, 31'	Report; Man of the Match: Darren Cave	Try: Roberts 43' c Con: Davies (1/1); Pen: Davies (3/3) 32', 59', 61'	Attendance: 16,923; Referee: Neil Hennessy (WRU)
Ulster lineup: 1. Callum Black, 2. Rob Herring, 3. Wiehahn Herbst, 4. Lewis Stevenson, 5. Franco van Der Merwe, 6. Clive Ross, 7. Sean Reidy, 8. Roger Wilson, 9. Paul Marshall, 10. Paddy Jackson, 11. Craig Gilroy, 12. Stuart McCloskey, 13. Darren Cave, 14. Louis Ludik, 15. Stuart Olding.; Replacements: 16. John Andrew, 17. Andrew Warwick (for Black), 18. Declan Fitzpatrick (for Herbst), 19. Alan O'Connor (for Stevenson), 20. Nick Williams (for C. Ross), 21. Michael Heaney, 22. Ian Humphreys (for Jackson), 23. Peter Nelson.				Attendance: 16,923; Referee: Neil Hennessy (WRU)

28 November 2014	Munster (Ireland)	21–20	(Ireland) Ulster (1 BP)	Thomond Park, Limerick
19:35	Try: Copeland 29' m Williams 43' c Con: Keatley (1/2); Pen: Keatley (3/5) 23', 51', 54'; Cards: Archer (yellow card)	Report	Try: Williams 79' m Pen: Humphreys (5/5) 2', 10', 12', 20', 71'	Attendance: 17,101; Referee: Ian Davies (WRU)
Ulster lineup: 1. Callum Black, 2. Rory Best, 3. Wiehahn Herbst, 4. Alan O'Connor, 5. Franco van Der Merwe, 6. Roger Wilson, 7. Sean Reidy, 8. Nick Williams, 9. Paul Marshall, 10. Ian Humphreys, 11. Craig Gilroy, 12. Stuart McCloskey, 13. Darren Cave, 14. Louis Ludik, 15. Stuart Olding.; Replacements: 16. Rob Herring (for Best), 17. Andrew Warwick (for Black), 18. Declan Fitzpatrick (for Herbst), 19. Lewis Stevenson (for O'Connor), 20. Robbie Diack (for Reidy), 21. Michael Heaney (for P. Marshall), 22. Michael Allen (for Ludik), 23. Peter Nelson (for Olding).				Attendance: 17,101; Referee: Ian Davies (WRU)

20 December 2014	(1 BP) Ospreys (Wales)	31–20	(Ireland) Ulster	Liberty Stadium, Swansea
17:15	Try: Biggar 17' c Webb (2) 36' c, 48' c Dirksen 55' c Con: Biggar (4/4); Pen: Biggar (1/1) 2'	Report	Try: Herring 59' c Bowe 67' c Con: Humphreys (2/2); Pen: Humphreys (2/2) 14', 43'	Attendance: 6,395; Referee: Neil Paterson (SRU)
Ulster lineup: 1. Andrew Warwick, 2. Rory Best, 3. Declan Fitzpatrick, 4. Dan Tuohy, 5. Franco van Der Merwe, 6. Robbie Diack, 7. Clive Ross, 8. Roger Wilson, 9. Ruan Pienaar, 10. Ian Humphreys, 11. Michael Allen, 12. Luke Marshall, 13. Darren Cave, 14. Tommy Bowe, 15. Louis Ludik.; Replacements: 16. Rob Herring (for Best), 17. Callum Black (for Warwick), 18. Bronson Ross (for Fitzpatrick), 19. Alan O'Connor (for Van der Merwe), 20. Sean Reidy (for Diack), 21. Paul Marshall (for Pienaar), 22. Stuart Olding (for L. Marshall), 23. Peter Nelson (for Cave).				Attendance: 6,395; Referee: Neil Paterson (SRU)

26 December 2014	Ulster (Ireland)	13–10	(Ireland) Connacht (1 BP)	Ravenhill Stadium, Belfast
18:45	Try: Gilroy 19' c Con: Jackson (1/1); Pen: Jackson (2/4) 14', 62'	Report; Man of the Match: Rob Herring	Try: Muldowney 66' c Con: Carty (1/1); Pen: Carty (1/1) 4'	Attendance: 17,107; Referee: John Lacey (IRFU)
Ulster lineup: 1. Callum Black, 2. Rob Herring, 3. Wiehahn Herbst, 4. Dan Tuohy, 5. Franco van Der Merwe, 6. Robbie Diack, 7. Clive Ross, 8. Roger Wilson, 9. Paul Marshall, 10. Paddy Jackson, 11. Peter Nelson, 12. Luke Marshall, 13. Darren Cave, 14. Craig Gilroy, 15. Louis Ludik.; Replacements: 16. John Andrew (for Herring), 17. Andrew Warwick, 18. Declan Fitzpatrick (for Herbst), 19. Alan O'Connor (for Van der Merwe), 20. Sean Reidy (for Diack), 21. Michael Heaney, 22. Ian Humphreys, 23. Stuart Olding.				Attendance: 17,107; Referee: John Lacey (IRFU)

3 January 2015	Leinster (Ireland)	24–11	(Ireland) Ulster	RDS Arena, Dublin
14:40	Try: Madigan 42' c Conan 79' m Con: Madigan (1/2); Pen: Madigan (4/4) 21', 31', 40', 60'	Report	Try: Herbst 49' m Pen: Pienaar (2/4) 16', 25'; Cards: Tuohy (yellow card)	Attendance: 18,200; Referee: Marius Mitrea (FIR)
Ulster lineup: 1. Callum Black, 2. Rory Best, 3. Wiehahn Herbst, 4. Dan Tuohy, 5. Franco van Der Merwe, 6. Robbie Diack, 7. Clive Ross, 8. Roger Wilson, 9. Ruan Pienaar, 10. Paddy Jackson, 11. Craig Gilroy, 12. Stuart Olding, 13. Darren Cave, 14. Tommy Bowe, 15. Peter Nelson.; Replacements: 16. Rob Herring (for Best), 17. Andrew Warwick (for Black), 18. Bronson Ross (for Herbst), 19. Alan O'Connor (for Van der Merwe), 20. Sean Reidy (for C. Ross), 21. Paul Marshall (for Pienaar), 22. Mike McComish, 23. Luke Marshall (for Bowe).				Attendance: 18,200; Referee: Marius Mitrea (FIR)

11 January 2015	(1 BP) Benetton Treviso (Italy)	20–24	(Ireland) Ulster	Stadio Comunale di Monigo, Treviso
15:00	Try: Christie 38' c Minto 56' c Con: Hayward (2/2); Pen: Hayward (2/2) 67', 72'	Report; Man of the Match: Ruan Pienaar	Try: Jackson 6' c Pienaar 22' c Bowe 25' c Con: Jackson (3/3); Pen: Jackson (1/1) 19'; Cards: Gilroy (yellow card)	Attendance: 3,108; Referee: Ben Whitehouse (WRU)
Ulster lineup: 1. Callum Black, 2. Rory Best, 3. Wiehahn Herbst, 4. Alan O'Connor, 5. Dan Tuohy, 6. Robbie Diack, 7. Clive Ross, 8. Roger Wilson, 9. Ruan Pienaar, 10. Paddy Jackson, 11. Craig Gilroy, 12. Stuart Olding, 13. Darren Cave, 14. Tommy Bowe, 15. Louis Ludik.; Replacements: 16. Rob Herring, 17. Andrew Warwick, 18. Bronson Ross (for Herbst), 19. Lewis Stevenson (for O'Connor), 20. Sean Reidy (for C. Ross), 21. Paul Marshall, 22. Jared Payne (for Cave), 23. Peter Nelson.				Attendance: 3,108; Referee: Ben Whitehouse (WRU)

13 February 2015	(1 BP) Ulster (Ireland)	43–3	(Italy) Benetton Treviso	Ravenhill Stadium, Belfast
19:35	Try: Allen 25' c Penalty try 60' c McCloskey 68' c Gilroy (2) 72' m, 77' c Warwick 75' c Con: Pienaar (5/6); Pen: Pienaar (1/2) 18'	Report	Pen: Carlisle (1/1) 66'; Cards: Pavanello (yellow card); Vallejos (yellow card)	Attendance: 15,518; Referee: Ian Davies (WRU)
Ulster lineup: 1. Callum Black, 2. Rob Herring, 3. Wiehahn Herbst, 4. Lewis Stevenson, 5. Franco van der Merwe, 6. Roger Wilson, 7. Mike McComish, 8. Nick Williams, 9. Ruan Pienaar, 10. Ian Humphreys, 11. Michael Allen, 12. Luke Marshall, 13. Darren Cave, 14. Craig Gilroy, 15. Louis Ludik.; Replacements: 16. John Andrew (for Herring), 17. Andrew Warwick (for Black), 18. Bronson Ross (for Herbst), 19. Robbie Diack (for Wilson), 20. Clive Ross (for Williams), 21. Paul Marshall (for Humphreys), 22. Stuart McCloskey (for L. Marshall), 23. Peter Nelson (for Ludik).				Attendance: 15,518; Referee: Ian Davies (WRU)

20 February 2015	(1 BP) Edinburgh (Scotland)	17–20	(Ireland) Ulster	Murrayfield Stadium, Edinburgh
19:35	Try: Burleigh 8' m Pen: Heathcote (4/9) 18', 29', 36', 64'	Report	Try: Pienaar 13' c Cave 51' c Con: Pienaar (2/2); Pen: Pienaar (2/2) 34', 48'; Cards: Van der Merwe (yellow card)	Attendance: 4,797; Referee: Leighton Hodges (WRU)
Ulster lineup: 1. Callum Black, 2. Rob Herring, 3. Wiehahn Herbst, 4. Iain Henderson, 5. Franco van der Merwe, 6. Roger Wilson, 7. Mike McComish, 8. Nick Williams, 9. Ruan Pienaar, 10. Ian Humphreys, 11. Michael Allen, 12. Stuart McCloskey, 13. Darren Cave, 14. Craig Gilroy, 15. Louis Ludik.; Replacements: 16. John Andrew, 17. Andrew Warwick, 18. Bronson Ross (for Herbst), 19. Lewis Stevenson (for Henderson), 20. Clive Ross (for McComish), 21. Paul Marshall (for Humphreys), 22. Luke Marshall (for Williams), 23. Peter Nelson (for Allen).				Attendance: 4,797; Referee: Leighton Hodges (WRU)

27 February 2015	Ulster (Ireland)	25–20	(Wales) Scarlets (1 BP)	Ravenhill Stadium, Belfast
19:35	Try: Gilroy 45' m L. Marshall 51' c Pienaar 58' c Con: Pienaar (2/3); Pen: Pienaar (2/3) 24', 31'	Report; Man of the Match: Roger Wilson	Try: Barclay 37' c K. Phillips 78' c Con: S. Shingler (2/2); Pen: S. Shingler (2/4) 12', 28'	Attendance: 17,138; Referee: Ben Whitehouse (WRU)
Ulster lineup: 1. Callum Black, 2. Rob Herring, 3. Wiehahn Herbst, 4. Dan Tuohy, 5. Franco van der Merwe, 6. Roger Wilson, 7. Clive Ross, 8. Nick Williams, 9. Ruan Pienaar, 10. Ian Humphreys, 11. Michael Allen, 12. Luke Marshall, 13. Darren Cave, 14. Craig Gilroy, 15. Louis Ludik.; Replacements: 16. John Andrew, 17. Andrew Warwick (for Black), 18. Bronson Ross (for Herbst), 19. Lewis Stevenson (for Tuohy), 20. Mike McComish (for C. Ross), 21. Paul Marshall, 22. Michael Stanley (for Humphreys), 23. Rory Scholes (for Allen).				Attendance: 17,138; Referee: Ben Whitehouse (WRU)

8 March 2015	Newport Gwent Dragons (Wales)	26–22	(Ireland) Ulster (1 BP)	Rodney Parade, Newport
16:00	Try: Buckley 54' m J. Evans 61' c Meyer 73' c Con: D. Jones (1/3); Pen: Prydie (2/4) 13', 26'; D. Jones (1/1) 50'	Report	Try: Gilroy (2) 21' m, 69' c Adair 79' c Con: Pienaar (2/3); Pen: Pienaar (1/2) 47'; Cards: Black (yellow card)	Attendance: 6,019; Referee: Dudley Phillips (IRFU)
Ulster lineup: 1. Callum Black, 2. Rob Herring, 3. Wiehahn Herbst, 4. Dan Tuohy, 5. Franco van der Merwe, 6. Iain Henderson, 7. Clive Ross, 8. Nick Williams, 9. Ruan Pienaar, 10. Ian Humphreys, 11. Michael Allen, 12. Michael Stanley, 13. Darren Cave, 14. Rory Scholes, 15. Craig Gilroy.; Replacements: 16. John Andrew, 17. Andrew Warwick (for Black), 18. Bronson Ross (for Herbst), 19. Lewis Stevenson (for Tuohy), 20. Robbie Diack (for Henderson), 21. Paul Marshall (for Humphreys), 22. Sammy Arnold (for Stanley), 23. Ross Adair (for Scholes).				Attendance: 6,019; Referee: Dudley Phillips (IRFU)

27 March 2015	(1 BP) Ulster (Ireland)	36–17	(Wales) Cardiff Blues	Ravenhill Stadium, Belfast
19:35	Try: Gilroy 2' c Ludik (2) 17' m, 72' m P. Marshall 76' c Con: Pienaar (1/2); Humphreys (1/2); Pen: Pienaar (4/4) 14', 30', 41', 65'; Cards: Van der Merwe (yellow card); Williams (yellow card)	Report; Man of the Match: Paddy Jackson	Try: Isaacs 52' c Cuthbert 61' c Con: Anscombe (2/2); Pen: Anscombe (1/1) 45'	Attendance: 16,413; Referee: Marius Mitrea (FIR)
Ulster lineup: 1. Callum Black, 2. Rob Herring, 3. Wiehahn Herbst, 4. Dan Tuohy, 5. Franco van der Merwe, 6. Iain Henderson, 7. Clive Ross, 8. Nick Williams, 9. Ruan Pienaar, 10. Paddy Jackson, 11. Michael Allen, 12. Stuart Olding, 13. Darren Cave, 14. Craig Gilroy, 15. Louis Ludik.; Replacements: 16. John Andrew, 17. Andrew Warwick (for Black), 18. Bronson Ross (for Herbst), 19. Robbie Diack (for Tuohy), 20. Chris Henry (for C. Ross), 21. Paul Marshall (for Pienaar), 22. Ian Humphreys (for Olding), 23. Rory Scholes (for Allen).				Attendance: 16,413; Referee: Marius Mitrea (FIR)

11 April 2015	(1 BP) Connacht (Ireland)	20–27	(Ireland) Ulster (1 BP)	The Sportsground, Galway
14:40	Try: Healy 44' c O'Halloran 70' c Con: Nikora (1/1); Carty (1/1); Pen: Nikora (1/1) 51'; Carty (1/1) 62'	Report; Man of the Match: Franco van der Merwe	Try: Ludik 4' m Bowe (2) 31' m, 56' m Gilroy 34' c Best 64' m Con: Pienaar (1/5)	Attendance: 5,921; Referee: Nigel Owens (WRU)
Ulster lineup: 1. Callum Black, 2. Rory Best, 3. Wiehahn Herbst, 4. Dan Tuohy, 5. Franco van der Merwe, 6. Iain Henderson, 7. Chris Henry, 8. Roger Wilson, 9. Ruan Pienaar, 10. Paddy Jackson, 11. Craig Gilroy, 12. Darren Cave, 13. Jared Payne, 14. Tommy Bowe, 15. Louis Ludik.; Replacements: 16. Rob Herring, 17. Andrew Warwick (for Black), 18. Bronson Ross (for Herbst), 19. Robbie Diack (for Henderson), 20. Clive Ross, 21. Paul Marshall, 22. Ian Humphreys (for Ludik), 23. Stuart McCloskey (for Cave).				Attendance: 5,921; Referee: Nigel Owens (WRU)

24 April 2015	Ulster (Ireland)	26–10	(Ireland) Leinster	Ravenhill Stadium, Belfast
19:35	Try: Henderson 12' c Gilroy 72' c Con: Pienaar (2/2); Pen: Pienaar (4/6) 16', 38', 64', 66'; Cards: Warwick (yellow card)	Report; Man of the Match: Iain Henderson	Try: Te'o 6' c Con: Gopperth (1/1); Pen: Gopperth (1/1) 4'; Cards: Kearney (yellow card); O'Brien (yellow card)	Attendance: 17,097; Referee: John Lacey (IRFU)
Ulster lineup: 1. Callum Black, 2. Rory Best, 3. Wiehahn Herbst, 4. Dan Tuohy, 5. Franco van der Merwe, 6. Iain Henderson, 7. Chris Henry, 8. Roger Wilson, 9. Ruan Pienaar, 10. Paddy Jackson, 11. Craig Gilroy, 12. Darren Cave, 13. Jared Payne, 14. Tommy Bowe, 15. Louis Ludik.; Replacements: 16. Rob Herring, 17. Andrew Warwick (for Black 70'), 18. Bronson Ross (for Herbst 70'), 19. Robbie Diack (for Tuohy 65'), 20. Clive Ross, 21. Paul Marshall, 22. Ian Humphreys, 23. Stuart McCloskey (for Cave 51').				Attendance: 17,097; Referee: John Lacey (IRFU)

9 May 2015	Ulster (Ireland)	23–23	(Ireland) Munster	Ravenhill Stadium, Belfast
14:40	Try: Bowe 40' c P. Marshall 80' c Con: Jackson (2/2); Pen: Jackson (3/3) 39', 44', 70'; Cards: Henderson (red card)	Report	Try: Earls 76' m Pen: Keatley (6/6) 4', 31', 36', 54', 60', 68'	Attendance: 17,139; Referee: Nigel Owens (WRU)
Ulster lineup: 1. Callum Black, 2. Rory Best, 3. Wiehahn Herbst, 4. Dan Tuohy, 5. Franco van der Merwe, 6. Iain Henderson, 7. Chris Henry, 8. Roger Wilson, 9. Ruan Pienaar, 10. Paddy Jackson, 11. Peter Nelson, 12. Darren Cave, 13. Jared Payne, 14. Tommy Bowe, 15. Louis Ludik.; Replacements: 16. Rob Herring, 17. Andrew Warwick, 18. Bronson Ross, 19. Robbie Diack (for Wilson 29'), 20. Clive Ross, 21. Paul Marshall, 22. Ian Humphreys, 23. Stuart McCloskey (for Cave 55').				Attendance: 17,139; Referee: Nigel Owens (WRU)

16 May 2015	(1 BP) Glasgow Warriors (Scotland)	32–10	(Ireland) Ulster	Scotstoun Stadium, Glasgow
15:00	Try: Hogg 54' m Russell (2) 59' c, 69' c Vernon 72' c Con: Russell (3/4); Pen: Russell (2/2) 5', 34'; Cards: Gray (yellow card)	Report	Try: Henry 28' c Con: Humphreys (1/1) 29'; Pen: Humphreys (1/1) 36'; Cards: Warwick (yellow card)	Attendance: 10,000; Referee: Ian Davies (WRU)
Ulster lineup: 1. Andrew Warwick, 2. Rob Herring, 3. Ricky Lutton, 4. Lewis Stevenson, 5. Franco van der Merwe, 6. Clive Ross, 7. Chris Henry, 8. Robbie Diack, 9. Paul Marshall, 10. Ian Humphreys, 11. Michael Allen, 12. Stuart McCloskey, 13. Sammy Arnold, 14. Rory Scholes, 15. Louis Ludik.; Replacements: 16. Rory Best, 17. Kyle McCall, 18. Bronson Ross (for Lutton), 19. Iain Henderson (for Van der Merwe), 20. Roger Wilson, 21. Ruan Pienaar, 22. Paddy Jackson (for Humphreys), 23. Tommy Bowe (for Allen).				Attendance: 10,000; Referee: Ian Davies (WRU)

=== Semi-final ===
22 May 2015	Glasgow Warriors (Scotland)	16–14	(Ireland) Ulster	Scotstoun Stadium, Glasgow
19:45	Try: Van der Merwe 75' c Con: Russell (1/1); Pen: Russell (2/2) 5', 60'; Hogg (1/2) 13'	Report	Try: Henry 18' m Pen: Pienaar (3/3) 1', 55', 66'	Attendance: 10,000; Referee: George Clancy (IRFU)
Ulster lineup: 1. Callum Black, 2. Rory Best, 3. Ricky Lutton, 4. Lewis Stevenson, 5. Dan Tuohy, 6. Iain Henderson, 7. Chris Henry, 8. Roger Wilson, 9. Ruan Pienaar, 10. Paddy Jackson, 11. Craig Gilroy, 12. Darren Cave, 13. Jared Payne, 14. Tommy Bowe, 15. Louis Ludik.; Replacements: 16. Rob Herring, 17. Andrew Warwick (for Black), 18. Bronson Ross, 19. Robbie Diack (for Stevenson), 20. Sean Reidy (for Henry), 21. Paul Marshall, 22. Stuart McCloskey (for Cave), 23. Michael Allen.				Attendance: 10,000; Referee: George Clancy (IRFU)

=== End of season awards ===
Wing Craig Gilroy and lock Franco van der Merwe made the Pro12 Dream Team.

== Home attendance ==
Domestic League					European Cup					Total	
League	Fixtures	Average Attendance	Highest	Lowest	League	Fixtures	Average Attendance	Highest	Lowest	Total Attendance	Average Attendance
2014–15 Pro12	11	16,037	17,139	13,501	2014–15 European Rugby Champions Cup	3	16,179	16,931	15,659	224,946	16,068

== Friendly ==
22 August 2014	Ulster (Ireland)	22-21	(England) Exeter Chiefs	Ravenhill Stadium, Belfast
	Try: Scholes (2); Ludik; Con: Humphreys (3)	Report	Try: Jess (2); Sweeney; Con: Steenson (2); Pen: Steenson
Ulster lineup: 1. Callum Black, 2. John Andrew, 3. Declan Fitzpatrick, 4. Alan O'Connor, 5. Franco van der Merwe, 6. Charlie Butterworth, 7. Sean Reidy, 8. Roger Wilson (c), 9. Paul Marshall, 10. Ian Humphreys, 11. Jacob Stockdale, 12. Michael Allen, 13. Louis Ludik, 14. Rory Scholes, 15. Ricky Andrew.; Replacements: Kyle McCall, Jonny Murphy, Andrew Warwick, Ruaidhri Murphy, Bronson Ross, Wiehahn Herbst, Lewis Stevenson, Neil McComb, James Simpson, Conor Joyce, Clive Ross, Mike McComish, Frank Taggart, Josh Atkinson, Michael Heaney, David Shanahan, Ross Adair, Jack Owens, Sean O'Hagan.

31 August 2014	Leinster (Ireland)	7-10	(Ireland) Ulster	Tallaght Stadium, Dublin
	Try: B. Byrne; Con: Madigan	Report	Try: Payne; Con: Humphreys; Pen: Humphreys
Ulster lineup: 1. Andrew Warwick, 2. Rob Herring, 3. Wiehahn Herbst, 4. Dan Tohy, 5. Franco van der Merwe, 6. Robbie Diack, 7. Sean Reidy, 8. Roger Wilson, 9. Paul Marshall, 10. Ian Humphreys, 11. Craig Gilroy, 12. Stuart Olding, 13. Jared Payne, 14. Michael Allen, 15. Louis Ludik.; Replacements: Rory Scholes (for Allen 18-26', for Olding 38'), Declan Fitzpatrick (for Herbst 36'), Ricky Andrew (for Ludik 40'), Nick Willians (for Wilson 40'), Sean O'Hagan (for Humphreys 49'), Jacob Stockdale (for Allen 52'), Alan O'Connor (for Van der Merwe 52'), Clive Ross (for Reidy 55'), John Andrew (for Warwick 63'), Neil McComb (for Tuohy 63'), Michael Heaney (for P. Marshall 67'), Callum Black (for Herring 67'), Bronson Ross (for Fitzpatrick 67'), Lewis Stevenson (for McComb 67'), Mike McComish (for Diack 71'), Conor Joyce (for Ross 71'), Kyle McCall (for Williams 72').

== Ulster Women ==
=== 2014-15 Women's Interprovincial Series ===
	Team	P	W	D	L	PF	PA	BP	Pts
1	Munster	3	3	0	0	38	7	0	12
2	Leinster	3	2	0	1	42	21	1	9
3	Connacht	3	1	0	2	54	29	2	6
4	Ulster	3	0	0	3	11	88	3	3

6 September 2014	Ulster	0-22	Munster	Ravenhill Stadium, Belfast

13 September 2014	Connacht	39-5	Ulster	The Sportsground, Galway

20 September 2014	Leinster	27-6	Ulster	Milltown House, Ashbourne

== Ulster Rugby Awards ==
The Heineken Ulster Rugby Awards ceremony was held at the Culloden Estate and Spa, Holywood. Winners were:

- Bank of Ireland Ulster Player of the Year: Craig Gilroy
- Heineken Ulster Rugby Personality of the Year: Rory Best
- BT Young Player of the Year: Stuart McCloskey
- Rugby Writers Player of the Year: Craig Gilroy
- Ulster Rugby Supporters Club Player of the Year: Darren Cave
- Abbey Insurance Academy Player of the Year: Sammy Arnold
- Danske Bank Ulster Schools Player of the Year: Rob Lyttle
