= National Maritime College of Ireland =

Maritime college in Cork, Ireland

Coordinates: 51.8329°N 8.3051°W

- Irish: Coláiste Náisiúnta Mara na hÉireann
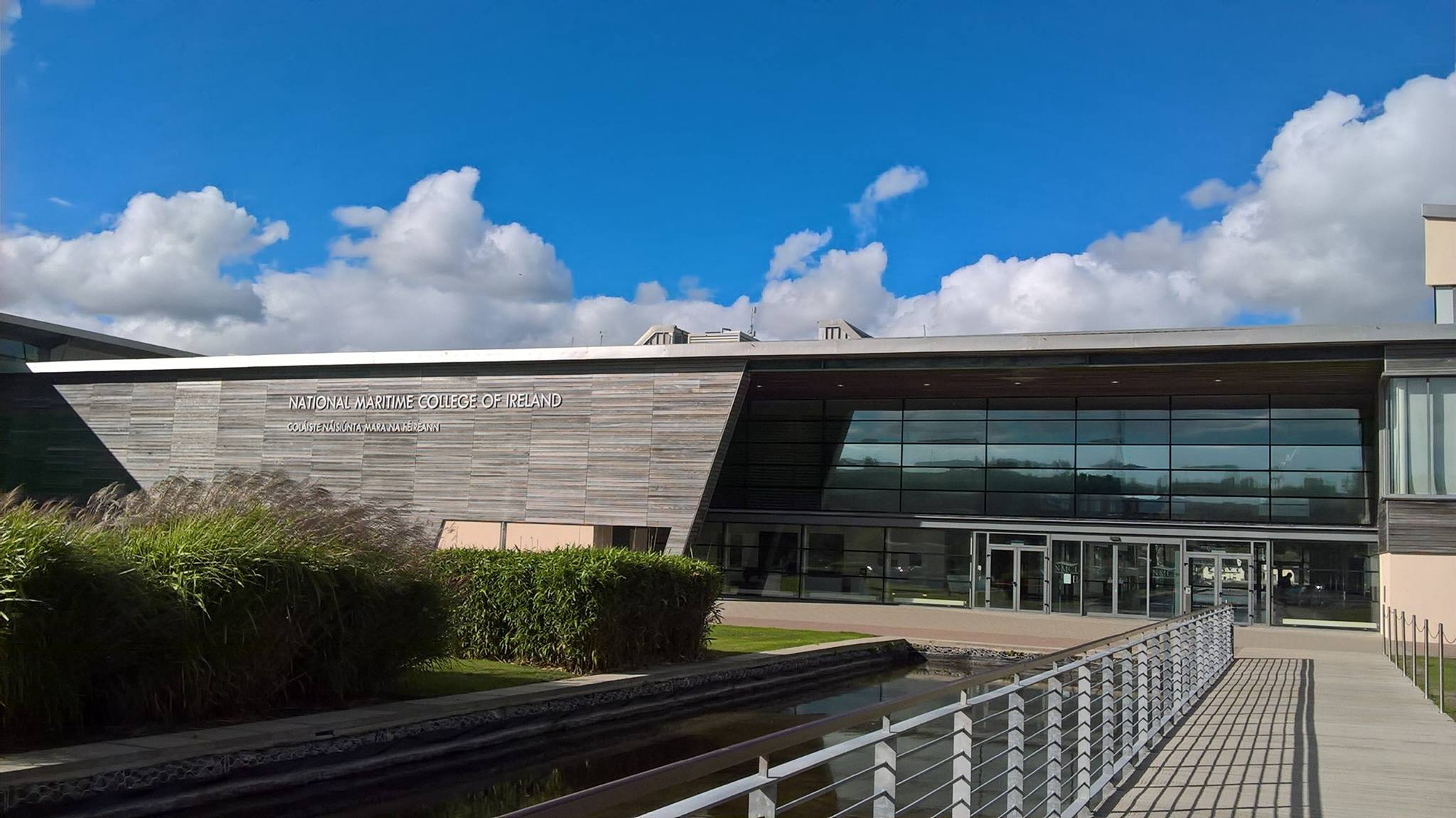
- Type: Public
- Established: 2004; 22 years ago
- Parent institution: Munster Technological University
- Director: Cormac Gebruers
- Head of Maritime Studies: Capt. Sinéad Reen
- Location: Ringaskiddy, County Cork, Ireland
- Website: www.nmci.ie

The National Maritime College of Ireland (Irish: Coláiste Náisiúnta Mara na hÉireann, NMCI) is a public maritime college located in Ringaskiddy, County Cork, Ireland. It is a constituent college of the Munster Technological University. Founded in 2004, it is situated on former Department of Defence land aside the Haulbowline naval base, the headquarters of the Irish Naval Service. It is the first dedicated maritime college of its kind in the State, and was built under the Irish Government's Public-Private Partnership scheme, involving the Munster Technological University (formerly, Cork Institute of Technology), the Naval Service and a number of other partners.

The Irish Naval Service and other Defence Forces personnel carry out non-combat training at the National Maritime College of Ireland, with a permanent Naval Service cadre present on site to assist in the carrying out of this training.

== History and operations ==
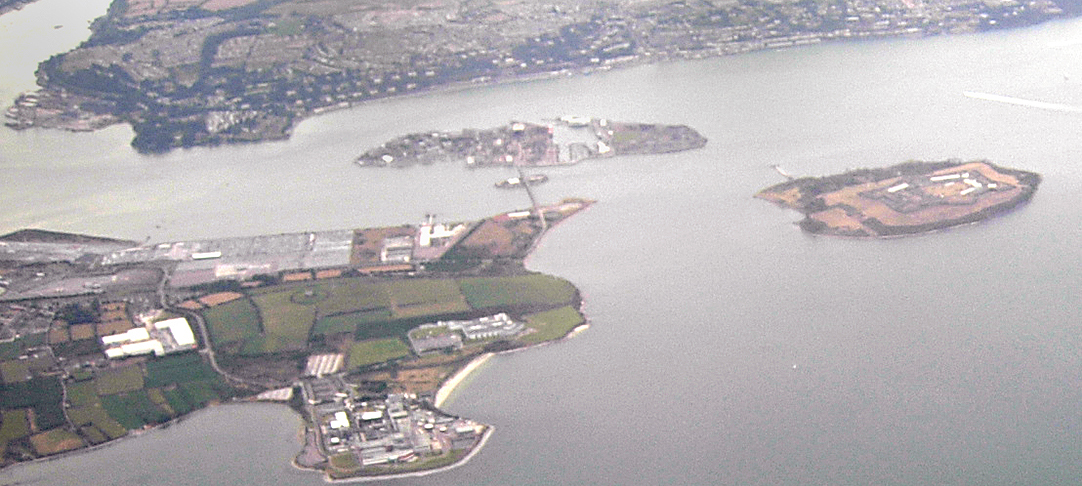
An aerial photograph of Cork Harbour. The National Maritime College of Ireland campus can be seen below Haulbowline Island.

Whilst formal navigational training of Irish seafarers first began in Dublin in the late 18th century with the creation of the Irish Nautical College (first located in Dublin, later it moved to Dún Laoghaire), informal training in seamanship and navigation has been carried out in Ireland, typically through an apprenticeship, for a number of centuries.

This situation continued until 1975 when it was agreed by the Department of Education that all maritime training and education would be carried out at the newly established Cork Regional Technical College campus in Bishopstown, with all staff and equipment of the former Irish Nautical College folded into Cork RTC as the Department of Nautical Studies. However, by the late 1990s, the expansion of (and resulting competition for space in) the Bishopstown campus and new practical training requirements of the 1995 STCW Code, had made the Bishopstown campus unsuitable, requiring significant expenditure to remain in compliance.

Seeking to maintain a training facility in Ireland capable of providing maritime training, proposals were made by the newly renamed Cork Institute of Technology to the Irish Naval Service, itself looking to improve its training and accommodation facilities. Informal discussions between college staff and naval officers led to a tentative proposal that unused Department of Defence land in Ringaskiddy be developed as a joint college, sharing costly facilities and avoiding duplication of academic, commercial and Naval Service training.

Opened in 2004, the National Maritime College of Ireland provides education, training and research to the international shipping industry, through a network of partnerships with companies like Chevron Shipping, Teekay, and a number of shipping companies. Its research centre, the HALPIN Centre, carries out maritime research and development projects in various aspects of maritime operations, such as the development of a towed radar kite for the Naval Service, and is based within the college.

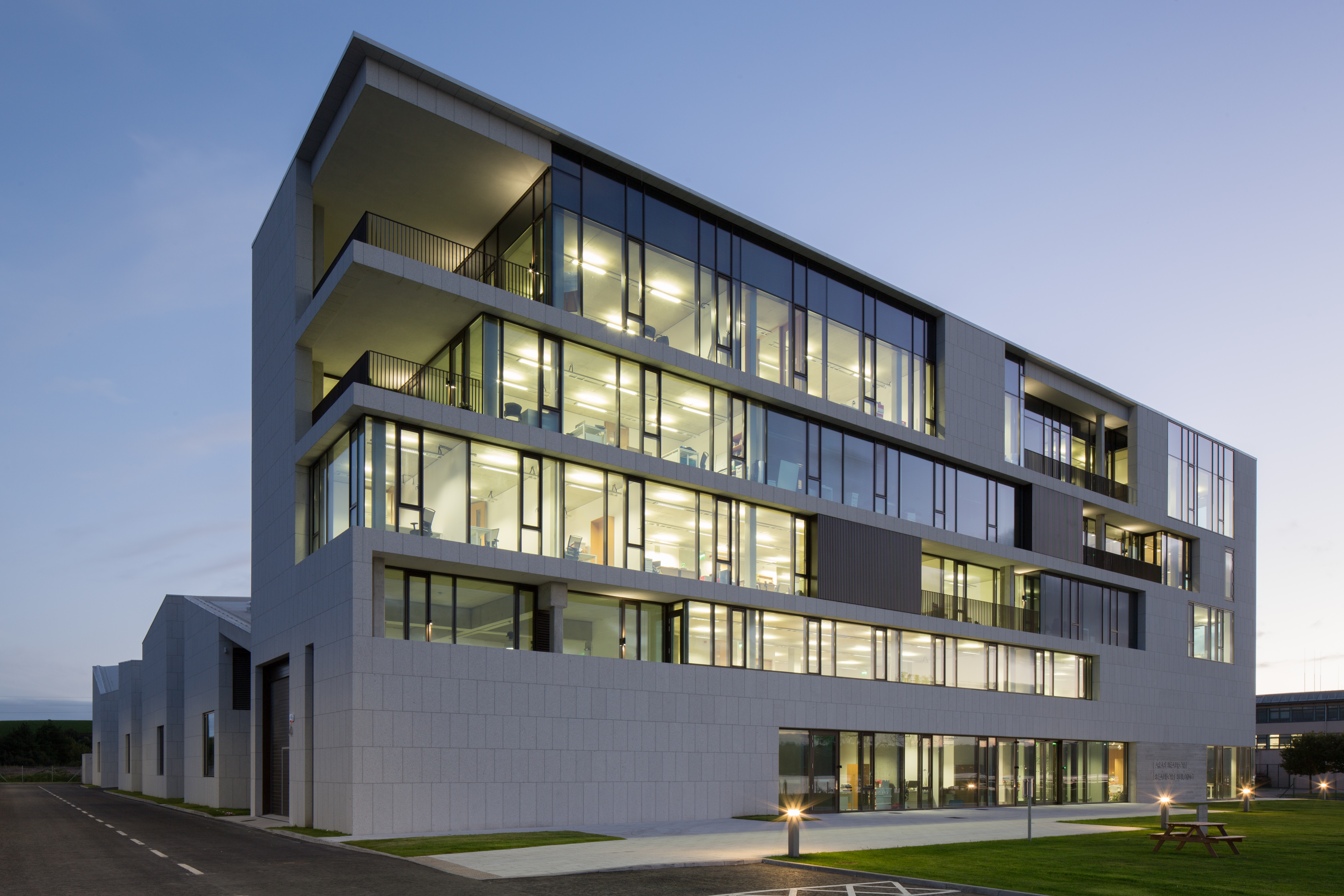
Beaufort Maritime and Energy Research Laboratory on the National Maritime College of Ireland campus.

In addition to the HALPIN Centre, the National Maritime College of Ireland campus is home to the University College Cork Beaufort Maritime and Energy Research Laboratory, the largest maritime and energy research centre in the world, which hosts the MaREI (Centre for Marine and Renewable Energy), a research and development centre for marine research and renewable energy sectors. The laboratory is home to Lir - the National Ocean Test Facility, which consists of a number of artificial wave basins for scaled testing of ship, offshore wind energy and tidal energy designs. MaREI is also home to a European Space Agency business incubator.

In January 2021, Cork Institute of Technology (of which the National Maritime College of Ireland is a constituent college) merged with IT Tralee to form Munster Technological University. Thus the NMCI became a constituent college of the new Technological University.

== Training facilities ==
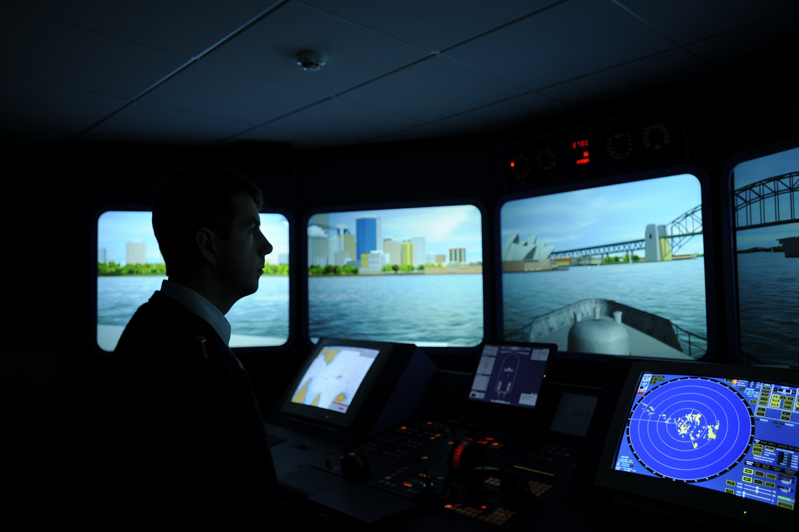
A bridge simulator at the National Maritime College.

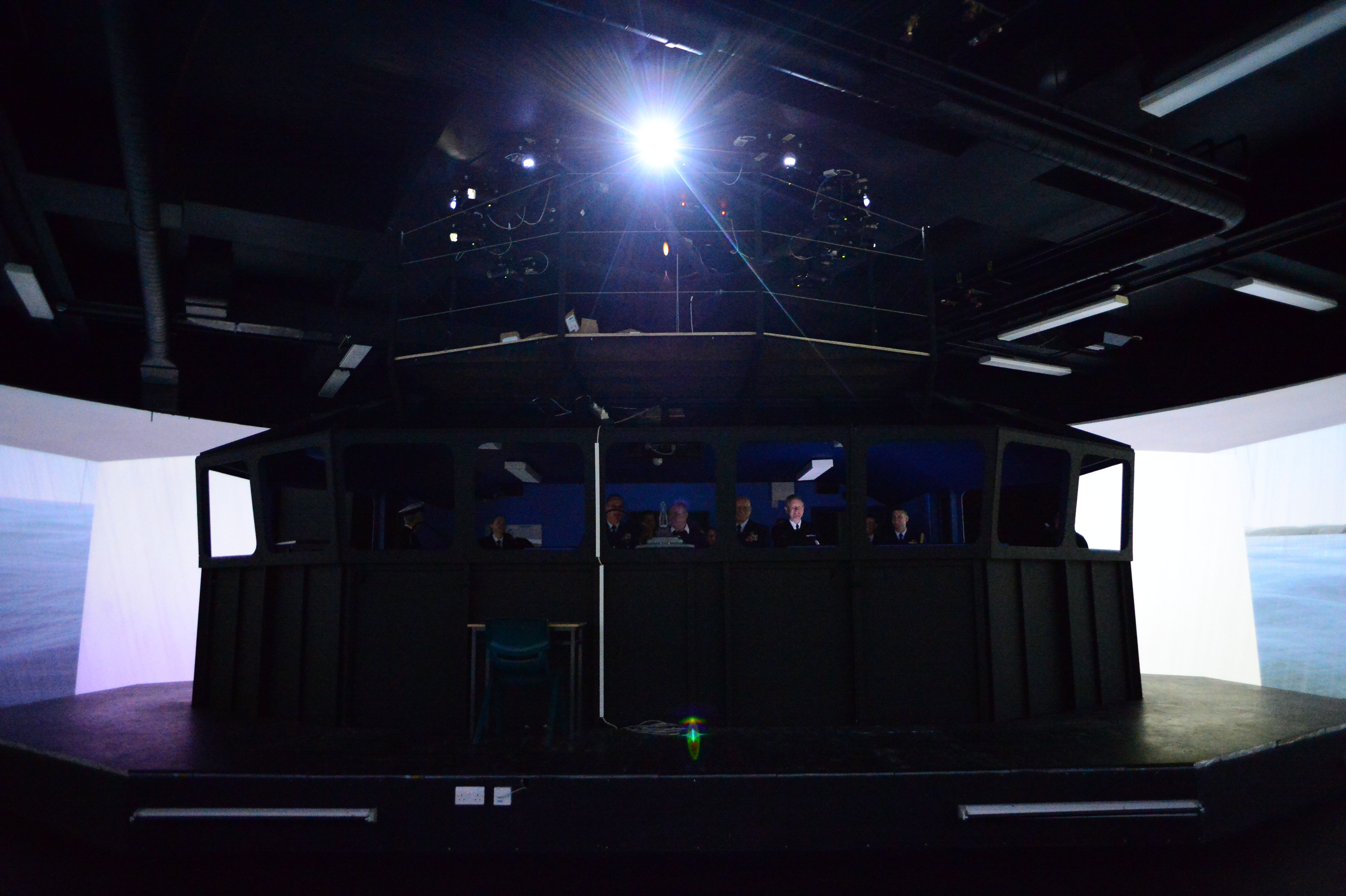
The 360° bridge watchkeeping simulator.

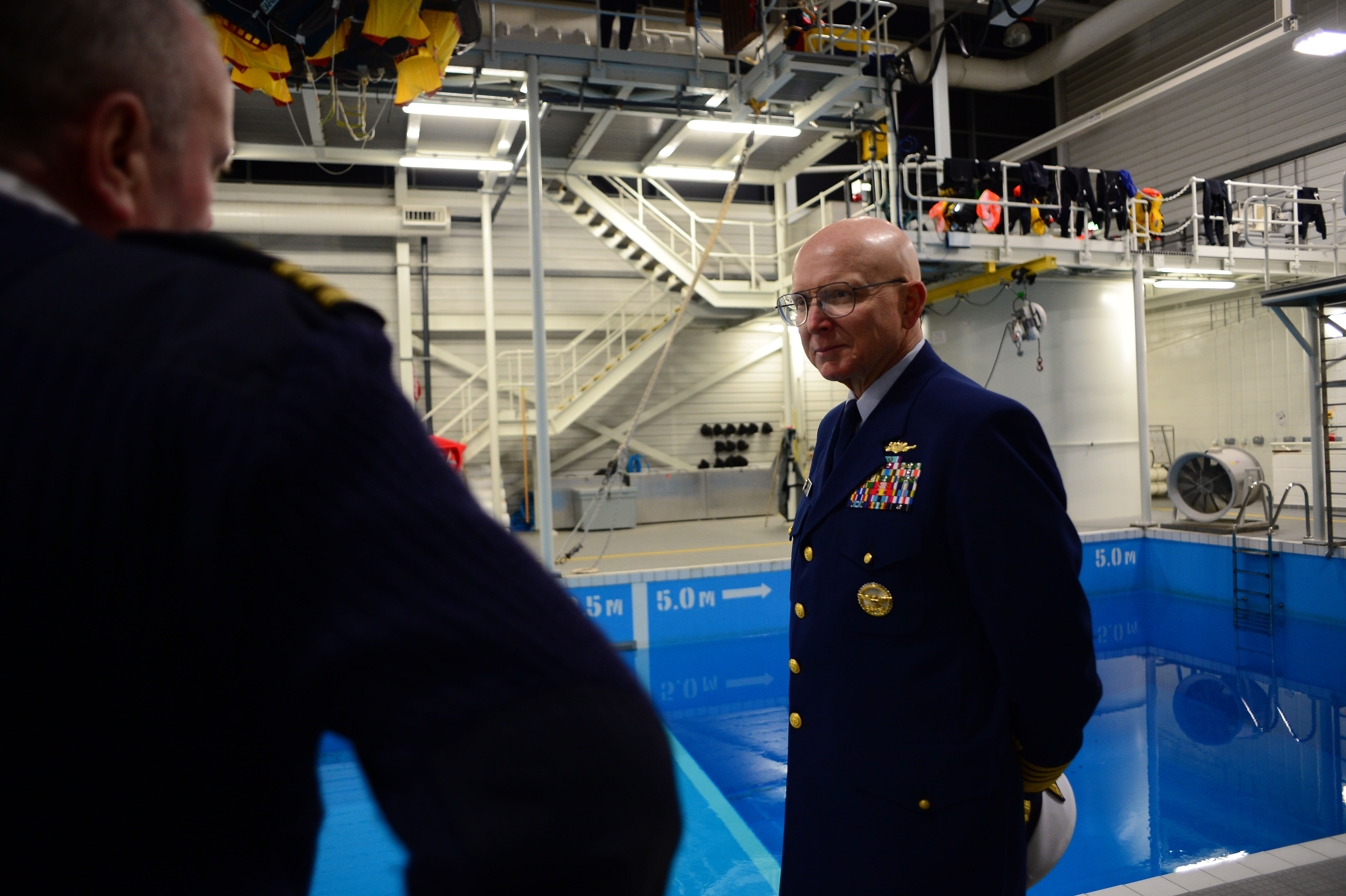
The sea-survival pool.

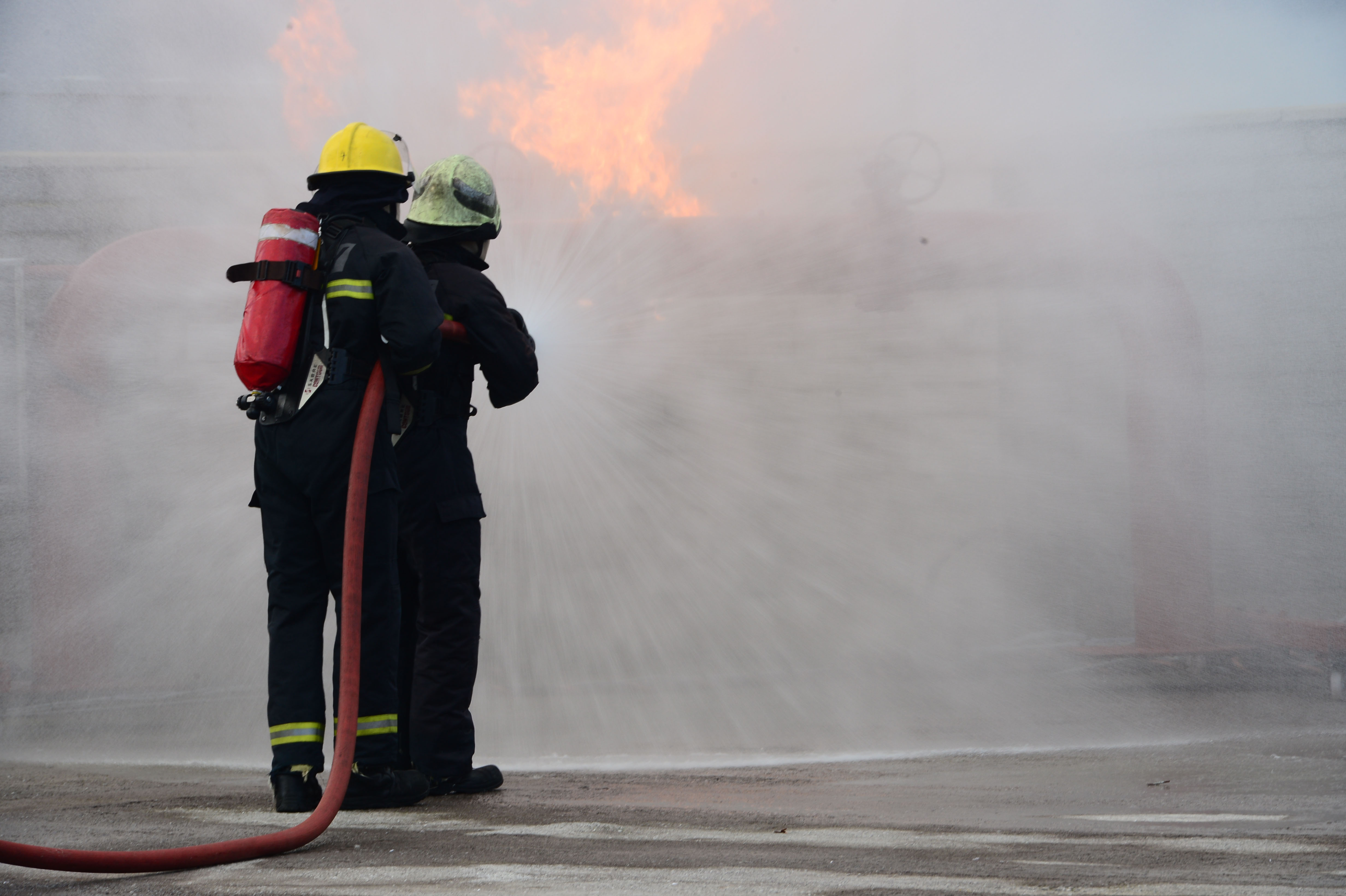
Students carrying out fire-fighting exercise.

In additional to lecture halls and other student amenities, the college has a number of specialist maritime training facilities. These include, for example, a sea-survival training pool which includes a wave machine and wind generators. There is also a helicopter "dunking" trainer, used to train personnel to escape from helicopters which have ditched in open water. Also on site is a lifeboat jetty (and several types of lifeboat) used for training purposes.

There is also a fire-fighting training simulator (designed to reflect hazards found on ships), radio (GMDSS) training suites, bridge simulation equipment (including a 360° bridge watchkeeping simulator), and engine room simulation equipment. In additional to machinery room equipment (diesel engines and boilers) used for familiarisation and training, there are several workshops and laboratories.

== Training programmes ==
The National Maritime College of Ireland provides the following undergraduate education and training degree programmes:

- Nautical Science (BSc): This course is intended for those who desire to pursue a career as a Deck Officer on board a ship.
- Marine and Plant Engineering (BEng): This course provides training in marine plant, electrical, welding and mechanical workshops, in order to allow students to pursue a career as an engine officer, supplemented by means of practical experience in the college's engine room and machinery simulation rooms.
- Marine Electrotechnology (BEng): The course begins the same as the degree in Marine and Plant Engineering, following the same modules for the first year. Following the completion of their first year, in their second year, students start electrical and electronic training in a number of workshops and laboratories, in order to allow students to pursue a career as an Electro-technical officer.

The college also offers courses to licensed seafarers, for example, courses to qualify as a Chief Mate, Master or Chief Engineer can be undertaken at the National Maritime College of Ireland, in addition to safety courses required under the STCW Convention.

== Student life ==
As a constituent college of Munster Technological University (MTU), students at the National Maritime College of Ireland are full MTU students and have access to the same facilities (gym, college library and sports facilities) and benefits (student union, university societies and sports teams) as students in the rest of the Technological University. However, the NMCI campus in Ringaskiddy is 22 kilometres (14 mi) from the main campus in Bishopstown. The NMCI campus is served by a number of Bus Éireann routes, including route numbers 223 and 225.

In 2019, the National Maritime College of Ireland joined the International Seafarers' Welfare and Assistance Network, a charity which operates a 24-hour helpline for seafarers, at sea and ashore. This aims to promote the mental health and welfare of students, and the college also engages the services of a professional counsellor.

== Controversies ==
Between 2016 and 2017, the National Maritime College of Ireland was in dispute with the Marine Survey Office (the maritime regulator) over the approval of IMO STCW refresher courses carried out at the college. The dispute arose after the Marine Survey Office refused to accredit the courses, meaning maritime authorities were unable to recognise it as a qualification, leaving mariners affected in limbo. The dispute continued into 2017 with the Department of Transport issuing a Marine Notice reminding seafarers of its course certification requirements. The dispute eventually reached the High Court, however as the maritime college had received accreditation from the UK Maritime and Coastguard Agency for the courses in question, and the mutual recognition of qualifications is a requirement under European Union law, the European Commission ultimately ordered the Irish Government to recognise the qualifications, resolving the dispute in the National Maritime College of Ireland's favour.
