= Neal Horgan =

Irish footballer (born 1979)

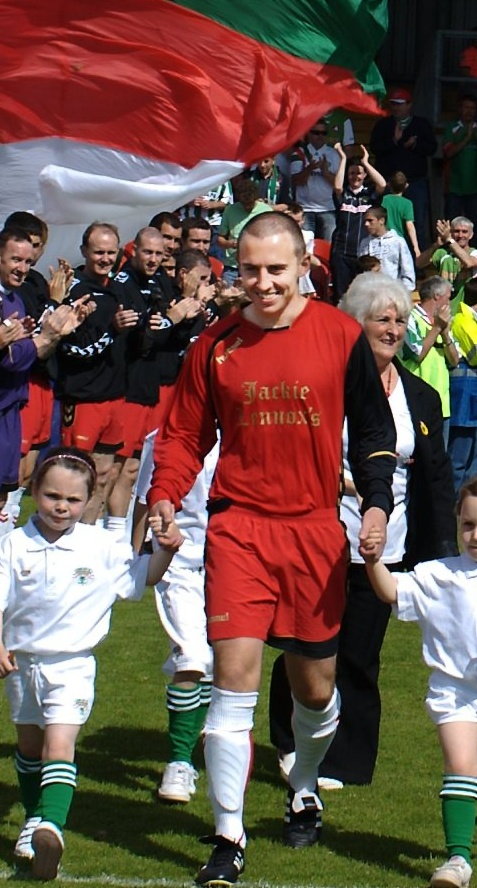
- Horgan receiving a guard of honour at his testimonial for Cork City

Personal information
- Date of birth: 29 November 1979 (age 46)
- Place of birth: San Francisco, United States
- Position: Right-back

Youth career
- Glasheen
- Wilton

Senior career*
Years	Team	Apps	(Gls)
1999–2009	Cork City	270	(6)
2009	Douglas Hall, Cork		
2010–2014	Cork City	55	(0)
- * Club domestic league appearances and goals

Neal Horgan (born 29 November 1979) is an Irish former professional footballer who played as a right-back for Cork City in the League of Ireland Premier Division.

== Youth and schoolboy success ==
Neal was born in San Francisco, United States. He attended primary school in Glasheen Boys' School. Later, he won three Munster Schools Senior soccer titles with his secondary school Coláiste an Spioraid Naoimh, in Bishopstown, County Cork. He also received two Munster Youth Cup winners medals with Wilton for his part in a very successful team. Following this success, Horgan represented his college and his country at the World University Games. He signed for Cork City and competed with Alan Carey for the right fullback position.

== Cork City ==
Under manager Pat Dolan, Horgan played at right fullback for Cork City before fracturing his leg in April 2004 during a Munster derby against Waterford United, ruling him out of the club's UEFA Inter-Toto Cup campaign. (The then under-21 level prospect, and future club captain, Cillian Lordan deputised for Horgan in his absence). Horgan recovered ahead of schedule to reclaim his place as the season came to a close.

Horgan played a role in Cork City's League of Ireland winning campaign in 2005, and completed a Law degree in 2006.

Because of his birth on American soil Neal is eligible to work without visa issues in the USA. During the following Winter off-season (January 2007) Neal investigated the possibility of combining his football and law experience in the US, participating in a pre-season camp in Mexico with Colorado Rapids before choosing instead to return to Cork City for the start of the 2007 campaign.

Neal announced his retirement from professional football after the 2009 season, to further his studies in Law, but then signed for non-professional side Douglas Hall and in June 2010 signed a new contract with Cork City.

He works for Healy O'Connor Solicitors.

== Publications ==
Horgan is a published author, having written a booked entitled 'Death of a Football Club?: The Story of Cork City FC: Season 2008' in 2014, where he recalls the liquidation battle facing his football club during the 2008 season. Subsequently, Horgan followed up this book with a second book entitled 'Second City: The Fall, Death and Rise of Cork City FC, Part Two, Season 2009', which was published in 2016 and continued from where his first book finished off.

== Honours ==
Cork City

- League of Ireland : 2005
- FAI Cup : 2007
- Setanta Sports Cup : 2008
- League of Ireland First Division : 2011
