= Anne O'Leary (technologist) =

Irish technologist

- Education: London Business School; Munster Technological University; Harvard University
- Employer(s): Meta Platforms; BT Group

Anne O'Leary is an Irish technologist who is the head of Meta, Ireland, having previously been chief executive officer of Vodafone and BT Group. In 2019 she was named the KPMG Business Person of the Year, and in 2024 she was awarded an honorary doctorate from University College Cork.

== Early life and education ==
O'Leary is from Cork. She studied marketing at Munster Technological University, and earned a postgraduate degree in strategy and leadership at the London Business School.

== Career ==
O'Leary started her career at Nixdorf Computer. She worked at BT Group and Esat Telecom.

O'Leary worked as chief executive officer of Vodafone from 2013 to 2022. Here she was responsible for the roll out of the 4G and 5G networks. She was only the second woman to hold such a position, and used it to advocate for the recruitment and retention of more women in technology. Under her leadership, more than half of the Vodafone leadership team were women. She introduced programmes to support employees undergoing fertility treatment, and for people who had experienced pregnancy loss or intimate partner violence. In 2019 she was named KPMG Business Person of the Year.

In 2023 O'Leary was appointed Head of Meta Ireland. She works with people across Europe, the Middle East and Africa, looking to expand the use of Meta's applications.

In 2024 she was elected President of Ibec. She was awarded an honorary doctorate from University College Cork in 2024, where she is a board member.
