= Simcox Cup =

- Irish: Corn Siomcóg
- Code: Gaelic football
- Founded: 1911
- Region: Cork (GAA)
- Trophy: Simcox Cup
- No. of teams: 11
- Title holders: Clonakilty Community College (1st title)
- Most titles: Coláiste Chríost Rí (23 titles)
- Official website: Official website

The Simcox Cup, officially known as the Cork Post-Primary Schools Senior A Football Championship, is an annual inter-schools Gaelic football competition organised by the Cork Post-Primary Schools division of the Cork County Board of the Gaelic Athletic Association (GAA). It was first played in 1911. It is the highest inter-schools Gaelic football competition in County Cork.

The final, typically held in March, serves as the culmination of a knockout series of games played between October and March. Eligible players must be under the age of 19. It is a stand-alone competition and runs concurrently with the Corn Uí Mhuirí.

As of 2024, 11 teams were participating in the Simcox Cup. Coláiste an Spioraid Naoimh are the title-holders after defeating Clonakilty Community College by 2–10 to 1–09 in the 2024 final.

== Participating teams ==
The following teams took part in the 2023–24 series of games.

Team	Location
Clonakilty Community College	Clonakilty
Coláiste an Spioraid Naoimh	Bishopstown
Coláiste Choilm	Ballincollig
Coláiste Chríost Rí	Turners Cross
Coachford College	Coachford
De La Salle College	Macroom
Hamilton High School	Bandon
Patrician Academy	Mallow
Skibbereen Community School	Skibbereen
St Colman's College	Fermoy
St Francis College	Rochestown

== List of finals ==
Year	Winners	Score	Runners-up	Score
1950-51				
1951-52				
1952-53	St. Theresa's College, Castlmartyr			
1953-54	St. Theresa's College, Castlmartyr	2-02	Colaiste Iosagain, Ballyvouney	1-03
1954-55				
1955-56				
1956-57				
1957-58				
1958-59	Coláiste Chríost Rí			
1959-60	Coláiste Chríost Rí			
1960-61	Coláiste Chríost Rí			
1961-62				
1962-63	Coláiste Chríost Rí			
1963-64				
1964-65	Coláiste Chríost Rí			
1955-66				
1966-67	Colasiste Iosagain, Ballyvourney			
1967-68	Coláiste Chríost Rí			
1968-69				
1969-70	Coláiste Chríost Rí			
1970-71				
1971-72				
1972-73				
1973-74				
1974-75				
1975-76				
1976-77				
1977-78	Coláiste Chríost Rí			
1978-79	Coláiste Chríost Rí			
1979-80	Coláiste Chríost Rí			
1980-81				
1981-82				
1982-83	Coláiste Chríost Rí			
1983-84	Coláiste Chríost Rí			
1984-85	Coláiste Chríost Rí			
1985-86				
1986-87				
1987-88				
1988-89				
1989-90				
1990-91				
1991-92				
1992-93				
1993-94				
1994-95				
1995-96				
1996-97				
1997-98				
1998-99				
1999-2000				
2000-01	Coláiste Chríost Rí			
2001-02	Coláiste Chríost Rí			
2002-03	Coláiste Chríost Rí			
2003-04	Coláiste Chríost Rí			
2004-05	Coláiste an Spioraid Naoimh			
2005-06				
2006-07				
2007-08	Coláiste Choilm, Ballincollig			
2008-09	Coláiste Chríost Rí			
2009-10				
2010-11	Coláiste Chríost Rí	1-15	St Francis College	2-08
2011-12	De La Salle, Macroom			
2012-13	De La Salle, Macroom	0-11	St Francis College	1-07
2013-14	Coláiste Choilm, Ballincollig			
2014-15	Coláiste Chríost Rí			
2015-16	Coláiste Chríost Rí			
2016–17	St Francis College	1–11	Coláiste Choilm	0–12
2017–18	Coláiste Chríost Rí			
2018–19	Patrician Academy Mallow	2–16	St Francis College	2–10
2019–20	Cancelled due to the COVID-19 pandemic			
2020–21	Cancelled due to the COVID-19 pandemic			
2021–22	Skibbereen Community School	1–14	Clonakilty Community College	2–10
2022–23	Coláiste an Spioraid Naoimh	1–05	Skibbereen Community School	1–04
2023–24	Coláiste an Spioraid Naoimh	2–10	Clonakilty Community College	1–09
2024–25	Hamilton High School	0–11	Skibbereen Community College	1–06
2025–26	Clonakilty Community College	0–17	Coláiste Choilm	0–11
