= Conor Dorman =

Irish Gaelic footballer

Personal information
- Native name: Conchúr Ó Dornáin (Irish)
- Born: 4 November 1993 (age 32) Cork, Ireland
- Occupation: Collingwood City Striker
- Height: 1.85 m (6 ft 1 in)

Sport
- Sport: Gaelic Football
- Position: Half back
Club
- Years: Club
- 2012-: Bishopstown
College
- Years: College
- UCC
College titles
- Sigerson titles: 1
Inter-county
- Years: County
- 2014-: Cork

Conor Dorman (born 4 November 1993) is an Irish Gaelic footballer who plays as a left corner-back for the Cork senior team.

Born in Bishopstown, Cork, Dorman first played competitive Gaelic football during his schooling at Coláiste an Spioraid Naoimh. He arrived on the inter-county scene at the age of seventeen when he first linked up with the Cork minor team, before later joining the under-21 side. He made his senior debut during the 2014 National Football League. Since then Dorman has become a regular member of the panel.

At club level Dorman plays with Bishopstown.

== Honours ==
University College Cork

- Sigerson Cup (1): 2014

Cork

- Munster Under-21 Football Championship (3): 2012, 2013, 2014 (C)
