= Ken O'Halloran =

Irish hurler and Gaelic footballer

Personal information
- Native name: Cionnaith ÓKenneth hAllúráin (Irish)
- Born: 7 August 1986 (age 40) Bishopstown, Cork
- Occupation: teacher
- Height: 6 ft 4 in (193 cm)

Sport
- Sport: Gaelic Football
- Position: Goalkeeper
Club
- Years: Club
- 2003–present: Bishopstown
College
- Years: College
- UCC
College titles
- Sigerson titles: 1
Inter-county
Years	County	Apps (scores)
2010-2017	Cork	17
Inter-county titles
- Munster titles: 1
- All-Irelands: 1
- NFL: 3
- All Stars: 2 Sigerson All Stars

Ken O'Halloran (born 7 August 1986 in Bishopstown, Cork, Ireland) is an Irish former sportsperson. He plays Gaelic football and hurling with his local club Bishopstown and was a member of the Cork senior inter-county football team from 2010 till his retirement in 2017.

== Career ==
=== Intercounty ===
He has played with Cork at all underage levels in both football and hurling. At minor level he won a Munster Hurling Championship in 2004 . At Under 21 football he won Munster Football Championships in 2005, 2006 & 2007, in 2007 he also won a Munster Hurling Championship as well as an All Ireland Football medal. He graduated to the Cork seniors where he won a Munster senior 2012, an All Ireland 2010 and three National Football Leagues (2010,11,12).

=== College ===
He started sigerson football from 2006 to 2011. He started for the UCC team in the Sigerson Cup, he played in the 2010 final but was on the losing side. He was on the winning ucc side of 2011. he also received two sigerson all stars 1010/2011.

=== Club ===
At club level he has enjoyed success with Bishopstown. He won back to back Minor hurling Championships with the club in 2003 & 2004. He then did the same at Under 21 level in 2006 & 2007. He also won an Intermediate Hurling Championship with the club. He was on the losing side in 2012 county hurling final to Sarsfields.

=== School ===
He helped his school, Coláiste an Spioraid Naoimh from Bishopstown, to win the Corn Uí Mhuirí title in 2005, the first in the school's history. He scored the winning goal in the semi-final and was man of the match in the final.

== Honours ==
=== Bishopstown ===
- Cork Intermediate Hurling Championship:
  - Winner (1): 2006
- Cork Minor Hurling Championship:
  - Winner (2):2003, 2004
- Cork Under-21 Hurling Championship:
  - Winner (2):2006, 2007

=== Cork ===
Football

- All-Ireland Senior Football Championship:
  - Winner (1):
- Munster Senior Football Championship:
  - Winner (1): 2012
  - Runner-up (1): 2011
- National Football League (Div 1):
  - Winner (2): 2010 (sub), 2011, 2012 (sub)
- All-Ireland Under-21 Football Championship:
  - Winner (1): 2007
  - Runner-up (1): 2006
- Munster Under-21 Football Championship:
  - Winner (3): 2005, 2006, 2007
- Munster Minor Football Championship:
  - Runner-up (1): 2004

Hurling

- Munster Minor Hurling Championship:
  - Winner (1): 2004
- Munster Under-21 Hurling Championship:
  - Winner (2): 2005, 2007
  - Runner-up (1): 2006

=== Coláiste an Spioraid Naoimh ===
- Corn Uí Mhuirí:
  - Winner (1): 2005

=== UCC ===
- Sigerson Cup:
  - Winner (1): 2011
  - Runner up (1): 2010
