= Paddy Ryan (rugby union, born 1990) =

US international rugby union player (b. 1990)

- Full name: Patrick Joseph Ryan
- Born: December 11, 1990 (age 35) Chicago, Illinois
- Height: 6 ft 1 in (1.85 m)
- Weight: 125 kg (276 lb)
- Notable relative(s): Tim Ryan (brother); Dave Ryan (brother)

Rugby union career
- Position: Prop
- Current team: Chicago Hounds
Amateur team(s)
Years	Team	Apps	(Points)
- Dolphin RFC
2017	Highfield RFC		
- Correct as of April 30, 2018
Senior career
Years	Team	Apps	(Points)
2014	Rugby Viadana	5	(10)
2014	London Welsh	3	(0)
2014–2015	UA Libourne	15	(5)
2015–2017	Newcastle Falcons	12	(0)
2017	Bath	0	(0)
2018	Austin Elite	3	(0)
2018–2020	Rugby United New York	18	(20)
2021–2022	Austin Gilgronis	12	(10)
2023–	Chicago Hounds		
- Correct as of 18 June 2022
International career
Years	Team	Apps	(Points)
2017–2019	United States	7	(0)
- Correct as of 18 June 2022

Patrick Joseph Ryan (born December 11, 1990) is an Irish-American rugby union player who plays as a prop for the Chicago Hounds in Major League Rugby (MLR) and the United States men's national team.

He previously played for the Newcastle Falcons in the English premiership before joining Austin Elite for the inaugural season of Major League Rugby in 2018. Ryan also played for Rugby United New York (RUNY) in Major League Rugby (MLR) in 2019 and 2020 and then for the Austin Gilgronis in 2021 and 2022.

== Family and early life ==
The son of an American mother, Paddy Ryan was born in Chicago, Illinois, but was raised in Ireland.

He played club rugby for Highfield RFC and Dolphin RFC in Cork, along with his older brothers Tim Ryan and Dave Ryan, who also later became professional rugby players.

Paddy Ryan joined the Munster Rugby academy, ultimately playing for the Munster Under-20 and Munster A sides.

== Club career ==
=== Early club career ===
Ryan began his professional career with Viadana in the Italian Eccellenza then played with London Welsh in the English RFU Championship, and UA Libourne in the French Fédérale 1.

=== In England: Newcastle and Bath ===
In July 2015, Ryan signed a two-year contract to play for the Newcastle Falcons. He made seven total appearances for the club in English Premiership games across the 2015–16 and 2016–17 seasons, making one start during the 2015–16 season.

Following the end of his tenure with Newcastle, Ryan joined Bath on a trial.

=== MLR: Austin and New York ===
Ryan joined Austin Elite for their inaugural Major League Rugby season in 2018. He suffered an injury early in the season, and only made three total appearances for the club.

In late 2018, Ryan signed with Rugby United New York (RUNY) for the 2019 season, making a preseason debut with the club in December 2018.

== International career ==
Ryan made his debut with the USA Eagles on June 10, 2017, appearing as a substitute in a mid-year test against Ireland. The Eagles lost the match by a score of 55–19.
