= Bishopstown Community School =

Coordinates: 51.8842°N 8.526°W

- Pobalscoil Bhaile an Easpaig
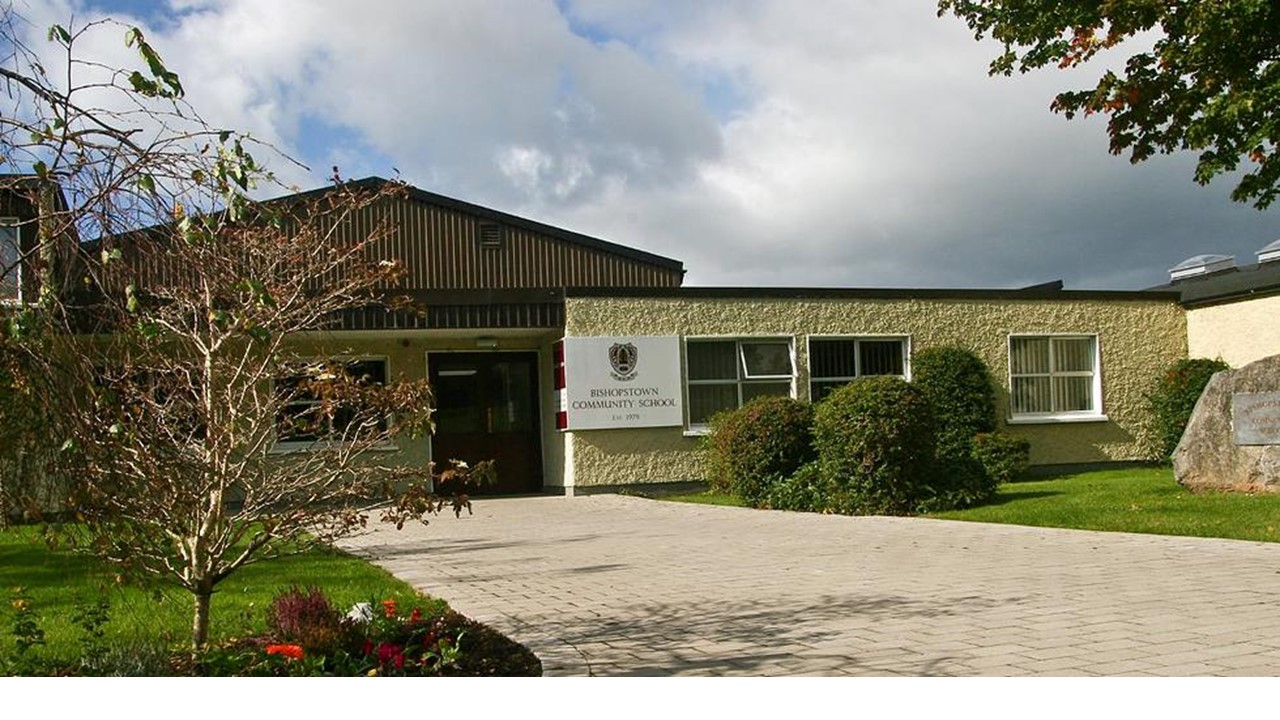
- Front entrance of BCS on Westgate Road
- Bishopstown, Cork; Ireland

Information
- Established: 1979
- Enrollment: c. 300 (2018)
- Website: http://bishopstowncs.ie

Bishopstown Community School is a secondary school in the Bishopstown area of Cork city in Ireland. Established in 1979, it is the only co-educational secondary school in the area.

In 2015 Bishopstown Community School was awarded the amber flag for the work of its students and staff in promoting positive mental health. In addition to this the school has produced a number of publications in this area.

Past pupils of the school include members of the band The Frank and Walters and rugby union player Ronan O'Gara.

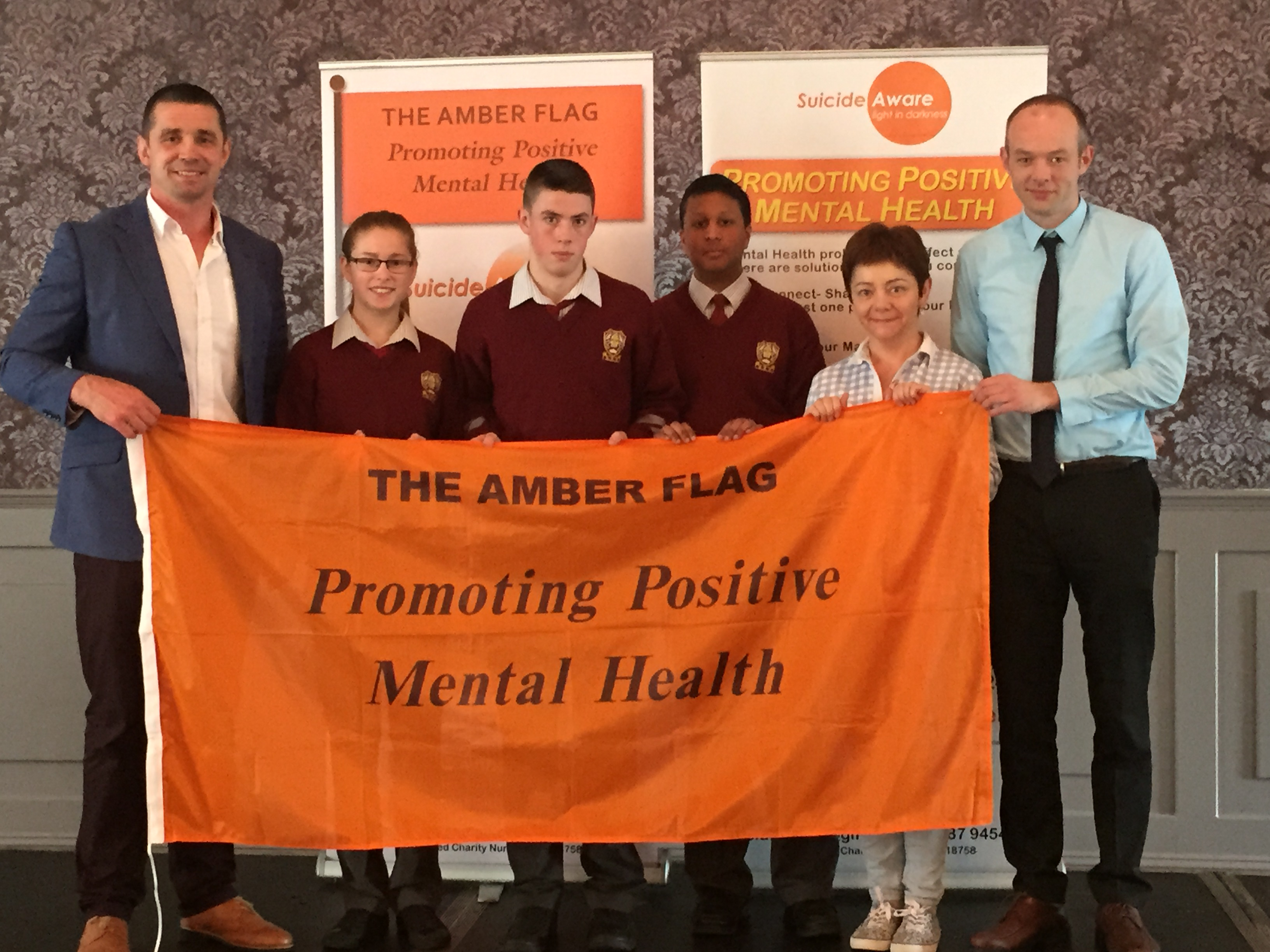
BCS Receiving the amber flag for its promotion of positive mental health
