= Maggie Cusack =

Academic and university president

Maggie Cusack is a Scottish academic and administrator who has been the inaugural president of Munster Technological University since 1 January 2021. She was previously Professor of Biomineralisation at the School of Geographical and Earth Sciences at the University of Glasgow. Her central research focuses on biominerals (shells, corals and bones.) On Thursday 10 December 2020, it was announced by Ireland's Minister for Further and Higher Education, Research, Innovation and Science Simon Harris that Maggie was to become the inaugural president of Munster Technological University once it is founded on 1 January 2021.

== Career ==
Cusack initially studied cell biology and did her doctoral thesis on protein biochemistry, however she is better known as a pioneer of geoscience in applying her discoveries about living organisms to advance understanding of fossils which allows a more accurate and reliable record of climate change.

Specifically, her research interests include determining the influence of ocean acidification on marine microbial photosynthesises, biometrics and biominerals in the realm of materials, bone therapies and stem cells. Some of the analytical approaches she employs include scanning electron microscopy; electron backscatter diffraction, synchrotron analyses and stable isotope measurements. Cusack's work has implications not only in that field but in the modern era too, in developing new synthetic materials for use in medicine, engineering and construction.

She is a Fellow of the Royal Society of Edinburgh.

== Select publications ==
- Fitzer, S.; Chung, P.; Maccherozzi, F.; Dhesi, S. S.; Kamenos, N. A.; Phoenix, V. R.; Cusack, M. (2016). "Biomineral shell formation under ocean acidification: a shift from order to chaos". Scientific Reports. 6 (1) 21076. Bibcode:2016NatSR...621076F. doi:10.1038/srep21076. PMC 4753494. PMID 26876022.
- Fitzer, S. C.; Vittert, L.; Bowman, A.; Kamenos, N. A.; Phoenix, V. R.; Cusack, M. (2015). "Ocean acidification and temperature increase impacts mussel shell shape and thickness: problematic for protection?". Ecology and Evolution. 5 (21): 4875–4884. Bibcode:2015EcoEv...5.4875F. doi:10.1002/ece3.1756. PMC 4662322. PMID 26640667.
- Freer, A.; Bridgett, S.; Jiang, J.; Cusack, M. (2014). "Biomineral proteins from Mytilus edulis mantle tissue transcriptome". Marine Biotechnology. 16 (1): 34–45. Bibcode:2014MarBt..16...34F. doi:10.1007/s10126-013-9516-1. PMC 3896809. PMID 23828607.
- Sommerdijk, N. A. J. M.; Cusack, M. (2014). "Biomineralization: crystals competing for space". Nature Materials. 13 (12): 1078–1079. doi:10.1038/nmat4147. PMID 25410977.
