= Cork Science Park =

Proposed science park in Cork, Ireland

Coordinates: 51.883°N 8.549°W

Cork Science and Innovation Park (CSAIP), or Cork Science Park, is a proposed science park in Bishopstown, a suburb of Cork city, Ireland. The park is close to Curraheen Park and Munster Technological University's Cork IT campus, near junction 2 of the N40. The site has been included as a possible stop in Transport Infrastructure Ireland's plans for the proposed Luas Cork light-rail route.

== Proposed development ==
The idea of a 150 acres (61 ha) science and innovation park has been considered by Cork County Council since 2009. If built as proposed, the park would link the city's two main third-level institutions (UCC and MTU) to private-sector research and development entities.

The city's administrative boundary was expanded in 2019, including the proposed science park campus.

In 2020, the National Transport Authority included the site as a potential stop for a future light rail route in the city. The site was again included in 2025 and 2026 updates to the route proposals, with the station possibly coming later once the site has been developed. The park was also included in the council's 5-year strategy in 2025.
