= Craig Gilroy =

Ireland international rugby union player

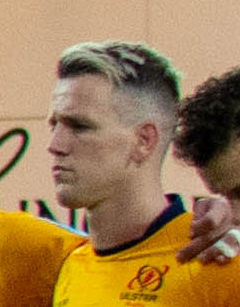
- Born: 11 March 1991 (age 35) Belfast, County Antrim, Northern Ireland
- Height: 6 ft 0 in (1.83 m)
- Weight: 93 kg (14 st 9 lb; 205 lb)
- School: Methodist College Belfast

Rugby union career
- Position: Wing / Fullback
- Current team: Ulster
Amateur team(s)
Years	Team	Apps	(Points)
- Dungannon
Senior career
Years	Team	Apps	(Points)
2010–2023	Ulster	213	(345)
- Correct as of 5 May 2022
International career
Years	Team	Apps	(Points)
2011	Ireland U20	6	(10)
2014	Emerging Ireland	3	(20)
2014–2015	Ireland Wolfhounds	2	(10)
2012–2017	Ireland	10	(25)
- Correct as of 11 February 2017

Craig Gilroy (born 11 March 1991) is an Irish rugby union player who played wing for Ulster, and a former Ireland international. He was Ulster's player of the year in 2014–15, and was named in the Pro12 Dream Team twice.

Born in the seaside town of Bangor, County Down, Craig was the middle of five children. Encouraged by his parents from a young age to play various sports, he took up both Gaelic football and soccer in his childhood. He then attended Methodist College Belfast, where he began to play rugby, and soon became a starting player in a team that won the Ulster Schools' Cup twice. After he left school, Justin Fitzpatrick signed him for Dungannon, and his form in the All-Ireland League led to him joining the Ulster academy in 2010. He scored the first try at the Aviva Stadium, in an exhibition match between an Ulster-Leinster team against a Munster-Connacht team in August 2010.

He made his first start for Ulster, scoring two tries, against Cardiff in the Magners League in November 2010. He made 14 appearances, scoring 8 tries, in the 2010–11 season, and was named Academy Player of the Year in the 2011 Ulster Rugby Awards. The following season he made 29 appearances, scoring six tries, as Ulster made the 2012 Heineken Cup Final. He was invited to train with the Ireland team for the 2012 Six Nations Championship, and made his debut for Ireland in May 2012 in a friendly against the Barbarians, scoring two tries. He was awarded Ulster's Young Player of the Year for the 2011–12 season, and was nominated for Irish Young Player of the Year, losing out to Munster's Peter O'Mahony.

In November 2012 he scored a hat-trick of tries for Ireland in a non-test match against Fiji at Thomond Park, He made his international test debut, scoring one try, against Argentina soon after. Early in the 2012–13 season, Gilroy signed a three-year contract extension to remain with Ulster until summer 2016. In February 2015 he earned his 100th cap for Ulster in a 43–3 win over Benetton Treviso, scoring two tries in a Man of the Match performance. He was named in the Pro12 Dream Team two years running, in 2014–15 and 2015–16. He was Ulster's Player of the Year in 2014–15. He scored a hat trick of tries for Ireland against Italy in the Stadio Olimpico in a 63–10 win in the 2017 Six Nations. He made his 200th appearance for Ulster against Ospreys in December 2021. In April 2023 Gilroy announced his departure from Ulster at the end of the season.
