= Bryan Murphy (Gaelic footballer) =

Irish Gaelic footballer and coach (born 1967)

Personal information
- Native name: Brian Ó Murchú (Irish)
- Born: September 1967 (age 59) Bishopstown, Cork, Ireland
- Occupation: General manager

Sport
- Sport: Gaelic football
- Position: Right corner-forward
Clubs
- Years: Club
- Bishopstown; Clane
Club titles
- Kildare titles: 1
College
- Years: College
- 1986-1991: University College Cork
College titles
- Fitzgibbon titles: 2
Inter-county
- Years: County
- 1996–2002: Kildare
Inter-county titles
- Leinster titles: 2
- All-Irelands: 0
- NFL: 0
- All Stars: 0

Bryan Murphy (born September 1967) is an Irish Gaelic football manager and former dual player of hurling and Gaelic football who played for club sides Bishopstown and Clane. He was a member of the Kildare senior football team for six years, while he also lined out with the Cork senior hurling team and the Cork senior football team.

== Honours ==
University College Cork

- Fitzgibbon Cup (2): 1990, 1991

Clane

- Kildare Senior Football Championship (1): 1997

Cork

- Munster Senior Hurling Championship (1): 1992
- All-Ireland Junior Football Championship (1): 1993
- Munster Junior Football Championship (1): 1993
- All-Ireland Minor Hurling Championship (1): 1985
- Munster Minor Hurling Championship (1): 1985
- Munster Minor Football Championship (1): 1985

Kildare

- Leinster Senior Football Championship (2): 1998, 2000
