= Ruaidhrí Murphy =

- Born: Ruaidhrí Murphy; 5 July 1987 (age 39) Dublin, Ireland
- Height: 1.87 m (6 ft 1 1/2 in)
- Weight: 119 kg (18 st 10 lb)
- School: Castleknock College
- University: Dublin City University
- Occupation(s): Business Owner & Scrum Coach for the ACT Brumbies

Rugby union career
- Position: Prop
Provincial / State sides
Years	Team	Apps	(Points)
2007–2008	Leinster	0	(0)
2009–2011	Exeter Chiefs	5	(0)
2014–2016	Ulster	3	(0)
Super Rugby
Years	Team	Apps	(Points)
2012–2014	Brumbies	29	(5)
- Correct as of 27 July 2014
International career
Years	Team	Apps	(Points)
2007	Ireland u20	5	(0)
- Correct as of 2 February 2015

Ruaidhrí Murphy is a former professional rugby union player who last played for Ulster Rugby in the 2015–16 season. Ruaidhrí's position of choice is prop. Ruaidhri is a former pupil of Castleknock College in Dublin and represented Leinster Schools and Ireland Schools during his school days at Castleknock. He was a member of the Ireland team at the Under 19 World Cup in Dubai before moving to Leinster Rugby and was part of the Under 20 Six Nations and Grand Slam winning side of 2007.

Murphy joined Exeter Chiefs in 2009 but was unable to break into the Chiefs first team, he remained with the squad and was part of the Chiefs 2009/10 RFU Championship winning side. With Exeter in the Aviva Premiership he featured only once in Premiership competition.

At the conclusion of the 2011 season Murphy left Exeter for Australia and joined Easts Tigers Rugby Union in Brisbane. He then joined Gungahlin Eagles, before earning a spot with the Brumbies.

As a youngster Murphy spent a large part of his youth in Perth where his father owns a business, Murphy has a strong appreciation for Australia and his long-term goal is to represent the Wallabies.

In 2014, Ulster Rugby announced that Murphy would return to Ireland by joining them on a two-year deal after the 2014 Super Rugby season.
