= Munster Technological University =

Irish technological university

- Ollscoil Teicneolaíochta na Mumhan
- Logo of the university
- Other name: MTU
- Established: 1 January 2021; 5 years ago
- President: Maggie Cusack
- Students: 18,000+
- Location: Rossa Avenue, Cork, Munster, T12 P928, Ireland
- Campus: MTU Bishopstown Campus, Bishopstown, Cork MTU Kerry North Campus, Tralee, County Kerry MTU Kerry South Campus, Tralee National Maritime College of Ireland, Ringaskiddy, Cork MTU Cork School of Music, Cork City Centre MTU Crawford College of Art and Design, Cork City Centre
Colours
- Website: www.mtu.ie

Munster Technological University (MTU; Irish: Ollscoil Teicneolaíochta na Mumhan) is a public technological university consisting of six campuses located in Cork city and County Kerry. The university was established in January 2021, the result of a merger between two institutes of technology, Cork Institute of Technology and the Institute of Technology, Tralee. Its creation was announced in May 2020. It accommodates more than 18,000 students and over 2,000 members of staff.

It is Ireland's second technological university, after Technological University Dublin.

== History ==
Early plans for a technical university (T.U.) in the region included a three-way merger with Waterford IT which was examined in 2012. In building a proposal, the two institutions sought to offer a multi-campus institution encompassing Cork city and County Kerry, creating a second university in the region, and a third in the province of Munster. A formal application for T.U. status was lodged in February 2019.

In May 2019, academic staff of Cork Institute of Technology and IT Tralee rejected the merger, and an international advisory panel visited the campuses. In 2019, Cork Institute of Technology refused to take on IT Tralee's financial debts.

In May 2020, Taoiseach Leo Varadkar announced the formal approval of the technological university, to begin operations in January 2021.

In October 2021, MTU launched the Code Red Period Dignity campaign to provide free period products to staff and students. It was the first university in Ireland to provide such a service. The campaign also ran a series of events, talks and workshops to tackle taboos and misinformation around menstruation.

In February 2023, MTU was the target of a ransomware attack, which caused the cancellation of all classes in its Cork campuses for a period. The university attributed the attack to 'Blackcat', a Russian cybercrime group, having received a ransom note threatening to sell and or publish data if a "significant" sum was not paid. The closure, which MTU stated was intended to protect staff and student data and which did not affect the Kerry campuses, lasted for one week. MTU, which did not pay the ransom, later confirmed that some university data had been made available on the "dark web".

== Facilities ==
Munster Technological University consists of six campuses, the Kerry campuses in Dromtacker and Clash Road in Tralee, and the Cork campuses in Bishopstown, Cork School of Music (Cork City Centre), and Crawford College of Art and Design, as well as the National Maritime College of Ireland (NMCI) facility in Ringaskiddy. Research activity is undertaken in a number of centres across the university's facilities. As of 2025, a collaboration research park, Cork Science Park, was in development in collaboration with University College Cork and Cork City Council.

=== Cork city ===
==== MTU Bishopstown Campus ====
The main Cork campus, of approximately eighty acres, is situated in Bishopstown in the western suburbs of Cork city. It has theatres, lecture rooms, laboratories, drawing studios, a library, computer suites, open access computing centre and research units. Recreational facilities for the expected student population include a running track, tennis courts, all-weather pitch, a gymnasium and grass playing pitches, while an indoor swimming pool is located nearby. This campus has won awards for its architectural design and aesthetics. A new sports facility building was planned for the campus, with works reportedly commencing during 2020. The facility, known as the MTU Arena, was formally opened in 2023.

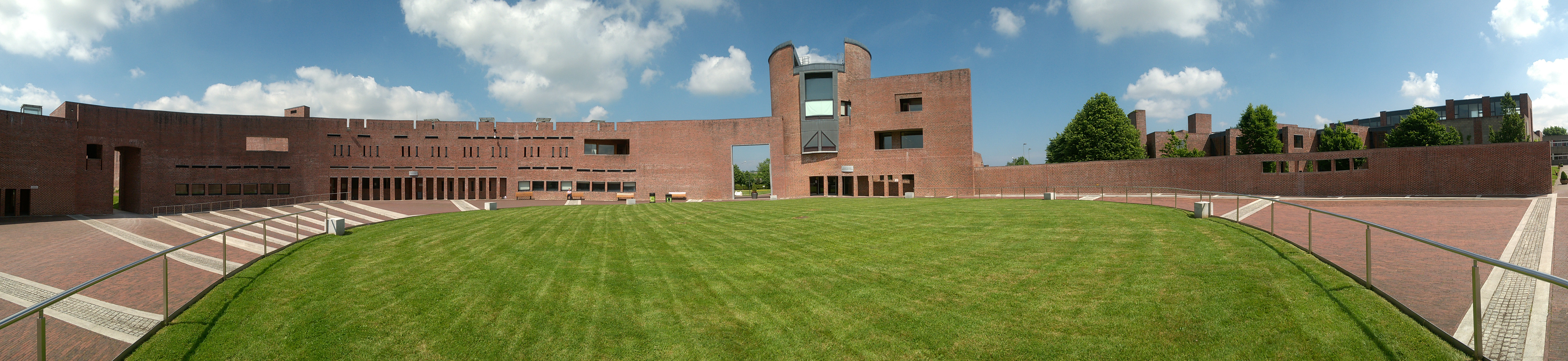
Panorama of the central circular courtyard at Bishopstown

==== MTU Crawford College of Art & Design ====
The Crawford College of Art and Design spans a number of buildings in the centre of Cork city. Visual communications and digital media courses are based between the Bishopstown Campus and Sober Lane building, adjacent to Sullivan's Quay. Several fine art and art programmes are based from the university's Sharman Crawford Street campus and its facility on Grand Parade. Art therapy and art and design education are also based from the Grand Parade building.

==== MTU Cork School of Music ====
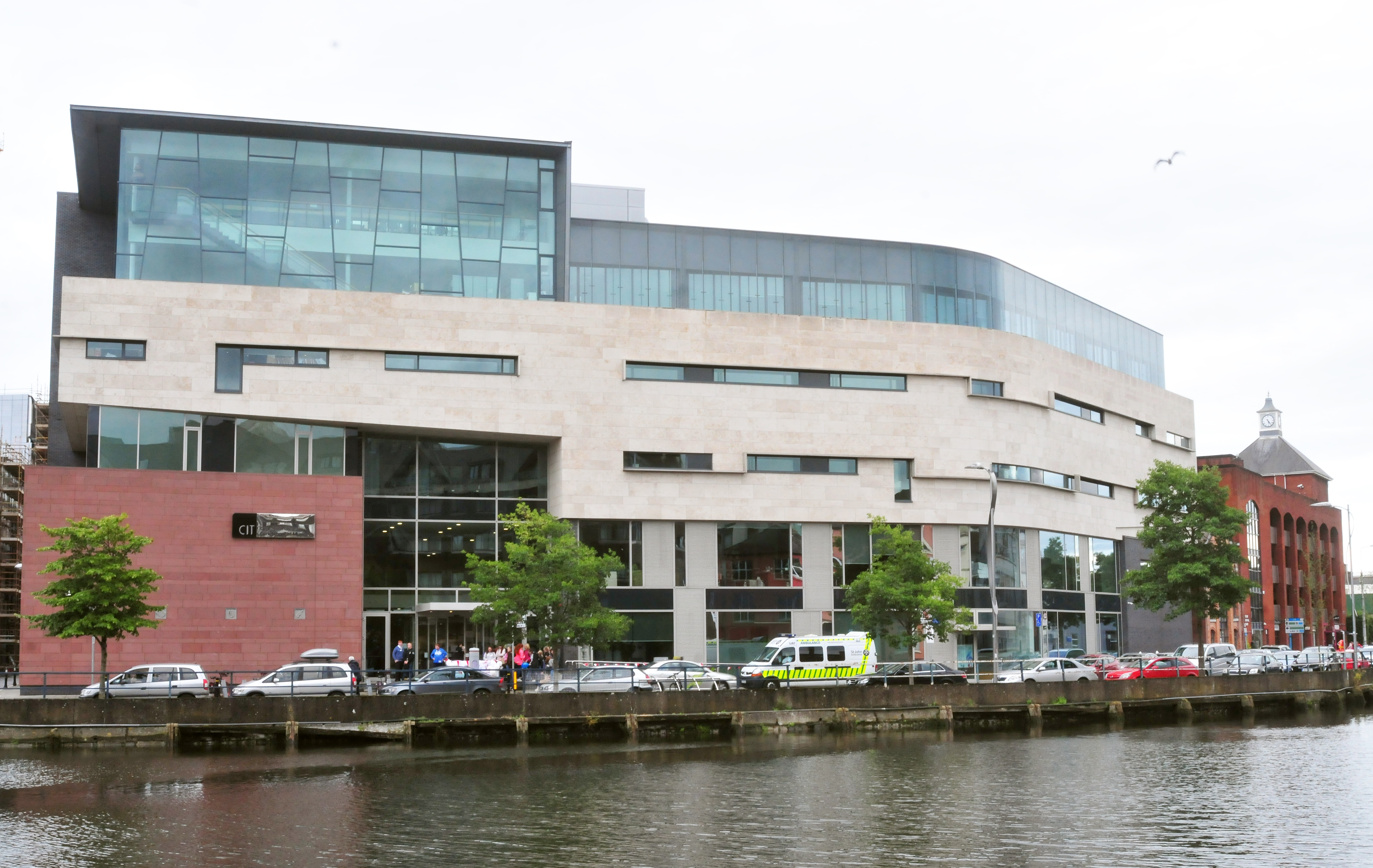
Cork School of Music building, Union Quay

This school of music is located on Union Quay in Cork city, operating from a purpose-built facility which opened in 2007.

==== National Maritime College of Ireland ====
The NMCI is a purpose-built college on a 10-acre campus and is located in Ringaskiddy, 18km from Cork city.

=== Kerry ===
==== MTU Kerry North Campus, Dromtacker, Tralee ====
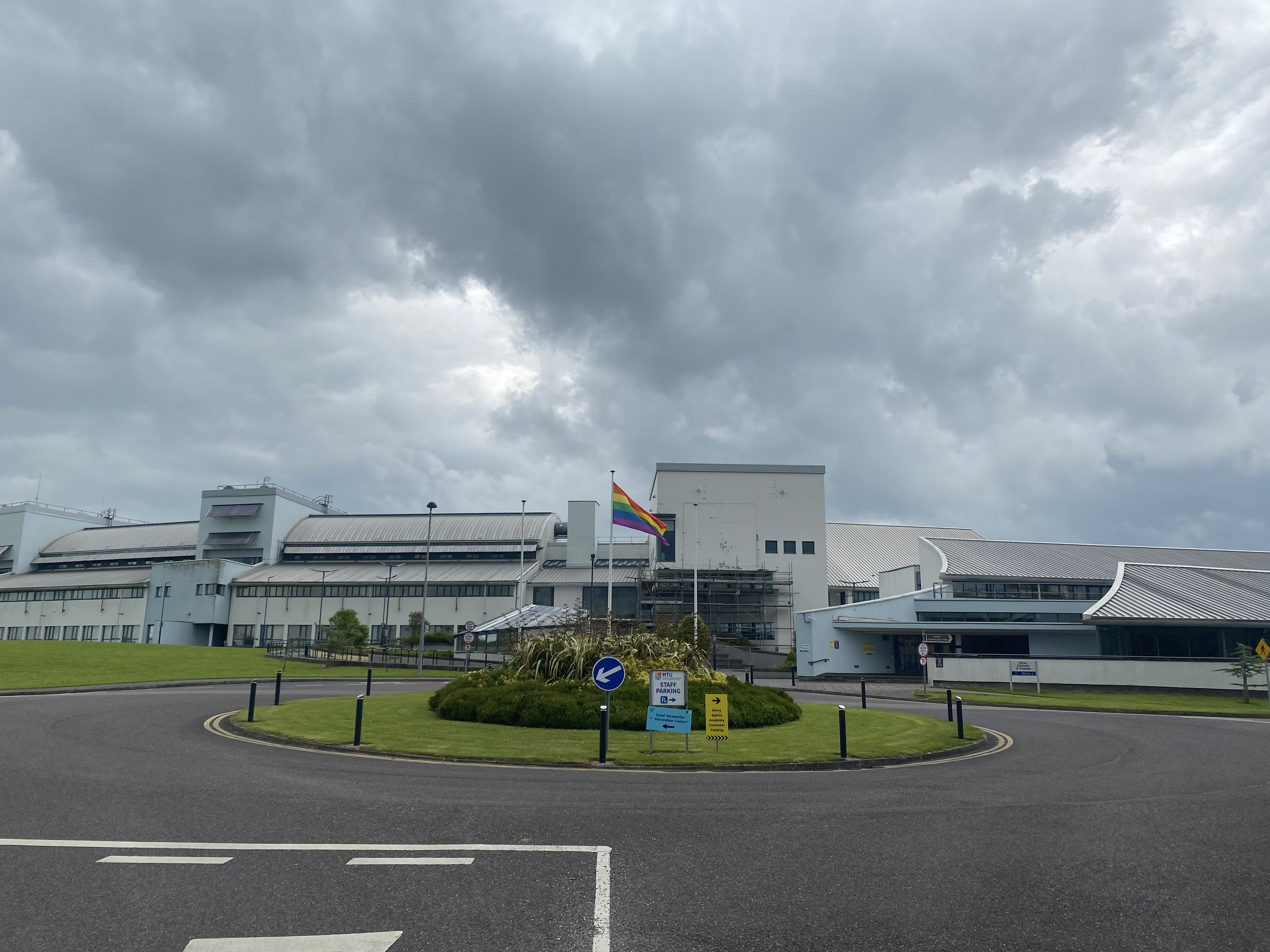
MTU Kerry North Campus, Tralee

From 2016, IT Tralee reportedly had plans to grow the North (Dromtacker) Campus, so that the smaller South (Clash) Campus could be closed. By 2025, both the North and South Campus were in operation.

In September 2019, the "Kerry Sports Academy" was opened in the North Campus. This facility has a large indoor sports hall, hydrotherapy suite, gym, lecturing facilities, aerobic and dance studios, and a massage suite. In February 2025, the facility's indoor sports hall was named after GAA broadcaster Mícheál Ó Muircheartaigh.

In November 2025, a new STEM building, named "An Cuan", was officially opened in the North Campus.

==== MTU Kerry South Campus ====
The South Campus was home to the School of Science, Technology, Engineering and Mathematics (STEM). As of August 2025, MTU had announced that, following the proposed development of a STEM facility at the North Campus, "all MTU students studying in Kerry" would be based at its North Campus.
