= Tim Ryan (rugby union, born 1984) =

Irish rugby union player

- Born: Timothy Ryan; 6 June 1984 (age 42) Cork, Ireland
- Height: 1.88 m (6 ft 2 in)
- Weight: 124 kg (19 st 7 lb)
- Notable relative(s): Dave Ryan; Paddy Ryan

Rugby union career
- Position: Tighthead Prop
Amateur team(s)
Years	Team	Apps	(Points)
2002-2004	Highfield	40	(76)
–	UCC	2	(0)
–	Cork Constitution	2	(10)
2015-2021	Highfield	80	(55)
Senior career
Years	Team	Apps	(Points)
2005–2009	Munster	14	(5)
2009–2010	Toulon	12	(5)
2010–2011	Newcastle Falcons	10	(0)
2011–2012	Cavalieri Prato	19	(0)
2012–2013	Dragons	8	(0)
2013–2014	Coventry		
International career
Years	Team	Apps	(Points)
2003	Ireland U19		
Coaching career
- Years: Team
- 2014–: Highfield

Tim Ryan (born 6 June 1984) is an Irish rugby union player/coach for Highfield. His position of choice is at tighthead prop. Ryan has played for Ireland U-19's, while his brother Dave Ryan is also a prop and formerly played for Munster.

Ryan started his underage rugby at Woodleigh Park for Highfield playing in the second row and won an All-Ireland U-16 title. After his successful stint in the second row he also played in the back row and then found his ideal position in the front row where he still makes good use of his pace and good handling skills. With time he was easily spotted and recruited by Munster Rugby and brought into their academy and also moved on to play with University College Cork RFC and then played in the AIL league with Cork Constitution, with whom he won the title in 2008. He moved to Toulon at the start of the 2009–10 Top 14 season on a 2-year contract. The incoming Toulon coach, Philippe Saint-Andre, was sufficiently impressed with Ryan's first half performance against the All Blacks at Thomond Park in November 2008 to recruit him. The All Blacks narrowly won the game in a tour they were undefeated against national sides.

In June 2010, Ryan signed for Newcastle Falcons from Toulon. He essentially swapped places with All Black legend Carl Hayman who had earlier moved from Newcastle to Toulon.

Ryan Signed for Rugby Club I Cavalieri Prato from Newcastle Falcons although it is not clear when this occurred.

In May 2012 Ryan joined Newport Gwent Dragons.
