= Dave Ryan (rugby union) =

Irish rugby union player

- Born: David Ryan; 21 April 1986 (age 40) Cork, Ireland
- Height: 1.83 m (6 ft 0 in)
- Weight: 113 kg (17.8 st; 249 lb)
- University: Cork Institute of Technology
- Notable relative(s): Tim Ryan; Paddy Ryan

Rugby union career
- Position: Prop
- Current team: SU Agen
Amateur team(s)
Years	Team	Apps	(Points)
2004-2008	Highfield	45	(58)
2008-2011	Dolphin	36	(20)
Senior career
Years	Team	Apps	(Points)
2009–2010	Munster	10	(0)
2011–2012	Lazio	19	(5)
2012–2014	Zebre	29	(0)
2014–2015	Ulster	0	(0)
2015–	SU Agen	156	(15)
- Correct as of 18 June 2022
International career
Years	Team	Apps	(Points)
2006	Ireland Under 20	3	(0)

Dave Ryan is an Irish professional rugby union player, currently playing for SU Agen in the French Top 14. Ryan plays as a prop. He previously played for Dolphin, Munster, Zebre and Lazio.

Ryan played for Munster between 2009 and 2010 after being promoted from a development contract.

It was announced in Spring 2011 that Ryan was leaving Munster to join Lazio Roma in Italy. He moved to Zebre for the 2012–13 season.

In April 2014, it was announced that he would join Ulster on a 2-year deal from the 2014–15 season.

Ryan was included in the USA preliminary squad for the summer tests during 2012, being eligible through his American mother, but turned down the chance as to continue playing professionally in Italy.
