= Bishopstown =

Bishopstown Baile an Easpaig
- Suburb
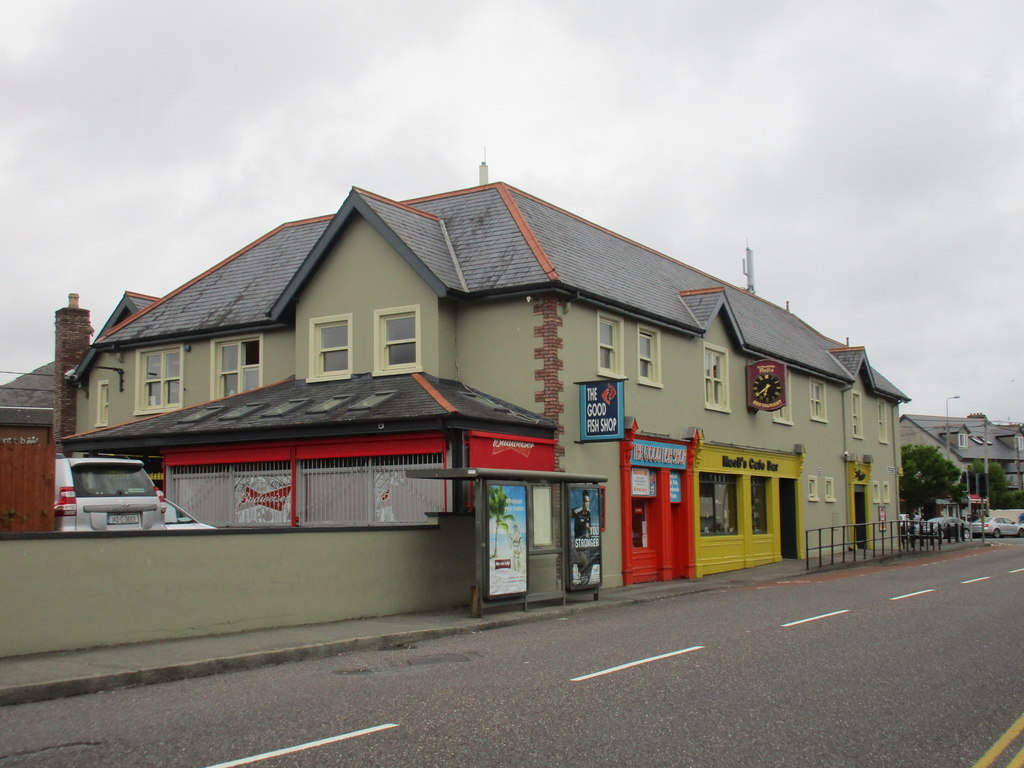
- Shops on Bishopstown Road

- Location in Ireland
- Coordinates: 51°52′38″N 8°31′50″W
- Country: Ireland
- Province: Munster
- City: Cork

Bishopstown (Irish: Baile an Easpaig, meaning 'town of the Bishop') is a suburb of Cork, located in the south west of the city. It is made-up of the townlands of Ballineaspigbeg and Ballineaspigmore (sometimes spelled Ballinaspigmore), and is located in the civil parish of St. Finbar's in the historical Barony of Cork. It is near the town of Ballincollig, a satellite of Cork City, and is home to a number of schools and colleges. It also borders the neighbouring suburbs of Wilton and Glasheen.

Though it is sometimes suggested that the name of the area derives from an early 18th-century bishop who built his country residence there, the name can be reputedly traced back further and found in sources dating to the 16th century.

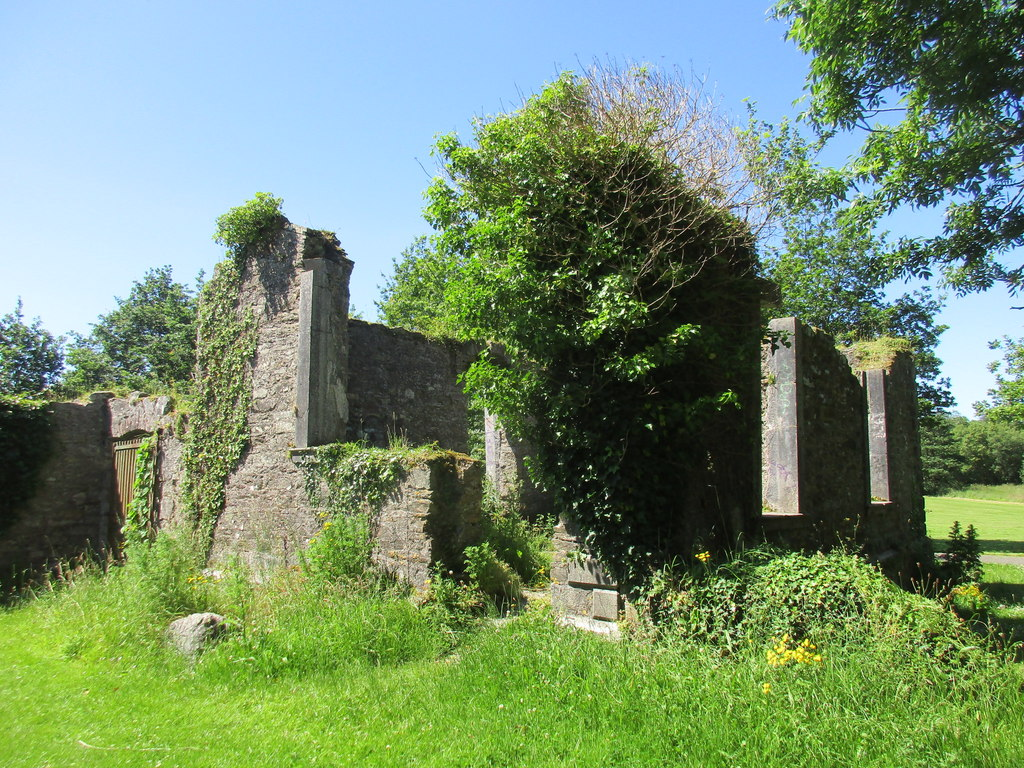
Ruined chapel on the grounds of the former Bishopstown House

== Education ==
The main Cork campus of the Munster Technological University (MTU) is located in the area. The secondary schools of Coláiste an Spioraid Naoimh, Mount Mercy College, and Bishopstown Community School are also located here, along with a number of other schools. Coláiste an Spioraid Naoimh is the biggest secondary school in Bishopstown with over 700 boy students.

Due to its proximity to MTU and University College Cork (UCC), Bishopstown is home to a student population who live in privately rented houses and student apartment complexes.

The 43rd Cork Scout Group is based in Bishopstown, and is a member of Scouting Ireland.

== Industry and employment ==
As a suburban area, Bishopstown has a significant proportion of its population working in Cork City Centre. The suburb has a number of retail centres such as Tesco, Aldi, Lidl, Dunnes Stores, MTU and a number of restaurants and bars in the centre of Bishopstown.

An IDA Ireland centre and the Cork Training Centre are also in the area, along with local business parks at Sarsfield Road and on Model Farm Road. Companies based there include Boston Scientific.

A research and innovation centre, Cork Science Park, is in development in Curraheen, on the western side of the Bishopstown.

== Sport ==
Local sports clubs include Bishopstown GAA and Highfield RFC.

Leisureworld Leisure Centre is located in the area, as is Bishopstown Stadium (a training ground for Cork City F.C. and home ground of Cork City W.F.C.).

== People ==
- Michael Bradley, former Irish rugby union player
- Jerry Buttimer, politician
- Brian Cuthbert, Gaelic footballer and manager
- Jimmy MacCarthy, Irish singer-songwriter
- Donncha O'Callaghan, Irish rugby union player
- Brendan O'Connor, journalist and television presenter
- Ronan O'Gara, Irish rugby union player
- Ken O'Halloran footballer, Gaelic footballer
- Jamie O'Sullivan footballer, Gaelic footballer
- Rubyhorse, music group
- Dave Ryan, Irish rugby player
- Timothy Ryan, Irish rugby player
- Michael Shields (footballer), Gaelic footballer
- John Spillane, singer-songwriter
- The Frank and Walters, music group
