= Freborg =

Freborg may refer to:

- Layton Freborg (1933–2026), American politician
- Freborg Homestead, historic farm in North Dakota, U.S.

== See also ==
- Freberg (disambiguation), another surname/nameplace
