= Kinnared =

Locality in Halland County, Sweden

- Locality
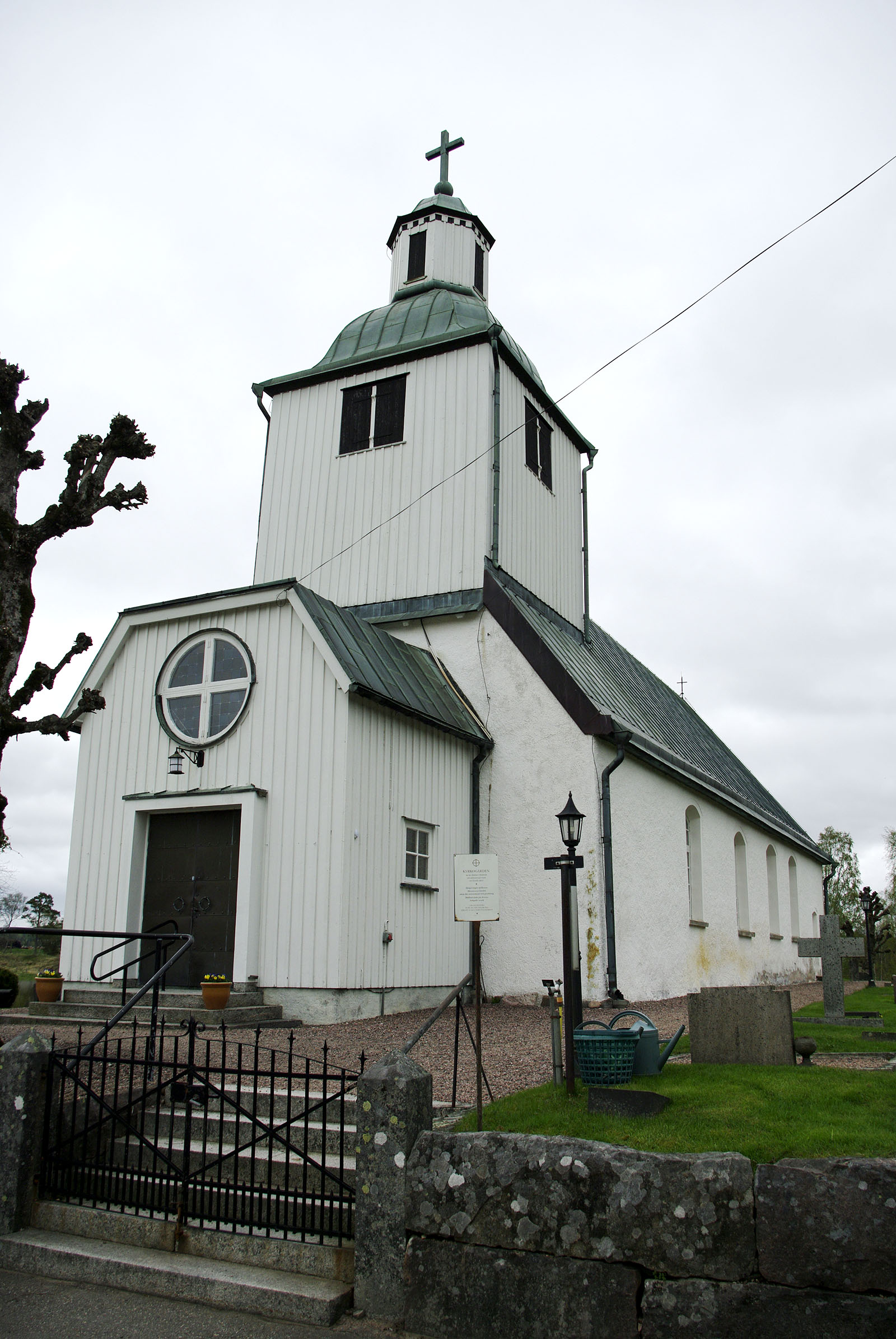
- Kinnared church

- Location within Halland Location within Sweden
- Coordinates: 57°01′30″N 13°06′34″E
- Country: Sweden
- Province: Halland
- County: Halland County
- Municipality: Hylte Municipality

Area
  - Total: 1.33 km^{2} (0.51 sq mi)

Population (31 December 2023)
  - Total: 295
  - Density: 222/km^{2} (574/sq mi)
- Time zone: UTC+1 (CET)
  - Summer (DST): UTC+2 (CEST)
- Postal code: 314 95
- Area code: 0345

Kinnared is a locality in Hylte Municipality, Halland County, Sweden. It is the traditional church village of Kinnared Parish in the historical province of Halland. The settlement developed around its railway station after the opening of the railway in 1877.

== Geography ==
Kinnared is situated in the valley where the rivers Västerån and Österån meet to form the river Kilan. The watercourses are part of the drainage basin of the river Nissan.

== History ==
=== Name and early settlement ===
The place name was recorded as Kynnariuth in 1298. The name derives from the farm of Kinnared, from which the parish later took its name. The first element may derive from the Old Danish word kin, meaning “cheek”, used here in the sense of a hillside or slope and possibly referring to the ridge south of the church. The suffix ryd means a woodland clearing.

The older settlement was concentrated around the farm and Kinnared Church. The church environment has medieval origins, and parts of a medieval stone church remain in the present building. The church is believed to have been constructed in the middle of the 13th century.

The parish hall near the church was built during the 1850s and was originally used as Kinnared's first school.

=== Administrative history ===
When Sweden's rural municipalities were established in 1863, Kinnared became a municipality of its own. Kinnared Rural Municipality was incorporated into Torup Rural Municipality in 1952. Torup subsequently became part of the present-day Hylte Municipality in 1974.

=== Railways and development ===
The Halmstad–Nässjö railway passes through Kinnared. The section between Halmstad and Värnamo, including Kinnared, opened for traffic in 1877. The entire line to Nässjö was completed in 1882. Kinnared halt opened in 1877 and was given station status around 1880. New buildings were constructed around the station, and Kinnared developed into a railway settlement.

The 11.5-kilometre Kinnared–Fegen Railway, a branch line between Kinnared and Fegen, opened in 1885. It was acquired by the Halmstad–Nässjö Railway company in 1886. Through its connection with the Fegen–Ätran Railway, Kinnared gained onward rail connections towards Varberg and Falkenberg. Traffic on the Kinnared–Fegen line ceased in 1961.

== Population ==
Kinnared's population increased from 272 in 1960 to a peak of 425 in 1980. It subsequently decreased to 287 in 2010, before rising to 319 in 2020. In 2023, the locality had 295 inhabitants.

Population of Kinnared
Year	Population
1960	272
1965	313
1970	368
1975	412
1980	425
1990	368
1995	322
2000	307
2005	297
2010	287
2015	309
2020	319
2023	295

== Community facilities ==
Kinnared has a grocery shop, a textile shop, a preschool, a primary school for pupils from preschool class to year six, and a sports hall.

Kinnared Church stands in the older church environment west of the railway settlement. The churchyard and the parish hall are situated next to the church.

== Transport and recreation ==
Kinnared railway station is situated on the railway between Halmstad and Nässjö. The locality also has road connections with Torup and Hyltebruk.

The Gislavedsleden hiking trail begins near Kinnared at the boundary between Halland and Jönköping County. It extends approximately 80 kilometres northwards to Isaberg and connects with the Hallandsleden trail to the south.

== Economy ==
Kinnared's economy includes sawmilling and the manufacture of automotive components and corrugated board.

Derome operates a sawmill, planing mill and wood-pellet plant in Kinnared. Gnotec Sweden has a production plant in the locality and manufactures metal components for the automotive industry. Kinnareds Well manufactures customised products from single-face corrugated board. Ballabo Maskin operates in forestry contracting, transport and subcontract manufacturing for the automotive industry.

Kinnareds Hembygdsförening, the local heritage association, was founded in 1977. It documents and communicates the area's history and cultural heritage. Its activities include village and churchyard walks, local-history evenings, Midsummer celebrations and heritage events. The association also participates in Kinnared Day and publishes local-history material in Kinnaredsbladet and through its digital archive.

Kinnareds Samhällsförening, the local community association, works with development issues and activities intended to strengthen the local community. Its activities have included community clean-up days, open-house events, Midsummer celebrations, Kinnared Day and Christmas decorations in the village square. The association has also worked with meeting places and activities for young people.

Kinnareds Stadsteater is a local theatre group which stages farces and other theatrical productions, including performances in connection with local railway and community events.
