= Fegen =

Fegen can refer to:

- Fegen (lake), a lake in southern Sweden
- Fegen (locality), a village situated on the southern shore of the lake
- Edward Stephen Fogarty Fegen (1891-1940), Irish Victoria Cross recipient

== See also ==
- Fegan, a surname
