= Freborg Homestead =

Coordinates: 47°26′39″N 101°15′10″W

- U.S. National Register of Historic Places
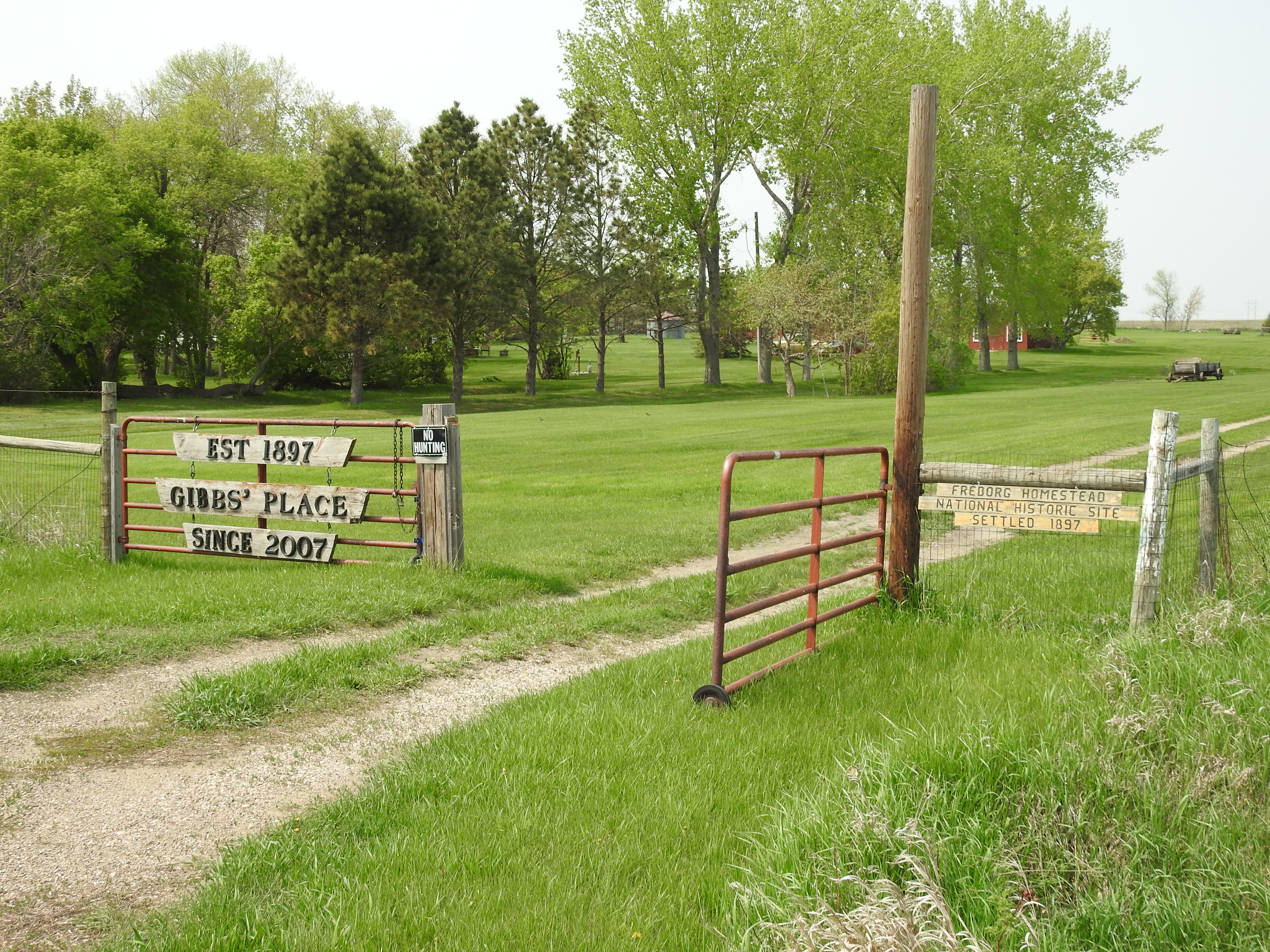

- Location within North Dakota Location within the United States
- Location: 3231 2nd St. NW, vicinity of Underwood, North Dakota
- Area: 10.5 acres (4.2 ha)
- NRHP reference No.: 14000625
- Added to NRHP: September 10, 2014

The Freborg Homestead near Underwood in McLean County, North Dakota was listed on the National Register of Historic Places in 2014. The listed property is 10.5 acres (4.2 ha) that includes the farm buildings, out of what once was a 160 acres (0.65 km^{2}) homestead.

It was the homestead of Swedish immigrant John Freborg, who took that last name after arriving in America, and his wife Alida Younquist, also a Swedish immigrant but whom he met in North Dakota, and eventually their children. They brought a daughter born in Bismarck and had six sons born on the homestead. The 160 acres (0.65 km^{2}) homestead was claimed in 1904 and proved up in 1905 or 1906, including by building a log home. A new frame house was built by 1906 in front of the original.

The Freborgs were eventually able to own a 1914 Overland touring car. John got sick and died relatively young; the Great Depression was hard on the family.

The house is a gable-front T-shaped residence with enclosed porches which is 26 by 33.5 feet (7.9 m × 10.2 m) in plan. The barn, built just before the house, is 60 by 46 feet (18 m × 14 m). Other structures are a chicken coop, a stock building, a granary, a grain bin, a granary/log cabin/equipment storage building, a triple garage, a smokehouse, a pump, and a windmill.

John was born in Svartaback, Linneryd, Sweden on December 20, 1871, and immigrated in 1893. Alida was born Landeryd, Sweden on November 16, 1878, her family brought her to the U.S. in 1883. They were married January 1, 1896.
