= Fegan =

Fegan is a last name that may refer to:

- Dan Fegan (1962–2018), prominent NBA agent
- J. W. C. Fegan (1852–1925), English evangelist and orphanage founder
- John Fegan (politician) (1862–1932), Australian politician
- John Fegan (actor) (1908–1981), Australian film and television actor
- John Fegan (rugby union) (1872–1949), English rugby union player*
- Owen Fegan (born 1972), Irish artist
- Roy Fegan (born 1961), American actor
- Roshon Fegan (born 1991), American actor

== See also ==
- Fegan Floop, a fictional character in the Spy Kids film series
- Fegen (disambiguation)
