= Rydöbruk =

- Location within Halland Location within Sweden
- Coordinates: 56°57′N 13°09′E
- Country: Sweden
- Province: Halland and Småland
- County: Halland County
- Municipality: Hylte Municipality

Area
  - Total: 1.14 km^{2} (0.44 sq mi)

Population (31 December 2010)
  - Total: 388
  - Density: 341/km^{2} (880/sq mi)
- Time zone: UTC+1 (CET)
  - Summer (DST): UTC+2 (CEST)

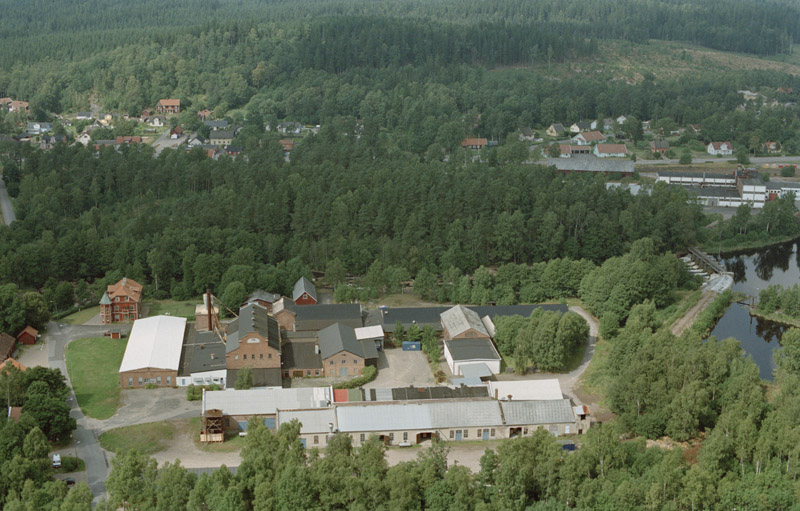
Rydöbruk in 1997

Rydöbruk (Swedish pronunciation: [rʏdœˈbrʉːk]) is a locality situated in Hylte Municipality, Halland County, Sweden with 388 inhabitants in 2010.
