= Parry Auto Company =

1910s American car manufacturer

- Industry: Automobile
- Founded: 1910
- Founder: David Maclean Parry
- Defunct: 1912
- Fate: Bankrupt
- Headquarters: Indianapolis, Indiana, USA
- Products: Open touring car

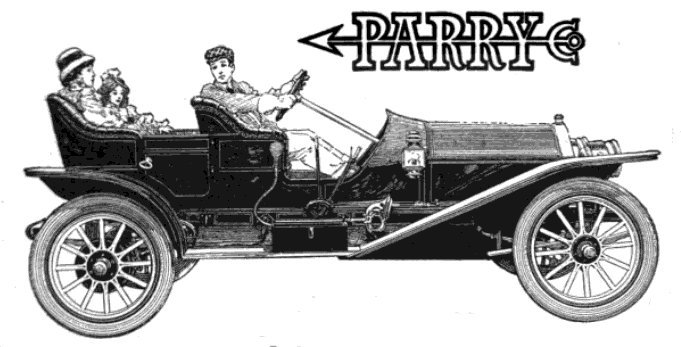
1911 Parry Model 37

The Parry (1910) and New Parry (1911–1912) were both Brass Era cars built in Indianapolis, Indiana, by the Parry Auto Company. During that time, they produced 3500 vehicles. Two cars are known to exist. A Model 40 from 1910 and a Model 41 from 1911.

== Origin ==
David Parry was the third generation of Parrys to settle in America; his grandfather, Henry Parry, was a Welsh engineer who moved to Pittsburgh, Pennsylvania. Thomas Parry was born in Pittsburgh in 1822 and traveled to Indiana to begin farming. He married Lydia McLane and had five children during this time. David M Parry was born on March 26, 1852, on the family farm near Laurel, Indiana, and grew up there. At the age of 16, Parry began working in the hardware business and worked his way up to owning his hardware store in New York, which he ultimately sold to aid his father in 1882. David's wife of seven years, Cora, died the same year, leaving him with young children. He went to Indiana and bought a stake in the Woodburn Charvin wheelworks, where he began constructing farm tools.

David Parry hired his brothers Thomas, Saint Clair, and his brother Edward as the firm grew swiftly. During this period, Parry married Hessie Maxwell, and the company was renamed the Parry Manufacturing Company, which had grown from 40 to 2400 employees. They had a total of nine children, seven of whom were born to them. The Parry manufacturing company was most known for selling horse-drawn buggies worldwide. Parry would occasionally travel worldwide with his family, promoting both US products and Parry buggies. The Parry manufacturing company would transition from buggies to car truck bodywork, primarily Ford Model T and Model TT vehicles.

His brothers and partners in the Parry Manufacturing Company preferred to stay with carriages. These same brothers would later finance the Comet cyclecar. In 1919, they joined the Martin firm to form Parry Martin, which was later purchased and amalgamated with General Motors' Chevrolet subsidiary to produce truck bodywork.

== Overland ==
David's first involvement with automobiles was one of Henry Ford's early investors. Later, he was connected with the Overland Automobile Company, a part-owner and president from 1906 to 1909 when John Willis sold the company. In 1909, Parry sold his remaining land shares to Willis, later overseeing the successful Overland automobile's construction. Parry then began planning for his own motor company, which he founded in July 1909.

In 1906, David Parry gained control of the Overland Company, and thus officially got into the auto business. By 1908, he sold the company to John North Willys, since Parry had lost everything, including his house, in the Panic of 1907.

== Parry Auto Company ==
In 1909, David Parry announced the formation of the Parry Auto Company, based in the former Standard Wheel Company buildings in South Indianapolis. On July 28, 1909, the firm was incorporated, with aspirations to produce 5000 cars in the first year. David Parry, William Teasdale, Parry's son-in-law, Warren Oaks, another son-in-law, and Maxwell Parry, Parry's son, were the company officers.

The beginning payroll included 389 employees, but the company laid plans to expand that number to 3000. "Now, if the Parry Auto Company can turn out 5,000 cars for the year 1910, it will have established a world's record for the first year of any such business," David Parry stated.

Only two models would be available for the 1910 model year. Although they had stated that they would produce 35 cars per day to reach 5000 units, production had only reached about ten vehicles per day by November 1909, and by February 1910, production had only reached about 18 cars per day.

=== Model 40 (1910) ===
The touring would be blue, while the roadster would be gray. The critical components of a four-cylinder Parry motor was a 4.25-inch bore and 4.5-inch stroke, a recycling splash oiling system, a high-tension magneto, and a specially developed Schebler carburetor were the critical components of the 1910 Parry. A butterfly accelerator valve and flange attachment were included in this particular carburetor. The car's rims were 27 inches in diameter. The roadster and touring models were priced at $1285 and $1485, respectively, and included leather facing cone clutches and expanding internal bands for emergency brakes.

== New Parry ==
The Parry automotive manufacturer began advertising his new 1911 models in May 1909. There were eight different vehicle models advertised in total. It's unlikely that any of these cars were made because, by December 1910, the company had run into financial difficulties and had gone into receivership. Under the supervision of W Teasdale, a former Parry vice president, the company was transformed into a motor vehicle manufacturing corporation. On January 19, 1911, the factory reopened for business. There are references to roughly 2500 1911 Parry autos being made. Therefore, the 1910 and 1911 Parry automobiles would be the only two models built.

The car was renamed the New Parry under the Motor Car Manufacturing Company. The New Parry was built on the original Parry chassis, and the radiator was branded with the New Parry logo. The Pathfinder vehicles and the New Parry were made in the same factory. However, the motor car manufacturing firm shifted its concentration to the Pathfinder automobile in early 1912, and its name was subsequently changed to Pathfinder automotive factory.

== Engine ==
The Parry automobile was most likely a semi-assembled vehicle. The radiator, fenders, and body were all built by Parry, as were the front axle and transmission. Similar to the 1909 Cadillac model 30, the rear axle was constructed by American ballbearing. The Kurts magneto was bought from the Hercules magneto firm. The engine is nearly identical to the Buick Model 19 from 1910, which was a car that was made about the same time as the Parry model 40. The resemblance indicates that either Parry bought an engine and copied it or bought the engine designs and was given permission to produce and install the machine in their vehicles. However, there are a few differences between the Buick and Parry engines, such as differences in the intake and exhaust manifolds, the lack of Buick part numbers on cast parts, differences in the water manifolds, and the fan mounting bracket and the oil pad casting appearing to be thicker to strengthen it. The camshaft is also altered, as is the front engine cover.

== Racing ==
In 1910, Parry entered the Glidden Tour. The company did not do well, and a lawsuit was threatened due to a disagreement between Parry and Glidden organizers about how performance times were measured. The committee threatened to remove Parry from the competition if he did not abandon his concerns, and Parry did so. The firm also took part in the 1910 desert rally, which ran from Los Angeles to Phoenix, Arizona. It made it to the end, but it didn't win.

== Distribution ==
Automobiles made by Parry were sold in the United States and internationally. They were Parry dealers in Los Angeles, New York City, Detroit, and Colorado.

The Parry was likely sponsored by the Los Angeles dealership in the Los Angeles to Phoenix desert rally. Multiple Los Angeles Sunday Herald articles about the car being driven by ladies were arranged by the Los Angeles dealership. In addition, at least five 1910 Parry autos were sold to Puerto Rico and 13 to Australia, most likely due to David Parry's international connections.

== Demise ==
The company was only in operation for 18 months, and whereas many businesses failed due to poor product or marketing, the Parry company was mismanaged. There were only 900 cars sold in 1910, thus resulting in a substantial loss. The company was in receivership by late December 1910.

The last Parry vehicles were most likely constructed in early 1912.

Parry contracted a condition that caused his kidneys to fail while on tour to Korea, Japan, and Hawaii in 1909 and died on May 12, 1919, at the age of 63, at his residence in Golden Hill.

== See also ==
- Classic Speedsters - The Parry
