= Hylte Municipality =

Hylte Municipality Hylte kommun
- Municipality
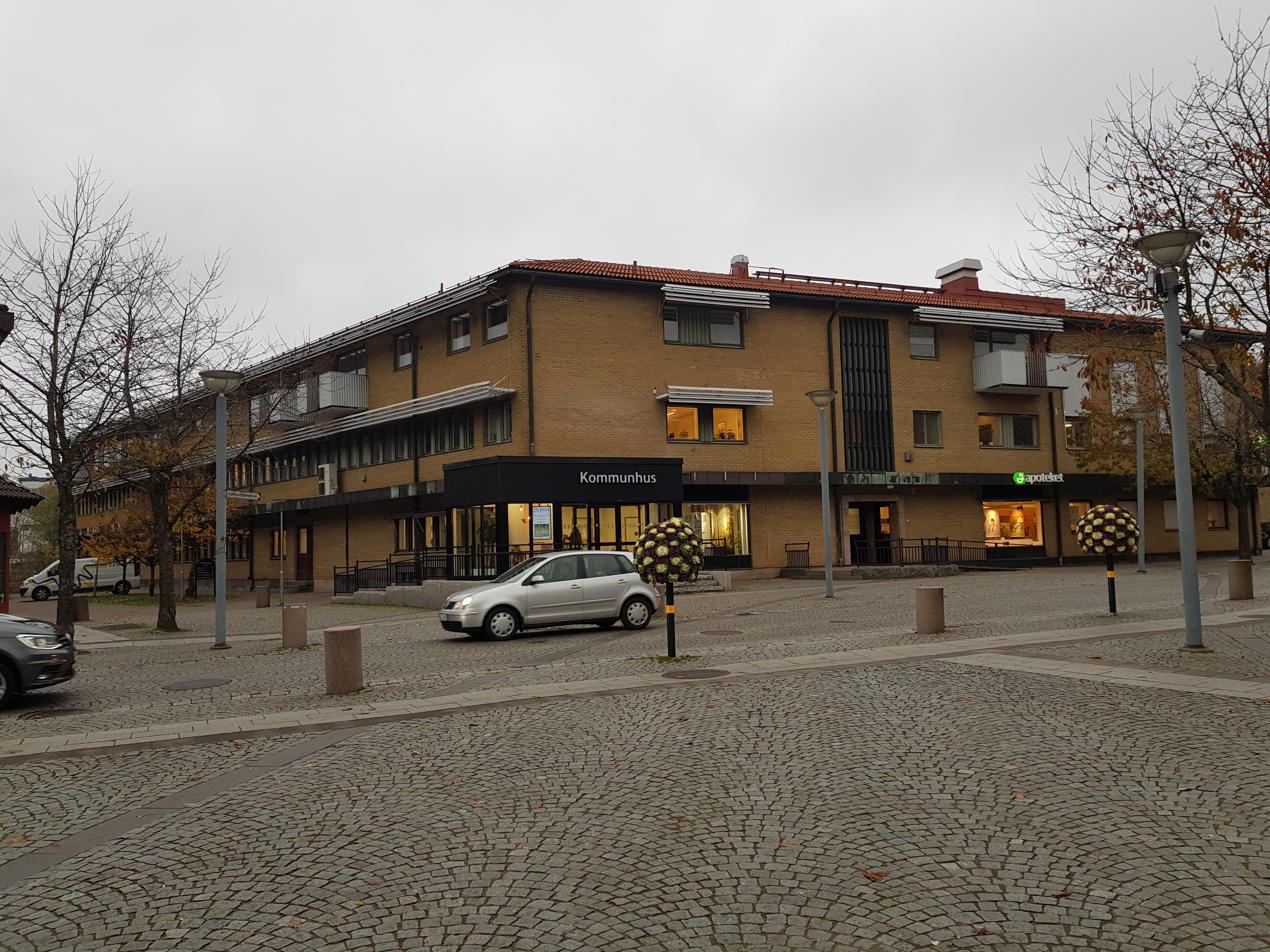
- Hylte town hall

- Coat of arms

- Coordinates: 57°00′N 13°15′E
- Country: Sweden
- County: Halland County
- Seat: Hyltebruk

Area
  - Total: 1,046.59 km^{2} (404.09 sq mi)
  - Land: 946.08 km^{2} (365.28 sq mi)
  - Water: 100.51 km^{2} (38.81 sq mi)
- Area as of 1 January 2014.

Population (30 June 2025)
  - Total: 10,166
  - Density: 10.745/km^{2} (27.830/sq mi)
- Time zone: UTC+1 (CET)
  - Summer (DST): UTC+2 (CEST)
- ISO 3166 code: SE
- Province: Halland and Småland
- Municipal code: 1315
- Website: www.hylte.se

Hylte Municipality (Swedish: Hylte kommun) is the only inland municipality of Halland County in southwest Sweden. The industrial town Hyltebruk is the seat of the municipality.

The first Hylte Municipality was created in 1952 through the amalgamation of three minor units in Jönköping County. In 1974 further amalgamations took place and the county boundary was redrawn.

== Geography ==
The municipality straddles the boundary of two historic provinces, Halland and Småland.

=== Localities ===
There are 6 urban areas (also called a Tätort or locality) in Hylte Municipality.

In the table the localities are listed according to the size of the population as of December 31, 2005. The municipal seat is in bold characters.

#	Locality	Population
1	**Hyltebruk**	3,742
2	Torup	1,239
3	Unnaryd	760
4	Rydöbruk	385
5	Landeryd	372
6	Kinnared	297

== Demographics ==
This is a demographic table based on Hylte Municipality's electoral districts in the 2022 Swedish general election sourced from SVT's election platform, in turn taken from SCB official statistics.

In total there were 10,590 residents, including 7,442 Swedish citizens of voting age. 44.1% voted for the left coalition and 55.0% for the right coalition. Indicators are in percentage points except population totals and income.

Location	Residents	Citizen adults	Left vote	Right vote	Employed	Swedish parents	Foreign heritage	Income SEK	Degree
Location			%	%					
Hyltebruk	1,218	879	51.4	47.7	67	56	44	18,852	22
Kinnared-Drängsered	1,013	723	36.6	62.1	79	78	22	23,897	27
Landeryd-Långaryd	1,293	963	41.2	57.8	84	86	14	25,671	28
Rydöbruk-Femsjö	841	578	38.3	61.5	78	73	27	23,231	27
Staffansbo	1,491	1,073	46.1	53.5	83	70	30	25,927	24
Torup	1,706	1,256	44.4	54.7	78	76	24	23,022	27
Unnaryd-Jälluntofta	1,238	870	43.7	55.2	80	71	29	22,583	29
Örnabäckshult	1,790	1,100	47.9	50.8	72	45	55	23,157	21
Source: SVT

== Notable people ==
- Elias Magnus Fries (1794–1878), mycologist and botanist
