= Overland Automobile =

Former American car manufacturer

Coordinates: 39.758764°N 86.176673°W

Overland Auto Company Willys-Overland Company
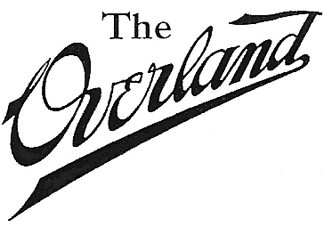

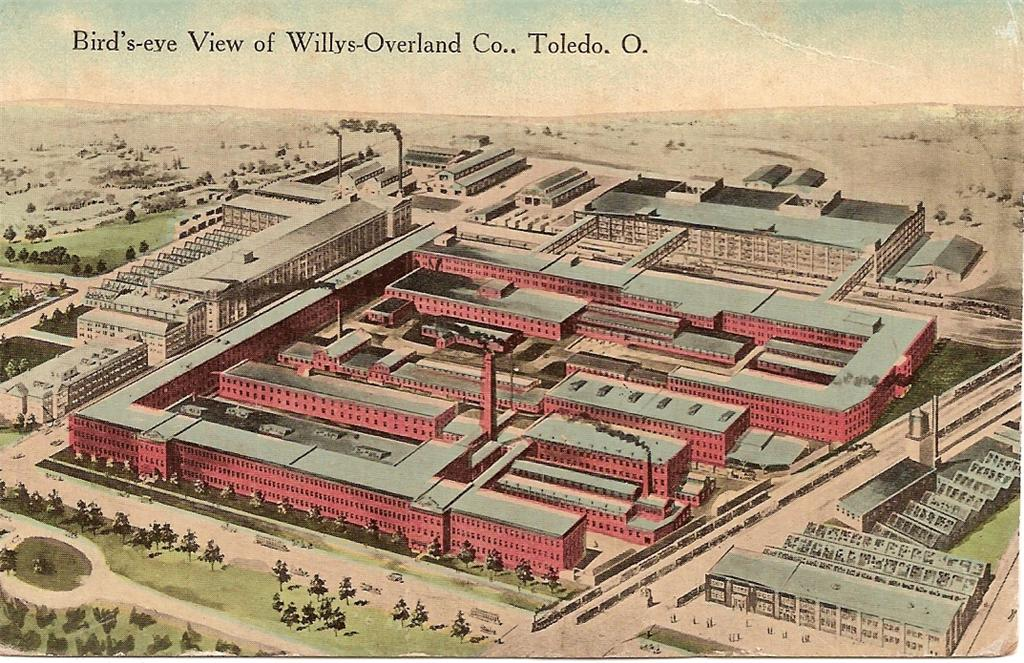
- Willys-Overland Factory - 1915 postcard
- Company type: Automobile Manufacturing
- Industry: Automotive
- Founded: 1903; 123 years ago
- Founder: Claude E. Cox
- Defunct: 1926; 100 years ago
- Fate: Merger
- Successor: Willys-Overland
- Headquarters: Indianapolis, Indiana and Toledo, Ohio
- Key people: Claude E. Cox, David M. Parry, John North Willys, Clarence A. Earl

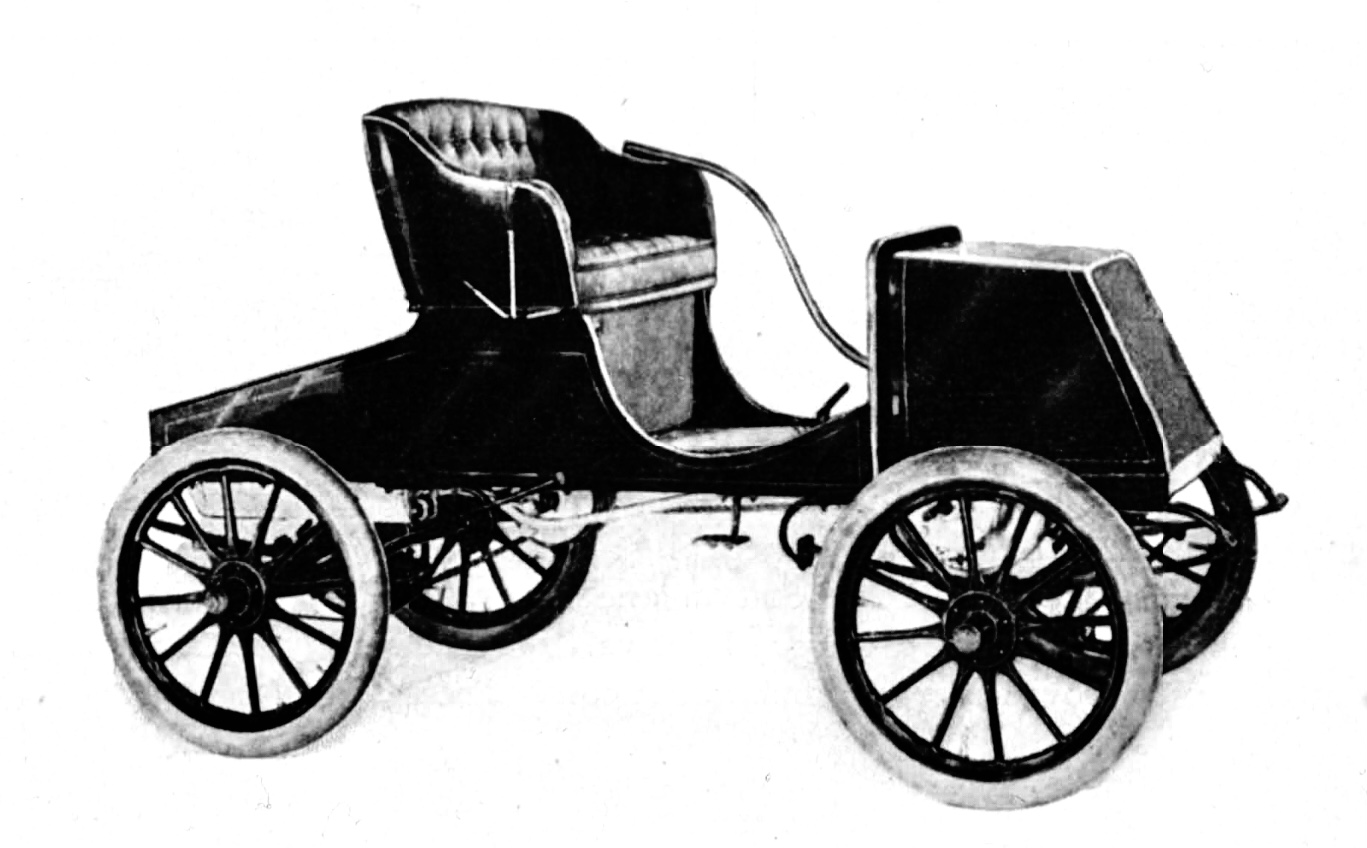
The very first Overland from 1903 was the Model 13 with 5 HP from a single-cylinder engine with 552 cc, featuring a bore of 88.9 mm and a stroke of 88.9 mm.

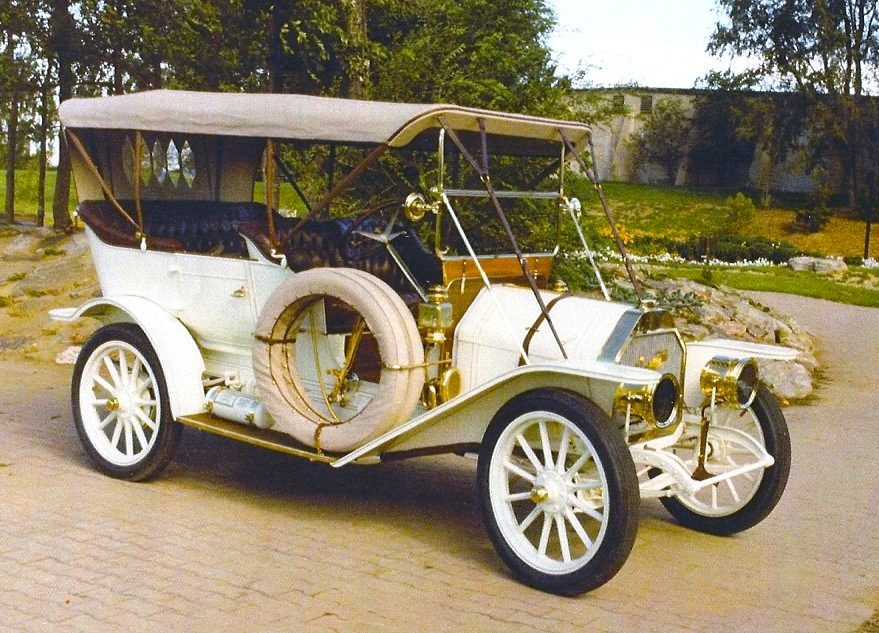
1910 Overland Model 42 Touring Car

The Overland Automobile Company was an American automobile manufacturer in Toledo, Ohio. It was the founding company of Willys-Overland and one of the earliest mass producers of automobiles.

== History ==
The Overland Automobile department was founded in Terre Haute, Indiana, by Claude E. Cox, when Charles Minshall of Standard Wheel Company decided to expand into automobile manufacturing. Standard Wheel were major suppliers of wheels to the carriage industry. Cox, a recent graduate of Rose Polytechnic Institute, developed a gasoline runabout in 1903.

Cox's runabout was an advanced design with a water-cooled 5-hp vertical single-cylinder engine mounted up front under a hood, rather than under the seat which was common practice. It featured a jump-spark ignition and a two-speed planetary transmission operated by a foot pedal. Priced at $595 (equivalent to $21,321 in 2025), 11 were built in 1903, doubling to 23 in 1904 when a two-cylinder engine was introduced. Claude Cox continued development adding a 16-hp four-cylinder engine, shaft-drive instead of chain and a steering wheel instead of a tiller, by 1905.

In 1905, Standard Wheel moved Overland production to Indianapolis, Indiana, but decided to leave automobile production and sold Overland to Claude Cox for $8,000, equivalent to $286,667 in 2025. David M. Parry became a 51% investor and formed the Overland Auto Company. Overland production was now in an extension of Parry's buggy factory. Now producing two models, production was only 37 cars in 1905 because of the moves, and in 1906, production increased to 47, all sold to John North Willys, a car dealer in Elmira, New York.

The 1907 Panic caused David Parry to go bankrupt, including the loss of his house. By 1910, he had recovered enough to start the Parry Auto Company. J. N. Willys arrived in Indianapolis to protect his investment and ended up taking over Overland Auto Company.

In 1908, control of Overland was purchased by J. N. Willys, and he managed to increase production that year to 467 Overlands. Overlands were rationalized to one design of a 24 hp four-cylinder car on two different wheelbases selling for $1,295, equivalent to $46,404 in 2025. In 1909, the production soared to 4,907 Overlands, and Claude Cox left for Inter-State and later to form his own laboratory business (now Testek, Inc.) in Detroit. In 1909, the Pope-Toledo factory was purchased and Overland moved to Toledo.

Production continued to grow, and Overland remained a top three U. S. automobile manufacturer through 1919. In 1912, it was renamed Willys-Overland Company. Overland models expanded in the mid-price automobile market until 1917, when a new $500 (equivalent to $12,565 in 2025) Overland to challenge the Model T Ford was announced. A disastrous strike delayed introduction until 1919, when it was priced at $845 (equivalent to $15,692 in 2025) with electric lights and a self-starter. Willys revised this car to the Blue Bird and Red Bird models, which helped Willys-Overland return to strength following a Receivership. Willys-Overland continued to use the Overland marque until 1926, when it became the Overland Whippet and then Willys Whippet.

== Models ==
| Year | Model |
|---|---|
| 1903 | Model 13 |
| 1904 | Model 13, Model 15 |
| 1905 | Model 15, Model 17, Model 18 |
| 1906 | Model 16, Model 18 |
| 1907 | Model 22 |
| 1908 | Model 24 |
| 1909 | Model 30, Model 31, Modell 32, Model 34 |
| 1910 | Model 38, Model 40, Model 41, Model 42 |
| 1911 | 20 hp, 25 hp, 30 hp, 40 hp |
| 1912 | Model 58, Model 59, Model 60, Model 61 |

== Media ==
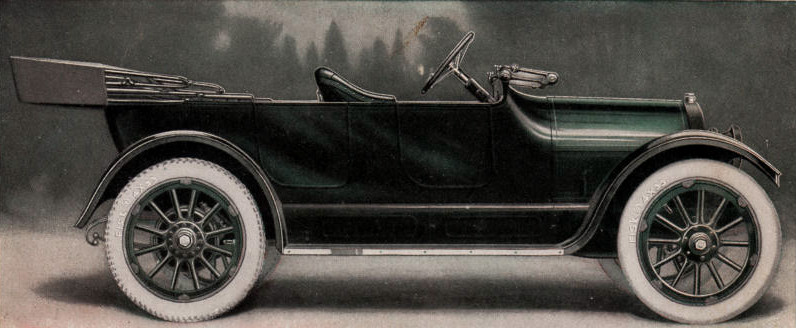
Model 83, produced between 1915 and 1916.

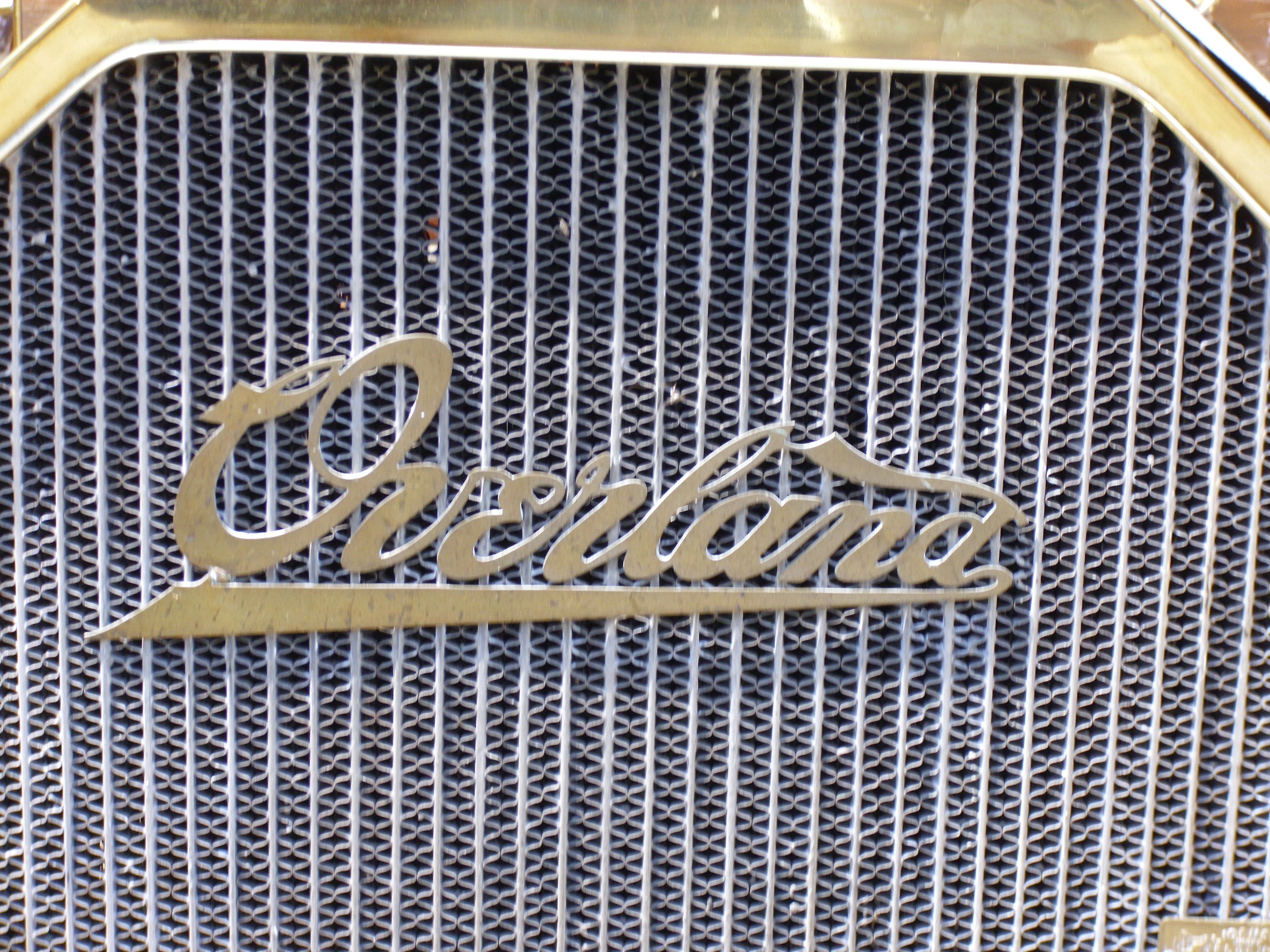
Logo on 1910 radiator

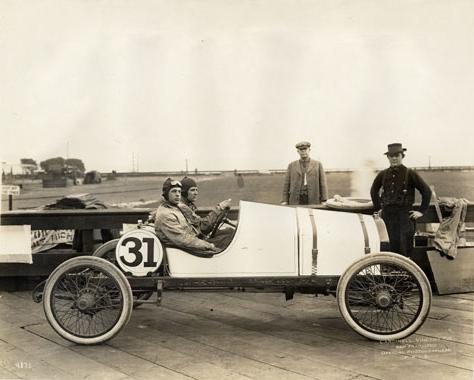
Tom McKelvey in his Overland race car before the 1915 American Grand Prize at San Francisco

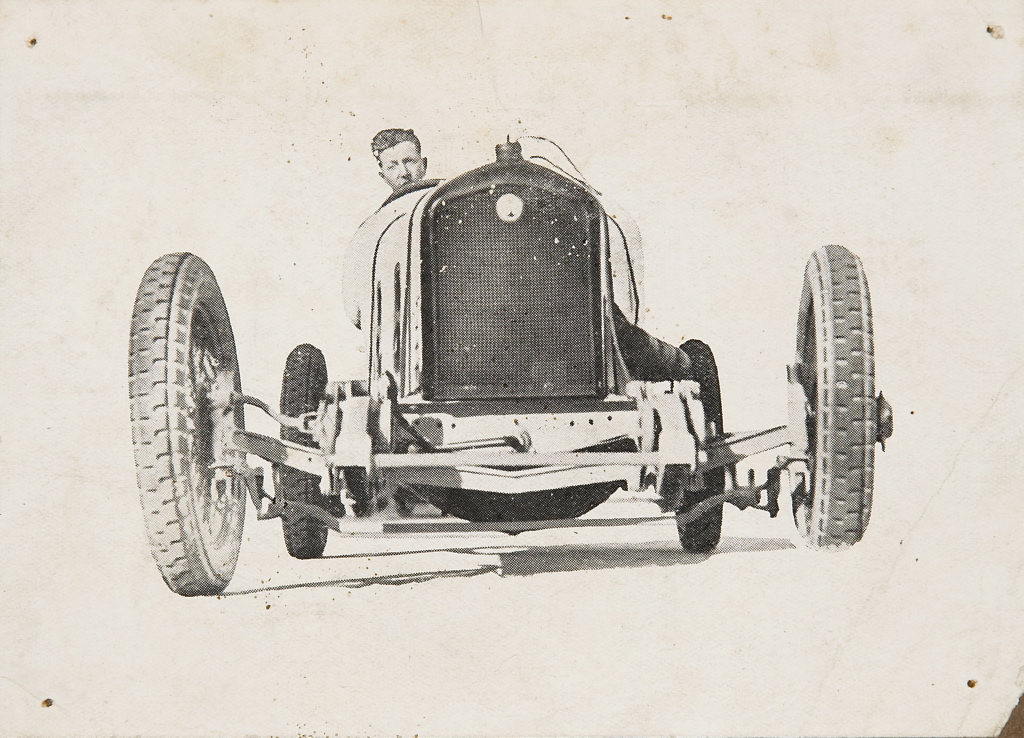
D.J. Harkness at the wheel of an Overland Sports car, 1920 - 1929

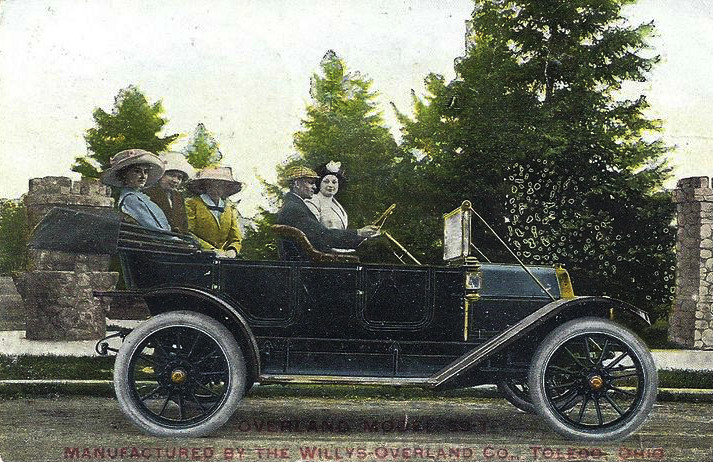
Model 59T, 1912.

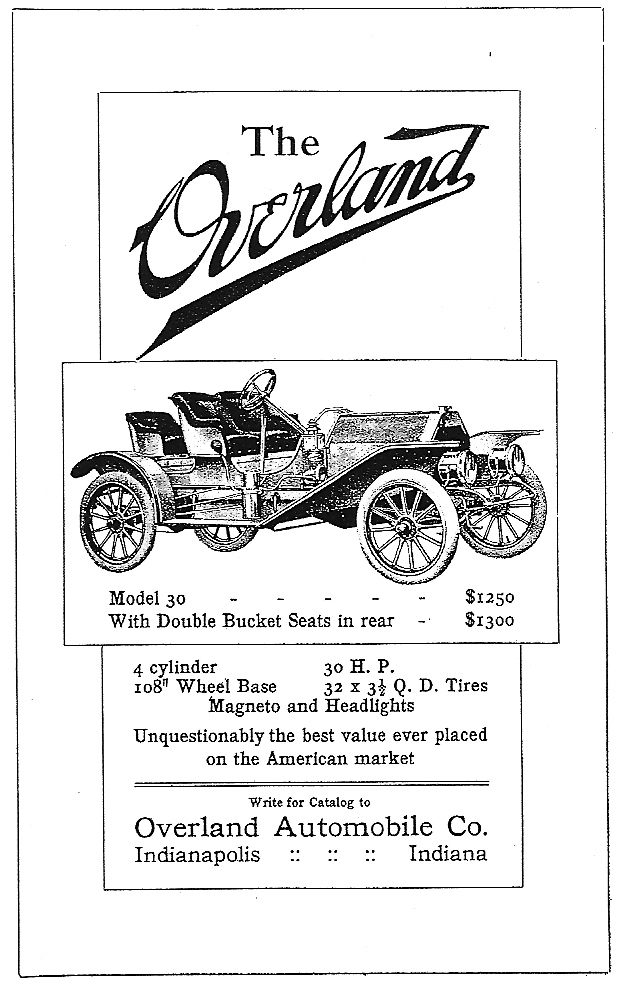
1909 Overland Automobile Advertisement

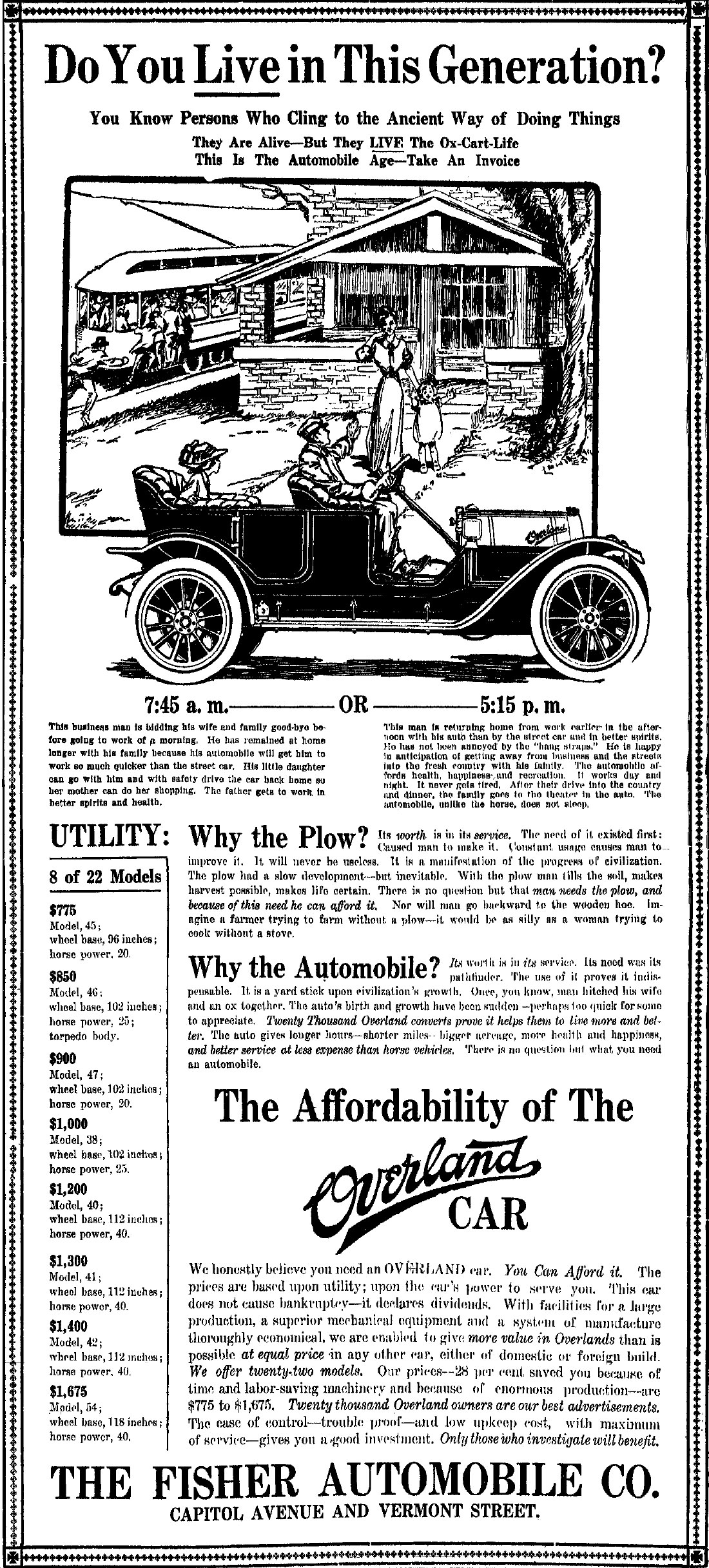
Ad. from Indianapolis Star, Nov. 27, 1910

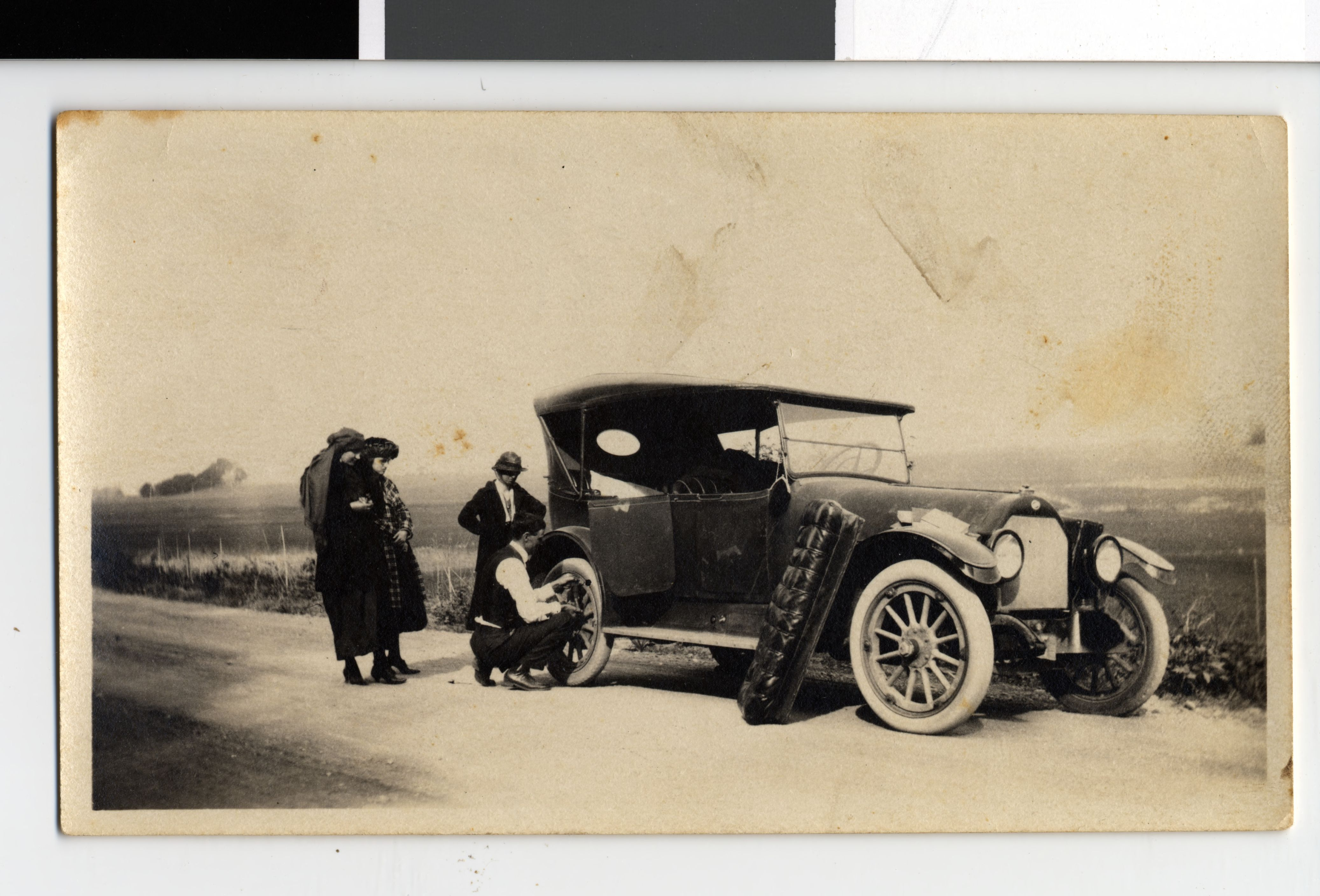
Edward J. Naylor repairing a tire on a 1913 Overland Touring Car, Blue Earth County, Minnesota

One of the more unusual uses of an Overland was in 1911 when Milton Reeves used a 1910 model to create his 8-wheel Octo-Auto, his eight-wheel car.

The last vestige of the Overland automobile empire remains in the form of bricks spelling out "Overland" in the smoke stack at the Toledo factory that once formed the core of Willys automotive empire. But the name would come back when DaimlerChrysler (Now Fiat Chrysler Automobiles) introduced the Overland name for a trim package on the 2002–present (except 2005 model year) Jeep Grand Cherokee. The badging is a recreation of the Overland nameplate from the early twentieth century.
