= Unnaryd =

- Location within Halland Location within Sweden
- Coordinates: 56°57′N 13°31′E
- Country: Sweden
- Province: Småland
- County: Halland County
- Municipality: Hylte Municipality

Area
  - Total: 1.26 km^{2} (0.49 sq mi)

Population (31 December 2010)
  - Total: 759
  - Density: 603/km^{2} (1,560/sq mi)
- Time zone: UTC+1 (CET)
  - Summer (DST): UTC+2 (CEST)

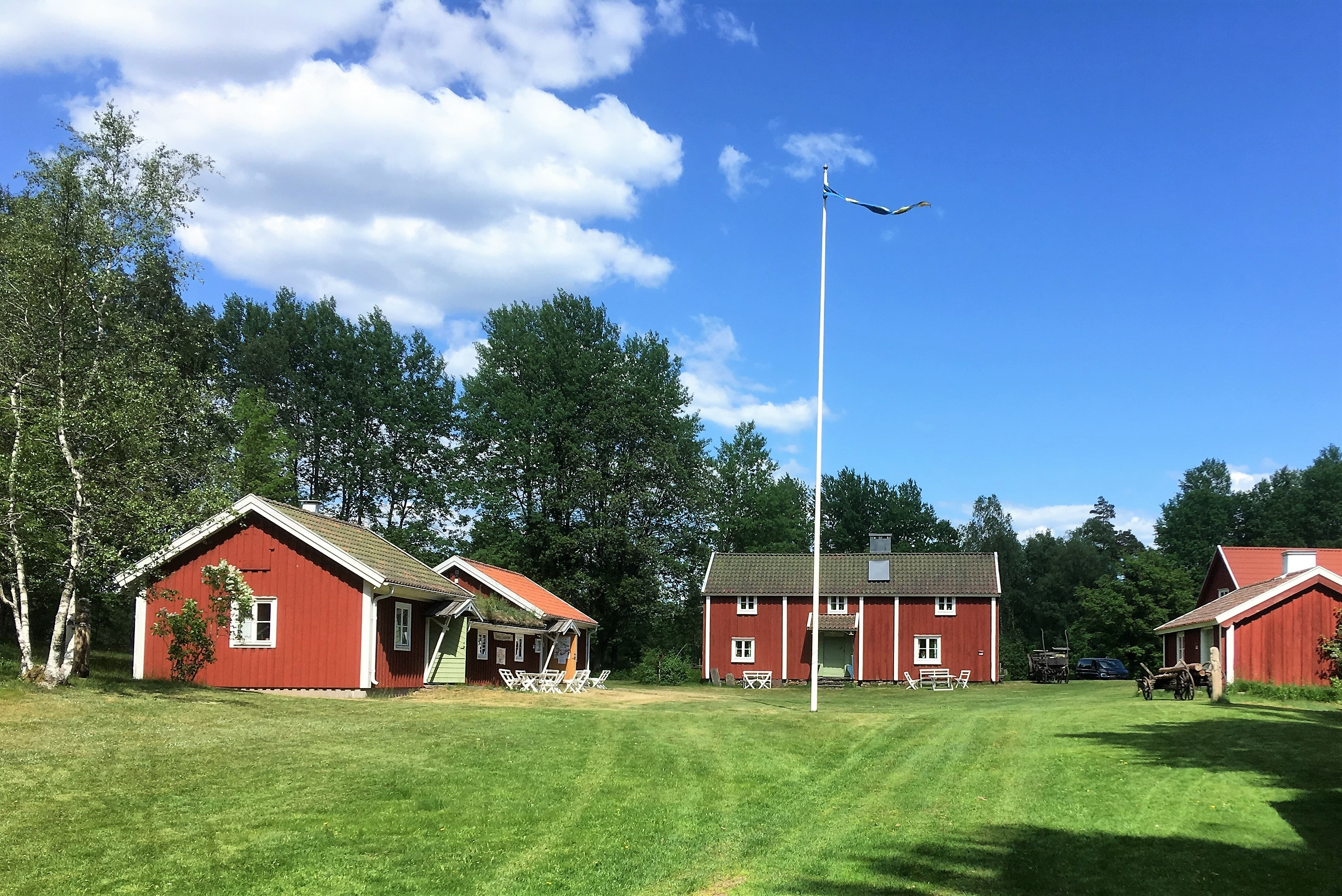
Unnaryd Local Heritage Centre

Unnaryd is a locality situated in Hylte Municipality, Halland County, Sweden with 759 inhabitants in 2010.
