= Hyltebruk =

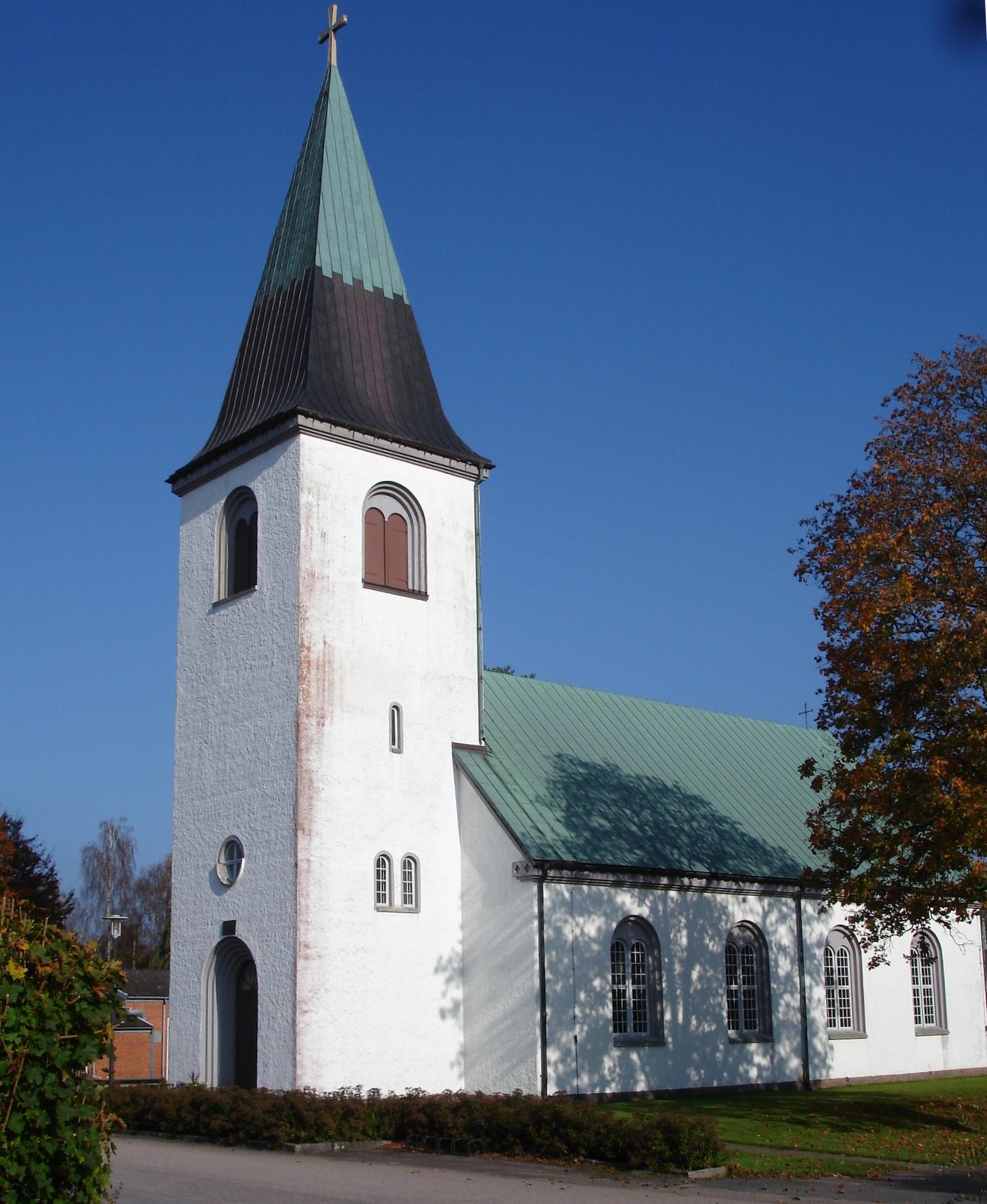
- Hyltebruk Church

- Location within Halland Location within Sweden
- Coordinates: 57°00′00″N 13°14′30″E
- Country: Sweden
- Province: Småland
- County: Halland County
- Municipality: Hylte Municipality

Area
  - Total: 4.91 km^{2} (1.90 sq mi)

Population (31 December 2010)
  - Total: 3,716
  - Density: 756/km^{2} (1,960/sq mi)
- Time zone: UTC+1 (CET)
  - Summer (DST): UTC+2 (CEST)

Hyltebruk (Swedish: [hʏltɛˈbrʉːk]) is a locality and the seat of Hylte Municipality, Halland County, Sweden with 3,716 inhabitants in 2010.

The town grew up around the paper mill owned by Hylte Bruks AB, which started its operation in 1907. A railway was built in 1909 connecting it with Torup on the Halmstad-Nässjö line. The paper mill today has nearly 1,000 employees and is one of the greatest manufacturers of newsprint in the world.

In the 20th century the town was popular due to the farming it had produced that had led to increased tourist sites and also now has opened several different hotels in its regions to attract more tourists in the spring and summer seasons.
