= Pathfinder (1912 automobile) =

Defunct motor vehicle manufacturer

Motor Car Manufacturing Company Pathfinder Company
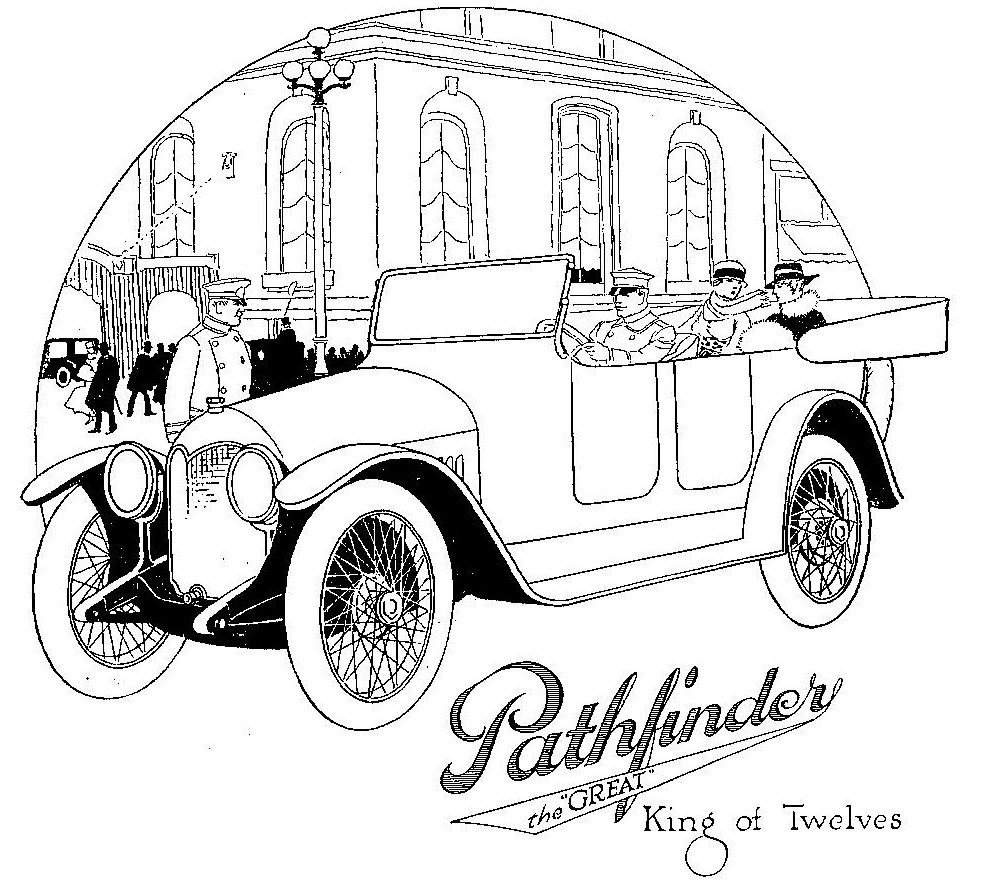
- Formerly: Parry Auto Company
- Type: Automobile manufacturer
- Industry: Automotive
- Founded: 1912; 114 years ago
- Defunct: 1917; 109 years ago
- Fate: Bankruptcy
- Headquarters: Indianapolis, IN, United States
- Key people: W. C. Teasdale
- Products: Automobiles

Pathfinder advertisement (1913)

The Pathfinder was a Brass Era car built in Indianapolis, Indiana from 1912 to 1917.

== History ==
After the Parry Auto Company passed into receivership in 1910, the Motor Car Manufacturing Company was created by its creditors. That particular name was chosen as they had not decided what to name their new automobile. Indeed, the New Parry continued to be produced until a little after the new Pathfinder was introduced in 1912. Board members included former or then-current officials from the Parry Auto Company, Dayton Motor Car Company, American Ball Bearing Company, and Standard Oil. Great things were expected from such a strong group of businessmen.

One of the advertising slogans of the Pathfinder was "known for reliability," but an equally high emphasis was placed on the appearances of the vehicles themselves. Examples of the latter included a boattail speedster (nearly two decades before the more famous Auburn of the same layout), a paneled storage area for the roadster's top, and vibrant paint color combinations.

The Royal Automobile Club of England issued a certificate of performance to the Pathfinder for its strong performance in a time trial in 1912 covering the breadth of the isle of Great Britain, proving the cars were as durable as they were beautiful. Other long-distance outings of note included one man and his chauffeur covering 10,000 miles in the United States with no breakdowns, as well as a Pathfinder 12 driven by Walter Weidely (son of George Weidely, the designer of the engine under the hood) cross-country for a total of 4921 miles. Engines in Pathfinders started with four-cylinder engines, proceeded to six-cylinders, before culminating in Weideley 12-cylinder engines in 1916. The V-12 engined cars were called "Pathfinder the Great, King of the Twelves."

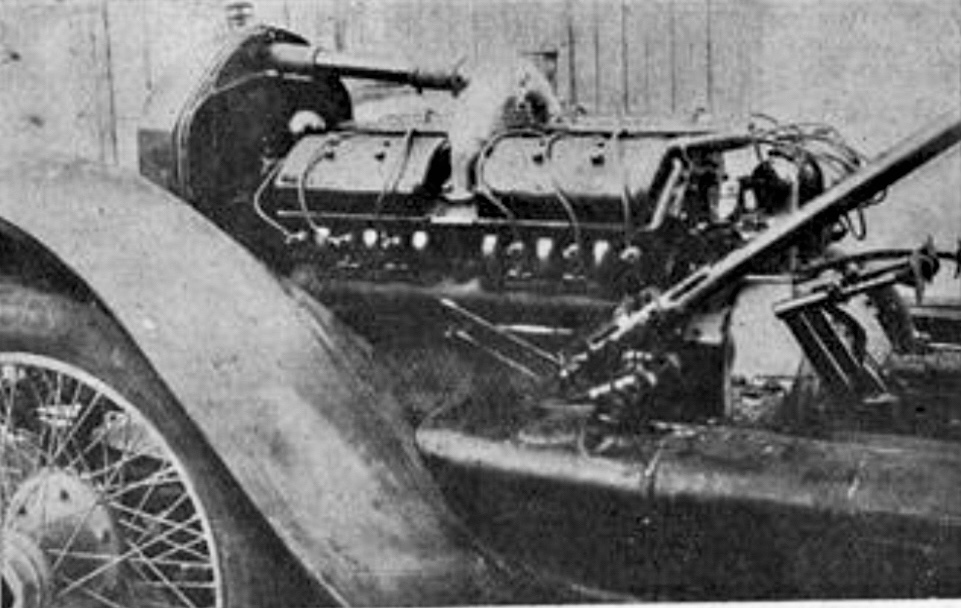
Pathfinder the Great, King of the Twelves; twelve-cylinder engine with a displacement of 6278 cc, a bore of 73 mm, and a stroke of 125 mm.

The main market for Pathfinder was producing cars for export to pre-war Russia. The beginning of World War I closed this market and Pathfinder was forced to refocus on the highly competitive US market.

Wartime shortages of materials financially hindered the Pathfinder Company. At the beginning of 1917, it was rumored that Pathfinder would merge with Empire. Instead, the company was gone by years end, and a new company moved into the factory to make shoe polish.

The San Diego Automotive Museum has a 1912 Pathfinder Model E in their collection. All other surviving examples are in private collections.
