= Rubyhorse =

Irish rock band

- Origin: Bishopstown, Cork, Ireland
- Genres: Alternative rock
- Labels: Brash Music; Island Def Jam; Horse Trade
- Members: Joe Philpott; Dave Farrell; Decky Lucey; Owen Fegan; Gordon Ashe
- Website: https://rubyhorse.ie/

Rubyhorse are a rock band from Cork, Ireland. Their debut album, A Lifetime In One Day, was released in Ireland on 2 June 1995. The band relocated to Boston, Massachusetts in 1997, and following the release of three additional albums How Far Have You Come?, Rise, and Goodbye To All That, they disbanded in 2005. In 2018, they partially regrouped and released 4 singles: A Little Rain, You Gotta Hold On, I Wanna Get Lost, and a remix of their 2003 hit Sparkle. During the pandemic of 2020 the original line-up regrouped for the first time since 2003 and recorded and released Punchdrunk featuring George Harrison from their homes in Ireland, The United States and The Netherlands.

== History ==
The band formed in Colaiste an Spioraid Naoimh secondary school Cork, Ireland, in 1988, taking their name from a Wonder Stuff song. Having toured Ireland to the point of saturation with their first release A Lifetime In One Day, they relocated to Boston, Massachusetts, in January 1997, and began what would become a 60-week residency performing at The Burren Irish Pub and Restaurant, in the Davis Square area of Somerville, Massachusetts. They won 3 Boston Music Awards within one year of arriving in America.

National tours ensued, as did a battle among various record labels to sign them. Fueled by the group reaching number one on the fledgling MP3 charts (a first for an unsigned group at this point), Rubyhorse signed an ill-fated deal with Interscope Records which saw them relocate to Los Angeles, and record an album with producer Paul Fox, which despite its enormous budget, was never released.

Major-label big-budget lesson learned, the band eventually returned to their roots, finding Ohio-born, Nashville-based producer Jay Joyce, and created the independently released album, How Far Have You Come, on a 16 track machine in his suburban Nashville basement.

Having toured the new album across the country, Island Records signed the band to their second deal under the same Universal Records umbrella they had just left in order to rework the How Far Have You Come album.

In the summer of 2001, the band returned to Nashville with Jay Joyce, recorded some new material (including "Sparkle"), took the tapes to Miami beach for Tom Lord Alge to mix, and finally released Rise, their only major-label album, which features slide guitar by George Harrison on the track "Punchdrunk".

The band toured the country, appeared on the Late Show with David Letterman, Late Night with Conan O'Brien, and Good Morning America, showcasing their single "Sparkle" which eventually hit No. 17 in the 2002 Billboard charts, won an Irish Meteor award, and can still be heard in movies such as Ed Burns' Sidewalks of New York, and TV shows such as Smallville. The song "Fell on Bad Days" was used in the final scene of the season finale of Season 1 of Rescue Me.

Following the departure of songwriter and original member Owen Fegan in August 2003, the band returned to Jay Joyce's Nashville compound to record Goodbye To All That, a critically acclaimed album which was released on the Atlanta-based Brash Label. The band toured extensively through the United States and Ireland, and although critically acclaimed, the album never gained the traction it needed to sustain the band who eventually broke up in 2005.

Subsequently, the members pursued solo projects. Joe Philpott formed "Jodavino" and the White Horse Guitar Club who achieved success in Ireland and Germany. In 2025, Philpott published a memoir, All Roads Lead To Where You Are (from Bishopstown to The Beatles).

Declan formed a side project with drummer Gordon Ashe called Leftbank and released two albums Why Can't Man Be More Like Animals and The Sky On My Birthday.

Owen Fegan released the "Maps Of Mars" EP under the name "VEMO" to positive reviews.

The original band line-up reconvened during the Covid 19 lockdown and recorded a "live from home" version of Punchdrunk featuring George Harrison. The YouTube video was released on July 2, 2020, and an extended single version was released on October 16, 2020. The delay in the official release was due to permission being required from the Harrison estate to have George's name associated with a new release of the song. Oliva and Dahni Harrison gave it their blessing.

== Band members ==
- Joe Philpott; guitars.
- Decky Lucey; bass.
- Owen Fegan; keyboards.
- Gordon Ashe; drums.
- Dave Farrell; lead vocals.

== Discography ==
Date	Title	Label	Type	Country
6 June 1995	A Lifetime in One Day	Horse Trade	LP	Ireland
7 July 1998	Mini Hummer E.P.	Horse Trade	EP	US
14 November 2000	How Far Have You Come?	Horse Trade	LP	US
21 May 2002	Rise	Island Def Jam	LP	US
6 August 2002	"Sparkle"	Island Def Jam	Single	US
3 September 2002	Any Day Now	Island Def Jam	EP	US
22 June 2004	Goodbye To All That	Brash Music	LP	US
7 August 2018	"I Wanna Get Lost"	self-released	Single	World
16 October 2020	"Punchdrunk (feat. George Harrison)"	self-released	Single	World
