= The Scarlet Empire =

1906 dystopian political satire novel by David M. Parry

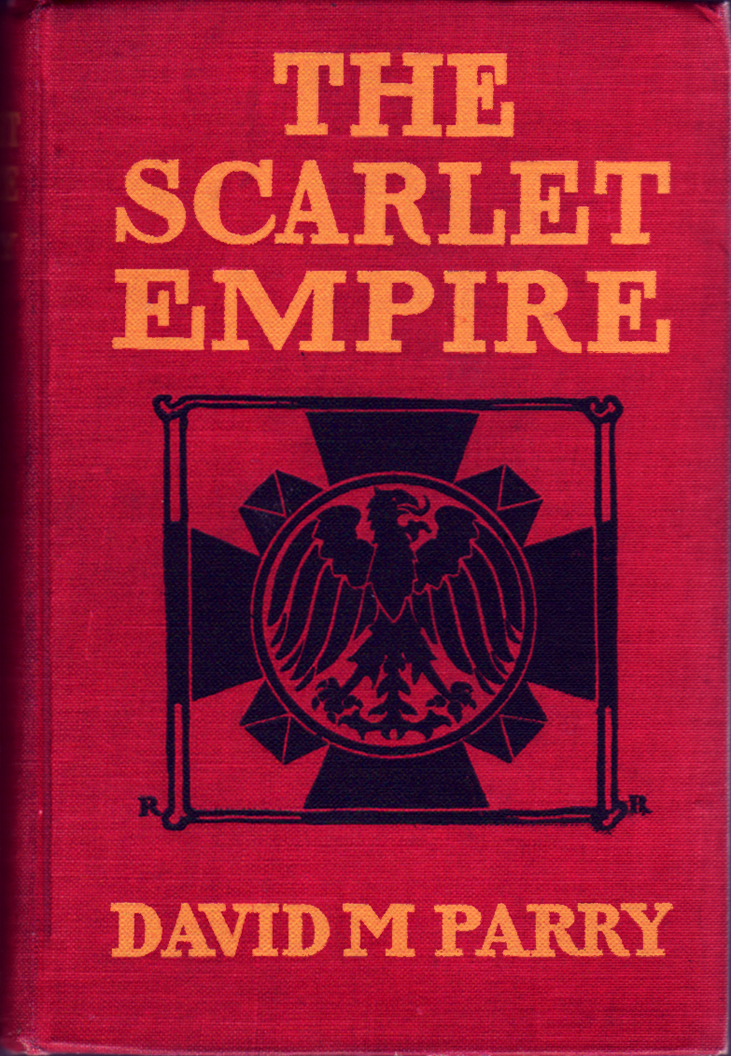
- first edition cover, 1906
- Author: David MacLean Parry
- Illustrator: Hermann C. Wall
- Language: English
- Genre: Dystopian fiction Speculative fiction Satire novel
- Publisher: Bobbs-Merrill
- Publication date: 1906
- Publication place: United States
- Media type: Print (hardcover)

The Scarlet Empire is a dystopian novel written by David MacLean Parry, a political satire first published in 1906. The book was one item in the major wave of utopian and dystopian literature that characterized the late nineteenth and early twentieth centuries.

== Plot summary ==
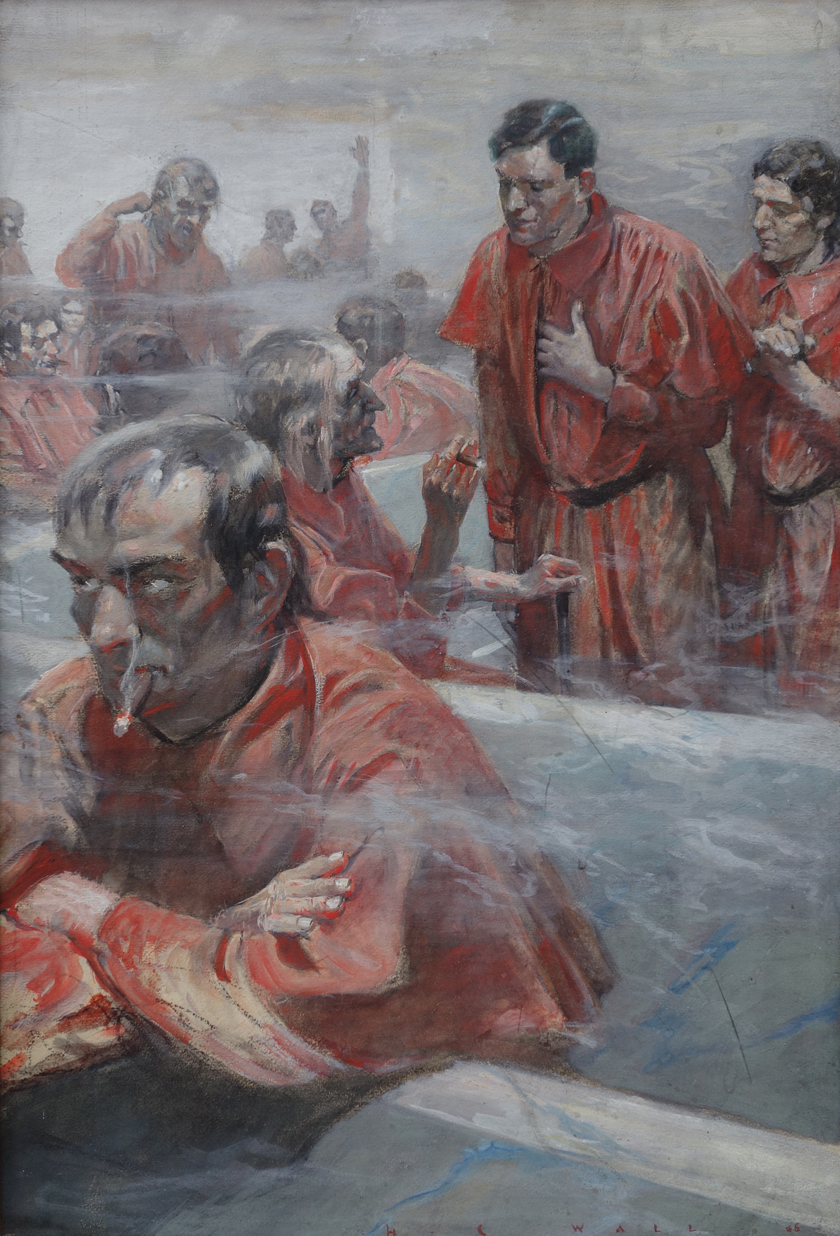
"With a smirk and a bow I greeted the old witch," original oil painting illustration for The Scarlet Empire by Hermann C. Wall (1875-1919), chapter 14, p. 140

John Walker is a young American socialist, active and dedicated. Yet his personal poverty, and the slow progress of his cause, leave him despondent. In a fit of depression he decides on suicide by drowning: he hurls himself off "the long pier...called the Suicides' Promenade" at Coney Island. He loses consciousness—but is revived by a man in a strange diving suit; Walker at first mistakes him for a kind of fish/man. In fact, the man is a surgeon engaged in research; he explains to Walker that they are in Atlantis, at the bottom of the sea, and gives the American a cursory explanation of the nature of Atlantean society. (He cannot say much; Atlanteans are limited to a thousand words of speech per day, as measured by the "verbometers" they wear.)

Socialist literature found in Walker's pockets suggests to the Atlantean authorities that Walker might be acceptable to their regime. (A few other Americans have penetrated to Atlantis in the past, though no one from the Earth's surface is there when Walker arrives.) The American is assigned to a barracks; the doctor who serves it is appointed his guide in all things Atlantean (and is given a dispensation to speak more than 1000 words per day). Together, the surgeon and the doctor become Walker's closest companions in his new life. The people of the domed city dress in red; their buildings, and even the cigars they smoke, are of the same color, giving their society its nickname, the Scarlet Empire.

At first, Walker (or Citizen No. 489 ADG, as he is designated) is delighted to have awakened in a socialist state; but his enthusiasm quickly fades as he experiences the capricious irrationality and the privations of life in a dictatorship of the proletariat. He soon learns that his guide, the doctor, shares his repulsion from Atlantean life. Walker meets, and quickly falls in love with, a beautiful young woman, No. 7891 OCD; since she has no name, he comes to call her Astraea—"the last goddess of heaven to visit the earth". Yet he is shocked to learn that his new love is condemned as an "atavar" (from "atavism"), a reactionary individualist, a dissenter who cannot or will not conform to the dictates of society. As such, she is confined to an insane asylum (another anticipation of Soviet times). Atavars are given chances to conform; the recalcitrant ones are fed to a kraken outside the dome of Atlantis, in a ceremony reminiscent of the Christians martyred in the Colosseum of ancient Rome. The plot quickly resolves into Walker's struggle to rescue Astraea and escape back to the surface.

The Atlanteans keep all they recover from the surface world in their Hall of Curiosities; its contents include everything from ships' figureheads and waterlogged books to enormous heaps of jewels and gold coins. In his research work, the surgeon comes into possession of a sunken miniature submarine; Walker and the doctor decide to use the vessel to escape. Their plan reaches a crisis when Walker is caught consorting with the imprisoned Astraea; the two are sentenced to be devoured by the kraken. Yet the hero and his friends manage a suspenseful getaway from the Atlanteans. Walker, Astraea, the doctor and the surgeon depart in their (treasure-laden) submarine; in a confrontation with the attacking kraken, they fire a torpedo, which kills the monster and also punctures the dome of Atlantis, destroying the city.

Walker and friends reach dry land. With the advantage of enormous wealth (the appropriated Atlantean treasure), they manage to make their way through the individualistic capitalist world. The surgeon and doctor distinguish themselves in science and medicine; Astraea and Walker enjoy a long happy marriage. After her eventual death, Walker writes the story of their adventure.

== Major themes ==
=== Genre ===
Utopian novels of Parry's era regularly advocated socialist solutions to the world's problems; Edward Bellamy's Looking Backward (1888) was the most famous book of this type, though there were many more. Other authors, however, reacted against this literature of socialist advocacy; writers of more conservative and capitalist orientations wrote to counter the leftist tendency of utopians like Bellamy, and produced dystopias and works of satire. Parry cast his Scarlet Empire precisely in this satiric dystopian vein; he exploited the ancient story of Atlantis to portray his conception of the defects of a socialist state, which he termed "Social Democracy."

=== The author and his politics ===
David Parry (1852–1915) was a businessman by profession, who served for a time as president of the National Association of Manufacturers. His political, economic, and social orientation was capitalist, hostile to socialism and to the developing labor movement of his generation. His pre-existing ideological commitment is clearly revealed in The Scarlet Empire; few would accuse Parry of objectivity. His assertion that the "first principle" of socialism is that "might is right" would be disputed not only by leftists but by many in the center of the political spectrum. Parry characterizes the capitalist system he favors this way: "Though some may obtain more material comfort than others, yet none starves, and the strong learn to be charitable to the weak". This description that would not pass universally unchallenged. In his own time, Parry was sarcastically dubbed one of the "latest valiant conquerors of the Socialist Dragon."

In the book, Parry envisions the Atlanteans as reverting to the habit of some of the early democracies of ancient Greece, in which some public offices were assigned to citizens by lot. In Atlantis, in fact, all occupations are assigned by lot; one becomes a farmer, or an Inspector, or fills any other job or profession, purely by chance.

Parry's American protagonist is astounded to find himself assigned to the Atlantean legislature, the Vorunk, apparently by this method of chance. It is a dreary job that nobody wants, and he amuses himself there by creating even more absurd laws. (He gets snoring declared a crime, punishable by death.) He quickly learns that the people who run Atlantis are corrupt and self-interested, and violate the basic tenets of Atlantean equality to feed their own hunger for power.

=== Atlantis ===
In the aftermath of Ignatius Donnelly's enormously popular Atlantis: The Antediluvian World (1882), a number of novelists chose Atlantis as the setting for their fictions. Parry's book shows the influence of Donnelly: he pictures the ancient Phoenicians, the Aztecs, and the Incas as offshoots of Atlantean civilization.

These Atlantis novels were often adventure tales and romances that were set in the ancient world, like C. J. Cutcliffe Hyne's The Lost Continent (1899); yet others, like Arthur Conan Doyle's The Maracot Deep (1929), take place in the modern world and involve the survival of Atlantis through the intervening millennia. Parry took the latter approach; his Atlantis has persisted as a submarine city for thousands of years. Over recent centuries, it has rejected its ancient and traditional monarchy for "Social Democracy."

Parry's primary goal, however, is not in crafting a tightly organized fiction, in the way a science-fiction writer might do; he does not even attempt to provide a plausible explanation for the survival of Atlantis. Neither does he try to explain how his modern American protagonist can speak and read the same language as the Atlanteans. Parry's focus is on the polemical and satirical goals of his book.

=== Satire ===
Parry exploits the Atlantean legend to condemn the advocacy of socialism that was prominent in his own era. Parry wrote when the American Federation of Labor was meeting increasing success in organizing American workers; the AFL used what it called "walking delegates" to inspect union activities and enforce its contracts with manufacturers. In his novel, Parry imagines a "Federation of Labor of Atlantis" that becomes so powerful that it dominates the democratic government of Atlantis, and then imposes its extreme commitment to workers' "equality" on the whole society. In his view, this type of state would repress all individual rights and enforce a destructive and inhumane conformity on its citizen victims.

For Parry, the resulting society resembles an enormous prison. Parry wrote prior to the Bolshevik Revolution of 1917; he took Czarist Russia as his model and precedent for what his socialist prison-state would be like. Nonetheless, Parry made some surprisingly prescient forecasts of the excesses of Marxist/Leninist Communism to come. His Atlanteans dress in dreary unisex outfits, like the Mao suit used by the Chinese during the Maoist era. He pictures Atlantean agriculture as primitive and inefficient, like Russian agriculture in the Soviet era. The Atlantean state goes to extremes to ensure that everyone gets the same amount of food to eat—while neglecting the obvious strategy of trying to produce more food. (The result is that the average, undernourished Atlantean male is five feet tall and weighs 110 pounds.)

Parry's Atlantis does not rely upon secret police, like Czarist Russia and later totalitarian societies; spies and enforcers work openly, as "Inspectors" (successors of AFL-style "walking delegates"). In his Atlantis, fully one quarter of the workers are Inspectors. There are Departments of Sleep Inspectors, Time Inspectors, Bath Inspectors, Cooking Inspectors, and many more. Parry addresses the enduring problem of who guards the guardians?, with a Department of Inspectors of Inspectors—and a Department of Inspectors of Inspectors of Inspectors.

In Parry's Atlantis, personal names have been replaced with alphanumeric designations. The state classifies its citizens with a system that starts with the cephalic index. Yet the division of humans into the two classes of brachycephaly and dolichocephaly causes dissatisfaction, since it negates the prime value of equality. The Atlantean regime works to overcome this basic distinction: "in order to produce greater uniformity in the length of the head, the plan has been tried of using pressure on the heads of children, but the results have been sadly disappointing." Instead, the state produces greater physical equality through eugenics. Matchmaking is determined by government function, without personal choice: tall people are matched with short, attractive with homely, etc., to produce a more uniform and standard Atlantean.

Much of Parry's satire concentrates on the Atlantean state's excesses in its attempts to enforce equality. The Atlantean legislature eventually passes bills "Requiring the Use of the Left Arm as Much as the Right", and "Providing for the Equal Use of the Maxillary Muscles on Both Sides of the Mouth in Masticating Food".

== Reception and influence ==
The early responses to Parry's Scarlet Empire were conditioned by its politics: conservative or mainstream reviewers liked or accepted it, while progressive reception was far more critical. In one example, The Craftsman, the periodical of Gustav Stickley's American Craftsman movement, called the novel "grotesque" and "a crude romance."

Though Parry was not a professional writer, his book is surprisingly well-done for an amateur. (In this respect, contrast Bradford Peck's contemporaneous The World a Department Store.) Parry imagines that Atlantis is heated and lit by the power of radium, and evocatively describes its "scintillating" light. He is good on the gloomy grandeur of the Atlantean realm, as when Walker first beholds the full scale of the city:

It was as though we had stepped into some vast cathedral...I looked down a vista of titanic columns, which rose to a dome of immeasurable height. About each pillar ran a line of light – a shining vine – winding upward until its brilliancy contracted to a thread and lost itself in the upper air. The dome was faintly disclosed by lights which shed their rays like distant stars...and in this half-light the columns shimmered like colored marble and were dimly mirrored in the smooth and glossy flooring of the mighty naves. At intervals, running transversely across the vista down which I looked, were channels from which shone forth floods of light, and these channels I came afterward to know to be the streets of Atlantis. In the day-dreams of my boyhood I had often pictured sea caverns with crystal walls and sweeping distances, but no stretch of my imagination was ever comparable to the reality that now confronted me.

Indeed, John Clute and John Grant, in their Encyclopedia of Fantasy, suggest that the novel was perhaps ghost-written. The Scarlet Empire had a longer life than many popular novels enjoy, however. This was due partly to its humor and its effective storytelling—and due partly to effective promotion by capitalist interests. (The novel was serialized in American Industries, the magazine of the National Association of Manufacturers.) The book went through multiple editions; as late as 1954, L. Sprague de Camp would refer to it as a "well-known" work.

A new edition of Parry's book was released in 2001 by Southern Illinois University Press.

== See also ==
- List of underwater science fiction works
