= Freberg (disambiguation) =

Freberg is a village in Norway.

Freberg may also refer to:

- Donavan Freberg (born 1971), American photographer
- Stan Freberg (1926–2015), American comedian

== See also ==
- Freborg, another surname/nameplace
