= Fegen (locality) =

Locality in Halland County, Sweden

Coordinates: 57°06′N 13°02′E

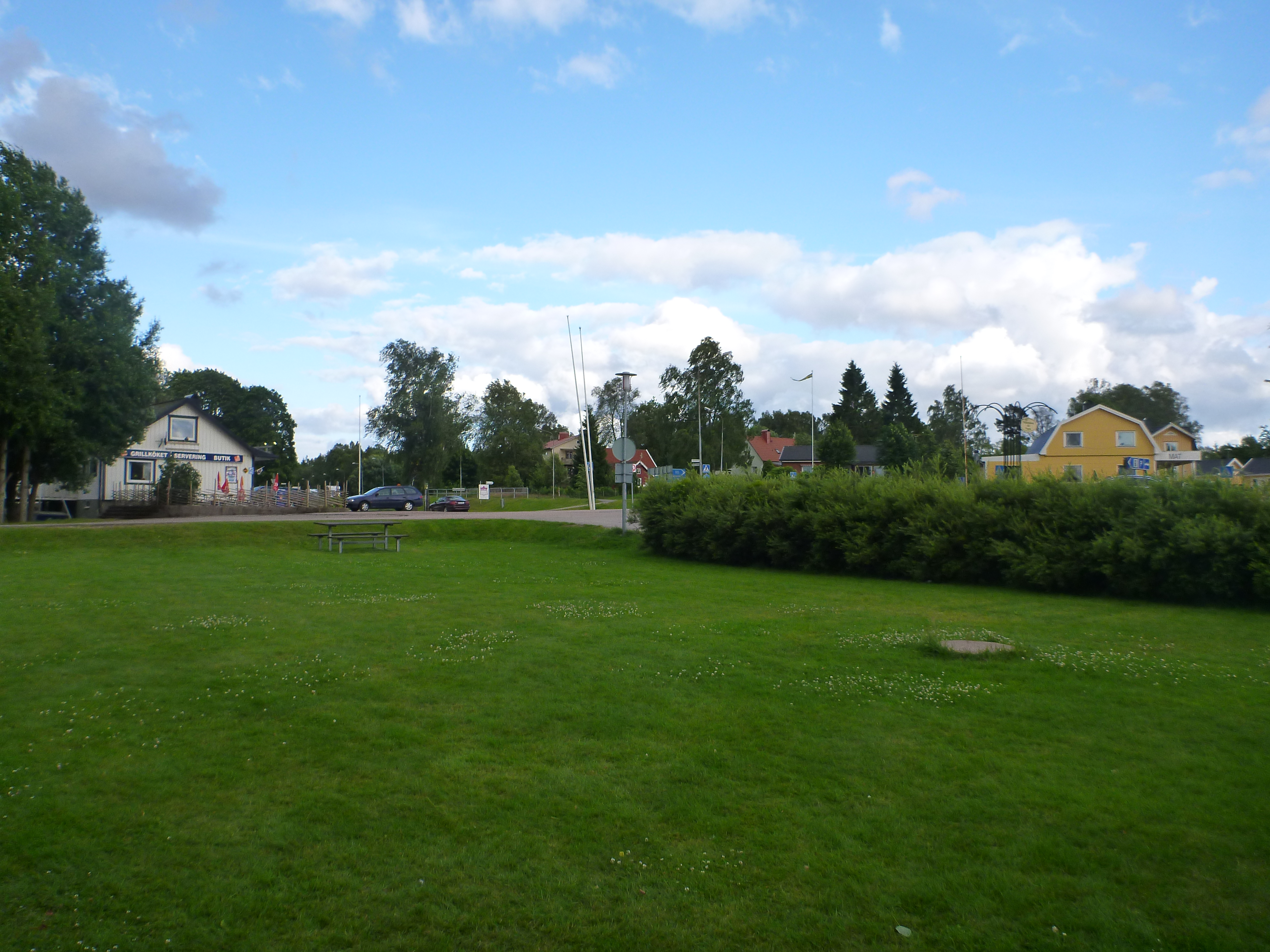
View from the picnic area to Fegen centre

Fegen (Swedish pronunciation: [ˈfêːɡɛn]) is a locality situated in Falkenberg Municipality, Halland County, Sweden, with 235 inhabitants in 2015. The village is located at the south shore of lake Fegen, close to the nature reserve Fegen. The country road 153, from Varberg to Värnamo, goes through the village.

The area around the village is dominated by forests, partly marshy and lakes.

== History ==
Between 1887 and 1961 a railroad connection between Fegen and Ätran and between Fegen and Kinnared existed. This good infra-structure resulted in the development of up to four saw mills in the village.

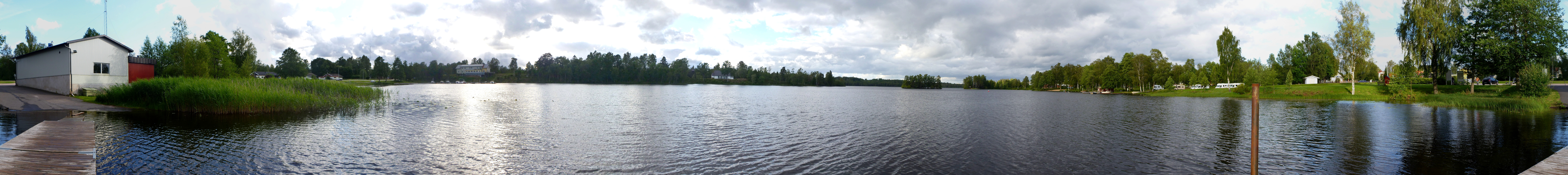
Panoramic view from pier in the Fegen lake. From left to right: Firefighter house, Fegen Inspiration Area at the main road 153, Hostel (yellow), church, lake, picnic area with information signs.
