= Landeryd =

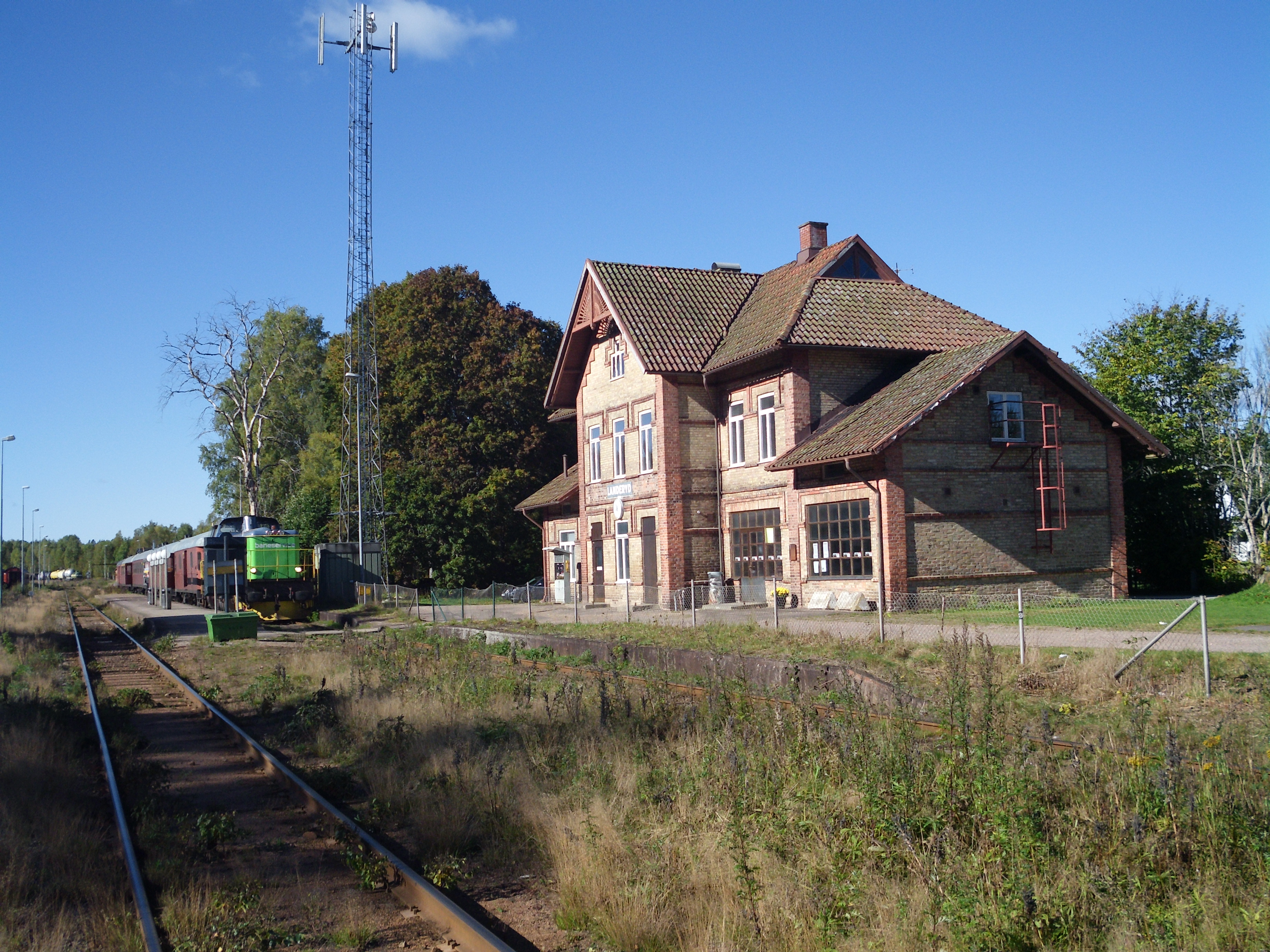
- Train station in Landeryd (2013)

- Location within Halland Location within Sweden
- Coordinates: 57°05′N 13°16′E
- Country: Sweden
- Province: Småland
- County: Halland County
- Municipality: Hylte Municipality

Area
  - Total: 0.80 km^{2} (0.31 sq mi)

Population (31 December 2010)
  - Total: 367
  - Density: 460/km^{2} (1,200/sq mi)
- Time zone: UTC+1 (CET)
  - Summer (DST): UTC+2 (CEST)

Landeryd is a locality situated in Hylte Municipality, Halland County, Sweden with 367 inhabitants in 2010.
