= Owen Fegan =

- Born: 1 November 1972 (age 53); Cork, Ireland
- Genres: Indie rock, Alternative rock
- Occupations: musician; creative director; photographer; producer; artist
- Instruments: Vocals; guitar; piano; bass; keyboards
- Years active: 1988–present
- Labels: Interscope Records, Island Records

Owen Fegan (born 1 November 1972) is an Irish musician, creative director, and photographer. He is best known as the keyboard player and songwriter with the alternative rock band Rubyhorse, and as former Design Director for Rolling Stone, and Chief Creative Officer of Yext.

Fegan was born in Cork, Ireland, and formed Rubyhorse in 1988 with schoolmates Dave Farrell, Decky Lucey, Joe Philpott, and Gordon Ashe. After the band’s relocation to Boston in 1997, three studio albums (A Lifetime In One Day, How Far Have You Come, and Rise), two major-label recording contracts (Interscope Records and Island Records), a single Sparkle which peaked at #21 on the Billboard charts in the summer of 2002, a collaboration with George Harrison on the track Punchdrunk, TV appearances including Late Show with David Letterman and Late Night with Conan O'Brien, and international tours with artists including R.E.M., INXS, Culture Club, and Def Leppard, Fegan played his last show with Rubyhorse at the World Peace Music Awards in Bali, Indonesia in June 2003 and moved to New York City.

His photography has appeared in several commercial campaigns, as well as magazines such as SPIN, Rolling Stone, and Blender, as well as Tom Petty’s Runnin' Down A Dream alongside Mark Seliger, Annie Leibovitz, and Danny Clinch (who coincidentally shot the Rise cover for Rubyhorse).

Soon after his move to New York City, Fegan joined Spin as creative director, and has held the title at Rolling Stone, New York, and streaming music service Grooveshark. He also served as chief creative officer at New-York based tech company Yext which filed its "IPO", on 13 April 2017.

In 2019, Fegan relocated to Amsterdam.

== Discography ==
Date	Title	Artist	Label	Type	Country
6 June 1995	A Lifetime In One Day	Rubyhorse	Horse Trade	LP	Ireland
7 July 1998	Mini Hummer E.P.	Rubyhorse	Horse Trade	EP	US
14 November 2000	How Far Have You Come?	Rubyhorse	Horse Trade	LP	US
21 May 2002	Rise	Rubyhorse	Island Def Jam	LP	US
6 August 2002	Sparkle	Rubyhorse	Island Def Jam	Single	US
3 September 2002	Any Day Now	Rubyhorse	Island Def Jam	Single	US
22 June 2004	Goodbye To All That	Rubyhorse	Brash Music	LP	US
27 June 2006	Oxygen	Sam Bisbee	Terrible Records	LP	US
17 November 2017	Maps of Mars	VEMO	The Binery	EP	US
16 October 2020	Punchdrunk (feat. George Harrison)	Rubyhorse	Rive Gauche Records	Single	World
