= Fegen (lake) =

Lake in Sweden

Coordinates: 57°11′N 13°9′E

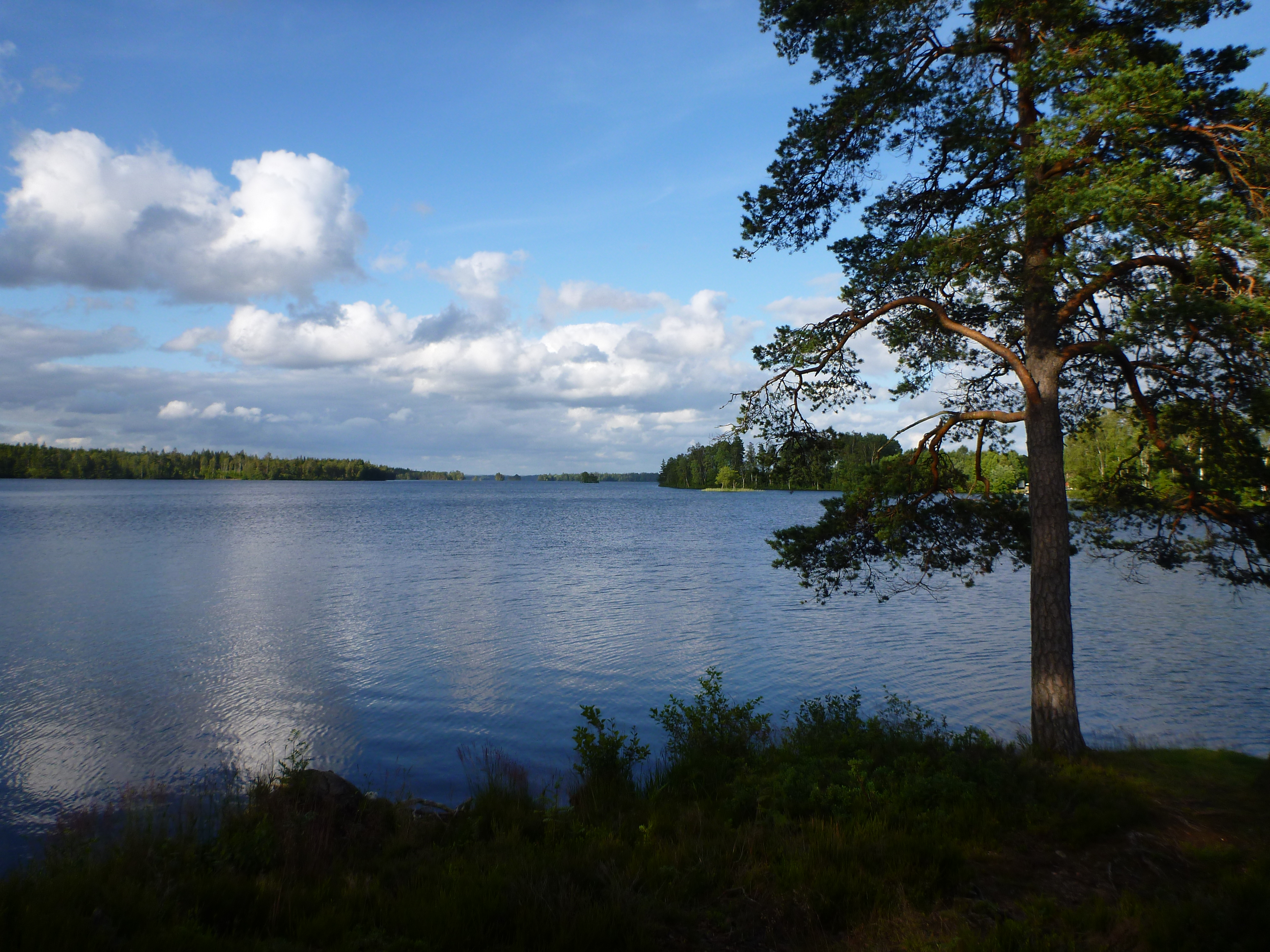
Lake Fegen close to the village Fegen

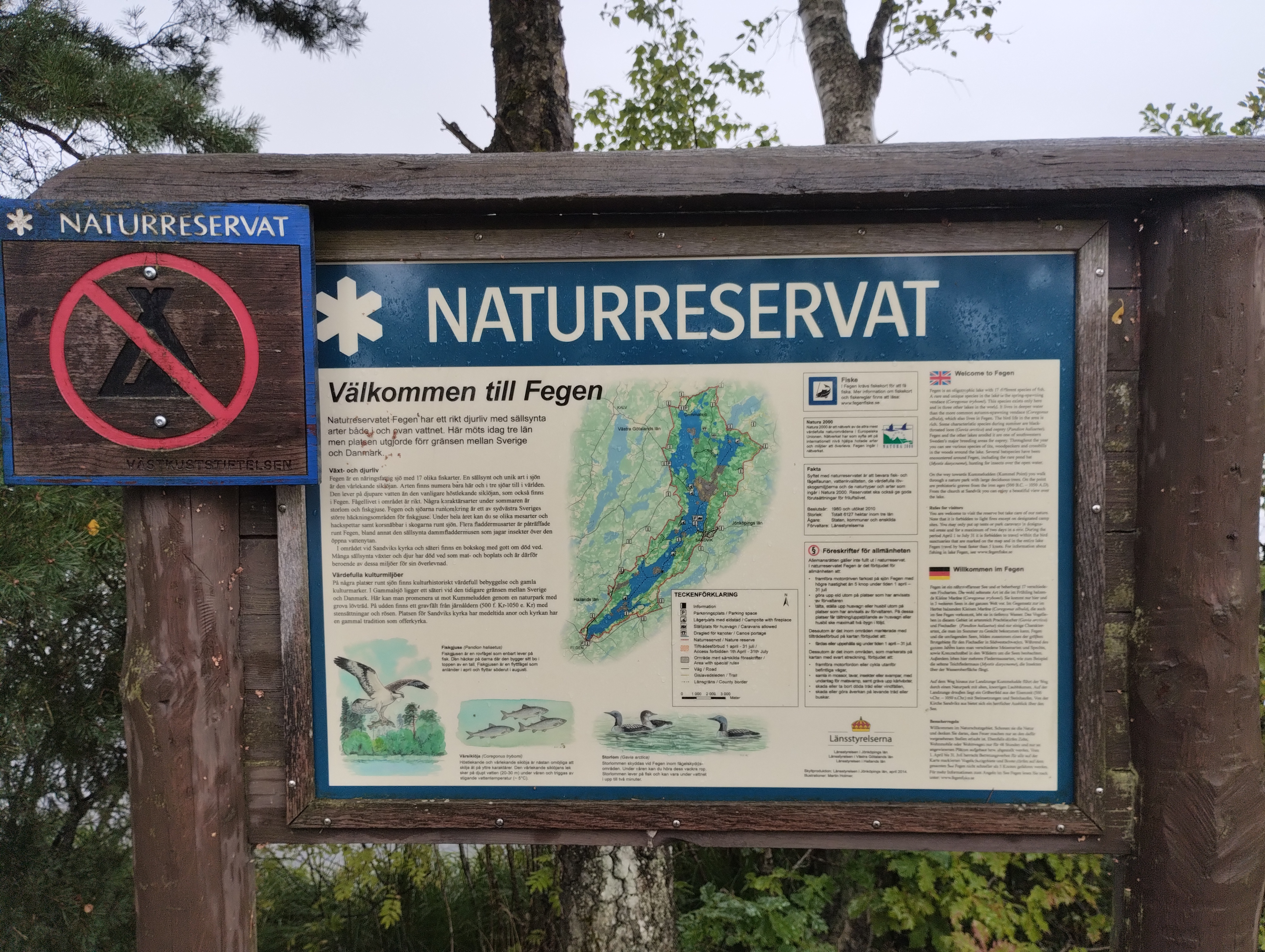
Information board at Fegen Nature Reserve

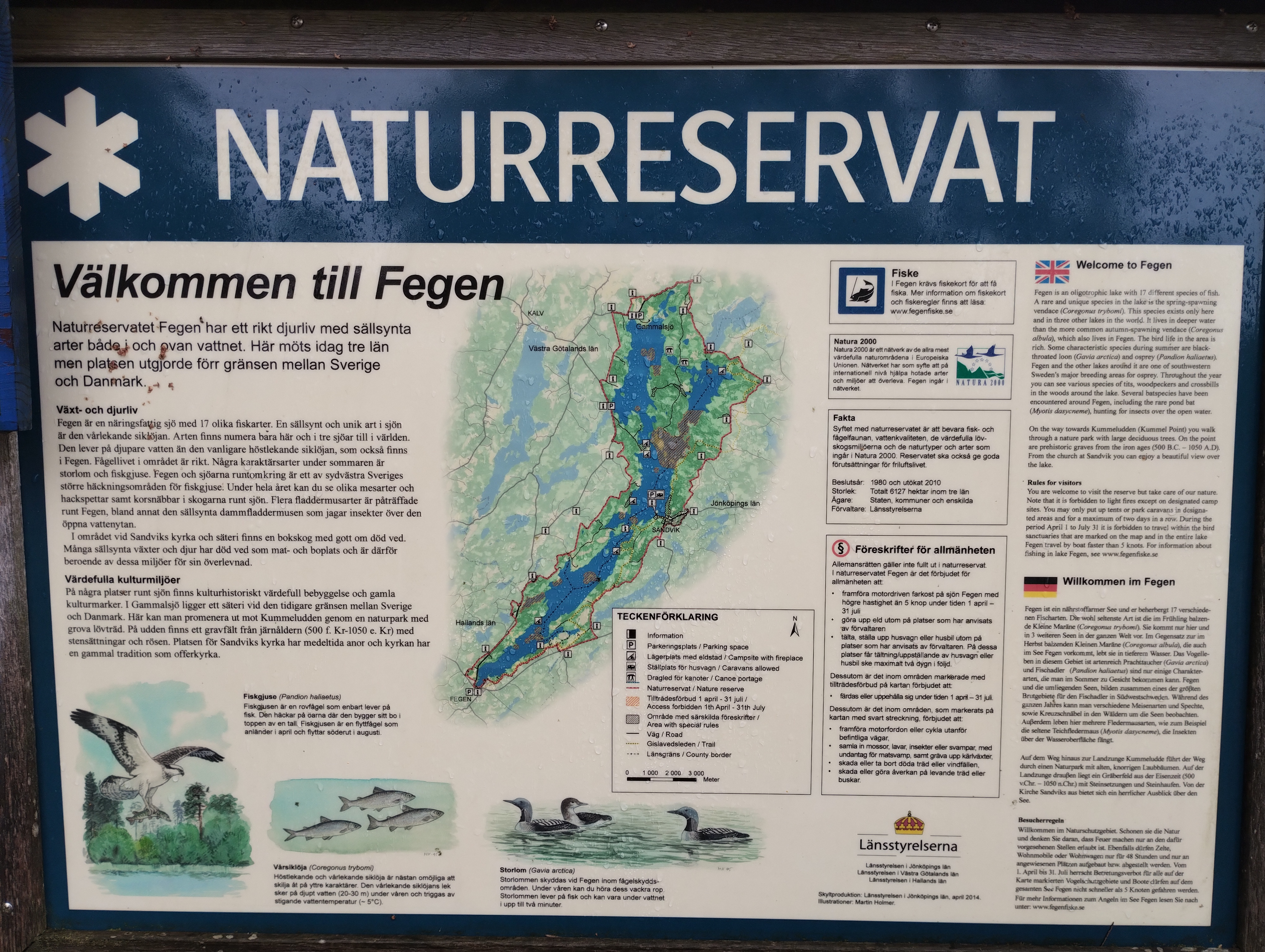
Information board at Fegen Nature Reserve

Fegen (Swedish pronunciation: [ˈfêːɡɛn]) is a lake and nature reserve in Sweden. It is a dedicated Natura 2000 area and one of the most protection worthy lakes in Sweden, according to Länsstyrelsen.

The lake has a surface area of 24 square kilometres (9.3 sq mi) and a maximum depth of 38 metres (125 ft). The lake is situated in the traditional provinces (landskap in Swedish) Halland, Småland and Västergötland. Their boundaries meet approximately in the middle of the lake.

The village Fegen is located on the south side of the lake, the village Sandvik on the northeast side.

== Nature reserve ==
The nature reserve Fegen covers an area of 9.7 square kilometres (3.7 sq mi), partly lake, islands, and surrounding land. The nature protection area was established in 1980 and it became a nature reserve in 2010.
