= David M. Parry =

David MacLean Parry
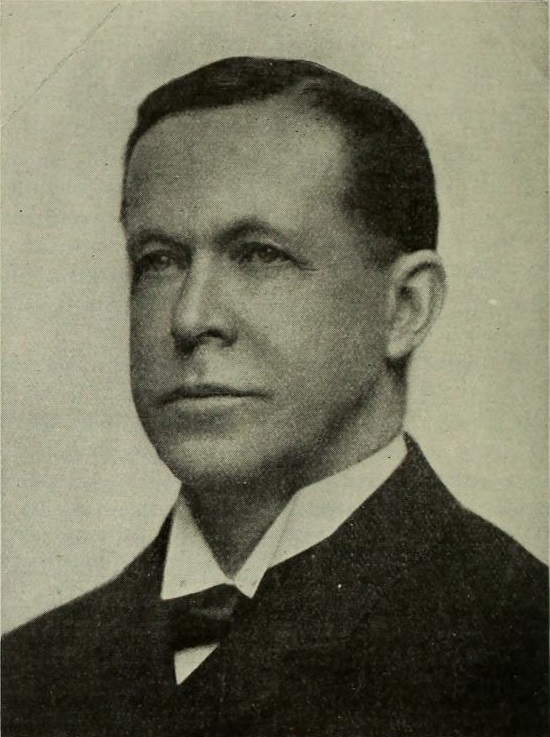
- Portrait of David MacLean Parry
- Born: February 28, 1830; Allegheny County, Pennsylvania
- Died: May 12, 1915; Indianapolis, Indiana
- Burial place: Crown Hill Cemetery and Arboretum, Section 14, Lot 6; 39.8199038°N 86.1759133°W
- Spouse: Hessie Daisy Maxwell
- Children: Lydia Maxwell Parry, Cora Parry Oakes, Lydia Maxwell Parry Teasdale, Maxwell Oswald Parry, David MacLean Parry Jr.

David MacLean Parry (26 March 1852—12 May 1915) was an American industrialist and writer.

== Biography ==
David MacLean Parry was born on a farm near Pittsburgh, Pennsylvania. He worked briefly as a clerk, a traveling salesman, a reporter on The New York Herald and later became a successful businessman. He was president of Parry Manufacturing Co., and Parry Oil and Pipe Line Co., the Parry Auto Co.

Parry served for a time as president of the American Educational Society, the Citizens' Industrial Association of America and the National Association of Manufacturers.

Parry was well known for being extremely hostile to labor unions and workers' rights. He authored the anti-socialistic dystopian novel The Scarlet Empire. The book was written as a satirical counterblast to Edward Bellamy's Looking Backward. He was a thirty-second degree Mason, a Shriner, and an Odd Fellow.

In 1903 Parry, as president of the National Association of Manufacturers, spoke at a Minneapolis Commercial Club reception. He stated the true nature of the United States business community's drive against union labor, "I believe we should endeavor to strike at the root of the matter, and that is to be found in the wide spread socialistic sentiment among certain classes of people." and declared "Law and order must be enforced and that class domination over industry is not going to be tolerated."

In his book A Union Against Unions: The Minneapolis Citizens Alliance and Its Fight Against Organized Labor, William Millikan writes "in a brief moment of candor, Parry revealed the simple fact that the Citizens Alliance would attempt to conceal from the public for three decades that the open shop movement was a war between the owners of American industry and the working class."

== Works ==
- "Speech to the Convention of the National Association of Manufacturers, New Orleans, April 14, 1903," Indianapolis Journal, April 15, 1903, pg. 4.
- "The Necessity of Organization Among Employers," Science, Vol. XVII, No. 440, June 5, 1903.
- "What can a University Contribute to Preparation for Business Life?" In: Convention of Educators and Business Men for the Discussion of Higher Commercial Education. Ann Arbor: The Richmond & Backus Co., 1903.
- "The Employer's Side," Saturday Evening Post, October 1904.
- The Scarlet Empire. New York: Grosset & Dunlap, 1906.
- "David M. Parry, Author of 'The Scarlet Empire,' Replies to Socialists Criticism," The New York Times, April 15, 1906.
- "Automobile Sales and the Panic," The Annals of the American Academy of Political and Social Science, Vol. XXXIV, July/December 1909.
- "Mine—Property and Rights." In: Walton Hale Hamilton (ed.), Current Economic Problems, The University of Chicago Press, 1914.

== See also ==
- Eugen Richter
- George F. Baer
- Henry Ward Beecher
- Morris Hillquit

== Publications ==
- Millikan, William (2001). A Union Against Unions: The Minneapolis Citizens Alliance and Its Fight Against Organized Labor. Minnesota Historical Society Press.
