= Torup, Halland =

Torup
- Location within Halland Location within Sweden
- Coordinates: 56°57′28.08″N 13°4′51.24″E
- Country: Sweden
- Province: Halland
- County: Halland County
- Municipality: Hylte Municipality

Area
  - Total: 1.63 km^{2} (0.63 sq mi)

Population (31 December 2010)
  - Total: 1,183
  - Density: 726/km^{2} (1,880/sq mi)
- Time zone: UTC+1 (CET)
  - Summer (DST): UTC+2 (CEST)

Torup (Swedish pronunciation: [ˈtǔːrɵp]) is a locality situated in Hylte Municipality, Halland County, Sweden with 1,183 inhabitants in 2010.

== Climate ==
Torup has a transitional oceanic climate with considerable moderate continental attributes. It is consistently the rainiest location in the country of the official 100 reference weather stations used by SMHI for its monthly reports. Considering its southerly latitude in the country, cold extremes are unusually common. Frost has been recorded even in the midst of summer. Temperature normals however do not differ much from other southern Sweden localities, with winter highs most often staying above freezing and summers being warm.

Climate data for Torup (temperatures 2002-2015; precipitation Jan 2002-May 2018)
Month	Jan	Feb	Mar	Apr	May	Jun	Jul	Aug	Sep	Oct	Nov	Dec	Year
Record high °C (°F)	9.9 (49.8)	15.7 (60.3)	19.9 (67.8)	28.6 (83.5)	29.2 (84.6)	33.1 (91.6)	34.0 (93.2)	35.5 (95.9)	28.3 (82.9)	22.1 (71.8)	14.6 (58.3)	11.2 (52.2)	35.5 (95.9)
Mean daily maximum °C (°F)	1.3 (34.3)	1.9 (35.4)	6.1 (43.0)	11.9 (53.4)	16.9 (62.4)	19.8 (67.6)	22.4 (72.3)	21.4 (70.5)	17.3 (63.1)	11.1 (52.0)	6.3 (43.3)	3.0 (37.4)	11.6 (52.9)
Daily mean °C (°F)	−1.2 (29.8)	−1.0 (30.2)	1.8 (35.2)	6.3 (43.3)	11.0 (51.8)	14.1 (57.4)	16.9 (62.4)	16.2 (61.2)	12.3 (54.1)	7.3 (45.1)	3.9 (39.0)	0.6 (33.1)	7.3 (45.1)
Mean daily minimum °C (°F)	−3.7 (25.3)	−3.9 (25.0)	−2.4 (27.7)	0.7 (33.3)	5.0 (41.0)	8.3 (46.9)	11.4 (52.5)	11.0 (51.8)	7.4 (45.3)	3.4 (38.1)	1.4 (34.5)	−1.7 (28.9)	3.0 (37.4)
Record low °C (°F)	−31.4 (−24.5)	−29.5 (−21.1)	−23.6 (−10.5)	−11.5 (11.3)	−7.5 (18.5)	−2.7 (27.1)	−0.7 (30.7)	−2.4 (27.7)	−5.8 (21.6)	−13.6 (7.5)	−18.3 (−0.9)	−28.9 (−20.0)	−31.4 (−24.5)
Average precipitation mm (inches)	116.0 (4.57)	75.4 (2.97)	60.1 (2.37)	54.3 (2.14)	70.2 (2.76)	104.4 (4.11)	111.8 (4.40)	146.7 (5.78)	99.4 (3.91)	120.4 (4.74)	110.0 (4.33)	125.9 (4.96)	1,194.6 (47.03)
Source 1: SMHI Average Precipitation 2002-2018
Source 2: SMHI Average Data 2002-2015
