= Denis Van Weynbergh =

Danish Offshore yachtsman

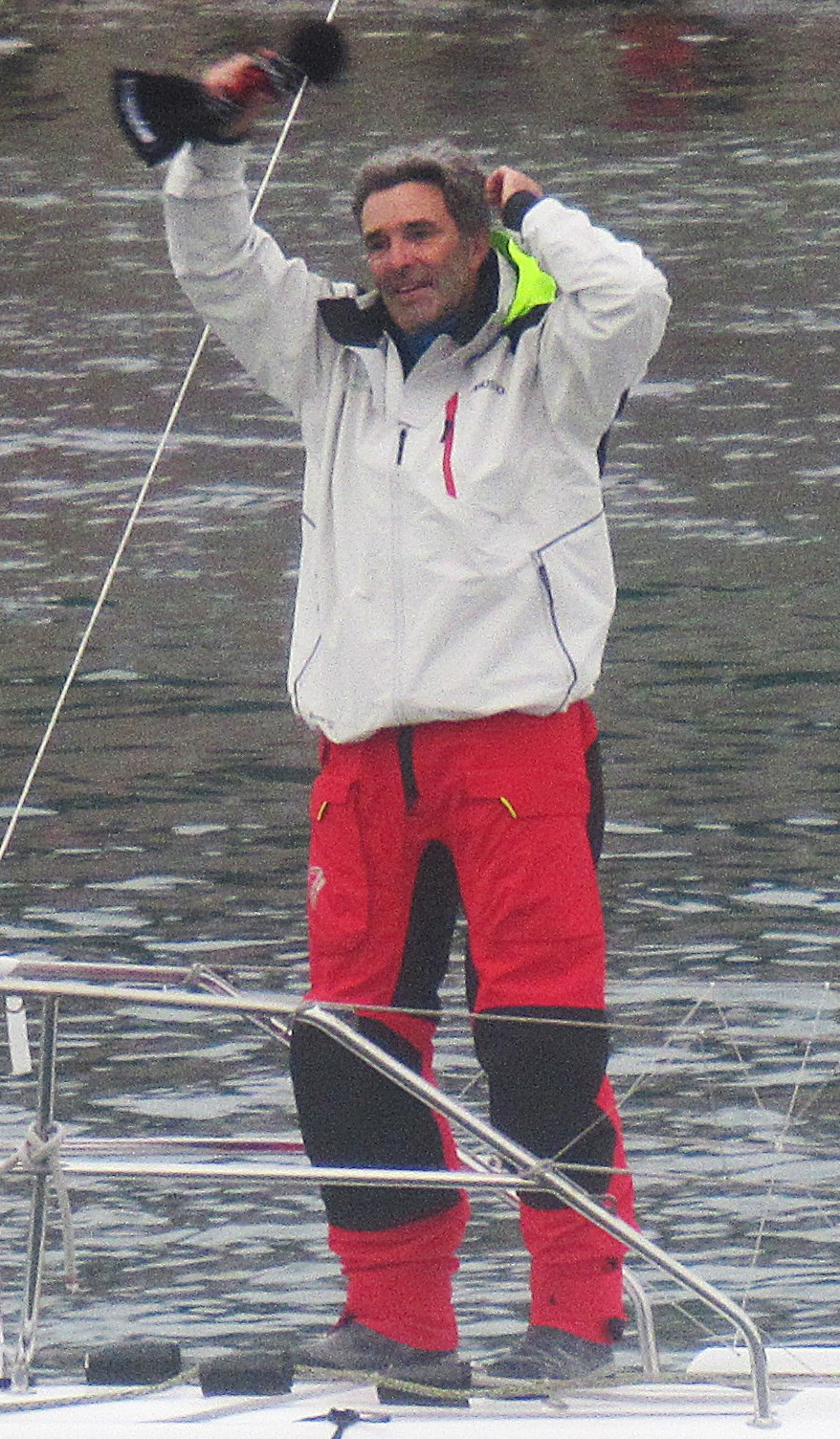
- At the start of the 2024-2025 Vendée Globe
- Born: 29 July 1967 (age 58); Ixelles, Belgium
- Occupation: Offshore sailor

Denis Van Weynbergh born 29 July 1967 is a Belgian professional offshore sailor.

== Racing results ==
Pos	Year	Race	Class	Boat name	Notes	Ref
Round the world races
TLE / 40	2024/25	2024-2025 Vendée Globe	IMOCA 60	D’Ieteren Group	Van Weynbergh was the first participant circumnavigating but sailing across the finish line after its closure.	
Transatlantic Races
27 / 28	2024	Transat New York Vendée	IMOCA 60	Singchain Team Haikou	15d 01h 13min 04s	
30 / 32	2023	Retour à la base (Transat B to B)	IMOCA 60	D’Ieteren Group	13d 14h 35m 53s	
34 / 40	2023	2023 Transat Jacques Vabre	IMOCA 60	D’Ieteren Group	17d 10h 39m 56s with Tanguy Le Turquais (FRA)	
16 / 26	2013	2013 Transat Jacques Vabre	Class 40	FRA 104 – Proximedia-Sauvez	24d 22h 24m 21s with Jean-Édouard Criquioche (FRA)	
19 / 20	2012	Transat Québec–Saint-Malo	Class 40	BEL 42 – Proximedia	14d 05h 37m 09s	
39 / 44	2010	2010 Route du Rhum	Class 40	BEL 40 – Green Energy	24d 20h 57m 33s	
19 / 27	2001	Mini Transat	Mini Transat 6.50	207 – Librairie Marine		
Other Races
27 / 29	2023	Fastnet Race	IMOCA 60	D’Ieteren Group	with Erwan Le Mené (FRA)	
17 / 23	2023	Fastnet Race	Class 40	Cap 58-be.brussels	with Jonas Gerckens (FRA)	

== Gallery ==
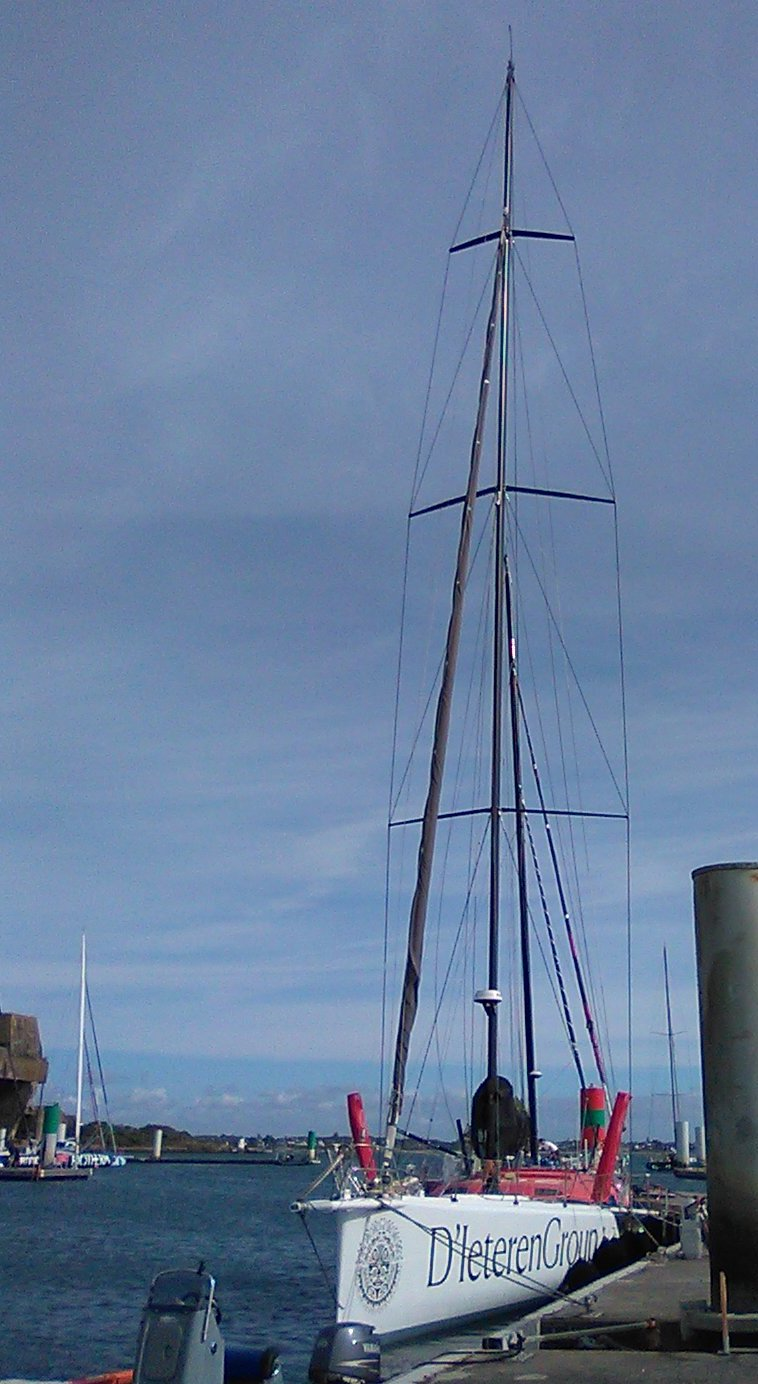
