= Yannick Bestaven =

French skipper

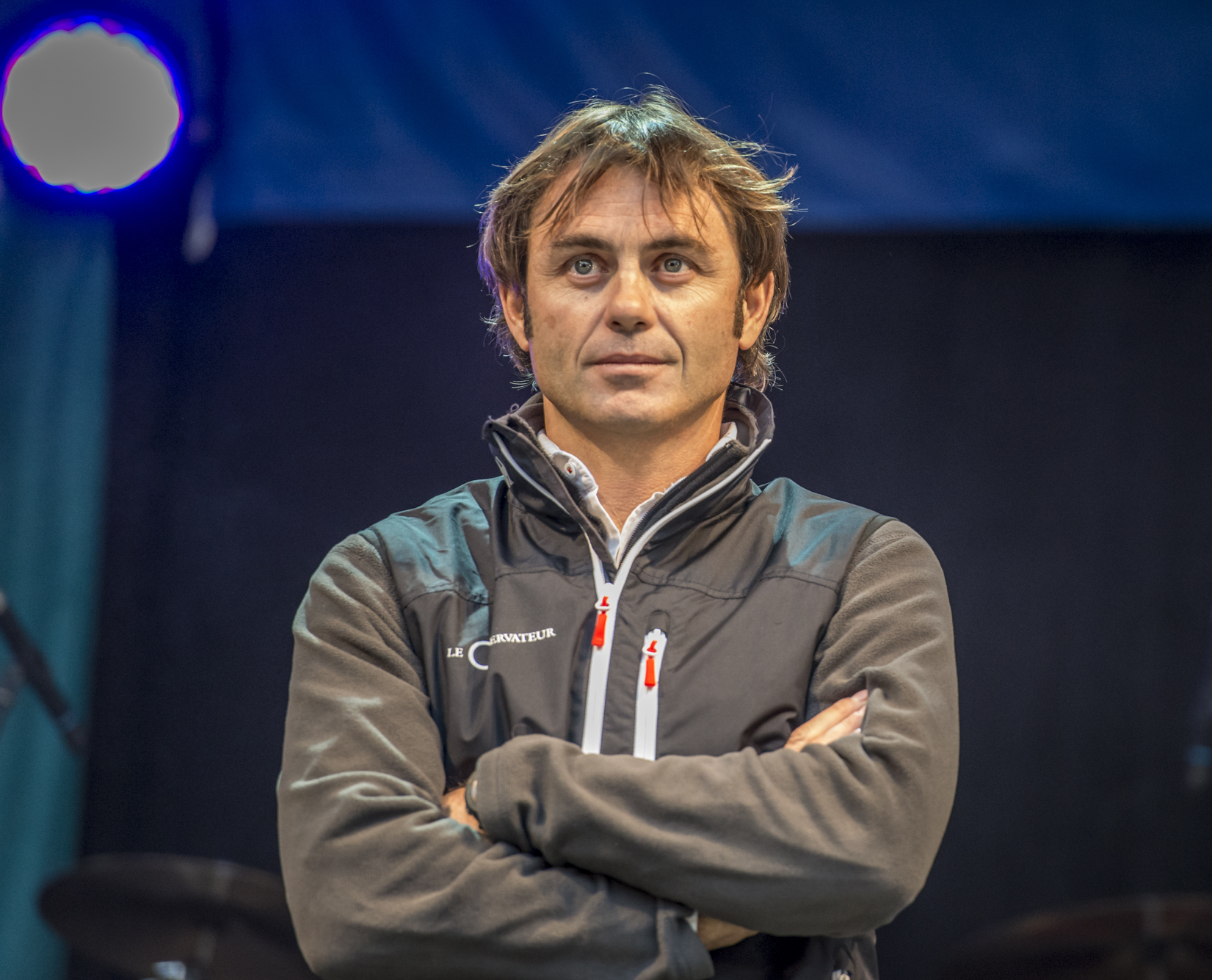
- Yannick Bestaven in the 2014 Route du Rhum

Personal information
- Nationality: France
- Born: 28 December 1972 (age 52) Saint-Nazaire, Loire-Atlantique, France

Sport

Sailing career
- Class(es): IMOCA 60, Class40

Yannick Bestaven (born 28 December 1972 in Saint-Nazaire in the Loire-Atlantique region) is a French offshore sailor. He won the Transat 6.50 in 2001, was twice winner of the Transat Jacques-Vabre, and won the Vendée Globe in 2020-21.

== Biography ==
In January 2021, he won the 2020–2021 Vendée Globe for IMOCA 60 class yachts on board Maître CoQ IV, formerly known as Safran 3. He won despite crossing the line in third position, thanks to a time bonus received for participating in the rescue of fellow sailor Kevin Escoffier, whose yacht had sunk, earlier in the race. An engineer by training, he is the co-designer of the Watt and Sea hydrogenator designed by Eric Tabarly.

== Key race results ==
| Year | Pos. | Race | Class | Boat name | Notes | Ref |
Round the World Races
| 2021 | 1 | 2020-2021 Vendée Globe | IMOCA 60 | Maître Coq IV | time of 80d 03h 44m | |
| 2008 | RET | 2008-2009 Vendée Globe | IMOCA 60 | Aquarelle.com - the Charente-Maritime | Dismasted | |
Transatlantic Races
| 2021 | 9 | Transat Jacques-Vabre | IMOCA 60 | Maître Coq IV | with Jean-Marie Dauris | |
| 2019 | 11 | Transat Jacques-Vabre | IMOCA 60 | Maître Coq IV | with Roland Jourdain | |
| 2019 | DNF | Route du Rhum | IMOCA 60 | Maître Coq (PRB) | | |
| 2018 | RET | Route du Rhum; Destination Guadeloupe | IMOCA 60 | Maître Coq III | retired to technical damage | |
| 2017 | 5 | Transat Jacques-Vabre; Le Havre / Salvador de Bahia | IMOCA 60 | Bastide Otio | with Kito de Pavant | |
| 2015 | 1 | Transat Jacques-Vabre; Le Havre / Itaja (Brazil) | Class40 | The Conservator | with Pierre Brasseur | |
| 2013 | 4 | Transat Jacques-Vabre; Le Havre / Itaja (Brazil) | Class40 | no 98 "watt and sea, Poitou-Charentes Region" | with Aurélien Ducroz | |
| 2011 | 1 | Transat Jacques-Vabre; Le Havre / Puerto Limon (Costa Rica) | Class40 | No. 98 "Aquarelle.com | with Éric Drouglazet | |
| 2008 | 2 | Transat Québec-Saint-Malo | FICO class | "Cervin EnR" | crewed | |
| 2008 | 6 | The Artemis Transat: Plymouth / Boston | IMOCA 60 | "Cervin EnR" | | |
| 2007 | 8 | Transat Ecover BtoB; Salvador de Bahia (Brazil)/ Port-la-Forêt | IMOCA 60 | "Cervin EnR" | | |
| 2007 | 13 | Transat Jacques-Vabre; Le Havre / Salvador de Bahia | IMOCA 60 | "Cervin EnR" | with Ronan Guérin | |
| 2010 | 11 | Transat AG2R La Mondiale; Concarneau / Saint-Barthélemy in the Lesser Antilles | Bénéteau Figaro 2 | | with Christophe Bouvet | |
| 2006 | 7 | Transat AG2R; Concarneau / Saint-Barthélemy (Guadeloupe) | Bénéteau Figaro 2 | "Aquarelle.com" | | |
Other Races
| 2020 | 6 | Vendée-Arctic-Les Sables-d'Olonne | IMOCA 60 | Maître Coq IV | | |
| 2019 | 4 | Azimut Challenge | IMOCA 60 | Maître Coq IV | with Roland Jourdain | |
| 2019 | 6 | Rolex Fastnet | IMOCA 60 | Maître Coq IV | with Roland Jourdain | |
| 2019 | 2 | Bermuda 1000 Solo Race | IMOCA 60 | Maître CoQ IV | | |
| 2019 | 2 | Guyader Grand Prix | IMOCA 60 | Maître CoQ IV | with Roland Jourdain | |
| 2015 | 1 | Les Sables d'Olonne - Horta - Les Sables | Class40 | The Conservator | with Pierre Brasseur | |
| 2015 | 2 | The Normandy Channel Race | Class40 | The Conservator | with Pierre Brasseur | |
| 2014 | 7 | Route du Rhum 2014 | Class40 | n142 "The Conservative" | (arrived 4th but penalized 24 hours) | |
| 2014 | 7 | The Qualif' Solidaire - SNSM | Class40 | No. 142 "The Conservative" | | |
| 2014 | 9 | The Normandy Channel Race | Class40 | No. 142 "The Curator" | with Pierre Brasseur. | |
| 2012 | 3 | Normandy Channel Race | Class40 | No. 98 "Phoenix Europe Express" | with Julien Pulvé | |
| 2012 | 4 | Transat La Solidaire du Chocolat (Nantes - Saint-Nazaire / Progreso in (Mexico) | Class40 | No. 98 "Aquarelle.com" | with Éric Drouglazet | |
| 2011 | 2 | Les Sables-d'Olonne / Horta (Faial in the Azores)/ Les Sables | Class40 | No. 98 "Aquarelle.com" (1st of the 1st stage go) | with Christophe Bouvet (at 25s from 1st) | |
| 2009 | 1 | SNSM Record | IMOCA 60 | Safran | by Marc Guillemot | |
| 2007 | 7 | Cape Istanbul | Bénéteau Figaro 2 | "Aquarelle.com" | with .... | |
| 2007 | 14 | BPE Trophy; Belle-Ile-en-Mer / Marie-Galante in Guadeloupe | Bénéteau Figaro 2 | "Aquarelle.com" | | |
| 2005 | 12 | Ponant Road | | | | |
| 2005 | 28 | Solitaire Afflelou Le Figaro (2nd bizuth) | Bénéteau Figaro 2 | "Aquarelle.com" | | |
| 2005 | 15 | Tour of Brittany sailing | | | | |
| 2005 | 7 | BPE Trophy: St-Nazaire / Cienfuegos de Cuba | Bénéteau Figaro 2 | "Aquarelle.com" | | |
