= IMOCA 60 Safran 3 =

Sailboat

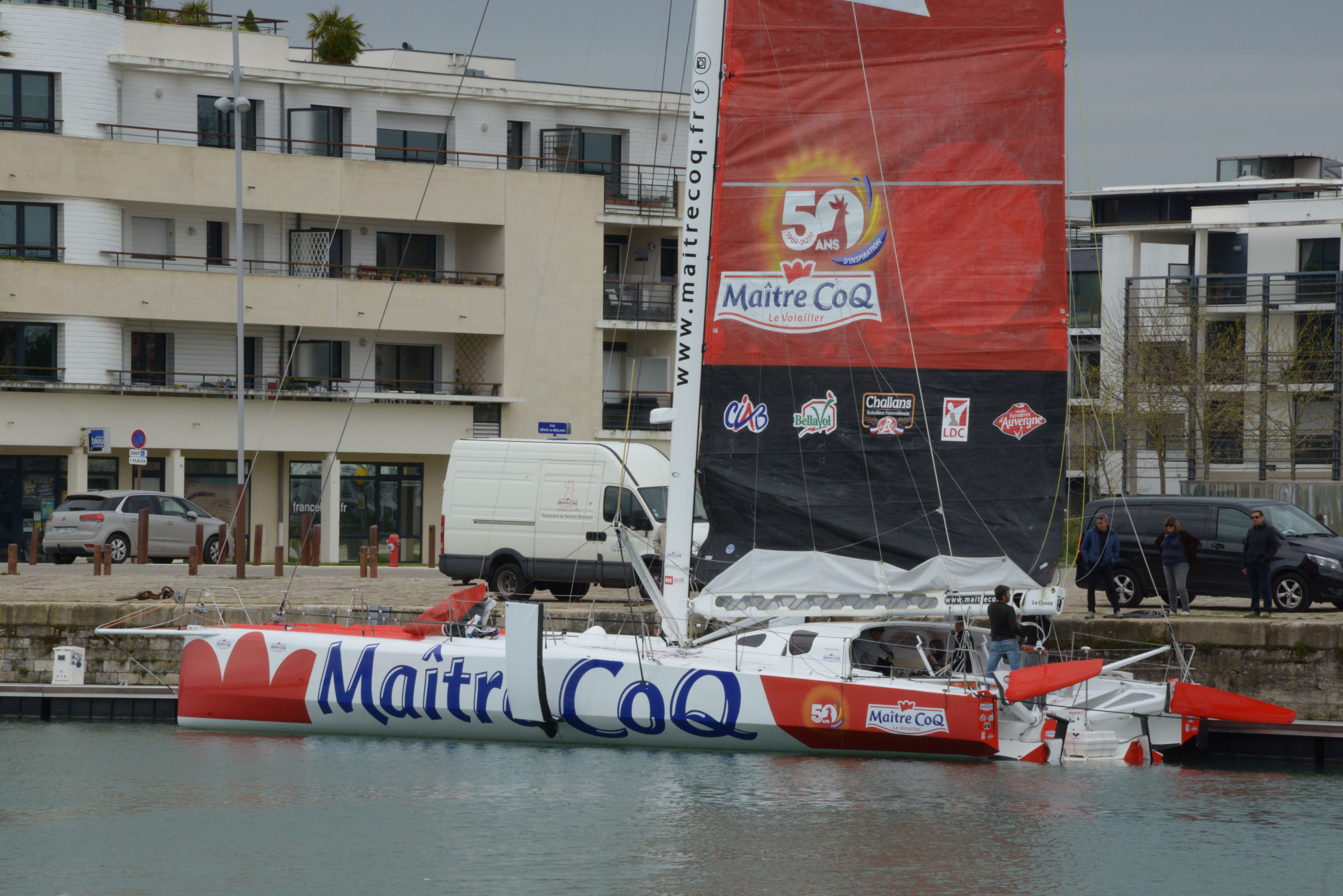

Development
- Designer: Guillaume Verdier, VPLP Design
- Year: 12 March 2015
- Builder: CDK Technologies

Hull
- Hull weight: Carbon Sandwich

Hull appendages
- Keel: Canting Keel
- Ballast: Water Ballast
- Rudder: Twin Rudders

Rig
- Rig type: Rotating Mast with Deck Spreaders

Racing
- Class association: IMOCA 60

The IMOCA 60 class yacht Safran, FRA 25, was designed by Lauriot-Prévost and G. Verdier and launched in the 2015 after being built by CDK Technologies based in Lorient, France.

== Racing results ==
Pos	Year	Race	Class	Boat name	Crew	Time	Notes	Ref
Round the world races
/ 40	2020	2024–2025 Vendée Globe	IMOCA 60	Group Apecil (2)	Damien Seguin (FRA)			
1 / 33	2020	2020–2021 Vendée Globe	IMOCA 60	Maître Coq IV	Yannick Bestaven (FRA)	80d 03h 44m 46s Corrected; 80d 13h 59m 46s Elapsed		
DNF	2016	2016–2017 Vendée Globe	IMOCA 60	Safran (3), FRA 25	Morgan Lagravière (FRA)			
Transatlantic Races
15 /	2023	Transat Jacques Vabre	IMOCA 60	Groupe Apicil (2), FRA 13	Damien Seguin (FRA); Laurent Bourgues (FRA)	14d 06h 52m 17s		
9 / 22	2021	Transat Jacques Vabre	IMOCA 60	Maitre Coq IV, FRA 17	Yannick Bestaven (FRA); Jean-Marie Dauris (FRA)	21d 00h 22m		
11 / 29	2019	Transat Jacques Vabre	IMOCA 60	Maitre Coq IV, FRA 17	Yannick Bestaven (FRA); Roland Jourdain (FRA)	14d 22h 06m		
3 / 13	2017	Transat Jacques Vabre	IMOCA 60	Des Voiles et Vous ! FRA 25	Morgan Lagravière (FRA); Eric Peron (FRA)	14d 01h 31m		
DNF	2015	Transat Jacques Vabre	IMOCA 60	Safran (3), FRA 25	Morgan Lagravière (FRA); Nicolas Lunven (FRA)			
Other Races

== Timeline ==
=== Safran, FRA 25 - Morgan Lagravière ===
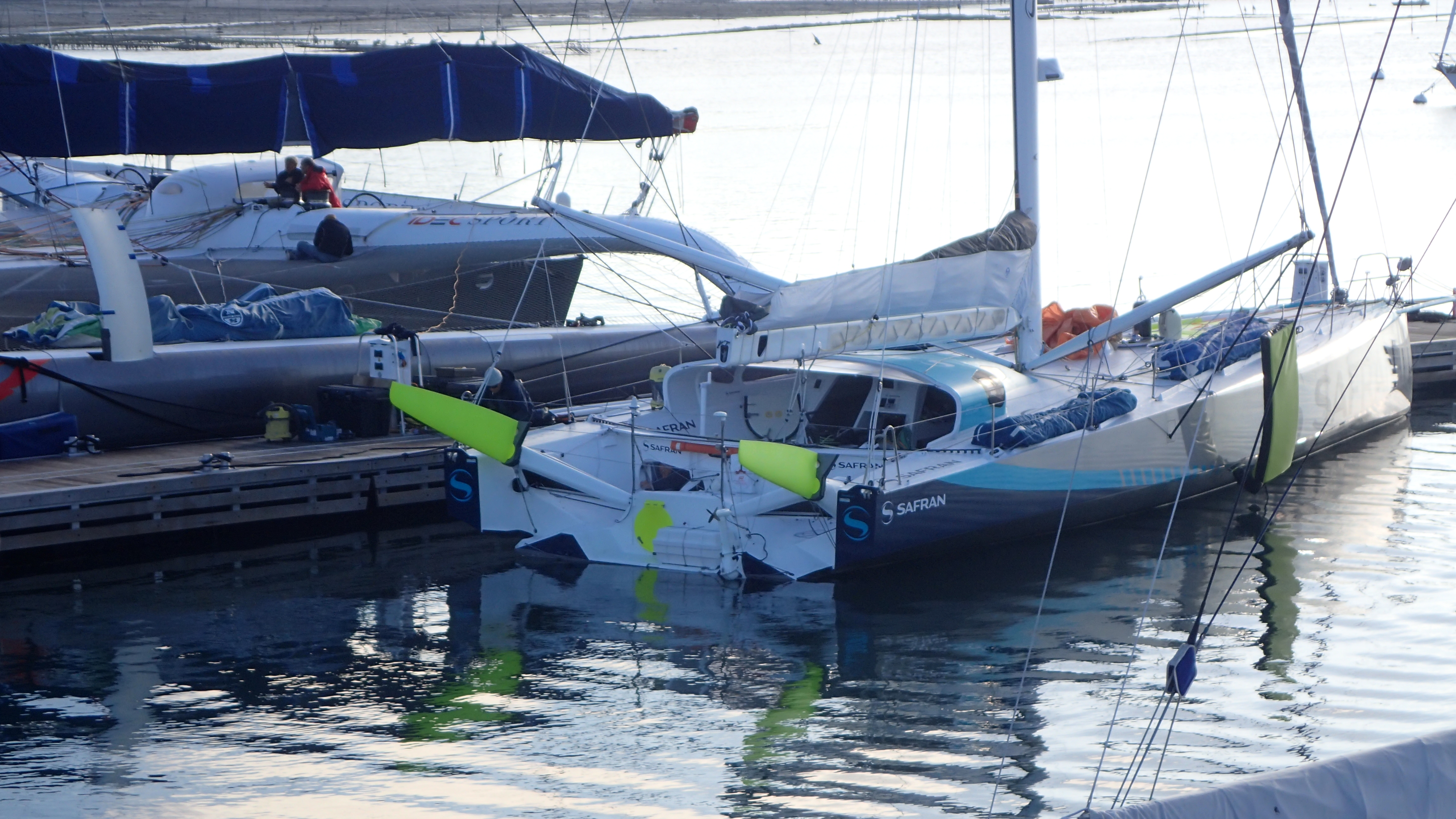

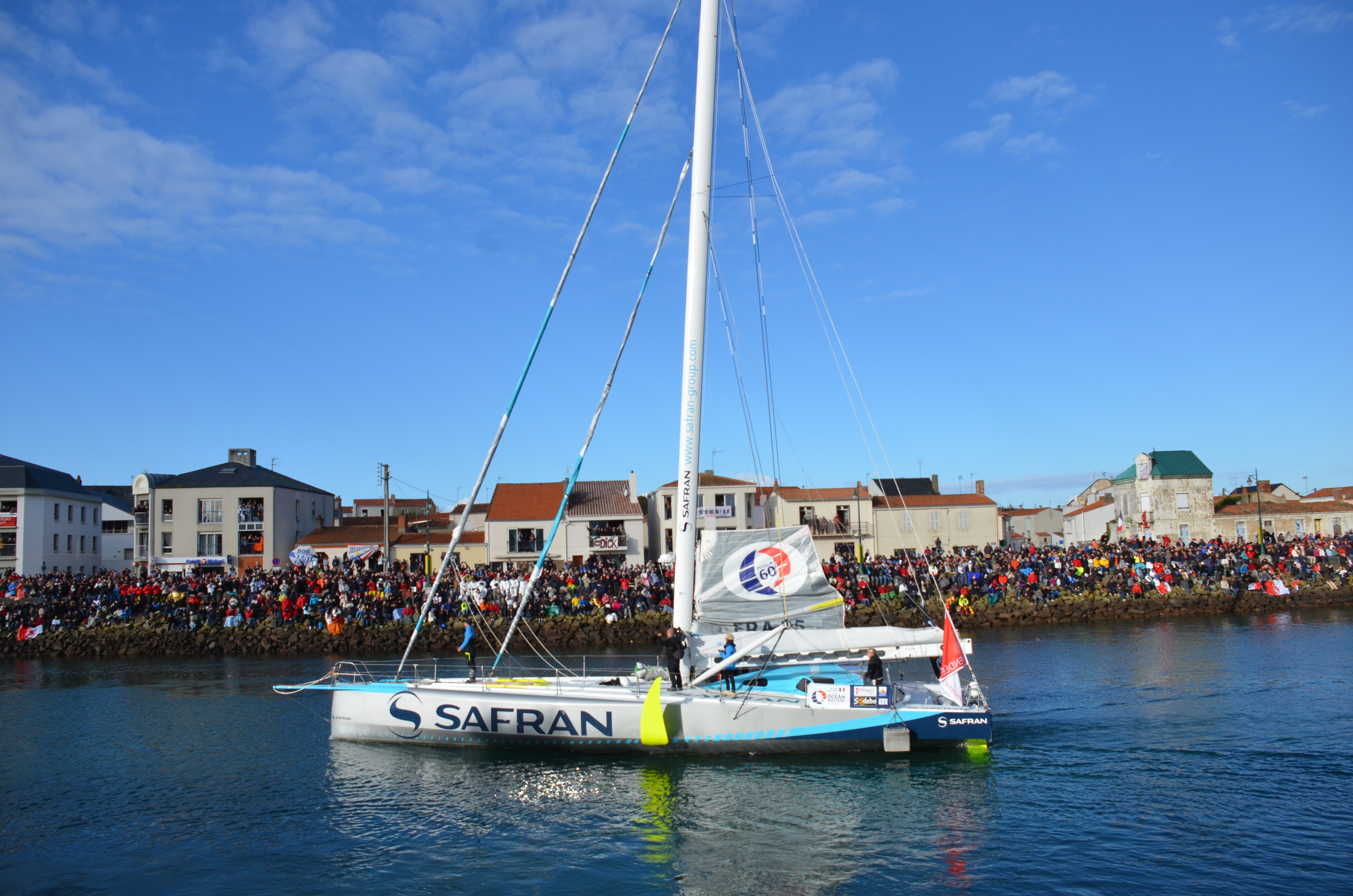

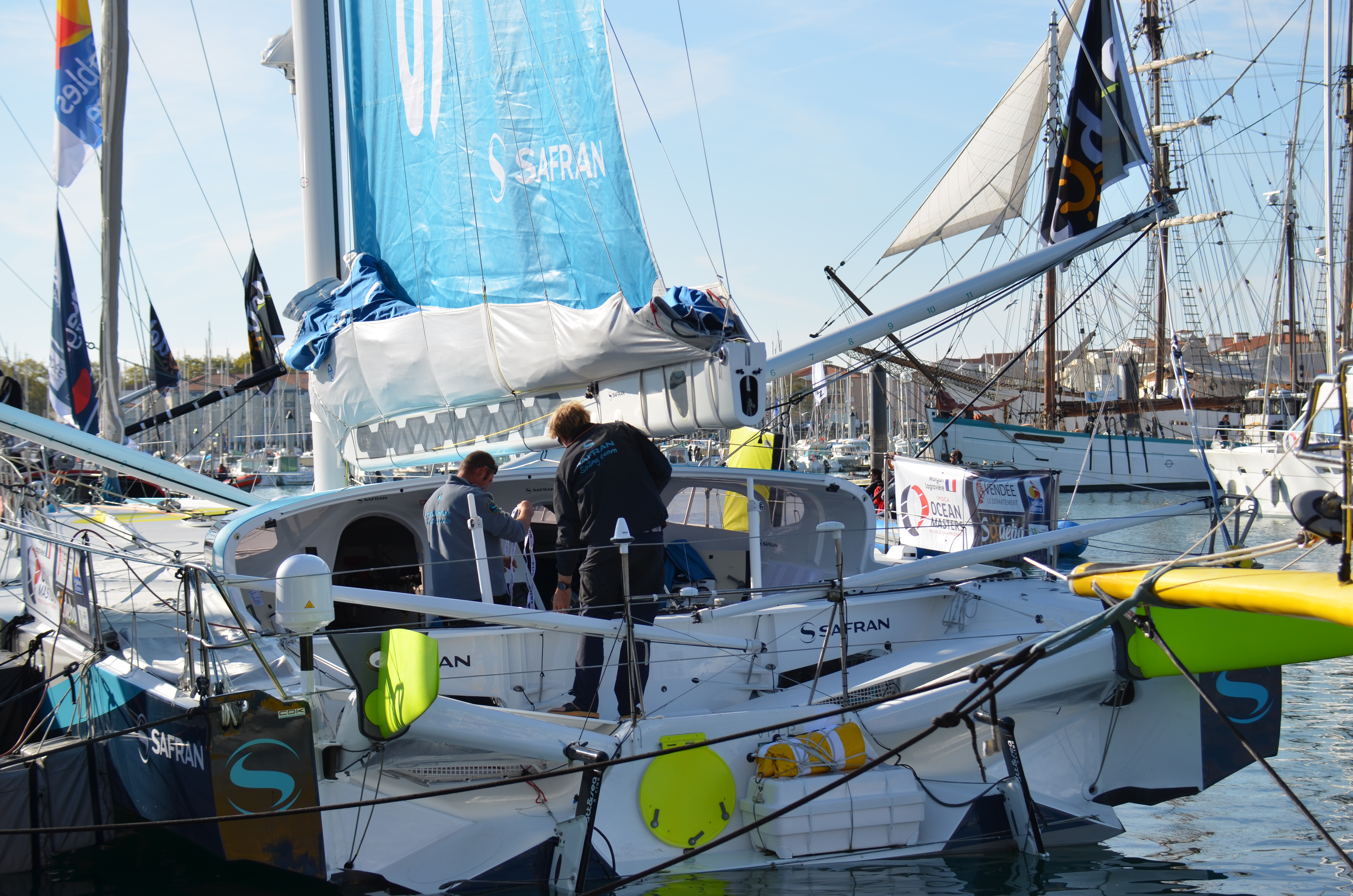

=== Maitre Coq IV, FRA 17 - Yannick Bestaven ===
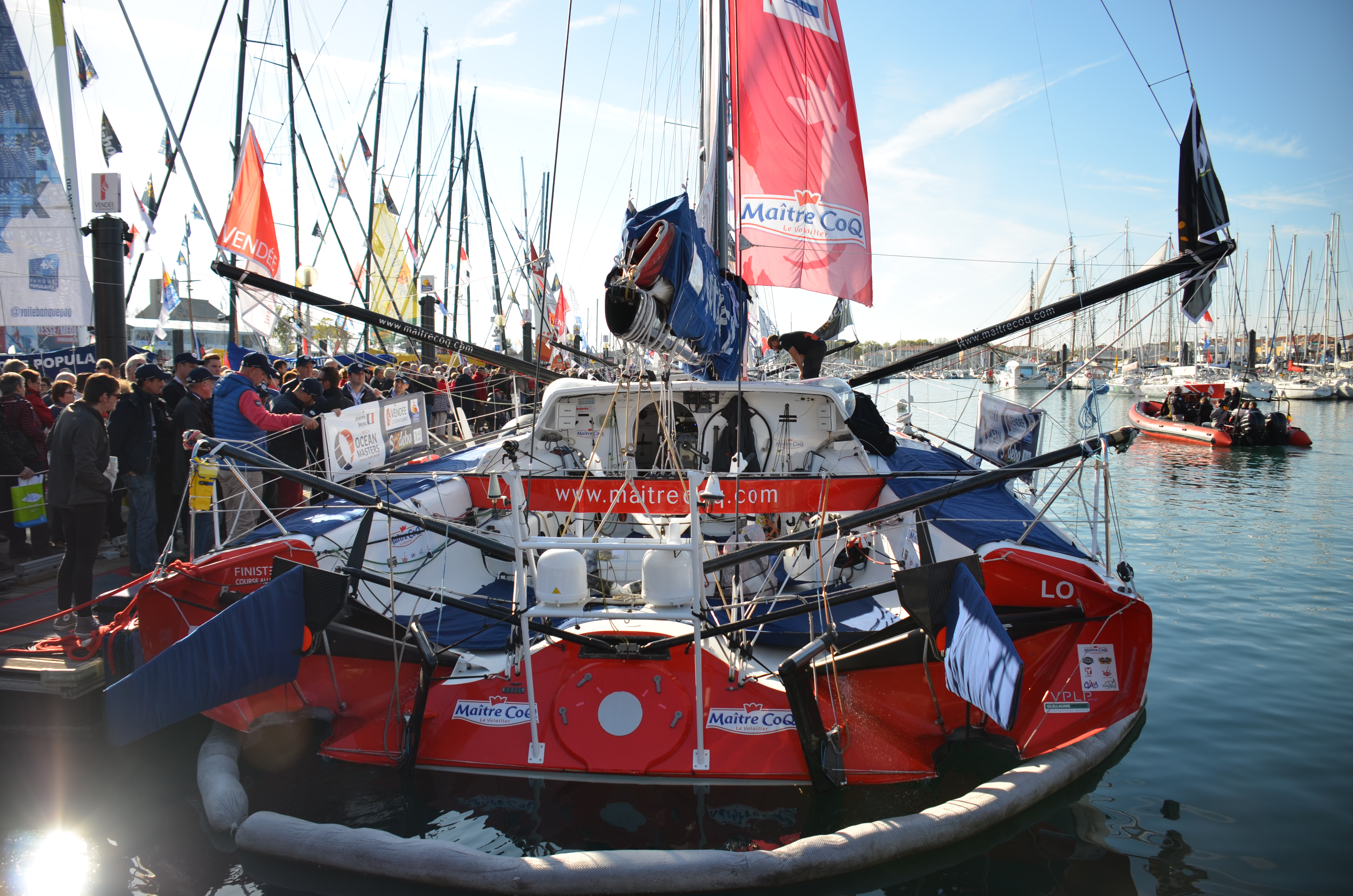

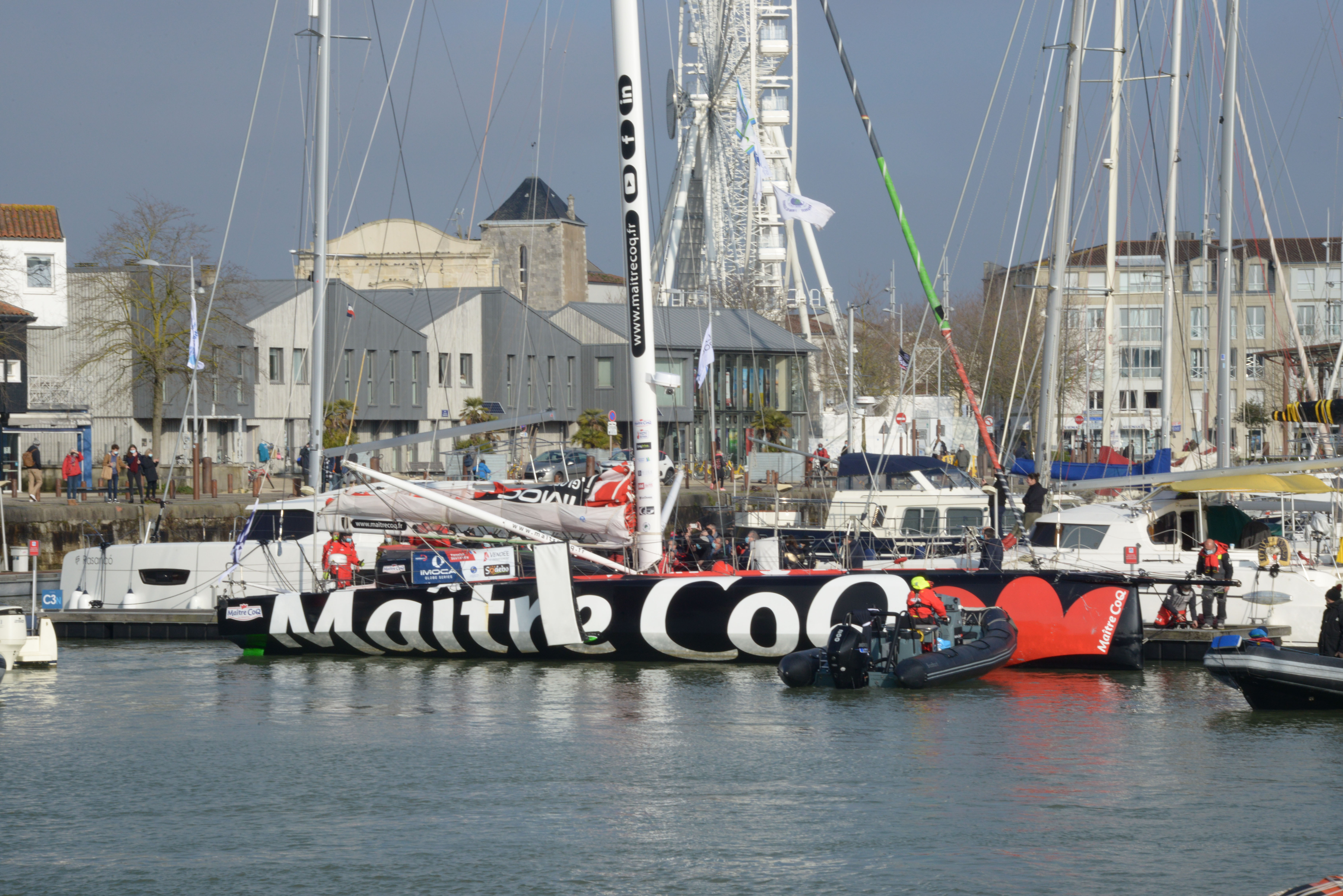

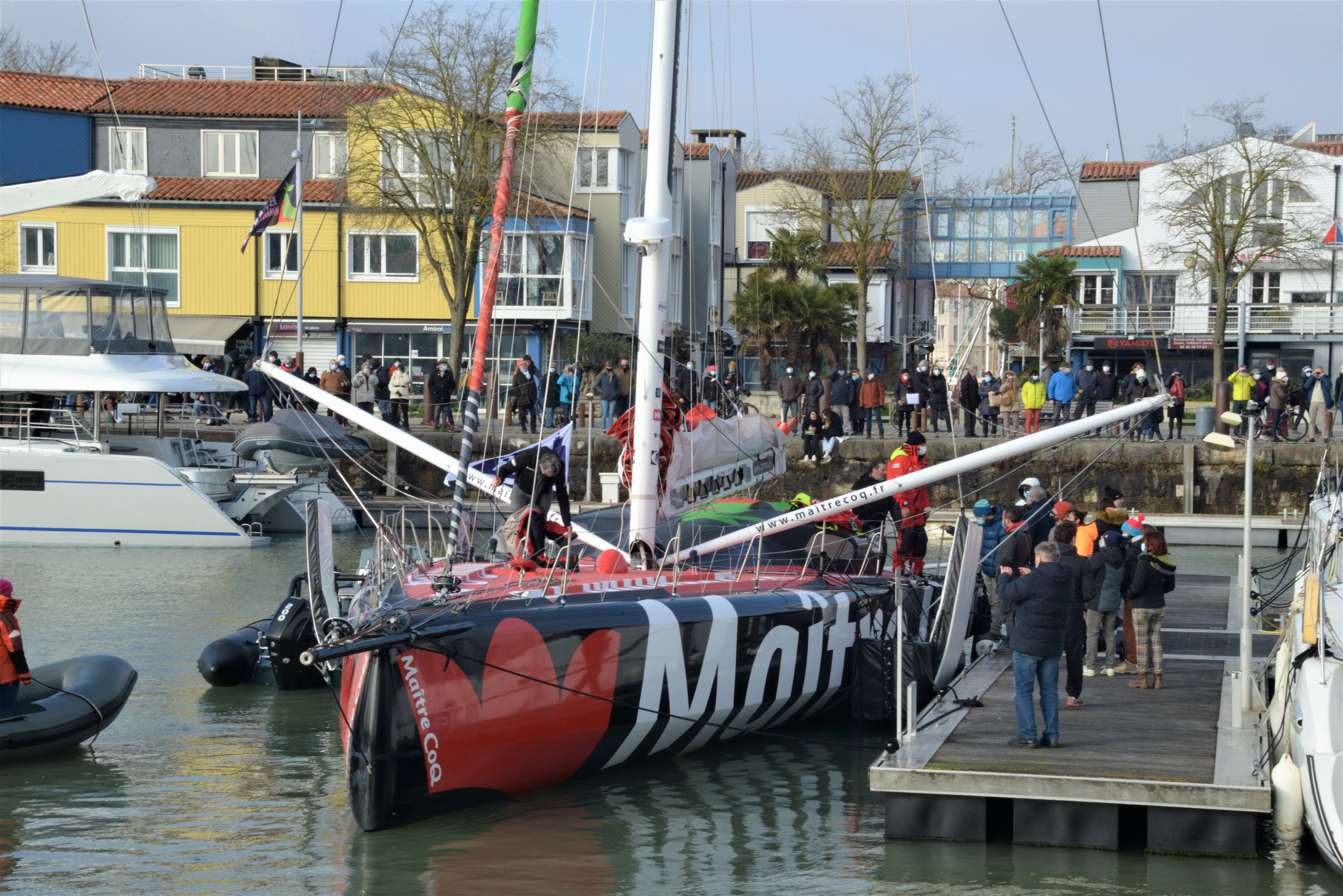

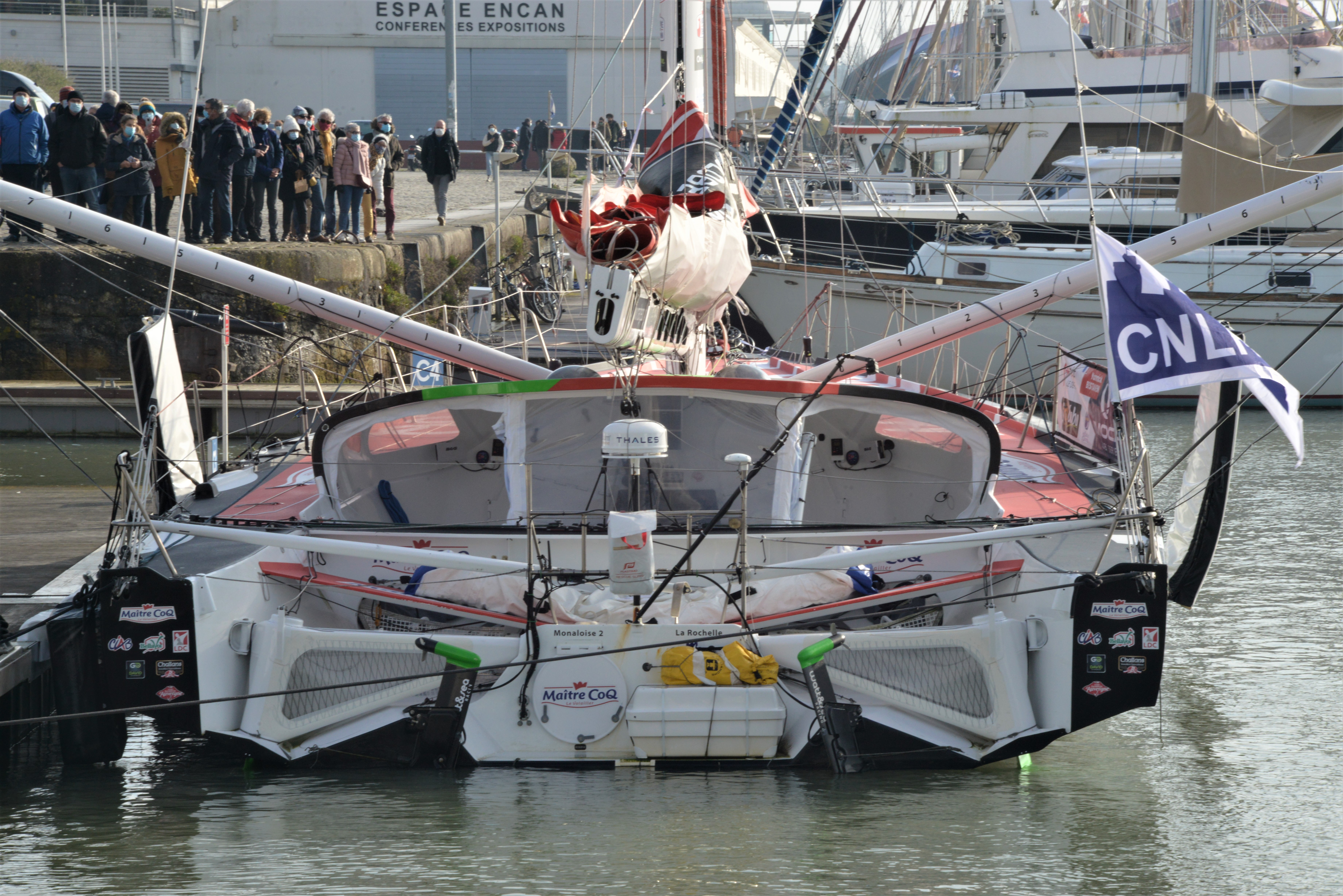

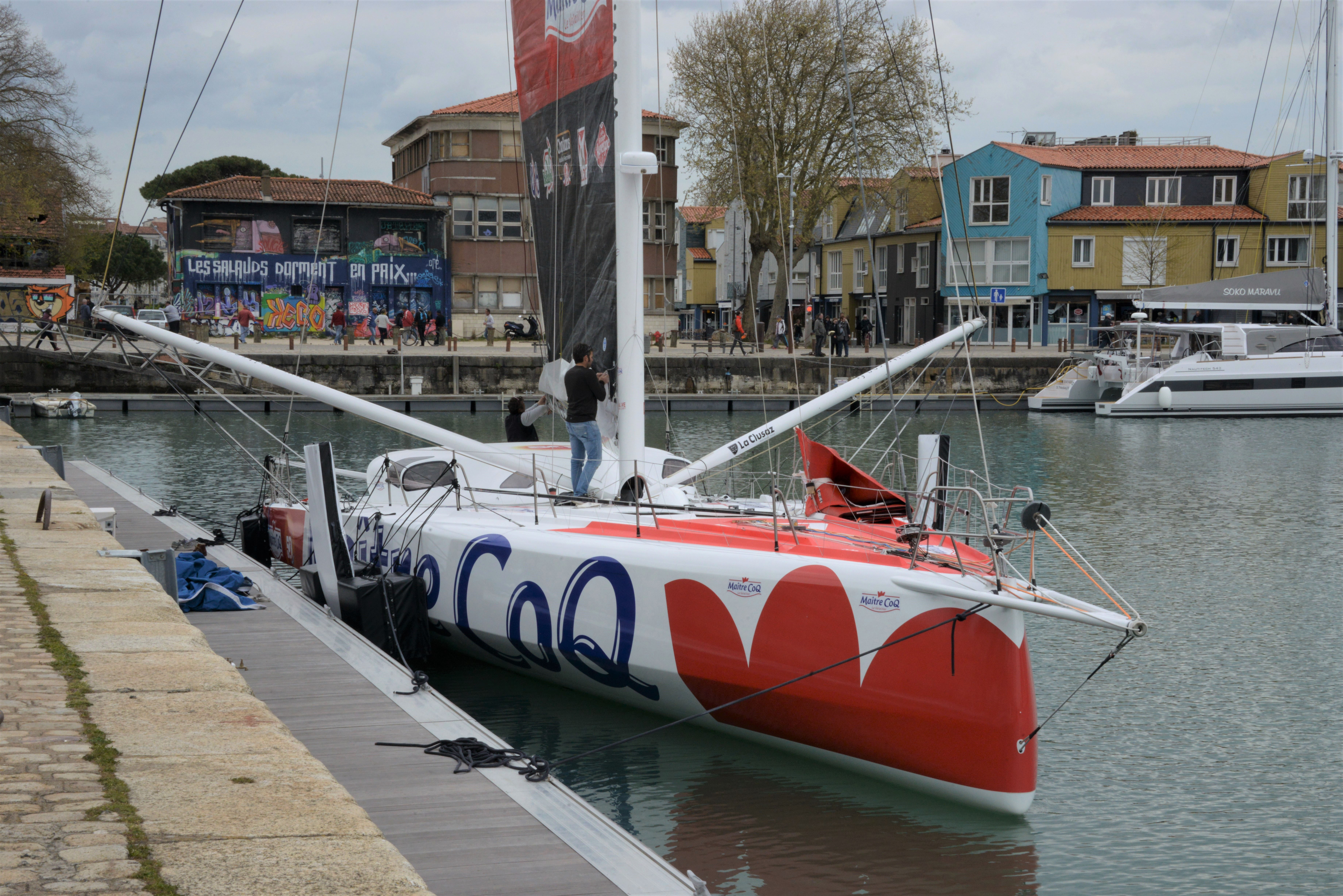

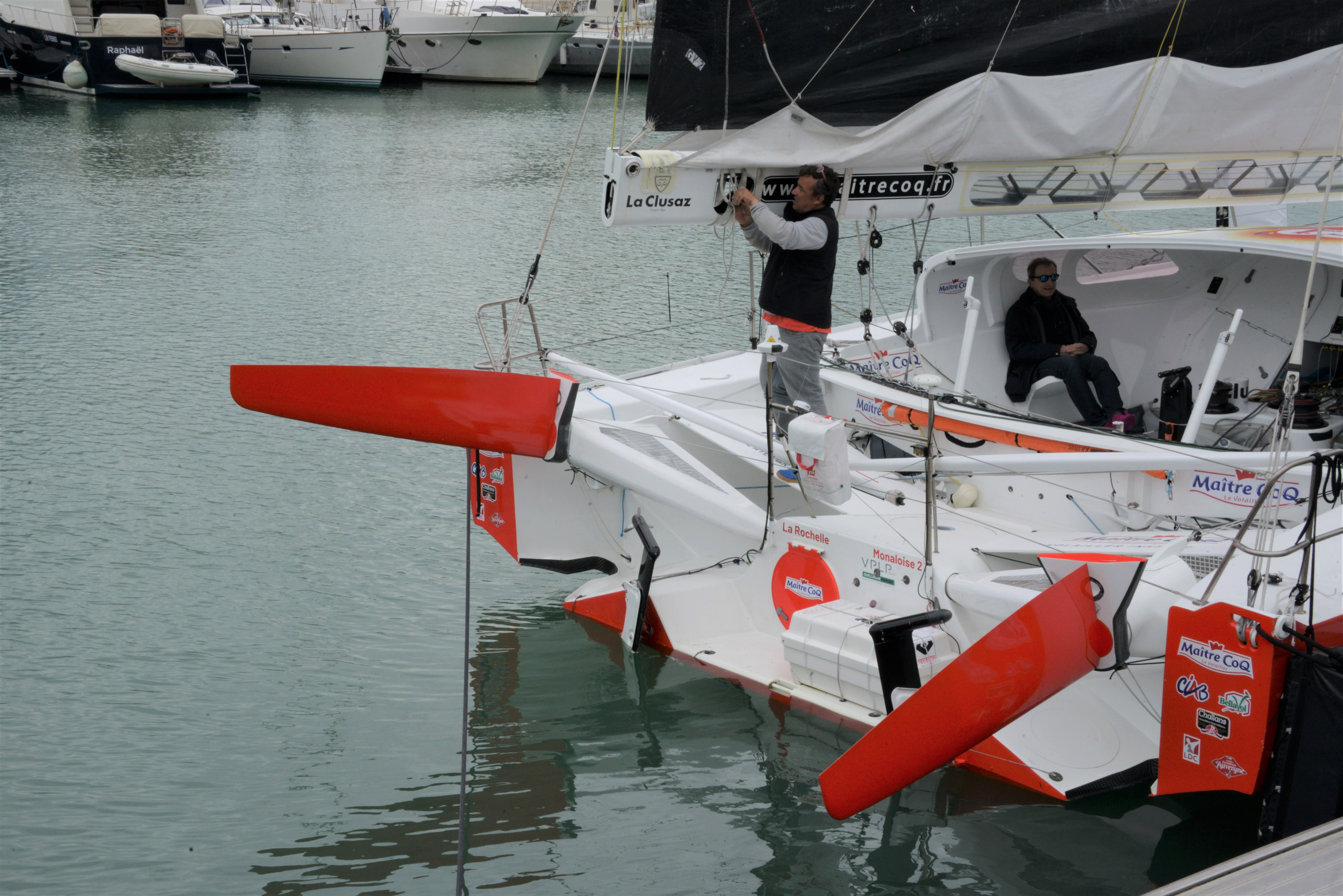

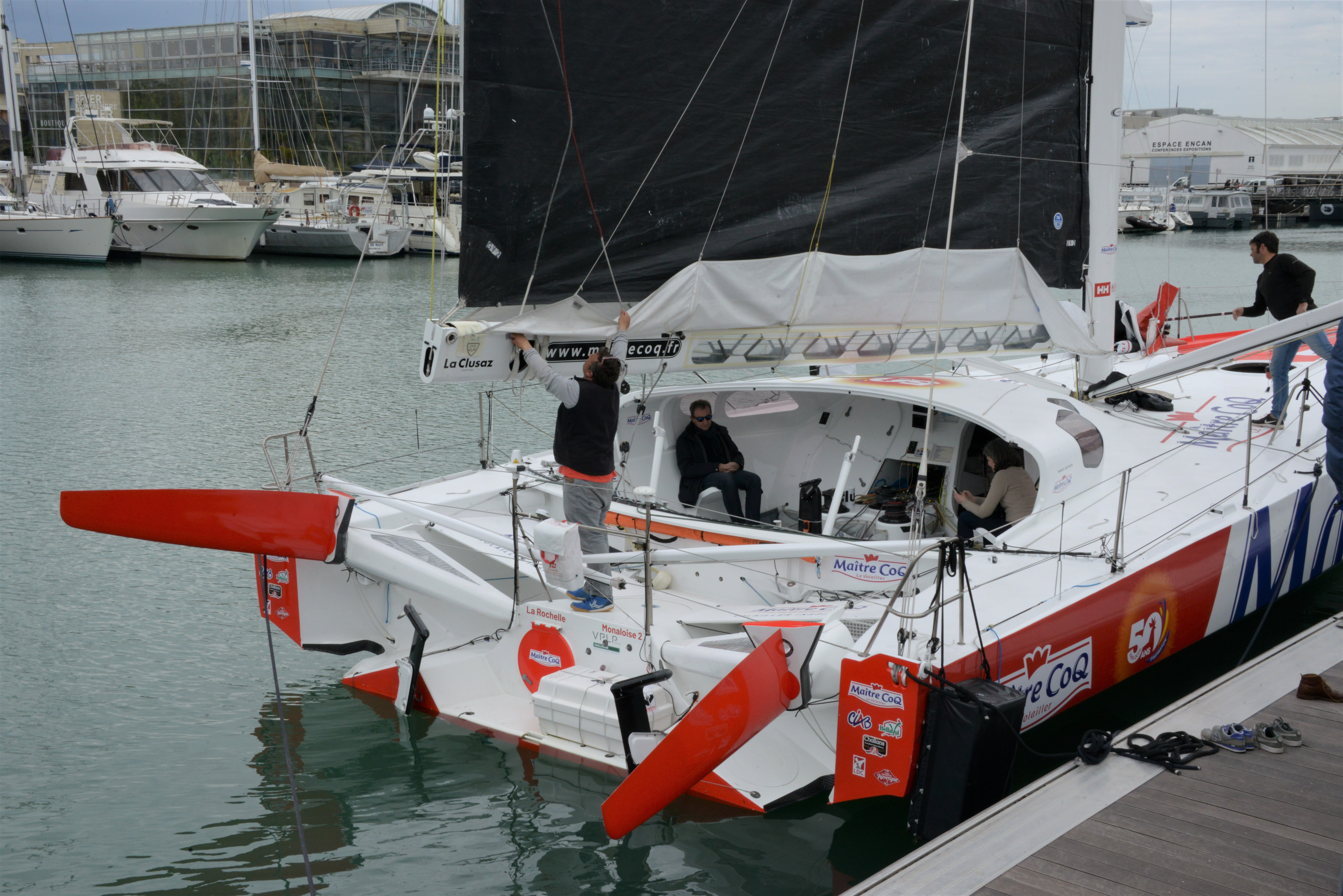

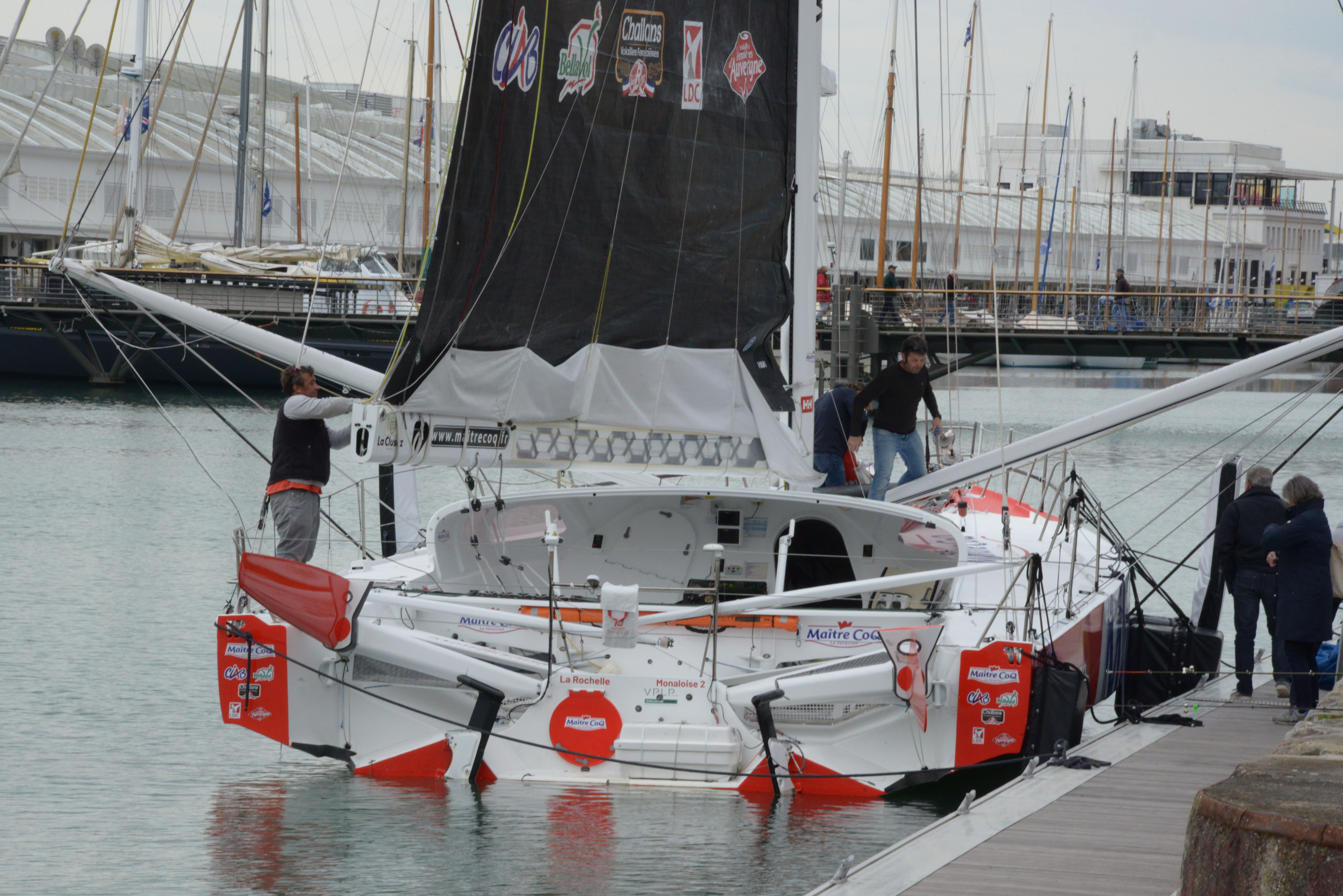

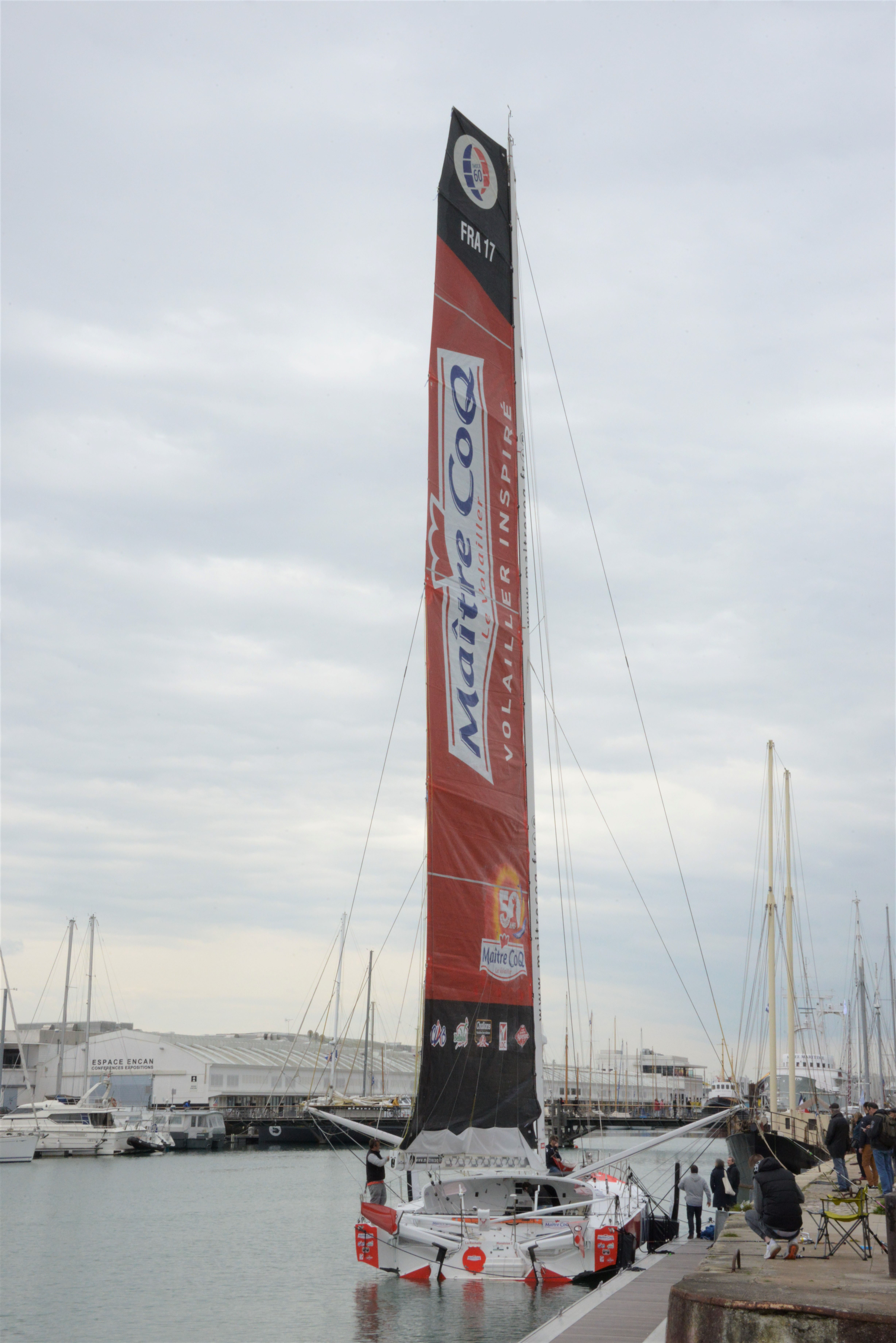

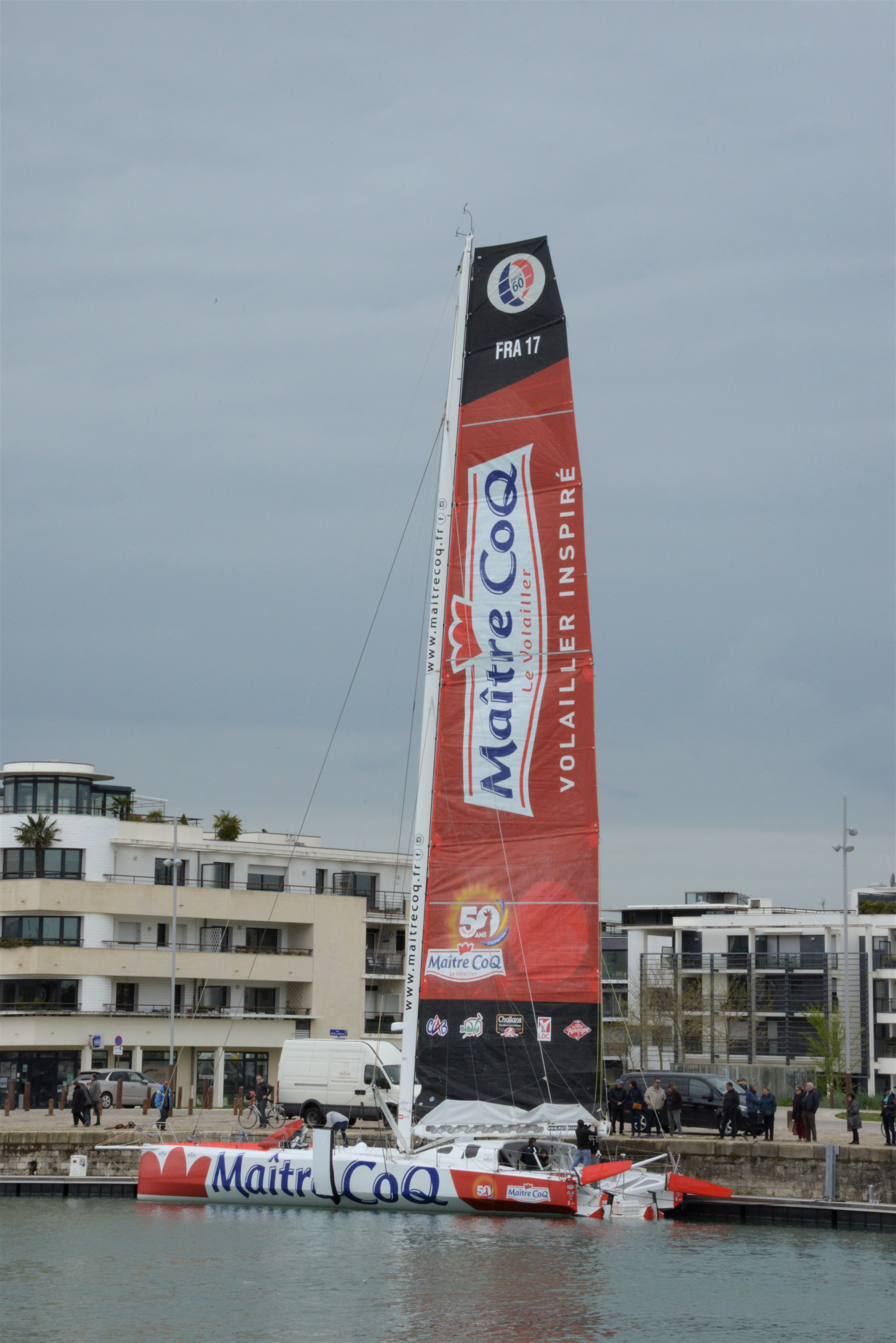

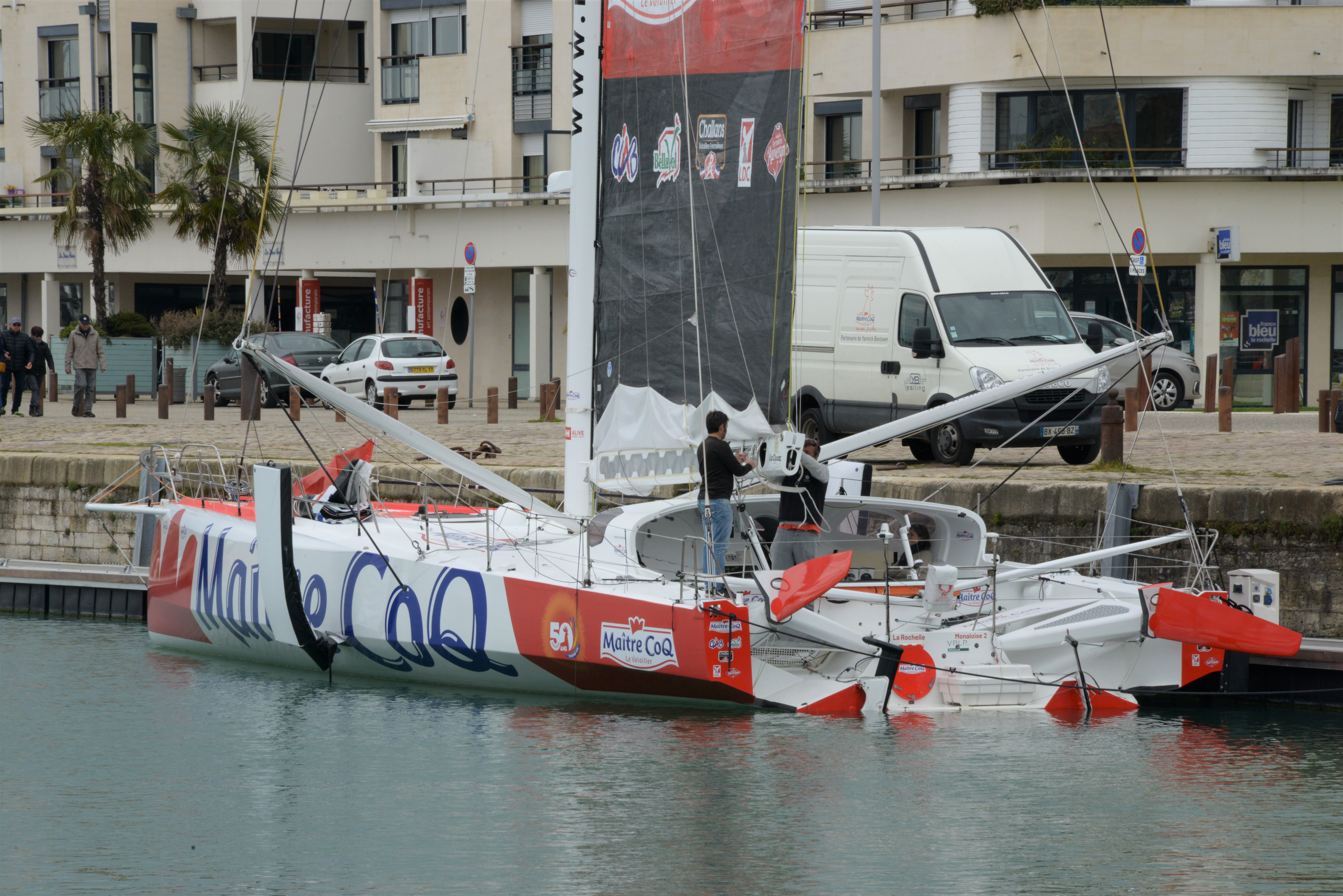

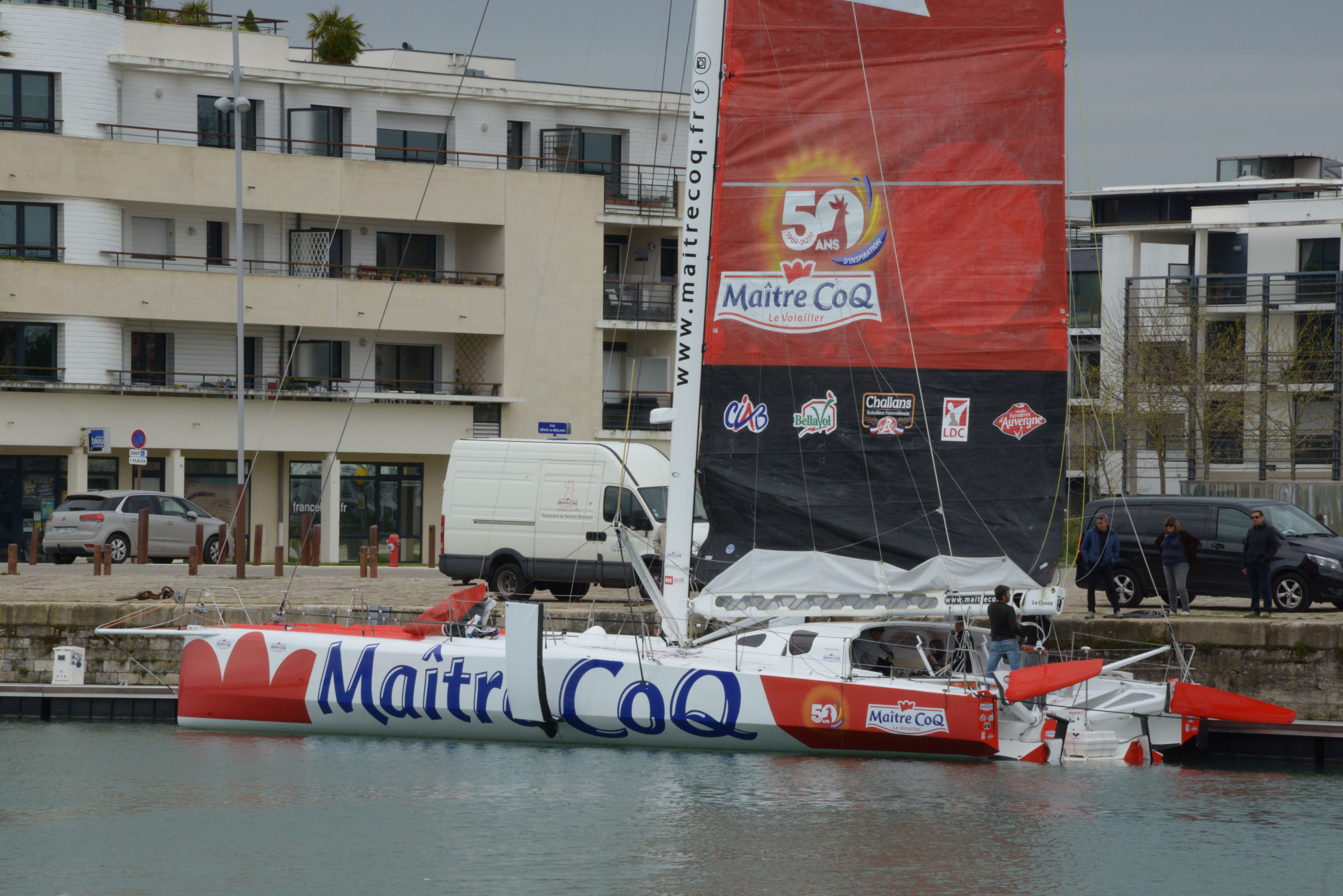

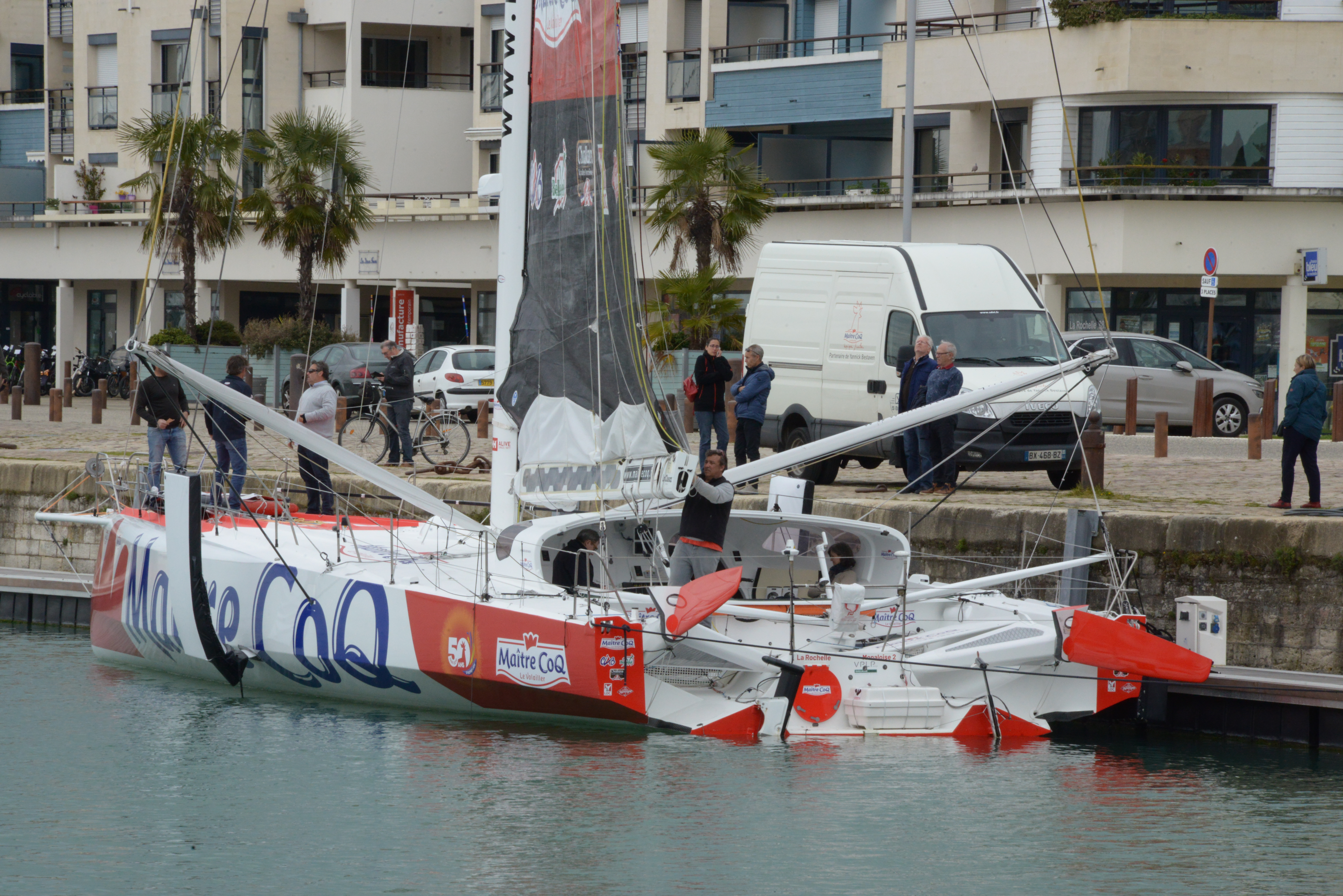
