= Atlantic Cup (sailing) =

The Atlantic Cup is the first and only dedicated Class40 professional sailing race in the United States. It consists of both offshore and inshore legs and was created by Manuka Sports Event Management, which is headquartered in Newport, Rhode Island.

Hugh Piggin, a New Zealand native and sailor who lives in Newport, was intent on changing the face of sailing in the United States. After joining forces with Julianna Barbieri, a sports broadcasting professional, the two created a business plan that would eventually form the Atlantic Cup. The first edition of the race was in 2011. Entrants started in New York City and finished in Newport, with an additional inshore series that was also held in Newport. The race expanded in 2012 to start from Charleston, South Carolina.

The Atlantic Cup competition has three stages: two offshore legs and an inshore series. From 2011 to 2014, the first stage was a 648 nautical mile double-handed leg from Charleston to New York City. The second stage was a 231 nautical mile leg from New York City to Newport. The third and final stage was sailed with a maximum crew of six for a weekend-long inshore series. Beginning in 2016, the Atlantic Cup extended the Leg 2 course to 360 nautical miles with a finish in Portland, Maine. Points are awarded for each race, and the team with the fewest overall combined points from both the offshore and inshore series is crowned Atlantic Cup Champion.

The 2012 race was the first carbon neutral sailing race in the United States. To achieve carbon neutrality, race organizers adopted a 3-part approach: on-land, on-water, and education. On land, single-use plastic water bottles are prohibited. Only glassware or biodegradable cups are used, and recycle stations and water filtration systems for both crew members and guests alike are set up in all three race locations. Event management uses only "100% post-consumer recycled paper" that is used for the printing of collateral material such as event packets, tickets, and handouts. In 2016, the Atlantic Cup was the first sporting event in the United States to be ISO 20121 compliant.

2016 Race Results

Place	Team	Leg 1	Leg 2	Inshore Races					Total Points
Place	Team	Leg 1	Leg 2	Race 1	Race 2	Race 3	Race 4	Race 5	Total Points
1	123 - Tales II	18	18	9	9	8	7	(6)	69
2	145 - Eärendil	16	16	6	6	9	8	(5)	61
4	118 - Oakcliff**	14	10	(4)	5	7	5	9	50
3	128 - Toothface**	6	14	8	8	6	(4)	8	50
5	54 - Dragon	10	8	7	(4)	5	9	7	46
6	127 - Amhas	12	6	5	7	(4)	6	4	40
7	95 - Talanta	8	8*	(3)	3	3	3	3	28
8	39 - Pleiad	4	DNS	RET	RET	RET	RET	RET	4
9	102 - Privateer	RET	RET	RET	RET	RET	RET	RET	0

2014 Race Results

PLACE	Team	Leg 1	Leg 2	In Shore Races					Inshore	Total
PLACE	Team	Leg 1	Leg 2	1	2	3	4	5	Points	Points
1	106 - Gryphon Solo 2	10	6	3	4	4	4	3	15	31
2	116 - JeffreyMacFarlane.com	4	10	4	5	3	3	5	17	31
3	39 - Pleiad	6	4	5	3	5	5	4	19	29
4	54 - Dragon	8	8	0	0	0	0	0	0	16
5	25 - Flatline	0* - DNS	2	2	2	2	2	2	8	10

2013 Race Results

Inshore Racing & Overall Point Standings
	Leg	Leg	Inshore #1	Inshore #2	Inshore #3	Inshore #4	Inshore #5	Inshore Points	Total Points
Team	1	2	1	2	3	4	5		
#118 Bodciaous Dream	14	14	5	2	7	5	6	23	51
#121 Lecoq Cuisine	12	12	7	5	5	4	3	21	45
#116 Icarus	8	6	6	7	6	7	7	27	41
#106 Gryphon Solo 2	6	10	4	4	4	6	5	19	35
#90 40 Degrees	10	4	1	3	2	3	4	12	26
#54 Dragon	4	8	2	6	1	1	1	10	22
#39 Pleiad	2	2	3	1	3	2	2	10	14

2012 Race Results

Number, Name, Country of Boat	Combined Final Point Standings After All Three Legs of Competition	Total Points
No. 115 Mare - GER (Jörg Riechers, Ryan Breymaier, Charles Euvrete)	2, 1, 1, 1	11
No. 118 Bodacious Dream - USA (Dave Rearick, Matt Scharl)	5, 5, 6, 3	27
No. 106 Gryphon Solo 2 - USA (Joe Harris, Tristian Mouligne)	4, 3, 2, 8	39
No. 101 Campagne De France - FRA (Halvard Mabire)	8, 9, 9, 3	39
No. 30 Initiatives - USA (Emma Creighton, Rob Windsor)	1, 2, 4, 5	42
No. 54 Dragon - USA (Michael Hennessy, Christopher Museler)	7, 3, 2, 1	47
No. 105 Eole Generation- GDF SUEZ - FRA (Sebastien Rogues)	6, 4, 5, 4	47
No. 109 Talan-Bureau Veritas - FRA (Stephane Le Diraison, Jesse Naimark-Rowse)	3, 6, 5, 6	52
#116 Icarus Racing - USA (Ben Poucher, Tim Fetsch)	10, 11, 7, 4	58
No. 73 Toothface - USA (Mike Dreese, Ken Luczynski)	9, 8, 7, 9	69
No. 113 Partouche - FRA (Christophe Coatnoan, Ari Sebag)	13, 7, 10, 12	82
No. 17 Transport Cohérence - FRA (Benoít Jouandet, Jorge Madden)	11, 13, 13, 11	84
No. 20 Sevenstar Yacht Transport - FRA (Dan Valoppi, Anna-Maria Renken)	14, 14, 14, 14	88
No. 85 Groupe Picoty - FRA (Jacques Fournier, Jean-Christophe "JC" Caso)	12, 12, 12, 13	89
No. 90 40 Degrees * - GBR (Hannah Jenner, Peter Harding)	DNF (Did Not Finish)	N/A
* Retired during Leg No. 1 due to a broken mast		

2011 Race Results

	Inshore No. 1	Inshore No. 2	Inshore No. 3	Inshore No. 4	Inshore No. 5	Inshore No. 6	Off-Shore	Total points
Cutlass/ 11th Hour Racing	1	1	1	1	1	1	4	10
Dragon	2	3	2	4	4	4	2	21
Toothface	3	4	4	2	2	3	6	24
Icarus	4	2	3	3	3	2	8	25
