= Mini Transat Race =

Transatlantic yacht race

- First held: 1977
- Type: single-handed offshore race
- Classes: Mini Transat 6.50
- Start: Douarnenez
- Finish: Pointe-à-Pitre
- Length: 4,020 nautical miles (7,450 km; 4,630 mi)
- Competitors: 72 (2015)
- Champions: Francois Jambou (proto); Ambrogio Beccaria (série)
- Website: minitransat.fr/en/

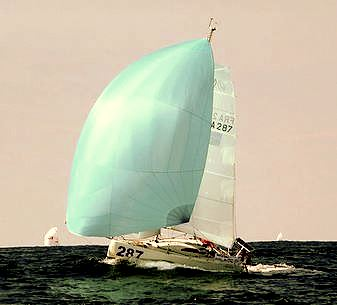
Mini transat 2007

Mini Transat is a solo transatlantic yacht race which typically starts in France and ends in the Caribbean. The race uses small 6.5 metres (21 ft) long yachts conforming to the Mini Transat 6.50 class rules which gives considering scope for development. More recently, this has led to the formation of two divisions within the class: the production class that limits development and costs, and the prototype class which allows for more flexibility in dimensions and technology.

== Background ==
=== History ===
Bob Salmon developed the idea of a mini-transatlantic race in the late 1970s in England with the intent of promoting affordable offshore solo racing. It was partially conceived as a response to the trend for bigger and more expensive boats such as those sailed in the OSTAR race that seemed to exclude ocean racing for sailors with moderate budgets.

The first Mini Transat started from the Penzance Sailing Club in 1977 and races have since been run biannually in odd-numbered years. There was a move to Brest, France in 1985, and since then, it has started at various locations in France, such as Brittany, La Rochelle or Charente-Maritime, with a stop at the Canary Islands or Madeira, ending in the West Indies or Brazil.

The Miniclasse 6.50 closely monitors the craft but applies minimal design restrictions, such as length (6.5m), beam (3.0m), draft (approximately 2.0m)

The race runs in odd-numbered years, and was most recently completed in 2019. Sailors had to qualify by covering one of two specified 1,000-mile courses, in addition to having 1,500 miles of ocean racing experience, much of it solo.

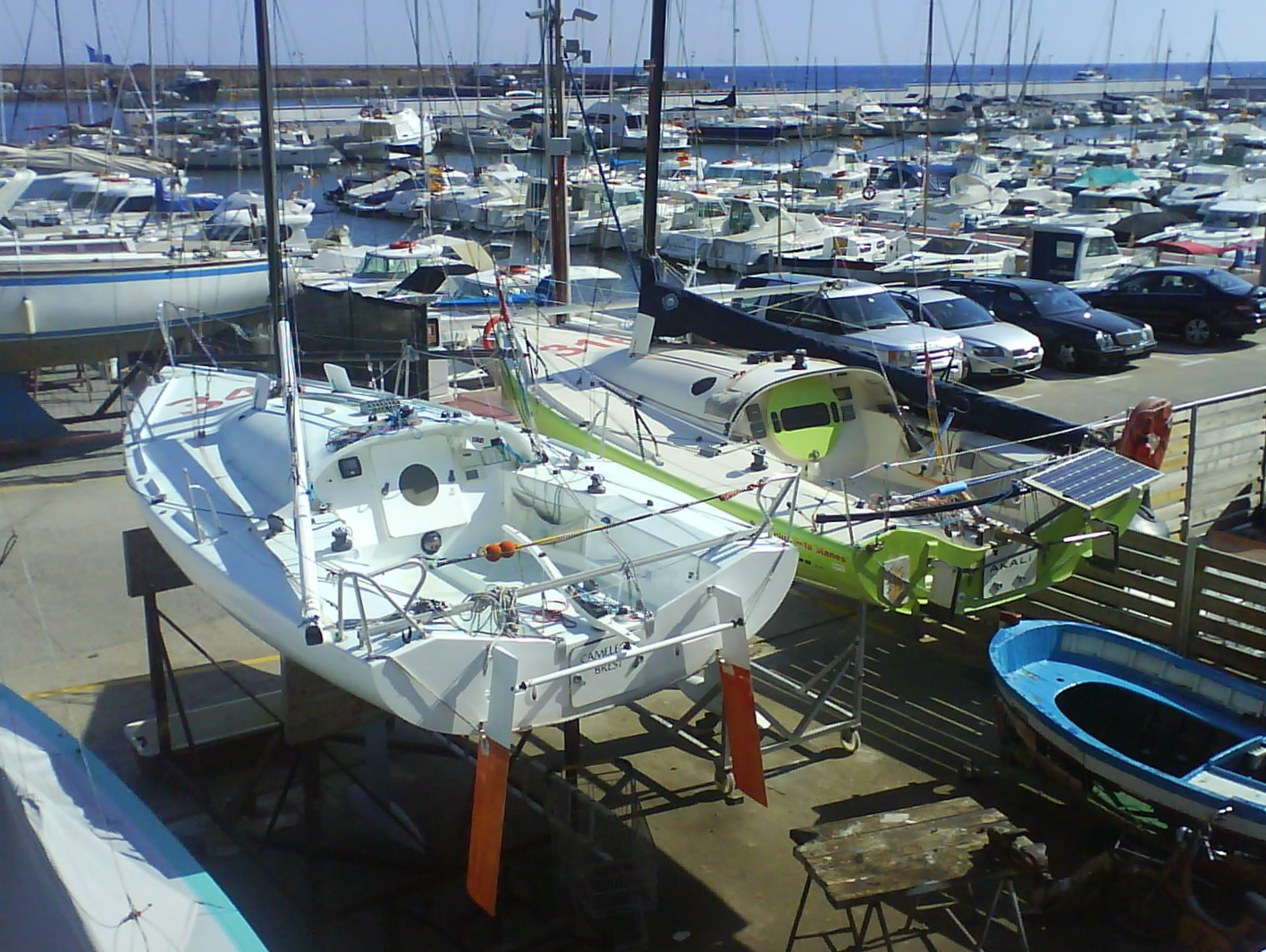
Two Mini 6.50 sailboats along the Spanish Mediterranean. Note the width of the sterns that allows minis to reach high speeds by planing.

=== Race culture ===
There are no prizes and the Mini Transat is not necessarily considered a race for the win. Sailors are competitive yet mutually supportive during training and preparations, they tend to be closely grouped during the race, and a race completion is seen as a personal or national victory that comes with intangible rewards. Non-completion means, at very least, loss of the mini. The race is considered dangerous and there was a drowning during the first leg of the 2009 race. Racers typically sleep only 20 minutes at a time and rely on computerized autopilot systems to keep the craft on course while they sleep. The class is considered an incubator for professional ocean racing as a proving ground for sailing skills, as well as a test platform for larger ocean classes such as the Open 60.

Other than the single-handed transatlantic crossing, there are a number of other races held for the class. In-between years see double-handed events, such as the Mini Fastnet, Mini Barcelona, Select 650 and Open Demi-Cle. The Transat years incorporate more single-handed events.

== Equipment ==
=== Mini Transat 6.50 ===
Classe Mini Logo, Mini Transat 6.50, unofficial logo

For its intended use, racing across the Atlantic Ocean, the Mini 6.50 is very short and beamy, being nearly half as wide as it is long. Its width carries to the stern, providing sufficient stability that the boats can plane as a fast motorboat does: Minis are capable of sailing as fast as 25 knots. They typically have two connected rudders and a narrow steel or iron fin keel with a lead bulb at the end, with a mast height typically twice the Mini's length. They also have a retractable bowsprit that extends a spinnaker-genoa "kite" two or more meters beyond the bow. Minis must be self-righting when capsized, and this is tested by pushing the end of the mast under water with the vessel's hatches open; this design avoids the possibility of turtling.

There are two divisions: production and prototype. Production boats use approved designs and comparatively conservative materials. The prototype division is more liberal with respect to dimensions, such as keel depth and mast height, and it allows for advanced technology such as "canting" keels and carbon-fibre masts. The prototype class is approximately 7% faster. By far, the most successful mini design is the commercially produced Pogo 2 designed by Jean-Marie Finot of Groupe Finot (now Finot-Conq) in 1995.

=== Criticism ===
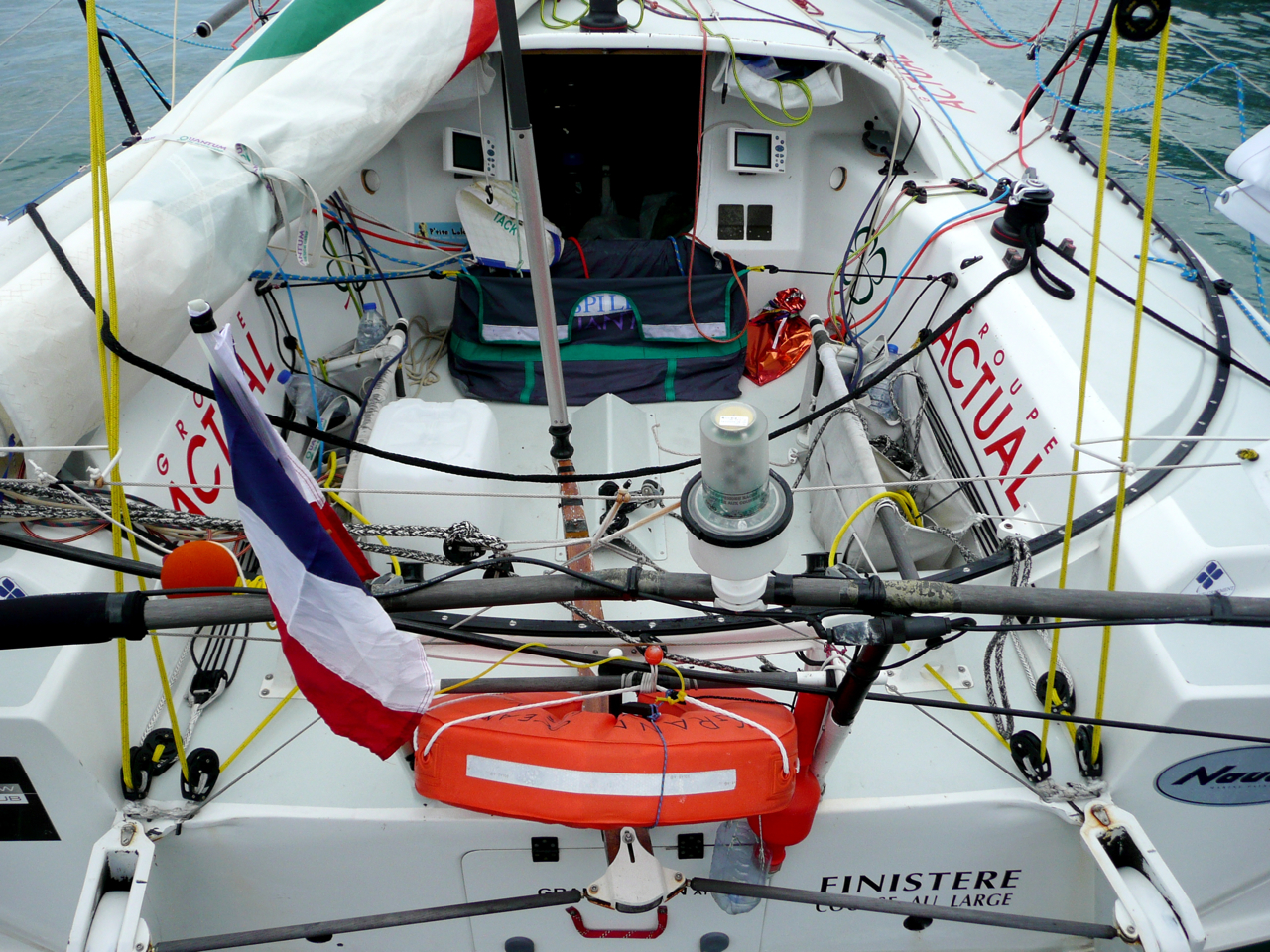
View to cockpit from stern

In response to the perceived challenge of sailing small high-performance single handed boats, Classemini has created rigorous trials, equipment, and inspection requirements to add sanity to the race. Also, it might be said that the division within the class, production vs. prototype, unnecessarily divides the race. The mini Transat remains a largely French race with only about 30% non-French racers.

The 650 class is admitted to be a "test bed" for mechanisms to be used on bigger and far more expensive open classes. On the other hand, David Raison's Mini introduces a whole new hull shape with its 2011 victory, which may, in fact, revolutionize open ocean racing if not sailing altogether; (Note: The Magnum begat an even more radical 'semi-flying' scow that uses a host of design tricks, including wings/foils and a telescopic canting keel, a retractable bowsprit and an Asymmetrical spinnaker, has been designed in France.) and the 2011 race suffered no casualties.

== Course ==
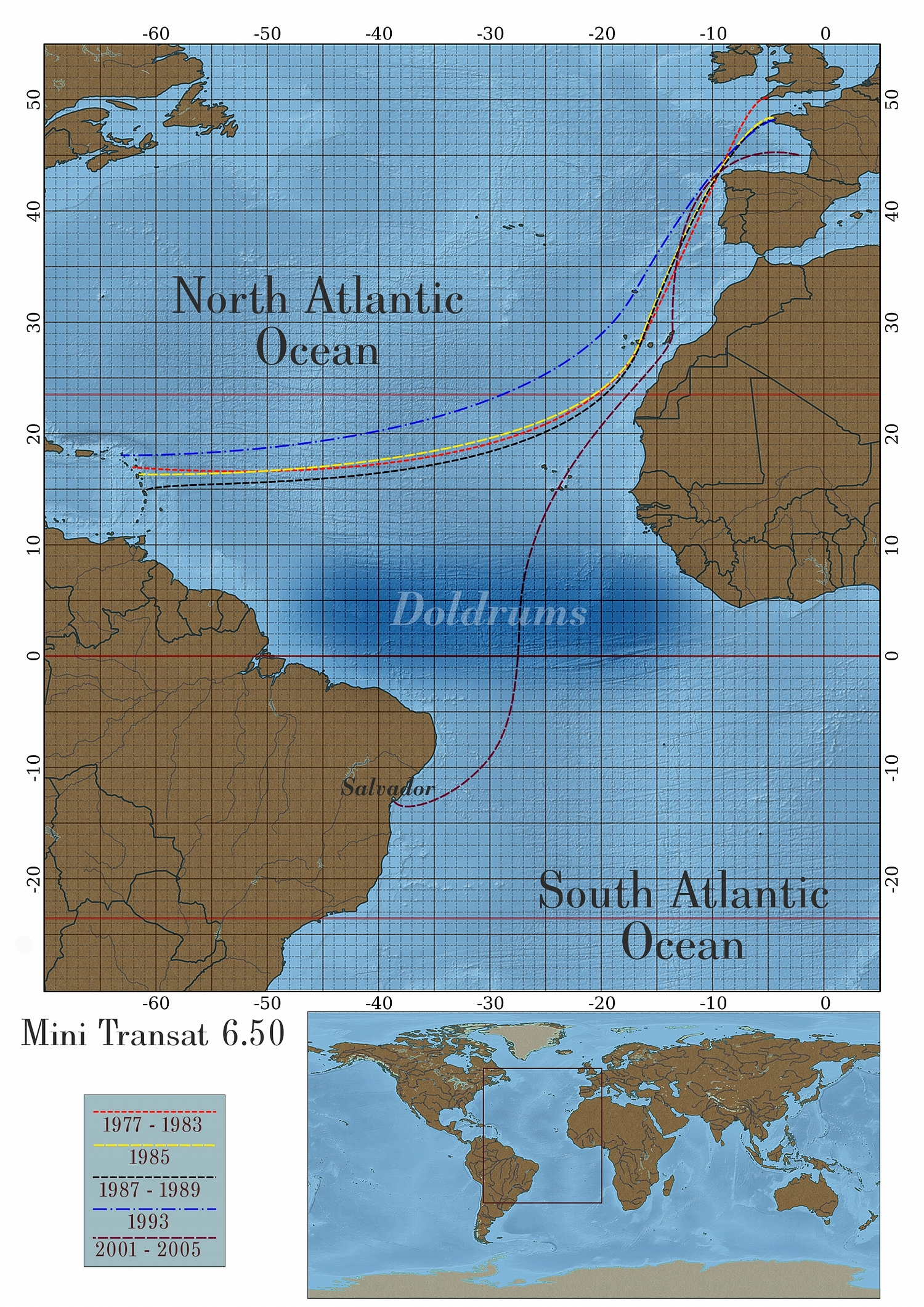
Route Maps

Year	Winning Time	Course	Distance	Ref
1977	38d 11h 10m	Penzance / Tenerife / Antigua		
1979	32d 08h 10m	Penzance / Tenerife / Antigua		
1981	32d 20h 22m	Penzance / Tenerife / Antigua		
1983	31d 14h 45m	Penzance / Tenerife / Antigua		
1985	31d 14h 45m	Brest / Tenerife / Pointe-à-Pitre		
1987	30d 06h 41m	Concarneau / Tenerife / Fort-de-France		
1989	28d 07h 33m	Concarneau / Tenerife / Fort-de-France		
1991	29d 04h 37m	Douarnenez / Tenerife / Fort-de-France		
1993		Brest / Funchal (Madeira) / Saint-Martin (Antilles)		
1995	27 j 07 h 21 min	Brest / Funchal (Madère) / Fort-de-France		
1997	38d 11h	Brest / Tenerife / Saint-Martin (Antilles)		
1999	24d 15h	Concarneau / Puerto Calero (îles Canaries) / Rivière Sens (Guadeloupe)		
2001	30d 00h 23m	Fort Boyard-Puerto Calero-Salvador de Bahia		
2003	29d 13h 25m	Fort Boyard-Puerto Calero-Salvador de Bahia		
2005	24d 21h 36m	Fort Boyard-Puerto Calero-Salvador de Bahia		
2007	23d 03h 51m	Fort Boyard-Funchal-Salvador de Bahia		
2009	24d 23h 40m	Fort Boyard-Funchal-Salvador de Bahia		
2011	26d 03h 28m	Fort Boyard-Funchal-Salvador de Bahia		
2013	18d 13h 01m	(Douarnenez)-Sada Pointe-à-Pitre		
2015	19d 23h 19m	Douarnenez-Lanzarote-Pointe-à-Pitre		
2017	20d 20h 31m 57s	La Rochelle-Las Palmas-Le Marin via Cap-Vert		
2019	21d 21h 50m 55s	La Rochelle-Las Palmas de Gran Canaria-Le Marin		

== Winners and equipment ==
Winners and Equipment Used (Overall References)
Year	Category	Skipper	Boat name	Boat Design	Boat Designer	Total Time	Ref
1977	Overall	Daniel Gilard (FRA)	"Petit dauphin"		(Production)	38d 11h 10m	
1979	Overall	Norton Smith (USA)		"American Express"	(Proto)	32d 08h 10m	
1981	Overall	Jacques Peignon	"Iles du Ponant"		Berret (Proto)	32d 20h 22m	
1983	Overall	Stéphane Poughon	"Voiles Cudennec"		proto Lucas	31d 14h 45m	
1985	Overall	Yves Parlier (FRA)	"Aquitaine"		proto Berret	31d 14h 45m	
1987	Overall	Gilles Chiorri	"Exa"		proto Berret	30d 06h 41m	
1989	Overall	Philippe Vicariot	"Thom Pouss"		Jean-Marie Finot (Proto)	28d 07h 33m	
1991	Overall	Damien Grimont	"GTM Entrepose"		Jean-Marie Finot (Proto)	29d 04h 37m	
1993	Overall	Thierry Dubois (FRA)	"Amnesty International"		Rolland (Proto)		
1995	Overall	Yvan Bourgnon	"Omapi-St Brévin"		Jean-Marie Finot (Proto)	27d 07h 21m	
1997	Overall	Sébastien Magnen	"Karen Liquid"		proto Magnen	38d 11h	
1999	Overall	Sébastien Magnen	"Team Jeanneau-Voile Magazine"		Sébastien Magnen (Proto)	24d 15h	
2001	Proto	Yannick Bestaven (FRA)	Aquarelle.com		Magnen-Nivelt	30d 00h 23m	
2001	Series	Olivier Desport	My Workplace	Pogo-1			
2003	Proto	Armel Tripon (FRA)	Moulin Roty		Finot-Conq	29d 13h 25m	
2003	Series	Erwan Tymen	Navy Lest	Pogo-2			
2005	Proto	Corentin Douguet	E. Leclerc-Bouygues Telecom		Manuard	24d 21h 36m	
2005	Series	Peter Laureyssens	Wellments	Pogo-2			
2007	Proto	Yves Le Blevec (FRA)	Actual		Lombard	23d 03h 51m	
2007	Series	Hervé Piveteau (FRA)	Jules-Cartoffset	Pogo-2			
2009	Proto	Thomas Ruyant (FRA)	Faber France		Finot-Conq	24d 23h 40m	
2009	Series	Francisco Lobato	Roff TMN	Pogo-2			
2011	Proto	David Raison	Teamwork Evolution		Raison	26d 03h 28m	
2011	Series	Gwénolé Gahinet	Voiles Océan	Pogo-2			
2013	Proto	Benoît Marie	benoitmarie.com	AMCO	Group Finot	18d 13h 01m	
2013	Series	Aymeric Belloir	Tout Le Monde Chante Contre Le Cancer	Nacira		21d 09h 12m	
2015	Proto	Frédéric Denis (FRA)	Nautipark		Lombard	19d 23h 19m	
2015	Series	Ian Lipinski (FRA)	Entreprise(s) Innovante(s)	Ofcet 6.50	Bertrand	22d 09h 36m	
2017	Proto	Ian Lipinski (FRA)	Griffon.fr		Raison 2014	22d 23h 52m 46s	
2017	Series	Erwan Le Draoulec (FRA)	Émile Henry	Pogo-3		24d 19h 06m 30 s	
2019	Proto	François Jambou (FRA)	Team BFR Marée Haute Jaune		Raison 2014	20d 20h 31m 57s	
2019	Series	Ambrogio Beccaria (ITA)	Géomag	Pogo-3		21d 21h 50m 55s	
2021	Proto	Pierre Le Roy (FRA)	Teamwork			21d 02h 24m 08s	
2021	Series	Hugo Dhallenne (FRA)	YC Saint Lunaire			26d 02h 01m 03s	
2023	Proto	Federico Waksman (URY)	Repremar - Shipping Agency Uruguay			23d 04h 56m 39s	
2023	Series	Luca Rosetti (ITA)	Race=Care			25d 01h 04m 35s	
