= Mini Transat 6.50 =

Class of sailing yacht

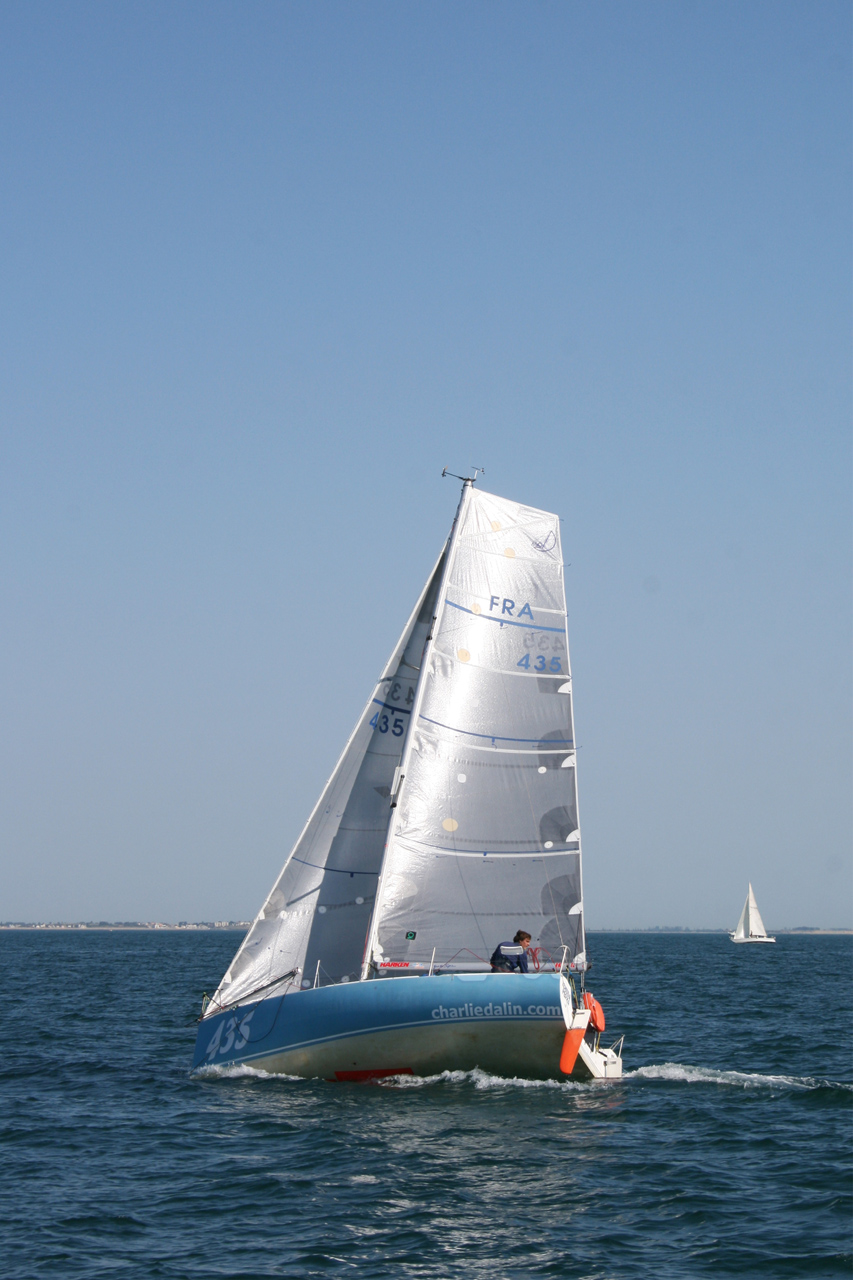

Development
- Designer: Various
- Year: 1976
- Builder: Various

Boat
- Crew: 1 or 2

Mini Transat 6.50 also known by a number of alternatives Mini, Class Mini, Transat 650 is a development measurement controlled offshore sailing primarily used for racing in the Mini Transat Race hence the name.

== Background ==
=== History ===
The Classe Mini conceiver around the Mini Transat race is run bi-annually and first took place in 1977. The race is a solo transatlantic yacht race. The class rules focus on this event and encourage development while controlling both costs and design and fitout safety requirements. The size of the boat allows for more experimentation in design without the costs of larger classes.

=== Class Association ===
The class association is an owner led organization that administers the rules and co-ordinates a series of single and double handed events for the class. In response to the perceived challenge of sailing small high-performance boats the class has created rigorous trials, equipment, and inspection requirements to add promote safety. The mini Transat class is largely French in its makeup but the class has tried to encourage international entries.

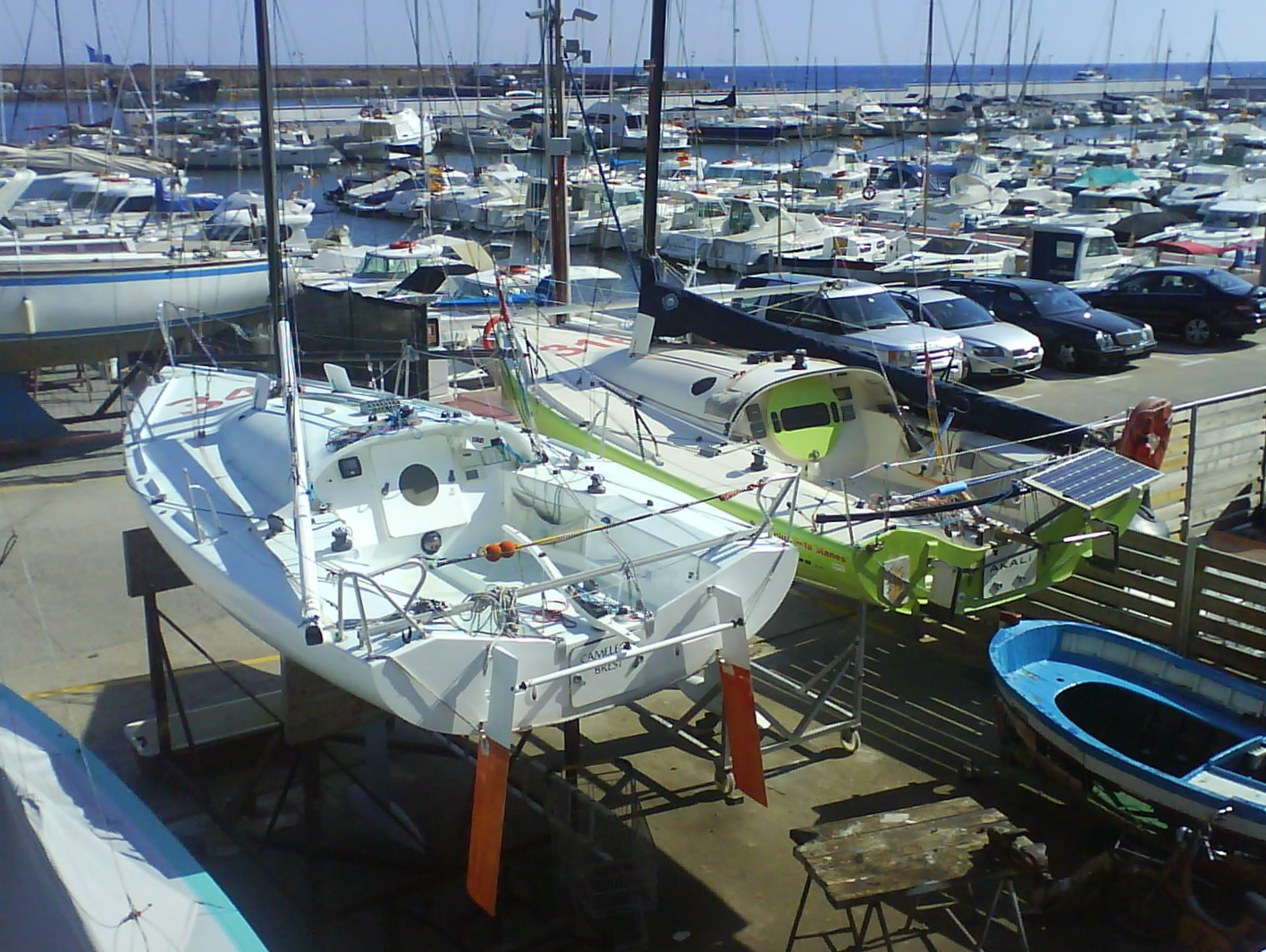
Note the width of the sterns

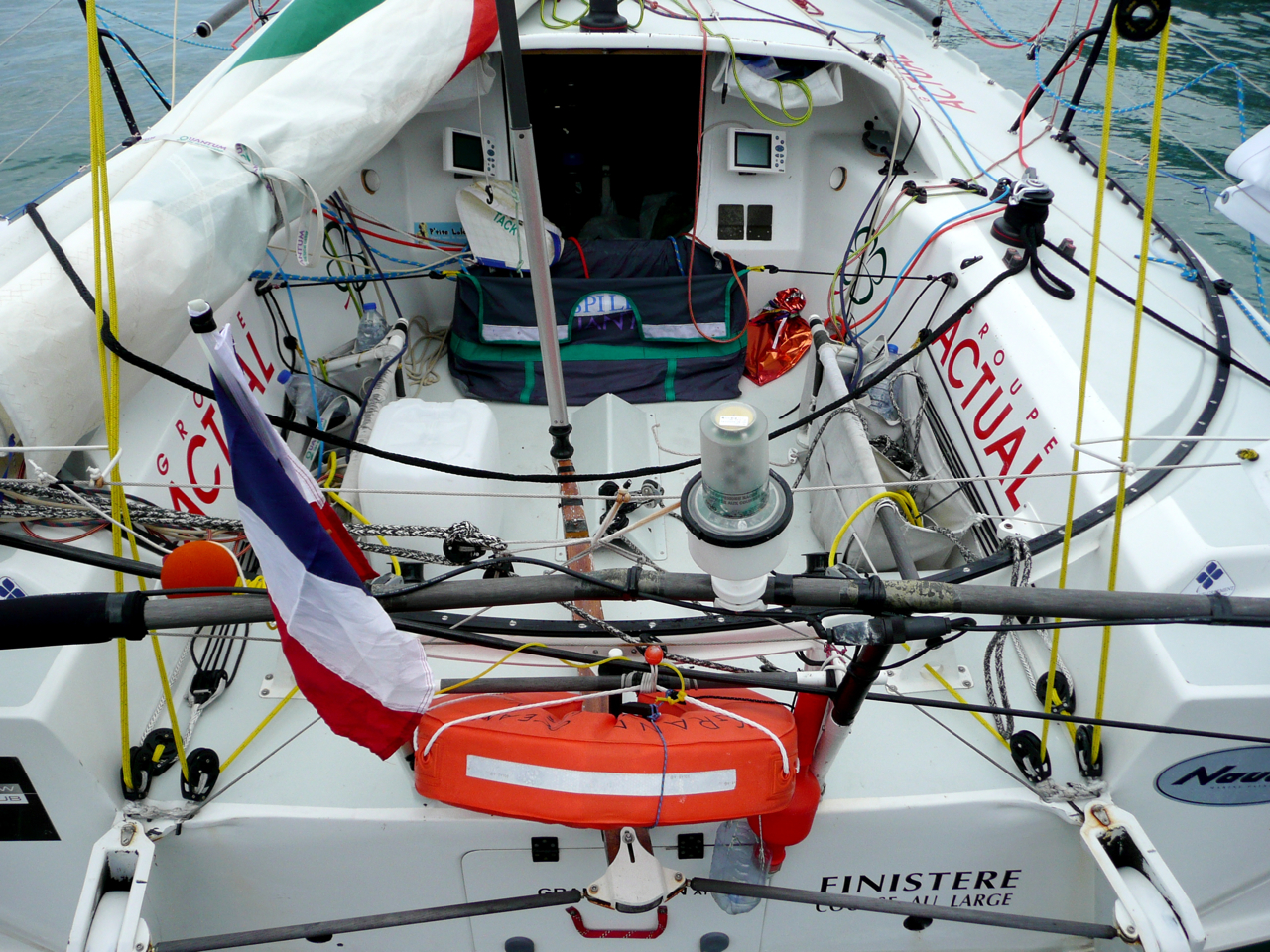
Typical cockpit

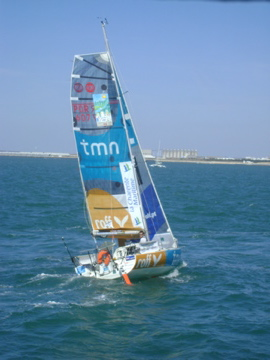
Pogo

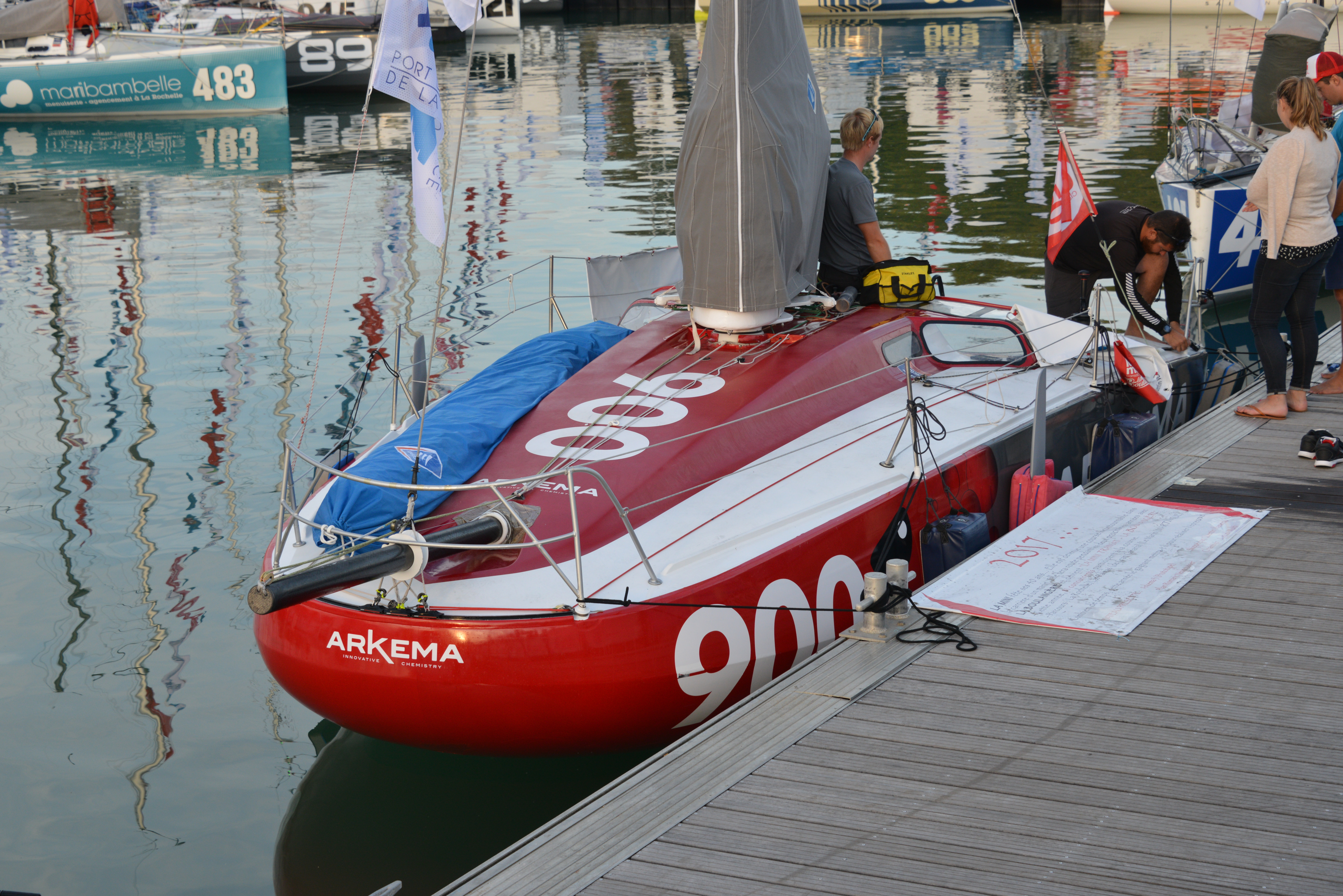
-

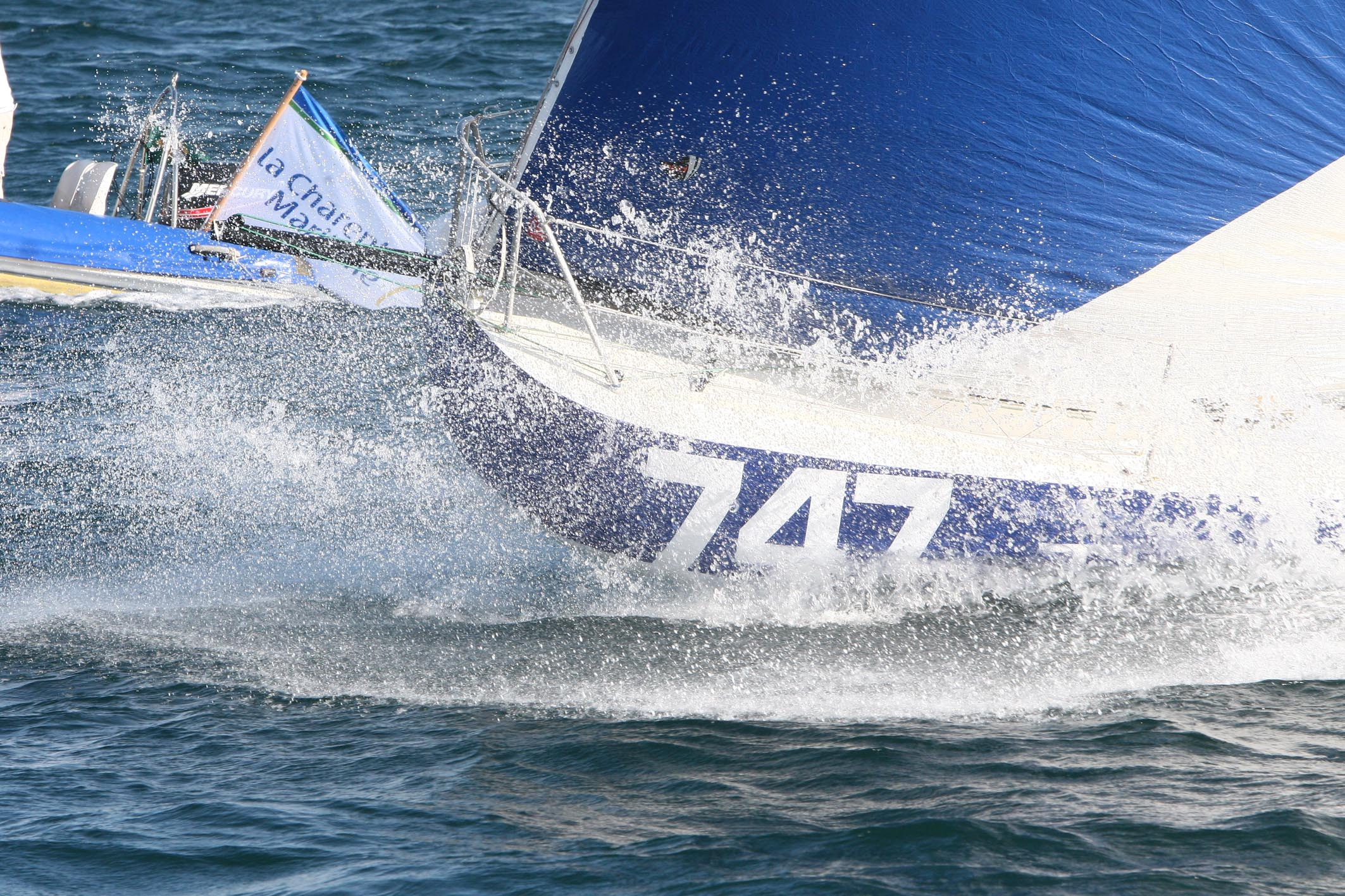
2011 Mini Transat Winner

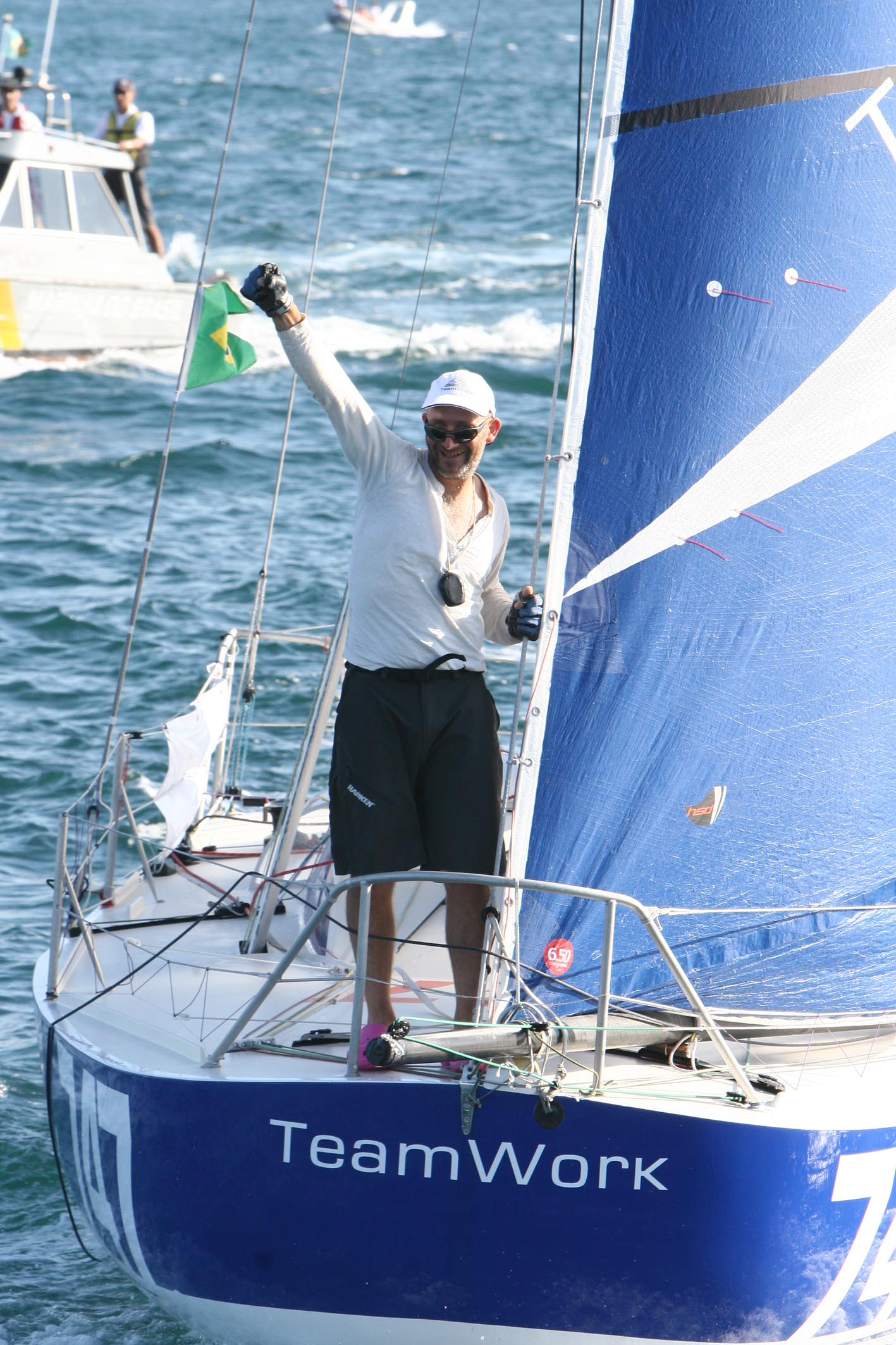
2011 Mini Transat Winner

== Development ==
=== Mini Transat Race Design Influence ===
Due to the downwind nature of the racing across the Atlantic Ocean designs tend to be beamy, being nearly half as wide as it is long. The wide flat stern is designed to promote planing similar to a surfboard. As a consequence of the wide beam twin rudders are pretty much standard so that one rudder remains in the water when heeled.

=== Canting Keels ===
The class led the way with canting keels – due to their small size there is a design requirement for them to be self-righting when capsized.

=== Scow Hull Form ===
The constraint of the box rule led to the introduction of the Scow hull form when David Raison's Mini used the hull shape to win 2011 victory, which may in fact, revolutionize open ocean racing if not sailing altogether. This design trend has now influenced the design of both the Class40 and IMOCA 60 class.

=== Foiling ===
The Magnum began an even more radical 'semi-flying' scow that uses a host of design tricks, including wings/foils and a telescopic canting keel, a retractable bowsprit and an Asymmetrical spinnaker, has been designed in France. This has led on to the launch of a fully foiling boats with a production foiling mini transat from pogo being launched in 2020.

== Division ==
There are two divisions:

=== Prototype ===
The prototype division is more liberal with respect to dimensions, such as keel depth and mast height, and it allows for advanced technology such as "canting" keels and carbon-fibre masts. The prototype class is approximately 7% faster.

=== Series (Production) ===
Production boats use approved designs and comparatively conservative materials.

Design	Builder	Builder Nat	Designer	Years	No. Built	Notes	Ref.
Coco	Archambault (Vienne)	France	Philippe Harlé	1985 - 2000s	105		
Super Calin 6.50	Magnan	France	Jean-Pierre Magnan	1997			
Naus	Disegno Contrario	France	Zancope	2000			
Mistral 6.50	AMC Marine	France	Joubert & Nivelt	2002			
Pogo 1	Pogo Structures (Finistère)	France	Pierre Rolland	1994-2002	125		
Pogo 2	Pogo Structures (Finistère) or California's Open Sailing (USA)	France	Jean-Marie Finot	2003			
Pogo 3	Pogo Structures (Finistère)	France	Guillaume Verdier	2014			
Pogo Foiler	Pogo Structures (Finistère)	France	Guillaume Verdier	2019 Onwards			
Dingo 1	Marée Haute (Finistère)	France	Pierre Rolland	2004			
Tip Top 650	Voiliers Bepox	France	Sam Manuard Yacht Design	2005			
Estarellas Zéro	Mos Composites	Spain	Marc Lombard				
Nacira 650	FR Boating	France	Alexis Muratet	2007-2012	18		
Azimut Ginto	Azimut	Italy	Sébastien Magnen	2007			
Dingo 2 (or D²)	Marée Haute (Finistère)	France	Pierre Rolland	2008			
RG 650	RioTecna	Argentina	G Yacht Design	2011			
Argo 650	Andrés Durán Yachting S.L	Spain	Marc Lombard	2012			
Ofcet 6.50	chantier ofcet (Charente-Maritime)	France	Etienne Bertrand	2014	17		
Maxi 6.50	IDB Marine (Finistère)	France	David Raison	2018 - Onwards			
Vector 6.5	Yacht Service Poland	Poland	Etienne Bertrand	2018 - Onwards		Scow	
