= Pogo Structures =

French sailboat manufacturer

- Company type: Privately held company
- Industry: Boat building
- Founded: 1987
- Headquarters: Combrit, France
- Key people: Christian Bouroullec
- Products: Sailboats
- Website: www.pogostructures.com

Pogo Structures is a French boat builder founded in Quimper by Christian Bouroullec in 1987. The company moved in 1990 to Combrit, specializes in the design and manufacture of racing and cruising sailboats. It launched its first motor boat in 2017.

As of 2020, the 80 people shipyard has produced 900 boats, with an average of 55 per year over the last few years.

== Construction ==
Pogo Structures uses, since 2004, the vacuum infusion process to build lightweight and stiff fiberglass sandwich boats. Starting 2007, the cruising range benefits from a lifting keel option.

== Cruising sailboats ==
Name	Designer	Years	LOA	No. Built	Notes
Pogo 50	Finot-Conq	2012-present	15.20 m (49.9 ft)		
Pogo 44	Finot-Conq	2020-present	13.55 m (44.5 ft)		
Pogo 12.50	Finot-Conq	2011-2022	12.50 m (41.0 ft)	82	
Pogo 40	Finot-Conq	2005-2009	12.18 m (40.0 ft)	45	
Pogo 36	Finot-Conq	2016-present	10.86 m (35.6 ft)		
Pogo 10.50	Finot-Conq	2008-2014	10.50 m (34.4 ft)	75	
Pogo 30	Finot-Conq	2013-present	9.14 m (30.0 ft)		
Pogo 8.50	Pierre Rolland	1999-2010	8.50 m (27.9 ft)	187	Voiles Magazine sailboat of the Year 2001

== Racing sailboats ==
Name	Designer	Years	LOA	No. Built	Notes
Pogo 40s4	Guillaume Verdier	2020-present	12.19 m (40.0 ft)		
Pogo 40s3	Finot-Conq	2014-2016	12.18 m (40.0 ft)		
Pogo 40s2	Finot-Conq	2009-2014	12.18 m (40.0 ft)		
Pogo foiler	Guillaume Verdier	2018-present	6.50 m (21.3 ft)		
Pogo 3	Guillaume Verdier	2015-present	6.50 m (21.3 ft)		
Pogo 2	Finot-Conq	2003-2009	6.50 m (21.3 ft)	111	
Pogo	Pierre Roland	1994-2002	6.50 m (21.3 ft)	124	

== Motor boats ==
Name	Designer	Years	LOA	No. Built	Notes
Loxo 32	Pogo Structures	2017-present	9.50 m (31.2 ft)		
Loxo 32 outboard	Pogo Structures	2020-present	9.50 m (31.2 ft)		
Loxo 32 electric	Pogo Structures	2020-present	9.50 m (31.2 ft)		

== See also ==
- List of sailboat designers and manufacturers
