= Class40 =

International racing sailing class

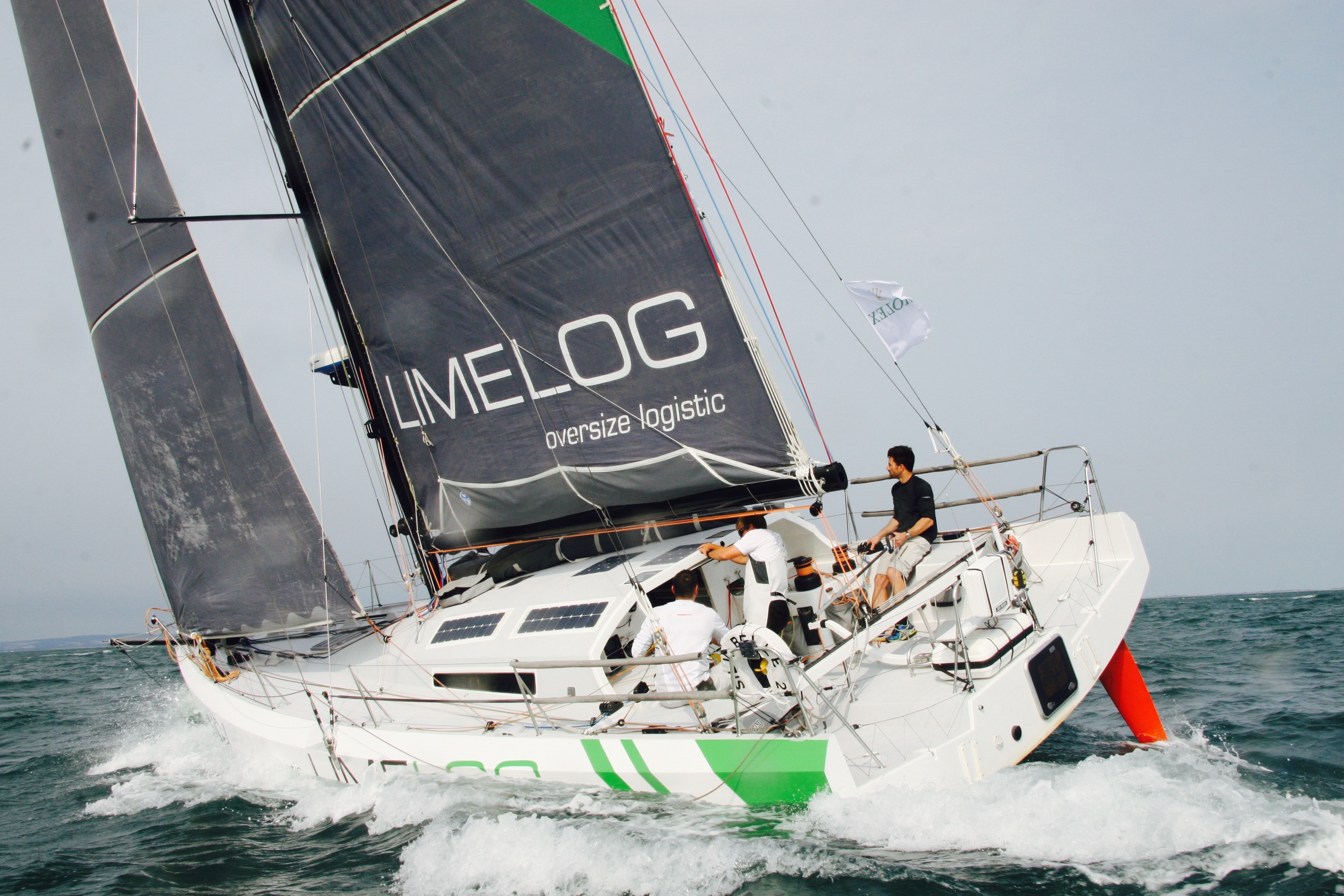

Development
- Designer: Various
- Year: 2004
- No. built: 190+

Boat
- Crew: typically 1 or 2
- Displacement: ≥ 4,580 kg (10,100 lb)
- Draft: ≤ 3.00 m (9.84 ft)

Hull
- Type: monohull
- LOH: ≤ 12.19 m (40.0 ft)
- Beam: ≤ 4.50 m (14.8 ft)

Hull appendages
- General: single fixed keel, two movable appendages (daggerboards and hydrofoils are forbidden).
- Ballast: 750 L of water ballast per side

Sails
- General: ≤ 8 sails in total
- Upwind sail area: ≤ 115 m^{2} (1,240 sq ft)

Class40 is a class of monohull sailboat and a yacht primarily used for short handed offshore and coastal racing. The class is administered by International Class40 Association which is recognised by the World Sailing.

== Background ==
In 2004, former Vendée Globe and Whitbread competitor Patrice Carpentier brought together designers, builders and sailors to develop a class of short-handed offshore racing boats.[1] More than 160 boats have since been built. Class40 is distinct from Open 40, an earlier class that influenced its development.

The "Class40" can be designed by anyone provided the boat fits within the measurement rule defined. This rule takes the form of a box rule.

The association is responsible for defining and updating the class rules for the boats, and has the additional aims of co-ordinating events.

Class 40 monohulls outnumbered all other boat classes during their first appearance in the 2006 Route du Rhum, with 25 boats registered.

The Class 40 monohulls are high-performance racing boats, designed principally for single-handed or small crew offshore competition.

Class 40 monohulls sit in size between boats the small offshore classes of the Classe Mini and Beneteau Figaro 3 and the pinnacle class the IMOCA 60.

Single and double-handed sailing represents a rapidly growing sector of the sport of sailing. The Class 40 is a cheaper boat that can be sailed competitively in a range of conditions either short handed, by two people, or a solo sailor.

The class is active in Europe and growing in North America. Boats are built on a semi-production or custom basis. The class rules work to keep the boat affordable, limiting exotic materials and equipment seen in high end offshore boats such as the IMOCA 60.

Though some boats are sailed by pro sailors, the amateur class continues to grow as sailors look for the next challenge in offshore sailing.

== Events ==
=== Class Starts - Oceanic Races ===
- Route du Rhum Solo Transatlantic Race starting in France
- Transat Jacques Vabre Two Person Transatlantic Race starting in France
- Globe 40 Race Two Person Stopping Round the World Race

=== World Championships ===
Event	Gold	Silver	Bronze
2009 Hamble	Concise Sailing Team; Ned Collier Wakefield (GBR)	Clarke Offshore Racing; Simon Clarke (GBR)	Desafio Cabo De Hornos; Felipe Cubillos (CHI)
2010 Gijon	FRA 65 - Tales Sailing Team; Gonzalo Botin (ESP)	FRA 83 - Mistral Loisirs – Pole Santé Elior; Thierry Bouchard (FRA)	GBR 93 - Concise Sailing Team; Ned Collier Wakefield (GBR)
2011 - Bénodet	104 JACK IN THE BOX LE CLAQUIN Aloys (FRA); Remi AUBRUN (FRA); Ludovic ENSARGUEIX (FRA); Camille Lecointre (FRA); Gideon KRIGER (FRA); Samuel MANUARD (FRA)	65 TALES ESPAGNE Gonzalo BOTIN (ESP); Inigo ORTIZ (ESP); Antonio PIRIS (ESP); Francisco RIVERO (ESP); Pablo SANTURDE (ESP); Manuel CARRION (ESP); Alesandro PELLA (ESP)	83 COMIRIS - ELIOR SANTE BOUCHARD Thierry (FRA); GANDON Olivier (FRA); MILANESE Michel (FRA); BERENGER Gilles (FRA); KRAUSS Oliver (FRA); VASSELLIER Pascal (FRA)
2012 - La ROCHELAISES	ESP 65 TALES	FRA 104 JACK IN THE BOX	GER 115 MARE

=== Other Events with Class Starts ===
- Atlantic Cup Charleston-New York-Newport May Bi-Annually
- Rolex Fastnet Race

=== Other Events ===
The class has had numerous success in most of the prestigious offshore events.

RORC Caribbean 600 includes a varied fleet of IRC Offshore boats, Class40s and Multihulls.

== The records ==
These records are usually calculated by race directions but not endorsed by the World Sailing Speed Record Council.

=== 24 Hours Distance ===
Date	Distance (milles)	Speed (knots)	Skipper(s)	boat	launch	crew	race
2024 April 15	433.53	18.06	Alberto Riva, Jean Marre & Benjamin Schwartz	Acrobatica	2024	3	Niji 40

=== Non-Stop Round Britain and Ireland ===
Class 40 - Non-Stop Round Britain and Ireland Records
Finish Date	Time	Boat Type	Boat	Skipper(s)	Crew	Notes	Ref.
Singlehanded
2020-07-09	7d 17h 50m 47s	Class40	Crédit Mutuel	Ian Lipinski (POL)	N/A		
2004-06	11d 12h 26m 48s	Open 40	"Roaring Forty"	Michel Kleinjans (BEL)	N/A		
Crewed Record
2020	7d 06h 27m 25s	Class40	'Banque de Leman'	Simon Koster (SUI)	Justine Mettraux (SUI) and Valentin Gautier (SUI)		
2020-07-09	7d 17h 50m 47s	Class40	Crédit Mutuel	Ian Lipinski (FRA)	None		
2018-08-20	8d 4h 14m 49s	Class40	"Imerys Clean Energy"	Phil Sharp (GBR)	+crew	set during RORC Race	
2014-08-20	8d 19h 06m 49s	Class40	'Swish'	Roderick Knowles (GBR)	+2 other crew	set during RORC Race	
2010	9d 13h 32m 20s	Class40	Concise 2	Ned Collier Wakefield (GBR)	+5 other crew	set during RORC Race	
