= 1996–1997 Vendée Globe =

Event title
- Name: 1996–1997 Vendée Globe
- Edition: 3rd Edition
- Sponsor: Vendee Region of France

Event details
- Start location: Les Sables-d'Olonne
- Finish location: Les Sables-d'Olonne
- Course: Solo non-stop round-the-world race
- Start date: 3 November 1996
- Finish date: 3 November 1996
- Yachts: IMOCA 50; IMOCA 60

Results
- (gold) Gold: Christophe Auguin (FRA); Geodis
- (silver) Silver: Marc Thiercelin (FRA); Crédit Immobilier
- (bronze) Bronze: Hervé Laurent (FRA); Groupe LG-Traitmat

The 1996–1997 Vendée Globe was a non-stop round-the-world yacht race for IMOCA 50- and IMOCA 60-class yachts crewed by only one person. It was the third edition of the race, starting on 3 November 1996 from Les Sables-d'Olonne. The overall winner was Christophe Auguin who crossed the finish line on 17 February 1997 after a total time of 105 days, 20 hours and 31 minutes.

== Summary ==
Another heavy-weather start in the Bay of Biscay knocked Nándor Fa and Didier Munduteguy out of the race early, and several others returned to the start for repairs before continuing. The rest of the fleet raced to the Southern Ocean, where a second attrition began: Yves Parlier and Isabelle Autissier broke rudders, leaving Christophe Auguin to lead the way into the south.

The race was won by Christophe Auguin. Catherine Chabaud, in sixth place, was the last to cross the finish line and the first woman to complete a solo navigation of the globe without stopping. Ten of the sixteen boats that started the race did not finish.

The book Godforsaken Sea by Derek Lundy profiles the 1996–1997 running of the race.

== Incidents ==
=== Gerry Roufs ===
The yacht Groupe LG 2 and its Canadian sailor Gerry Roufs were lost in the Southern Ocean; his body was never found, but his boat was found five months later off the Chilean Coast.

=== Retirement causes ===
Heavy weather took a serious toll on the sailors in the far Southern Ocean.

Unofficial competitor Raphaël Dinelli's boat capsized, and he was rescued by Pete Goss. Then, within a few hours of each other, two other boats capsized, with both rescues undertaken by the Royal Australian Navy.

Pete Goss was later awarded the Légion d'honneur for his rescue of Dinelli. The capsize of several boats in this race prompted tightening up of the safety rules for entrants, particularly regarding boat safety and stability.

== Results ==
Table: Order of Finish, 1996–1997 Vendée Globe

| Pos | Sailor | Yacht | Time | Ref. |
|---|---|---|---|---|
| 1 | Christophe Auguin (FRA) | Geodis | 105d 20h 31' (new record) | |
| 2 | Marc Thiercelin (FRA) | Crédit Immobilier | 113d 08h 26' | |
| 3 | Hervé Laurent (FRA) | Groupe LG-Traitmat | 114d 16h 43' | |
| 4 | Éric Dumont (FRA) | Café Legal-Le Goût | 116d 16h 43' | |
| 5 | Pete Goss (GBR) | Aqua Quorum | 126d 21h 25' | IMOCA 50 |
| 6 | Catherine Chabaud (FRA) | Whirlpool-Europe 2(H) | 140d 04h 38' | |
Did not finish
| DNF | Isabelle Autissier (FRA) | PRB (1) | broken rudder | |
| DNF | Yves Parlier (FRA) | Aquitaine Innovations | broken rudder | |
| DNF | Bertrand de Broc (FRA) | Votre Nom autour du Monde: Pommes Rhône Alpes | capsized | |
| DNF | Tony Bullimore (GBR) | Exide Challenger | capsized | |
| DNF | Thierry Dubois (FRA) | Amnesty International | capsized | |
| DNF | Nándor Fa (HUN) | Budapest | collision | |
| DNF | Didier Munduteguy (FRA) | Club 60è Sud | dismasted | |
| DNF | Patrick de Radiguès (BEL) | Afibel | beached | |
| DNF | Gerry Roufs (CAN) | Groupe LG 2 | Boat and skipper lost at sea | |
Unofficial Starter
| N/A | Raphaël Dinelli (FRA) | Algimouss | capsized Unofficial Starter | |

== Gallery ==
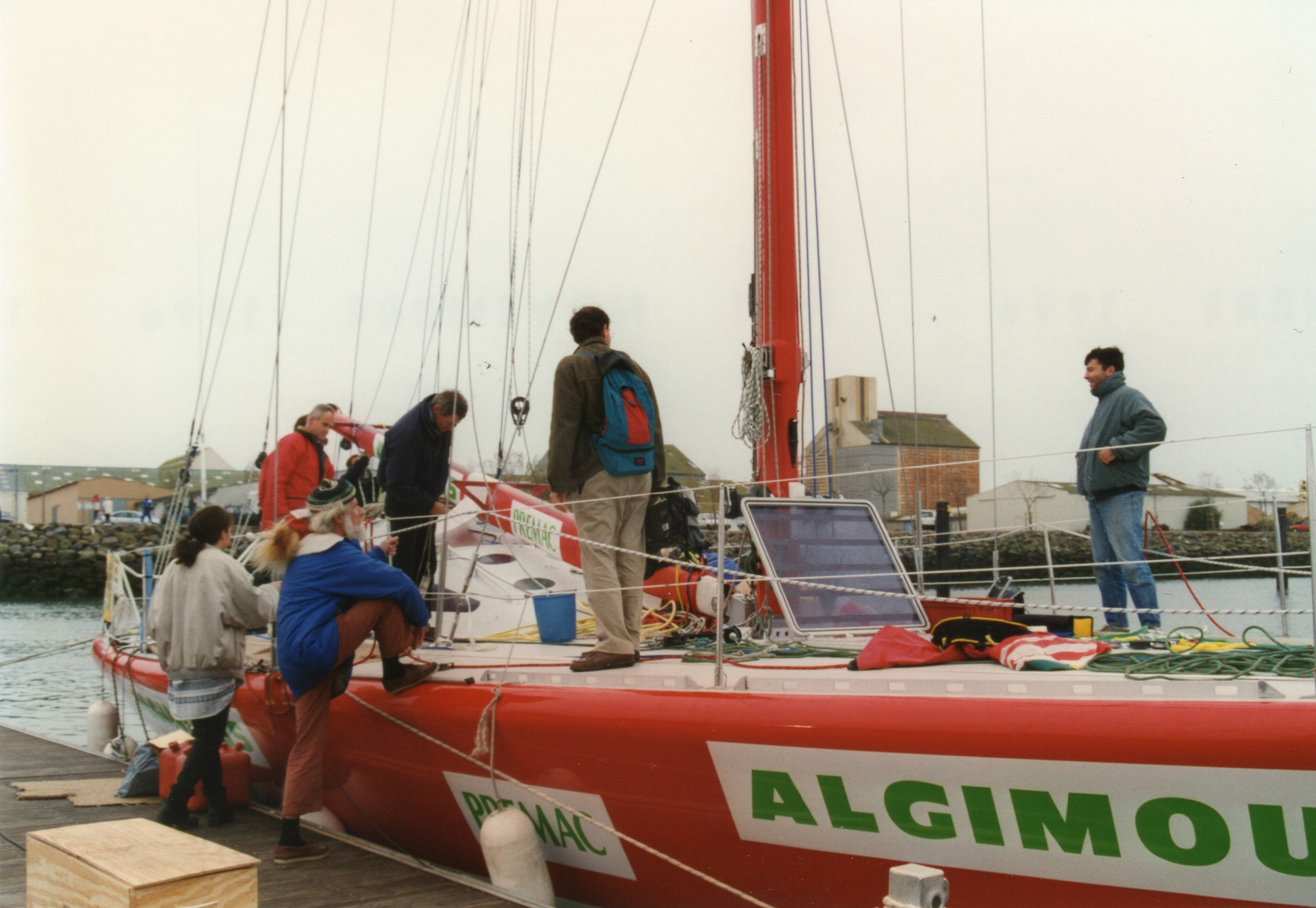

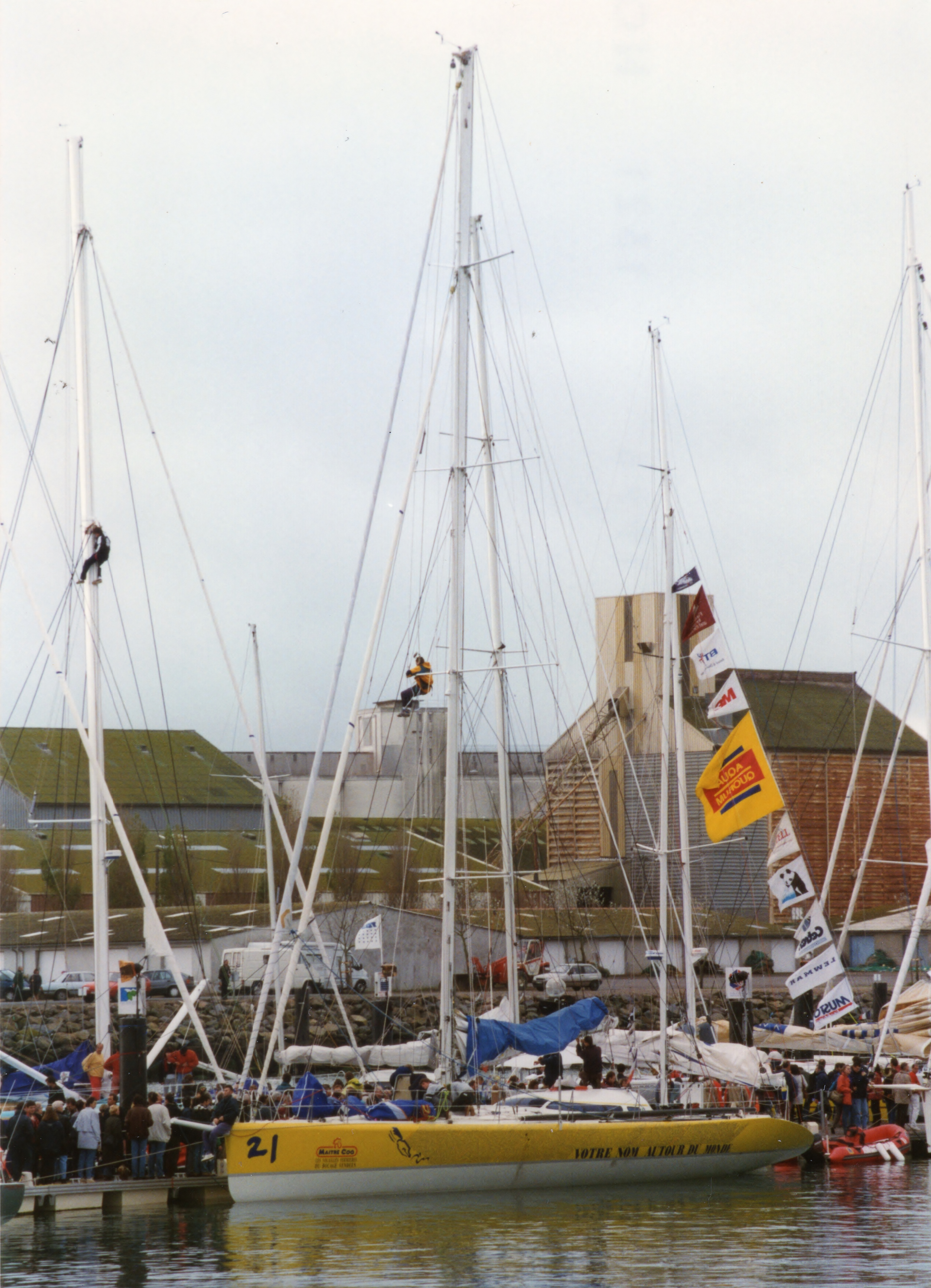

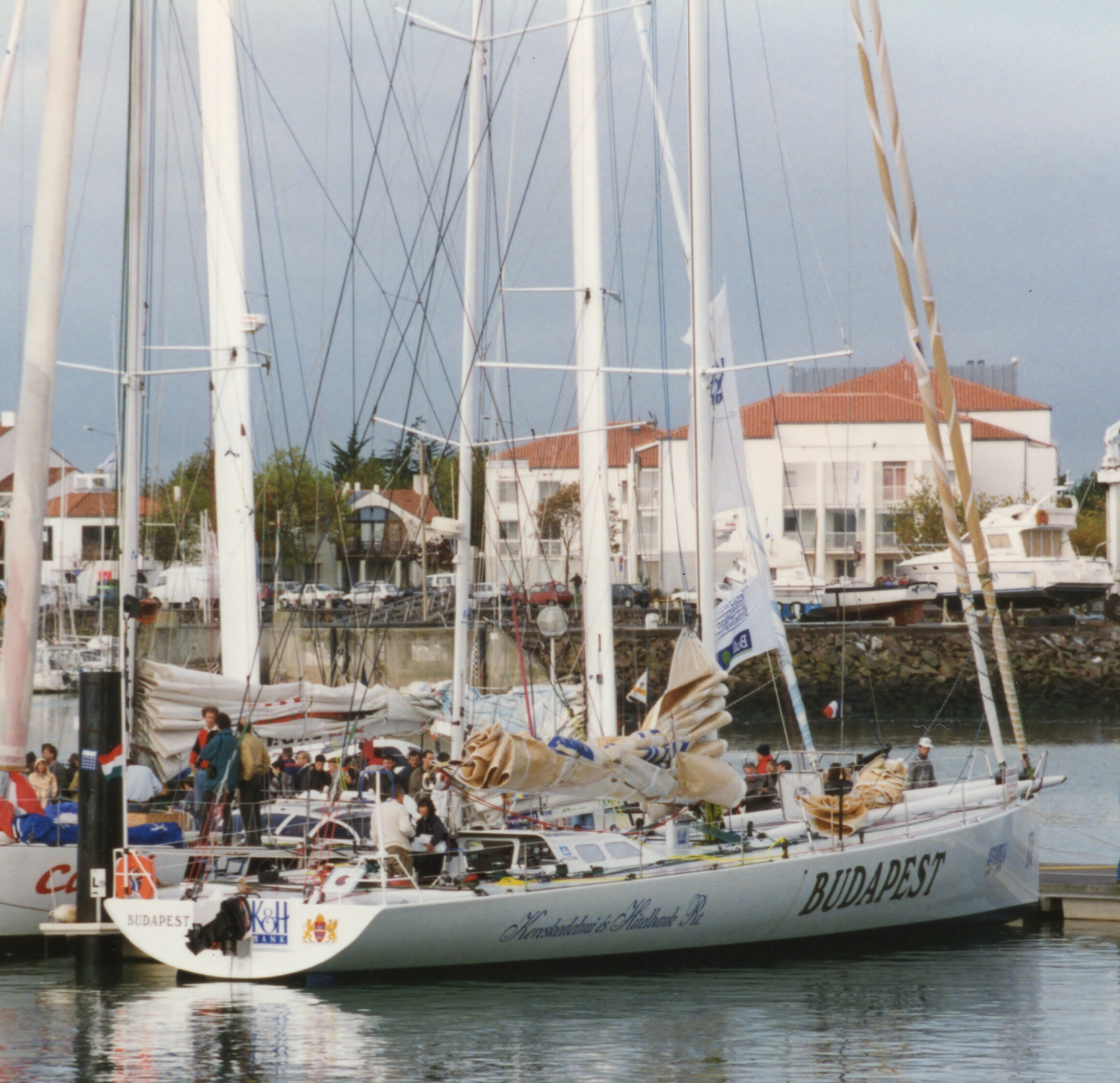

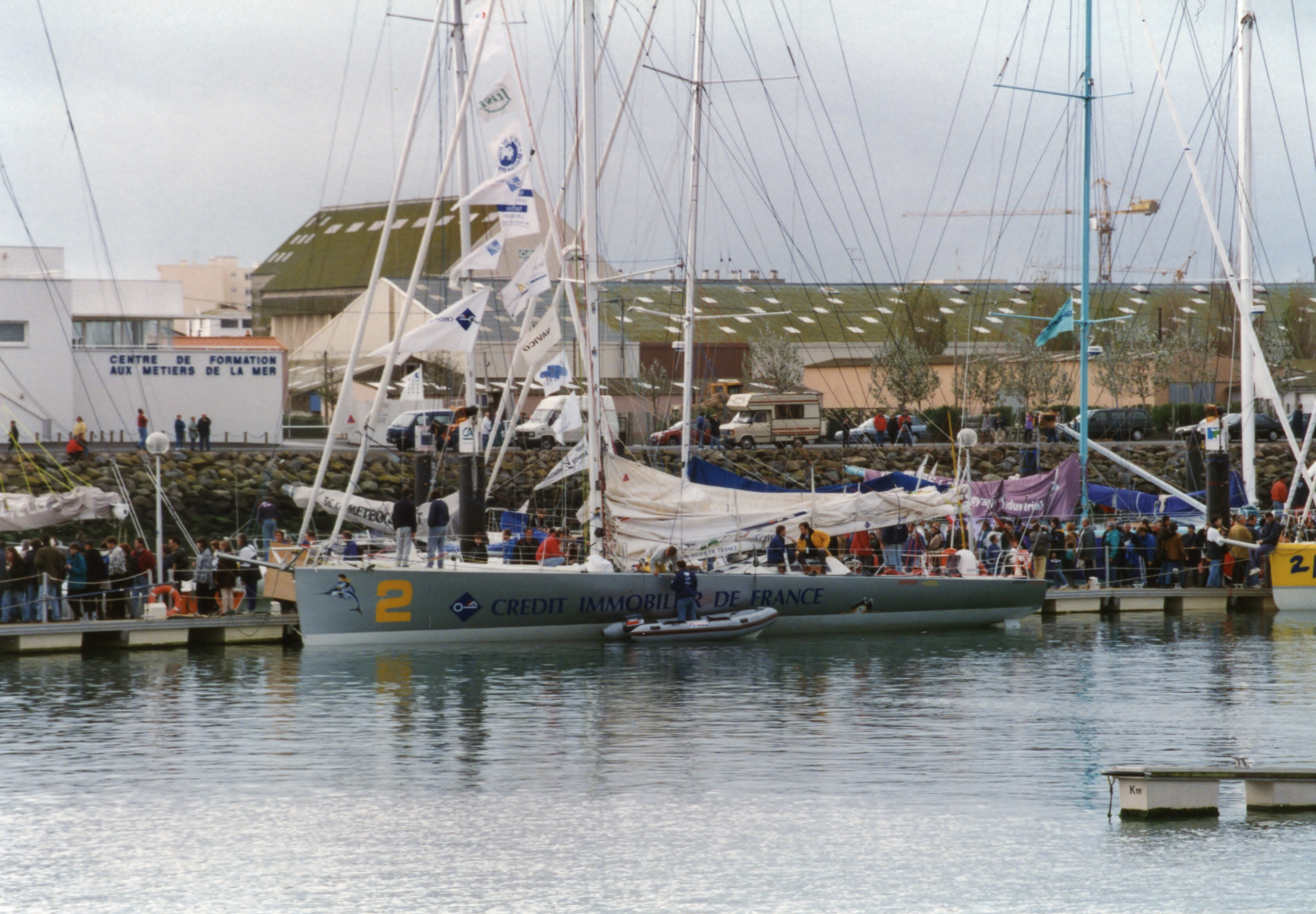

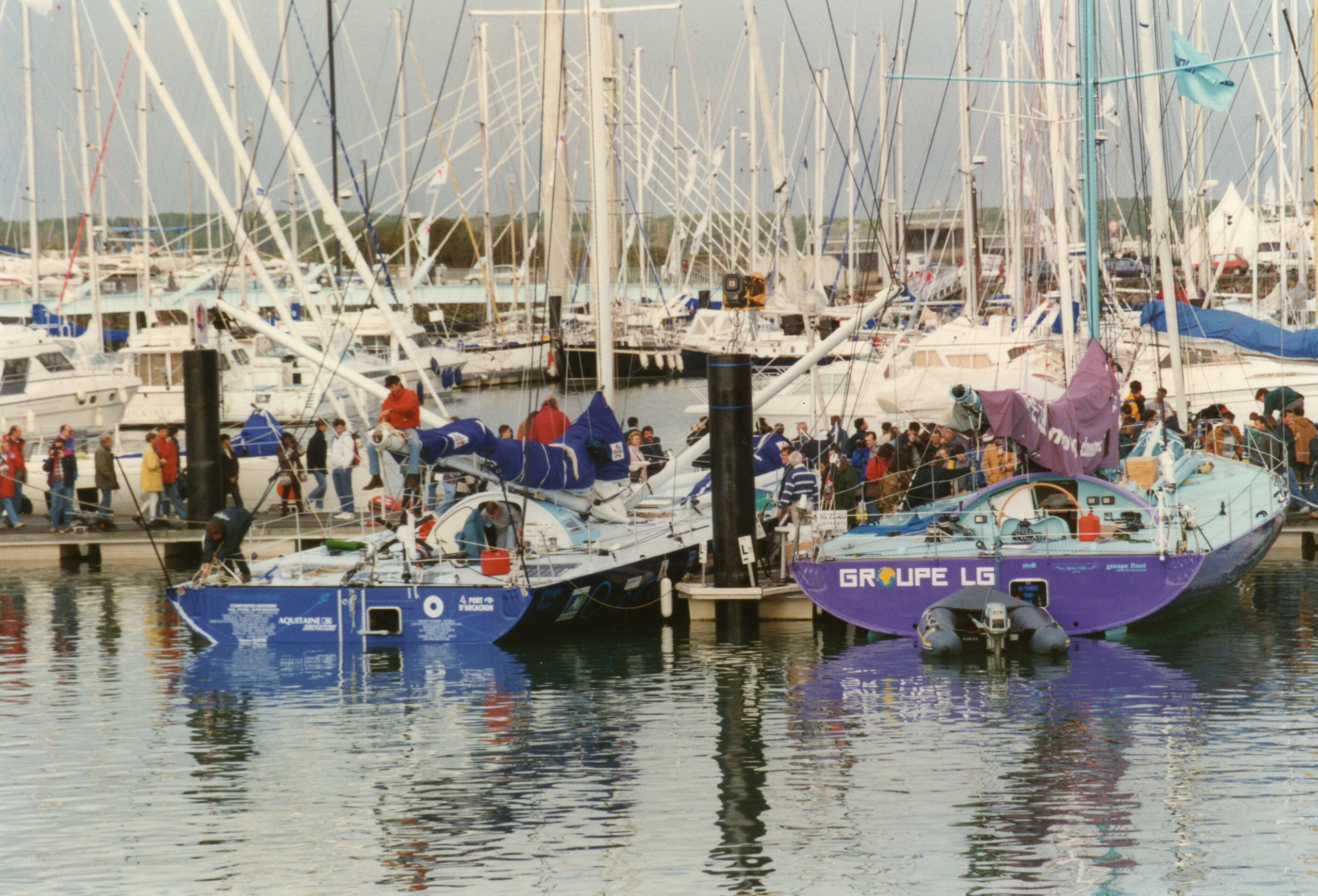

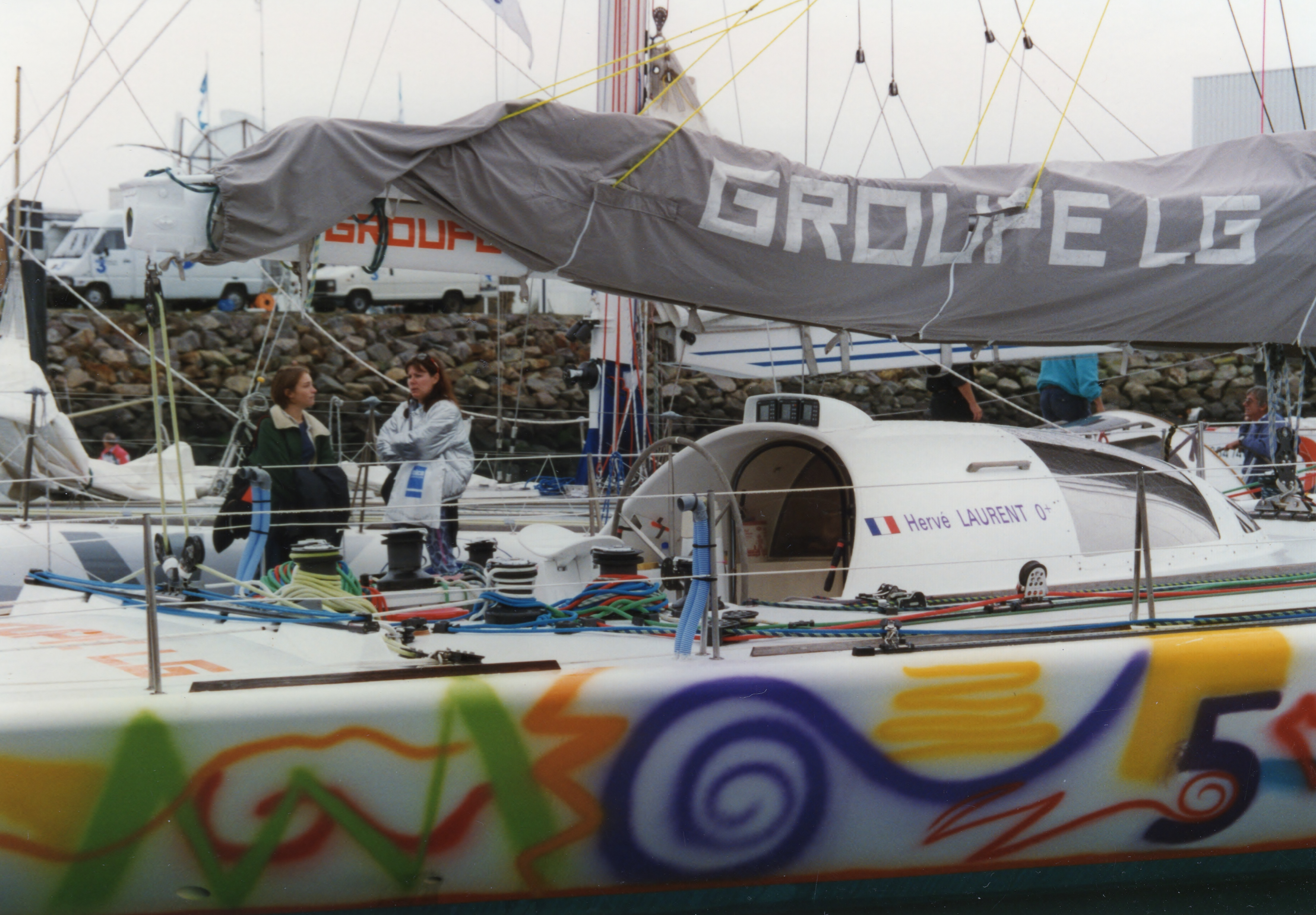

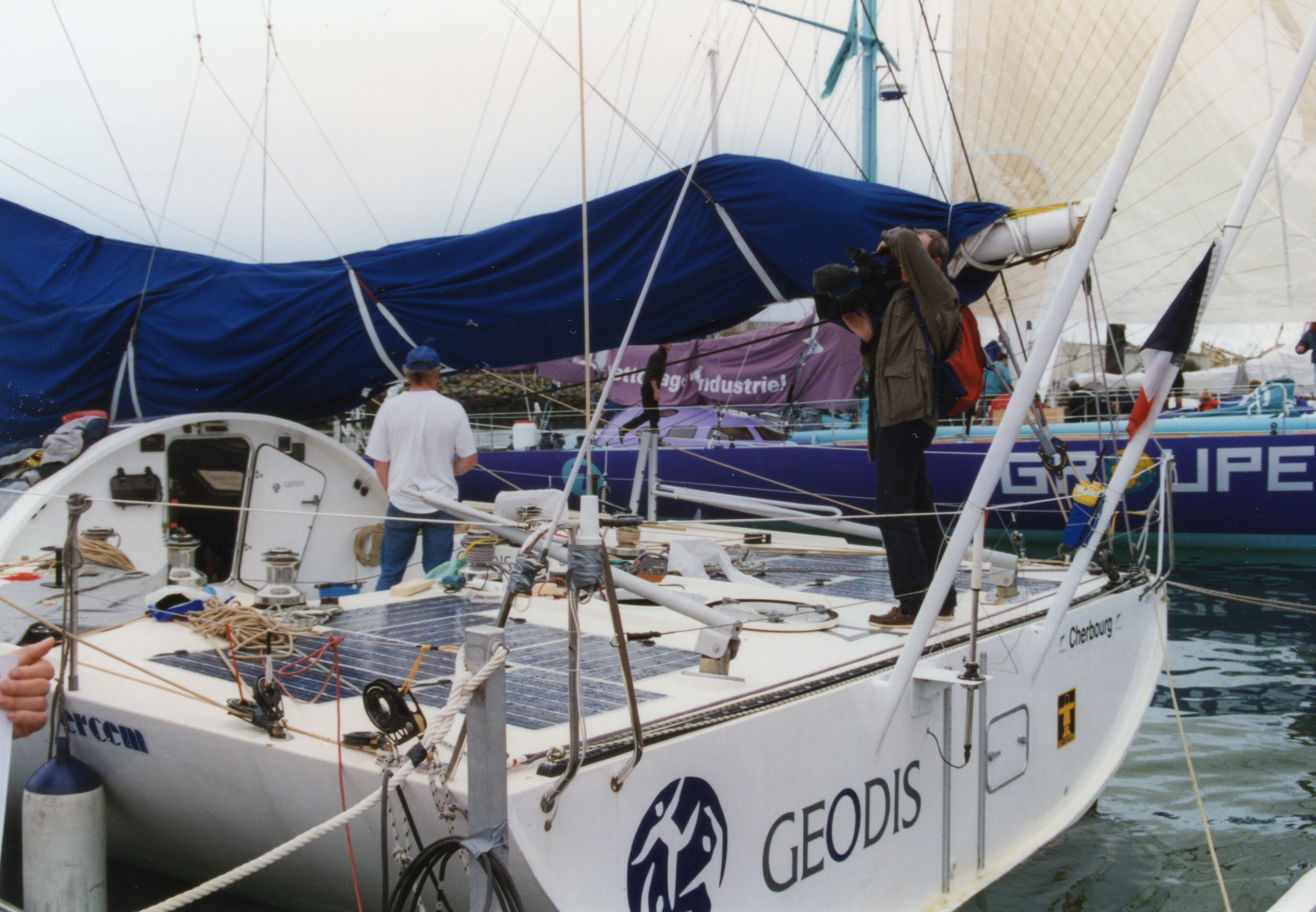

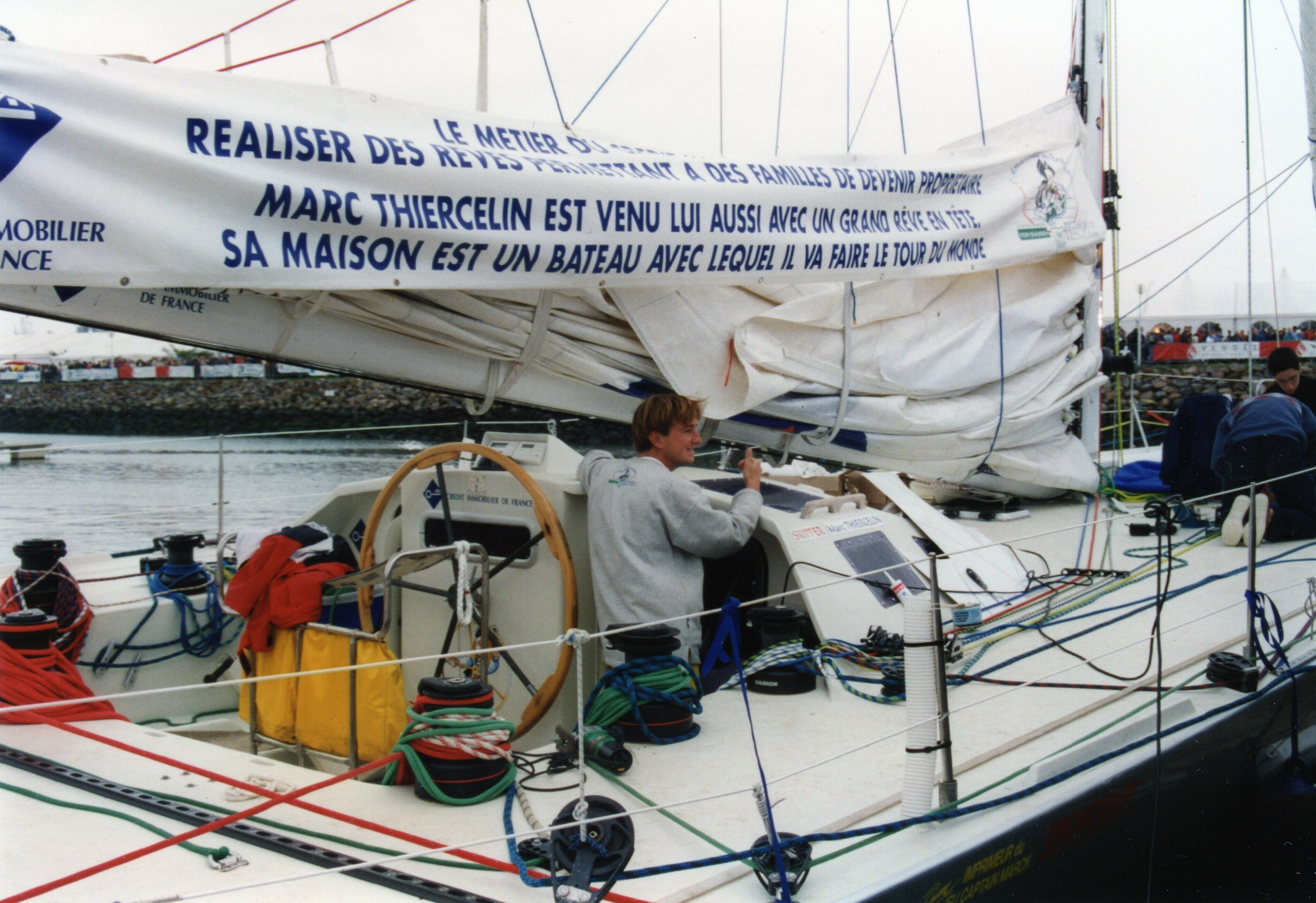

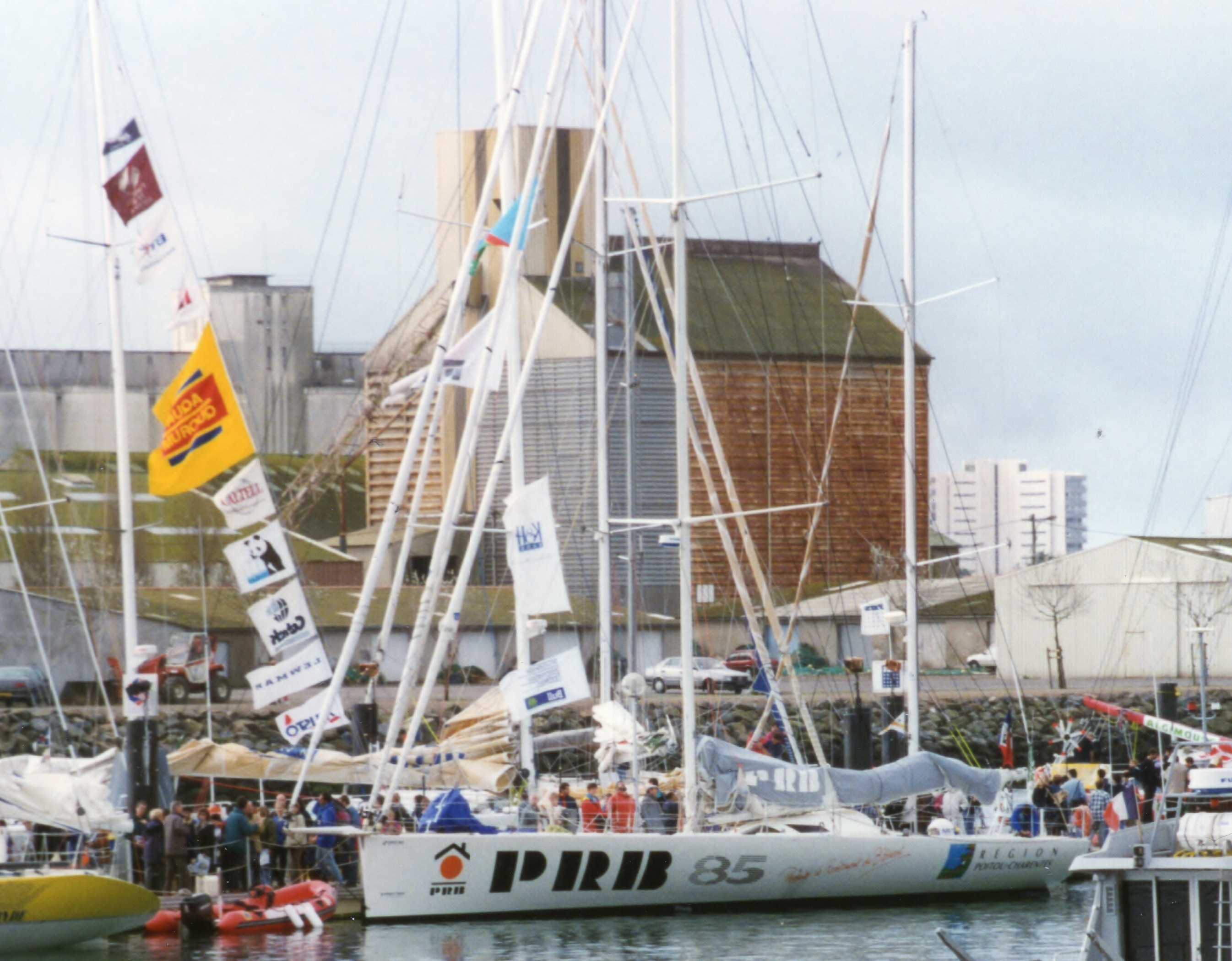

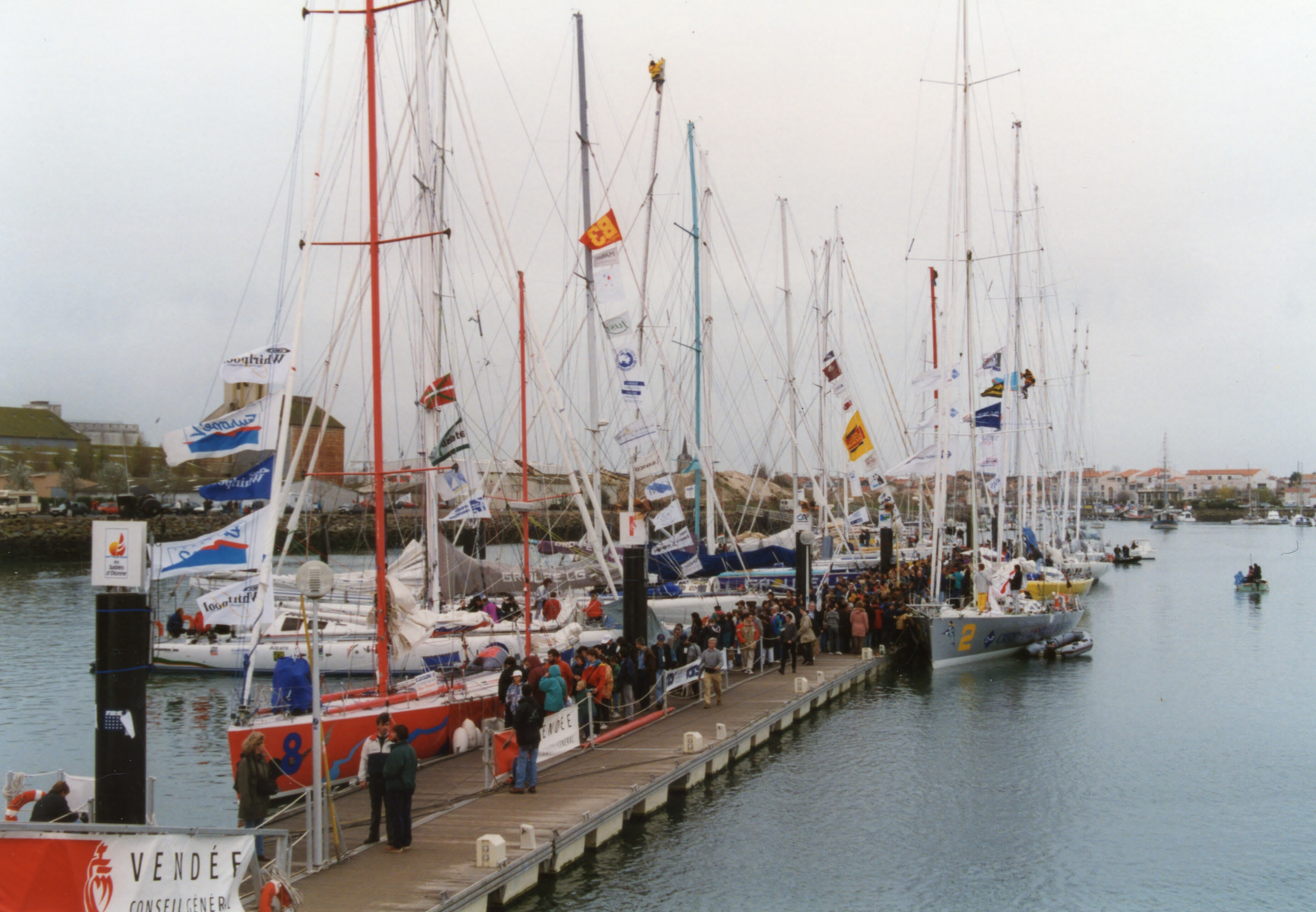

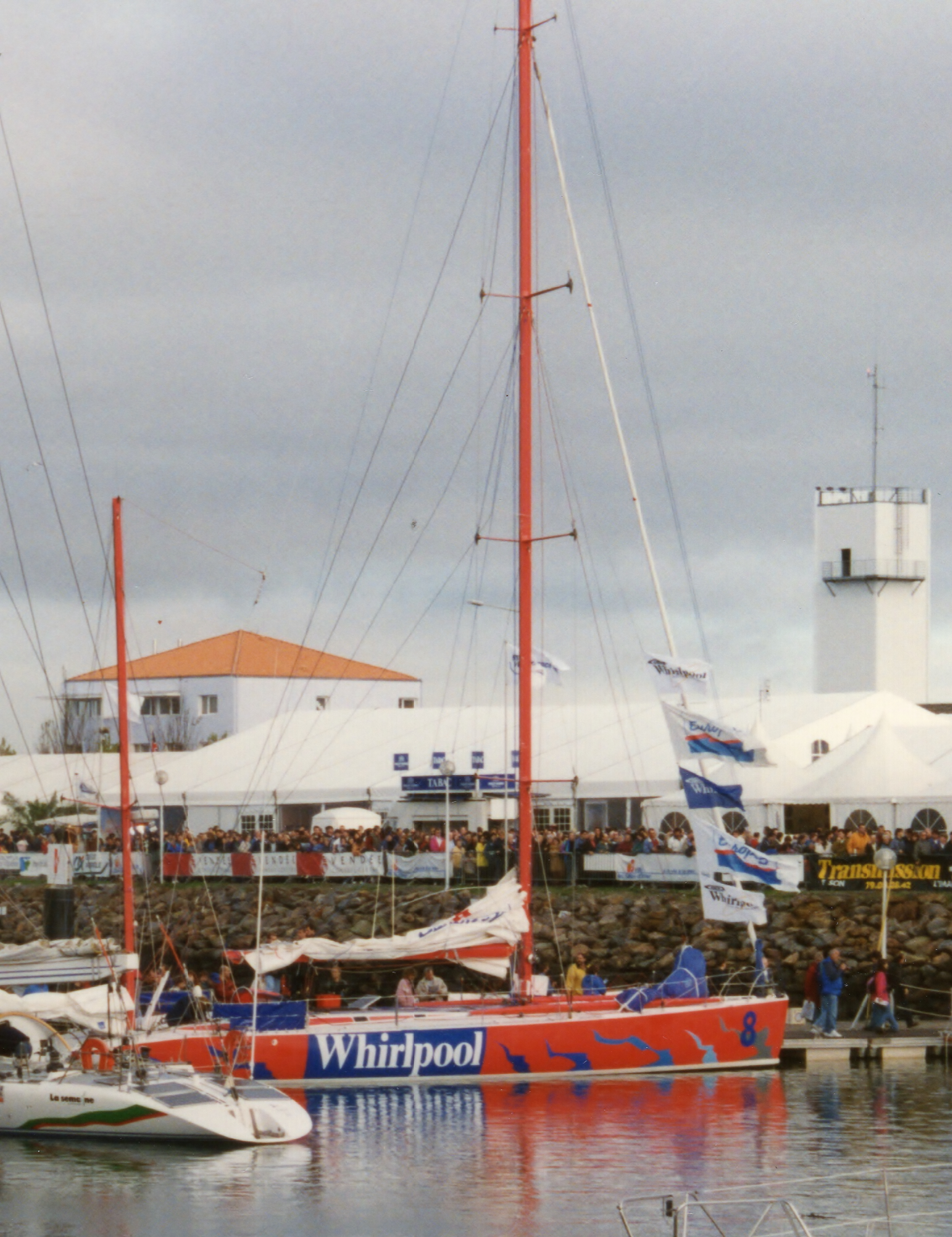

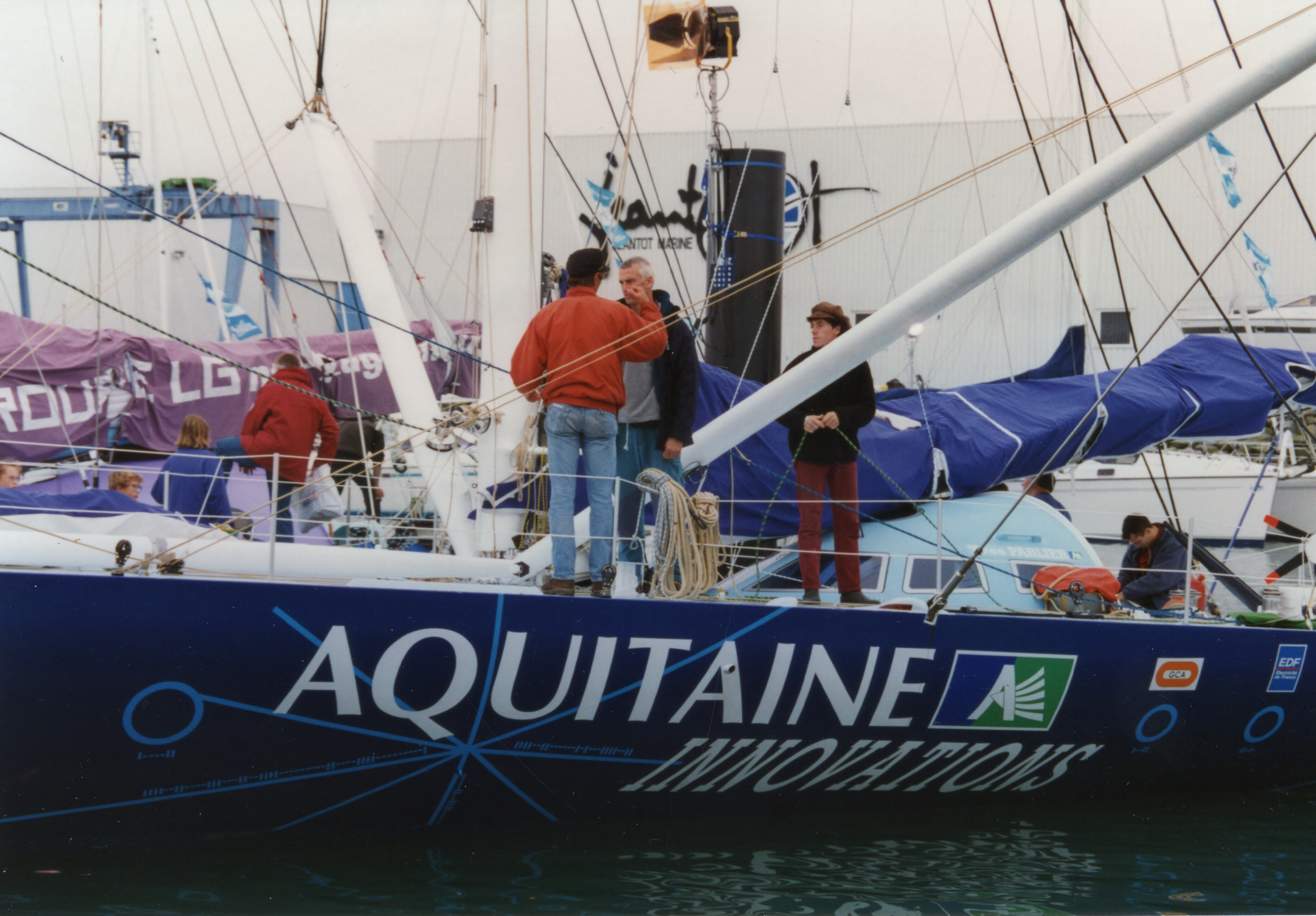

== Competitors ==
=== Entries gallery ===
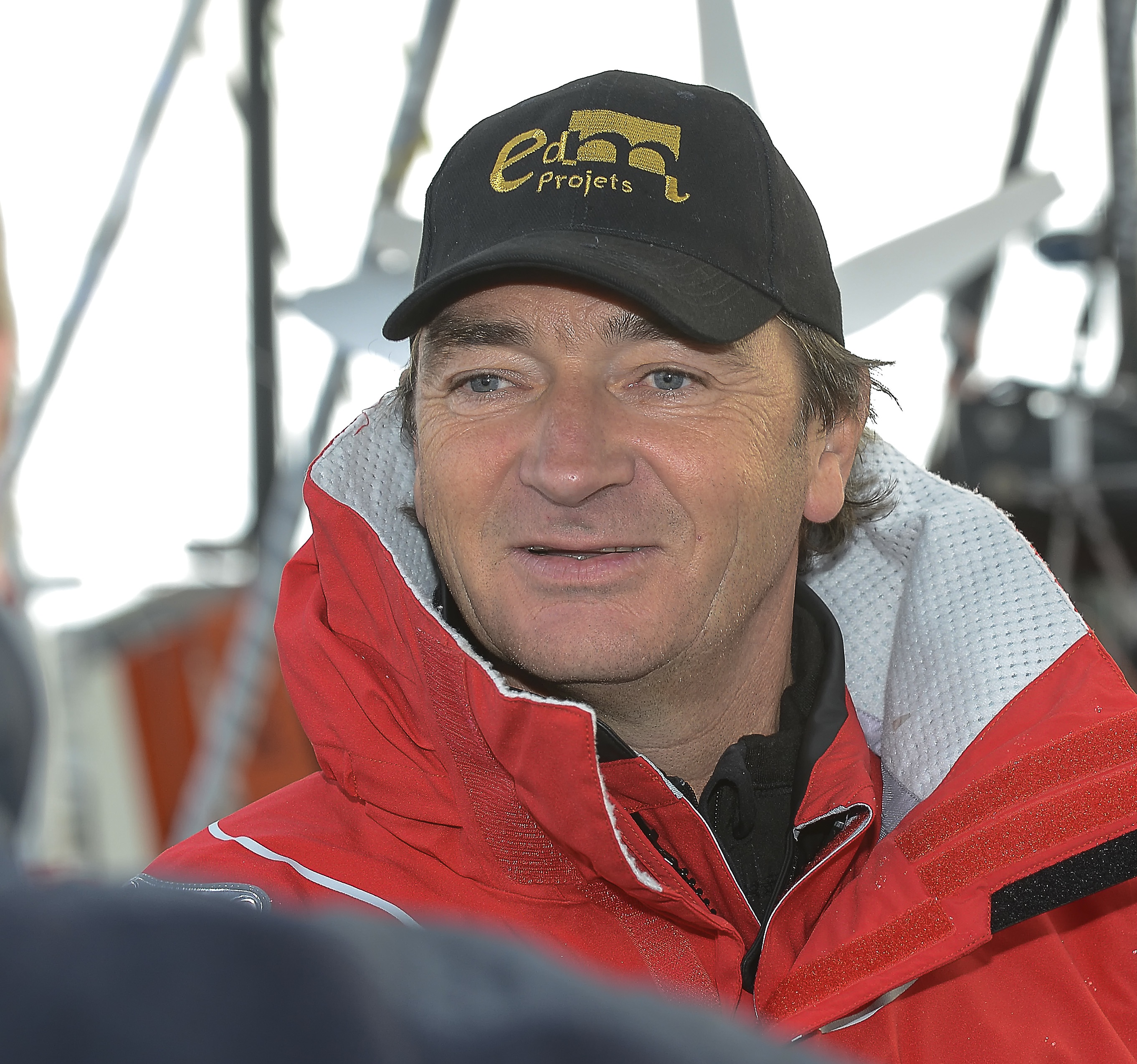
Bertrand de Broc (FRA)
Votre Nom autour du Monde
- Pommes Rhône Alpes

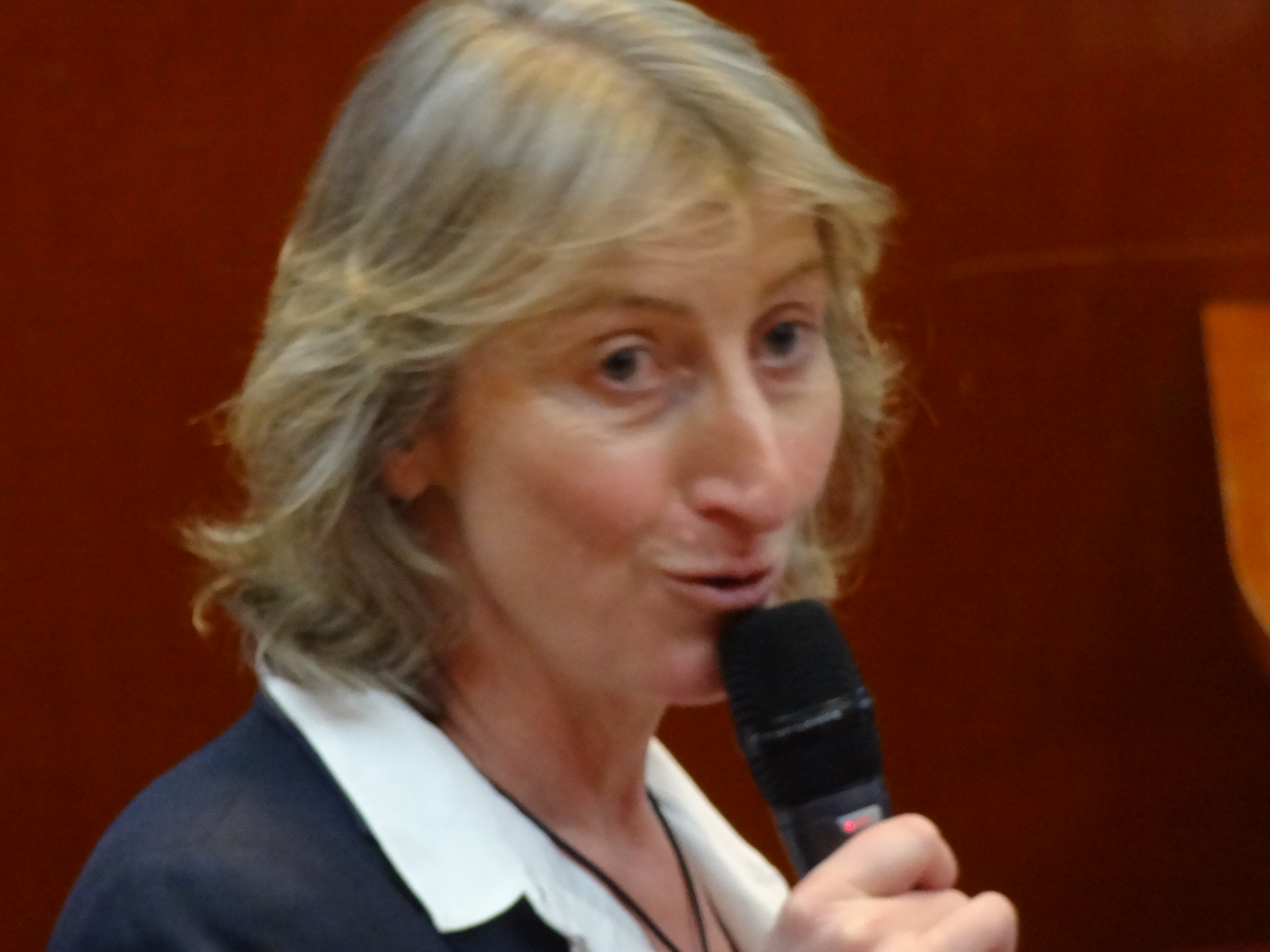
Catherine Chabaud (FRA)
Whirlpool-Europe 2

Christophe Auguin (FRA)
Geodis

Didier Munduteguy (FRA)
Club 60è Sud

Éric Dumont (FRA)
Café Legal-Le Goût

Gerry Roufs (CAN)
Groupe LG 2

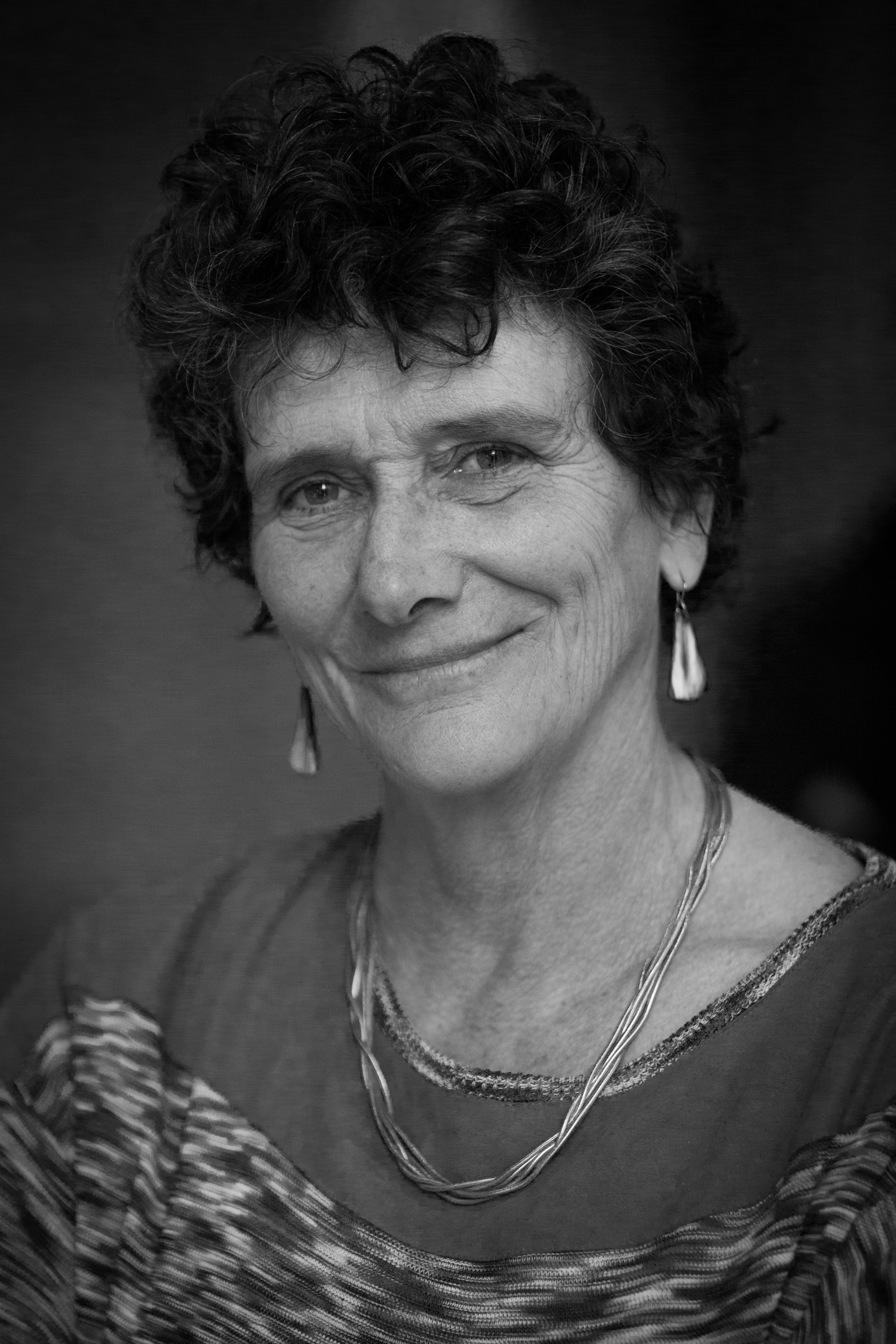
Isabelle Autissier (FRA)
PRB (1)

Hervé Laurent (FRA)
Groupe LG-Traitmat

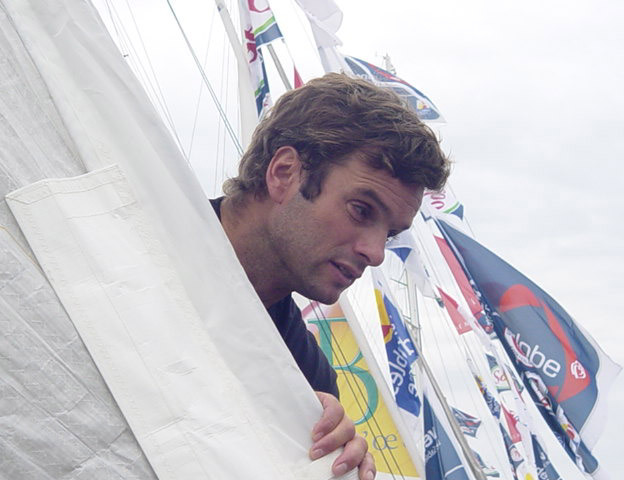
Marc Thiercelin (FRA)
Crédit Immobilier

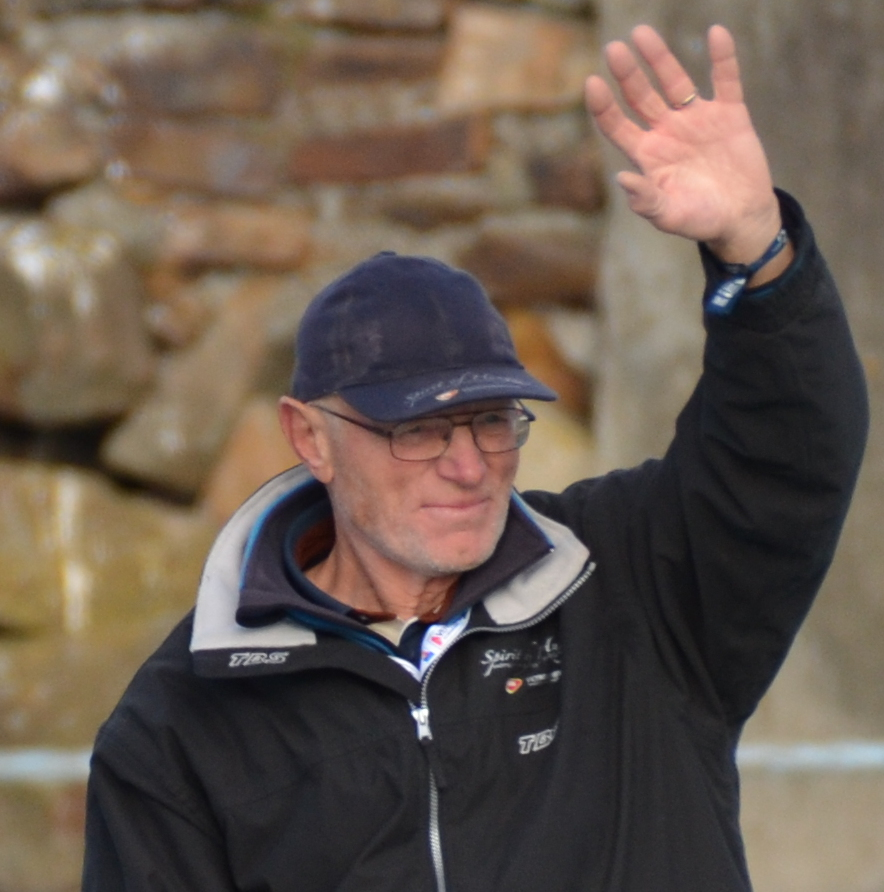
Nándor Fa (HUN)
Budapest

Patrick de Radiguès (BEL)
Afibel

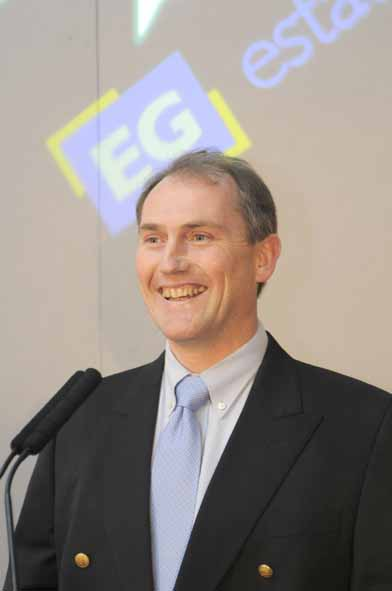
Pete Goss (GBR)
Aqua Quorum

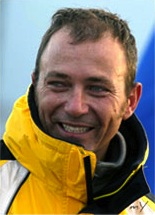
Raphaël Dinelli (FRA)
Algimouss

Tony Bullimore (GBR)
Exide Challenger

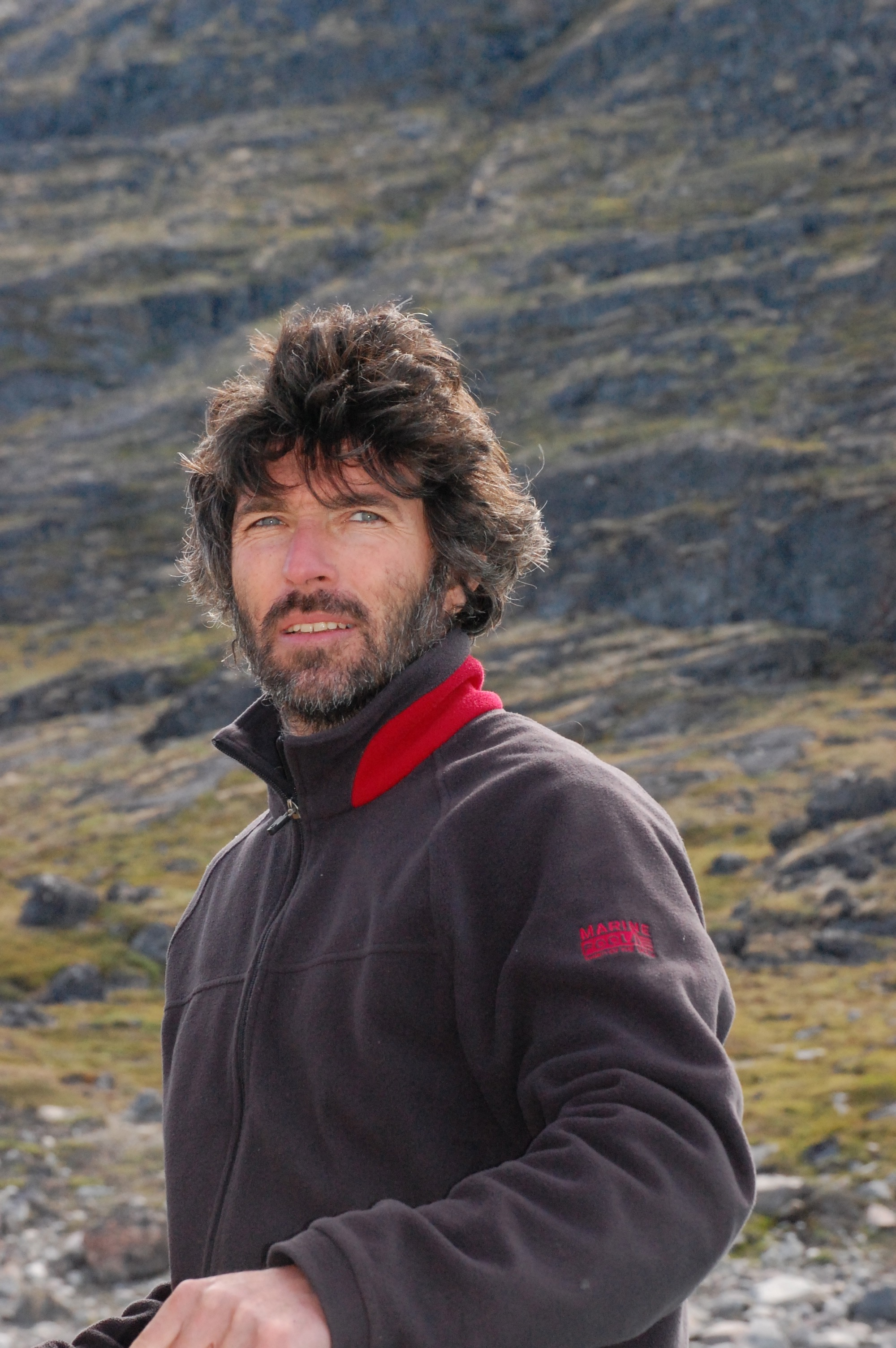
Thierry Dubois (FRA)
Amnesty International

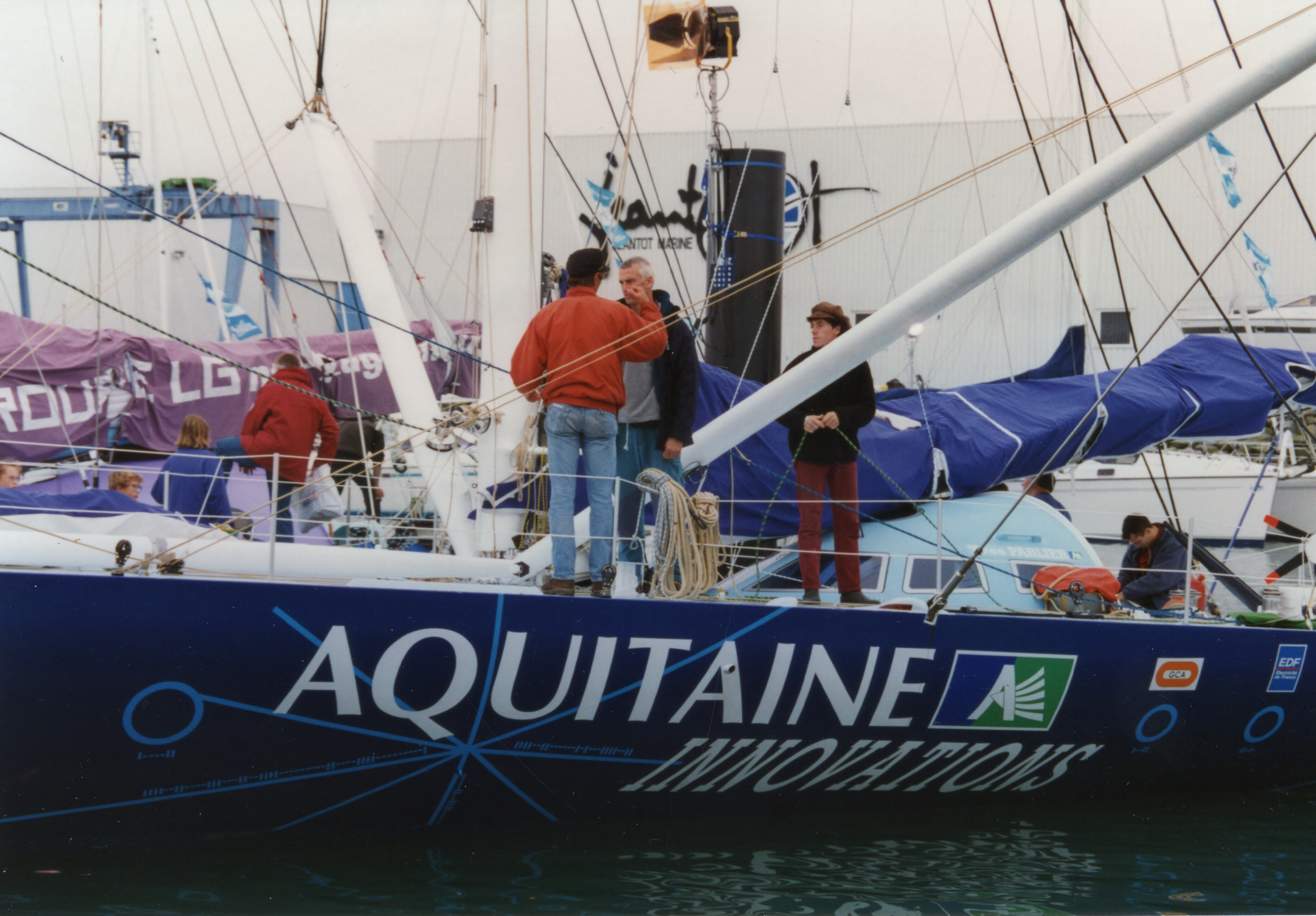
Yves Parlier (FRA)
Aquitaine Innovations

=== Entries boats ===
Fifteen skippers started the race a qualification passage was required to validate the registration of each boat, this course could have been carried out as part of another sailing race.

List of participants and equipment used
| Skipper | Nat. | Prev. participation (Start/Finish) | Name of boat | Sail no. | Naval architect | Builder | Launch date | Ref. |
|---|---|---|---|---|---|---|---|---|
| Bertrand de Broc | France | 1 / 0 | Votre Nom autour du Monde: Pommes Rhône Alpes | | Philippe Briand | ATA Jeanneau | 1989 | |
| Catherine Chabaud | France | Never | Whirlpool-Europe 2 | | Philippe Harlé; Alain Mortain | CDK Technologies | 1991 | |
| Christophe Auguin | France | Never | Geodis | | Finot-Conq | JMV Industries | 1994 | |
| Didier Munduteguy | France | Never | Club 60 Sud | | Philip Morrison | Rowsell & Morrison (GBR) | 1990 | |
| Éric Dumont | France | Never | Café Legal-Le Goût | | Finot-Conq | CDK Technologies | 1992 | |
| Gerry Roufs | Canada | Never | Groupe LG 2 | | Finot-Conq | Mag et JMV | 1995 | |
| Hervé Laurent | France | Never | Groupe LG-Traitmat | | Luc Bouvet; Olivier Petit | Chantier Capitaine Flint | 1989 | |
| Isabelle Autissier | France | Never | PRB (1) | | Finot-Conq | Marc Pinta | 1996 | |
| Marc Thiercelin | France | Never | Crédit Immobilier de France | | Finot-Conq | Marc Pinta | 1990 | |
| Nándor Fa | Hungary | 1 / 1 (5th) | Budapest | | Nándor Fa | Fa Hajo Kft | 1996 | |
| Patrick de Radiguès | Belgium | Never | Afibel | | Philippe Harlé; Alain Mortain | Garcia | 1989 | |
| Pete Goss | United Kingdom | Never | Aqua Quorum | | Adrian Thompson | Pete Goss – Plymouth GBR | 1996 | IMOCA 50 |
| Tony Bullimore | United Kingdom | Never | Exide Challenger | | Noble et Smith | Wesley Massam | 1992 | |
| Thierry Dubois | France | Never | Pour Amnesty International | | Joubert-Nivelt | chantier Hervé et Pinta | 1989 | |
| Yves Parlier | France | 1 / 1 (4th) | Aquitaine Innovations | | Finot-Conq | Composite Aquitaine; Thierry Eluère | 1996 | |
| Raphaël Dinelli | France | Never | Algimouss | | Marc Lombard | Jeantot Marine | 1998 | |
