= IMOCA 60 Sceta Calberson =

Round the World Racing Yacht

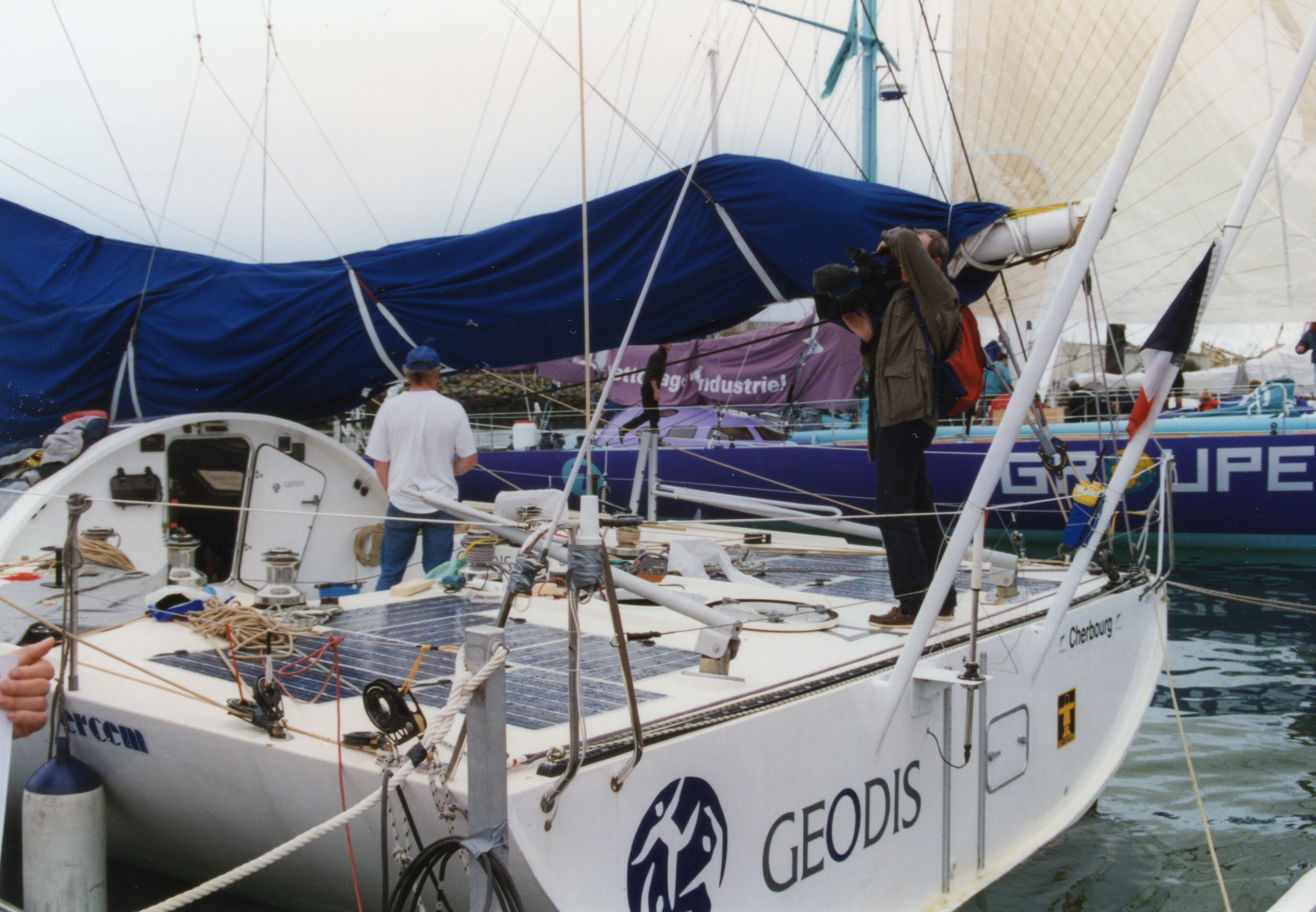

Development
- Designer: Group Finot, Finot-Conq
- Year: June 1994
- Builder: JMV Industries

Hull appendages
- Ballast: 25 Degree Canting Keel; 3000kg Keel Bulb + Water Ballast
- Rudder: Twin Rudders

Racing
- Class association: IMOCA 60

The IMOCA 60 class yacht Sceta Calberson 4 was designed by Finot-Conq and launched in the 1994 after being built by JMV Industries based in Cherbourg, France.

The hull and deck are made out of pre-impregnated T800H carbon fibre sandwich with a Nomex core. The bow region under the waterline is a single skin carbon composite. All of this has been cured at 120°C. The boat has central water ballast and is 2 tonnes lighter than previous generations.

== Racing results ==
Pos	Year	Race	Class	Boat name	Skipper	Notes	Ref
Round the world races
RET	2004	2004–2005 Vendée Globe	IMOCA 60	UUDS	Hervé Laurent (FRA)		
8	2000	2000–2001 Vendée Globe	IMOCA 60	Voila.fr	Bernard Gallay (FRA)		
1	1996	1996–1997 Vendée Globe	IMOCA 60	Geodis	Christophe Auguin (FRA)		
1	1994	BOC Challenge	IMOCA 60	Sceta-Calberson	Christophe Auguin (FRA)		
Transatlantic Races
Other Races
