= IMOCA 60 Aquitaine Innovations =

Round the World Offshore Racing Yachts

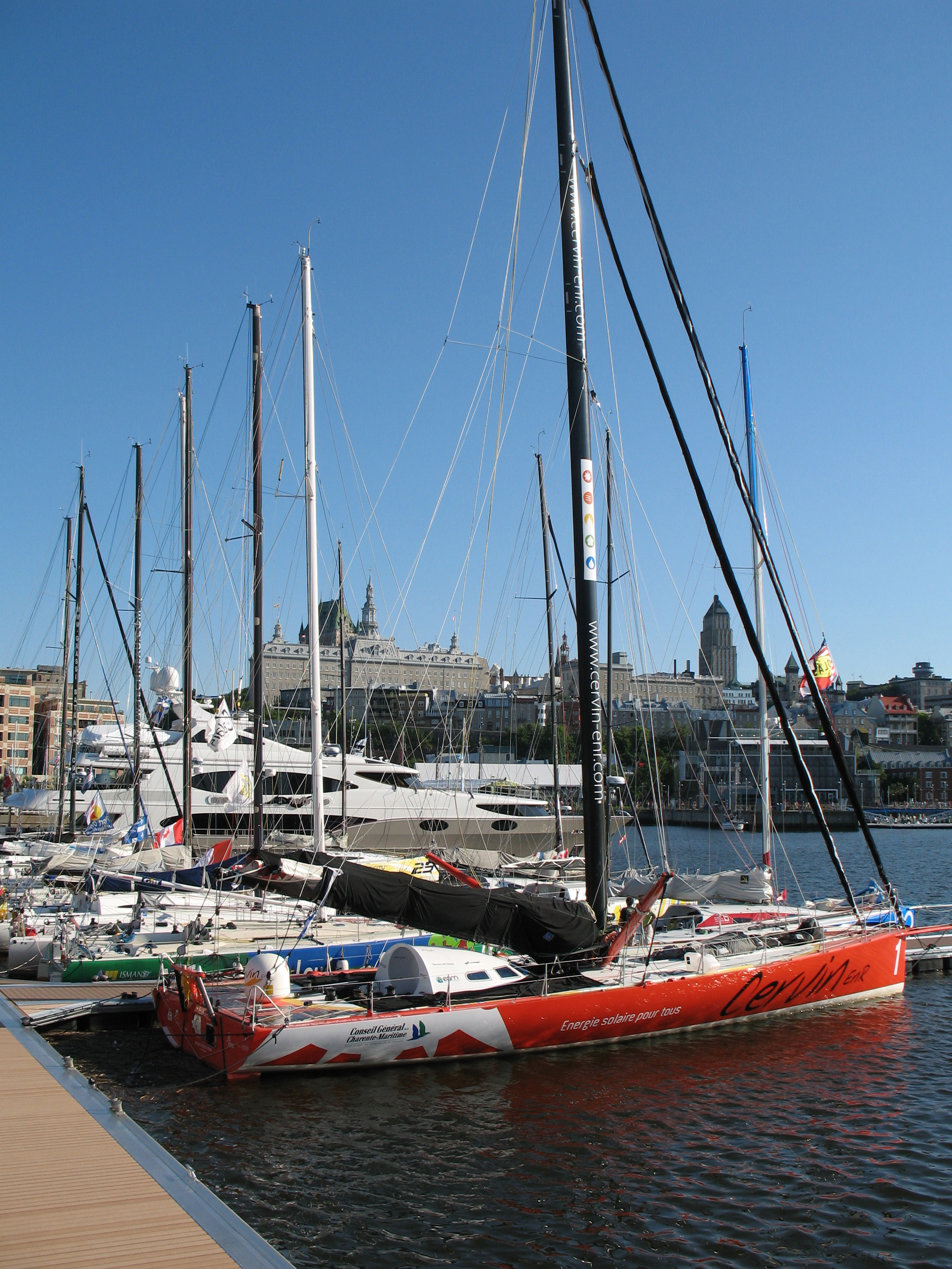

Development
- Designer: Group Finot, Finot-Conq
- Year: June 1996

Racing
- Class association: IMOCA 60

The IMOCA 60 class yacht Aquitaine Innovations, was designed by Finot-Conq, and launched in June 1996 after being made by its own build team under the name Aquitaine Composites with managed by Thierry Eluère based in France.

== Racing results ==
Pos	Year	Race	Class	Boat name	Skipper	Notes	Ref
Round the world races
DNF	2009	2008–2009 Vendée Globe	IMOCA 60	Aquarelle.com – Charente Maritime	Yannick Bestaven (FRA)	Day 4: dismasted	
DNF	2002	Around Alone Race	IMOCA 60	Garnier	Patrick de Radigues (BEL)		
13 / 24	2001	2000–2001 Vendée Globe	IMOCA 60	Aquitaine Innovations	Yves Parlier (FRA)	127d	
DNF	1997	1996–1997 Vendée Globe	IMOCA 60	Aquitaine Innovations	Yves Parlier (FRA)		
Transatlantic Races
8 / 15	2003	Transat B to B	IMOCA 60	Cervin EnR, FRA 01		18d 00h 58m	
13 / 17	2003	Transat Jacques Vabre	IMOCA 60	Cervin EnR, FRA 01	Yannick Bestaven (FRA); Ronan Guerin (FRA)	19d 23h 37m	
10 / 17	2003	Transat Jacques Vabre	IMOCA 60	Garnier	Patrick de Radigues (BEL); Hans Bouscholte (BEL)		
6 / 12	1998	Route du Rhum	IMOCA 60	Garnier	Patrick de Radigues (BEL)		
1	1998	Route du Rhum	IMOCA 60	Aquitaine Innovations	Thomas Coville (FRA)		
Other Races

== Construction ==
Hull Construction

- Bottom of the hull totally monolithique
- Preimpregnated carbon high temperature cured
- Hull stringers are made out of pultruded carbon
- Bulkhead are made of carbon cured in an autoclaves

Other Features

- Rotating wing-mast supported by two deck spreaders both reaching 6,48 m from the centreline (realized with Dassault and CTA, by Alucarbon)
- Reduced foresail
- Vectran shrouds
- Stay of the genoa roller furler in carbon
- Fixed keel with a carbon voile and inox inserts
- Special bulb weighed down by fragments of tungsten
