= IMOCA 60 Bagages Superior =

Sailboat

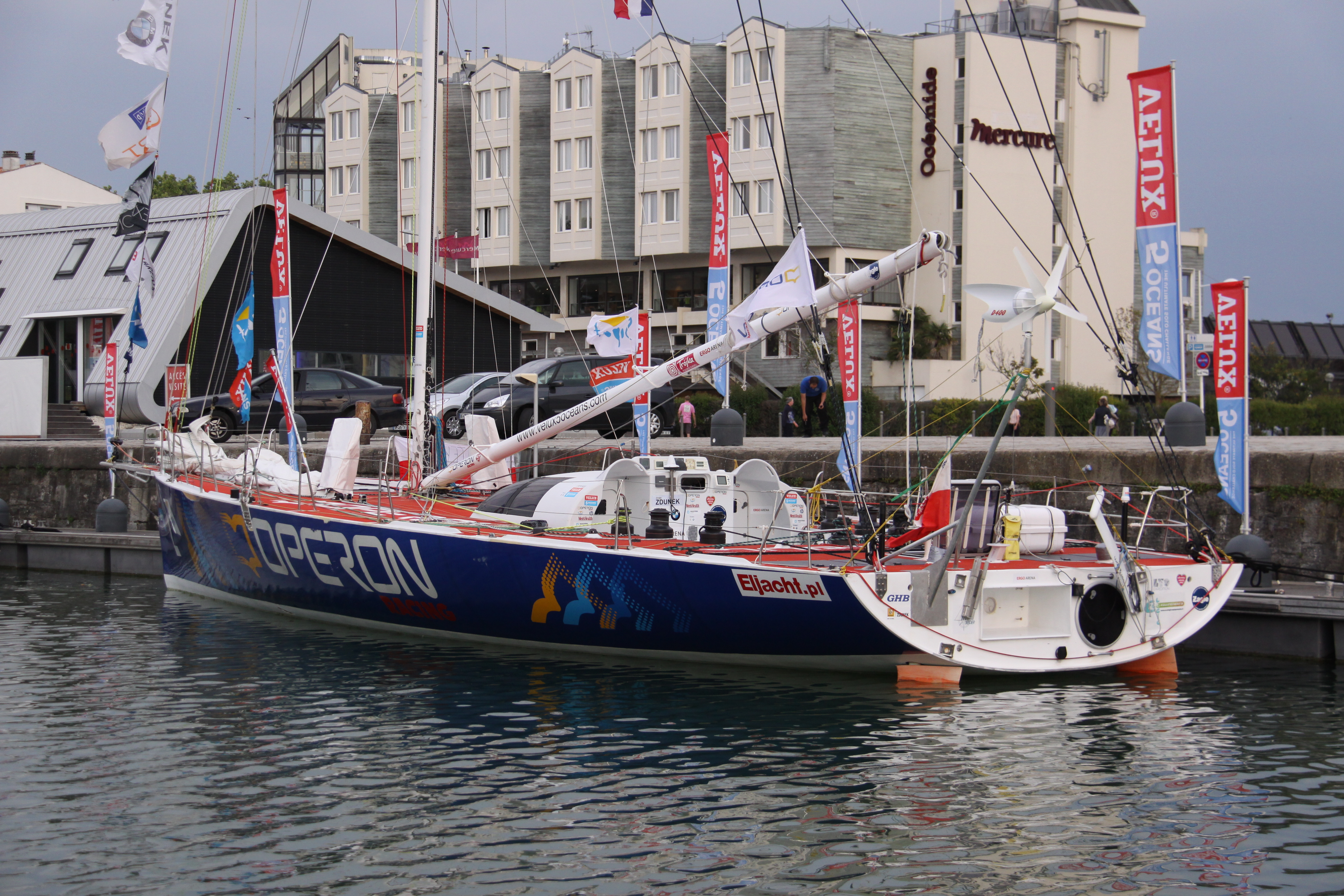

Development
- Designer: Group Finot, Finot-Conq
- Year: July 1992
- Builder: CDK Technologies

Hull appendages
- Rudder: Twin rudders

Rig
- Rig type: Originally a ketch Converted to a sloop

Racing
- Class association: IMOCA 60

The IMOCA 60 class yacht Bagages Superior 101 was designed by Group Finot and launched in 1992 after being built by CDK Technologies based in Lorient, France. The boat was the only ketch rig to win the Vendée Globe for later races the mizzen was removed but the boat is now based in Poland.

== Racing results ==
Pos	Year	Race	Class	Boat name	Skipper	Notes	Ref
Round the world races
2 / 5	2010	Velux 5 Oceans Race	IMOCA 60	OPERON RACING, POL 2	Zbigniew GUTKOWSKI		
RET	2000	2000–2001 Vendée Globe	IMOCA 60	Euroka - Un Univers de Service (No. 2000)	Eric Dumont (FRA)	Day 12 - Retired to Canaries	
4 / 15	1996	1996–1997 Vendée Globe	IMOCA 60	Cafe Legal - Le Gout	Eric Dumont (FRA)	116d 20h	
1	1992	1992–1993 Vendée Globe	IMOCA 60	Bagages Superior 101	Alain Gautier (FRA)	110d 02h	
Transatlantic Races
Other Races
