= IMOCA 60 Hungary =

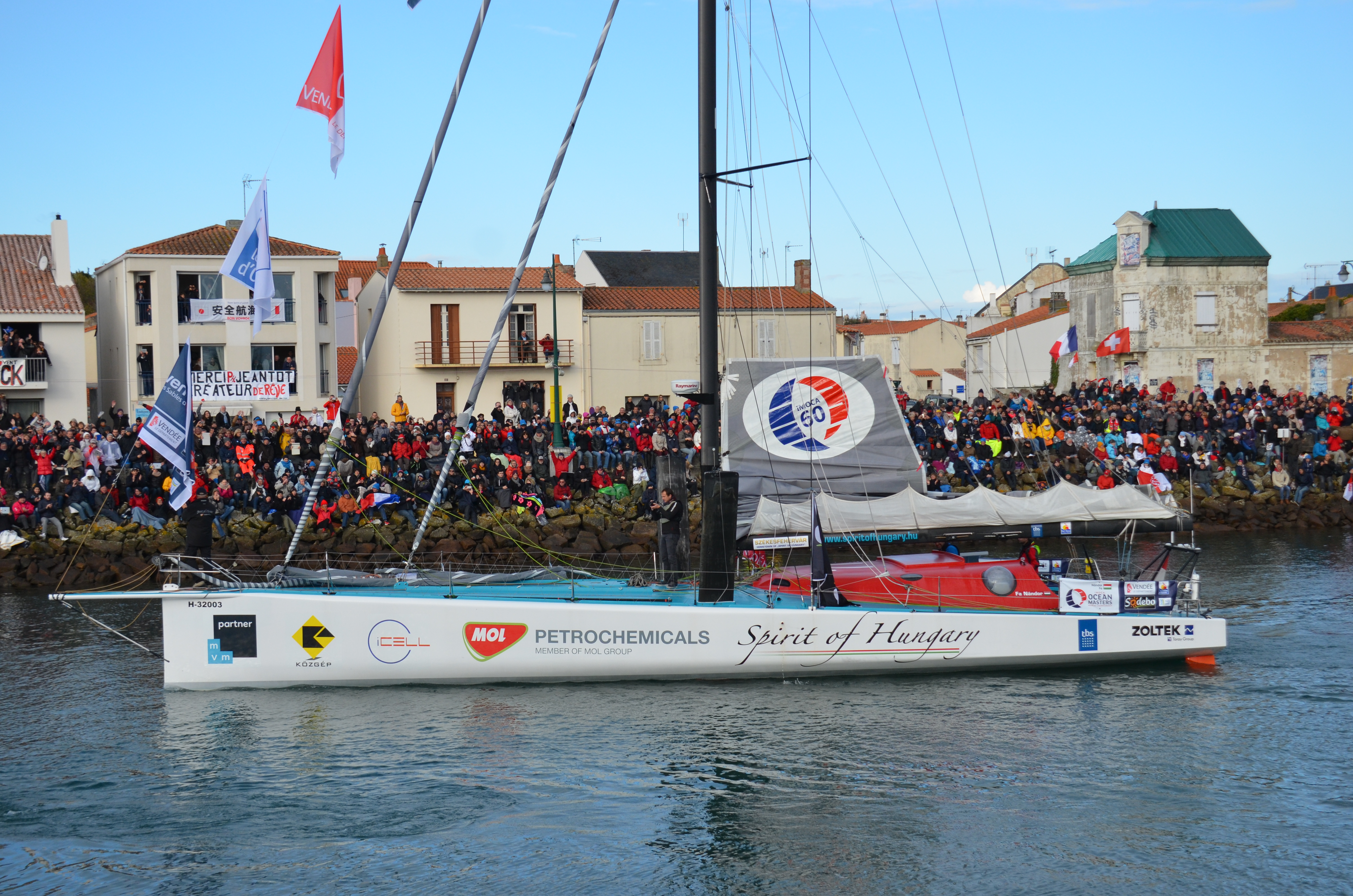

Development
- Designer: Nándor Fa
- Year: 7 April 2014
- Builder: Pauger Composites (HUN)

Racing
- Class association: IMOCA 60

The IMOCA 60 class yacht Spirit Of Hungary, HUN 77, was designed by Nándor Fa and Attila Dery-Hu for the former to compete in the Barcelona World Race and Vendée Globe and launched in the 7 April 2014 after being built Pauger Composite based in Kápolnásnyék in Hungary.

== Names and ownership ==
Spirit of Hungary (2014 - 2017)

- Skipper: Nándor Fa

Eyesea.BE (2019)

- Skipper: Denis Van Weynbergh

Laboratoires de Biarritz (2021)

- Skipper: Denis Van Weynbergh

D’Ieteren Group (2023)

- Skipper: Denis Van Weynbergh
- Sail No.: BEL 207

== Racing results ==
Pos	Year	Race	Class	Boat Name	Skipper	Notes	Ref
Round the world races
8 / 29	2017	2016–2017 Vendée Globe	IMOCA 60	Spirit Of Hungary	Nandor Fa (HUN)	93d 22h 52m 09s	
7 / 8	2014	Barcelona World Race	IMOCA 60	Spirit Of Hungary	Nandor Fa (HUN); Conrad Colman (NZL)		
Transatlantic Races
19 / 22	2021	Transat Jacques Vabre	IMOCA 60	Les Laboratoires de Biarritz: No Limit 4 Us, BEL 207	Tanguy Le Turquais; Denis Van Weynbergh	24d 06h 12m	
DNF	2015	Transat Jacques Vabre	IMOCA 60	Spirit Of Hungary	Nandor Fa (HUN); Peter Perenyl (HUN)		
Other Races
9 / 20	2019	Rolex Fastnet Race	IMOCA 60	Eyesea.BE, BEL 207	Lionel REIGNIER (FRA) + Crew	2d 20h 12m	
