= Nándor Fa =

French skipper and navigator

- Nándor Fa in 2026

Personal information
- Nationality: Hungary
- Born: 9 July 1953 (age 73) Székesfehérvár, Hungary

Sailing career
- Sport: Sailing
- Class: IMOCA 60

Nándor Fa (born 9 July 1953) is a Hungarian yachtsman.

== Biography ==
He first followed the family tradition from an early age and practiced wrestling but an injury forced him to change sports. This sports enthusiast then discovers kayaking and then sailing at the age of 27 years old. Passionate about sailing, he joined the Hungarian national team, sailing the Finn and Laser dinghy and also started to draw boats. As he cruised near Cape Horn on the 31-foot course he had built, he learned on Chilean radio that a solo round-the-world race with stopovers, the BOC Challenge, was passing by. This inspired him to want to participate.

He sailed around the world in 700 days with Jozsef Gal between 1985 and 1987 on the ship Szent Jupat, which they had built between 1981 and 1984.

Between 1988 and 1990 he built another boat, Alba Regia on which he participated in the BOC Challenge in 1990-1991 (10th in 165 days), then at the Vendée Globe in 1992-1993 (arrived 5th, after 128 days 16 hours 5 minutes and 4 seconds of racing).

He departed 1996–1997 Vendée Globe aboard Budapest, a new boat he built himself, but keel damage and then a collision with a cargo ship quickly forced him to abandon.

He came fourth in the 1997 Transat Jacques Vabre race 23 days 07 hours 12 minutes.

He participated in the 2016–2017 Vendée Globe on the boat Spirit of Hungary of which he is co-designer with Déry Attila although the boat was built by Pauger Composites in Hungary

== Career highlights ==
Pos	Year	Race	Class	Boat name	Notes	Ref
Round the world races
8th	2017	2016–2017 Vendée Globe	IMOCA 60	Spirit of Hungary	93 days, 22 hours and 53 minutes	
7th	2015	2014-2015 Barcelona World Race	IMOCA 60	Spirit of Hungary	110 days, 10 hours and 59 minutes with Conrad Colman (NZL) (USA)	
DNF	1997	1996–1997 Vendée Globe	IMOCA 60	Budapest	Collision	
5th	1993	1992–1993 Vendée Globe	IMOCA 60	K and H Bank Matav	128 days, 16 hours and 5 minutes	
10th	1991	1990-1991 BOC Challenge		Alba Regia	165 days	
Transatlantic Races
Other significant races

== Gallery ==
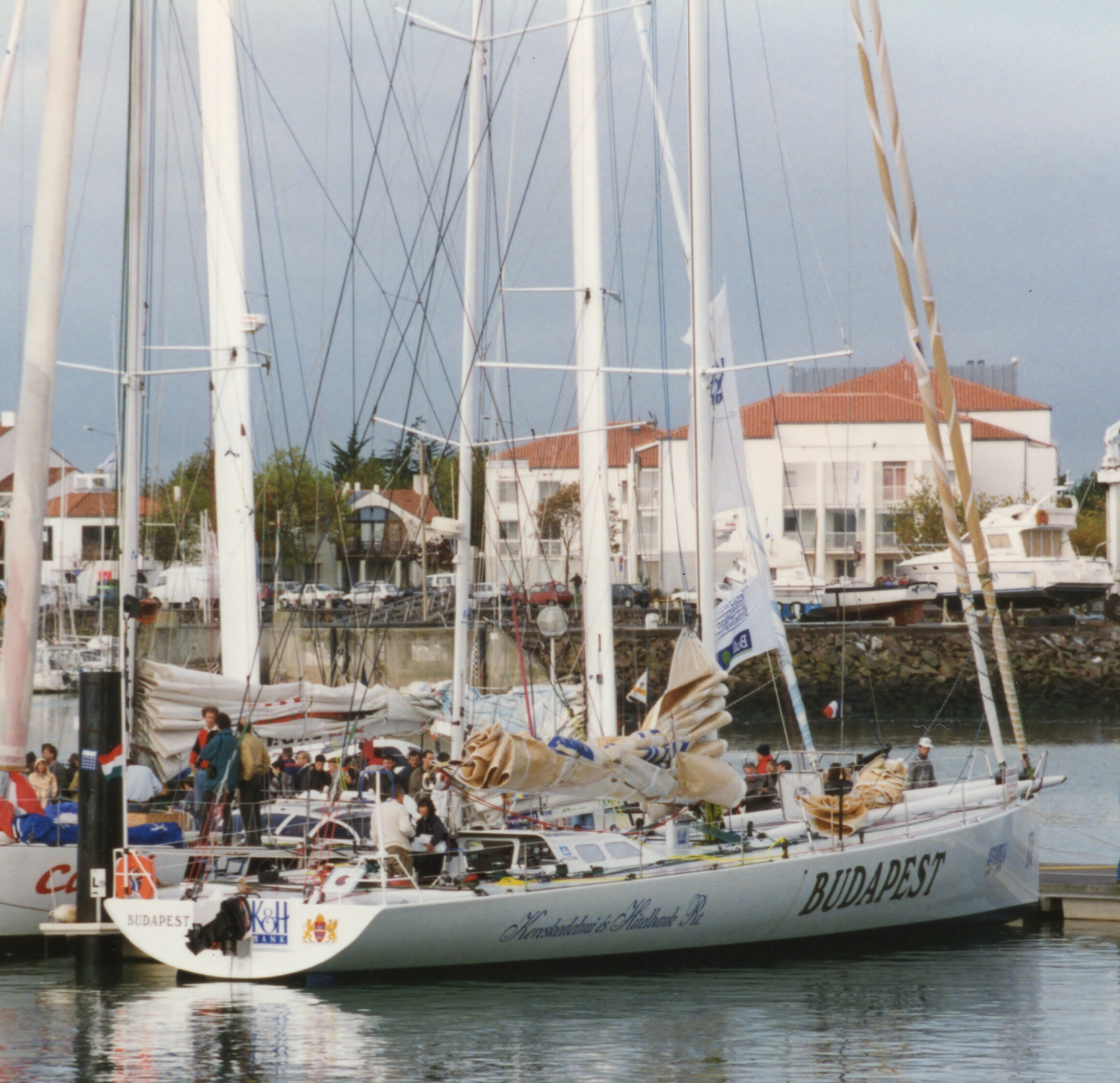
Budapest, bateau de Nándor Fa, au départ du 1996–1997 Vendée Globe

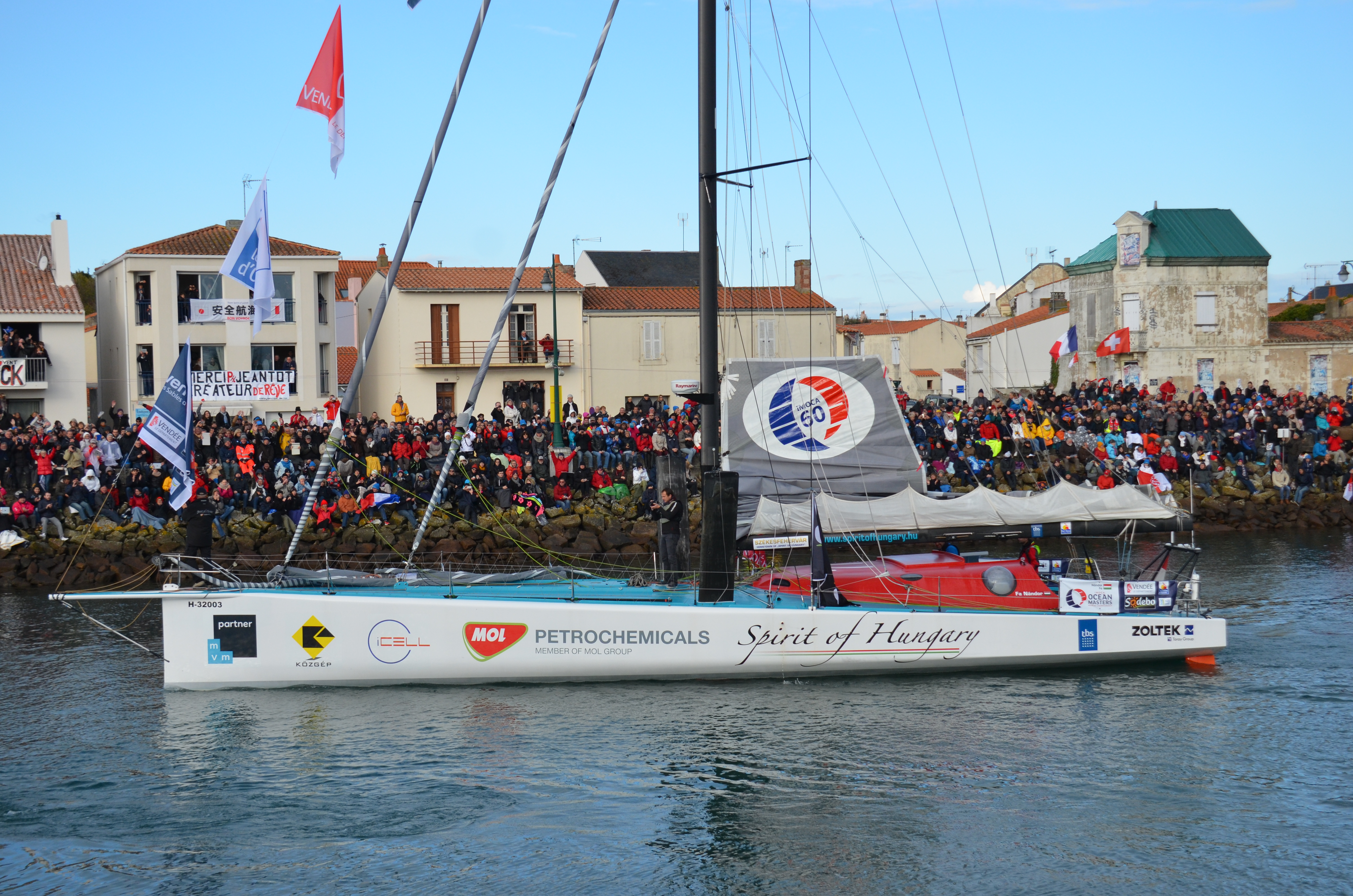
Nándor Fa au départ du 1996–1997 Vendée Globe

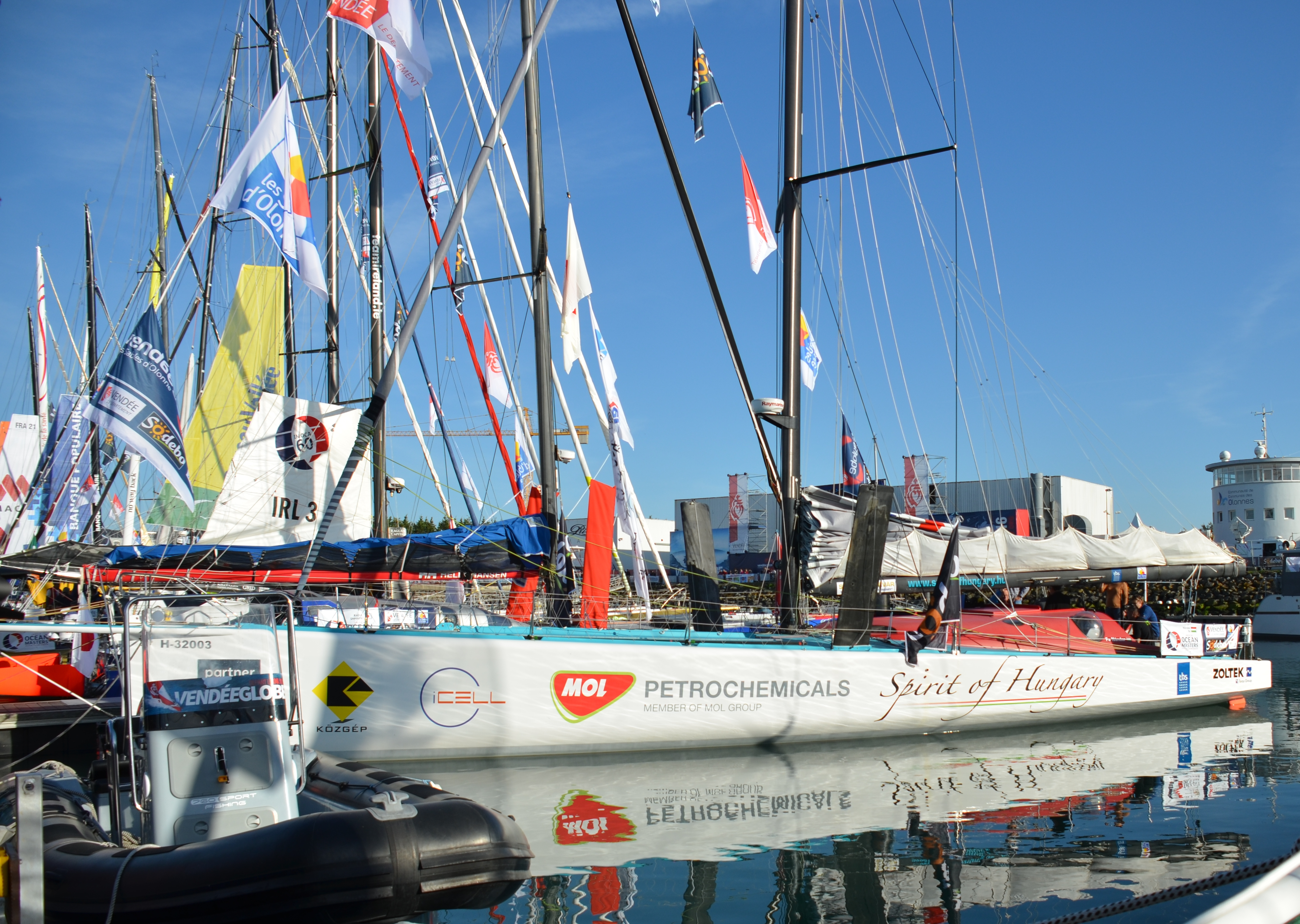
IMOCA 60 - Spirit of Hungary (2016)

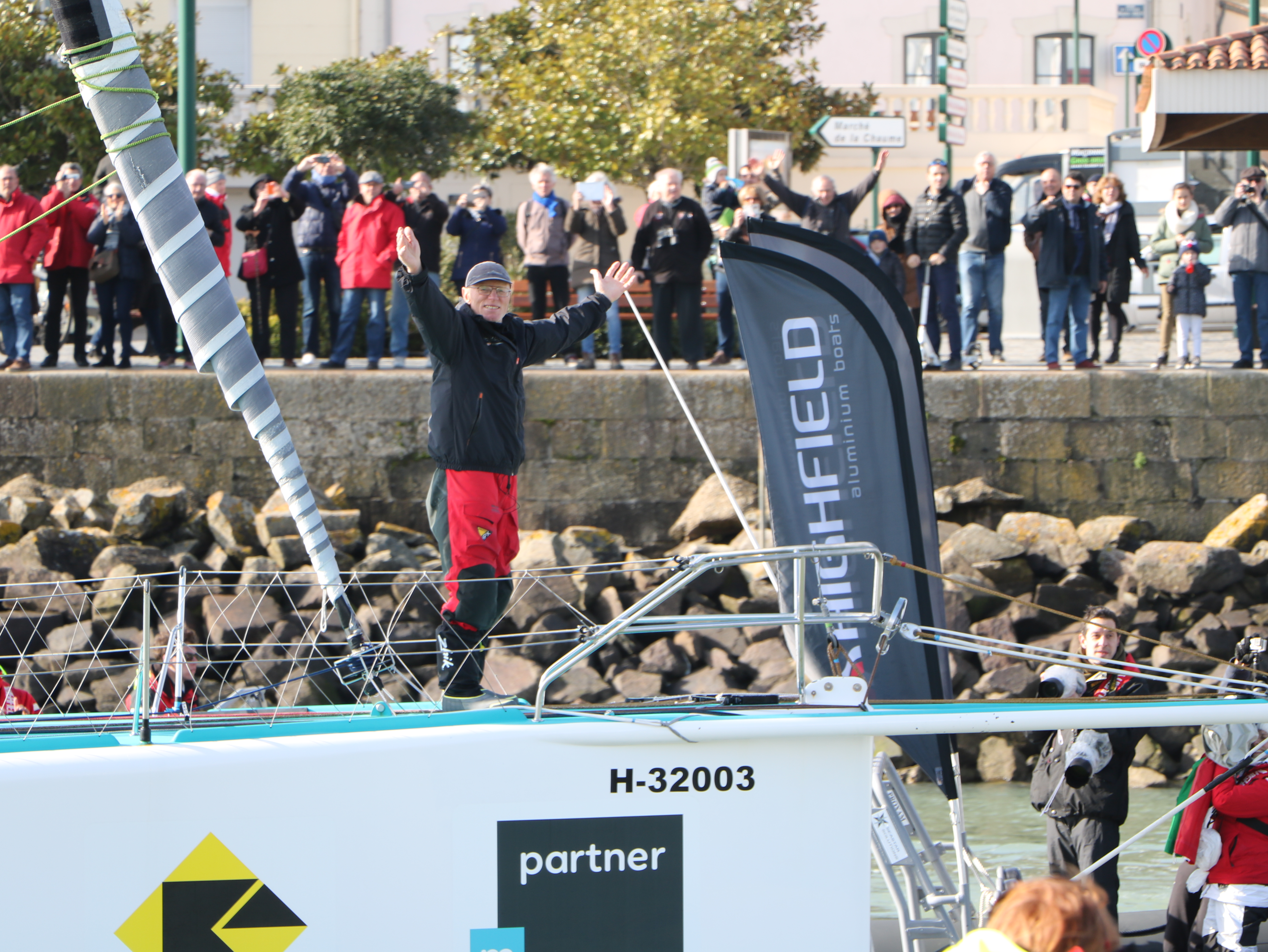
Arrival of Nándor in Le Sables d'Olonne of the 2016–2017 Vendée Globe

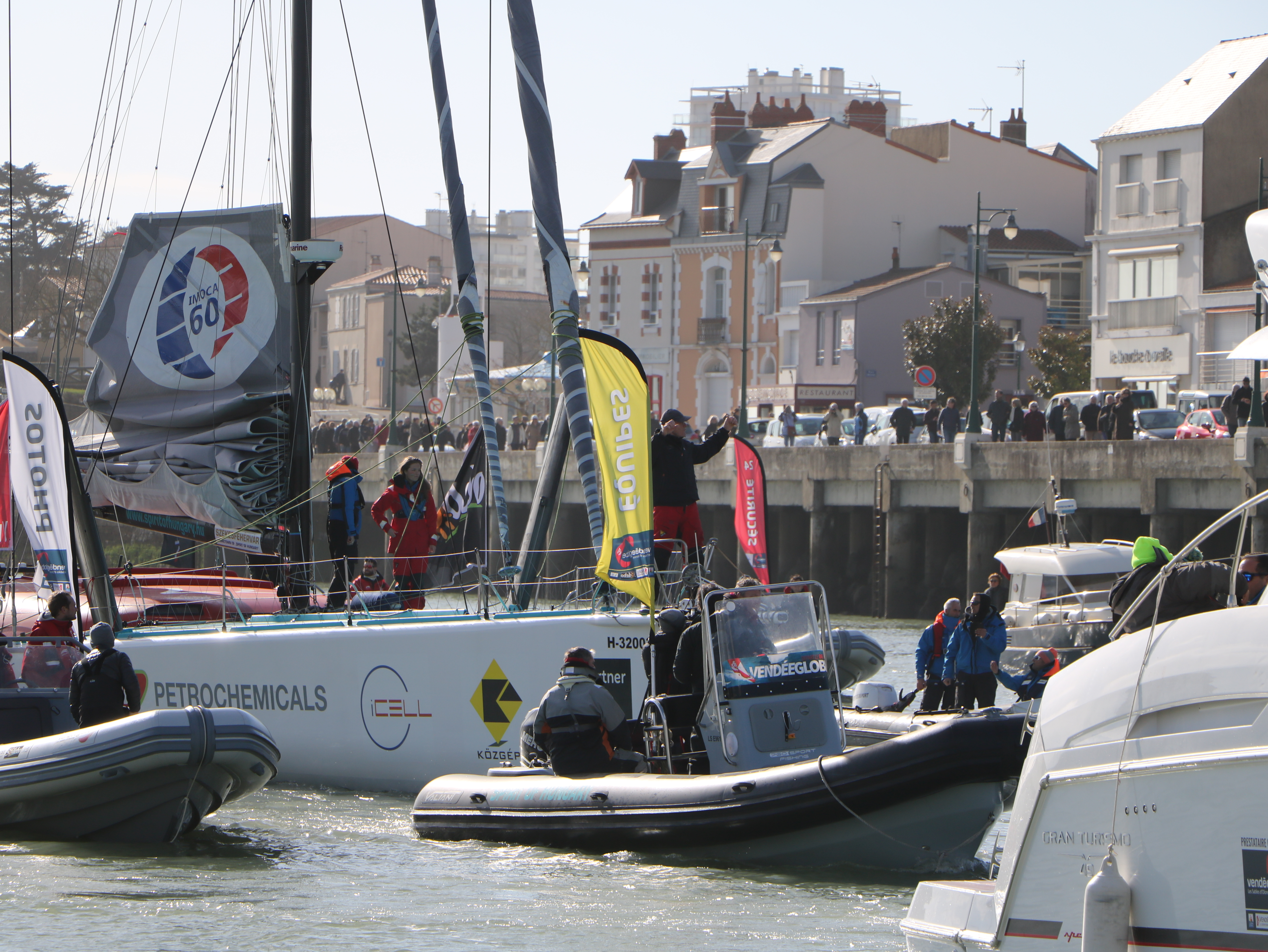
Arrival of Nándor in Le Sables d'Olonne of the 2016–2017 Vendée Globe
