= Thierry Dubois =

French offshore sailor and navigator

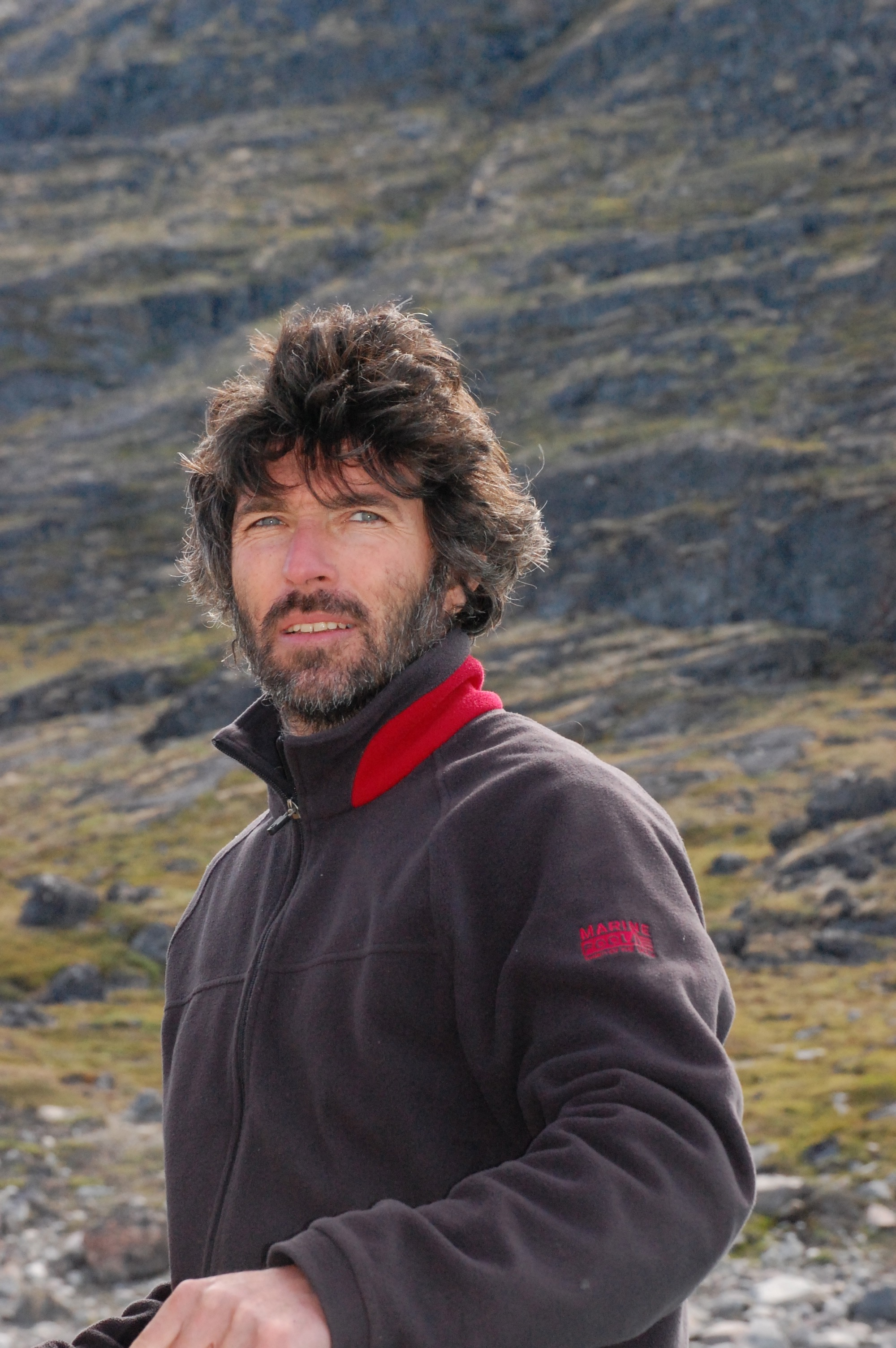

Personal information
- Nationality: French
- Born: 24 February 1967 (age 59) Saint-Germain-en-Laye

Sailing career
- Sport: Sailing

Thierry Dubois is a French sailor born on February 24, 1967, in Saint-Germain-en-Laye. He competed in high-level offshore solo races, including two unsuccessful attempts to complete the Vendee Globe in 1996 and 2000.

In the 1996–1997 race, he and fellow competitor Tony Bullimore were dramatically rescued by the Australian Navy. They first dropped Dubois a liferaft from an aircraft before sending in a helicopter to rescue him deep into the southern ocean.

Dubois came back in 2000 but electrical issues forced him to retire in New Zealand.

After this round-the-world trip, he stopped sailing, devoting himself to IMOCA and the construction of a schooner for navigation in the Arctic seas and to link his two passions the mountain and the sea. It was launched in 2010 and Thierry Dubois now offers his clients to sail with him in Greenland or Iceland on La Louise.
