= IMOCA 60 Groupe LG 2 =

Sailboat

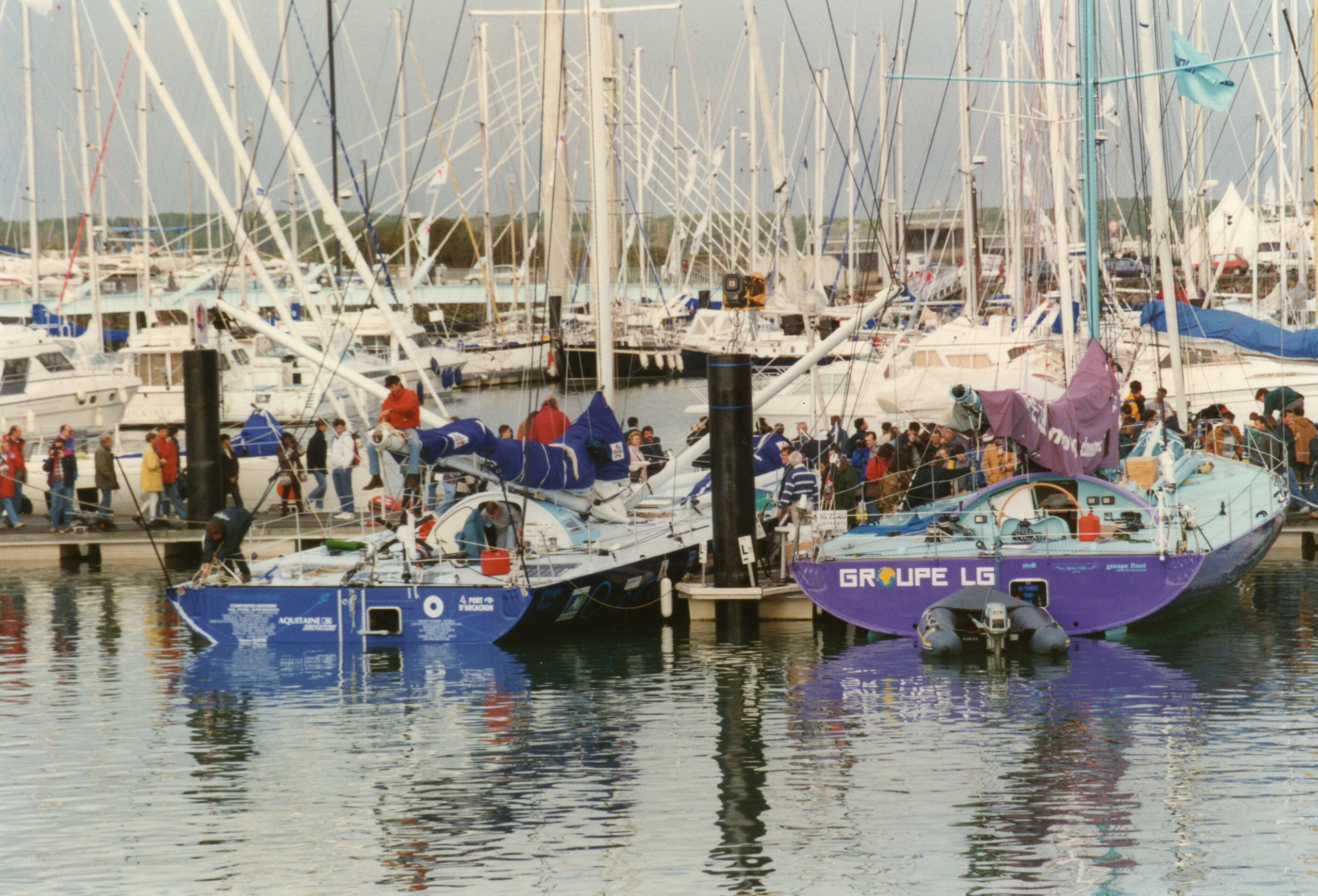

Racing
- Class association: IMOCA 60

The IMOCA 60 class yacht Group LG 2 was designed by Finot-Conq and launched in 1995 after being made by MAG-JMV in Cherbourg in France. The Canadian skipper Gerry Roufs lost his life when the boat overturned in the southern ocean during the 1996-1997 Vendée Globe.

== Racing results ==
Pos	Year	Race	Class	Boat name	Skipper	Notes	Ref
Round the world races
DNF	1996	1996–1997 Vendée Globe	IMOCA 60	Groupe LG 2	Gerry Roufs (CAN)		
Transatlantic Races
1 / 7	1995	C-Star	IMOCA 60	Groupe LG 2	Gerry Roufs (CAN)		
Other Races
