= IMOCA 60 Credit Agricole 4 =

Sailboat

Development
- Designer: Marc Lombard, Marc Lombard Yacht Design Group
- Builder: Philippe Jeantot

The IMOCA 60 class yacht Credit Agricole IV was designed and built by Marc Lombard. The boat's original skipper formed a company "Jeantot Marine" which built the boat. It was launched in January 1989. The boat was lost while racing unofficially in the 1996-1997 Vendée Globe with Italian skipper Raphael Dinelli dramatically rescued by fellow competitor Pete Goss.

== Racing results ==
Pos	Year	Race	Class	Boat name	Skipper	Notes	Ref
Round the world races
N/A	1993	Unofficial Competitor; 1996–1997 Vendée Globe	IMOCA 60	Deuz Mains Pour L'Enfance	Raphael Dinelli (ITA)	Capsized and boat abandoned skipper rescued by fellow competitor Pete Goss (GBR)	
3 / 13	1991	BOC Challenge	IMOCA 60	Credit Agricole IV	Philippe Jeantot (FRA)	165d 23h 25m	
4 / 13	1989	1989–1990 Vendée Globe	IMOCA 60	Credit Agricole IV	Philippe Jeantot (FRA)	128d 19h	
Transatlantic Races
Other Races
