= Didier Munduteguy =

French offshore sailor and navigator

Personal information
- Nationality: French
- Born: 19 May 1953 (age 73) Bayonne, Basque Country.

Sailing career
- Sport: Sailing

Didier Munduteguy is a French sailor. He twice competed in the Vendée Globe retiring from the 1996-1997 and finishing in 14th in 2000-2001 edition.

After his ocean racing days he started a career in seaport administration, first in Saint Jean de Luz and more recently with the Bayonne Port Authority.
