= Catherine Chabaud =

French navigator, journalist and politician (born 1962)

Catherine Chabaud MEP
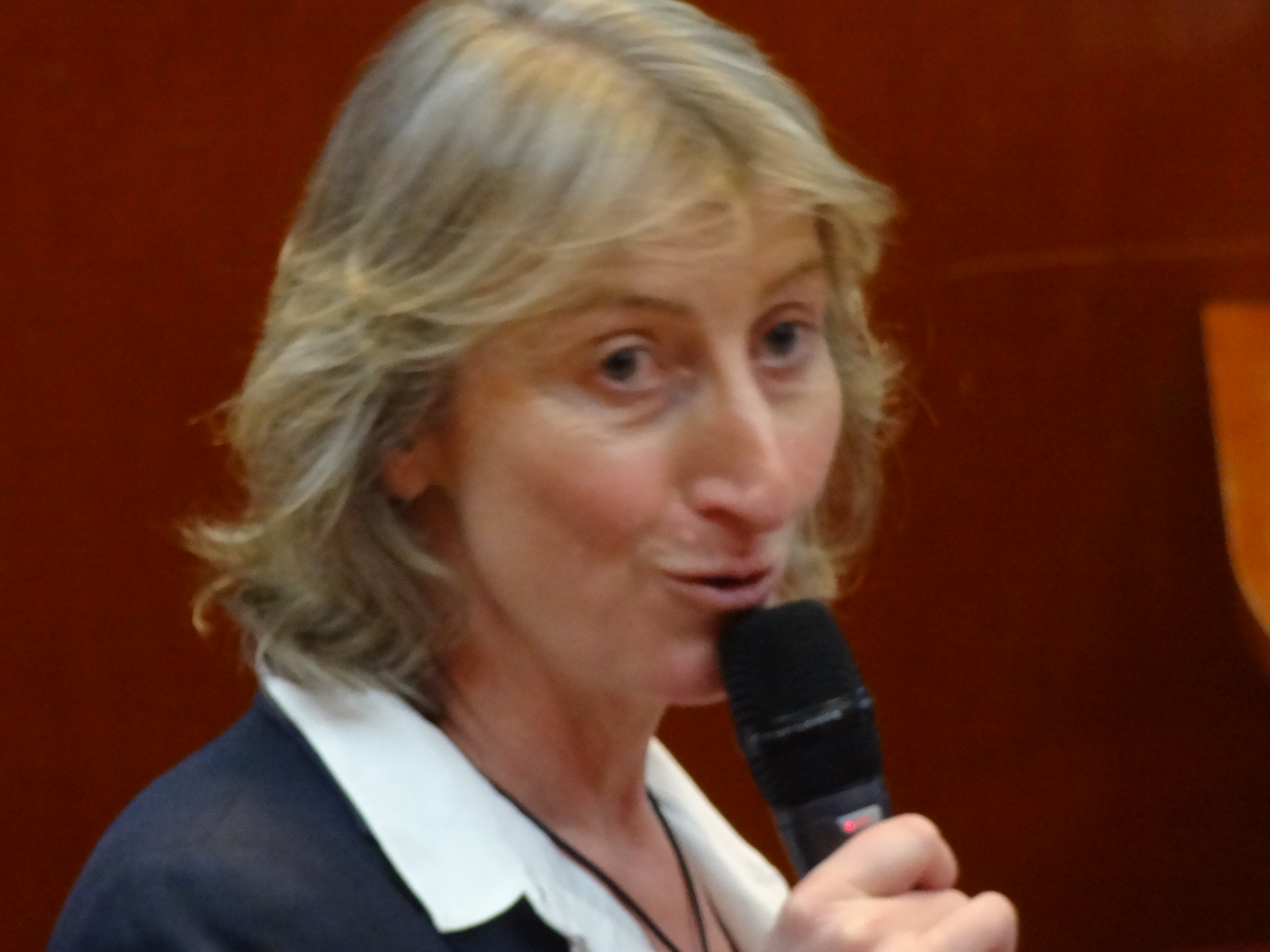

Minister Delegate for the Sea and Fishery
- Incumbent
- Assumed office 12 October 2025
- Prime Minister: Sébastien Lecornu
- Minister: Monique Barbut
- Preceded by: Agnès Pannier-Runacher (as Minister)

Member of the European Parliament for France
- In office 2 July 2019 – 15 July 2024

Personal details
- Born: 29 November 1962 (age 63) Bron, France
- Party: Democratic Movement; European Union: European Democratic Party

Catherine Chabaud (born 29 November 1962) is a French navigator, journalist and politician of the Democratic Movement (MoDem) who has been serving as Minister Delegate for the Sea and Fishery in the government of Prime Minister Sébastien Lecornu since 2025. She previously served as a Member of the European Parliament from 2019 to 2024.

== Career in sports ==
In 1997 Chabaud became the first woman to complete the Vendee Globe yacht race a solo round the World non-stop race finishing 6th in 3rd edition. She is the only female to have skippered the winning entry on corrected time in the Fastnet Race, doing so in 1999.

== Political career ==
After Chabaud returned from her circumnavigation, she began working as a campaigner and adviser to the French government on oceans and marine protection.

As Member of the European Parliament, Chabaud served on the Committee on Development. In this capacity, she authored a 2021 report on marine plastic.

In addition to her committee assignments, Chabaud was part of the European Parliament Intergroup on Climate Change, Biodiversity and Sustainable Development, the European Parliament Intergroup on Seas, Rivers, Islands and Coastal Areas and the MEPs Against Cancer group.
