= Hervé Laurent =

French offshore sailor and navigator (1957–2024)

Personal information
- Nationality: French
- Born: 2 May 1957 Lorient, France
- Died: 29 August 2024 (aged 67)

Sailing career
- Sport: Sailing

Hervé Laurent (2 May 1957 – 29 August 2024) was a French sailor from Lorient, Morbihan. He competed in the Vendee Globe round the yacht race twice in 1996 and 2004. Laurent died on 29 August 2024, at the age of 67.

== Career highlights ==
Year	Pos	Race	Class	Boat name	Notes	Ref.
Round the world races
2005	DNF	2004-2005 Vendee Globe	IMOCA 60	UUDS	Retired rudder problems	
1996	3	1996-1997 Vendee Globe	IMOCA 60	Groupe LG-Traitmat	114 days 16hrs 43mins	
Trans Oceanic Races
2007	11	Transat Jacques Vabre		Maisonneuve		
2005	7	Transat Jacques Vabre	IMOCA 60	UUDS		
2004	7	Single-Handed Trans-Atlantic Race	IMOCA 60	UUDS		
2002	1	Transat AG2r	Beneteau Figaro 2	COLBERT ORCO	with Rodolphe Jacq	
1996	8	Single-Handed Trans-Atlantic Race	IMOCA 60	Groupe LG1		
1994		Route du Rhum				
1993	4	Transat Jacques Vabre				
1992	4	1992 OSTAR Race	60 ft T	Took Took		
Other Results
2008		Tour de France à la Voile				
1995		Solitaire du Figaro				
