= Gerry Roufs =

Canadian sailor

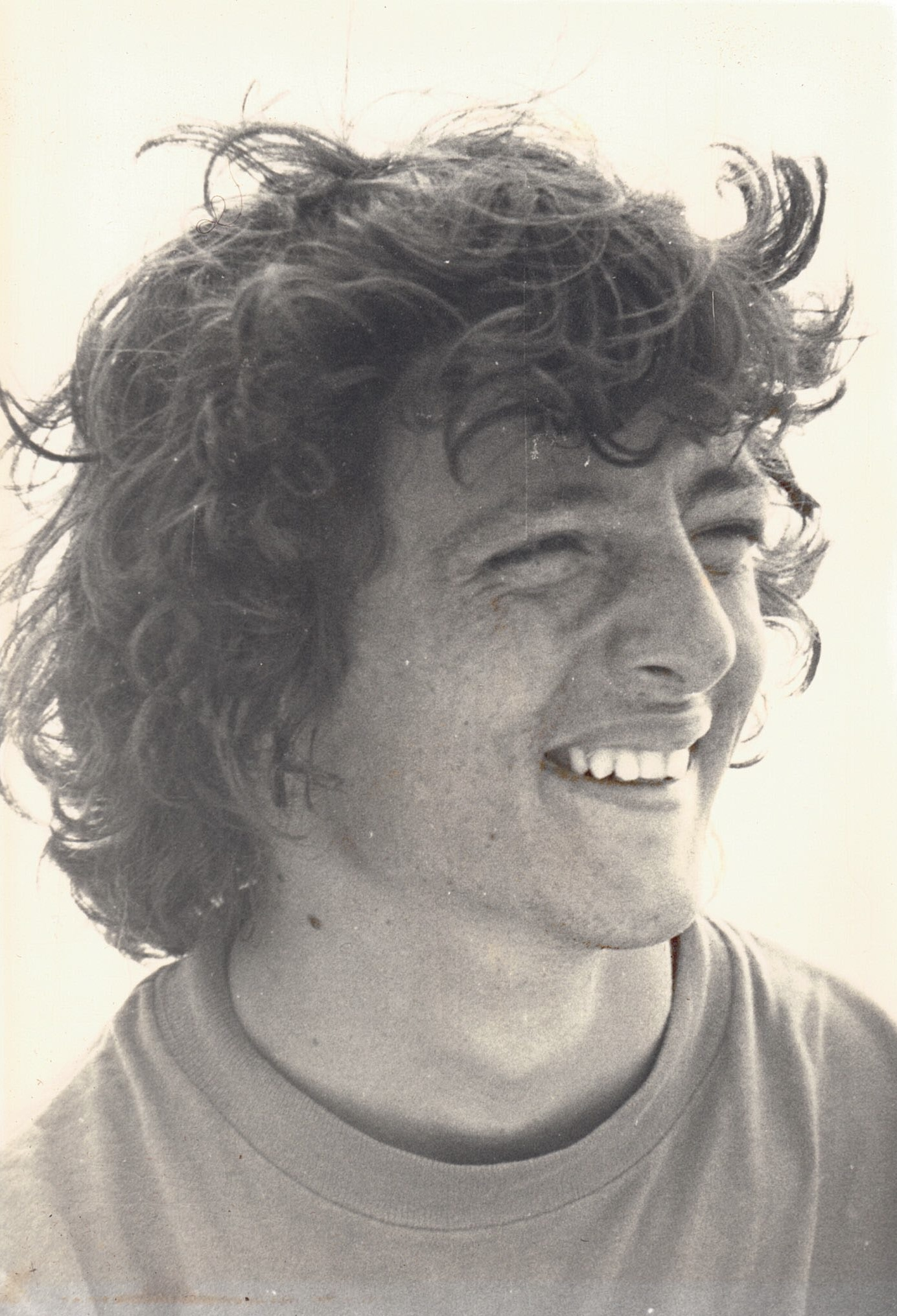
Gerry Roufs

Gerry Roufs (1953 – January 1997) was a Canadian competitive sailor.

== Sailing career ==
Roufs was born in Montreal, Canada. In 1978, along with crewman Charles Robitaille, he placed second at the 470 class World Championships held in Marstrand, Sweden.

== Death ==
He disappeared at sea in his boat, Groupe LG 2 in January 1997, in the South Pacific Ocean, while taking part in the 1996–1997 edition of the Vendée Globe, the round-the-world, single-handed, non-stop yacht race. Roufs was in second place in the race when his Argos position-indicating beacon ceased to transmit. His boat, Groupe LG 2, was found on the coast of Chile in July 1997. His last known position was 55°S 124°W, 369 nm south of Point Nemo, the Oceanic Pole of Inaccessibility.

== See also ==
- List of people who disappeared mysteriously at sea
