= Patrick de Radiguès =

French offshore sailor and navigator

Personal information
- Nationality: Belgian
- Born: Patrick Marie Jean Colette Ghislain de Radiguès de Chennevière; 25 July 1956 (age 70)

Sailing career
- Sport: Sailing

Patrick Marie Jean Colette Ghislain de Radiguès de Chennevière was born in Leuven, Belgium on 25 July 1956 and now based in Monaco. He started his racing cars and motorcycles competing at Le Mans. He started sailing world at the 36 years old and liked the adventure of short handed offshore. He was lucky to survive the 2000 Vendee Globe accident in which he was knocked unconscious and the boat washed up ashore.

== Race results ==
Winner of the 1984 Bol d'Or,
2nd in the 1984 Motorcycle Endurance Championship
3rd of the Transat Jacques Vabre on the Novia with Yves Le Cornec
5th of the Transat Québec-Saint-Malo on the Novia(1995)
Not ranked at the 1996–1997 Vendée Globe on AFIBEL
Abandoned at the 2000–2001 Vendée Globe on the IMOCA 50 Libre Belgique
Coskipper by Jean-Luc Nélias on the Trimaran Belgacom (2001)

=== FIM Endurance World Championship ===
Year	Bike	Rider	TC
1984	Suzuki	(Belgium) Patrick de Radiguès (France) Jean-Pierre Oudin	3rd
1985	Suzuki	(Belgium) Patrick de Radiguès	3rd
