= Éric Dumont (sailor) =

Éric Dumont is a former French offshore professional sailor who participated in the 1996–1997 Vendée Globe in the yacht Café Legal-Le Goût and again in 2000–2001 Vendée Globe onboard Euroka Services where he retired due to rudder damage.
