= Conrad Colman =

New Zealand sailor

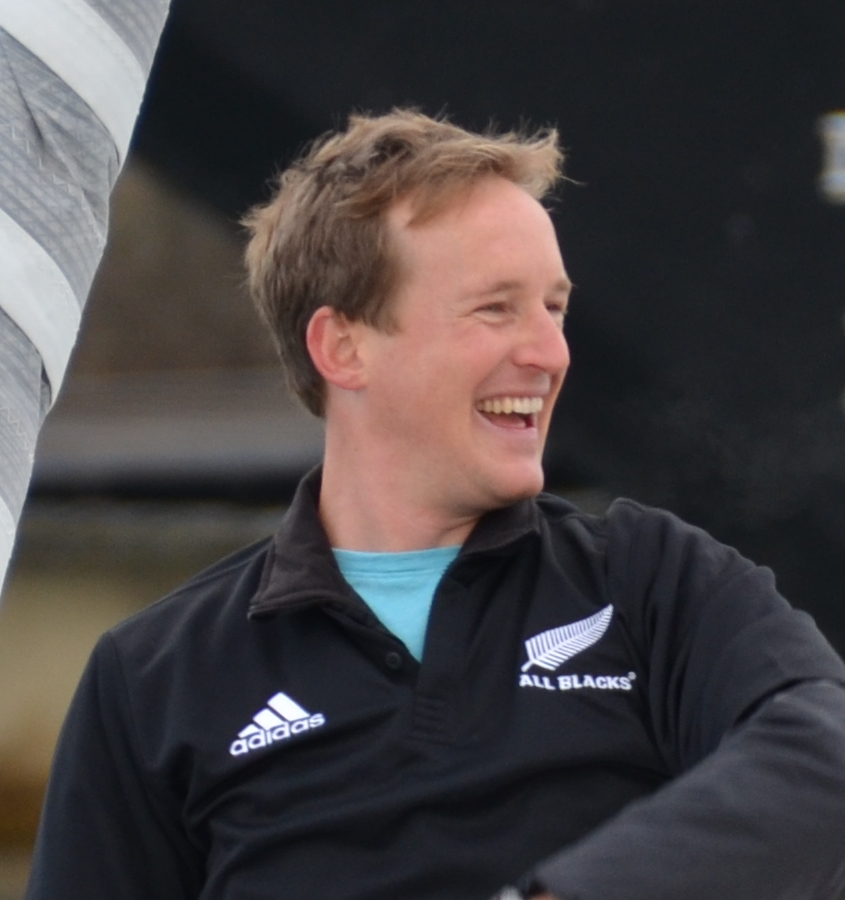
- Conrad Colman in November 2016, about to start the Vendée Globe
- Born: 2 December 1983 (age 42)
- Occupation: Yachtsman
- Known for: Single-handed yacht racing

Conrad Colman (born 1983) is a yachtsman from New Zealand with dual nationality of New Zealand and America and is now based in France. In 2016, he became the first New Zealander to compete in the famous solo around-the-world race, the Vendée Globe. On 10 February 2017 Colman was in 10th place, 740 miles from the finish line (having completed 97% of the race's 27,440 nautical mile circumnavigation) when his IMOCA 60, the Foresight Natural Energy, was dismasted. Two weeks later he became the 3rd sailor in history to complete the Vendée Globe under jury rig, taking 16th place in the race with a time of just under 110 days 2 hours. Colman ran out of food after the dismasting, and completed the race on survival rations pillaged from his life raft.

Foresight Natural Energy is the same yacht that Jean-Baptiste Dejeanty used in the 2008–09 Vendée Globe and it is powered entirely by renewable energy. When he crossed the finish line, Colman became the first skipper to complete the Vendée Globe using no fossil fuels.
