= Christophe Auguin =

French yacht racer

Christophe Auguin (born 10 December 1959 in Granville, Manche) is a French yachtsman. He is the only sailor to have won three single-handled sailing races around the globe: the BOC Challenge twice (1990-1991 and 1994-1995) and the Vendée Globe (1996-1997).

He also won the Solitaire du Figaro in 1986.
