= Yves Parlier =

French sailor (born 1960)

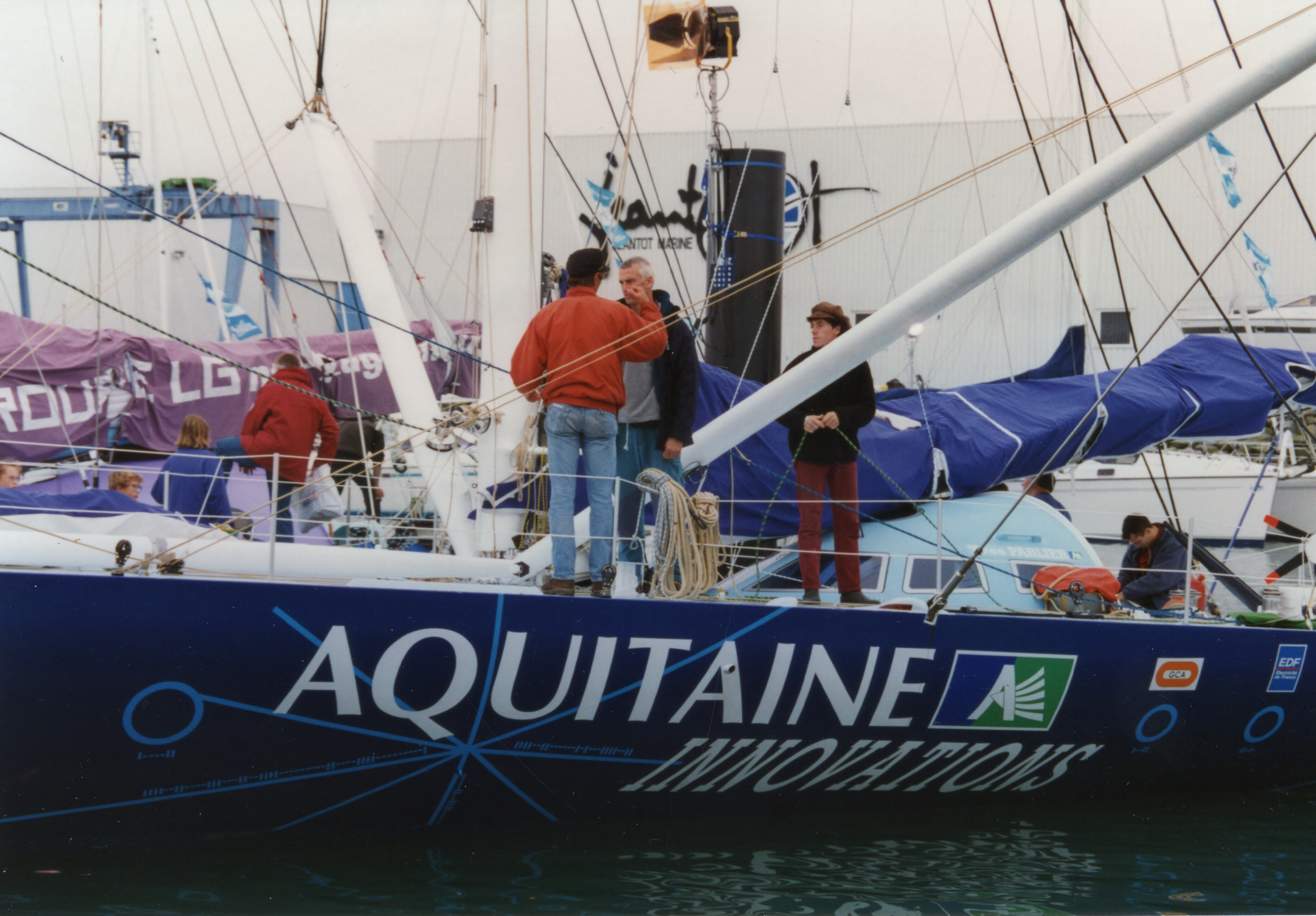
Yves Parlier

Yves Parlier (born 14 November 1960) is a French sailor. He is very well known in the offshore sailing world and generally in France, where he was elected France's top sports personality in 2002.

Nicknamed "The extraterrestrial" for his sailing exploits and accomplishments, Parlier currently holds two offshore 24-hour distance sailing records, set in April and May 2006.

== Career ==
Yves Parlier won (or participated in) the following events:

- 1985: Mini Transat 6.50
- 1991: Solitaire du Figaro
- 1992: Single-Handed Trans-Atlantic Race
- 1993 / 94: Vendée Globe participation
- 1993: Route du Café
- 1994: Route du Rhum
- 1996 / 97: Vendée Globe participation
- 1997: Transat Jacques Vabre (with Eric Tabarly)
- 1998: Route de l'Or
- 1999: Course de l'Europe
- 2000 / 01: Vendée Globe participation
- 2001: Sailings on the multihull Banque Populaire with Lalou Roucayrol

Winners of the Grand Prix of Zeebruge
