= IMOCA 60 Solidaires =

Round the World Racing Yacht

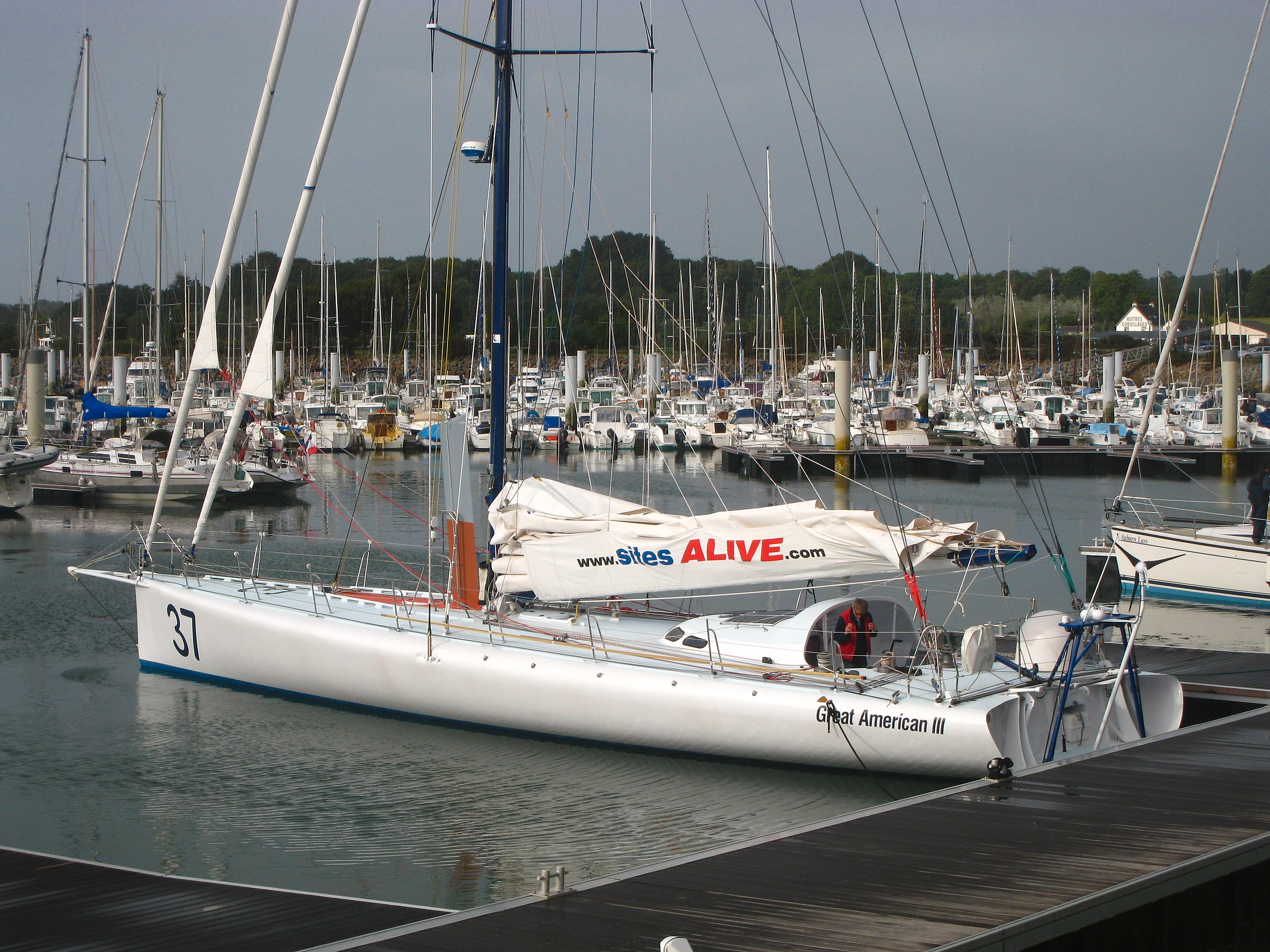

Development
- Designer: Joubert-Nivelt Design
- Builder: Thierry Dubois

The IMOCA 60 class yacht Solidaires, 50 was designed by Bernard Nivelt and launched in the March 1999 after being built Thierry Dubois in France.

== Racing results ==
Pos	Year	Race	Class	Boat name	Skipper	Notes	Ref
Round the world races
3 / 5	2011	2010-2011 Velux 5 Oceans Race	Eco 60	ACTIVE HOUSE, 84	Derek Hatfield (CAN)		
9 / 29	2009	2008–2009 Vendée Globe	IMOCA 60	Great American III	Richard Wilson (USA)	121d 00h 40m	
DNF	2005	2004–2005 Vendée Globe	IMOCA 60	VM Matériaux	Patrice Carpentier (FRA)		
DNF	2001	2000–2001 Vendée Globe	IMOCA 60	Whirlpool	Thierry Dubois (FRA)		
Transatlantic Races
Other Races

== Timeline ==
=== VM-Matériaux ===
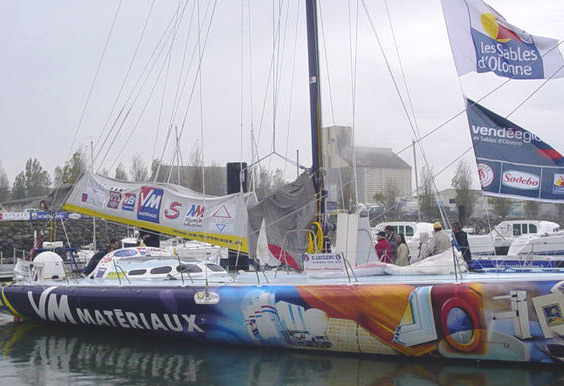

=== Great American III ===
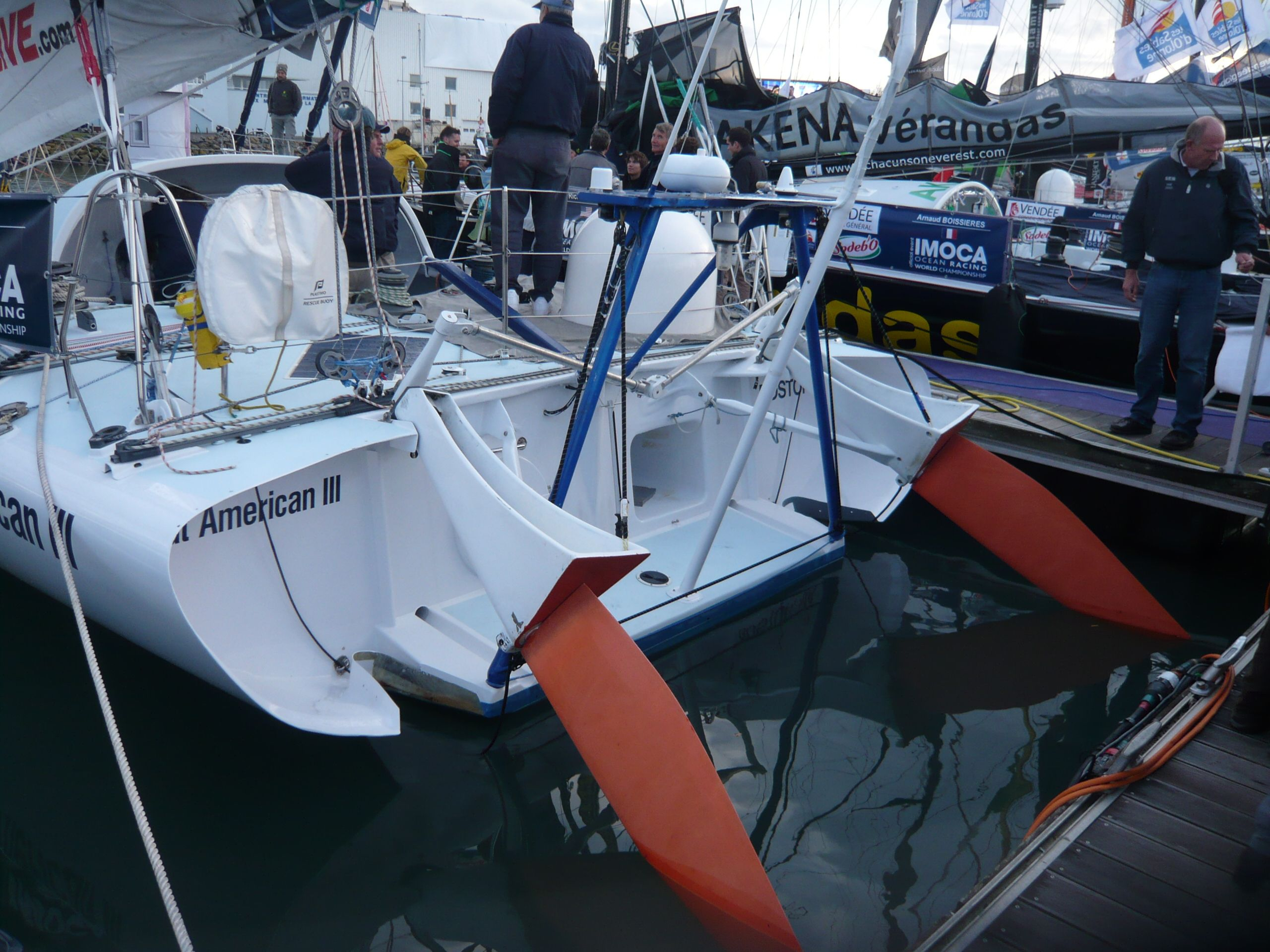

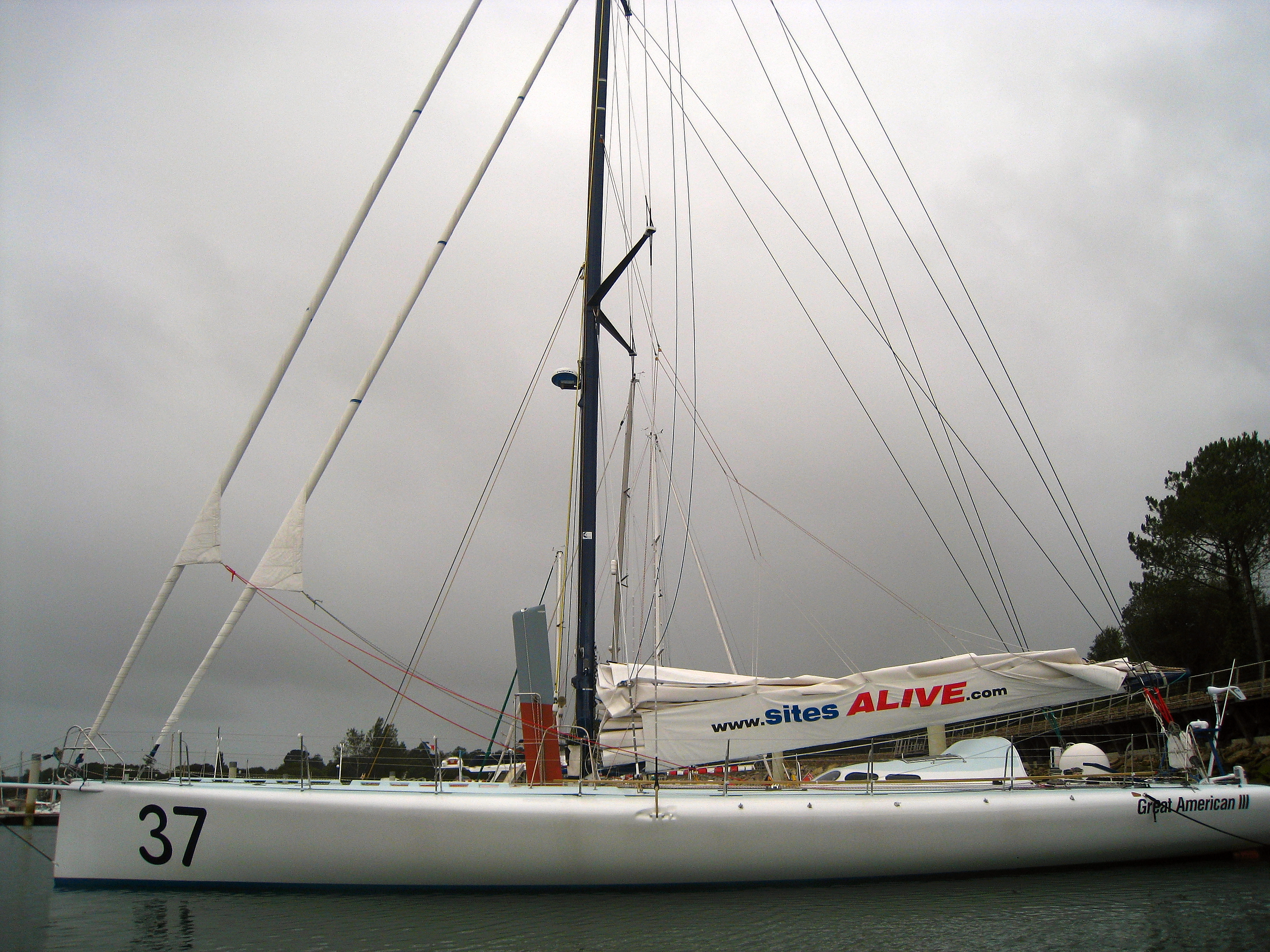

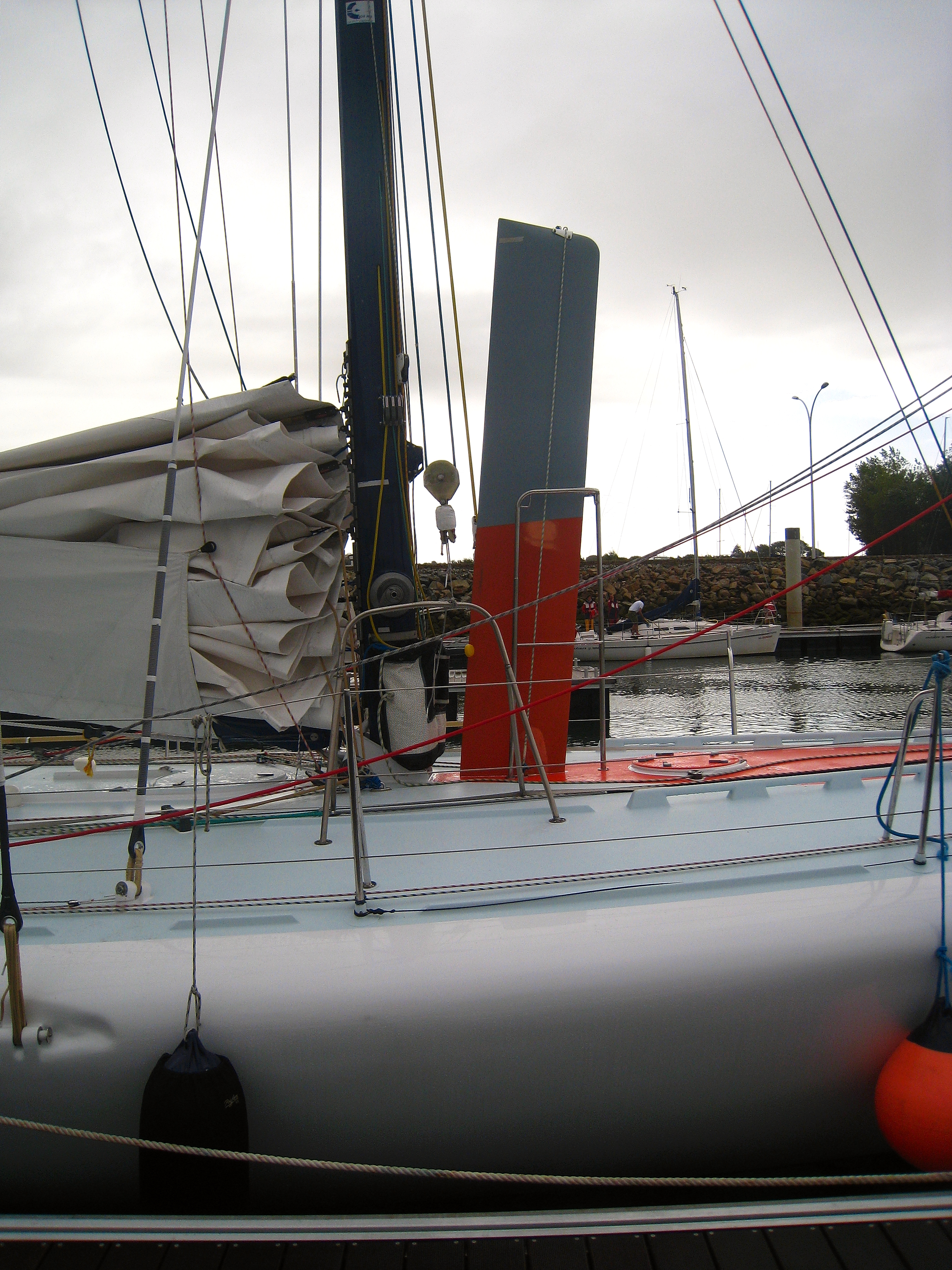

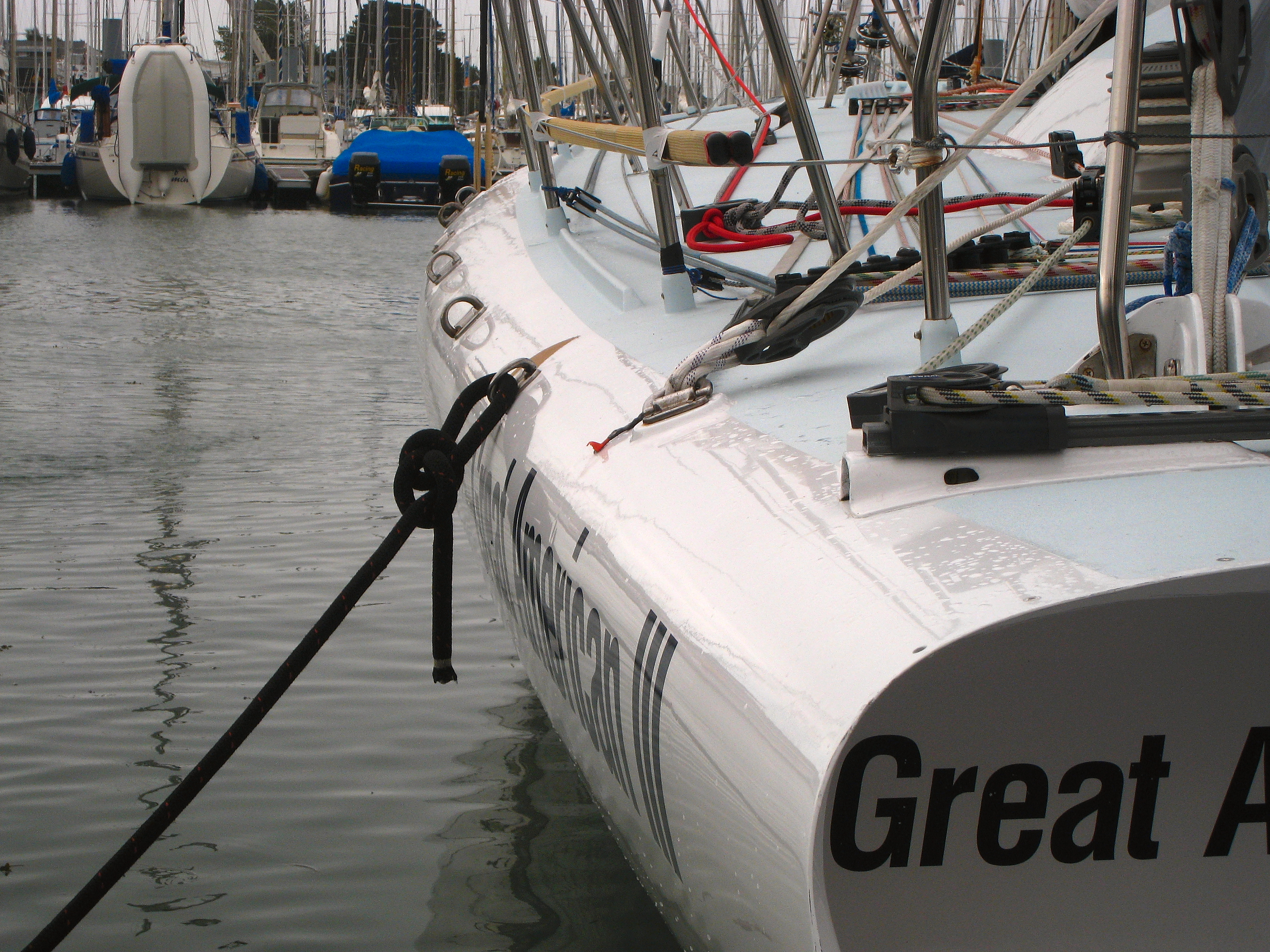

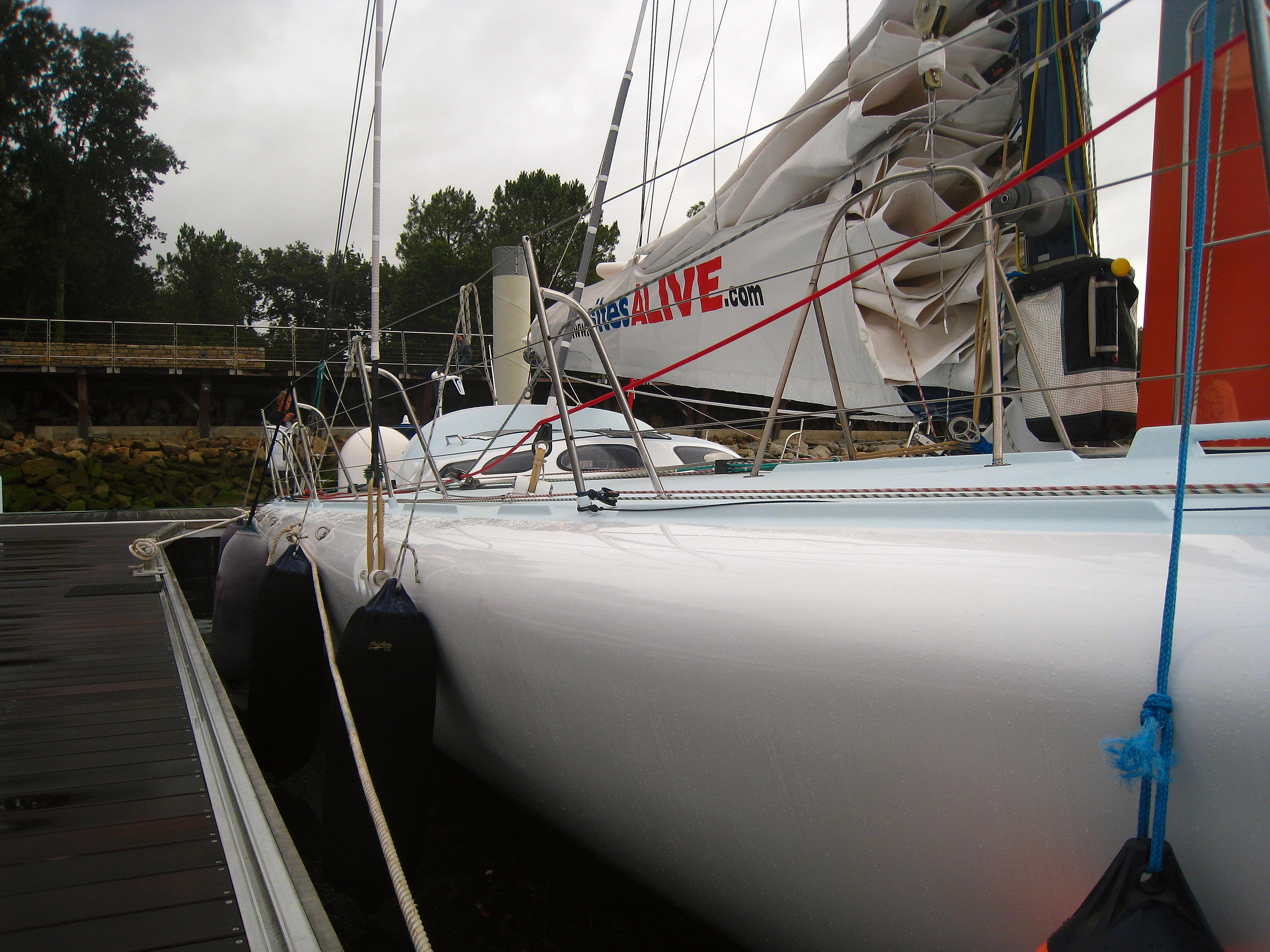

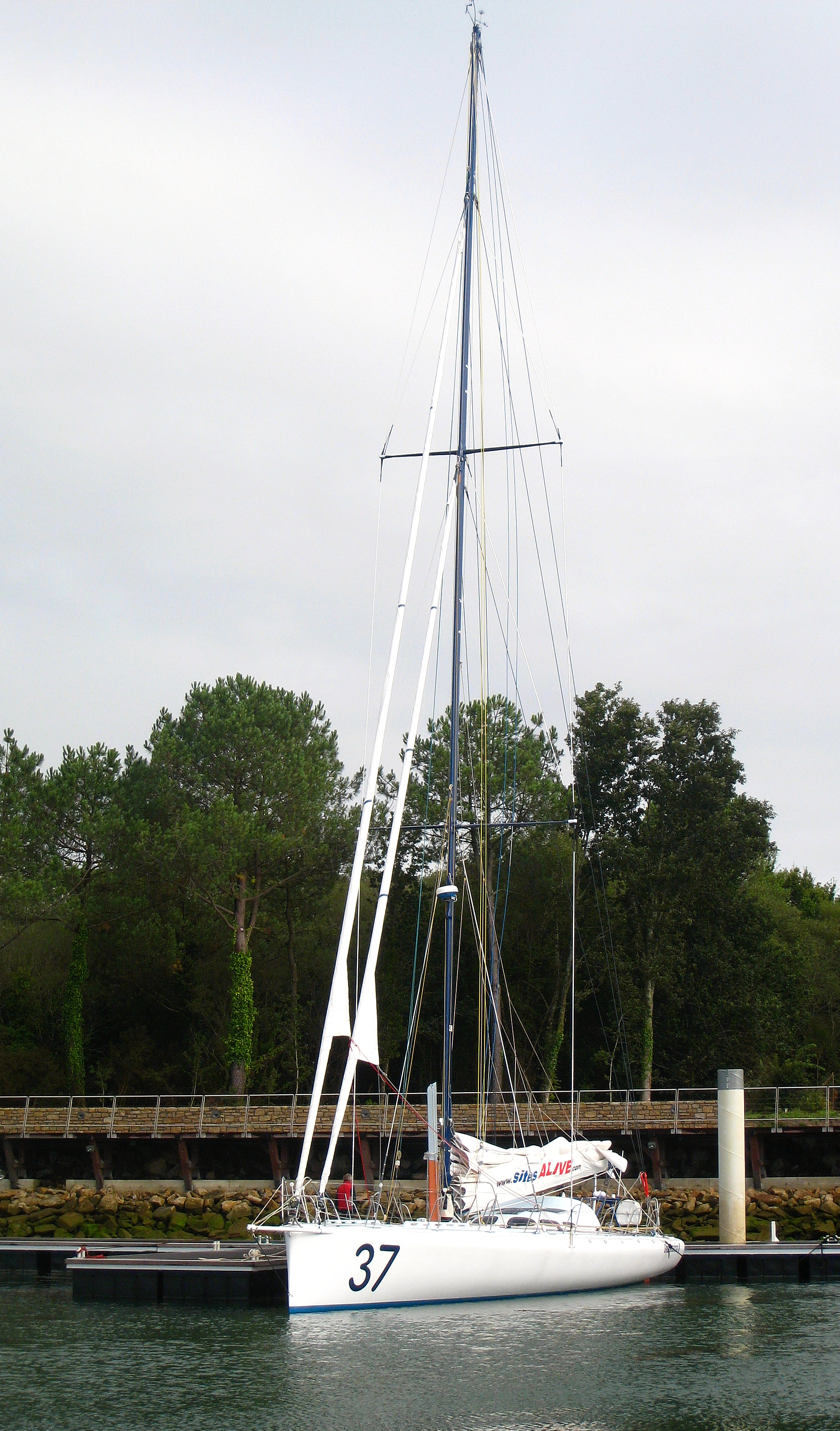

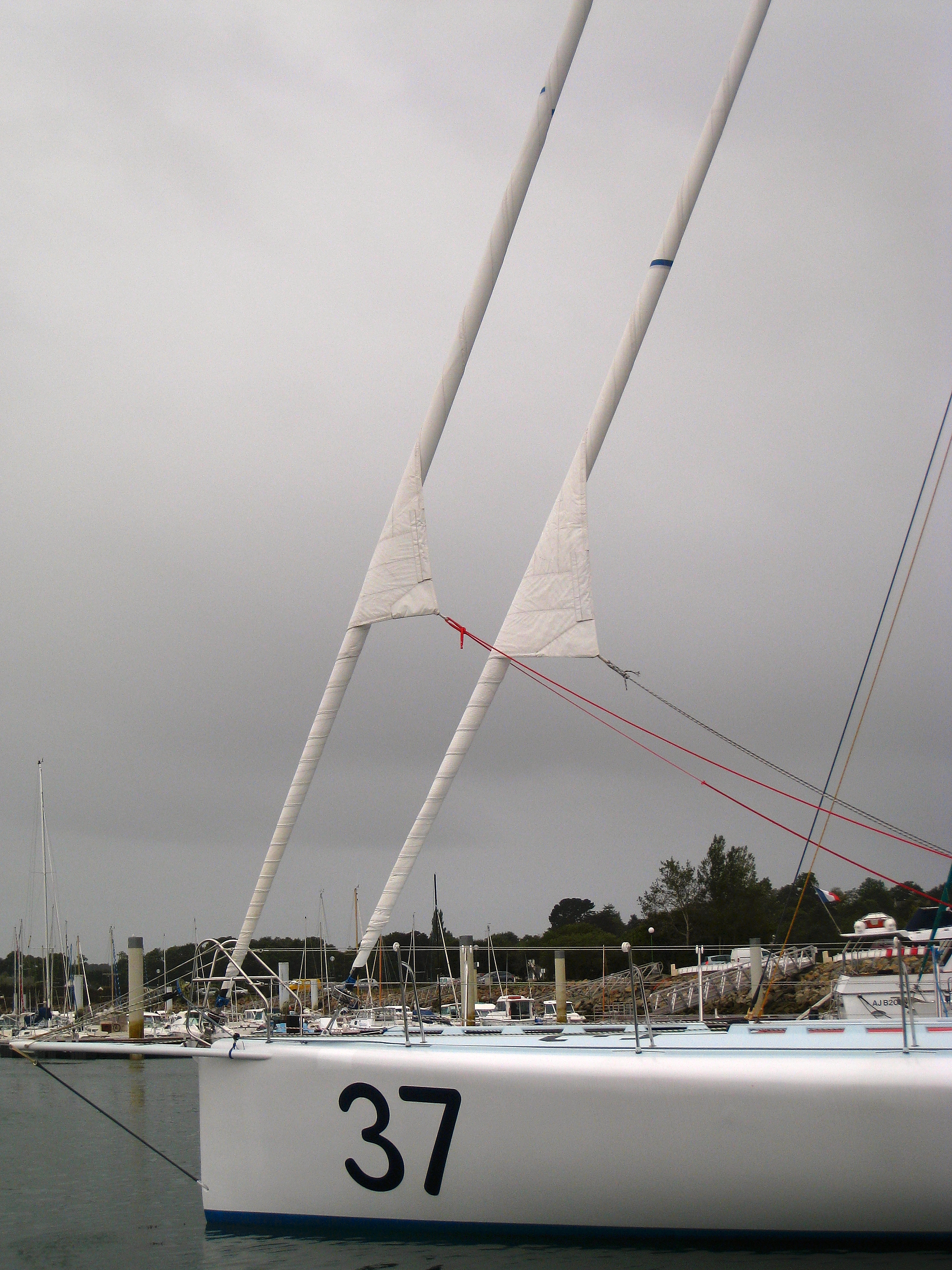

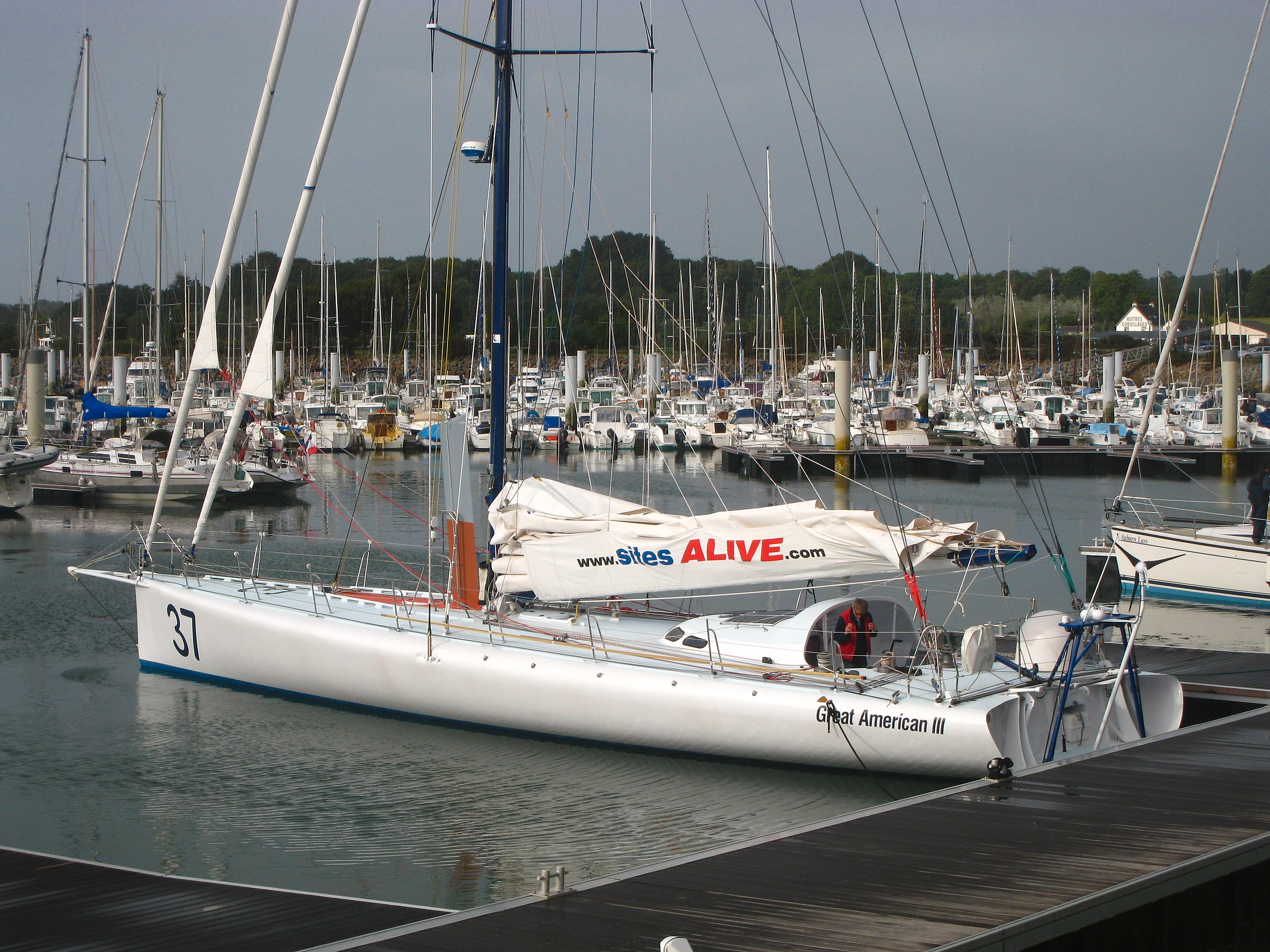
