= Mike Plant =

American single-handed yachtsman

- Plant in 1992

Personal information
- Born: Frank Michael Plant; November 21, 1950 Minneapolis, Minnesota, U.S.
- Died: 1992 (age 42) North Atlantic

Sailing career
- Sport: Sailing
- Classes: Open 50, Open 60

Mike Plant (November 21, 1950 – 1992) was an American single-handed yachtsman. He competed in the BOC Challenge and the Vendée Globe, a single-handed non-stop race around the world. After five years of single-handed sailing, he logged over 100,000 miles at sea and set the record for the fastest solo circumnavigation by an American, with a time of 135 days. In 1992, Plant was preparing to compete in his second Vendée Globe and fourth single-handed circumnavigation aboard Coyote, a powerful Open 60 sloop, and was lost at sea while delivering Coyote from New York Harbor to Les Sables-d'Olonne, France for the starting line. Coyote was found 32 days later, turtled, without the 8,400 lb lead bulb that should have been attached to the keel. At the time of his death, Plant was one of only six people to have completed three solo circumnavigations, joining Bertie Reed, Guy Bernardin, Jean-Luc Van Den Heede and Philippe Jeantot. and Jon Sanders. On September 6, 2002, Plant was inducted into The Single-Handed Sailing Hall of Fame in Newport, Rhode Island.

Mike Plant was born in Minneapolis, Minnesota, on November 21, 1950, the third of Frank Plant Jr. and Mary Kennedy's five children. He spent his childhood in the Minneapolis suburb of Deephaven on the shores of Lake Minnetonka. At the age of 9, Plant began sailing X Boats at Minnetonka Yacht Club, and by the age of 14, aboard Lucky Strike, had twice won the Interlake Regatta, the biggest regatta in the area, in which the top five boats from each of the large lakes in Minnesota, Iowa and Wisconsin competed at the end of the summer. After many adventures in his 20s, including trekking the length of South America (12,000 miles), Plant moved to Jamestown, Rhode Island, where he would later find his passion for single-handed sailing.

== Sailing achievements ==
- 1985/1986: Built Airco Distributor, an Open 50 sloop designed by Rodger Martin. Airco Distributor has completed 15 transatlantic trips and three BOC Challenges (Mike Plant; Josh Hall; Niah Vaughan) and as of 2013 had been preparing for her fourth solo-circumnavigation under Mark Taylor
- 1986/1987: Won the BOC Challenge (Class II – Open 50) aboard Airco Distributor, his first solo ocean race, with a time of 157 days
- 1989: Competed in the first Vendée Globe aboard Duracell, an Open 60 sloop built by Plant and designed by Rodger Martin. Although eliminated from the race after receiving help to rescue his boat after it ran aground in Perseverance Harbour at Campbell Island, New Zealand, Plant still set a record for the fastest American to sail single-handed around the world with a time of 135 days, bettering Dodge Morgan's time of 150 days set in 1985 aboard his 60-foot cutter, American Promise.
  - Plant's disqualification from the 1989 Vendée Globe transpired when a $5 part on Duracell's rigging was damaged in the Pacific Ocean. Plant sailed 36 hours straight until he was able to anchor in Perseverance Harbour at Campbell Island, New Zealand. Once anchored, a storm caught him and began pushing Duracell toward a rocky shore’s certain destruction. On the island, four meteorologists saw the racer’s plight and motored out in their boat as the windspeed slowly increased. To save his boat with its dragging anchor, Plant had to accept the tow, but he knew that the outside assistance would disqualify him. The meteorologists suggested to Mike that he simply continue the race. They vowed eternal silence. No one would know. "Except I would," Mike answered. Plant radioed the race committee that he had accepted outside help and that he would continue the race, though disqualified. He unofficially crossed the finish line in seventh place. Mike lost the race, but to the admiring French, he emerged a real hero. His determination and honesty did not go unnoticed: 25,000 people lined the breakwater in Les Sables-d'Olonne to give him a rousing hero’s welcome. Mike was the only American in the race. Herb McCormick, editor of Cruising World, and the Boating Editor of the New York Times wrote: "The tens of thousands of French men and women who greeted him at the finish understood something that largely was missed in this country. By forging on, by completing what he’d set out to do, by showing the highest respect for his competitors in a wonderful act of sportsmanship, Mike was as much a winner as the sailors who’d officially crossed the finish line."
  - Plant's record as the fastest American to sail single-handed around the world stood until the 1994/95 BOC Challenge when Steve Pettengill, sailing Hunter's Child, bested the time with a circumnavigation in 128 days. Bruce Schwab later broke this record, finishing the 2005 Vendée Globe with a time of 109 days nonstop.
- 1990/1991: Finished 4th overall in the BOC Challenge, setting the highest mark in a solo-sailing event for an American. Plant became one of only five people to complete three solo-circumnavigations
- 2002: Inducted to The Single-Handed Sailors' Hall of Fame

== Documentary film ==
A feature-length documentary film about Mike Plant's life was released worldwide in October 2018. The film, entitled COYOTE: The Mike Plant Story, was directed by Plant's nephew, Thomas Simmons. Notable characters in the film include celebrated sailors, Ken Read and Philippe Jeantot, Executive Editor of Cruising World and maritime author, Herb McCormick, and members of the Plant family.

== Mike Plant Memorial Fund ==
After his death, the Mike Plant Memorial Fund was created at Wayzata Sailing [né Wayzata Community Sailing Center], located on Lake Minnetonka in Wayzata, Minnesota, to provide sailing experiences for children who would not otherwise have the opportunity to sail. Scholarships are available through the fund.

== Wayzata Sailing & Mike Plant Community Boathouse ==
In June 2019, Wayzata Sailing (a nonprofit community sailing center), located on Lake Minnetonka, opened its new building named the Mike Plant Community Boathouse. Initially joining Wayzata Sailing as a leader of scholarship programming, Mike's mother Mary Plant became a tireless supporter of its broader programming and mission to create lake access. Originally the building was intended to be named for her volunteerism in her son's name; however, at Mary's request the building was named for Mike. His story is in integral part of Wayzata Sailing's mission – showing the power and connection that sailing can provide us, while giving us both the direction and freedom we seek in life. Mike's mother Mary passed late in 2019 but was able to celebrate the opening of the building with 4 generations of the Plant family in attendance.
