= Voortrekkers (disambiguation) =

Voortrekkers were Dutch-speaking settlers in South Africa who migrated eastward as part of the Great Trek.

Voortrekkers may also refer to:

- Voortrekker (yacht), a racing yacht
- Voortrekkers (youth organisation), a youth organisation
- Voortrekker High School (disambiguation)
- "The Voortrekkers", a short story in The Dark Between the Stars by Poul Anderson
