= Coyote: The Mike Plant Story =

COYOTE: The Mike Plant Story
- Official Film Poster
- Directed by: Thomas Simmons
- Produced by: Ryan Lynch, Matthew Davis Walker
- Starring: Mike Plant (Archival); Philippe Jeantot; Ken Read; Herb McCormick
- Cinematography: Johnny Decesare
- Music by: Jeff Victor; Tony Braasch
- Release date: July 13, 2017
- Running time: 106 minutes
- Country: United States
- Language: English

COYOTE: The Mike Plant Story is a 2017 American documentary film that depicts the life of American single-handed yachtsman, Mike Plant. The film was directed by Plant's nephew, Thomas Simmons, and produced by Ryan Lynch and Matthew Davis Walker.

The film focuses on Plant's professional sailing career, notably his successful campaigns in single-handed races around the world: the BOC Challenge and the Vendée Globe. From his debut and underdog victory in the 1986-87 BOC Challenge to his death at sea in advance of the 1992 Vendée Globe, the film relies primarily on archival footage and present day interviews from figures close to Plant's life. The film also highlights Plant's path before his sailing career, including a solo trek of South America, his escape from Greek authorities on a drug trafficking charge and time in a Portuguese prison. Notable characters in the film include sailors Ken Read and Philippe Jeantot, Executive Editor of Cruising World, Herb McCormick, and members of the Plant family.

== Release ==
A special screening of COYOTE was held in Newport, Rhode Island on July 13, 2017 with newportFILM. COYOTE was an official selection of Twin Cities Film Fest in October 2017, where the film won the Audience Award for Best Documentary. COYOTE was also an official selection of the 2017 Napa Valley Film Festival, the 2017 Lunenburg Doc Fest, 2017 Camden International Film Festival Selects., Big Sky Documentary Film Festival, among others. Worldwide sailing publication, Sailing Anarchy, called the film "The Best Sailing Movie Ever." Sailing World said the film "Captures the spirit of [Mike Plant]... the quintessential American yachtsman." The film received worldwide digital distribution on October 2, 2018, and is currently available on major digital platforms, including Amazon and iTunes.
