= Minoru Saitō =

Japanese solo yachtsman

Minoru Saitō (斉藤 実; born 7 January 1934) is a Japanese solo yachtsman and one of the most notable veteran ocean sailboat racers in the world. He became the oldest person at age 77 to do a solo circumnavigation of the globe. He has successfully made eight solo circumnavigations.

On 16 October 2004, Saitō left Japan on his yacht Shuten-dohji II (named after Shuten-dōji, a mythical demon who lived in the 10th century (it can also be read in English as "Drunkard's Child") and returned 233 days later to complete his 7th circumnavigation, non-stop. He finished his 8th solo circumnavigation, this time the "wrong way around," on 17 September 2011, after 1,080 days. He was 77 years old on completion.

== Biography ==
Saitō was born in Asakusa, Tokyo. He has participated three times in the most prestigious and grueling race in the sailing world, the single-handed, around-the-globe competition originally called the BOC Challenge, then Around Alone, and renamed the Velux 5 Oceans Race which commenced in 2006. The races are run in legs, with stop-overs for rest and repair in several countries along the way.

In his continuing career, Saitō has become the most experienced blue-water yachtsman from Japan with transoceanic voyages totaling more than 265,000 nautical miles (491,000 km) — almost exactly the distance to the Moon. He has started and finished eight solo circumnavigations of the Earth, the seventh one non-stop, achieving several international honors and world records.

In January 2007, Saitō was named the recipient of the highly vaunted 2006 Blue Water Medal awarded to one outstanding sailor each year by the Cruising Club of America. This recognition is considered the top international award for adventure sailing. In his achievements, he joins such solo sailing luminaries as Joshua Slocum (1844-1909); Sir Robin Knox-Johnston (1939-); Mike Plant (1950-1992); and Isabelle Autissier (1956-).

In January 2012, Saitō was named recipient of the Juan Sebastian del Cano Award, given by the 45,000-member United States Power Squadrons. The award is named for the navigator who finished the first-ever circumnavigation of the world led by Ferdinand Magellan in 1522.

Saitō was cited for successfully completing his 8th solo circumnavigation at age 77, an international record, as well as for his nearly 40-year sailing career that includes a non-stop solo circumnavigation in 2005 at age 71. It was only the second time the award to honor adventure boating has been presented by the organization.

== The 8th solo circumnavigation – the "wrong way around" ==
While most sailing circumnavigations follow a west-to-east route, some sailors attempt westwards circumnavigation—often termed the "wrong way around"— against prevailing winds, currents, and waves. This route places significant stress on the vessel and crew; solo sailors may experience extended periods with little sleep during difficult conditions.

The voyage started with an October 2008 departure from Yokohama, and entailed a westward circumnavigation of 26,500 nautical miles (49,100 km), and expected arrival back in Yokohama in the spring of 2010, after 6 months. Instead, it took almost 3 years for him to successfully complete the circumnavigation.

Saitō's vessel encountered a number of problems. He stopped for repair in Sydney, Australia in November 2008, in Fremantle, Australia in December and in Cape Town, S.Africa in February. He was disabled with rudder problems at Cape Horn, Chile in April, 2009. He was towed to the world's southernmost city, Punta Arenas, Chile, where he over-wintered and carried out repairs. A second attempt around the Horn was successful, but sail and engine problems forced him to return to Punta Arenas, where he again attended to repairs. He restarted the circumnavigation in late January 2010. He still had engine problems and stopped at Valdivia, Chile in February–March 2010 for repair. He then made a long stop in Honolulu, USA (June 2010-May 2011) and shorter stops in Galapagos, Ecuador and Ogasawara, Japan. He finished in Yokohama on 17 September 2011, 1,080 days after his departure.
