= IMOCA 60 PRB (1996) =

Sailboat

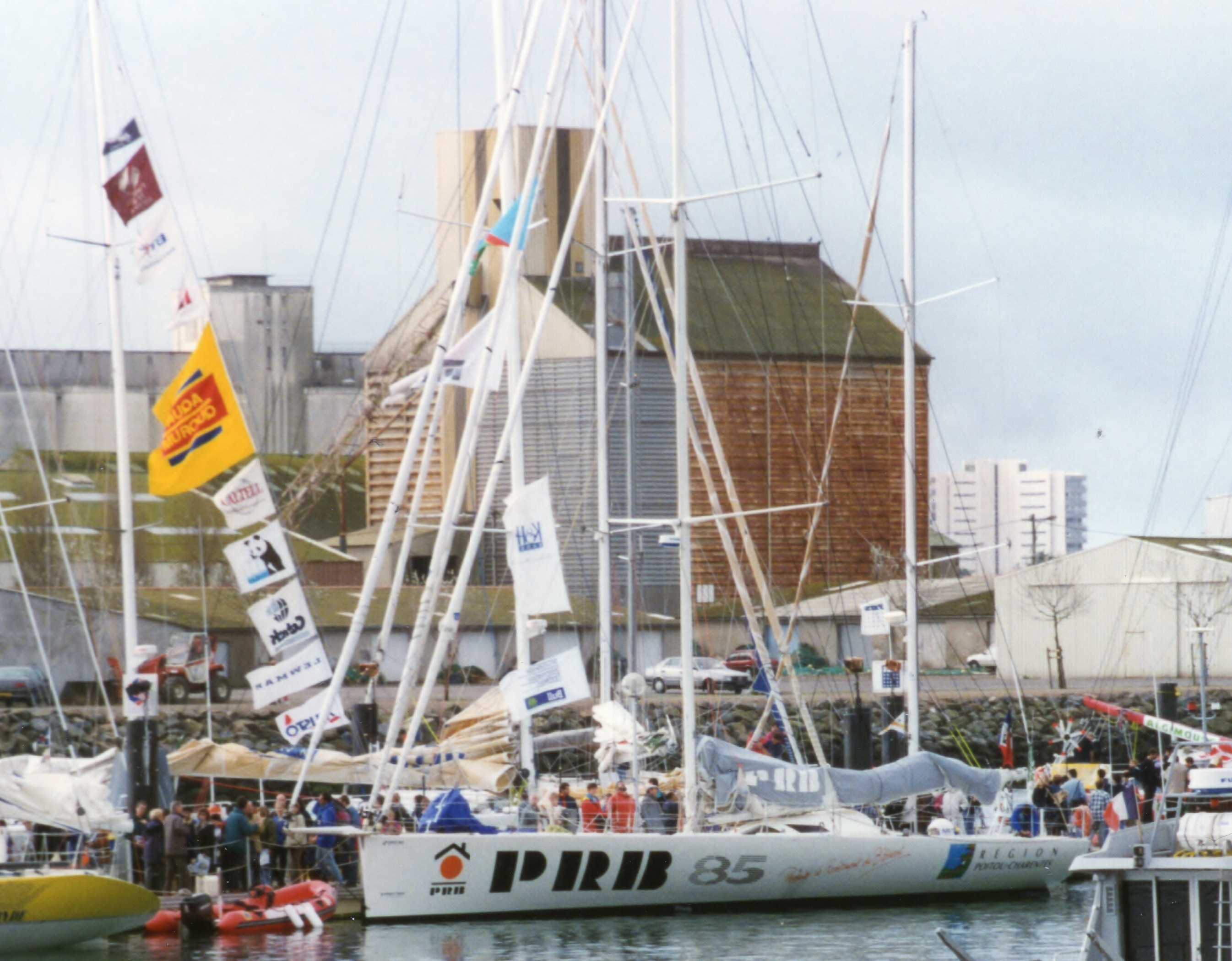

Development
- Designer: Finot-Conq
- Year: 15 July 1996

Hull
- Hull weight: Carbon Sandwich

Hull appendages
- Keel: Canting Keel
- Ballast: Water Ballast
- Rudder: Twin Rudders

Rig
- Rig type: Sloop

Racing
- Class association: IMOCA 60

The IMOCA 60 class yacht PRB, FRA 85 was designed by Finot-Cong and launched on 15 July 1996 after being built by Chantier Nautique Pinta based in La Rochelle, France. The boat capsized during the 1998 Around Alone Race and was lost although Isabelle Autissier was rescued by fellow competitor Italian G. Soldini. The boat capsized with the keel and keel bulb attached and was unable to right itself despite having a canting keel. Primarily because of the large deck area creating a very wide stable form, this led to the coachroof enlarging and moor camber on the deck to make the boats less stable upside down and the introduction of the righting test.

== Racing results ==
Pos	Year	Race	Class	Boat name	Skipper	Notes	Ref
Round the world races
DNF	1998	1998 Around Alone Race	IMOCA 60	PRB	Isabelle Autissier (FRA)		
DNF	1996	1996–1997 Vendée Globe	IMOCA 60	PRB	Isabelle Autissier (FRA)		
Transatlantic Races
Other Races
