= IMOCA 60 Fila =

Offshore Racing Sailboat

Development
- Designer: Finot-Conq
- Builder: CNB Chantier

Racing
- Class association: IMOCA 60

The IMOCA 60 class yacht Fila was designed by Finot-Conq and built by CNB in France. It was launched in 1997 and won the Around Alone race in 1998, just one year later.

== Racing results ==
Pos	Year	Race	Class	Boat name	Skipper	Notes	Ref
Round the world races
4 / 7	2006	Velux 5 Oceans Race	IMOCA 60	SAGA INSURANCE	Sir Robin Knox-Johnston (GBR)	159d 13h	
1	1998	1998 The Around Alone	IMOCA 60	Fila	Giovanni Soldini (ITA)	116 days	
Transatlantic Races
3 / 30	2014	Route du Rhum	IMOCA 60	GREY POWER, GBR 300X	Sir Robin Knox-Johnston (GBR)	20d 07h 52m	
9 / 17	2003	Transat Jacques Vabre	IMOCA 60	LOIRE ATLANTIQUE 44	François Robert (FRA); Antoine Koch (FRA)	4d 05h	
5 / 12	2003	Route du Rhum	IMOCA 60	L'HEAUTONTIMOROUMENOS 44	Antoine Koch (FRA)	17d 13h	
6 / 12	2001	Transat Jacques Vabre	IMOCA 60	Fila	Massimo Rufini (ITA); Bruno Laurent (ITA)	17d 03h 23m	
Other Races
