= IMOCA 60 Whirlpool 2 =

Round the World Racing Yacht

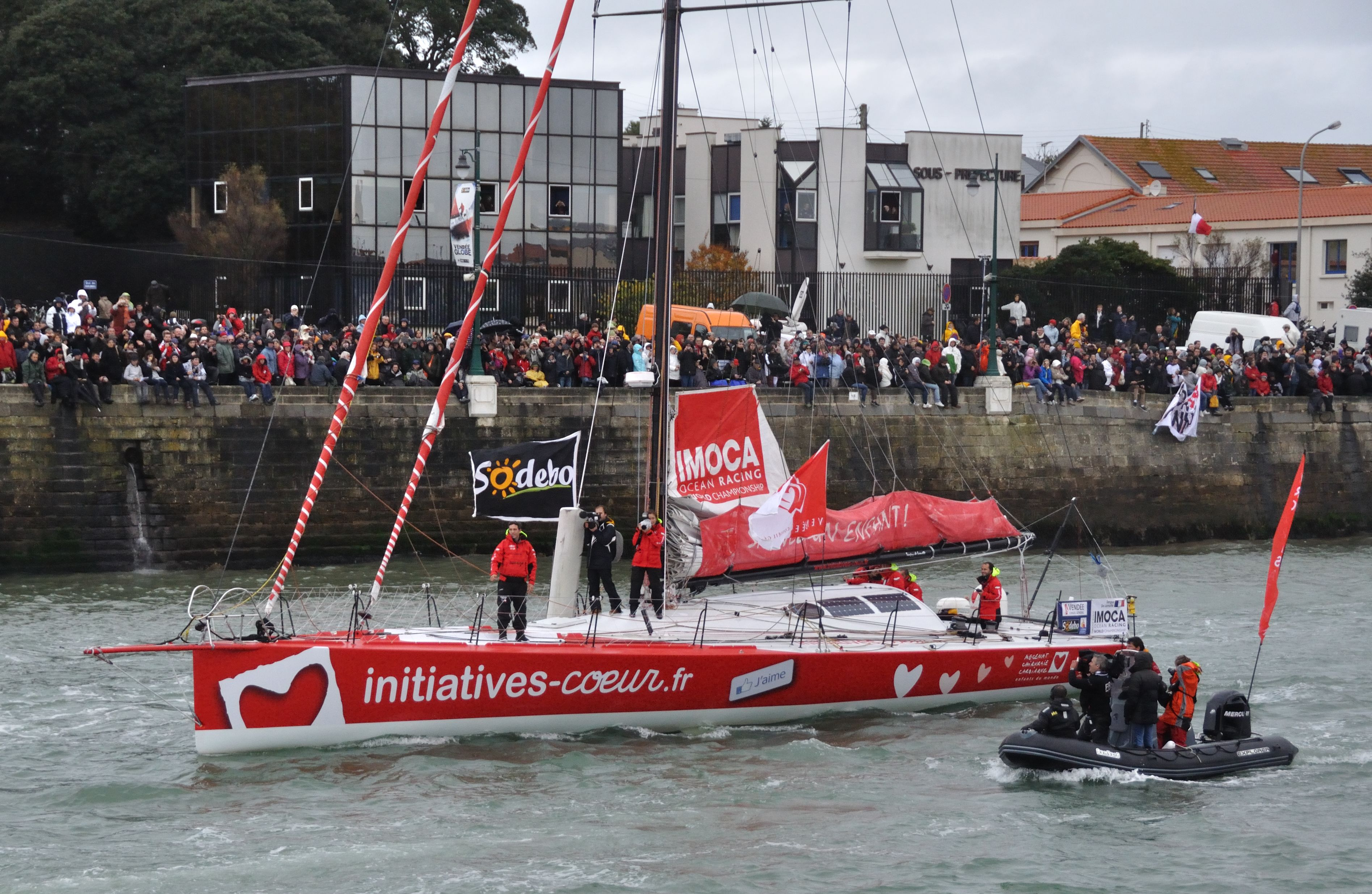

Development
- Designer: Marc Lombard Yacht Design Group, Marc Lombard
- Year: 1 February 1998
- Builder: Mag France

The IMOCA 60 class yacht Whirlpool-Europe 2 was designed by Marc Lombard and launched in the August 1998 after being built Mag in France.

== Racing results ==
Pos	Year	Race	Class	Boat name	Skipper	Notes	Ref
Round the world races
24 / 33	2021	2020–2021 Vendée Globe	IMOCA 60	TSE - 4MyPlanet, FRA	Alexia Barrier (FRA)	111d 17h 03m	
15 / 29	2017	2016–2017 Vendée Globe	IMOCA 60	Famille Mary – Etamine du Lys, FRA 72	Romain Attanasio (FRA)	109d 22h 04m	
10 / 20	2013	2012–2013 Vendée Globe	IMOCA 60	Initiatives-Coeur (1), 72	Tanguy de Lamotte (FRA)	98d 21h 56m	
1 / 5	2010	Velux 5 Oceans Race	Eco 60	Le Pingouin	Brad Van Liew (USA)		
DNF	2005	2004–2005 Vendée Globe	IMOCA 60	PRO-FORM, FRA 17	Marc Thiercelin (FRA)		
3 / 6	2002	Around Alone Race	IMOCA 60	TISCALI GLOBAL CHALLENGE	Simone Bianchetti (ITA)		
DNF	2001	2000–2001 Vendée Globe	IMOCA 60	Whirlpool	Catherine Chabaud (FRA)		
Transatlantic Races
Other Races
