= Race stage =

Cycling race contested over multiple days

A race stage or leg is a unit of a race that has been divided in several parts. Overall victory of the race is determined by a measure of time or points across every stage. The division of races into stages allows competitors to cover more distance.

In cycling, long races such as the Tour de France, Absa Cape Epic or the Giro d'Italia are known for their stages of one day each. In long-distance boat sailing events such as the Velux 5 Oceans Race, stages are of several weeks duration each, where the competitors are racing continuously day and night. In bicycling and running events, a race with stages is known as a stage race. These are distinguished from multiday races in ultramarathons and adventure racing, which may or may not have formal stages.

== Bicycle race stage ==
In an ordinary stage of road bicycle racing, all riders start simultaneously and share the road. Riders are permitted to touch and to shelter behind each other. Riding in each other's slipstreams is crucial to race tactics: a lone rider has little chance of outracing a small group of riders who can take turns in the strenuous position at the front of the group. The majority of riders form a single large group, the "pack" (in French, the "peloton"), with attacking groups ahead of it and the occasional struggling rider dropping behind. In mountainous stages the peloton is likely to become fragmented, but in flat stages a split is rare.

Where a group of riders reach the finish line together, they do not race each other for a few seconds of improvement to their finishing time. There is a rule that if one rider finishes less than three seconds behind another then he is credited with the same finishing time as the first. This operates transitively, so when the peloton finishes together every rider in it gets the time of the rider at the front of the peloton, even though the peloton takes tens of seconds, and possibly even a couple of minutes, to cross the finish line.

Riders who crash within the last three kilometres of the stage are credited with the finishing time of the group that they were with when they crashed, if that is better than the time in which they actually finish. This avoids sprinters being penalized for accidents that do not accurately reflect their performance on the stage as a whole given that crashes in the final three kilometre can be huge pileups that are hard to avoid for a rider farther back in the peloton. A crashed sprinter inside the final three kilometres will not win the sprint, but avoids being penalised in the overall classification.

Normal stage rules change for individual time trials or team time trials, in which riders or teams race the course sperately, with each rider or team beind timed and receiving the exact time that they took for the race.

=== Stages in flat terrain ===
Ordinary stages can be further classified as "sprinters' stages" or "climbers' stages". The former tend to be raced on relatively flat terrain, which makes it difficult for small groups or individual cyclists to break away from the peloton—there are no big hills to slow it down. So more often than not, the entire peloton approaches the finish line en masse. Some teams are organized around a single specialized sprinter, and in the final kilometres of a sprint stage, these teams jockey for position at the front of the peloton. In the final few hundred metres, a succession of riders "lead out" their sprinter, riding very hard while he stays in their slipstream. Just before the line—200 metres away is about the maximum—the sprinter launches himself around his final lead-out man in an all-out effort for the line. Top speeds can be in excess of 72 km/h (about 45 mph). Sprint stages rarely result in big time differences between riders (see above), but contenders for the General Classification tend to stay near the front of the peloton to avoid crashes.

=== Mountain stages ===
Mountain stages, on the other hand, often do cause big splits in the finishing times, especially when the stage actually ends at the top of a mountain. (If the stage ends at the bottom of a mountain that has just been climbed, riders have the chance to descend aggressively and catch up to anyone who may have beaten them to the summit.) For this reason, the mountain stages are considered the deciding factor in most Tours, and are often attended by hundreds of thousands of spectators.

Mountains cause big splits in finishing times due to the simple laws of physics. Firstly, the slower speeds mean that the aerodynamic advantage gained by slipstreaming is much smaller. Furthermore, lighter riders generate more power per kilogram than heavier riders; thus, the sprinters and the rouleurs (all-around good cyclists), who tend to be a bit bigger, suffer on the climbs and lose much time—40 minutes over a long stage is not unheard-of. Generally, these riders form a group known as the "bus" or "autobus" and ride at a steady pace to the finish. Their only goal is to cross the line within a certain limit—usually the stage winner's time plus 15% – or else they'll be disqualified from the race (at the discretion of the officials; on rare occasions a lead breakaway becomes so large that the entire peloton falls that far back and would normally be allowed to remain in the competition to avoid having only a small field still in competition).

Meanwhile, the lighter climbers hurl themselves up the slopes at a much higher speed. Usually, the General Classification riders try to stay near the front group, and also try to keep a few teammates with them. These teammates are there to drive the pace—and hopefully "drop" the opposition riders—and to provide moral support to their leader. Typically, the leader will attack very hard when there are only a few kilometres to go, trying to put time into his main rivals. Gaps of two and even three minutes can be created over just a few kilometres by hard attacks.

==== Medium mountain stages ====
In larger stage races, some stages may be designated as "medium mountain", "hilly" or "intermediate" stages. These stages are more difficult than flat stages, but not as difficult as the mountain stages. They are often well-suited for a breakaway, when one or a few riders attacks the peloton and beats it to the finish line. Typically these stages are somewhere between flat and mountainous. Breakaway stages are where the rouleurs, the hard-working, all-around riders who make up the majority of most teams, get their chance to grab a moment in the spotlight: the climbers will want to save their energy for the mountains, and the sprinters are not built for hills. Occasionally, the distinction between medium mountain and mountain in stage classification, decided by race officials, can be controversial. The Giro d'Italia has had a reputation of labeling selective, very difficult stages as merely medium mountain.

=== Special rules ===
Most stage races have points classification (e.g. Points classification in the Tour de France), which tends to be contested by sprinters. Riders collect points for being one of the first to finish the stage and also for being one of the first three to finish an "intermediate" sprint. Sprinters also can get time bonuses, meaning that good sprinters may lead the general classification during the first few stages of a big multi-day event.

== NASCAR stage racing ==
In NASCAR racing, starting with the 2017 season, races in the top three national touring series are completed in three stages, four in the case of the NASCAR Cup Series's longest race, the Coca-Cola 600. At the end of each stage, a green and white checkered flag is deployed, followed by a caution period, where drivers may take pitstop. The top-10 finishers in each of the first two stages are awarded bonus championship points. The points earned are added to a driver/owner's regular season points total, while the winner of the stage receives an additional point that can be carried into the NASCAR playoffs. The stage lengths vary by track, but the first two stages usually combine to equal about half of the race. The final stage (which still pays out the most championship points) usually equals the other half. The first driver to win a National Series race under the stage race format was GMS Racing Camping World Truck Series driver Kaz Grala who won the season opener at Daytona International Speedway in February 2017 after holding off Austin Wayne Self.

In August 2026, NASCAR modified the stage rules to avoid consecutive caution periods. If a natural caution occurs within the 10 laps before the scheduled end, the stage ends immediately and the caution counts as the stage break. The rule does not apply to the final stage, where the overtime rules remain.

== Round-the-world sailing ==
Round-the-world sailing races are sometimes held over stages. Notable examples are the Volvo Ocean Race, Velux 5 Oceans Race, Clipper Round the World Yacht Race and Global Challenge.
