= Bruce Dalling =

South African sailor

Bruce Tweeddale Dalling (16 August 1938 – 7 July 2008) was a Springbok South African yachtsman, also advocate and farmer, best known for taking second place on elapsed time and first on corrected time for the monohull award in the 1968 Observer Single-Handed Trans-Atlantic Race.

== Early life, education, and career ==
Dalling was born in Johannesburg to William Tweeddale Dalling, a mining captain, and his wife Kathleen. He was educated at St. John's College, Johannesburg, after which he went to sea and then joined the Hong Kong Police for two years, becoming an inspector and serving as commanding officer of a "penetration patrol" unit. While living in Hong Kong, he took up yachting and participated in major races including the Sydney to Hobart Yacht Race. After returning to South Africa he was a crew member on the South African yacht Stormvogel.

He studied for an agricultural degree at the University of Natal and became a lecturer in agriculture. He then studied law and became an advocate during the mid-1970s, practising mainly in Pietermaritzburg and Durban. He gave up due to ill health in 1982 and then turned to lecturing at the University of Natal. He went farming in Howick, KwaZulu-Natal, but still served as an assessor in high court cases.

He owned his own aircraft, a Cessna 210 Centurion named "Charlie" and participated in sky-diving and was instrumental in establishing the Pietermaritzburg Parachute Club.

== The Yacht Voortrekker ==
For the 1968 Observer Single-Handed Trans-Atlantic Race, Dalling was selected out of 40 applicants to skipper the yacht Voortrekker, a 50 ft ketch designed by the naval architect, Ricus van de Stadt, and built of wood-composite construction by Thesens of Knysna for the Springbok Ocean Racing Trust and sponsored by the Rembrandt Group of Companies.

Voortrekker's strength lay in her planking, consisting of three layers of Malaysian Meranti glued together with a fibreglass coat for binding and waterproofing and weighed 6½ tons, including the keel. She was half the weight of any equivalent-sized racing yacht. She was equipped with a sparsely designed two bunk cabin. Perhaps the only aspect where the minimalist approach was not adopted was to the range and ability of the navigational equipment. She turned out to be one of the fastest racing yachts in her class.

Sea trials were conducted in Table Bay and False Bay before she was sailed from Cape Town to Plymouth for the 1968 OSTAR.

After the race Voortrekker returned from the USA to South Africa on board the Safmarine freighter SA Weltevreden. She was hoisted by crane off the special cradle that had been assembled for her transportation across the Atlantic and lowered into the water at Cape Town docks. After the mast had been stepped, Bruce sailed her along the Atlantic seaboard for ninety minutes where many fans had assembled to welcome the sailor home. Voortrekker then docked at Granger Bay, where Vice-Admiral Hugo Biermann, Dr Anton Rupert – head of the Rembrandt Group that underwrote the venture and Cape Town mayor, Mr G.E. Ferry along with other dignitaries gave him a hero's welcome.

== The 1968 OSTAR ==
Thirty five yachts entered the race of which thirteen were multihulls. The race started on 1 June departing from Plymouth England for Newport, Rhode Island.

The race was by now acquiring a reputation for pushing forward the technology of ocean sailing, and the 1968 edition featured the first ever use of computer-based weather routing. A far cry from today's laptop-laden yachts, this consisted of a land-based mainframe computer, the English Electric KDF9, linked by radio to 25-year-old school teacher Geoffrey Williams in his boat Sir Thomas Lipton. Although outside private routing advice of this kind is no longer permitted in most "unassisted" races, it is now routine for ocean sailors to do similar analyses using their on-board computers to process public weather information.

Williams created another story by his use of the "shortcut" through the Nantucket Shoal. This dangerous route was supposed to be illegal, but due to an error the race instructions required skippers only to keep south of Nantucket, instead of Nantucket Light. Williams successfully navigated the treacherous route in a gale. Gales were a major feature of the race, with a large storm on the 11th – 12 June, and Hurricane Brenda, both contributing to the large number of retired and abandoned boats; Dalling described this storm as one of the worst he had ever encountered and one that he would remember for a long time. Water 4 ft deep washed over the deck and flooded his electric generator, when it came into the ketch through an exhaust pipe on the deck. As a result he was without power, explaining his radio absence during a large part of the race. Voortrekker was driven back 60 miles during the storm and broke her main boom, necessitating a jury rig. One casualty was Éric Tabarly, aboard his new trimaran Pen Duick IV.

Although won by a monohull, this race saw the multihulls firmly established on the scene. The multihulls were led by the controversial proa Cheers; many observers felt that a proa was entirely unsuitable for ocean sailing, but she made a fast time along the Azores route

The race was won by Williams on Sir Thomas Lipton in 25 days 20 hours 33 min. However he had a 12-hour penalty for incorrect procedure at the start. Dalling completed the race in 26 days 13 hours 42 min, earning himself a place in yachting history.

== Personal life ==
In 1971, Dalling married Carol Joy Allan. They had three children- a son, William, who is a veterinarian in Namibia, and two daughters, Kerry and Cathy.
