= Alan Nebauer =

Australian yachtsman

- Born: Australia
- Occupations: Sailor and author
- Known for: BOC Challenge 1994 participation, rescue of competitor Josh Hall

Alan Nebauer is an Australian yachtsman who competed in the single-handed round-the-world 1994–95 BOC Challenge race aboard the yacht Newcastle Australia. Nebauer won two awards for his seamanship during the race, one of them for rescuing his British competitor Josh Hall, whose vessel foundered during the first leg from Charleston to Cape Town.

Nebauer wrote a book about his adventures in the race (Against All Odds: around alone in the BOC challenge. McGraw Hill. 1996. ISBN 978-0-07-470331-1.) and a documentary film was also produced.

Alan Nebauer and his wife, Cindy, currently run a charter business in Jervis Bay, Australia. Alan also remains involved with various yachting projects as a consultant and contract skipper.
