= Simone Bianchetti =

Italian offshore sailor and navigator

Personal information
- Born: 20 February 1968 Cervia, Italy
- Died: 28 June 2003 (aged 35) Savona, Italy

Sailing career
- Sport: Sailing

Simone Bianchetti (20 February 1968 – 28 June 2003) was an Italian offshore sailor, competing in the BOC Challenge and the Vendée Globe.

== Biography ==
Bianchetti was born 20 February 1968 in Cervia. He was as the son of Pilade and Maria. He graduated from the Cesenatico Naval Institute and then obtained the title of long-term captain at the "Giorgio Cini" naval college in Venice. He served in the Italian Navy for two years, then devoted himself to sailing.

In 1994, he took part in his first major solo regatta, the BOC Challenge on Town of Cervia in Class 2 (40 to 50-foot monohulls). He retired on the second stage in the Indian Ocean.

In 2001, he bought Aquitaine Innovations for the next Vendée Globe. With the boat, he finished fourth in the IMOCA class under the name Tiscali. Afterwards, he sold it to Patrick de Radiguès and turned to the boat of Catherine Chabaud, The Penguin, which he renamed Tiscali because he kept the same sponsor. He participated in Around Alone, in which he finished in third place. Coincidentally, Patrick de Radiguès competed in the same competition on Simone's old boat, but had less luck and had to give up.

On 28 June 2003, he died of a ruptured aneurysm while on his boat Tiscali in the port of Savona.

== Sailing career highlights ==
Year	Pos	Race	Class	Boat name	Notes	Ref.
Round-the-world races
2003	3	Around Alone Race	IMOCA 60	Tiscali		
2001	15	2000-2001 Vendee Globe	IMOCA 60	Wind Telecommunicazioni		
1994	DNF	BOC Challenge	IMOCA 50	Town of Cervia		
Trans-ocean races
1998	26	Route du Rhum		Italia Telecom TNT		
1996	2	Single-Handed Trans-Atlantic Race	Mono 45 ft	Merit Cup		
1996		Transat Québec–Saint-Malo				
1995	10	Mini Transat Race	Mini Transat 6.50	Vismara Kidogo		
Other races
2001	4	Fastnet Race	IMOCA 60	Tiscali		

== Publications ==
- Bianchetti, Simone (2000). Poemetti furiosi di un navigatore (in Italian). Florence: Olimpia.
- Bianchetti, Simone; Pozzo, Fabio (2003). I colori dell'oceano (in Italian). Milan: Longanesi & Cie. ISBN 9788830420885.
