= Velux 5 Oceans Race =

Single-handed yacht race

The Velux 5 Oceans Race was a round-the-world single-handed yacht race, sailed in stages, managed by Clipper Ventures since 2000. Its most recent name comes from its main sponsor Velux. Originally known as the BOC Challenge, for the title sponsor BOC, the first edition was in 1982. In the late 1990s the race was renamed the Around Alone. The 2010-11 race was the last to take place and attracted just five entries. The event has not been held since.

== Overview ==
The race was established in 1982 as the BOC Challenge, with main sponsorship from BOC. The race was inspired by the Golden Globe Race, which was the first single-handed round-the-world yacht race. Although the Golden Globe was a non-stop race, the BOC Challenge concept was for a single-handed round-the-world race, to be run in stages (in contrast to the Vendée Globe, which is non-stop). As the longest single-handed event in the world, it was regarded as one of sailing's ultimate challenges.

The race was run every four years. The first edition was won by Philippe Jeantot, who won all four legs of the race with an overall elapsed time of just over 159 days. In 1998, the race was renamed the Around Alone; for 2006, it is known as the Velux 5 Oceans Race.

1982-1983 Route

1990-1991 Route

1994-1995 Route

1998-1999 Route

2002 Route

2006-2007 Route

2010-2011 Route

== Past results ==
=== The BOC Challenge 1982–83 ===
Raced over four legs; Newport, Rhode Island — Cape Town — Sydney — Rio de Janeiro — Newport. Two classes of boat were entered: Class 1, 45–56 feet (13.7–17.1 m); and Class 2, 32–44 feet (9.7–13.4 m).

Results:

Skipper	Boat	Nationality	Time
Class 1: 45 to 56 feet
Philippe Jeantot	Credit Agricole	France	159 days
Bertie Reed	Altech Voortrekker	South Africa	170 days
Richard Broadhead	Perseverance of Medina	United Kingdom	192 days
Neville Gosson	Leda Pier One	Australia	202 days
Desmond Hampton	Gipsy Moth V	United Kingdom	Wrecked
Tony Lush	Lady Pepperell	United States	Sunk Leg 2
Paul Rogers	Spirit of Pentax	United Kingdom	Retired Leg 1
Dave White	Gladiator	United States	Retired Leg 1
Class 2: 32 to 44 feet
Yukoh Tada	Koden Okera V	Japan	207 days
Francis Stokes	Mooneshine	United States	209 days
Richard Konkolski	Nike III	United States	213 days
Guy Bernadin	Ratso II	France	221 days
Dan Byrne	Fantasy	United States	228 days
Richard McBride	City of Dunedin	New Zealand	264 days
Jacques de Roux	Skoiern III	France	Sunk Leg 3
Greg Coles	Datsun Skyline	New Zealand	Retired Leg 1
Thomas Lindholm	Driftwood	United States	Retired Leg 1

=== The BOC Challenge 1986–87 ===
Raced over four legs; Newport, Rhode Island — Cape Town — Sydney — Rio de Janeiro — Newport. Two classes of boat were entered: Class 1, 50–60 feet (15.2–18.3 m); and Class 2, 40–50 feet (12.2–15.2 m). New safety rules were introduced for this race, including compulsory watertight bulkheads and a simple stability check.

Results:

Skipper	Boat	Nationality	Time
Class 1: 50 to 60 feet
Philippe Jeantot	Credit Agricole	France	134 days
Titouan Lamazou	Ecureuil	France	137 days
Jean-Y Terlain	UAP	France	146 days
Guy Bernadin	Biscuit Lu	France	146 days
John Martin	Tuna Marine	South Africa	147 days
Ian Kiernan	Triple M	Australia	156 days
Bertie Reed	Stabilo Boss	South Africa	163 days
Dave White	Legend Securities	United States	164 days
Richard McBride	Kiwi Express	New Zealand	Retired Leg 1
John Biddlecombe	ACI Crusader	Australia	Retired Leg 1
Warren Luhrs	Thursday's Child	United States	Retired Leg 2
Class 2: 40 to 50 feet
Mike Plant	Airco Distributor	United States	157 days
Jean-Luc Van Den Heede	Let's Go	France	161 days
Harry Harkimo	Belmont Finland	Finland	168 days
Hal Roth	American Flag	United States	171 days
Richard Konkolski	Declaration	United States	172 days
Pentti Salmi	Colt by Rettig	Finland	175 days
Mark Schrader	Lone Star	United States	175 days
John Hughes	Joseph Young	Canada	189 days
Dick Cross	Airforce	United States	Retired Leg 1
Eduardo Louro de Almeida	Miss Global	Brazil	Retired Leg 1
Mac Smith	Qualo	United States	Retired Leg 1
Takao Shimada	Madonna	Japan	Retired Leg 1
Harry Mitchell	Double Cross	United Kingdom	Retired Leg 3
Jacques de Roux	Skoiern IV	France	Lost at sea Leg 2

=== The BOC Challenge 1990–91 ===
The course was changed for this edition, although it was still divided into four legs: Newport, Rhode Island — Cape Town — Sydney — Punta del Este — Newport. Three classes of boat were entered: Class 1, 50–60 feet (15.2–18.3 m); Class 2, 40–50 feet (12.2–15.2 m); and a Corinthian class.

Results:

Skipper	Boat	Nationality	Time
Class 1: 50 to 60 feet
Christophe Auguin	Groupe Sceta	France	120 days
Alain Gautier	Generali Concorde	France	122 days
Philippe Jeantot	Credit Agricole IV	France	129 days
Mike Plant	Duracell	United States	132 days
Kanga Birtles	Jarkan Yacht Builders	Australia	135 days
Dave Adams	Innkeeper	Australia	136 days
Isabelle Autissier	Ecureuil Poitou Charantes	France	139 days
Bertie Reed	Grinaker	South Africa	140 days
Jose de Ugarte	BBV Expo '92	Spain	140 days
Nándor Fa	Alba Regia	Hungary	165 days
John Martin	Allied Bank	South Africa	Sank Leg 3
John Biddlecombe	Interox Crusader	Australia	Retired Leg 1
Enda O'Coineen	Kilcullen	Ireland	Retired Leg 1
Class 2: 40 to 50 feet
Yves Dupasquier	Servant IV	France	141 days
Don McIntyre	Buttercup	Australia	153 days
Josh Hall	New Spirit of Ipswich	United Kingdom	157 days
Jack Boye	Project City Kids	United States	158 days
Hal Roth	Sebago	United States	211 days
Yukoh Tada	Koden VIII	Japan	Retired Leg 2
Jane Weber	Tilley Endurable	Canada	Retired Leg 1
Corinthian class
Paul Thackaberry	Volcano	United States	180 days
Robin Davie	Global Exposure	United Kingdom	181 days
Minoru Saito	Shuten Dohji	Japan	197 days
William Gilmore	Zafu	United States	Retired Leg 1
Robert Hooke	Niihau 4	United States	Retired Leg 3

=== The BOC Challenge 1994–95 ===
The course was again changed for this edition, although it was still divided into four legs: Charleston, South Carolina — Cape Town — Sydney — Punta del Este — Charleston. Two classes of boat were entered: Class 1, 50–60 feet (15.2–18.3 m); and Class 2, 40–50 feet (12.2–15.2 m).

Results:

Skipper	Boat	Nationality	Time
Class 1: 50 to 60 feet
Christophe Auguin	Sceta-Calberson	France	121 days
Steve Pettengill	Hunters Child	United States	128 days
Jean-Luc Van Den Heede	Vendee Enterprises	France	129 days
David Scully	Coyote	United States	133 days
JJ Provoyeur	Novell S.Africa	South Africa	133 days
Arnet Taylor	Thursday's Child	United States	200 days
Josh Hall	Gartmore	United Kingdom	Sank Leg 1
Mark Gatehouse	QAB	United Kingdom	Retired Leg 1
Isabelle Autissier	Ecureuil Poitou-Charentes 2	France	Sank Leg 2
Class 2: 40 to 50 feet
Dave Adams	True Blue	Australia	131 days
Giovanni Soldini	Kodak	Italy	134 days
Niah Vaughan	Jimroda II	United Kingdom	166 days
Alan Nebauer	Newcastle Australia	Australia	181 days
Robin Davie	Cornwall	United Kingdom	197 days
Minoru Saito	Shuten Dohji II	Japan	223 days
Floyd Romak	Cardac 88	United States	Retired Leg 1
Neal Petersen	Protect our Sealife	South Africa	Retired Leg 2
Simone Bianchetti	Town of Cervia	Italy	Retired Leg 2
Nigel Rowe	Skycatcher	United Kingdom	Retired Leg 3
Harry Mitchell	Hornblower	United Kingdom	Lost at sea

=== The Around Alone, 1998 ===
The course was again changed for this edition, although it was still divided into four legs: Charleston, South Carolina — Cape Town — Auckland — Punta del Este — Charleston. Two classes of boat were entered: Class 1, 50–60 feet (15.2–18.3 m); and Class 2, 40–50 feet (12.2–15.2 m).

In this race Isabelle Autissier was rescued by fellow competitor Giovanni Soldini when her boat PRB capsized approximately 1,900 nautical miles (3,500 km) west of Cape Horn.

The results:

Skipper	Boat	Nationality	Time
Class 1: 50 to 60 feet
Giovanni Soldini	Fila	Italy	116 days
Marc Thiercelin	Somewhere	France	130 days
Josh Hall	Gartmore	United Kingdom	Dismasted Leg 3
Fyodor Konyukhov	Modern Unervisity For The Humanities	Russia	Retired Leg 2
Mike Golding	Group 4 Securitas	United Kingdom	Retired Leg 2
Isabelle Autissier	PRB (1)	France	Capsized Leg 3 rescued by Giovanni Soldini
Sebastian Reidl	Project Amazon	Canada	
Class 2: 40 to 50 feet
Jean Pierre Mouligne	Cray Valley	France	132 days
Michael Garside	Magellan Alpha	United Kingdom	138 days
Brad van Liew	Balance Bar	United States	150 days
Viktor Yazykov	Wind of Change	Russia	168 days
Neal Petersen	www.no-barriers.com	South Africa	195 days
Minoru Saito	Shuten Dohji II	Japan	203 days
Neil Hunter	Paladin II	Australia	216 days
Robin Davie	South Carolina	United States	Disqualified Leg 2
George Stricker	Rapscallion III	United States	Retired Leg 2

Viktor Yazykov is noted for performing surgery alone, at sea, on his elbow to drain a dangerous infection after injuring his elbow during the race. He emailed a doctor who provided instructions for his treatment

=== The Around Alone, 2002 ===
The course was again changed for this edition, this time spanning five legs: Newport, Rhode Island/New York — Brixham, Devon — Cape Town — Tauranga — Salvador, Brazil — Newport. Although the race technically started and ended in Newport, it was preceded by a "prologue race", in which the boats with crews of up to five raced to New York, to take part in Sail for America, a major sailing event marking the first anniversary of the September 11, 2001 attacks. The main Around Alone event started from New York, and finished back in Newport.

Three classes of boat were entered: Class 1, IMOCA Open 60; Class 2, IMOCA Open 50; and Class 3, IMOCA Open 40.

Results:

Skipper	Boat	Nationality	Time
Class 1: IMOCA Open 60
Bernard Stamm	Bobst Group - Armor Lux	Switzerland	49 pts 115 days
Thierry Dubois	Solidaires	France	45 pts 118 days
Simone Bianchetti	Tiscali	Italy	35 pts 159 days
Emma Richards	Pindar	United Kingdom	33 pts 131 days
Bruce Schwab	Ocean Planet	United States	30 pts 159 days
Patrick Radigues	Garnier	Belgium	Retired Leg 1
Graham Dalton	Hexagon HSBC	New Zealand	Retired Leg 3
Class 2: IMOCA Open 50
Brad van Liew	Tommy Hilfiger	United States	50 pts 148 days
Tim Kent	Everest Horizontal	United States	44 pts 169 days
John Dennis	Bayer Ascensia	Canada	Retired Leg 2
Class 3: IMOCA Open 40
Derek Hatfield	Spirit of Canada	Canada	37 pts 245 days
Kojiro Shiraishi	Spirit of Yukoh	Japan	36 pts 180 days
Alan Paris	BTC Velocity	Bermuda	30 pts 202 days

=== The Velux 5 Oceans 2006–07 ===
The 2006 edition covered a route of 30,140 nautical miles (55,820 km). The race started in Bilbao (Spain), on October 22, 2006, and finished there. There were only two stops, in Fremantle (Australia) and Norfolk (USA).

Skipper Name	Boat name	Nationality	Boat Type	Time
Bernard Stamm	Cheminées Poujoulat	Switzerland	Open 60	103 days
Kojiro Shiraishi	Spirit of Yukoh	Japan	Open 60	118 days
Unai Basurko	Pakea	Spain / Basque	Open 60	158 days
Sir Robin Knox-Johnston	SAGA Insurance	United Kingdom	Open 60	159 days
Graham Dalton	A Southern Man-AGD	New Zealand	Open 50	Finished Leg 2
Mike Golding	Ecover 3	United Kingdom	Open 60	Retired Leg 1
Alex Thomson	Hugo Boss (1)	United Kingdom	Open 60	Abandoned Leg 1

The race was open to monohull yachts conforming to the Open 50 and Open 60 class criteria. The Open classes are unrestricted in certain aspects but a box rule governs parameters such as overall length, draught, appendages and stability, as well as numerous other safety features.

The race took place in stages, with the skippers having the chance to rest and refit at each stop-over point. Different staging points have been used over the years; the races prior to the 1998 event were run in four legs, and the 1998 event in five legs. The 2006 edition had the longest stages of any edition to date, with just three legs:

From	To	Expected Start	Expected Finish	Length (nm)
Bilbao, Spain	Fremantle, Australia	October 22, 2006	Early December 2006	11,730
Fremantle, Australia	Norfolk, Virginia, USA	January 7, 2007	Mid March 2007	14,500
Norfolk, Virginia, USA	Bilbao, Spain	April 15, 2007	End of April 2007	3,910

The total length for the 2006 edition was 30,140 nautical miles (55,820 km).

=== The Velux 5 Oceans 2010–11 ===
The 2010 edition of the race started in La Rochelle (France), on October 17, 2010, and finished in the same port. Stopovers were Cape Town (South Africa), Wellington (New Zealand), Punta del Este (Uruguay), and Charleston, South Carolina (USA). The sailboats were all in the "Eco 60" class (Open 60 yachts built before 1 January 2003).

Skipper Name	Nationality	Boat name	Boat Type	Total Time	Overall Place	Overall points
Brad Van Liew	United States	Le Pingouin	Eco 60	118 days 10 hours 17 mins	1st	73
Zbigniew Gutkowski	Poland	Operon Racing	Eco 60	140 days 14 hours 37 mins (including stopping in Brazil due to injury)	2nd	53
Derek Hatfield	Canada	Active House	Eco 60	130 days 15 hours 42 mins	3rd	51
Chris Stanmore-Major	United Kingdom	Spartan	Eco 60	140 days 4 hours 10 mins	4th	48
Christophe Bullens	Belgium	Five Ocean of Smiles	Eco 60	Retired, Sprint 1		

== See also ==
- Vendée Globe
- Barcelona World Race
- Route du Rhum
- Volvo Ocean Race
