= Derek Hatfield =

Canadian sailor

Personal information
- Born: 30 August 1952 Newcastle, New Brunswick, Canada
- Died: 30 July 2016 (aged 63) Nova Scotia, Canada

Sailing career
- Sport: Sailing

Derek Hatfield (30 August 1952 – 30 July 2016) was a Canadian sailor, and the first Canadian to race solo twice around the world.

== Biography ==
Hatfield attended Nackawic High School in Nackawic, New Brunswick, and then earned a Bachelor of Administrative Studies degree from York University. He joined the RCMP in 1971. There, he rose to become a fraud investigator. In 1986, he was hired by the Toronto Stock Exchange to lead their auditors, as manager of the compliance department.

Hatfield competed in several short-handed long-distance races around the turn of the century, for example:

- 1st place 1994 Labatt's Single-handed Race Series.
- 7th place 1996 Europe One Single-handed Transatlantic Race;
- 1st place and Overall Winner of the 1996 Legend Cup Transatlantic Race;
- 2nd place 1997 Bermuda One Two;
- 2nd place 1999 Bermuda One Two;
- 4th place 2001 Bermuda One Two;

Hatfield invested most of his pension monies in his 40-foot Spirit of Canada yacht, which he built himself along with friends and family.

Hatfield won Sail Canada's and Ontario Sailing's Sailor of the Year awards in 2003, after finishing first in class and 10th overall in the Around Alone race, and that after he had wasted nearly a month in Ushuaia, Argentina repairing the mast, which had snapped in three places during a storm off Cape Horn.

Hatfield was the subject of Adam Mayers's 2006 book Sea of Dreams: Racing Alone Around The World In A Small Boat.

In 2008 Hatfield competed in the Vendee Globe, but was forced to pull out when a large wave broke two of the mast spreaders on his new Open 60-class boat. The keel of the new boat had been laid in October 2004, and the boat was estimated to need 18,000 man-hours to complete. At the time, he had planned to compete in the 2006-07 5-Oceans Challenge. The hull, Canada's first Open 60, was indeed launched in Cobourg, Ontario on 9 September 2006. At the time, the keel, mast and rigging were scheduled to be assembled by spring of 2007.

At the age of 57, in 2010 he placed third in the VELUX 5-Oceans single-handed around the world race.

You have to feel so secure in what you're doing on the boat all the time that you really don't feel that you're at risk just because you're a thousand miles from land... If there was any fear at all of the ocean or of being alone, that fear would stop you from going and you would never leave the dock.

Hatfield lived in Mahone Bay, Nova Scotia. He served as an ambassador/fundraiser for Toronto’s Broad Reach Foundation for Youth Leaders, which aims to expose at-risk youth to sailing.

Hatfield's death was described as "sudden", and being due to an infection acquired after surgery for throat cancer diagnosed in February 2016.

== Achievements ==
- 1995 Bermuda One–Two, 3rd place.
- 1996 Legend Cup Transatlantic Race, 1st in class, 1st overall.
- 1996 Europe One Single-handed Transatlantic Race, 7th in class.
- 2002–2003 Around Alone, 3rd place, 1st on points.
- 2008 Vendée Globe competitor, retired.
- 2010–2011 Velux 5 Oceans Race, 2010–2011, 3rd place.
