= Richard Wilson (sailor) =

American sailor

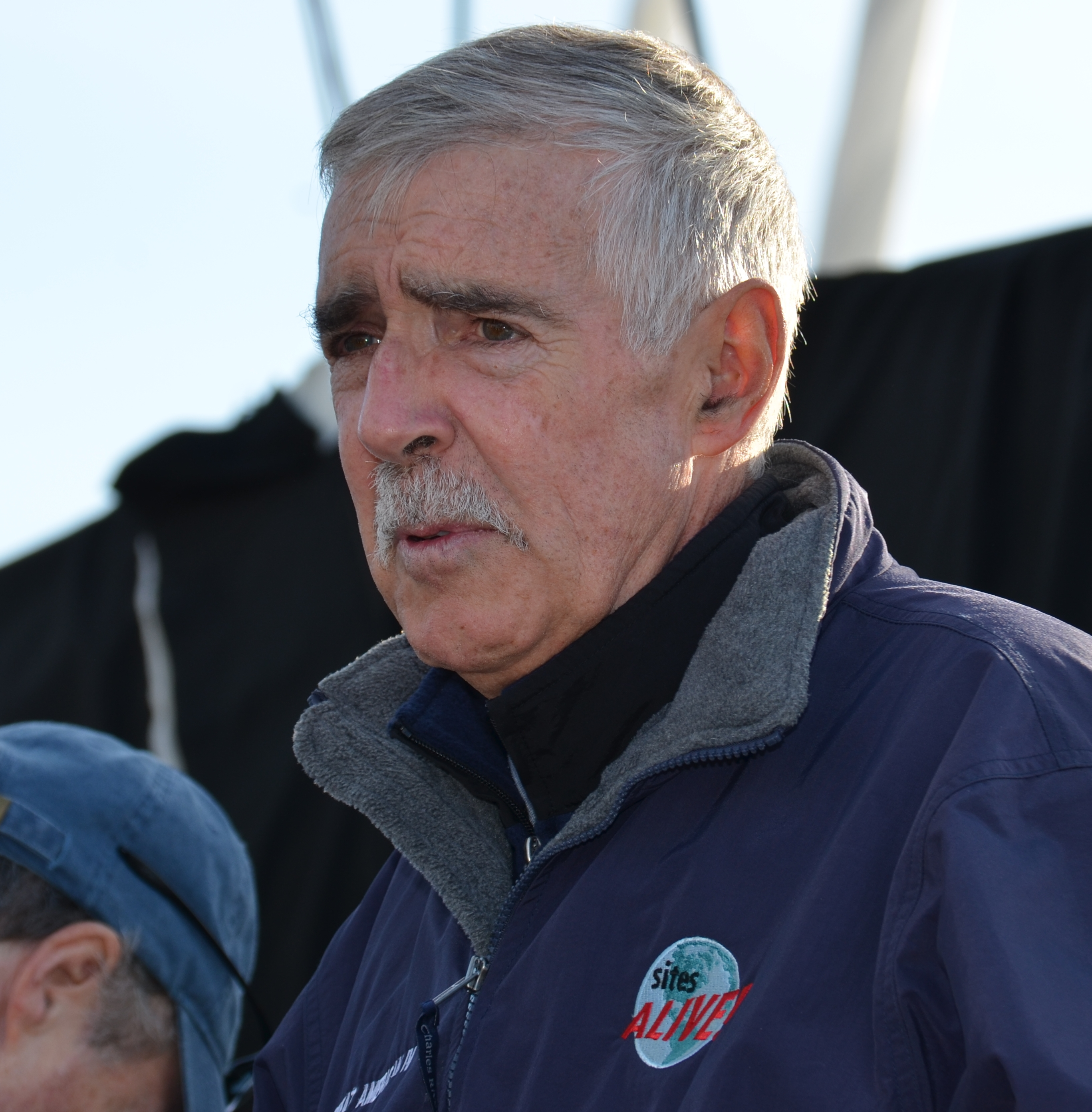

Personal information
- Nationality: American
- Born: 20 April 1950 (age 76) Boston

Sailing career
- Sport: Sailing
- Class: IMOCA 60

Rich Wilson is an American male sailor born on 20 April 1950 in Boston. He is an offshore sailor having extensively competed in the Figaro class.

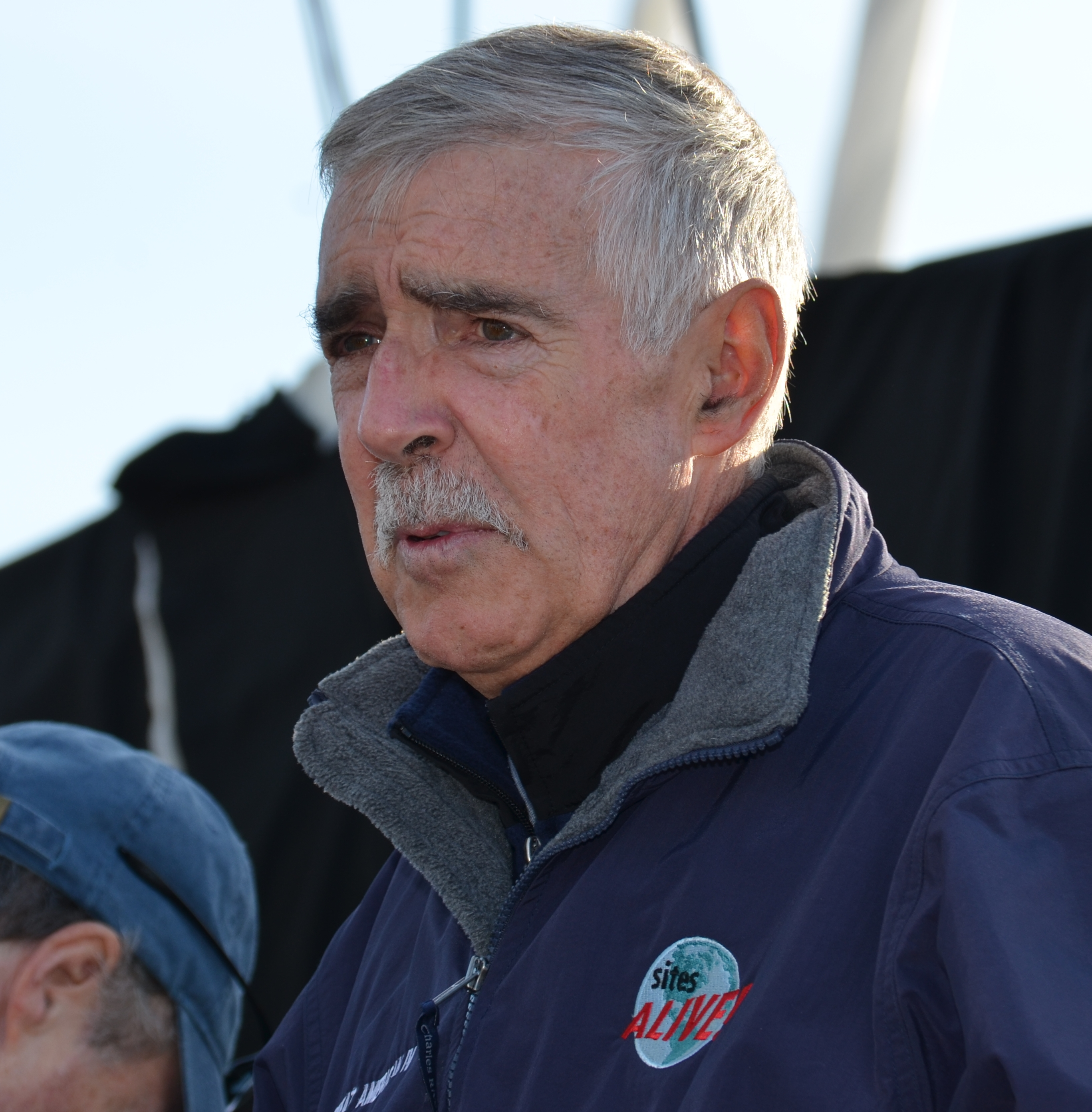

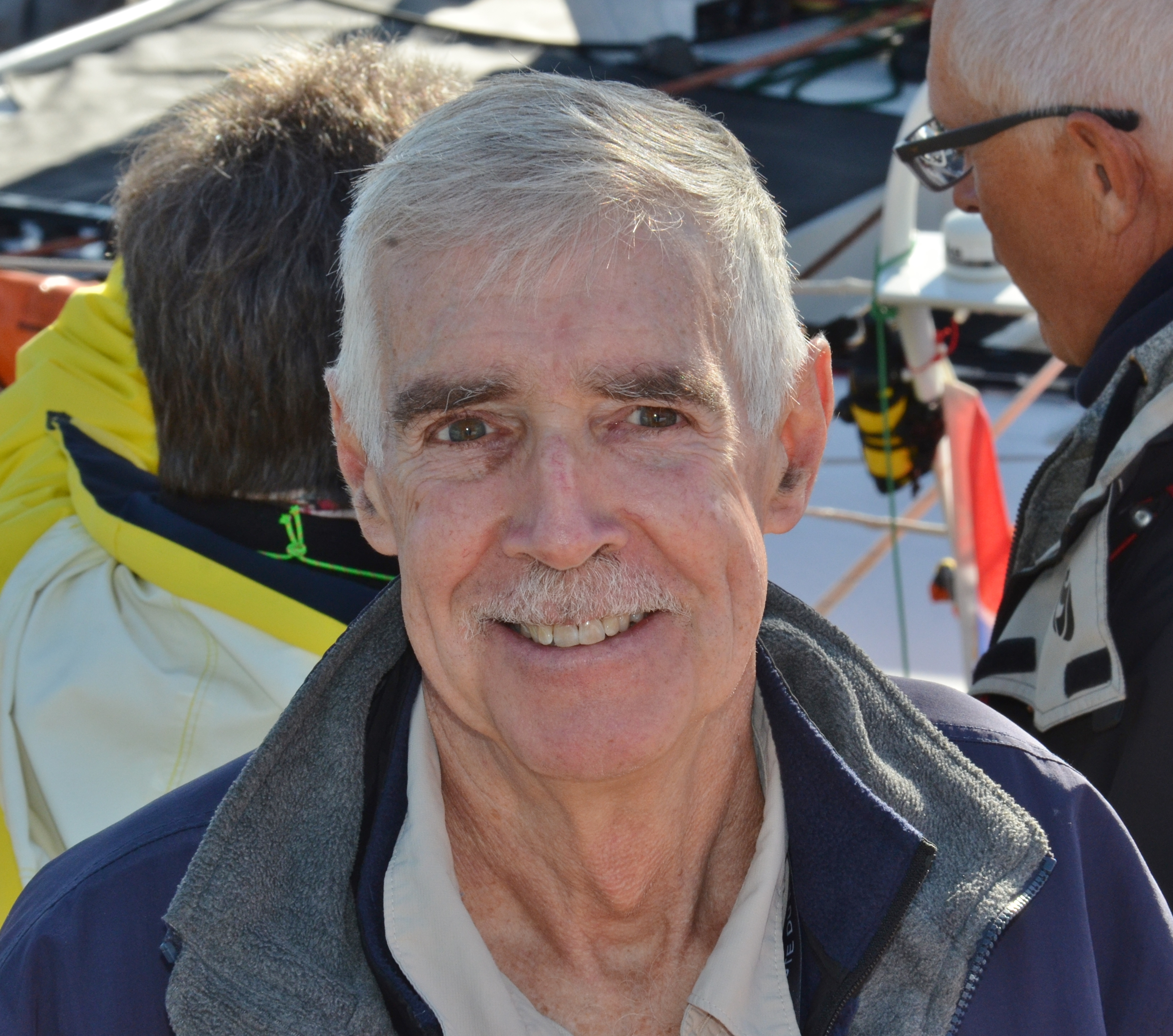

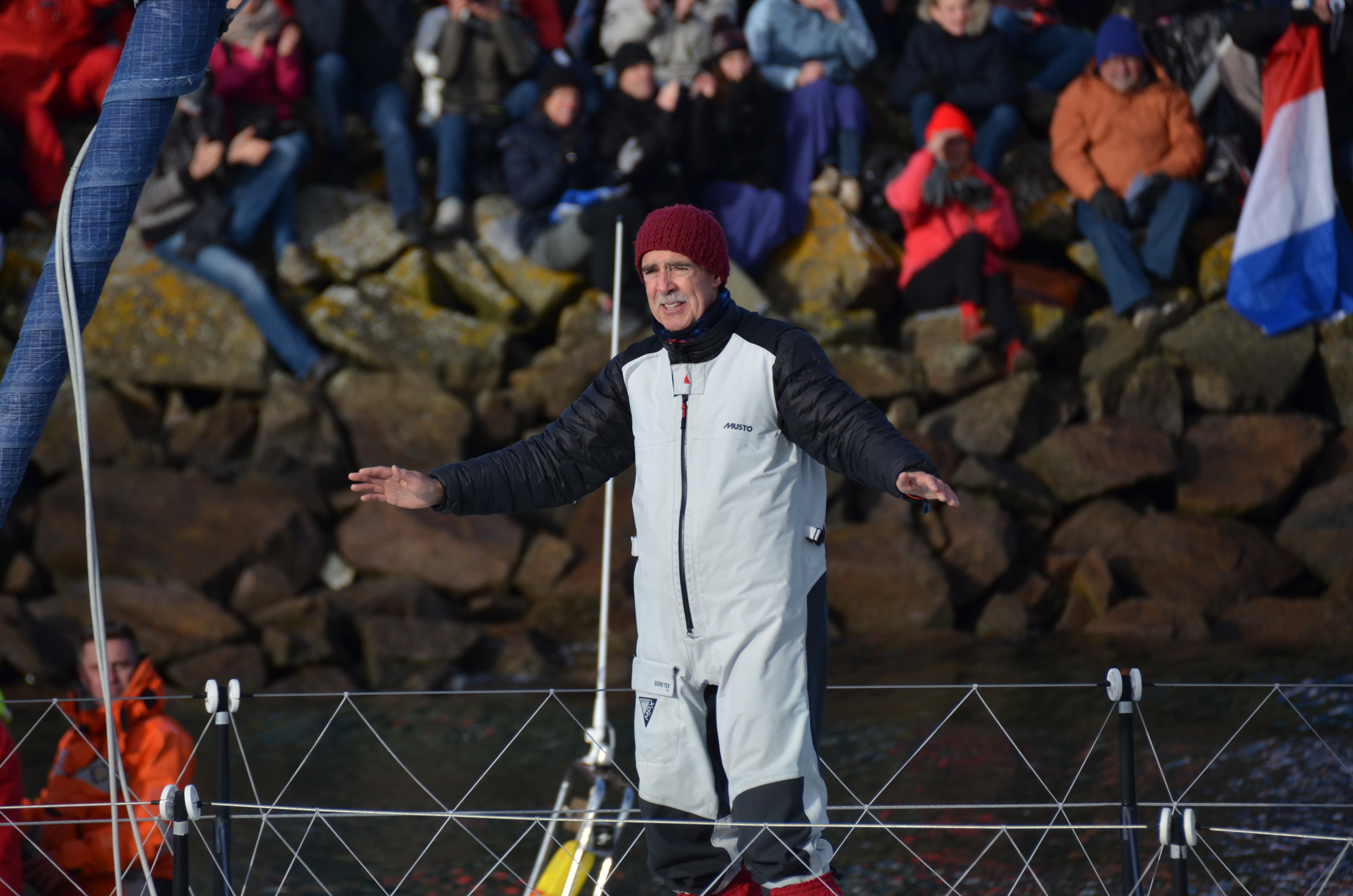

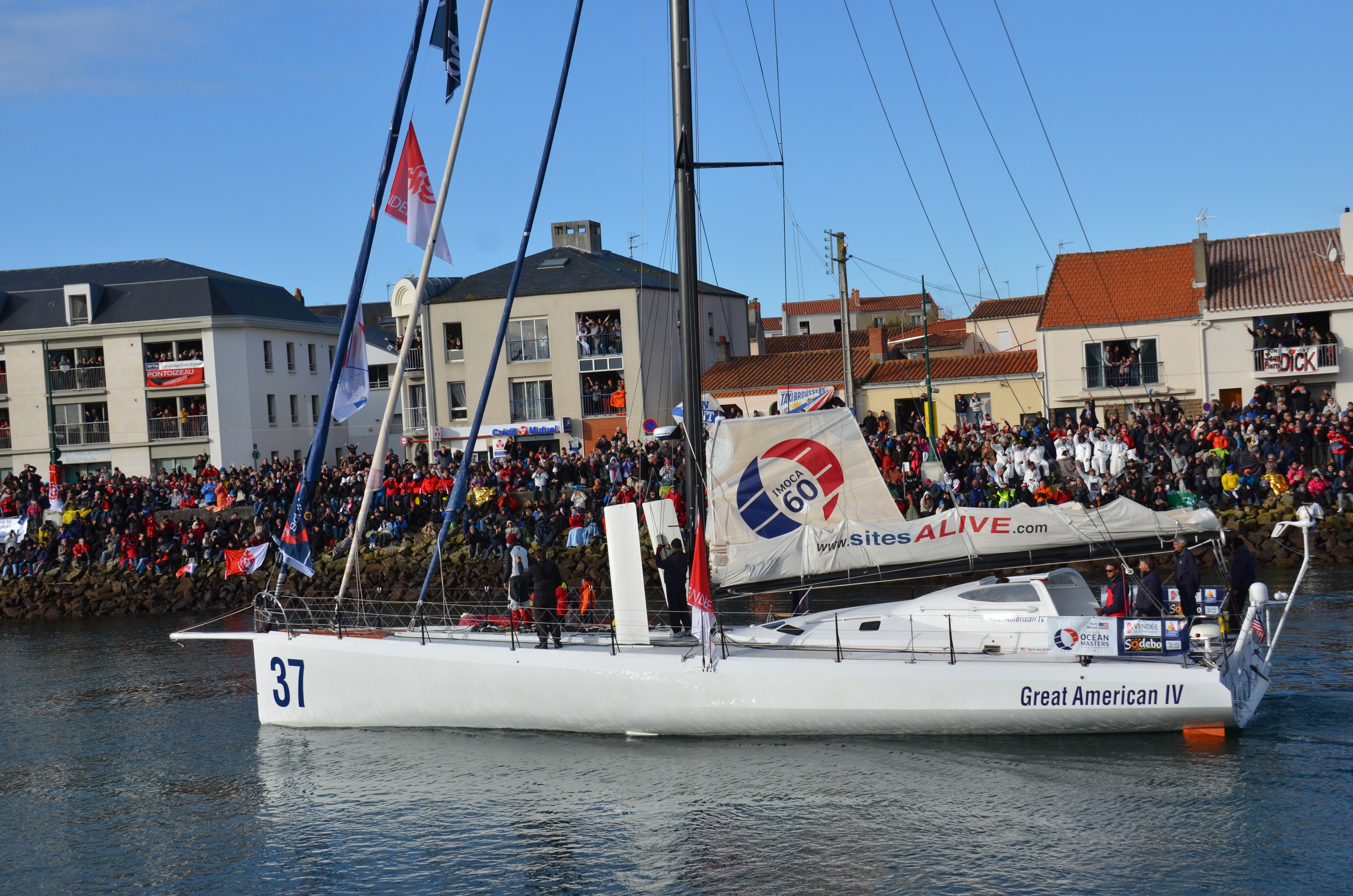

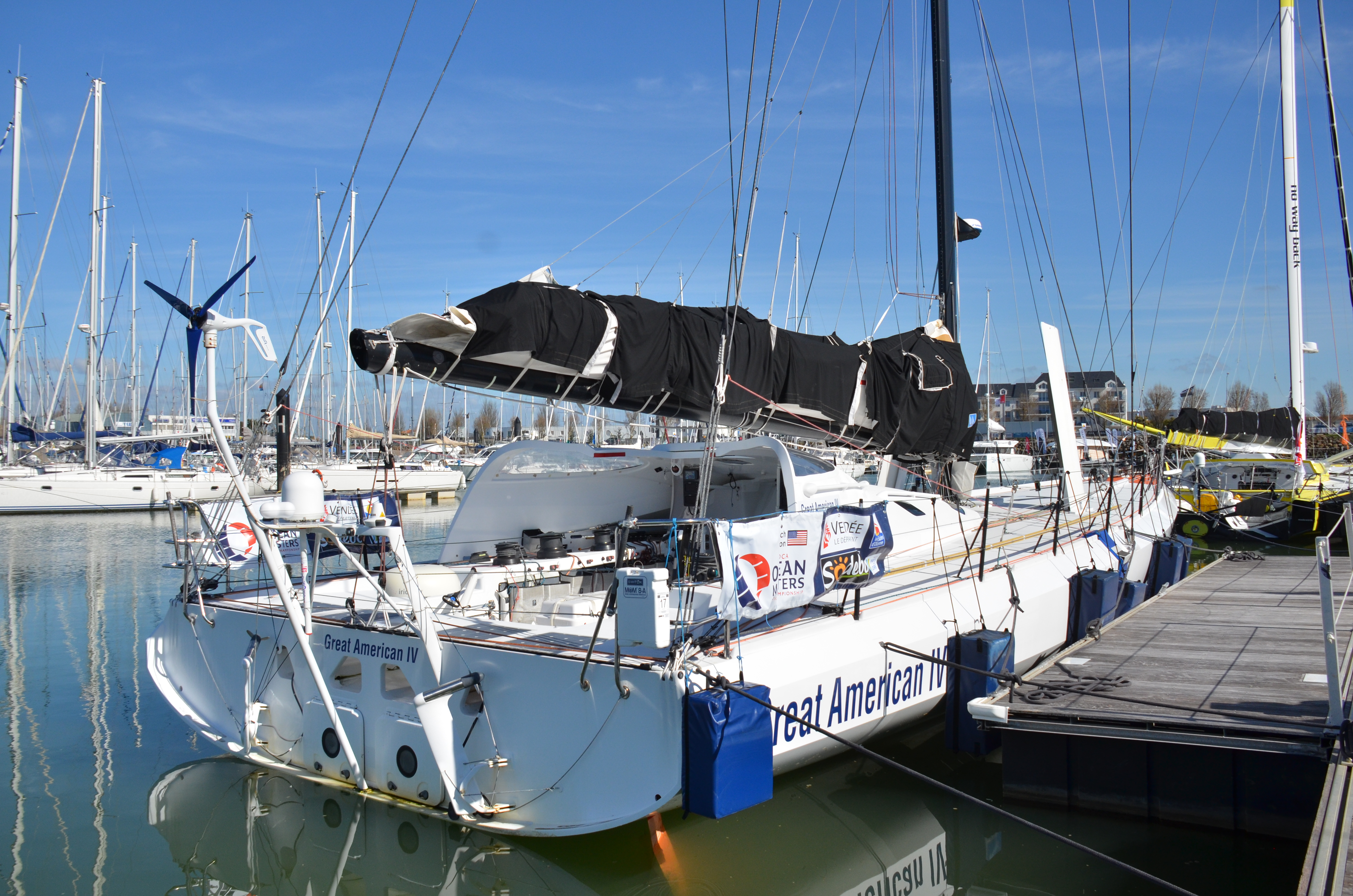

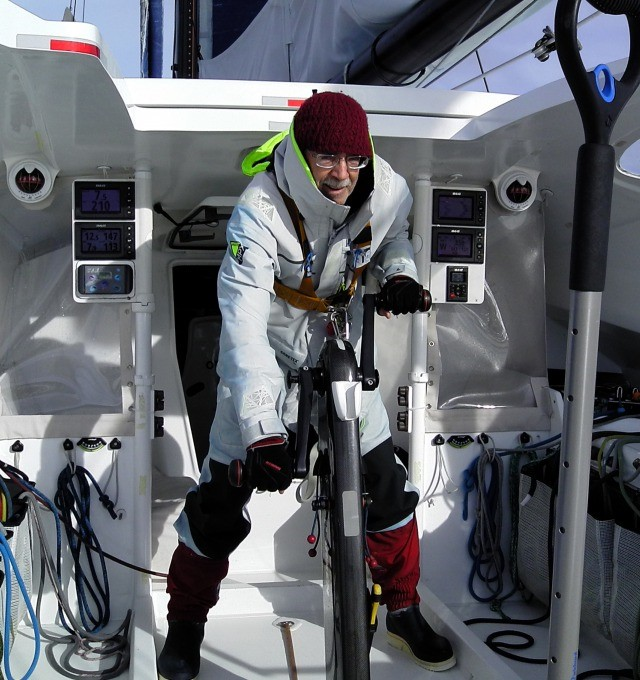

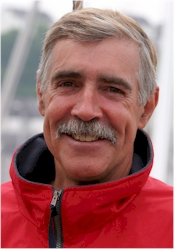

== Achievements ==
- 1980: Newport-Bermuda, Holger Danske, Overall Winner.
- 1988: C-STAR, Curtana – Class V Multihulls – 1st.
- 1990: San Francisco-Boston, Great American capsizes off Cape Horn.
- 1993: World Record: San Francisco-Boston, Great American II vs. Clipper Northern Light, 69 days.
- 2001 World Record: New York-Melbourne, Great American II vs. Clipper Mandarin, with Bill Biewenga, 68 days.
- 2003: World Record: Hong Kong-New York, Great American II vs. Clipper Sea Witch, with Rich du Moulin, 72 days.
- 2004: The Transat: Plymouth-Boston, Great American II; Class 2 Multihulls, 2nd place, 15 days, solo.
- 2008–2009: Vendée Globe: Great American III; finished 9th of 30 starters, 121 days.
- 2016–2017: Vendée Globe: Great American IV; finished 13th of 24 starters, 107 days.
