= Voortrekker (yacht) =

Racing yacht

- Nation: South Africa
- Sail no: SA 1
- Designer(s): Ricus van de Stadt
- Builder: Thesens
- Owner(s): South African Navy

Racing career
- Skippers: Bruce Dalling; Bertie Reed

Specifications
- Length: 50 feet

Voortrekker is a 50-foot (15 m) racing yacht that became famous for placing first on handicap in the 1968 Single-Handed Trans-Atlantic Race and for placing second in the BOC Challenge in 1982/83 when it was 14 years old and had been considered obsolete.

== History ==
The Springbok Ocean Racing Trust announced that South Africa would have an entrant in the 1968 Single-Handed Trans-Atlantic Race and began fundraising to build a yacht. A design was ordered from Ricus van de Stadt and the order to build her was placed with Thesens of Knysna. Originally designed as a ketch, she was later re-rigged as a racing sloop by Brian Lello. Lello was the then-editor of the SA Yachting magazine, who created a technical outline of what was needed to create a race-winner. This outline was sent to Van de Stadt who then created the design for Voortrekker. Thesens of Knysna won the tender and quoted R35,000 for the construction. However, no financial backers came forward so Dr Anton Rupert of the Rembrandt Group offered to guarantee payment so that construction could begin.

At the same time the Trust began looking for a skipper and Bruce Dalling was selected to be her first skipper. Dalling took Voortrekker to first place on handicap in the Observer Transatlantic Race. His success in this race led to a surge of interest in sailing in South Africa.

In 1969, Voortrekker was handed over to the South African Navy Sailing Association, to be used for sail training and to take part in ocean racing for South Africa.

== 1982/83 BOC Challenge ==
In 1982, Voortrekker (branded Altech Voortrekker to reflect its sponsorship by Altech) entered the BOC Challenge. Voortrekker was skippered by Navy Warrant Officer Bertie Reed and was 17 years old at that time, the oldest boat in the fleet. Reed described her as the "fastest, most uncomfortable, prettiest 50-footer around".

Due to her age and being pitted against competitors using the latest technologies and materials available at the time, Voortrekker was considered obsolete. Despite this, Reed placed second across the line and first on handicap, behind the yacht Credite Agricole, which had been purpose-built for this race.

== Sail training ==
Voortrekker was later used for sail training by the South African Navy and entered in a number of Cape to Rio races with sailors from disadvantaged backgrounds in conjunction with the Izivunguvungu Sailing School. In 2009, after an absence of 14 years, Voortrekker entered the 2009 Cape to Bahia race.

== Transfer to the South African Naval Museum ==
Almost two years to the day that an epic "mega-move" brought the Daphne-class submarine SAS ASSEGAAI to its new museum-home, the yacht was added to the South African Naval Museum collection.

Earlier in the year (2026) Chief of the Navy, V Adm Monde Lobese approved the transfer of the yacht to the Naval Museum. The project to relocate the yacht from the Sailing Centre in West Yard to the Naval Museum annex near Cole Point in Simon's Town was headed by R Adm Hanno Teuteberg (Ret) and Cdr John Martin (Ret) with the support of Flag Officer Fleet R Adm Handsome Matsane, and the assistance of Fleet Maintenance Unit, Armscor Dockyard, Sailing Centre, the Naval Museum and False Bay Yacht Club personnel. Earlier in the year the Royal Cape Yacht Club and SA Ocean Racing Trust had provided much support to refurbish the all important cradle, needed for the move.

The relocation of the yacht on 17 July 2026 was only the first step in the project that will eventually transform the historic yacht to a world class museum exhibition, focussed on the history of sailing in the Navy.
