= Giovanni Soldini =

Italian ocean racer (born 1966)

- Giovanni Soldini
- Born: Milan, Italy
- Occupation: Ocean Sailor

Giovanni Soldini (born 16 May 1966) is an Italian sailor who competes in single-handed and crewed ocean racing. He is best known for winning the 1998–1999 Around Alone round-the-world race and for rescuing French sailor Isabelle Autissier during the competition. He has also competed in the OSTAR, BOC Challenge, ORMA 60 trimaran circuit and Class40 races, and has established sailing records on several ocean routes.

== Early life ==
Giovanni Soldini was born in Milan, Italy, on 16 May 1966. He began sailing as a child and made his first Atlantic crossing at the age of 16.

In 1989, he won the Atlantic Rally for Cruisers, a transatlantic sailing event for cruising yachts. He made his debut in solo ocean racing in the La Baule–Dakar race in 1991, finishing third overall aboard Looping.

== Solo ocean racing ==
In 1992, Soldini competed in the OSTAR aboard the Open 50 Looping, finishing second. He returned to the race in 1996, winning the 50-foot class and setting a new class record.

== Around Alone and rescue of Isabelle Autissier ==
In 1998–1999, Soldini competed in the Around Alone, a solo round-the-world race sailed in stages, aboard the 60-foot yacht Fila. During the third leg, from Auckland to Punta del Este, French sailor Isabelle Autissier capsized her yacht PRB in the South Pacific Ocean on 15 February 1999 and activated her distress beacon. Soldini, who was competing in the same leg, diverted from the race to search for her.

He reached Autissier on 16 February and brought her aboard Fila. He then resumed his course toward Punta del Este, where he won the leg.

Soldini also won the overall Around Alone competition.

== Multihull and Class40 racing ==
From 2001 to 2005, Soldini competed in the ORMA 60 trimaran class. In 2001, he launched Fila Tri, an 18-metre trimaran designed for ocean racing. Soldini competed in the ORMA circuit and in major offshore races during this period.

During his ORMA 60 campaign, Soldini finished seventh among the ORMA yachts in the 2001 Transat Jacques Vabre and won the 2002 Roma per 2. In 2004, he finished seventh in The Transat and fifth in the Québec–Saint-Malo race.

In 2005, Soldini and Vittorio Malingri were competing in the Transat Jacques Vabre aboard TIM Progetto Italia when the trimaran capsized approximately 500 nautical miles south of Dakar. The two sailors were subsequently rescued by a tanker.

From 2007 to 2009, Soldini competed in the Class40 fleet aboard Telecom Italia. In 2007, he won the Transat Jacques Vabre with Pietro D'Ali. In 2008, he won the Grand Prix Petit Navire in Douarnenez and the Artemis Transat, a solo transatlantic race from Plymouth to Boston.

In 2009, Soldini won the Grand Prix Petit Navire, the Transmanche and the Les Sables–Horta–Les Sables race aboard Telecom Italia. He also finished second in the Rolex Fastnet Race and La Solidaire du Chocolat.

== Maserati ==
In 2012, Soldini began an ocean-racing programme aboard the VOR 70 monohull Maserati. The programme included attempts to establish new records on historic ocean routes. In 2013, Soldini and his crew established a monohull record on the Golden Route, the route from New York City to San Francisco via Cape Horn, covering 13,225 nautical miles in 47 days, 42 minutes and 29 seconds.

In 2014, Maserati won the Cape2Rio Yacht Race and established a new course record of 10 days, 11 hours, 29 minutes and 57 seconds. Soldini also competed in the Transpacific Yacht Race and the Sydney to Hobart Yacht Race, finishing second in the monohull class of the 2013 Transpac and fourth in the 2015 Sydney–Hobart.

== Maserati Multi70 ==
In 2016, Soldini began a new programme aboard Maserati Multi70, a 70-foot ocean-racing trimaran. The boat was subsequently equipped with hydrofoils and was used for offshore races and sailing-record attempts.

In 2018, Soldini and his crew set a World Sailing Speed Record Council-ratified record on the Hong Kong–London route, covering 12,948 nautical miles in 36 days, 2 hours, 37 minutes and 12 seconds.

In 2021, Soldini established a new record on the original Fastnet Race course aboard Maserati Multi70, completing the 595-nautical-mile course in 23 hours, 51 minutes and 16 seconds.

In 2022, Maserati Multi70 was converted to a full-electric racing system. The project also included the collection of oceanographic data in connection with the United Nations Decade of Ocean Science for Sustainable Development.

In January 2023, Soldini and Maserati Multi70 won the Multihull Line Honours in the RORC Transatlantic Race, setting a new race record of 5 days, 5 hours, 46 minutes and 26 seconds.

Soldini and his crew completed a circumnavigation aboard the electrically powered Maserati Multi70 between October 2022 and January 2024.

== Ferrari Hypersail ==
From 2024 until April 2026, Soldini served as Team Principal of the Ferrari Hypersail project, Ferrari's ocean-sailing development programme.

His collaboration with Ferrari ended on 2 April 2026.

== Honours and awards ==
Soldini was appointed a Knight of the French Légion d'honneur in 2000 in recognition of his rescue of French sailor Isabelle Autissier during the 1998–1999 Around Alone race.

He was appointed an Officer of the Order of Merit of the Italian Republic on 12 February 2004.

Soldini received the Gold Medal of Merit of the Italian Navy on two occasions. The first was conferred in 1999 for his rescue of Isabelle Autissier in the South Pacific during the 1998–1999 Around Alone race. The second was conferred in 2008 in recognition of his sailing achievements and his rescue of a sailor in the South Pacific. The medal was presented to Soldini by President of the Italian Republic Giorgio Napolitano on 10 June 2008, during the Festa della Marina.

== Bibliography ==
Soldini, Giovanni (2000). Nel blu. Una storia di vita e di mare. Milan: Longanesi.

Soldini, Giovanni (2013). Sulla rotta dell'oro. New York–San Francisco via Cape Horn. Milan: Longanesi.

Borlenghi, Carlo (2013). B.O.C. Challenge 94-95. Il giro del mondo in solitario di Giovanni Soldini. Lecco: Dominioni.

Soldini, Giovanni (2024). Oltre i limiti. Dieci anni in oceano con Maserati. Milan: Nutrimenti Mare.
