= Voortrekker High School =

Voortrekker High School (Afrikaans: Hoërskool Voortrekker) may refer to:

- Voortrekker High School (Pietermaritzburg)
- Voortrekker High School (Cape Town)
- Hoërskool Voortrekker (Boksburg)
- Bethlehem Voortrekker High School
