= Bertie Reed =

South African yachtsman

- The plaque for a bust of Bertie Reed at the V&A Waterfront

Personal information
- Full name: Stanley John Reed
- Nicknames: Bertie; Biltong Bertie
- Nationality: South African
- Born: 19 January 1943 Port Elizabeth, South Africa
- Died: 18 December 2006 (aged 63) Gordon's Bay, South Africa

Sailing career
- Sport: Sailing

Stanley John Reed (19 January 1943 – 18 December 2006), known as Bertie Reed, was a South African yachtsman. He was the first South African to complete three singlehanded circumnavigations.

== Life ==
Reed was born in Port Elizabeth in 1943.

He joined the South African Navy in 1961 and served for 21 years. He started sailing whilst in the Navy.

In the 1982–1983, BOC Challenge race he placed second in the Knysna built yacht, Voortrekker. At the time Voortrekker was 14 years old and considered obsolete.

In the 1986–1987, race he was placed 7th, sailing Stabilo Boss, a yacht subsequently raced as Maiden.

He was awarded South Africa's highest civilian award for bravery, the Wolraad Woltemade Decoration for his rescue of sailor John Martin whose yacht sank after hitting a submerged iceberg in the Southern Ocean during the 1990–1991 BOC Challenge.

In 2006, he was inducted into the Single-Handed Sailors' Hall of Fame.

He received Springbok colours 5 times for sailing.

== Death ==
He died at his home in Gordon's Bay from cancer.

In 2009, a bronze bust of Bertie Reed, by local Cape Town sculptor Charl Frank, was unveiled at the Victoria & Alfred Waterfront by Sir Robin Knox-Johnson.
