= Josh Hall (sailor) =

British yachtsman

Josh Hall (born 18 May 1962) is a former British yachtsman.

== Career ==
Hall competed in the multiple solo round the World Races

- 1990 BOC Challenge
- 1994 BOC Challenge
- 1998 BOC Challenge
- 2000-2001 Vendée Globe

During the 1994 BOC Challenge, Hall's yacht sunk during the first leg from Charleston to Cape Town and he was rescued by competitor Alan Nebauer.
