= Isabelle Autissier =

French sailor (born 1956)

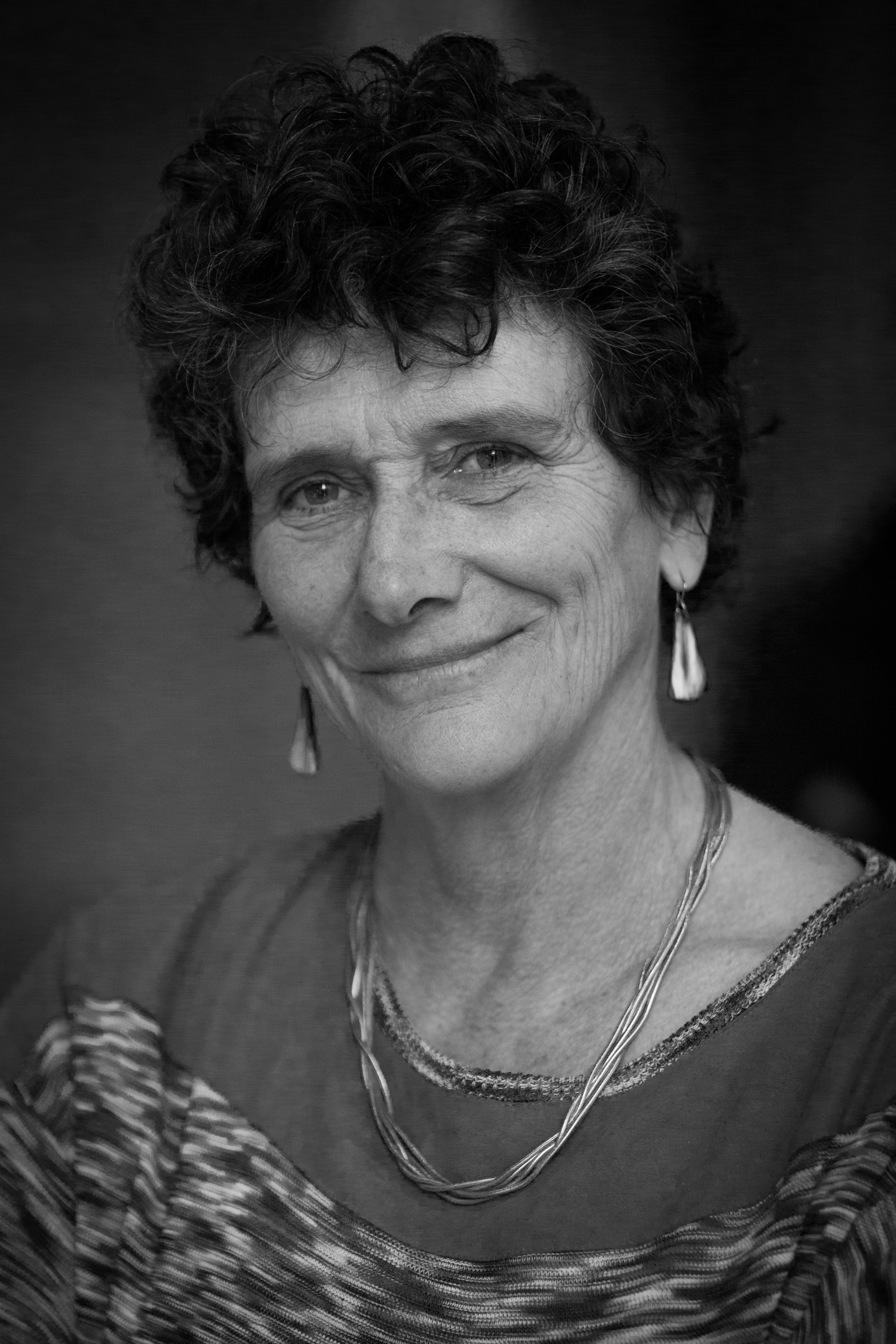
- Isabelle Autissier in 2015
- Born: 18 October 1956 (age 70); Paris
- Education: École nationale supérieure agronomique de Rennes
- Occupations: Sailor, writer and environment activist

Isabelle Autissier (born 18 October 1956) is a French sailor, navigator, writer, and broadcaster. She is celebrated for being the first woman to have completed a solo world navigation in competition (BOC Challenge 1990–91). Based in La Rochelle since 1980, she is also a writer and honorary president of World Wildlife Fund-France.

== Childhood and early career ==
Isabelle Autissier was born in the 12th arrondissement of Paris and later moved to the suburb of Saint-Maur-les-Fossés. She discovered sailing in Brittany from the age of six when her father, architect Jean Autissier, taught her and her sisters how to sail.

She later graduated from the National Agronomy School of Rennes (École nationale supérieure agronomique de Rennes) with a degree in fisheries. In 1980, she carried out research on langoustines and large crustaceans. This research activity continued in La Rochelle under the aegis of IFREMER ('French Research Institute for Exploitation of the Sea'), where she studied the fisheries of the Bay of Biscay. From 1984 to 1990, she taught at the Maritime and Aquaculture School of La Rochelle.

== Sailing career ==
In 1991, she founded the International Monohull Open Class Association (IMOCA) with Christophe Auguin, Alain Gautier and Jean-Luc Van Den Heede, to bring together the skippers of 60-foot monohulls.

Also in 1991, she finished 7th in The BOC Challenge, thereby becoming the first woman to race competitively around-the-world solo. It was this success that prompted her to give up teaching to devote herself entirely to racing.

While competing in the 1994–95 BOC Challenge, Autissier's boat Ecureuil Poitou Charentes II was dismasted and severely damaged approximately 900 nautical miles (1,700 km) south of Adelaide, Australia. Autissier was rescued on 1 January 1995 by a Seahawk helicopter launched from the Royal Australian Navy frigate, HMAS Darwin.

On her return, her newly acquired reputation enabled her to obtain the financial support of the Vendée company PRB ("Building Coatings Products") and to hire the architect Jean-Marie Finot and the builder Marc Pinta to build her a new "IMOCA Open 60" boat. This means the boat design is regulated by measurement and safety rules, but, as long as those rules are respected, designers have considerable freedom.

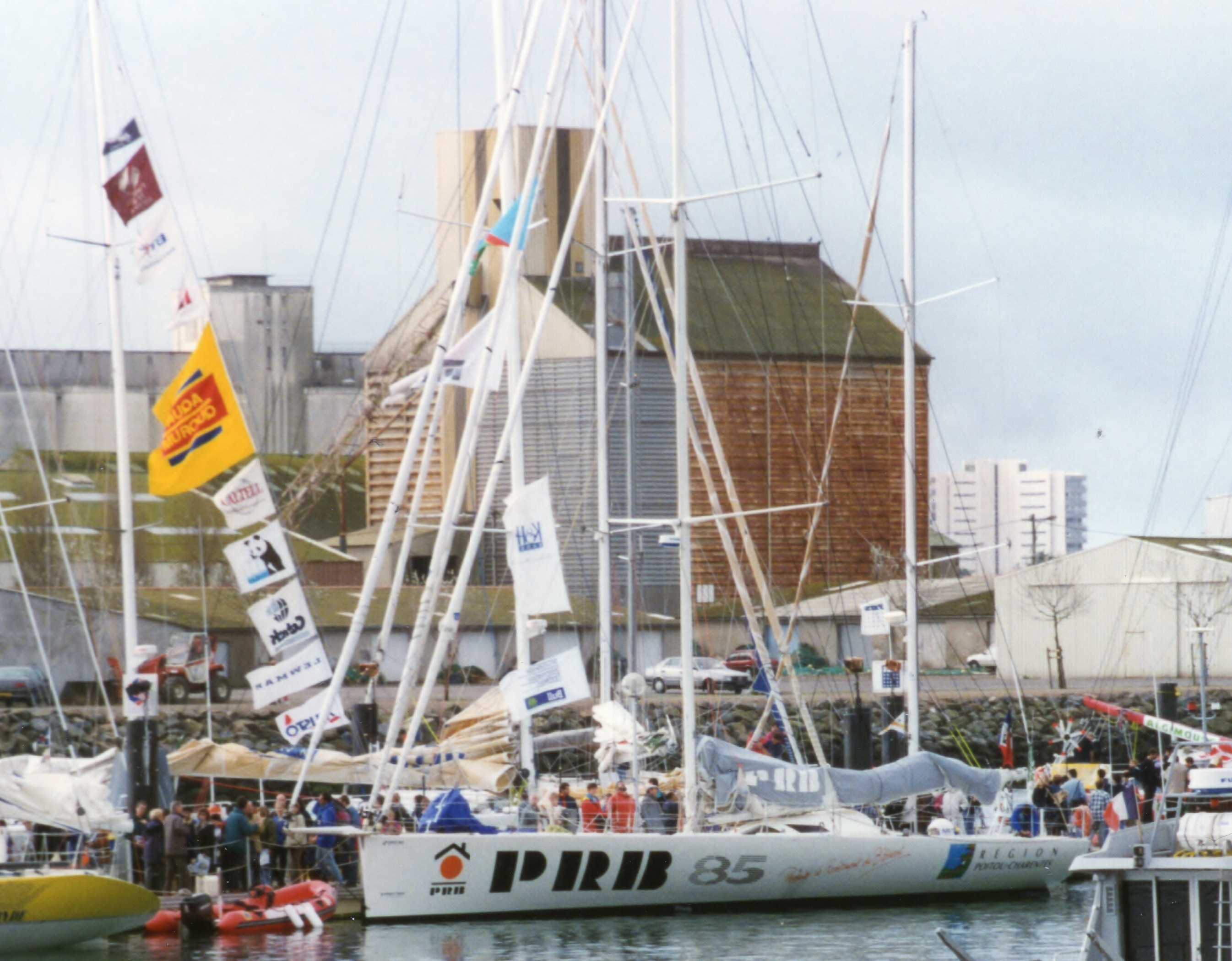
Isabelle Autissier's PRB boat, at the start of the 1996–1997 Vendée Globe

With her new boat—the PRB, launched in July 1996—she took part in the 1996–1997 Vendée Globe, a non-stop race during which she was disqualified after stopping in Cape Town to repair a damaged rudder. However, she set off again to finish the course out of the competition. With competitors facing extremely difficult conditions, Autissier turned around in the middle of a storm, along with other competitors, to try to find Gerry Roufs, whose Argos beacon had stopped emitting. The searchers were unable to find him and Roufs disappeared at sea in his boat, Groupe LG 2 in January 1997. Autissier resumed the course, fighting against extreme conditions which knocked down her boat on several occasions. She arrived four days after the winner.

In 1999, during the 1998–99 Around Alone race, her boat PRB capsized approximately 1,900 nautical miles (3,500 km) west of Cape Horn In other words she was stranded at Point Nemo. She capsized at 25 knots and her boat remained upside down. The Italian skipper Giovanni Soldini came to her rescue. This accident may have accelerated Autissier's decision to give up solo racing. She nevertheless continued to compete in crewed races.

She competed in the 1997–98 Whitbread Round the World Race on board EF Education.

== Writing career and other activities ==
Isabelle Autissier has also turned to writing. She has produced several stories and essays, as well as an opera libretto, Homo Loquax.

In 2009, Isabelle Autissier published the novel Seule la mer s'en souviendra ("Only the sea will remember"), the story of a deception at sea inspired by a real event—the Donald Crowhurst case in 1969.

In December 2009, she was elected president of the French branch of the World Wildlife Fund (WWF). In 2012, she presented Les contes d'Isabelle Autissier, a program broadcast every Sunday on France Inter. She also presented on France Inter the program, In extremis, during the summer. The show ended in 2016. She has since devoted herself to her charities, including the WWF.

== See also ==
- Florence Artaud
- Alain Colas
- Clarisse Crémer
- Michel Desjoyeaux
- Jean Le Cam
- Armel Le Cléac’h
- Bernard Moitessier
- Éric Tabarly
- Jean-Luc Van Den Heede
- Olivier de Kersauson
- Port-Christmas

== Bibliography ==
- Rendez-vous avec la mer (Rendez-vous with the sea), with Antoine Le Séguillon (Solar, 1996)
- Une solitaire autour du monde (Alone around the World), with Éric Cocquerel (Arthaud, 1997)
- Kerguelen, le voyageur au pays de l'ombre (Kerguelen, the Traveller in the Land of Shadow), (Grasset, 2006)
- Salut au Grand Sud (Goodbye to the Great South), with Érik Orsenna, (Stock, 2006)
- Versant océan : l'île du bout du monde (Sloping Ocean: the Island at the end of the World) with Lionel Daudet, (Grasset, 2008)
- Passer par le Nord. La nouvelle route maritime (Going through the North. The new sea route), with Érik Orsenna (Paulsen, 2014)
- Soudain, seuls (LGF/Le Livre de Poche, 2016)
- La Fille du grand hiver (Poulsen, 2025)
