= Philippe Jeantot =

French former deep sea diver (born 1952)

Philippe Jeantot (French pronunciation: [filip ʒɑ̃to]; born 8 May 1952) is a French former deep sea diver, who achieved recognition as a sailor for long-distance, single-handed racing and record-setting. He founded the Vendée Globe, a single-handed, round-the-world, non-stop yacht race.

== Biography ==
Born in Antananarivo, Madagascar, Jeantot started his career as a deep sea diver, working on oil rigs; in 1977 he took part in the Janus IV dive of the COMEX during which Jacques Verpeaux and Gérard Vial broke the world record for deep diving, at 501 metres (1,644 ft). He became interested in sailing after reading Bernard Moitessier's book The Long Way; having learned to sail, he built himself a 13.5-metre (44 ft) steel ketch, planning to sail single-handed around the world. After cruising for two years, he entered the first edition of the BOC Challenge (now known as the Velux 5 Oceans Race) in 1982; he won the race, and broke the previous record for a single-handed circumnavigation with a time of 159 days, 2 hours.

In 1984, Jeantot entered the OSTAR, sailing in a new catamaran, Credit Agricole II. He was forced to retire after a capsize, but saved the boat and entered the 1984 Quebec—St. Malo race, in which he set a new 24-hour speed record. In 1985, he had success in the Grand Prix de Brest, La Baule and Round Europe races. In 1986 he again entered the BOC Challenge, sailing Credit Agricole III, and was again victorious.

In 1989, Jeantot founded a new, single-handed, non-stop, round-the-world race, the Vendée Globe. He entered the race in Crédit Agricole IV, and finished in fourth place.

In 1990, Jeantot once again entered the BOC Challenge, sailing Crédit Agricole IV, and finishing in third place, thus completing his fourth solo circumnavigation of the world. After the race, he announced that he was retiring from sailing to manage his boat-building business.

In November 1990, Jeantot was given a suspended two-year sentence and fined €15,000 (£9,900) for tax evasion. Jeantot appealed but the verdict was upheld.

In 2006 Jeantot was charged with financial irregularities which alleged avoidance of corporation tax by his SailCom company, forgery and the misuse of the 'company assets'. Forensic accountancy allegedly found that in excess of €1 million (£660,000) passed through an Irish account rather than SailCom's bank in France. SailCom was set up by Jeantot to run long distance competitive sailing races.

== Bibliography ==
- Jeantot, Philippe (1983). Trois océans pour une victoire (in French). Arthaud. ISBN 9782700304459.
- Jeantot, Philippe (1988). Vaincre autour du monde (in French). Arthaud. ISBN 9782700306798.
- Jeantot, Philippe (1991). Au bout de mes rêves (in French). Arthaud. ISBN 9782700309560.
