= IMOCA 60 Helvim =

Sailboat

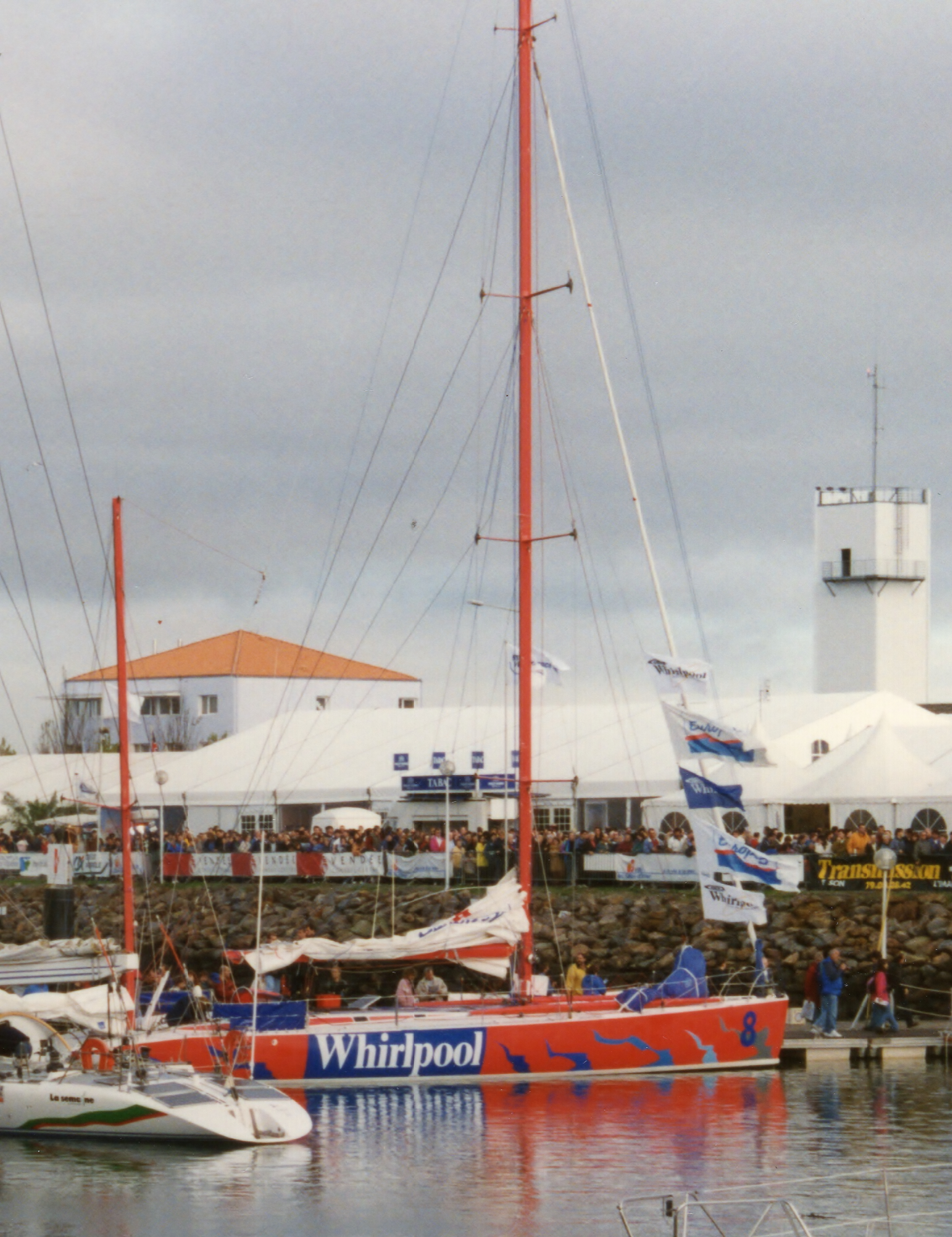

Development
- Builder: CDK Technologies

The IMOCA 60 class yacht Helvim was designed and built by Philippe Harlé and Alain Mortain, constructed at CDK Technologies and was launched in June 1991.

== Racing results ==
Pos	Year	Race	Class	Boat name	Skipper	Notes	Ref
Round the World Races
13 / 20	2005	2004–2005 Vendée Globe	IMOCA 60	Benefic	Karen Leibovici (FRA)	126d 08h	
10 / 24	2001	2000–2001 Vendée Globe	IMOCA 60	ELGE - Nord Pas de Calais- Chocolats du Monde	Joe Seeten (FRA)	115d 17h	
6 / 15	1997	1996–1997 Vendée Globe	IMOCA 60	Whirlpool-Europe 2	Catherine Chabaud (FRA)	140d 04h 38m	
3 / 9	1996	1994-1995 BOC Challenge	IMOCA 60	Vendées Entreprises	Jean-Luc Van Den Heede (FRA)	129d 18h	
2 / 14	1993	1992–1993 Vendée Globe	IMOCA 60	Groupe Sofap-Helvim	Jean-Luc Van Den Heede (FRA)	116d 15h	
Transatlantic Races
Other Races
