= IMOCA 60 PRB 2 =

Sailboat

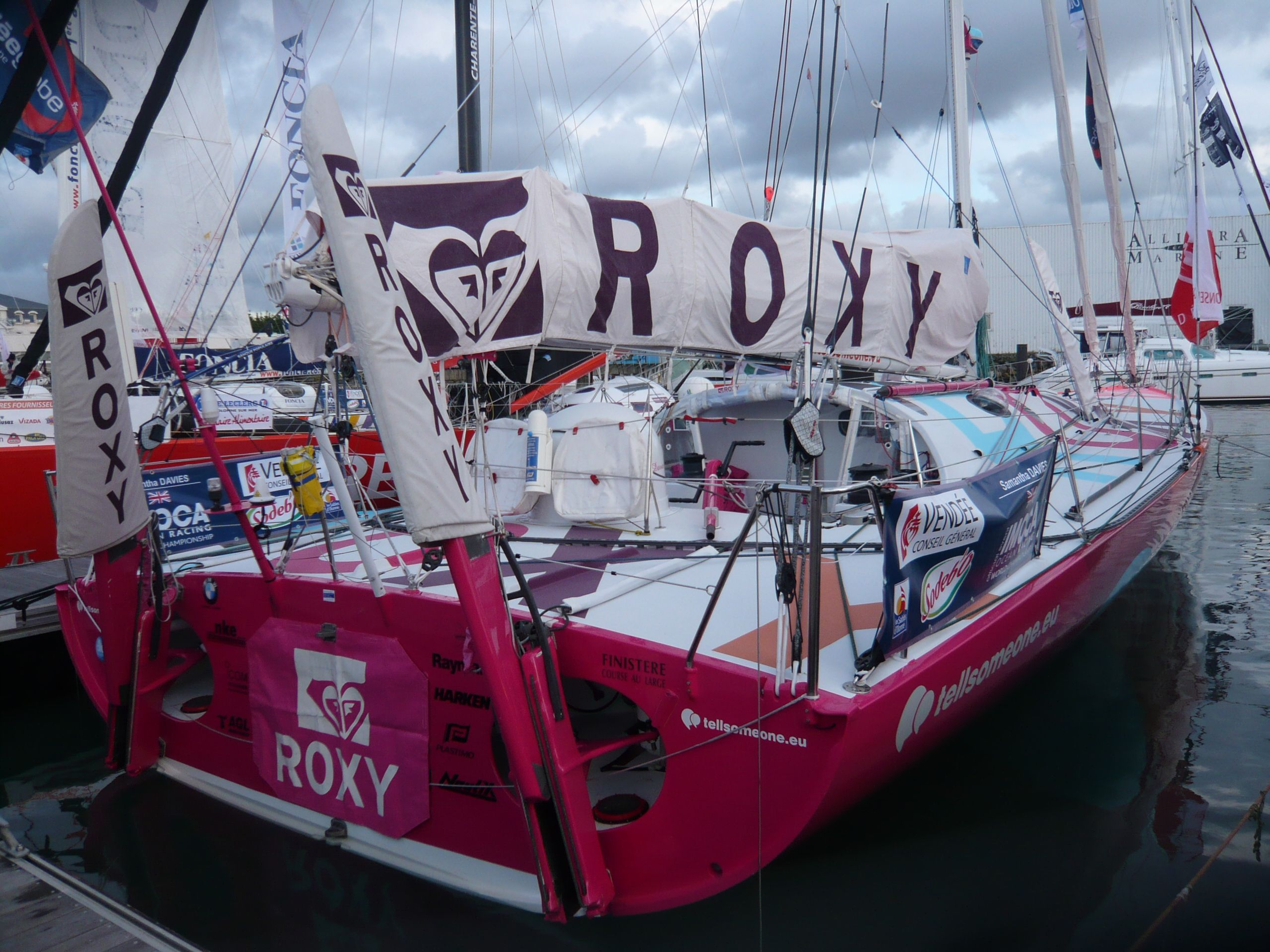

Development
- Designer: Group Finot, Finot-Conq, Pascal Conq
- Year: May 2000
- Builder: Mag France

Racing
- Class association: IMOCA 60

The IMOCA 60 class yacht PRB 2, FRA 85 was designed by Finot-Conq and launched in the May 2000 after being built by CDK Technologies based in Lorient, France.

== Racing results ==
Pos	Year	Race	Class	Boat name	Skipper	Notes	Ref
Round the world races
4 / 30	2008	2008–2009 Vendée Globe	IMOCA 60	Roxy (2), FRA 40	Samantha Davies (GBR)	96d 12h 39m 01s	
1 / 24	2004	2004–2005 Vendée Globe	IMOCA 60	PRB 2	Vincent Riou (FRA)	87d 10h 47m 55s	
1 / 24	2000	2000–2001 Vendée Globe	IMOCA 60	PRB 2	Michel Desjoyeaux (FRA)	93d 03h 57m	
Transatlantic Races
5 / 13	2008	The Artemis Transat	IMOCA 60	Roxy (2)	Samantha Davies (GBR)		
10 / 17	2007	Transat Jacques Vabre	IMOCA 60	Roxy (2)	Jeanne Gregoire (FRA); Samantha Davies (GBR)	18d 21h 56m	
7	2007	Transat B to B	IMOCA 60	Roxy (2)	Samantha Davies (GBR)		
8	2006	Route du Rhum	IMOCA 60	Roxy (2)	Anne Liardet (FRA)		
8 / 12	2005	Transat Jacques Vabre	IMOCA 60	Roxy (2)	Miranda Merron (GBR); Anne Liardet (FRA)	16d 07h 17m	
4 / 7	2003	Transat Jacques Vabre	IMOCA 60	PRB (2)	Jérémie Beyou (FRA); Vincent Riou (FRA)	18d 08h 16m 44s	
Other Races

== Timeline ==
=== 2000-2005 PRB 2 ===
This boat replaced the first PRB and was launched in 1996.

In 2005 the boat was replaced by PRB 3

=== 2005-2010 Roxy (2) ===
The boat is purchased to replace ROXY (1).
