= IMOCA 60 Sill 2 =

Round the World Racing Yacht

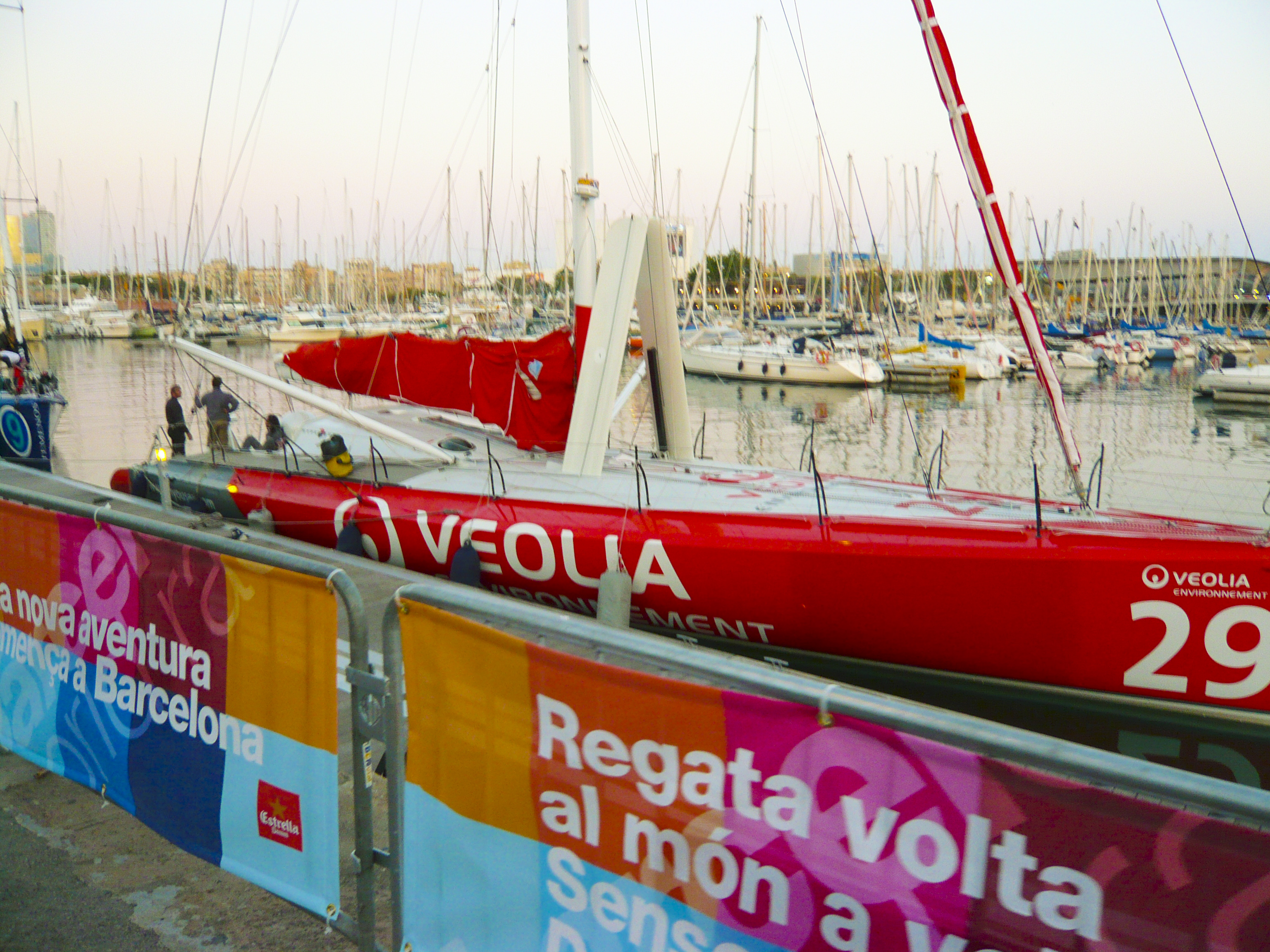

Development
- Designer: Marc Lombard, Marc Lombard Yacht Design Group
- Year: 26 April 2004
- Builder: JMV Industries
- Class association: IMOCA 60

The IMOCA 60 Class yacht Sill-Veolia, FRA 29 was designed by Marc Lombard and launched in the 26 April 2004 after being built JMV based in Cherbourg, France.

== Names and ownership ==
Former names: Sill 2, Sill et Veolia, Veolia Environnement, VE 1, Neutrogena, Saveol, Ethical Power, Vivo A Beira, Kattan

Current name: Partage, Skipper: François Guiffant.

== Racing results ==
Pos	Year	Race	Class	Boat name	Skipper	Notes	Ref
Round the world races
DNF	2012	2012–2013 Vendée Globe	IMOCA 60	SAVEOL, 29	Samantha Davies (GBR)	Day 5: Dismasted (retired unaided under Jury Rig)	
5	2010	Barcelona World Race	IMOCA 60	Neutrogena	Boris Herrmann (GER) Ryan Breymaier (USA)		
DNF	2008	2008–2009 Vendée Globe	IMOCA 60	VEOLIA Environnement	Roland Jourdain (FRA)	day 85: lost keel	
DNF	2004	2004–2005 Vendée Globe	IMOCA 60	SILL et VEOLIA (2)	Roland Jourdain (FRA)	keel problems	
Transatlantic Races
10 / 13	2017	Transat Jacques Vabre	IMOCA 60	Vivo A Beira, FRA 20	Pierre Lacaze (FRA); Yoann Richomme (FRA)	16d 05h 20m	
6 / 14	2009	Transat Jacques Vabre	IMOCA 60	VEOLIA Environnement	Roland Jourdain (FRA); Jean-Luc Nelias (FRA)	18d 22h 16m	
2 / 12	2005	Transat Jacques Vabre	IMOCA 60	VEOLIA Environnement	Roland Jourdain (FRA); Ellen MacArthur (GBR)		
Other Races
