= VDH =

VDH may refer to:

- Pieter van den Hoogenband, multiple olympic gold medallist
- Victor Davis Hanson, a military historian
- Verband für das Deutsche Hundewesen, a dog breed registry organisation
- Jean-Luc Van Den Heede, a French sailor
- Dong Hoi Airport IATA code
- The Virginia Department of Health
