= 2004–2005 Vendée Globe =

Event title
- Name: 2004–2005 Vendée Globe
- Edition: 5th edition
- Sponsor: Vendee Region of France

Event details
- Start location: Les Sables-d'Olonne
- Finish location: Les Sables-d'Olonne
- Course: Solo non-stop round the world race
- Start date: 7 November 2004
- Finish date: 7 November 2004
- Yachts: IMOCA 60
- Key people: Race Director; Denis Horeau

Competitors
- Competing nations: 20

Results
- (gold) Gold: Vincent Riou (FRA)
- (silver) Silver: Jean Le Cam (FRA)
- (bronze) Bronze: Mike Golding (GBR)

The 2004–2005 Vendée Globe was a non-stop solo round-the-world yacht race for IMOCA 60 class yachts. The fifth edition of the race started on 7 November 2004 from Les Sables-d'Olonne.

== Summary ==
The start of the 2004 race was watched by an estimated 300,000 people, which took place in mild weather. A fast start was followed by a few minor equipment problems, allowing the first racers to cross the equator just after 10 days. This was three days faster than the previous race, with all of the starters still sailing.

Attrition began on entry into the Roaring Forties: Alex Thomson diverted to Cape Town to make unassisted repairs and continue racing. The fleet encountered a number of other problems. Hervé Laurent retired with serious rudder problems, Thomson abandoned, and Conrad Humphreys anchored to make unassisted rudder repairs. Gear problems and abandonments continued, then the fleet ran into an area of ice, and Sébastien Josse hit an iceberg head-on.

The lead changed several times as the fleet re-entered the Atlantic. The race remained close right to the finish, which saw three boats finish within 29 hours.

The first Race Director Denis Horeau returned to the role after 15 years to head the event management team.

== Results ==
Table: Order of Finish, 2004–2005 Vendée Globe
Pos	Sailor	G	Yacht	Time	Delta	%	Ref
1	Vincent Riou (FRA)	M	PRB 2	87d 10h 47' 55"	new race record		
2	Jean Le Cam (FRA)	M	Bonduelle 2	87d 17h 20m 08s	0d 06h 32m 13s	0.31%	
3	Mike Golding (GBR)	M	Ecover 2	88d 15h 15m 13s	1d 04h 27m 18s	1.36%	
4	(Switzerland) Dominique Wavre	M	Temenos (1)	92d 17h 13m 20s	5d 06h 25m 25s	6.02%	
5	Sébastien Josse (FRA)	M	VMI	93d 00h 02m 10s	5d 13h 14m 15s	6.35%	
6	Jean-Pierre Dick (FRA)	M	Virbac-Paprec (1)	98d 03h 49m 38s	10d 17h 01m 43s	12.25%	
7	Conrad Humphreys (GBR)	M	Hellomoto	104d 14h 32m 24s	17d 03h 44m 29s	19.62%	
8	Joé Seeten (FRA)	M	Arcelor Dunkerque	104d 23h 02m 45s	17d 12h 14m 50s	20.02%	
9	Bruce Schwab (USA)	M	Ocean Planet	109d 19h 58m 57s	22d 09h 11m 02s	25.59%	
10	Benoît Parnaudeau (FRA)	M	Max Havelaar / Best Western	116d 01h 06m 54s	28d 14h 18m 59s	32.7%	
11	Anne Liardet (FRA)	F	ROXY	119d 05h 28m 40s	31d 18h 40m 45s	36.34%	
12	Raphaël Dinelli (FRA)	M	Akena Verandas	125d 04h 07m 14s	37d 17h 19m 19s	43.14%	
13	Karen Leibovici (FRA)	F	Benefic	126d 08h 02m 20s	38d 21h 14m 25s	44.47%	
DNF(7)	Nick Moloney (AUS)	M	Skandia	Keel Failure (went back and completed passage)			
DNF(6)	Patrice Carpentier (FRA)	M	VM Matériaux (2)	broken boom			
DNF(5)	Marc Thiercelin (FRA)	M	Pro-Form	Outside assistance required in NZL (complete passage)			
DNF(4)	Roland Jourdain (FRA)	M	Sill Véolia (2)	keel problems			
DNF(3)	Norbert Sedlacek (AUT)	M	Brother	keel problems			
DNF(2)	Alex Thomson (GBR)	M	Hugo Boss	Hole in the deck			
DNF(1)	Hervé Laurent (FRA)	M	UUDS	rudder problem			
DNS	Patrick Favre (FRA)	M	Adrenalines				

== Entries ==
=== Participants gallery ===
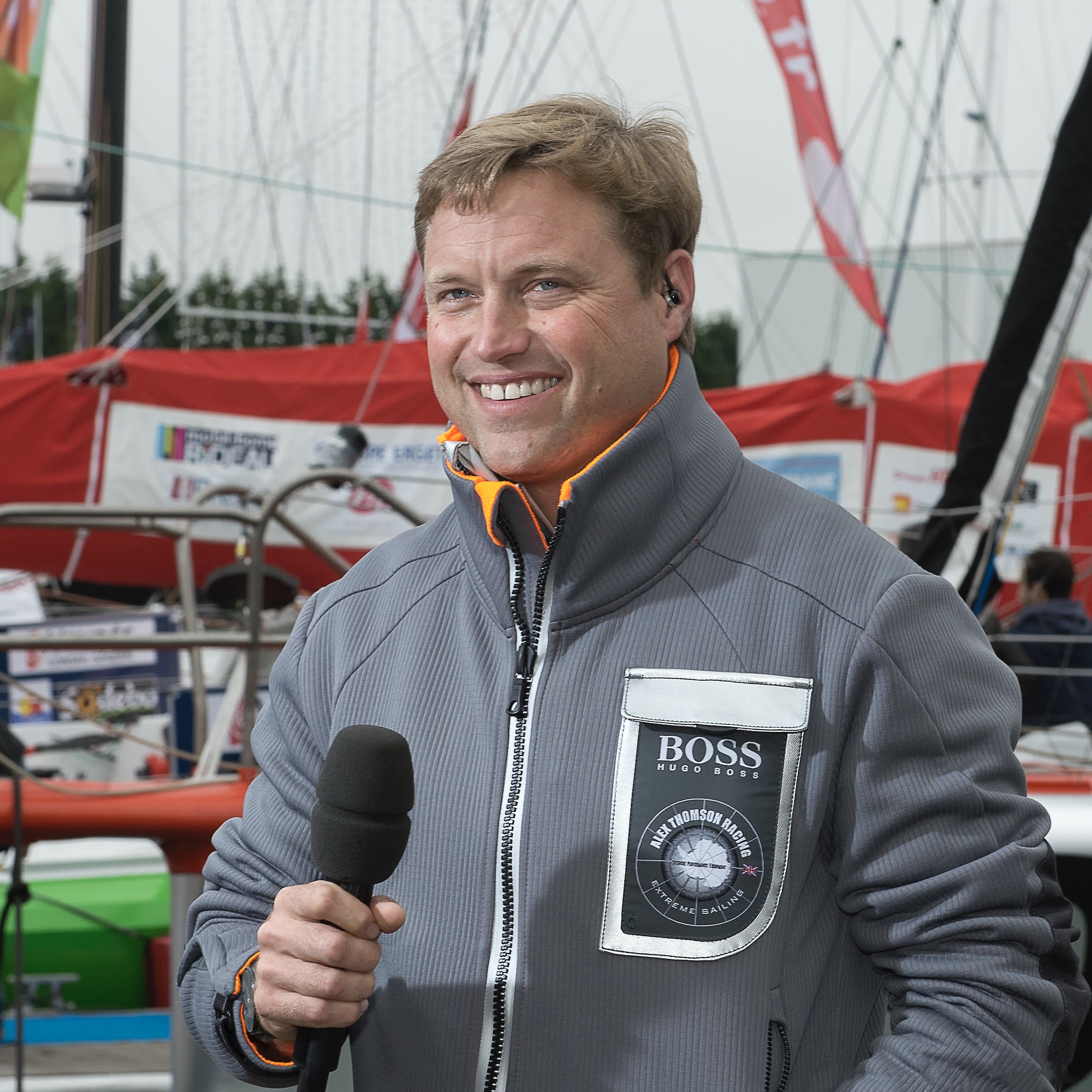
Alex Thomson (GBR)
Hugo Boss

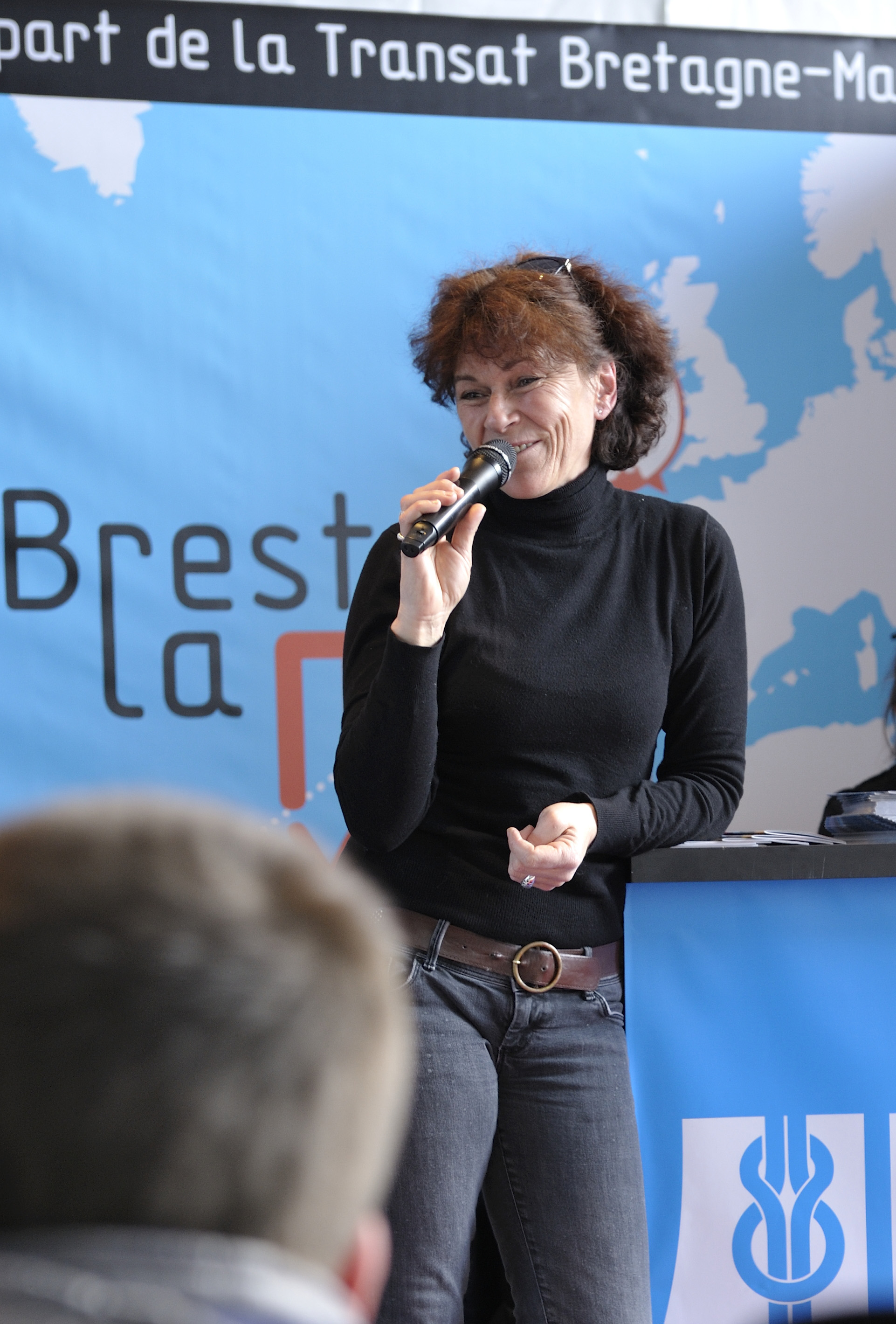
Anne Liardet (FRA)
ROXY

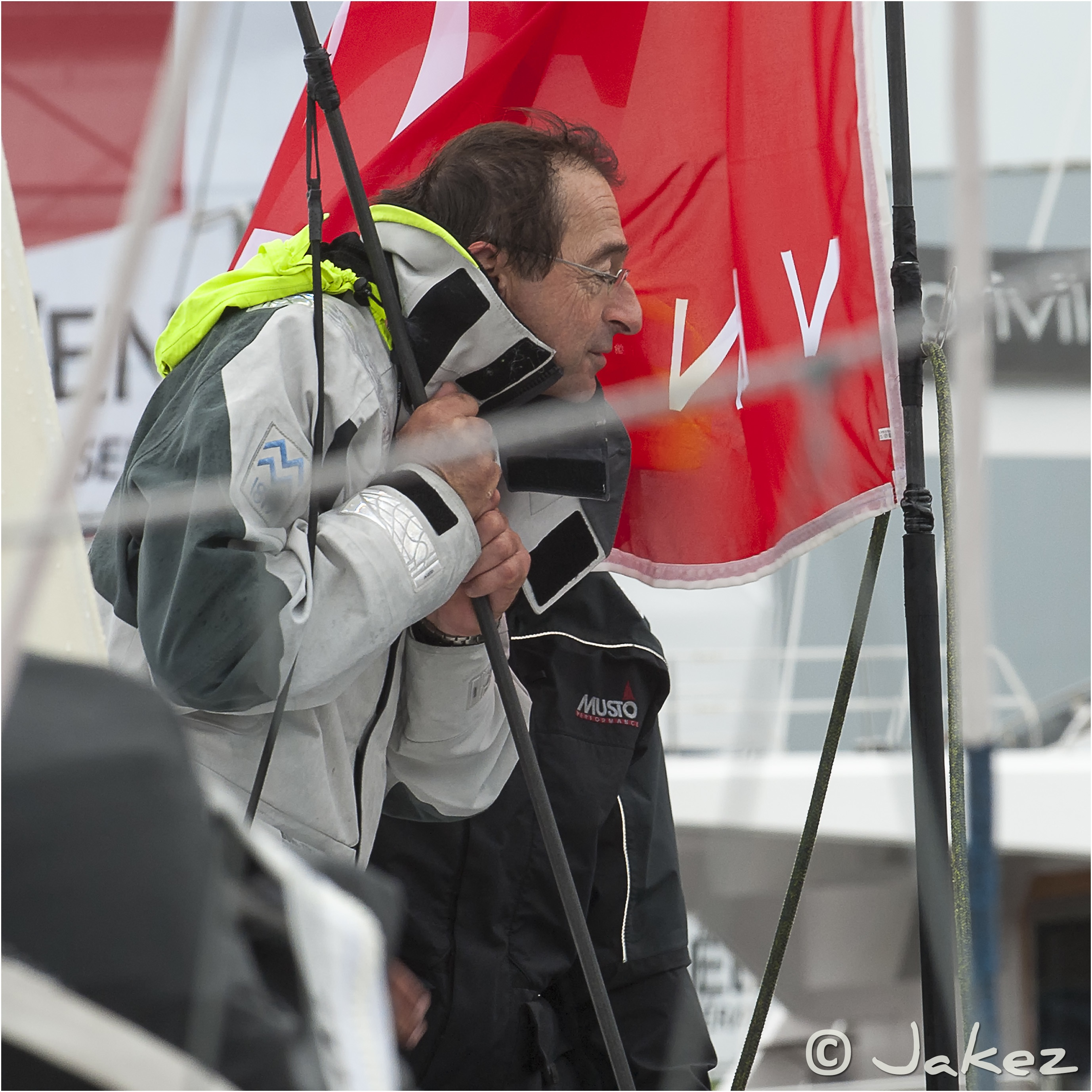
Dominique Wavre (SUI)
Temenos (1)

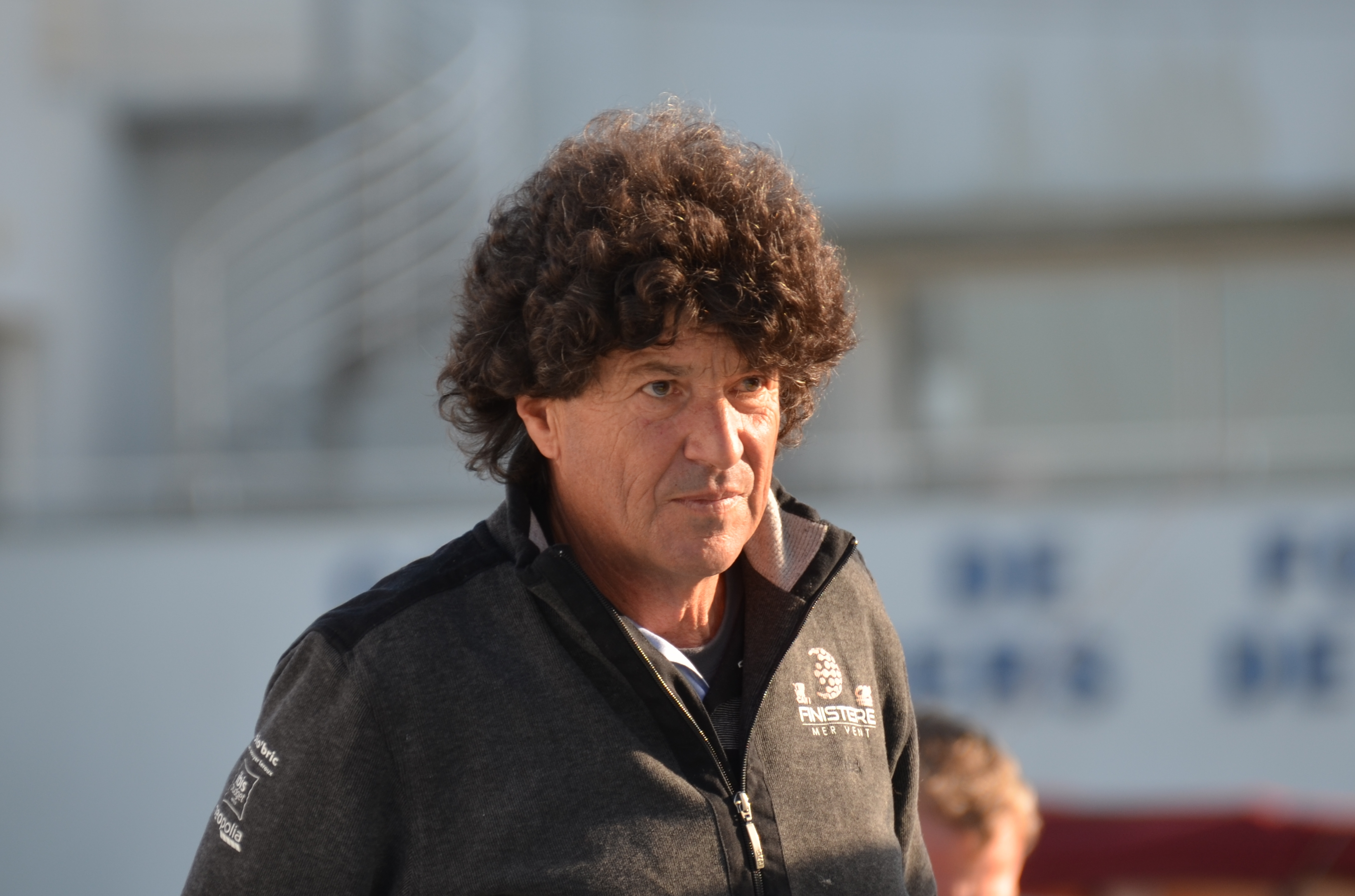
Jean Le Cam (FRA)
Bonduelle 2

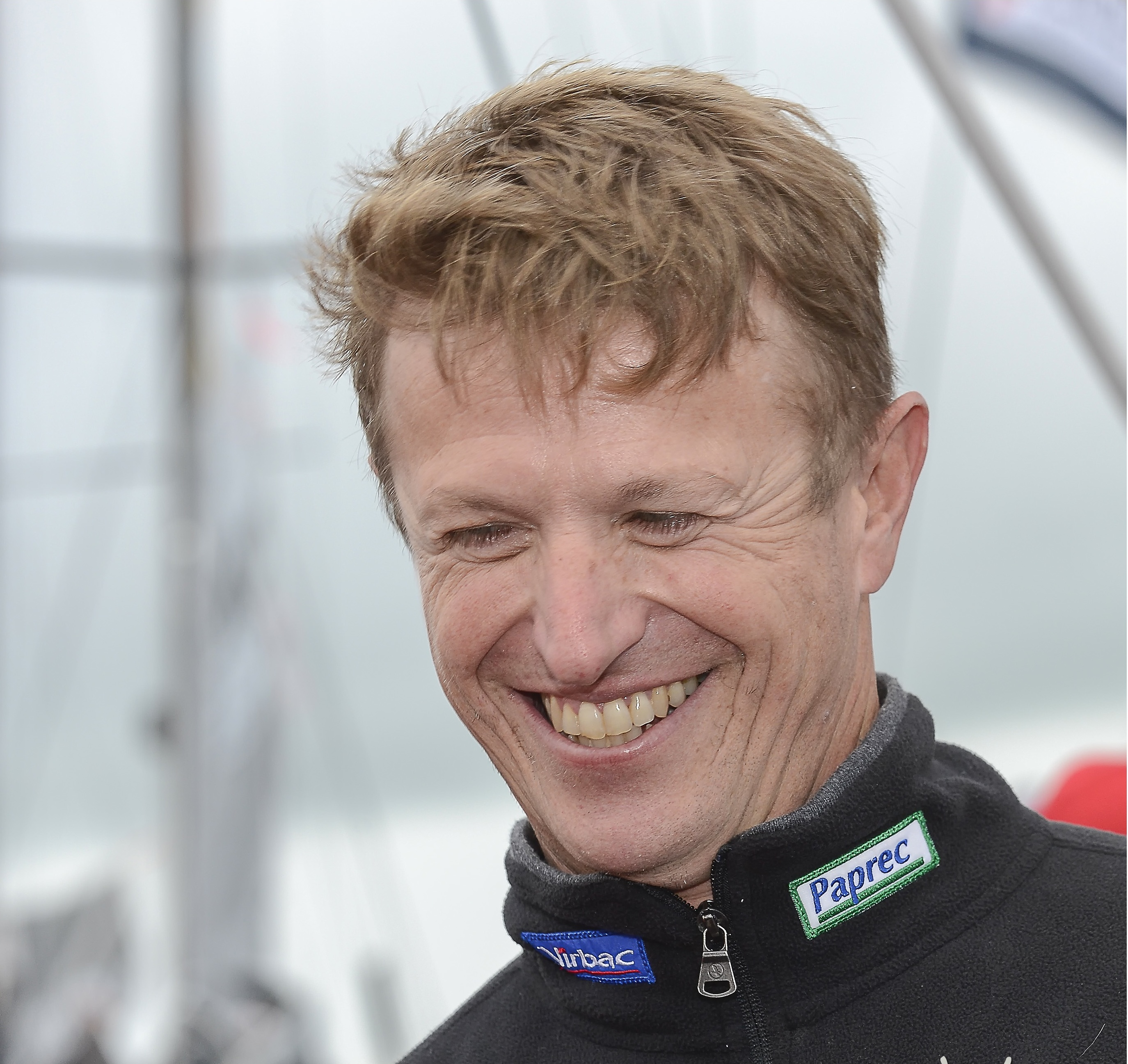
Jean-Pierre Dick (FRA)
Virbac-Paprec (1)

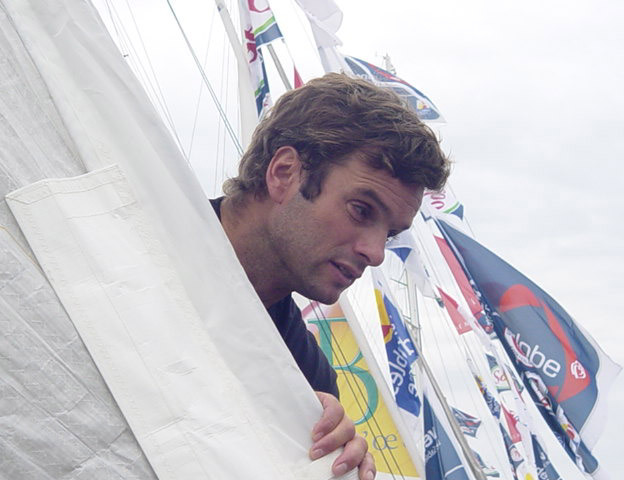
Marc Thiercelin (FRA)
Pro-Form

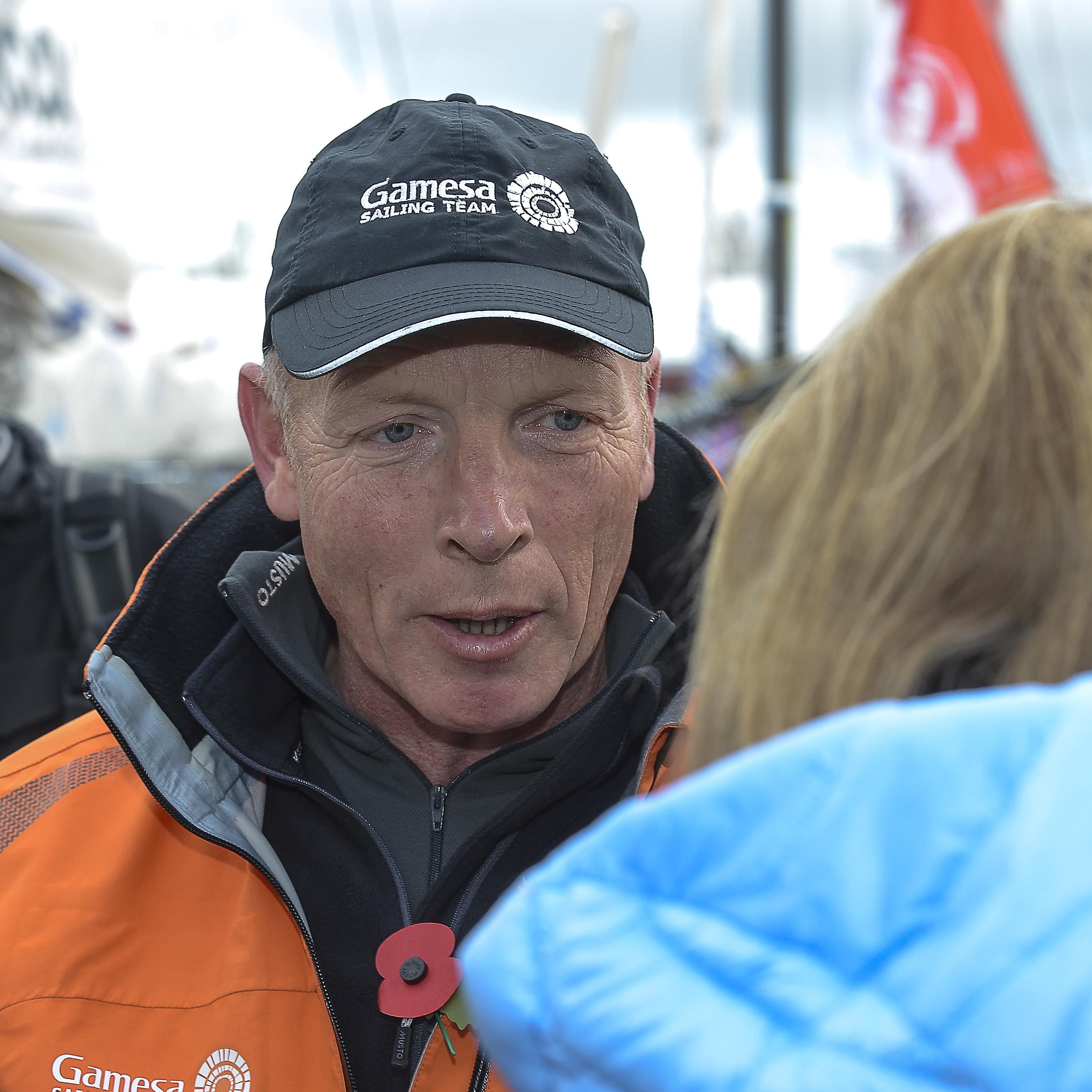
Mike Golding (GBR)
Ecover 2

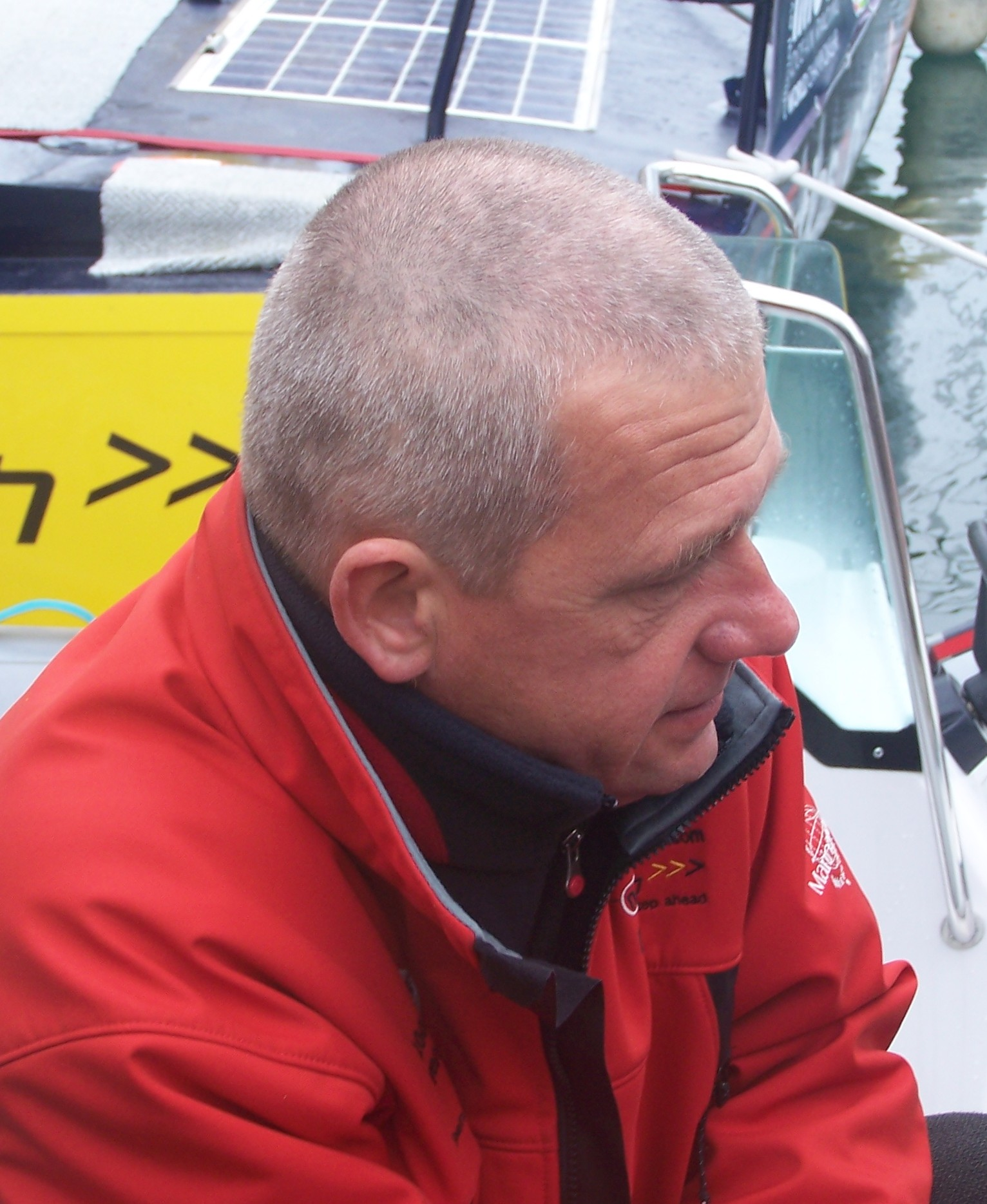
Norbert Sedlacek (AUT)
Brother

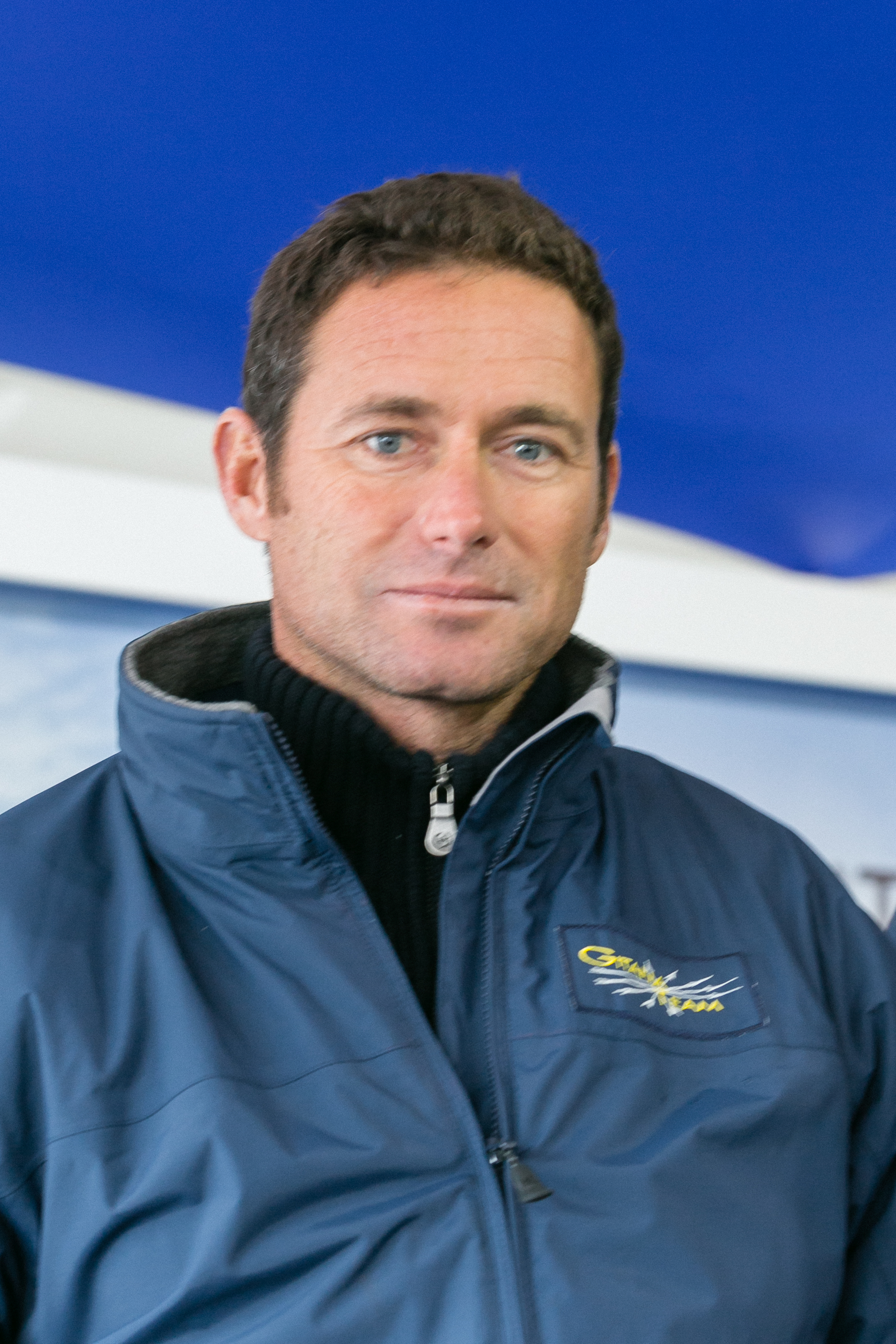
Sébastien Josse (FRA)
VMI

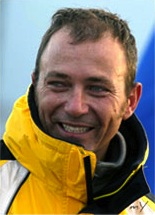
Raphaël Dinelli (FRA)
Akena Verandas

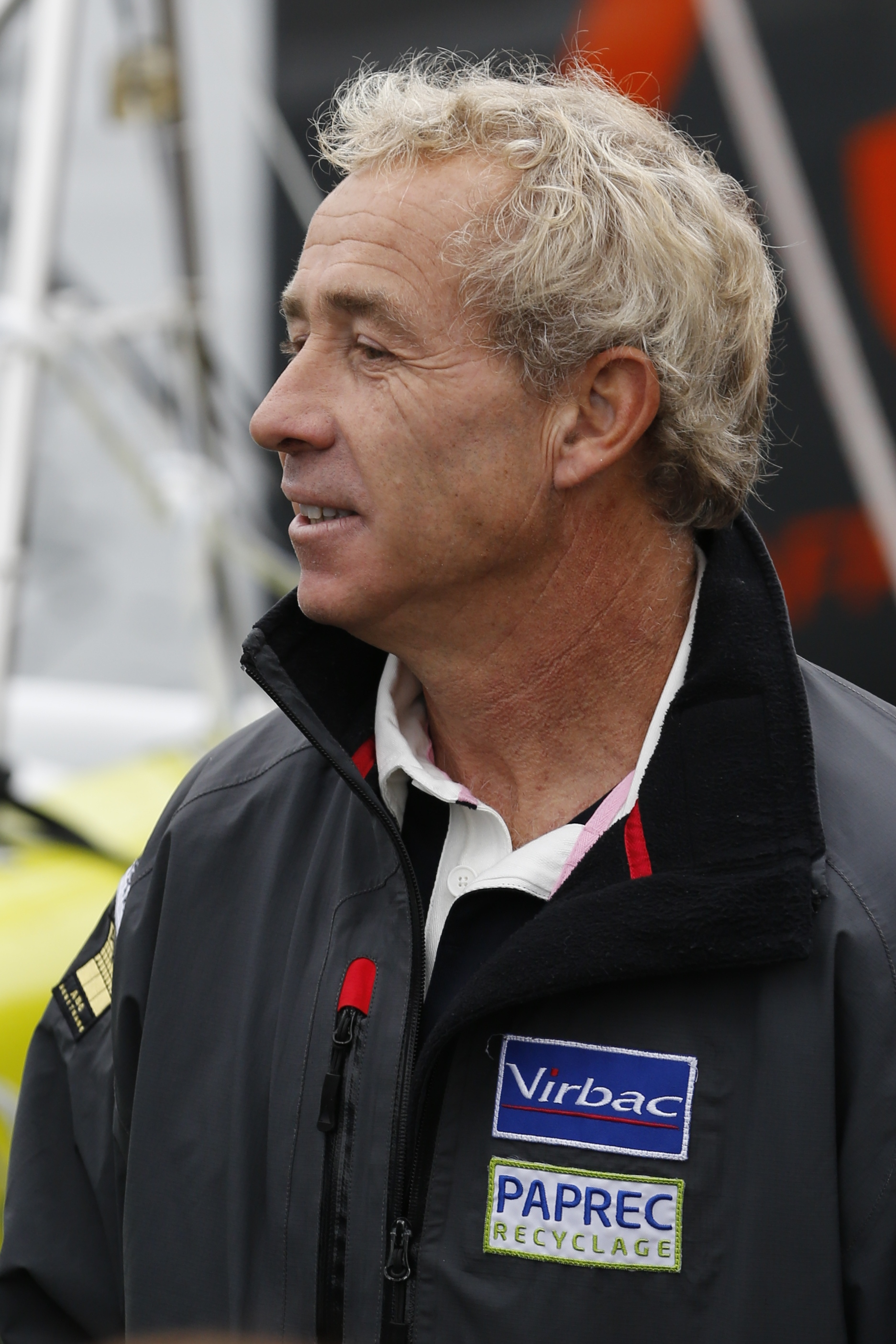
Roland Jourdain (FRA)
Sill Véolia (2)

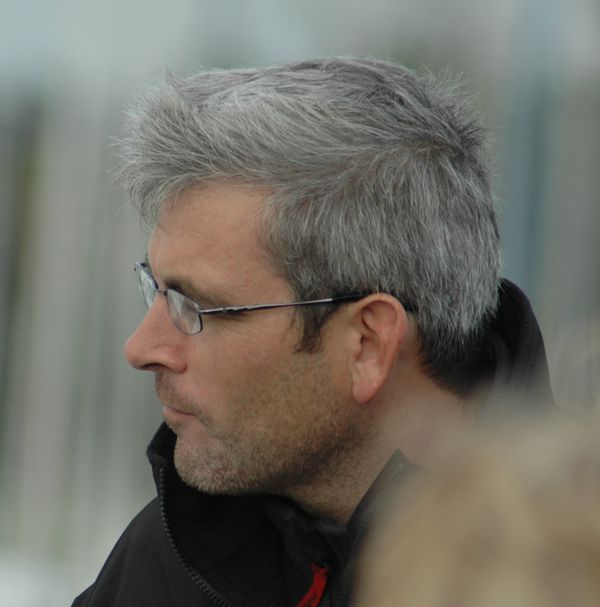
Vincent Riou (FRA)
PRB 2

=== Participant facts equipment ===
Twenty skippers started the race a qualification passage was required to validate the registration of each boat, this course could have been carried out as part of another sailing race.

Details on competitors and the boats used
Skipper	Nat.	Prev. participation (Start/Finish)	Name of boat	Naval architect	Builder	Launch date	Ref.
Alex Thomson	United Kingdom	Never	Hugo Boss	Marc Lombard	Mag France	1998	
Anne Liardet	France	Never	ROXY	Marc Lombard; Briand	Mag France	1989	
Bruce Schwab	United States	Never	Ocean Planet	Thomas Wylle	Schooner Creek Boat	2001	
Benoît Parnaudeau	France	Never	Max Havelaar / Best Western	Rowsell-Morisson	Rowsell-Morisson	1991	
Conrad Humphreys	United Kingdom	Never	Hellomoto	Finot-Conq		1998	
Dominique Wavre	Switzerland	1 / 1 (5th)	Temenos (1)	Finot-Conq		1999	
Jean-Pierre Dick	France	Never	Virbac-Paprec (1)	Farr yacht design		2003	
Jean Le Cam	France	Never	Bonduelle 2	Marc Lombard	JMV Industries	2004	
Karen Leibovici	France	Never	Benefic	Philippe Harlé; Alain Mortain	CDK Technologies	1991	
Hervé Laurent	France	1 / 1 (3rd)	UUDS	Finot-Conq	JMV Industries	1994	
Joe Seeten	France	1 / 1 (10th)	Arcelor-Dunkerque	Finot-Conq	JMV Industries	1998	
Marc Thiercelin	France	2 / 2 (2nd)	Pro Form	Marc Lombard	Mag France	1998	
Mike Golding	United Kingdom	1 / 1 (7th)	Ecover 2	Owen Clarke Design		2003	
Nick Moloney	Australia	Never	Skandia	Owen Clarke Design	Marten Yachts	2000	
Patrice Carpentier	France	2 / 1 (11th)	VM Matériaux (2)	Michel Joubert; Benoit Nivet		1999	
Raphaël Dinelli	France	2 / 0	Akena Verandas	Nándor Fa	Nandor Fa chantier	1996	
Roland Jourdain	France	1 / 1 (3rd)	Sill Véolia (2)	Marc Lombard	JMV Industries	2004	
Norbert Sedlacek	Austria	Never	Brother	Bernard Nivett	Chantier Norbert Sedlacek	1995	
Sébastien Josse	France	Never	VMI	Finot-Conq	Kirié / Éluère	1998	
Vincent Riou	France	Never	PRB 2	Finot-Conq	Mag France	2000	
