= IMOCA 60 Budapest =

Sailboat

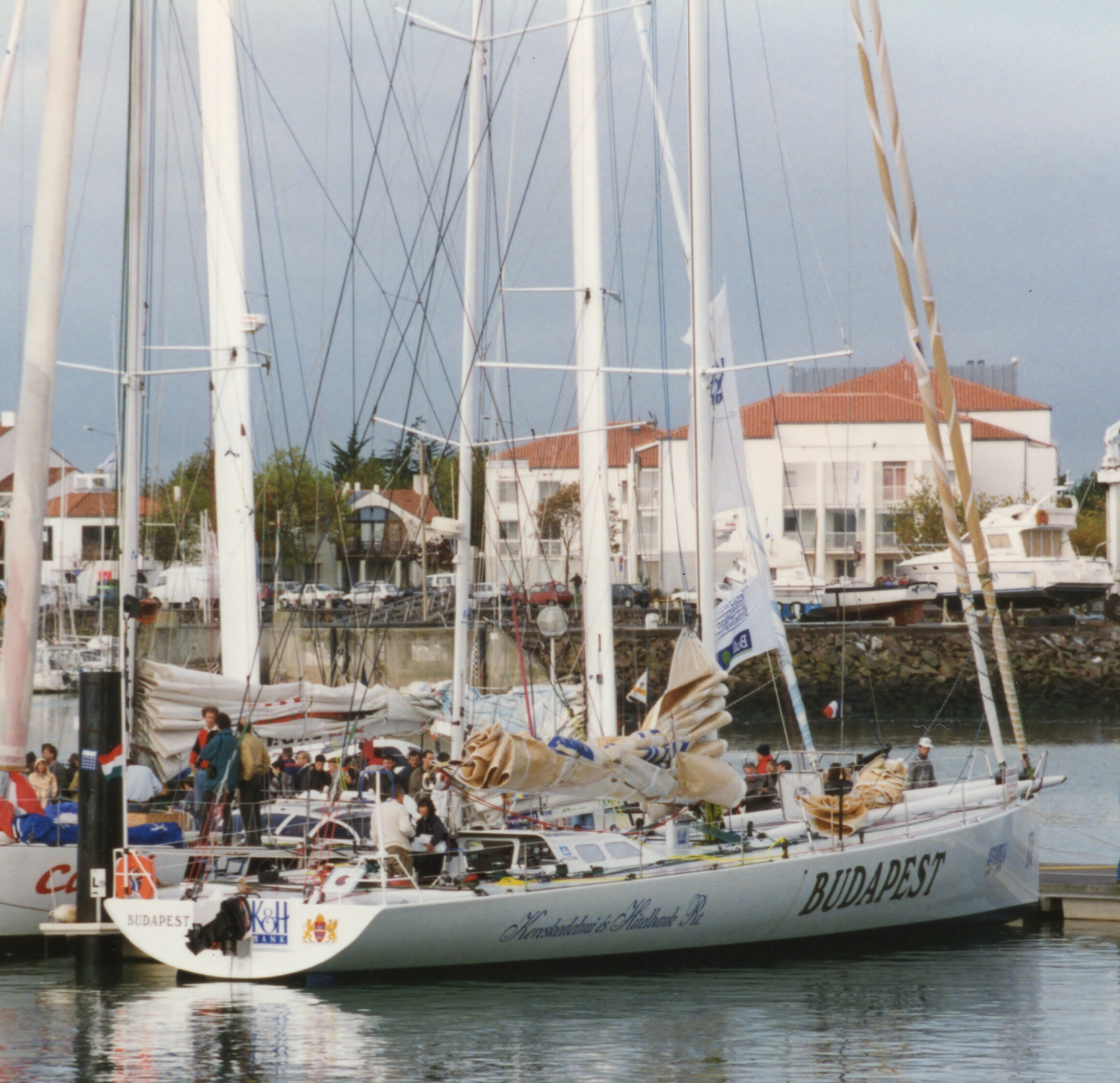

Development
- Designer: Nándor Fa
- Year: June 1996

Boat
- Displacement: 11,500 kg (25,400 lb)

Hull appendages
- Keel: Canting Keel
- Ballast: 3,750 kg (8,270 lb)
- Rudder: Twin Rudders

Rig
- Rig type: 3 spreader Sloop Rig

Sails
- Upwind sail area: 285 m^{2} (3,070 sq ft)
- Downwind sail area: 520 m^{2} (5,600 sq ft)

Racing
- Class association: IMOCA 60

The IMOCA 60 class yacht Budapest was designed and sailor Nandor Fa and launched in the 1996 and lost in 2018. What makes the boat rare is that it was designed by Nandor Fa the boats original skipper and owner.

== Racing results ==
Pos	Year	Race	Class	Boat name	Skipper	Notes	Ref
Round the world races
10 / 30	2008	2008–2009 Vendée Globe	IMOCA 60	Foundation Ocean Vital	Raphael Dinelli (ITA)	125d 02h 32m	
12 / 20	2004	2004–2005 Vendée Globe	IMOCA 60	SOGAL EXTENSO, 77	Raphael Dinelli (ITA)	125d 04h 37m 17s	
DNF	2000	2000–2001 Vendée Globe	IMOCA 60	SOGAL EXTENSO, 77	Raphael Dinelli (ITA)		
DNF	1996	1996–1997 Vendée Globe	IMOCA 60	Budapest	Nandor Fa (HUN)		
Transatlantic Races
Other Races

== Name / Ownership ==
=== Ending ===
The boat had a sad ending after the end of it life and was destroyed on 18 July 2018 off Saint Martin when the boat was set fire by the two crew sailing it and jump into the water as it was being surveillance at the time. They are recovered by customs officers who have also extinguished the fire (in two hours) and discover 1.5 tons of cocaine.
