= Bruce Schwab =

American sailor and ocean racer (born 1960)

Personal information
- Nationality: American
- Born: April 15, 1960 (age 65) Oxnard, California

Sport

Sailing career
- Class(es): IMOCA 60; Beneteau Figaro

Bruce Schwab (born April 15, 1960 in Oxnard, California) is an American sailor and ocean racer. He circumnavigated the globe twice on his Open 60 racing yacht OceanPlanet becoming the 240th and then the 254th solo sailor to do so. Schwab is the first American to officially complete the famous Vendée Globe Race (2004–2005).

== Early life ==
Born April 15, 1960 in Oxnard, California, Schwab moved to the Seattle area in 1965. He lived there until 1973 when he went on a three year cruise with his father and two younger brothers. While returning up the coast to Seattle in 1976, Bruce sailed with his father on the Gary Mull 42 (formerly "Improbable"). He graduated from Ballard High School in Seattle in 1978 and attended the University of Washington for a short time.

Schwab became a professional sailor, yacht rigger, and guitarist. He is famous for being the first American sailor to officially finish the Vendee Globe race in 2004–2005, a solo, nonstop, around the world yachting race sailing without assistance on Open 60 class boats, starting and finishing in Les Sables d'Olonne.

== Early career ==
Starting in 1979, Schwab spent a year in Santa Cruz racing ultralight displacement sailboats, including crewing on the Moore 24 "Ruby". He went on to start working and racing in the San Francisco Bay area in 1980. He began winning shorthanded races in 1983, including the Doublehanded Farallones, in which he eventually was an 8-time division winner. Bruce won his first singlehanded race, the Three Bridge Fiasco, in 1984 on "Svendle", a boat borrowed from his employer, Svend Svendsen of Svendsen's Boat Works. Schwab continued to win one design and PHRF races, with many wins and season championships, but had his most notable results in solo racing.

Schwab launched his highly modified 1930 30 Square Meter sloop, "Rumbleseat" at the end of 1993 after resurrecting the vessel from 13 years of dry storage. With Rumbleseat Schwab won the Singlehanded Farallones in 1994, and then the Singlehanded Transpac in 1996. Rumbleseat was the "Queen" guest boat at the 1997 Pacific Sail Expo boat show, and was eventually sold to well-known Caribbean sailor and cosmetic surgeon Dr. Robin Tattersall, OBE. In 1999, Schwab was awarded the US Sailing's Arthur B. Hanson rescue medal for participating in the rescue of a fellow racer who had capsized his boat in the Doublehanded Farallones Race.

== OceanPlanet ==
Working as a rigger at Svendsen's Boat Works allowed Schwab to learn many aspects of boat design, fabrication, painting, composites, and especially preparation for ocean racing. After having worked at Svendsen's for nearly 20 years, at the end of 1999 he left to form Rumbleseat Rigging. At that time he began efforts to design and build an Open 60 Class boat for the 2000 Vendee Globe Race — which no American had yet officially finished.

Schwab was not able to secure a title sponsor to build his new Open 60 (which is how Open 60 Class boats are typically built). Instead he formed the Made in America Foundation to raise funds and gained further grass roots support for the project. Schwab worked with designer Tom Wylie to develop the boat design which was built at Schooner Creek Boat Works in Portland, Oregon and christened OceanPlanet.

When Schwab fell short of his objective of having OceanPlanet ready for the 2000 Vendee Globe, fellow American solo Racer Brad Van Liew convinced Schwab to race the 2002–2003 Around Alone race (formerly the BOC Challenge and now the Velux 5 Oceans Race) upon the boats completion.

OceanPlanet had a narrow beam, seawater ballast, and an 80-foot unstayed and rotating carbon fiber mast. Schwab and Wylie discussed the factors that went into OceanPlanet's design in an interview with Latitude 38 Magazine in August 2001.

Schwab was the only American entered in the Around Alone Open 60 class, and also the only Class 1 entry without a title sponsor (Americans Brad Van Liew and Tim Kent raced in Class 2). In the first leg of the race (to Brixham, England), OceanPlanet's boom broke, requiring 1,000 nautical miles (1,900 km) of sailing without the mainsail to finish the leg. Later in the race, on leg 3 (Cape Town to New Zealand), Schwab suffered a water ballast tank leak which flooded the boat. On leg 4, to Brazil, the boat was hit by a giant breaking wave and the boom broke again. Schwab sailed around Cape Horn without the mainsail, stopping in Port Stanley in the Falkland Islands long enough to repair the boom. Schwab made it to the finish of the Around Alone in Newport, Rhode Island on May 5, 2003 becoming the 240th person to solo circumnavigate the globe.

== The Vendee Globe ==
After completing the Around Alone race, Schwab set out to modify his Open 60 racing yacht to prepare for the nonstop Vendee Globe race in 2004–2005, bringing her up to the technical standards of the International Monohull Open Class Association (IMOCA). The race, starting in Les Sables D'olonne, France, required the sailors to race through the "Roaring Forties" and "Furious Fifties" latitudes. Dangers faced ranged from hitting an iceberg to the high velocity unchecked waves. On February 25, 2005, Schwab completed the Vendee Globe in 9th place becoming the first American to officially finish and the 254th person to solo circumnavigate the globe, with an official time of 109 days, 19 hours, 58 minutes and 57 seconds. This included a sustained average speed of 17.9 knots for over 6 hours, single-handed. Schwab maintained media contact during the race participating in 29 interviews with Ronn Barr of Sports Byline Radio. During the race Schwab operated the OceanPlanet Foundation as an educational forum, as thousands of students and sailors followed the boat and expanded their knowledge of sailing.

== Current career ==
Prior to handing OceanPlanet to a new owner in September 2009, Schwab provided offshore training aboard the boat and other vessels, mentoring several crews of sailors to improve their ocean sailing skills. Schwab is currently based in Portland, Maine and runs "Bruce Schwab Rigging and Systems LLC".

Schwab is a performing guitarist and participates in bicycle racing. He is currently working on the development of lithium iron phosphate batteries, which represent a development in safe, high density energy storage in marine and other applications.
