= Joé Seeten =

French offshore sailor and navigator

Personal information
- Nationality: French
- Born: 31 May 1957 (age 69) Dunkirk

Sailing career
- Sport: Sailing
- Class(es): Bénéteau Figaro, IMOCA 60

Joé Seeten is a French sailor born on 31 May 1957 in Dunkirk.

== Biography ==
He discovered sailing thanks to his father, who acquired his first boat in 1967. Joé has had a passion for sailing ever since. He trained as an electric technician. He set up his company, La Voilerie, where for seventeen years he designed and produced sails. At the same time he participates in numerous crew races (Tour de France à la voile, Quarter Tonner World Championship, Discovery Route, Trans-Atlantic Twostar) which allows him to evaluate and prove his sails.

From 1989 to 1993 he sailing in Beneteau First Class 8 series finishing third in the French Championships and then in the European Championship where he finished third.

In 1995 started professionally solo race for four year in the highly competitive Figaro Class, before progressing onto the IMOCA 60 and in 2000 he competed in the pinnacle offshore solo event the round the world race the Vendée Globe onboard hid yacht "Nord-pas-de-Calais/chocolats du Monde".

In 2006 while competing in the Route du Rhum he activated his distress beacon after finding serious keel problems to his Class 40 yacht TMI Technologies. He also reported an injured shoulder that needed medical attention. The Bahamas-registered tanker Stavanger Eagle diverted and rescued him.

== Rankings ==
Year	Pos.	Event	Class	Boat name	Note	Ref.
1979	1	Tour de France à la voile	First 30	Dunkirk	with Bertrand Pacé and crew	
1980	1	Tour de France à la voile	First 30	Dunkirk	with Damien Savatier and crew	
1981	1	Tour de France à la voile	First 30	Dunkirk	with Damien Savatier and crew	
1981	6	Trans-Atlantic Twostar				
1981	2	Discovery Route				
1984	1	Quarter Tonner World Champion				
1987	1	Tour de France à la voile	Sélection			
1988	WR	Record speed of the crossing of the English Channel			with 17.2 knots	
1989	3	French First Class 8 Championship	Bénéteau First Class 8			
1990	3	French First Class 8 Championship	Bénéteau First Class 8			
1992	5	First Class 8 European Championship	Bénéteau First Class 8			
1993	3	European First Class 8 Championship	Bénéteau First Class 8			
1995	6	Solitaire du Figaro	Bénéteau Figaro			
1997	11	Solitaire du Figaro	Bénéteau Figaro			
2000	10	Europe 1 Newman Star		Nord-pas-de-Calais		
2000	10	2000-2001 Vendée Globe	IMOCA 60	Nord-pas-de-Calais/chocolats du Monde		
2001	10	Transat Jacques-Vabre	IMOCA 60	Sollac Atlantic	with Éric Drouglazet	
2002	3	2002 Route du Rhum	IMOCA 60	Arcelor Dunkirk		
2003	8	2003 Transat Jacques-Vabre	IMOCA 60	Arcelor Dunkirk	with Éric Dumont	
2003	6	2003 Atlantic Challenge	IMOCA 60	Arcelor Dunkirk		
2005	8	2004-2005 Vendée Globe	IMOCA 60	Arcelor Dunkirk		
2005	9	2005 Transat Jacques-Vabre	IMOCA 60	Mare Verticale	with Cecilia Carreri	
2006	ABN	2002 Route du Rhum	Class 40			
