= Norbert Sedlacek =

Austrian adventurer and offshore sailor

Norbert Sedlacek Koch
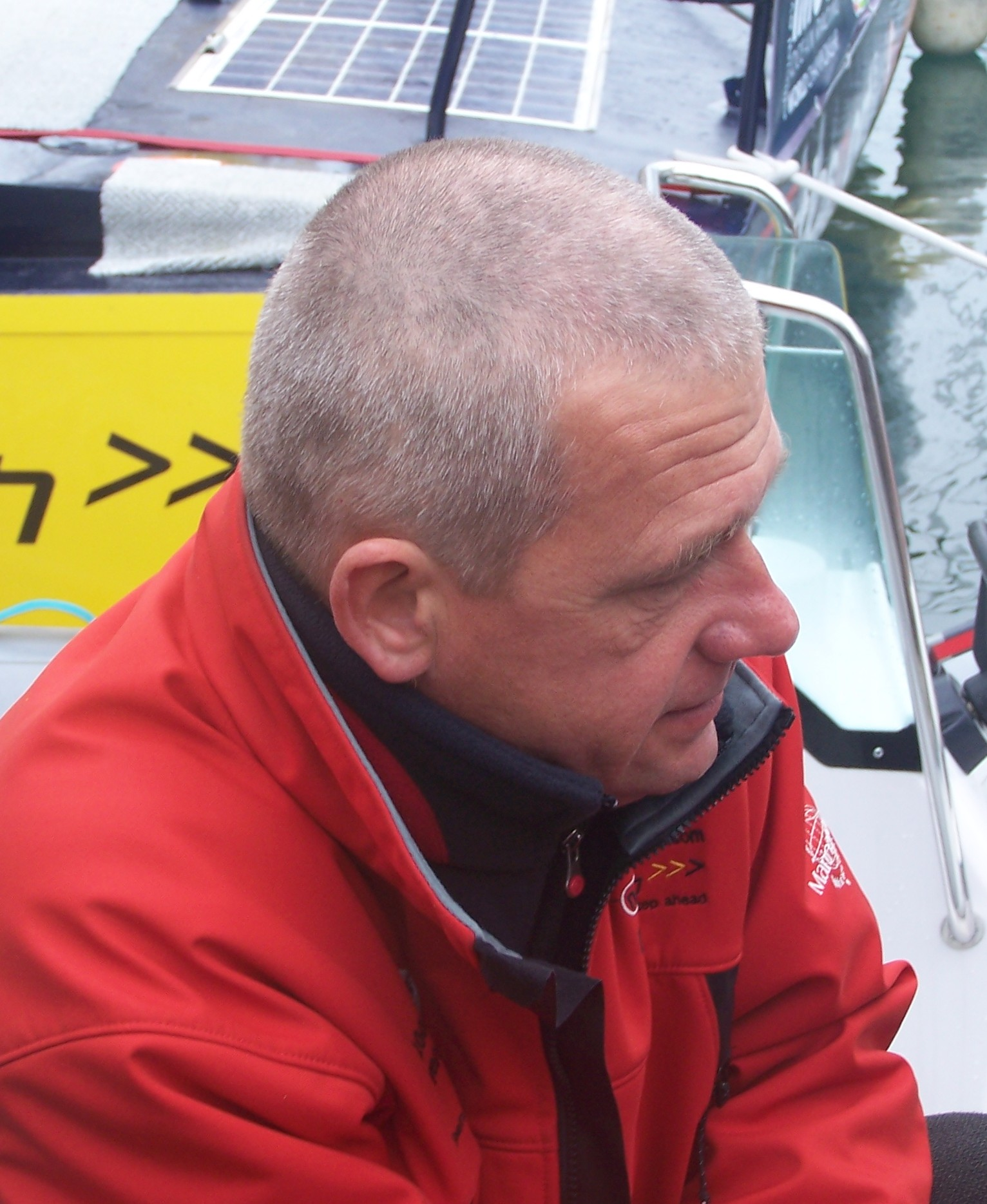
- Norbert Sedlacek Koch

Personal information
- Born: 27 January 1962 (age 64) Nantes

Sailing career
- Sport: Sailing
- Class: IMOCA 60

Norbert Sedlacek Koch is an Austrian adventurer and offshore sailor born on 27 January 1962 in Vienna.

== Biography ==
This former tram driver and taekwondo champion has been devoted entirely to sailing since 1996.

== Sailing challenges ==
=== 1996–1998 – First Circumnavigation ===
Between 1996 and 1998 in just under 2 years he completed a solo single-handed circumnavigation starting from the Italian Port of Grado covering approximately 26,000 nautical miles. The voyage was completed on a small 8.4m sloop designed by himself called Wolf 766. He was the first Austrian sailor to sail around the world.

=== 2000 Antarctic Ice Limit Circumnavigation ===
In November 2000 he started a solo non-stop around Antarctica circumnavigation from Cape Town to Cape Town. He completed the voyage in 93 days covering 14315 nm through the most dangerous oceans full of icebergs.

=== 2004 and 2008 Vendee Globe Race ===
He took part in the pinnacle solo non stop round the world race in the 2004–2005 Vendée Globe edition, but had to abandon due to keel problems. He returned for the next edition 2008–2009 Vendée Globe finished 11th and last (though thirty competitors started the race). In order to gain experience on his IMOCA 60 class boat he came 10 out of 17 finisher in the Transat 2004 from Plymouth (GB) to Boston (USA).

=== Further Sailing Challenged ===
In 2013 he attempted to cross the Atlantic on a smallest boat made of recycled materials.

In 2021 he plans to start a 34,000 nautical mile odyssey "ANT ARCTIC LAB" project which involved being the first to attempt to sail nonstop, single-handed and without assistance around the world through all five oceans, including Arctic and Southern Ocean.
