= Benoît Parnaudeau =

French offshore sailor and navigator

Personal information
- Nationality: French
- Born: 14 July 1972 (age 53) Sherbrooke, Quebec, Canada

Sailing career
- Sport: Sailing

Benoit Parnaudeau (born 14 July 1972) is a Canadian-born French sailor.

== Biography ==
He was born in Sherbrooke, Quebec, but grow up living in La Rochelle, and has a bachelor's degree in mathematics.

He has been heavily involved in the offshore scene before getting his break as a skipper as he prepared boats of Isabelle Autissier, Christophe Auguin, Didier Munduteguy and more.

He completed in the 2004-2005 Vendee Globe.

In 2005 he built a Class 40 for the Route du Rhum called Bio-Forer planning Gardens. He finished 14th in class.

== Career highlights ==
Year	Pos	Race	Class	Boat name	Notes	Ref.
1997	17	Mini Transat	Mini Transat 6.50			
1998	8	Triangle of the Sun				
2001	2	mini Fastnet	Mini Transat 6.50	Good Foot - Good Eye		
2001	2	Transgascogne				
2001	8	Mini-Pavois	Mini Transat 6.50			
2001	11	Transat 6.5	Mini Transat 6.50			
2003	3	Mini Fastnet	Mini Transat 6.50			
2003	8	Atlantic Challenge				
2005	10	2004-2005 Vendée Globe	IMOCA 60	Max Havelaar/Best Western		
2006	14	Route du Rhum	Class 40	Bio-Forer planning Gardens		
2007	2	Les Sables-Madeère-Les Sables		Jardins Bio-Proser	with Jean-Christophe Caso	
2007	2	1000 Miles Brittany Ferries		Bio-ForecastIng Doubles Gardens	with Jean-Christophe Caso	
2007	21	2007 Transat Jacques-Vabre	Class40	Jardins Bio-Proser	with Jean-Christophe Caso	
2008	8	Artemis Transat	Class40	Bio-Forer planning Gardens		
2008	RET	Halifax Marblehead	Class40	Bio-Forecast Gardens	with Ann Mai Do Chi, Isis Parnaudeau, Peter Dowd	
2008	5	Transat Québec-Saint-Malo	Class40	Bio-Forerate Gardens		
2008	RET	1000 Miles Brittany Ferries	Class40	Bio-Foreration Gardens	with Nicolas Boidevezi	
2009	9	LES SABLES - HORTA - LES SABLES	Class40	Bio-Foreration Gardens	with Jean SAUCET	
2009	ABN	LA SOLIDAIRE DU CHOCOLAT	Class40	Bio-Foreration Gardens	with Stanislas MASLARD	
2010	6	RECORD SNSM	Class40	Bio-Foreration Gardens		
2011	9	RECORD SNSM	Class40	Bio-Foreration Gardens	with Xavier HILL	
2011		ROLEX FASTNET RACE	Class40	Bio-Foreration Gardens	with Bernard AVERTY, Arthur CHABERNAUD, Ricardo DINIZ	
2012		LA SOLIDAIRE DU CHOCOLAT	Class40	Bio-Foreration Gardens	with Benoit JOUANDET	
2012		TRANSAT QUEBEC - SAINT MALO	Class40	Bio-Foreration Gardens	with Christophe LEBAS, Salvatore IANNELLO, Renaud CHAVARRIA	
