= Anne Liardet =

French sailor

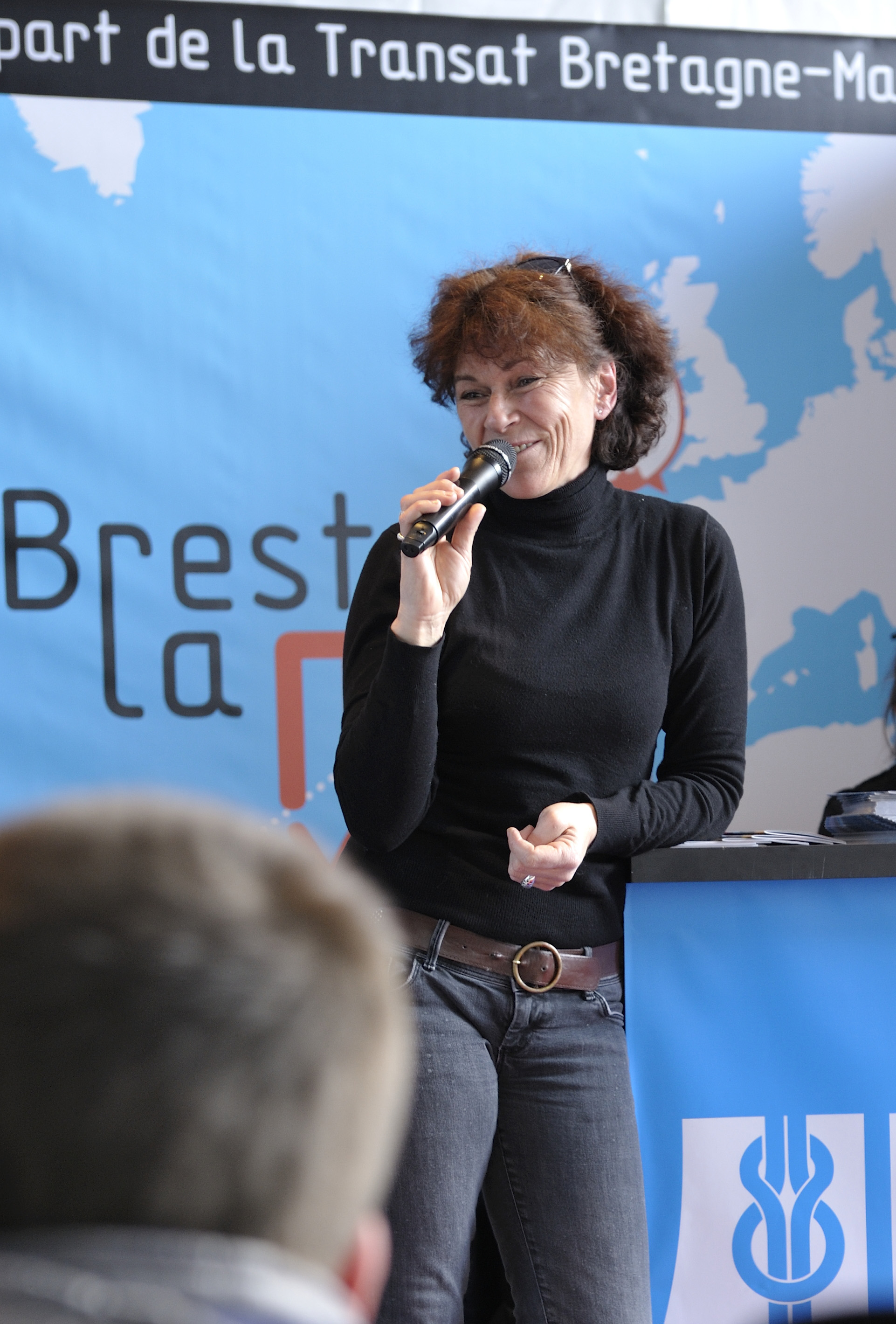

Personal information
- Nationality: French
- Born: 16 April 1961 (age 64) Bourges

Sport

Sailing career
- Class: IMOCA 60

Anne Liardet (born April 16, 1961 in Bourges) is a French female offshore professional sailor.

== Biography ==
Her father is a teacher who moved to teach at Brest Graduate School of Arts when she was one year old. The family moved to Sainte-Anne-du-Portzic she was introduced to sailing by her father. After leaving school she started work for a sailmaker but within two years she moved into working in a boatyards preparation ocean racing boats. Working in the world of offshore racing at a shipyard and then on various sailing yacht she already imagines herself aboard the boats she prepares. She is the mother of three children Morgan, Manon and Margot, whom she had with partner and fellow offshore sailor Jo Le Guen where they live in Daoulas, Finistère.

== Sailing career ==
She is the third woman to finish a Vendée Globe solo yacht race following Catherine Chabaud in 1997 and Ellen MacArthur in 2001. She attempted to return to professional sailing to compete in the 2012-2013 Vendee Globe but failed to raise the funds. In 2021 she returned to offshore sailing mounting a Mini Transat campaign.

== Results highlights ==
Pos	Year	Race	Class	Boat name	Notes	Ref.
	1983	Brest-Bermuda-Brest		Pen Duick VI		
1	1985	2 Person Mini Transat	Mini Transat 6.50		with B Audrezet	
10	1985	Mini Transat Race	Mini Transat 6.50	Piz Buin	1st woman	
1	1985	Mini Fastnet solo	Mini Transat 6.50			
24	1986	Solitaire du Figaro	Beneteau Figaro	Normerel	1st in a standard boat	
2	1987	100 miles of Concarneau		Normerel		
9	1987	Half Ton Cup	Half Ton Class	Normerel	held in La Rochelle	
10	1987	Solitaire du Figaro	Beneteau Figaro			
	1990	Route du Rhum	Multi	CTL		
9	2003	Atlantic Challenge			(Bahia - La Rochelle)	
12	2004	The Transat	IMOCA 60	Quiksilver		
8	2005	Transat Jacques Vabre	IMOCA 60	Roxy (1)	19d 14h 24m with Miranda Merron (GBR)	
11	2005	Rolex Fastnet Race	IMOCA 60	Roxy (1)		
11	2005	2004–2005 Vendée Globe	IMOCA 60	Roxy (1)		
8	2006	Route du Rhum	IMOCA 60	Roxy (2)		
2	2007	Transat Jacques Vabre	Class40	40 Degrees	with Peter Harding (GBR)	
