= Conrad Humphreys =

British yachtsman and motivational speaker

Conrad David Humphreys (born 13 February 1973) is a British professional yachtsman and motivational speaker.

Humphreys has competed in three round the world races (Whitbread Round the World Race 1993–94 and the BT Global Challenge 2000–2001) and (Vendee Globe 2004–05) He has also competed in the Transat (2004), the Route du Rhum (2002, 2014), the Transat Jacques Vabre (2003), the Archipelago Raid (2008–2011) the Extreme Sailing Series (2005–2007) and La Solitaire du Figaro (2011).

Humphreys was the sailing master for the Channel 4's re-creation of Captain William Bligh's voyage from Tonga to Timor.

== Early life and education ==
Humphreys was born in Exeter, Devon on 13 February 1973, the youngest of four siblings. Growing up in Exmouth, Humphreys played competitive rugby for Exmouth Rugby Club and for the County of Devon . As part of the Exmouth Sailing Club, he competed in two Cadet world championships, winning the Junior Worlds in the Netherlands 1989 and finishing 6th at the 1990 Cadet Worlds in Poland. Humphreys was then invited to join a youth team for the Fastnet in 1991. The team skippered by Matt Humphries won.

Humphreys attended Exeter College, initially training to become a journalist. However, he left college at 19 to join a team for the Whitbread Round the World Race in 1993–94. Humphreys later attended the University of Plymouth where he graduated in 1997 with a BSc in Ocean Science and Meteorology. Humphreys received an Honorary Master of Science from Plymouth University in 2005.

== Professional career ==
In 2001, Humphreys founded Sport Environment, a sports marketing consultancy for both sailing and outdoor events. He was a board member of Sport England.

Humphreys is also a motivational speaker and coach.

== Sailing career ==
While at Plymouth University, Humphreys skipped the college sailing team to winning the BUSA Student Yachting Nationals and finishing 2nd at World Championships. In 1997. Humphreys won the Fastnet race again with Ross Field on board the Ericsson 80 "Banque Internationale Luxembourg".

At the end of his studies, he applied for a place to Skipper one of the BT Global Challenge 72's in the 2000–2001 edition of the race. Humphreys and his LG FLATRON team went on to dominate the race setting a record pace and winning four out of seven legs. At just 26 years of age, Humphreys became the youngest winning skipper in the history of the race.

In 2001, Humphreys teamed up with Mike Golding as navigator for the EDS Atlantic Challenge, competing two transatlantic crossings and finishing 3rd in the inaugural edition of the race. He later joined Will Oxley for the 2001 edition of the Rolex Sydney Hobart Race and went onto race in the Sydney Hobart as navigator for Commodore, CYCA, Matt Allan's Ichiban 70 in the next five editions of the race, coming close to winning the race overall in 2003.

In 2003, Humphreys secured sponsorship with Motorola for the Transat Jacques Vabre and raced double-handed with Australian speedster Paul Larsen. The duo won the 50 ft class by over 500 miles. The result gave him the opportunity to pitch a campaign to Motorola for the 2004–05 Vendee Globe.

On 20 February 2005, Humphreys became only the 5th British sailor to complete the Vendée Globe. He finished 7th after 104 days at sea in what has been acknowledged as one of the most remarkable comebacks in the history of the Vendée Globe race.

Humphreys would later sell his Open 60, Hellomoto to yachtswoman Dee Caffari and moved into the Extreme 40 Class again with Motorola competing in the inaugural edition of the Volvo Extreme Sailing Series during the Volvo Ocean Race. Humphreys selected Leigh McMillan as Helmsman for the campaign, which would see them finish 3rd overall, winning the final event in Rotterdam.

Multihull sailing was taking off and as the Extreme Sailing Series grew, Humphreys teamed with DMS as main partner for the Archipelago Raid 2007. The Scandinavian event is an endurance race in small 18 ft Formula 18 catamarans. Humphreys and teammate Ryan, would sail 4 editions of the Archipelago Raid, finishing 4th in the 2008 edition of the race.

In 2011, Humphreys again teamed up with sponsor, DMS for the La Solitaire du Figaro, the unofficial World Championships for single-handed sailing. Humphreys sailed under the banner of the Artemis Academy which was set up by OC Sport to support talented solo sailors.

After a break from solo sailing, Humphreys returned to race in the 2014 edition of the Route du Rhum with the Class 40, sponsored by Cat Phones and Bullitt Group. After a difficult start to the race, he suffered a dismasting 400 miles west of Lisbon and had to retire from the race.

== Mutiny – recreating Captain Bligh's epic voyage of survival ==
In 2016, Humphreys was recruited to be the professional skipper on board the ambitious recreation of Captain Bligh's 4000 mile voyage in an open 23 foot boat from Tonga to Timor for Channel 4. Using traditional navigation equipment and surviving off the same meagre rations as Bligh, a team of nine men led by former SBS trooper Anthony Middleton were cast adrift to recreate one of the world's greatest open boat voyages of British history.

== Charity work ==
In 2007, Humphreys founded the Blue Project, a social enterprise to encourage people to connect and protect our blue environment. Between 2007 and 2017, the Blue Project (now Blue Foundation) celebrated a number of achievements, including creating the award-winning Blue Mile, a series of watersports and educational events that immersed participants across the UK and promoted environmental conservation. The Blue Project supported leading charities, WWF, Marine Conservation Society and the Shark Trust by raising funds to support their work.

Humphreys is a trustee of the Island Sailing Trust, a local sailing charity that supports young, disabled and disadvantaged children by taking them sailing on three classic yachts, Pegasus, Moosk and Tectona.

== Personal life ==
Humphreys married Vikki Cheung in 2002 and they have two children, Katelyn and Isabel. They live in Brixham, South Hams, Devon.

== Sources ==
- Morris, Jonathan, A tough life on the ocean waves,, BBC News Online, 28 May 2004
- Yachtsman joins green project, Exmouth Herald, 24 August 2008
