= Raphaël Dinelli =

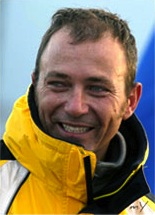

Personal information
- Born: Floirac, Gironde.

Sailing career
- Sport: Sailing
- Class: IMOCA 60

Raphaël Dinelli (born in Floirac, Gironde) is a French professional offshore sailor. He took part in the 1996-1997 Vendee Globe where he was rescued by Pete Goss after his boat sank in the Indian Ocean and he was in a liferaft dropped by an Australian Air Force plane. He was racing unofficially as the organisers ruled he had insufficient experience. He went on to sail with Goss in the 1997 edition of the two person transatlantic race Transat Jacques Vabre where they won their class. He then went on to compete in the 2000, 2004 and 2008 editions of the Vendee Globe. In 2007, he founded the Ocean Vital Foundation, of which he is the director of research.

== Gallery ==
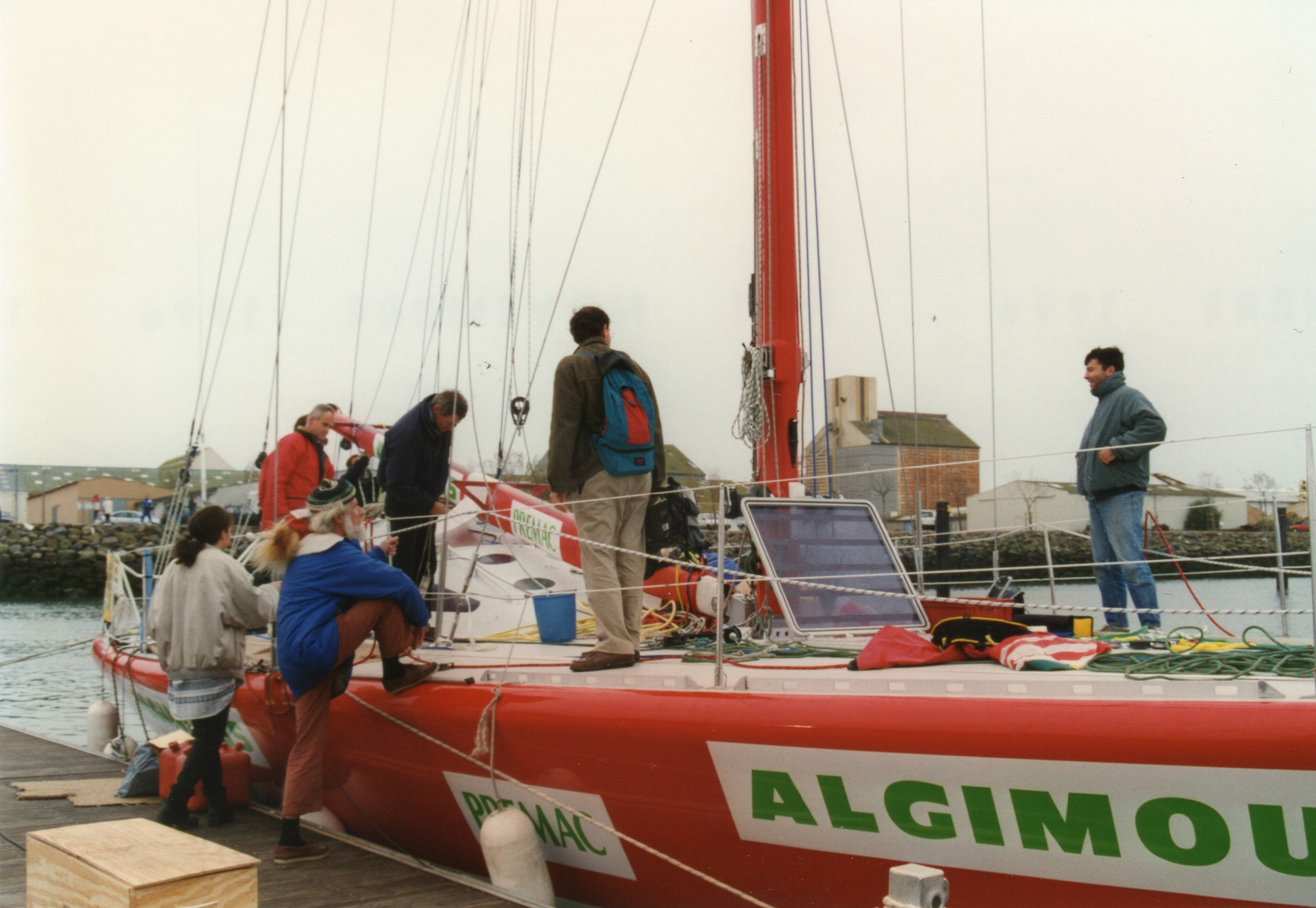

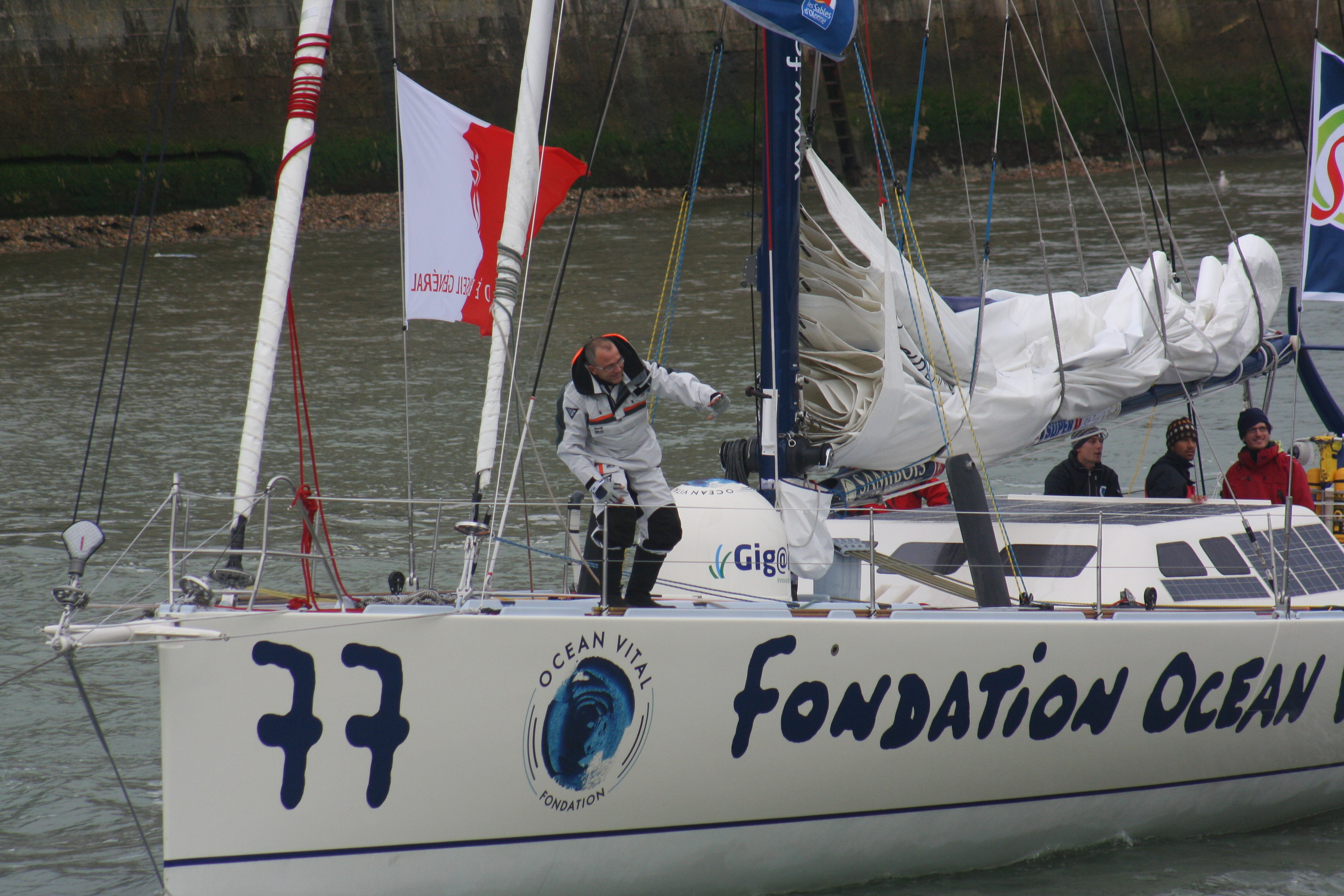
Departure of Vendée Globe 2008/2009

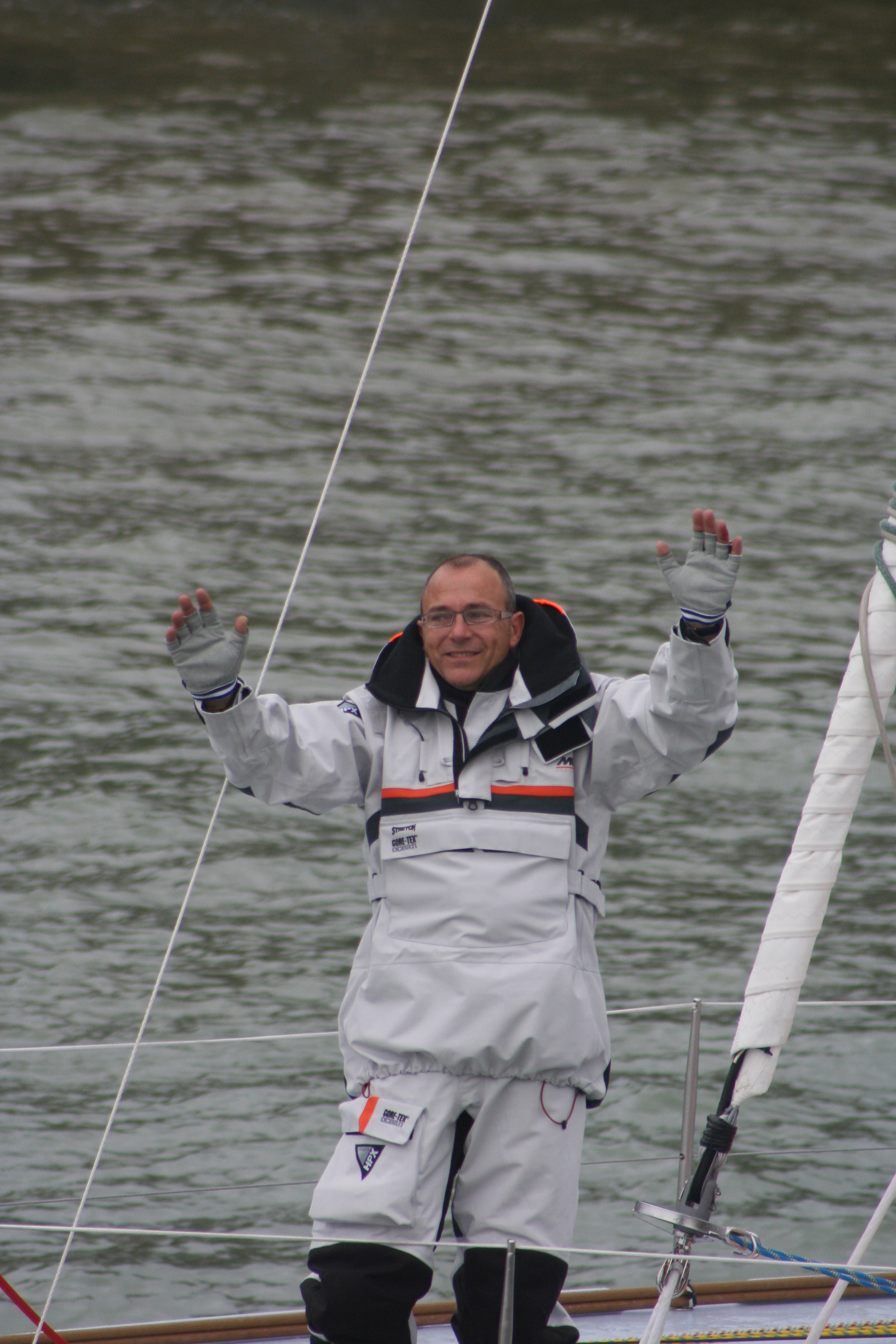
Departure of Vendée Globe 2008/2009

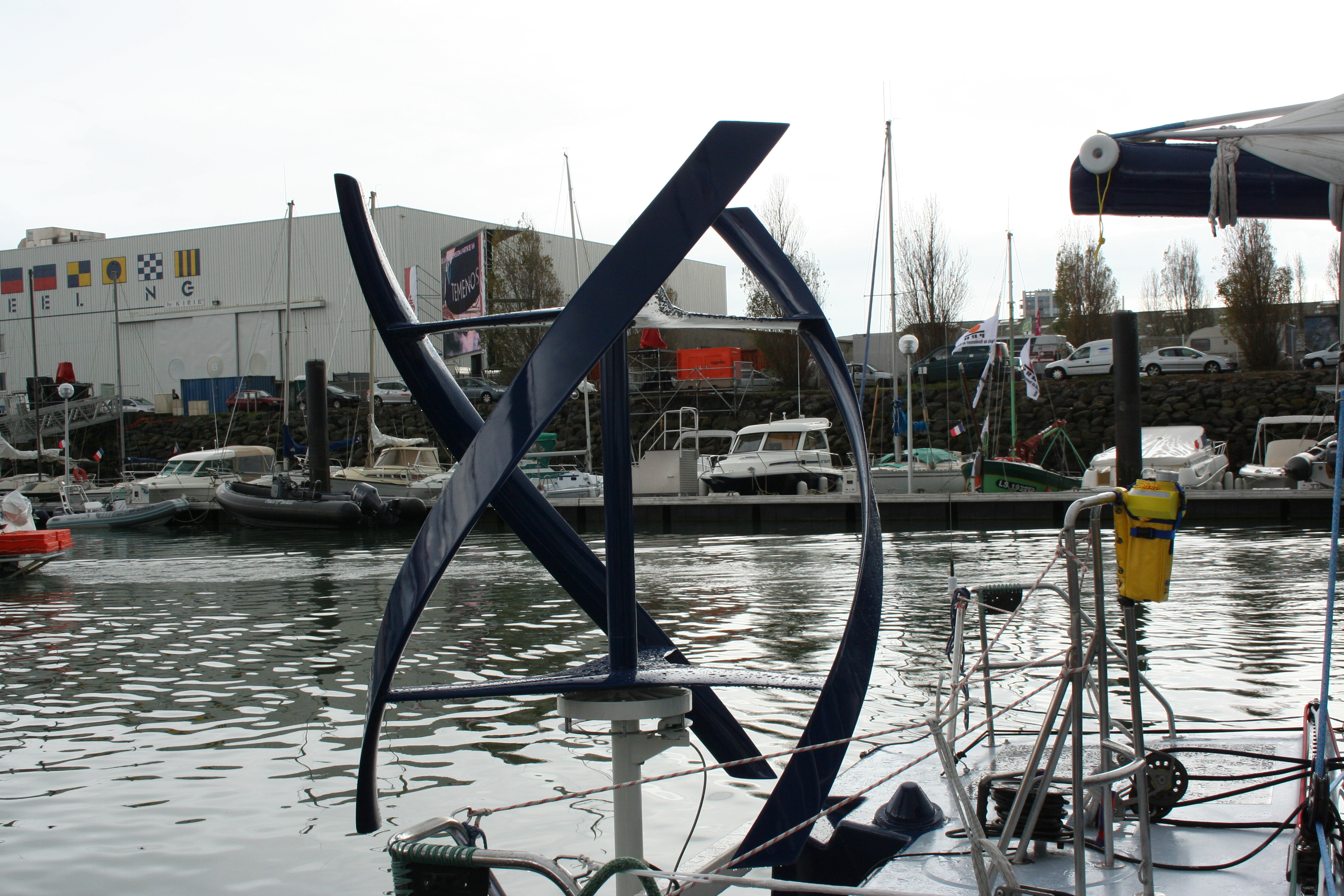
"Fondation Océan Vital"

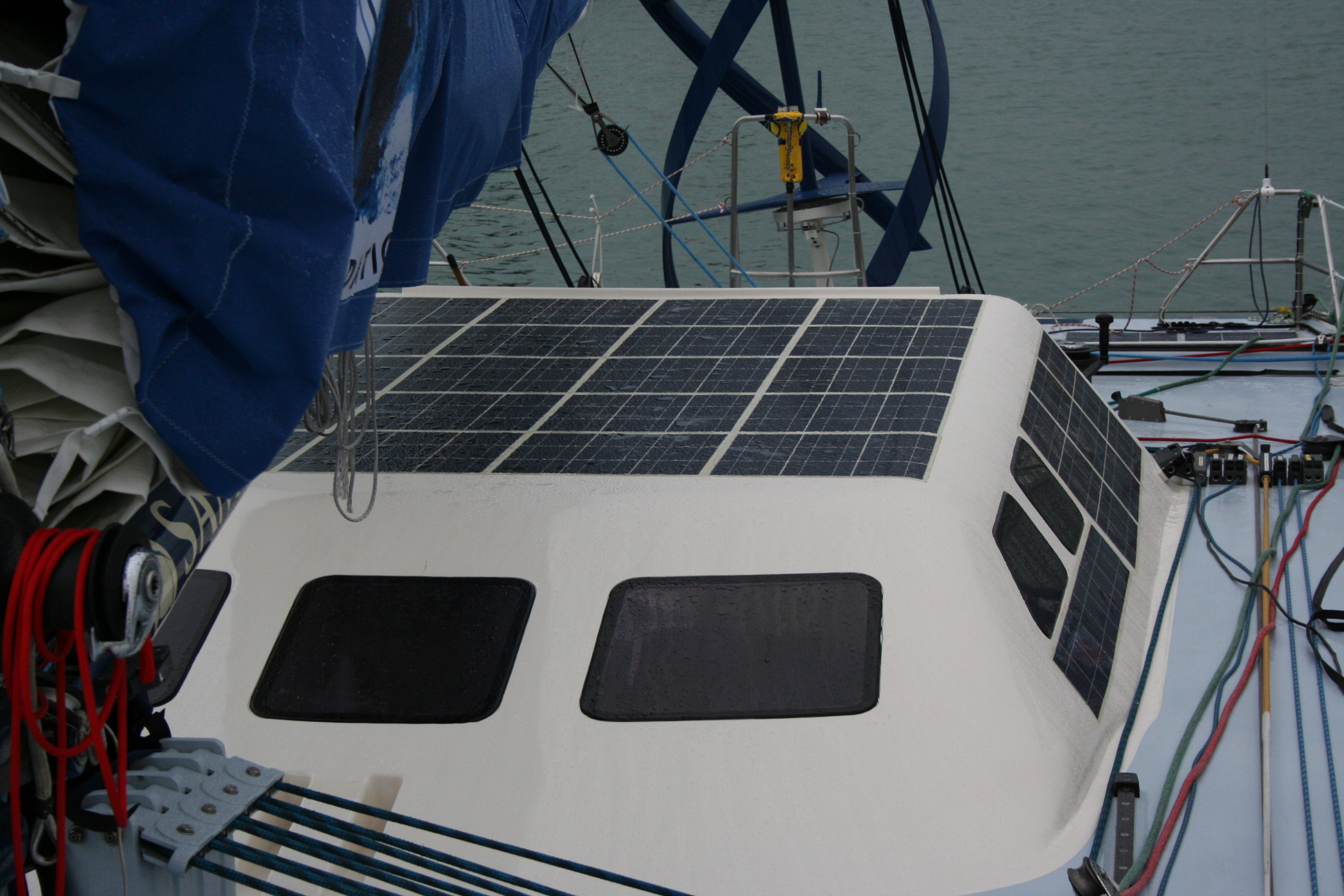
"Fondation Océan Vital"

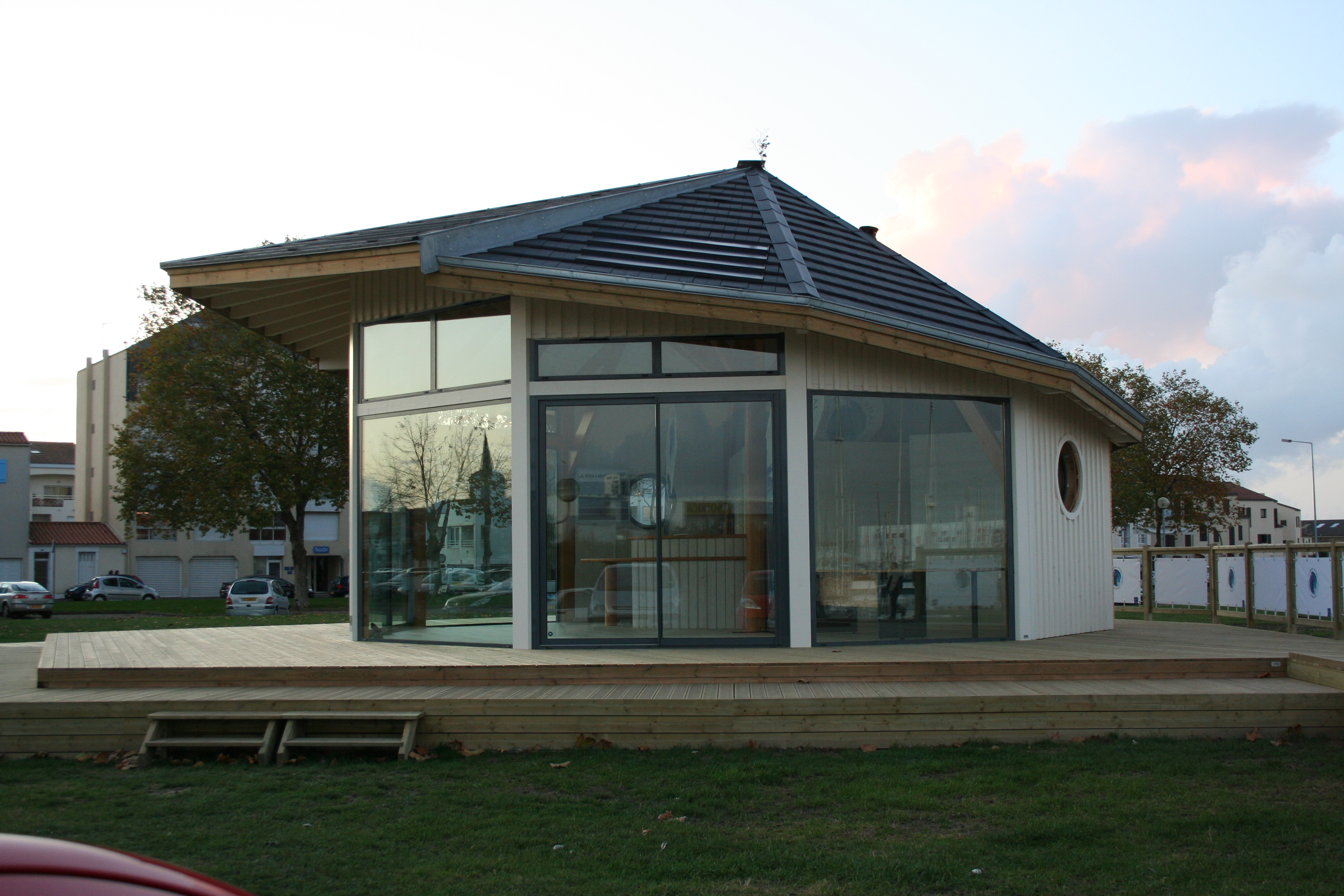
Le Carré d'Eraole réunit toutes les technologies développées par la Fondation Océan Vital.
