= Karen Leibovici (sailor) =

French offshore sailor and navigator

Personal information
- Nationality: French
- Born: 5 March 1971 (age 55) La Rochelle

Sailing career
- Sport: Sailing

Karen Leibovici is a French sailor born on 5 March 1971 in La Rochelle.

== Biography ==
Karen's career remains marked by March 13, 2005: that day, at 9:04 p.m., she became the fourth female skipper to complete the Vendée Globe.

She was subsequently awarded the Medal of Honour called the Ordre du Mérite Maritime for her commitment to the protection of the environment.

== Career highlights ==
1998:

- 1st Mini Summer

1999:

- Mini-Transat: abandonment

2000:

- 1st of the Mini Barcelona
- 2nd Triangle of the Sun
- 1st Transmanche

2001

- 9th Transat 6.50 (La Rochelle-Salvador de Bahia)
- 1st Mini Fastnet

2002

- Record crossing of the English Channel aboard Adrien with compatriot Jean-Luc Van Den Heede

2004

- 9th of the English Transat

2005

- 13th in the Vendée Globe out of 20 starters, on Benefic, the oldest of the boats involved, the famous "Red Cigare" (the former VDH boat)

2006

- 25th of the MAP trophy with the mini 6.50 tam tam No.546 in 2 j 03:27:51
