= Roland Jourdain =

French skipper and navigator

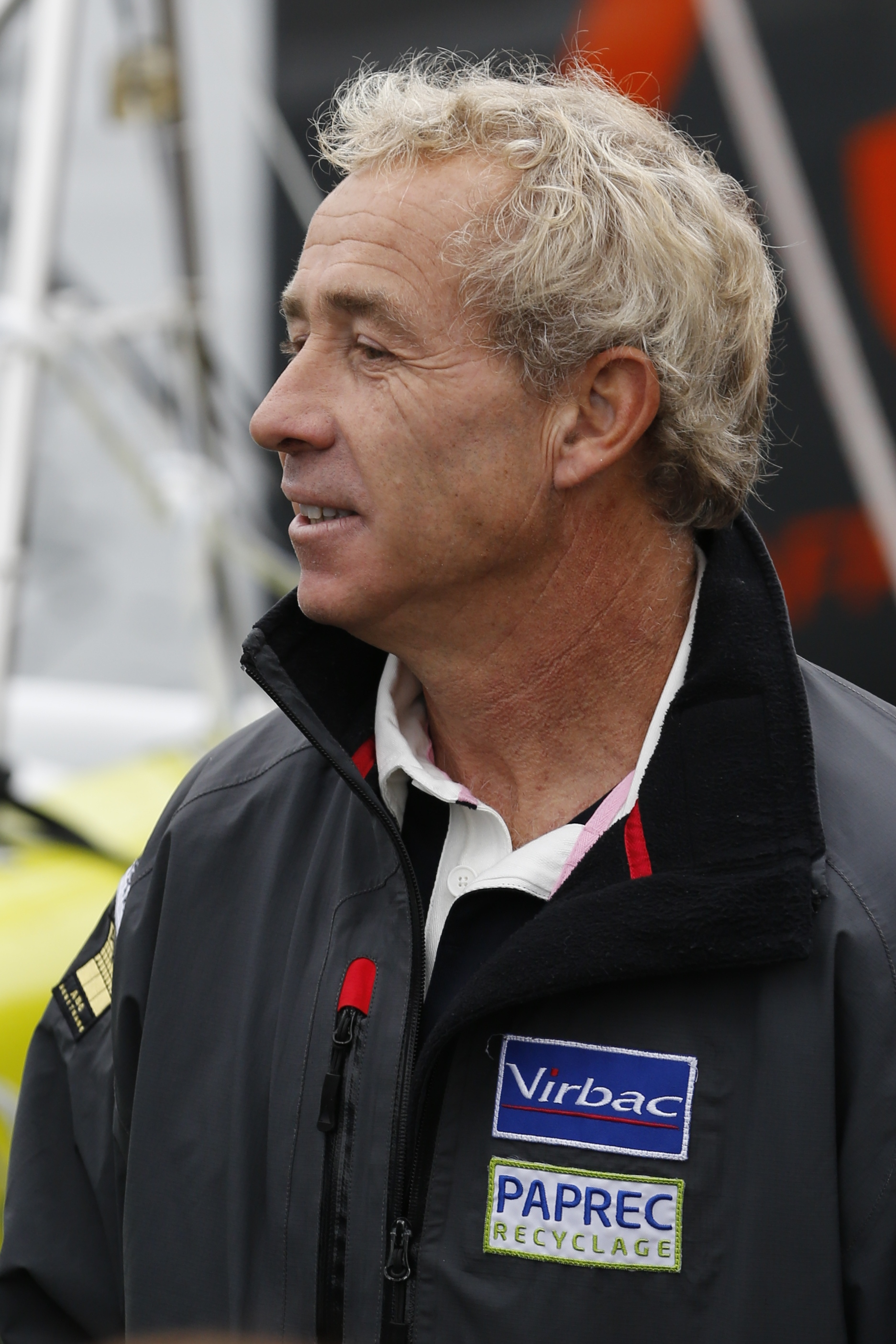
- 2003 TJV Start

Personal information
- Nickname: Bilou
- Nationality: French
- Born: 28 April 1964 (age 61); Quimper

Sailing career
- Class(es): IMOCA 60, Multis

Roland Jourdain, often nicknamed "Bilou" is a French professional yachtsman, born on 28 April 1964 in Quimper. He has twice won the Route du Rhum transatlantic race.

== Race Result Highlights ==
=== Round the World Races ===
DNF 2008–2009 Vendée Globe keel failure on day 85 of the race
DNF 2004–2005 Vendée Globe keel problems
3rd 2000–2001 Vendée Globe (onboard Sill)
11th 1989–1990 Whitbread Round the World Race on the yacht Fazisi
10th 1985–1986 Whitbread Round the World Race with Éric Tabarly on the yacht Côte d’Or56

=== Other IMOCA 60 Events ===
6th – 2010 Transat Jacques Vabre with Jean-Luc Nélias (FRA) (with Veolia Environnement)
2nd – 2004 Transat Jacques Vabre with Ellen MacArthur (GBR) (onboard IMOCA Sill et Veolia)
2nd – 2003 Transat Jacques Vabre with Alex Thomson (GBR) (onboard IMOCA Sill)
1st – 2001 Transat Jacques Vabre with Gaël Le Cléac’h (FRA) (onboard IMOCA Sill)
4th – 1999 Transat Jacques Vabre with Jean Le Cam (FRA) (onboard IMOCA Sill)

1st – 2010 Route du Rhum
1st – 2006 Route du Rhum
4th – 2002 Route du Rhum (onboard IMOCA 60 Sill)

=== Other Event ===
1st – 1995 Transat Jacques Vabre with Paul Vatine (FRA)
4th – 1994 Transat Jacques Vabre with Francis Joyon (FRA) (on trimaran ORMA Banque Populaire)

6th – 1997 Solitaire du Figaro
6th – 1996 Solitaire du Figaro
3rd – 1993 Solitaire du Figaro
3rd – 1994 Solitaire du Figaro
