= IMOCA 60 Fleury-Michon 10 =

Sailboat

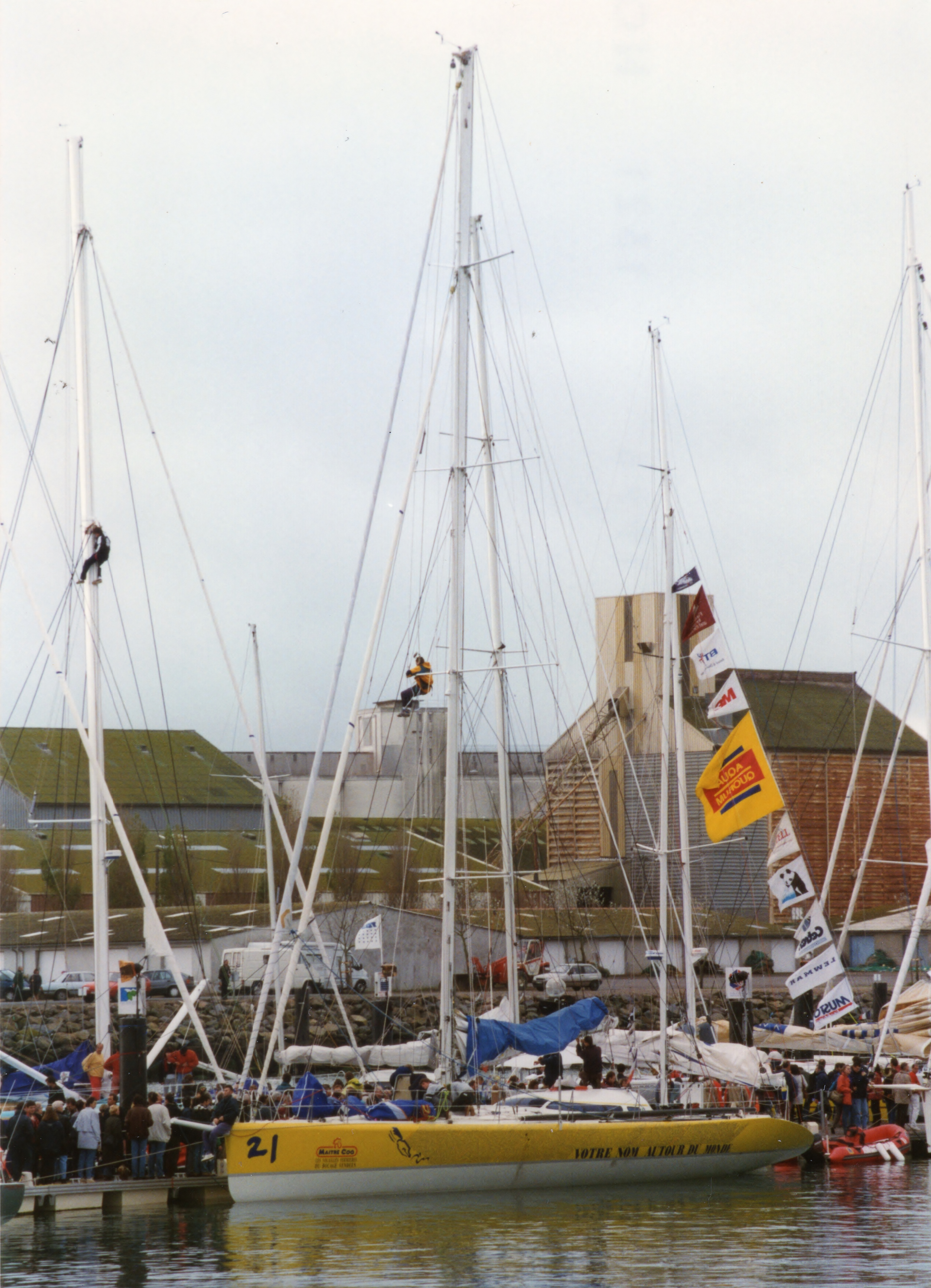

Development
- Designer: Philippe Briand
- Year: February 1992
- Builder: Jeanneau

The IMOCA 60 class yacht Fleury-Michon X was designed by Philippe Briand and launched in February 1989 after being built by Jeanneau based in Les Herbiers, France.

== Racing results ==
Pos	Year	Race	Class	Boat name	Skipper	Notes	Ref
Round the world races
DNF	1993	1989–1990 Vendée Globe	IMOCA 60	Fleury-Michon X	Philippe Poupon (FRA)	Capsized	
3 / 14	1993	1992–1993 Vendée Globe	IMOCA 60	Fleury-Michon X	Philippe Poupon (FRA)	117d 03h	
DNF / 15	1997	1996–1997 Vendée Globe	IMOCA 60	Votre Nom autour du Monde: Pommes Rhône Alpes	Bertrand De Broc (FRA)		
12 / 24	2001	2000–2001 Vendée Globe	IMOCA 60	aquarelle.com, 60	Simone Bianchetti (FRA)	121d 01h 28m	
11 / 20	2005	2004–2005 Vendée Globe	IMOCA 60	Roxy (1)	Anne Liardet (FRA)	119d 05h 28m	
Transatlantic Races
Other Races
