= Jean-Luc Van Den Heede =

French sailor

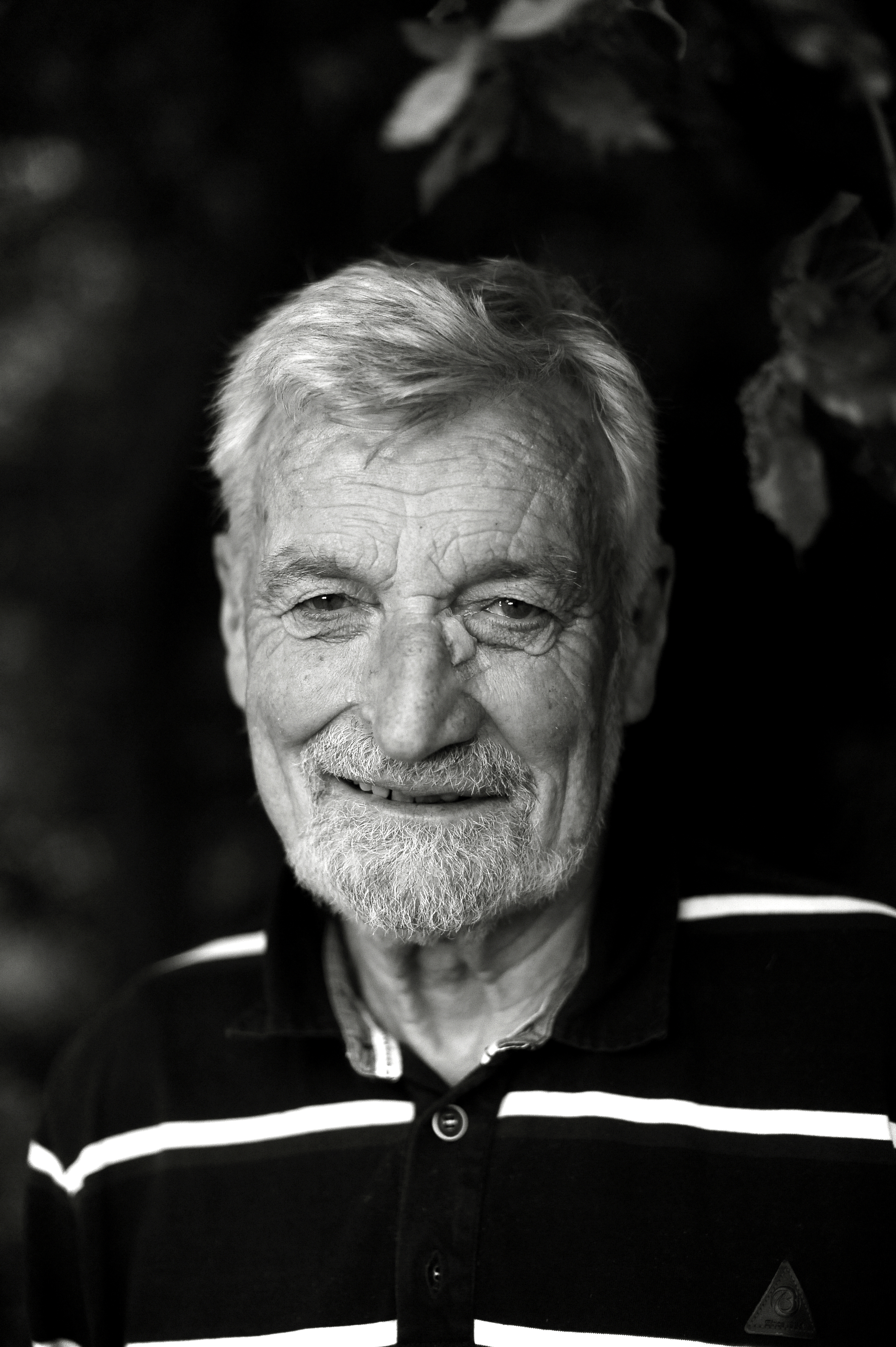
Jean-Luc Van Den Heede in 2025

Jean-Luc Van Den Heede (born 8 June 1945 in Amiens) is a French sailor. He is best known for his achievements in single-handed sailing and set the current world-record for the westabout circumnavigation (he holds the overall record, i.e. although he sailed solo, nobody was faster on this route with a crewed boat). He also holds the record of sailing Cape Horn 12 times in competitions.

He started sailing at the age of 17. In the Breton port city of Lorient he worked as a mathematics teacher. After 1989 he became a full-time sailor. Among sailors, he is also known by his initials VDH.

== Achievements ==
- 1977 : 2nd of the Mini Transat
- 1979 : 2nd of the Mini Transat
- 1986 : 2nd of the BOC Challenge on Let's Go
- 1990 : 3rd of the Vendée Globe on 3615 MET
- 1993 : 2nd of the Vendée Globe on Sofap Helvim
- 1993 : 4th of the Transat Jacques Vabre
- 1995 : 3rd of the BOC Challenge on Vendée Entreprises
- 1998 : 2nd of the Route du Rhum on Algimouss
- 2002 : Record crossing of the Channel aboard Adrien with Karen Leibovici
- 2004 : Record westabout circumnavigation in 122d 14h 3min 49s.
- 2019 : Winner of the 2018 Golden Globe Race
