= 2016–2017 Vendée Globe =

8th edition of the Vendée Globe

Event title
- Name: 2016–2017 Vendée Globe
- Edition: 8th edition
- Sponsor: Vendee Region of France

Event details
- Start location: Les Sables-d'Olonne
- Finish location: Les Sables-d'Olonne
- Course: Single person non-stop round the world race
- Start date: 6 November 2016
- Finish date: 6 November 2016
- Yachts: IMOCA 60
- Key people: Race Director; Denis Horeau

Competitors
- Competitors: 29 Boats
- Competing nations: 10 Nations

Results
- (gold) Gold: Armel Le Cléac'h (FRA); Banque populaire VIII
- (silver) Silver: Alex Thomson (GBR); Hugo Boss 6
- (bronze) Bronze: Jérémie Beyou (FRA); Maître Coq

The 2016–2017 Vendée Globe was a non-stop solo round-the-world yacht race for IMOCA 60 class yachts and the eighth edition of the race.

== Summary ==
The 2016 – 17 race started from Les Sables d'Olonne on 6 November 2016; was the eighth edition of the, with 29 skippers from ten countries. It lasted 124.5 days while going around the three great capes – the Cape of Good Hope (South Africa), Cape Leeuwin (Australia) and Cape Horn (Chile) and saw a record 18 skippers make it to the finish line.

This edition of the race was the first to feature foiling monohull boats equipped with hydrofoils and was therefore closely watched to evaluate the durability of foils in such circumstances. Of note, the four foiling boats sailed by professional skippers that made it to the finish line took the top places, indicating that such appendages are likely to be adopted by other sailors (see table below). The winner of this edition was Armel Le Cléac'h, finishing on 19 January 2017 in a record breaking time of 74 days, three hours and 35 minutes. Other records were set during the course, including the greatest distance covered by a monohull over the course of 24h, the fastest southbound crossing of the Equator and Cape of Good Hope by Alex Thomson. Winner Armel Le Cléac'h also broke the record for the fastest crossing of Cape Leeuwin, Cape Horn and the Equator (northbound).

The race featured the youngest and oldest skippers ever to complete the race – on consecutive days (Alan Roura, 23 years old; Rich Wilson, aged 66). Also, Didac Costa was forced to return to harbour after less than one hour of sailing as a result of water damage to the boat's electric system. He returned to the race four days later and finished in 14th place. In addition, Conrad Colman finished under jury rig after dismasting 715 nm from the finish, while running short on food and electric power. The latter was compounded by the fact that his boat – Foresight Natural Energy – was propelled solely by renewable energy sources and the critical speed required for using hydrogenerators as well as sunlight to feed his solar panels were short of par. Colman was the first skipper to complete the Vendée Globe without using fossil fuels, two weeks after breaking his mast.

Race Director for this edition was Denis Horeau who heads the event management team having done the role for the 1989, 2004, 2008 and 2012 editions.

== Results ==
=== Finishing time ===
Classified results for the 2016–2017 edition
Pos.	Skipper	Boat name	Finish time	Elapsed time	Deltas	Ref.
1	Armel Le Cléac'h (FRA)	Banque populaire VIII	19 January 2017 at 16 h 37	74 d 03 h 35 m 46 s	Record	
2	Alex Thomson (GBR)	Hugo Boss 6	20 January 2017 at 08 h 37	74 d 19 h 35 m 15 s	+ 0 d 15 h 59 m 29 s	
3	Jérémie Beyou (FRA)	Maître Coq	23 January 2017 at 19:40	78 d 06 h 38 m 40 s	+ 4 d 03 h 02 m 54 s	
4	Jean-Pierre Dick (FRA)	StMichel-Virbac	25 January 2017 at 14:47	80 d 01 h 45 m 45 s	+ 5 d 22 h 09 m 59 s	
5	Yann Eliès (FRA)	Quéguiner – Leucémie Espoir	25 January 2017 at 16:13	80 d 03 h 11 m 09 s	+ 5 d 23 h 35 m 23 s	
6	Jean Le Cam (FRA)	Finistère Mer Vent	25 January 2017 at 17:43	80 d 04 h 41 m 54 s	+ 6 d 01 h 06 m 08 s	
7	Louis Burton (FRA)	Bureau Vallée	2 February 2017 at 08:47	87 d 21 h 45 m 49 s •	+ 13 d 18 h 10 m 03 s	
8	Nándor Fa (HUN)	Spirit of Hungary	8 February 2017 at 11:54	93 d 22 h 52 m 09 s	+ 19 d 19 h 16 m 23 s	
9	Éric Bellion (FRA)	Comme un seul homme	13 February 2017 at 17:58	99 d 04 h 56 m 20 s	+ 25 d 01 h 20 m 34 s	
10	Arnaud Boissières (FRA)	La Mie câline	17 February 2017 at 09:26	102 d 20 h 24 m 09 s	+ 28 d 16 h 48 m 23 s	
11	Fabrice Amedeo (FRA)	Newrest-Matmut	18 February 2017 at 10:03	103 d 21 h 01 m 00 s	+ 29 d 17 h 25 m 14 s	
12	Alan Roura (SUI)	La Fabrique	20 February 2017 at 09:12	105 d 20 h 10 m 32 s	+ 31 d 16 h 34 m 46 s	
13	Rich Wilson (USA)	Great American IV	21 February 2017 at 13:50	107 d 00 h 48 m 18 s	+ 32 d 21 h 12 m 32 s	
14	Didac Costa (ESP)	One planet One ocean	23 February 2017 at 08:52	108 d 19 h 50 m 45 s	+ 34 d 16 h 14 m 59 s	
15	Romain Attanasio (FRA)	Famille Mary – Étamine du Lys	24 February 2017 at 11:06	109 d 22 h 04 m 00 s	+ 35 d 18 h 28 m 14 s	
16	Conrad Colman (NZL) (USA)	Foresight Natural Energy	24 February 2017 at 15:00	110 d 01 h 58 m 41 s	+ 35 d 22 h 22 m 55 s	
17	Pieter Heerema (NED)	No Way Back	2 March 2017 at 22:26	116 d 09 h 24 m 12 s	+ 42 d 05 h 48 m 26 s	
18	Sébastien Destremau (AUS) (FRA)	TechnoFirst-FaceOcean	11 March 2017 at 01:41	124 d 12 h 38 m 18 s	+ 50 d 09 h 02 m 32 s	
DNF	Enda O'Coineen (IRL)	Kilcullen Voyager – Team Ireland	Day 56: Dismasted 180 nm SE of New Zealand			
DNF	Paul Meilhat (FRA)	SMA	Day 49: Hydraulic-keel fissured			
DNF	Stéphane Le Diraison (FRA)	Compagnie du Lit-Boulogne Billancourt	Day 41: Dismasted 950 nautical miles away from Australia			
DNF	Thomas Ruyant (FRA)	Le Souffle du Nord pour Le Projet Imagine	Day 44: Damaged hull due to collision with an UFO			
DNF	Sébastien Josse (FRA)	Gitana – Edmond de Rothschild	Day 30: Hydrofoil Damage off Australia			
DNF	Kito de Pavant (FRA)	Bastide-Otio	Day 30: Damaged keel – North of Crozet Islands			
DNF	Kojiro Shiraishi (JPN)	Spirit of Yukoh IV	Day 27: Damaged masthead – South of Cape of Good Hope			
DNF	Tanguy de Lamotte (FRA)	Initiatives-Cœur (2)	Day 23: Damaged masthead – North of Cape Verde Islands			
DNF	Morgan Lagravière (FRA)	Safran III	Day 19: Damaged rudder – South Atlantic			
DNF	Vincent Riou (FRA)	PRB 4	Day 17: Damaged keel – South Atlantic			
DNF	Bertrand de Broc (FRA)	MACSF	Day 14: Damaged keel - South Atlantic near Fernando de Noronha			

• Penalised two hours for an involuntary rupture of the propeller shaft scrutineering seal.

=== Stage times ===
This data comes from the official website.

Skipper	Equator	Cape of Good Hope	Leeuwin	Cape Horn	Equator	Finish Line
Armel Le Cléac'h	09 d 09 h 56 min	18 d 03 h 30 min	28 d 20 h 12 min	47 d 00 h 32 min	61 d 12 h 21 min	74 d 03 h 36 min
Alex Thomson	09 d 07 h 02 min	17 d 22 h 58 min	29 d 01 h 21 min	48 d 23 h 40 min	62 d 05 h 10 min	74 d 19 h 36 min
Jérémie Beyou	09 d 16 h 49 min	20 d 12 h 41 min	32 d 05 h 45 min	51 d 01 h 42 min	65 d 01 h 27 min	78 d 06 h 38 min
Jean-Pierre Dick	10 d 16 h 51 min	22 d 21 h 13 min	33 d 15 h 53 min	53 d 18 h 32 min	66 d 22 h 31 min	80 d 01 h 46 min
Yann Eliès	10 d 01 h 17 min	21 d 03 h 18 min	33 d 04 h 52 min	54 d 04 h 54 min	67 d 12 h 14 min	80 d 03 h 11 min
Jean Le Cam	10 d 10 h 17 min	23 d 10 h 21 min	34 d 07 h 00 min	54 d 03 h 46 min	67 d 11 h 43 min	80 d 04 h 42 min
Louis Burton	11 d 18 h 39 min	27 d 05 h 06 min	38 d 14 h 03 min	58 d 18 h 48 min	73 d 02 h 42 min	87 d 21 h 46 min
Nándor Fa	12 d 10 h 28 min	28 d 00 h 17 min	40 d 06 h 10 min	63 d 18 h 36 min	79 d 05 h 25 min	93 d 22 h 53 min
Éric Bellion	12 d 19 h 55 min	29 d 04 h 30 min	44 d 11 h 28 min	66 d 02 h 47 min	83 d 11 h 41 min	99 d 04 h 57 min
Arnaud Boissières	12 d 01 h 36 min	28 d 04 h 19 min	42 d 12 h 07 min	70 d 17 h 52 min	87 d 11 h 36 min	102 d 20 h 25 min
Fabrice Amedeo	12 d 04 h 40 min	28 d 07 h 59 min	43 d 21 h 20 min	70 d 13 h 38 min	87 d 20 h 20 min	103 d 21 h 01 min
Alan Roura	13 d 14 h 51 min	29 d 22 h 41 min	44 d 01 h 11 min	71 d 04 h 37 min	89 d 00 h 23 min	105 d 20 h 11 min
Rich Wilson	12 d 16 h 45 min	29 d 16 h 18 min	44 d 07 h 38 min	71 d 14 h 55 min	91 d 06 h 14 min	107 d 00 h 49 min
Didac Costa	17 d 12 h 21 min	34 d 01 h 11 min	48 d 12 h 00 min	75 d 01 h 41 min	92 d 15 h 05 min	108 d 19 h 51 min
Romain Attanasio	12 d 19 h 35 min	34 d 21 h 56 min	50 d 13 h 31 min	75 d 08 h 41 min	92 d 16 h 07 min	109 d 22 h 04 min
Conrad Colman	12 d 03 h 36 min	28 d 08 h 54 min	41 d 16 h 47 min	66 d 16 h 14 min	84 d 20 h 43 min	110 d 01 h 59 min
Pieter Heerema	13 d 07 h 55 min	30 d 23 h 06 min	49 d 08 h 30 min	79 d 08 h 35 min	96 d 09 h 56 min	116 d 09 h 24 min
Sébastien Destremau	16 d 02 h 47 min	35 d 08 h 10 min	51 d 04 h 01 min	84 d 01 h 34 min	104 d 20 h 15 min	124 d 12 h 39 min
Enda O'Coineen	14 d 07 h 34 min	29 d 21 h 54 min	44 d 02 h 48 min	abandon		
Paul Meilhat	09 jd12 h 49 min	20 d 11 h 54 min	31 d 21 h 38 min	abandon		
Stéphane Le Diraison	12 d 04 h 07 min	28 d 01 h 48 min	39 d 20 h 09 min	abandon		
Thomas Ruyant	10 d 16 h 15 min	23 d 06 h 25 min	36 d 05 h 47 min	abandon		
Sébastien Josse	09 d 12 h 01 min	18 d 12 h 42 min	abandon			
Kito de Pavant	11 d 03 h 59 min	25 d 09 h 08 min	abandon			
Kojiro Shiraishi	12 d 09 h 57 min	abandon				
Vincent Riou	09 d 10 h 24 min	abandon				
Morgan Lagravière	09 j 17 h 30 min	abandon				
Bertrand de Broc	11 d 20 h 01 min	abandon				

== List of participants sailor and boats ==
=== Gallery of sailors ===
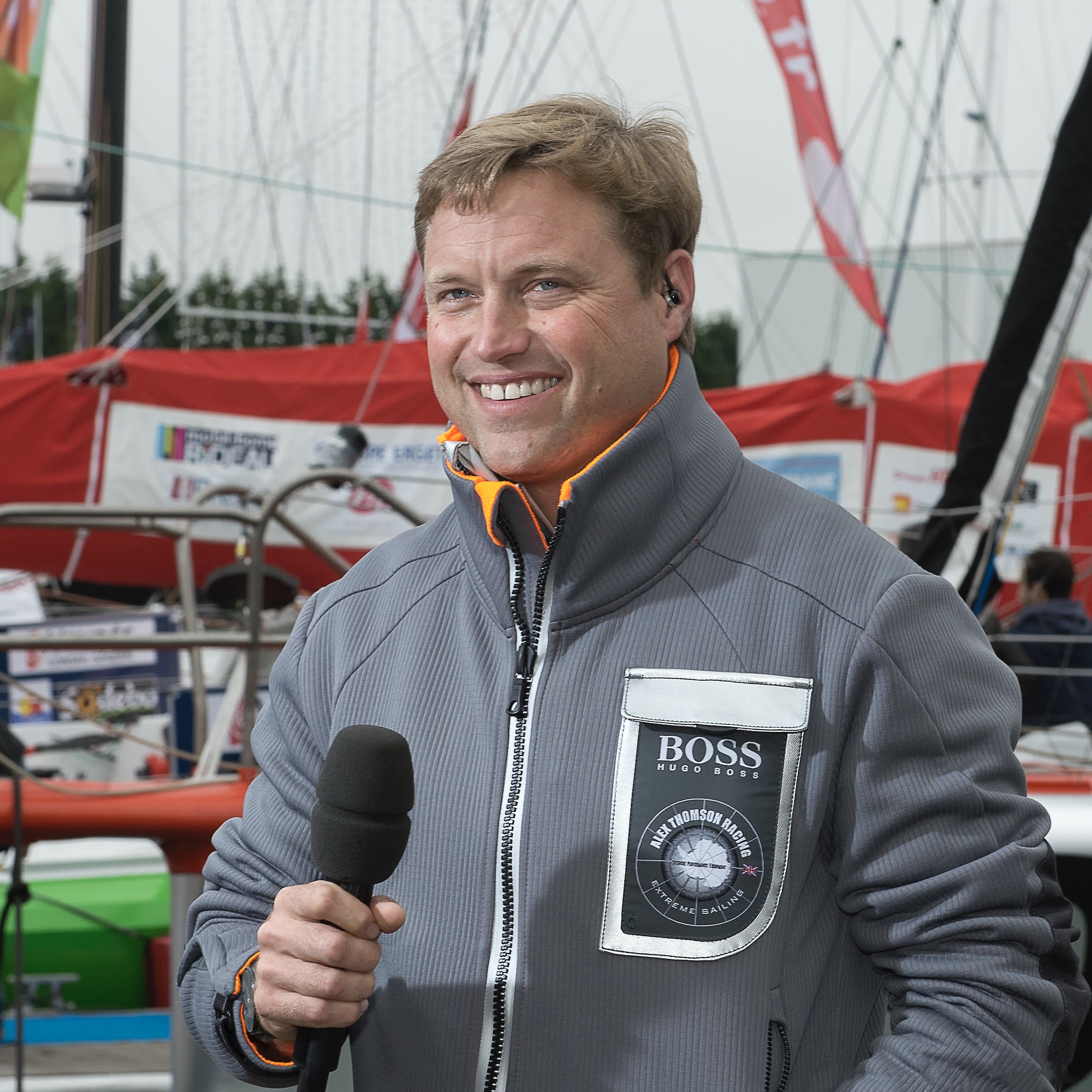
Alex Thomson (GBR)
Hugo Boss 6

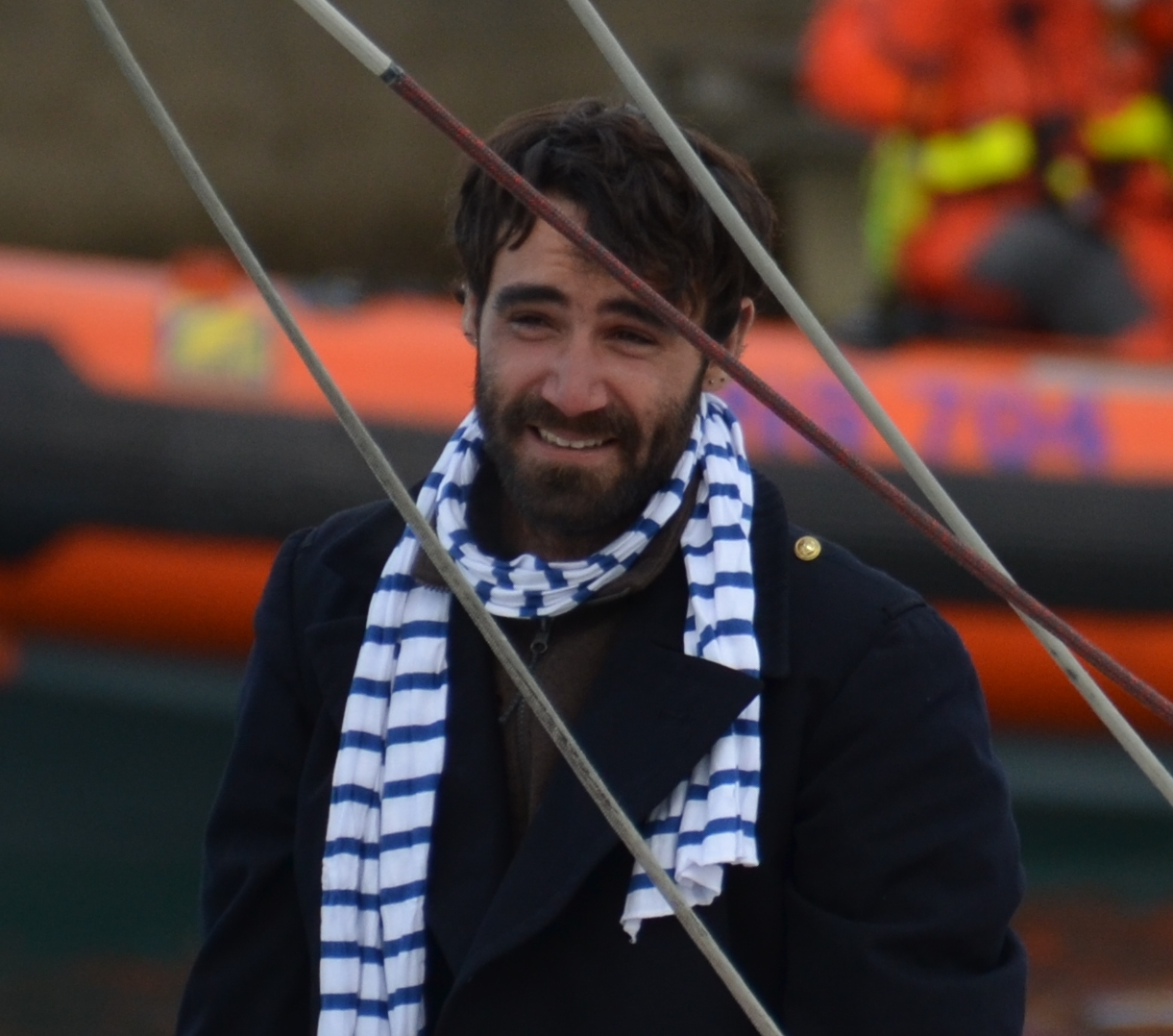
Alan Roura (SUI)
La Fabrique

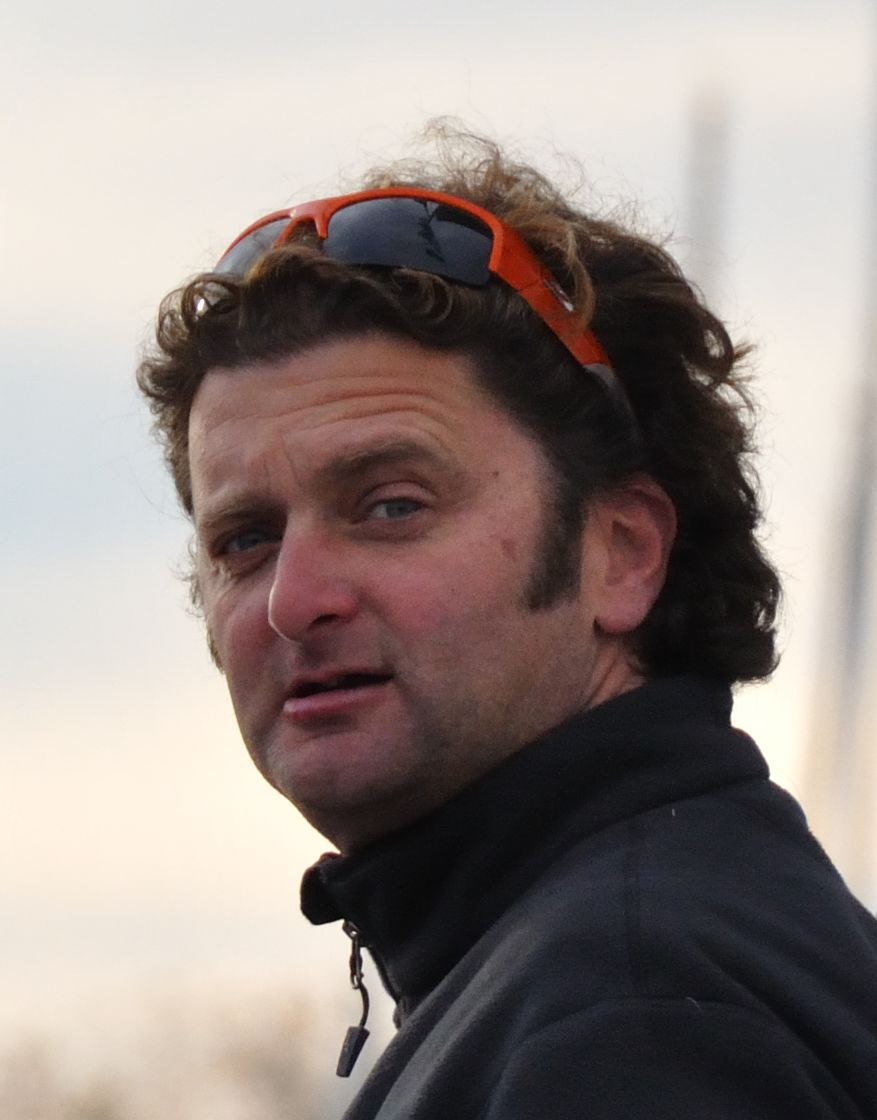
Arnaud Boissières (FRA)
La Mie câline

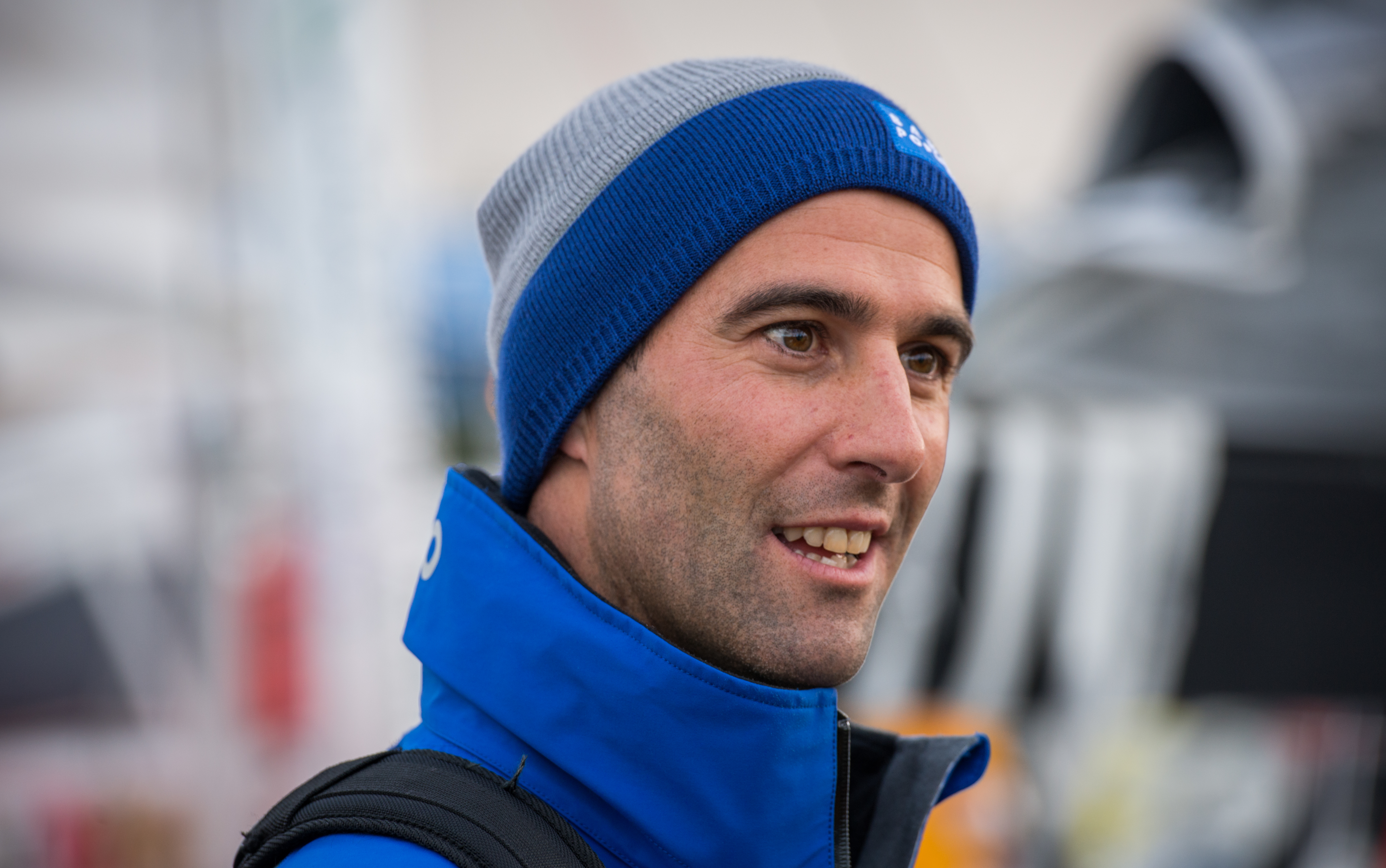
Armel Le Cléac'h (FRA)
Banque populaire VIII

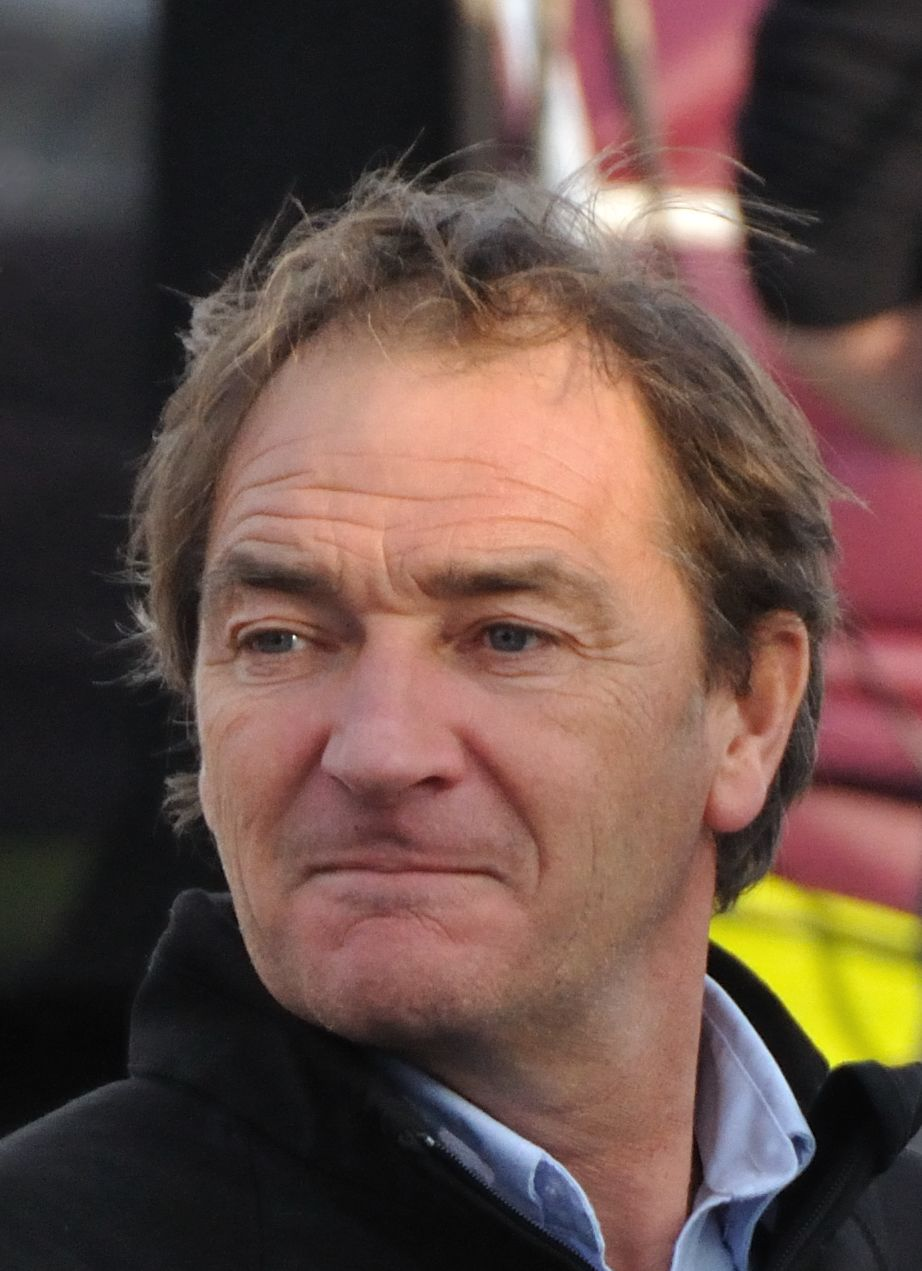
Bertrand de Broc (FRA)
MACSF

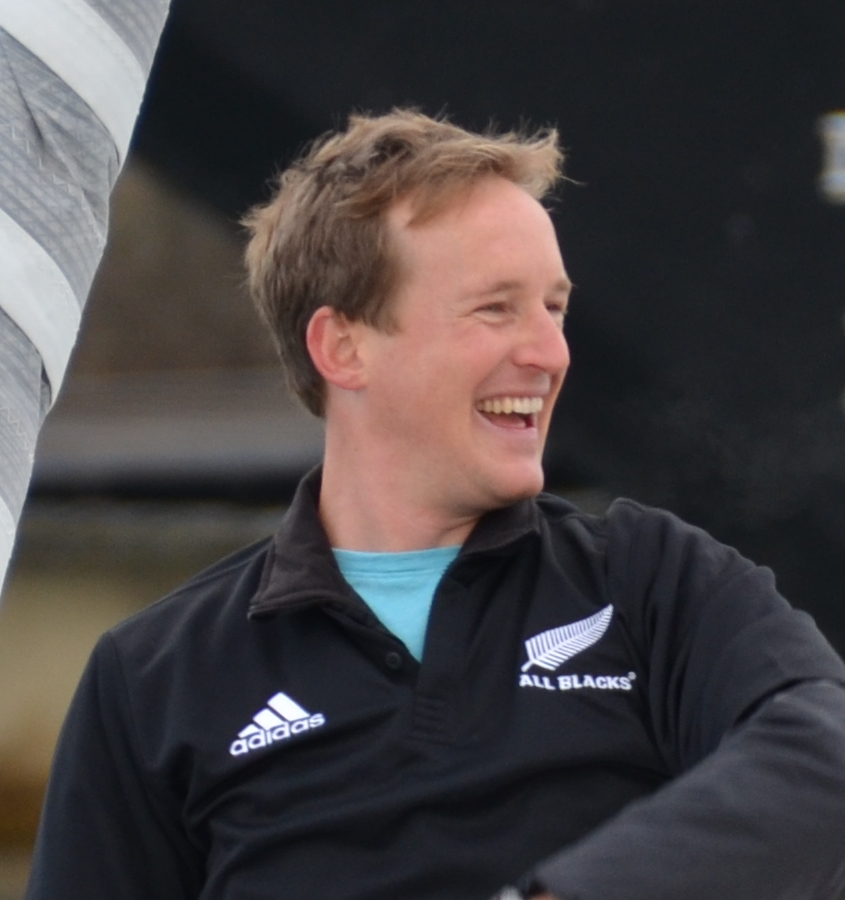
Conrad Colman (NZL) (USA)
Foresight Natural Energy

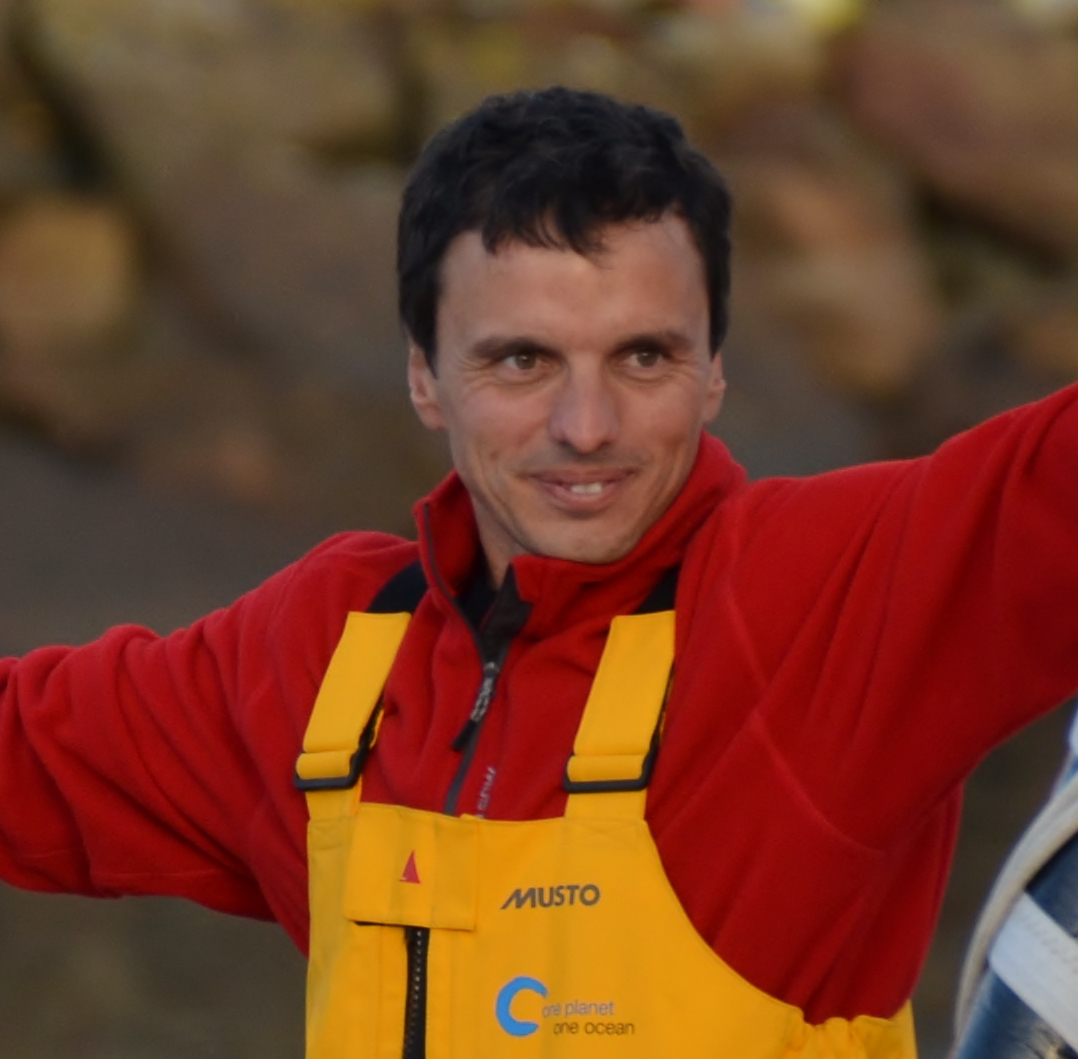
Didac Costa (ESP)
One planet One Ocean

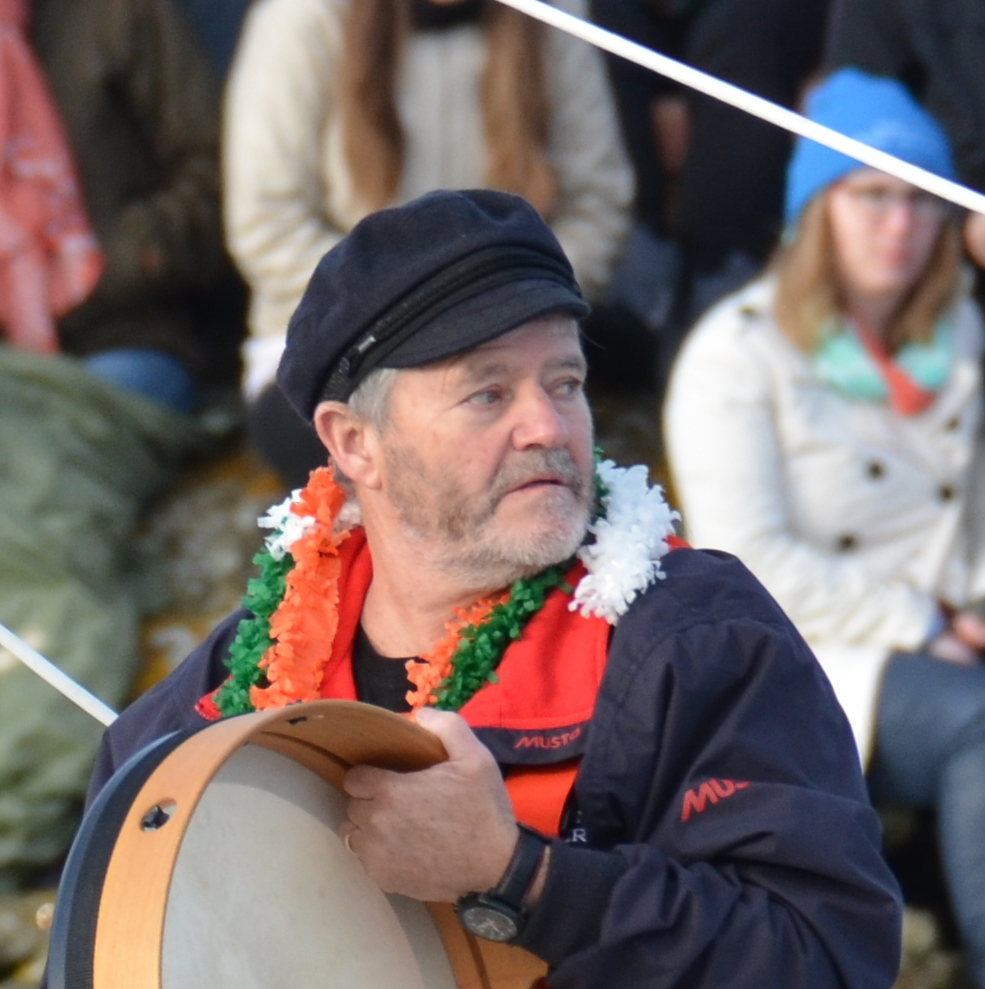
Enda O'Coineen (IRL)
Kilcullen Voyager - Team Ireland

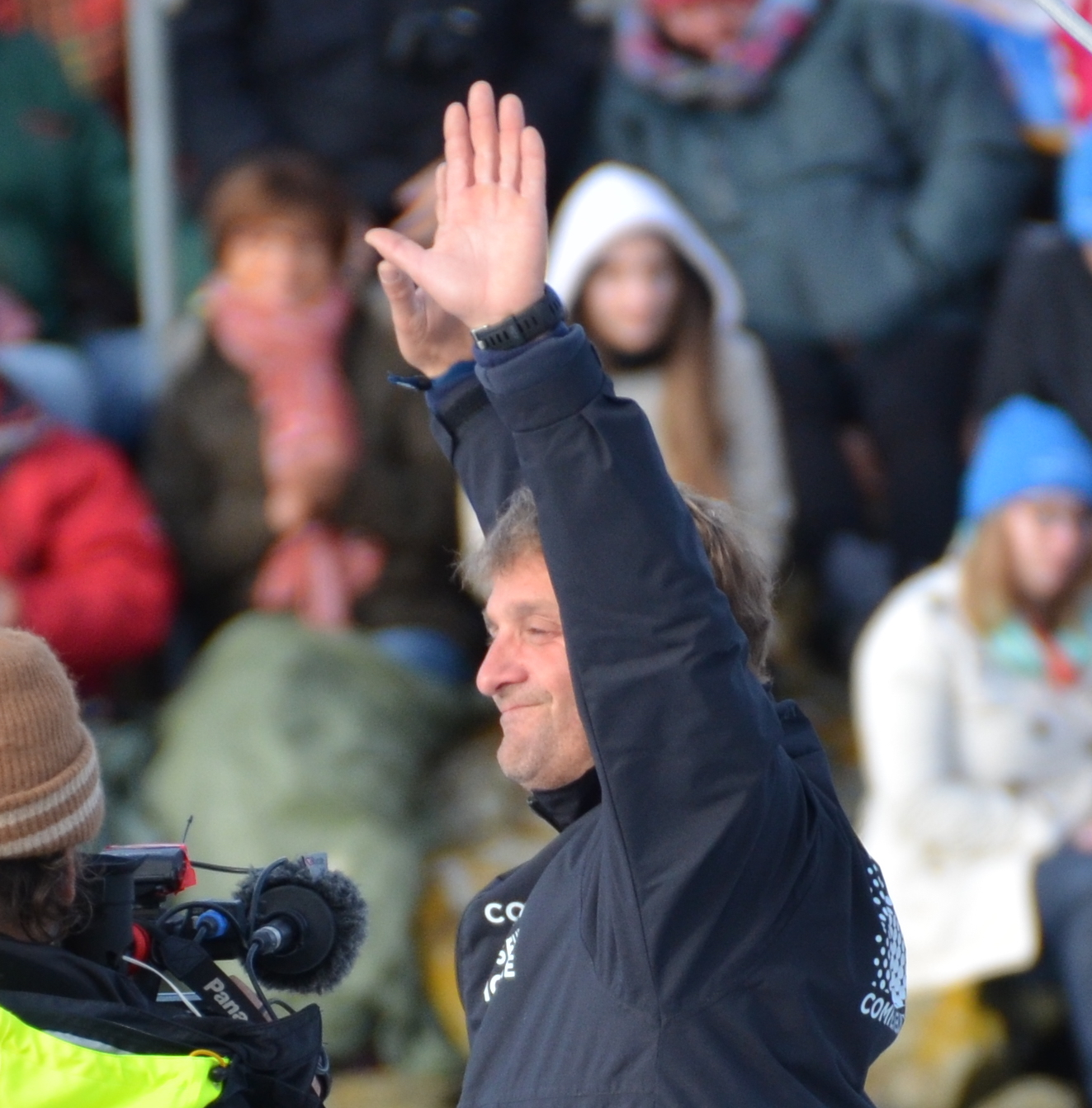
Éric Bellion (FRA)
Comme un seul homme

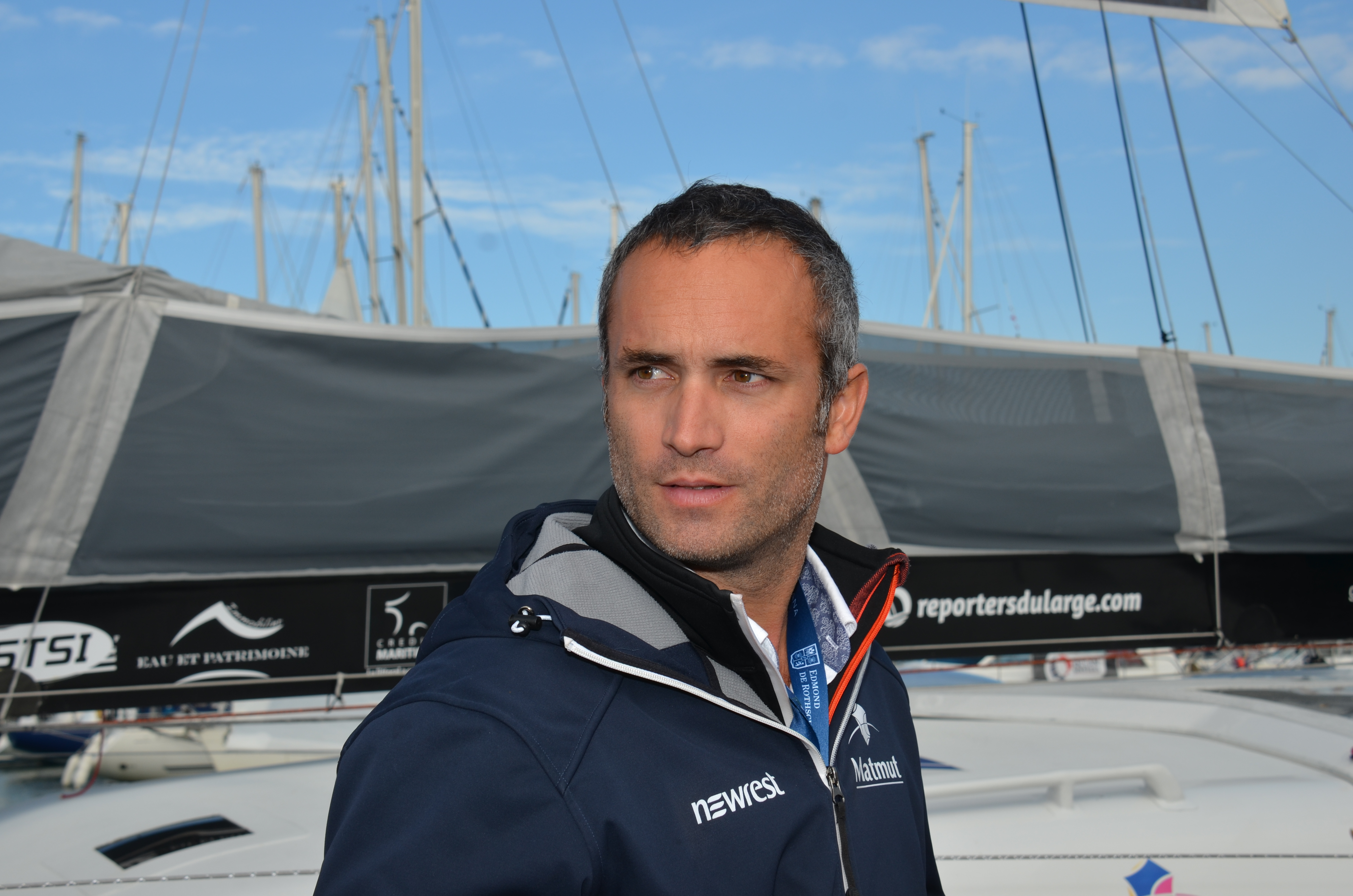
Fabrice Amedeo (FRA)
Newrest-Matmutt

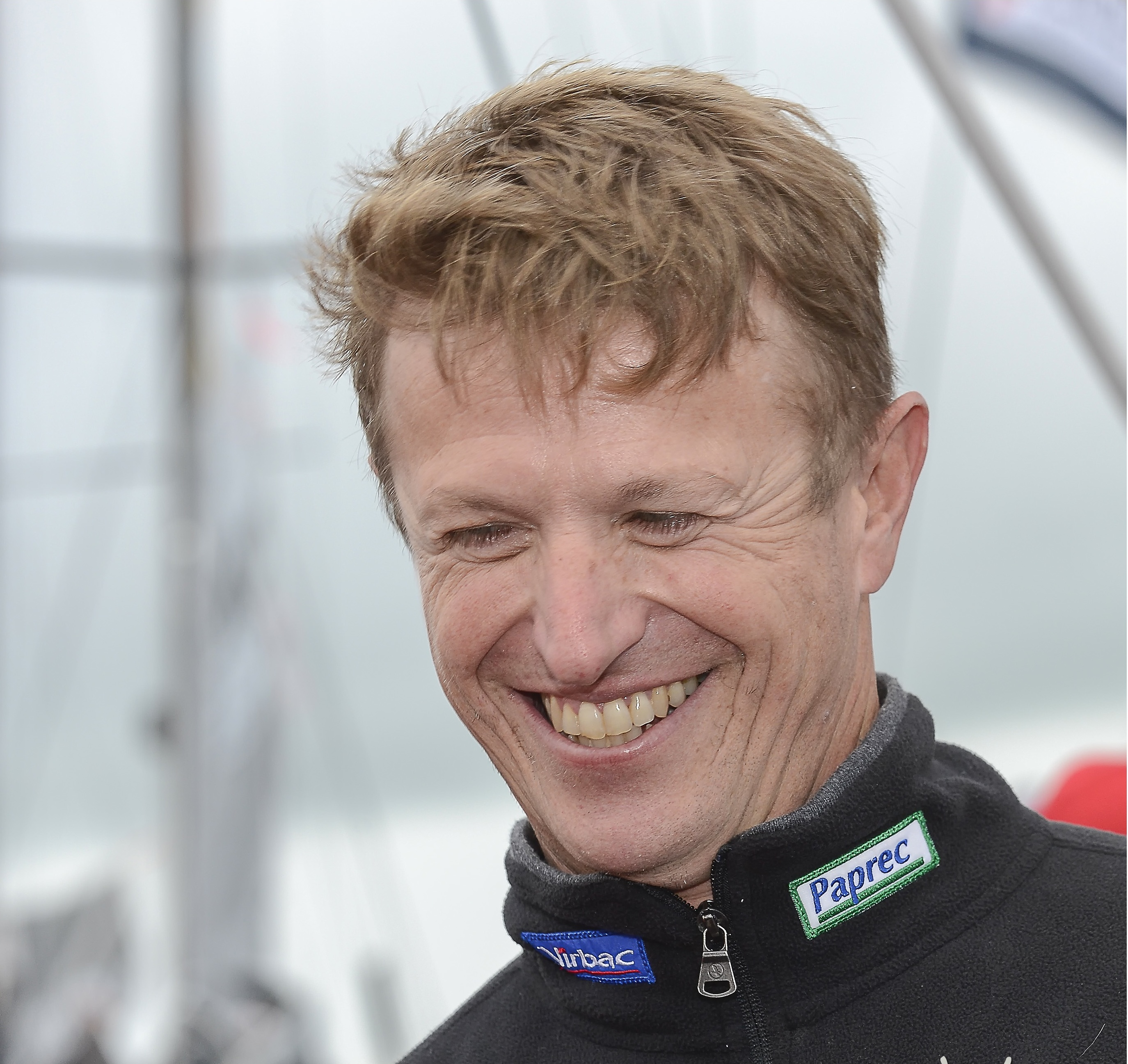
Jean-Pierre Dick (FRA)
StMichel-Virbac

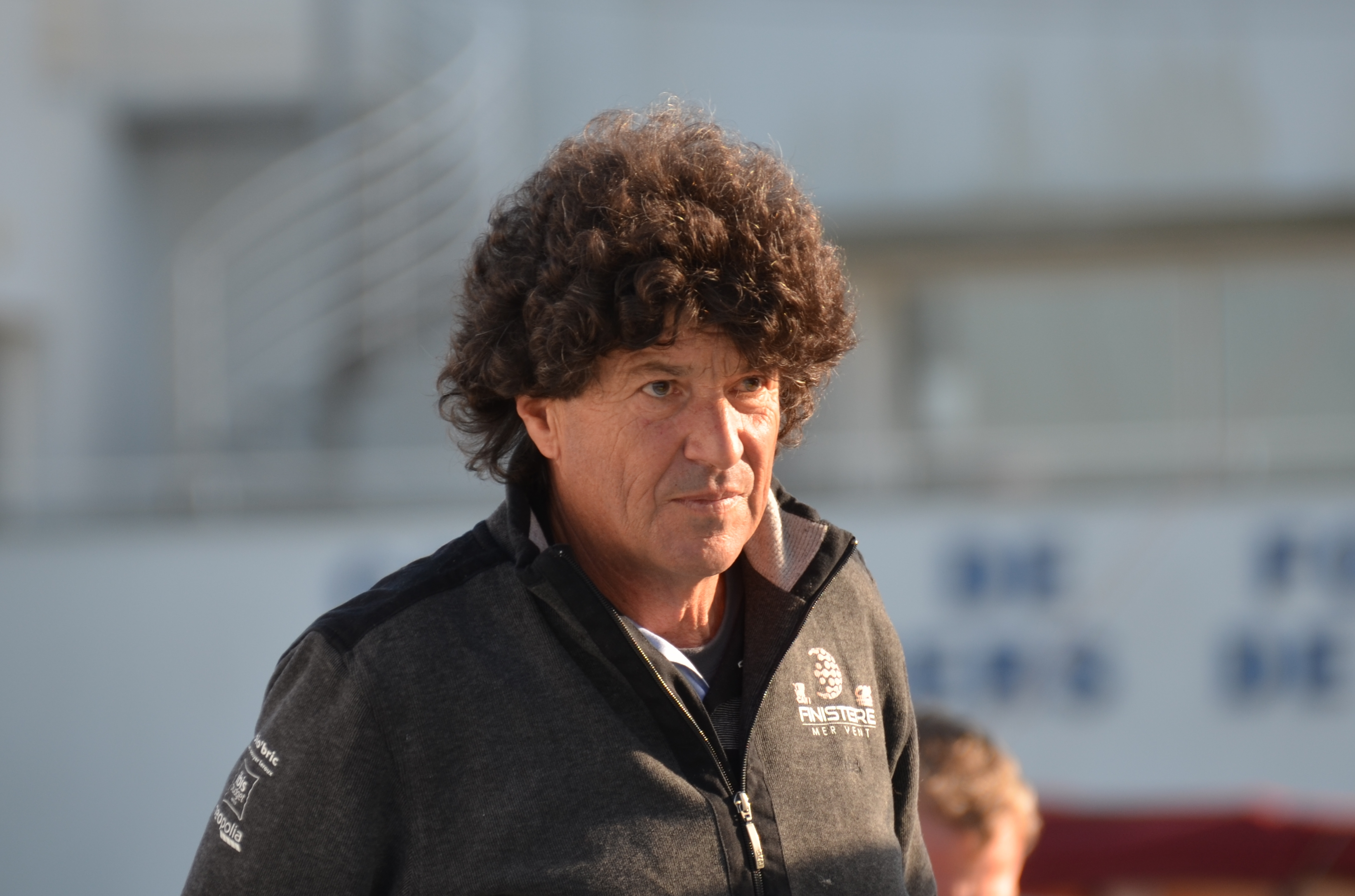
Jean Le Cam (FRA)
Finistère Mer Vent

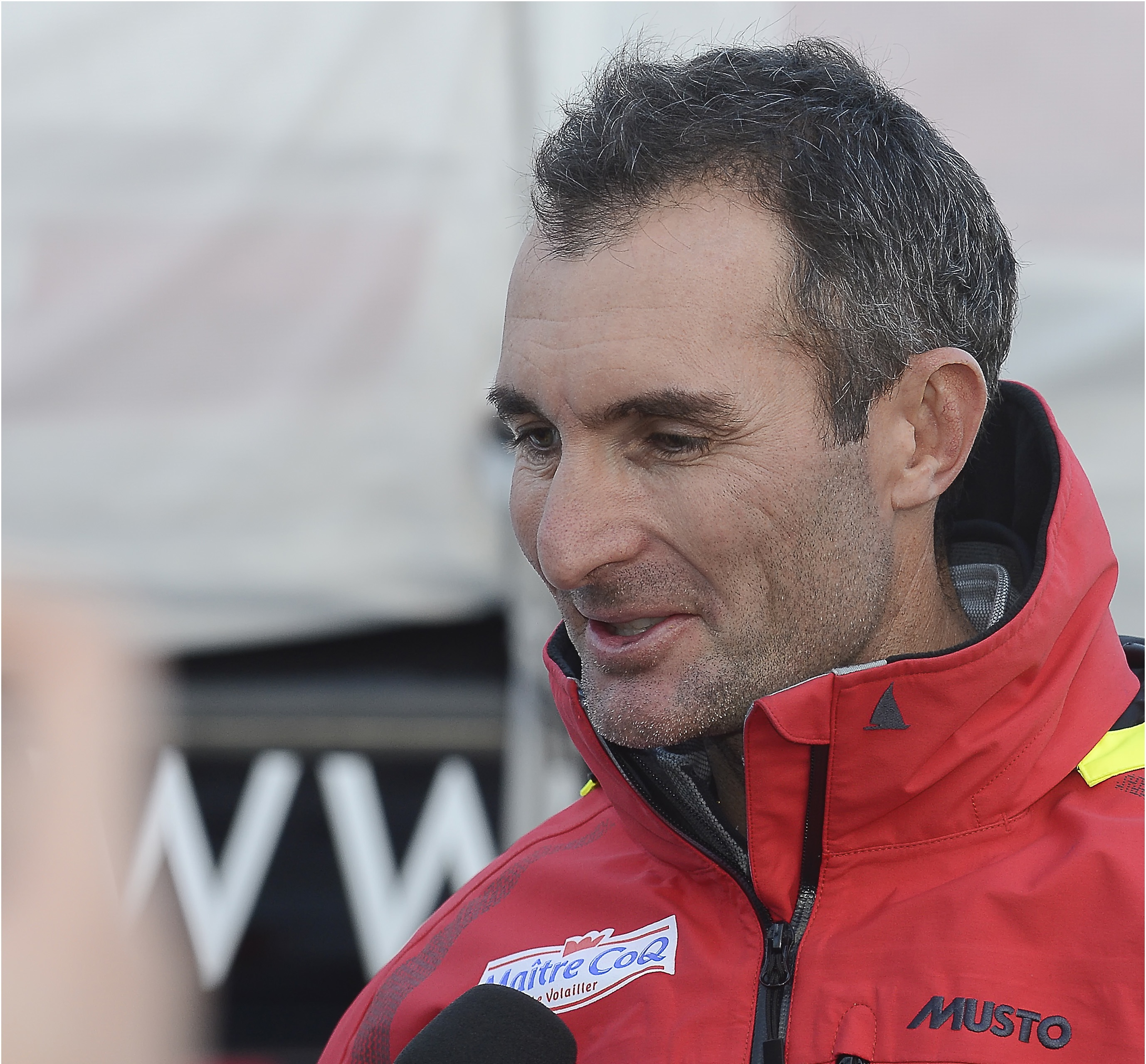
Jérémie Beyou (FRA)
Maître Coq

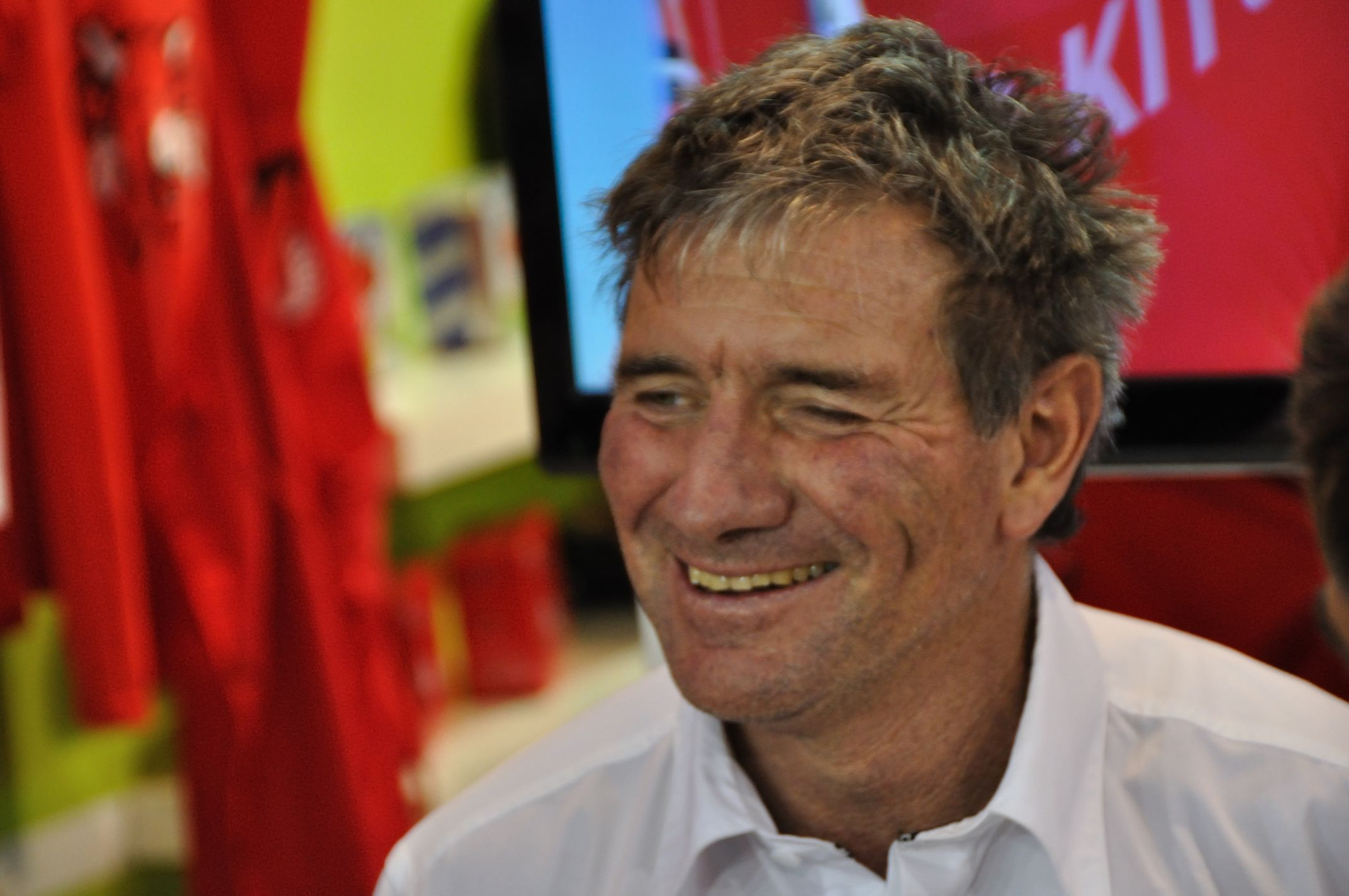
Kito de Pavant (FRA)
Bastide-Otio

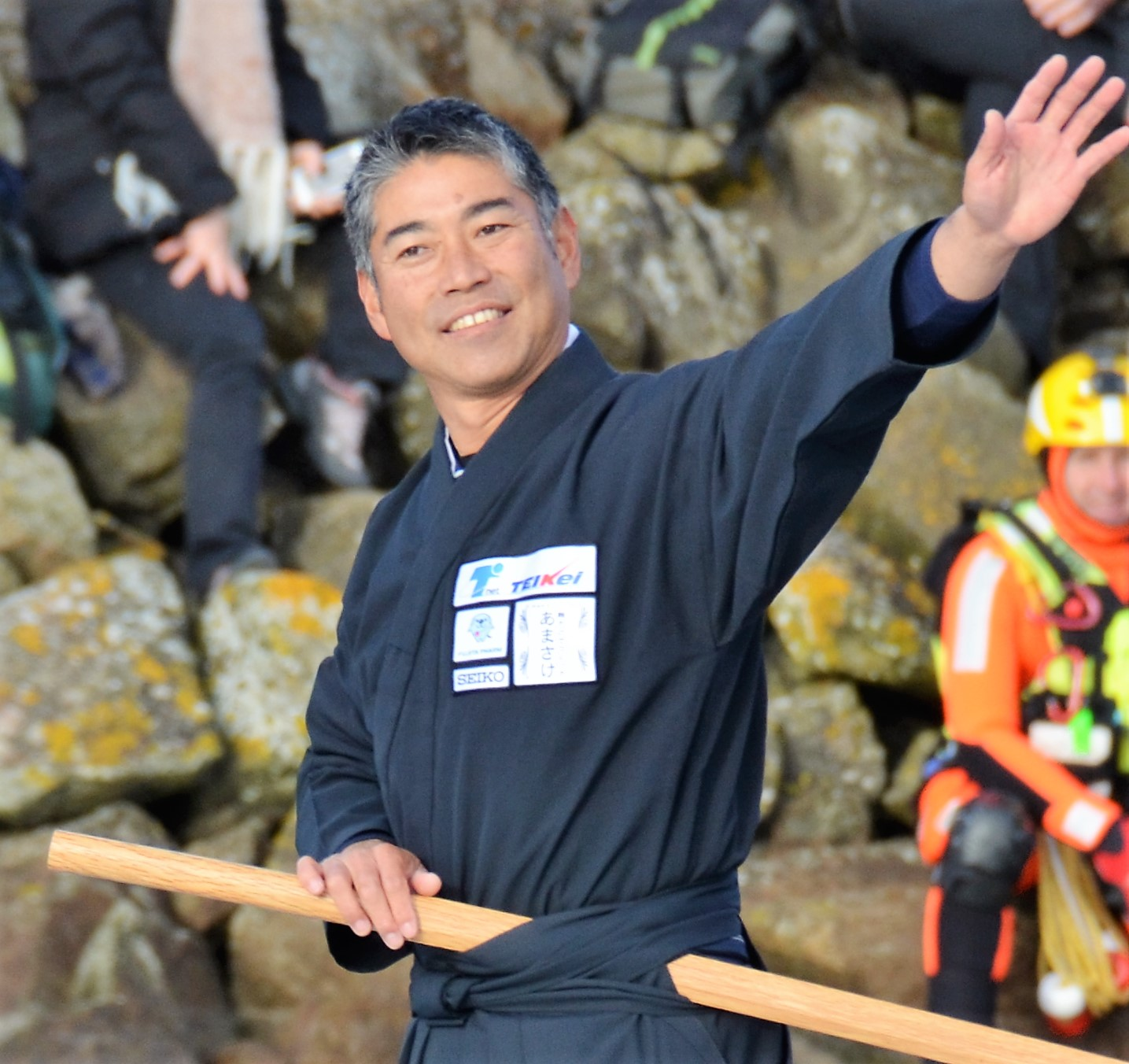
Kojiro Shiraishi (JPN)
Spirit of Yukoh

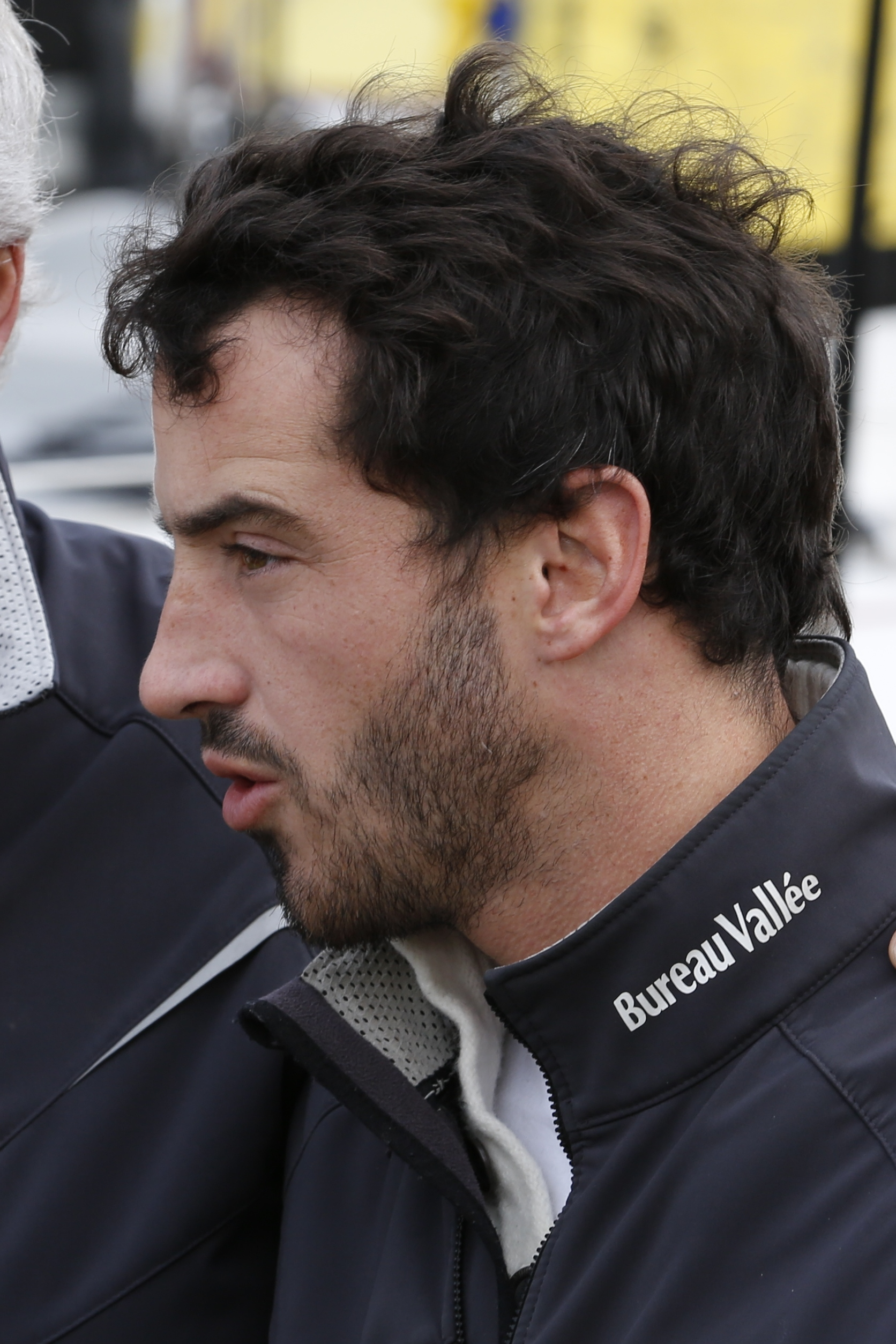
Louis Burton (FRA)
Bureau Vallée

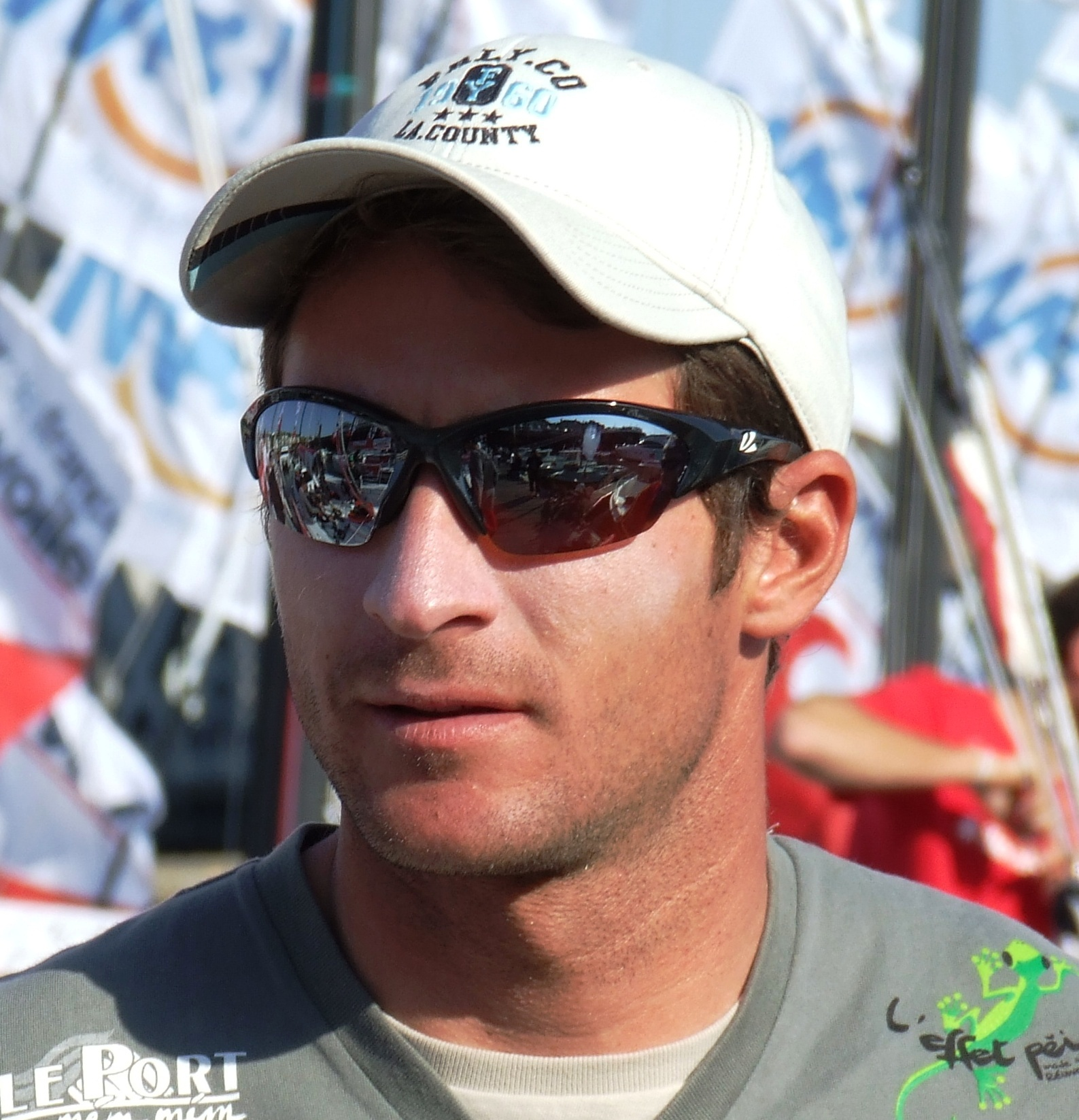
Morgan Lagravière (FRA)
Safran III

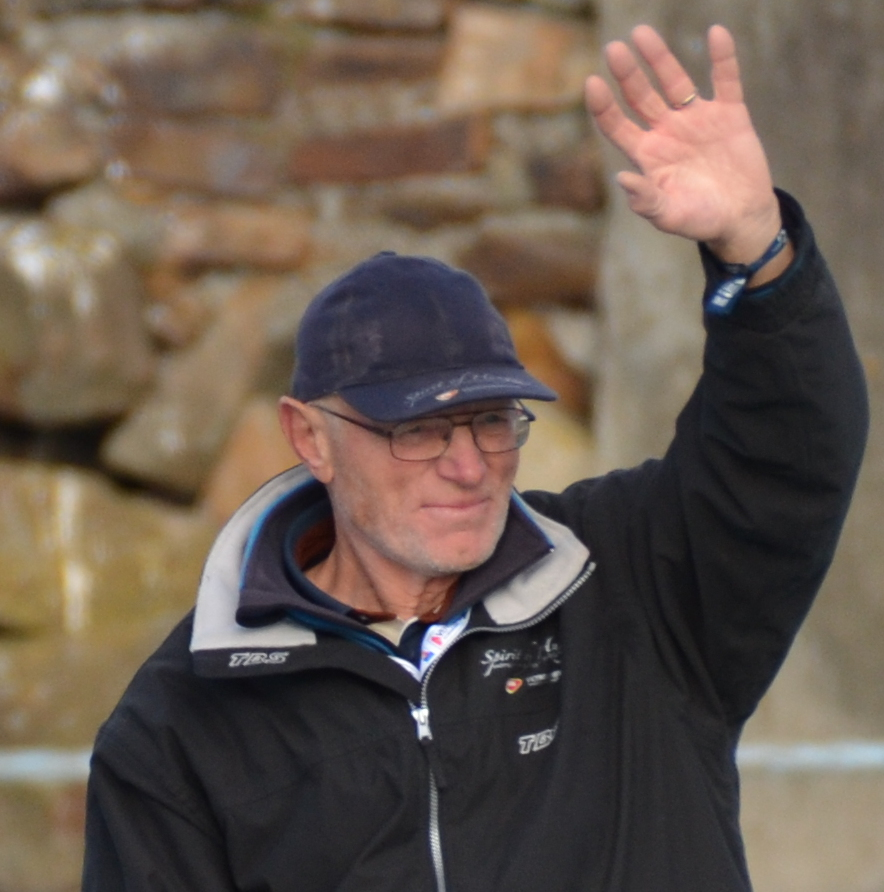
Nándor Fa (HUN)
Spirit of Hungary

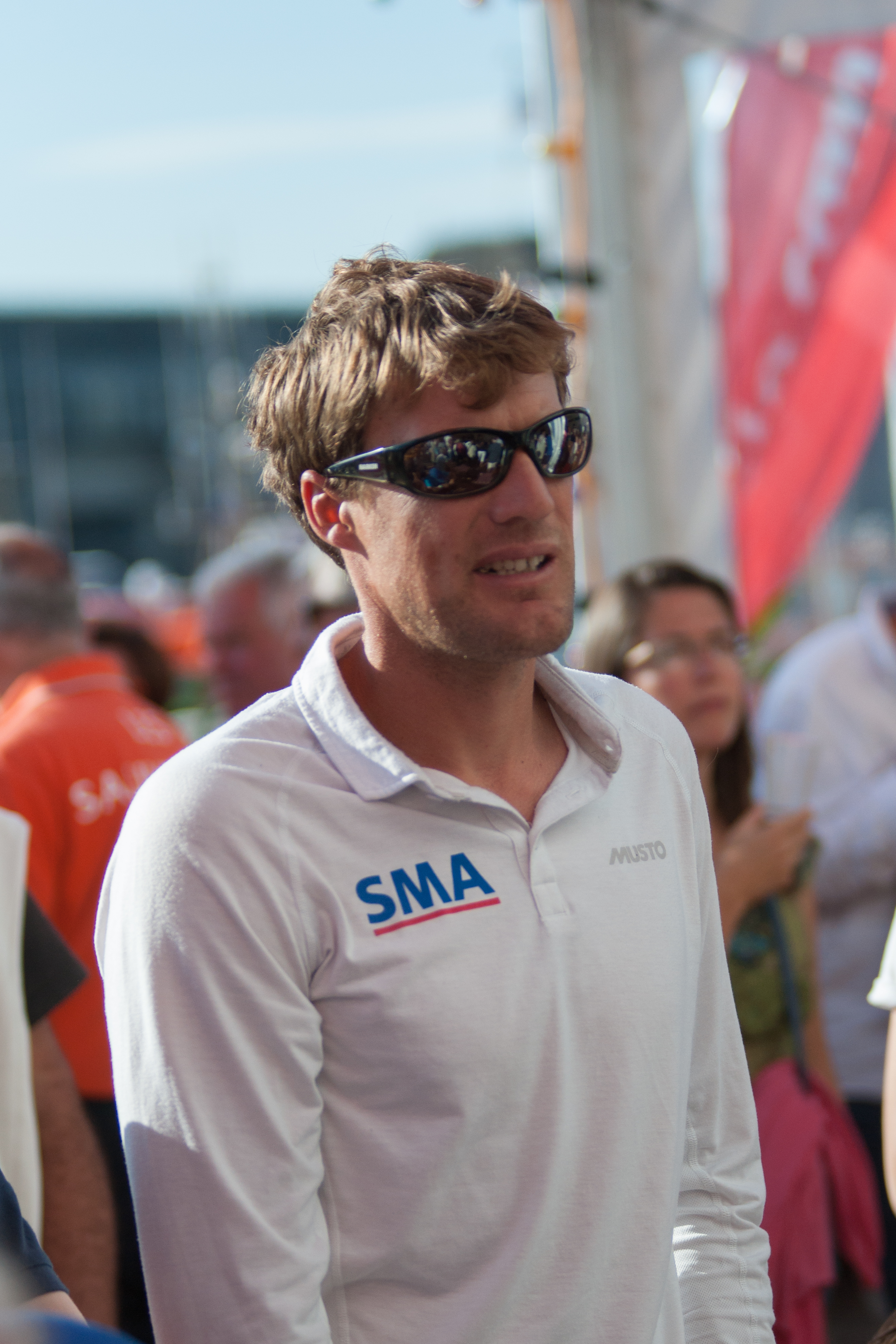
Paul Meilhat (FRA)
SMA

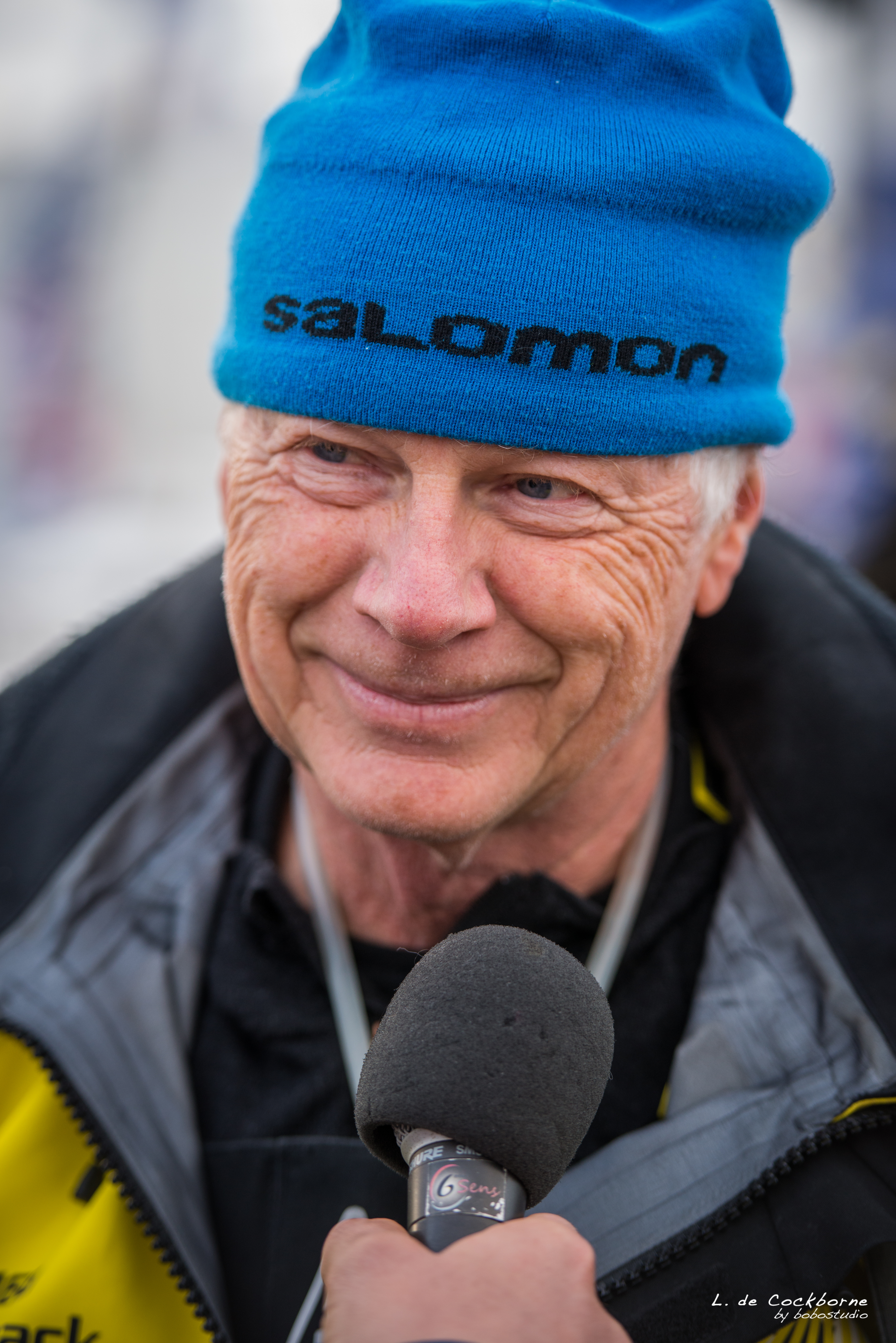
Pieter Heerema (NED)
No Way Back

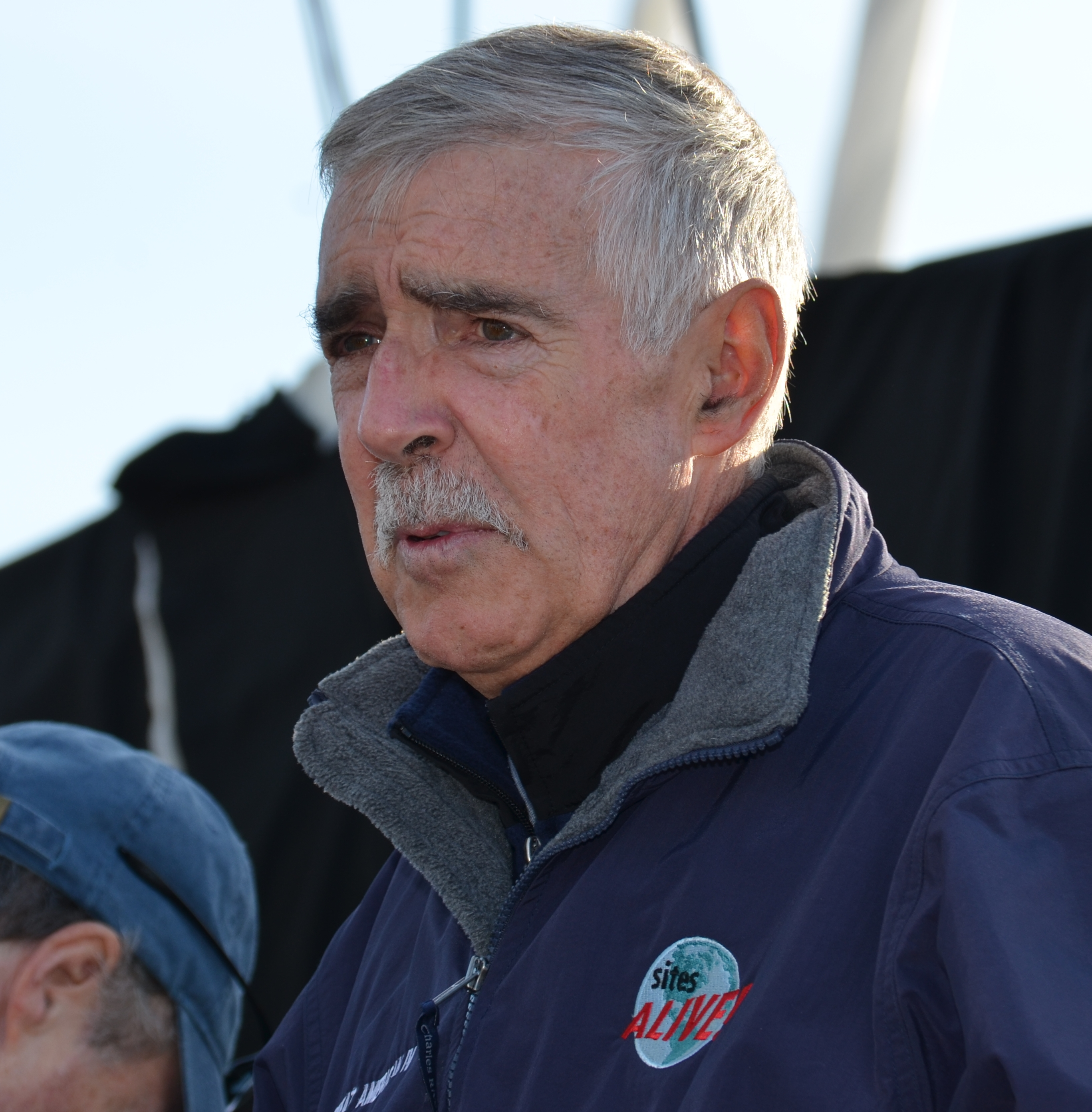
Rich Wilson (USA)
Great American IV

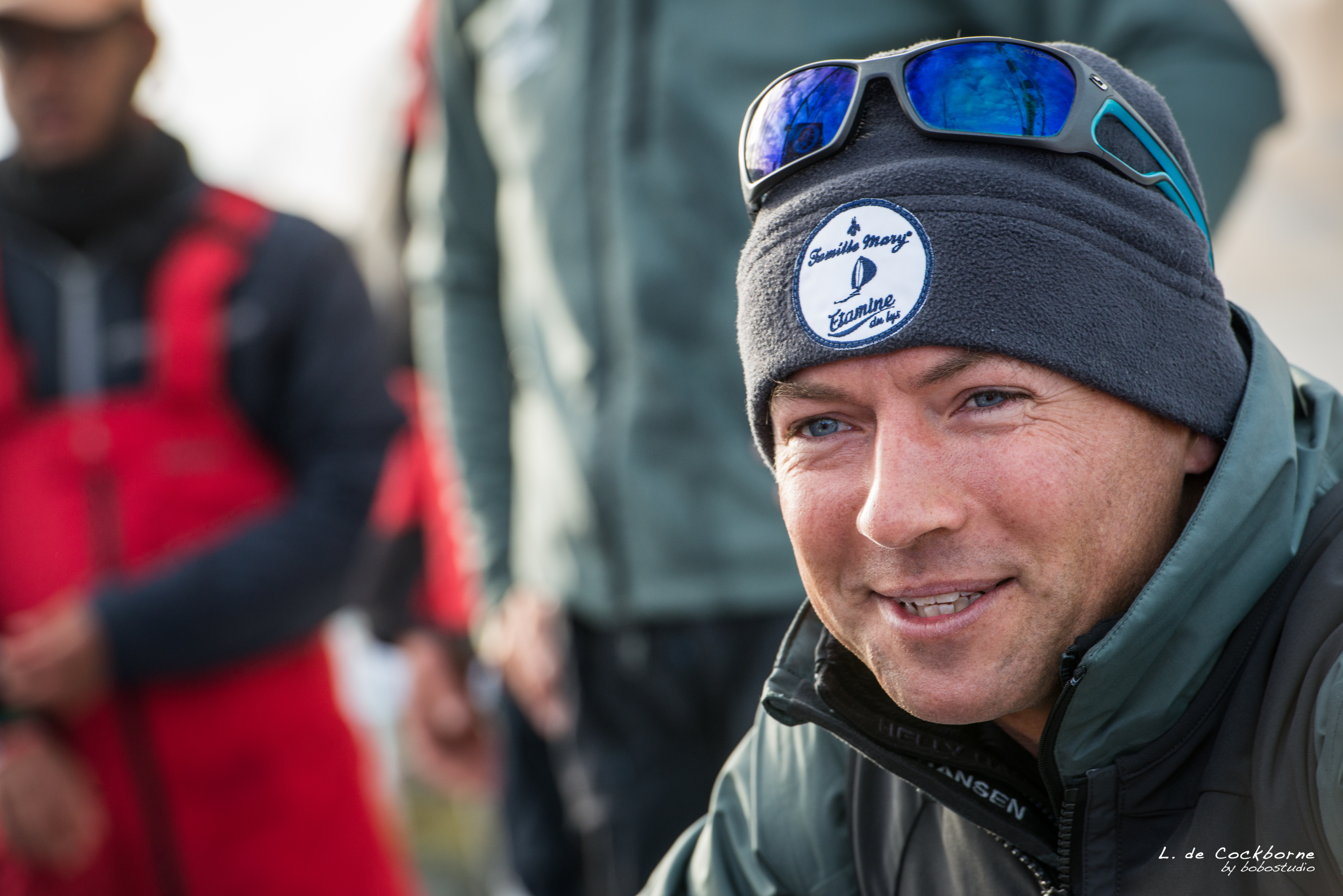
Romain Attanasio (FRA)
Famille Mary – Étamine du Lys

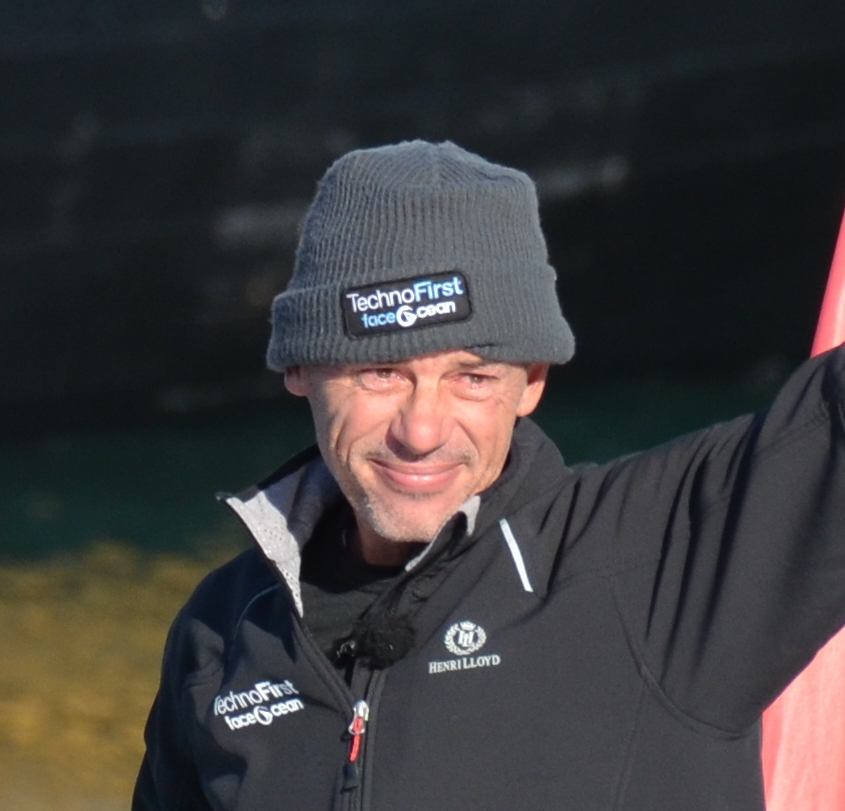
Sébastien Destremau (AUS) (FRA)
TechnoFirst-FaceOcean

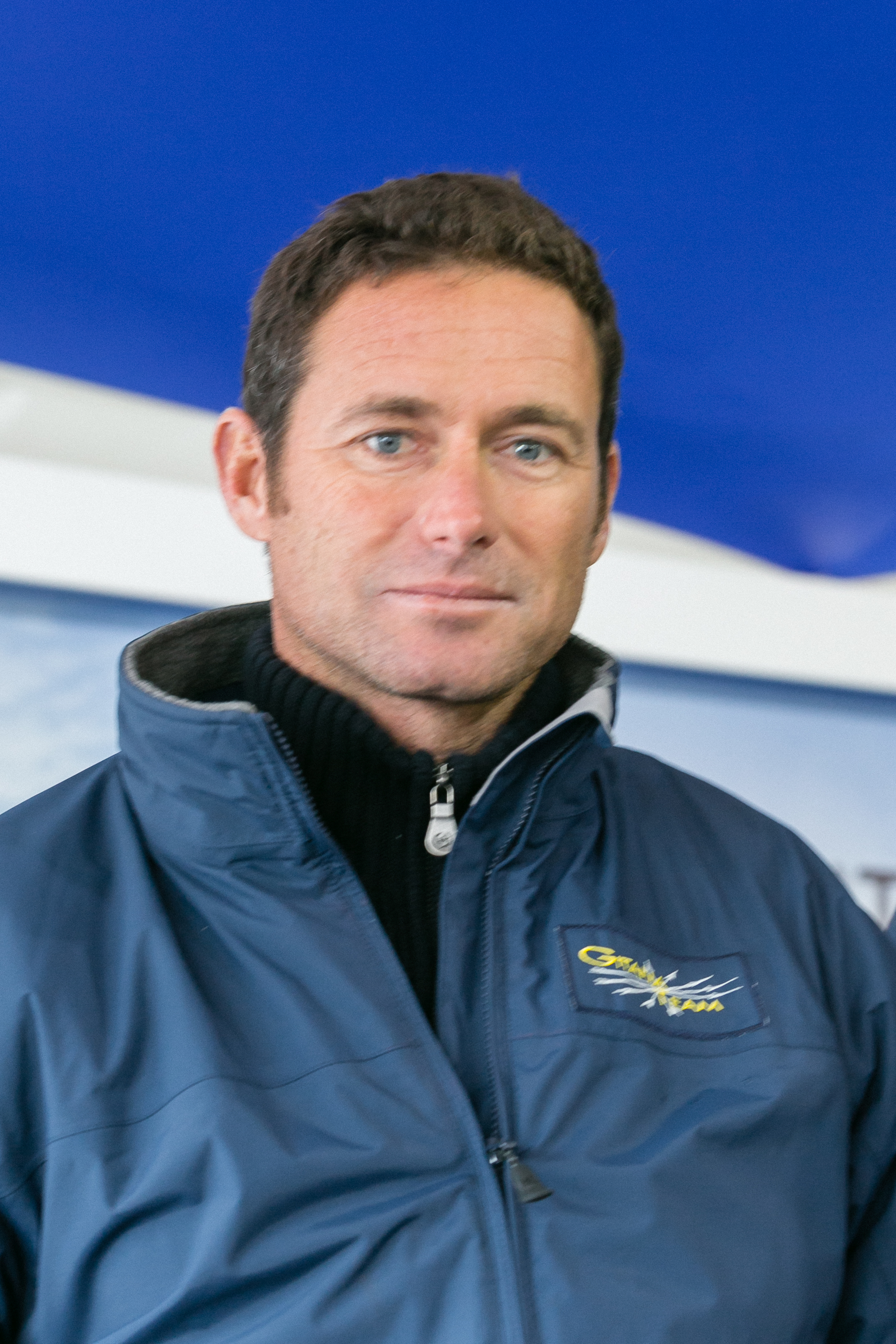
Sébastien Josse (FRA)
Gitana 16

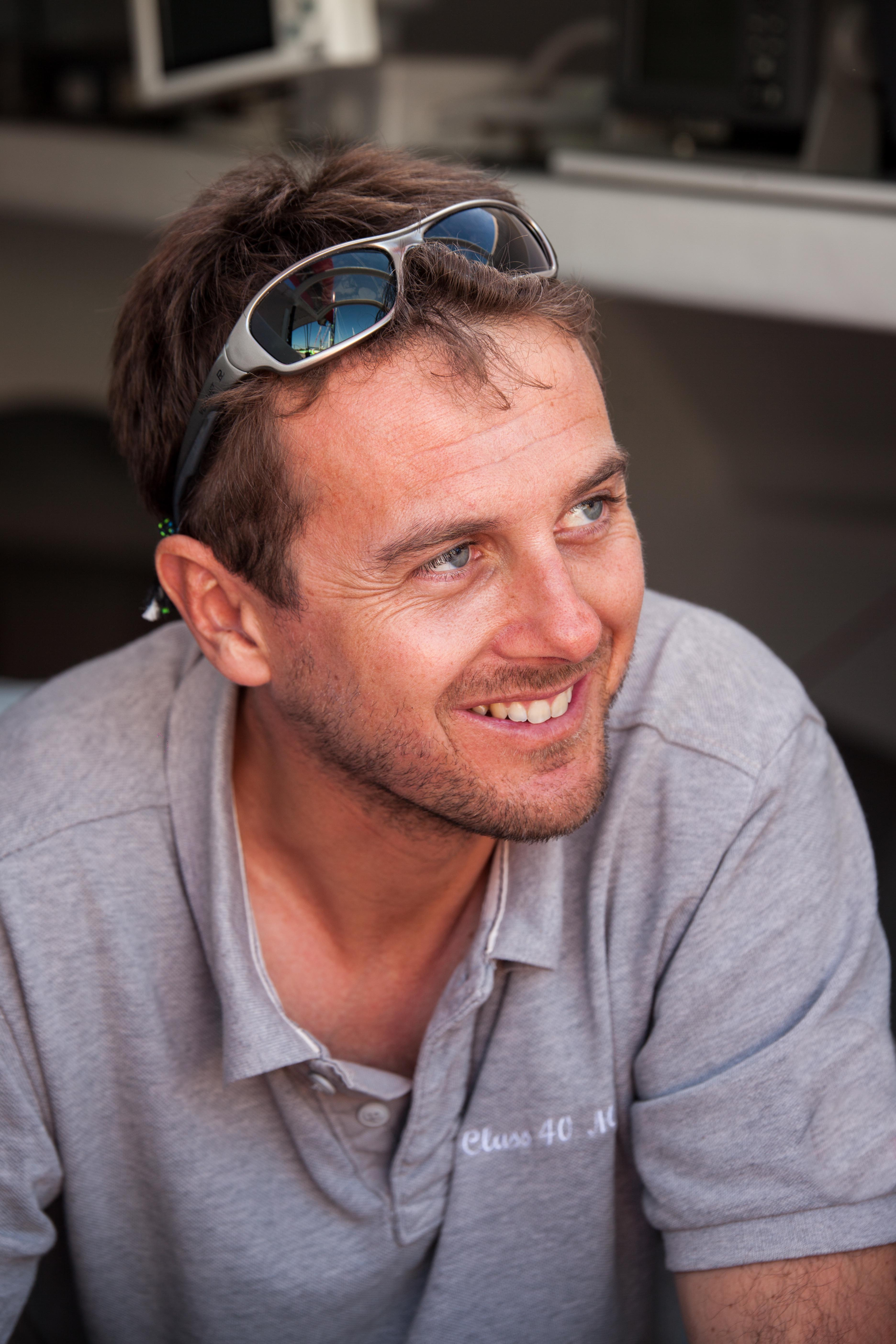
Stéphane Le Diraison (FRA)
Compagnie du Lit-Boulogne Billancourt

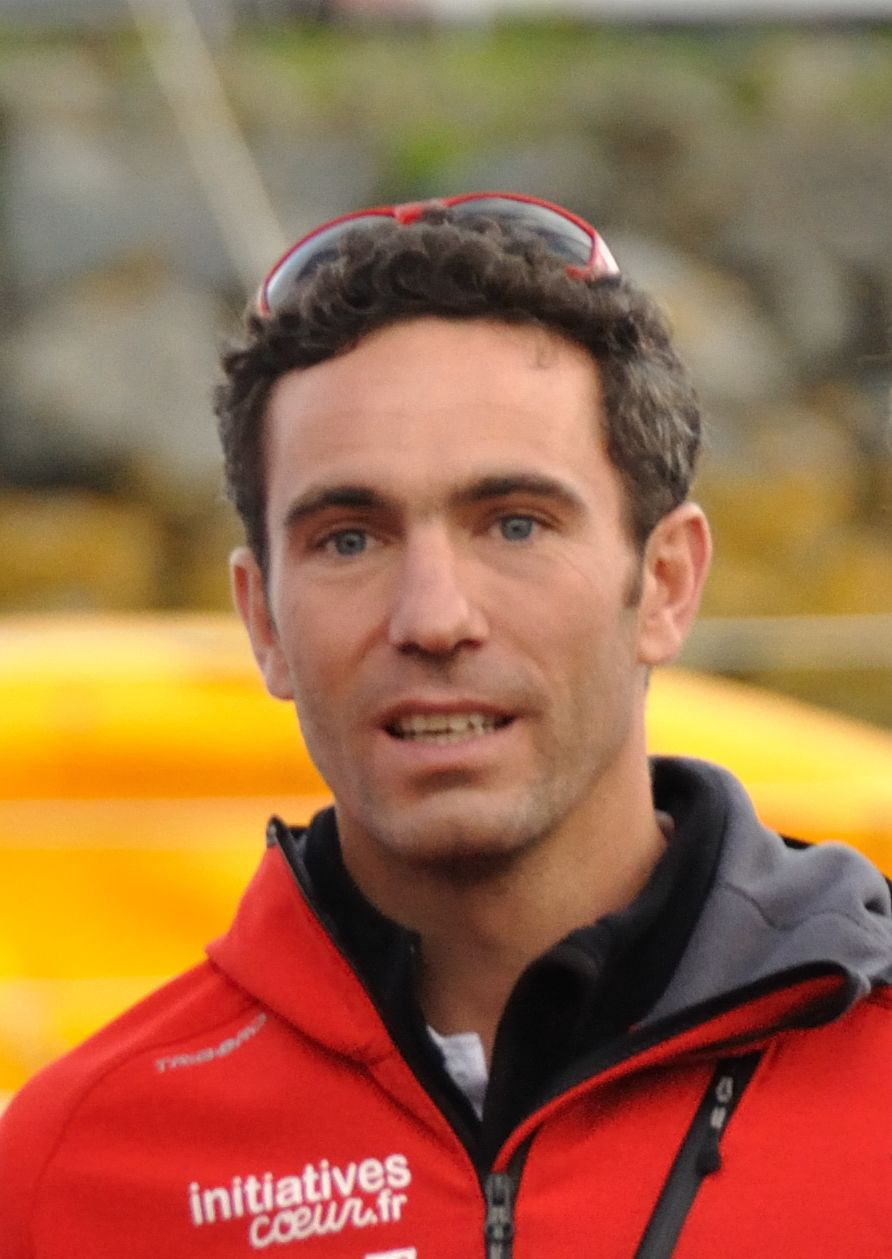
Tanguy de Lamotte (FRA)
Initiatives-Cœur (2)

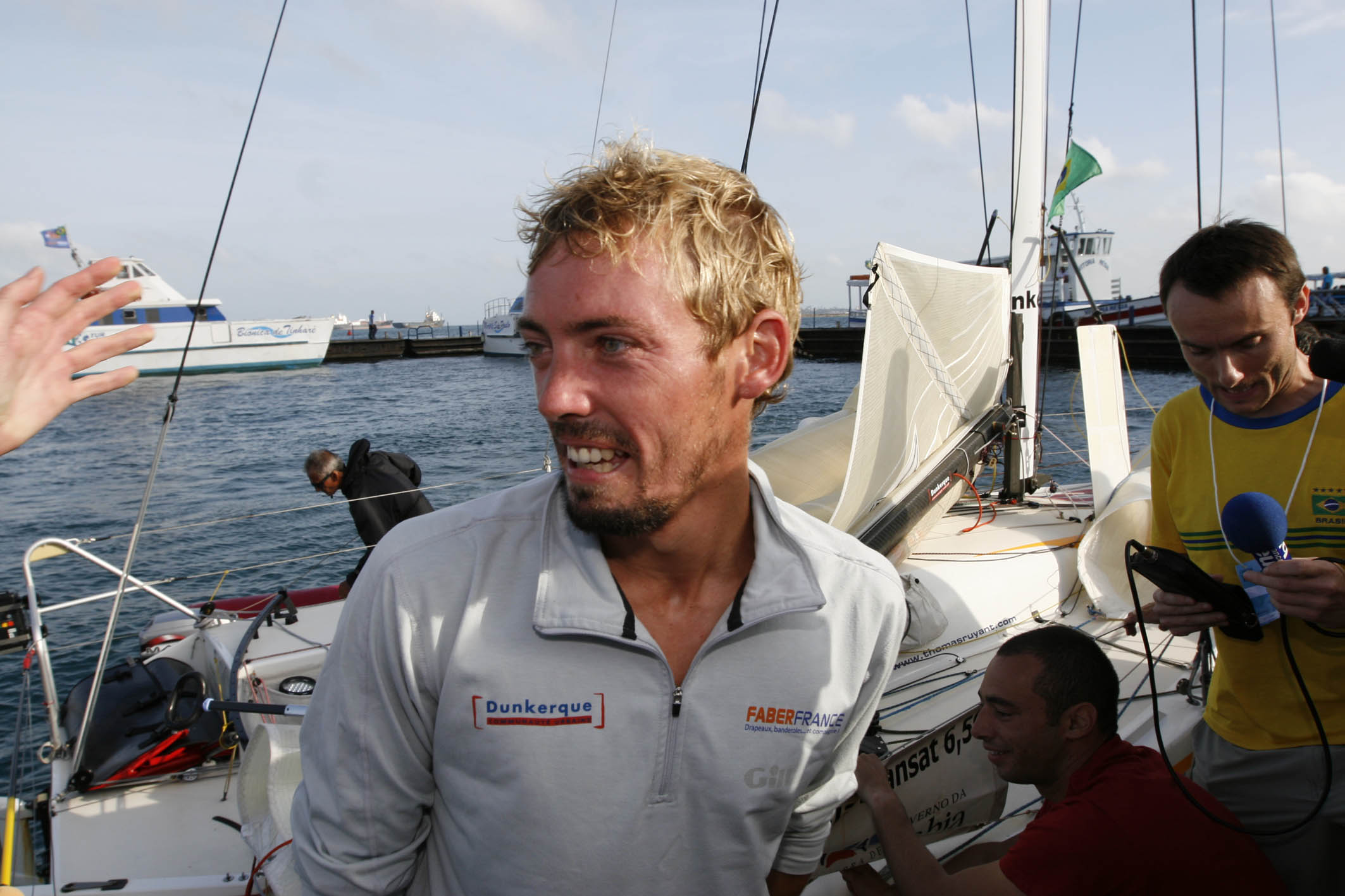
Thomas Ruyant (FRA)
Le Souffle du Nord

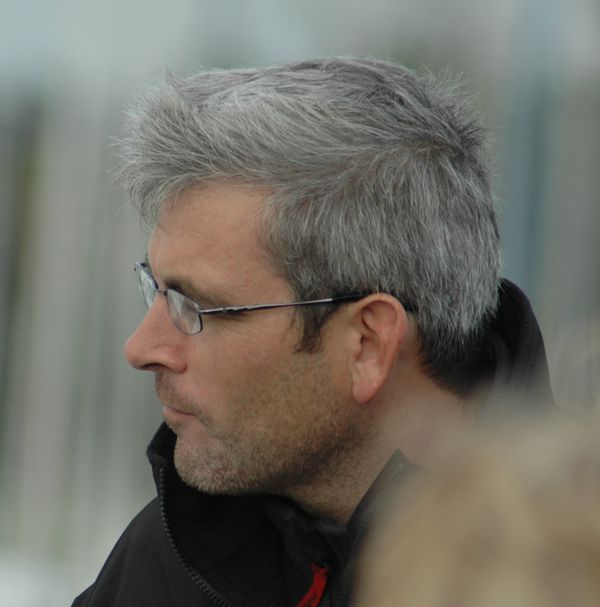
Vincent Riou (FRA)
PRB

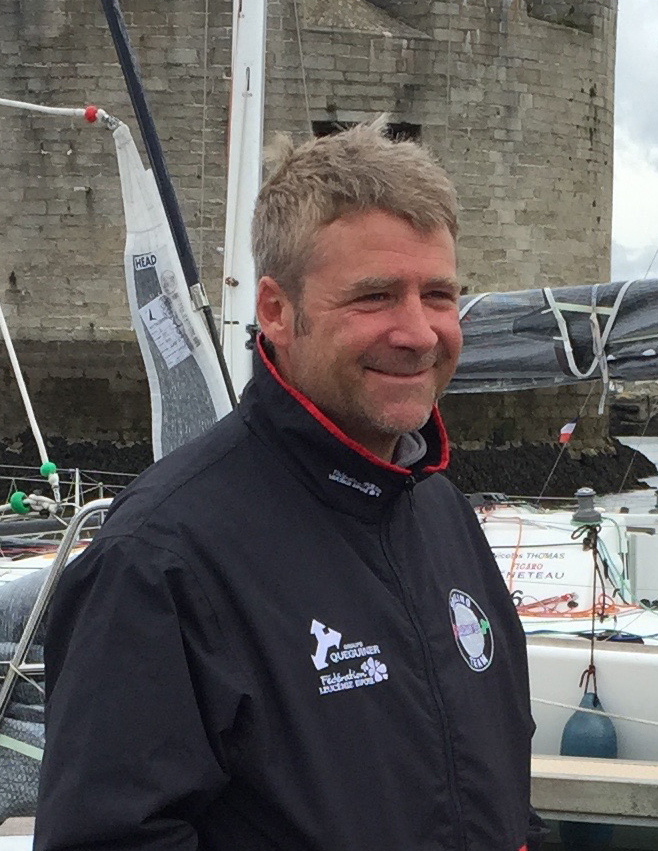
Yann Eliès (FRA)
Quéguiner – Leucémie Espoir

=== Gallery of yachts ===
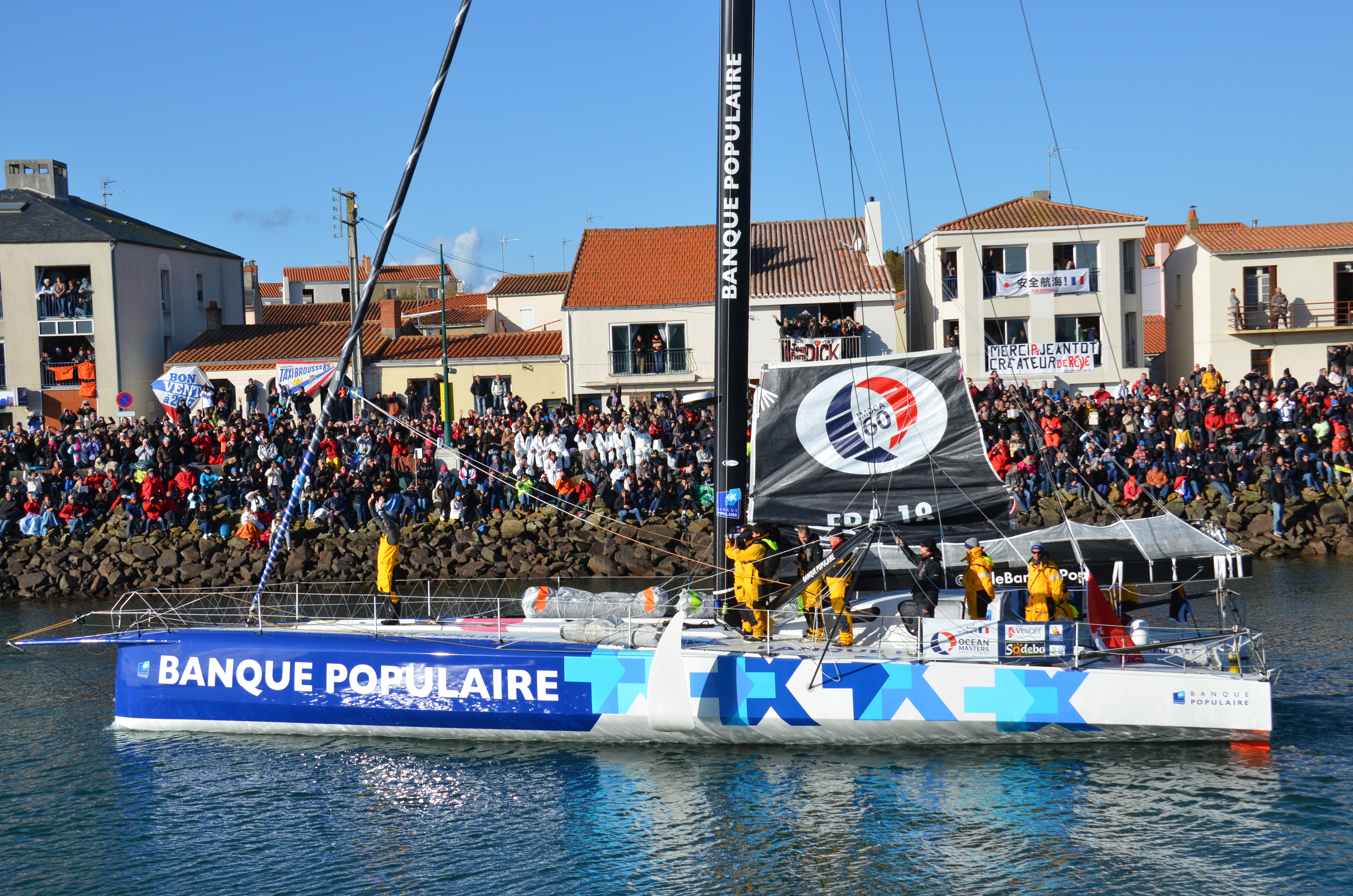
Banque populaire VIIIArmel Le Cléac'h (FRA)

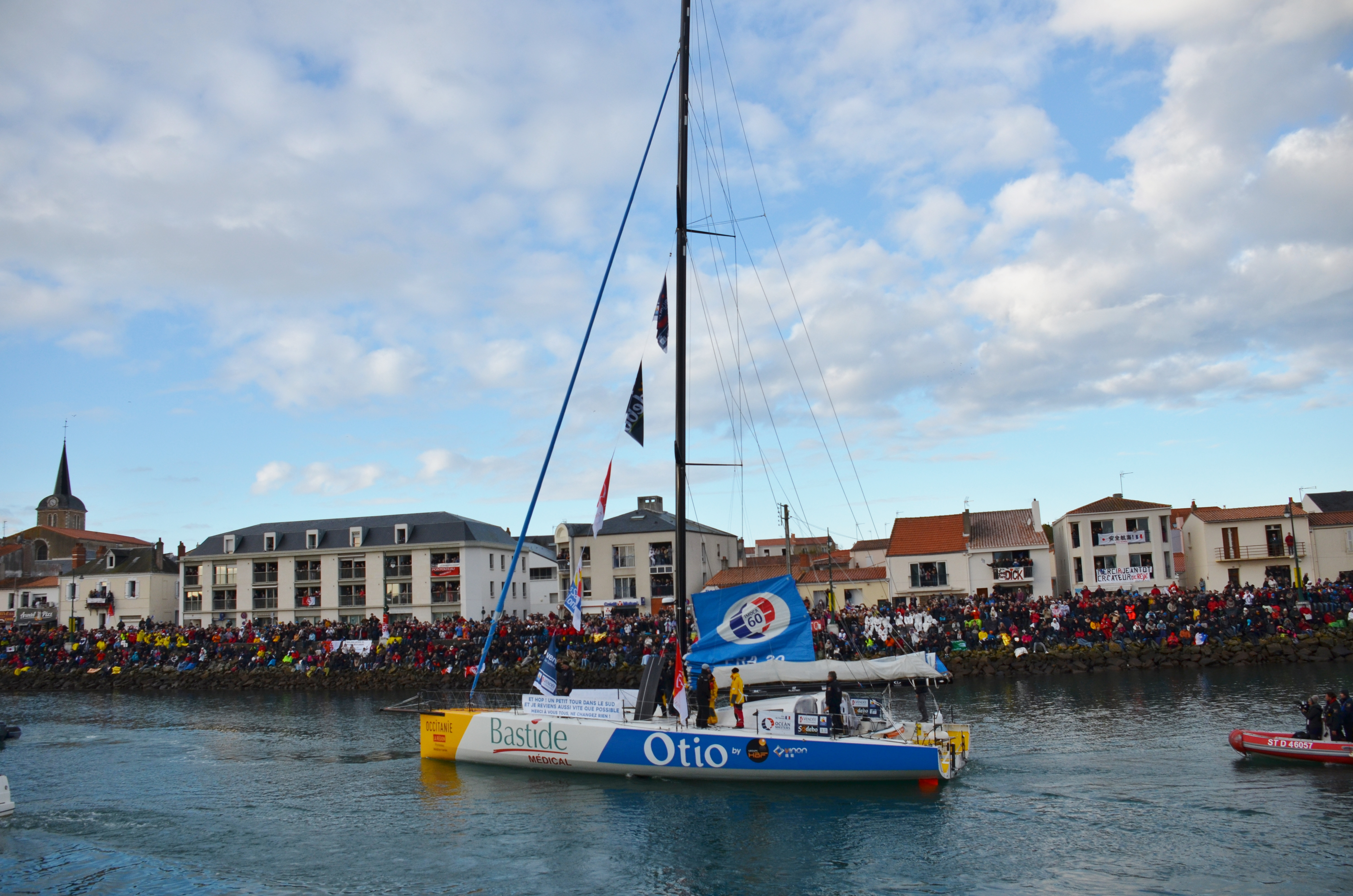
Bastide-Otio
Kito de Pavant (FRA)

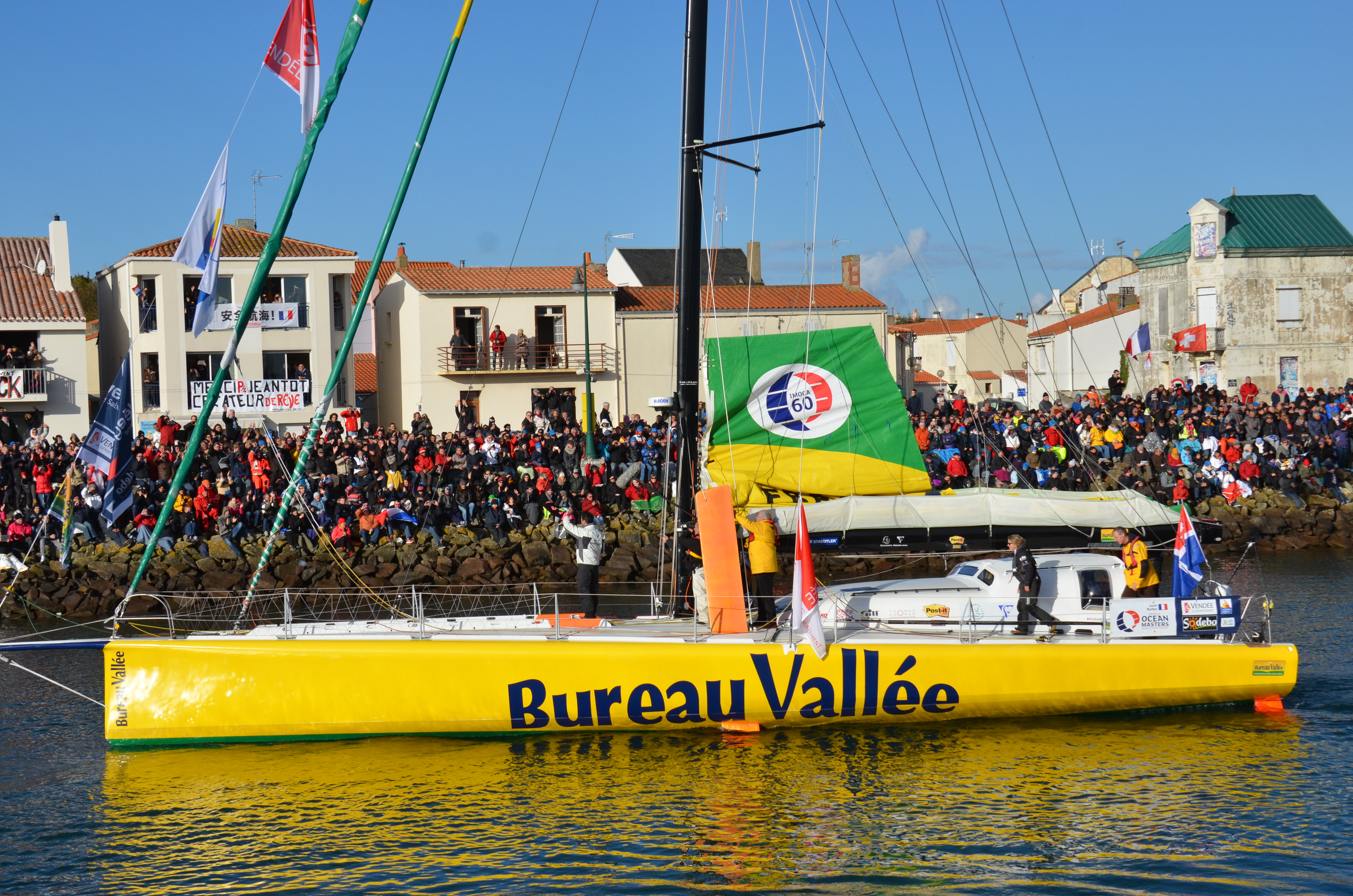
Bureau Vallée
Louis Burton (FRA)

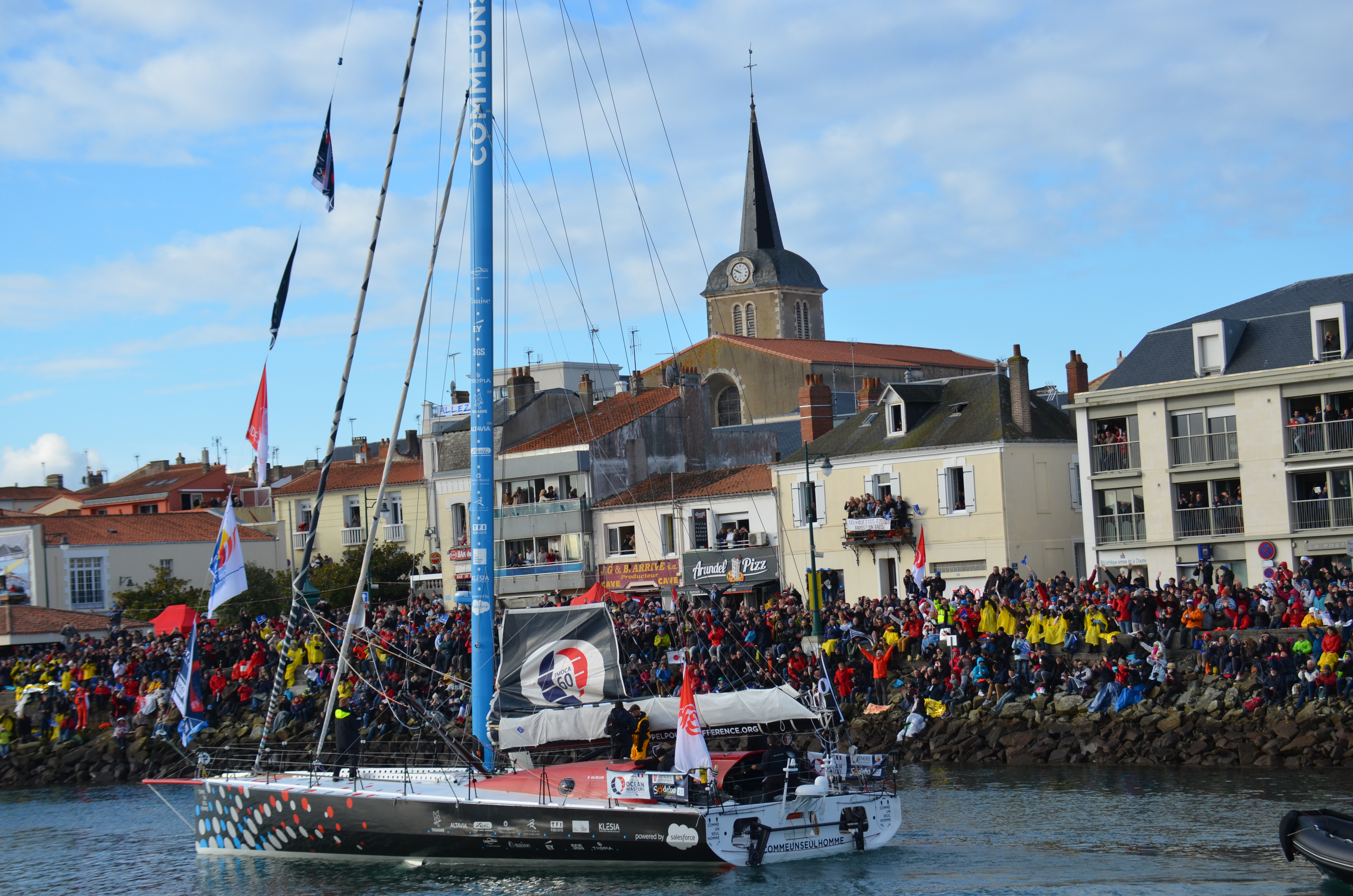
Comme un seul homme
Éric Bellion (FRA)

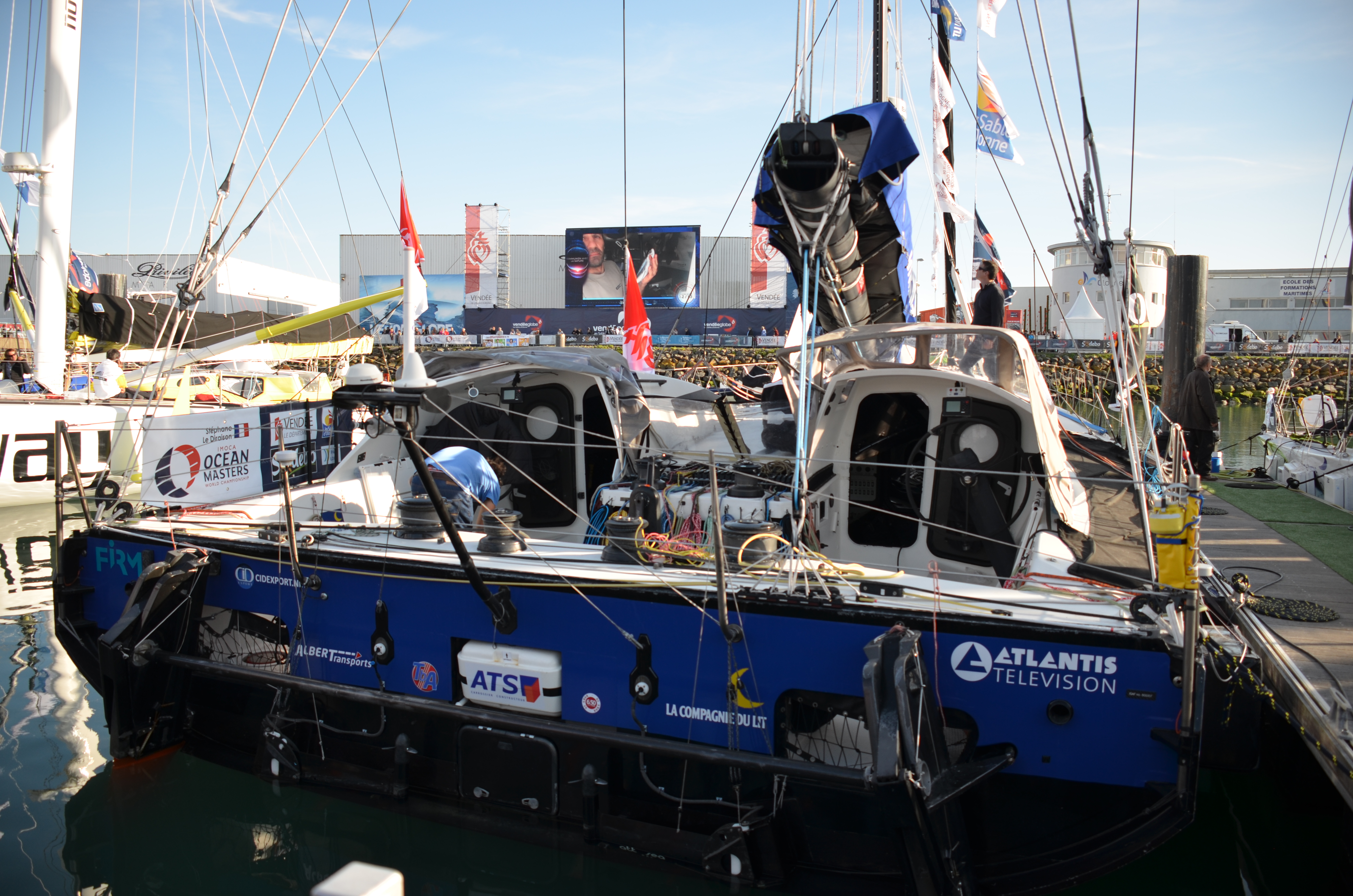
Compagnie du Lit-Boulogne Billancourt
Stéphane Le Diraison (FRA)

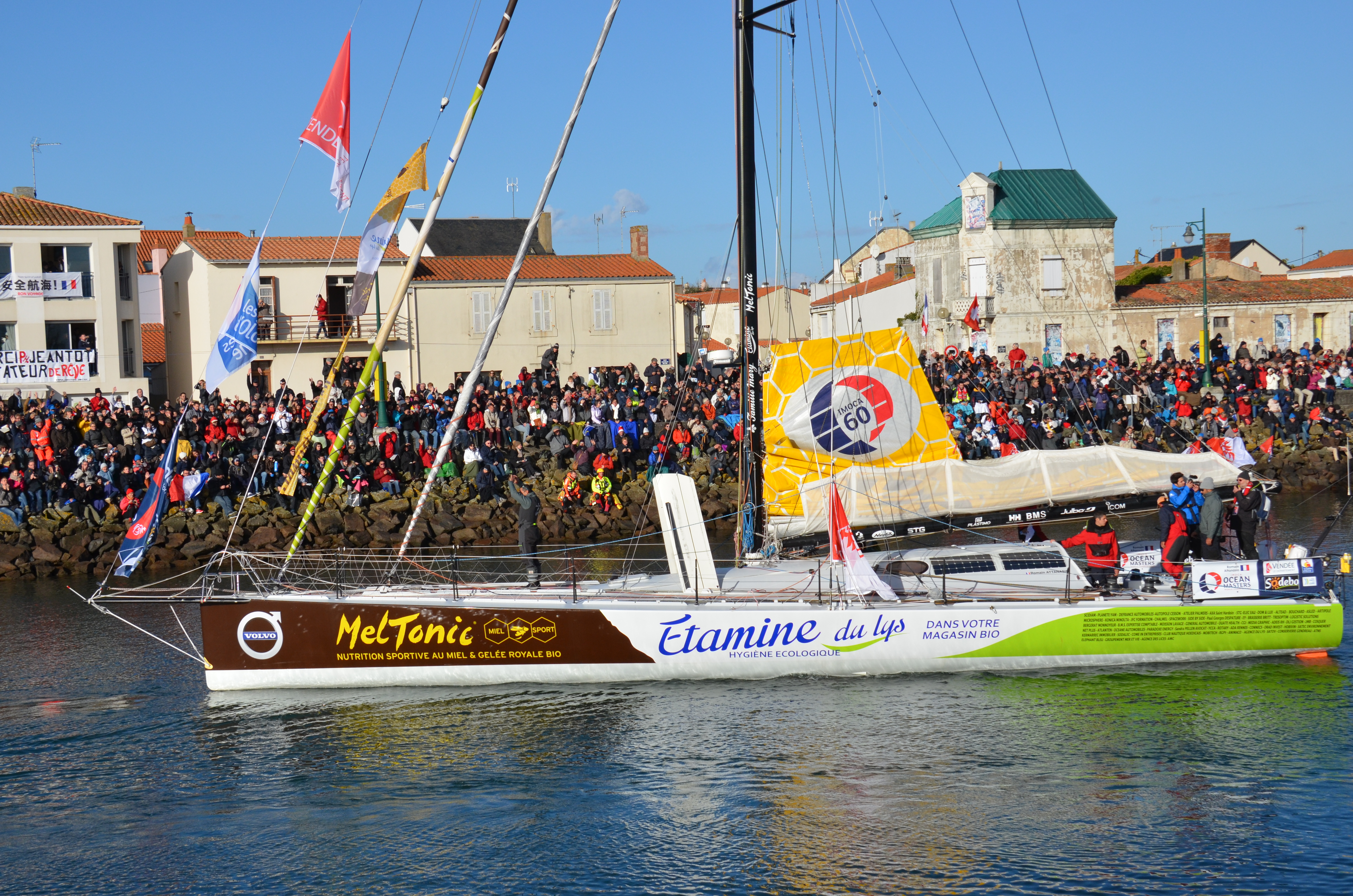
Famille Mary – Étamine du Lys
Romain Attanasio (FRA)

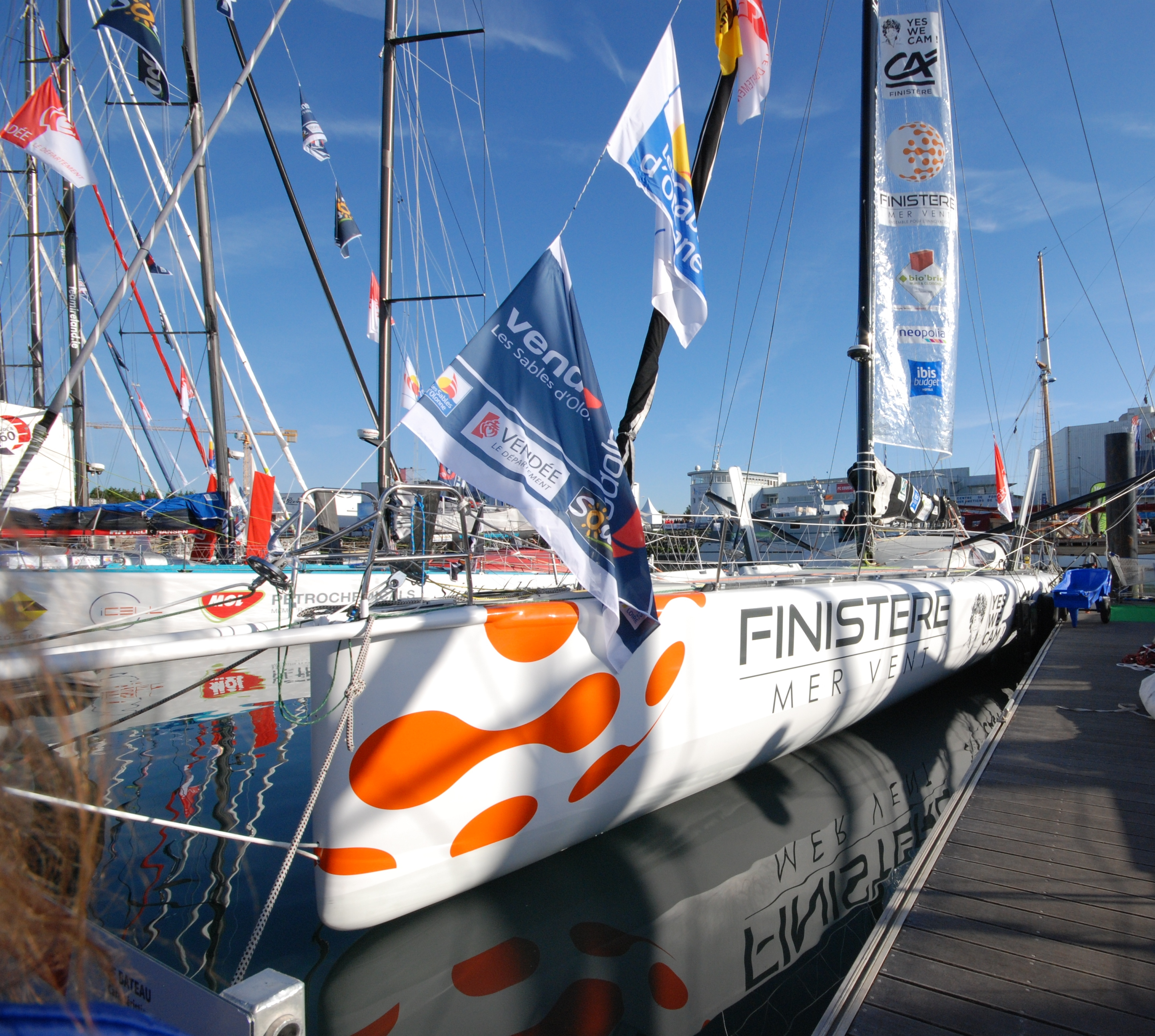
Finistère Mer Vent
Jean Le Cam (FRA)

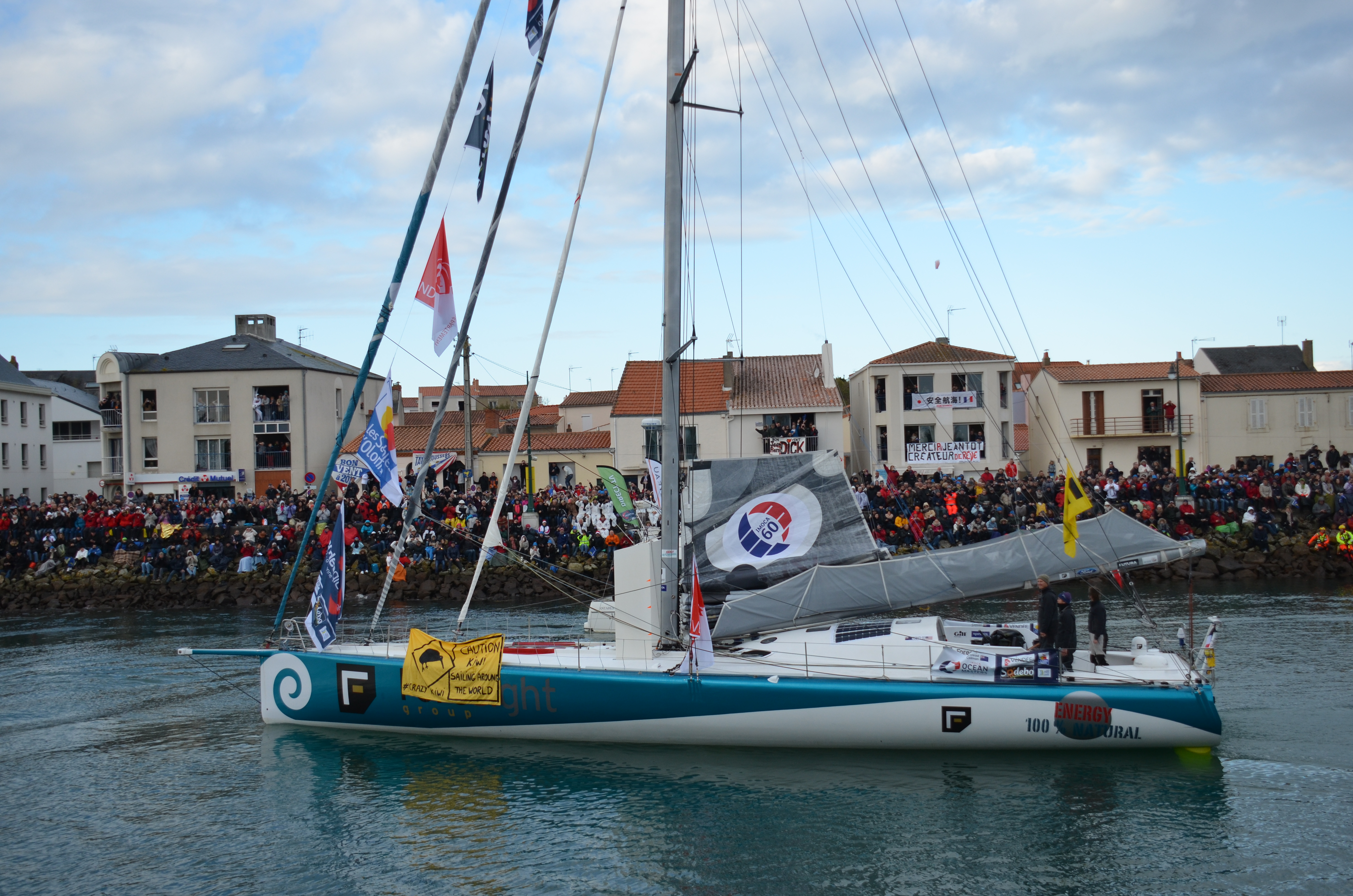
Foresight Natural Energy
Conrad Colman (NZL) (USA)

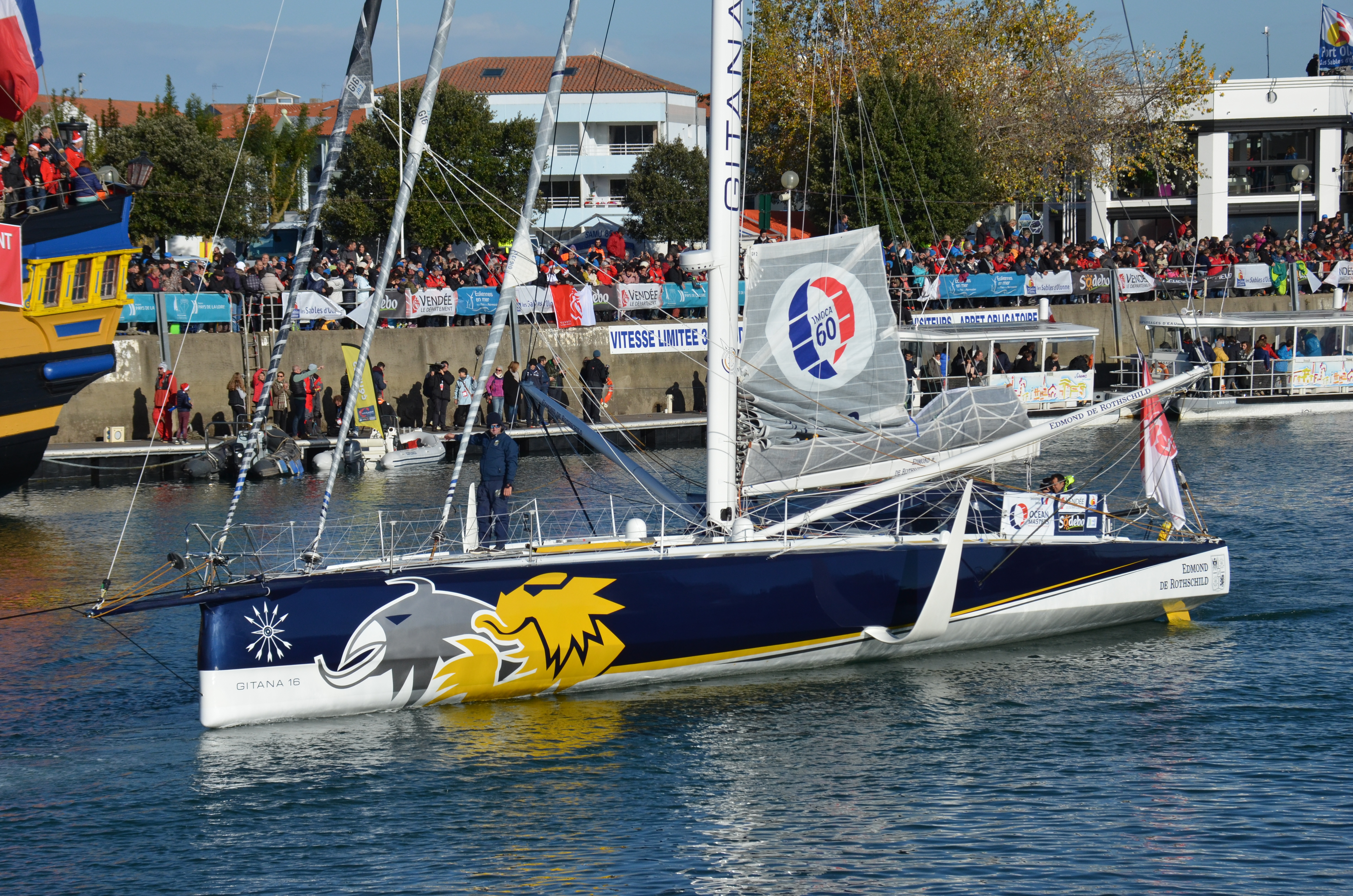
Gitana 16
Sébastien Josse (FRA)

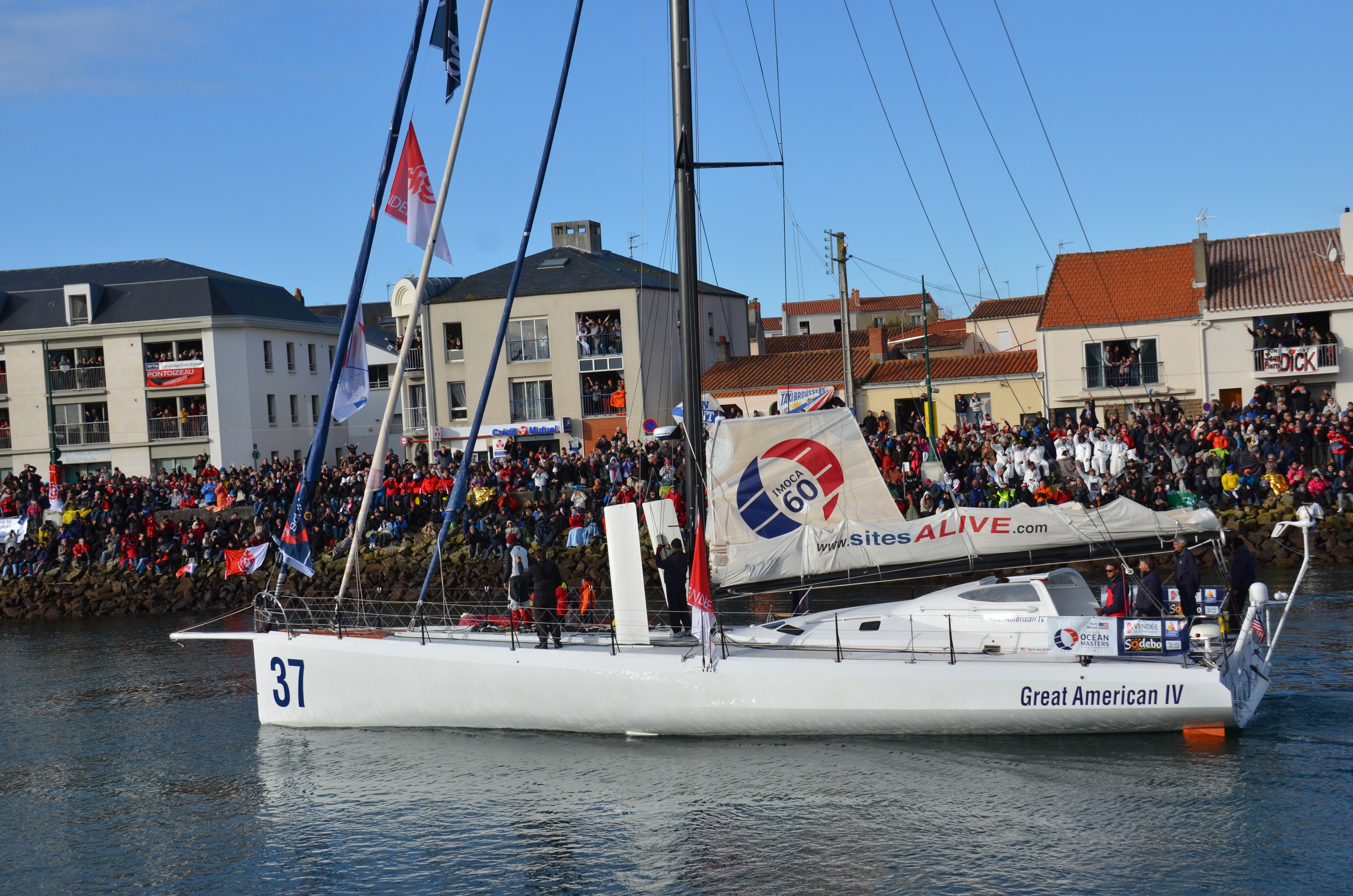
Great American IV
Rich Wilson (USA)

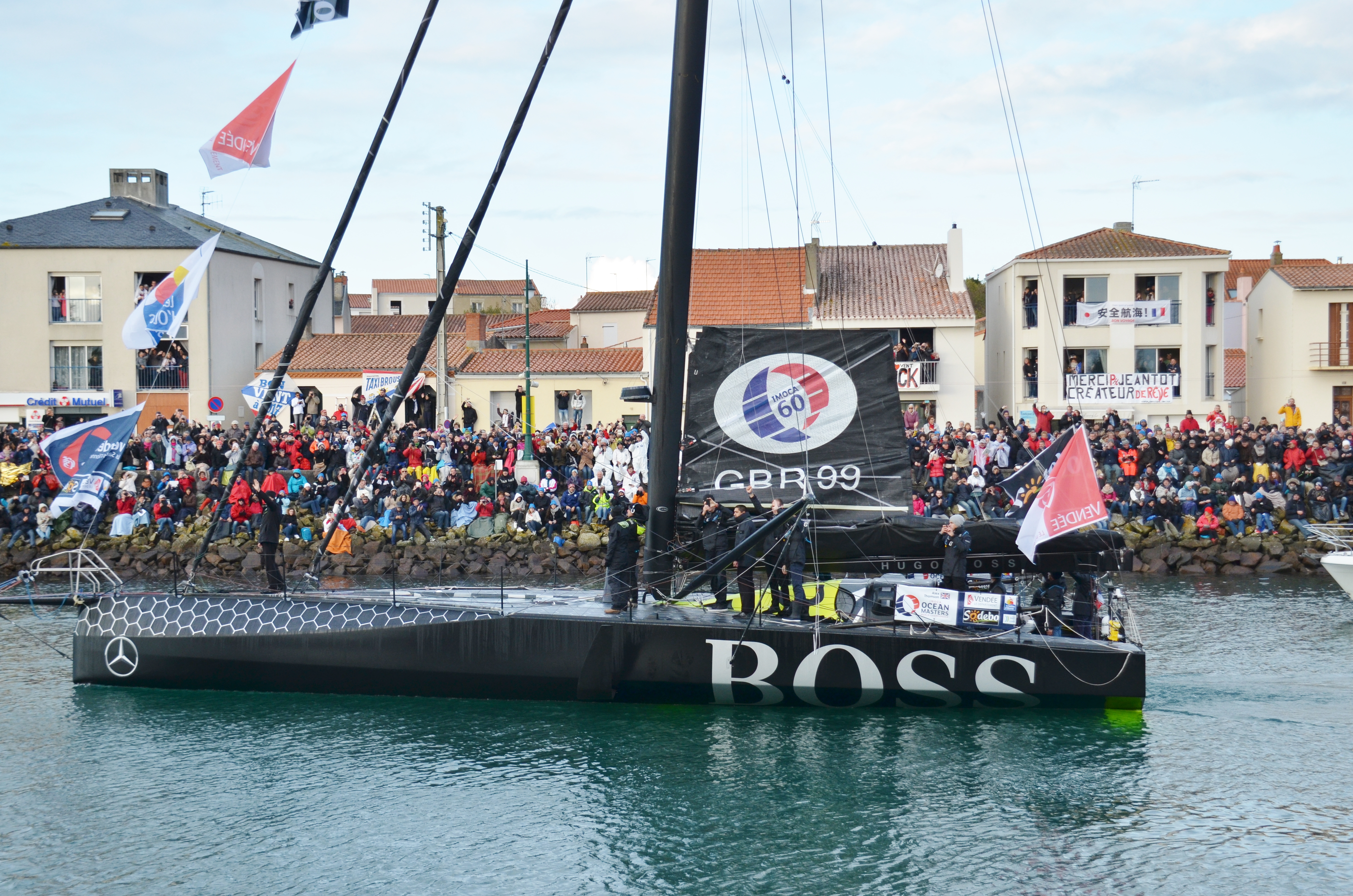
Hugo Boss 6
Alex Thomson (GBR)

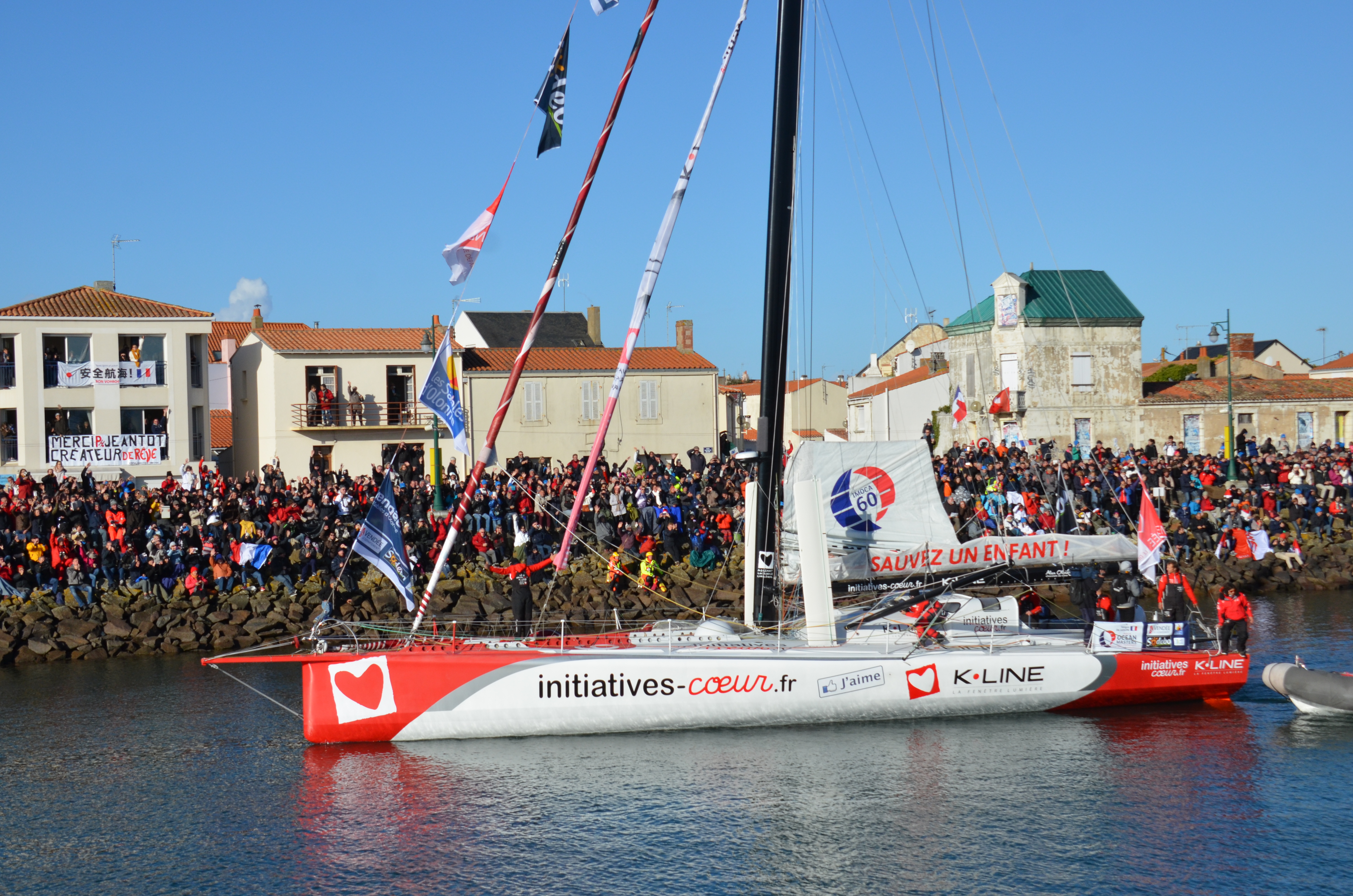
Initiatives-Cœur (2)
Tanguy de Lamotte (FRA)

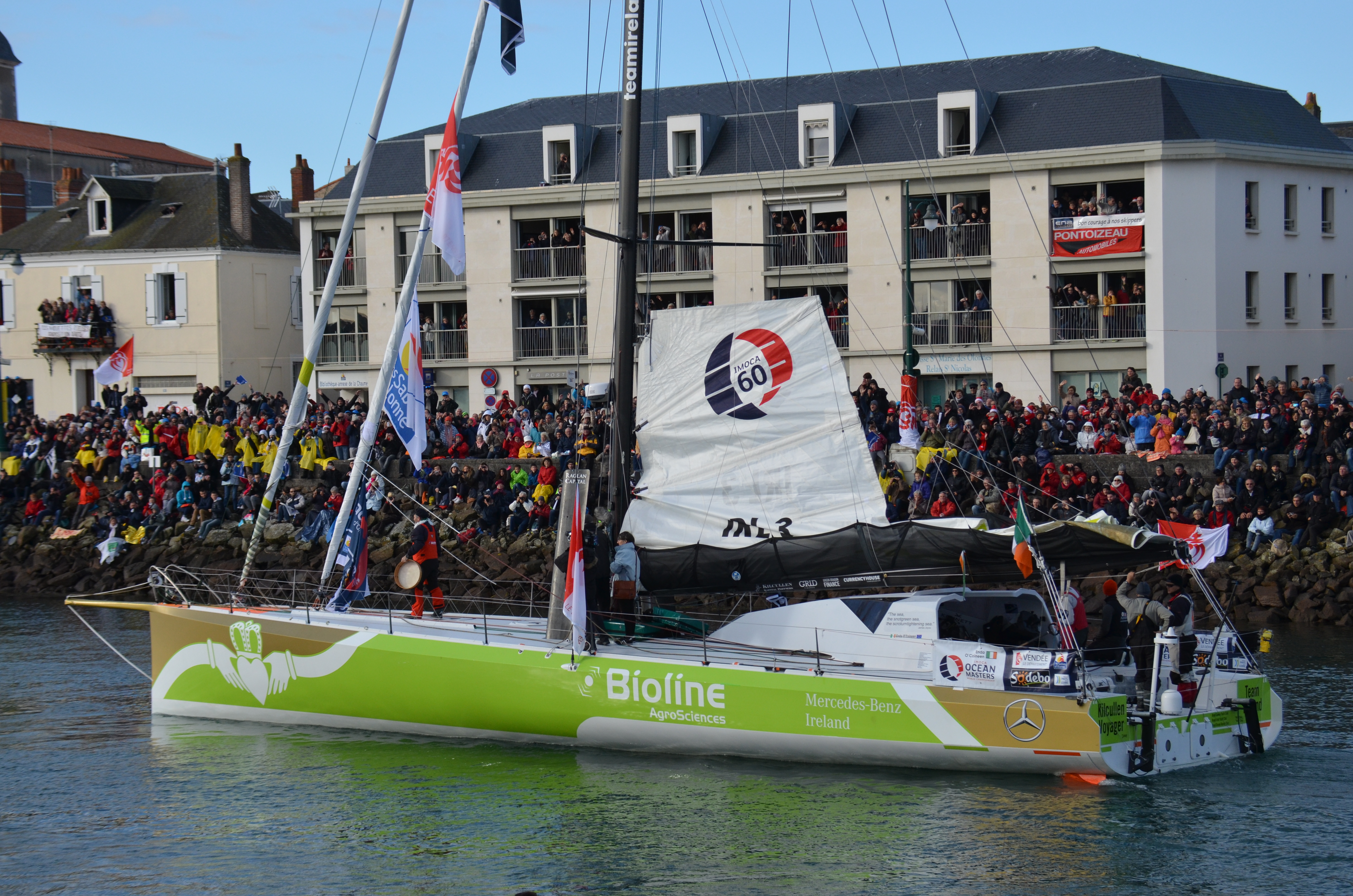
Kilcullen Voyager - Team Ireland
Enda O'Coineen (IRL)

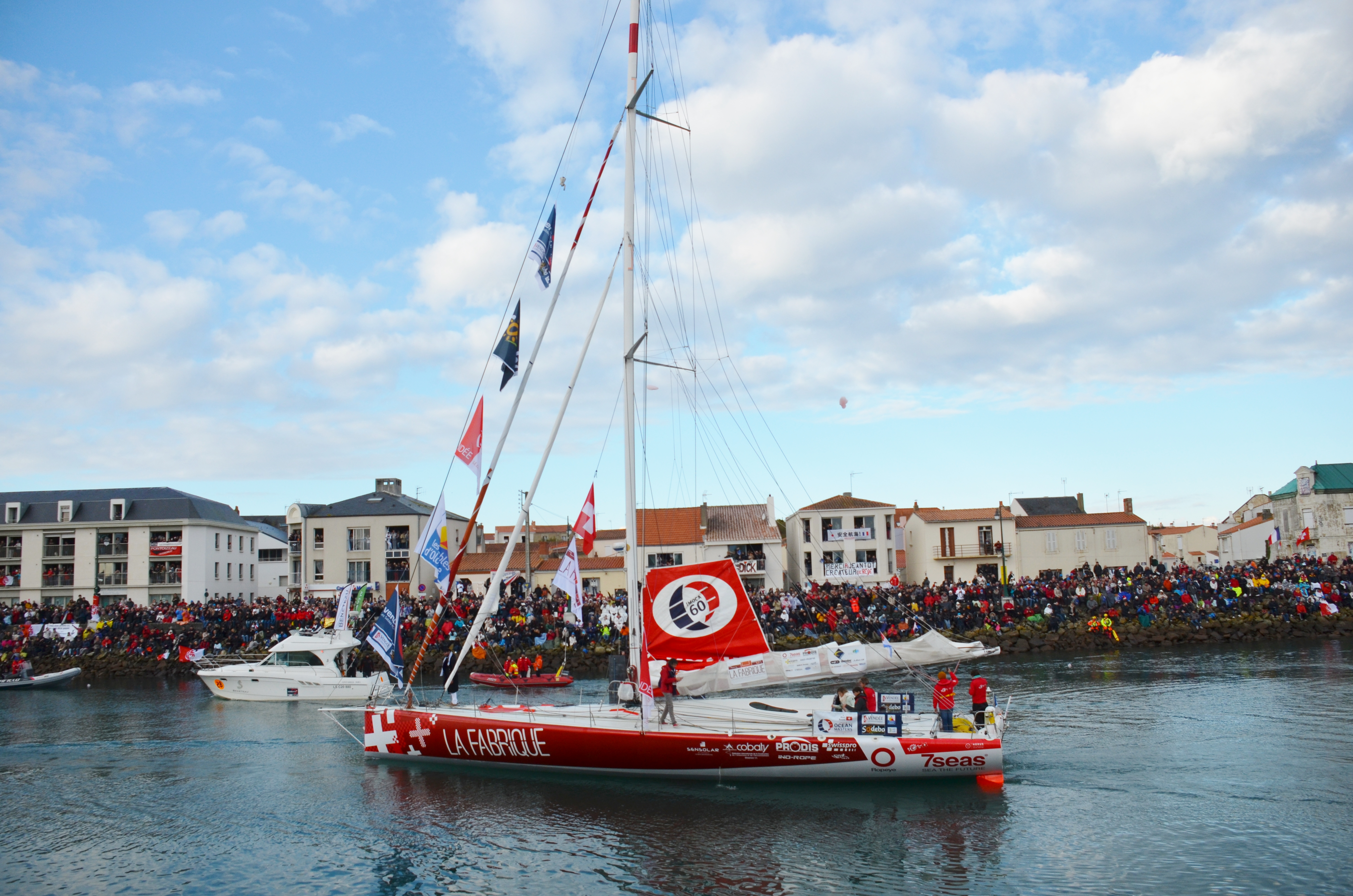
La Fabrique
Alan Roura (SUI)

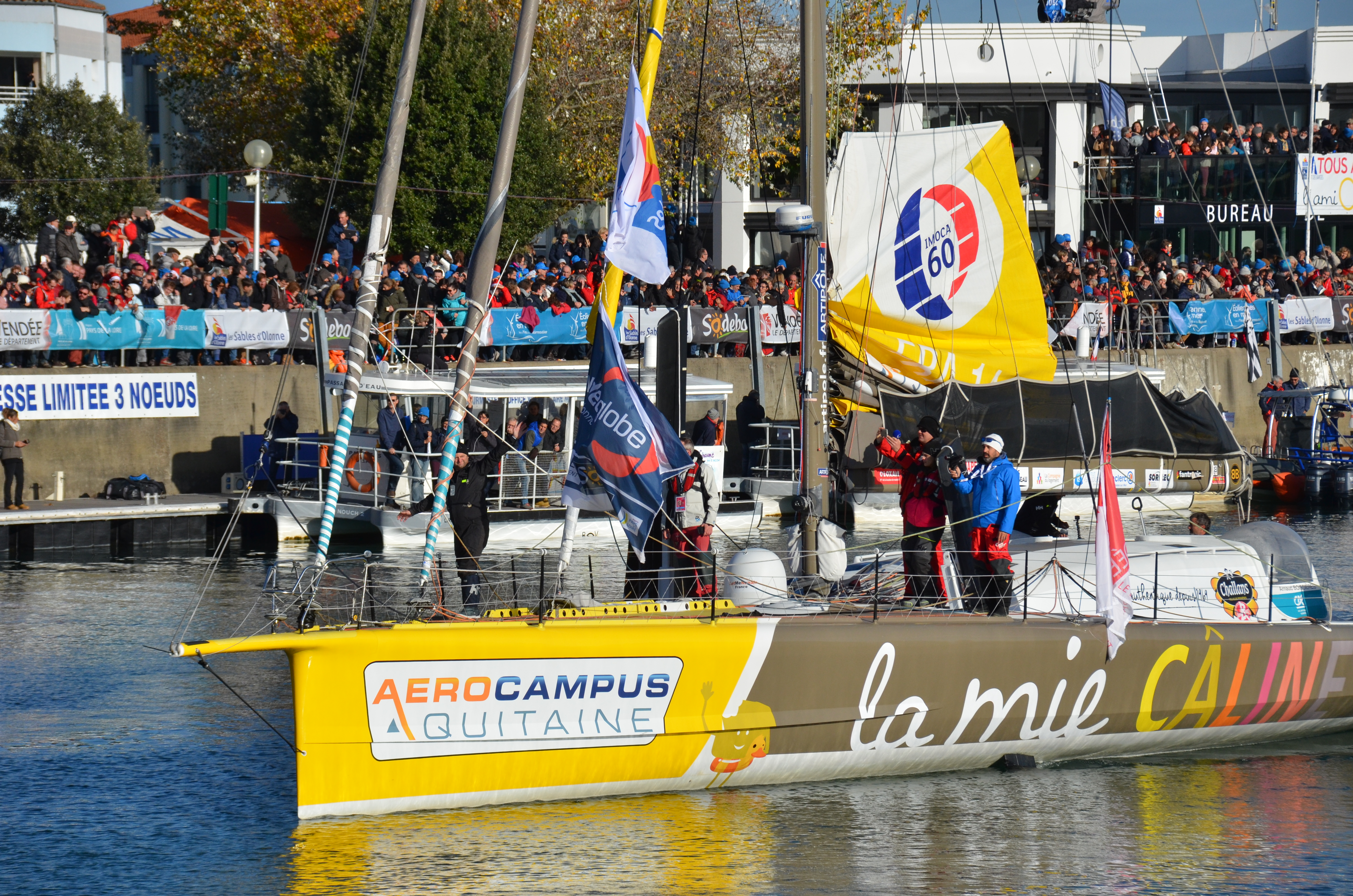
La Mie câline
Arnaud Boissières (FRA)

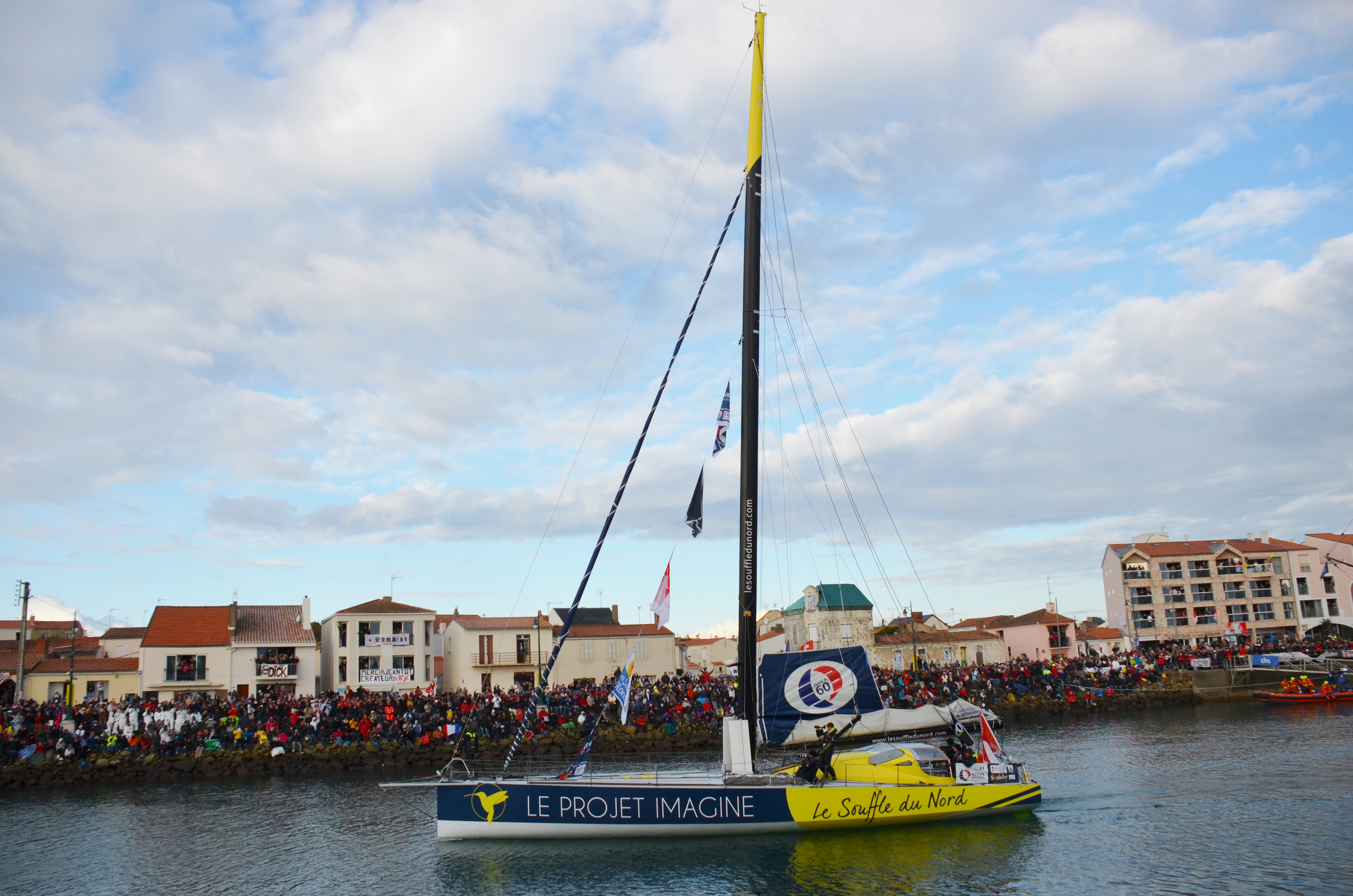
Le Souffle du Nord
Thomas Ruyant (FRA)

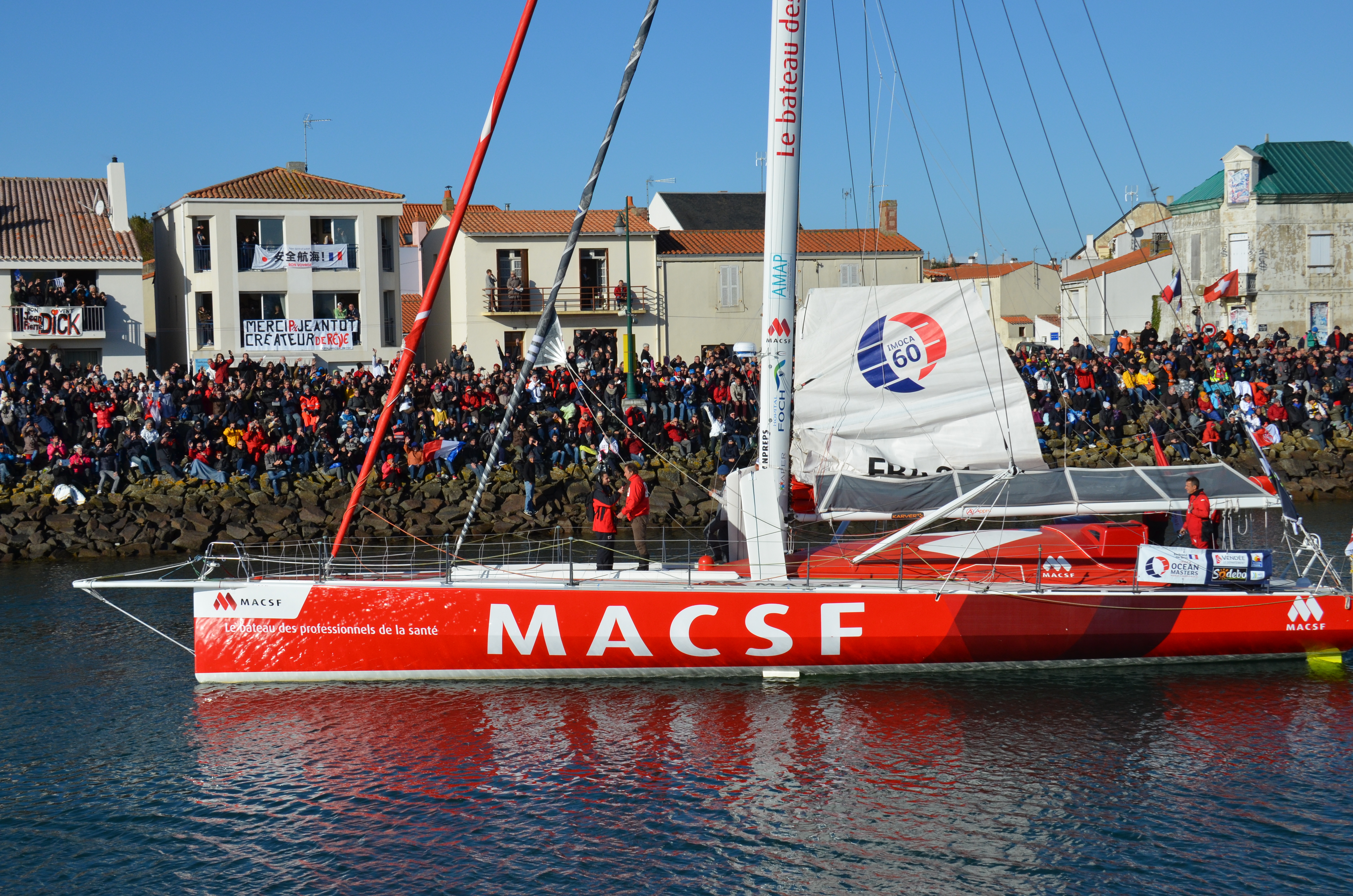
MACSF
Bertrand de Broc (FRA)
'

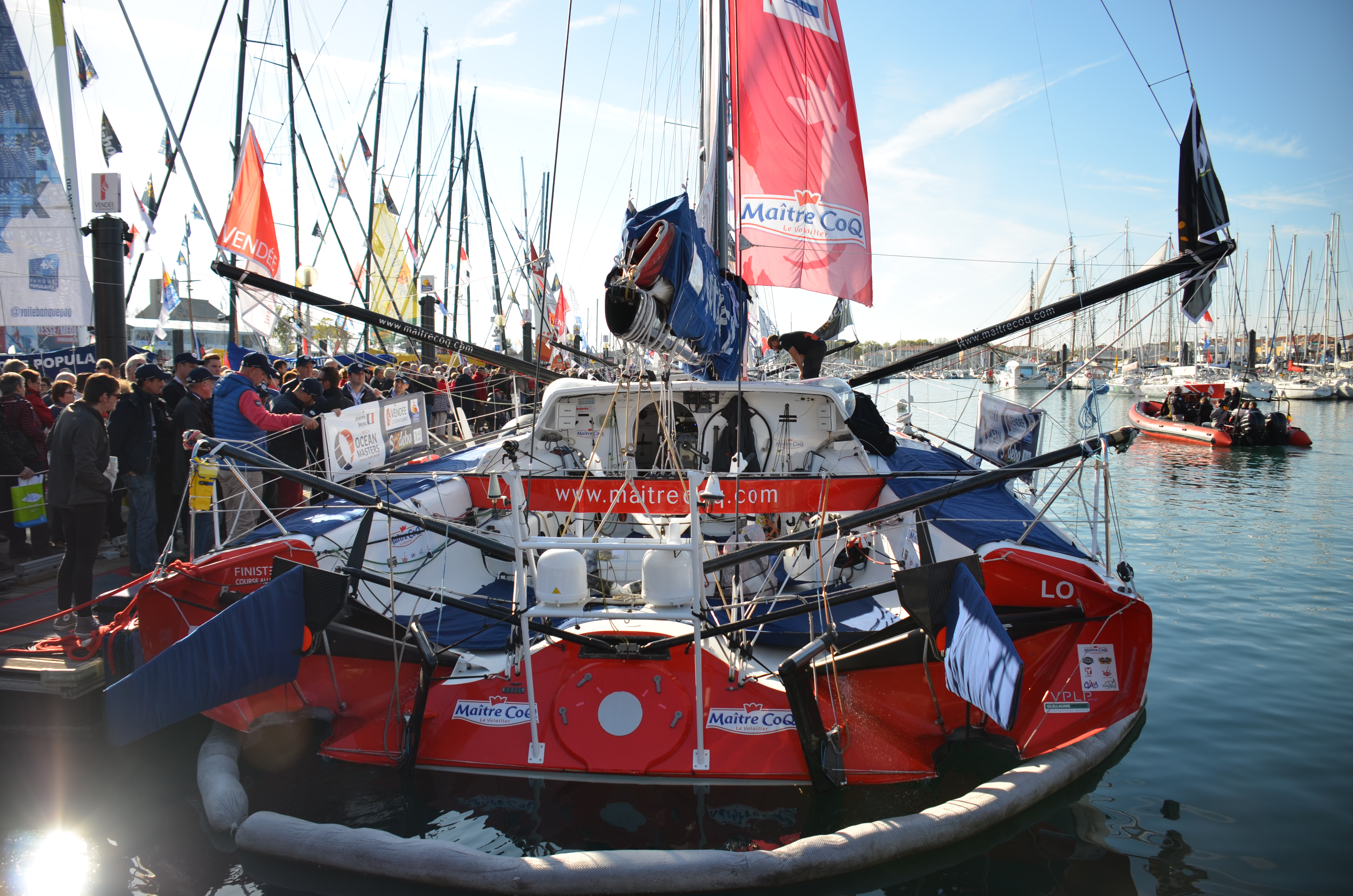
Maître Coq
Jérémie Beyou (FRA)

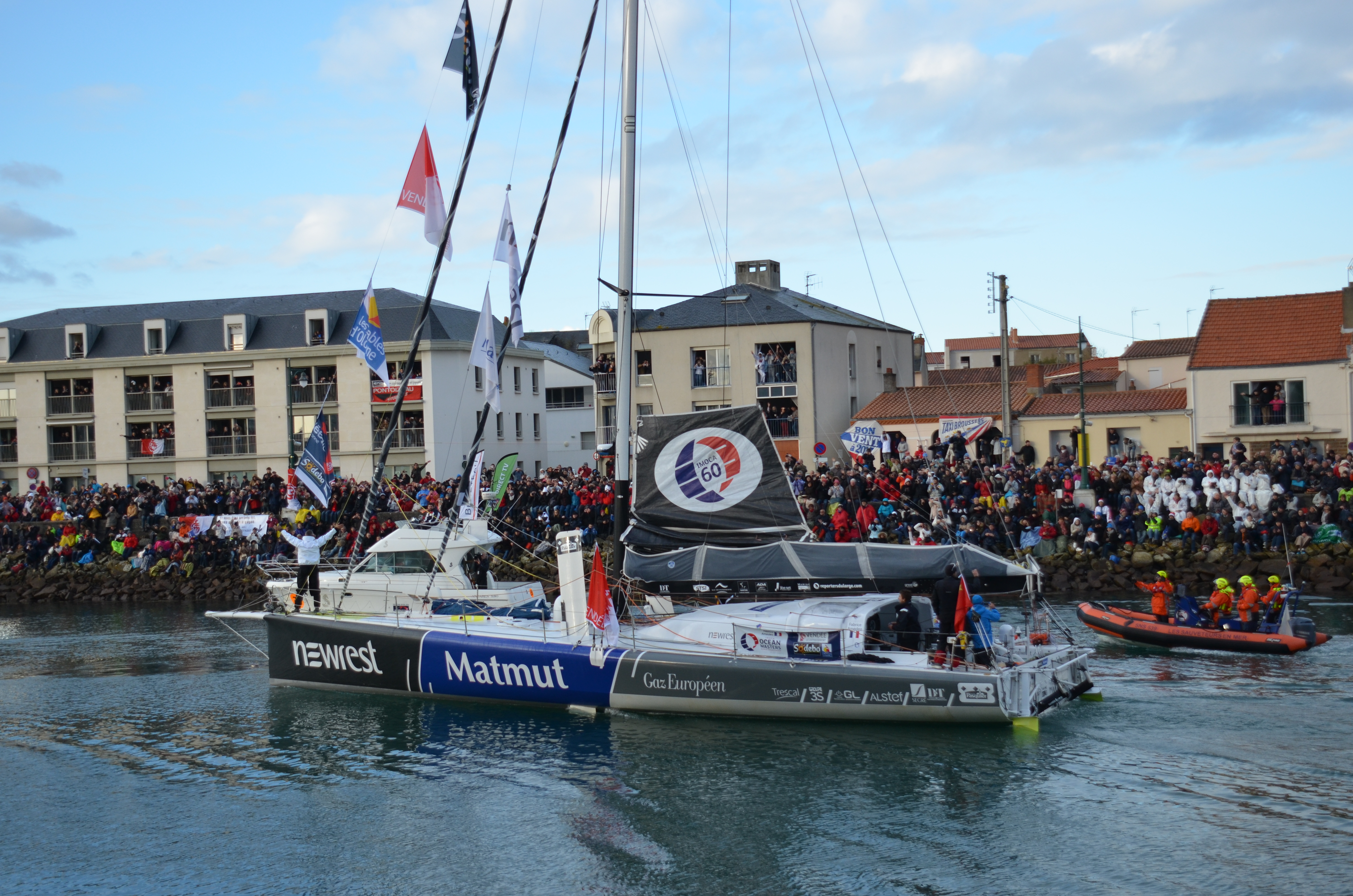
Newrest-Matmut
Fabrice Amedeo (FRA)

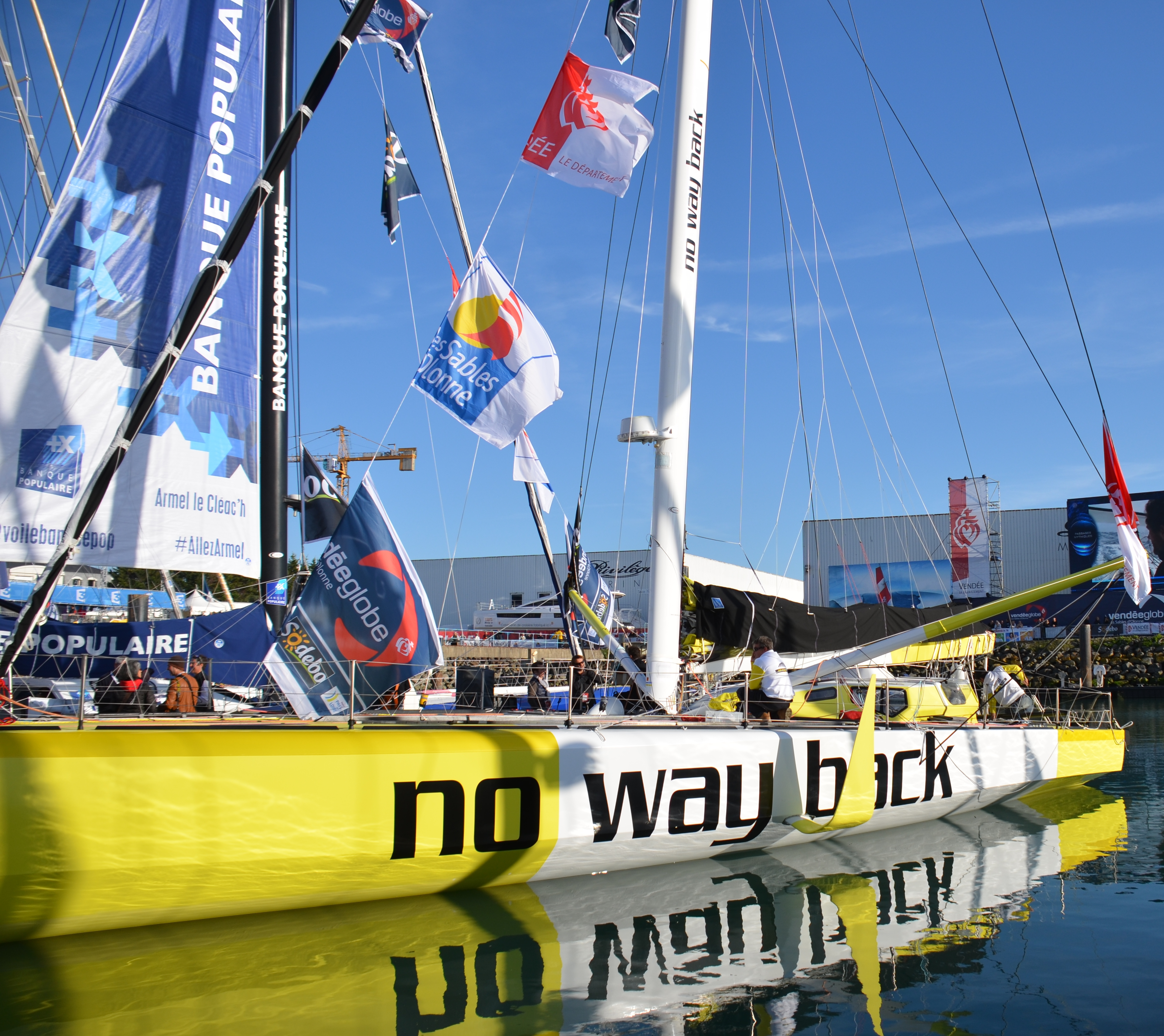
No Way Back
Pieter Heerema (NED)

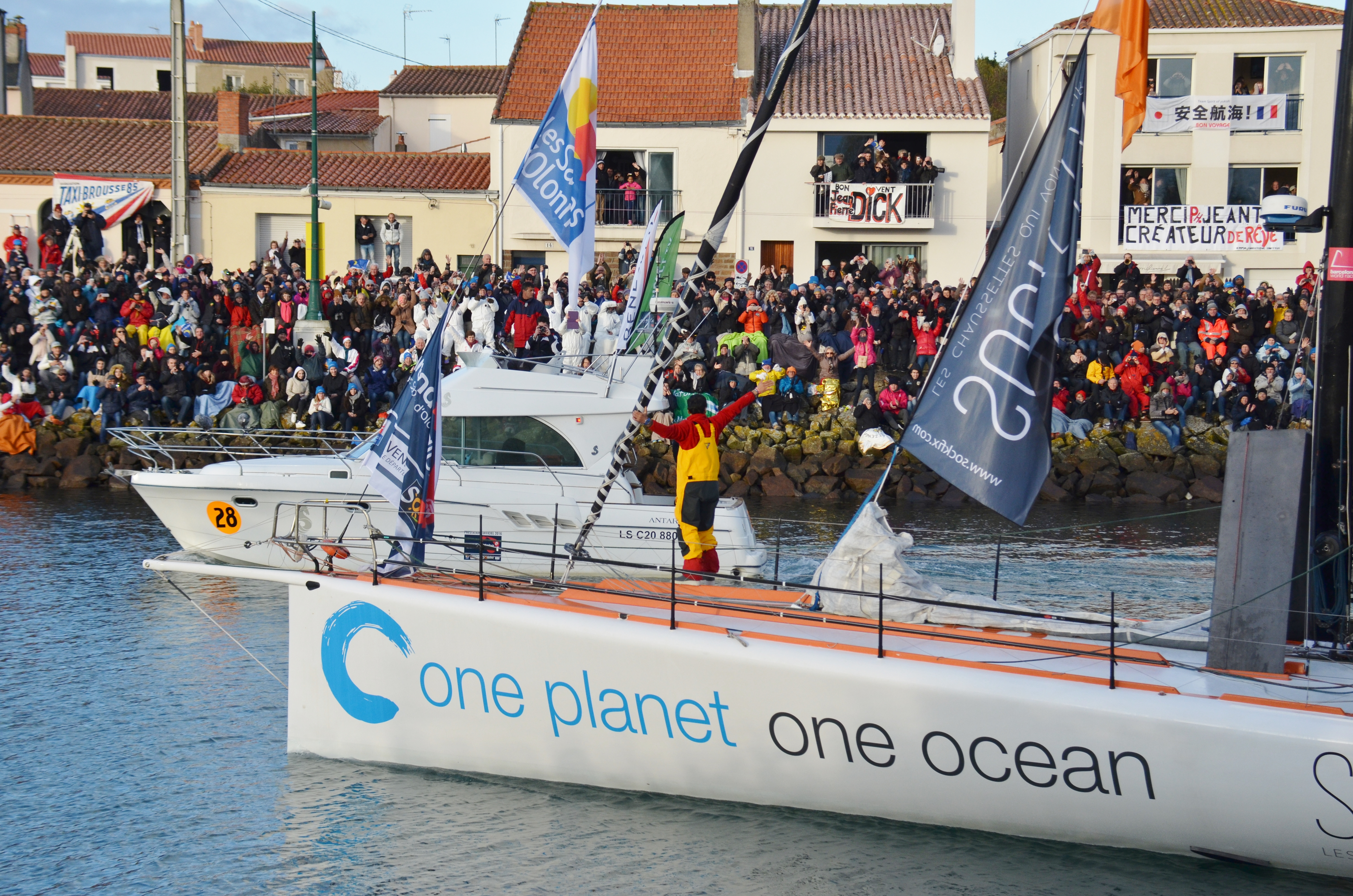
One planet One Ocean
Didac Costa (ESP)

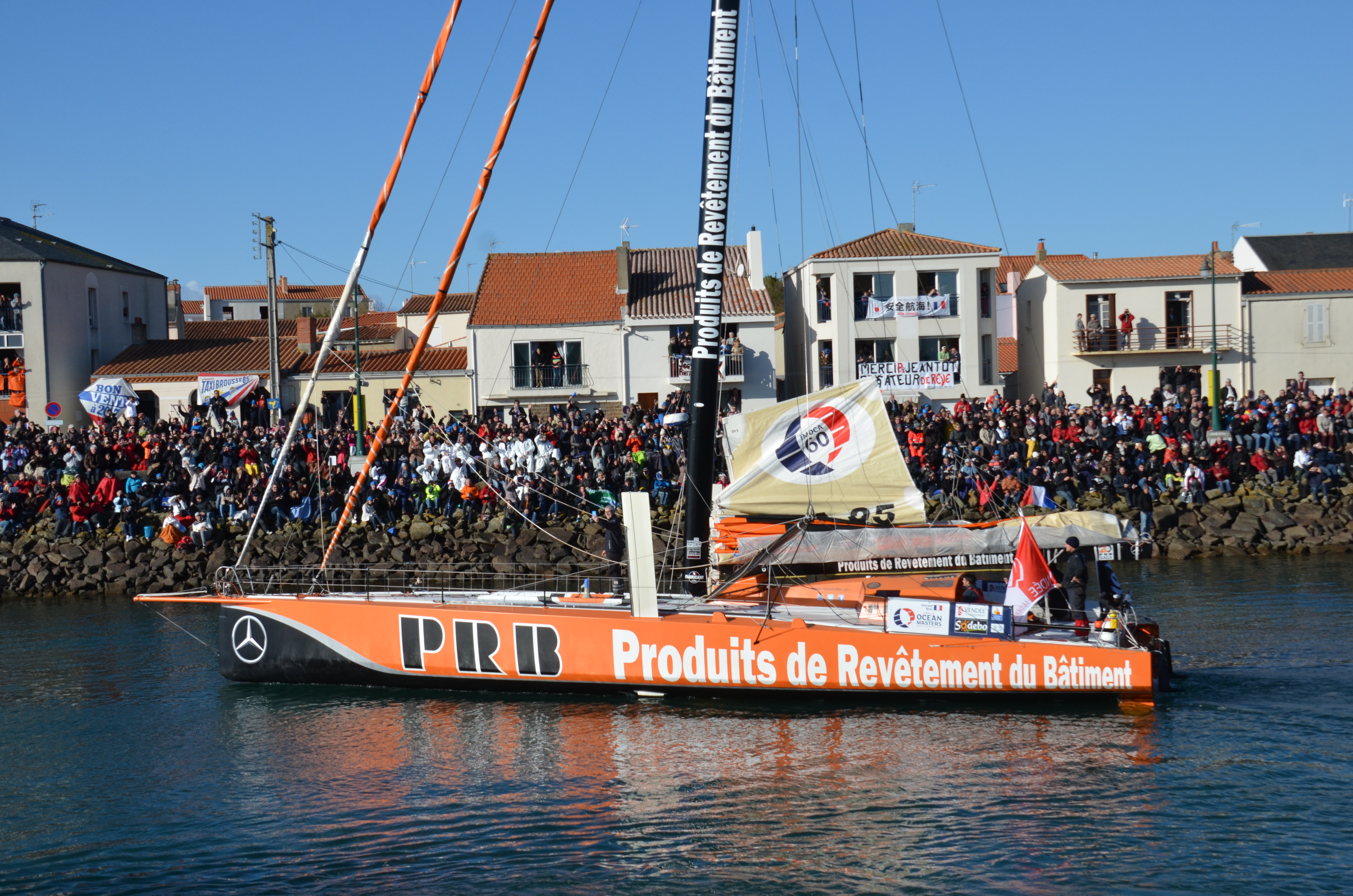
PRB 4
Vincent Riou (FRA)

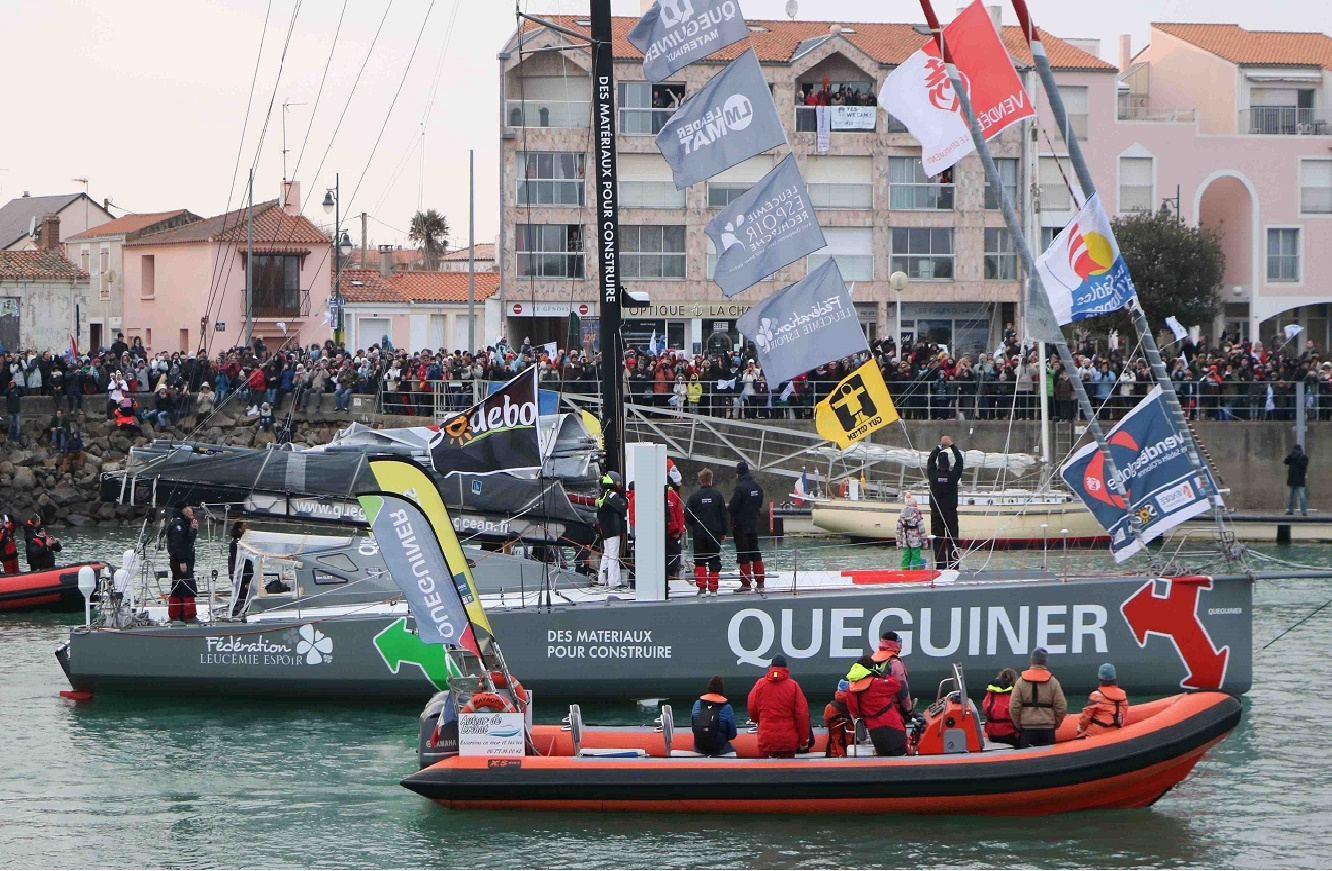
Quéguiner – Leucémie espoir
Yann Eliès (FRA)

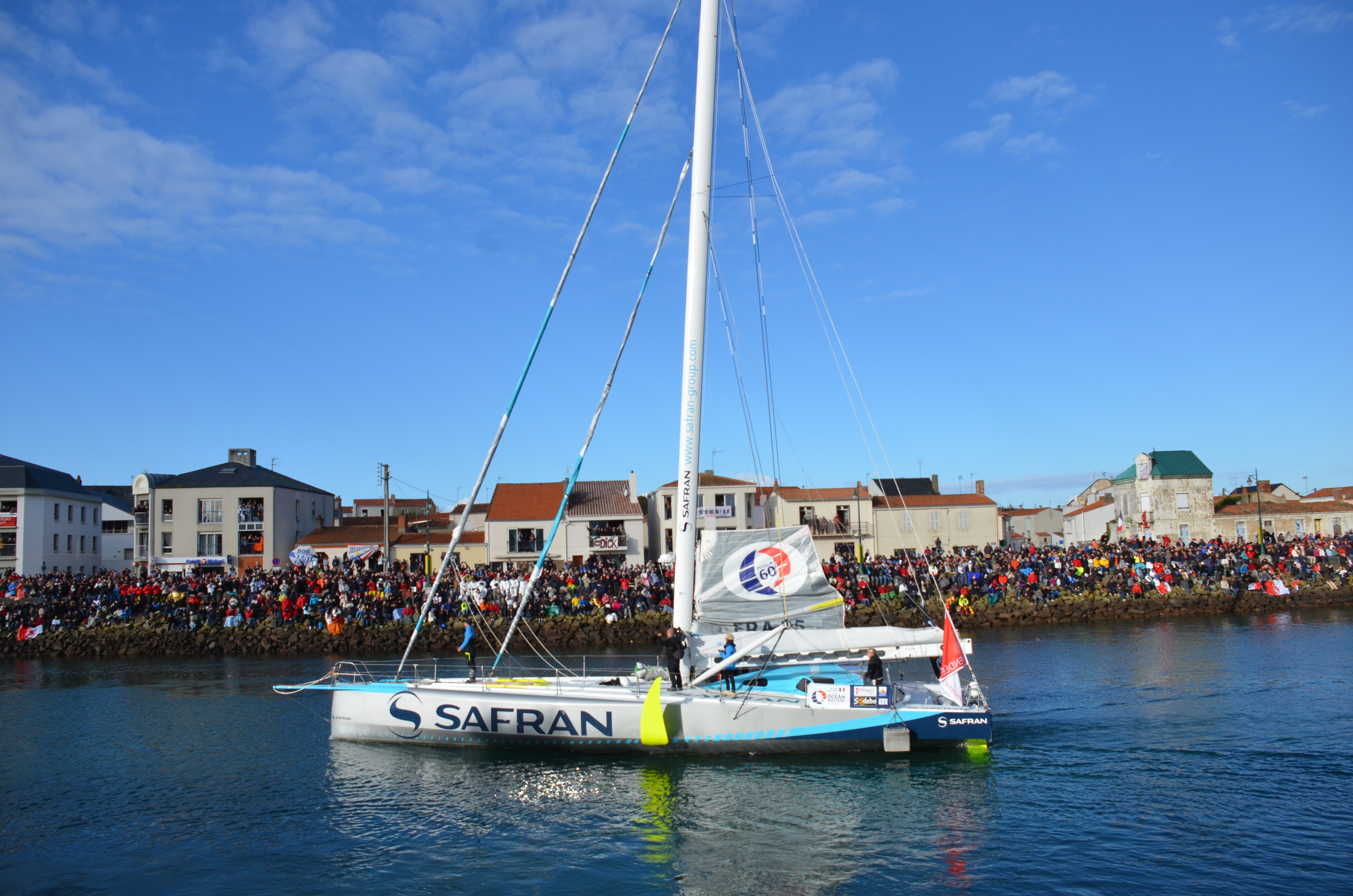
Safran III
Morgan Lagravière (FRA)

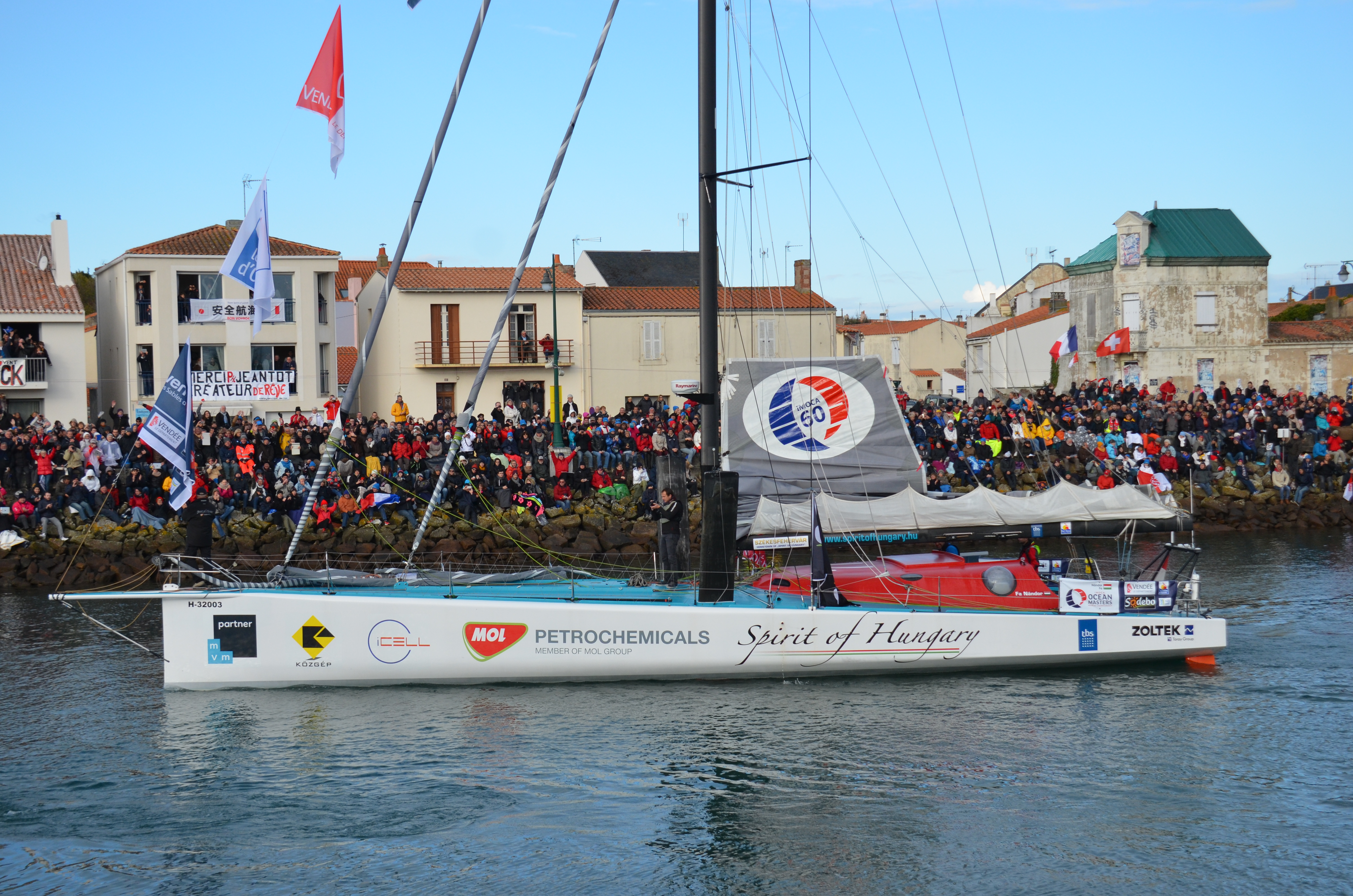
Spirit of Hungary
Nándor Fa (HUN)

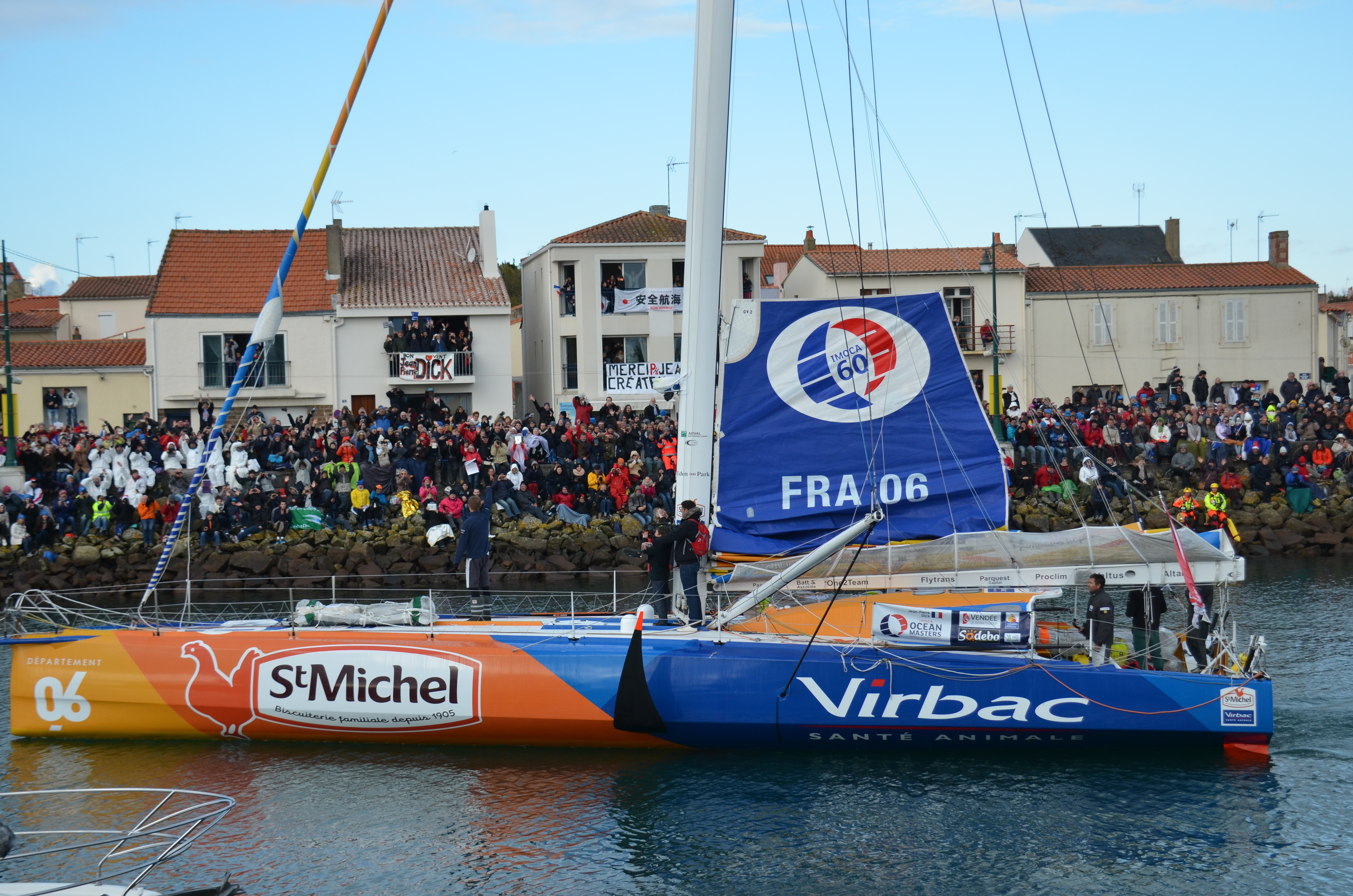
StMichel-Virbac
Jean-Pierre Dick (FRA)

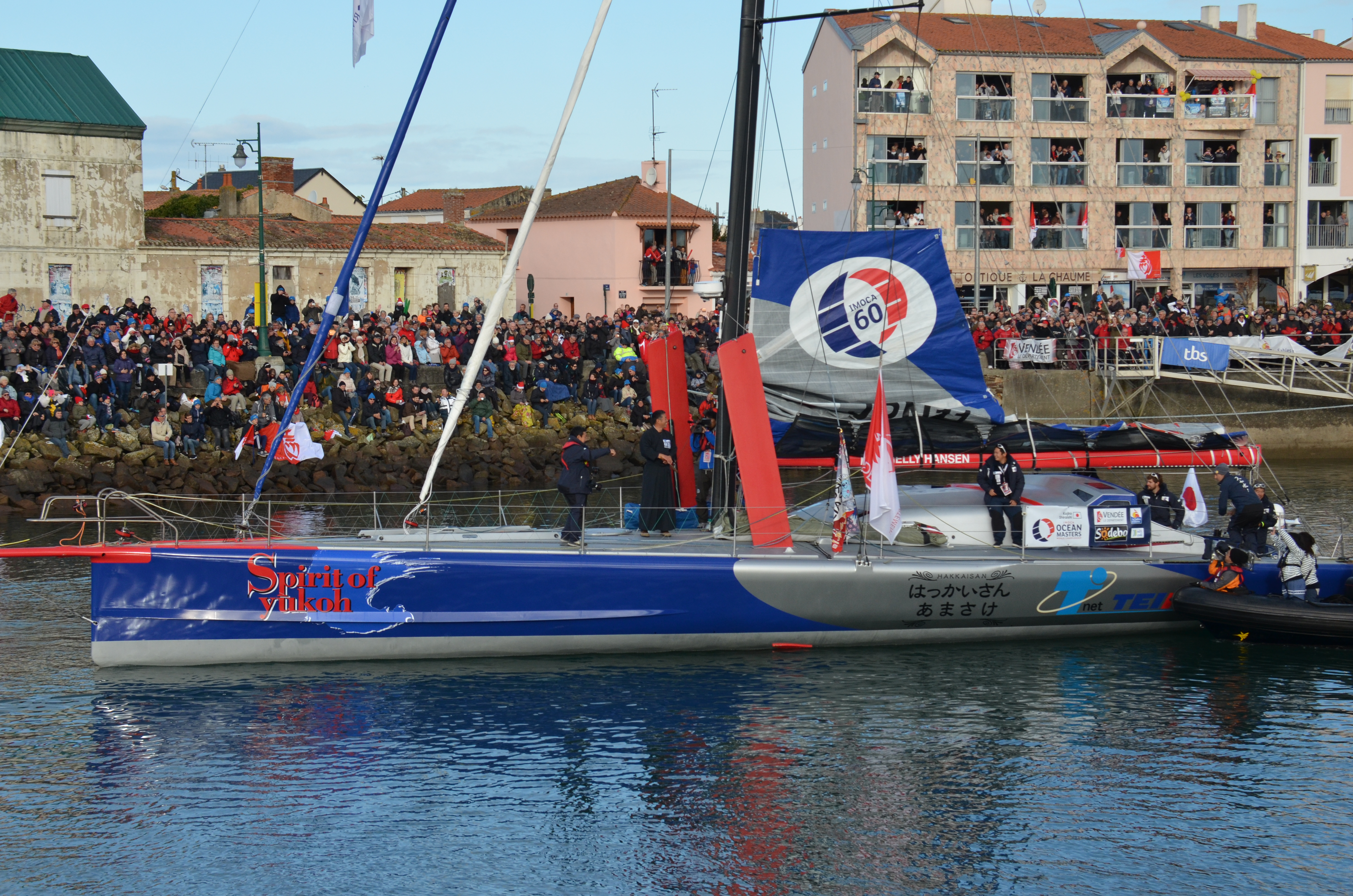
Spirit of Yukoh
Kojiro Shiraishi (JPN)

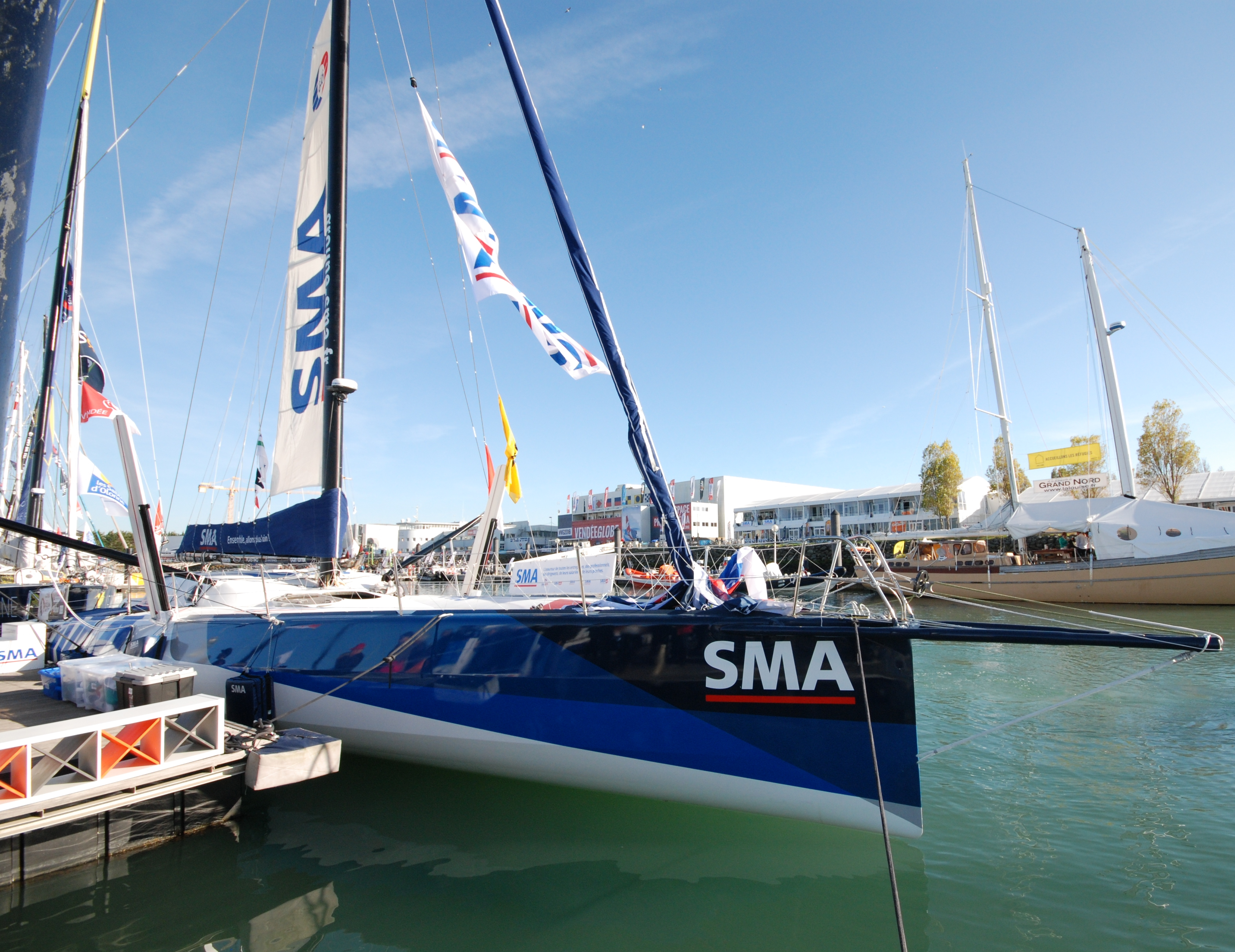
SMA
Paul Meilhat (FRA)

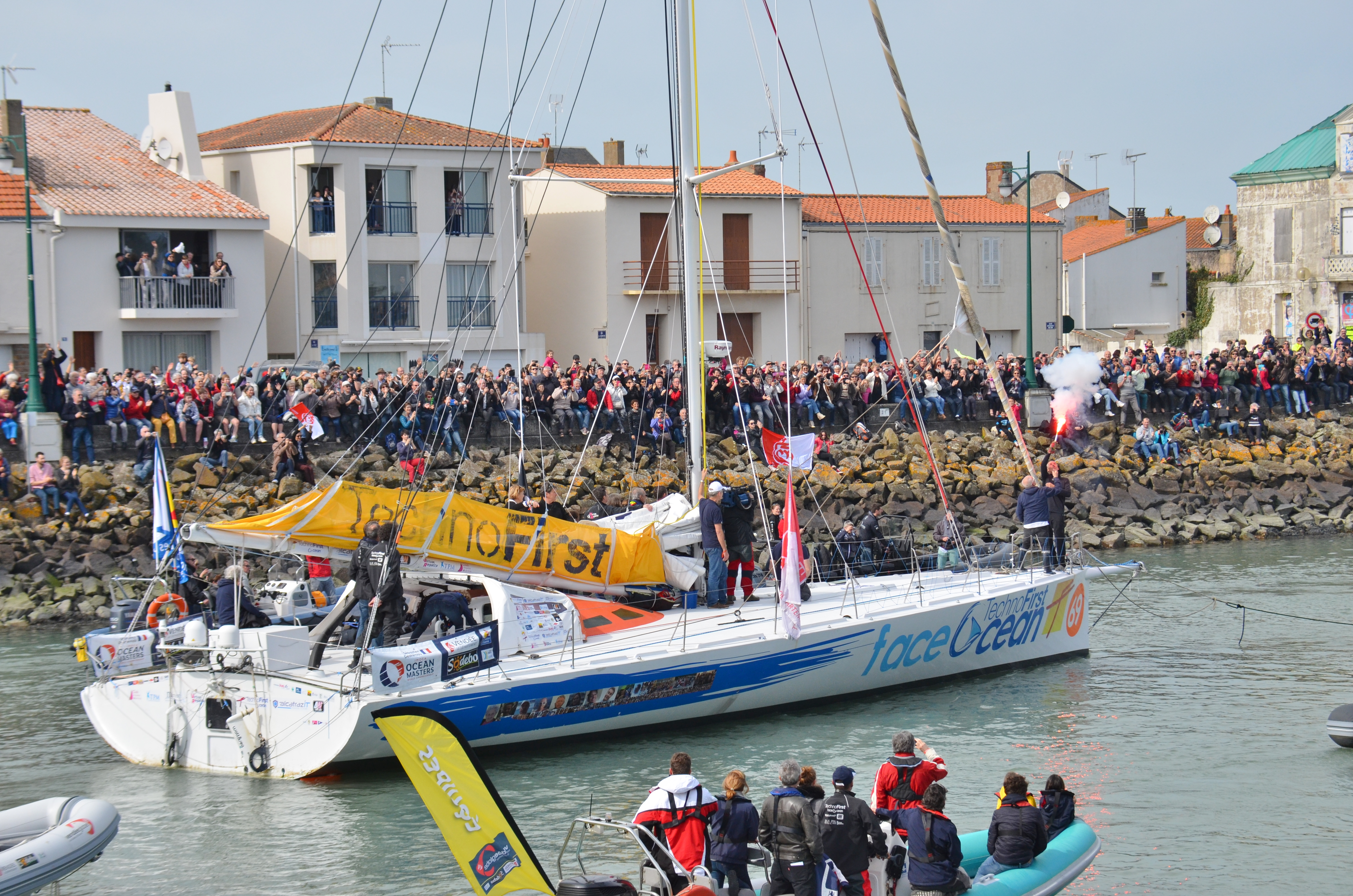
TechnoFirst-FaceOcean
Sébastien Destremau (FRA)

=== Sailors and boat details ===
List of participants and equipment used
Skipper	Prev. participation (Start/Finish)	Name of boat	Sail no.	Naval architect	Builder	Launch date	Ref.
Alex Thomson (GBR)	3 / 1 (3rd)	Hugo Boss	GBR 99	Verdier / VPLP	Green Marine	2015	
Armel Le Cléac'h (FRA)	2 / 2 (2nd)	Banque Populaire VIII	FRA 18	Verdier / VPLP	CDK Technologies	2015	
Arnaud Boissières (FRA)	2 / 2 (8th)	La Mie câline	FRA 14	Farr Yacht Design	Southern Ocean Marine	2007	
Alan Roura (SUI)	0 / 0	La Fabrique	SUI 07	Pierre Rolland	Globe Surfer-Lesconil / Bernard Stamm	2000	
Bertrand de Broc (FRA)	3 / 1 (9th)	MACSF	FRA 21	Finot-Conq	Multiplast	2007	
Conrad Colman (NZL) (USA)	0 / 0	Foresight Natural Energy	NZL 80	Artech Design Team	Artech do Brasil	2005	
Didac Costa (ESP)	0 / 0	One planet One ocean	ESP 33	Owen Clarke Design	Marten Yachts	2000	
Enda O'Coineen (IRL)	0 / 0	Kilcullen Voyager – Team Ireland	IRL 3	Owen Clarke Design	Hakes Marine	2007	
Éric Bellion (FRA)	0 / 0	Comme un seul homme	FRA 1000	Finot-Conq	Multiplast	2008	
Fabrice Amedeo (FRA)	0 / 0	Newrest-Matmut	FRA 56	Farr Yacht Design	Southern Ocean Marine	2007	
Romain Attanasio (FRA)	0 / 0	Famille Mary – Étamine du Lys	FRA 72	Marc Lombard	MAG France	1998	
Jérémie Beyou (FRA)	2 / 0	Maître Coq	FRA 19	Verdier / VPLP	CDK Technologies	2010	
Jean-Pierre Dick (FRA)	3 / 2 (4th)	StMichel-Virbac	FRA 06	Verdier / VPLP	Multiplast	2015	
Jean Le Cam (FRA)	3 / 2 (2nd)	Finistère Mer Vent	FRA 001	Farr Yacht Design	CDK Technologies	2007	
Louis Burton (FRA)	1 / 0	Bureau Vallée	FRA 35	Farr Yacht Design	JMV Industries	2006	
Kito de Pavant (FRA)	2 / 0	Bastide-Otio	FRA 30	Verdier / VPLP	Cookson Boats	2010	
Kojiro Shiraishi (JPN)	0 / 0	Spirit of Yukoh	JPN 11	Bruce Farr Yacht Design	Offshore Challenges Sailing Team	2007	
Morgan Lagravière (FRA)	0 / 0	Safran III	FRA 25	Verdier / VPLP	CDK Technologies	2015	
Nándor Fa (HUN)	1 / 1 (5th)	Spirit of Hungary	HUN 77	Nándor Fa / Attila Déry	Nándor Fa	2014	
Paul Meilhat (FRA)	0 / 0	SMA	FRA 1859	Verdier / VPLP	CDK Technologies	2010	
Pieter Heerema (NED)	0 / 0	No Way Back	NED 160	Verdier / VPLP	Persico Marine	2015	
Rich Wilson (USA)	1 / 1 (10th)	Great American IV	USA 37	Owen Clarke Design	Southern Ocean Marine	2006	
Sébastien Destremau (FRA)	0 / 0	TechnoFirst-FaceOcean	FRA 69	Finot-Conq	JMV Industries	1998	
Sébastien Josse (FRA)	3 / 1 (5th)	Gitana 16 – Edmond de Rothschild	FRA 16	Verdier / VPLP	Multiplast	2015	
Stéphane Le Diraison (FRA)	0 / 0	Compagnie du Lit-Boulogne Billancourt	FRA 92	Finot-Conq	Neville Hutton	2007	
Tanguy de Lamotte (FRA)	1 / 1 (10th)	Initiatives-Cœur (2)	FRA 109	Farr Yacht Design	CDK Technologies	2006	
Thomas Ruyant (FRA)	0 / 0	Le Souffle du Nord	FRA 121	Verdier / VPLP	Indiana Yachting	2007	
Vincent Riou (FRA)	3 / 1 (5th)	PRB 4	FRA 85	Verdier / VPLP	CDK Technologies	2010	
Yann Eliès (FRA)	2 / 1 (5th)	Quéguiner – Leucémie espoir	FRA 029	Verdier / VPLP	Eluère	2007	
