= It Won't Always Be Like This (Inhaler song) =

Single by Inhaler

from the album It Won't Always Be Like This
- Released: March 19, 2019 (original release); June 9, 2021 (re-release)
- Recorded: Narcissus Studio, London
- Genre: Indie rock
- Length: 4:04
- Label: Polydor
- Songwriters: Elijah Hewson; Josh Jenkinson; Robert Keating; Ryan McMahon
- Producer: Antony Genn

Inhaler singles chronology
| "My Honest Face" (2019) | "It Won't Always Be Like This" (2019) | "Ice Cream Sundae" (2019) |

Music video
- "It Won't Always Be Like This" on YouTube

"It Won't Always Be Like This" is a song recorded by Irish indie rock band Inhaler. It was written by the band and produced by Antony Genn, and was released as a standalone single on 19 March 2019 before being re-recorded and re-released on 9 June 2021 as the title track for their debut album.

== Background ==
Inhaler formed in 2012 when the members were attending St Andrew's College, Dublin, with the name being decided several years later in 2015. They began self-releasing music in 2017 and eventually signed with Polydor Records in 2019, where they started to work on their debut album. It Won't Always Be Like This was set to be recorded in early 2020, but had to be postponed due to the COVID-19 pandemic. The album was officially announced on 18 March 2021 alongside the reveal of the track list, with "It Won't Always Be Like This" featuring as the first song and title track.

== Writing and composition ==
"It Won't Always Be Like This" was the first song the band wrote, with frontman Elijah Hewson expressing that "it’s a teenage song about a girl I liked, but when the pandemic struck it took on this whole different life. The world is on fire, but here’s some hope for the future." Echoing this, drummer Ryan McMahon noted that the fan's interpretation of the song has varied between when it was originally written in 2016 and when it was re-released in 2021 stating, "that was the first song we wrote together. What’s been interesting is how the title is being interpreted by different people. We can see in comment sections that there’s people going, ‘Yes! It won’t always be like this. They’re dead right.’ And then other people are like, ‘It won’t always be like this? Yeah, it could get a lot worse, lads.’ It's doing what songs should do—have a different meaning for a different person, depending on whatever point they're at in their life." Further discussing the writing of the song, Hewson explained that, "I still have on the old computer, on GarageBand, a little of that riff in there from 2016. I remember playing it in the room together for the first time and the drums being a hook. That was like, ‘Oh man, that’s catchy.’ The first time we wrote something catchy."

Of selecting the song as the title track for the album, Hewson expressed, "there’s a sense of optimism on this album and the song “It Won’t Always Be Like This” is the main catalyst for that. We kept coming back to that title." He stated that, at the time, the song was the opening track in their live sets and that this influenced their decision for it to be the first song on the album. It was re-recorded for the album, with Hewson adding that the band wanted to give the song "a bit of a facelift and make it sound like it does now live", as well as "update it and make it sound like the rest of the record".

== Music video ==
The official video for "It Won't Always Be Like This" was released on 9 June 2021 and was directed by James Slater.

== Charts ==
Chart performance for "It Won't Always Be Like This"
| Chart (2019) | Peak position |
|---|---|
| UK Physical Singles (Official Charts Company) | 9 |
| UK Singles Sales (Official Charts Company) | 77 |
| UK Vinyl Singles (Official Charts Company) | 8 |
