= Cheer Up Baby =

"Cheery Up Baby"

Single by Inhaler

from the album It Won't Always Be Like This
- Released: March 17, 2021
- Recorded: Narcissus Studio, London
- Genre: Pop rock
- Length: 3:53
- Label: Polydor
- Songwriters: Elijah Hewson; Josh Jenkinson; Robert Keating; Ryan McMahon
- Producer: Antony Genn

Inhaler singles chronology
"When It Breaks" (2020)	"Cheery Up Baby" (2021)	"My Honest Face" (2021)

Music video
- "Cheer Up Baby" on YouTube

"Cheer Up Baby" is a song recorded by Irish indie rock band Inhaler. It was written by the band and produced by Antony Genn, and was released on 17 March 2021 as the second single from their debut studio album It Won't Always Be Like This.

== Background ==
Inhaler formed in 2012 when the members were attending St Andrew's College, Dublin, with the name being decided several years later in 2015. They began self-releasing music in 2017 and eventually signed with Polydor Records in 2019, where they started to work on their debut album. It Won't Always Be Like This was set to be recorded in early 2020, but had to be postponed due to the COVID-19 pandemic. The album was officially announced on 18 March 2021 alongside the release of "Cheer Up Baby", which features as the fourth song on the tracklist. The band had teased the track a week prior to its release by posting a sped-up image of a billboard announcing the song.

The band performed the song on The Late Late Show with James Corden on 13 July 2021.

== Writing and composition ==
"Cheer Up Baby" is an "classic, feel-good, anthemic" pop rock song. It was originally written and recorded in 2017, and quickly became a fan favourite part of Inhaler's early live shows, with drummer Ryan McMahon stating, "I remember the first time we played ‘Cheer Up Baby,’ it was St. Patrick’s Day, 2017. We weren’t very tight as a band but the song was there and people were really relating to it. We knew there was something good in it." Frontman Elijah Hewson called it as "a great pop song" that "really takes us back to our roots as a band" and that the audience would really respond to the song when they performed it, which likely influenced their decision to include it on their debut album.

Discussing the song, the band described "Cheer Up Baby" as a track that "captures the essence of their sound" and was recorded when the members were still teenagers that they had established as a live favourite during their concerts. They felt the track had taken on a new meaning in light of the impact of the COVID-19 pandemic on mental health. Regarding the song's content, Hewson explained, "lyrically, a lot of young people in these times are dealing with mental health issues and they can get stuck in their own heads. I think that’s what this song is, it’s loosely based on a conversation between two people and a lyric that goes ‘when I think of all the things I didn’t do, I can’t help but blame it on you”. It’s about getting over yourself and if you’ve ever had a friend dealing with that kind of stuff, sometimes it’s as easy as reaching out your hand and talking. I think that’s what it means to us, cheer up baby. It’s a love letter to all our fans who are feeling isolated."

== Music video ==
The official music video for "Cheer Up Baby" was released on 17 March 2021, and was directed by Joe Connor, known for his work on videos by Biffy Clyro, Coldplay, and The Rolling Stones. It features the band performing the song in an all white room as they gradually cover it, themselves, and the lens of the camera in different coloured paint. At the end of the video, Hewson spray paints the title of the song onto the camera.

== Charts ==
Chart performance for "Cheer Up Baby"
Chart (2021-22)	Peak position
Belgium (Ultratop 50 Flanders)	13
US Adult Alternative Airplay (Billboard)	14
US Alternative Airplay (Billboard)	33

== Release history ==
Release dates and formats for "Cheer Up Baby"
Region	Date	Format(s)	Label(s)	Ref.
United States	November 16, 2021	Alternative radio	Interscope	
United States	November 22, 2021	Adult alternative radio	Interscope	
