= When It Breaks =

Single by Inhaler

from the album It Won't Always Be Like This
- Released: October 15, 2020
- Recorded: Narcissus Studio, London
- Genre: Indie rock
- Length: 3:42
- Label: Polydor
- Songwriters: Antony Genn; Elijah Hewson; Josh Jenkinson; Robert Keating; Ryan McMahon
- Producer: Antony Genn

Inhaler singles chronology
"Falling In" (2020)	"When It Breaks" (2020)	"Cheer Up Baby" (2021)

Music video
- "When It Breaks" on YouTube

"When It Breaks" is a song recorded by Irish indie rock band Inhaler. It was written by the band alongside Antony Genn, who also produced the track, and was released on 15 October 2020 as the lead single from their debut studio album It Won't Always Be Like This.

== Background ==
Inhaler formed in 2012 when the members were attending St Andrew's College, Dublin, with the name being decided several years later in 2015. They began self-releasing music in 2017 and eventually signed with Polydor Records in 2019, where they started to work on their debut album. It Won't Always Be Like This was set to be recorded in early 2020, but had to be postponed due to the COVID-19 pandemic. The album was officially announced on 18 March 2021 alongside the reveal of the track list, with "When It Breaks" featuring as the seventh song.

== Writing and composition ==
"When It Breaks" was written and recorded in 2020 during the coronavirus-enforced lockdown and began with an instrumental demo which the band felt was "dark but also pretty hopeful sounding" and that, when they were finally able to return to the studio, they were motivated to write a song that reflected what they had gone through during the pandemic and how it had affected them. Discussing the lyrics, the band explained, "coming off tour into lockdown was a huge adjustment for us after we had just got used to life on tour. At first, it was a welcome break but pretty soon we were dying to get back to any festival or any gig where we could get our fix! The lyrics and the music communicate the anxiousness of how we were all feeling and still are now a couple months later." They also described it as "the most politically driven song we’ve released so far" and expressed that the track is "our interpretation of this strange and imperfect world we’ve come to live in. Things are gonna change and we are gonna be there when they do."

== Music video ==
The official video for "When It Breaks" was released on 28 October 2020. It was directed by Douglas Hart and features the band all wearing pink shirts and performing the song in an all white room as they are lit with various "kaleidoscopic" effects.

== Charts ==
Chart performance for "When It Breaks"
Chart (2020)	Peak position
Belgium (Ultratop 50 Flanders)	33
