= My Honest Face =

Single by Inhaler

from the album It Won't Always Be Like This
- Released: October 15, 2021 (re-release); May 17, 2019 (original release)
- Recorded: Narcissus Studio, London
- Genre: Indie rock
- Length: 4:32
- Label: Polydor
- Songwriters: Elijah Hewson; Josh Jenkinson; Robert Keating; Ryan McMahon
- Producer: Antony Genn

Inhaler singles chronology
"Cheer Up Baby" (2021)	"My Honest Face" (2021)	"These Are the Days" (2022)

Music video
- "My Honest Face" on YouTube

"My Honest Face" is a song recorded by Irish indie rock band Inhaler. It was written by the band and produced by Antony Genn, and was originally released on 17 May 2019 before being re-released on 15 October 2021 as the third single from their debut studio album It Won't Always Be Like This.

== Background ==
Inhaler formed in 2012 when the members were attending St Andrew's College, Dublin, with the name being decided several years later in 2015. They began self-releasing music in 2017 and eventually signed with Polydor Records in 2019, where they started to work on their debut album. It Won't Always Be Like This was set to be recorded in early 2020, but had to be postponed due to the COVID-19 pandemic. The album was officially announced on 18 March 2021 alongside the reveal of the track list, with "My Honest Face" featuring as the second song.

== Writing and composition ==
"My Honest Face" is a song that describes feelings of anxiety associated with trying to establish your identity during adolescence. Of the track, frontman Elijah Hewson stated, "when we first put [the] song out, first wrote it, we were just starting to be on stage and I don’t think any of us were really comfortable with being on it, and we were trying to figure out what kind of people we wanted to be. It wasn’t even really about being on stage, it was just, like, growing up, and that kind of angle on it. I think everybody has to figure out or at least think about what kind of person they want to be in this world and if you do have a voice, what do you want to say? And we still haven’t figured that out yet and that song is still a testament to that. I think one of the fun things about being in Inhaler is that we still haven’t found our sound."

== Music video ==
The official video for "My Honest Face" was released on 8 July 2019 featuring different clips of the band playing the song live that were recorded by Anaïs Gallagher, Sam Hannigan and Glenn Hanstock.

A new video was released on 2 October 2021 and was made up of footage from the band's main stage performances at the 2021 Reading and Leeds Festival, and from their headlining It Won't Always Be Like This tour.

== Charts ==
Chart performance for "My Honest Face"
Chart (2019)	Peak position
Belgium (Ultratop 50 Flanders)	24
UK Physical Singles (Official Charts Company)	4
UK Singles Sales (Official Charts Company)	49
UK Vinyl Singles (Official Charts Company)	2
