= Noreena Hertz =

British economist (born 1967)

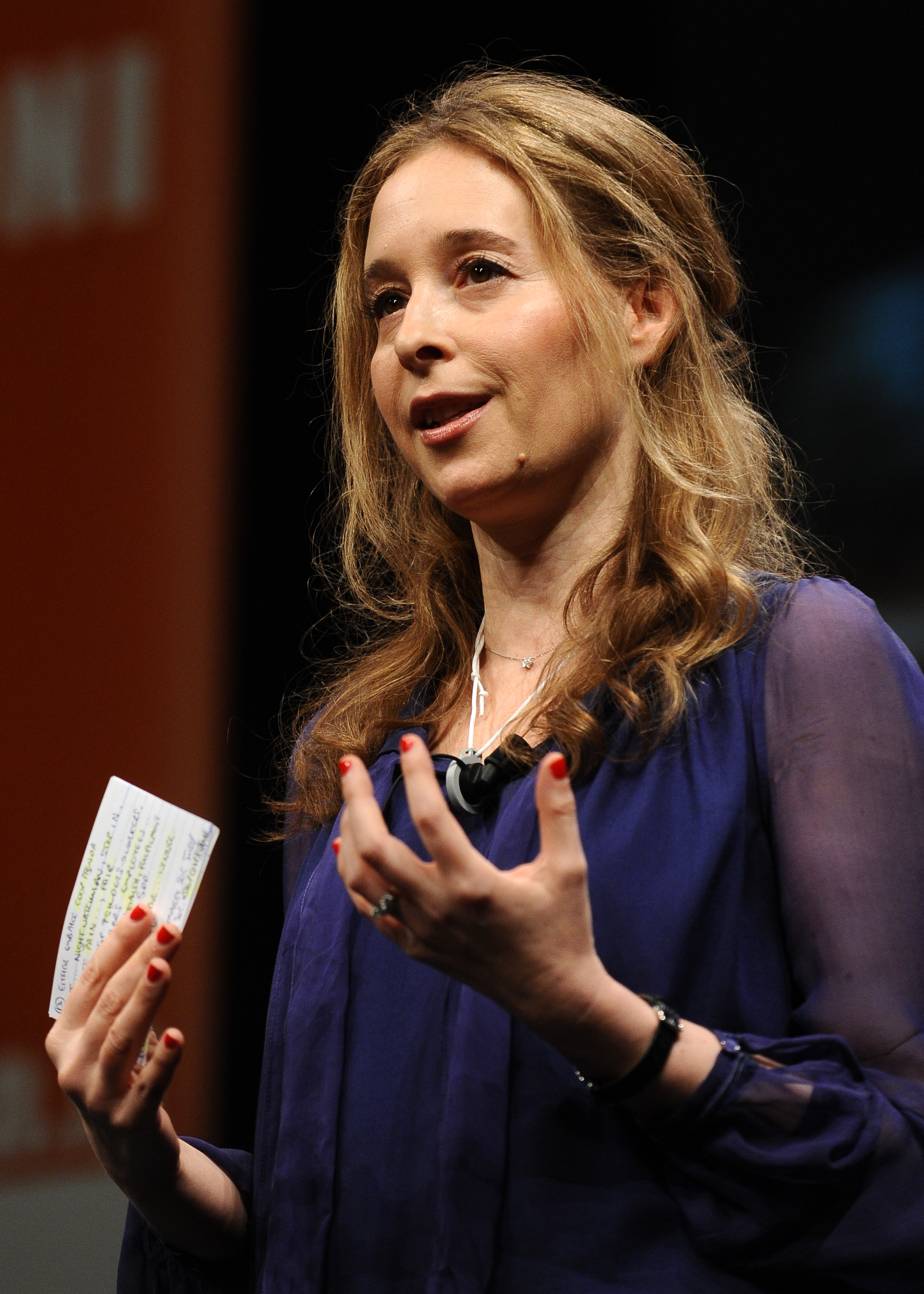
- Hertz in 2012
- Born: 24 September 1967 (age 58); East Finchley, London, England
- Education: North London Collegiate School; Westminster School; University College London; The Wharton School (MBA); King's College, Cambridge (PhD)
- Occupations: Academic, economist, author, broadcaster
- Employer: ITV News
- Spouse: Danny Cohen (m. 2012)
- Relatives: Joseph Hertz (great-grandfather)

Noreena Hertz (born 24 September 1967) is an English academic, economist and bestselling author, who sits on the boards of Mattel, Warner Music Group and Workhuman. She has been Honorary Professor at University College London since 2014 and is based at The UCL Policy Lab.

In 2001, The Guardian dubbed her "one of the world's leading young thinkers" In September 2013, Hertz was featured on the cover of Newsweek magazine. Fast Company magazine has named her "one of the most influential economists on the international stage" and observed: "For more than two decades [her] economic predictions have been accurate and ahead of the curve."

She describes herself as "a campaigning academic". British media has nicknamed her the "Nigella Lawson of economics".

== Early life ==
Hertz is a great-granddaughter of British Chief Rabbi Joseph H. Hertz, and was born and brought up in East Finchley, London. When she was 20 years old, her mother, the fashion designer and feminist activist Leah Hertz, died of cancer. Hertz was a precocious child and began her schooling aged just three years, taking her A-levels at the age of 16. She first attended North London Collegiate School, followed by Westminster School.

== Academic career ==
Hertz graduated from University College London in philosophy and economics at the age of 18. She then attended The Wharton School, Philadelphia, where she majored in finance and earned her MBA degree at the age of 23. Hertz then worked for a short period at Triad Artists, a talent agency in Los Angeles, California, where she originally planned to break into the film industry as a producer. Following her stint in the creative industries, Hertz took up a position as a consultant to the World Bank Group working for the International Finance Corporation (IFC) in Saint Petersburg, Russia.

Disillusioned by what she perceived as failings in the World Bank's approach to post-Soviet reforms, she quit her post and worked briefly for the European Bank for Reconstruction and Development (EBRD). Of the International Finance Corporation (IFC), she said: "Early on I raised the issue of social safety nets and was quite shocked to see how clearly my concerns were dismissed." Having returned to the UK she studied for a PhD degree in economics and business at King's College, Cambridge. Her Cambridge doctoral thesis, Russian Business Relationships in the Wake of Reform, was published in 1997 by St. Martin's Press.

In 2009, Hertz was appointed Professor and chair of Globalisation, Sustainability and Finance at the Duisenberg School of Finance, Amsterdam and Erasmus University, Rotterdam. She is a fellow of the University of Cambridge's Judge Business School. She is Honorary Professor at the UCL Policy Lab University College London.

== Published books ==
=== The Silent Takeover (2001) ===
In The Silent Takeover: Global Capitalism and the Death of Democracy Hertz warned that unregulated markets, corporate greed, and over-powerful financial institutions would have serious global consequences that would impact most heavily on the ordinary citizen. Hertz received a record six-figure advance from Random House for the book which, in pre-publicity, she promised would "make economics sexy." Although the book became a bestseller, it was not well-received when first published.

Francis Beckett, for The Independent, later observed that the book "was lavishly praised and savagely attacked in equal measure" but had nevertheless "launched her as a new sort of thinker - the first prominent British radical left winger to come out of the business schools." Howard Davies, reviewing it for The Guardian, dismissed it as "globaloney", written in "a style beloved of airport-newsstand business books: random statistic piled on borrowed anecdote, larded with a bit of homespun cod philosophy, shaken not stirred." Tariq Ali, for The Independent, called the book "well-intentioned" but "a much milder version [of] three more vigorous North American texts that have already achieved cult status", referring to Naomi Klein's No Logo, Thomas Frank's One Market Under God and Kalle Lasn's Culture Jam. Ali categorised Hertz's book as neoliberal and dismissed the Hertz's positions as third Way anti-capitalism. Ali concluded: "What Hertz really wants is a government that can unite business interests with those of ordinary people - like expecting homoeopathic drops to cure a cancer." Jennifer Szalai, for the New Statesman, wrote that the book was "at best, an anaemic objection to global capitalism" and pointed out: "For anybody who has read anything about corporations beyond their annual reports... the examples in this book are nothing new." Szalai described Hertz's "line of argument" as "a listless string of tired phrases, exposing her apparent ambivalence on the subject".

Will Self described the book as "superficially readable" but was critical of Hertz's ideology, calling it "an aggressive questioning of the pernicious status quo, but with only a febrile grasp on any potential solution - what used to be expected of a precocious adolescent, rather than a Cambridge assistant professor entering her mid-thirties." Frank Fitzgibbon, for The Sunday Times, described the book as "well-written, colourful and sometimes entertaining" but ultimately "one long whinge, full of hackneyed observations... like a 212-page Guardian editorial on the venality of politicians, the evils of big business and the right-on credentials of concerned citizens." Responding to the book's advance publicity, which claimed that Hertz would in The Silent Takeover provide "a new and startling take on the way we live now", Fitzgibbon observed: "With the possible exception of a quote from Bhutan's king, Jigme Singye Wangchuck - "gross national happiness is more important than gross national product" - there is nothing in this book that is not already known to anybody with a passing interest in business and current affairs. It has all been said before but, to her credit, Hertz says it with style and with her telegenic looks she should be in demand on the chat-show circuit."

=== IOU: The Debt Threat (2004) ===
The 2004 book IOU: The Debt Threat and Why We Must Defuse It comprised a study of debt in developing countries and provided Hertz's blueprint for economic development. Paul Kingsnorth, reviewing for the New Statesman, wrote: "Noreena is the Joanne Harris of political writing - and IOU, like its author, is all style and no substance." Kingsnorth said that her explanation of the debt issue was: "All fine, but also largely redundant, because this stuff has been circulating for years, and Hertz adds nothing new to the mix." He also found sections of the book "misleading" and noted that "her old employer the World Bank emerges with a curiously positive report card from a book about a problem it created almost single-handedly. The bank's former chief economist Larry Summers is represented as a passionate champion of the poor. Perhaps Hertz is not aware of the infamous internal memo that was leaked from the bank, in which this angelic man wrote: I think the economic logic behind dumping a load of toxic waste in the lowest-wage country is impeccable and we should face up to that... I've always thought that underpopulated countries in Africa are vastly underpolluted..." He dismissed the book as simply "going through the motions" and "remarkably bad writing."

Richard Adams, for The Guardian, wrote: "There is nothing here that will surprise readers of Susan George's 1988 book A Fate Worse than Debt, which remains the most forceful call for undoing the burden of the developing world." Hertz's proposed solutions were, he wrote, not well defined. "Some of her suggestions are patronising - setting up panels of international "overseers" for aid funding is a bit rich given her diatribes against external IMF and World Bank meddling - while one is downright dangerous: that wealthy nations hypothecate the taxes paid by immigrant workers for use as overseas aid (so removing their last shield against the xenophobe or racist, that they too pay taxes for the NHS)." Adams also found the book "littered with errors... that smack of economic illiteracy and careless research." Of her style, he observed: "Readers may also be unimpressed with Hertz's informal prose style and strangled syntax... The first chapter, especially, reads like a rejected screenplay for an unhappy episode of The West Wing." Adams concluded his review by writing: "While no one can doubt Hertz's good intentions, the road to hell is paved with books like IOU. Developing-world debt is a serious issue, and it deserves more judicious treatment than this."

Diane Coyle, writing for The Independent, called IOU "another pamphlet disguised as a book" and opined that "It pretends to weigh up the details and evidence, but its tone implies that anyone who disagrees is stupid or bad... HIV/Aids, the loss of Amazon rainforests and terrorism [are not] caused by these debts, which is the facile claim Hertz makes." Hannah Betts, for The Times, labelled the book "more than liberal breast-beating - it endeavours to be a psychology of debt... Without ever falling into the pat illiberalisms that the West brought 9/11 and its aftermath on itself, Hertz discusses the ways in which terrorism, disease and ecological meltdown may be the consequences of Third World stagnation." Desmond Tutu credited the book with a "remarkable clarity" and said it "puts forward clear recommendations that can and must be taken." Writing for the New Statesman he declared: "IOU should not go unnoticed. When the truth is told about international debt, then we can begin to overcome the scandalous debt slavery of the world's poor."

=== Eyes Wide Open: How to Make Smart Decisions in a Confusing World (2013) ===
In the 2013 book Eyes Wide Open: How to Make Smart Decisions in a Confusing World Hertz takes issue with the rise of unchecked data, and suggests simple solutions to allow her readers to take control of their lives." The book has received praise from prominent social psychologists and best-selling authors, including Robert Cialdini, author of Influence. He writes; "With 10 sensible steps to take, Noreena Hertz charts a sound decision-making route for us through a world in hyper-drive. I'd recommend a prudent first step-get this book". John Crace, reviewing for The Guardian, wrote: "Every week, another 150 self-help books are published. How do you know this one is any different from the others? It isn't." He summarised the book as "Eyes fast closing." Daisy Goodwin, for the Sunday Times, concluded that although the books reads like an airport book, "it is actually a practical guide to critical thinking in the digital age that is as useful for students as it is for CEOs." Despite finding the book "slightly exhausting", she concluded it was "an admirable guide to predicting the factors that affect our decision-making." Julian Baggini, for the Financial Times, observing: "[T]he more confidently a book claims to help you make better choices, the less it is likely to do so. Noreena Hertz's Eyes Wide Open is a case in point. Reading it, I did, indeed, often find myself wide-eyed, startled by its bold, simplistic claims. There is a need for a synthesis of the many insights gathered by recent research into cognitive biases and the other often hidden processes that shape our decisions." Baggini claims that Daniel Kahneman has published much better advice in 2011 with Thinking, Fast and Slow.

=== Generation K (2015) ===
In 2015 Hertz began researching what she has called Generation K – 13- to 20-year-olds. K is for Katniss Everdeen, the feisty heroine of the global franchise The Hunger Games. She presented her initial thinking on Generation K in 2015 at the World Economic Forum and at the Women in the World Summit in New York City. Here she unveiled results from her 2015 study of 2000 American and British Teenagers. Its key findings include that this generation is more anxious than previous ones, more intent on being unique, and more concerned about inequality. She posits that they have been profoundly shaped not only by technology but also by the recession and an increasing sense of existential threat. She writes: "unlike those currently aged between 20 and 30, the "Yes we can" generation, who grew up believing the world was their oyster, for Generation K the world is less oyster, more Hobbesian nightmare."

Hertz defines this generation as having been profoundly shaped by three global forces: the rapid development of technology – this is the first smartphone generation, the worst recession the West faced in decades, and the increased existential threat from evolving terrorist groups. According to her, distinct traits of Generation K include anxiety, loneliness, a desire for connection, a desire to co-create, a commitment to societal equality, anti-traditional institutions, commitment to the environment and fear about their own financial futures. Hertz's research into Generation K has been discussed in publications including The Guardian, the Financial Times, El Pais, the Washington Post, the Daily Telegraph, Campaign, The Huffington Post, and Newsweek.

=== The Lonely Century: A Call to Reconnect (2020) ===
Hertz's most recent book, The Lonely Century: A Call to Reconnect, was published in the UK by Sceptre in September 2020. The author argues that loneliness is becoming the defining condition of the twenty-first century, stemming from a combination of modern technological reliance, the gig economy, hyper-urbanisation, and decades of neoliberal policy. She explores how this epidemic of social isolation impacts individual health, damages economic productivity, and contributes to the rise of political populism.

The Lonely Century received widespread critical acclaim upon release and was named one of the best books of the year by publications including Wired (UK) and The Daily Telegraph. The Economist praised it as "an important new book," while The Guardian highlighted Hertz's "wide-ranging, convincing argument" regarding the breakdown of community structures. In addition to diagnosing the crisis, the book presents concrete policy solutions, architectural interventions, and communal frameworks aimed at rebuilding social capital and restoring human connection.

== Campaigns ==
In 2001 Hertz contemplated whether "increasingly the most effective way to be political is not to register one's demands and wants at the ballot box". As consumer activism went mainstream in Europe, she reasoned that "all over the developed, democratic world, people are shopping rather than voting". Hertz is the co-creator of Project (RED) (with Bono and Bobby Shriver), an innovative commercial model to raise money for people with AIDS in Africa that has generated over $500m for the Global Fund. Hertz played a key role in the Live 8 campaign to cancel the debt of the world's poorest countries, and was one of the speakers at the 2005 Edinburgh Live 8 concert. In late 2005 Hertz began to publicly criticise the Make Poverty History campaign. She claimed that it achieved "next to nothing". According to Hertz the campaign was not successful in advancing justice, empowerment or accountability.

=== Mayday for Nurses ===
In April 2007 Hertz launched the "Mayday for Nurses" campaign in Britain to alleviate the problems of low pay in nursing. Hertz promised nurses at the Royal College of Nursing annual conference that she would make sure that every football player in the Premier League would, by the end of the season, have donated one day's pay (totalling around £1.5 million) to a hardship fund for nurses struggling in their first few years. The campaign was filmed for a Channel 4 documentary, The Million Pound Footballers' Giveaway, broadcast on 7 June 2007.

Although the Nurses' hardship fund raised £750,000 after some of the Premiership's best-paid stars pitched in with a day's pay, the campaign received a "mixed response" and was described by some commentators as "intellectually flawed" and "a thinly-veiled form of blackmail." Gareth Southgate, then the manager of Middlesbrough F.C., cancelled his club's donation after Hertz published a list of footballers who had contributed, "effectively 'outing' those who had not." Southgate said: "I am disgusted with the manner in which this campaign has gone about its fundraising. Mayday for Nurses is a worthy cause, but there are many others. The players at this club support any number of local and national charities and good causes, either via financial support, giving up their own time or both. This is often done privately, meaning they neither receive nor ask for any public gratitude or praise." Moritz Volz, then playing for Fulham F.C., explained in The Times: "Everyone in our squad decided to donate a day's pay to the Mayday for Nurses appeal. But [Hertz's] ignorance [of football and the media] is what caused it to backfire. Instead of focusing on poor pay for nurses, the media coverage ended up being primarily about footballers and their money.".

Peter Carter, the general secretary of the Royal College of Nursing, said that the fund offered financial support and "a helping hand to nurses in times of hardship and times of need." Hertz said she picked nurses to be the beneficiaries of the campaign because they were among the worst paid public servants with professional qualifications, earning one-third less than teachers by the time they are established in their careers.

== Advisory roles, trusteeships ==
Hertz acts in an advisory capacity for major multinational corporations, CEOs, NGOs, and politicians, and sits on various corporate and charitable boards. She is a former member of the Inclusive Capitalism Task Force and served as an Advisory Board Member to Citigroup's Politics and Economics Global Advisory Board (2007–08). She is also a former Trustee of the Institute for Public Policy Research (2010–15). Hertz currently serves as a Non-Executive Director on the boards of Warner Music Group (since 2014), Workhuman (since 2022), and Mattel (since 2023).

== Personal life ==
Hertz is married to Danny Cohen, the former Director of BBC Television. They were married in 2012 at the Bevis Marks Synagogue in the City of London in a ceremony conducted by Lord Sacks, the Chief Rabbi. They live in Primrose Hill, London.
