= Ian Kehoe =

Irish journalist

- Born: 8 September 1980 (age 45); Enniscorthy, Ireland
- Education: Dublin City University
- Occupation: Journalist

Ian Kehoe is an Irish journalist, writer, broadcaster, and co-founder of The Currency. He was editor of The Sunday Business Post and a board Member of RTÉ.

== Early life and education ==
Kehoe is from Enniscorthy in County Wexford, in the south-east of Ireland. He holds a degree in journalism and a masters in international relations from Dublin City University (DCU).

== Career ==
Kehoe worked as business editor, and deputy editor, before becoming editor of The Sunday Business Post in 2014. The paper reportedly experienced a "minor renaissance" under his tenure. At the time of the newspaper's sale to Enda O'Coineen in 2018, Kehoe resigned as editor to set up the digital business media outlet The Currency with his former deputy Tom Lyons, which Kehoe would also edit.

In 2019 Denis O'Brien brought a defamation case was brought against Kehoe, Lyons, and The Sunday Business Post. Kehoe admitted he had been involved in publishing inaccurate information about O'Brien but argued the overall article was "fair". O'Brien was unsuccessful in his claims and the high court awarded costs against the plaintiff, a decision subsequently described as "terrifically important" by Tim Vaughan, a fellow journalist and Former Editor of the Irish Examiner.

O'Brien's Communicorp banned Kehoe, Lyons and other Currency contributors later in 2019 from appearing on their stations (including Newstalk, Today FM and Spin). The corporation rescinded that ban after criticism from the NUJ and all parties in the Dáil, among others.

Kehoe was appointed to the board of RTÉ in 2018 and completed his term in 2023 amid controversy within the state broadcaster.

Kehoe served as the Deputy Chair of RTÉ and on the Audit Committee during the RTÉ Secret payments scandal. He was criticised for refusing to come before the Oireachtas Media committee to answer questions in relation to the boards handling of these matters, despite being paid approximately Euro 16,000 per annum. This was despite a direct appeal from the Committee Chair, Niamh Smyth.

Kehoe has worked as a reporter for two years on RTÉ's Prime Time current affairs show.

Kehoe co-founded The Currency, a business and news website in 2019. The Currency entered profit within 2 years of setup and Kehoe and his Co-founder Tom Lyons shared approximately Euro188,000 pay in 2023.

== Publishing ==
In 2013, along with Gavin Daly, he published Citizen Quinn about the rise and fall of Sean Quinn.

In 2019, along with Tom Lyons, he launched The Currency, a business and news website.

== Books ==
- Citizen Quinn by Gavin Daly and Ian Kehoe, Penguin Ireland, 2013.
