= Business Post =

Irish national financial Sunday newspaper

- "Ireland's financial, political and economic newspaper"
- Front page 8 February 2015
- Type: Sunday newspaper
- Format: Broadsheet
- Owner(s): Bonnier News, with minority owner Kilcullen Kapital Partners (Enda O'Coineen)
- Founder(s): Frank Fitzgibbon, Damien Kiberd, James Morrissey, and Aileen O'Toole
- Editor: Daniel McConnell
- Founded: 26 November 1989
- Language: English
- Headquarters: Block B, The Merrion Centre, Merrion Road, Dublin, Ireland.
- City: Dublin
- Country: Ireland
- Circulation: No longer ABC audited.
- ISSN: 0791-2617
- Website: Business Post

The Business Post, formerly The Sunday Business Post, is a Sunday newspaper distributed nationally in Ireland and an online publication. Founded in 1989, it is focused mainly on business and financial issues in Ireland. On 20 January 2025, the newspaper was made available on the Irish Newspaper Archives.

== History ==
=== From founding to the Irish financial crisis (1989–2013) ===
The Sunday Business Post was co-founded by four people: the economist and editor Damien Kiberd, Aileen O'Toole (former editor of Business & Finance), Frank Fitzgibbon (editor of The Sunday Times Ireland), and James Morrissey (spokesperson for Denis O'Brien). The Sunday Business Post was previously owned by Thomas Crosbie Holdings (TCH). It was then owned by Key Capital, Paul Cooke and staff members (6% equity for staff). It was then owned by Sunrise Media, the shareholders of which include Key Capital. It is now owned by Kilcullen Capital Partners.

The paper's first edition appeared on 26 November 1989. While TCH's other major newspaper titles, the Irish Examiner and Evening Echo, are based in Cork, the Post is published in Dublin. The paper describes itself as "Ireland's Political, Economic and Financial Newspaper". It is a general newspaper with a strong emphasis on commerce, politics and financial markets. The newspaper does not have a sports section or letters section. Three supplements are published weekly with the newspaper: Post Plus, The Magazine, an entertainment and features magazine; and a property supplement. A once-monthly Computers in Business magazine is also included. Ted Harding succeeded Kiberd as editor of the paper in 2001 and edited the paper for three years, resigning in October 2004.

=== Examinership (2013) ===
An interim examiner was formally appointed to Post Publications Ltd, publisher of The Sunday Business Post newspaper, on 15 March 2013. The High Court was told that there might be a voluntary redundancy scheme at the newspaper in late 2013 which would target 25 staff positions. This could coincide with pay cuts of 7% for employees and further possible changes as part of a financial restructuring plan for the company, the court was told.

It was reported on 28 April 2013 that two companies were interested in acquiring The Sunday Business Post from the examiner. Landmark Media Investments, which acquired some of the assets of Thomas Crosbie Holdings, was no longer interested in the title. It was also reported that The Sunday Business Post required an investment of at least €2m to acquire the paper and restructure it. Any new bidder would have to fund the cost of laying off some staff.

On 8 May 2013, it was reported that The Sunday Business Post had started staff redundancies. Up to ten staff were to leave the company by 10 May 2013. Staff were also told about a third pay cut. Post Publications was also looking to reduce the amount paid to its landlord by €1 million per year. It was reported on 12 May 2013 that bidders for The Sunday Business Post included Michael Brophy, a former chief executive of Independent News & Media (Northern Ireland).

On 15 May 2013, Post Publications was back in court. It reported that the examiner had failed to find a buyer in the first 70 days of the examinership. The examiner was given a final 30-day extension to find a buyer. If a buyer did not materialise, the examiner had to advise the court immediately. Annual revenue fell from €15.3 million to €7.3 million in the five years to 2013. Circulation revenue fell from €4.9 million to €3.6 million in the last 5 years to 2013. The newspaper had 76 full-time employees and 123 freelance contributors and made a loss of €1.2 million in the year to 2013.

=== Paul Cooke and Key Capital ownership (2013–2018) ===
On 8 June 2013, it emerged that Key Capital, Paul Cooke and staff (6% equity for staff) had acquired The Sunday Business Post. Examinership ended on 19 June 2013. The new owners of The Sunday Business Post, Brindisi Ltd, took out a €350,000 loan to part-fund the purchase. Several staff left the paper, including former chief executive Fiachra O'Riordan, former senior assistant editor Kieron Wood and former deputy chief sub-editor Garvan Grant. In the trading year for 2014, Post Publications Limited made a pre-tax loss of €628,000. Post Publications Limited paid €409,374 for redundancy payments and a new premises. Shareholders had pumped an additional €300,000 into the company; staff numbers had reduced again. Post Publications employed an average of 61 people in the year to the end of June 2014. Both circulation and advertising revenue remain "under pressure", the directors noted. In July 2014, Post Publications Ltd., the publisher of the paper, announced that Cliff Taylor would leave the paper after ten years as editor. Pat Leahy, the paper's deputy editor and political editor, was the paper's acting editor until Ian Kehoe was made editor. On 13 July 2016, it was announced that Paul Cooke had sold his stake to Key Capital. Cooke also resigned as managing director. The Sunday Business Post became legally owned by Sunrise Media, and the main shareholder in Sunrise Media is Conor Killeen's Key Capital.

=== Kilcullen Capital ownership (2018–2026) ===
In September 2017, it was reported that The Sunday Business Post was for sale. In September 2018, it was announced that Kilcullen Kapital Partners (KKP) had acquired The Sunday Business Post under the ownership of Enda O'Coineen. KKP owned The Sunday Business Post via a company called Encircle Business Post 365. In October 2018, it was announced that a three-to-four-month consultation was occurring at The Sunday Business Post that might lead to the print closure. At a later stage, it was announced that the paper version of the paper would not close. In March 2019, it was announced that Encircle Business Post 365, the company that owns The Sunday Business Post, had acquired event management company iQuest from outgoing owner Michael Nolan. In April 2019, it was announced that the CEO of the Post Publications was leaving the company, and it was reported that The Sunday Business Post owner might float it on a stock exchange.

In 2019 it was reported that Dennis O'Brien had taken a defamation case against the newspaper earlier that year but lost it.

In July 2019, it was reported that Beach Point Capital have provided backing to the owners of The Sunday Business Post. Beach Point Capital have a charge over certain assets. Beach Point Capital have also provided backing to Maximum Media and Irish Studio. Also in July 2019, Richie Oakley was made the editor of The Sunday Business Post. In September 2019, it was revealed that the previous owner, Sunrise Media, wrote off €1.1m it had invested in the newspaper following its sale to Kilcullen Kapital.

In September 2019, it was reported that big changes were to occur at The Sunday Business Post, including to go daily, global, and change the name to the Business Post. In October 2019, it was reported that the owner of The Sunday Business Post had closed a deal to buy a portfolio of magazine titles including Irish Tatler, Food & Wine and Auto Ireland, from US-Irish investors in an all-share transaction. In November 2019, 30 years after it first launched, The Sunday Business Post was renamed the Business Post. Kilcullen's Colm O'Reilly was its chief executive. In April 2020, the Business Post cut staff salaries and availed of government support. Advertising had declined due to the COVID-19 pandemic.

In November 2022 it was reported that Swedish publishing giant Bonnier was in advanced talks to buy a minority stake in Business Post Media Group from majority owner Enda O'Coineen. This would make it no longer the only fully Irish-owned Sunday paper.

In January 2023, Daniel McConnell was made editor of the Business Post.

=== Bonnier News majority ownership (2026−present) ===
In June 2026, minority owner Bonnier News announced that it would take a majority position, with Enda O'Coineen and Endeavour Nominees as significant shareholders. This received regulatory approval in September 2026, which was followed by the appointment of a new board of directors.

== Circulation history ==
Year (period)	Average circulation per issue
2009 (January to June)	57,783
2012 (January to June)	41,040
2012 (July to December)	39,416
2014 (July to December)	33,233
2015 (January to June)	32,498
2016 (January to June)	31,364
2016 (July to December)	30,244
2017 (January to June)	30,202
2017 (July to December)	29,619
2018 (January to June)	28,701
2018 (July to December)	26,652
2019 (January to July)	25,740

No ABC circulation statistics are available post June 2019 because the Business Post no longer publishes a certificate.
