= Cliff Taylor =

Cliff Taylor may refer to:

- Cliff Taylor (American football) (born 1952), former American football player for the Chicago Bears and Green Bay Packers
- Cliff Taylor (Australian footballer) (1914–1986), Australian rules footballer for Geelong
- Cliff Taylor (journalist), managing editor of The Irish Times
- Cliff Taylor (actor), American actor starring in Outlaw Women and Spitting Image

== See also ==
- Clifford Taylor (born 1942), American judge
