= Open Wide (album) =

Studio album by Inhaler
- Released: 7 February 2025
- Genre: Indie rock; pop rock
- Length: 48:11
- Label: Polydor
- Producer: Kid Harpoon

Inhaler chronology
| Cuts & Bruises (2023) | Open Wide (2025) |

Singles from Open Wide
- 1. "Your House" Released: 29 October 2024; 2. "Open Wide" Released: 6 December 2024; 3. "A Question Of You" Released: 17 January 2025; 4. "Billy (Yeah Yeah Yeah)" Released: 5 February 2025; 5. "Hole in the Ground" Released: 29 October 2025

Open Wide is the third album by Irish rock band Inhaler. It was released through Polydor Records on 7 February 2025, and was met with favourable critical reception.

The album debuted at No.2 on the UK Albums Chart, earning the band its third top-ten effort on the chart, following 2023's Cuts & Bruises (No. 2) and their chart-topping It Won't Always Be Like This (2021). Open Wide entered atop the Irish Albums Chart, marking their third consecutive number one in the native country.

== Background and release ==
In an interview with The Independent, Inhaler frontman Elijah Hewson said that Open Wide reflects his "quarter-life crisis".

Open Wide was released through Polydor Records on 7 February 2025.

== Critical reception ==
Professional ratings
Aggregate scores
| Source | Rating |
|---|---|
| Metacritic | 76/100 |
Review scores
| Source | Rating |
| Clash | 8/10 |
| The Independent | 4/5 stars |
| MusicOMH | 2.5/5 stars |
| NME | 4/5 stars |

According to the review aggregator Metacritic, Open Wide received "generally favorable reviews" based on a weighted average score of 76 out of 100 from 5 critic scores. It received positive reviews from The Independent, NME, and Clash, as well as a mixed review from MusicOMH.

=== Year-end lists ===
Year-end lists
| Publication | List | Rank | Ref. |
|---|---|---|---|
| Dork | Albums of the Year 2025 | 17 | |

== Track listing ==
All tracks are written by Elijah Hewson, Josh Jenkinson, Robert Keating and Ryan McMahon, with Amy Allen as an additional songwriter on "Eddie in the Darkness" and "Open Wide".

| No. | Title | Length |
|---|---|---|
| 1. | "Eddie in the Darkness" | 3:35 |
| 2. | "Billy (Yeah Yeah Yeah)" | 4:05 |
| 3. | "Your House" | 3:47 |
| 4. | "A Question of You" | 3:42 |
| 5. | "Even Though" | 3:18 |
| 6. | "Again" | 3:36 |
| 7. | "Open Wide" | 4:48 |
| 8. | "All I Got Is You" | 3:44 |
| 9. | "Still Young" | 3:21 |
| 10. | "The Charms" | 3:45 |
| 11. | "X-Ray" | 3:23 |
| 12. | "Concrete" | 3:49 |
| 13. | "Little Things" | 3:14 |
| 14. | "Hole in the Ground" | 3:45^{A} |
| Total length: | | 48:11 |

Notes

- ^{A} "Hole in the Ground" was appended to streaming editions of the album later on, being released on October 29, 2025. It was added in November, 6 2025.

== Personnel ==
=== Inhaler ===
- Elijah Hewson – vocals, electric guitar (all tracks); background vocals (tracks 2, 8)
- Robert Keating – bass guitar (all tracks), background vocals (tracks 1, 2, 5–8, 10, 13), synth bass (3)
- Josh Jenkinson – keyboards (all tracks), electric guitar (tracks 1–8, 10–13), background vocals (1, 2); acoustic guitar, organ (9)
- Ryan McMahon – drums (all tracks), background vocals (track 1)

=== Additional contributors ===
- Kid Harpoon – production (all tracks), synthesizer (tracks 2–13), Hammond B3 (3), background vocals (7, 8)
- Randy Merrill – mastering
- Mark "Spike" Stent – mixing
- Brian Rajaratnam – engineering
- Liam Hebb – recording, engineering assistance
- Emi Trevena – additional engineering
- Andrea Cozzaglio – additional engineering (tracks 1–12), additional production (track 9), engineering (track 9–10), piano (track 10), programming (tracks 2, 9, 10)
- Matt Wolach – mixing assistance
- Tommy Turner – mixing assistance
- Natalie Maddix – choir arrangement, alto vocals (tracks 3, 4, 7, 9)
- Daniel Thomas – choir arrangement (tracks 3, 4, 7, 9)
- Laura Leon – alto vocals (tracks 3, 4, 7, 9)
- Shayanne Campbell – alto vocals (tracks 3, 4, 7, 9)
- Siziwe Sayiya – alto vocals (tracks 3, 4, 7, 9)
- Cleo Stewart – soprano vocals (tracks 3, 4, 7, 9)
- Leanna Leid – soprano vocals (tracks 3, 4, 7, 9)
- Roslyn Adonteng – soprano vocals (tracks 3, 4, 7, 9)
- Vânia Lima – soprano vocals (tracks 3, 4, 7, 9)
- Anton Denny-Brown – tenor vocals (tracks 3, 4, 7, 9)
- Charles Dawson – tenor vocals (tracks 3, 4, 7, 9)
- Christian Jamieson Idos – tenor vocals (tracks 3, 4, 7, 9)
- Dean Patron – tenor vocals (tracks 3, 4, 7, 9)

== Charts ==
Chart performance for Open Wide
| Chart (2025) | Peak position |
|---|---|
| Austrian Albums (Ö3 Austria) | 50 |
| Belgian Albums (Ultratop Flanders) | 8 |
| Belgian Albums (Ultratop Wallonia) | 51 |
| Dutch Albums (Album Top 100) | 8 |
| German Albums (Offizielle Top 100) | 18 |
| Irish Albums (OCC) | 1 |
| Scottish Albums (OCC) | 2 |
| Swiss Albums (Schweizer Hitparade) | 64 |
| UK Albums (OCC) | 2 |
