= Image (Irish magazine) =

Irish lifestyle and fashion magazine

IMAGE
- Categories: Lifestyle and fashion
- Frequency: Monthly
- Founded: 1975; 51 years ago
- Company: IMAGE Publications
- Country: Ireland
- Based in: Dún Laoghaire, Dún Laoghaire–Rathdown
- Website: www.image.ie

Image (stylised as IMAGE) is an Irish lifestyle and fashion magazine launched in 1975 by publisher Kevin Kelly and his wife Rose. It has 120,000 readers a month and is "Ireland's best-read glossy".

IMAGE Media today: From podcasts to print, video to virtual events, social to online, the award-winning team are multi-channel creators who bring ideas that matter and stories that captivate their community of informed, intelligent Irish women and men. IMAGE.ie now sees an average of 500,000 unique users a month. Image and its sister title Image Interiors was published by magazine publisher Kevin Kelly. Other titles include Image Brides and Garden Heaven.

In 2010, Kelly sold his share in the Image Publications Limited to a director of the company Robert Power, the company had been financed by loans from Power and another director and the second editor of the magazine Ann Reihill. Reihill retired from the magazine in 2016.
