= Irish Examiner =

Irish national daily newspaper

- Type: Daily newspaper
- Format: Broadsheet
- Owner: The Irish Times
- Founded: 1841; 185 years ago
- Political alignment: Centrist
- Headquarters: Linn Dubh, Blackpool, Cork; 80 Oliver Plunkett Street, Cork
- Circulation: No longer ABC audited
- ISSN: 1393-9564
- Website: irishexaminer.com

The Irish Examiner, formerly The Cork Examiner and then The Examiner, is an Irish national daily newspaper which primarily circulates in the Munster region surrounding its base in Cork, though it is available throughout the country.

== History ==
=== 19th and early 20th centuries ===
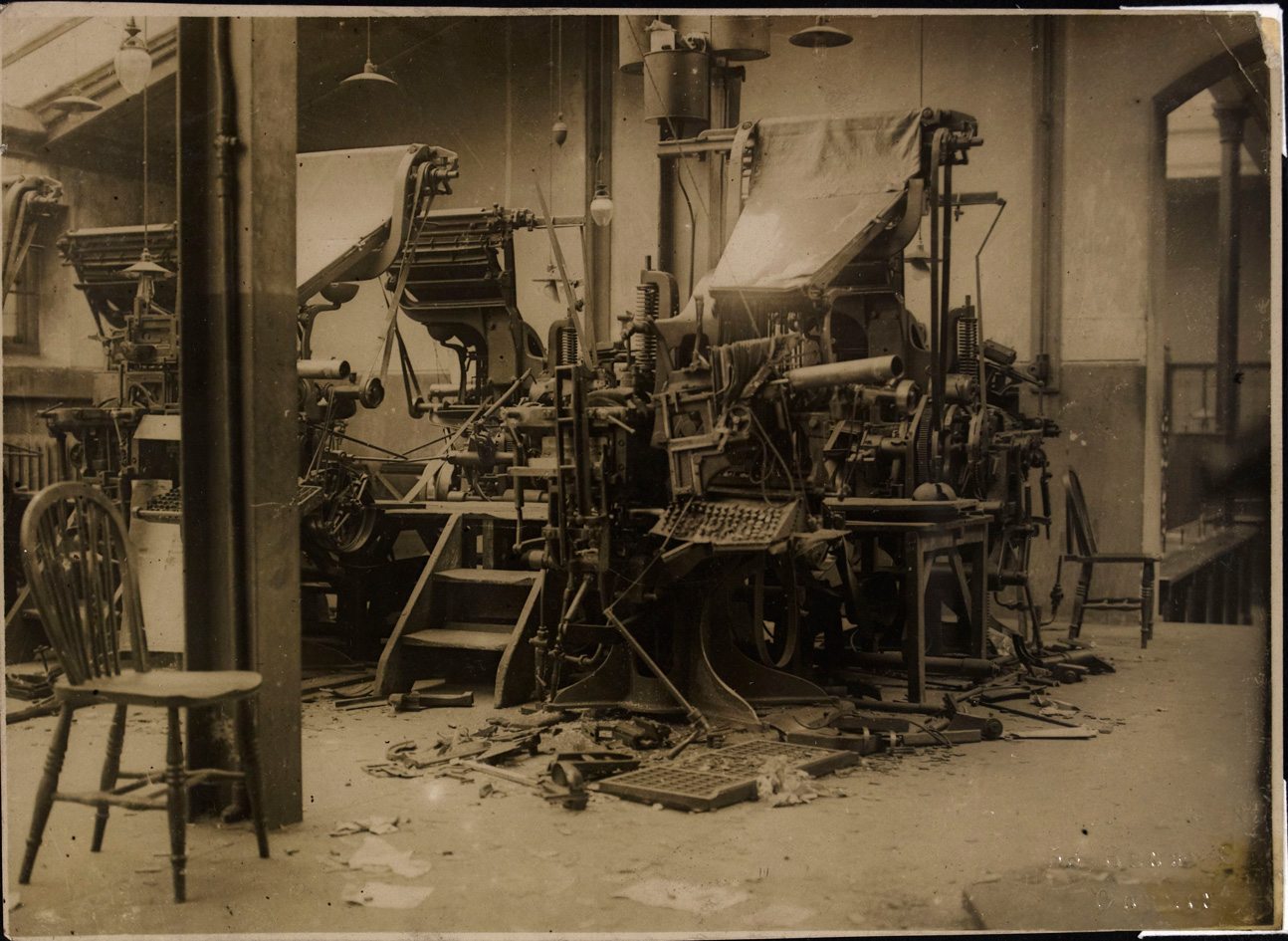
Cork Examiner presses smashed by Anti-Treaty forces before Free State forces arrived in Cork, 9–10 August 1922

The paper was founded by John Francis Maguire under the title The Cork Examiner in 1841 in support of the Catholic Emancipation and tenant rights work of Daniel O'Connell. Historical copies of The Cork Examiner, dating back to 1841, are available to search and view in digitised form at the Irish Newspaper Archives website and British Newspaper Archive.

During the Irish War of Independence and Irish Civil War, the Cork Examiner (along with other nationalist newspapers) was subject to censorship and suppression.

At the time of the Spanish Civil War, the Cork Examiner reportedly took a strongly pro-Franco tone in its coverage of the conflict. As of the early to mid-20th century, the newspaper reportedly catered to a "socially-conservative reader base" and reflected a "conservative nationalist agenda".

=== Renaming and ownership ===
Published as The Cork Examiner from 1841 until 1996, the newspaper was renamed The Examiner in 1996. Since 2000 it has been published as The Irish Examiner, to appeal to a wider national readership.

The newspaper, along with 'sister paper' the Evening Echo, was part of the Thomas Crosbie Holdings group. Thomas Crosbie Holdings went into receivership in March 2013. The newspaper was acquired by Landmark Media Investments.

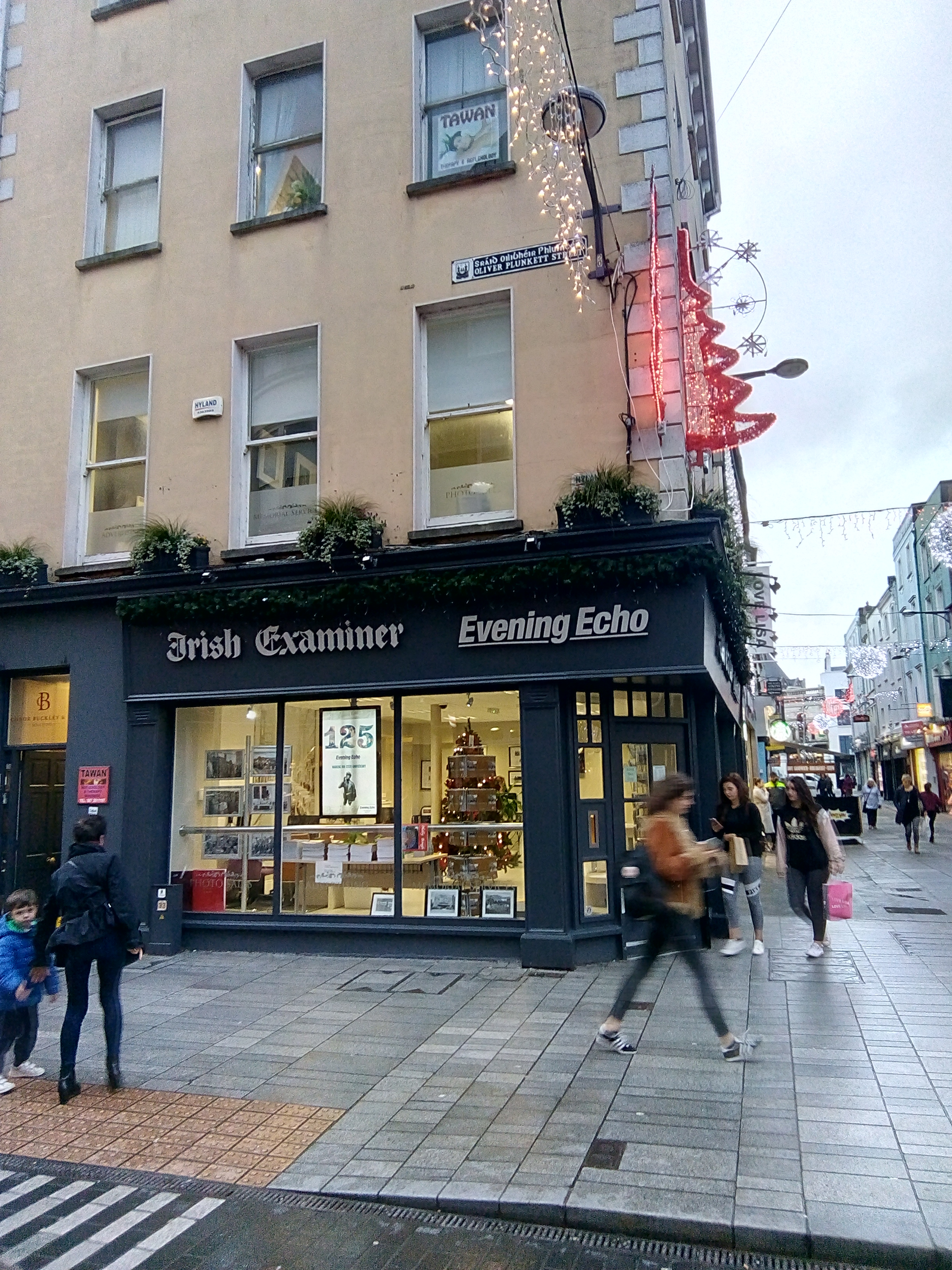
Irish Examiner premises on Oliver Plunkett Street

As of 2004, its chief executive was Thomas J. Murphy, and its editor was Tim Vaughan. Vaughan left the group in August 2016.

The newspaper was based at Academy Street, Cork for over a century, before moving to new offices at Lapp's Quay, Cork in early November 2006, and subsequently to editorial offices at Blackpool, Cork, with a sales office in Oliver Plunkett Street.

=== Sale to The Irish Times ===
In February 2017, it was reported that Landmark Media Investments had appointed KPMG to advise on a range of options, including an Independent News and Media link with the Irish Examiner.

In March 2017, it was reported that The Irish Times might bid for the Irish Examiner, and by April 2017 both The Irish Times and INM had entered a sales process and signed non-disclosure agreements.

In May 2017, it was reported that Sunrise Media and The Irish Times were exploring an acquisition, and a sale was agreed to The Irish Times in December 2017, pending regulatory approval. The sale to The Irish Times was completed in July 2018.

As of 2021, its editorial policy has been described as centrist or conservative; the Eurotopics website described the political orientation of the Irish Examiner as liberal.

In July 2025, John O'Mahony was appointed as editor of the Irish Examiner and The Echo.

== Circulation ==
Average print circulation was approximately 57,000 copies per issue in 1990, had risen to 62,000 by 1999, had decreased to 50,000 by 2009, and was approximately 28,000 by 2017. Reflecting a changing trend in newspaper sales, the Examiner markets to advertisers on the basis of its print and online audience, stating in 2017 that "236,000 people read the Irish Examiner in print or online every day".

Year (period)	Average circulation per issue
1990	57,601
1991	56,764
1992	55,565
1993	53,188
1994	52,062
1995	52,932
1996	55,196
1997	56,628
1998	58,536
1999 (July to September)	62,413
2006 (January to June)	57,217
2009 (January to June)	50,346
2010 (January to June)	46,687
2011 (January to June)	43,390
2012 (July to December)	39,555
2013 (July to December)	37,009
2014 (January to June)	35,028
2015 (January to June)	33,198
2016 (January to June)	30,964
2017 (January to June)	28,338
2017 (July to December)	27,589
2018 (January to June)	26,085
2018 (July to December)	25,419
2019 (January to June)	24,574
2019 (July to December)	23,387

The Irish Examiner exited ABC circulation audits in 2020.
