= Sunrise Media =

Sunrise Media Limited was created in 2016 to act as a holding company for The Sunday Business Post and the Cork publisher Webprint Concepts. The major shareholder in Sunrise Media Limited is Key Capital. Key Capital's shareholders include Conor Kileen. As of 2016, the CEO of Sunrise Media Limited was Siobhan Lennon.

Sunrise Media Limited was set up on 11 July 2016 as an Irish company with a registered address at Huguenot House, St Stephen's Green, Dublin 2.

While Sunrise Media was reportedly included in a list of potential buyers of the Irish Examiner from Landmark Media Investments in 2017, ultimately the Irish Examiner was acquired by The Irish Times.

In September 2017, it was reported that The Sunday Business Post and Webprint Concepts might be sold, and the former had been sold to Enda O'Coineen by September 2018. Webprint, which had 25 full-time employees as of mid-2018, was sold by Sunrise Media in March 2019.

== See also ==
Sunwise Media, for the American production company
