= Cuts & Bruises =

Studio album by Inhaler
- Released: 17 February 2023
- Studios: Narcissus Studio, London
- Genre: Indie rock
- Length: 45:37
- Label: Polydor
- Producer: Antony Genn

Inhaler chronology
It Won't Always Be Like This (2021)	Cuts & Bruises (2023)	Open Wide (2025)

Singles from Cuts & Bruises
- 1. "These Are the Days" Released: 7 June 2022; 2. "Love Will Get You There" Released: 13 October 2022; 3. "If You're Gonna Break My Heart" Released: 1 February 2023; 4. "Just to Keep You Satisfied" Released: 11 June 2023

Cuts & Bruises is the second studio album by Irish rock band Inhaler. It was released on 17 February 2023 through Polydor Records.

== Background ==
Work for Cuts & Bruises began while touring for their debut album It Won't Always Be Like This in early 2022. Of the process, band member Elijah Hewson told Billboard: "I think we learned a lot of lessons on [It Won't Always Be Like This], and I think when we came into the second we had a better picture of how we wanted to do things. [...] I think the main thing we said is we wanted less information, to let the songs breathe a bit. I think we were just more confident, and you don't have to add as much if you are confident in the songs and material. And that was the basis of what we went off and I think it guided us pretty well".

== Singles ==
The album's lead single, "These Are the Days", was released on 7 June 2022. The second single, "Love Will Get You There", was released on 13 October 2022. The third single, "If You're Gonna Break My Heart", was released on 1 February 2023.

== Critical reception ==
Professional ratings
Aggregate scores
Source	Rating
AnyDecentMusic?	7.2/10
Metacritic	72/100
Review scores
Source	Rating
Clash	7/10
Dork	4/5 stars
Gigwise	9/10
The Independent	3/5 stars
The Irish Times	3/5 stars
NME	4/5 stars
The Telegraph	4/5 stars

Upon release, Cuts & Bruises received generally positive reviews from music critics. At Metacritic, which assigns a normalised rating out of 100 to reviews from mainstream critics, the album received an average of 72 based on four critical reviews. Another music aggregator AnyDecentMusic? gave the album 7.2 out of 10 based on their assessment of the critical consensus.

== Track listing ==
All tracks are written by Elijah Hewson, Josh Jenkinson, Robert Keating, Ryan McMahon, and Antony Genn.

Cuts & Bruises track listing
No.	Title	Length
1.	"Just to Keep You Satisfied"	3:35
2.	"Love Will Get You There"	4:10
3.	"So Far So Good"	3:13
4.	"These Are the Days"	3:45
5.	"If You're Gonna Break My Heart"	4:27
6.	"Perfect Storm"	3:43
7.	"Dublin in Ecstasy"	5:11
8.	"When I Have Her on My Mind"	4:01
9.	"Valentine"	4:07
10.	"The Things I Do"	4:42
11.	"Now You Got Me"	4:42
Total length:		45:37

Japanese edition bonus track
No.	Title	Length
12.	"You Might Get What You Want"	4:10
Total length:		49:54

== Personnel ==
Inhaler

- Elijah Hewson – vocals, electric guitar (all tracks); synthesizer (1, 3, 7, 8, 10), keyboards (2, 4), background vocals (3, 8, 10), acoustic guitar (6, 7)
- Robert Keating – bass guitar (all tracks), background vocals (1, 2, 4–11), synthesizer (1, 3, 6, 8–11), keyboards (2)
- Ryan McMahon – drums
- Josh Jenkinson – electric guitar (all tracks), background vocals (1, 2, 4–11), synthesizer (1, 3, 6, 8–11); keyboards, percussion (2)

Additional musicians

- Antony Genn – percussion (1–9, 11), drum machine (1), stylophone (1, 3), theremin (1, 3), keyboards (2, 4), background vocals (4), string arrangement (5, 6), synthesizer (7, 11)
- Andrea Cozzaglio – programming
- Drew Dungate Smith – programming (1–9, 11)
- Martin Slattery – Hammond organ (2, 5, 6, 9), piano (5)
- Amy Langley – cello, string arrangement (5, 6)
- Richard Harwood – cello (5, 6)
- Jessie Murphy – violin (5, 6)
- Kotono Sato – violin (5, 6)
- Marianne Haynes – violin (5, 6)
- Rosie Langley – violin (5, 6)

Technical

- Antony Genn – production
- John Davis – mastering
- John Catlin – mixing
- Drew Dungate Smith – engineering
- Andrea Cozzaglio – additional engineering

== Charts ==
=== Weekly charts ===
Weekly chart performance for Cuts & Bruises
Chart (2023)	Peak position
Belgian Albums (Ultratop Flanders)	9
Belgian Albums (Ultratop Wallonia)	29
Dutch Albums (Album Top 100)	5
German Albums (Offizielle Top 100)	35
Irish Albums (Official Charts)	1
Scottish Albums (Official Charts)	2
Swiss Albums (Schweizer Hitparade)	87
UK Albums (Official Charts)	2

=== Year-end charts ===
Year-end chart performance for Cuts & Bruises
Chart (2023)	Position
UK Cassette Albums (OCC)	7

== Certifications ==
Certifications for Cuts & Bruises
Region	Certification	Certified units/sales
United Kingdom (BPI)	Silver	60,000^{‡}
^{‡} Sales+streaming figures based on certification alone.
