= Kieron Wood =

Barrister and journalist

- Born: 15 August 1949; Surrey, England
- Died: 26 February 2023 (aged 73); Dublin, Ireland
- Education: King's Inns
- Occupations: Journalist and barrister
- Employer: Raidió Teilifís Éireann (RTÉ)

Kieron Wood (15 August 1949 – 26 February 2023) was an English journalist and writer who was active on Raidió Teilifís Éireann (RTÉ) and with the Sunday Business Post. He also practiced as a barrister.

== Career ==
Wood joined RTÉ in 1978, working initially as a radio sub-editor and television reporter. He was appointed religious affairs correspondent in 1987 before becoming legal affairs correspondent in 1990. One of the biggest news stories he covered was followed by a book called The Kilkenny Incest Case.

After studying law at the King's Inns, Wood qualified with first-class honours as a barrister in 1995. He represented the first spouse to obtain a High Court divorce after it was allowed under the legislation introduced following the 1995 referendum. Wood was appointed senior assistant editor at the Sunday Business Post in 2000.

== Recognition ==
Wood won the Law Society's Justice Media Award several times and also received an Order of Malta silver medal in recognition of his broadcasting work.

== Illness and death ==
Wood first experienced symptoms of Progressive Supranuclear Palsy (PSP) aged 67, when he had difficulty playing the piano and typing. He eventually received the diagnosis of PSP.

Wood died on 26 February 2023, at the age of 73.
