= Frank Fitzgibbon =

Irish journalist

Frank Fitzgibbon is an Irish newspaper editor and journalist. He was one of the four founders of The Sunday Business Post in 1989. Fitzgibbon edited the Republic of Ireland edition of The Sunday Times for 15 years from 2005 until 2020. He worked as a freelance journalist and then as editor of Kevin Kelly's monthly Irish Business Magazine before setting up The Sunday Business Post. Fitzgibbon also worked for the Sunday Tribune, Business & Finance magazine and as a presenter and reporter on current affairs for RTÉ Television. He worked as business editor of The Sunday Times Ireland from 2002 until he succeeded Fiona McHugh.

The son of journalist and broadcaster Denis ('Din Joe') Fitzgibbon, he is originally from Bancroft, Tallaght, County Dublin. He was educated at St Mary's College, Dublin. He was appointed to the Press Council of Ireland in 2018.
