= Ideas Campaign =

Economic initiative

The Ideas Campaign

The Ideas Campaign is a grassroots initiative in the Republic of Ireland asking ordinary people for ideas to stimulate economic activity.

The origins of the campaign can be traced back to the TV appearance by businesswoman Aileen O'Toole on a special edition of the current affairs programme Prime Time on RTÉ about the state of the Irish economy in January 2009.

She argued in the programme that the current focus on economic problems meant that positive, practical ideas for economic growth were being overlooked.

In response to her appearance, Prime Time did a follow-up programme on 5 March 2009, on which she launched the Ideas Campaign.

The submission for ideas closed at the end of March 2009 and centres on a website - IdeasCampaign.ie - on which ordinary citizens can submit their ideas to stimulate economic growth.

Some 1,750 ideas were submitted in the campaign's first week

The ideas were then reviewed by an advisory group and distilled into a report. The action plan was released on the 14 May. Read the full Ideas Campaign Action Plan.

The Taoiseach, Brian Cowen, issued a statement on 8 March 2009 that he would ensure that the report will be "fast-tracked to the Cabinet sub-committee on Economic Renewal for assessment and implementation, where appropriate".

On Tuesday 21 July 2009 the Irish Government announced its response to the Ideas Campaign. A total of 17 of the 44 ideas included in the campaign's Action Plan, in areas such as active citizenship, the knowledge economy, tourism and government finances, are to be implemented on the recommendation of the Cabinet Committee on Economic Renewal.
