= Aileen O'Toole =

Irish journalist and businesswoman

Aileen O’Toole is a former Irish journalist, notable as a co-founder of The Sunday Business Post, and an online communication consultant.

== Life ==
=== Early life ===
From the Northside of Dublin, Aileen O'Toole attended Manor House School in Raheny. After her Leaving Certificate she pursued a diploma in journalism, on what was then the only formal course in that area in Ireland, becoming the first in her family to qualify at third-level.

=== Career ===
==== Journalism ====
A business journalist, O'Toole was made editor of Business & Finance magazine at the age of 29, the first woman to edit a national business title in Ireland.

O'Toole was one of the four co-founders of The Sunday Business Post newspaper in 1989, and was both a director and Deputy Editor. She was a shareholder in the business until 1997, when it was sold to Trinity Mirror plc., which yielded a personal payout in excess of 1.1 million pounds. She continued as Deputy Editor for some time thereafter.

==== Digital marketing and strategy ====
In 2001, O'Toole co-founded an online communications and marketing consultancy, AMAS Ltd. with Maeve Kneafsey, the former CEO of one of Ireland's most active magazine publishers, Mike Hogan's Hoson Group. After buying out Kneafsey, O'Toole continued AMAS which provides strategic advice to private and public organisations on their online channels.

O'Toole has led a series of significant strategy projects for clients such as the Bank of Ireland Group and Diageo, the National Consumer Agency, Forfás, Aer Lingus and a number of Irish-based multinationals.

==== Not-for-profit work ====
O'Toole has served as a director of a number of not-for-profit organisations. She was a member of the board of Chambers Ireland, the country's largest business network, with 60 affiliated chambers and 13,000 members. She has also been a member of the board of Business in the Community (BITC), which promotes corporate responsibility and corporate community involvement in Ireland. She also served on the board of ASH Ireland, which is focused on reducing the impact of tobacco use in Irish society.

O'Toole is, as of 2019, and since 2014, a member of the board of the statutory body, the Road Safety Authority of Ireland.

==== Media ====
In March 2009, following an appearance on RTÉ's Prime Time current affairs programme about the state of the Irish economy, she launched the Ideas Campaign. "After Prime Time, people contacted me and agreed that we need to have different conversations about the Irish economy – about looking forward, about recognising positive developments in the economy and about capitalising on our qualities as an economy," she told reporters. "At the very least, we’re hoping that this campaign will start those conversations."

=== Personal life ===
O'Toole is married to Padraig, and has three children. In 2012, she tweeted extensively about two episodes of cancer, in 1994 and recently.
