= James Morrissey (PR consultant) =

Irish journalist, writer and public relations consultant

James Morrissey is an Irish journalist, writer and public relations consultant whose clients have included Denis O'Brien, Atlantic Philanthropies and Moya Doherty.

A native of Kiltimagh, County Mayo, he was educated at St. Joseph's College, County Galway and University College, Dubin. He was a music journalist with Spotlight magazine before joining Independent Newspapers.

He co-founded the Sunday Business Post in 1989 with Frank Fitzgibbon, Damien Kiberd and Aileen O’Toole.

He is a director of several companies including Newstalk, Crannog Books and Claddagh Records.

His book, The Bee's Knees, was published by Currach Press in 2020. His previous books include Omey, Inishbofin and Inishark, The Fastnet Lighthouse, On the Verge of Want (Crannog Books) and Hot Whiskey (The Kerryman).
