= Inhaler (band) =

Irish rock band

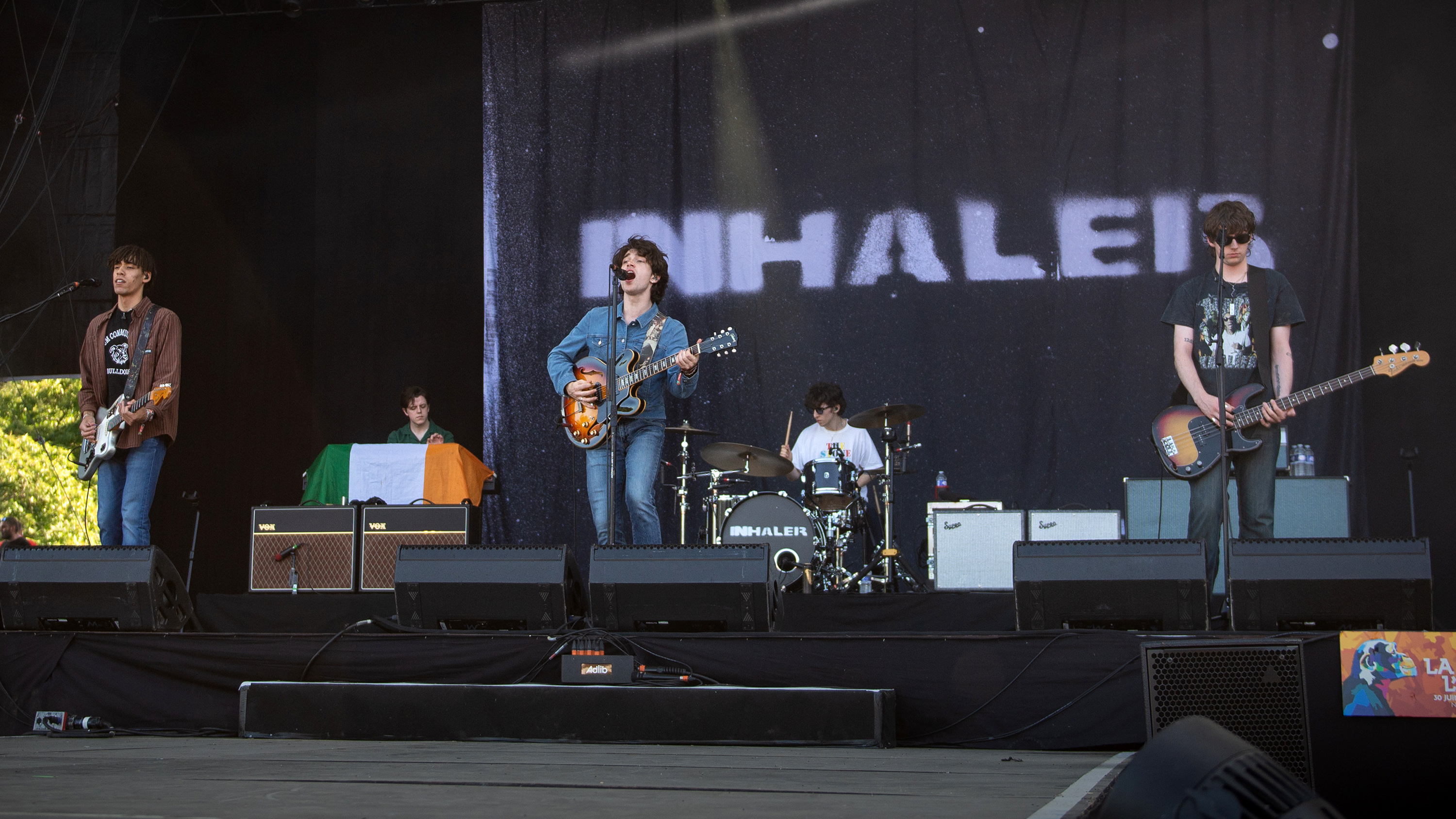
- Inhaler performing in 2022

Background information
- Origin: Dublin, Ireland
- Genres: Alternative rock; indie rock; pop rock
- Years active: 2012–present
- Label: Polydor
- Members: Elijah Hewson; Robert Keating (Bobby Skeetz); Josh Jenkinson; Ryan McMahon
- Website: inhaler.band

Inhaler (stylized as Inhale^{®}) are an Irish rock band originating from Dublin. Formed in 2012, the band consist of vocalist and guitarist Elijah Hewson, bassist Robert Keating, guitarist and keyboardist Josh Jenkinson and drummer Ryan McMahon. Their debut album, It Won't Always Be Like This, was released on 9 July 2021. It entered the Irish & UK Albums Charts at number one, while also entering the top 10 and top 20 album charts in other European countries such as the Netherlands and Germany. The band's second studio album, Cuts & Bruises, was released on 17 February 2023, and their third album, Open Wide, was released on 7 February 2025.

== Career ==
=== 2012–2017: Early years ===
Originally formed in 2012 at St Andrews College in Blackrock, Dublin, the band decided on the name Inhaler in 2015. Jenkinson joined the band right after the band name was decided.

=== 2018–2022: It Won't Always Be Like This ===
The group self-released their debut single "I Want You" in 2017. The single was featured on Garageland Volume 1, released on 14 April 2017. This was later followed by three more singles in 2019, namely "It Won't Always Be Like This", "My Honest Face" and "Ice Cream Sundae". They placed fifth on BBC's annual music poll, Sound of 2020. The group signed with Polydor Records in August 2019. On 21 January 2020, the group released their fourth single, titled "We Have to Move On".

In 2019 Inhaler toured in support of Noel Gallagher's High Flying Birds as their opening act.

On their 2019–2020 tours, the band released a self-titled debut EP featuring the singles "It Won't Always Be Like This", "Oklahoma" (Late Night Version), "My Honest Face" and "There's No Other Place".

For Record Store Day 2020, the band released their singles as limited-edition vinyl records.

The band were one of the winners of the Music Moves Europe Talent Award 2021 and were also shortlisted for the MTV Push UK & Ireland 2021.

On 17 March 2021, the band released a single titled "Cheer Up Baby" and announced that their debut album, It Won't Always Be Like This, would be released on 16 July 2021. On 13 May 2021, the band announced on their social media that the album release would be pushed forward by a week, to be released on 9 July 2021.

The band presented the album live on summer festivals in 2022 (including Glastonbury Festival) and did opening acts for some Kings of Leon shows on their When You See Yourself tour.

=== 2022–2024: Cuts & Bruises ===
The band released their second album Cuts & Bruises on 17 February 2023. It reached number 2 in the United Kingdom album chart and number 1 in the Irish album chart.

The band was selected by Pearl Jam to open their shows in Chicago, Indianapolis, and Austin in Pearl Jam's 2023 concert tour. On 10 June 2023, the band performed at Slane Castle as the opening act for Harry Styles' Love On Tour show. Earlier on in the year they toured with Arctic Monkeys as their opener and also opened for Sam Fender at his St James Park show.

After the release of Cuts & Bruises, Inhaler announced a world tour starting in November 2022 at the Olympia Theatre, Dublin The tour ended on the 11th of November 2023 at the 3Arena after many shows all across the US and Europe. They also played 6 extra London and Glasgow dates before returning home to Dublin. Ryan McMahon posted on his Instagram after the 3Arena tour: "I didn't think we'd ever play this venue let alone play it so soon. Thank you for all of the love you've shown us and our songs on this chaotic journey. Now i'm gonna go and mend my fragile head while I try to figure out what's just happened to this little band of ours."

=== 2024-present: Open Wide ===
After debuting it live during their autumn 2024 tour of America, the band released the song "Your House" on October 29, 2024. Along with the release of the song, the band announced their third album, Open Wide, produced by Kid Harpoon, would be releasing in February 2025. On December 6, 2024, the band released "Open Wide" as the second single from the album. Open Wide’s third single, "A Question Of You", was released on January 17, 2025. Days before the album’s release, the band released "Billy (Yeah Yeah Yeah)" on February 5th, 2025. The album was then released on February 7, 2025. It reached number 1 in the Irish album charts.

The band embarked on their world tour, performing in venues around the world as well as having their biggest headline show to date at Dublin’s St. Anne’s Park. The band concluded their tour at London’s Royal Albert Hall on October 31, 2025, dubbed “Inhalerween” by fans.

== Artistry ==
Hewson named 80s and 90s bands such as the Stone Roses, New Order, Joy Division, Happy Mondays, Depeche Mode, Echo & the Bunnymen, Talking Heads, and Oasis as Inhaler's formative writing influences. Jenkinson in particular was inspired by Kele Okereke of Bloc Party to pursue alternative and rock music.

In 2023, Inhaler called the Strokes an "idol". While recording Cuts & Bruises, the band watched The Beatles: Get Back.

== Members ==
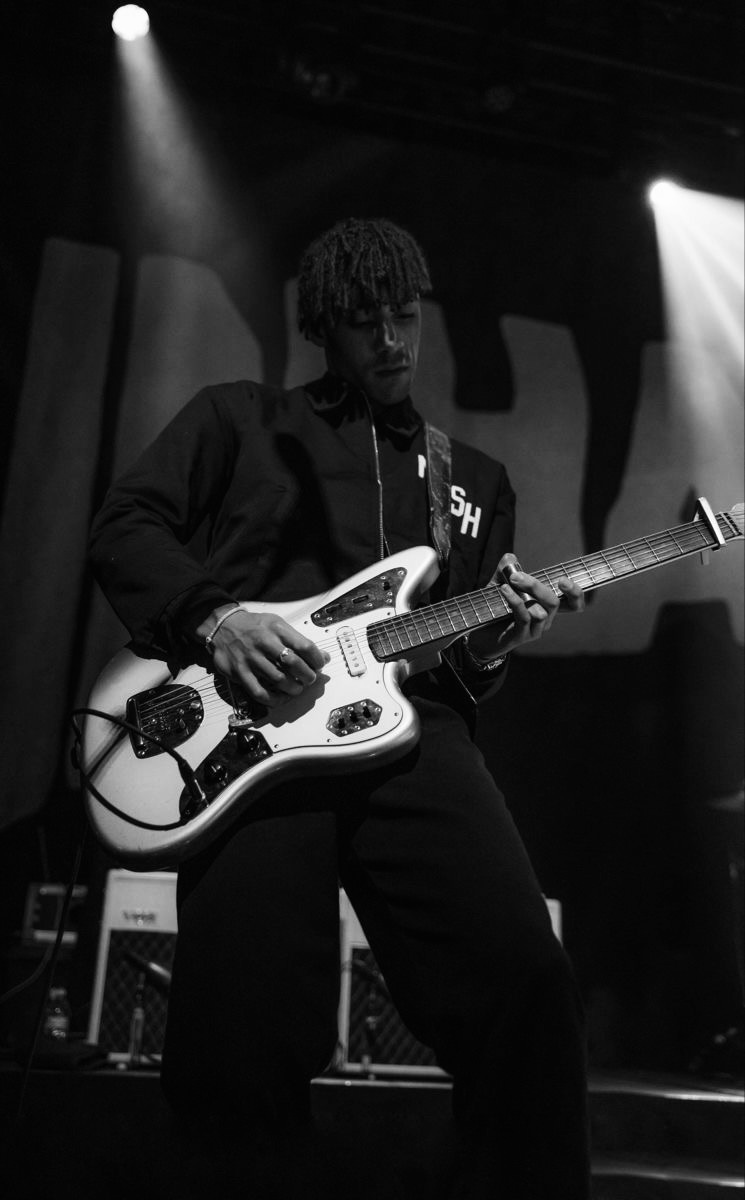
Guitarist Josh Bartholomew Jenkinson

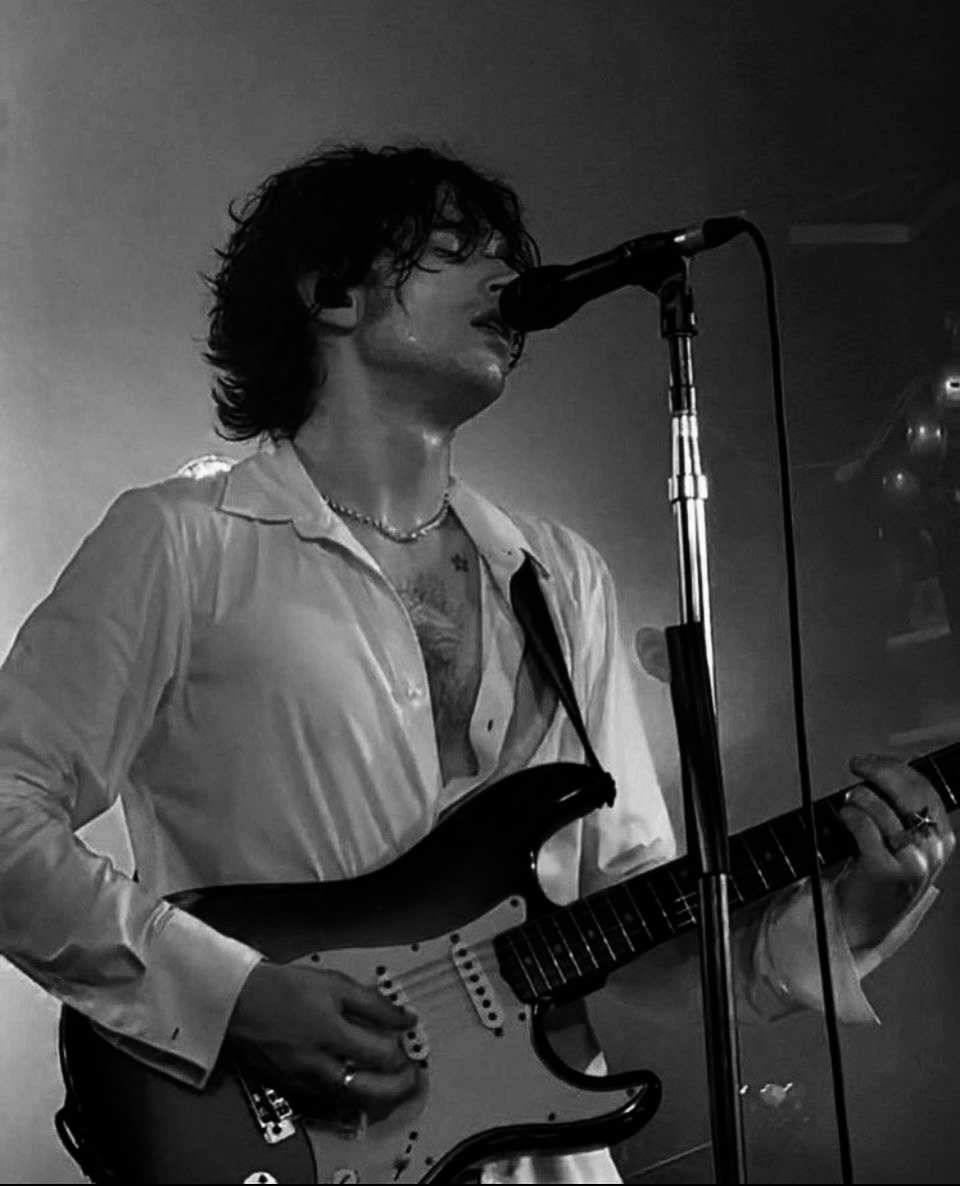
Lead singer Elijah Hewson

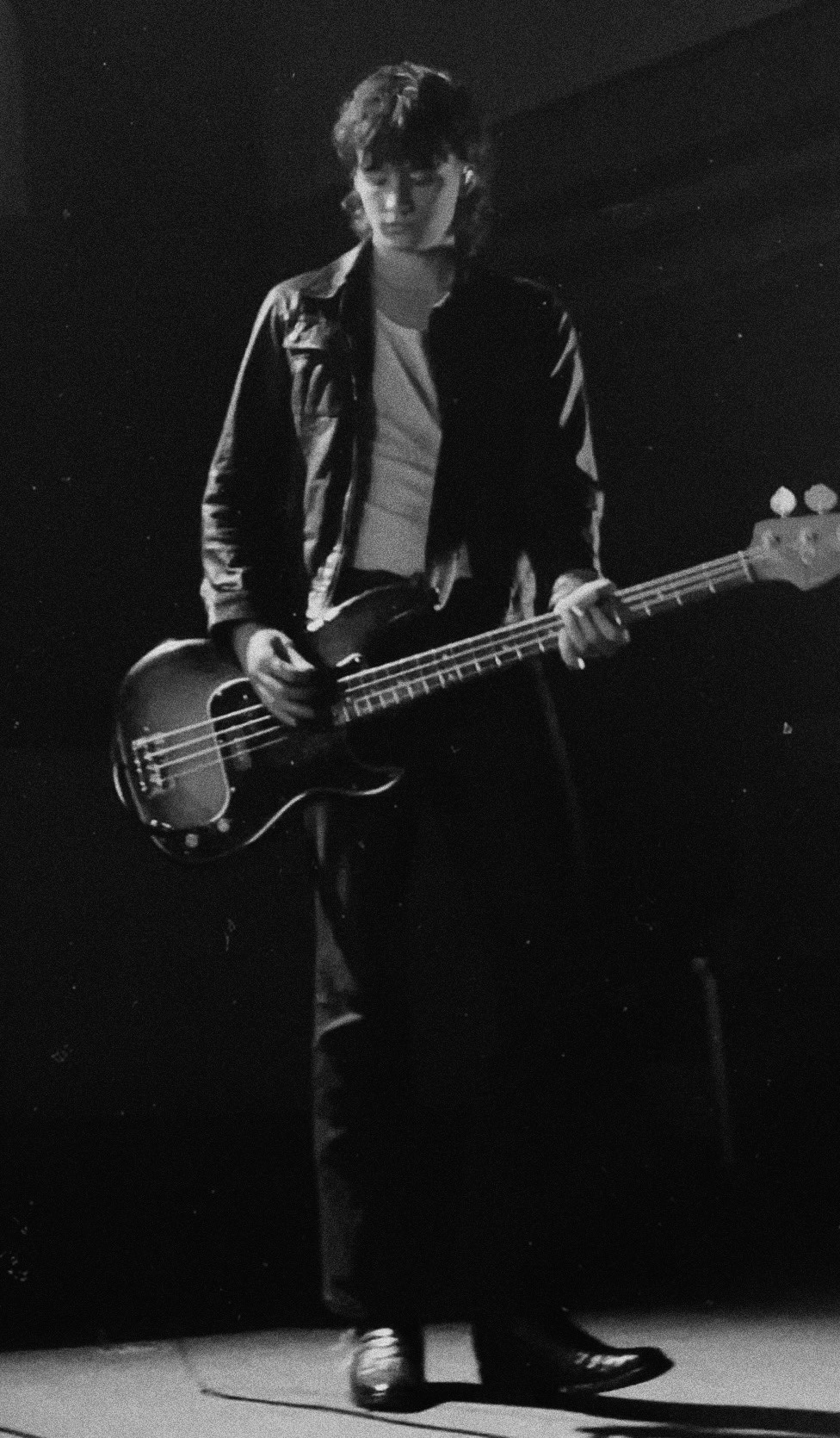
Bassist Robert Keating

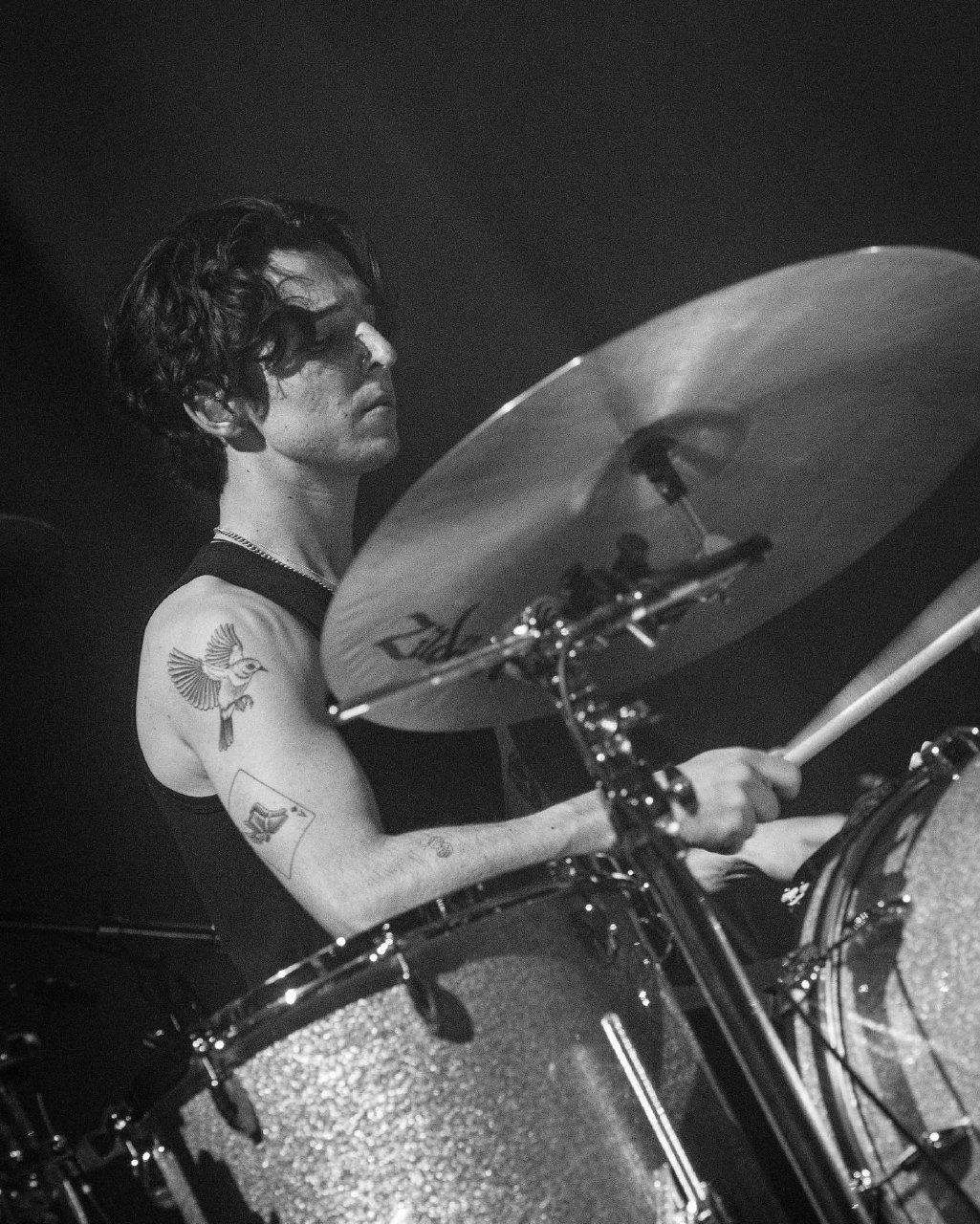
Drummer Ryan McMahon

- Elijah Hewson – lead vocals, guitars, keyboards (2012–present)
- Robert Keating – bass guitar, keyboards, backing vocals (2012–present)
- Ryan McMahon – drums, percussion (2012–present)
- Josh Bartholomew Jenkinson – guitars, keyboards, synthesizers, percussion, backing vocals (2015–present)

Current touring musicians

- Louis Lambert – keyboards, synthesizers (2017–present)

== Discography ==
=== Studio albums ===
Title	Details	Peak chart positions				Certifications
Title	Details	IRE	GER	NLD	UK	Certifications
It Won't Always Be Like This	Released: 9 July 2021; Label: Polydor; Format: Vinyl, CD, digital download, streaming, cassette	1	13	7	1	BPI: Silver
Cuts & Bruises	Released: 17 February 2023; Label: Polydor; Format: Vinyl, CD, digital download, streaming, cassette	1	35	5	2	BPI: Silver
Open Wide	Released: 7 February 2025; Label: Polydor; Format: Vinyl, CD, digital download, streaming, cassette	1	18	8	2	

=== Singles ===
Year	Title	Peak chart positions					Album/EP
Year	Title	BEL (FL) Tip	JPN Over.	US Airplay	US Alt.	US AAA	Album/EP
2018	"I Want You"	—	—	—	—	—	Non-album single
2019	"My Honest Face"	24	—	—	—	—	It Won't Always Be Like This
2019	"It Won't Always Be Like This"	—	—	—	—	—	It Won't Always Be Like This
2019	"Ice Cream Sundae"	15	—	—	—	—	Non-album singles
2020	"We Have to Move On"	37	—	—	—	—	Non-album singles
2020	"Falling In"	—	—	—	—	—	Non-album singles
2020	"When It Breaks"	33	—	—	—	—	It Won't Always Be Like This
2021	"Cheer Up Baby"	13	—	—	33	14	It Won't Always Be Like This
2021	"My Honest Face" (re-release)	—	—	—	—	—	It Won't Always Be Like This
2022	"These Are the Days"	—	—	—	—	15	Cuts & Bruises
2022	"Love Will Get You There"	—	18	—	34	12	Cuts & Bruises
2022	"If You're Gonna Break My Heart"	—	19	—	—	—	Cuts & Bruises
2023	"Just to Keep You Satisfied"	—	—	—	—	17	Cuts & Bruises
2024	"Your House"	—	—	44	34	11	Open Wide
2024	"Open Wide"	—	15	—	—	—	Open Wide
2025	"A Question of You"	—	—	—	—	—	Open Wide
2025	"Billy (Yeah Yeah Yeah)"	—	—	—	—	—	Open Wide
2025	"Hole In The Ground"	—	—	—	—	—	Open Wide

== Awards and nominations ==
Year	Organization	Award	Result	Ref.
2020	NME	The NME 100	Included	
2020	BBC	Sound of 2020	5th	
