= It Won't Always Be Like This =

Studio album by Inhaler
- Released: 9 July 2021
- Recorded: 2020–2021
- Studio: Narcissus Studio, London
- Genre: Indie rock
- Length: 45:13
- Label: Polydor
- Producer: Antony Genn

Inhaler chronology
It Won't Always Be Like This (2021)	Cuts & Bruises (2023)

Singles from It Won't Always Be Like This
- 1. "When It Breaks" Released: 15 October 2020; 2. "Cheer Up Baby" Released: 17 March 2021; 3. "My Honest Face" Released: 15 October 2021

It Won't Always Be Like This is the debut studio album by Irish rock band Inhaler, released on 9 July 2021 through Polydor Records.

== Release and promotion ==
The band had originally planned to begin recording the album in March 2020, however due to the COVID-19 pandemic plans had to be postponed. In March 2021, Inhaler announced the title would be It Won't Always Be Like This and the album was released in July.

To promote the album, Inhaler embarked on a tour of the UK, Europe and North America. It began in the UK in late August 2021, before going to North America in September 2021 and starting their European tour in October 2021 in Dublin and finishing in Lisbon in July 2022.

Inhaler also performed "Cheer Up Baby" on The Late Late Show with James Corden and MTV Rocks Chart with Jack Saunders to promote the album.

== Content ==
The title track, "It Won't Always Be Like This", was one of the first songs the band wrote and although they spent a while on it, the song "kind of formed live" as gigs were the best to gauge a response to the songs the band wrote. The song is the opener for every gig the band does, so they wanted it to also be the opening track on the album. For the album, it was also re-recorded, having been first released as a single in March 2019, with Elijah Hewson saying that they wanted to give it "a bit of a facelift and make it sound like it does now live", as well as "update it and make it sound like the rest of the record".

"My Honest Face" was written in December 2018 and was released as a single in May 2019. "My Honest Face" was also re-recorded for the album. The song "gained massive traction" just as the band started touring and Hewson described it as being about "finding your feet and figuring out what persona you wanted to adopt when you go on stage".

"Slide Out the Window" was one of the first songs the band wrote during the COVID-19 lockdown and is a lot slower than the first two songs on the album. Ryan McMahon said that the song "shows a side of us that we've never really shown before", with Hewson adding that it "really encapsulates just the feeling of lockdown ... [and] hoping that you're someplace else".

"Cheer Up Baby" was released in March 2021, towards the end of lockdown and is an uplifting song that the band have played at every single gig they've done and one that fans had been wanting the band to release as a single for a long time.

"A Night on the Floor" was "kind of the first time we did something a bit kind of psychedelic and trippy" and is about when "everything just seems so negative".

"My King Will Be Kind" was "inspired by people our age who maybe get taken into or just find themselves in extremist groups online".

"When It Breaks" was written at the beginning of lockdown and is a "contrast with the anger and aggression that a lot of people were feeling at the time".

"Who's Your Money On? (Plastic House)" is the longest track on the album and is a mix of a jam that the band and another song that the band had, "Plastic House". The band released the song as a single "out of nowhere" as there hadn't been any prior announcement to its release.

With "Totally", Hewson said that the band ended up "writing music that we weren't really able to play at the time" during lockdown and McMahon added that it was very difficult to write music over Zoom, but when the band went to the recording studio they "became really passionate about [it] early on".

The vocals in "Strange Time to Be Alive" were the chorus of a demo that Robert Keating had been working on and their producer wanted to "make it an interlude" before the final track.

"In My Sleep" was written when the band were able to go to the recording studio during lockdown in 2020, with McMahon describing it as "the first time in years that we'd probably written a song by just jamming it straight up".

== Critical reception ==
Professional ratings
Aggregate scores
Source	Rating
AnyDecentMusic?	6.4/10
Metacritic	69/100
Review scores
Source	Rating
Clash	7/10
DIY	2.5/5 stars
Dork	4/5 stars
Gigwise	7/10
Hot Press	8/10
i	3/5 stars
The Independent	3/5 stars
The Irish Times	3/5 stars
The Line of Best Fit	7/10
NME	4/5 stars

The album was overall met with positive reviews. The review aggregator Metacritic has a rating of 70 out of 100, based on 7 reviews.

Reviewing for Clash, Robin Murray wrote that the album "distils an optimism we can just about taste, but can’t quite feel. The sound of a band coming into their own, it finds Inhaler taking a deep breath, and making the most important step forwards of their career". Charlie Brock for Gigwise thought "they lack the cutting edge like Fontaines D.C. or The Murder Capital, but Inhaler have brought together a really listenable, enjoyable debut in It Won't Always Be Like This nevertheless".

Roisin O'Connor for The Independent wrote that "it’s easy for critics and fellow artists to resent a band like Inhaler, with their famous parents, near-instant signing to a major label, and early tours supporting Noel Gallagher. But beneath the on-sleeve influences are poignant themes of ennui, anxiety and yearning. Inhaler want to be adored. With a debut like this, they probably will be." Ella Kemp for NME wrote that the "rousing debut album is the triumphant completion of a journey years in the making" and that "Hewson is clearly pushing himself to do so much more than just make his dad proud".

Lana Williams for The Life of Best Fit lauded the album, writing that it "offers an impeccable blend of nostalgia inducing guitar riffs and emotive narratives that make for a spectacular debut album. Promising and full of potential, the boys have delivered and exceeded expectations, it’s safe to say that their intoxicating indie rock cuts are here to stay".

== Track listing ==
All tracks are written by Elijah Hewson, Josh Jenkinson, Robert Keating and Ryan McMahon, except where noted.

No.	Title	Writer(s)	Length
1.	"It Won't Always Be Like This"		4:04
2.	"My Honest Face"		4:32
3.	"Slide Out the Window"		4:35
4.	"Cheer Up Baby"		3:53
5.	"A Night on the Floor"		4:02
6.	"My King Will Be Kind"		4:52
7.	"When It Breaks"	Hewson; Jenkinson; Keating; McMahon; Antony Genn	3:42
8.	"Who’s Your Money On? (Plastic House)"	Hewson; Jenkinson; Keating; McMahon; Genn	6:22
9.	"Totally"	Hewson; Jenkinson; Keating; McMahon; Genn	3:56
10.	"Strange Time to Be Alive"		1:04
11.	"In My Sleep"		4:11
Total length:			45:13

Japanese edition bonus track
No.	Title	Length
12.	"When I'm with You"	4:03
Total length:		49:27

== Personnel ==
Credits adapted from the album's liner notes.

Inhaler

- Elijah Hewson – vocals, electric guitar, acoustic guitar, keyboards, piano, drum programming, handclaps
- Josh Jenkinson – backing vocals, electric guitar, acoustic guitar, keyboards, percussion, handclaps
- Robert Keating – backing vocals, bass guitar, keyboards, piano, handclaps
- Ryan McMahon – drums, dustbin lids, handclaps

Additional musicians

- Martin Slattery – piano (8)
- Andrea Cozzaglio – additional piano (5)
- Antony Genn – percussion, keyboards, drum machine

Technical

- Antony Genn – producer, artwork
- Drew Dungate-Smith – engineer
- Andrea Cozzaglio – assistant engineer, additional recording
- Tom Herbert – additional recording (9)
- John Catlin – mixing
- John Davis – mastering
- Inhaler – artwork
- Douglas Hart – artwork
- Richard Andrews – layout, additional design
- Lillie Eiger – cover photography
- Lewis Evans – all other photography

== Charts ==
Chart performance for It Won't Always Be Like This
Chart (2021)	Peak position
Austrian Albums (Ö3 Austria)	74
Belgian Albums (Ultratop Flanders)	6
Belgian Albums (Ultratop Wallonia)	8
Dutch Albums (Album Top 100)	7
German Albums (Offizielle Top 100)	13
Irish Albums (OCC)	1
Scottish Albums (OCC)	1
Swiss Albums (Schweizer Hitparade)	34
UK Albums (OCC)	1
US Heatseekers Albums (Billboard)	8

== Certifications ==
Region	Certification	Certified units/sales
United Kingdom (BPI)	Silver	60,000^{‡}
^{‡} Sales+streaming figures based on certification alone.
