= Cliff Taylor (journalist) =

Managing editor of The Irish Times

Cliff Taylor is the managing editor of The Irish Times, where he has "a lead writing role with the newspaper and on digital platforms in areas ranging from business to politics."

Between 2004 and 2014 Taylor was editor of The Sunday Business Post, a Sunday newspaper based in Ireland. He replaced Ted Harding, shortly after the takeover by Thomas Crosbie Holdings. Taylor previously held the position of Economics Editor of The Irish Times where he spent 17 years.

The Sunday Business Post chief executive Fiachra O'Riordan said, “We chose Cliff Taylor because of his outstanding journalistic ability in business, economics and general news”.

Taylor was educated at St Andrew's College, Dublin and Trinity College, Dublin, and lives in Malahide with his two children, Colin and Neil, and his wife, Elizabeth.
