= Enda O'Coineen =

Irish offshore sailor and navigator

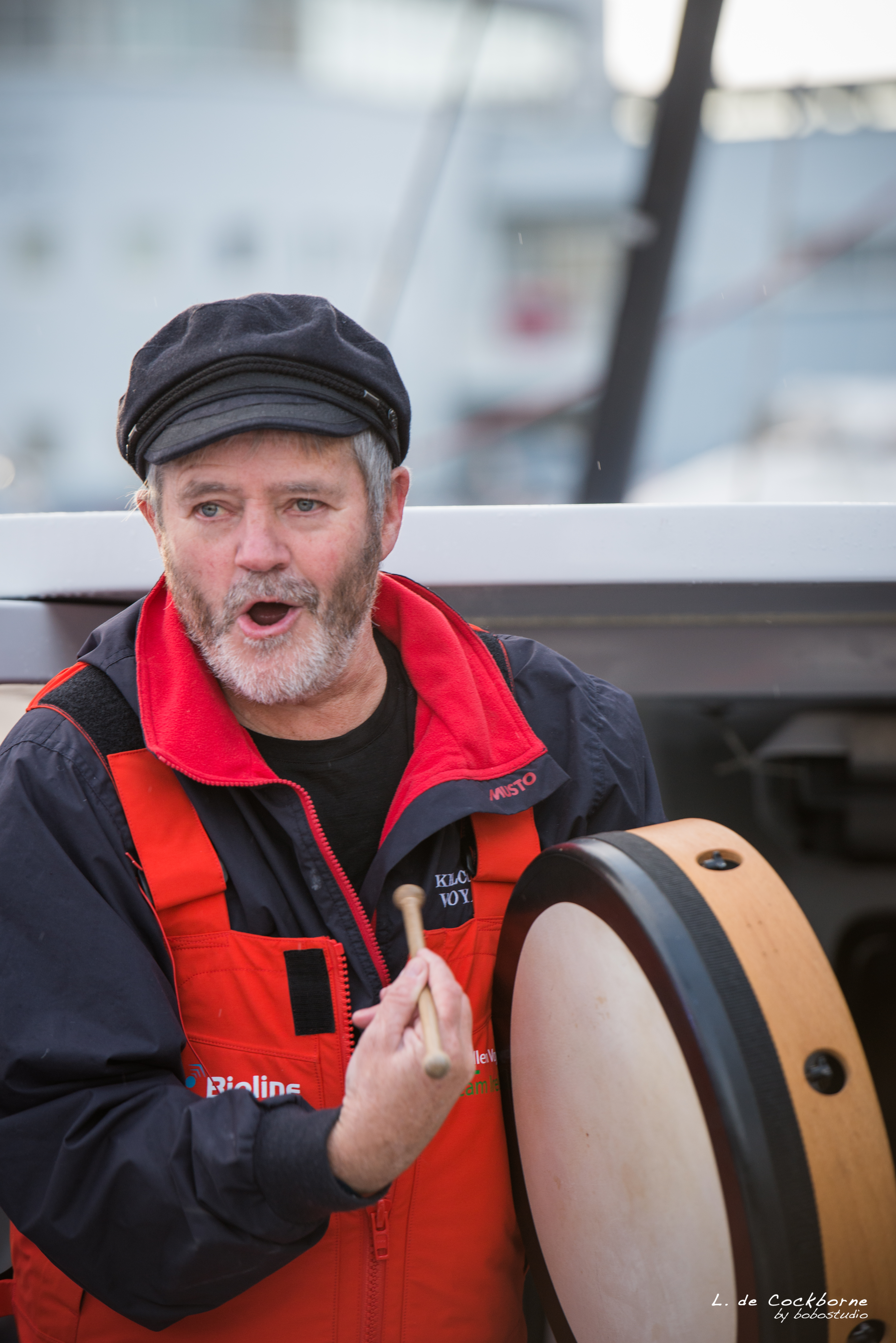

Personal information
- Nationality: Irish
- Born: 15 October 1955 (age 70)

Sailing career
- Sport: Sailing
- Club: Royal Irish Yacht Club
- Class: Galway

Enda O'Coineen (born 15 October 1955 in Galway), is an Irish businessman, sailor, navigator and skipper.

== Life ==
His great-grandfather participated in the Klondike Gold Rush before returning to Ireland as a publican.

In 2013, he helped found the Atlantic Youth Trust, a young sailing charity in Ireland. He is chair of the charity.

In 2017, his net worth was reported as 49 million euros. O'Coineen purchased the Business Post, a Sunday newspaper in Ireland in September 2018. The purchase was managed through the ownership of his company, Kilcullen Kapital Partners.

In 2019, he published a memoir entitled Close To The Edge.

In 2020, it was reported that he owned 90% of Dun Aengus, an investment vehicle.

O'Coineen is married to Nicola Mitchell, the chief executive of Life Scientific, an agrochemicals company. In September 2022, it was announced that the couple had separated and he was suing his wife in the High Court of Ireland.

== Sailing ==
In 1985, he attempted to cross the Atlantic Ocean but capsized and was late rescued by a NATO warship.

=== Vendée Globe ===
He acquired Mike Goling IMOCA 60 and renamed it "Kilcullen Voyager - Team Ireland". He was the first Irishman to enter the Vendee Globe when he participated in the 2016-2017 Vendée Globe he broke the mast near New Zealand and had to retire.

In early 2018, Enda O'Coineen decided to finish the planned trip of the Vendée Globe on the Imoca "The Breath of the North for The Imagine Project" belonging to Thomas Ruyant. He finished this journey on 1 April 2018, arriving in Sables d'Olonne.

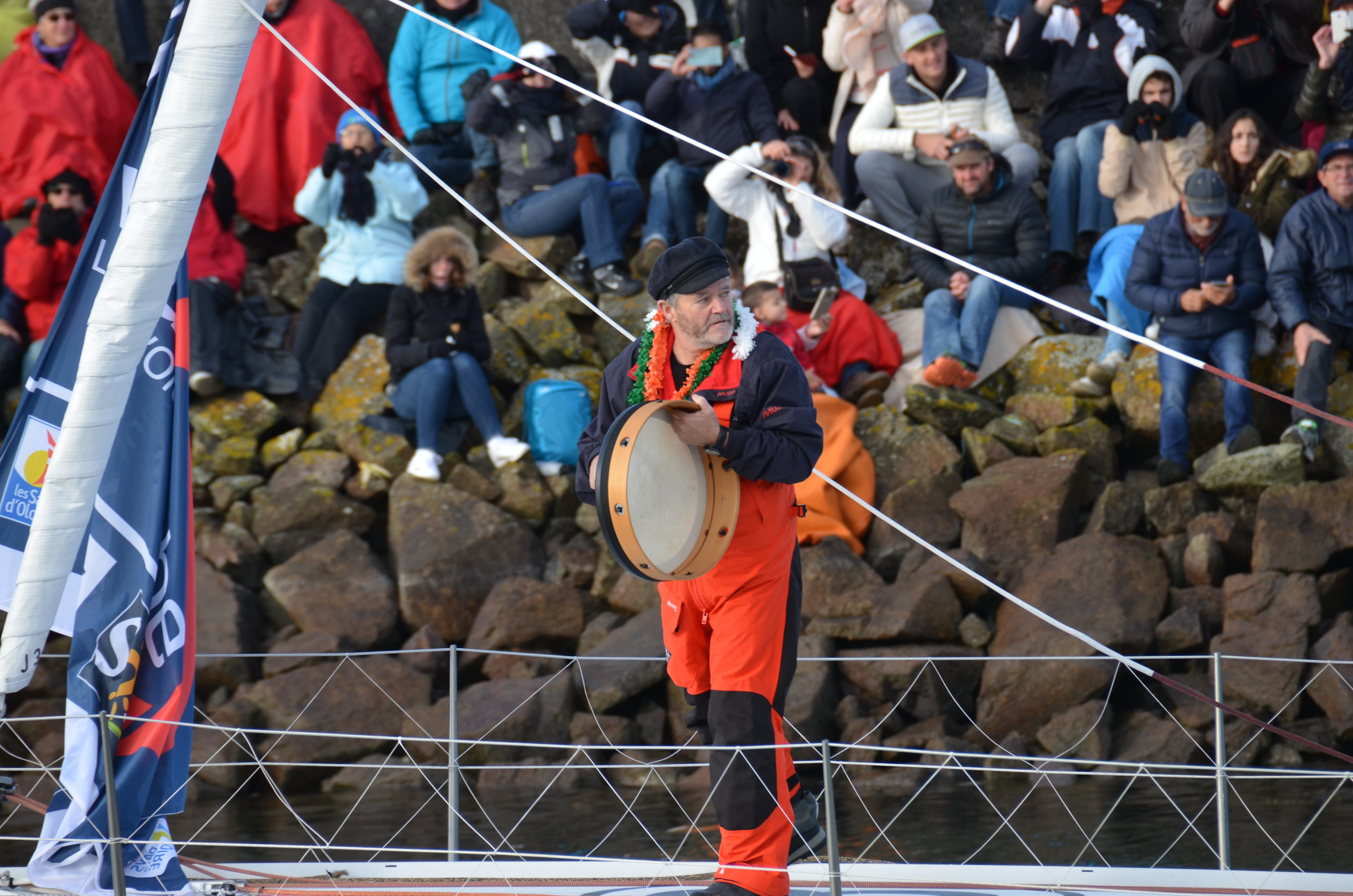
Departure of the 2016-2017 Vendée Globe

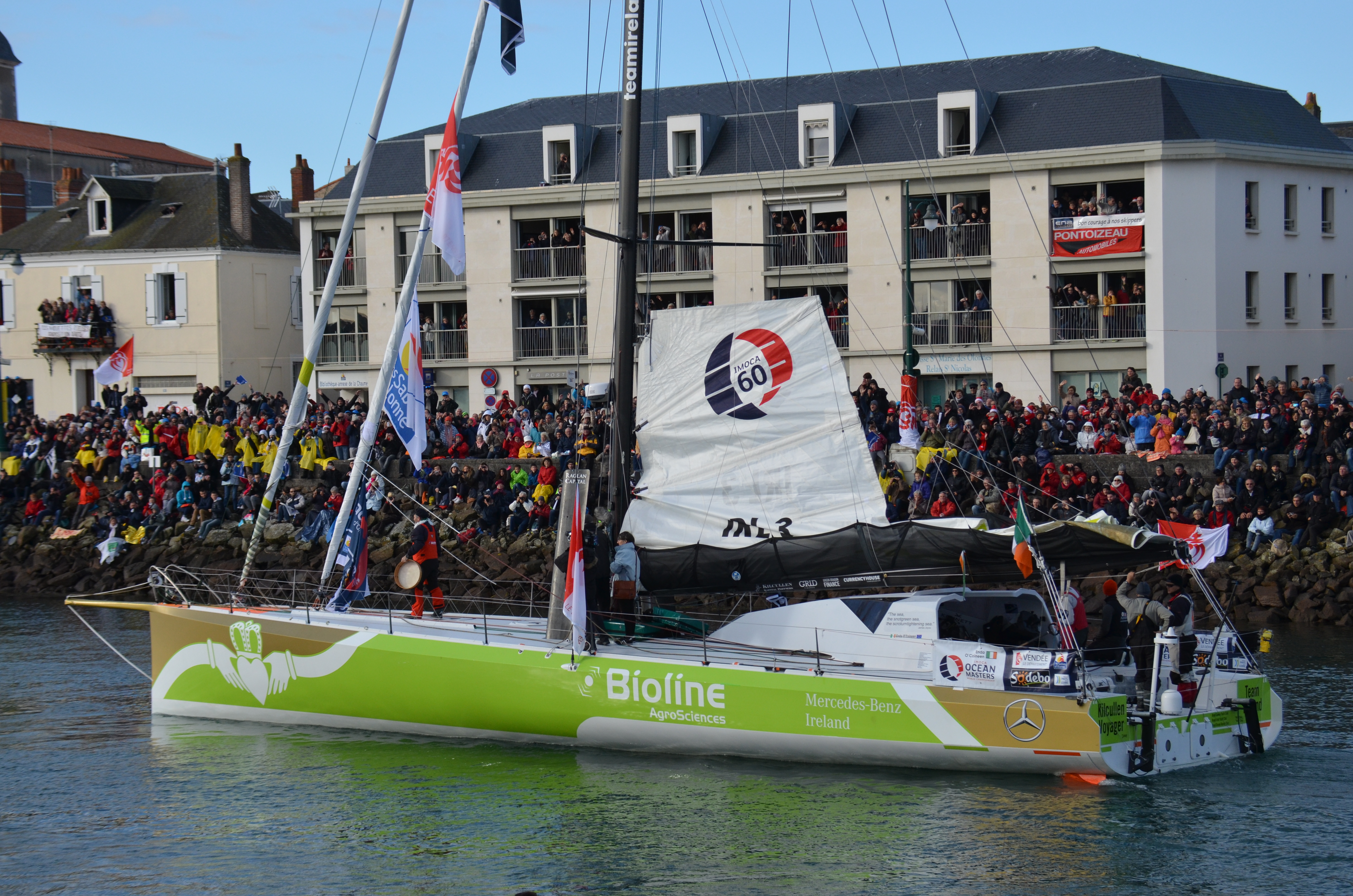
Departure of the 2016-2017 Vendée Globe

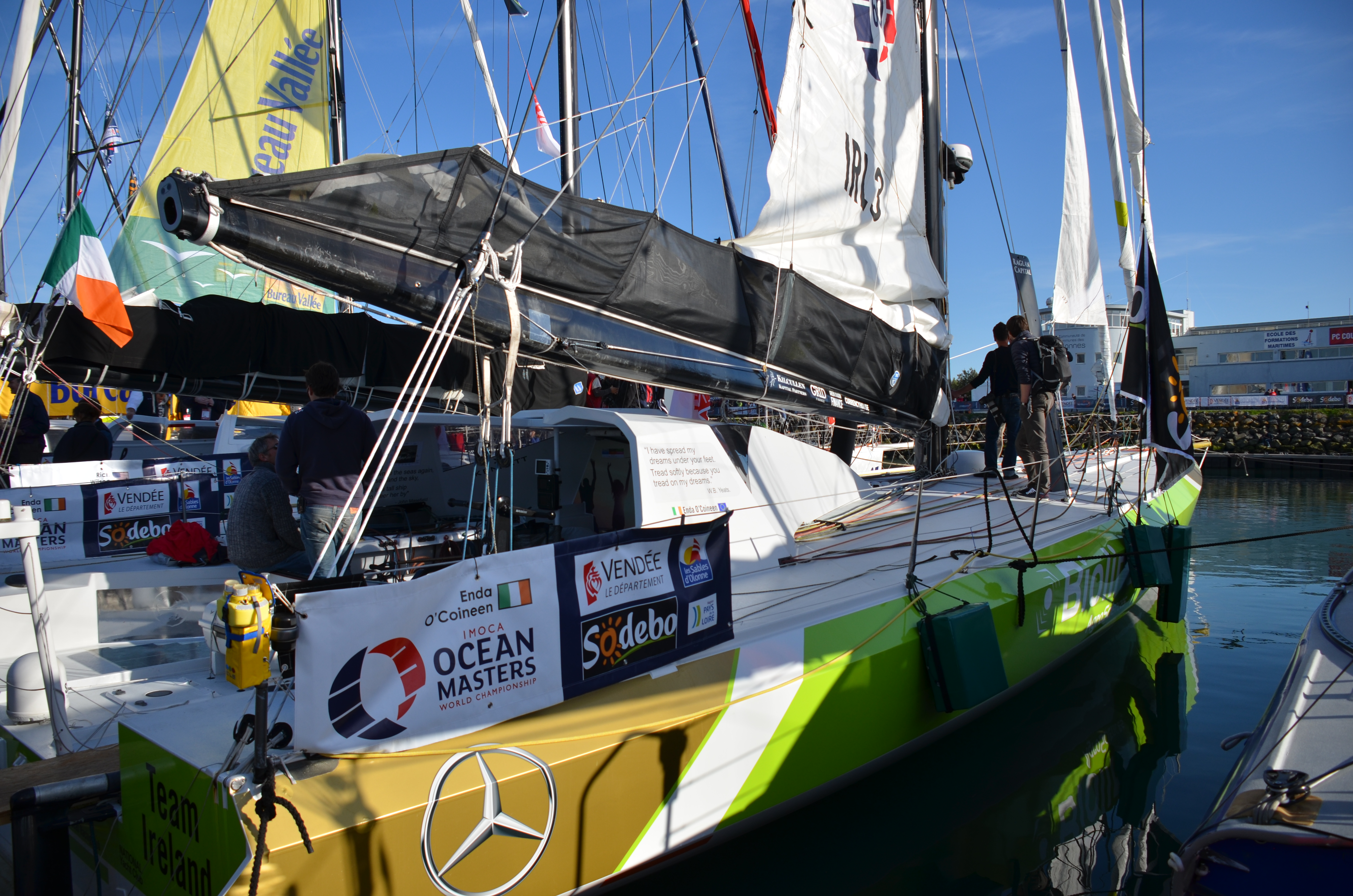
Kilcullen Voyager - Team Ireland

== Sailing highlights ==
- 2015: 3rd in the Transat St Barth
- 2015: 8th in the Rolex Fastnet Race
- 2016-2017: Vendée Globe participant.
