= Elijah Hewson =

Irish musician (born 1999)

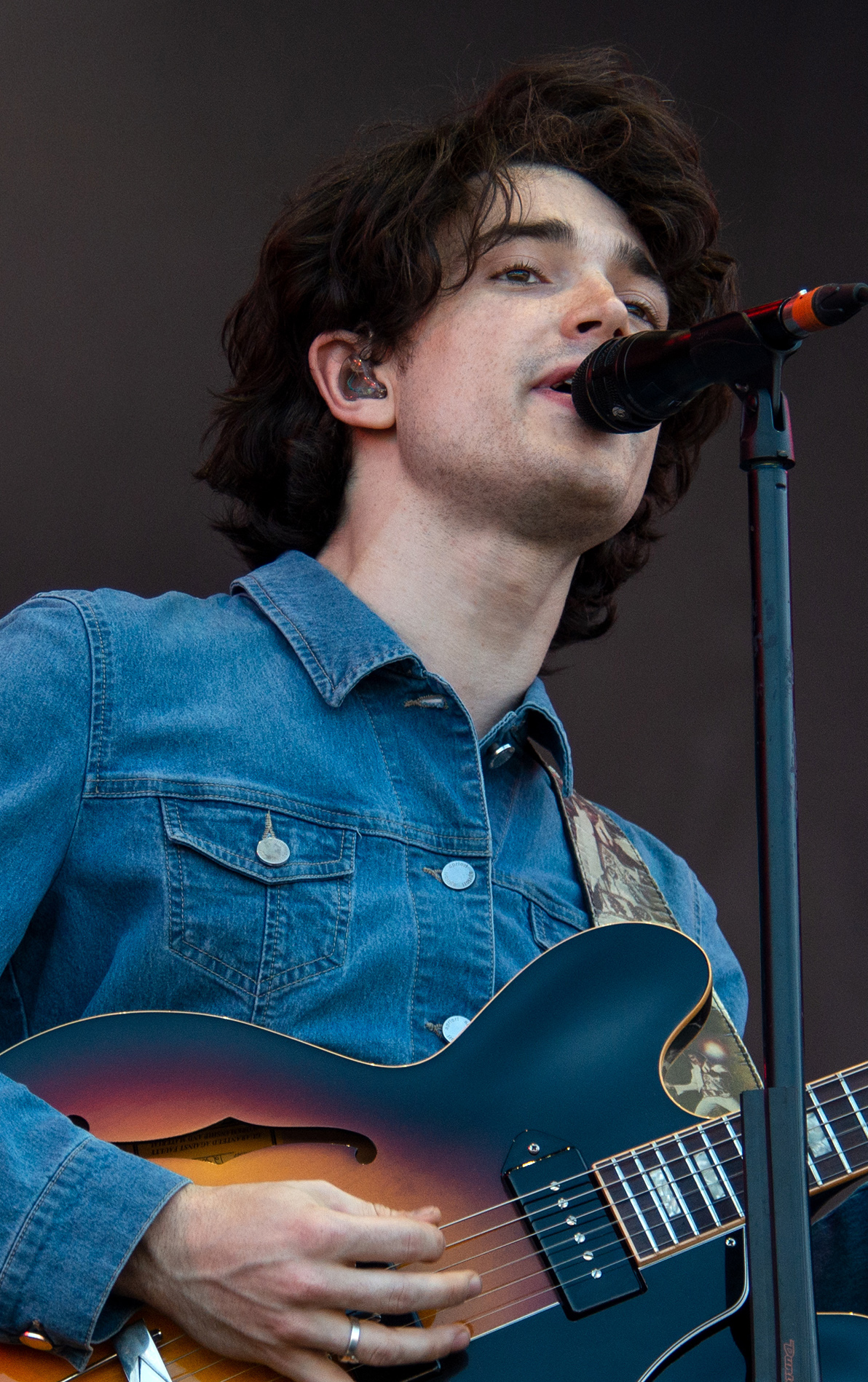
- Hewson performing in 2022
- Born: Elijah Bob Patricius Guggi Q Hewson; 17 August 1999 (age 26); Dublin, Ireland
- Parents: Bono (father); Ali Hewson (mother)
- Relatives: Eve Hewson (sister)
- Musical career
- Genres: Alternative rock; indie rock; pop rock
- Occupations: Musician; singer; songwriter
- Instruments: Vocals; guitar; keyboards
- Years active: 2016–present
- Member of: Inhaler

Elijah Bob Patricius Guggi Q Hewson (born 17 August 1999) is an Irish rock musician. Born to U2 frontman Bono and activist Ali Hewson in Dublin, he grew up in Killiney and featured on the cover of U2's Songs of Experience in 2017. He formed Inhaler in late 2012 with bassist Robert Keating and drummer Ryan McMahon, from St Andrew's College, Dublin, with fourth member and guitarist Josh Jenkinson joining later, and released the albums It Won't Always Be Like This (2021), Cuts and Bruises (2023) and Open Wide (2025) as part of the band. His unusual name, for which his father was mocked in the press, is a result of Bono's Christianity and incorporates the names of Guggi and Quincy Jones.

== Life and career ==
Elijah Bob Patricius Guggi Q Hewson was born in Dublin on 17 August 1999 to Bono, the lead singer of U2, and Ali Hewson, an activist. He has two older sisters, Jordan Joy Hewson and Memphis Eve Sunny Day Iris Hewson, and a younger brother, John Abraham Hewson. Elijah was raised as a Christian and lived at Temple Hill in Killiney, which his parents had moved into in the late 1980s. He attended Dalkey School Project and St Andrew's College, Dublin.

At age 13, he took up the guitar after playing the video game Guitar Hero, three years after discovering that his father was famous. In late 2012, while at St Andrew's College, he met Robert Keating and Ryan McMahon and formed a band with them and a vocalist under the name "The Collapsible Chairs". The band had bonded over a love of Arctic Monkeys and Nirvana, while Hewson became its lead singer when he was fourteen or fifteen after its original singer left after his vocals were found to be substandard. They later earned the sobriquet "The Inhalers" after the medical device of the same name due to Hewson's asthma and adopted the moniker Inhaler in February 2015. Around this time, Josh Jenkinson joined the band after Hewson played him "I Wanna Be Adored" by The Stone Roses at a party. In December 2017, a photograph taken by Anton Corbijn of Elijah holding hands with Sian Evans, the daughter of U2's the Edge, appeared on the cover of Songs of Experience, U2's fourteenth album.

After graduating with a Leaving Certificate, Inhaler took a year out to play music with the intention of going to college afterwards if they were not successful. Hewson's parents made a point of not assisting further than necessary; in an interview with Craig McLean of the Evening Standard in January 2023, he noted that after his Airbnb was cancelled on the band's first trip to London and he asked his mother to provide a hotel, he found himself instructed to sleep "on a park bench". A friend later allowed him the use of a couch to sleep on. Inhaler later had a No. 1 album on the UK Albums Chart with It Won't Always Be Like This in July 2021 and No. 2 albums with Cuts & Bruises in March 2023 and Open Wide in February 2025.

== Artistry and personal life ==
Hewson takes inspiration from grunge, having been obsessed with the genre as a child. Reviewing Inhaler in December 2019, BBC Culture remarked that Hewson's voice was "like you've got back in time, 40 years to witness [U2]'s first faltering steps in a sweaty, smoky Dublin club" [sic], and while reviewing It Won't Always Be Like This for The Daily Telegraph, Neil McCormick found Hewson's "raw tone" reminiscent of Bono's, but with "a loose, understated fluidity to his melodies that is very pop contemporary".

Hewson's first name is a result of the Christianity of his father. His other middle names make reference to Guggi, a member of the Virgin Prunes, and Quincy Jones, a long-time friend of his father. Bono's naming decision, which took him a week to make and two further weeks to announce, earned him mockery in the press, with John Walsh of The Independent wondering what he was thinking and Euan Ferguson of The Observer suggesting that he should be ashamed of himself. In 2023, it was reported that Elijah was dating Grace Burns, the daughter of Christy Turlington and Edward Burns.

== Family tree ==
Hewson family tree

Brendan Robert; Hewson
Norman; Hewson
Jordan Joy; Stillwater Iris; Hewson

Iris Elizabeth; Rankin
Paul David; Hewson
Memphis Eve; Sunny Day; Iris Hewson

Terry; Stewart
Ian; Stewart
Elijah Bob; Patricius Guggi; Q Hewson

Joy Stewart
Alison Stewart
John Abraham Hewson
