= Irish Newspaper Archives =

Commercial online database of digitised Irish newspapers

The Irish Newspaper Archives (INA) is a commercial online database of digitised Irish newspapers, and is the largest collection of Irish newspapers archives in the world. It is also said to be the world's oldest archive of Irish newspapers.

Subscription-free access to the archive is available to users in Irish public libraries, universities and schools. Annual membership for the 12-month Gold-membership costs €169.00. The 1-month Gold-membership costs €18.25 per month to a total of €219.00 annually, as of 2025.

== History ==
The Irish Newspaper Archives originated in the 1960s, when Alan Martin founded National Micro Publishing, a company that provided microfilming services for newspaper publishers and libraries throughout Ireland.

In the early 21st century, the business was expanded and digitised, resulting in the creation of the Irish Newspaper Archives online platform. Between 2001 and 2003, the company was established as a subsidiary of National Micro Media Ltd. by Andrew Martin alongside his family. Irish Newspaper Archive Ltd. remains an independent, family-run enterprise managed by Alan Martin’s sons, Andrew and Jonathan, and their mother, Annette as well as Phillip Martin. The archive continues to grow since its launch in 2009, with current newspapers updated weekly and historical issues added on an ongoing basis.

== Collections ==
The collection of newspaper issues spans the period from 1738 to the present day, encompassing more than 250 years of daily publications printed and distributed throughout Ireland and abroad. It includes around 260 different Irish newspaper outlets.

As of 2025, Irish Newspaper Archives announced significant expansions and updates to its collection, adding newly digitised titles such as The Monaghan Argus (1949–1970), Mayo Examiner (1868–1876), Roscommon Champion (1944–2010), Roscommon and Leitrim Gazette (1822–1882), Roscommon Journal (1828–1927) and updating major runs including the Roscommon Messenger, Argus (Louth), Belfast Telegraph, The Bray People, and The Corkman through 2025.
