= Kevin Kelly (publisher) =

Irish publisher and editor

Kevin Kelly (born c. 1937), is an Irish publisher and editor who has created magazines in England, America and Ireland. Born in County Londonderry, he is married to Rose with whom he set up Image magazine in 1975. Among his best-known titles is World of Interiors, which he established in 1981 with Min Hogg as editor. Condé Nast later bought the publication from Kelly. In 1987 Condé Nast and the Financial Times financed the creation of the monthly BUSINESS magazine, which won a PPA Business Magazine of the year award. Kelly held a 20% stake in the title, while the remaining 80% was divided between Condé Nast and the Financial Times. The magazine was last published in 1991.

In 1990 Kelly produced a British edition of W at the request of John Fairchild. Departures was a title that Kelly created and published for American Express Black cardholders. While living in America in the 90s, Kelly launched World of Hibernia, The up-market publication was created in 1997 with Kelly as publisher and editor-in-chief and Thomas Farley as editor. It covered various topics of interest to the Irish diaspora in America. The publication folded in 2002

Kelly owns ESM (European Supermarket Magazine), Checkout magazine and created the Irish women's glossy, Image and its sister title, Image Interiors.

== Publications ==
- Checkout - Kelly bought it in 1973
- Irish Business Magazine - Monthly magazine launched in 1974
- Image - Launched in 1975
- World of Interiors - launched in 1981
- BUSINESS - monthly magazine launched in 1987
- Food and Wine - founded by Kelly, sold in 2001 to Smurfit Communications
- Vision - short lived European publication by Kelly and Smurfit
- Cara - Image Publications produced Cara inflight magazine for Aer Lingus
