= St Andrew's College, Dublin =

Private secondary school in Blackrock, Dublin, Ireland

Saint Andrew's College
- Coláiste Naomh Aindriú

Location
- Booterstown Avenue, Booterstown, Dún Laoghaire–Rathdown; Ireland; 53.305416°N 6.201476°W

Information
- Type: Independent; Fee-paying independent School
- Motto: Ardens Sed Virens (Latin for 'Burning Yet Flourishing')
- Religious affiliations: Presbyterian and Interdenominational
- Established: 1894
- Principal: Louise Marshall
- Staff: 200+
- Gender: Co-educational
- Age: 4 to 19
- Enrollment: Junior School: 265; Senior School: 1000+ (2011/2012)
- Language: English
- Colours: Navy Blue and White
- School fees: €9,100
- Website: sac.ie

St. Andrew's College Dublin (Irish: Coláiste Naomh Aindriú) is a co-educational, inter-denominational, international private day school, founded in 1894 by members of the Presbyterian community, and now located in Booterstown, Dún Laoghaire–Rathdown, Ireland. The school colours are blue and white.

== History ==
=== Foundation ===
Founded as a boys' secondary school at the end of the 19th century by members of the Presbyterian community, St Andrew's College celebrated its centenary in 1994. It was on 8 January 1894 that the College opened its doors at 21 St Stephen's Green in the centre of Dublin. This was to be the first of its three locations. The school grew rapidly from its original intake of 69 students. By the end of 1894 there were 203 boys in the school.

=== Wellington Place ===
At the beginning of 1937 a move to new premises in Wellington Place, Clyde Road, along with a determined effort by past pupils and parents to stave off closure or amalgamation saw a revival in the fortunes of the College. In 1973, the school became co-educational and moved to a new site in Booterstown.

== Structure ==
St Andrew's College has both a primary and secondary school. The secondary school offers both the Leaving Certificate (Ireland) and the International Baccalaureate programme.

=== Accreditations ===
Since 1984, St Andrew's is the only school in Ireland fully accredited by both the European Council of International Schools and the New England Association of Schools and Colleges.

=== International Baccalaureate ===
St Andrew's is one of three schools in Ireland to offer the International Baccalaureate (IB) Diploma Programme. A small number (usually around 70) of the school's students are in the IB programme.

=== Model United Nations ===
St Andrew's organises St Andrew's Model United Nations (SAIMUN). It is run over the first week in Easter in the Royal Marine Hotel in Dun Laoghaire.

== Sport ==
The school's sports facilities consist of two hockey pitches, one rugby pitch, two hard tennis courts, 8 lawn tennis courts, an outdoor basketball court, an indoor sports hall and a fitness centre. The major winter sports are rugby, basketball and hockey; the major summer sports are tennis, athletics and cricket along with an inter year annual football competition which runs through the summer term. St. Andrew's College won the Leinster Schools Rugby Senior Cup in 1906, 1911,1921-22.

They also have had immense success in the All Ireland Schoolboys' Hockey Championship, having won the tournament 7 times, most recently in 2017.

== Notable former pupils ==
- Leigh Arnold, actress
- Andrew Balbirnie, cricketer
- Wallace Benn, suffragan Bishop of Lewes (1997–2012)
- Shane Berkery, contemporary artist
- Ben Briscoe, former Fianna Fáil TD and Lord Mayor of Dublin
- Robert Briscoe, first Jewish Teachta Dála (TD) and founding member of Fianna Fáil who also served as Lord Mayor of Dublin
- Peter Bracken, Irish rugby player
- Jammie Clinch, Ireland and Lions rugby player
- Dick Collopy, Ireland rugby player
- Gerald Davis, artist
- Ronnie Dawson, Ireland and Lions (Captain 1956) rugby player
- Maurice E. Dockrell, Fine Gael TD
- E. R. Dodds, classical scholar
- Tom Dreaper, racehorse trainer
- Neil Farrugia, professional footballer
- Zlata Filipović, Bosnian writer
- Charles Franklin, Irish-American (naturalised U.S. citizen) motorcycle racer-engineer. He enrolled in 1894, the year the college was founded
- Ruth Gilligan, writer and actress
- Michael Gibson, Ireland, The Barbarians & Leinster rugby player
- David Grene, scholar of Greek classics
- John Allman Hemingway, DFC, AEc, RAF fighter pilot (Battle of Dunkirk; Battle of Britain)
- Ruth Kearney, actress
- Neville Keery, Senate member and poet
- Eve Hewson, actress
- Elijah Hewson, lead singer of Inhaler
- Josh Jenkinson, lead guitarist of Inhaler
- Robert Keating (bobby skeetz), bassist of Inhaler (band)
- Ryan McMahon, drummer of Inhaler
- Hector Hughes, Scottish MP
- Herbert Carmichael Irwin, aviator and athlete
- Denis Johnston, writer
- Felix Jones, Ireland rugby union international
- Christopher Juul-Jensen, professional cyclist
- Jordan Larmour, Leinster & Ireland rugby player
- Alan Lewis, Ireland cricketer and rugby union referee
- Ian Lewis, Irish international cricketer
- Derek McCleane, 800m Olympian
- Katie McGrath, actress
- Alfred Monahan, Bishop of Monmouth (1940-1945)
- David Norris, independent member of Seanad Éireann
- General Sir Frederick Pile, GCB, DSO, MC
- Gillian Pinder, Ireland women's field hockey international and silver medallist at the 2018 Women's Hockey World Cup
- Andrew Porter, rugby player for Leinster & Ireland
- Herbert Rollins, cricketer
- Robbie Ryan, cinematographer
- Bethel Solomons, Ireland rugby player, president of the Royal College of Physicians of Ireland, master of the Rotunda Hospital, supporter of the 1916 Rising; mentioned in Finnegans Wake
- Molly Sterling, singer-songwriter
- Peter Sullivan, Connacht rugby player
- John Lighton Synge, mathematician and physicist
- Cliff Taylor, Editor, Sunday Business Post
- Chloe Watkins, Ireland women's field hockey international and silver medallist at the 2018 Women's Hockey World Cup
- Trevor Williams, Bishop of Limerick and Killaloe
- Juanita Wilson, director
