= Antony Genn =

British musician formerly in Pulp (born 1971)

Antony Genn (born 1971 in Sheffield, England) is a British musician and composer.

Genn got his start as a 16-year-old playing bass for Pulp for seven months in 1988. He toured with Elastica in 1995-96, playing keyboards. He was one of the original members of Joe Strummer and the Mescaleros, co-writing, producing, and playing guitar for their first album Rock Art and the X-Ray Style. He went on to co-write and record on a number of songs with Robbie Williams, UNKLE, Josh Homme, Brian Eno, Ian Brown from The Stone Roses, Scott "Walker" Engel, Jarvis Cocker, Inhaler, Lee Hazlewood and others. In 2004, Genn, together with Martin Slattery founded The Hours. The pair previously worked together as part of the Mescaleros. In recent years, Genn has been involved in writing and producing scores for film and television.
