= IMOCA 60 PRB 3 =

Sailboat

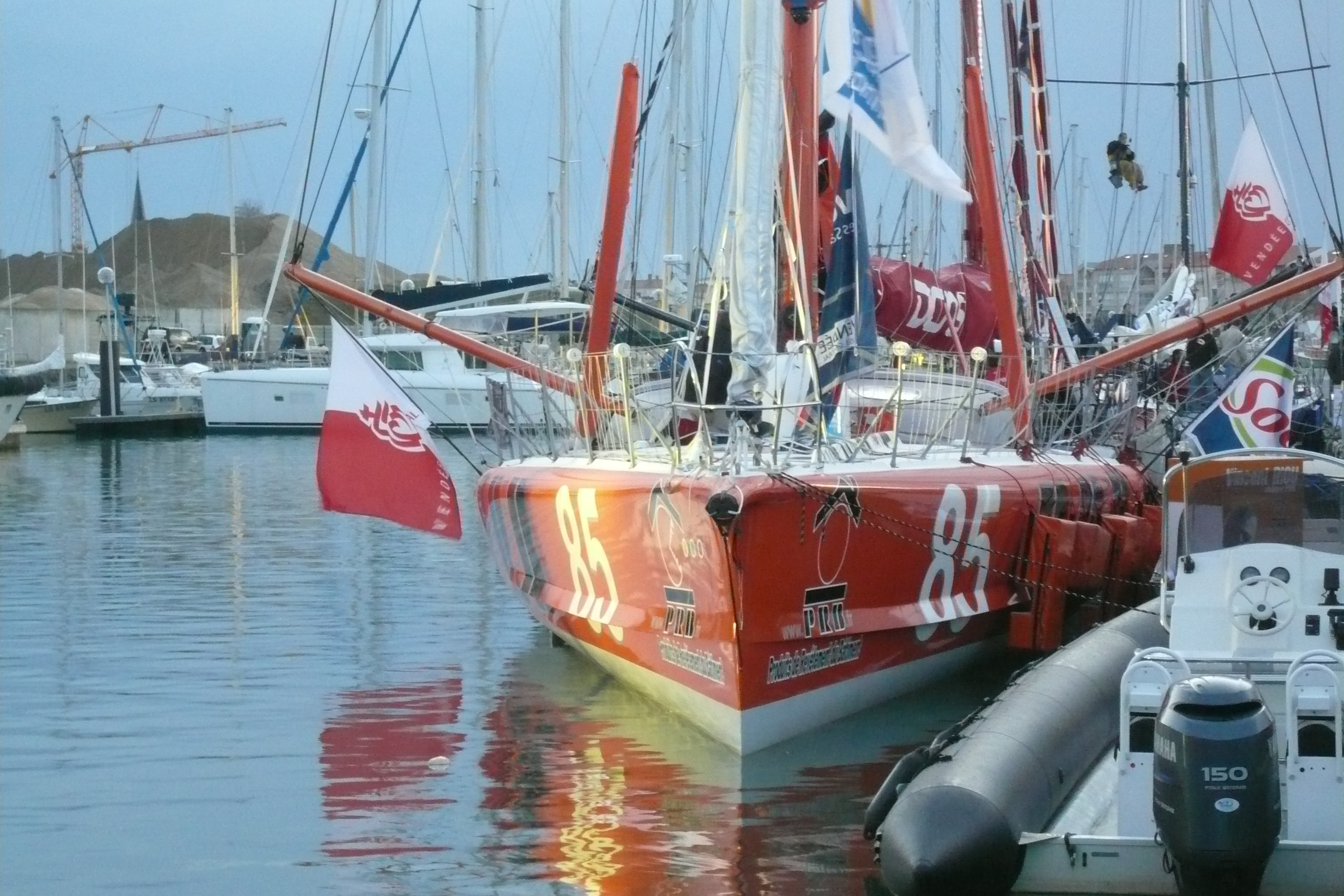

Development
- Year: 30 September 2006
- Builder: CDK Technologies

Hull appendages
- Keel: Canting Keel
- Rudder: Twin Rudders

Rig
- Rig type: Rotating Mast with Deck Spreaders

Racing
- Class association: IMOCA 60

The IMOCA 60 class yacht PRB 4 was designed by Farr Yacht Design and launched in September 2006 after being assembled by CDK Technologies based in Lorient, France. The boat is a sister ship to Foncia, which was launched in May 2007.

== Names and ownership ==
PRB 4 (2006-2009)

- Skipper: Vincent Riou

Akena Vérendas (2009-2014)

- Skipper: Arnaud Boissieres

Initiatives-Coeur (2014-2017)

- Skipper: Tanguy De Lamotte

Bastide - Otio (2017)

- Skipper: Kito de Pavant and Yannick Bestaven

Maître CoQ III (2018)

- Skipper: Yannick Bestaven

Kostum - Lantana Paysage (2020-2021)

- Skipper: Louis Duc

Fives Group - Lantana Environnement (since 2022)

- Skipper: Louis Duc
- Sail No.: FRA 172

== Racing results ==
Pos	Year	Race	Class	Boat name	Skipper	Notes	Ref
Round the world races
RET	2016	2016–2017 Vendée Globe	IMOCA 60	Initiatives-Cœur (2), FRA 109	Tanguy De Lamotte (FRA)	Day 23: Damaged masthead – North of Cape Verde Islands	
8 / 20	2012	2012–2013 Vendée Globe	IMOCA 60	Akena Vérandas 3	Arnaud Boissieres (FRA)	91d 02h 09m	
RET	2009	2008–2009 Vendée Globe	IMOCA 60	PRB 3	Vincent Riou (FRA)		
RET	2007	Barcelona World Race	IMOCA 60	PRB 3	Sebastien Josse (FRA); Vincent Riou (FRA)		
Transatlantic Races
DNF	2018	Route du Rhum	IMOCA 60	Maitre Coq III	Yannick Bestaven (FRA)		
5	2015	Transat Jacques Vabre	IMOCA 60	Initiatives Cœur (2)	Samantha Davies (GBR); Tanguy de Lamotte (FRA)		
7	2014	Route du Rhum	IMOCA 60	Initiatives Cœur (2)	Tanguy de Lamotte (FRA)	4d 10h 49m	
DNF	2008	Artemist Transat	IMOCA 60	PRB 3	Vincent Riou (FRA)	Boat abandoned and later recovered	
Other Races

== Galerie ==
=== PRB (3) ===
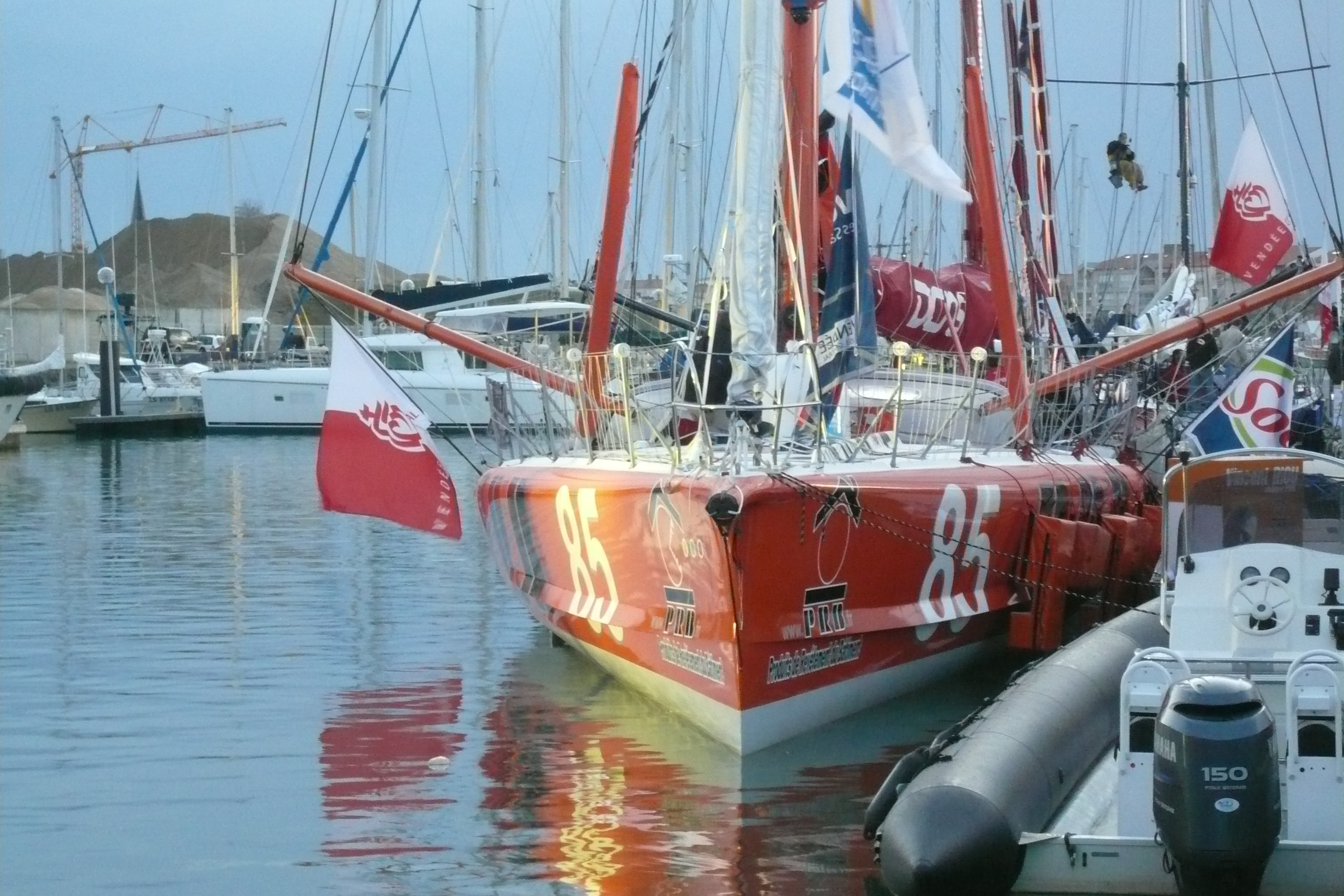

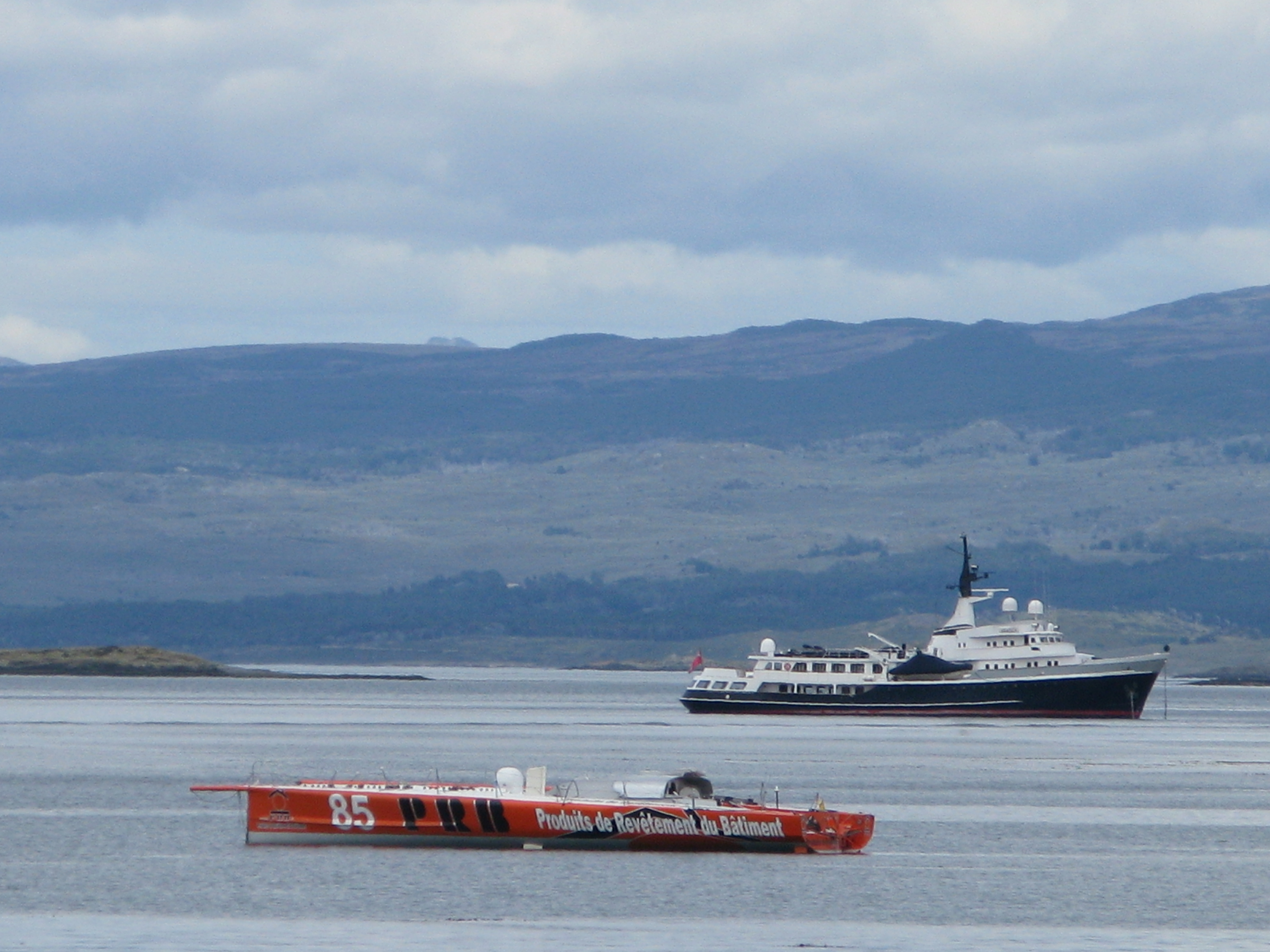

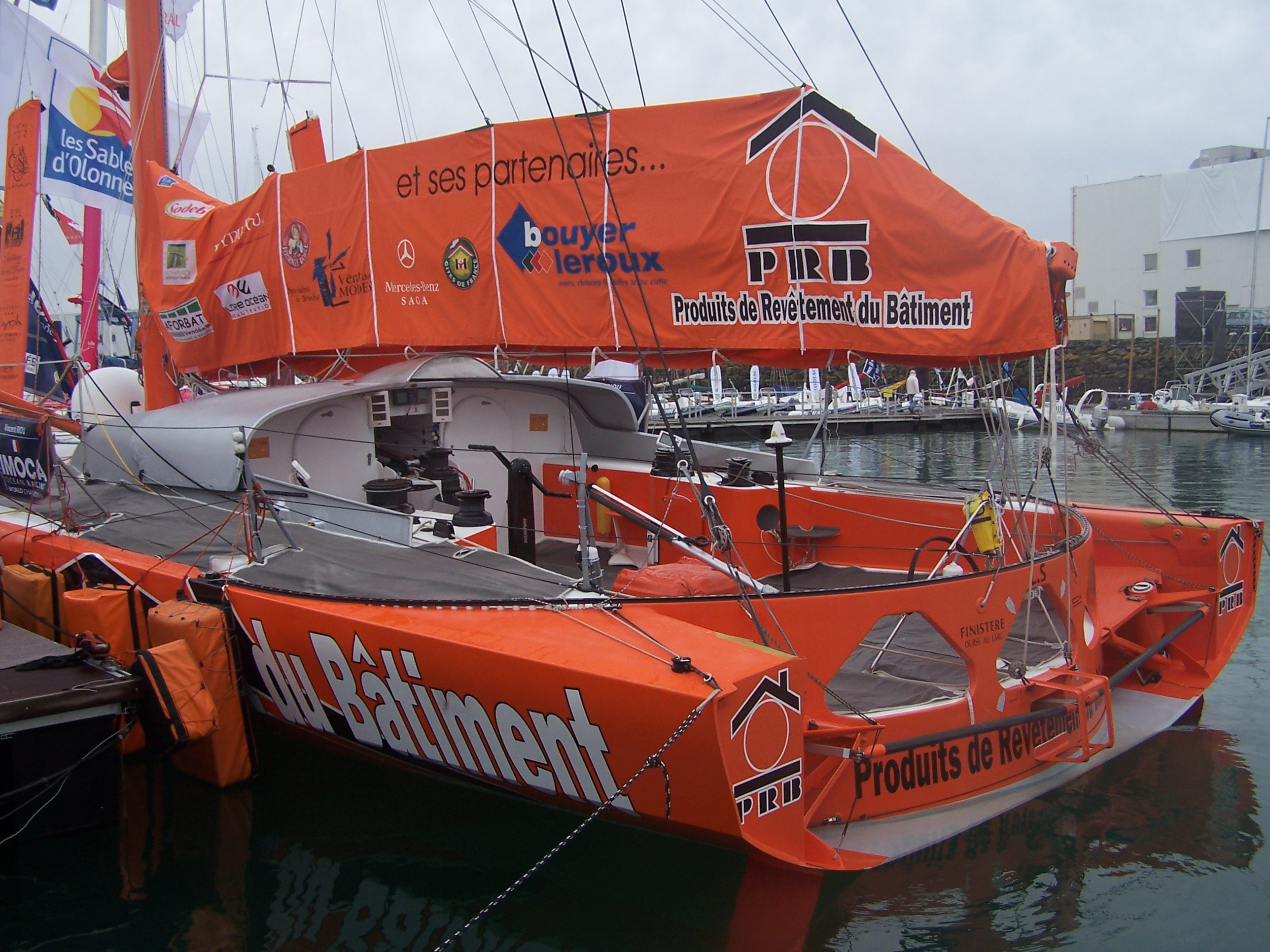

=== Akena Vérandas (3) ===
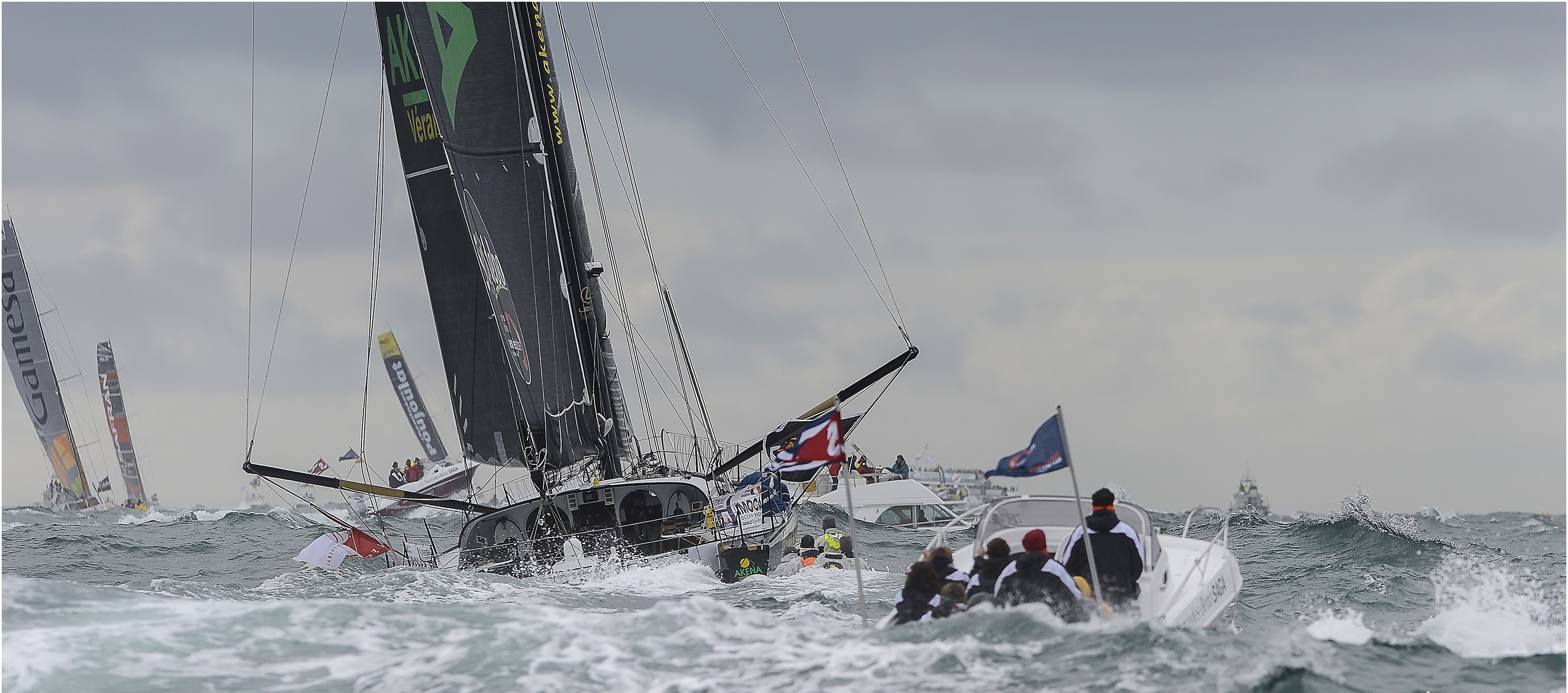

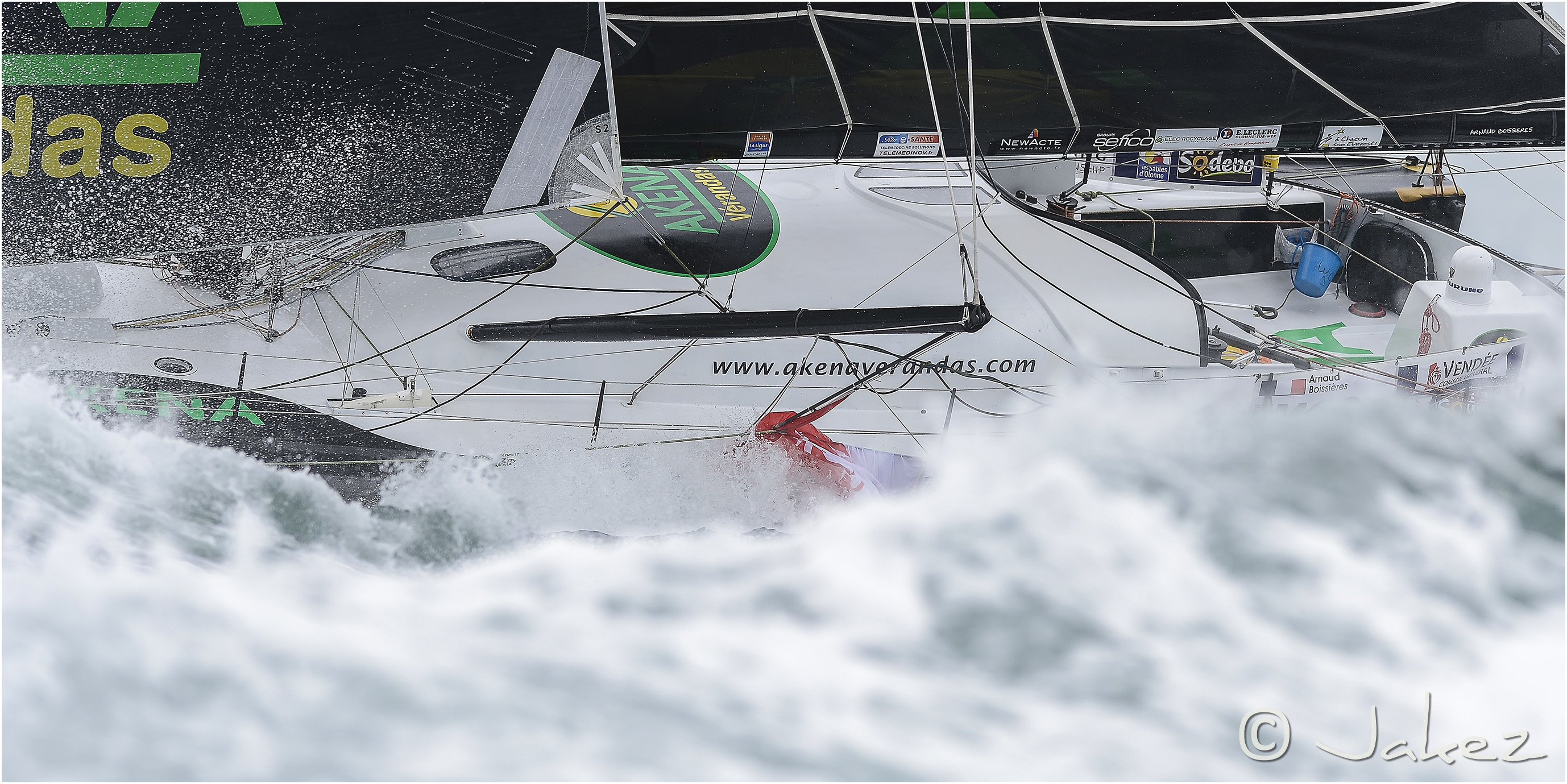

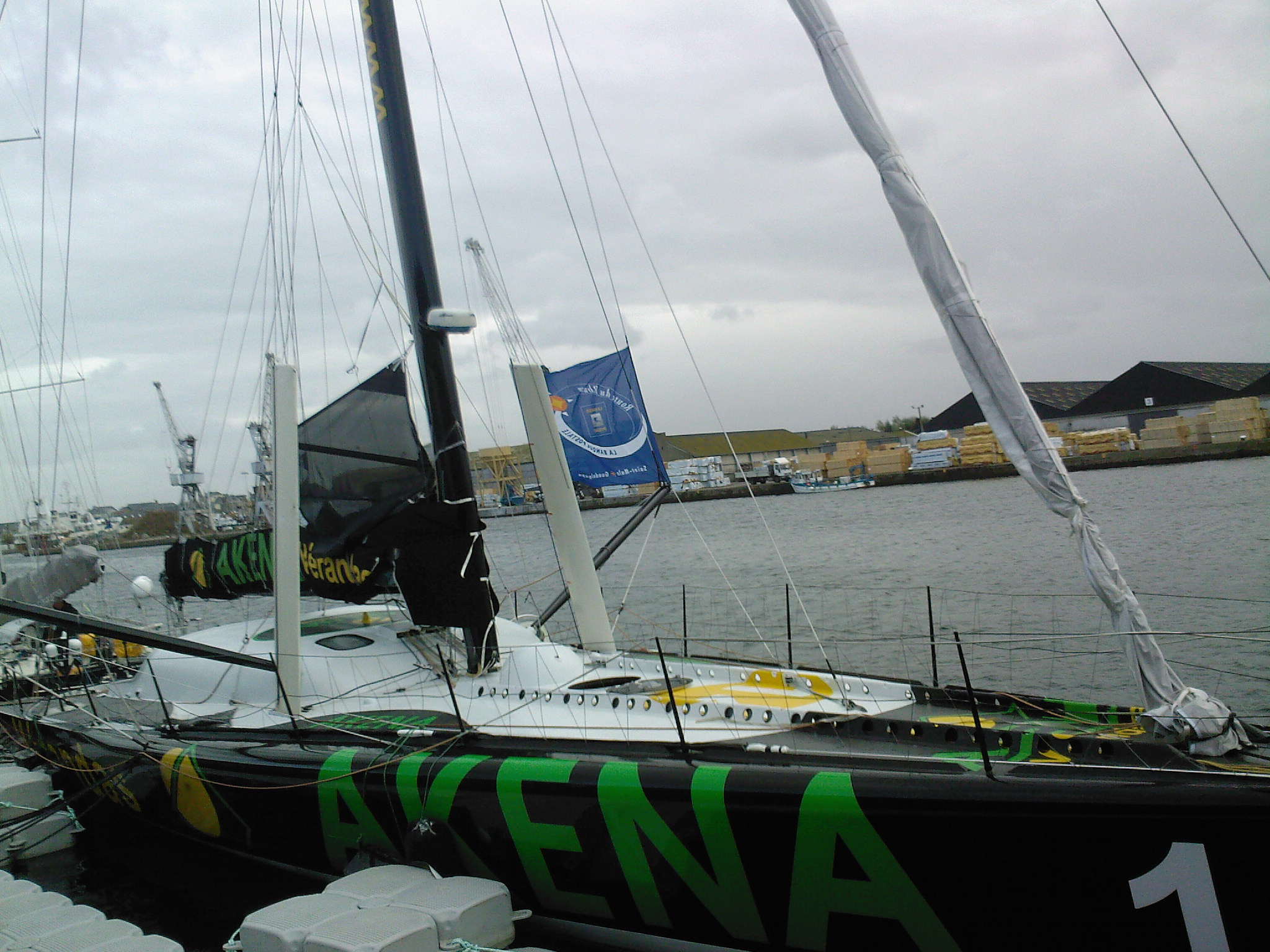

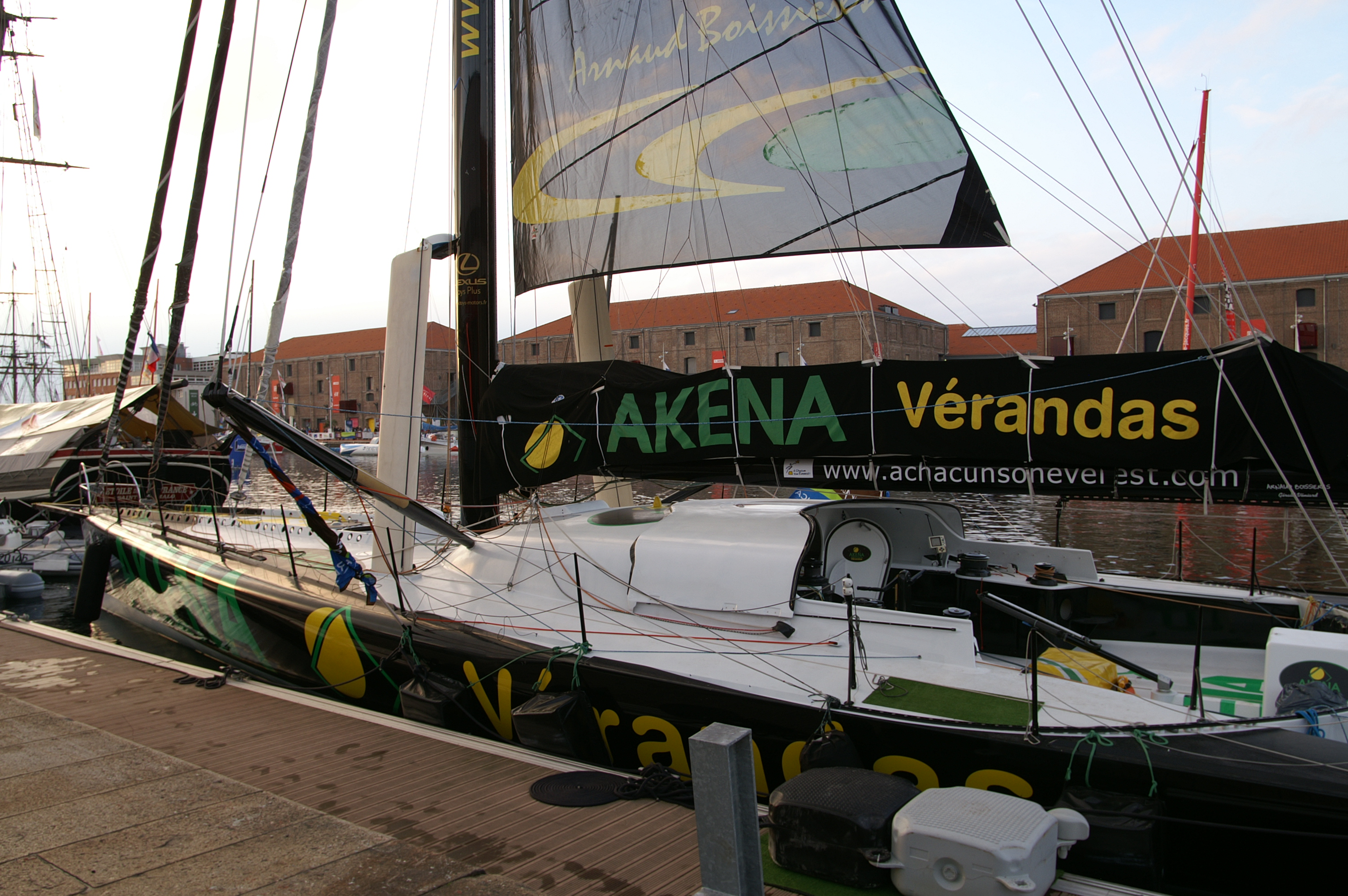

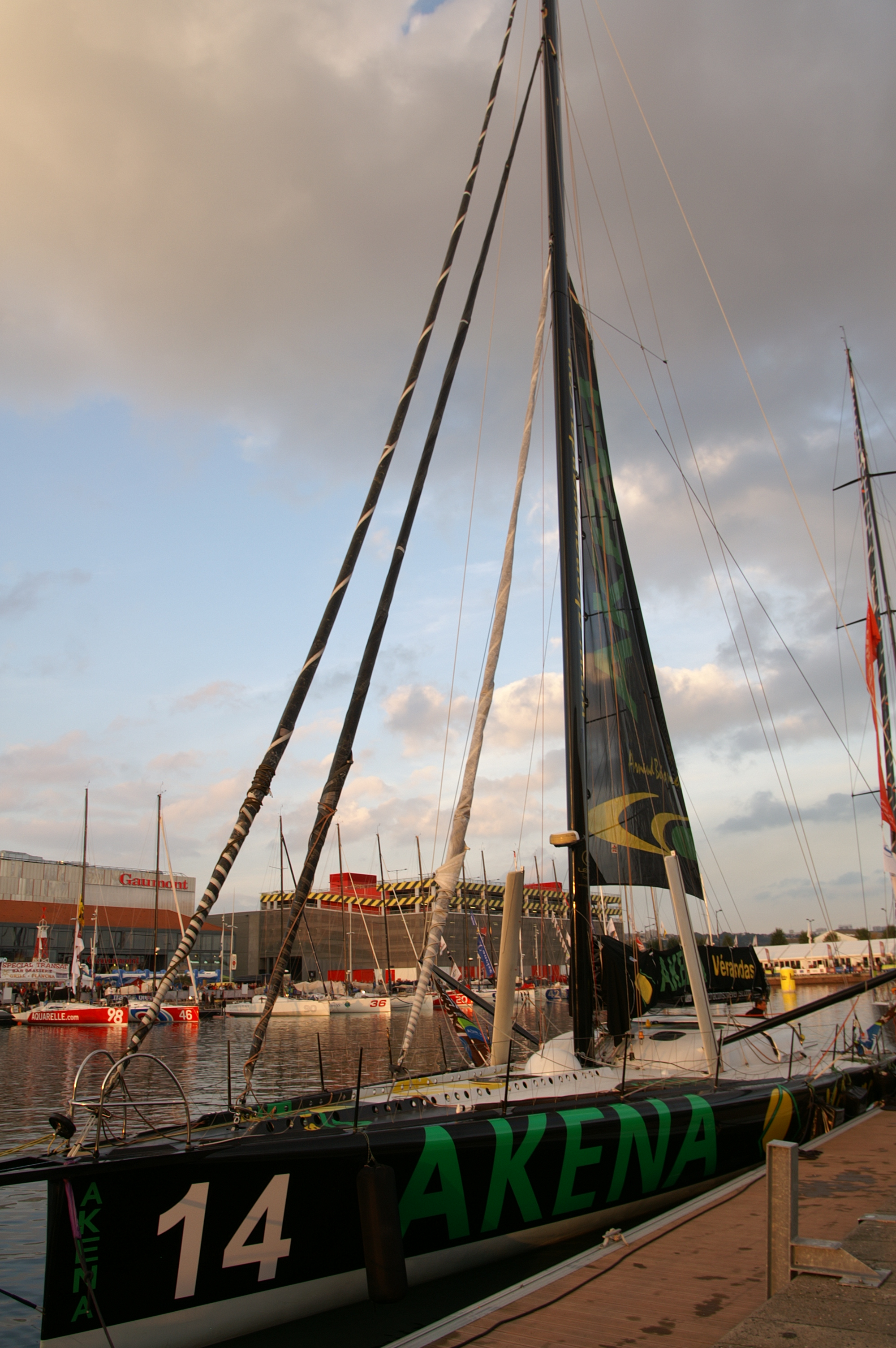

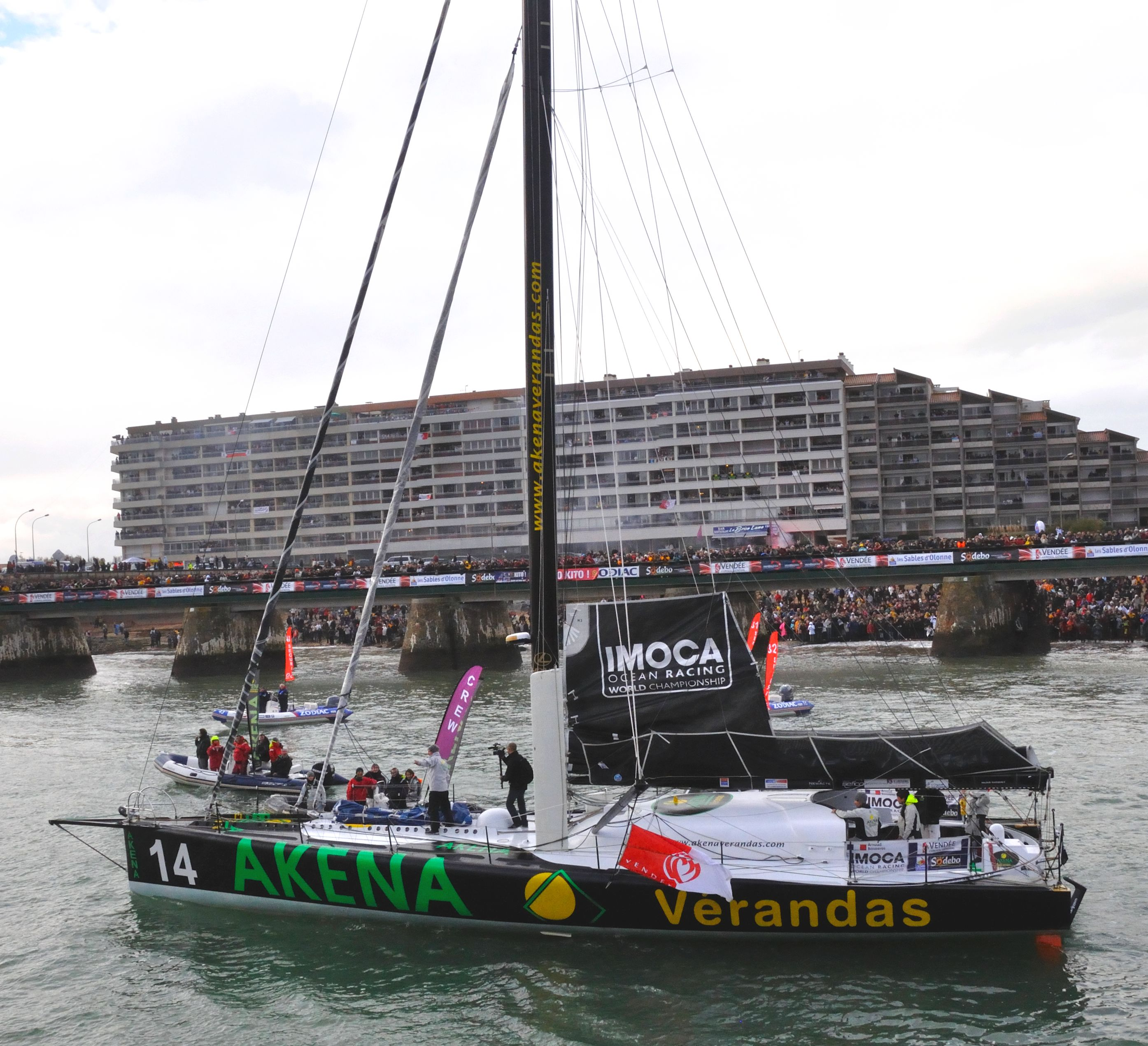

=== Initiatives-Cœur (2) ===
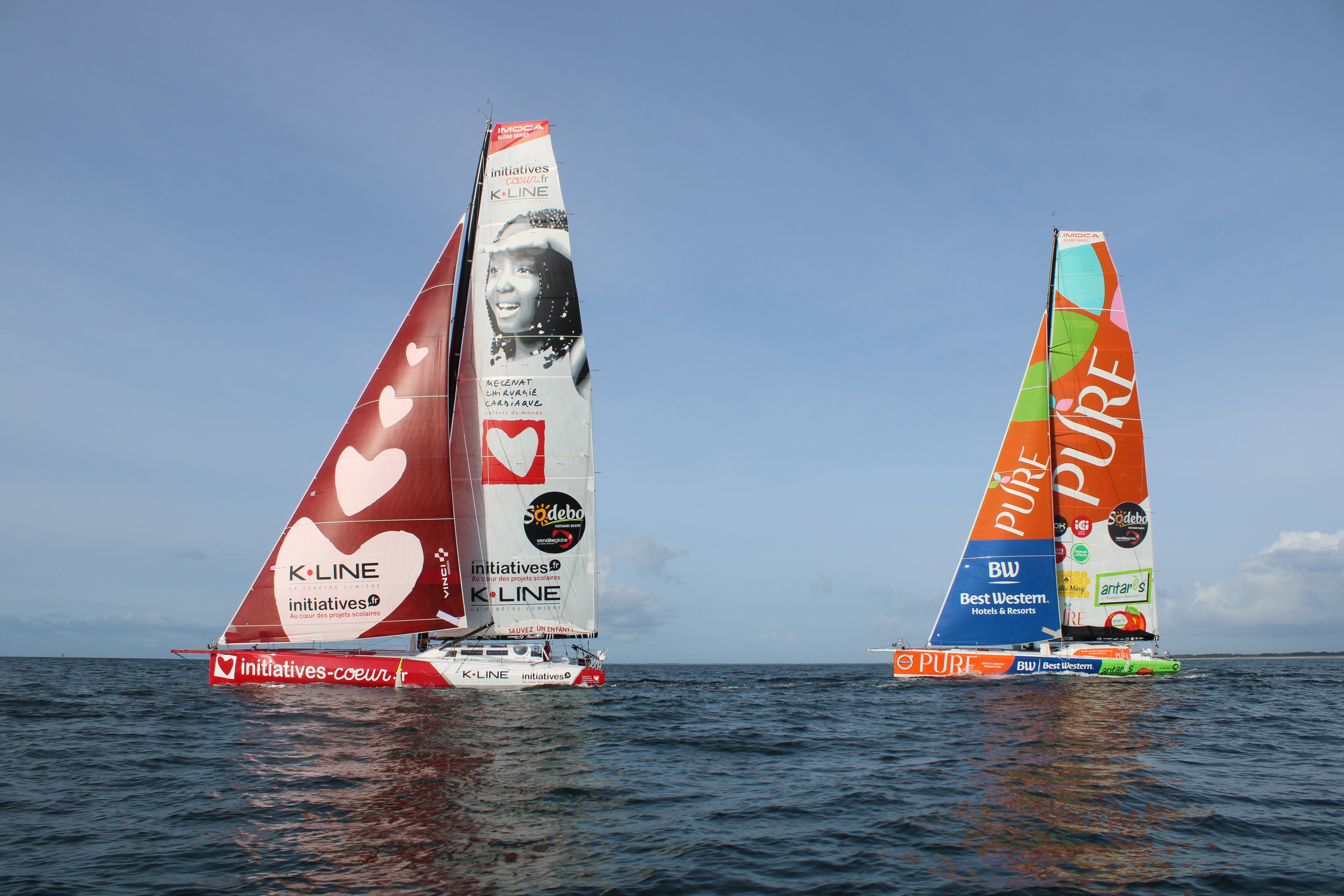

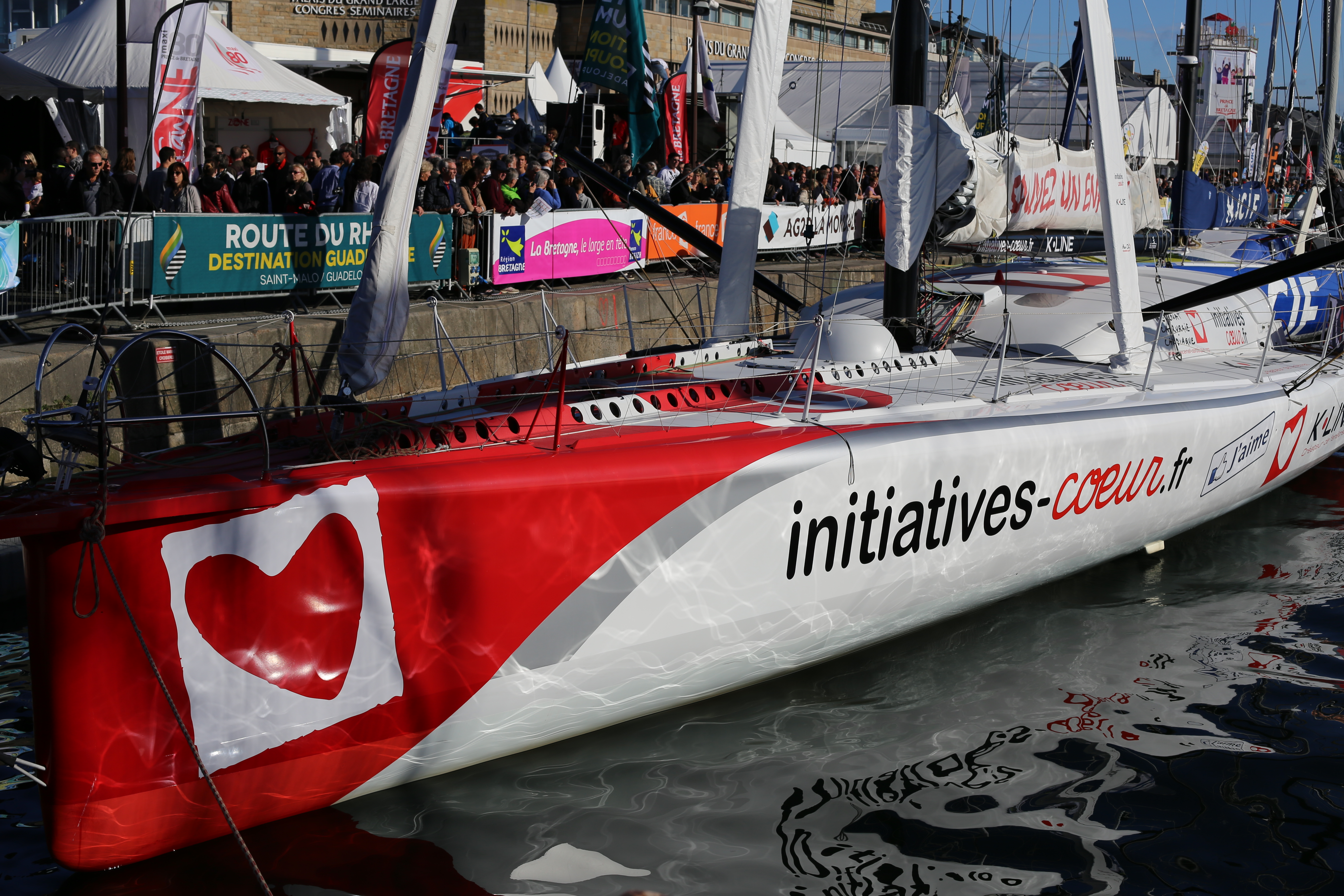
