= Tanguy de Lamotte =

French offshore sailor and navigator (born 1978)

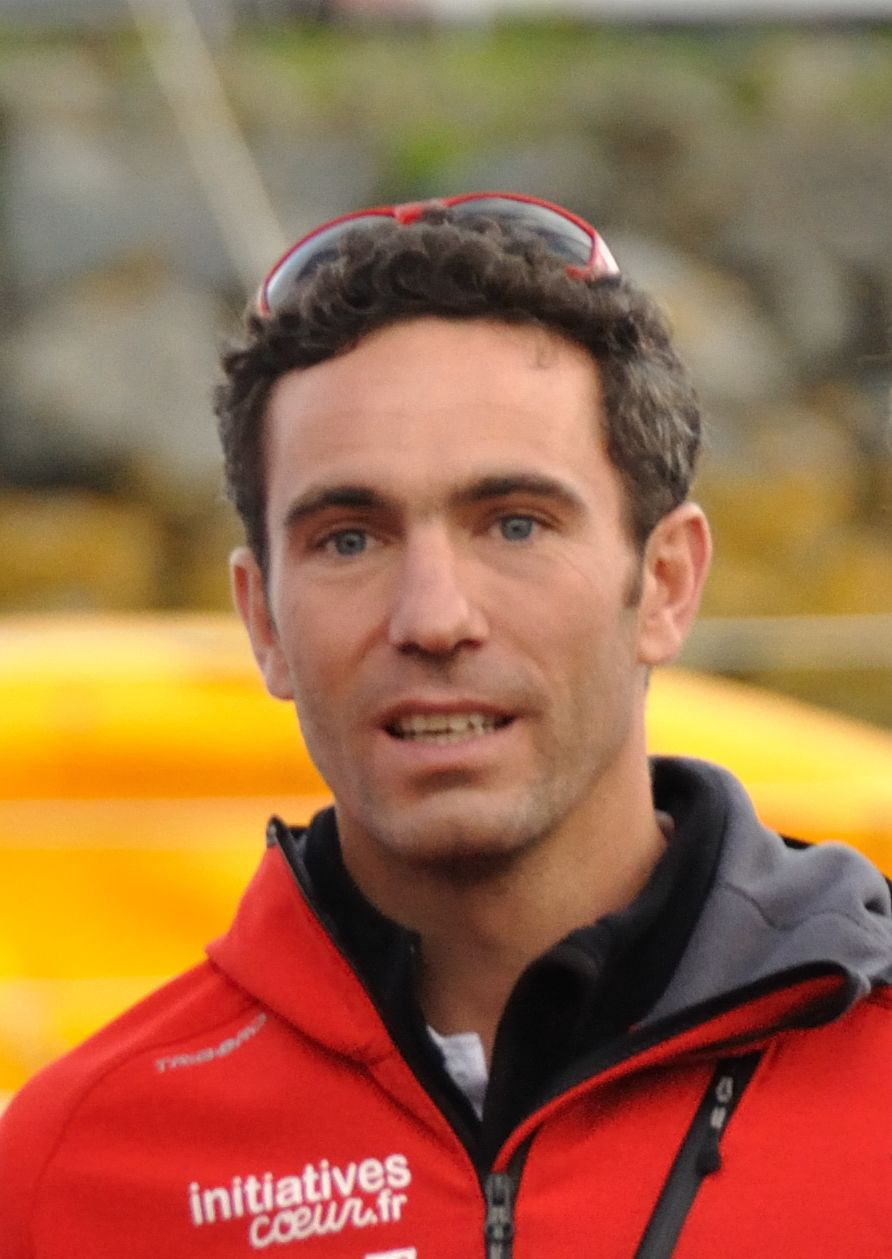

Personal information
- Nationality: French
- Born: 6 May 1978 (age 48) Versailles

Sailing career
- Sport: Sailing

Tanguy de Lamotte is a French sailor born on 6 May 1978 in Versailles, Yvelines. He is a Naval Architect by training, having studied Yacht and Powercraft Design at Southampton Solent University in the UK.

== Sailing results ==
Year	Pos	Race	Class	Boat name	Notes	Ref.
Round the World Race
2017	DNF	2016-2017 Vendée Globe	IMOCA 60	Initiatives Cœur (2)	Day 23: Damaged masthead – North of Cape Verde Islands	
2013	10	2012-2013 Vendée Globe	IMOCA 60	Initiatives Cœur (1)	98d 21h 56' 10"	
Trans Oceanic
2017	6	Transat Jacques Vabre	IMOCA 60	Initiatives-Cœur (3)	with Samantha Davies (GBR)	
2015	5 / 20	Transat Jacques Vabre	IMOCA 60	Initiatives Cœur (2)	with Samantha Davies (GBR)	
2013	8 / 10	Transat Jacques-Vabre	IMOCA 60	Initiatives Cœur (1)	with François Damiens (FRA)	
2007	6	Transat Jacques Vabre				
2014	7	Route du Rhum	IMOCA 60	Initiatives-Heart		
2010	15	Route du Rhum				
2016	6	Transat New-York Vendée solo				
Other Races
2011	1	Rolex Fastnet Race	Class40			
2011	1	Normandy Channel Race			with Sébastien Audigane	
2012	7	Solidarity of Chocolate			with Jean Galfione	
2009	1	Chocolate Solidarity				
2009	3	Transmanche Express				
2008	1	Class 40 World Championship	Class40			
2008	1	Marblehead - Halifax				
2008	3	Transat Québec-Saint-Malo	Class40			
2005	7	Mini Transat Race	Mini Transat 6.50			
2005	WR	Record crossing of the Mediterranean	Maxi	Orange 2	crewed skippered by Bruno Peyron	

== Gallery ==
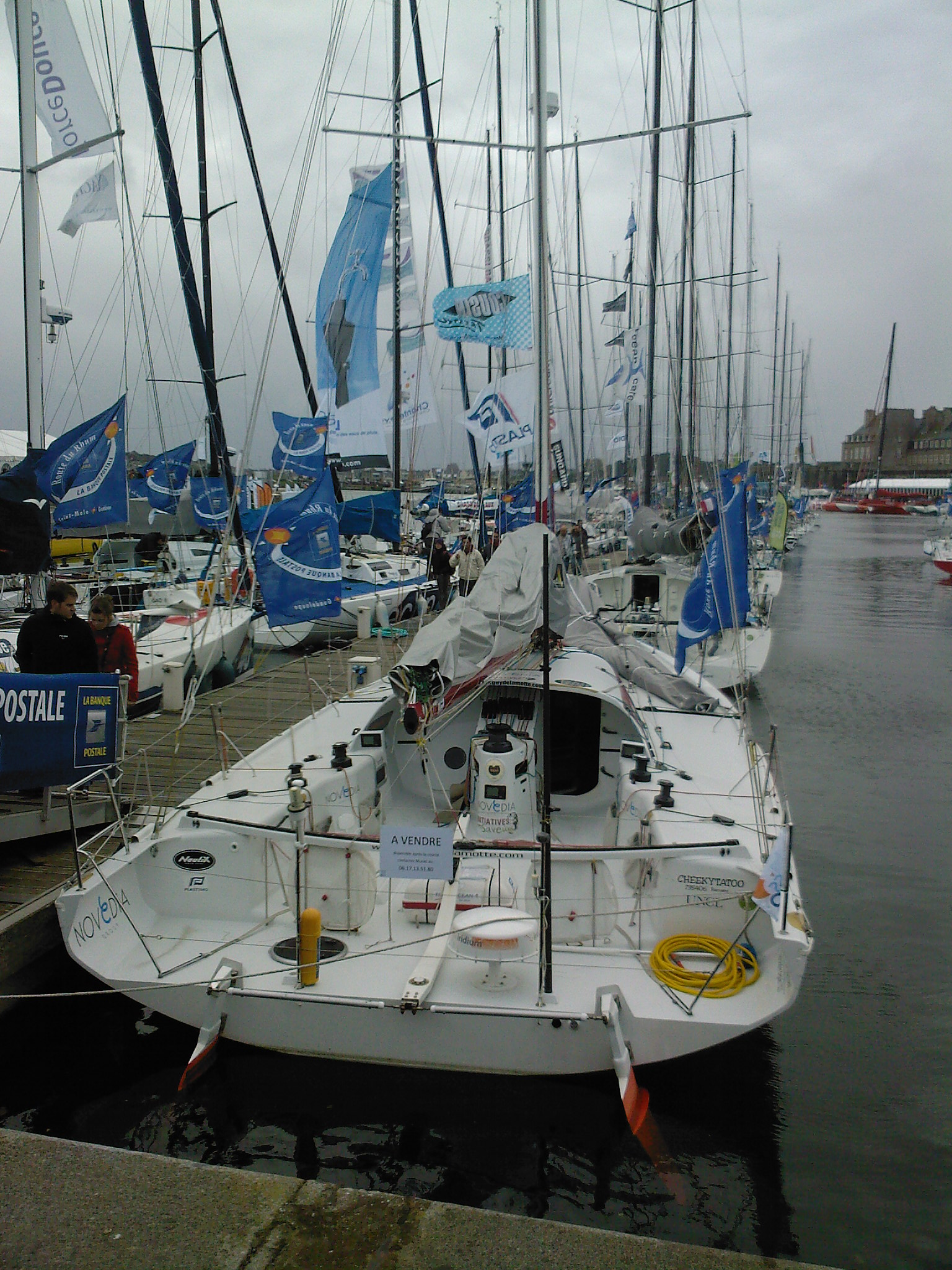

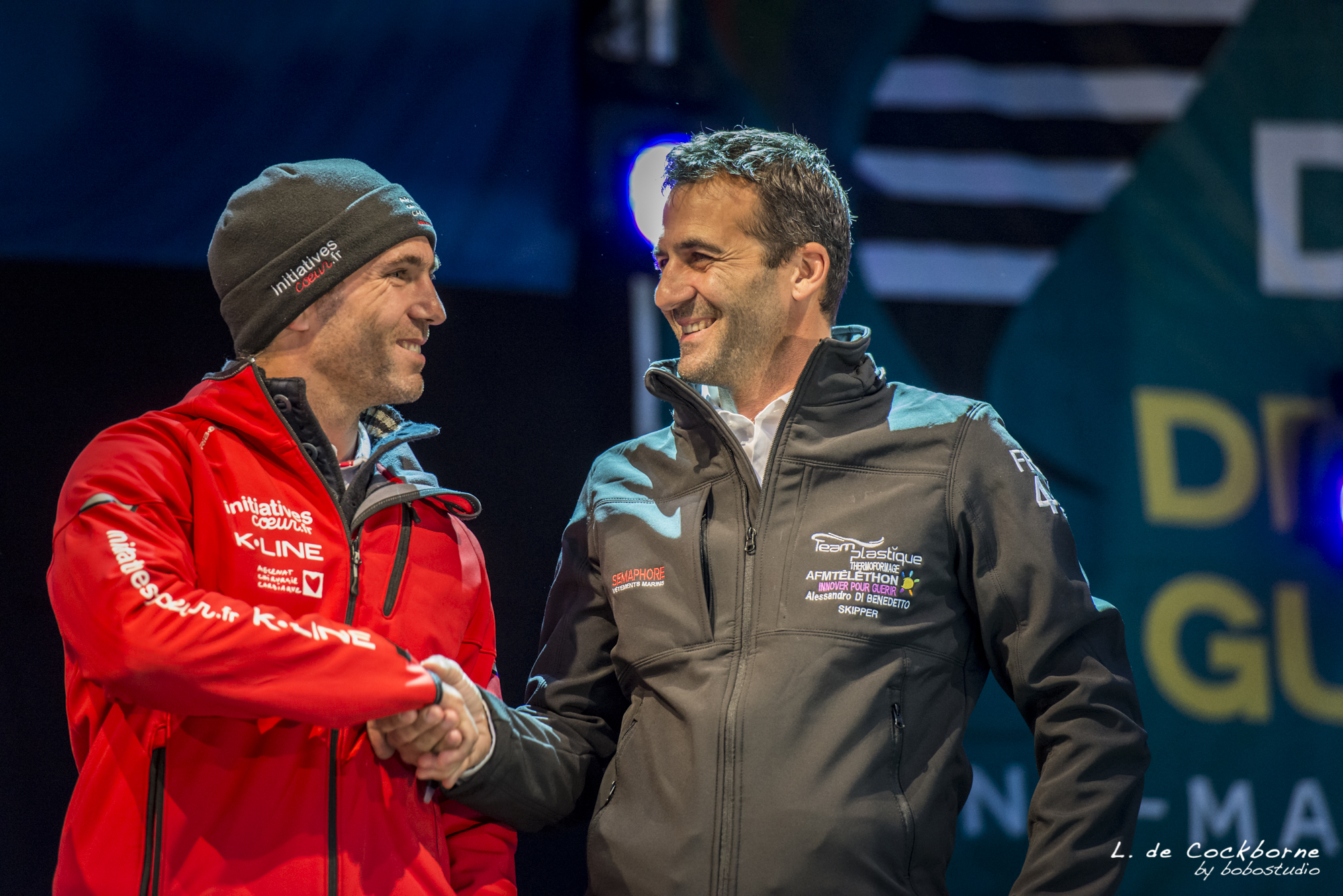

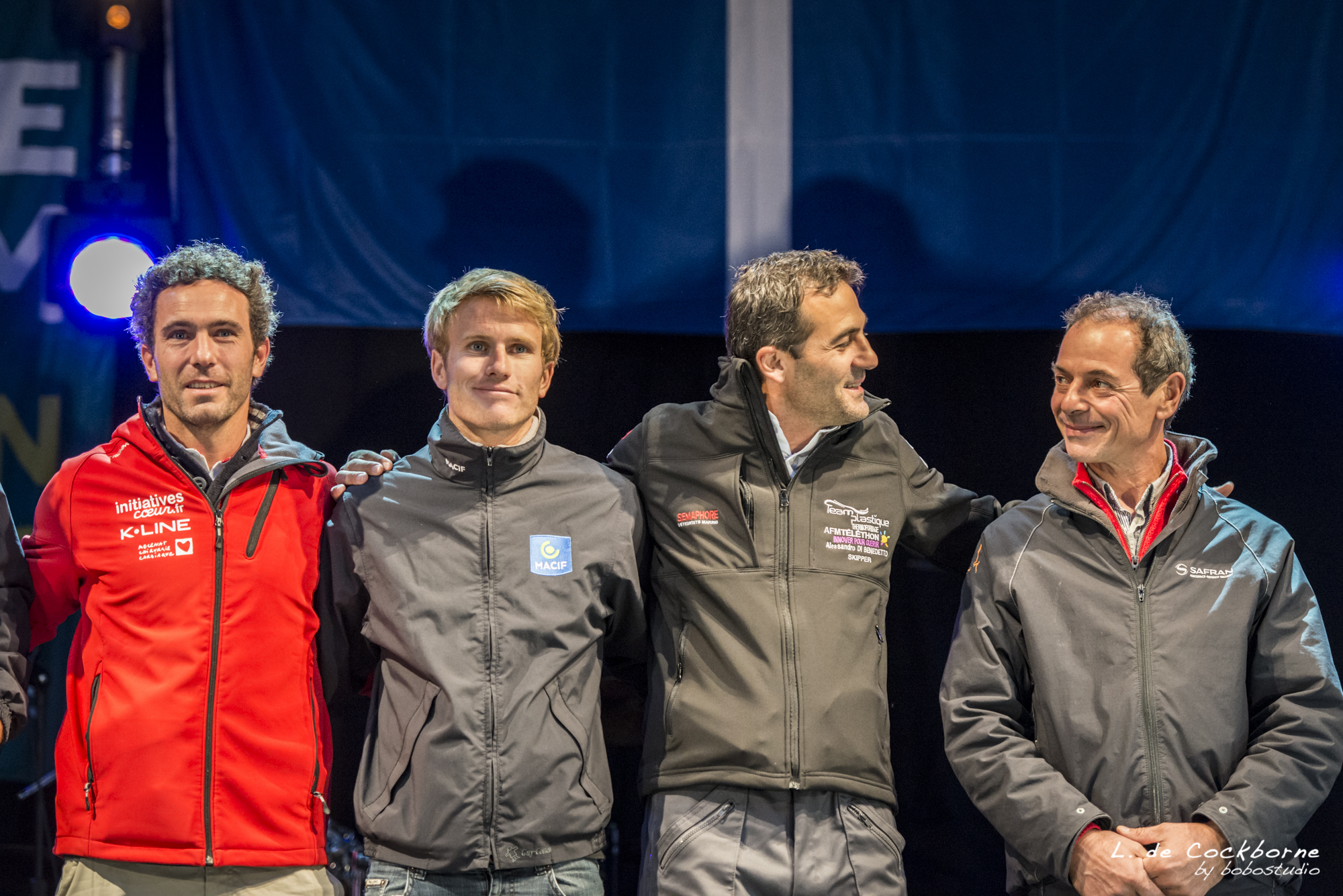

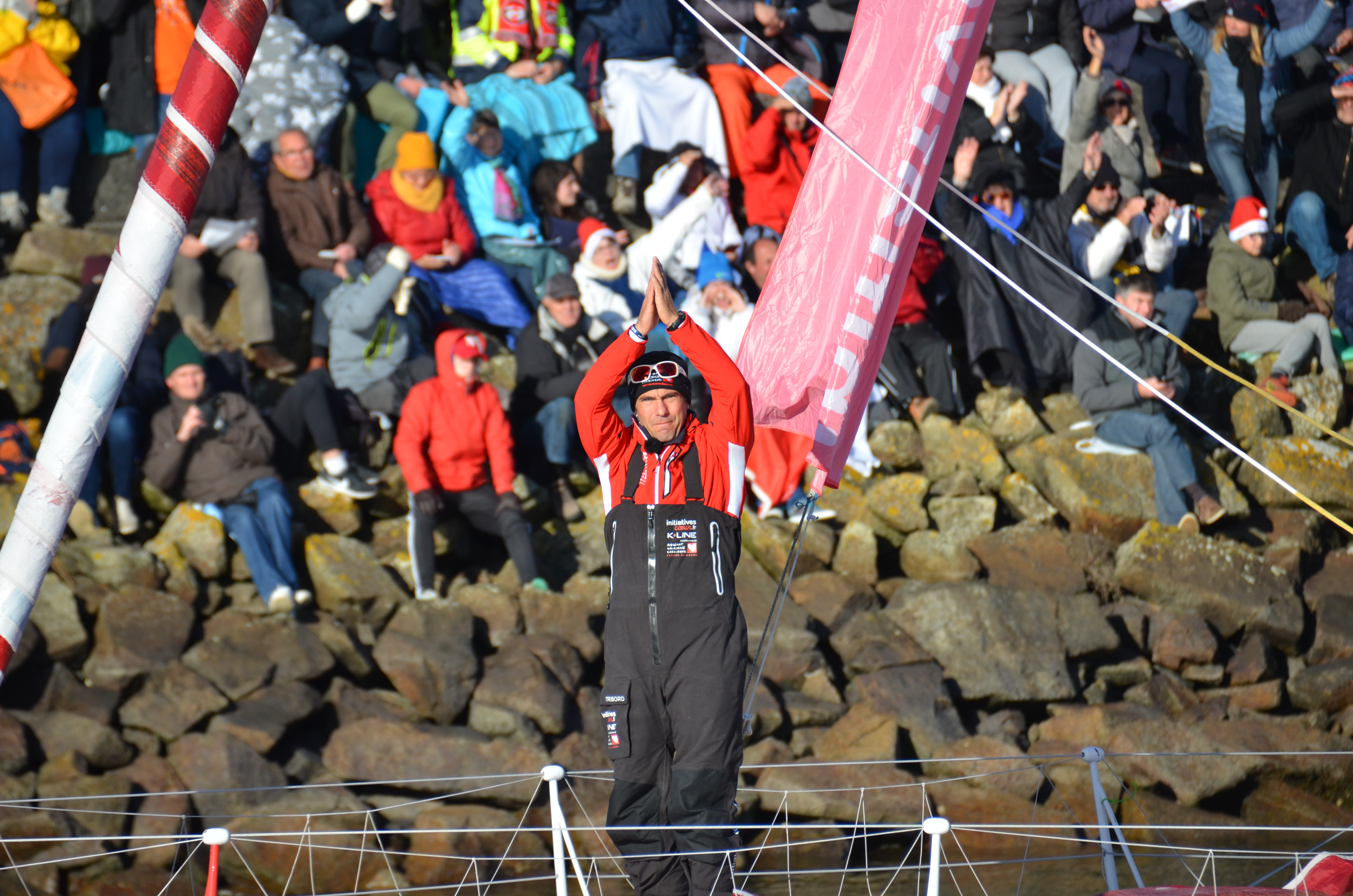

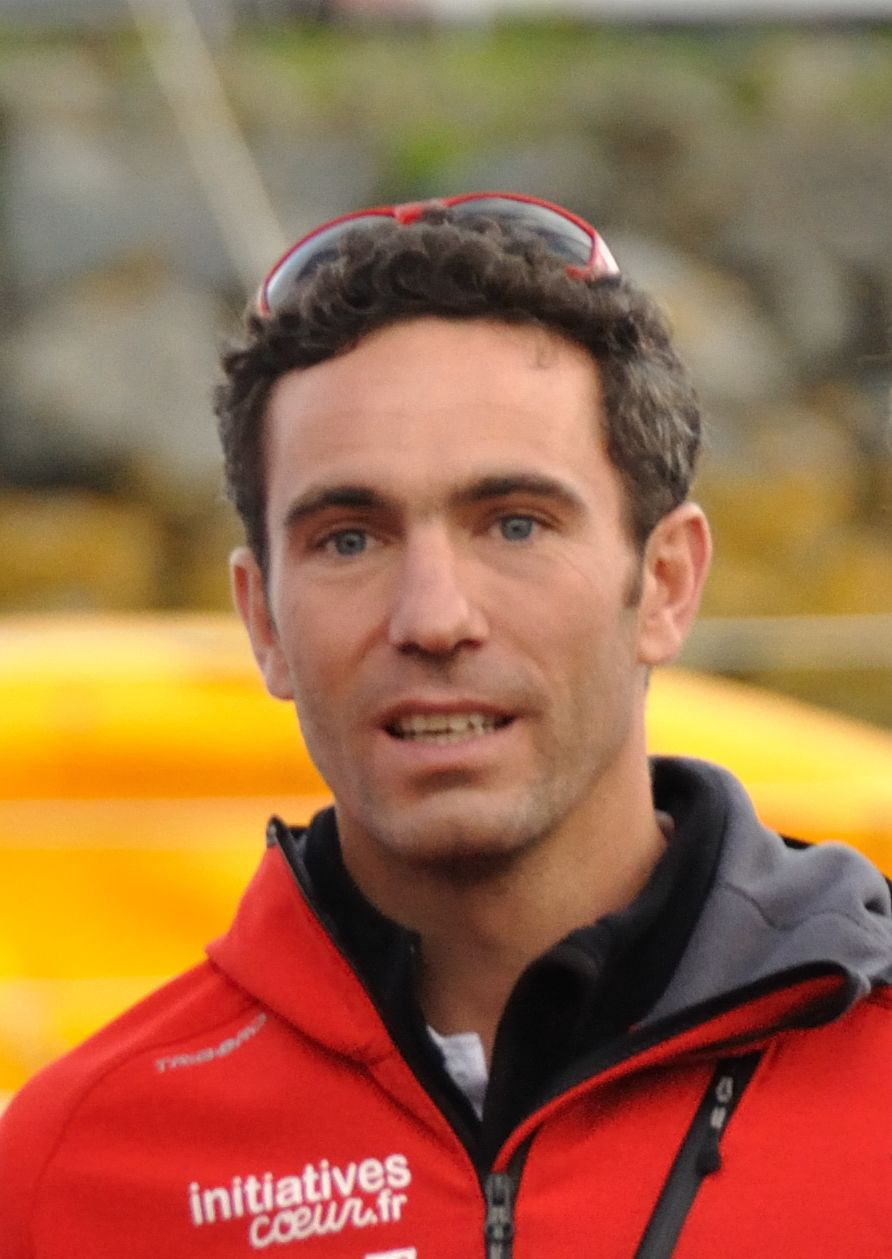

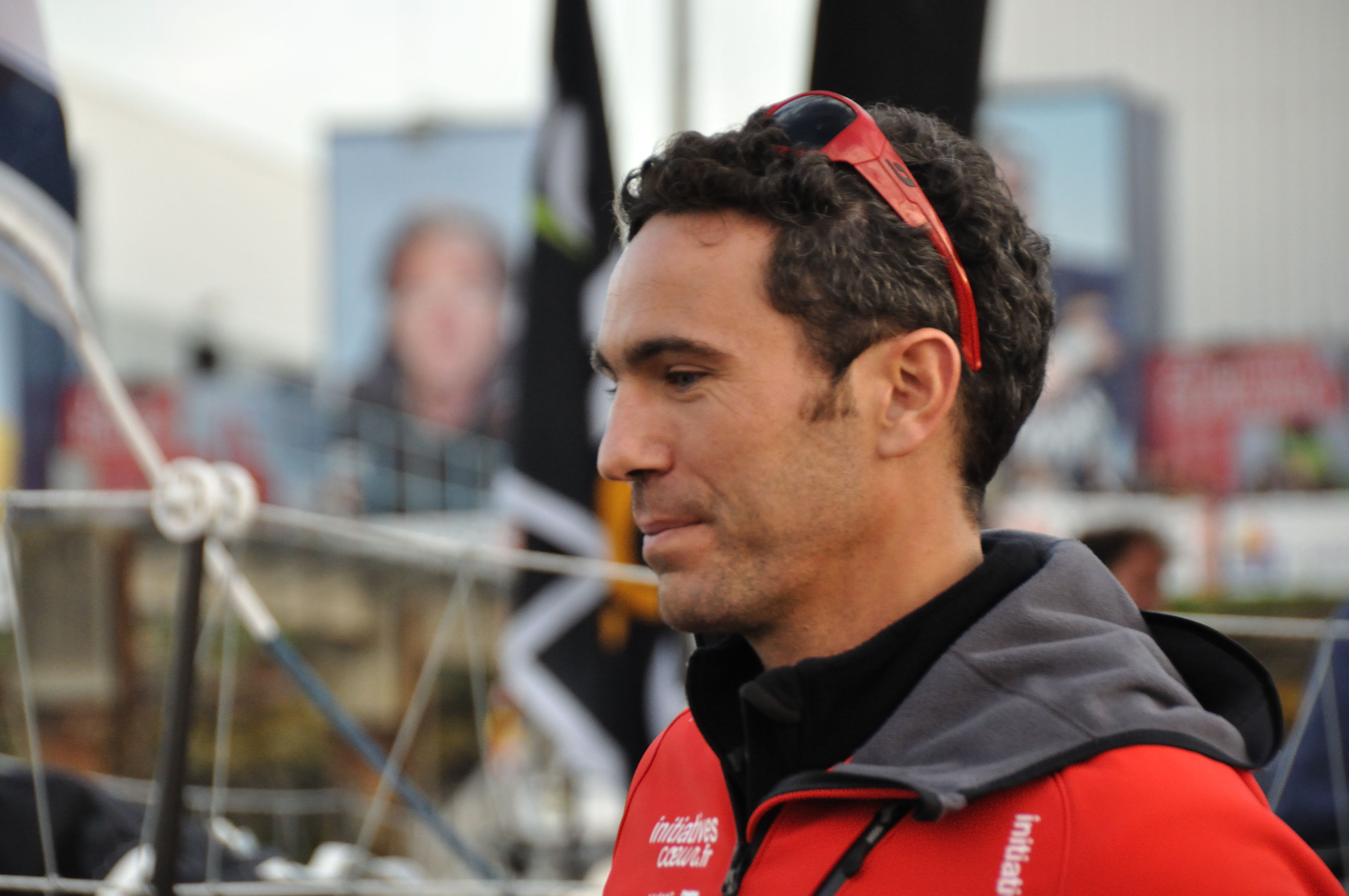

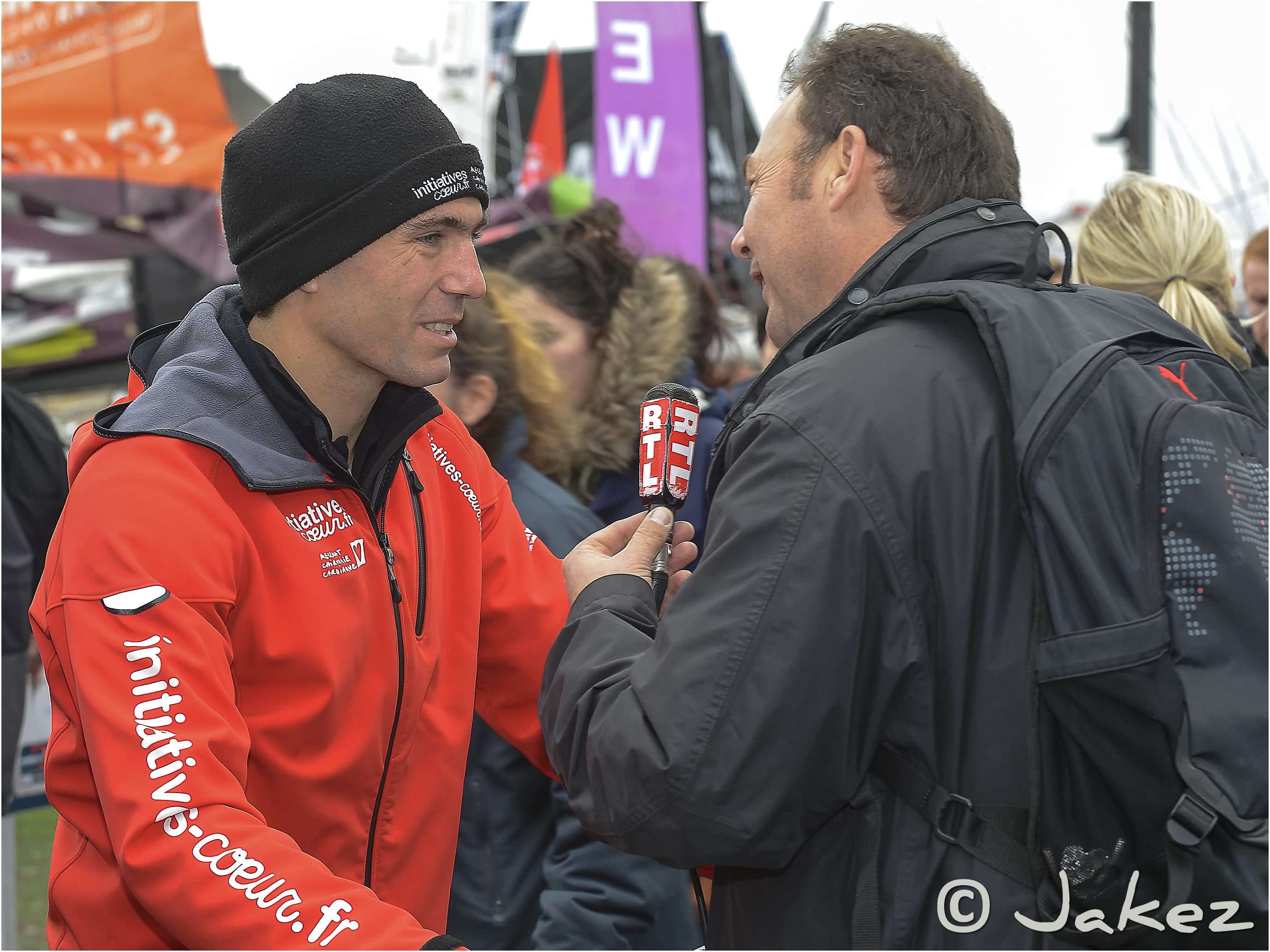

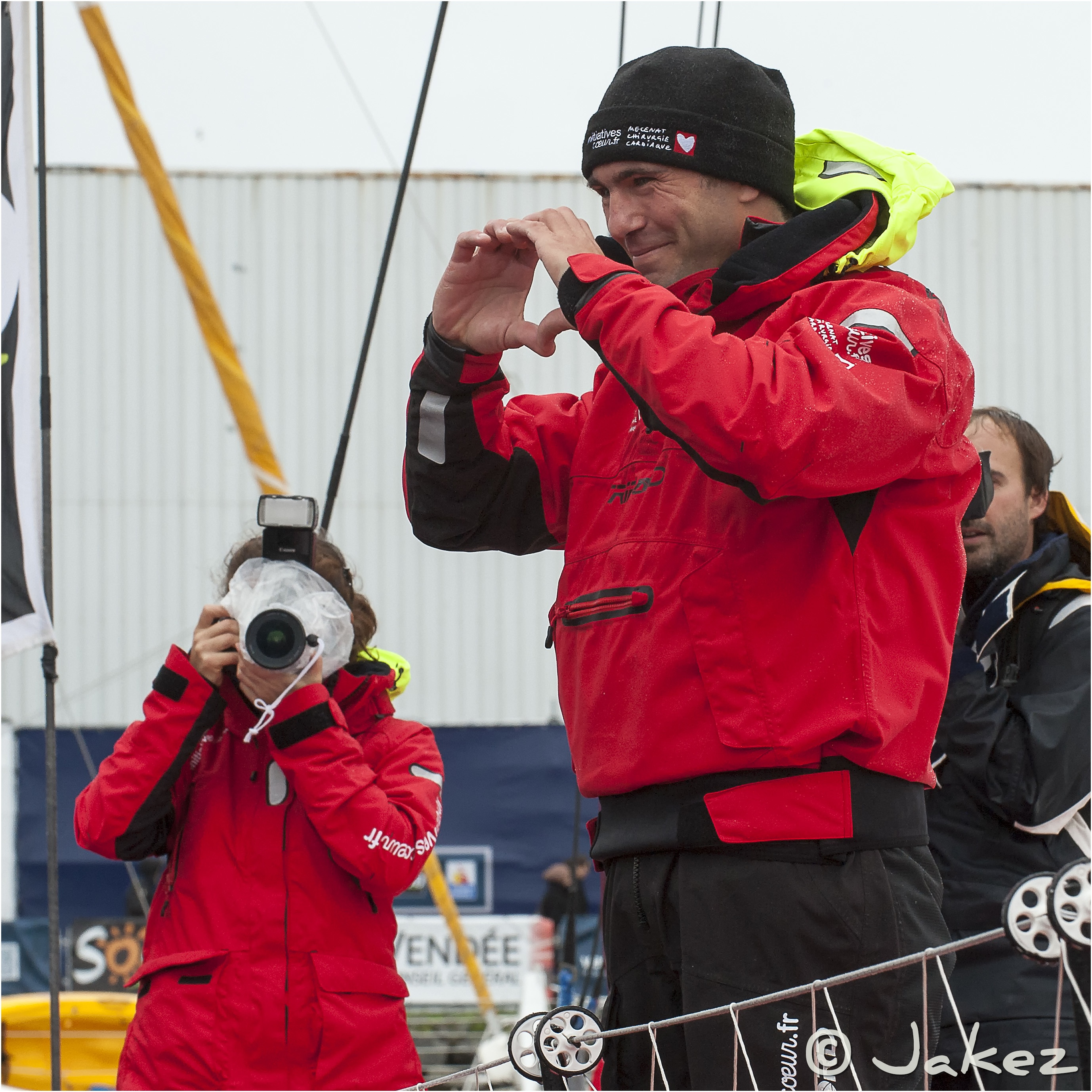

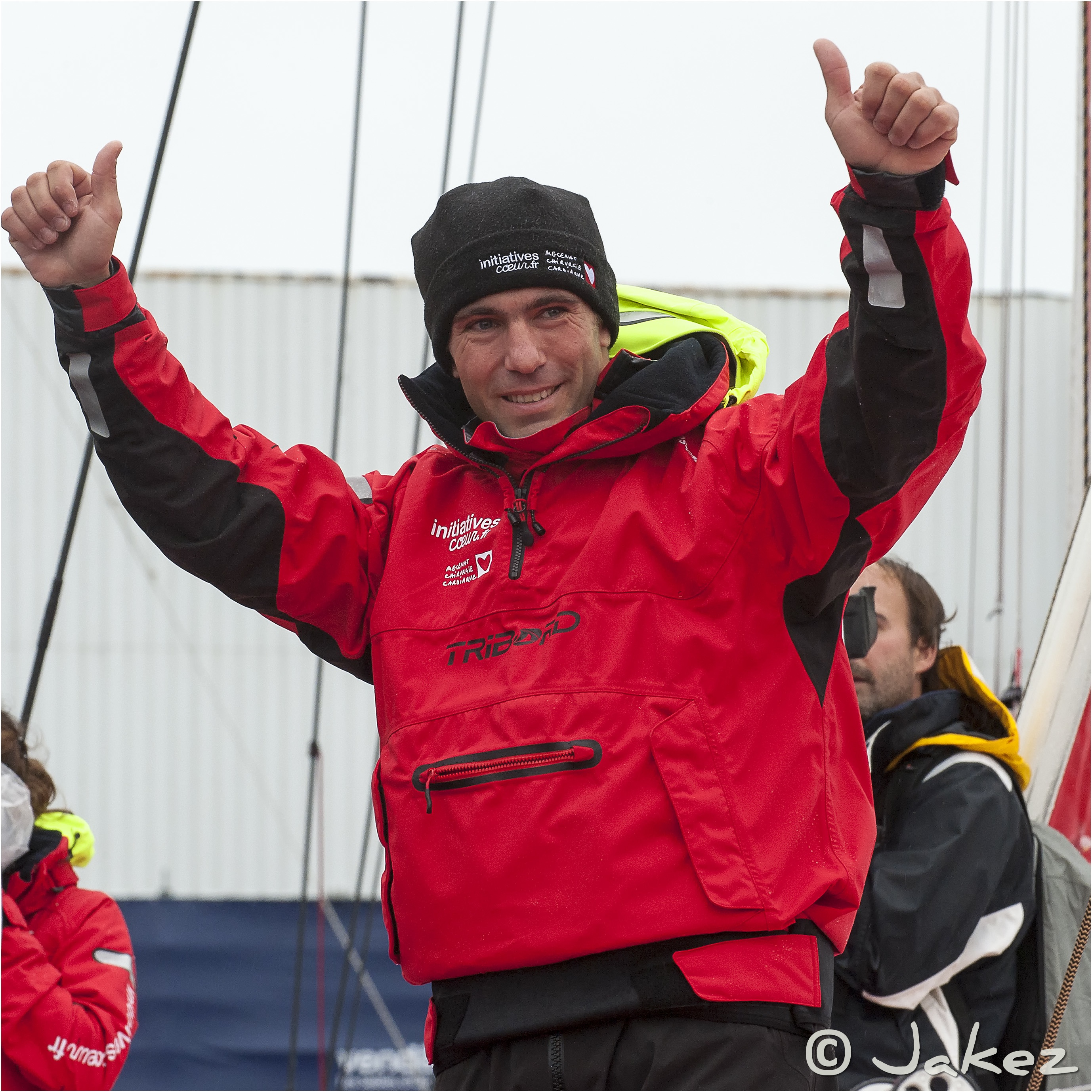

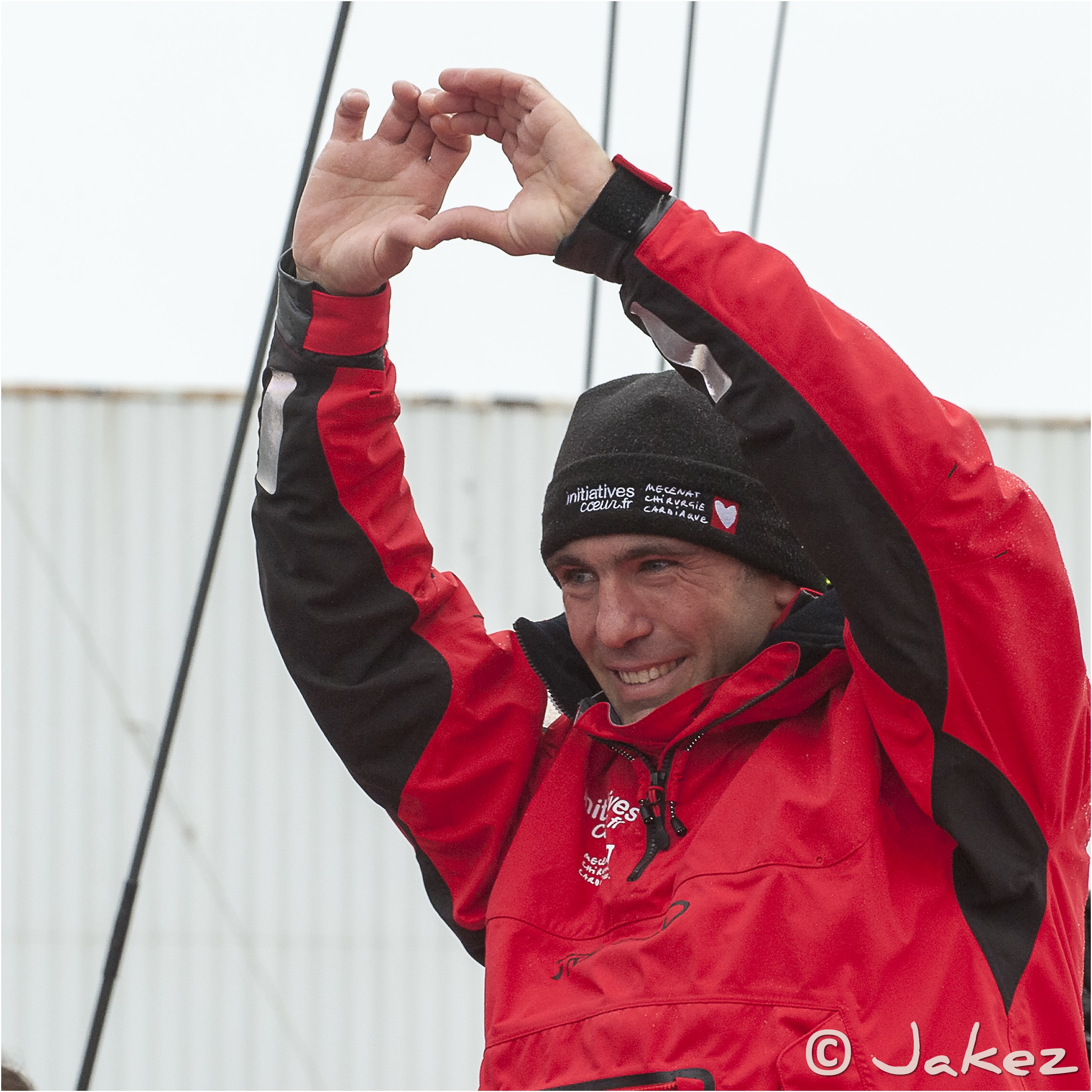

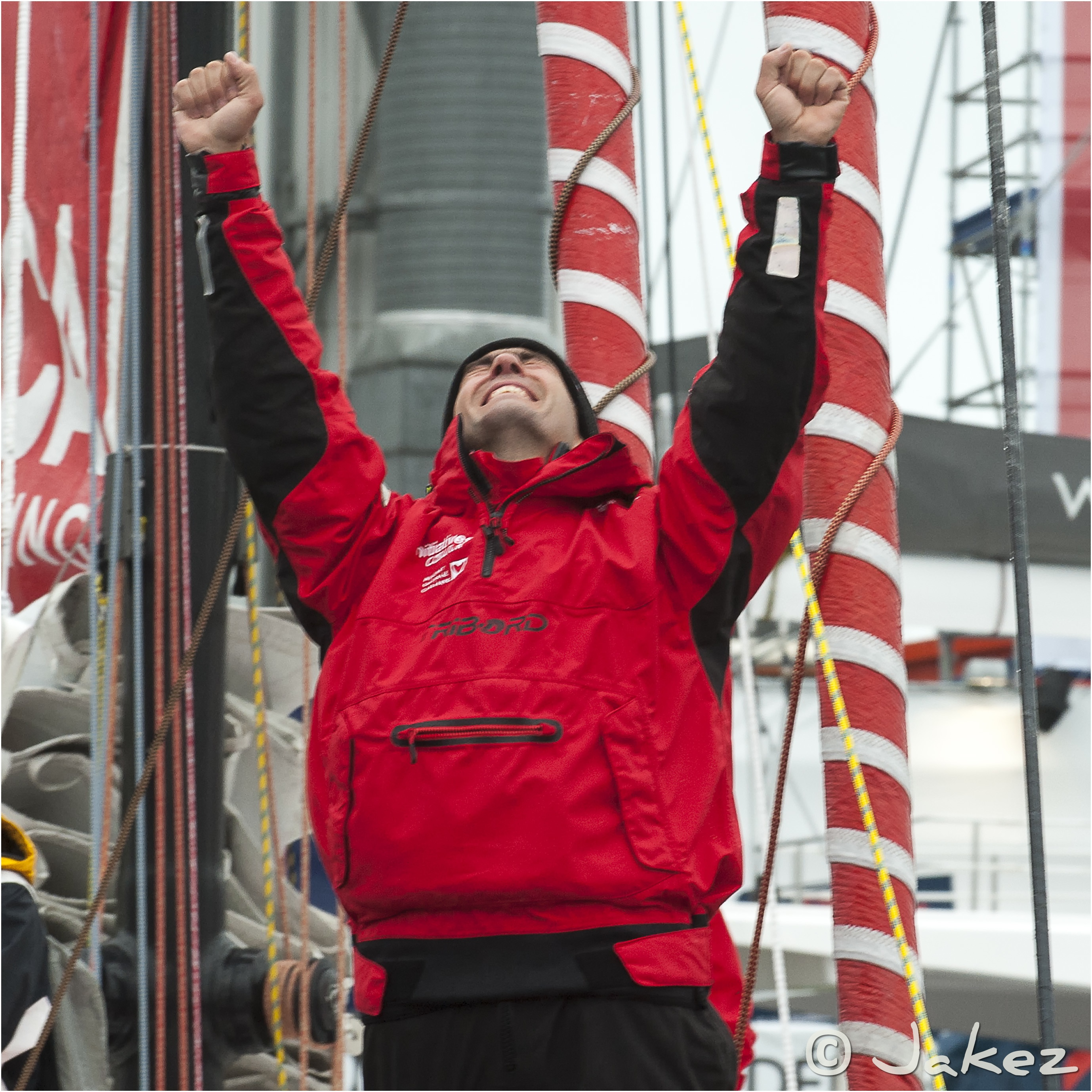

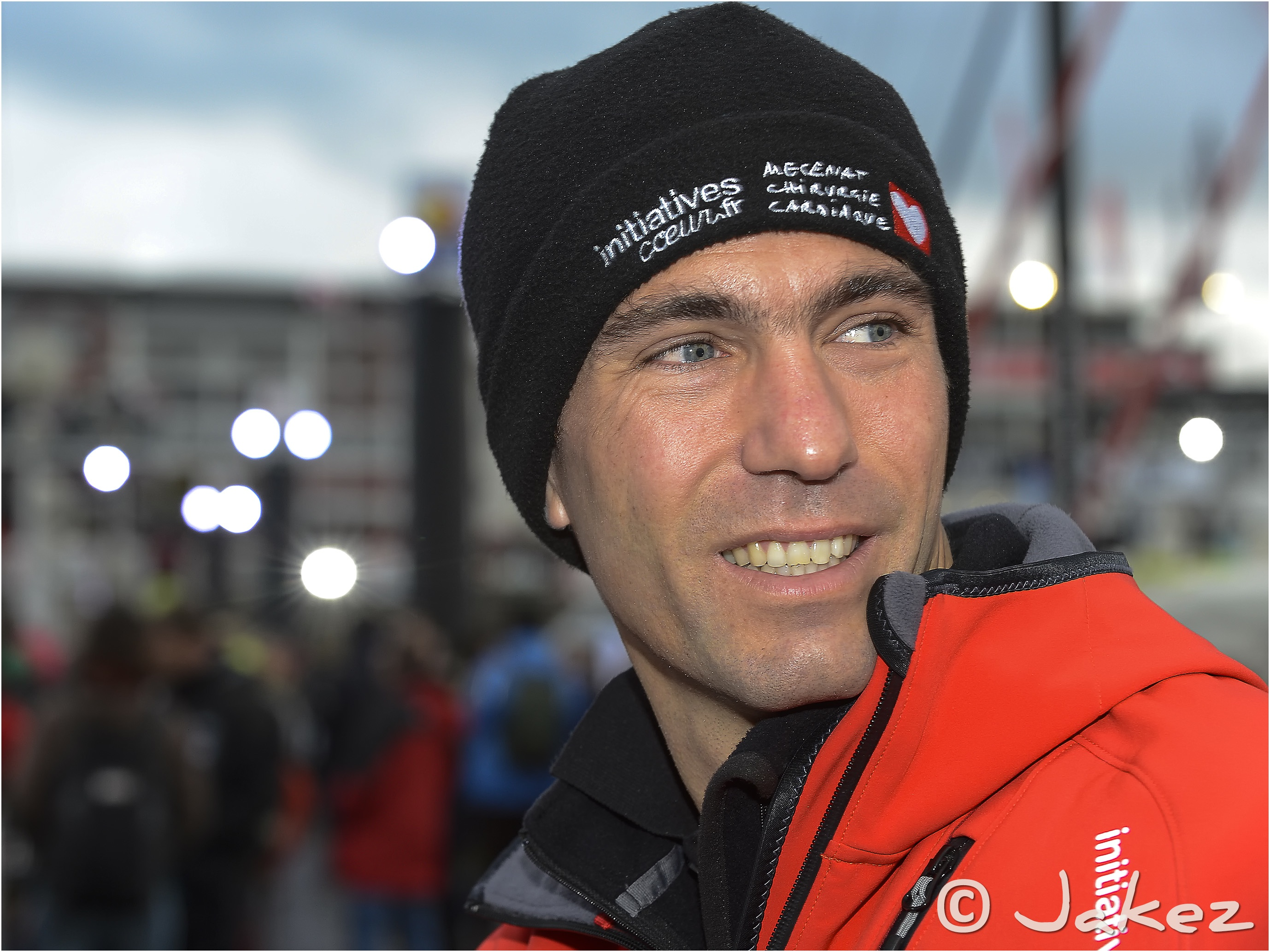

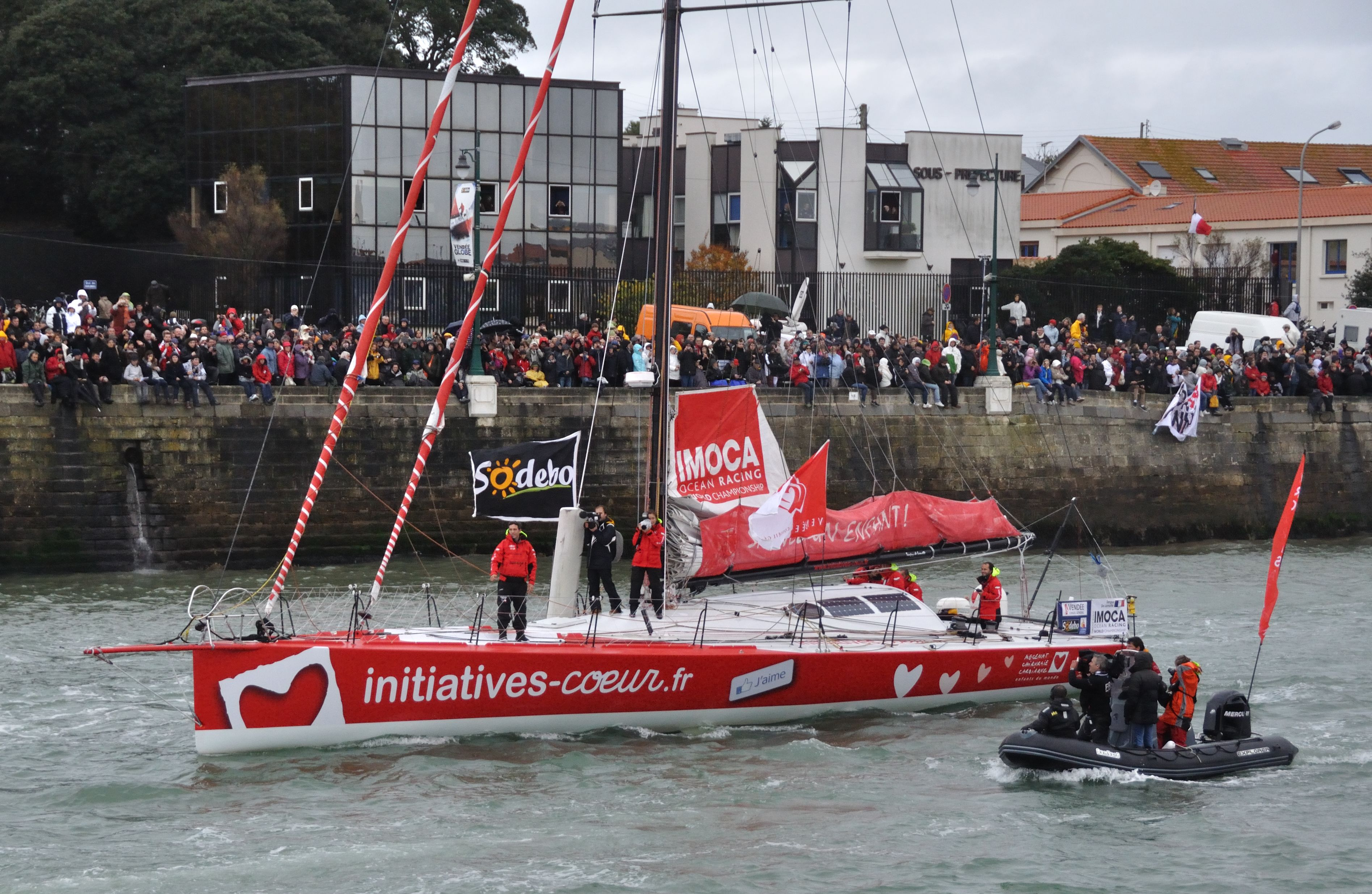

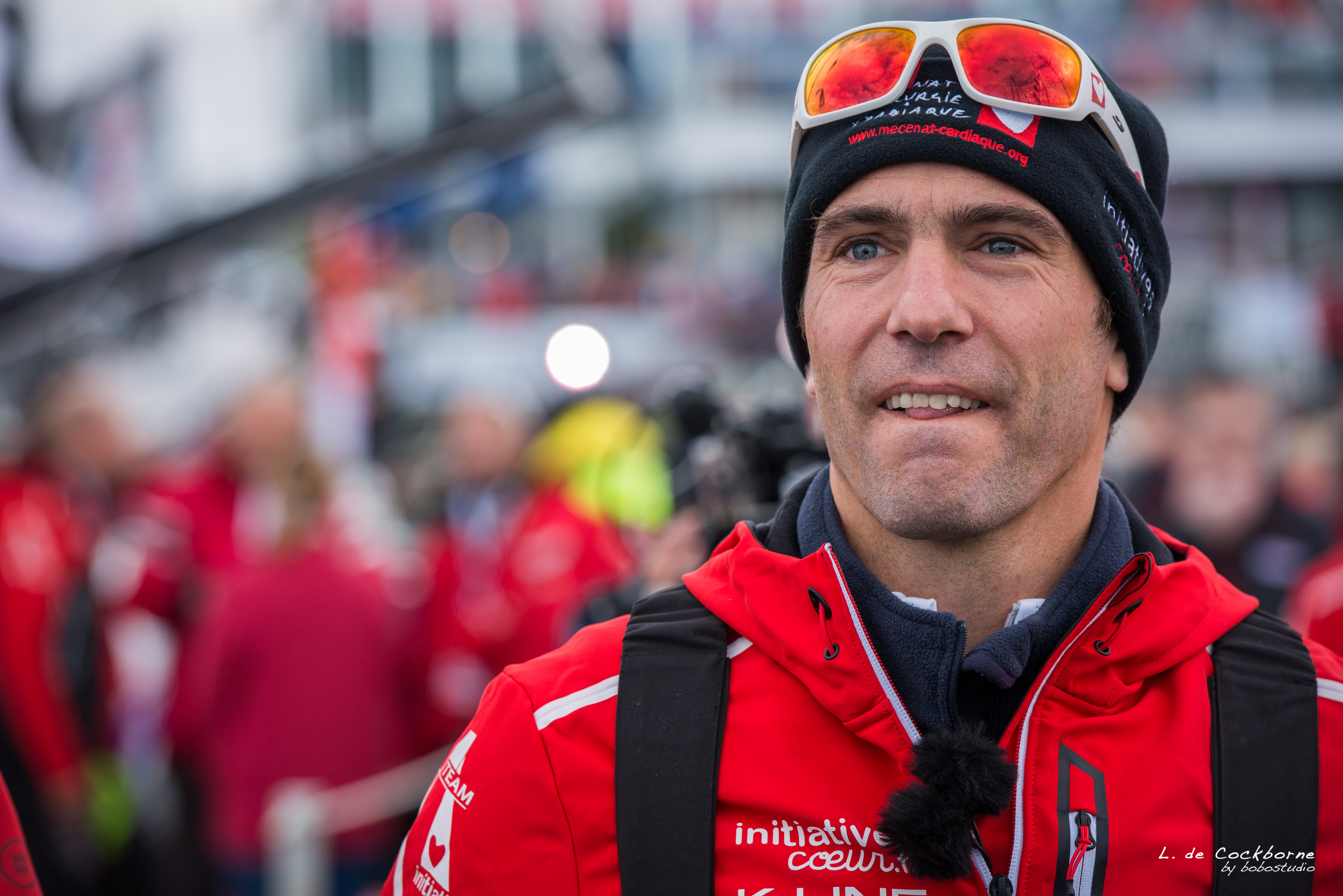

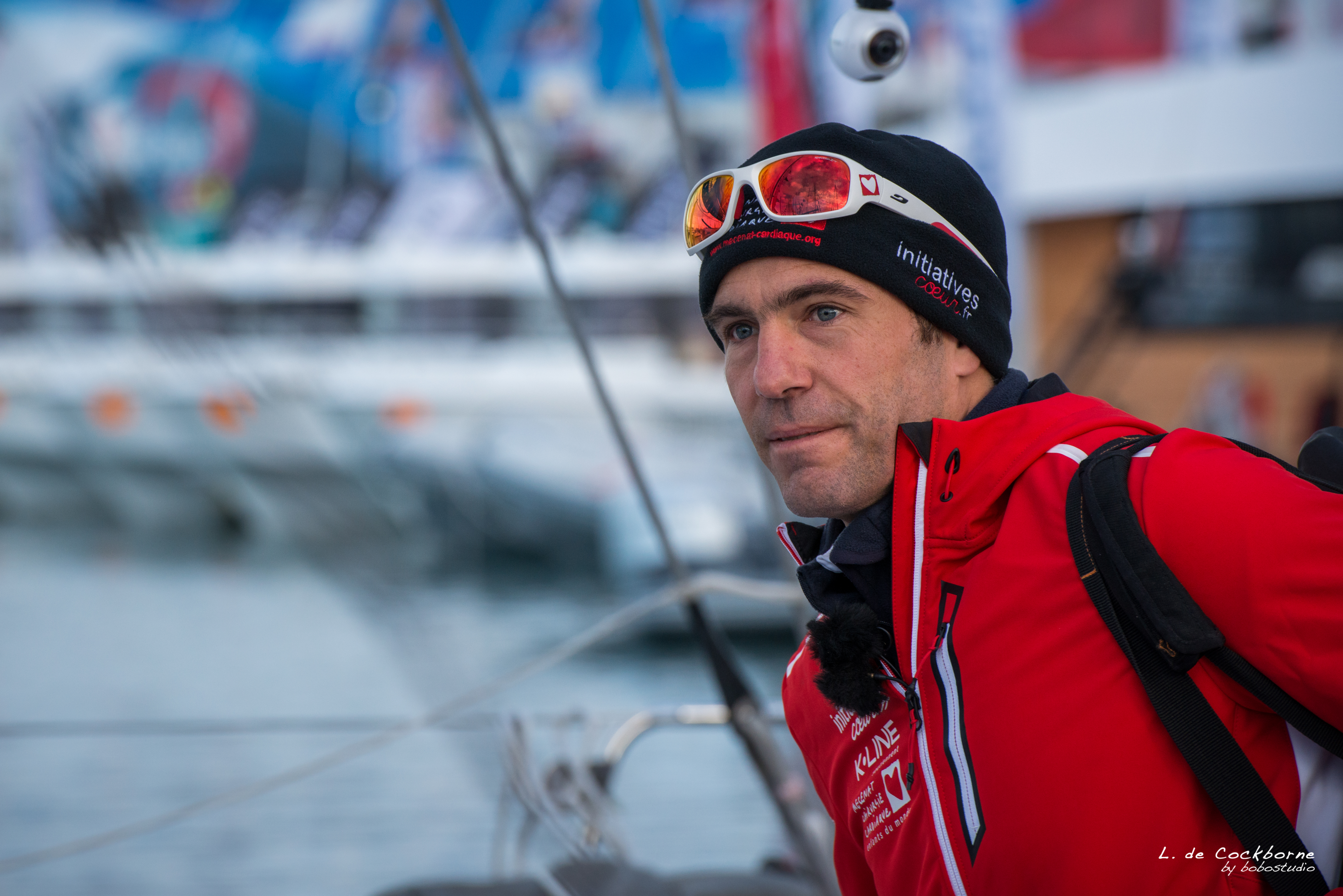
